= 2006 World Darts Trophy =

World Darts Trophy

Tournament information
- Dates: 2 September 2006 – 10 September 2006
- Venue: De Vechtsebanen
- Location: Utrecht, Utrecht
- Country: the Netherlands
- Organisation(s): BDO / WDF / PDC
- Format: Men; Sets; Final – Best of 13 Sets; Junior; Legs; Final – Best of 11 Legs

Champion(s)
- (England) Phil Taylor (men) (Netherlands) Ron Meulenkamp (junior)

The 2006 Bavaria World Darts Trophy was the fifth edition of the World Darts Trophy, a professional darts tournament held at the De Vechtsebanen in Utrecht, the Netherlands, run by the British Darts Organisation and the World Darts Federation.

Players from the Professional Darts Corporation competed for the first time, with five PDC players invited to the event. Gary Robson, the 2005 winner, and Jelle Klaasen, the BDO World Champion, were eliminated in the first round by Simon Whitlock and Tony Eccles, respectively. The final, featuring Phil Taylor, the PDC World Champion and in his first BDO major final for fourteen years, and Martin Adams, in his second straight World Darts Trophy final, was won by Taylor, 7–2 in sets. The women's event was replaced with a junior's event, with this being the only year a junior's event took place. Ron Meulenkamp won the junior's event.

== Prize money ==
=== Men ===
| Pos | Money (Euros) |
|---|---|
| Winner | 45,000 |
| Runner-up | 22,500 |
| Semi-Finals | 11,250 |
| Quarter-Finals | 6,000 |
| Last 16 | 3,000 |
| Last 32 | 2,000 |
| Highes; Checkout | 2,000 |

== Qualifiers ==
=== BDO / WDF / NDB ===
1. (Scotland) Gary Anderson
2. (England) Martin Adams
3. (England) Mervyn King
4. (England) Tony Eccles
5. (England) Martin Atkins
6. (Netherlands) Michael van Gerwen
7. (Netherlands) Niels de Ruiter
8. (England) John Walton
9. (England) Shaun Greatbatch
10. (Australia) Simon Whitlock
11. (Netherlands) Vincent van der Voort
12. (Scotland) Paul Hanvidge
13. (Denmark) Brian Sorensen
14. (England) Ted Hankey
15. (England) Paul Hogan
16. (Scotland) Mike Veitch
17. (England) Gary Robson
18. (Netherlands) Co Stompé
19. (England) Tony O'Shea
20. (Sweden) Göran Klemme
21. (Netherlands) Albertino Essers
22. (England) Tony Martin
23. (Netherlands) Jelle Klaasen
24. (England) Darryl Fitton
25. (Netherlands) Mareno Michels
26. (Netherlands) Dick van Dijk
27. (Belgium) Dirk Hespeels

=== Professional Darts Corporation ===
Five places were awarded to players from the PDC. Four places were awarded to the top four players in the PDC Order of Merit. A fifth place was awarded to Raymond van Barneveld, winner of the International Darts League.

PDC Order of Merit

1. (England) Colin Lloyd
2. (England) Phil Taylor
3. (England) Ronnie Baxter
4. (England) Peter Manley

IDL Winner

1. (Netherlands) Raymond van Barneveld

== Men's tournament ==
First round Best of 5 sets
(England) Colin Lloyd | 3
(England) Peter Manley | 1
(Scotland) Gary Anderson | 3
(England) Ted Hankey | 0
(England) Phil Taylor | 3
(Denmark) Brian Sorensen | 0
(England) John Walton | 3
(England) Shaun Greatbatch | 2
(England) Ronnie Baxter | 3
(England) Paul Hogan | 1
(England) Martin Atkins | 3
(Scotland) Paul Hanvidge | 0
(Scotland) Mike Veitch | 3
(Belgium) Dirk Hespeels | 0
(England) Tony Eccles | 3
(Netherlands) Jelle Klaasen | 0
(England) Martin Adams | 3
(Netherlands) Albertino Essers | 0
(England) Tony O'Shea | 3
(Netherlands) Dick van Dijk | 1
(Netherlands) Niels de Ruiter | 3
(Netherlands) Mareno Michels | 2
(Netherlands) Vincent van der Voort | 3
(Sweden) Göran Klemme | 2
(Netherlands) Michael van Gerwen | 3
(Netherlands) Raymond van Barneveld | 2
(Australia) Simon Whitlock | 3
(England) Gary Robson | 1
(England) Mervyn King | 3
(England) Tony Martin | 0
(England) Darryl Fitton | 3
(Netherlands) Co Stompé | 0

Second round Best of 7 sets
(England) Colin Lloyd | 4
(Scotland) Gary Anderson | 2
(England) Phil Taylor | 4
(England) John Walton | 1
(England) Ronnie Baxter | 4
(England) Martin Atkins | 0
(Scotland) Mike Veitch | 4
(England) Tony Eccles | 1
(England) Martin Adams | 4
(England) Tony O'Shea | 3
(Netherlands) Niels de Ruiter | 4
(Netherlands) Vincent van der Voort | 2
(Netherlands) Michael van Gerwen | 4
(Australia) Simon Whitlock | 3
(England) Mervyn King | 4
(England) Darryl Fitton | 1

Quarter-Finals; Best of 9 sets
(England) Colin Lloyd | 1
(England) Phil Taylor | 5
(England) Ronnie Baxter | 5
(Scotland) Mike Veitch | 3
(England) Martin Adams | 5
(Netherlands) Niels de Ruiter | 0
(Netherlands) Michael van Gerwen | 5
(England) Mervyn King | 4

Semi-Finals; Best of 11 sets
(England) Phil Taylor | 6
(England) Ronnie Baxter | 0
(England) Martin Adams | 6
(Netherlands) Michael van Gerwen | 4

Final; Best of 13 sets
(England) Phil Taylor (102.21) | 7
(England) Martin Adams (94.77) | 2

== Junior tournament ==
| Quarter-finals; Best of 7 legs | | Semi-finals; Best of 9 legs | | Final; Best of 11 legs |
| (Netherlands) Ron Meulenkamp | 4 |
| (Sweden) Oskar Lukasiak | 2 | (Netherlands) Ron Meulenkamp | 5 |
| (Netherlands) Jan Dekker | 4 | (Netherlands) Jan Dekker | 0 |
| (Belgium) Jeffrey Vanbergen | 2 | | | (Netherlands) Ron Meulenkamp | 6 |
| (Netherlands) Pieter Collijn | 3 | | | (Netherlands) Sven van Dun | 1 |
| (England) Richie George | 4 | (England) Richie George | 2 |
| (Denmark) Vladimir Andersen | 1 | (Netherlands) Sven van Dun | 5 |
| (Netherlands) Sven van Dun | 4 |

== Television coverage ==
The tournament was broadcast by SBS6 in the Netherlands, but was not shown in the UK. An internet feed from SBS was available. However, this may be restricted to the Netherlands only due to contractual restrictions.
