= Jelle Klaasen =

Dutch darts player (born 1984)

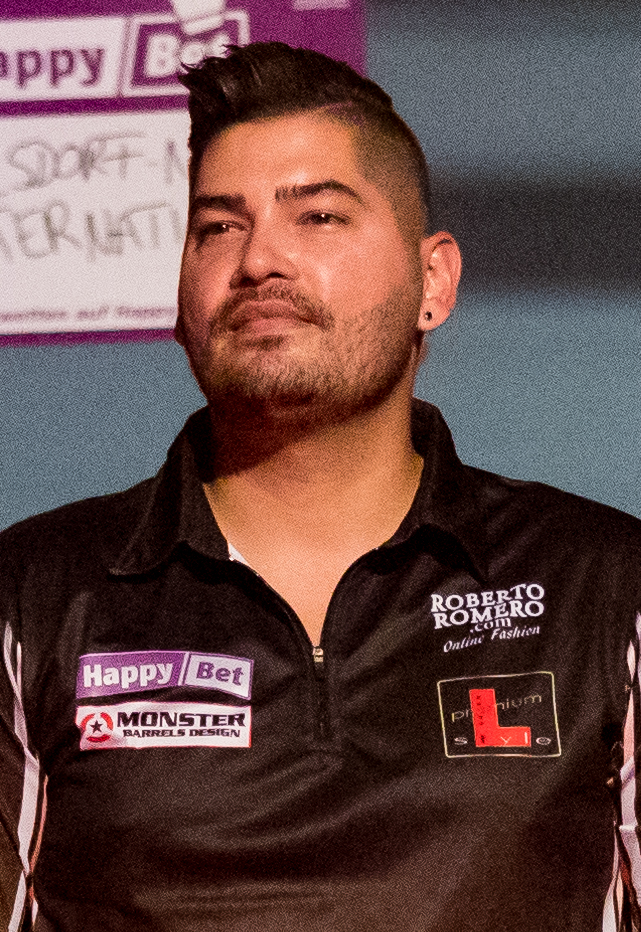
- Klaasen in 2017

Personal information
- Nickname: "The Cobra"
- Born: 17 October 1984 (age 42) Alphen, North Brabant, Netherlands
- Home town: Goor, Netherlands

Sport
- Sport: Darts
- Playing since: 2003
- Darts: 22g Unicorn Signature
- Laterality: Right-handed
- Walk-on music: "Sex on Fire" by Kings of Leon

Organisation (see split in darts)
- BDO: 2004–2007
- PDC: 2007–2021, 2024–present (Tour Card: 2011–2021; 2024–2025)
- WDF: 2004–2007, 2022–2023

WDF major events – best performances
- World Championship: Winner (1): 2006
- World Masters: Last 16: 2022
- World Trophy: Last 16: 2007
- Int. Darts League: Last 16, Group: 2006
- Finder Masters: Last 24, Group: 2005
- Australian Open: Quarter-final: 2022
- Dutch Open: Winner (1): 2022

PDC premier events – best performances
- World Championship: Semi-final: 2016
- World Matchplay: Quarter-final: 2010
- World Grand Prix: Quarter-final: 2015
- UK Open: Semi-final: 2016
- Grand Slam: Quarter-final: 2007
- European Championship: Semi-final: 2009
- Premier League: 7th: 2009
- Desert Classic: Last 16: 2008, 2009
- US Open/WSoD: Semi-final: 2010
- PC Finals: Last 16: 2010, 2013, 2014, 2016
- Masters: Last 16: 2016, 2017
- World Series Finals: Last 24: 2016, 2017

Other tournament wins
- Years
Bousema Open	2014
Budapest Masters	2023
FCD Anniversary Open	2023
Halstern Open	2010
Holiday Open Holland	2014
Irish Open	2022
Malta Masters	2023
Open Noord Nederland	2007
Open Rose	2014
Ranking Tuesday Open	2010
Texel Darts Trophy	2011
Westerlaan Open	2010
Players Championships (x3)
2007, 2015 (x2)

Other achievements
- 2006 Youngest BDO World Darts Champion.; 2009 Nine-dart finish at the Champions League of Darts.; 2022 World Darts Federation men's ranking leader.
Medal record
Men's Darts
Representing Netherlands
WDF World Cup
Gold medal – first place	2023 Esbjerg	Men's team
Gold medal – first place	2023 Esbjerg	Men's overall
WDF Europe Cup
Gold medal – first place	2006 Ennis	Men's team
Gold medal – first place	2006 Ennis	Men's overall
Silver medal – second place	2006 Ennis	Men's pairs
Silver medal – second place	2022 Gandía	Men's team
Silver medal – second place	2022 Gandía	Men's overall

Jelle Klaasen (born 17 October 1984) is a Dutch professional darts player who competes in Professional Darts Corporation (PDC) events. Nicknamed the Cobra, he previously participated in British Darts Organisation (BDO) tournaments, where he is a former BDO World Champion. He is the youngest BDO world champion in darts history, having won the 2006 World Championship, at 21 years old.

He switched from the BDO to the PDC in 2007, and has since won three Players Championship titles on the PDC Pro Tour. Klaasen has reached three PDC major semi-finals: at the 2009 European Championship, and both the PDC World Championship and UK Open in 2016. He has twice participated in Premier League Darts: in 2009 and 2017. After losing his PDC Tour Card at the end of 2021, he ended 2022 as the World Darts Federation (WDF) ranking leader. He won 5 ranking WDF titles from 2022 to 2023; including the 2022 Dutch Open and Irish Open. Klaasen regained his Tour Card in 2024, with his most notable achievement since being reaching the final at Players Championship 3 on the 2025 PDC Pro Tour.

== Beginnings of his career ==
His first attempt at the international stage was a 2005 Winmau World Masters ended with a 2–3 defeat to Irishman Steve McDonald.

On 15 January 2006, Klaasen became the youngest BDO World Darts Champion, aged 21 years 90 days, when he defeated fellow Dutchman Raymond van Barneveld in the final of the 2006 BDO World Championship by 7 sets to 5. He also beat Shaun Greatbatch and world number one Mervyn King on his way to the final. Before the tournament, he was a 100–1 outsider to win the title.

As World Champion, he was invited to the 2006 World Darts Trophy in his home country, but lost 0–3 to Tony Eccles in the first round. In 2007, he won in the first round 3–1 against reigning PDC World Champion Raymond van Barneveld, shortly after that he lost in the second round to Andy Hamilton. He also played in the 2006 International Darts League and beat 13-times World Champion Phil Taylor 7–6 in his last group match, but it was not enough to qualify for the knockout stages. He beat Andy Fordham and Dick van Dijk but lost to Martin Adams, Shaun Greatbatch and Colin Lloyd in his other group matches.

Klaasen has won some Open events in his native country including the Alkmaar Open. In March 2006 he was runner-up in the Finnish Open, losing in the final to Martin Atkins by 2–6. He also reached the quarter-finals of the Swiss Open and Denmark Open during 2006. In 2006 Winmau World Masters, he was seeded 13 but suffered a straight sets defeat in his first match against fellow Dutchman Mario Robbe.

Klaasen returned to the Lakeside to defend his World title at the 2007 Championship. Klaasen was unseeded for the event after a poor run of form and was facing the seeded Co Stompé, with eventual winner Martin Adams waiting in round two should he win. Klaasen became the sixth defending champion to fall at the first hurdle in his title defence with his first round loss to fellow countryman Stompé by three sets to nil. Although Klaasen was lower in the rankings at the time, it was considered an upset as Stompé had not won at the Lakeside in the previous four years.

The day after the final it was announced that Klaasen would be defecting to the rival Professional Darts Corporation, alongside two fellow countrymen, Michael van Gerwen and Vincent van der Voort. The BDO planned to take legal action as Jelle had a year left on his contract.

== PDC career ==
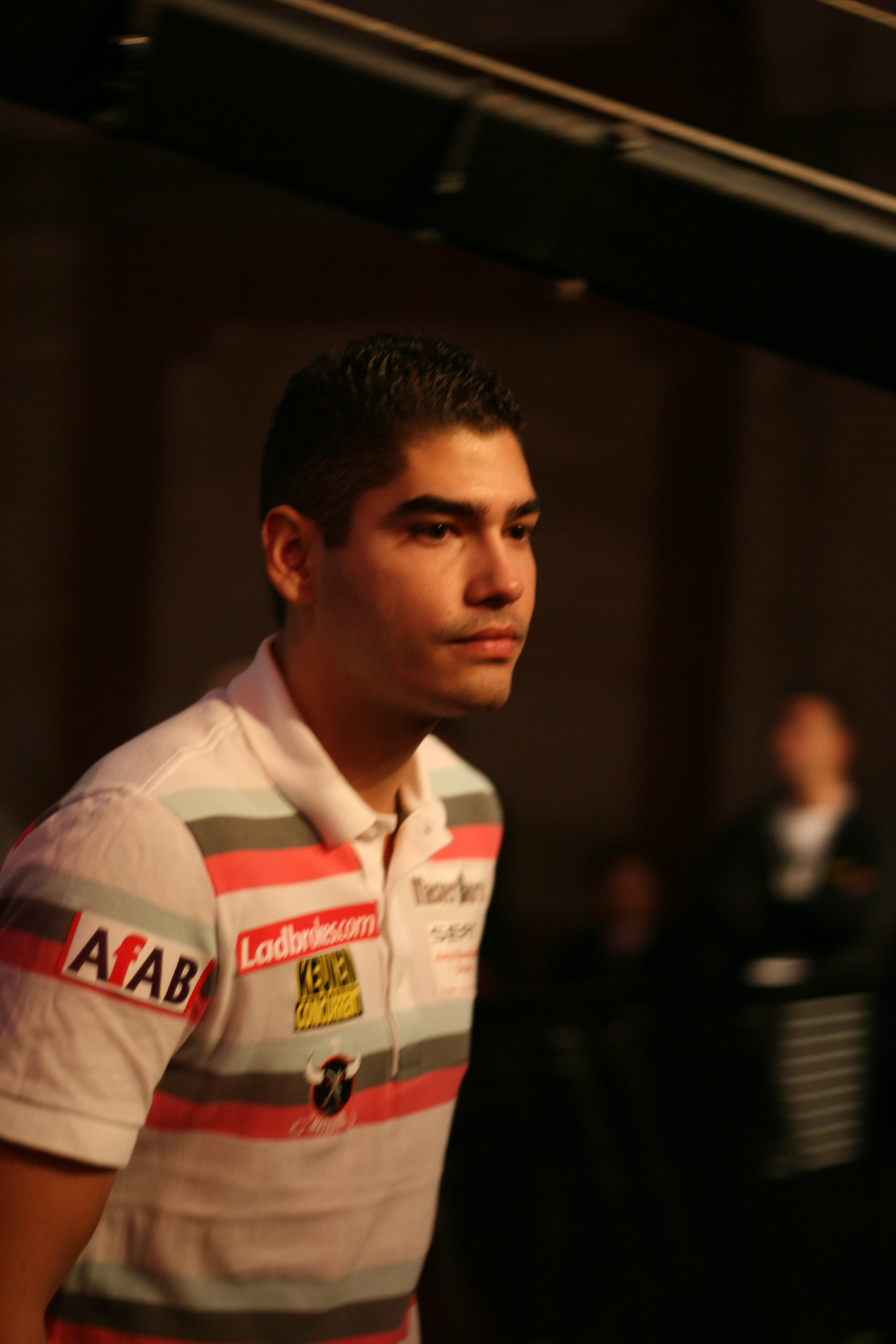
Klaasen in 2007

Klaasen did not make an immediate impact on the PDC circuit, having to start virtually from scratch at 262 in the world rankings. He competed at most of the Pro Tour events (Players Championships and UK Open Regional Finals) to improve his ranking. He reached the quarter-finals of two non-televised Pro Tour events before winning a Players Championship – the John McEvoy Gold Dart Classic in November which saw him climb to 49 in the PDC Order of Merit. He only made it into one televised PDC event in the UK during 2007 (the UK Open where he reached the last 32) but his form towards the end of the year ensured automatic qualification for the 2008 World Championship – his debut in the PDC version. He lost in the first round to fellow Dutchman Vincent van der Voort in a sudden death leg, having missed ten darts to win the match.

He defeated Colin Lloyd, Jan van der Rassel and Andy Hamilton to reach the quarter finals of the 2009 PDC World Championship, only dropping one set in the process. In the quarter finals, he was beaten by Van Barneveld 5–1. The match is best remembered for Barneveld hitting the first 9-dart leg in the history of the PDC World Championship.

In January 2009, Klaasen was chosen as one of the two wildcards for the 2009 Premier League Darts tournament, where he competed against Taylor, James Wade, Van Barneveld, John Part, Terry Jenkins, King and the other wildcard Wayne Mardle.

Klaasen found life hard in the Premier League, losing 5 and drawing 2 of his opening 7 matches. On 26 March, Klaasen defeated Terry Jenkins 8–6 to finally record his first victory in the competition. Klaasen finished 7th in the Premier League after Wayne Mardle withdrew from the competition. Klaasen qualified for the World Matchplay in Blackpool but lost 10–8 to Ronnie Baxter in the first round.

Klaasen lost in the first round of the 2010 World Championship losing 3–1 to Welshman Barrie Bates. He then reached the quarter finals of the 2010 World Matchplay, beating Mervyn King and Gary Anderson before losing to Simon Whitlock.

Klaasen reached the second round of the 2012 World Championship with a 3–1 win over Peter Wright, but was beaten 0–4 by James Wade in the second round. His best result of 2012 was in reaching the quarter-finals of the third UK Open Qualifier in March where he lost 4–6 to Mark Jones. At the UK Open itself he was defeated in the last 64 by Raymond van Barneveld 3–9. After revelations emerged with regard to Klaasen's personal life detailed below he did not play again in the rest of 2012, which included missing the 2013 World Championship.

=== 2013 ===
Klaasen returned to darts in January 2013 by qualifying for the first European Tour event of the year, the UK Darts Masters, with a 6–2 win over Carlos Rodríguez. He lost to Michael van Gerwen 5–6 in the first round. In May, Klaasen reached his first PDC final since November 2007 at the fourth Players Championship by beating the likes of Mervyn King and Gary Anderson. He averaged 103 in the final against Jamie Caven but lost 4–6 with his opponent averaging almost 111. At the UK Open he beat Gareth Pass, Ross Smith and Stuart Kellett to reach the last 16 for the first time since 2008. Klaasen played Ronnie Baxter and lost 7–9. He beat Wes Newton 6–4 and Justin Pipe 10–6 to advance to the quarter-finals of the European Championship, where he was defeated 7–10 by Michael van Gerwen. In the first round of the World Matchplay he came back from 3–8 down against Simon Whitlock to trail only 7–9, but lost the next leg to fall short of a successful fightback. Klaasen was outplayed by Gary Anderson in the first round of the World Grand Prix as the Scotsman did not give Klaasen one dart at a leg winning double in a 2–0 in sets ten minute match. In the double-start event Anderson averaged 104.86, almost 40 points ahead of Klaasen's 67.22. Klaasen knocked out number two seed Dave Chisnall 6–4 in the Players Championship Finals, before losing 9–5 to Anderson in the second round.

=== 2014 ===
Klaasen played Jamie Caven in the first round of the 2014 World Championship and lost 3–1 as he hit just 17% of his darts at doubles. At the German Darts Championship he reached the semi-finals of a European Tour event for the first time by defeating Michael van Gerwen 6–5 in the quarters. He played Justin Pipe and was denied a place in the final as Pipe took out a 134 finish in the deciding leg. Klaasen was narrowly beaten 9–8 by Andy Hamilton in the third round of the UK Open. At the European Championship, Klaasen knocked out reigning champion Adrian Lewis 6–4 in the first round and Caven 10–7 to reach the quarter-finals for the second year in a row, where he lost 10–5 to Mervyn King. Klaasen averaged 108.74 in beating James Wade 6–4 in the first round of the Players Championship Finals, but then averaged nearly 20 points lower as he missed 22 doubles in the next round against Dean Winstanley to be beaten 10–5.

=== 2015 ===
Klaasen met Gary Anderson in the second round of the 2015 World Championship after seeing off compatriot Christian Kist 3–1. Klaasen went 3–1 up and was two legs to one ahead in the next set, before Anderson took out 84 on the bull with Klaasen waiting on 89 for the match. Anderson sealed the set in the next leg and won the final two sets by three legs to one scorelines to win 4–3. Both players averaged over 100 with 20 180s thrown during the match. Klaasen defeated Phil Taylor 6–2 at the fourth UK Open Qualifier to play in his first final in almost two years. However, he missed 10 match darts to slip from 5–2 ahead of Michael van Gerwen to lose 6–5. At the UK Open, Klaasen beat Brendan Dolan 9–4, before losing 9–5 to Andrew Gilding in the fourth round. Klaasen recorded successive wins over Adrian Lewis, Mervyn King and Simon Whitlock to reach the final of the 12th Players Championship where, after taking the opening leg, he was beaten 6–1 by Peter Wright. Klaasen reached his third final of the year at the 14th Players Championship and won his first title in nearly eight years by beating Ian White 6–2. He was knocked out 10–4 by Whitlock in the first round of the World Matchplay. In September, Klaasen's second title of the year came at the 16th Players Championship with a 6–4 victory over Raymond van Barneveld.

Klaasen reached his first quarter-final at the World Grand Prix by eliminating Brendan Dolan 2–1 and Dave Chisnall 3–2 and faced Mark Webster. The match went all the way to a deciding leg in the fifth set in which Klaasen crucially missed five opening doubles and could never catch up to lose 3–2. Wins over Raymond van Barneveld and James Wade saw Klaasen reach another major quarter-final at the European Championship, but he was defeated 10–6 by Gary Anderson.

=== 2016 ===
Klaasen overcame Joe Cullen and Mervyn King to advance to the third round of the World Championship for the first time since 2009. He missed one dart at double 18 to complete a 147 finish and defeat Phil Taylor 4–2, before going 2–0 down in legs in the final set. Taylor missed one dart to win the match and Klaasen took full advantage by winning four legs on the trot, wrapping it up with an 11 darter. In the quarter-finals, Klaasen was 3–1 and 4–3 behind Alan Norris in a race to five. He was two legs to one down in the next set but produced back-to-back 11 dart legs to win it and then clinched the final set without conceding a leg to advance to the semi-finals of a PDC World Championship for the first time, where he faced reigning champion Gary Anderson. Klaasen's victory also marked the first time that a player has won their next game after knocking Taylor out of a PDC World Championship. In the semis he was thrashed 6–0 by Anderson, who averaged 107. Klaasen also reached the semi-finals of the next major event as he whitewashed Kyle Anderson 10–0 at the UK Open, but he lost 10–5 to Peter Wright. He was defeated 10–6 by Steve Beaton in the opening round of the World Matchplay and at the same stage of the World Grand Prix, 2–1 in sets by Adrian Lewis.

Klaasen knocked out Dave Chisnall 6–4 to reach the final of the German Darts Championship, but lost 6–5 to Norris after leading 4–2. 6–3 and 10–4 wins over Steve West and Stephen Bunting saw Klaasen face Michael van Gerwen in the quarter-finals of the European Championship and he was comfortably beaten 10–3. He missed three match darts in the third round of the Players Championship Finals as Chisnall edged through 10–9.

=== 2017 ===
He got to the third round of the World Championship for the second year in a row with comfortable victories over Jeffrey de Graaf and Brendan Dolan, but found himself 3–1 down to Dave Chisnall. Klaasen took the next set and led by two legs to none in the sixth, before Chisnall won three legs on the spin to triumph 4–2. His return to the Premier League was blighted by tendinitis in his wrist for which Klaasen received anti-inflammatory injections before matches. Klaasen explained how he could play for five or six legs before experiencing pain in his throwing hand. His only win out of his nine league games came against Chisnall and Klaasen finished ninth in the table to be eliminated. He lost 6–2 in the final of the German Darts Masters to Van Gerwen.

=== 2018 ===
At the 2018 PDC World Darts Championship, Klaasen was defeated by Jan Dekker 3–1 in the first round. He was defeated 10–5 by Peter Wright in the opening round of the World Matchplay.

=== 2019 ===
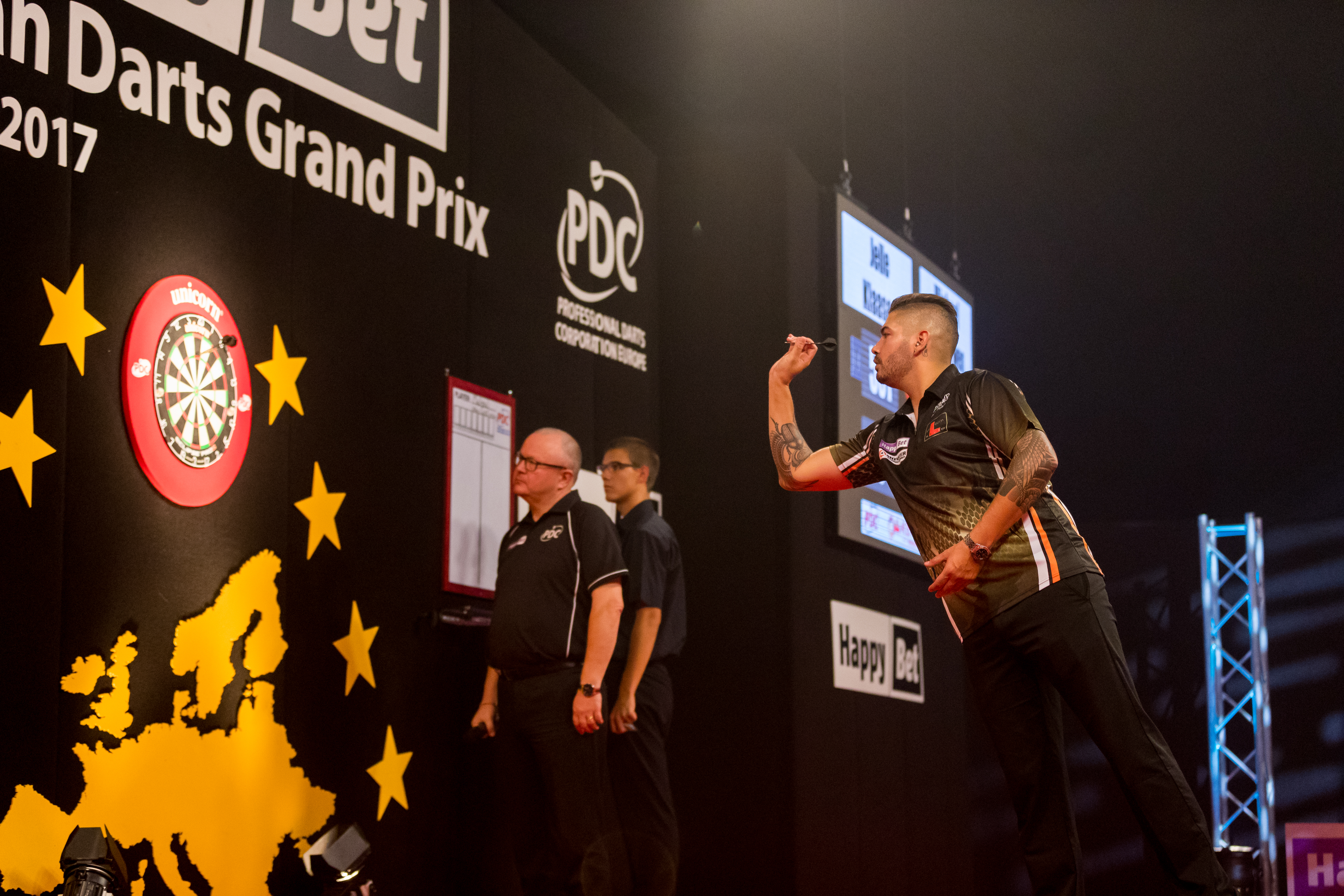
Klaasen during the 2019 German Darts Grand Prix

At the 2019 PDC World Darts Championship, Jelle was defeated by Keegan Brown 3–1 in the second round. He lost in the fourth round of the UK Open to Madars Razma 10–4. He then qualified for his first euro tour of the year 2019 International Darts Open, losing in the first round to Joe Murnan 6–5. He then lost in the Players Championship Finals to Max Hopp 6–3.

=== 2020 ===
Klaasen beat Kevin Burness 3–1 in the first round of the 2020 PDC World Darts Championship, before losing to Michael van Gerwen by the same scoreline. At the 2020 UK Open, he started his campaign by defeating Riley's qualifier Jason Askew 6–4. Klaasen then beat William Borland 10–5 before thrashing Steve West 10–1 to set up a sixth-round clash with Gary Anderson. He overcame Anderson 10–9 before losing in the quarter-finals to Daryl Gurney.

=== 2021: Loss of Tour card ===
Klaasen lost his PDC Tour Card at the end of the 2021 season after struggling to maintain consistency in his performances after being a fixture on the professional darts circuit for 14 years. Following this, Klaasen participated in various non-Tour Card events, including the PDC Challenge Tour and WDF competitions.

=== 2022–2023: WDF Career ===
From the beginning of 2022, Klaasen took part in tournaments organized by the World Darts Federation. In June 2022, he took part in the Dutch Open, where he was seeded in 26th. On his way to the final of this tournament, he defeated leading WDF players including Richard Veenstra and Thibault Tricole, before defeating Mark Barilli in the final. This qualified him for the 2023 WDF World Darts Championship and 2022 World Masters. In November, he won the Irish Open. On his way to the final, he defeated Michael Warburton, Kai Fan Leung and Ryan Hogarth. In the final, he faced Dylan Slevin and defeated him by 6–3 in legs. He ended the 2022 season as the leader of the World Darts Federation men's ranking.

=== 2024–2025: Return to PDC ===
Klaasen successfully regained his PDC Tour Card during the European Q-School in 2024 after a two-year absence from the professional circuit. His path included a series of tightly contested matches in the final stage of Q-School, culminating in a victory over Benjamin Drue Reus in the decisive match. In interviews, Klaasen reflected positively on his WDF experience but emphasized his readiness to compete at the highest level again.

Klassen reached his first PDC Pro Tour final since his return at 2025 Players Championship 3, being defeated by Chris Dobey 8–4.

== Personal life ==
Klaasen lives in Goor, Netherlands. He has Indonesian origins.

Before the 2006 World Championships, Klaasen worked for a manpower agency in the Netherlands but he has now taken up darts full-time. He is sponsored by Keukenconcurrent, a company that produces fitted kitchens in his home country.

=== 2012 sex offence ===
In August 2012, Klaasen was accused of sending naked photo messages of himself to a then 15-year-old family friend of his fellow darts player and former friend since childhood, Michael van Gerwen, which he admitted to in the Dutch press. According to her mother, the underaged girl was diagnosed with PDD-NOS, an autism spectrum disorder, though the case didn't go to court and during the prosecution service process this was never proven.

Later that year, on 13 December, he was sentenced to 16 hours of community service and a fine of €327, to be paid to the girl.

== World Championship results ==
=== BDO World Championship ===
- 2006: Winner (beat Raymond van Barneveld 7–5)
- 2007: First round (lost to Co Stompé 0–3)

=== PDC World Championship ===
- 2008: First round (lost to Vincent van der Voort 2–3)
- 2009: Quarter-finals (lost to Raymond van Barneveld 1–5)
- 2010: First round (lost to Barrie Bates 1–3)
- 2011: First round (lost to Steve Brown 1–3)
- 2012: Second round (lost to James Wade 0–4)
- 2014: First round (lost to Jamie Caven 1–3)
- 2015: Second round (lost to Gary Anderson 3–4)
- 2016: Semi-finals (lost to Gary Anderson 0–6)
- 2017: Third round (lost to Dave Chisnall 2–4)
- 2018: First round (lost to Jan Dekker 1–3)
- 2019: Second round (lost to Keegan Brown 1–3)
- 2020: Second round (lost to Michael van Gerwen 1–3)

=== WDF World Championship ===
- 2023: Semi-finals (lost to Chris Landman 3–5)

== Career finals ==
=== BDO major finals: 1 (1 title) ===
Outcome	No.	Year	Championship	Opponent in the final	Score (Note: (l) = score in legs, (s) = score in sets.)
Winner	1.	2006	World Championship	(Netherlands) Raymond van Barneveld	7–5 (s)

== Performance timeline ==
=== BDO ===
Tournament	2005	2006	2007
BDO Ranked televised events
World Championship	DNQ	W	1R
International Darts League	DNQ	2R	RR
World Darts Trophy	DNQ	1R	2R
World Masters	RR	2R	PDC
Zuiderduin Masters	RR	NH	PDC
Masters of Darts	DNP	NH	RR

WDF

Tournament	2022	2023
WDF Ranked major/platinum events
World Championship	DNP	SF
WDF World Masters	4R	NH
Australian Open	QF	DNP
Dutch Open	W	SF

=== PDC ===
Tournament	2007	2008	2009	2010	2011	2012	2013	2014	2015	2016	2017	2018	2019	2020	2021	2022	2023	2024	2025
PDC Ranked televised events
World Championship	BDO	1R	QF	1R	1R	2R	DNQ	1R	2R	SF	3R	1R	2R	2R	Did not qualify				
World Masters (Note: A non-ranked event until 2025.)	Not held						DNQ			1R	1R	Did not qualify							Prel.
UK Open	4R	5R	4R	4R	1R	3R	5R	3R	4R	SF	4R	3R	4R	QF	3R	4R	4R	1R	2R
World Matchplay	BDO	DNQ	1R	QF	DNQ		1R	DNQ	1R	1R	1R	1R	Did not qualify						
World Grand Prix	BDO	DNQ					1R	DNQ	QF	1R	1R	Did not qualify							
European Championship	NH	2R	SF	2R	1R	DNQ	QF	QF	QF	QF	2R	1R	Did not qualify						
Grand Slam (Note: A non-ranked event until 2015.)	QF	Did not qualify							RR	Did not qualify									
Players Championship Finals	Not held		DNQ	2R	1R	DNQ	2R	2R	1R	3R	2R	1R	1R	DNQ	1R	Did not qualify			
PDC Non-ranked televised events
Premier League	DNP		7th	Did not participate							9th	Did not participate							
World Series Finals	Not held								DNQ	1R	1R	Did not qualify							
Past major events
Las Vegas Desert Classic	DNQ	2R	2R	Not held															
Championship League	NH	DNQ	RR	RR	RR	DNQ		Not held											
Career statistics
Season-end ranking	–		24	26	35	42	34	30	19	10	12	24	49	56	78	143	144	135	101

==== European Tour ====
Season	1	2	3	4	5	6	7	8	9	10	11	12	13
2012	ADO; 1R	GDC; DNQ	EDO; 2R	GDM; 1R	DDM; DNP								
2013	UKM; 1R	EDT; DNQ	EDO; 1R	ADO; QF	GDT; 1R	GDC; 3R	GDM; 1R	DDM; 1R					
2014	GDC; SF	DDM; 1R	GDM; 1R	DNQ		EDO; 1R	EDG; 1R	EDT; 3R					
2015	GDC; 2R	GDT; QF	GDM; DNQ	DDM; 2R	IDO; DNQ	EDO; QF	EDT; DNQ	EDM; 2R	EDG; QF				
2016	DDM; 3R	GDM; 3R	GDT; 2R	EDM; QF	ADO; 3R	EDO; QF	IDO; 3R	EDT; QF	EDG; 2R	GDC; F			
2017	GDC; SF	GDM; F	GDO; SF	EDG; SF	GDT; 2R	EDM; 2R	ADO; 3R	EDO; 2R	DDM; 2R	GDG; QF	IDO; QF	EDT; 3R	
2018	EDO; 2R	GDG; 2R	GDO; 3R	ADO; 2R	EDG; 2R	DDM; 2R	GDT; DNQ	DDO; 2R	EDM; 3R	GDC; DNQ	DDC; 1R	IDO; 2R	EDT; QF
2022	Did not qualify						EDG; 2R	DDC; 2R	Did not qualify			BDO; 2R	GDT; DNQ
2023	Did not qualify				ADO; 2R	DNQ		CDO; 1R	Did not qualify				GDC; 1R
2024	Did not qualify								GDC; 1R	Did not qualify			

==== Players Championships ====
Season	1	2	3	4	5	6	7	8	9	10	11	12	13	14	15	16	17	18	19	20	21	22	23	24	25	26	27	28	29	30	31	32	33	34
2015	BAR; 4R	BAR; 4R	BAR; 1R	BAR; 4R	BAR; 4R	COV; 1R	COV; 3R	COV; 3R	CRA; 3R	CRA; 3R	BAR; QF	BAR; F	WIG; 3R	WIG; W	BAR; QF	BAR; W	DUB; 3R	DUB; 3R	COV; 2R	COV; SF														
2016	BAR; 2R	BAR; 4R	BAR; 1R	BAR; QF	BAR; 2R	BAR; 4R	BAR; 1R	COV; 2R	COV; 3R	BAR; 3R	BAR; 1R	BAR; 2R	BAR; 3R	BAR; 3R	BAR; QF	BAR; 3R	DUB; 2R	DUB; QF	BAR; 3R	BAR; 1R														
2017	BAR; 2R	BAR; SF	BAR; 2R	BAR; 4R	MIL; 1R	MIL; 2R	BAR; 1R	BAR; 1R	WIG; 2R	WIG; 3R	MIL; DNP		WIG; 2R	WIG; 1R	BAR; 1R	BAR; 1R	BAR; 2R	BAR; 4R	DUB; 2R	DUB; 1R	BAR; 2R	BAR; 1R												
2018	BAR; 1R	BAR; 2R	BAR; 4R	BAR; 2R	MIL; 3R	MIL; 4R	BAR; 1R	BAR; 1R	WIG; 2R	WIG; 2R	MIL; 2R	MIL; 2R	WIG; 2R	WIG; 2R	BAR; 1R	BAR; 2R	BAR; 2R	BAR; 4R	DUB; 1R	DUB; 2R	BAR; 1R	BAR; 2R												
2019	WIG; 3R	WIG; 2R	WIG; 1R	WIG; 1R	BAR; 1R	BAR; 1R	WIG; 3R	WIG; 1R	BAR; 2R	BAR; 2R	BAR; QF	BAR; 3R	BAR; 3R	BAR; 4R	BAR; 1R	BAR; 1R	WIG; 4R	WIG; 2R	BAR; 2R	BAR; 4R	HIL; 1R	HIL; 2R	BAR; 2R	BAR; 3R	BAR; 4R	BAR; 2R	DUB; 1R	DUB; 1R	BAR; 1R	BAR; 3R				
2020	BAR; 1R	BAR; 1R	WIG; 1R	WIG; 2R	WIG; 1R	WIG; 2R	BAR; 2R	BAR; 1R	MIL; 1R	MIL; 2R	MIL; 1R	MIL; 1R	MIL; 2R	NIE; QF	NIE; 1R	NIE; 2R	NIE; 2R	NIE; 2R	COV; 2R	COV; 1R	COV; 2R	COV; 1R	COV; 2R											
2021	BOL; 4R	BOL; 2R	BOL; 1R	BOL; 1R	MIL; 1R	MIL; 1R	MIL; 1R	MIL; 4R	NIE; 1R	NIE; 2R	NIE; 2R	NIE; 1R	MIL; 2R	MIL; 2R	MIL; 1R	MIL; 1R	COV; 1R	COV; 2R	COV; 2R	COV; 1R	BAR; 1R	BAR; 1R	BAR; 3R	BAR; 2R	BAR; 3R	BAR; 1R	BAR; 1R	BAR; 1R	BAR; QF	BAR; 1R				
2022	Did not participate															NIE; 1R	NIE; 1R	Did not participate											BAR; 1R	BAR; 1R				
2023	Did not participate							HIL; 2R	Did not participate				HIL; 1R	HIL; 1R	LEI; DNP		HIL; 1R	HIL; 2R	Did not participate										BAR; 1R	BAR; 1R				
2024	WIG; 1R	WIG; 1R	LEI; 1R	LEI; 1R	HIL; 2R	HIL; 2R	LEI; 3R	LEI; 3R	HIL; 1R	HIL; 2R	HIL; 1R	HIL; 2R	MIL; 1R	MIL; 1R	MIL; 1R	MIL; 1R	MIL; 1R	MIL; 1R	MIL; 1R	WIG; 1R	WIG; 2R	LEI; 1R	LEI; 1R	WIG; 1R	WIG; 1R	WIG; 1R	WIG; 1R	WIG; 3R	LEI; 2R	LEI; 1R				
2025	WIG; 1R	WIG; 1R	ROS; F	ROS; 1R	LEI; 1R	LEI; 1R	HIL; 1R	HIL; 3R	LEI; 2R	LEI; 1R	LEI; 1R	LEI; 2R	ROS; 2R	ROS; 1R	HIL; 2R	HIL; 1R	LEI; 1R	LEI; 1R	LEI; 2R	LEI; 1R	LEI; 1R	HIL; 1R	HIL; 2R	MIL; 1R	MIL; 1R	HIL; 1R	HIL; 1R	LEI; 1R	LEI; 2R	LEI; 1R	WIG; 2R	WIG; 2R	WIG; 1R	WIG; 3R

Key

Performance Table Legend
W	Won the tournament	F	Finalist	SF	Semifinalist	QF	Quarterfinalist	#R; RR; Prel.	Lost in # round Round-robin; Preliminary round	DQ	Disqualified
DNQ	Did not qualify	DNP	Did not participate	WD	Withdrew	NH	Tournament not held	#R; RR; Prel.	Lost in # round Round-robin; Preliminary round	NYF	Not yet founded

== See also ==
- List of darts players who have switched organisation
