= Albertino Essers =

Dutch darts player (born 1969)

Personal information
- Nickname: "The Sensation"
- Born: 30 May 1969 (age 57) Oosterbeek, Netherlands

Sport
- Sport: Darts
- Playing since: 1991
- Darts: 23g Grand Slam
- Laterality: Right-handed
- Walk-on music: "Explode" by Jordan & Baker

Organisation (see split in darts)
- BDO: 2001–2007, 2012–2013

WDF major events – best performances
- World Championship: Last 16: 2006, 2007
- World Masters: Last 32: 2002, 2004
- World Trophy: Last 32: 2003, 2004, 2006
- Int. Darts League: Last 32 Group: 2003, 2004, 2006
- Finder Masters: Last 24 Group: 2003, 2004, 2005

Other tournament wins
- Tournament: Years
- Belgium Open: 2005
- Updated on 23 May 2019

Albertino Essers (born 30 May 1969) is a Dutch former professional darts player who competed in British Darts Organisation (BDO) events. Nicknamed the Sensation, he won the 2005 Belgium Open.

== Career ==
In the 2007 BDO World Darts Championship, Essers defeated the number 2 seed, Scotland's Gary Anderson, in the first round, but lost to Scotsman Paul Hanvidge in the second round. Paul Hogan beat Essers in the second round in 2006, after Essers had defeated Ted Hankey 3–1 in the first round. At one point Essers suffered from dartitis, an inability to release the dart while throwing.

== World Championship performances ==
=== BDO ===
- 2003: 1st Round (lost to Richie Davies 1–3)
- 2004: 1st Round (lost to Steve Duke 1–3)
- 2006: 2nd Round (lost to Paul Hogan 2–4)
- 2007: 2nd Round (lost to Paul Hanvidge 1–4)

== Performance timeline ==
| Tournament | 2002 | 2003 | 2004 | 2005 | 2006 | 2007 |
|---|---|---|---|---|---|---|
| BDO World Championship | DNQ | 1R | 1R | DNQ | 2R | 2R |
| International Darts League | NH | RR | RR | DNQ | RR | PR |
| World Darts Trophy | DNQ | 1R | 1R | DNQ | 1R | DNQ |
| Winmau World Masters | L32 | L64 | L32 | L64 | L64 | DNQ |
| Finder Darts Masters | DNQ | RR | RR | RR | DNQ | |

Performance Table Legend
| W | Won the tournament | F | Finalist | SF | Semifinalist | QF | Quarterfinalist | #R; RR; L# | Lost in # round Round-robin; Last # stage | DQ | Disqualified |
| DNQ | Did not qualify | DNP | Did not participate | WD | Withdrew | NH | Tournament not held | #R; RR; L# | Lost in # round Round-robin; Last # stage | NYF | Not yet founded |
