= 2006 International Darts League =

The 2006 Topic International Darts League was a darts tournament held at the Triavium in Nijmegen, Netherlands, from 6 to 14 May 2006. The tournament was sponsored by Topic, a Dutch-based electronics, software and hardware manufacturer.

It began as a tournament for BDO players, but Dutch broadcaster SBS-6 invited five PDC/non-WDF players to this event for the first time, with Raymond van Barneveld's switch to the PDC earlier in the year being a vital part of that decision.

== Results ==
The draw was conducted on 10 March 2006.

=== First round ===
"ROUND ROBIN" BEST OF 11 LEGS. BEST TWO IN EACH GROUP GO FORWARD TO "ROUND ROBIN" ROUND TWO

- Group A

Mervyn King 6–1 Gary Robson
Vincent van der Voort 2–6 Raymond van Barneveld
Mervyn King 3–6 Vincent van der Voort
Gary Robson 6–4 Raymond van Barneveld
Mervyn King 3–6 Raymond van Barneveld
Gary Robson 6–3 Vincent van der Voort

| Pos | Name | **Wins** | Legs won | Legs lost |
|---|---|---|---|---|
| **1** | (Netherlands) Raymond van Barneveld | **2** | 16 | 11 |
| **2** | (England) Gary Robson | **2** | 13 | 13 |
| **3** | (England) Mervyn King | **1** | 12 | 13 |
| **4** | (Netherlands) Vincent van der Voort | **1** | 11 | 15 |

- Group B

Simon Whitlock 4–6 Albertino Essers
Roland Scholten 6–1 Jonny Nijs
Simon Whitlock 6–2 Roland Scholten
Albertino Essers 1–6 Roland Scholten
Simon Whitlock 6–4 Jonny Nijs
Albertino Essers 6–3 Jonny Nijs

| Pos | Name | **Wins** | Legs won | Legs lost |
|---|---|---|---|---|
| **1** | (Netherlands) Roland Scholten | **2** | 14 | 8 |
| **2** | (Australia) Simon Whitlock | **2** | 16 | 12 |
| **3** | (Netherlands) Albertino Essers | **2** | 13 | 13 |
| **4** | (Netherlands) Jonny Nijs | **0** | 8 | 18 |

- Group C

Paul Hanvidge 5–6 Phil Taylor
Co Stompé 4–6 Darryl Fitton
Paul Hanvidge 6–4 Co Stompé
Phil Taylor 6–5 Darryl Fitton
Paul Hanvidge 2–6 Darryl Fitton
Phil Taylor 6–0 Co Stompé

| Pos | Name | **Wins** | Legs won | Legs lost |
|---|---|---|---|---|
| **1** | (England) Phil Taylor | **3** | 18 | 10 |
| **2** | (England) Darryl Fitton | **2** | 17 | 12 |
| **3** | (Scotland) Paul Hanvidge | **1** | 13 | 16 |
| **4** | (Netherlands) Co Stompé | **0** | 8 | 18 |

- Group D

Tony Eccles 6–3 Michael van Gerwen
Colin Lloyd 6–2 Martin Atkins
Tony Eccles 1–6 Colin Lloyd
Michael van Gerwen 6–2 Martin Atkins
Tony Eccles 6–1 Martin Atkins
Michael van Gerwen 6–3 Colin Lloyd

| Pos | Name | **Wins** | Legs won | Legs lost |
|---|---|---|---|---|
| **1** | (England) Colin Lloyd | **2** | 15 | 9 |
| **2** | (Netherlands) Michael van Gerwen | **2** | 15 | 11 |
| **3** | (England) Tony Eccles | **2** | 13 | 10 |
| **4** | (England) Martin Atkins | **0** | 5 | 18 |

- Group E

Niels de Ruiter 6–5 Ted Hankey
John Walton 5–6 Ronnie Baxter
Niels de Ruiter 6–4 John Walton
Ted Hankey 6–4 Ronnie Baxter
Niels de Ruiter 4–6 Ronnie Baxter
Ted Hankey 6–3 John Walton

| Pos | Name | **Wins** | Legs won | Legs lost |
|---|---|---|---|---|
| **1** | (England) Ted Hankey | **2** | 17 | 13 |
| **2** | (England) Ronnie Baxter | **2** | 16 | 15 |
| **3** | (Netherlands) Niels de Ruiter | **2** | 16 | 15 |
| **4** | (England) John Walton | **0** | 12 | 18 |

- Group F

Gary Anderson 6–3 Brian Sørensen
Paul Hogan 3–6 Per Laursen
Gary Anderson 3–6 Paul Hogan
Brian Sørensen 6–2 Per Laursen
Gary Anderson 6–4 Per Laursen
Brian Sørensen 5–6 Paul Hogan

| Pos | Name | **Wins** | Legs won | Legs lost |
|---|---|---|---|---|
| **1** | (Scotland) Gary Anderson | **2** | 15 | 13 |
| **2** | (England) Paul Hogan | **2** | 15 | 14 |
| **3** | (Denmark) Brian Sørensen | **1** | 14 | 14 |
| **4** | (Denmark) Per Laursen | **1** | 12 | 15 |

- Group G

Tony Martin 6–1 Shaun Greatbatch
Tony O'Shea 6–3 Mareno Michels
Tony Martin 3–6 Tony O'Shea
Shaun Greatbatch 6–3 Mareno Michels
Tony Martin 4–6 Mareno Michels
Shaun Greatbatch 6–5 Tony O'Shea

| Pos | Name | **Wins** | Legs won | Legs lost |
|---|---|---|---|---|
| **1** | (England) Tony O'Shea | **2** | 17 | 11 |
| **2** | (England) Shaun Greatbatch | **2** | 13 | 14 |
| **3** | (England) Tony Martin | **1** | 13 | 13 |
| **4** | (Netherlands) Mareno Michels | **1** | 12 | 16 |

- Group H

Martin Adams 6–3 Andy Fordham
Dick van Dijk 3–6 Jelle Klaasen
Martin Adams 6–3 Dick van Dijk
Andy Fordham 5–6 Jelle Klaasen
Martin Adams 6–4 Jelle Klaasen
Andy Fordham 4–6 Dick van Dijk

| Pos | Name | **Wins** | Legs won | Legs lost |
|---|---|---|---|---|
| **1** | (England) Martin Adams | **3** | 18 | 10 |
| **2** | (Netherlands) Jelle Klaasen | **2** | 16 | 14 |
| **3** | (Netherlands) Dick van Dijk | **1** | 12 | 16 |
| **4** | (England) Andy Fordham | **0** | 12 | 18 |

=== Second round ===
ROUND TWO "ROUND ROBIN" BEST OF 13 LEGS. BEST TWO IN EACH GROUP GO FORWARD TO QUARTER-Finals

- Group I

Raymond van Barneveld 7–5 Ronnie Baxter
Roland Scholten 7–4 Paul Hogan
Ronnie Baxter 7–2 Paul Hogan
Raymond van Barneveld 7–1 Roland Scholten
Raymond van Barneveld 7–5 Paul Hogan
Roland Scholten 7–6 Ronnie Baxter

| Pos | Name | **Wins** | Legs won | Legs lost |
|---|---|---|---|---|
| **1** | (Netherlands) Raymond van Barneveld | **3** | 21 | 11 |
| **2** | (Netherlands) Roland Scholten | **2** | 15 | 17 |
| **3** | (England) Ronnie Baxter | **1** | 18 | 16 |
| **4** | (England) Paul Hogan | **0** | 11 | 21 |

- Group J

Colin Lloyd 7–2 Jelle Klaasen
Phil Taylor 7–1 Shaun Greatbatch
Shaun Greatbatch 7–5 Jelle Klaasen
Phil Taylor 7–1 Colin Lloyd
Phil Taylor 6–7 Jelle Klaasen
Colin Lloyd 7–5 Shaun Greatbatch

| Pos | Name | **Wins** | Legs won | Legs lost |
|---|---|---|---|---|
| **1** | (England) Phil Taylor | **2** | 20 | 9 |
| **2** | (England) Colin Lloyd | **2** | 15 | 14 |
| **3** | (England) Shaun Greatbatch | **1** | 13 | 19 |
| **4** | (Netherlands) Jelle Klaasen | **1** | 14 | 20 |

- Group K

Gary Anderson 3–7 Simon Whitlock
Ted Hankey 7–6 Gary Robson
Ted Hankey 7–5 Gary Anderson
Gary Robson 4–7 Simon Whitlock
Gary Robson 7–2 Gary Anderson
Ted Hankey 7–2 Simon Whitlock

| Pos | Name | **Wins** | Legs won | Legs lost |
|---|---|---|---|---|
| **1** | (England) Ted Hankey | **3** | 21 | 13 |
| **2** | (Australia) Simon Whitlock | **2** | 16 | 14 |
| **3** | (England) Gary Robson | **1** | 17 | 16 |
| **4** | (Scotland) Gary Anderson | **0** | 10 | 21 |

- Group L

Tony O'Shea 6–7 Darryl Fitton
Martin Adams 6–7 Michael van Gerwen
Darryl Fitton 7–3 Michael van Gerwen
Tony O'Shea 4–7 Martin Adams
Tony O'Shea 2–7 Michael van Gerwen
Martin Adams 7–3 Darryl Fitton

| Pos | Name | **Wins** | Legs won | Legs lost |
|---|---|---|---|---|
| **1** | (England) Martin Adams | **2** | 20 | 14 |
| **2** | (Netherlands) Michael van Gerwen | **2** | 17 | 15 |
| **3** | (England) Darryl Fitton | **2** | 17 | 16 |
| **4** | (England) Tony O'Shea | **0** | 12 | 21 |

=== Knockout stages ===
Players in bold denote match winners.

Quarter-finals; Best of 11 sets best of three legs per set May 10
PDC | (Netherlands) **Raymond van Barneveld** 100.29 | 6
WDF | (Netherlands) Michael van Gerwen 97.14 | 3
PDC | (England) Phil Taylor 101.52 | 5
WDF | (Australia) **Simon Whitlock** 101.22 | 6
WDF | (England) Ted Hankey 93.18 | 3
PDC | (England) **Colin Lloyd** 86.55 | 6
WDF | (England) Martin Adams 94.50 | 4
PDC | (Netherlands) **Roland Scholten** 86.79 | 6

Semi-finals; Best of 17 sets best of three legs per set May 11
PDC | (Netherlands) **Raymond van Barneveld** 95.37 | 9
WDF | (Australia) Simon Whitlock 92.88 | 7
PDC | (England) **Colin Lloyd** 94.35 | 9
PDC | (Netherlands) Roland Scholten 93.18 | 8

Final; Best of 25 sets best of three legs per set May 12
PDC | (Netherlands) **Raymond van Barneveld** 99.54 | 13
PDC | (England) Colin Lloyd 95.25 | 5
