= 2016 European Darts Grand Prix =

Tournament information
- Dates: 16–18 September 2016
- Venue: Glaspalast
- Location: Sindelfingen, Germany
- Organisation(s): Professional Darts Corporation (PDC)
- Format: Legs
- Prize fund: £115,000
- Winner's share: £25,000
- High checkout: 170; Ian White; Michael van Gerwen

Champion(s)
- Michael van Gerwen (NED)

The 2016 European Darts Grand Prix was the ninth of ten PDC European Tour events on the 2016 PDC Pro Tour. The tournament took place at Glaspalast in Sindelfingen, Germany, from 16 to 18 September 2016. It featured a field of 48 players and £115,000 in prize money, with £25,000 going to the winner.

Kim Huybrechts was the defending champion, but lost in the semi-finals to Michael van Gerwen. Van Gerwen went on to win the title after defeating Peter Wright 6–2 in the final.

== Prize money ==
The prize money of the European Tour events stays the same as last year.

Stage (num. of players)		Prize money
Winner	(1)	£25,000
Runner-up	(1)	£10,000
Semi-finalists	(2)	£5,000
Quarter-finalists	(4)	£3,500
Third round losers	(8)	£2,000
Second round losers	(16)	£1,500
First round losers	(16)	£1,000
Total	£115,000	

== Qualification and format ==
The top 16 players from the PDC ProTour Order of Merit on 27 July automatically qualified for the event and were seeded in the second round. The remaining 32 places went to players from three qualifying events - 20 from the UK Qualifier (held in Barnsley on 5 August), eight from the European Qualifier and four from the Host Nation Qualifier (both held on 15 September).

Daryl Gurney who had to withdraw from the last two European Tour events due to a broken finger on his throwing hand, also pulled out of this event after failing to recover. Third seed Dave Chisnall also withdrew due to a neck injury, moving seeds 4-16 up a place, and promoting UK Qualifier Steve Beaton to 16th seed.

Arron Monk also withdrew for personal reasons the day the tournament began, thus giving Robbie Green a bye to the second round. The remaining places were filled with two additional Host Nation Qualifiers.

The following players took part in the tournament:

Top 16
1. (Netherlands) Michael van Gerwen (winner)
2. (Scotland) Peter Wright (runner-up)
3. (England) Ian White (second round)
4. (Belgium) Kim Huybrechts (semi-finals)
5. (England) Michael Smith (third round)
6. (Netherlands) Benito van de Pas (quarter-finals)
7. (England) James Wade (quarter-finals)
8. (Austria) Mensur Suljović (third round)
9. (Wales) Gerwyn Price (quarter-finals)
10. (Netherlands) Jelle Klaasen (second round)
11. (England) Terry Jenkins (second round)
12. (England) Stephen Bunting (quarter-finals)
13. (England) Alan Norris (third round)
14. (Australia) Simon Whitlock (second round)
15. (England) Joe Cullen (third round)
16. (England) Steve Beaton (third round)

UK Qualifier
- (Northern Ireland) ~~Daryl Gurney~~ (withdrew)
- (England) ~~Arron Monk~~ (withdrew)
- (England) Andy Boulton (first round)
- (Wales) Jonny Clayton (third round)
- (England) Scott Dale (first round)
- (England) Nathan Aspinall (second round)
- (England) James Wilson (third round)
- (Republic of Ireland) Mick McGowan (second round)
- (England) Robbie Green (second round)
- (Northern Ireland) Brendan Dolan (second round)
- (Wales) Robert Owen (first round)
- (England) James Hubbard (first round)
- (England) Jay Foreman (first round)
- (England) Mark Frost (second round)
- (England) Scott Taylor (first round)
- (England) Alan Tabern (second round)
- (England) Joe Murnan (third round)
- (South Africa) Devon Petersen (first round)
- (England) Darren Webster (second round)

European Qualifier
- (Netherlands) Raymond van Barneveld (semi-finals)
- (Spain) Cristo Reyes (second round)
- (Netherlands) Christian Kist (first round)
- (Belgium) Ronny Huybrechts (first round)
- (Netherlands) Jermaine Wattimena (second round)
- (Netherlands) Jeffrey de Graaf (first round)
- (Croatia) Robert Marijanović (first round)
- (England) Tony West (second round)

Host Nation Qualifier
- (Germany) Max Hopp (second round)
- (Germany) Dragutin Horvat (first round)
- (Germany) Martin Schindler (second round)
- (Germany) Fabian Herz (first round)
- (Germany) Robert Allenstein (first round)
- (Germany) Gabriel Clemens (first round)

== Draw ==
First round (best of 11 legs); 16 September
(England) Darren Webster 95.94	6
(Germany) Robert Allenstein 89.94	0
(England) Alan Tabern 87.38	6
(England) Scott Taylor 80.55	2
(Belgium) Ronny Huybrechts 88.29	3
(Republic of Ireland) Mick McGowan 98.32	6
(Germany) Max Hopp 88.66	6
(England) James Hubbard 75.22	2
(Netherlands) Jeffrey de Graaf 73.47	2
(England) Tony West 76.20	6
(Netherlands) Jermaine Wattimena 89.53	6
(Germany) Fabian Herz 86.85	3
(England) Andy Boulton 85.81	4
(Germany) Martin Schindler 89.38	6
(England) Nathan Aspinall 90.23	6
(England) Jay Foreman 85.80	4
(Northern Ireland) Brendan Dolan 88.30	6
(Netherlands) Christian Kist 80.02	5
(England) Robbie Green	w/o
(England) Arron Monk	w/d
(England) Mark Frost 78.75	6
(Wales) Robert Owen 79.20	5
(Wales) Jonny Clayton 89.87	6
(Germany) Gabriel Clemens 81.06	1
(Spain) Cristo Reyes 93.90	6
(Croatia) Robert Marijanović 82.98	3
(England) Joe Murnan 92.83	6
(Germany) Dragutin Horvat 83.60	2
(England) James Wilson 89.23	6
(South Africa) Devon Petersen 89.78	3
(Netherlands) Raymond van Barneveld 99.73	6
(England) Scott Dale 89.05	3

Second round (best of 11 legs); 17 September
1	(Netherlands) Michael van Gerwen 104.04	6
(England) Darren Webster 94.30	4
16	(England) Steve Beaton 91.34	6
(England) Alan Tabern 85.20	3
8	(Austria) Mensur Suljović 108.45	6
(Republic of Ireland) Mick McGowan 87.66	2
9	(Wales) Gerwyn Price 93.30	6
(Germany) Max Hopp 89.60	3
5	(England) Michael Smith 91.99	6
(England) Tony West 81.40	3
12	(England) Stephen Bunting 89.81	6
(Netherlands) Jermaine Wattimena 87.66	2
4	(Belgium) Kim Huybrechts 92.02	6
(Germany) Martin Schindler 77.16	0
13	(England) Alan Norris 94.93	6
(England) Nathan Aspinall 82.00	0
2	(Scotland) Peter Wright 94.49	6
(Northern Ireland) Brendan Dolan 86.66	1
15	(England) Joe Cullen 98.35	6
(England) Robbie Green 87.51	1
7	(England) James Wade 87.70	6
(England) Mark Frost 86.24	4
10	(Netherlands) Jelle Klaasen 91.71	1
(Wales) Jonny Clayton 102.33	6
6	(Netherlands) Benito van de Pas 98.11	6
(Spain) Cristo Reyes 87.97	5
11	(England) Terry Jenkins 89.93	5
(England) Joe Murnan 93.29	6
3	(England) Ian White 96.39	3
(England) James Wilson 99.32	6
14	(Australia) Simon Whitlock 97.41	5
(Netherlands) Raymond van Barneveld 93.50	6

Third round (best of 11 legs); 18 September
1	(Netherlands) van Gerwen 97.86	6
16	(England) Beaton 88.73	3
8	(Austria) Suljović 100.42	3
9	(Wales) Price 101.30	6
5	(England) Smith 93.38	2
12	(England) Bunting 90.90	6
4	(Belgium) Huybrechts 96.40	6
13	(England) Norris 88.65	2
2	(Scotland) Wright 102.68	6
15	(England) Cullen 97.91	1
7	(England) Wade 102.30	6
(Wales) Clayton 97.56	3
6	(Netherlands) van de Pas 96.22	6
(England) Murnan 86.55	2
(England) Wilson 99.37	3
(Netherlands) van Barneveld 108.03	6

Quarter-finals (best of 11 legs); 18 September
1	(Netherlands) van Gerwen 94.42	6
9	(Wales) Price 93.87	3
12	(England) Bunting 87.67	5
4	(Belgium) Huybrechts 88.45	6
2	(Scotland) Wright 106.14	6
7	(England) Wade 99.68	3
6	(Netherlands) van de Pas 91.44	1
(Netherlands) van Barneveld 94.95	6

Semi-finals (best of 11 legs); 18 September
1	(Netherlands) van Gerwen 107.36	6
4	(Belgium) Huybrechts 99.92	0
2	(Scotland) Wright 103.43	6
(Netherlands) van Barneveld 91.70	2

Final (best of 11 legs); 18 September
1	(Netherlands) van Gerwen 105.38	6
2	(Scotland) Wright 102.36	2
