= 2015 World Matchplay =

2015 BetVictor World Matchplay

Tournament information
- Dates: 18–26 July 2015
- Venue: Winter Gardens
- Location: Blackpool, England
- Organisation(s): Professional Darts Corporation (PDC)
- Format: Legs
- Prize fund: £450,000
- Winner's share: £100,000
- High checkout: 170 Brendan Dolan

Champion(s)
- Michael van Gerwen (NED)

The 2015 BetVictor World Matchplay was the 22nd annual staging of the World Matchplay, organised by the Professional Darts Corporation. The tournament took place at the Winter Gardens, Blackpool, from 18 to 26 July 2015.

Phil Taylor was the defending champion, having won the last seven editions of the event and he reached the semi-finals, where his 38-game unbeaten run came to the end against James Wade. Michael van Gerwen won his first World Matchplay title by defeating Wade 18–12 in the final.

== Prize money ==
The prize fund was increased to £450,000 after being £400,000 for the previous five editions of this event.

Position (no. of players)		Prize money (Total: £450,000)
Winner	(1)	£100,000
Runner-Up	(1)	£50,000
Semi-finalists	(2)	£27,000
Quarter-finalists	(4)	£17,500
Second round	(8)	£10,000
First round	(16)	£6,000

== Format ==
In previous stagings of the event all games had to be won by two clear legs with no sudden-death legs. However, in 2013 after consulting the host broadcaster Sky Sports, the PDC decided that games will now only proceed for a maximum of six extra legs before a tie-break leg is required. For example, in a best of 19 legs first round match, if the score reaches 12–12 then the 25th leg will be the decider.

== Qualification ==
The top 16 on the PDC Order of Merit qualified as seeded players. The other 16 places went to the top 16 non-qualified players from the PDC ProTour Order of Merit who were unseeded players. The field was confirmed on 5 July following Players Championship 14.

=== PDC Order of Merit Top 16 ===
1. (Netherlands) Michael van Gerwen (winner)
2. (England) Phil Taylor (semi-finals)
3. (Scotland) Gary Anderson (second round)
4. (England) Adrian Lewis (second round)
5. (Scotland) Peter Wright (semi-finals)
6. (England) James Wade (runner-up)
7. (England) Dave Chisnall (quarter-finals)
8. (Australia) Simon Whitlock (second round)
9. (England) Ian White (quarter-finals)
10. (Scotland) Robert Thornton (first round)
11. (Northern Ireland) Brendan Dolan (second round)
12. (England) Mervyn King (first round)
13. (England) Michael Smith (first round)
14. (England) Terry Jenkins (first round)
15. (Netherlands) Raymond van Barneveld (first round)
16. (England) Justin Pipe (first round)

=== PDC ProTour qualifiers ===
1. (Belgium) Kim Huybrechts (first round)
2. (Netherlands) Jelle Klaasen (first round)
3. (Netherlands) Vincent van der Voort (first round)
4. (Netherlands) Benito van de Pas (first round)
5. (England) Stephen Bunting (first round)
6. (Austria) Mensur Suljović (quarter-finals)
7. (Wales) Gerwyn Price (quarter-finals)
8. (England) Steve Beaton (first round)
9. (England) Jamie Caven (first round)
10. (Scotland) John Henderson (first round)
11. (England) Keegan Brown (second round)
12. (England) Andrew Gilding (second round)
13. (Wales) Jamie Lewis (second round)
14. (England) Joe Murnan (first round)
15. (Australia) Kyle Anderson (first round)
16. (England) Andy Hamilton (second round)

== Draw ==
First round (best of 19 legs); 18–20 July
1	(Netherlands) Michael van Gerwen 99.19	10
(Netherlands) Benito van de Pas 93.62	4
16	(England) Justin Pipe 90.08	7
(Wales) Jamie Lewis 92.43	10
8	(Australia) Simon Whitlock 98.45	10
(Netherlands) Jelle Klaasen 91.46	4
9	(England) Ian White 103.51	10
(England) Stephen Bunting 101.62	6
5	(Scotland) Peter Wright 108.13	10
(Belgium) Kim Huybrechts 95.82	5
12	(England) Mervyn King 94.99	8
(England) Andrew Gilding 96.72	10
4	(England) Adrian Lewis 99.06	10
(England) Joe Murnan 93.79	7
13	(England) Michael Smith 91.17	4
(Wales) Gerwyn Price 92.59	10
2	(England) Phil Taylor 95.30	10
(Scotland) John Henderson 81.86	2
15	(Netherlands) Raymond van Barneveld 89.08	7
(England) Andy Hamilton 95.90	10
7	(England) Dave Chisnall 94.63	13
(England) Jamie Caven 92.57	11
10	(Scotland) Robert Thornton 92.90	7
(England) Keegan Brown 97.00	10
6	(England) James Wade 103.59	10
(Australia) Kyle Anderson 99.06	7
11	(Northern Ireland) Brendan Dolan 88.52	10
(Netherlands) Vincent van der Voort 92.78	6
3	(Scotland) Gary Anderson 95.59	10
(England) Steve Beaton 89.70	4
14	(England) Terry Jenkins 90.24	9
(Austria) Mensur Suljović 89.57	11

Second round (best of 25 legs); 21–22 July
1	(Netherlands) Michael van Gerwen 110.93	13
(Wales) Jamie Lewis 98.86	2
8	(Australia) Simon Whitlock 92.43	9
9	(England) Ian White 97.11	13
5	(Scotland) Peter Wright 95.65	13
(England) Andrew Gilding 90.79	7
4	(England) Adrian Lewis 99.20	10
(Wales) Gerwyn Price 97.88	13
2	(England) Phil Taylor 99.37	13
(England) Andy Hamilton 89.71	6
7	(England) Dave Chisnall 96.04	13
(England) Keegan Brown 89.63	11
6	(England) James Wade 94.67	13
11	(Northern Ireland) Brendan Dolan 90.87	8
3	(Scotland) Gary Anderson 94.29	9
(Austria) Mensur Suljović 92.58	13

Quarter-finals (best of 31 legs); 23–24 July
1	(Netherlands) Michael van Gerwen 102.04	16
9	(England) Ian White 96.42	13
5	(Scotland) Peter Wright 98.27	16
(Wales) Gerwyn Price 88.17	7
2	(England) Phil Taylor 102.68	16
7	(England) Dave Chisnall 102.94	8
6	(England) James Wade 100.20	16
(Austria) Mensur Suljović 92.48	11

Semi-finals (best of 33 legs); 25 July
1	(Netherlands) Michael van Gerwen 101.96	17
5	(Scotland) Peter Wright 102.44	12
2	(England) Phil Taylor 103.69	14
6	(England) James Wade 97.85	17

Final (best of 35 legs); 26 July
1	(Netherlands) Michael van Gerwen 99.91	18
6	(England) James Wade 90.37	12

== Statistics ==
Player	Eliminated	Played	Legs Won	Legs Lost	LWAT	100+	140+	180s	High checkout	3-dart average	Checkout success
(Netherlands) Michael van Gerwen	Winner	5	74	43	28	127	98	39	156	102.81	46.25%
(England) James Wade	Final	5	68	58	25	195	103	17	150	97.34	41.98%
(Scotland) Peter Wright	Semi-finals	4	51	36	18	118	81	29	161	101.12	45.54%
(England) Phil Taylor	Semi-finals	4	53	33	24	112	59	26	161	100.27	39.85%
(England) Ian White	Quarter-finals	3	36	31	10	76	46	25	127	99.01	37.11%
(England) Dave Chisnall	Quarter-finals	3	34	38	9	84	43	29	136	97.87	31.19%
(Wales) Gerwyn Price	Quarter-finals	3	30	30	13	81	34	16	120	92.88	41.10%
(Austria) Mensur Suljović	Quarter-finals	3	35	34	16	111	54	10	128	91.54	35.71%
(England) Adrian Lewis	Second round	2	20	20	10	37	31	16	136	99.13	44.44%
(Wales) Jamie Lewis	Second round	2	12	20	2	40	30	4	128	95.65	50%
(Australia) Simon Whitlock	Second round	2	19	17	5	33	25	10	78	95.44	41.30%
(Scotland) Gary Anderson	Second round	2	19	17	8	38	26	13	118	94.94	33.93%
(England) Andrew Gilding	Second round	2	17	21	6	51	25	6	121	93.76	42.50%
(England) Keegan Brown	Second round	2	21	20	5	51	26	9	114	93.32	43.75%
(England) Andy Hamilton	Second round	2	16	20	7	43	24	5	158	92.66	34.78%
(Northern Ireland) Brendan Dolan	Second round	2	18	19	7	43	22	7	170	89.70	32.14%
(England) Stephen Bunting	First round	1	6	10	1	18	6	9	49	101.62	33.33%
(Australia) Kyle Anderson	First round	1	7	10	3	26	5	9	124	99.06	30.43%
(Belgium) Kim Huybrechts	First round	1	5	10	1	30	6	1	101	95.82	41.67%
(England) Mervyn King	First round	1	8	10	3	14	12	6	90	94.99	42.11%
(England) Joe Murnan	First round	1	7	10	3	21	13	2	86	93.79	41.18%
(Netherlands) Benito van de Pas	First round	1	4	10	3	12	8	3	66	93.62	40.00%
(Scotland) Robert Thornton	First round	1	7	10	2	21	14	4	81	92.90	41.18%
(Netherlands) Vincent van der Voort	First round	1	6	10	3	25	9	4	68	92.78	26.09%
(England) Jamie Caven	First round	1	11	13	2	42	11	3	60	92.70	37.93%
(Netherlands) Jelle Klaasen	First round	1	4	10	1	20	3	3	108	91.46	40.00%
(England) Michael Smith	First round	1	4	10	1	13	11	1	121	91.17	33.33%
(England) Terry Jenkins	First round	1	9	11	4	28	16	6	140	90.24	28.13%
(England) Justin Pipe	First round	1	7	10	1	26	10	5	116	90.08	26.92%
(England) Steve Beaton	First round	1	4	10	2	21	9	1	40	89.7	16.67%
(Netherlands) Raymond van Barneveld	First round	1	7	10	2	22	12	3	96	89.08	33.33%
(Scotland) John Henderson	First round	1	2	10	1	22	1	2	26	81.86	33.33%

Source: Match reports from the draw.
