= 2015 European Championship (darts) =

2015 Unibet European Championship

Tournament information
- Dates: 30 October–1 November 2015
- Venue: Etihas Arena
- Location: Hasselt
- Country: Belgium
- Organisation(s): PDC
- Format: Legs
- Prize fund: £300,000
- Winner's share: £65,000
- High checkout: 161 (Wales) Gerwyn Price (England) Phil Taylor

Champion(s)
- (Netherlands) Michael van Gerwen

The 2015 Unibet European Championship was the eighth edition of the Professional Darts Corporation tournament, the European Championship, which saw the top European players compete against the highest ranked players from the PDC Order of Merit. The tournament took place from 30 October–1 November 2015 at the Ethias Arena in Hasselt, Belgium.

Michael van Gerwen was the defending champion, having beaten Terry Jenkins 11–4 in the final of the 2014 tournament, and he retained his title by overcoming Gary Anderson 11–10, having trailed 10-7. It was the first time Van Gerwen had successfully defended a major title.

== Prize money ==
The 2015 European Championship had a total prize fund of £300,000, a £50,000 increase since the previous staging of the tournament. The following is the breakdown of the fund:

| Position (no. of players) | | Prize money (Total: £300,000) |
|---|---|---|
| Winner | (1) | £65,000 |
| Runner-Up | (1) | £35,000 |
| Semi-finalists | (2) | £17,000 |
| Quarter-finalists | (4) | £11,500 |
| Last 16 (second round) | (8) | £7,000 |
| Last 32 (first round) | (16) | £4,000 |

== Qualification ==
The top 16 players from the PDC Order of Merit on 19 October automatically qualified for the event. The top eight non-qualified players from the Pro Tour Order of Merit were added to the tournament. The remaining places were filled by European qualifiers, with the top seven players from the European Order of Merit and a Scandinavian qualifier. The top eight from the PDC Order of Merit were seeded in the tournament.

These were the participants:

PDC Top 16
1. (Netherlands) Michael van Gerwen (champion)
2. (Scotland) Gary Anderson (runner-up)
3. (England) Phil Taylor (quarter-finals)
4. (Scotland) Peter Wright (semi-finals)
5. (Scotland) Robert Thornton (first round)
6. (England) Adrian Lewis (semi-finals)
7. (England) James Wade (second round)
8. (England) Ian White (first round)
9. (England) Michael Smith (second round)
10. (Belgium) Kim Huybrechts (second round)
11. (England) Terry Jenkins (first round)
12. (Australia) Simon Whitlock (second round)
13. (Northern Ireland) Brendan Dolan (first round)
14. (England) Mervyn King (first round)
15. (England) Dave Chisnall (quarter-finals)
16. (Netherlands) Vincent van der Voort (first round)

Pro Tour Order of Merit qualifiers
1. (Netherlands) Jelle Klaasen (quarter-finals)
2. (England) Justin Pipe (second round)
3. (Austria) Mensur Suljović (first round)
4. (Netherlands) Benito van de Pas (first round)
5. (England) Stephen Bunting (second round)
6. (Wales) Gerwyn Price (first round)
7. (England) Alan Norris (first round)
8. (Scotland) John Henderson (quarter-finals)

European qualifiers
1. (Netherlands) Raymond van Barneveld (first round)
2. (Netherlands) Christian Kist (first round)
3. (Austria) Rowby-John Rodriguez (second round)
4. (Spain) Cristo Reyes (second round)
5. (Germany) Max Hopp (first round)
6. (Netherlands) Dirk van Duijvenbode (first round)
7. (Netherlands) Jeffrey de Zwaan (first round)

Scandinavian Qualifier
1. (Sweden) Magnus Caris (first round)

== Draw ==
The draw was held on 20 October 2015.

First round (best of 11 legs); 30 October
1 | (Netherlands) Michael van Gerwen 100.37 | 6
(Netherlands) Jeffrey de Zwaan 88.81 | 3
(Germany) Max Hopp 86.70 | 2
(Spain) Cristo Reyes 100.69 | 6
8 | (England) Ian White 97.72 | 5
(England) Stephen Bunting 93.78 | 6
(England) Dave Chisnall 100.66 | 6
(Austria) Mensur Suljović 99.31 | 5
5 | (Scotland) Robert Thornton 95.66 | 4
(Scotland) John Henderson 96.84 | 6
(Netherlands) Christian Kist 85.47 | 4
(Austria) Rowby-John Rodriguez 84.15 | 6
4 | (Scotland) Peter Wright 95.44 | 6
(England) Alan Norris 90.70 | 3
(England) Mervyn King 95.81 | 3
(Belgium) Kim Huybrechts 100.86 | 6
2 | (Scotland) Gary Anderson 96.42 | 6
(Northern Ireland) Brendan Dolan 94.00 | 3
(Australia) Simon Whitlock 95.85 | 6
(Sweden) Magnus Caris 86.27 | 2
7 | (England) James Wade 88.66 | 6
(England) Terry Jenkins 90.00 | 3
(Netherlands) Raymond van Barneveld 98.35 | 4
(Netherlands) Jelle Klaasen 97.85 | 6
6 | (England) Adrian Lewis 94.37 | 6
(Netherlands) Benito van de Pas 94.58 | 5
(England) Justin Pipe 91.87 | 6
(Netherlands) Dirk van Duijvenbode 85.44 | 2
3 | (England) Phil Taylor 100.24 | 6
(Netherlands) Vincent van der Voort 97.49 | 1
(England) Michael Smith 98.44 | 6
(Wales) Gerwyn Price 97.95 | 4

Second round (best of 19 legs); 31 October
1 | (Netherlands) Michael van Gerwen 106.81 | 10
(Spain) Cristo Reyes 91.65 | 3
(England) Stephen Bunting 102.27 | 6
(England) Dave Chisnall 103.86 | 10
(Scotland) John Henderson 84.38 | 10
(Austria) Rowby-John Rodriguez 73.43 | 2
4 | (Scotland) Peter Wright 102.93 | 10
(Belgium) Kim Huybrechts 96.65 | 8
2 | (Scotland) Gary Anderson 96.28 | 10
(Australia) Simon Whitlock 93.47 | 8
7 | (England) James Wade 95.76 | 5
(Netherlands) Jelle Klaasen 99.76 | 10
6 | (England) Adrian Lewis 101.07 | 10
(England) Justin Pipe 88.15 | 7
3 | (England) Phil Taylor 105.25 | 10
(England) Michael Smith 98.53 | 5

Quarter-finals (best of 19 legs); 1 November
1 | (Netherlands) Michael van Gerwen 106.55 | 10
(England) Dave Chisnall 97.52 | 4
(Scotland) John Henderson 88.77 | 4
4 | (Scotland) Peter Wright 102.19 | 10
2 | (Scotland) Gary Anderson 103.24 | 10
(Netherlands) Jelle Klaasen 94.59 | 6
6 | (England) Adrian Lewis 98.97 | 10
3 | (England) Phil Taylor 106.12 | 9

Semi-finals (best of 21 legs); 1 November
1 | (Netherlands) Michael van Gerwen 104.76 | 11
4 | (Scotland) Peter Wright 104.74 | 7
2 | (Scotland) Gary Anderson 106.26 | 11
6 | (England) Adrian Lewis 97.01 | 5

Final (best of 21 legs); 1 November
1 | (Netherlands) Michael van Gerwen 107.28 | 11
2 | (Scotland) Gary Anderson 102.42 | 10

== Broadcasting ==
On 14 June 2013, the PDC announced that the European Championship would be broadcast in the United Kingdom on ITV4 for the next three years. The tournament was available in the following countries on these channels:

| Country | Channel |
|---|---|
| United Kingdom | ITV4 |
| Netherlands | RTL 7 |
| Germany | Sport1/Sport1+ |
| (Republic of Ireland) Ireland | Setanta Sports |
| Middle East | OSN |
| Australia | Fox Sports |
| New Zealand | Sky Sport (New Zealand) |
| United States | ESPN |
| Czech Republic | Nova Sport 2 |
