= 2006 BDO World Darts Championship =

Tournament information
- Dates: 7–15 January 2006
- Venue: Lakeside Country Club
- Location: Frimley Green, Surrey
- Country: England, United Kingdom
- Organisation(s): BDO
- Format: Sets; Finals: best of 13 (men's) best of 3 (women's)
- Prize fund: £263,000
- Winner's share: £60,000
- High checkout: 161 (England) Martin Adams (England) Mervyn King (Scotland) Paul Hanvidge

Champion(s)
- (Netherlands) Jelle Klaasen

The 2006 BDO World Darts Championship (known for sponsorship reasons as the 2006 Lakeside World Professional Darts Championship) was held from 7 to 15 January 2006 at the Lakeside Country Club in Frimley Green, Surrey. Defending champion Raymond van Barneveld was aiming to win a fifth BDO world title, equalling the record set by Eric Bristow. However, he was beaten 7–5 in the final by Dutch qualifier Jelle Klaasen; the final was the first and only World Darts Championship final to not feature a British player. Klaasen became the youngest World Champion at age 21 and became the first qualifier to win the World Championship since Keith Deller in 1983, who became the youngest World Champion himself, aged 23. This would eventually be Van Barneveld's last appearance at the BDO World Championships as he would switch to the rival Professional Darts Corporation the next month.

It was the only BDO Men's World Championship that had no representative from Wales.

== Seeds ==
Men

1. (England) Mervyn King
2. (England) Martin Adams
3. (Netherlands) Raymond van Barneveld
4. (Australia) Simon Whitlock
5. (England) Tony Eccles
6. (England) Tony O'Shea
7. (England) John Walton
8. (England) Ted Hankey

== Changes ==
The 2006 championship was the last to be staged under the eight seeds format. For the 2007 event the number of seeded players for the men's championship was increased to 16. 2006 would also see a new format for the tournament with second round matches extended to the best of seven sets, as had been requested by numerous players down the years. The semi-finals were also extended to best of 11 sets and the final a best of 13 set affair.

== Prize money ==
The prize money was £209,000 for the men's event and £11,000 for the women's event.

Men's Champion: £60,000
Runner-Up: £25,000
Semi-Finalists (2): £11,000
Quarter-Finalists (4): £6,000
Last 16 (8): £4,250
Last 32 (16): £2,750

There was also a shared 9 Dart Checkout prize of £52,000, along with a High Checkout prize of £2,000 per event. Source:

== Results ==
=== Men's ===
- Match distances in sets are quoted in brackets at the top of each round. All sets best of five legs, unless there is a final set tie-break.

First Round (best of 5 sets)
1	(England) Mervyn King (93.24)	3
(England) Brian Woods (Q) (89.04)	0
(Netherlands) Jelle Klaasen (Q) (89.94)	3
(England) Dennis Harbour (Q) (85.32)	2
8	(England) Ted Hankey (83.25)	1
(Netherlands) Albertino Essers (83.88)	3
(England) Paul Hogan (87.84)	3
(Netherlands) Mareno Michels (83.67)	0
5	(England) Tony Eccles (84.57)	2
(Denmark) Per Laursen (85.38)	3
(England) Shaun Greatbatch (85.38)	3
(Netherlands) Niels de Ruiter (84.57)	2
4	(Australia) Simon Whitlock (92.13)	3
(England) Andy Fordham (87.27)	0
(Scotland) Paul Hanvidge (85.14)	3
(Netherlands) Co Stompé (81.87)	1
2	(England) Martin Adams (89.76)	3
(England) Darryl Fitton (90.48)	1
(England) Martin Atkins (93.93)	3
(Republic of Ireland) Gerald Porter (Q) (77.55)	0
7	(England) John Walton (77.82)	0
(England) Stephen Roberts (Q)(86.19)	3
(Scotland) Mike Veitch (96.45)	3
(Finland) Ulf Ceder (Q) (93.24)	1
6	(England) Tony O'Shea (90.90)	3
(England) Tony West (84.15)	1
(Netherlands) Vincent van der Voort (87.66)	3
(Scotland) Ross Montgomery (Q) (87.75)	1
3	(Netherlands) Raymond van Barneveld (85.83)	3
(Denmark) Brian Sørensen (77.64)	0
(Scotland) Gary Anderson (79.92)	3
(England) Gary Robson (80.94)	1

Second round (best of 7)
1	(England) Mervyn King (93.33)	2
(Netherlands) Jelle Klaasen (90.36)	4
(Netherlands) Albertino Essers (85.62)	2
(England) Paul Hogan (85.65)	4
(Denmark) Per Laursen (79.44)	2
(England) Shaun Greatbatch (79.83)	4
4	(Australia) Simon Whitlock (84.69)	2
(Scotland) Paul Hanvidge (87.99)	4
2	(England) Martin Adams (97.86)	4
(England) Martin Atkins (95.19)	3
(England) Stephen Roberts (82.47)	3
(Scotland) Mike Veitch (87.39)	4
6	(England) Tony O'Shea (87.90)	4
(Netherlands) Vincent van der Voort (84.27)	0
3	(Netherlands) Raymond van Barneveld (96.51)	4
(Scotland) Gary Anderson (93.84)	1

Quarter-Finals (best of 9)
(Netherlands) Jelle Klaasen (90.18)	5
(England) Paul Hogan (87.39)	4
(England) Shaun Greatbatch (87.09)	5
(Scotland) Paul Hanvidge (85.38)	3
2	(England) Martin Adams (88.98)	5
(Scotland) Mike Veitch (88.89)	2
6	(England) Tony O'Shea (89.25)	3
3	(Netherlands) Raymond van Barneveld (93.93)	5

Semi-Finals (best of 11)
(Netherlands) Jelle Klaasen (89.49)	6
(England) Shaun Greatbatch (83.31)	3
2	(England) Martin Adams (92.88)	2
3	(Netherlands) Raymond van Barneveld (96.21)	6

Final (best of 13)
(Netherlands) Jelle Klaasen (90.42)	7
3	(Netherlands) Raymond van Barneveld (93.06)	5

== The 2006 Lakeside Woman World Professional Darts Championship ==
Lakeside World Darts Championship

Tournament information
- Dates: 7–15 January 2006
- Venue: Lakeside Country Club
- Location: Frimley Green, Surrey
- Country: England, United Kingdom
- Organisation(s): BDO
- Format: Sets best of 3 (women's)
- Prize fund: £263,000
- Winner's share: £60,000

Champion(s)
- (England) Trina Gulliver

In the women's tournament, Trina Gulliver continued her domination of the women's game by winning her sixth successive title, defeating Francis Hoenselaar 2–0. It was the third successive year that Gulliver and Hoenselaar had met in the final and the fourth time in five years.

== Seeds ==
Women

1. (England) Trina Gulliver
2. (Netherlands) Francis Hoenselaar
3. (Netherlands) Karin Krappen
4. (England) Claire Bywaters

== Prize money ==
£11,000 for the women's event.

Women's Champion: £6,000
Runner-Up: £2,000
Semi-Finalists (2): £1,000
Quarter-Finalists (4): £500

=== Women ===
Quarter-Finals
1	(England) Trina Gulliver (85.89)	2
(England) Karen Littler (71.19)	0
4	(England) Clare Bywaters (71.01)	2
(Switzerland) Sabine Beutler (60.09)	0
2	(Netherlands) Francis Hoenselaar (74.09)	2
(England) Karen Lawman (71.67)	0
3	(Netherlands) Karin Krappen (75.12)	0
(Wales) Jan Robbins (73.98)	2

Semi-Finals
1	(England) Trina Gulliver (95.97)	2
4	(England) Clare Bywaters (68.73)	0
2	(Netherlands) Francis Hoenselaar (72.84)	2
(Wales) Jan Robbins (64.98)	0

Final
1	(England) Trina Gulliver (73.08)	2
2	(Netherlands) Francis Hoenselaar (70.26)	0
