= Tony Martin (darts player) =

English darts player

Personal information
- Born: 10 May 1981 (age 45) Ellesmere Port, Cheshire, England
- Home town: Liverpool, Merseyside, England

Sport
- Sport: Darts
- Playing since: 1999
- Darts: 24 Gram Jocky Wilson
- Laterality: Right-handed
- Walk-on music: "Be Faithful" by Fatman Scoop ft. Faith Evans

Organisation (see split in darts)
- BDO: 2002–2006, 2008–2010, 2011–2017, 2019–2020
- PDC: 2006–2008, 2010–2011, 2017–2019
- WDF: 2019–

WDF major events – best performances
- World Championship: Last 32: 2005
- World Masters: Last 128: 2002, 2003, 2006
- World Trophy: Last 32: 2005, 2006
- Int. Darts League: Last 32 Group: 2005, 2006
- Finder Masters: Last 24 Group: 2004

PDC premier events – best performances
- UK Open: Last 96: 2007

Other tournament wins
- Tournament: Years
- Italian Open Slovak Masters: 2019; 2019

Tony Martin (born 10 May 1981) is an English professional darts player who plays in Professional Darts Corporation (PDC) events.

== Career ==
Martin started his darts career playing in British Darts Organisation tournaments and was a runner-up in the British Classic to Mervyn King in 2002. He reached other finals at the Swedish Open in 2004, losing to Shaun Greatbatch and the Norway Open in 2005, which he lost to Michael van Gerwen. He also reached the quarter finals of the Dutch Open in 2004.

Tony started playing with Merseyside youth at the age of 18. At the age of 21, he was selected to play for the county of Clwyd. In his first season, he gained the British Darts Organisation Young Player of the Year Award.

He only managed to appear once at the Lakeside Country Club for the BDO World Darts Championship when he lost a first round match in 2005 to Simon Whitlock.

He switched to compete in the Professional Darts Corporation for several months but announced in August 2007 that he would be returning to compete on the BDO circuit. He lost his main sponsor Masterdarts also. He also switched to be on the same circuit as his wife Anastasia Dobromyslova. His wife moved across to the PDC in December 2008, which in turn left Martin playing on a different circuit again. It was announced however during the 2009 Grand Slam of Darts that Martin would be competing in the PDC once more, starting in January 2010.

However his season in the PDC was difficult as he suffered from loss of form and had injury problems, As a result, he did not get a tour card.

== World Championship performances ==
=== BDO ===
- 2005: 1st Round (lost to Simon Whitlock 1–3)
