= Simon Whitlock =

Australian darts player (born 1969)

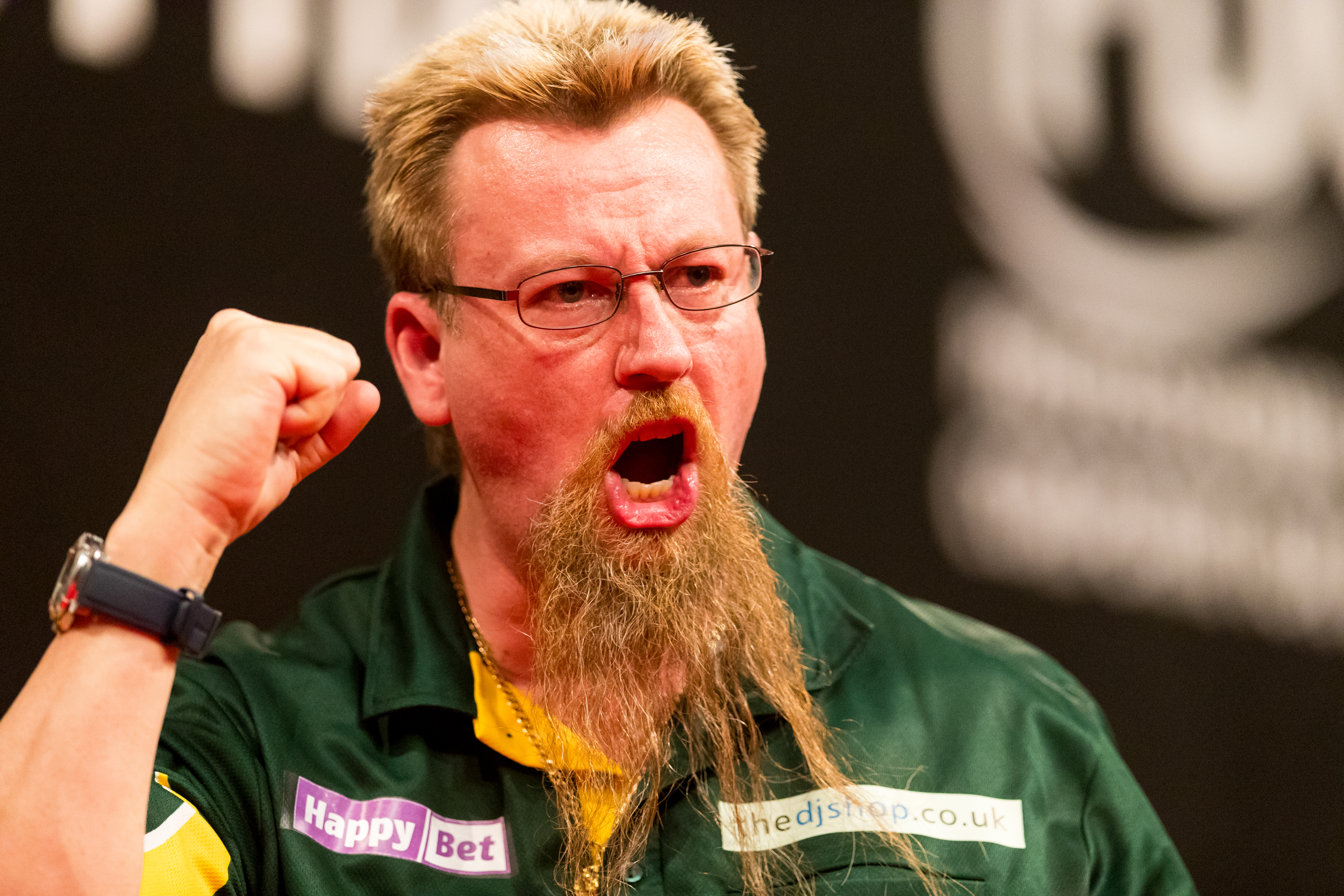
- Whitlock in 2017

Personal information
- Nickname: "The Wizard"
- Born: 3 March 1969 (age 57) Cessnock, New South Wales, Australia
- Home town: Hornsby, Australia and Waterlooville, England

Sport
- Sport: Darts
- Playing since: 1984
- Darts: 23g Winmau Signature
- Laterality: Right-handed
- Walk-on music: "Down Under" by Men at Work

Organisation (see split in darts)
- BDO: 2004–2009
- PDC: 2001–2004, 2009–present (Tour Card: 2011–2024)
- WDF: 2002–2008, 2025–
- WSDT: 2025

WDF major events – best performances
- World Championship: Runner-up: 2008
- World Masters: Quarter-final: 2007
- World Trophy: Last 16: 2005, 2006, 2007
- Int. Darts League: Semi-final: 2005, 2006

PDC premier events – best performances
- World Championship: Runner-up: 2010
- World Matchplay: Semi-final: 2010, 2014
- World Grand Prix: Runner-up: 2017
- UK Open: Quarter-final: 2017, 2021
- Grand Slam: Semi-final: 2020
- European Championship: Winner (1): 2012
- Premier League: Runner-up: 2012
- Championship League: Runner-up: 2012
- Desert Classic: Last 32: 2009
- PC Finals: Semi-final: 2012
- Masters: Quarter-final: 2013, 2022
- Champions League: Group Stage: 2018
- World Series Finals: Quarter-final: 2016, 2018

Other tournament wins
- Years
| PDC World Cup of Darts (Team event) | 2022 |
| Australian Grand Masters | 2004, 2005, 2006, 2007 |
| Australian Masters | 2002, 2003, 2006, 2007 |
| Central Coast Classic | 2005, 2008 |
| Gleneagle Irish Masters | 2010 |
| Japan Open | 2006 |
| MODUS Seniors Showdown | 2026 |
| New Zealand Masters | 2005 |
| Oceanic Masters | 2002, 2010 |
| Pacific Masters | 2004, 2006, 2008 |
European Tour Events (x1)
| Dutch Darts Masters | 2012 |
Players Championships (x12)
| 2010 (x6), 2012 (x2), 2014, 2016 (x2), 2017 |
UK Open Qualifiers (x3)
| 2013, 2017 (x2) |
PDC Affiliate Tours (x31)
| ANZ Premier League | 2025 |
| DPA Oceanic Masters (x2) | 2002, 2010 |
| DPA Pro Tour (x28) | 2004 (x2), 2005, 2006 (x3), 2007 (x8), 2009 (x11), 2010 (x3) |

Simon Whitlock (born 3 March 1969) is an Australian professional darts player who competes in Professional Darts Corporation (PDC) events, having previously competed in British Darts Organisation (BDO) and World Seniors Darts (WSD) events.

Nicknamed "the Wizard", he won the 2012 European Championship and the 2022 World Cup of Darts for Australia, partnering Damon Heta. Whitlock is also a two-time World Championship finalist, having been the runner-up at the BDO World Darts Championship in 2008, and the PDC World Darts Championship in 2010. He has won a total of 18 PDC titles and 31 Dartsplayers Australia (DPA) titles. In 2025, he became the inaugural ANZ Premier League champion.

== Early darts career ==
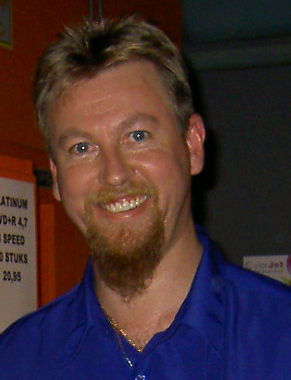
Whitlock in 2006

In 2003, Whitlock reached the last 16 of the World Championship, with wins over Paul Williams and Peter Manley, but lost to Richie Burnett 5–3.

In 2005, Whitlock made the semi-finals of the 2005 BDO World Championship but lost to Martin Adams 5–0. In other major events, he also reached the semi-finals of the International Darts League in both 2005 and 2006, losing to Mervyn King and Raymond van Barneveld respectively.

Whitlock won the first two events in the Dartplayers Australia (DPA) series of tournaments. Whitlock competed in the BDO World Championship, achieving wins over Edwin Max, Fabian Roosenbrand, Ted Hankey, and Brian Woods to reach the final, where he lost to Mark Webster 7–5.

Whitlock entered the 2009 BDO World Darts Championship as the number twelve seed and reached the second round, defeating Mark Barilli, but losing to Darryl Fitton.

== Return to the PDC ==
Whitlock returned to the PDC on 19 March 2009. He began playing in the AGP circuit where he won eight tournaments. He qualified for the Las Vegas Desert Classic but lost in the first round of the televised stages against Terry Jenkins.

At the 2009 Grand Slam of Darts Whitlock won all 3 of his group stage games with wins over Ted Hankey, Wayne Mardle and Scott Waites. In the last 16 he defeated 1996 BDO World Champion Steve Beaton 10–1 but lost to eventual runner up Scott Waites.

At the 2010 PDC World Championship, Whitlock defeated Colin Osborne, Wayne Jones, Terry Jenkins, James Wade, and Raymond van Barneveld before losing to Phil Taylor 7–3.

After his run to the World Championship final, it was announced that he would be competing in the 2010 Premier League Darts as a wild card. He finished second in the table, therefore qualifying for the semi-finals where he lost 8-6 to James Wade.

On his World Matchplay debut in 2010, Whitlock reached the semi-finals before losing to Phil Taylor. At the 2010 Grand Slam of Darts, he lost all three of his group matches against Dave Chisnall, Colin Osborne and Robert Thornton.

Whitlock represented Australia alongside Paul Nicholson during the inaugural PDC World Cup of Darts in December 2010, losing out in the semi-finals to Wales' Mark Webster and Barrie Bates.

=== 2011–2012 ===
At the 2011 PDC World Darts Championship, Whitlock defeated Steve Evans and Denis Ovens before losing to Vincent van der Voort in the third round. He competed in the 2011 Premier League, but finished sixth.

During the 2011 PDC Pro Tour, he became the first player to hit nine-dart finishes in successive Pro Tour events.

At the 2011 World Matchplay, Whitlock defeated Peter Wright and Denis Ovens to reach the quarter-finals. He was defeated by Andy Hamilton 17–15.

Whitlock was forced to withdraw from the 2011 Grand Slam of Darts and 2011 Players Championship Finals through injury. He played at 2012 World Championship where beat Dennis Smith, Steve Beaton, Michael van Gerwen, and Gary Anderson before losing to Andy Hamilton 6–5.

Whitlock partnered Nicholson again at the 2012 PDC World Cup of Darts. Together they achieved victories over Ireland, Belgium and the Netherlands to final, where they played the England's Phil Taylor and Adrian Lewis. Whitlock and Nicholson both missed two darts each to win the match in a sudden death leg.

He was picked for the Premier League. Whitlock won seven of his fourteen league games to finish second in the table, qualifying him for the play-offs. Whitlock played Andy Hamilton in the semi-finals, he hit a nine darter in the second leg of the semi-final, and won the match to reach the final. There he played Phil Taylor and lost 10–7.

Whitlock hit a nine-darter in his second round match at the 2012 Austrian Darts Open (ET1) against Joe Cullen, but lost 6–4.

Whitlock achieved a 6–4 victory over Andy Hamilton in the final of Players Championship 12. At the following week's European Championship, he won his first major title. Whitlock took the title with an 11–5 win over Wes Newton. Whitlock then won his first European Tour title at the 2012 Dutch Darts Masters, defeating his World Cup partner Paul Nicholson 6–1 in the final.

Whitlock lost to Taylor in the final of the 2012 Championship League Darts, 6–5. He then won his second Players Championship of the year with a 6–2 defeat of Dennis Priestley in the final. Whitlock was the second seed for the 2012 Players Championship Finals where he beat Jamie Caven 6–3 in the first round. Whitlock then defeated Ronnie Baxter, and Gary Anderson, but lost to Phil Taylor in the semi-finals 11–2.

=== 2013 ===
Whitlock won his first two matches in the 2013 World Championship without dropping a set and then won a deciding set against Dave Chisnall. However, he lost to Raymond van Barneveld 5–1. In his third World Cup of Darts with Paul Nicholson the pair were defeated 5–1 by Belgium's Ronny Huybrechts and Kim Huybrechts.

He competed in the 2013 Premier League. but finished sixth in the table.

Whitlock won his first tournament of 2013 at the fifth UK Open Qualifier. He beat Michael van Gerwen 6–1 in the final. Van Gerwen beat Whitlock in the final of the 2013 European Darts Open 6–2. Whitlock won the award for televised performance of the year at the PDC Awards Dinner for his quarter-final win over Jamie Caven, but lost to Adrian Lewis 11–6 in the 2013 European Championship final.

=== 2014 ===
Whitlock beat Ian White 5–4 in the quarter-finals of the 2014 PDC World Darts Championship. However, he was defeated by Peter Wright 6–2 in the semi-finals. Whitlock moved up to third in the world rankings after the tournament. Whitlock competed in the Premier League but only won one of his nine matches to be eliminated from the competition. Whitlock and Nicholson reached the semi-finals of the 2014 PDC World Cup of Darts where they faced England's Phil Taylor and Adrian Lewis. Whitlock was beaten 4–1 by Taylor, but Nicholson overcame Lewis 4–2, before Australia lost 4–0 in the doubles decider. Whitlock won Players Championship 12 by beating James Wade 6–3 in the final. He reached the final of the 2014 European Darts Open, but lost 6–2 against Wright.

At the World Matchplay, Whitlock recorded wins over Kevin Painter, Raymond van Barneveld and James Wade to reach the semi-finals of the event for the second time. He was defeated by Michael van Gerwen. He also lost to van Gerwen in the final of the Singapore Darts Masters.

=== 2015 ===
At the 2015 World Championship Whitlock he was beaten 3–1 by Darren Webster in the first round. Whitlock did not receive a wildcard to compete in the Premier League, meaning he missed the event for the first time since 2009.

=== 2016 ===
Whitlock lost to Ricky Evans 3–2 in the first round of the 2016 World Championship. In October, Whitlock won Players Championship 18, defeating Ronny Huybrechts 6–5 in the final.

Whitlock beat Alan Norris in a deciding set at the World Grand Prix. but lost to van Gerwen in the quarter-finals. He defeated Chris Dobey to win his second title of the year at Players Championship 19.

=== 2017 ===
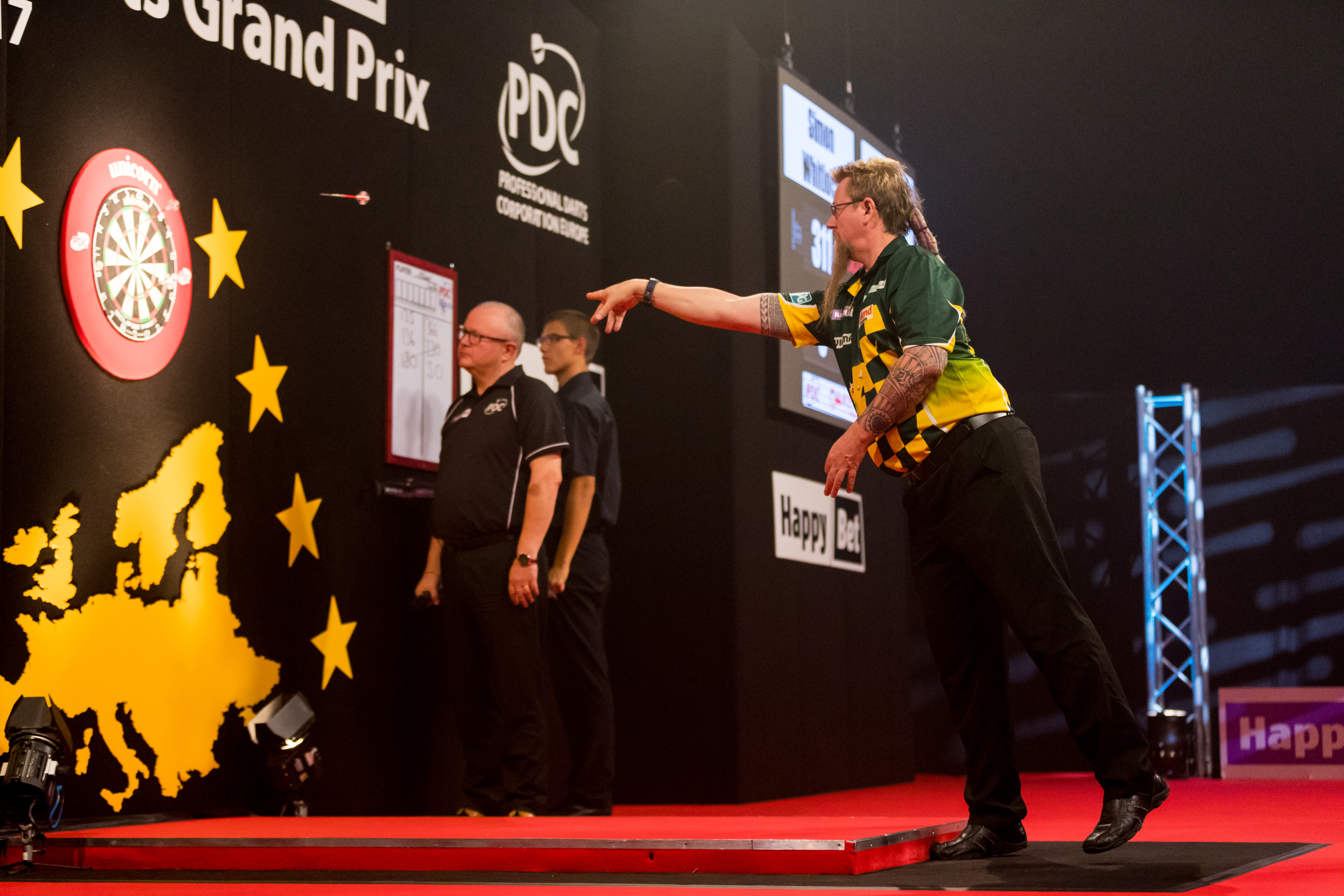
Whitlock in 2017

Whitlock was beaten 4–0 in the second round of the 2017 World Championship by Darren Webster. Whitlock defeated Gary Anderson 6–4 in the final to win UK Open Qualifier 2. He also claimed the fifth event by beating Ronny Huybrechts 6–3. At the main event he was defeated 10–9 by Daryl Gurney in the quarter-finals. He won his third ranking event title of 2017 a week later, winning Players Championship 4.

=== 2020 ===
After a drop in rankings and form over 2019, Whitlock made two televised semi-final appearances in 2020, at the World Grand Prix & Grand Slam, as well as a quarter-final in the World Matchplay. He beat Michael van Gerwen in the quarter-finals at both the Grand Prix and the Slam, defeating van Gerwen 16–15 in a deciding leg at the Grand Slam. Whitlock also hit a Grand Slam record 20 180s in a match during that win against van Gerwen.

=== 2021 ===
Whitlock was eliminated at the third round of the 2021 PDC World Championship to Krzysztof Ratajski 4–0.

Whitlock made it to the quarterfinal stage of the UK Open, where he lost 10–8 to former and eventual winner James Wade.

=== 2022 ===
Whitlock suffered a second round exit at the 2022 PDC World Championship to Dutch player Martijn Kleermaker 3–1.

Whitlock was invited to compete in the 2022 Masters as a replacement player, following Danny Noppert's decision to withdraw from the tournament for personal reasons. He lost a close quarterfinal game to José de Sousa 10–9.

At the 2022 PDC World Cup of Darts in June, Whitlock, alongside Damon Heta, won the tournament for Australia for the very first time, after beating Wales, (Gerwyn Price and Jonny Clayton), in the final 3–1. Both players dedicated there victory to fellow Australian player, Kyle Anderson, who died 10 months prior.

Whitlock also recorded a 6–5 victory over Michael van Gerwen at the 2022 New South Wales Darts Masters.

At the 2022 Grand Slam in November, Whitlock made it out of his group by finishing in second place, but was knocked out of the last 16 to 2012 winner Raymond van Barneveld 10–8.

=== 2023 ===
Whitlock had to start in the first round of the 2023 PDC World Championship after falling out of the top 32 in the PDC Order of Merit. He started off with a 3–2 win over Christian Perez before losing by the same score line in his second round match to José de Sousa despite leading the game 2–0 himself.

At Players Championship 2 in February, Whitlock made his first final since 2017, but lost to Danny Noppert 8–3.

=== 2024 ===
At the 2024 PDC World Championship Whitlock defeated Paolo Nebrida 3–2 in the first round. However, he lost to Gary Anderson 3–0 in the second round.

Whitlock was knocked out in round 4 of the UK Open to his world cup partner Damon Heta 10–8.

Whitlock entered the PDC World Championship Tour Card Holder Qualifiers tournament to try and qualify for the 2025 PDC World Championship, as he was outside the top 32 on both the PDC Order of Merit and Pro Tour Order of Merit. He was knocked out in the last 32 by German player Paul Krohne 6–5. This result also meant that Whitlock lost his Tour Card at the end of 2024.

=== 2025 ===
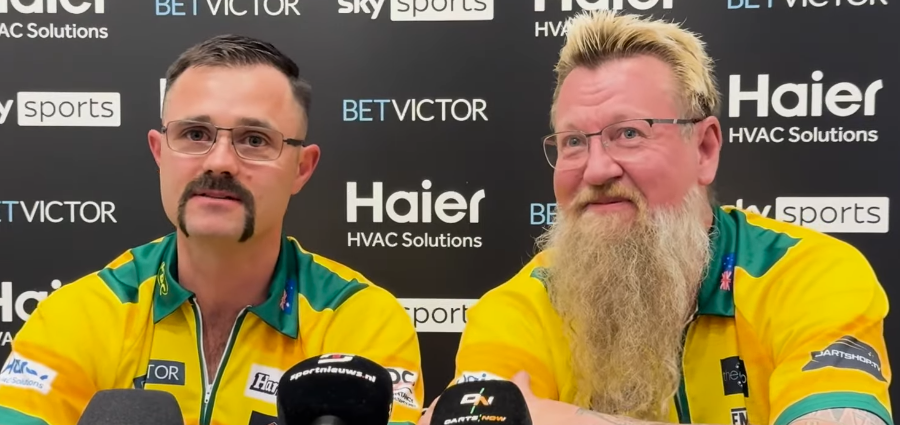
Whtlock (right) and Australian teammate Damon Heta at the 2025 PDC World Cup of Darts

After failing to regain his Tour Card at Q-School, Whitlock accepted an invitation to compete in the 2025 World Seniors Darts Championship. He lost 3–1 in sets to Paul Hogan in round 1. Whitlock also suffered an early exit at the 2025 World Seniors Champion of Champions, after losing to Richie Burnett 5–4. Whitlock again represented Australia at the 2025 PDC World Cup of Darts, alongside Damon Heta, maintaining his ever present record at the tournament. The duo made it to the quarterfinals, where they lost to the German pairing of Martin Schindler and Ricardo Pietreczko in a deciding leg 8–7, despite having match darts themselves to win the match. Whitlock also maintained his ever present records at both the Australian and New Zealand Darts Masters as an invited PDC wildcard entry. He would lose in the first round in both events to Josh Rock and Chris Dobey, and would also lose to Luke Littler in round 1 at the 2025 World Series of Darts Finals 6–4.

Whitlock spent sometime on the 2025 PDC Challenge Tour, where he made it to the quarterfinals in Challenge Tours 1 and 4.

Whitlock also competed in Series 10 Week 2 of the MODUS Super Series in January, where he made it to finals night before being eliminated by the eventual Series 10 winner Jenson Walker in the semi-finals 4–3 in legs. Whitlock would make another appearance in Series 10 at Week 10 in March, where he made it to finals night again but was eliminated from his group after losing both games to David Davies and Jimmy van Schie.

Whitlock was invited to compete in the inaugural ANZ Premier League. He made three finals and qualified for finals night by finishing 3rd in the league table. He defeated New Zealander Jonny Tata 8–3 in their semi-final before going on to beat compatriot Raymond Smith in the final 10–7, to become the inaugural ANZ Premier League champion. The win qualified Whitlock for the 2026 PDC World Championship.

=== 2026 ===
At his Ally Pally return, Whitlock rallied back from 2–0 down in sets to 2–all in his first round clash with Connor Scutt before losing the match 3–2. As a result of not having a Tour Card, Whitlock didn't represent Australia for the very first time at the PDC World Cup of Darts, with his spot being taken over by fellow Aussie player and new Tour Card holder Adam Leek. Whitlock would continue his ever present appearances at both the New Zealand and Australian Darts Masters in 2026. He lost in the first round to Josh Rock and Gerwyn Price and once again lost 6–4 in the first round at 2026 World Series of Darts Finals, this time to Wessel Nijman.

Whitlock is scheduled to defend his ANZ Premier League title in the 2026 edition.

Outside PDC events, Whitlock would win his first MODUS Super Series championship by winning the MODUS Super Series Seniors title in January by beating Steve West in the final 4–0.

At Series 13 Week 6 in February, Whitlock would face his son Mason in Group B. He won the first game against his son 4–1 and 4–0 in the second game, with the latter eliminating Mason from the group altogether. After reaching finals night Simon was eventually eliminated from his group. Whitlock returned for Series 14 Week 3 in May. He again reached finals night after topping his group but failed to reach the semi-finals after losing to Aden Kirk 4–1.

== Personal life ==
Whitlock has three sons from two previous marriages. His son Mason also plays darts. Whitlock is a fan of Portsmouth F.C.

In 2012, Whitlock, together with the seven other players who competed in the Premier League, recorded a charity single with Chas Hodges and his band called 'Got My Tickets for the Darts' which was written by Chas. It was released on 18 May, the night after the play-offs at the O2 in London, where it was premiered. Proceeds from the single were donated to the Haven House Children's Hospice.

== World Championship performances ==
=== BDO ===
- 2005: Semi-finals (lost to Martin Adams 0–5)
- 2006: Second round (lost to Paul Hanvidge 2–4)
- 2007: Second round (lost to Niels de Ruiter 3–4)
- 2008: Runner-up (lost to Mark Webster 5–7)
- 2009: Second round (lost to Darryl Fitton 2–4)

=== PDC ===
- 2003: Third round (lost to Richie Burnett 3–5)
- 2010: Runner-up (lost to Phil Taylor 3–7)
- 2011: Third round (lost to Vincent van der Voort 2–4)
- 2012: Semi-finals (lost to Andy Hamilton 5–6)
- 2013: Quarter-finals (lost to Raymond van Barneveld 1–5)
- 2014: Semi-finals (lost to Peter Wright 2–6)
- 2015: First round (lost to Darren Webster 1–3)
- 2016: First round (lost to Ricky Evans 2–3)
- 2017: Second round (lost to Darren Webster 0–4)
- 2018: Second round (lost to Darren Webster 1–4)
- 2019: Second round (lost to Ryan Joyce 0–3)
- 2020: Fourth round (lost to Gerwyn Price 2–4)
- 2021: Third round (lost to Krzysztof Ratajski 0–4)
- 2022: Second round (lost to Martijn Kleermaker 1–3)
- 2023: Second round (lost to José de Sousa 2–3)
- 2024: Second round (lost to Gary Anderson 0–3)
- 2026: First round (lost to Connor Scutt 2–3)

=== WSD ===
- 2025: First round (lost to Paul Hogan 3–1)

== Career finals ==
=== BDO major finals: 1 ===
| Outcome | No. | Year | Championship | Opponent in the final | Score (Note: (l) = score in legs, (s) = score in sets, (m) = score in matches.) |
|---|---|---|---|---|---|
| Runner-up | 1. | 2008 | World Championship | (Wales) Mark Webster | 5–7 (s) |

=== PDC major finals: 7 (1 title) ===
Legend
World Championship (0–1)
Premier League (0–1)
World Grand Prix (0–1)
European Championship (1–2)
Championship League (0–1)

| Outcome | No. | Year | Championship | Opponent in the final | Score |
|---|---|---|---|---|---|
| Runner-up | 1. | 2010 | World Championship | Phil Taylor | 3–7 (s) |
| Runner-up | 2. | 2012 | Premier League | Phil Taylor | 7–10 (l) |
| Winner | 1. | 2012 | European Championship | Wes Newton | 11–5 (l) |
| Runner-up | 3. | 2012 | Championship League | Phil Taylor | 4–6 (l) |
| Runner-up | 4. | 2013 | European Championship | Adrian Lewis | 6–11 (l) |
| Runner-up | 5. | 2017 | World Grand Prix | Daryl Gurney | 4–5 (s) |
| Runner-up | 6. | 2018 | European Championship (2) | James Wade | 8–11 (l) |

=== PDC world series finals: 1 ===
Legend
World Series of Darts (0–1)

| Outcome | No. | Year | Championship | Opponent in the final | Score |
|---|---|---|---|---|---|
| Runner-up | 1. | 2014 | Singapore Darts Masters | Michael van Gerwen | 8-11 (l) |

=== PDC team finals: 2 (1 title) ===
| Outcome | 'No. | Year | Championship | Team | Teammate | Opponents in the final | Score |
|---|---|---|---|---|---|---|---|
| Runner-up | 1. | 2012 | World Cup of Darts | Australia | Paul Nicholson | England – Phil Taylor and Adrian Lewis | 3–4 (m) |
| Winner | 2. | 2022 | World Cup of Darts | Australia | Damon Heta | Wales – Gerwyn Price and Jonny Clayton | 3–1 (m) |

== Performance timeline ==
Performance Table Legend
| W | Won the tournament | F | Finalist | SF | Semifinalist | QF | Quarterfinalist | #R; RR; Prel. | Lost in # round Round-robin; Preliminary round | DQ | Disqualified |
| DNQ | Did not qualify | DNP | Did not participate | WD | Withdrew | NH | Tournament not held | #R; RR; Prel. | Lost in # round Round-robin; Preliminary round | NYF | Not yet founded |

=== BDO ===
| Tournament | 2003 | 2004 | 2005 | 2006 | 2007 | 2008 | 2009 |
|---|---|---|---|---|---|---|---|
BDO Ranked televised events
| World Championship | DNQ | | SF | 2R | 2R | F | 2R |
| World Masters | DNP | 2R | DNP | | QF | 4R | PDC |
| International Darts League | DNP | | SF | SF | RR | Not held | |
| World Darts Trophy | DNP | | 2R | 2R | 2R | Not held | |

=== WSD ===
| Tournament | 2025 |
|---|---|
World Seniors Televised events
| World Championship | 1R |
| Champion of Champions | 1R |

=== PDC ===
| Tournament | 2003 | 2008 | 2009 | 2010 | 2011 | | 2012 | 2013 | 2014 | 2015 | 2016 | 2017 | 2018 | 2019 | 2020 | 2021 | 2022 | 2023 | 2024 | 2025 | 2026 |
|---|---|---|---|---|---|---|---|---|---|---|---|---|---|---|---|---|---|---|---|---|---|
PDC Ranked televised events
| World Championship | 3R | BDO | | F | 3R | | SF | QF | SF | 1R | 1R | 2R | 2R | 2R | 4R | 3R | 2R | 2R | 2R | DNQ | 1R |
| UK Open | Did not qualify | | | 5R | 3R | | 5R | 3R | 3R | 3R | 4R | QF | 3R | 6R | 5R | QF | 5R | 4R | 4R | DNQ | |
| World Matchplay | DNP | | | SF | QF | | 1R | QF | SF | 2R | 1R | 2R | QF | 2R | QF | Did not qualify | | | | | |
| World Grand Prix | DNP | | | 2R | 2R | | 1R | QF | 1R | 2R | QF | F | 1R | 1R | SF | Did not qualify | | | | | |
| European Championship | DNP | | | 2R | SF | | W | F | 1R | 2R | 1R | QF | F | 2R | DNQ | 1R | Did not qualify | | | | |
| Grand Slam (Note: A non-ranked event until 2015) | NH | QF | QF | RR | WD | | RR | 2R | RR | DNQ | RR | RR | QF | DNQ | SF | DNQ | 2R | Did not qualify | | | |
| Players Championship Finals | Not held | | DNP | | 2R | WD | SF | 1R | 1R | QF | 2R | 2R | 2R | 2R | 2R | 1R | 1R | 1R | DNQ | | |
PDC Non-ranked televised events
| Premier League | NH | DNP | | SF | 6th | | F | 6th | 10th | DNP | | | 8th | Did not participate | | | | | | | |
| Masters (Note: A ranked event from 2025) | Not held | | | | | | | QF | 1R | 1R | DNQ | 1R | 1R | 1R | 1R | 2R | QF | Did not qualify | | | |
| Champions League | Not held | | | | | | | | | | DNQ | | RR | DNQ | Not held | | | | | | |
| World Cup | Not held | | | SF | NH | | F | 2R | SF | QF | QF | 2R | SF | 2R | QF | QF | W | QF | 2R | QF | DNP |
| World Series Finals | Not held | | | | | | | | | 1R | QF | 2R | QF | 1R | 1R | DNQ | 1R | 1R | 1R | 1R | 1R |
PDC Past major events
| Las Vegas Desert Classic | DNP | BDO | 1R | Not held | | | | | | | | | | | | | | | | | |
| Championship League | NH | DNP | | SF | RR | | F | RR | Not held | | | | | | | | | | | | |
Career statistics
| Year-end ranking | 70 | BDO | | 4 | 6 | | 4 | 3 | 7 | 17 | 16 | 8 | 8 | 14 | 18 | 20 | 38 | 44 | 69 | 144 | |

==== European Tour ====
| Season | 1 | 2 | 3 | 4 | 5 | 6 | 7 | 8 | 9 | 10 | 11 | 12 | 13 |
|---|---|---|---|---|---|---|---|---|---|---|---|---|---|
| 2012 | ADO; 2R | GDC; SF | EDO; QF | GDM; QF | DDM; W | | | | | | | | |
| 2013 | UKM; QF | EDT; WD | EDO; F | ADO; WD | GDT; 1R | GDC; 3R | GDM; SF | DDM; SF | | | | | |
| 2014 | GDC; DNP | DDM; 2R | GDM; 3R | ADO; 3R | GDT; SF | EDO; F | EDG; SF | EDT; QF | | | | | |
| 2015 | GDC; 3R | GDT; 3R | GDM; 3R | DDM; 3R | IDO; 2R | EDO; 3R | EDT; 2R | EDM; 2R | EDG; 3R | | | | |
| 2016 | DDM; QF | GDM; DNQ | GDT; 3R | EDM; 2R | ADO; 2R | EDO; 2R | IDO; QF | EDT; 3R | EDG; 2R | GDC; 2R | | | |
| 2017 | GDC; 2R | GDM; SF | GDO; 3R | EDG; 2R | GDT; 3R | EDM; 2R | ADO; 3R | EDO; 2R | DDM; 3R | GDG; SF | IDO; QF | EDT; SF | |
| 2018 | EDO; QF | GDG; 2R | GDO; WD | ADO; 3R | EDG; QF | DDM; 3R | GDT; 3R | DDO; F | EDM; 2R | GDC; 2R | DDC; QF | IDO; F | EDT; 2R |
| 2019 | EDO; 2R | GDC; DNP | GDG; F | GDO; 2R | ADO; DNQ | EDG; DNQ | DDM; 3R | DDO; QF | CDO; SF | ADC; 2R | EDM; 1R | IDO; DNQ | GDT; DNQ |
| 2020 | BDC; DNP | GDC; DNQ | EDG; DNQ | IDO; DNQ | | | | | | | | | |
| 2021 | HDT; 2R | GDT; SF | | | | | | | | | | | |
| 2022 | IDO; 2R | GDC; DNQ | GDG; DNQ | ADO; DNQ | EDO; DNQ | CDO; DNQ | EDG; DNQ | DDC; QF | EDM; DNQ | HDT; 3R | GDO; DNQ | BDO; 1R | GDT; DNQ |
| 2023 | BSD; DNQ | EDO; DNQ | IDO; 1R | GDG; 1R | ADO; 3R | DDC; DNQ | BDO; DNQ | CDO; DNQ | EDG; 1R | EDM; 1R | GDO; 1R | HDT; DNQ | GDC; DNQ |
| 2024 | BDO; DNQ | GDG; DNQ | IDO; 1R | EDG; DNQ | ADO; DNQ | BSD; DNQ | DDC; DNQ | EDO; DNQ | GDC; 2R | FDT; DNQ | HDT; DNQ | SDT; DNQ | CDO; DNQ |

==== Players Championships ====
| Season | 1 | 2 | 3 | 4 | 5 | 6 | 7 | 8 | 9 | 10 | 11 | 12 | 13 | 14 | 15 | 16 | 17 | 18 | 19 | 20 | 21 | 22 | 23 | 24 | 25 | 26 | 27 | 28 | 29 | 30 | 31 | 32 | 33 | 34 | 35 | 36 | 37 |
|---|---|---|---|---|---|---|---|---|---|---|---|---|---|---|---|---|---|---|---|---|---|---|---|---|---|---|---|---|---|---|---|---|---|---|---|---|---|
| 2009 | Did not participate | | | | | | | | | | | | | | | | | | LVE; 5R | SYD; SF | Did not participate | | | | | | | | | | IRV; 2R | IRV; 2R | | | | | |
| 2010 | GIB; DNP | | SWI; 5R | DER; 5R | GLA; DNP | | WIG; 2R | CRA; 3R | BAR; W | DER; W | WIG; 3R | WIG; W | SAL; W | SAL; F | BAR; 2R | WIG; 4R | HAA; 4R | HAA; 4R | HAA; 5R | LVE; F | LVE; QF | SYD; QF | ONT; DNP | | CRA; 4R | CRA; F | NUL; 3R | NUL; SF | DUB; W | DUB; 3R | KIL; 2R | BNA; SF | DER; W | BAR; DNP | | DER; QF | DER; SF |
| 2011 | HAL; SF | HAL; 2R | DER; 2R | DER; 3R | CRA; 3R | DER; 2R | VIE; 5R | VIE; 4R | CRA; SF | CRA; 3R | BAR; 2R | BAR; 4R | NUL; SF | NUL; SF | ONT; 5R | ONT; QF | DER; SF | DER; 3R | NUL; DNP | | DUB; 3R | DUB; 3R | KIL; QF | GLA; QF | GLA; 3R | ALI; QF | Did not participate | | | | | | | | | | |
| 2012 | ALI; 1R | ALI; 3R | REA; SF | REA; 4R | CRA; 1R | CRA; QF | BIR; QF | BIR; F | CRA; QF | CRA; QF | BAR; QF | BAR; W | DUB; 4R | DUB; 3R | KIL; DNP | KIL; 4R | CRA; W | CRA; SF | BAR; 2R | BAR; 4R | | | | | | | | | | | | | | | | | |
| 2013 | WIG; QF | WIG; DNP | | | CRA; 4R | CRA; 1R | BAR; SF | BAR; F | DUB; 3R | DUB; 4R | KIL; DNP | KIL; DNP | WIG; DNP | WIG; DNP | BAR; 1R | BAR; 1R | | | | | | | | | | | | | | | | | | | | | |
| 2014 | BAR; 3R | BAR; 4R | CRA; 3R | CRA; 1R | WIG; 1R | WIG; 3R | WIG; 3R | WIG; SF | CRA; 4R | CRA; 1R | COV; 4R | COV; F | CRA; 2R | CRA; 4R | DUB; 2R | DUB; 4R | CRA; 3R | CRA; 4R | COV; 2R | COV; SF | | | | | | | | | | | | | | | | | |
| 2015 | BAR; 1R | BAR; 3R | BAR; QF | BAR; 3R | BAR; SF | COV; 4R | COV; 1R | COV; 1R | CRA; 4R | CRA; 3R | BAR; 1R | BAR; SF | WIG; 4R | WIG; 2R | BAR; 3R | BAR; SF | DUB; 2R | DUB; 3R | COV; 1R | COV; QF | | | | | | | | | | | | | | | | | |
| 2016 | BAR; 1R | BAR; 3R | BAR; 4R | BAR; 4R | BAR; QF | BAR; QF | BAR; 2R | COV; 4R | COV; 2R | BAR; 1R | BAR; 1R | BAR; 4R | BAR; 3R | BAR; 3R | BAR; 4R | BAR; 4R | DUB; 3R | DUB; W | BAR; W | BAR; 1R | | | | | | | | | | | | | | | | | |
| 2017 | BAR; SF | BAR; 1R | BAR; 1R | BAR; W | MIL; 1R | MIL; QF | BAR; 4R | BAR; 1R | WIG; 1R | WIG; 1R | MIL; QF | MIL; QF | WIG; DNP | | BAR; 2R | BAR; 1R | BAR; 2R | BAR; 3R | DUB; 3R | DUB; 2R | BAR; 1R | BAR; 1R | | | | | | | | | | | | | | | |
| 2018 | BAR; 1R | BAR; 3R | BAR; 1R | BAR; 1R | MIL; 2R | MIL; 2R | BAR; 1R | BAR; SF | WIG; 4R | WIG; 1R | MIL; 3R | MIL; 2R | WIG; 3R | WIG; QF | BAR; 2R | BAR; 1R | BAR; QF | BAR; 2R | DUB; 3R | DUB; 1R | BAR; 2R | BAR; 1R | | | | | | | | | | | | | | | |
| 2019 | WIG; 1R | WIG; 1R | WIG; 1R | WIG; 1R | BAR; DNP | BAR; 3R | WIG; 2R | WIG; 2R | BAR; 1R | BAR; 3R | BAR; 1R | BAR; 4R | BAR; 2R | BAR; 4R | BAR; 3R | BAR; 1R | WIG; 1R | WIG; 2R | BAR; 1R | BAR; 1R | HIL; 4R | HIL; 2R | BAR; 2R | BAR; 3R | BAR; 2R | BAR; 1R | DUB; 3R | DUB; 1R | BAR; 2R | BAR; 4R | | | | | | | |
| 2020 | BAR; 2R | BAR; 1R | WIG; 3R | WIG; 3R | WIG; DNP | WIG; 4R | BAR; 1R | BAR; 2R | MIL; 3R | MIL; 1R | MIL; 1R | MIL; 2R | MIL; 2R | NIE; 4R | NIE; QF | NIE; 2R | NIE; 2R | NIE; QF | COV; 2R | COV; 1R | COV; 4R | COV; 1R | COV; 1R | | | | | | | | | | | | | | |
| 2021 | BOL; 2R | BOL; 2R | BOL; 1R | BOL; 1R | MIL; 1R | MIL; 3R | MIL; 2R | MIL; 1R | NIE; 2R | NIE; 1R | NIE; 3R | NIE; QF | MIL; 1R | MIL; 3R | MIL; 1R | MIL; 1R | COV; 3R | COV; 1R | COV; 1R | COV; 1R | BAR; 2R | BAR; 3R | BAR; 1R | BAR; 2R | BAR; 1R | BAR; 1R | BAR; 1R | BAR; 1R | BAR; 2R | BAR; 4R | | | | | | | |
| 2022 | BAR; 1R | BAR; 1R | WIG; 2R | WIG; 2R | BAR; 3R | BAR; 2R | NIE; 2R | NIE; 3R | BAR; 1R | BAR; 1R | BAR; 1R | BAR; QF | BAR; 1R | WIG; 2R | WIG; 1R | NIE; 2R | NIE; 4R | BAR; 3R | BAR; 2R | BAR; 3R | BAR; 2R | BAR; 1R | BAR; 1R | BAR; 4R | BAR; 1R | BAR; 2R | BAR; 2R | BAR; 3R | BAR; 1R | BAR; 3R | | | | | | | |
| 2023 | BAR; 3R | BAR; F | BAR; 2R | BAR; 4R | BAR; 1R | BAR; 1R | HIL; 1R | HIL; 3R | WIG; 1R | WIG; 1R | LEI; 4R | LEI; 2R | HIL; 1R | HIL; 3R | LEI; 1R | LEI; 2R | HIL; 1R | HIL; 3R | BAR; 1R | BAR; 1R | BAR; 2R | BAR; 1R | BAR; 1R | BAR; 1R | BAR; 2R | BAR; 1R | BAR; 1R | BAR; 1R | BAR; 2R | BAR; 3R | | | | | | | |
| 2024 | WIG; 1R | WIG; 1R | LEI; 3R | LEI; 1R | HIL; 3R | HIL; 2R | LEI; 1R | LEI; 1R | HIL; 1R | HIL; 3R | HIL; 1R | HIL; 1R | MIL; 1R | MIL; 2R | MIL; 1R | MIL; 1R | MIL; 1R | MIL; 1R | MIL; 1R | WIG; 1R | WIG; 1R | MIL; 1R | MIL; 2R | WIG; 1R | WIG; 1R | WIG; 1R | WIG; 2R | WIG; 2R | LEI; 1R | LEI; 1R | | | | | | | |

== Nine-dart finishes ==
Simon Whitlock televised nine-dart finishes
| Date | Opponent | Tournament | Method | Prize |
|---|---|---|---|---|
| 17 May 2012 | (England) Andy Hamilton | Premier League | 3 x T20; 3 x T20; T20, T15, D18 | Unknown |

== High averages ==
Simon Whitlock televised high averages
| Average | Date | Opponent | Tournament | Stage | Score |
|---|---|---|---|---|---|
| 108.86 | 12 November 2018 | (Wales) Gerwyn Price | 2018 Grand Slam | Group stage | 5-4 (l) |

== See also ==
- List of darts players who have switched organisation
