= 2007 International Darts League =

The 2007 Tropicana International Darts League was the fifth and final edition of the International Darts League. It was held at the Triavium in Nijmegen, Netherlands from 4–12 May 2007. The tournament was sponsored by Tropicana — a Dutch-based soft drink manufacturer. Raymond van Barneveld entered the tournament as three-times and defending champion. As in 2006, it was a cross-code event featuring players from both the World Darts Federation and the Professional Darts Corporation.

Darts history was made when the tournament became the first televised event to witness two nine dart finishes. On 8 May Phil Taylor hit his fourth perfect game on television against Raymond van Barneveld and the following night Tony O'Shea matched the effort against Adrian Lewis.

Despite the presence of current BDO and PDC World Champions and four other former world champions in the field, none progressed beyond the quarter-finals. 36 year old Gary Anderson won his first major title with a 13–9 victory over fellow BDO/WDF player Mark Webster.

== Prize fund ==
The total prize fund is €135,000 (plus €26,000 for a nine-dart finish)

Winner €30,000
Runner-up €15,000
Semi-finalists €7,500
Quarter-finalists €4,500
2nd Group stage losers €3,000
1st Group stage losers €2,000
Preliminary round losers €1,000
Nine dart finish An Opel Tigra TwinTop valued at €26,000 – achieved by Phil Taylor on 8 May v Raymond van Barneveld. The sponsors presented Tony O'Shea with the same brand of car later in the tournament for his nine-darter on 9 May, although originally there was only one bonus prize on offer.
Highest checkout €1,000 shared by Phil Taylor 170 & Adrian Lewis

== 2007 controversy ==
The staging of the 2007 IDL was filled with controversy. There were several format changes, disagreements and even court cases surrounding the event.

In 2006 the BDO secured an agreement for 28 of their players to participate in the event until 2010. However, as the popularity of the PDC circuit grew in the Netherlands, the organisers decided to renege on the deal and invite only 12 BDO players. The remaining 20 players would qualify from the PDC including their top 12 ranked players plus four wildcards and four from a PDC/PDPA qualifying event.

This led to a threat from the BDO to take court action against the organisers who wanted their agreement upholding. A compromise was reached and the organisers introduced a preliminary round. The original 16 BDO/WDF players who believed they had missed out were to be joined by a further four automatic qualifiers from the PDC Order of Merit and a further four players from an already confirmed qualifying event in April. This expanded the field from 32 to 56 players.

However the sponsors of the four wildcard players (Michael van Gerwen, Mervyn King, Jelle Klaasen and Vincent van der Voort) were upset that their players had been relegated to the preliminary round when they felt they had an agreement to be automatically into the televised stages. The BDO also felt that all 28 of their players should not have to face a preliminary round. The dispute was resolved on April 25 when a Dutch court rejected the claims of the four wildcard players. Three of the players managed to qualify from the preliminary round with only van der Voort missing out.

== Results ==
=== Preliminary round ===
Played Friday 4 May 2007

Group One – Winner: Mervyn King

Matt Clark 5–4 Albertino Essers
Mervyn King 5–1 Steve Farmer
Steve Farmer 5–4 Albertino Essers
Mervyn King 5–3 Matt Clark
Matt Clark 5–0 Steve Farmer
Mervyn King 5–1 Albertino Essers

Group Two – Winner: Gary Robson

Gary Robson 5–0 Alan Tabern
Edwin Max 5–2 Kevin Painter
Gary Robson 5–1 Edwin Max
Kevin Painter 5–2 Alan Tabern
Alan Tabern 5–3 Edwin Max
Kevin Painter 5–3 Gary Robson

Group Three – Winner: Michael van Gerwen

Brian Sorensen 5–0 Kevin McDine
Michael van Gerwen 5–1 Steve West
Steve West 5–4 Brian Sorensen
Michael van Gerwen 5–3 Kevin McDine
Michael van Gerwen 5–4 Brian Sorensen
Kevin McDine 5–3 Steve West

Group Four – Winner: Ross Montgomery

Ross Montgomery 5–4 Chris Mason
Dirk Hespeels 5–2 Vincent van der Voort
Ross Montgomery 5–4 Dirk Hespeels
Vincent van der Voort 5–3 Chris Mason
Dirk Hespeels 5–0 Chris Mason
Ross Montgomery 5–2 Vincent van der Voort

Group Five – Winner: Barrie Bates

Wayne Jones 5–2 Shane Tichowitsch
Barrie Bates 5–1 Phill Nixon
Phill Nixon 5–4 Shane Tichowitsch
Barrie Bates 5–1 Wayne Jones
Barrie Bates 5–3 Shane Tichowitsch
Phill Nixon 5–4 Wayne Jones

Group Six – Winner: Mark Dudbridge

Mark Dudbridge 5–4 Goran Klemme
Andy Jenkins 5–1 Andy Murray
Andy Jenkins 5–4 Mark Dudbridge
Goran Klemme 5–1 Andy Murray
Goran Klemme 5–4 Andy Jenkins
Mark Dudbridge 5–0 Andy Murray

Group Seven – Winner: Jelle Klaasen

Robbie Green 5–2 Robert Hughes
Jelle Klaasen 5–1 Mark Barilli
Mark Barilli 5–0 Robert Hughes
Jelle Klaasen 5–2 Robbie Green
Jelle Klaasen 5–1 Robert Hughes
Robbie Green 5–2 Mark Barilli

Group Eight – Winner: Ronnie Baxter

Ron Meulenkamp 5–3 Richie Burnett
Ronnie Baxter 5–1 Paul Hogan
Ron Meulenkamp 5–2 Paul Hogan
Richie Burnett 5–4 Ronnie Baxter
Ronnie Baxter 5–2 Ron Meulenkamp
Richie Burnett 5–1 Paul Hogan

=== First round ===
Played Saturday 5 May to Monday 7 May

- Group A

Gary Anderson 6–3 Wayne Mardle
Roland Scholten 6–5 Mervyn King
Gary Anderson 6–2 Roland Scholten
Wayne Mardle 6–5 Mervyn King
Gary Anderson 6–1 Mervyn King
Wayne Mardle 6–2 Roland Scholten

Pos	Name	Wins	Legs won	Legs lost
1	(Scotland) Gary Anderson	3	18	6
2	(England) Wayne Mardle	2	15	13
3	(Netherlands) Roland Scholten	1	10	17
4	(England) Mervyn King	0	11	18

- Group B

Gary Robson 6–3 Simon Whitlock
Peter Manley 6–4 John Part
Simon Whitlock 6–3 Peter Manley
John Part 6-4 Gary Robson
Gary Robson 6–4 Peter Manley
Simon Whitlock 6–5 John Part

Pos	Name	Wins	Legs won	Legs lost
1	(England) Gary Robson	2	16	13
2	(Australia) Simon Whitlock	2	15	14
3	(Canada) John Part	1	15	16
4	(England) Peter Manley	1	13	16

- Group C

Tony Eccles 6–3 Andy Hamilton
Michael van Gerwen 6–4 Terry Jenkins
Tony Eccles 6–4 Terry Jenkins
Michael van Gerwen 6–0 Andy Hamilton
Michael van Gerwen 6–5 Tony Eccles
Andy Hamilton 6–4 Terry Jenkins

Pos	Name	Wins	Legs won	Legs lost
1	(Netherlands) Michael van Gerwen	3	18	9
2	(England) Tony Eccles	2	17	13
3	(England) Andy Hamilton	1	9	16
4	(England) Terry Jenkins	0	12	18

- Group D

Martin Atkins 6–3 Ross Montgomery
Raymond van Barneveld 6–2 Scott Waites
Scott Waites 6–3 Ross Montgomery
Raymond van Barneveld 6–1 Martin Atkins
Raymond van Barneveld 6–2 Ross Montgomery
Scott Waites 6–3 Martin Atkins

Pos	Name	Wins	Legs won	Legs lost
1	(Netherlands) Raymond van Barneveld	3	18	5
2	(England) Scott Waites	2	14	12
3	(England) Martin Atkins	1	10	15
4	(Scotland) Ross Montgomery	0	8	18

- Group E

Adrian Lewis 6–5 Barrie Bates
Martin Adams 6–5 Mario Robbe
Mario Robbe 6–4 Barrie Bates
Adrian Lewis 6–2 Martin Adams
Martin Adams 6–5 Barrie Bates
Adrian Lewis 6–2 Mario Robbe

Pos	Name	Wins	Legs won	Legs lost
1	(England) Adrian Lewis	3	18	9
2	(England) Martin Adams	2	14	16
3	(Wales) Barrie Bates	1	16	16
4	(Netherlands) Mario Robbe	0	11	18

- Group F

Colin Lloyd 6–4 Tony O'Shea
Mark Dudbridge 6–2 Co Stompé
Tony O'Shea 6–4 Mark Dudbridge
Colin Lloyd 6–5 Co Stompé
Mark Dudbridge 6–5 Colin Lloyd
Tony O'Shea 6–2 Co Stompé

Pos	Name	Wins	Legs won	Legs lost
1	(England) Tony O'Shea	2	16	12
2	(England) Mark Dudbridge	2	16	13
3	(England) Colin Lloyd	2	17	15
4	(Netherlands) Co Stompé	0	9	18

- Group G

James Wade 6–5 Darryl Fitton
Jelle Klaasen 6–4 Dennis Priestley
James Wade 6–3 Jelle Klaasen
Darryl Fitton 6–1 Dennis Priestley
Darryl Fitton 6–5 Jelle Klaasen
James Wade 6–4 Dennis Priestley

Pos	Name	Wins	Legs won	Legs lost
1	(England) James Wade	3	18	12
2	(England) Darryl Fitton	2	17	12
3	(Netherlands) Jelle Klaasen	1	14	16
4	(England) Dennis Priestley	0	9	18

- Group H

Mark Webster 6–4 Phil Taylor
Ronnie Baxter 6–1 Niels de Ruiter
Phil Taylor 6–3 Niels de Ruiter
Mark Webster 6–3 Ronnie Baxter
Phil Taylor 6–4 Ronnie Baxter
Mark Webster 6–3 Niels de Ruiter

Pos	Name	Wins	Legs won	Legs lost
1	(Wales) Mark Webster	3	18	10
2	(England) Phil Taylor	2	16	13
3	(England) Ronnie Baxter	1	13	13
4	(Netherlands) Niels de Ruiter	0	7	18

=== Second round ===
Played Tuesday 8 May to Thursday 10 May

- Group I

Gary Anderson 7–1 Martin Adams
Mark Dudbridge 7–6 Gary Robson
Gary Anderson 7–6 Gary Robson
Martin Adams 7–2 Mark Dudbridge
Gary Anderson 7–3 Mark Dudbridge
Gary Robson 7–5 Martin Adams

Pos	Name	Wins	Legs won	Legs lost
1	(Scotland) Gary Anderson	3	21	10
2	(England) Gary Robson	1	19	19
3	(England) Martin Adams	1	13	16
4	(England) Mark Dudbridge	1	12	20

- Group J

Phil Taylor 7–4 Raymond van Barneveld
Darryl Fitton 7–2 Michael van Gerwen
Raymond van Barneveld 7–5 Michael van Gerwen
Darryl Fitton 7–6 Phil Taylor
Michael van Gerwen 7–6 Phil Taylor
Raymond van Barneveld 7–6 Darryl Fitton

Pos	Name	Wins	Legs won	Legs lost
1	(England) Darryl Fitton	2	20	15
2	(Netherlands) Raymond van Barneveld	2	18	18
3	(England) Phil Taylor	1	19	18
4	(Netherlands) Michael van Gerwen	1	14	20

- Group K

Adrian Lewis 7–4 Wayne Mardle
Simon Whitlock 7–6 Tony O'Shea
Tony O'Shea 7–4 Adrian Lewis
Simon Whitlock 7–5 Wayne Mardle
Tony O'Shea 7–5 Wayne Mardle
Adrian Lewis 7–4 Simon Whitlock

Pos	Name	Wins	Legs won	Legs lost
1	(England) Tony O'Shea	2	20	16
2	(England) Adrian Lewis	2	18	15
3	(Australia) Simon Whitlock	2	18	18
4	(England) Wayne Mardle	0	14	21

- Group L

James Wade 7–2 Tony Eccles
Mark Webster 7–6 Scott Waites
Scott Waites 7–3 Tony Eccles
Mark Webster 7–2 James Wade
James Wade 7–4 Scott Waites
Mark Webster 7–4 Tony Eccles

Pos	Name	Wins	Legs won	Legs lost
1	(Wales) Mark Webster	3	21	12
2	(England) James Wade	2	16	13
3	(England) Scott Waites	1	17	17
4	(England) Tony Eccles	0	9	21

=== Knockout stages ===
Quarter-finals; Best of 11 sets best of three legs per set 10 May
WDF	(Scotland) Gary Anderson 107.97	6
PDC	(England) James Wade 106.05	3
PDC	(England) Adrian Lewis 94.23	6
WDF	(England) Darryl Fitton 96.63	2
WDF	(England) Tony O'Shea 96.03	6
PDC	(Netherlands) Raymond van Barneveld 96.36	4
WDF	(Wales) Mark Webster 90.60	6
WDF	(England) Gary Robson 83.37	2

Semi-finals; Best of 17 sets best of three legs per set 11 May
WDF	(Scotland) Gary Anderson 97.47	9
PDC	(England) Adrian Lewis 87.66	1
WDF	(England) Tony O'Shea 84.42	1
WDF	(Wales) Mark Webster 96.84	9

Final; Best of 25 sets best of three legs per set 12 May
WDF	(Scotland) Gary Anderson 95.85	13
WDF	(Wales) Mark Webster 94.54	9

== 2007 format ==
The field was scheduled to contain 56 players with 12 automatically from each organisation going into the group stages. Some players from the BDO withdrew citing the uncertainty over the staging of the event as their reason.

The WDF qualifiers are:-
1. (Scotland) Gary Anderson
2. (England) Martin Adams
3. (England) Tony Eccles
4. (England) Darryl Fitton
5. (Australia) Simon Whitlock
6. (Netherlands) Co Stompé
7. (England) Martin Atkins
8. (Netherlands) Niels de Ruiter
9. (Wales) Mark Webster
10. (England) John Walton (withdrew)
11. (England) Tony O’Shea
12. (England) Ted Hankey (withdrew)

The PDC automatic qualifiers are:-
1. (England) Phil Taylor
2. (Netherlands) Raymond van Barneveld
3. (England) Colin Lloyd
4. (England) Peter Manley
5. (England) Dennis Priestley
6. (England) Terry Jenkins
7. (England) Adrian Lewis
8. (Netherlands) Roland Scholten
9. (England) Wayne Mardle
10. (England) James Wade
11. (Canada) John Part
12. (England) Andy Hamilton

A preliminary round will now consist of:

- The BDO/WDF players ranked 13 to 28 at the cut-off date (Mario Robbe, Scott Waites, Gary Robson, Brian Sørensen, Albertino Essers, Ross Montgomery, Ron Meulenkamp, Shane Tichowitsch, Robert Hughes, Göran Klemme, Steve West, Mark Barilli, Phill Nixon, Steve Farmer, Paul Hogan, Edwin Max) Dirk Hespeels and Andy Murray were added to the field to replace the withdrawn players
- The PDC players ranked 13 to 16 at the cut-off date (Ronnie Baxter, Andy Jenkins, Barrie Bates, Kevin Painter)
- Eight qualifiers from a PDPA qualifying tournament at Villa Park, Birmingham on April 21 (Chris Mason, Wayne Jones, Richie Burnett, Alan Tabern, Mark Dudbridge, Matt Clark, Kevin McDine and Robbie Green)
- Wildcards (Netherlands) Michael van Gerwen, (Netherlands) Jelle Klaasen, (England) Mervyn King and (Netherlands) Vincent van der Voort.

Eight players from the preliminary round will go through to join the 24 automatic qualifiers in the group stages.
