= 2010 in darts =

This article documents all the events in the sport of darts over the course of 2010.

== PDC ==
=== Ladbrokes.com World Darts Championship ===
	Score	
Quarter-Finals (best of 9 sets, 5 legs)
Phil Taylor (England)	5–0	(England) Adrian Lewis
Co Stompé (Netherlands)	3–5	(Wales) Mark Webster
Raymond van Barneveld (Netherlands)	5–0	(England) Ronnie Baxter
Simon Whitlock (Australia)	5–3	(England) James Wade
Semi-Finals (best of 11 sets, 5 legs)
Phil Taylor (England)	6–0	(Wales) Mark Webster
Raymond van Barneveld (Netherlands)	5–6	(Australia) Simon Whitlock
Final (best of 13 sets, 5 legs)
Phil Taylor (England)	7–3	(Australia) Simon Whitlock

=== Coral.co.uk Players Championship ===
	Score	
Quarter-Finals (best of 17 legs)
Phil Taylor (England)	9–7	(England) Colin Lloyd
Paul Nicholson (Australia)	9–7	(England) Adrian Lewis
Wayne Jones (England)	2–9	(England) Mervyn King
Wes Newton (England)	8–9	(England) Colin Osborne
Semi-Finals (best of 19 legs)
Phil Taylor (England)	9–10	(Australia) Paul Nicholson
Mervyn King (England)	10–8	(England) Colin Osborne
Final (best of 25 legs)
Paul Nicholson (Australia)	13–11	(England) Mervyn King

=== Premier League ===
	Score	
Semi finals
Phil Taylor (England)	8–1	(England) Mervyn King
Simon Whitlock (Australia)	6–8	(England) James Wade
Final
Phil Taylor (England)	10–8	(England) James Wade

=== Rileys Dart Zones UK Open ===
	Score	
Quarter-Finals (best of 19 legs)
James Wade (England)	9–10	(England) Tony Ayres
Gary Anderson (Scotland)	10–6	(England) Andy Hamilton
Wes Newton (England)	3–10	(England) Denis Ovens
Phil Taylor (England)	10–2	(England) Adrian Lewis
Semi-Finals (best of 19 legs)
Tony Ayres (England)	3–10	(Scotland) Gary Anderson
Denis Ovens (England)	5–10	(England) Phil Taylor
Final (best of 21 legs)
Gary Anderson (Scotland)	5–11	(England) Phil Taylor

=== Stan James World Matchplay ===
	Score	
Quarter-Finals (best of 31 legs)
Phil Taylor (England)	16–4	(England) Kevin Painter
Jelle Klaasen (Netherlands)	8–16	(Australia) Simon Whitlock
Raymond van Barneveld (Netherlands)	16–12	(Netherlands) Co Stompé
James Wade (England)	16–12	(England) Wayne Jones
Semi-Finals (best of 33 legs)
Phil Taylor (England)	17–4	(Australia) Simon Whitlock
Raymond van Barneveld (Netherlands)	17–8	(England) James Wade
Final (best of 35 legs)
Phil Taylor (England)	18–12	(Netherlands) Raymond van Barneveld

=== PartyPoker.net European Championship ===
	Score	
Quarter-Finals (best of 19 legs)
Phil Taylor (England)	10–4	(England) Mark Walsh
Terry Jenkins (England)	10–6	(England) Jamie Caven
Raymond van Barneveld (Netherlands)	8–10	(England) Wayne Jones
Colin Lloyd (England)	10–7	(England) Ronnie Baxter
Semi-Finals (best of 21 legs)
Phil Taylor (England)	11–10	(England) Terry Jenkins
Wayne Jones (England)	11–10	(England) Colin Lloyd
Final (best of 21 legs)
Phil Taylor (England)	11–1	(England) Wayne Jones

=== Bodog.com World Grand Prix ===
	Score	
Quarter-Finals (best of 7 sets, 5 legs)
Phil Taylor (England)	4–3	(Scotland) Gary Anderson
Adrian Lewis (England)	4–1	(England) Wayne Jones
Raymond van Barneveld (Netherlands)	4–1	(Wales) Barrie Bates
Andy Hamilton (England)	1–4	(England) James Wade
Semi-Finals (best of 9 sets, 5 legs)
Phil Taylor (England)	4–5	(England) Adrian Lewis
Raymond van Barneveld (Netherlands)	1–5	(England) James Wade
Final (best of 11 sets, 5 legs)
Adrian Lewis (England)	3–6	(England) James Wade

=== PDC Pro Tour ===
(All matches – best of 11 legs)

==== Players Championships ====
- Gibraltar, February 6: Colin Lloyd 6–2 Wayne Jones
- Gibraltar, February 7: Denis Ovens 6–5 Gary Anderson
- Swindon, February 20: Mervyn King 6–3 Andy Hamilton
- Derby, February 27: Phil Taylor 6–1 Terry Jenkins
- Gladbeck, Germany, March 6: Vincent van der Voort 6–2 Wayne Jones
- Gladbeck, Germany, March 7: Adrian Lewis 6–4 Mark Walsh
- Wigan, March 13: Phil Taylor 6–0 Mark Dudbridge
- Crawley, March 20: Barrie Bates 6–5 Denis Ovens
- Barnsley, April 10: Simon Whitlock 6–4 Gary Anderson
- Derby, April 17: Simon Whitlock 6–4 Colin Lloyd
- Wigan, April 24: Wes Newton 6–2 Andy Smith
- Wigan, May 8: Simon Whitlock 6–0 Andy Hamilton
- Salzburg, Austria, May 15: Simon Whitlock 6–4 Steve Beaton
- Salzburg, Austria, May 16: Phil Taylor 6–4 Simon Whitlock
- Barnsley, June 12: Gary Anderson 6–1 Mark Walsh
- Barnsley, June 13: Ronnie Baxter 6–5 Denis Ovens
- Haarlem, Netherlands, June 19: Vincent van der Voort 6–5 Wayne Jones
- Haarlem, Netherlands, June 20: Andy Smith 6–4 Alan Tabern
- Las Vegas, Nevada, USA, June 27: Phil Taylor 6–3 Denis Ovens
- Las Vegas, Nevada, USA, June 28: Gary Anderson 6–4 Simon Whitlock
- Las Vegas, Nevada, USA, June 29: Co Stompé 6–3 James Wade
- Revesby, Australia, August 22: Dennis Priestley 6–3 Mark Hylton
- London, Ontario, Canada, August 28: Jamie Caven 6–4 Michael van Gerwen
- London, Ontario, Canada, August 29: Colin Lloyd 6–1 Jamie Caven
- Crawley, September 4: Adrian Lewis 6–4 Steve Farmer
- Crawley, September 5: Colin Lloyd 6–4 Simon Whitlock
- Nuland, Netherlands, September 18: James Wade 6–4 Terry Jenkins
- Nuland, Netherlands, September 19: Steve Farmer 6–4 Kevin Painter
- Dublin, October 2: Simon Whitlock 6–1 Dennis Priestley
- Dublin, October 3: Jamie Caven 6–5 Ronnie Baxter
- Killarney, October 17: Gary Anderson 6–1 Dennis Smith
- Bad Nauheim, October 23: Mark Webster 6–4 Richie Burnett
- Bad Nauheim, October 24: Simon Whitlock 6–4 Richie Burnett
- Barnsley, November 6: Wes Newton 6–3 Colin Lloyd
- Barnsley, November 7: Wes Newton 6–1 Mark Webster
- Derby, November 26: Phil Taylor 6–3 Mark Walsh
- Derby, November 27: Mark Walsh 6–4 Phil Taylor

==== UK Open Regional Finals ====
- Qualifier 1 (Swindon, February 21): Mervyn King 6–1 Simon Whitlock
- Qualifier 2 (Derby, February 8): Mark Walsh 6–2 Phil Taylor
- Qualifier 3 (Wigan, March 14): Phil Taylor 6–0 Jamie Caven
- Qualifier 4 (Crawley, March 21): Gary Anderson 6–5 Wesley Newton
- Qualifier 5 (Barnsley, April 11): Mark Walsh 6–3 John Part
- Qualifier 6 (Derby, April 18): Phil Taylor 6–2 Peter Wright
- Qualifier 7 (Wigan, April 25): Colin Lloyd 6–3 Colin Osborne
- Qualifier 8 (Wigan, May 9): James Wade 6–2 Gary Anderson

==== Other PDC tournaments ====
Date	Event	Venue	Winner	Score	Runner-Up
June 26	World Cricket Championship	Las Vegas	(England) Phil Taylor	3–2	(England) Mark Walsh
June 30	North American Darts Championship	Las Vegas	(Canada) John Part	6–4	(United States) Darin Young
July 24	PDC Women's World Championship	Blackpool	(United States) Stacy Bromberg	6–5	(England) Tricia Wright
August 15	Oceanic Masters	Sydney	(Australia) Simon Whitlock	6–5	(Australia) Shane Tichowitsch
September 12	PDC World Japan Qualifying Event	Yokohama	(Japan) Morihiro Hashimoto	6–0	(Japan) Mitsumasa Hoshino
September 25	South African Masters	Cape Town	(South Africa) Devon Petersen	5–4	(South Africa) Les Francis
October 10	Tom Kirby Memorial Irish Matchplay	Dublin	(Northern Ireland) Michael Mansell	6–4	(Republic of Ireland) Stephen Byrne
October 16	Gleneagle Irish Masters	Killarney	(Australia) Simon Whitlock	6–4	(England) Phil Taylor
October 30	PDC World East European Qualifying Event	Eisenstadt	(Austria) Dietmar Burger	6–2	(Austria) Christian Kallinger
November 6	PDC World South European Qualifying Event	Ptuj	(Croatia) Boris Krcmar	6–4	(Croatia) Zdravko Antunovic
November 20	PDC World West European Qualifying Event	Ávila, Spain	(Netherlands) Roland Scholten	6–4	(Spain) Armando Jimenez
November 28	PDC World Russia Qualifying Event	Moscow	(Russia) Andrej Rashnikov	8–1	(Russia) Anastasia Dobromyslova
November 28	PDC World Greater China Qualifying Event	Hong Kong	(Hong Kong) Scott MacKenzie	beat	(Hong Kong) Alex Hon
November 29	PDC World Darts Championship PDPA Qualifier	Derby	(England) Alex Roy	5–1	(England) Matt Padgett
December 5	PDC World Cup of Darts	Houghton-le-Spring	(Netherlands) Netherlands; Raymond van Barneveld; Co Stompé	4–2	(Wales) Wales; Mark Webster; Barrie Bates

== BDO/WDF ==
=== Lakeside World Darts Championship ===
	Score	
Quarter-Finals (best of 9 sets, 5 legs)
Tony O'Shea (England)	5–1	(Norway) Robert Wagner
Ted Hankey (England)	4–5	(England) Dave Chisnall
Scott Waites (England)	4–5	(Wales) Martin Phillips
Garry Thompson (England)	2–5	(England) Martin Adams
Semi-Finals (best of 11 sets, 5 legs)
Tony O'Shea (England)	3–6	(England) Dave Chisnall
Martin Phillips (Wales)	4–6	(England) Martin Adams
Final (best of 13 sets, 5 legs)
Dave Chisnall (England)	5–7	(England) Martin Adams

=== WDF Europe Cup ===
	Score	
Quarter-Finals (best of 9 legs)
Scott Waites (England)	3–5	(Scotland) Mike Veitch
Martin McCloskey (Republic of Ireland)	1–5	(Netherlands) Willy van de Wiel
Martin Adams (England)	4–5	(Wales) Martin Phillips
Wayne Warren (Wales)	5–0	(Finland) Jaakko Kiiski
Semi-Finals (best of 11 legs)
Mike Veitch (Scotland)	3–6	(Netherlands) Willy van de Wiel
Martin Phillips (Wales)	6–1	(Wales) Wayne Warren
Final (best of 13 legs)
Willy van de Wiel (Netherlands)	3–7	(Wales) Martin Phillips

=== Winmau World Masters ===
	Score	
Quarter-Finals (best of 5 sets, 3 legs)
Martin Adams (England)	3–1	(England) Scott Waites
Martin McCloskey (Republic of Ireland)	3–0	(England) Dean Winstanley
Stuart Kellett (England)	3–2	(England) Ted Hankey
Martin Phillips (Wales)	3–1	(England) Ian Jones
Semi-Finals (best of 11 sets, 3 legs)
Martin Adams (England)	6–3	(Republic of Ireland) Martin McCloskey
Stuart Kellett (England)	6–5	(Wales) Martin Phillips
Final (best of 13 sets, 3 legs)
Martin Adams (England)	7–3	(England) Stuart Kellett

=== WDF Category 1 Events ===
- Dutch Open at NH Hotel/Congress centre, Veldhoven, February 7

Quarter-Finals (Losers €500, Best of 7 legs) Ross Montgomery 4–0 Patrick Loos, Scott Waites 4–1 Paul Gibbs, Steve Douglas 4–1 Edwin Max, Martin Adams 4–1 Steve West
Semi-Finals (Losers €1,250, Best of 3 sets, 5 legs per set) Scott Waites 4–0 Ross Montgomery, Martin Adams 2–0 Steve Douglas
Final (Winner €4,500 Runner-up €2,250, Best of 5 sets, 5 legs per set) Martin Adams 3–1 Scott Waites

- Scottish Open at Normandy Cosmopolitan Hotel, Renfrew, February 21

Quarter-Finals (Losers £100, Best of 7 legs) Stuart Kellett 4–1 Ian Lilley, Remco van Eijden 4–2 Gary Robson, Jamie Lewis 4–0 Paul Telford, Dennis te Kloese 4–2 Garry Thompson
Semi-Finals (Losers £300, Best of 9 legs) Stuart Kellett 5–2 Remco van Eijden, Dennis te Kloese 5–1 Jamie Lewis
Final (Winner £2,000 Runner-up £800, Best of 11 legs) Stuart Kellett 6–3 Dennis te Kloese

- German Open in Bochum, April 17. Matches played in sets, three legs per set.

Quarter-Finals (Losers €240) Ross Smith 2–1 Joey ten Berge, Ronny Huybrechts 2–1 Rob Radsma, Gary Robson 2–0 Fabian Roosenbrand, Dean Winstanley 2–1 Jan Dekker
Semi-Finals (Losers €480) Ronny Huybrechts 2–0 Ross Smith, Dean Winstanley 2–1 Gary Robson
Final (Winner €2,400 Runner-up €1,200) Dean Winstanley 3–2 Ronny Huybrechts

- British Open at The Spa, Bridlington, September 18

Quarter-Finals (Losers £150, Best of 5 legs) Paul Harvey 3–1 Barry Davies, Andrew Gilding 3–0 Scott Waites, Ted Hankey 3–1 Andy Beardmore, Ian Jones 3–0 Kevin Harris
Semi-Finals (Losers £400, Best of 3 sets, 5 legs per set) Andrew Gilding 2–0 Paul Harvey, Ted Hankey 2–1 Ian Jones
Final (Winner £3,000 Runner-up £1,000, Best of 5 sets, 5 legs per set) Ted Hankey 3–0 Andrew Gilding

=== WDF Category 2 Events ===
- German Gold Cup, January 24 (Winner €800, Runner-up €400) Vladimir Andersen (Denmark) 3–1 (Germany) Tobias Muller
- Isle of Man Open, March 14 (Winner £5,000, Runner-up £1,500) Dave Prins (England) 3–0 (Netherlands) Joey ten Berge
- Mariflex Open, March 21 (Winner €2,500, Runner-up €1,000) John Henderson (Scotland) 3–2 (England) Steve West
- Virginia Beach Dart Classic, March 28 (Winner $1,200, Runner-up $600) Jerry van Loan (United States) beat (United States) Jim Widmayer
- Antwerp Open, April 4 (Winner €2,500, Runner-up €1,000) Stuart Kellett (England) 3–2 (Netherlands) Gino Vos
- Dortmund Open, May 16 Robert Wagner (Norway) beat (Belgium) Davyd Venken
- BDO International Open, June 13 (Winner £3,000, Runner-up £700) Martin Adams (England) 4–1 (England) Gary Robson
- Canadian Open, June 20 (Winner C$1,000, Runner-up C$500) Terry Hayhurst (Canada) 5–3 (Canada) Troy Hanlon
- New Zealand Masters, June 20 Peter Hunt 5–3 Bernie Smith
- England Open, June 27 (Winner £3,000, Runner-up £1,000) Dean Winstanley 5–2 (Scotland) Mark Harris
- England Masters, July 18 (Winner £1,200, Runner-up £600) John Walton 5–3 Dean Winstanley
- British Classic, July 24 (Winner £3,000, Runner-up £500) Ross Montgomery (Scotland) 2–0 (England) Stuart Kellett
- Pacific Masters, July 24 (Winner A$1,100, Runner-up A$600) Beau Anderson (Australia) 6–4 (Australia) Bill Stanley
- New Zealand Open, August 4 (Winner NZ$1,500, Runner-up NZ$700) Peter Hunt 5–0 Sonny Harris
- Belgium Open, August 8 (Winner €2,500, Runner-up €1,200) Dean Winstanley (England) 3–2 (England) Tony O'Shea
- WDF Americas Cup Singles, August 24 Chuck Pankow (United States) 4–3 (United States) Gary Mawson
- England Classic, September 26 (Winner £2,500, Runner-up £1,000) Stephen Bunting 6–0 Tony West
- Japan Open, October 17 (Winner ¥70,000, Runner-up ¥30,000) Katsuya Aiba beat Yuichi Okiyama
- Northern Ireland Open, November 6 (Winner £1,600, Runner-up £750) Robbie Green (England) 3–0 (Scotland) Ewan Hyslop
- WDF Asia-Pacific Cup Singles, November 6 Koha Kokiri (New Zealand) 4–1 (Japan) Morihiro Hashimoto
- Czech Open, November 7 Scott Waites (England) 6–2 (England) Dean Winstanley
- Flanders Open, November 14 (Winner €2,500, Runner-up €1,000) Fabian Roosenbrand (Netherlands) beat (Belgium) Kim Huybrechts
