= 2007 WDF World Cup =

International darts competition

The 2007 WDF World Cup was the 16th edition of the WDF World Cup darts tournament, organised by the World Darts Federation. It was held in Rosmalen, Netherlands from October 11 to 14. This event was televised by Eurosport

== Men's singles ==
=== Preliminary round ===
- (Barbados) Anthony Forde 2 – 4 Mario Robbe (Netherlands)
- (Barbados) Mark Cummins 3 – 4 Connie Finnan (Republic of Ireland)
- (Barbados) Sylvan Jones 3 – 4 Preben Krabben (Denmark)
- (Barbados) Clyde Murrell 2 – 4 Geert de Vos (Belgium)
- (Australia) Ian Brown 4 – 0 Robert Calupit (Philippines)
- (Trinidad and Tobago) Kevin Jacob 4 – 3 Lourence Ilagan (Philippines)
- (Isle of Man) Wayne Harrison 4 – 0 Rizal Barellano (Philippines)
- (Philippines) Ronald Briones 3 – 4 Co Stompe (Netherlands)

=== Knockout stage ===
Second Round
(Netherlands)	Mario Robbe	4
(Malaysia)	Keshminder Singh	0
(Norway)	Jacques Langston	0
(Gibraltar)	Dyson Parody	4
(Australia)	Ian Brown	4
(Hungary)	Nándor Bezzeg	2
(France)	Cyril Blot	0
(Finland)	Vesa Nuutinen	4
(Greece)	Kostas Pantelidis	4
(Trinidad and Tobago)	Kevin Jacob	0
(Canada)	Ken MacNeil	4
(Spain)	Tony Martinez	1
(Republic of Ireland)	Aodhagan O'Neill	3
(Wales)	Martin Phillips	4
(Latvia)	Arnis Vents	3
(England)	Steve Farmer	4
(Finland)	Marko Kantele	4
(Isle of Man)	Wayne Harrison	2
(Belgium)	Patrick Bulen	3
(Malaysia)	Selbaraju Subramaniam	4
(Germany)	Karsten Koch	4
(Scotland)	Paul McGimpsey	1
(Trinidad and Tobago)	Vivekanand Dyal	1
(Sweden)	Magnus Caris	4
(Netherlands)	Co Stompé	4
(Norway)	Oyvind Aasland	0
(Wales)	Mark Webster	4
(England)	John Walton	1
(Greece)	John Michael	4
(Brazil)	Anderson Vieira	0
(Australia)	Kyle Anderson	4
(United States)	Gary Mawson	1
(England)	Martin Adams	4
(Australia)	Brad Austen	0
(Spain)	Leonard Pitman	2
(Netherlands)	Joey ten Berge	4
(Malaysia)	Jasvender Singh	0
(Norway)	Robert Wagner	4
(Germany)	Michael Rosenauer	4
(Belgium)	Ronny Huybrechts	0
(Finland)	Asko Niskala	2
(Denmark)	Preben Krabben	4
(Japan)	Nozomu Kinoshita	1
(Republic of Ireland)	Connie Finnan	4
(The Bahamas)	Harry Brown	3
(South Africa)	Christo Meiring	4
(Wales)	Robert Hughes	4
(Sweden)	Daniel Larsson	0
(South Africa)	Clifford Stradling	1
(Sweden)	Markus Korhonen	4
(England)	Tony O'Shea	3
(Norway)	Rune David	4
(Canada)	Wayne Pike	3
(Latvia)	Zanis Buklovskis	4
(Republic of Ireland)	Anto McCracken	1
(Scotland)	Paul Hanvidge	4
(Japan)	Taro Yachi	3
(Wales)	Wayne Warren	4
(Australia)	Tony David	4
(Bermuda)	John Almeida	0
(Hungary)	Romeo Gyalai	4
(Malaysia)	Amin Abdul Ghani	0
(Belgium)	Geert De Vos	4
(Denmark)	Per Laursen	1

Third round
(Netherlands)	Mario Robbe	4
(Gibraltar)	Dyson Parody	3
(Australia)	Ian Brown	0
(Finland)	Vesa Nuutinen	4
(Greece)	Kostas Pantelidis	4
(Canada)	Ken MacNeil	0
(Wales)	Martin Phillips	0
(England)	Steve Farmer	4
(Finland)	Marko Kantele	4
(Malaysia)	Selbaraju Subramaniam	3
(Germany)	Karsten Koch	4
(Sweden)	Magnus Caris	2
(Netherlands)	Co Stompé	3
(Wales)	Mark Webster	4
(Greece)	John Michael	4
(Australia)	Kyle Anderson	0
(England)	Martin Adams	4
(Netherlands)	Joey ten Berge	1
(Norway)	Robert Wagner	4
(Germany)	Michael Rosenauer	2
(Denmark)	Preben Krabben	2
(Republic of Ireland)	Connie Finnan	4
(South Africa)	Christo Meiring	2
(Wales)	Robert Hughes	4
(Sweden)	Markus Korhonen	1
(Norway)	Rune David	4
(Latvia)	Zanis Buklovskis	1
(Scotland)	Paul Hanvidge	4
(Wales)	Wayne Warren	4
(Australia)	Tony David	2
(Hungary)	Romeo Gyalai	2
(Belgium)	Geert De Vos	4

Fourth round
(Netherlands)	Mario Robbe	4
(Finland)	Vesa Nuutinen	1
(Greece)	Kostas Pantelidis	2
(England)	Steve Farmer	4
(Finland)	Marko Kantele	4
(Germany)	Karsten Koch	2
(Wales)	Mark Webster	4
(Greece)	John Michael	2
(England)	Martin Adams	3
(Norway)	Robert Wagner	4
(Republic of Ireland)	Connie Finnan	4
(Wales)	Robert Hughes	1
(Norway)	Rune David	3
(Scotland)	Paul Hanvidge	4
(Wales)	Wayne Warren	0
(Belgium)	Geert De Vos	4

Quarter-finals
(Netherlands)	Mario Robbe	4
(England)	Steve Farmer	1
(Finland)	Marko Kantele	0
(Wales)	Mark Webster	4
(Norway)	Robert Wagner	4
(Republic of Ireland)	Connie Finnan	3
(Scotland)	Paul Hanvidge	2
(Belgium)	Geert De Vos	4

Semi-finals
(Netherlands)	Mario Robbe	1
(Wales)	Mark Webster	4
(Norway)	Robert Wagner	4
(Belgium)	Geert De Vos	1

Final
(Wales)	Mark Webster	4
(Norway)	Robert Wagner	0

== Women's singles ==
Quarter-finals
(Sweden)	Maud Jansson	3
(Wales)	Julie Gore	4
(Japan)	Yukari Nishikawa	4
(United States)	Stacy Bromberg	3
(South Africa)	Crystal Spannenberg	3
(Scotland)	Frances Lawson	4
(Wales)	Jan Robbins	4
(Germany)	Bianka Strauch	2

Semi-finals
(Wales)	Julie Gore	4
(Japan)	Yukari Nishikawa	1
(Scotland)	Frances Lawson	3
(Wales)	Jan Robbins	4

Final
(Wales)	Julie Gore	2
(Wales)	Jan Robbins	4

== Other winners ==
Event	Winner	Score	Runner-up
Men's Team	(England) Martin Adams; Steve Farmer; Tony O'Shea; John Walton	9–8	(Netherlands) Joey ten Berge; Mario Robbe; Niels de Ruiter; Co Stompé
Men's Pairs	(Netherlands) Mario Robbe; Joey ten Berge	4–2	(Finland) Marko Kantele; Asko Niskala
Women's Pairs	(Russia) Anastasia Dobromyslova; Irina Armstrong	4–2	(Sweden) Maud Jansson; Carina Ekberg
Youth Singles - Boys	(Hungary) Tibor Tax	3–1	(Netherlands) Maarten Pape
Youth Singles - Girls	(Sweden) Linda Odén	3–0	(England) Harriet Wolton
Youth Pairs	(Netherlands) Maarten Pape; Thea Kaaijk	3–0	(Australia) Mitchell Clegg; Brie Peters

== Final points tables ==
=== Men ===
Ranking	Team	Points
1	Netherlands	108
2	England	103
3	Wales	82
4	Finland	56
5	Norway	46

=== Women ===
Ranking	Team	Points
1	Wales	47
2	Russia	35
3	Sweden	31
4	United States	26
5	Scotland	21

=== Youth ===
Ranking	Team	Points
1	Netherlands	67
2	England	48
3	Australia	46
4	Sweden	43
5	Hungary	34
