= 2009 Zuiderduin Masters =

Zuiderduin Masters

Tournament information
- Dates: 11 December 2009 – 13 December 2009
- Venue: Hotel Zuiderduin
- Location: Egmond aan Zee
- Country: North Holland, the Netherlands
- Organisation(s): BDO / WDF
- Format: Legs (group stage); Sets (from Quarter-finals); Final – best of 9 Sets

Champion(s)
- (England) Darryl Fitton

The 2009 Zuiderduin Masters was a British Darts Organisation darts tournament that took place on 11–13 December in Egmond aan Zee, Netherlands. It was the 11th staging of the event, and the last tournament to be staged that year.

The competition saw Darryl Fitton hit a nine-dart finish during his quarter-final match against Ross Montgomery, becoming the first player to achieve the feat in the Zuiderduin's history. Fitton went on to win the tournament, with a 4 sets to 2 win over Martin Adams in the final, becoming the third Englishman to claim the title. The women's event was won by Wales' Julie Gore, who triumphed against Tricia Wright 2 sets to 0. Gore's three dart average of 86.07 was the highest recognized average for a ladies player in a BDO major, since Anastasia Dobromyslova's 81.54 average in the 2008 World Championship.

== Results ==
=== Men's tournament ===
==== Group stage ====
all matches best of 9 legs.
P = Played; W = Won; L = Lost; LF = Legs for; LA = Legs against; +/- = Leg difference; Pts = Points

Group A

Pos	Name	P	W	L	LF	LA	+/-	Pts
1	(England) Martin Atkins	2	2	0	10	7	+3	4
2	(Scotland) Mark Barilli	2	1	1	8	9	-1	2
3	(England) Tony O'Shea (1)	2	0	2	8	10	-2	0

Mark Barilli 78.03 3-5 Martin Atkins 79.47
Tony O'Shea 85.83 4-5 Mark Barilli 87.39
Tony O'Shea 93.36 4-5 Martin Atkins 88.23

Group B

Pos	Name	P	W	L	LF	LA	+/-	Pts
1	(England) Alan Norris (8)	2	2	0	10	7	+3	4
2	(Scotland) John Henderson	2	1	1	9	7	+2	2
3	(England) Ian White	2	0	2	5	10	-5	0

John Henderson 101.91 5-2 Ian White 84.75
Alan Norris 90.75 5-3 Ian White 83.19
Alan Norris 84.78 5-4 John Henderson 76.62

Group C

Pos	Name	P	W	L	LF	LA	+/-	Pts
1	(Scotland) Ross Montgomery	2	2	0	10	7	+3	4
2	(England) Ted Hankey (5)	2	1	1	9	9	0	2
3	(Netherlands) Henny van der Ster	2	0	2	7	10	-3	0

Ross Montgomery 91.29 5-4 Henny van der Ster 84.12
Ted Hankey 86.97 5-1 Henny van der Ster 74.70
Ted Hankey 90.18 3-5 Ross Montgomery 83.64

Group D

Pos	Name	P	W	L	LF	LA	+/-	Pts
1	(England) Darryl Fitton (4)	2	2	0	10	7	+3	4
2	(England) Dave Prins	2	1	1	9	9	0	2
3	(Netherlands) Willy van de Wiel	2	0	2	7	10	-3	0

Dave Prins 85.71 5-4 Willy van de Wiel 85.23
Darryl Fitton 98.49 5-3 Willy van de Wiel 83.85
Darryl Fitton 89.40 5-4 Dave Prins 76.26

Group E

Pos	Name	P	W	L	LF	LA	+/-	Pts
1	(England) Martin Adams (3)	2	2	0	10	2	+8	4
2	(Norway) Robert Wagner	2	1	1	6	8	-2	2
3	(Netherlands) Mareno Michels	2	0	2	4	10	-6	0

Robert Wagner 88.89 5-3 Mareno Michels 78.57
Martin Adams 104.46 5-1 Mareno Michels 88.56
Martin Adams 98.28 5-1 Robert Wagner 86.61

Group F

Pos	Name	P	W	L	LF	LA	+/-	Pts
1	(England) Steve West (6)	2	2	0	10	6	+4	4
2	(Netherlands) Gino Vos	2	1	1	8	8	0	2
3	(Netherlands) Joey ten Berge	2	0	2	6	10	-4	0

Gino Vos 85.50 5-3 Joey ten Berge 85.32
Steve West 89.19 5-3 Joey ten Berge 91.08
Steve West 88.38 5-3 Gino Vos 92.67

Group G

Pos	Name	P	W	L	LF	LA	+/-	Pts
1	(England) Gary Robson	2	2	0	10	4	+6	4
2	(England) John Walton (7)	2	1	1	9	6	+3	2
3	(Netherlands) Ron Meulenkamp	2	0	2	1	10	-9	0

Ron Meulenkamp 76.59 0-5 Gary Robson 84.45
John Walton 82.77 5-1 Ron Meulenkamp 86.49
John Walton 85.71 4-5 Gary Robson 85.47

Group H

Pos	Name	P	W	L	LF	LA	+/-	Pts
1	(England) Scott Waites (2)	2	2	0	10	6	+4	4
2	(England) Tony West	2	1	1	7	9	-2	2
3	(England) Brian Woods	2	0	2	8	10	-2	0

Brian Woods 88.56 4-5 Tony West 82.62
Scott Waites 92.49 5-4 Brian Woods 84.81
Scott Waites 94.92 5-2 Tony West 79.47

==== Knockout stages ====
Quarter-finals; Best of 5 sets
(England) Martin Atkins 85.89	1
8	(England) Alan Norris 82.32	3
(Scotland) Ross Montgomery 93.57	1
4	(England) Darryl Fitton 100.32	3
3	(England) Martin Adams 93.33	3
6	(England) Steve West 77.10	1
(England) Gary Robson 97.30	3
2	(England) Scott Waites 96.94	2

Semi-finals; Best of 5 sets
8	(England) Alan Norris 92.88	0
4	(England) Darryl Fitton 103.47	3
3	(England) Martin Adams 100.47	3
(England) Gary Robson 87.01	1

Final; Best of 7 sets
4	(England) Darryl Fitton 93.94	4
2	(England) Martin Adams 97.00	2

=== Women's tournament ===
Quarter-finals; Best of 7 legs
1	(Russia) Irina Armstrong 68.19	4
(Netherlands) Francis Hoenselaar 61.77	2
4	(Wales) Julie Gore 68.64	4
(Netherlands) Daisy van Driel 68.22	2
3	(England) Tricia Wright 77.79	4
(Netherlands) Floortje van Zanten 69.18	2
2	(England) Trina Gulliver 75.87	4
(Netherlands) Carla Molema 68.01	2

Semi-finals; Best of 9 legs
1	(Russia) Irina Armstrong 67.41	3
4	(Wales) Julie Gore 69.03	5
3	(England) Tricia Wright 79.83	5
2	(England) Trina Gulliver 79.26	2

Final; Best of 3 sets
4	(Wales) Julie Gore 86.07	2
3	(England) Tricia Wright 81.87	0
