= Las Vegas Open (darts) =

Tournament information
- Venue: Tuscany Suites and Casino
- Location: Paradise, Nevada, United States
- Established: 1978 (43rd edition)
- Organisation(s): American Darts Organization (ADO); BDO, category C World Darts Federation (WDF), Gold category (since 2024)
- Format: Legs
- Prize fund: $11,560
- Month(s) Played: January

Current champion(s)
- Jason Brandon (USA) (open); Deta Hedman (ENG) (women's)

The Las Vegas Open is a darts tournament organised by the American Darts Organization that started in 1978.

== List of winners ==
=== Men's ===
Year	Champion	Score	Runner-up	Total Prize Money	Champion	Runner-up
1978	(United States) Conrad Daniels	beat	(United States) Dan Pucillo			
1979	(United States) Dan Pucillo	beat	(United States) Len Heard			
1980	(United States) John Kramer	beat	(United States) Conrad Daniels			
1981	(United States) Len Heard	beat	(United States) Andy Green			
1982	(United States) Jerry Umberger	beat	(Singapore) Paul Lim			
1983	(United States) Dick McGinnis	beat	(Canada) Tony Holyoake			
1984	(United States) Rick Ney	beat	(United States) Nicky Virachkul			
1985	(United States) Tony Payne	beat	(United States) Dan Valletto			
1986	(Canada) Bob Sinnaeve	beat	(United States) Nicky Virachkul			
1987	(United States) Gerald Verrier	beat	(England) Eric Bristow			
1988	(United States) Nicky Virachkul	beat	(England) Bob Anderson			
1989	(Canada) Bob Sinnaeve	3–1	(United States) Nicky Virachkul			
1990	(England) Eric Bristow	beat	(Canada) Bob Sinnaeve			
1991	(United States) Sean Downs	beat	(United States) Len Heard			
1992	(United States) Larry Butler	beat	(United States) Steve Brown			
1993	(Canada) Albert Anstey	beat	(United States) Jim Watkins			
1994	(United States) Dave Kelly	beat	(United States) John Gray			
1995	(Canada) Tony Holyoake	beat	(United States) Paul Lim			
1996	(United States) Gary Mawson	beat	(England) Nigel Justice			
1997	(Canada) Avtar Gill	beat	(United States) Gerome Vardaro			
1998	(Canada) John Part	beat	(England) John Lowe			
1999	(United States) John Gray	beat	(United States) Al Dorn			
2000	(United States) Mark Goodwin	beat	(United States) Jon Dilley			
2001	(United States) Steve Brown	beat	(United States) Roger Carter			
2002	(England) Mick Manning	beat	(United States) Chris White			
2003	(United States) Bill Davis	beat	(United States) Ray Carver			
2004	(Canada) Dan Olson	beat	(United States) Ricky Villanueva			
2005	(United States) Davis Snider	beat	(United States) John Kuczynski			
2006	(United States) Darin Young	beat	(United States) Davis Snider			
2007	(United States) Chris White	beat	(United States) John Kuczynski	$2,560	$800	$400
2008	(United States) Darin Young (2)	4–2	(United States) Jerry Hilbourn	$2,560	$800	$400
2009	(England) Wes Newton	beat	(United States) Brian Blake	$2,560	$800	$400
2010	(United States) Bill Davis (2)	beat	(Hong Kong) Royden Lam	$2,560	$800	$400
2011	(United States) Larry Butler (2)	beat	(United States) Gordon Dixon	$2,560	$800	$400
2012	(United States) Howard Meyers	beat	(United States) Timmy Bagley	$2,560	$800	$400
2013	(United States) Gary Mawson (2)	beat	(England) Wes Newton	$3,460	$1,000	$500
2014	(Wales) Richie Burnett	beat	(United States) Joe Huffman	$3,460	$1,000	$500
2015	(Canada) Jeff Smith	beat	(United States) Darin Young	$3,460	$1,000	$500
2016	(United States) Benjamin Dersch	beat	(Canada) Ross Snook	$3,460	$1,000	$500
2017	(United States) Joe Chaney	beat	(United States) Joe Huffman	$4,505	$1,250	$625
2018	(United States) Kevin Luke	beat	(United States) Alex Reyes	$4,505	$1,250	$625
2019	(United States) Robbie Phillips	beat	(Canada) Shawn Brenneman	$4,505	$1,250	$625
2020	(United States) Chris Lim	6–4	(United States) Danny Baggish	$4,505	$1,250	$625
2022	(United States) Jim Widmayer	6–4	(United States) Gary Mawson	$4,505	$1,250	$625
2023	(United States) Chris Lim (2)	6–5	(United States) Gary Mawson	$4,505	$1,250	$625
2024	Jacob Taylor	6–5	Jeff Smith	$8,040	$2,000	$1,000
2025	David Cameron	6–3	Jeff Springer	$8,040	$2,000	$1,000
2026	Jason Brandon	6–0	Alex Spellman	$9,280	$2,000	$1,200

=== Women's ===
Year	Champion	Score	Runner-up	Total Prize Money	Champion	Runner-up
2001	(United States) Carolyn Mars	beat	(United States) Stacy Bromberg			
2002	(United States) Lori Verrier	beat	(United States) Carolyn Mars			
2003	(United States) Carolyn Mars (2)	beat	(United States) Stacy Bromberg			
2004	(United States) Stacy Bromberg	beat	(England) Tricia Wright			
2005	(United States) Stacy Bromberg (2)	beat	(England) Tricia Wright			
2006	(United States) Marilyn Popp	beat	(United States) Stacy Bromberg			
2007	(United States) Stacy Bromberg (3)	beat	(United States) Marilyn Popp			
2008	(United States) Carolyn Mars (3)	beat	(United States) Suzie Hall			
2009	(Canada) Robin Curry	beat	(United States) Cali West			
2010	(United States) Stacy Bromberg (4)	beat	(Japan) Kumiko Nagasawa			
2011	(United States) Stacy Bromberg (5)	beat	(Canada) Cindy Hayhurst			
2012	(Canada) Cindy Hayhurst	beat	(England) Pennie Lewis			
2013	(United States) Shea Reynolds-Cole	beat	(Canada) Cindy Hayhurst			
2014	(United States) Cali West	beat	(United States) Shea Reynolds-Cole			
2015	(United States) Paula Murphy	beat	(Canada) Trish Grzesik			
2016	(United States) Paula Murphy (2)	beat	(England) Tricia Wright			
2017	(United States) Paula Murphy (3)	beat	(England) Tricia Wright			
2018	(United States) Paula Murphy (4)	beat	(United States) Debbie Ivey			
2019	(United States) Sandy Hudson	beat	(United States) Paula Murphy	$1,820	$600	$300
2020	(United States) Paula Murphy (5)	5–0	(United States) Kelly Meares	$1,820	$600	$300
2022	(United States) Julie Weger	5–4	(United States) Shea Cole	$1,820	$600	$300
2023	(United States) Paula Murphy (6)	5–2	(United States) Cali West	$1,820	$600	$300
2024	Fallon Sherrock	5–1	Wendy Reinstadtler	$3,520	$1,000	$500
2025	Deta Hedman	5–4	Rhian O'Sullivan	$3,520	$1,000	$500
2026	Deta Hedman (2)	5–4	Cali West	$4,040	$1,000	$600

== Las Vegas Classic ==
From 2024 a new tournament was created which would coincide with the Las Vegas Open, this was called the Las Vegas Classic. This was awarded as a silver ranked tournament by the World Darts Federation.

Men's

Year	Champion	Score	Runner-up	Total Prize Money	Champion	Runner-up
2024	Jeff Smith	5–0	(United States) Robbie Phillips	$4,160	$1,200	$600
2025	(United States) Chris Lim	5–4	(United States) David Fatum	$4,160	$1,200	$600
2026	(United States) Chris Lim (2)	5–2	(United States) Jason Brandon	$7,820	$1,500	$1,000

Women's

Year	Champion	Score	Runner-up	Total Prize Money	Champion	Runner-up
2024	(England) Fallon Sherrock	5–2	(England) Deta Hedman	$1,820	$600	$300
2025	(Wales) Rhian O'Sullivan	5–4	(Japan) Sayuri Nishiguchi	$1,820	$600	$300
2026	(England) Deta Hedman	5–2	(England) Wendy Reinstadtler	$3,410	$750	$500

== Tournament records ==
- Most wins ?:
- Most Finals ?:
- Most Semi Finals ?
- Most Quarter Finals ?:
- Most Appearances ?:
- Most Prize Money won $?:
- Best winning average (.) :
- Youngest Winner age ?:
- Oldest Winner age ?:

== See also ==
- List of BDO ranked tournaments
- List of WDF tournaments
