= 2004 World Darts Trophy =

World Darts Trophy

Tournament information
- Dates: 4 December 2004 – 12 December 2004
- Venue: De Vechtsebanen
- Location: Utrecht, Utrecht
- Country: the Netherlands
- Organisation(s): BDO / WDF
- Format: Men; Sets; Final – Best of 11 Sets; Women; Sets; Final – Best of 5 Sets
- High checkout: 170 (Australia) Tony David

Champion(s)
- (Netherlands) Raymond van Barneveld (men) (Netherlands) Francis Hoenselaar (women)

The 2004 Bavaria World Darts Trophy was the third edition of the World Darts Trophy, a professional darts tournament held at the De Vechtsebanen in Utrecht, the Netherlands, run by the British Darts Organisation and the World Darts Federation.

The 2003 winner, Raymond van Barneveld retained the trophy beating Martin Adams in the final of the men's event, 6–4 in sets. Andy Fordham. the BDO World Champion, was absent from the field this year in the men's event. In the women's event, the 2003 winner and the BDO World Champion, Trina Gulliver lost at the quarter-final stage to Anastasia Dobromyslova. Dobromyslova was then beaten by Francis Hoenselaar, last year's finalist, 3–1 in sets in the final.

== Seeds ==
Men

1. (Netherlands) Raymond van Barneveld
2. (England) Mervyn King
3. (England) Tony West
4. (England) Ted Hankey
5. (Australia) Tony David
6. (Scotland) Gary Anderson
7. (England) Tony O'Shea
8. (England) Darryl Fitton

== Prize money ==
=== Men ===
Pos	Money (Euros)
Winner	45,000
Runner-up	22,500
Semi-Finals	11,250
Quarter-Finals	6,000
Last 16	3,000
Last 32	2,000

== Men's tournament ==
First round Best of 5 sets
(Netherlands) Raymond van Barneveld	3
(New Zealand) Peter Hunt	1
(Netherlands) Andre Brantjes	2
(Sweden) Markus Korhonen	3
(England) Darryl Fitton	3
(Netherlands) Albertino Essers	0
(England) Davy Richardson	2
(England) Tony Eccles	3
(England) Ted Hankey	3
(England) John Walton	1
(Netherlands) Dick van Dijk	0
(England) Gary Robson	3
(Norway) Robert Wagner	3
(Finland) Marko Kantele	2
(England) Stephen Bunting	0
(Australia) Tony David	3
(England) Martin Adams	3
(Scotland) Gary Anderson	1
(Netherlands) Rick Hofstra	0
(Netherlands) Co Stompé	3
(England) Tony West	3
(Scotland) Mike Veitch	0
(Scotland) Bob Taylor	0
(Germany) Tomas Seyler	3
(England) Tony O'Shea	3
(Australia) Steve Duke	0
(Finland) Jarkko Komula	2
(Netherlands) Vincent van der Voort	3
(England) Shaun Greatbatch	3
(England) Martin Atkins	0
(England) Dave Routledge	0
(England) Mervyn King	3

Second round Best of 5 sets
(Netherlands) Raymond van Barneveld	3
(Sweden) Markus Korhonen	0
(England) Darryl Fitton	1
(England) Tony Eccles	3
(England) Ted Hankey	3
(England) Gary Robson	2
(Norway) Robert Wagner	2
(Australia) Tony David	3
(England) Martin Adams	3
(Netherlands) Co Stompé	1
(England) Tony West	2
(Germany) Tomas Seyler	3
(England) Tony O'Shea	3
(Netherlands) Vincent van der Voort	0
(England) Shaun Greatbatch	0
(England) Mervyn King	3

Quarter-Finals; Best of 9 sets
(Netherlands) Raymond van Barneveld	5
(England) Tony Eccles	0
(England) Ted Hankey	4
(Australia) Tony David	5
(England) Martin Adams	5
(Germany) Tomas Seyler	2
(England) Tony O'Shea	0
(England) Mervyn King	5

Semi-Finals; Best of 9 sets
(Netherlands) Raymond van Barneveld	5
(Australia) Tony David	3
(England) Martin Adams	5
(England) Mervyn King	4

Final; Best of 11 sets
(Netherlands) Raymond van Barneveld	6
(England) Martin Adams	4

== Women's tournament ==
Quarter-Finals; Best of 3 sets		Semi-Finals; Best of 3 sets		Final; Best of 5 sets
(Netherlands) Francis Hoenselaar	2
(Wales) Jan Robbins	1	(Netherlands) Francis Hoenselaar	2
(England) Crissy Manley	2	(England) Crissy Manley	0
(Sweden) Carina Ekberg	0			(Netherlands) Francis Hoenselaar	3
(England) Trina Gulliver	0			(Russia) Anastasia Dobromyslova	1
(Russia) Anastasia Dobromyslova	2	(Russia) Anastasia Dobromyslova	2
(Netherlands) Karin Krappen	0	(Netherlands) Mieke de Boer	0
(Netherlands) Mieke de Boer	2
