= 2010 Grand Slam of Darts =

2010 Daily Mirror Grand Slam of Darts

Tournament information
- Dates: 13–21 November 2010
- Venue: Wolverhampton Civic Hall
- Location: Wolverhampton
- Country: England
- Organisation(s): PDC
- Format: Legs
- Prize fund: £400,000
- Winner's share: £100,000
- High checkout: 170 (England) Colin Lloyd (Scotland) Gary Anderson

Champion(s)
- (England) Scott Waites

The 2010 Daily Mirror Grand Slam of Darts was the fourth staging of the darts tournament, the Grand Slam of Darts organised by the Professional Darts Corporation. The event took place from 13–21 November 2010 at the Wolverhampton Civic Hall, Wolverhampton, England. Television coverage of the tournament was covered by ITV Sport, with live coverage on ITV4. It would prove to be the final time a Grand Slam tournament would be broadcast on ITV Sport, as Sky Sports took over broadcasting rights the following year.

Although 8–0 down at one stage, Scott Waites made a remarkable comeback to defeat James Wade 16–12 in the final, becoming the first and only member of the British Darts Organisation to win this event.

== Prize money ==
Position (num. of players)		Prize money (Total: £400,000)
Winner	(1)	£100,000
Runner-up	(1)	£50,000
Semi-finalists	(2)	£25,000
Quarter-finalists	(4)	£15,000
Last 16 (second round)	(8)	£7,500
Third in group	(8)	£5,000
Fourth in group	(8)	£2,500
Group winner bonus	(8)	£2,500

== Qualifying ==
There were numerous tournaments that provided qualifying opportunities to players. Most tournaments offering a qualifying position for the winner and runner-up of the tournament, however the World Championships and the Grand Slams offers a place in the tournament to all semi-finalists. There were also various other ways of qualifying for overseas players, including those from Europe and the United States, as well as a wildcard qualifying event open to any darts player.

=== Qualifying tournaments ===
==== PDC ====
Tournament	Year	Position	Player	Qualifiers
Grand Slam of Darts	2008	Winner	(England) Phil Taylor	(England) Phil Taylor (England) Terry Jenkins (England) Mervyn King (Scotland) Gary Anderson (England) Scott Waites (Netherlands) Raymond van Barneveld (England) James Wade (Australia) Simon Whitlock (Wales) Mark Webster (England) Adrian Lewis (England) Colin Osborne (Netherlands) Co Stompé (England) Steve Beaton (England) Wayne Jones (England) Denis Ovens (Scotland) Robert Thornton (Australia) Paul Nicholson (United States) Stacy Bromberg (England) Tricia Wright (England) Arron Monk (Netherlands) Michael van Gerwen
Grand Slam of Darts	2008	Runner-Up	(England) Terry Jenkins	
Grand Slam of Darts	2008	Semi-finalists	(England) Mervyn King (Scotland) Gary Anderson	
Grand Slam of Darts	2009	Winner	(England) Phil Taylor	
Grand Slam of Darts	2009	Runner-Up	(England) Scott Waites	
Grand Slam of Darts	2009	Semi-finalists	(England) Terry Jenkins (Netherlands) Raymond van Barneveld	
PDC World Darts Championship	2009	Winner	(England) Phil Taylor	
PDC World Darts Championship	2009	Runner-Up	(Netherlands) Raymond van Barneveld	
PDC World Darts Championship	2009	Semi-finalists	(England) Mervyn King (England) James Wade	
PDC World Darts Championship	2010	Winner	(England) Phil Taylor	
PDC World Darts Championship	2010	Runner-Up	(Australia) Simon Whitlock	
PDC World Darts Championship	2010	Third Place	(Wales) Mark Webster	
PDC World Darts Championship	2010	Fourth Place	(Netherlands) Raymond van Barneveld	
World Matchplay	2009	Winner	(England) Phil Taylor	
World Matchplay	2009	Runner-Up	(England) Terry Jenkins	
World Matchplay	2010	Winner	(England) Phil Taylor	
World Matchplay	2010	Runner-Up	(Netherlands) Raymond van Barneveld	
World Grand Prix	2009	Winner	(England) Phil Taylor	
World Grand Prix	2009	Runner-Up	(Netherlands) Raymond van Barneveld	
World Grand Prix	2010	Winner	(England) James Wade	
World Grand Prix	2010	Runner-Up	(England) Adrian Lewis	
Las Vegas Desert Classic	2009	Winner	(England) Phil Taylor	
Las Vegas Desert Classic	2009	Runner-Up	(Netherlands) Raymond van Barneveld	
UK Open	2009	Winner	(England) Phil Taylor	
UK Open	2009	Runner-Up	(England) Colin Osborne	
UK Open	2010	Winner	(England) Phil Taylor	
UK Open	2010	Runner-Up	(Scotland) Gary Anderson	
Premier League Darts	2009	Winner	(England) James Wade	
Premier League Darts	2009	Runner-Up	(England) Mervyn King	
Premier League Darts	2010	Winner	(England) Phil Taylor	
Premier League Darts	2010	Runner-Up	(England) James Wade	
German Darts Championship	2008	Winner	(Netherlands) Co Stompé	
German Darts Championship	2008	Runner-Up	(England) Phil Taylor	
German Darts Championship	2009	Winner	(England) Phil Taylor	
German Darts Championship	2009	Runner-Up	(England) Mervyn King	
European Championship	2009	Winner	(England) Phil Taylor	
European Championship	2009	Runner-Up	(England) Steve Beaton	
European Championship	2010	Winner	(England) Phil Taylor	
European Championship	2010	Runner-Up	(England) Wayne Jones	
Championship League Darts	2009	Winner	(England) Colin Osborne	
Championship League Darts	2009	Runner-Up	(England) Phil Taylor	
Championship League Darts	2010	Winner	(England) James Wade	
Championship League Darts	2010	Runner-Up	(England) Phil Taylor	
Players Championship Finals	2009	Winner	(England) Phil Taylor	
Players Championship Finals	2009	Runner-Up	(Scotland) Robert Thornton	
Players Championship Finals	2010	Winner	(Australia) Paul Nicholson	
Players Championship Finals	2010	Runner-Up	(England) Mervyn King	
PDC Women's World Championship	2010	Winner	(United States) Stacy Bromberg	
PDC Women's World Championship	2010	Runner-Up	(England) Tricia Wright	
PDC Under-21 World Championship	2011	Finalists	(England) Arron Monk (Netherlands) Michael van Gerwen	
Note: Players in italics had already qualified for the tournament.

==== BDO ====
Tournament	Year	Position	Player	Qualifiers
BDO World Darts Championship	2009	Winner	(England) Ted Hankey	(England) Ted Hankey (England) Tony O'Shea (England) Darryl Fitton (England) Dave Chisnall (Wales) Martin Phillips
BDO World Darts Championship	2009	Runner-Up	(England) Tony O'Shea	(England) Ted Hankey (England) Tony O'Shea (England) Darryl Fitton (England) Dave Chisnall (Wales) Martin Phillips
BDO World Darts Championship	2009	Semi-finalists	(England) Darryl Fitton (England) ~~Martin Adams~~	(England) Ted Hankey (England) Tony O'Shea (England) Darryl Fitton (England) Dave Chisnall (Wales) Martin Phillips
BDO World Darts Championship	2010	Winner	(England) ~~Martin Adams~~	(England) Ted Hankey (England) Tony O'Shea (England) Darryl Fitton (England) Dave Chisnall (Wales) Martin Phillips
BDO World Darts Championship	2010	Runner-Up	(England) Dave Chisnall	(England) Ted Hankey (England) Tony O'Shea (England) Darryl Fitton (England) Dave Chisnall (Wales) Martin Phillips
BDO World Darts Championship	2010	Semi-finalists	(England) Tony O'Shea (Wales) Martin Phillips	(England) Ted Hankey (England) Tony O'Shea (England) Darryl Fitton (England) Dave Chisnall (Wales) Martin Phillips
Note: Players in italics had already qualified for the tournament.				(England) Ted Hankey (England) Tony O'Shea (England) Darryl Fitton (England) Dave Chisnall (Wales) Martin Phillips

The PDC decided to no longer invite Martin Adams to the Grand Slam due to his decision to turn down three consecutive invitations in 2007, 2008 and 2009.

==== Other Qualifiers ====
Criteria	Player
ITV Wildcard	(England) Wes Newton (Scotland) John Henderson (England) Mark Hylton (England) Justin Pipe
Highest Ranked Non-Qualifier On PDC Order of Merit	(England) Ronnie Baxter
Highest Ranked Non-Qualifier On Players Championship Order Of Merit	(England) Colin Lloyd
European Order of Merit Leader	(Netherlands) Vincent van der Voort

== Draw ==
=== Group stages ===
all matches first-to-5/best of 9.
NB in Brackets: Number = Seeds; BDO = BDO Darts player; RQ = Ranking qualifier; Q = Qualifier
NB: P = Played; W = Won; L = Lost; LF = Legs for; LA = Legs against; +/- = Plus/minus record, in relation to legs; Average = 3-dart average; Pts = Points

==== Group A ====
POS	Player	P	W	L	LF	LA	+/-	Pts	Status
1	(Scotland) Robert Thornton	3	3	0	15	6	+9	6	Advance to the last 16
2	(England) Colin Osborne	3	2	1	12	12	0	4	Advance to the last 16
3	(England) Dave Chisnall (BDO)	3	1	2	10	11	−1	2	Eliminated
4	(Australia) Simon Whitlock (3)	3	0	3	7	15	−8	0	Eliminated

13 November

86.16 Colin Osborne (England)	2 – 5	(Scotland) Robert Thornton 90.50
87.61 Simon Whitlock (Australia)	1 – 5	(England) Dave Chisnall 91.83

14 November

99.46 Colin Osborne (England)	5 – 4	(Australia) Simon Whitlock 101.00
96.60 Robert Thornton (Scotland)	5 – 2	(England) Dave Chisnall 94.91

16 November

95.25 Robert Thornton (Scotland)	5 – 2	(Australia) Simon Whitlock 93.98
93.78 Dave Chisnall (England)	3 – 5	(England) Colin Osborne 101.73

==== Group B ====
POS	Player	P	W	L	LF	LA	+/-	Pts	Status
1	(Scotland) Gary Anderson (6)	3	2	1	13	7	+6	4	Advance to the last 16
2	(England) Wayne Jones	3	2	1	12	10	+2	4	Advance to the last 16
3	(Wales) Mark Webster	3	2	1	12	11	+1	4	Eliminated
4	(England) Mark Hylton (Q)	3	0	3	6	15	−9	0	Eliminated

13 November

98.88 Gary Anderson (Scotland)	5 – 0	(England) Mark Hylton 90.52
93.79 Wayne Jones (England)	5 – 2	(Wales) Mark Webster 88.08

14 November

87.98 Mark Hylton (England)	3 – 5	(Wales) Mark Webster 92.57
93.70 Gary Anderson (Scotland)	5 – 2	(England) Wayne Jones 89.57

16 November

86.21 Mark Hylton (England)	3 – 5	(England) Wayne Jones 88.87
95.75 Mark Webster (Wales)	5 – 3	(Scotland) Gary Anderson 91.45

==== Group C ====
POS	Player	P	W	L	LF	LA	+/-	Pts	Status
1	(England) Mervyn King (7)	3	3	0	15	8	+7	6	Advance to the last 16
2	(England) Terry Jenkins	3	2	1	13	7	+6	4	Advance to the last 16
3	(Scotland) John Henderson (BDO, Q)	3	1	2	11	12	−1	2	Eliminated
4	(United States) Stacy Bromberg	3	0	3	3	15	−12	0	Eliminated

13 November

81.76 Mervyn King (England)	5 – 1	(United States) Stacy Bromberg 61.64
89.97 Terry Jenkins (England)	5 – 2	(Scotland) John Henderson 89.82

14 November

68.83 Stacy Bromberg (United States)	2 – 5	(Scotland) John Henderson 82.45
90.99 Mervyn King (Scotland)	5 – 3	(England) Terry Jenkins 90.97

16 November

70.96 Stacy Bromberg (United States)	0 – 5	(England) Terry Jenkins 87.38
92.16 John Henderson (Scotland)	4 – 5	(England) Mervyn King 87.69

==== Group D ====
POS	Player	P	W	L	LF	LA	+/-	Pts	Status
1	(England) Tony O'Shea (BDO)	3	3	0	15	6	+9	6	Advance to the last 16
2	(England) James Wade (2)	3	2	1	11	11	0	4	Advance to the last 16
3	(Netherlands) Vincent van der Voort (RQ)	3	1	2	10	11	−1	2	Eliminated
4	(England) Justin Pipe (Q)	3	0	3	7	15	−8	0	Eliminated

13 November

102.63 Tony O'Shea (England)	5 – 1	(Netherlands) Vincent van der Voort 100.92
88.61 James Wade (England)	5 – 2	(England) Justin Pipe 87.55

14 November

85.58 Vincent van der Voort (Netherlands)	5 – 1	(England) Justin Pipe 87.72
82.65 James Wade (England)	1 – 5	(England) Tony O'Shea 93.48

16 November

82.10 Justin Pipe (England)	4 – 5	(England) Tony O'Shea 92.15
94.17 Vincent van der Voort (Netherlands)	4 – 5	(England) James Wade 90.02

==== Group E ====
POS	Player	P	W	L	LF	LA	+/-	Pts	Status
1	(England) Scott Waites (BDO)	3	3	0	15	8	+7	6	Advance to the last 16
2	(Netherlands) Co Stompé	3	2	1	14	12	+2	4	Advance to the last 16
3	(Wales) Martin Phillips (BDO)	3	1	2	10	12	−2	2	Eliminated
4	(England) Adrian Lewis (5)	3	0	3	8	15	−7	0	Eliminated

14 November

91.66 Adrian Lewis (England)	2 – 5	(Wales) Martin Phillips 96.79
91.74 Co Stompé (Netherlands)	4 – 5	(England) Scott Waites 93.13

15 November

94.25 Adrian Lewis (England)	3 – 5	(Netherlands) Co Stompé 90.15
103.28 Martin Phillips (Wales)	1 – 5	(England) Scott Waites 103.38

17 November

98.53 Scott Waites (England)	5 – 3	(England) Adrian Lewis 93.91
94.30 Co Stompé (Netherlands)	5 – 4	(Wales) Martin Phillips 95.30

==== Group F ====
POS	Player	P	W	L	LF	LA	+/-	Pts	Status
1	(England) Colin Lloyd (RQ)	3	3	0	15	8	+7	6	Advance to the last 16
2	(Netherlands) Raymond van Barneveld (4)	3	2	1	13	6	+7	4	Advance to the last 16
3	(England) Darryl Fitton (BDO)	3	1	2	10	13	−3	2	Eliminated
4	(England) Tricia Wright	3	0	3	4	15	−11	0	Eliminated

14 November

86.38 Raymond van Barneveld (Netherlands)	5 – 0	(England) Tricia Wright 65.07
91.86 Colin Lloyd (England)	5 – 4	(England) Darryl Fitton 90.43

15 November

87.86 Darryl Fitton (England)	5 – 3	(England) Tricia Wright 76.47
94.34 Colin Lloyd (England)	5 – 3	(Netherlands) Raymond van Barneveld 97.30

17 November

82.36 Tricia Wright (England)	1 – 5	(England) Colin Lloyd 91.93
78.85 Darryl Fitton (England)	1 – 5	(Netherlands) Raymond van Barneveld 91.26

==== Group G ====
POS	Player	P	W	L	LF	LA	+/-	Pts	Status
1	(England) Ronnie Baxter (RQ)	3	2	1	13	8	+5	4	Advance to the last 16
2	(England) Steve Beaton	3	2	1	12	7	+5	4	Advance to the last 16
3	(Australia) Paul Nicholson (8)	3	2	1	11	12	−1	4	Eliminated
4	(England) Arron Monk	3	0	3	6	15	−9	0	Eliminated

14 November

95.43 Paul Nicholson (Australia)	5 – 4	(England) Arron Monk 92.47
89.92 Ronnie Baxter (England)	5 – 2	(England) Steve Beaton 88.29

15 November

94.73 Arron Monk (England)	1 – 5	(England) Steve Beaton 100.48
89.86 Paul Nicholson (Australia)	5 – 3	(England) Ronnie Baxter 87.28

17 November

95.44 Arron Monk (England)	1 – 5	(England) Ronnie Baxter 98.87
97.25 Steve Beaton (England)	5 – 1	(Australia) Paul Nicholson 90.80

==== Group H ====
POS	Player	P	W	L	LF	LA	+/-	Pts	Status
1	(England) Ted Hankey (BDO)	3	3	0	15	11	+4	6	Advance to the last 16
2	(England) Phil Taylor (1)	3	2	1	14	9	+5	4	Advance to the last 16
3	(England) Wes Newton (Q)	3	1	2	11	14	−3	2	Eliminated
4	(Netherlands) Michael van Gerwen	3	0	3	9	15	−6	0	Eliminated

14 November

89.88 Phil Taylor (England)	5 – 1	(Netherlands) Michael van Gerwen 76.01
86.77 Wes Newton (England)	3 – 5	(England) Ted Hankey 93.02

15 November

90.12 Michael van Gerwen (Netherlands)	4 – 5	(England) Wes Newton 88.10
97.22 Phil Taylor (England)	4 – 5	(England) Ted Hankey 103.75

17 November

92.09 Ted Hankey (England)	5 – 4	(Netherlands) Michael van Gerwen 89.17
93.82 Wes Newton (England)	3 – 5	(England) Phil Taylor 108.25

=== Knockout stages ===
Second round (best of 19 legs); 18–19 November
A1	(Scotland) Robert Thornton 90.41	6
B2	(England) Wayne Jones 90.62	10
B1	(Scotland) Gary Anderson (6) 98.54	10
A2	(England) Colin Osborne 84.20	3
C1	(England) Mervyn King (7) 95.39	9
D2	(England) James Wade (2) 92.80	10
D1	(England) Tony O'Shea (BDO) 101.24	7
C2	(England) Terry Jenkins 96.71	10
E1	(England) Scott Waites (BDO) 91.35	10
F2	(Netherlands) Raymond van Barneveld (4) 89.02	7
F1	(England) Colin Lloyd (RQ) 96.53	4
E2	(Netherlands) Co Stompé 101.44	10
G1	(England) Ronnie Baxter (RQ) 91.83	1
H2	(England) Phil Taylor (1) 99.75	10
H1	(England) Ted Hankey (BDO) 90.26	6
G2	(England) Steve Beaton 101.31	10

Quarter-finals (best of 31 legs); 20 November
B2	(England) Wayne Jones 94.65	16
B1	(Scotland) Gary Anderson (6) 95.78	15
D2	(England) James Wade (2) 94.41	16
C2	(England) Terry Jenkins 95.10	15
E1	(England) Scott Waites (BDO) 93.69	16
E2	(Netherlands) Co Stompé 93.15	10
H2	(England) Phil Taylor (1) 100.17	14
G2	(England) Steve Beaton 97.14	16

Semi-finals (best of 31 legs); 21 November
B2	(England) Wayne Jones 94.06	6
D2	(England) James Wade (2) 96.77	16
E1	(England) Scott Waites (BDO) 97.41	16
G2	(England) Steve Beaton 94.14	9

Final (best of 31 legs); 21 November
D2	(England) James Wade (2) 92.79	12
E1	(England) Scott Waites (BDO) 99.86	16

== Statistics ==
Player	Played	Legs Won	Legs Lost	100+	140+	180s	High Checkout	3-dart Average
(England) Phil Taylor	5							99.05
(Wales) Martin Phillips	3							98.46
(England) Tony O'Shea	4							97.38
(England) Scott Waites	7							96.81
(England) Steve Beaton	6							96.44
(Scotland) Gary Anderson	5							95.67
(England) Ted Hankey	4							94.78
(England) Arron Monk	3							94.21
(Australia) Simon Whitlock	3							94.20
(Netherlands) Co Stompé	5							94.16
(England) Colin Lloyd	4							93.67
(Netherlands) Vincent van der Voort	3							93.56
(England) Dave Chisnall	3							93.51
(Scotland) Robert Thornton	4							93.27
(England) Adrian Lewis	3							93.23
(England) Colin Osborne	4							92.89
(Wales) Mark Webster	3							92.13
(Australia) Paul Nicholson	3							92.03
(England) Ronnie Baxter	4							91.98
(England) Terry Jenkins	5							91.91
(England) Wayne Jones	6							91.86
(England) James Wade	7							91.25
(Netherlands) Raymond van Barneveld	4							90.99
(England) Wes Newton	3							89.96
(England) Mervyn King	4							88.96
(England) Mark Hylton	3							88.24
(Scotland) John Henderson	3							88.14
(England) Justin Pipe	3							85.79
(England) Darryl Fitton	3							85.71
(Netherlands) Michael van Gerwen	3							85.10
(England) Tricia Wright	3							74.83
(United States) Stacy Bromberg	3							67.14
