= 2003 WDF World Cup =

The 2003 WDF World Cup was the 14th edition of the WDF World Cup darts tournament, organised by the World Darts Federation. It was held in Épinal, France.

== Men's singles ==
=== Preliminary round ===
- (Philippines) Robert Calupit 2–4 (Finland) Marko Pusa
- (Philippines) Joseph Domanais 3–4 (Japan) Hiroshi Watanobe
- (Philippines) Celso Parfan 1–4 (Northern Ireland) Paul Watton
- (Philippines) Benedicto Ybanez 3–4 (Wales) Ritchie Davies

=== Knockout stage ===
Second round
(Finland)	Marko Pusa	4
(Norway)	Jacques Langston	3
(Scotland)	Mike Veitch	4
(Japan)	Hiroshi Watanobe	2
(England)	Martin Adams	4
(Germany)	Colin Rice	2
(Republic of Ireland)	John Ward	3
(Wales)	Peter Johns	4
(Australia)	Tony David	4
(Netherlands)	Vincent van der Voort	0
(New Zealand)	Robert Grant	2
(Malaysia)	Tengku Hadzali Shah	4
(United States)	Ray Carver	4
(Brazil)	Mauricio Maia	3
(Northern Ireland)	Paul Watton	4
(Denmark)	Ole Jorgensen	2
(Scotland)	Gary Anderson	4
(Malta)	Vincent Busuttil	1
(Northern Ireland)	Roy Montgomery	1
(Germany)	Andree Welge	4
(Wales)	Ritchie Davies	4
(United States)	John Kuczynski	2
(Malaysia)	Ravi Sandiran	4
(Japan)	Naoki Shinohara	3
(England)	Andy Fordham	4
(Australia)	Justin Thompson	0
(Finland)	Marko Kantele	4
(Austria)	August Jost	1
(Netherlands)	Co Stompé	4
(Turks and Caicos Islands)	James Fulford	0
(Gibraltar)	Dylan Duo	2
(Denmark)	Per Laursen	4
(England)	Mervyn King	4
(South Africa)	Gawie Roesstorff	0
(Netherlands)	Albertino Essers	2
(Canada)	Gerry Convery	4
(Finland)	Jarkko Komula	4
(Czech Republic)	David Miklas	3
(France)	Laurent Saillour	4
(New Zealand)	Peter Hunt	3
(Germany)	Tomas Seyler	4
(Belgium)	Rudy Delannoy	2
(Australia)	Steve Duke	4
(Switzerland)	Walter Tschudin	0
(Northern Ireland)	John Elder	4
(Italy)	Loris Polese	1
(Republic of Ireland)	Steven McDonnell	0
(Wales)	Martin Phillips	4
(Malaysia)	Anandan Tandrian	4
(The Bahamas)	Byron Payne	1
(England)	Tony O'Shea	4
(United States)	Bill Davis	0
(Denmark)	Brian Sorensen	2
(Austria)	Franz Thaler	4
(South Africa)	Roshan Sivraman	4
(Cyprus)	Savvas Antoniou	0
(Scotland)	Paul Hanvidge	4
(Switzerland)	Urs von Rufs	1
(Brazil)	Mario Portela	1
(Italy)	Sergio Pettarini	4
(Republic of Ireland)	Sean McGowan	3
(Canada)	Norm Tremblay	4
(Germany)	Jyhan Artut	0
(Netherlands)	Raymond van Barneveld	4

Third round
(Finland)	Marko Pusa	2
(Scotland)	Mike Veitch	4
(England)	Martin Adams	4
(Wales)	Peter Johns	3
(Australia)	Tony David	4
(Malaysia)	Tengku Hadzali Shah	1
(United States)	Ray Carver	2
(Northern Ireland)	Paul Watton	4
(Scotland)	Gary Anderson	4
(Germany)	Andree Welge	1
(Wales)	Ritchie Davies	4
(Malaysia)	Ravi Sandiran	0
(England)	Andy Fordham	1
(Finland)	Marko Kantele	4
(Netherlands)	Co Stompé	4
(Denmark)	Per Laursen	0
(England)	Mervyn King	4
(Canada)	Gerry Convery	1
(Finland)	Jarkko Komula	4
(France)	Laurent Saillour	1
(Germany)	Tomas Seyler	1
(Australia)	Steve Duke	4
(Northern Ireland)	John Elder	4
(Wales)	Martin Phillips	3
(Malaysia)	Anandan Tandrian	3
(England)	Tony O'Shea	4
(Austria)	Franz Thaler	4
(South Africa)	Roshan Sivraman	0
(Scotland)	Paul Hanvidge	4
(Italy)	Sergio Pettarini	1
(Canada)	Norm Tremblay	0
(Netherlands)	Raymond van Barneveld	4

Fourth round
(Scotland)	Mike Veitch	2
(England)	Martin Adams	4
(Australia)	Tony David	2
(Northern Ireland)	Paul Watton	4
(Scotland)	Gary Anderson	3
(Wales)	Ritchie Davies	4
(Finland)	Marko Kantele	4
(Netherlands)	Co Stompé	1
(England)	Mervyn King	3
(Finland)	Jarkko Komula	4
(Australia)	Steve Duke	4
(Northern Ireland)	John Elder	2
(England)	Tony O'Shea	4
(Austria)	Franz Thaler	3
(Scotland)	Paul Hanvidge	1
(Netherlands)	Raymond van Barneveld	4

Quarter-finals
(England)	Martin Adams	4
(Northern Ireland)	Paul Watton	2
(Wales)	Ritchie Davies	4
(Finland)	Marko Kantele	3
(Finland)	Jarkko Komula	4
(Australia)	Steve Duke	2
(England)	Tony O'Shea	0
(Netherlands)	Raymond van Barneveld	4

Semi-finals
(England)	Martin Adams	0
(Wales)	Ritchie Davies	4
(Finland)	Jarkko Komula	2
(Netherlands)	Raymond van Barneveld	4

Final
(Wales)	Ritchie Davies	3
(Netherlands)	Raymond van Barneveld	4

== Women's singles ==
Quarter-finals
(Germany)	Heike Ernst	4
(Finland)	Marika Juhola	1
(England)	Trina Gulliver	4
(Japan)	Yukari Nishikawa	1
(Sweden)	Carina Ekberg	4
(Scotland)	Anne Kirk	1
(Netherlands)	Francis Hoenselaar	4
(Russia)	Anastasia Dobromyslova	3

Semi-finals
(Germany)	Heike Ernst	0
(England)	Trina Gulliver	4
(Sweden)	Carina Ekberg	4
(Netherlands)	Francis Hoenselaar	1

Final
(England)	Trina Gulliver	4
(Sweden)	Carina Ekberg	0

== Other Winners ==
Event	Winner	Score	Runner-up
Men's Team	(United States) Ray Carver; John Kuczynski; Bill Davis; George Walls	9-7	(Netherlands) Co Stompé; Albertino Essers; Raymond van Barneveld; Vincent van der Voort
Men's Pairs	(England) Martin Adams; Mervyn King	4-1	(England) Andy Fordham; Tony O'Shea
Women's Pairs	(England) Trina Gulliver; Clare Bywaters	4-2	(Netherlands) Karin Krappen; Francis Hoenselaar
Youth Singles - Boys	(Netherlands) Jerry Hendriks	3-0	(Northern Ireland) Richard Dunlop
Youth Singles - Girls	(Netherlands) Kate Dando	3-2	(South Africa) Shunet Luke
Youth Pairs	(Australia) Kyle Anderson; Kathleen Logue	3-2	(Sweden) Oskar Lukasiak; Marie Fogde

== Final Points Tables ==
=== Men ===
Ranking	Team	Points
1	England	114
2	Netherlands	98
3	United States	79
4	Finland	66
5	Northern Ireland	52

=== Women ===
Ranking	Team	Points
1	England	48
2	Netherlands	34
3	Finland	21
4	Sweden	17
5	Germany	14

=== Youth ===
Ranking	Team	Points
1	Australia	54
2	Netherlands	47
3	England	39
4	South Africa	33
5	Northern Ireland	25
