= Scott Waites =

English darts player (born 1977)

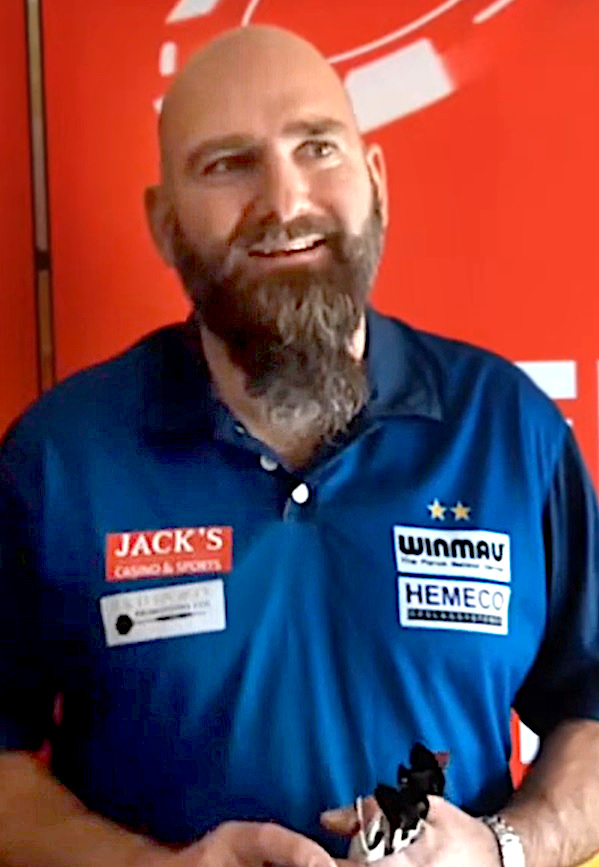
- Waites in 2022

Personal information
- Nickname: "Scotty 2 Hotty"
- Born: 17 February 1977 (age 49) Bradford, West Yorkshire, England
- Home town: Halifax, West Yorkshire, England

Sport
- Sport: Darts
- Playing since: 1992
- Darts: 23g Winmau Signature
- Laterality: Right-handed
- Walk-on music: "Chelsea Dagger" by The Fratellis

Organisation (see split in darts)
- BDO: 2004–2020
- PDC: 2020–present (Tour Card: 2020–2023)
- Current world ranking: (PDC) 118 ▼1 (5 November 2026)

WDF major events – best performances
- World Championship: Winner (2): 2013, 2016
- World Masters: Winner (1): 2011
- World Trophy: Quarter-final: 2016
- Int. Darts League: Last 16 Group Stage: 2007
- Finder Masters: Winner (1): 2011
- Dutch Open: Winner (2): 2007, 2013

PDC premier events – best performances
- World Championship: Last 64: 2021
- UK Open: Last 32: 2008, 2021, 2022
- Grand Slam: Winner (1): 2010
- PC Finals: Last 64: 2020

Other tournament wins
- Years
BDO Gold Cup	2008
Belgium Open	2008
British Classic	2015
British Open	2011
Czech Open	2010, 2012, 2013
European Darts Classic	2016
Isle of Man Classic	2014
Isle of Man Open	2019
Jersey Open	2017
Romanian Open	2014
Six Nations Cup	2010
Slovak Open	2018
Swedish Open	2008, 2011
Tops of Ghent	2012
Turkish Open	2010
Welsh Masters	2007
WDF Europe Cup Pairs	2010, 2014
WDF World Cup Singles	2011
WDF World Cup Team	2011
PDC Challenge Tour
2025 CT20

Scott Waites (born 17 February 1977) is an English professional darts player who competes in Professional Darts Corporation (PDC) events. Waites formerly competed in British Darts Organisation (BDO) events. He is a two-time BDO World Champion having won the 2013 and 2016 World Championships. He also won two other BDO major titles in 2011; the World Masters and Finder Masters, as well as the WDF World Cup Singles the same year.

Waites won his only PDC major title at the 2010 Grand Slam of Darts, becoming the only BDO representative to win the event.

== Career ==
Waites' first career success came in February 2007 when he won the Dutch Open an event which attracted 2867 entries. He also took the Welsh Masters title in March 2007 and earlier reached the final of the 2007 Scottish Open.

Barry Hearn confirmed on 13 August 2007 via the official PDC website, that Scott Waites was the highest ranked non-qualifier in the BDO that had accepted his invitation to compete in the inaugural Grand Slam of Darts, alongside Dennis Priestley (highest PDC non-qualifier). At the tournament he failed to qualify for the knockout stage, losing all three group matches to Michael van Gerwen, Mervyn King and Roland Scholten.

He made his World Championship debut at the 2008 BDO World Darts Championship and reached the quarter-finals, defeating Mike Veitch and Remco van Eijden before losing to Brian Woods.

Waites was one of 32 pub qualifiers for the 2008 PDC UK Open, reaching to the last 32 stage, losing to Ronnie Baxter.

On 12 July 2008 Waites won the 2008 BDO Gold Cup, beating Gary Anderson four sets to two in the final. In December 2008, Waites reached his first major BDO final, reaching the Winmau World Masters final. He was beaten 7–6 by Martin Adams, but ended the year ranked #1 on the WDF rankings due to his consistent season.

Through his performances at the World Masters, the World Championship and also the Zuiderduin Masters, Waites became the number one ranked player on the BDO world rankings. Waites reached the quarter finals of the 2009 BDO World Championship, losing to Darryl Fitton 5–4 having led 4–2.

He entered the 2009 Winmau World Masters as the number two seed, and despite having had several darts to win the match, lost in the last 16 stage in a major upset to Lourence Ilagan of the Philippines.

Waites reached the final of the 2009 Grand Slam of Darts, a PDC major held at Wolverhampton Civic Centre, where he was beaten 16–2 by PDC world number one Phil Taylor. This earned Waites £50,000, which was at the time his biggest success in the game.

For some of his matches he has used Chelsea Dagger by The Fratellis as his entrance music. However at the 2009 Grand Slam of Darts, Waites used Walk This Way by Run-D.M.C., to avoid a clash with Chelsea Dagger, the music played during breaks.

Waites entered the 2010 BDO World Championship as the 2nd seed. For the third consecutive year, he was knocked out at the quarter final stage, this time by Martin Phillips of Wales. Waites had recovered from 4–0 down to level at 4–4 before Phillips prevailed.

At the 2010 World Masters, Waites reached the Quarter Finals, before losing to eventual champion Martin Adams.

At the 2010 Grand Slam of Darts, Waites once again reached the final by winning all three of his group matches, then following up with comprehensive victories over Raymond van Barneveld, Co Stompé and Steve Beaton (who had earlier eliminated Taylor). Waites played James Wade in the final, and defeated the PDC world #2 16–12 having trailed 8–0. The win was Waites's first in either a PDC or a BDO major, and made him the first player from the BDO (and the first player from either code other than Phil Taylor) to win the Grand Slam.

Waites was the sixth seed for the 2011 BDO World Championship and was second favourite with bookmakers at the start of the tournament. In the first round he defeated the unseeded two-time champion Ted Hankey 3–0, but in the second round he lost 4–2 to another unseeded player, Stephen Bunting.

At the 2011 World Masters in Hull, Waites defeated Ewan Hyslop in the Last 16, Gary Robson in the Quarter-Finals, defending champion Martin Adams in the semi-finals, and World Championship runner-up Dean Winstanley in the final to win his first World Masters title.

Waites continued his impressive run of form by winning the BDO British Open beating Willy van de Wiel 3–1 and WDF World Cup beating Martin Adams 6–2. He then won his third major championship at the Zuiderduin Masters, beating former champion Darryl Fitton 5–4 in the final after Fitton missed darts to win. However, Waites was beaten in the second round at the 2012 BDO World Championship 4–3 by Ted Hankey.

At the 2012 Grand Slam of Darts, Waites topped his group by beating Phil Taylor 5–2, avenging his heavy loss to the same player in the 2009 final. He was eliminated in the quarter-finals by Michael van Gerwen 16–12.

Waites went into the 2013 BDO World Championship as number three seed and bookmakers' favourite. He beat Willy van de Wiel 3–0 in the first round, Geert De Vos 4–1 in the second round, and Paul Jennings 5–2 in the quarter-final to reach the semi-finals for the first time. He then beat Richie George 6–1 to set up a final against two-time runner-up Tony O'Shea, which Waites won 7–1 to win the title.

Waites had a lower-profile season in 2013–14, suffering early exits in the Winmau Masters and Zuiderduin Masters and not being selected to defend his WDF World Cup singles title. He did enjoy another good run at the PDC Grand Slam, reaching the semi-finals before being defeated by Robert Thornton. However, his season ended in disappointment when, as the defending champion, he was eliminated in the first round of the 2014 BDO World Darts Championship 3–0 by eventual runner-up Alan Norris. It was the first time Waites had lost in the first round of the world championship, and afterwards he complained of a lack of preparation due to injuries as well as a power-cut shortly before his match started, though he still gave credit to Norris for his performance.

Waites's indifferent form continued at the start of the 2014–15 season when he lost in the first round of the World Trophy to Jim Williams.

At the 2015 World Championship, Waites opened his campaign with a 3–2 win over Sam Hewson, to set up a second-round tie with Ross Montgomery, which he lost 4–0.

Waites pulled out of the 2015 World Trophy due to having an operation on his shoulder; this put him out of action for a couple of months. He returned in March, and won the British Classic defeating Glen Durrant in the final. He also reached a further 4 finals.

Entering the 2016 World Championship as the 9th seed, Waites won his second World Championship by beating Canada's Jeff Smith 7–1 in the final.

=== PDC ===
It was announced after his first round victory at the 2019 BDO World Darts Championship that he would be heading to PDC Q School after the Lakeside tournament and could finally make the switch to the other side of the sport, if all went to plan in Wigan. However, Waites failed to earn a tour card in the four day qualifying event and subsequently remained in the BDO. He entered the following weekend's PDC Challenge Tour events. Once again he competed for a tour card at the 2020 Q School to join the Professional Darts Corporation. This time he was successful, beating Keane Barry 5–0 in a play-off match on the final day to earn a two-year PDC Tour Card.

In his PDC World Championship debut in 2021 he beat Matt Campbell 3–2 in the first round, before losing to Nathan Aspinall by the same score in the second, despite having 4 match darts.

In 2022, Waites reached the quarter-finals at Players Championship 13. He finished the season 90th on the PDC Order of Merit.

In 2023, Waites reached the quarter-finals at Players Championship 30. However, he finished the season 75th on the PDC Order of Merit. As he was outside the top 64 after two years he therefore lost his tour card and failed to regain it at Q School.

After losing his tour card, Waites competed on the PDC Challenge Tour, winning event 20 in 2025.

== Personal life ==
Waites was born in Bradford, West Yorkshire. He currently resides in Huddersfield, West Yorkshire. He has a stepson, Michael, with his ex-partner. He has been with his current partner Louise since 2019.

Waites was not a full-time professional player during his time on the BDO circuit, he was at the time a carpenter for Pennine Housing 2000, a member of the Together Housing Group who also acted as a sponsor. Waites quit his job in 2020 after successfully gaining a 2-year PDC tour card at Q School and was a full time professional dart player in the PDC.

Waites supports Liverpool F.C.

== World Championship performances ==
=== BDO ===
- 2008: Quarter-final (lost to Brian Woods 3–5)
- 2009: Quarter-final (lost to Darryl Fitton 4–5)
- 2010: Quarter-final (lost to Martin Phillips 4–5)
- 2011: 2nd round (lost to Stephen Bunting 2–4)
- 2012: 2nd round (lost to Ted Hankey 3–4)
- 2013: Winner (beat Tony O'Shea 7–1)
- 2014: 1st round (lost to Alan Norris 0–3)
- 2015: 2nd round (lost to Ross Montgomery 0–4)
- 2016: Winner (beat Jeff Smith 7–1)
- 2017: Quarter-final (lost to Danny Noppert 3–5)
- 2018: Semi-final (lost to Glen Durrant 2–6)
- 2019: Runner-up (lost to Glen Durrant 3–7)
- 2020: Quarter-final (lost to Scott Mitchell 4–5)

=== PDC ===
- 2021: 2nd round (lost to Nathan Aspinall 2–3)

== Career finals ==
=== BDO major finals: 7 (4 titles) ===
Legend
World Championship (2–1)
Winmau World Masters (1–1)
Zuiderduin Masters (1–1)

Outcome	No.	Year	Championship	Opponent in the final	Score (Note: (l) = score in legs, (s) = score in sets.)
Runner-up	1.	2008	Winmau World Masters	(England) Martin Adams	6–7 (s)
Runner-up	2.	2008	Zuiderduin Masters	(Scotland) Gary Anderson	4–5 (s)
Winner	1.	2011	Winmau World Masters	(England) Dean Winstanley	7–2 (s)
Winner	2.	2011	Zuiderduin Masters	(England) Darryl Fitton	5–4 (s)
Winner	3.	2013	World Championship	(England) Tony O'Shea	7–1 (s)
Winner	4.	2016	World Championship	(Canada) Jeff Smith	7–1 (s)
Runner-up	3.	2019	World Championship	(England) Glen Durrant	3–7 (s)

=== WDF major finals: 1 (1 title) ===
Outcome	No.	Year	Championship	Opponent in the final	Score
Winner	1.	2011	World Cup Singles	(England) Martin Adams	7–3 (s)

=== PDC premier event finals: 2 (1 title) ===
Outcome	No.	Year	Championship	Opponent in the final	Score
Runner-up	1.	2009	Grand Slam	Phil Taylor	2–16 (l)
Winner	1.	2010	Grand Slam	James Wade	16–12 (l)

== Performance timeline ==
Scott Waites' performance timeline is as follows:

=== BDO ===
Tournament	2006	2007	2008	2009	2010	2011	2012	2013	2014	2015	2016	2017	2018	2019	2020
BDO Ranked televised events
World Championship	DNQ		QF	QF	QF	2R	2R	W	1R	2R	W	QF	SF	F	QF
World Trophy	Not held								1R	DNP	QF	1R	1R	1R	PDC
World Masters	4R	DNP	F	6R	QF	W	5R	QF	5R	QF	6R	5R	QF	F	PDC
Finder Masters	NH	RR	F	QF	RR	W	DNP	RR	RR	RR	RR	QF	RR	NH	
International Darts League	DNP	RR	Not held												
World Darts Trophy	DNP	2R	Not held												

=== PDC ===
Tournament	2007	2008	2009	2010	2011	2012	2013	2014	2016	2020	2021	2022	2023	2025	2026
PDC Ranked televised events
World Championship	BDO										2R	DNQ			
World Masters (Note: A non-ranked event until 2025.)	Not held													DNQ	Prel.
UK Open	DNP	4R	BDO							4R	5R	5R	2R	DNQ	1R
Players Championship Finals	Not held		BDO							1R	DNQ				
PDC Non-ranked televised events
Grand Slam (Note: A ranked event from 2015)	RR	DNQ	F	W	RR	QF	SF	RR	RR	Did not qualify					
Career statistics
Year-end ranking	Not ranked									75	66	90	75	180	

==== European Tour ====
Season	1	2	3	4	5	6	7	8	9	10	11	12	13
2020	BDC; DNQ	GDC; 2R	EDG; 2R	IDO; DNQ									
2021	HDT; DNQ	GDT; DNQ											
2022	IDO; DNQ	GDC; 2R	GDG; 3R	ADO; DNQ	EDO; DNQ	CDO; 1R	EDG; DNQ	DDC; 2R	DNQ				
2023	DNQ			GDG; 1R	DNQ							HDT; 2R	GDC; 1R

==== Players Championships ====
Season	1	2	3	4	5	6	7	8	9	10	11	12	13	14	15	16	17	18	19	20	21	22	23	24	25	26	27	28	29	30	31	32	33	34
2020	BAR; 2R	BAR; 4R	WIG; 1R	WIG; 1R	WIG; 1R	WIG; 3R	BAR; 2R	BAR; 2R	MIL; 1R	MIL; 1R	MIL; 1R	MIL; DNP	MIL; 1R	NIE; 4R	NIE; 1R	NIE; 2R	NIE; 3R	NIE; 2R	COV; 3R	COV; 1R	COV; 1R	COV; 2R	COV; 2R											
2021	BOL; 3R	BOL; 1R	BOL; 1R	BOL; 2R	MIL; 1R	MIL; 2R	MIL; 1R	MIL; 4R	NIE; DNP				MIL; 1R	MIL; 1R	MIL; 1R	MIL; 3R	COV; DNP			COV; 3R	BAR; 3R	BAR; 1R	BAR; 2R	BAR; 2R	BAR; 2R	BAR; 2R	BAR; 3R	BAR; 1R	BAR; 1R	BAR; 1R				
2022	BAR; 1R	BAR; 2R	WIG; 1R	WIG; 1R	BAR; 1R	BAR; 1R	NIE; 1R	NIE; 1R	BAR; 1R	BAR; 1R	BAR; 1R	BAR; 4R	BAR; QF	WIG; 1R	WIG; 3R	NIE; 1R	NIE; 1R	BAR; 2R	BAR; 4R	BAR; 1R	BAR; 1R	BAR; 1R	BAR; 2R	BAR; 2R	BAR; 2R	BAR; 2R	BAR; 3R	BAR; 1R	BAR; 1R	BAR; 2R				
2023	BAR; 1R	BAR; 1R	BAR; 3R	BAR; 1R	BAR; 2R	BAR; 1R	HIL; 1R	HIL; 1R	WIG; 2R	WIG; 1R	LEI; 3R	LEI; 1R	HIL; 3R	HIL; 3R	LEI; 1R	LEI; 1R	HIL; 1R	HIL; 1R	BAR; 3R	BAR; 3R	BAR; 2R	BAR; 2R	BAR; 1R	BAR; 1R	BAR; 2R	BAR; 1R	BAR; 1R	BAR; 3R	BAR; 3R	BAR; QF				
2025	Did not participate																				LEI; 1R	Did not participate						LEI; 2R	LEI; 1R	LEI; 3R	WIG; 1R	WIG; 4R	WIG; 1R	WIG; 1R
2026	HIL; DNP		WIG; 3R	WIG; 2R	LEI; 2R	LEI; 4R	LEI; 2R	LEI; 1R	WIG; 1R	WIG; F	Did not participate				LEI; 2R	LEI; 1R	Did not participate								HIL; 1R	HIL; 1R	LEI; 1R	LEI; 1R	ROS; DNP		ROS; 1R	ROS; 1R	LEI; DNP	

Performance Table Legend
W	Won the tournament	F	Finalist	SF	Semifinalist	QF	Quarterfinalist	#R; RR; Prel.	Lost in # round Round-robin; Preliminary round	DQ	Disqualified
DNQ	Did not qualify	DNP	Did not participate	WD	Withdrew	NH	Tournament not held	#R; RR; Prel.	Lost in # round Round-robin; Preliminary round	NYF	Not yet founded

== High averages ==
Scott Waites televised high averages
Average	Date	Opponent	Tournament	Stage	Score	Ref.
105.12	11 December 2011	(England) Martin Adams	2011 Zuiderduin Masters	Semi final	3–2 (S)	
