= Tricia Wright =

English darts player

Personal information
- Nickname: "The Wright Stuff"
- Born: 1 September 1958 (age 68) Epping, Essex, England
- Home town: Mitcham, Surrey, England

Sport
- Sport: Darts
- Playing since: 1994
- Darts: 29g Tungsten Slims
- Laterality: Right
- Walk-on music: "You Got It (The Right Stuff)" by New Kids on the Block

Organisation (see split in darts)
- BDO: 1994–2005, 2013–2020
- PDC: 2005, 2020 Q School
- Current world ranking: (WDF W) NR (17 August 2026)

WDF major events – best performances
- World Championship: Last 16: 2018
- World Masters: Semi Final: 2017
- World Trophy: Last 16: 2018
- Finder Masters: Runner Up: 2009

PDC premier events – best performances
- World Championship: (Women's) Runner Up: 2010
- Grand Slam: Group Stage: 2010
- Desert Classic: Winner (1): 2006

Tricia Wright (born 1 September 1958) is an English former professional darts player from Mitcham in Surrey. Her nickname was The Wright Stuff.

== Career ==
Wright competed in the first PDC Women's World Championship final in 2010, losing 6-5 to Stacy Bromberg despite having four darts to win it. She played at the 2010 Grand Slam of Darts, losing all 3 of her group matches to Raymond van Barneveld, Darryl Fitton and Colin Lloyd.

Since 2001 she has won over 50 amateur titles.

Wright was due to be one of three ladies to play on the 2011 PDC ProTour, along with Bromberg and Anastasia Dobromyslova but after the PDC decided to drop the Women's World championship and thus its qualification to the Grand Slam of Darts she decided to go back to the BDO without playing a single PDC event.

== World Championship results ==
=== PDC ===
- 2010: Runner-up (lost to Stacy Bromberg 5–6)

=== BDO ===
- 2018: Last 16: lost to Lorraine Winstanley 0–2)

== Career finals ==
=== BDO major finals: 1 (1 runner-up) ===
Outcome	No.	Year	Championship	Opponent in the final	Score (Note: (l) = score in legs, (s) = score in sets.)
Runner-up	1.	2009	Zuiderduin Masters	(Wales) Julie Gore	0–2 (s)

=== PDC premier event finals: 1 (1 runner-up) ===
Outcome	No.	Year	Championship	Opponent in the final	Score
Runner-up	1.	2010	PDC Women's World Championship	(United States) Stacy Bromberg	5–6 (l)
