= 2010 PDC Women's World Darts Championship =

Women's darts event

PDC Women's World Championship

Tournament information
- Dates: 12 June and 24 July
- Venue: Metrodome (until semi-finals); Empress Ballroom (final)
- Location: Barnsley, South Yorkshire; Blackpool, Lancashire
- Country: England
- Organisation(s): Professional Darts Corporation
- Format: Legs
- Prize fund: £30,000
- Winner's share: £10,000

Champion(s)
- (United States) Stacy Bromberg

The 2010 PDC Women's World Championship was the only ever staging of the PDC Women's World Darts Championship, and the first women's tournament to be organised by the Professional Darts Corporation. It was one of the three new tournaments that the PDC created in 2010, following the rejection of its offer to buy out the British Darts Organisation.

The initial stages of the tournament were played at the Metrodome in Barnsley on 12 June. The final was played during the World Matchplay at the Empress Ballroom in Blackpool, on Saturday July 24, where Stacy Bromberg defeated Tricia Wright to become the only champion of the event.

== Prize money ==
Stage	Prize money
First round	£0
Second round	£625
Quarter-finals	£1,250
Semi-finals	£2,500
Final	£5,000
Winner	£10,000

== Qualification ==
Qualification was achieved at 20 tournaments throughout the UK and also various national tournaments throughout the world. Anastasia Dobromyslova did not have to qualify as she was already a member of the PDPA.

The participants were:

=== Qualification tournaments ===
- (Germany) Irina Armstrong
- (England) Ann Chilton
- (England) Tara Deamer
- (England) Clare Bywaters
- (Wales) Glad Davies
- (Wales) Paula Clemett
- (England) Juliet Findley
- (England) Deta Hedman
- (England) Emma Pearce
- (England) Rebecca Rose
- (England) Donna Rainsley
- (England) Louise Carroll
- (England) Sue Cusick
- (England) Fiona Carmichael
- (England) Tricia Wright
- (Scotland) Kate Monaghan
- (England) Linda Jones
- (England) Marlene Badger
- (England) Terri-Ann Bellamy
- (Scotland) Zoe McIntyre

=== PDPA Member ===
- (Russia) Anastasia Dobromyslova

=== National Championships qualifiers ===
- (Republic of Ireland) Sharon O'Brien
- (Republic of Ireland) Denise Cassidy
- (Germany) Stefanie Lück
- (Germany) Sabrina Spörle
- (United States) Stacy Bromberg
- (Canada) Cindy Hayhurst
- (Australia) Lavinia Hogg
- (Sweden) Deana Rosenblom
- (Finland) Marika Juhola
- (Russia) Irina Borovkova
- (Japan) Kazumi Nakagawa
- (Denmark) Janni Larsen

== Draw ==
Players in bold denote match winners.

=== Preliminary round ===
- (England) **Tricia Wright** **4**– 3 Janni Larsen (Denmark)

=== Knockout stage ===
**Round 1** (best of 7 legs); 12 June
(England) **Tricia Wright**	**4**
(Wales) Paula Clemett	1
(England) **Rebecca Rose**	**4**
(England) Kate Monaghan	0
(England) Clare Bywaters	3
(Republic of Ireland) **Sharon O'Brien**	**4**
(England) Sue Cusick	2
(England) **Terri-Ann Bellamy**	**4**
(England) **Deta Hedman**	**4**
(Germany) Irina Armstrong	0
(England) **Ann Chilton**	**4**
(Scotland) Zoe McIntyre	0
(England) **Fiona Carmichael**	**4**
(Russia) Irina Borovkova	3
(Canada) **Cindy Hayhurst**	**4**
(England) Marlene Badger	3
(Russia) **Anastasia Dobromyslova**	**4**
(England) Glad Davies	1
(Finland) **Marika Juhola**	**4**
(England) Emma Pearce	3
(Germany) **Sabrina Spörle**	**4**
(Germany) Stefanie Lück	2
(England) **Louise Carroll**	**4**
(England) Tara Deamer	1
(United States) **Stacy Bromberg**	**4**
(Japan) Kazumi Nakagawa	0
(England) **Donna Rainsley**	**4**
(England) Juliet Findley	2
(Republic of Ireland) **Denise Cassidy**	**4**
(Sweden) Deana Rosenblom	3
(Australia) **Lavinia Hogg**	**4**
(England) Linda Jones	2

**Round 2** (best of 7 legs); 12 June
(England) **Tricia Wright**	**4**
(England) Rebecca Rose	1
(Republic of Ireland) **Sharon O'Brien**	**4**
(England) Terri-Ann Bellamy	1
(England) **Deta Hedman**	**4**
(England) Ann Chilton	3
(England) **Fiona Carmichael**	**4**
(Canada) Cindy Hayhurst	2
(Russia) **Anastasia Dobromyslova**	**4**
(Finland) Marika Juhola	0
(Germany) **Sabrina Spörle**	**4**
(England) Louise Carroll	3
(United States) **Stacy Bromberg**	**4**
(England) Donna Rainsley	2
(Republic of Ireland) **Denise Cassidy**	**4**
(Australia) Lavinia Hogg	1

**Quarter-finals** (best of 7 legs); 12 June
(England) **Tricia Wright**	**4**
(Republic of Ireland) Sharon O'Brien	2
(England) Deta Hedman	2
(England) **Fiona Carmichael**	**4**
(Russia) **Anastasia Dobromyslova**	**4**
(Germany) Sabrina Spörle	3
(United States) **Stacy Bromberg**	**4**
(Republic of Ireland) Denise Cassidy	2

**Semi-finals** (best of 7 legs); 12 June
(England) **Tricia Wright**	**4**
(England) Fiona Carmichael	3
(Russia) Anastasia Dobromyslova	3
(United States) **Stacy Bromberg**	**4**

**Final** (best of 11 legs); 24 July
(England) Tricia Wright 63.27	5
(United States) **Stacy Bromberg** 65.20	**6**

== Representation from different countries ==
This table shows the number of players by country in the World Championship.

	(England) ENG	(Wales) WAL	(Republic of Ireland) IRL	(Scotland) SCO	(Northern Ireland) NIR	(Germany) GER	(Russia) RUS	(Finland) FIN	(United States) USA	(Japan) JPN	(Sweden) SWE	(Australia) AUS	(Canada) CAN	Total
Final	1	0	0	0	0	0	0	0	1	0	0	0	0	2
Semis	2	0	0	0	0	0	1	0	1	0	0	0	0	4
Quarters	3	0	1	0	1	1	1	0	1	0	0	0	0	8
Round 2	8	0	1	0	1	1	1	1	1	0	0	1	1	16
Round 1	17	1	1	1	1	3	2	1	1	1	1	1	1	32
Total	17	1	1	1	1	3	2	1	1	1	1	1	1	32
