= Tony O'Shea =

English darts player (born 1961)

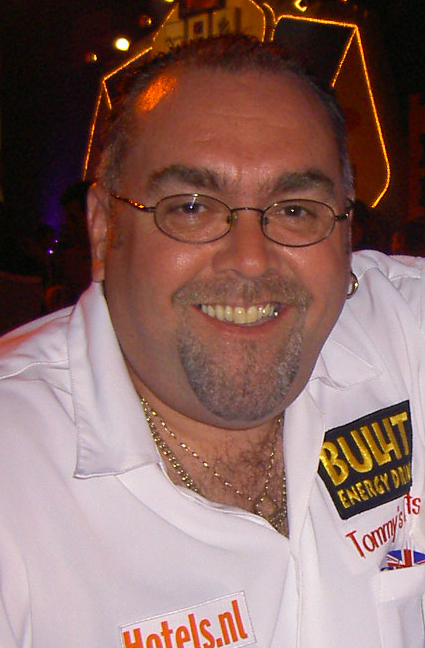
- O'Shea in 2005

Personal information
- Nickname: "Silverback"
- Born: 9 May 1961 (age 65) Stockport, Cheshire, England

Sport
- Sport: Darts
- Playing since: 1979
- Darts: 24g Target Signature
- Laterality: Right-handed
- Walk-on music: "Hey Baby" by DJ Ötzi

Organisation (see split in darts)
- BDO: 1995-2020
- WDF: 1995–

WDF major events – best performances
- World Championship: Runner-up: 2009, 2012, 2013
- World Masters: Runner-up: 2004, 2012
- World Trophy: Runner-up: 2002
- Int. Darts League: Runner-up: 2005
- Finder Masters: Semi-final: 2002, 2003, 2008, 2010, 2014
- Dutch Open: Winner (1): 2012

PDC premier events – best performances
- Grand Slam: Quarter-final: 2009, 2013

WSDT major events – best performances
- World Championship: Last 16: 2025
- World Matchplay: Last 16: 2024
- World Masters: Semi-final: 2022

Other tournament wins
- Years
| BDO International Open | 2009 |
| Isle of Man Open | 2016 |
| Jersey Classic | 2014 |
| Northern Ireland Open | 2011 |
| Polish Open | 2012 |
| Romanian Open | 2013 |
| Scottish Open | 2009 |
| Swiss Open | 2003 |
| Turkish Open | 2009, 2017 |
| Welsh Classic | 2009 |
| Welsh Masters | 2008 |

Other achievements
- Clackmanam Open 2010; Dutch Pentathlon 2010; Six Nations Cup 2010; Winmau Darts Dazzler Batley 2010
Medal record
Men's Darts
Representing England
WDF World Cup
| Gold medal – first place | 2003 Epinal | Men's overall |
| Gold medal – first place | 2007 Rosmalen | Men's team |
| Gold medal – first place | 2009 Charlotte | Men's singles |
| Gold medal – first place | 2011 Castlebar | Men's pairs |
| Gold medal – first place | 2011 Castlebar | Men's team |
| Gold medal – first place | 2011 Castlebar | Men's overall |
| Gold medal – first place | 2013 St. John's | Men's pairs |
| Gold medal – first place | 2013 St. John's | Men's overall |
| Silver medal – second place | 2003 Epinal | Men's pairs |
| Silver medal – second place | 2003 Epinal | Men's team |
| Silver medal – second place | 2007 Rosmalen | Men's overall |
| Silver medal – second place | 2009 Charlotte | Men's overall |
| Bronze medal – third place | 2005 Perth | Men's overall |
WDF Europe Cup
| Gold medal – first place | 2010 Antalya | Men's overall |
| Silver medal – second place | 2008 Copenhagen | Men's overall |
| Silver medal – second place | 2010 Antalya | Men's pairs |
| Silver medal – second place | 2012 Antalya | Men's team |
| Bronze medal – third place | 2012 Antalya | Men's overall |

Tony O'Shea (born 9 May 1961) is an English professional darts player. His squat figure has resulted in the nickname "Silverback". O'Shea has reached the finals of seven British Darts Organisation (BDO) major darts tournaments, but never won one. He also acted as a regular commentator for televised BDO coverage.

== Darts career ==
=== BDO ===
In 2002, O'Shea made his debut at the BDO World Championship, narrowly losing to former Masters champion Colin Monk 3–2. O'Shea returned the following year and beat former champion Ted Hankey 3–2 in the first round, before once again being beaten by Monk 3–2 – this time in the deciding leg of the deciding set. Two years thereafter he reached the semi-finals after a winning streak defeating Gary Anderson, Gary Robson and Ted Hankey before he eventually went out against Mervyn King 5–1. Later that year he had his best chance to date of winning a major title, as he led King 5–3 in the final of the Winmau World Masters before King recovered to win 6–5.

O'Shea managed to achieve a televised nine-dart finish against Adrian Lewis during the International Darts League on 9 May 2007 which made the tournament the first in darts history to witness two perfect legs. The occasion was made even sweeter as he was celebrating his 46th birthday. In the 2008 World Championship, O'Shea defeated Steve Farmer in the first round, but was defeated by Winmau World Masters champion Robert Thornton in the second round.

O'Shea won the 2008 Welsh Masters, only his second tournament victory. In the 2009 BDO World Championship, O'Shea defeated Anderson in the quarter-finals, his best friend Darryl Fitton in the semi-final, but was once again second-best in a major final as he lost to Hankey 7–6.

O'Shea entered the 2009 Winmau World Masters as the number one seed but despite 3–0 wins over Dave Prins and eighth seed Joey ten Berge, he lost in the semi-finals to defending champion Martin Adams who successfully retained his title. O'Shea then won the WDF World Cup men's singles title with victory over ten Berge in the final.

O'Shea entered the 2010 BDO World Championship as the number one seed. He had a tough first round against World Masters runner up Robbie Green but came through it 3–2. He then saw off Stephen Bunting 4–0 to reach his fourth Quarter-final. He managed a 5–1 victory over Robert Wagner in the quarter finals and went on to meet Dave Chisnall in the semi-final who had beaten Fitton in the first round, former Masters champion Tony West in the second round, and defending champion Hankey in the quarter-final. O'Shea, despite taking the first two sets, was beaten 6–3 by eventual finalist Chisnall.

O'Shea won all three group games in the 2010 Grand Slam of Darts, defeating Vincent van der Voort 5–1, James Wade 5–1 and Justin Pipe 5–4. He then lost 10–7 to Terry Jenkins in the second round.

In contrast in 2010 where he was world number one, O'Shea came into the 2011 BDO World Championship as the number eight seed and suffered a shock first round loss to Ross Smith.

O'Shea was seeded at the 2012 BDO World Championship, O'Shea put his successful run in the tournament down to his work with professional sports mind coach and hypnotherapist Stephen McKibben from Belfast. He beat Steve West in the first round, hitting a 140 checkout and 142 checkout in consecutive legs at the end of the match, before defeating Ross Montgomery in the second round. He then beat defending champion Martin Adams 5–2 in the quarter-finals, hitting a 170 checkout in the fourth set and thanked mind coach Stephen McKibben for enabling him to at last beat Martin Adams in a major tournament. O'Shea followed this up with a 6–5 victory over Dutch débutant Wesley Harms to reach his second World Championship final, where he was defeated by another Dutch débutant, Christian Kist, 7–5.

In October 2012, O'Shea reached his sixth major final at the 2012 Winmau World Masters, and was beaten by Stephen Bunting.

Tony O'Shea reached his third World Championship final in 2013 after a high quality run. He struggled badly in the final, losing to Scott Waites 7–1 with an average of 81.90. O'Shea became the first man to lose his first three BDO World Championship finals, and only the second player to lose his first three world finals in either the BDO or PDC after Peter Manley.

== World Championship results ==
=== BDO ===
- 2002: 1st round (lost to Colin Monk 2–3)
- 2003: 2nd round (lost to Colin Monk 2–3)
- 2004: Semi-final (lost to Mervyn King 1–5)
- 2005: 1st round (lost to Marko Kantele 1–3)
- 2006: Quarter-final (lost to Raymond van Barneveld 3–5)
- 2007: 1st round (lost to Martin Adams 0–3)
- 2008: 2nd round (lost to Robert Thornton 2–4)
- 2009: Runner-up (lost to Ted Hankey 6–7)
- 2010: Semi-final (lost to Dave Chisnall 3–6)
- 2011: 1st round (lost to Ross Smith 1–3)
- 2012: Runner-up (lost to Christian Kist 5–7)
- 2013: Runner-up (lost to Scott Waites 1–7)
- 2014: 1st round (lost to Martin Adams 0–3)
- 2015: 1st round (lost to Scott Mitchell 2–3)
- 2016: 1st round (lost to Jim Williams 0–3)
- 2017: 1st round (lost to Jim Williams 0–3)
- 2019: 1st round (lost to Wesley Harms 2–3)

=== WSDT ===
- 2022: First round (lost to Kevin Painter 2–3)
- 2023: First round (lost to Leonard Gates 0–3)
- 2025: Second round (lost to Derek Coulsen 0–3)

== Career finals ==
=== BDO major finals: 7 (7 runners-up) ===
Legend
World Championship (0–3)
Winmau World Masters (0–2)
World Darts Trophy (0–1)
International Darts League (0–1)

| Outcome | No. | Year | Championship | Opponent in the final | Score (Note: (l) = score in legs, (s) = score in sets.) |
|---|---|---|---|---|---|
| Runner-up | 1. | 2002 | World Darts Trophy | (Australia) Tony David | 0–6 (s) |
| Runner-up | 2. | 2004 | Winmau World Masters | (England) Mervyn King | 6–7 (s) |
| Runner-up | 3. | 2005 | International Darts League | (England) Mervyn King | 11–13 (s) |
| Runner-up | 4. | 2009 | World Championship | (England) Ted Hankey | 6–7 (s) |
| Runner-up | 5. | 2012 | World Championship | (Netherlands) Christian Kist | 5–7 (s) |
| Runner-up | 6. | 2012 | Winmau World Masters | (England) Stephen Bunting | 4–7 (s) |
| Runner-up | 7. | 2013 | World Championship | (England) Scott Waites | 1–7 (s) |

=== WDF major finals: 1 (1 title) ===
| Outcome | No. | Year | Championship | Opponent in the final | Score (Note: (l) = score in legs, (s) = score in sets.) |
|---|---|---|---|---|---|
| Winner | 1. | 2009 | World Cup Singles | (Netherlands) Joey ten Berge | 7–3 (l) |

== Performance timeline ==
| Tournament | 2000 | 2001 | 2002 | 2003 | 2004 | 2005 | 2006 | 2007 | 2008 | 2009 | 2010 | 2011 | 2012 | 2013 | 2014 | 2015 | 2016 | 2017 | 2018 | 2019 |
|---|---|---|---|---|---|---|---|---|---|---|---|---|---|---|---|---|---|---|---|---|
| BDO World Championship | DNP | | 1R | 2R | SF | 1R | QF | 1R | 2R | F | SF | 1R | F | F | 1R | 1R | 1R | 1R | DNQ | 1R |
| BDO World Trophy | Not held | | | | | | | | | | | | | | 1R | 1R | 2R | DNQ | 2R | DNQ |
| International Darts League | Not held | | | QF | RR | F | RR | SF | Not held | | | | | | | | | | | |
| World Darts Trophy | Not held | | F | 1R | QF | 1R | 2R | 1R | Not held | | | | | | | | | | | |
| World Masters | QF | 2R | 2R | 1R | F | 1R | 4R | QF | SF | SF | 6R | 3R | F | 5R | 3R | 1R | 4R | 6R | 2R | DNP |
| Finder Darts Masters | DNP | | SF | SF | QF | RR | NH | RR | SF | RR | SF | RR | QF | QF | SF | QF | RR | DNP | RR | NH |
| Grand Slam of Darts | Not held | | | | | | | DNQ | | QF | 2R | RR | RR | QF | RR | DNQ | | | | |

== Nine-dart finishes ==
Tony O'Shea televised nine-dart finishes
| Date | Opponent | Tournament | Method | Prize |
|---|---|---|---|---|
| 9 May 2007 | (England) Adrian Lewis | International Darts League | 3 x T20; 3 x T20; T20, T19, D12 | Opel Tigra Twin Top |
