= Robert Wagner (darts player) =

Norwegian darts player

Personal information
- Nickname: The Magician
- Born: 14 June 1965 (age 61) Vienna, Austria
- Home town: Oslo, Norway

Sport
- Sport: Darts
- Playing since: 1991
- Darts: 22g DataDart Silver Shadow
- Laterality: Right-handed
- Walk-on music: "Supreme" by Robbie Williams

Organisation (see split in darts)
- BDO: 2001–2012
- PDC: 2013–2022

WDF major events – best performances
- World Championship: Quarter-finals: 2010
- World Masters: Semi-finals: 2008
- World Trophy: Last 16: 2004
- Int. Darts League: Last 16 Group 2003, 2004
- Finder Masters: Last 24 Group: 2003, 2004, 2007, 2009

PDC premier events – best performances
- European Championship: Last 32: 2014

Other tournament wins
- Tournament: Years
- Dortmund Open Finnish Open Norway National Championships SDC Pro Tour SDC Finland: 2010; 2009; 2008, 2009, 2010, 2011, 2012 2012

Robert Wagner (born 14 June 1965) is a former Austrian-born Norwegian professional darts player nicknamed The Magician.

== Career ==
Wagner has played in the Lakeside World Championship four times, reaching the last 16 on three occasions. In 2003, he beat Gary Robson in the first round before going out after losing to Erik Clarys. He beat Co Stompé in the first round in 2004 before losing to John Walton, and in 2005, he put out Jarkko Komula in his first match, but lost to Ted Hankey 3–2 in sets after leading 2–0.

In 2008, Wagner reached the semi-finals of the Dutch Open where he lost to eventual winner Robert Thornton, was runner up in the Finnish Open won by Steve West, and won the Norway National Championship where he beat Rune David in the final.

Wagner reached the semi-finals of the 2008 World Masters, beating Gary Anderson in the last 16 and then beat Joey ten Berge in the quarter-final before losing to Scott Waites.

Wagner played in the 2009 BDO World Championships, losing in the first round to Anderson. He then won the 2009 Finnish Open and retained the Norway National Championship.

Wagner's best run in the World Championship came in 2010. He defeated Alan Norris in the first round 3–1, to face Brian Woods in the second round. Wagner came back from 2–0 and 3–2 behind to win 4–3 in the sudden death leg, three times having to break Woods's throw to stay in the match and seeing Woods miss one dart at bullseye for the match. Both players made a number of high finishes and consistent scoring, and it was very quickly labelled as one of the best matches ever played in the early stage of a World Championship. The win sent Wagner through to the quarter-final for the first time in his career. However, he was unable to replicate his form in the next round and was defeated 5–1 by number 1 seed Tony O'Shea.

Since 2012, Wagner has been competing in PDC-affiliated Scandinavian Darts Corporation (SDC).

== Controversy ==
During a PDC-affiliated SDC event in Vääksy, Finland on 11 August 2012, Wagner was interviewed shortly after beating Finland's Ulf Ceder in the final. In the interview Wagner praised the PDC and openly stated "The BDO is shite", before being reminded by the interviewer to avoid talking about politics.

It is reported that Wagner has been omitted from the 2012 Winmau World Masters and faces a disciplinary hearing.

== World Championship results ==
=== BDO ===
- 2003: 2nd round (lost to Erik Clarys 0–3) (sets)
- 2004: 2nd round (lost to John Walton 1–3)
- 2005: 2nd round (lost to Ted Hankey 2–3)
- 2009: 1st round (lost to Gary Anderson 2–3)
- 2010: Quarter-final (lost to Tony O'Shea 1–5)
