= Anastasia Dobromyslova =

Russian darts player (born 1984)

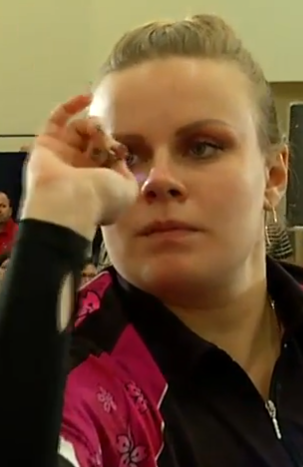
- Dobromyslova in 2016

Personal information
- Full name: Anastasia Petrovna Dobromyslova-Martin
- Nickname: "From Russia with Love"
- Born: 26 September 1984 (age 42) Kalinin, Russian SFSR, Soviet Union
- Home town: Ellesmere Port, England

Sport
- Sport: Darts
- Playing since: 1995
- Darts: 22g Galaxy Barrels Anastasia Dobromyslova
- Laterality: Right-handed
- Walk-on music: "Bring Me to Life" by Evanescence

Organisation (see split in darts)
- BDO: 2001–2008, 2011–2020
- PDC: 2008–2011
- WDF: 2001–2008, 2011–
- Current world ranking: (WDF W) NR (17 August 2026)

WDF major events – best performances
- World Championship: Winner (3): 2008, 2012, 2013
- World Masters: Winner (1): 2014
- World Trophy: Winner (1): 2014
- Finder Masters: Winner (3): 2012, 2014, 2016
- Dutch Open: Winner (2): 2005, 2008

PDC premier events – best performances
- World Championship: Last 70: 2009
- UK Open: Last 128: 2008, 2009
- Grand Slam: Group Stage: 2008, 2009

Other tournament wins
- Tournament: Years
- Antwerp Open BDO International Open Belgium Open British Open England Classic England Masters England Matchplay England National Ch'ships England Open Finnish Open German Open Irish Open Isle of Man Open Mariflex Open Latvia Open Scottish Classic Scottish Open Tops of Ghent WDF Europe Cup Singles Welsh Classic Welsh Open Welsh Masters: 2012, 2014; 2011; 2005; 2006, 2007; 2014; 2011, 2012, 2013, 2014; 2015; 2014; 2007, 2012, 2014; 2004; 2021; 2014; 2013; 2011; 2011; 2014; 2006, 2008, 2014; 2011; 2014; 2012; 2008; 2008, 2014
Medal record
Women's Darts
Representing Russia
EDU European Ch'ship
Gold medal – first place	2011 Benidorm	Women's singles
Gold medal – first place	2013 Geiselwind	Women's singles
Gold medal – first place	2015 Poreč	Women's singles

Anastasia Petrovna Dobromyslova-Martin (Russian: Анастаси́я Петро́вна Добромы́слова; born 26 September 1984) is a professional darts player. She is a three-time Women's World Professional Darts Champion of the British Darts Organisation (BDO).

After winning her first title in 2008, Dobromyslova decided to join the rival male-dominated Professional Darts Corporation (PDC) to play in their World Championship in 2009. After rejoining the BDO in 2011, she won her second World Championship in 2012 and a third in 2013.

Dobromyslova uses the song "Bring Me to Life" by Evanescence. She carries the name From Russia with Love, although she has stated that it is not an official nickname. She is more commonly known as just Anastasia due to the difficulty English-speaking commentators and announcers have pronouncing her surname.

== Career ==
Dobromyslova started to play darts at the age of 12, and has won the Russian National Championship a total of 10 times. According to Dobromyslova, it was quite easy because hardly anyone played the game in Russia. She won the Girls' World Masters title in 2001 and won the WDF Europe Youth Cup singles title in 2001 and 2002.

She made her professional major debut at the 2004 Bavaria World Darts Trophy, where she beat Trina Gulliver in the quarter-final, averaging 90. After beating Mieke de Boer in the semis, she lost to Francis Hoenselaar in the final.

In 2007, Dobromyslova made her debut in the BDO World Championship at Lakeside, as the number 4 seed, reaching the semi-finals. After beating Sweden's Carina Ekberg in the quarter-finals, she fell to eventual winner, Trina Gulliver. During the year, she won the England Open and the British Open, amongst several other singles titles across Europe. In October, she represented Russia in the 2007 WDF World Cup in the Netherlands, and won the ladies' pairs title with Irina Armstrong.

In 2008, she returned to Lakeside, again as the number 4 seed, for the World Championship. She defeated Dee Bateman in the first round and Stephanie Smee in the semi-finals, before defeating Trina Gulliver in the final by two sets to nil, ending Gulliver's seven-year unbeaten run as world champion.

Dobromyslova made headlines when she qualified for the 2008 UK Open, a PDC major tournament, by winning through the Pub Qualifiers event, beating Darren Place 5–2 and Pete Galloway 5–0. In the first round, she was drawn to play Robert Thornton, who was also a BDO player who won through the Pub Qualifiers, and was the reigning World Masters champion. Thornton narrowly won 6–5.

She was named the number one seed for the 2008 Zuiderduin Masters, but was excluded from playing by the Dutch authorities after problems with her visa, and was forced to withdraw. She was replaced by Lisa Ashton.

Dobromyslova received an invitation from the PDC to play in the 2008 Grand Slam of Darts, as BDO Ladies' world champion. It was the first time a female darts player was invited to play at the Grand Slam. In her group, she was drawn with reigning PDC world champion John Part, Kevin McDine, and Wayne Mardle. After losing her opening match 5–1 to Part, she gave Mardle a scare when she came from 4–0 to take four consecutive legs, including a Shanghai 120 checkout and a 116, before Mardle won the deciding leg. A third defeat occurred when she lost 5–2 to McDine.

In December, she went into the 2008 World Masters as the number one ranked ladies' darts player, and reached the final, where she lost to Hoenselaar. Just a few hours later, however, it was announced that Dobromyslova had left the WDF/BDO circuit, and had joined the PDC on a full-time basis, after she was awarded a wildcard entry into the 2009 PDC World Darts Championship following the withdrawal of an unnamed Indian qualifier, a decision that was publicly criticised by five-time world champion Eric Bristow.

Dobromyslova became the second female player to play in a men's world darts championship, after Canadian Gayl King played in the 2001 event. She was drawn in the preliminary round against Remco van Eijden, and lost 5 legs to 3.

She qualified again for the UK Open in 2009, this time through her UK Open Order of Merit ranking, having won £500 in seven qualifying events. She played amateur qualifier Andy Roberts in the first round and lost 6–2.

Following their failed takeover bid of the BDO, the PDC introduced their own Women's World Championship, and Dobromyslova automatically qualified as the only female member of the PDPA. She lost in the semi-finals to Stacy Bromberg, who went on the beat Tricia Wright in the final.

At the 2009 Grand Slam of Darts, Dobromyslova was drawn with Phil Taylor, Vincent van der Voort, and Mark Webster. After suffering a 5–0 whitewash from Taylor in her first group match, Dobromyslova defeated van der Voort 5–4. It was her first ever win against a man on television, and made her only the second woman to beat a male professional darts player in a major televised darts competition, the first being Deta Hedman's defeats of Aaron Turner and Norman Fletcher in the 2005 UK Open. She still finished bottom of the group, however, as van der Voort unexpectedly beat Taylor 5–1 two days later, whilst she lost her last group game to Webster 5–2.

Dobromyslova failed to qualify for the PDC World Championship in 2010 and 2011, despite entering the Russian PDC qualifying events. In the 2010 qualifier, she lost in the final to Roman Konchikov, and she lost again in the final, to Andrei Ratnikov in the 2011 event. Ratnikov later withdrew from the competition after he was unable to travel to England for family reasons. PDC awarded his preliminary round place to the runner-up of the PDPA qualifying event (which later turned out to be Matt Padgett), rather than Dobromyslova.

Dobromyslova represented Russia in the first ever PDC World Cup of Darts along with Konchikov. The pair beat Gibraltar, paired by Dylan Duo and Dyson Parody, in the first round, before losing to Scotland's Gary Anderson and Robert Thornton.

On 24 December 2010, it was rumoured amongst several darts internet forums that Dobromyslova had resigned from the PDC and returned to play in BDO and WDF events. On 1 January 2011, during the BBC's broadcast of the 2011 BDO World Darts Championship, commentator David Croft announced that Dobromyslova was indeed returning to play in the BDO circuit. Anastasia herself confirmed over a week later, via her Twitter page, that she had left the PDC and was preparing for the Dutch Open. She later said she moved back to the BDO for monetary reasons.

She qualified for the 2012 BDO World Darts Championship, where in the quarter-final, she defeated second seeded Welsh woman Julie Gore by two sets to nil. In the semi-finals, she defeated third seed and title holder Trina Gulliver again by two sets to nil. Dobromyslova then recovered from losing the first set and needing to break her opponent Deta Hedman's throw to stay in the match to win her second world championship two sets to one.

In 2013 Dobromyslova won her third World title after beating Lisa Ashton 2–1 in sets.

=== Soft tip darts ===
Dobromyslova also plays soft tip darts competitively, as well as steel-tip darts, having represented Russia at the International Darts Federation (IDF) World Cup and European Darts Union (EDU) European Championship. She is a former world and European champion in the sport.

She became the 2011 European singles champion in Benidorm. At the IDF World Cup in 2011, Dobromyslova won the Pro Singles Cricket event, but lost the Pro Singles (501) event final, and also won the Pro Mixed Pairs event.

Dobromyslova became European champion again in 2012. At the 2012 IDF World Cup, Dobromyslova beat Stacy Bromberg to win the Pro Singles (501) event. It meant she became the first woman to become the soft-tip and steel-tip (501) world darts champion in the same year. She lost the Pro Cricket Singles event final to Bromberg, but won the team event with Russia. Russia became the first European team to win the team event.

== World Championship results ==
=== PDC ===
- 2009: Preliminary Round (lost to Remco van Eijden 3–5)
- 2010: Semi-finals (lost 3-4 (l) to Stacy Bromberg) (Women's only tournament)
- 2019: First Round (lost to Ryan Joyce 0–3)

=== BDO ===
- 2007: Semi-final (lost to Trina Gulliver 0–2)
- 2008: Winner (beat Trina Gulliver 2–0)
- 2012: Winner (beat Deta Hedman 2–1)
- 2013: Winner (beat Lisa Ashton 2–1)
- 2014: Semi-final (lost to Lisa Ashton 1–2)
- 2015: Semi-final (lost to Fallon Sherrock 1–2)
- 2016: First round (lost to Anca Zijlstra 1–2)
- 2017: Semi-final (lost to Corrine Hammond 0–2)
- 2018: Runner-up (lost to Lisa Ashton 1–3)
- 2019: Semi-final (lost to Lorraine Winstanley 1–2)
- 2020: Quarter-final (lost to Mikuru Suzuki 0–2)

== Career finals ==
=== WDF / BDO major youth finals: 4 (3 titles, 1 runner-up) ===
Legend
Winmau World Masters (1–1)
WDF Europe Youth Cup (2–0)

Outcome	No.	Year	Championship	Opponent in the final	Score (Note: (l) = score in legs, (s) = score in sets.)
Runner-up	1.	2000	Winmau World Masters	(Wales) Janine Gough	0–3 (l)
Winner	2.	2001	Winmau World Masters (1)	(Netherlands) Jeannett Thomassen	3–1 (l)
Winner	3.	2001	WDF Europe Youth Cup Singles (1)	Unknown	Unknown
Winner	4.	2002	WDF Europe Youth Cup Singles (2)	Unknown	Unknown

=== WDF major youth team finals: 1 (1 title) ===
Outcome	No.	Year	Championship	Opponents in the final	Score
Winner	1.	1999	Europe Youth Cup Pairs (1) with (Russia) Anastasia Borissova	Unknown	Unknown

=== WDF / BDO major finals: 18 (9 titles, 9 runners-up) ===
Legend
World Championship (3–1)
Winmau World Masters (1–2)
World Darts Trophy (0–1)
Zuiderduin Masters (3–2)
BDO World Trophy (1–3)
WDF Europe Cup (1–0)

Outcome	No.	Year	Championship	Opponent in the final	Score
Runner-up	1.	2004	World Darts Trophy	(Netherlands) Francis Hoenselaar	1–3 (s)
Winner	2.	2008	World Darts Championship (1)	(England) Trina Gulliver	2–0 (s)
Runner-up	3.	2008	Winmau World Masters	(Netherlands) Francis Hoenselaar	3–4 (l)
Winner	4.	2012	World Darts Championship (2)	(England) Deta Hedman	2–1 (s)
Winner	5.	2012	Zuiderduin Masters (1)	(Netherlands) Aileen de Graaf	2–1 (s)
Winner	6.	2013	World Darts Championship (3)	(England) Lisa Ashton	2–1 (s)
Runner-up	7.	2013	Zuiderduin Masters	(Netherlands) Aileen de Graaf	0–2 (s)
Winner	8.	2014	World Winmau Masters (1)	(England) Fallon Sherrock	4–1 (l)
Winner	9.	2014	BDO World Trophy (1)	(England) Lisa Ashton	9–7 (l)
Winner	10.	2014	Zuiderduin Masters (2)	(Netherlands) Aileen de Graaf	2–1 (s)
Winner	11.	2014	WDF Europe Cup Singles (1)	(England) Deta Hedman	7–5 (l)
Runner-up	12.	2015	BDO World Trophy	(England) Lisa Ashton	5–7 (l)
Runner-up	13.	2015	Zuiderduin Masters	(England) Fallon Sherrock	0–2 (s)
Winner	14.	2016	Zuiderduin Masters (3)	(Netherlands) Aileen de Graaf	2–1 (s)
Runner-up	15.	2017	BDO World Trophy	(Netherlands) Aileen de Graaf	2–6 (l)
Runner-up	16.	2018	World Darts Championship	(England) Lisa Ashton	1–3 (s)
Runner-up	17.	2019	BDO World Trophy	(England) Lisa Ashton	2–6 (l)
Runner-up	18.	2019	Winmau World Masters	(England) Lisa Ashton	4–5 (l)

=== WDF major team finals: 1 (1 title) ===
Outcome	No.	Year	Championship	Opponents in the final	Score
Winner	1.	2007	World Cup Pairs (1) with (Russia) Irina Armstrong	(Sweden) Maud Jansson (Sweden) Carina Ekberg	4–2 (l)

== Performance timeline ==
WDF

Tournament	2002	2003	2004	2006	2007	2014	2017
WDF World Cup Singles	NH	QF	NH	NH	L64	NH	SF
WDF World Cup Pairs	NH	RR	NH		W	DNP	W
WDF Europe Cup Singles	SF	NH	L16	L32	NH	W	NH
WDF Europe Cup Pairs	QF	NH	RR	RR	NH	L16	NH

BDO

Tournament	2004	2005	2006	2007	2008	2011	2012	2013	2014	2015	2016	2017	2018	2019	2020
BDO Ranked televised events
BDO World Championship	Did not play			SF	W	DNP	W	W	SF	SF	1R	SF	F	SF	QF
Winmau World Masters	DNP	L16	QF	DNP	F	DNP	L64	L64	W	QF	QF	QF	SF	F	NH
BDO World Trophy	NH								W	F	SF	F	SF	F	NH
Zuiderduin Masters	Not held				DNP	RR	W	F	W	F	W	RR	DNP	NH	
World Darts Trophy	F	QF	Not held												

PDC

Tournament	2008	2009	2010	2019	2024
PDC Ranked televised events
World Championship	DNP	1R	DNP	1R	DNQ
UK Open	1R	1R	Did not qualify		
Grand Slam of Darts	RR	RR	Did not qualify		
PDC Non-ranked televised events
PDC World Cup of Darts	NH	2R	Did not participate		
Women's World Championship	NH		SF	Not held	
Women's World Matchplay	Not held				QF

Performance Table Legend
W	Won the tournament	F	Finalist	SF	Semifinalist	QF	Quarterfinalist	#R; RR; L#	Lost in # round Round-robin; Last # stage	DQ	Disqualified
DNQ	Did not qualify	DNP	Did not participate	WD	Withdrew	NH	Tournament not held	#R; RR; L#	Lost in # round Round-robin; Last # stage	NYF	Not yet founded

== Personal life ==
Dobromyslova is married to Tony Martin, who qualified for the 2005 BDO World Darts Championship and resides in Ellesmere Port, Cheshire, England. Their first child, a son called Joseph, was born in February 2017.

She is the first and the only darts player to date to be awarded the honorary title "Merited Master of Sport of Russia".
