= Co Stompé =

Dutch darts player (born 1962)

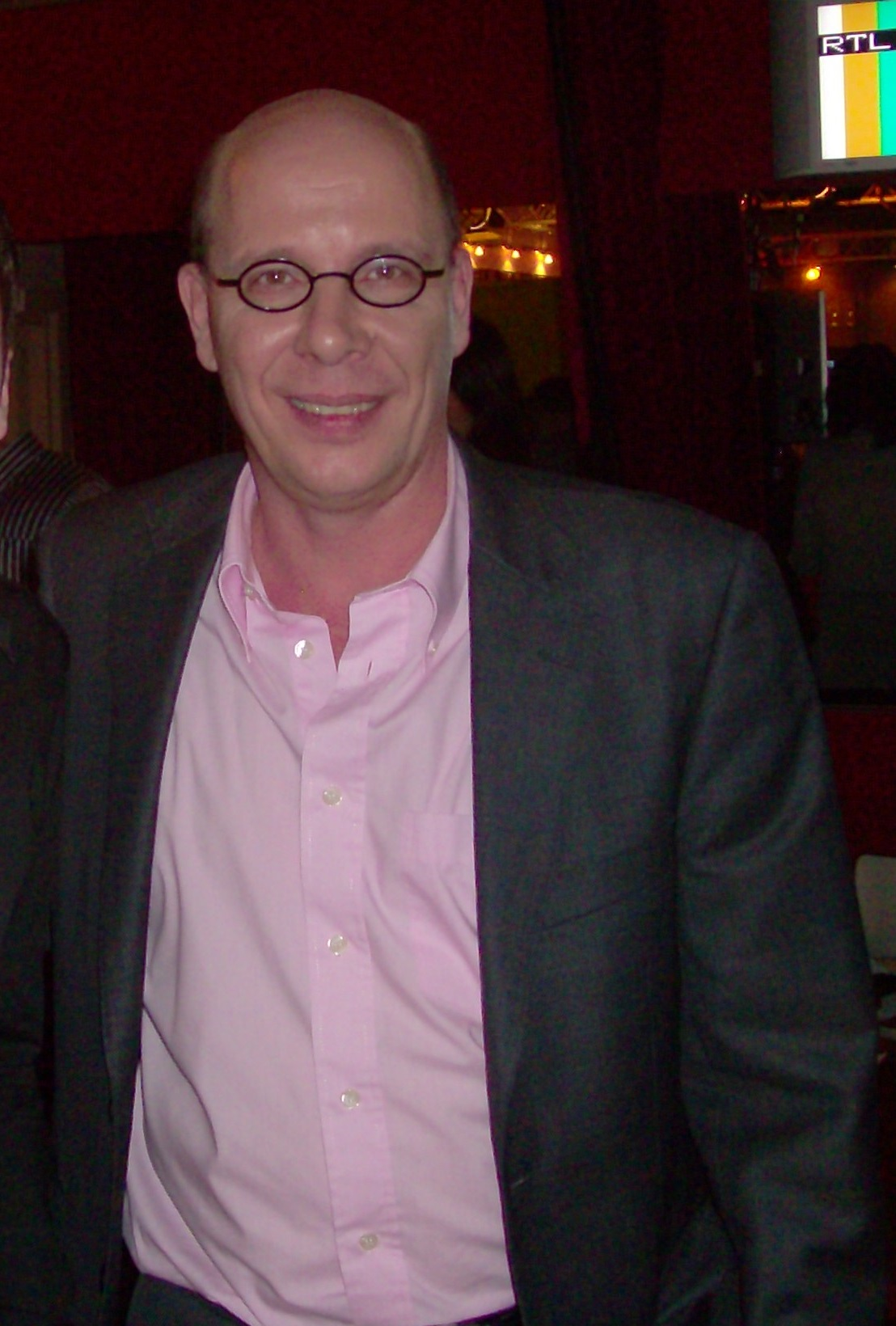
- Stompé in 2011

Personal information
- Full name: Jacobus Wilhelmus Stompé
- Nickname: The Matchstick
- Born: 10 September 1962 (age 64) Amsterdam, Netherlands
- Home town: Lelystad, Netherlands

Sport
- Sport: Darts
- Playing since: 1988
- Darts: 23g Bull's Signature
- Laterality: Right-handed
- Walk-on music: "Kung Fu Fighting" by Carl Douglas

Organisation (see split in darts)
- BDO: 1994–2008, 2014–2015
- PDC: 2008–2013

WDF major events – best performances
- World Championship: Semi-final: 2000
- World Masters: Quarter-final: 2000, 2006
- World Trophy: Last 16: 2002, 2004
- Int. Darts League: Quarter-final: 2005
- Finder Masters: Semi-final: 2001, 2004

PDC premier events – best performances
- World Championship: Quarter-final: 2009, 2010
- World Matchplay: Quarter-final: 2010
- World Grand Prix: Last 32: 2010
- UK Open: Last 32: 2011
- Grand Slam: Quarter-final: 2010
- European Championship: Last 32: 2009, 2010, 2011, 2012
- Desert Classic: Last 16: 2009
- PC Finals: Last 16: 2011

WSDT major events – best performances
- World Championship: Last 32: 2023

Other tournament wins
- Years
Belgium Open	2000
British Classic	2007
British Pentathlon	2007
Finnish Open	2003
German Darts Championship	2008
Open Holland	2001
PDC World Cup of Darts	2010
Spring Cup	1996, 1997
Swiss Open	2007
WDF Europe Cup Singles	1998
WDF Europe Cup Pairs	2000
WDF Europe Cup Team	2006
Westerlaan Darts Gala	2010
Players Championships (x1)
2010

Other achievements
- 9 Dart Finish: UK Open Qualifier 2010
- Updated on 31 March 2019

Jacobus Wilhelmus "Co" Stompé (born 10 September 1962) is a Dutch former professional darts player. He was nicknamed the Matchstick because of his almost bald head and very thin appearance. He was also one of the very few darts professionals who played in long sleeved shirts.

== Darts career ==
=== BDO ===
For years, Stompé was considered the third best Dutch darts player behind Raymond van Barneveld and Roland Scholten. After reaching the semi-finals of the 2000 World Championship, he dropped back behind a younger emerging Dutch group of players.

Stompé came back to fame with the defeat of reigning BDO champion Jelle Klaasen in the first round of the 2007 World Championship.

Towards the end of his BDO career, Stompé also acted as a darts commentator for Dutch commercial television station SBS6.

=== PDC ===
On 11 June 2008 it was announced that Stompé had joined the Professional Darts Corporation circuit, and had to join the PDC rankings at 227. He made his PDC debut in the two PDPA Players Championship tournaments in Bristol. The first tournament started with a bye into the last 64, due to van Barneveld not taking part. He lost to Matt Clark. The next day saw him beat Tony Ayres and Peter Manley before losing in the last 32 stage to Kirk Shepherd.

He then qualified for the 2008 Las Vegas Desert Classic but lost in the first round to Dennis Priestley.

Stompé won the 2008 PDC German Darts Championship, beating Phil Taylor 4–2 in the final. Both players averaged well in excess of 100; Stompé averaged 107.28, while Taylor averaged 108.09. The win earned him a spot in the 2009 Grand Slam of Darts and also earned him a place in the 2009 World Championship qualifying through the Continental Europe Order of Merit. He originally qualified through Dutch broadcaster SBS6's wildcard place which then went to Remco van Eijden as a result. He defeated 2007 semi-finalist Andy Jenkins in the first round. He also defeated Alan Tabern, the ninth seed in the second round and his impressive form in the championship continued with a 4–0 win over eighth seed Wayne Mardle in the third round. The win set up a quarter final encounter with Taylor, losing 5–0.

Stompé then qualified for the Desert Classic for the second successive year. He defeated Colin Osborne in the first round but lost in round two to Raymond van Barneveld. He then suffered first round losses in the World Matchplay to Adrian Lewis and in the European Championship to Gary Anderson and also went out at the group stage of the Grand Slam of Darts. His defence of the German Darts Championship ended in the last 32 with a loss to Ronnie Baxter.

At the 2010 World Championship, Stompé defeated Steve Maish, Mervyn King and Mark Dudbridge to reach the quarter finals once more but was defeated by Mark Webster. He then reached the quarter finals of the 2010 World Matchplay, defeating Andy Hamilton and Mark Webster before losing to Raymond van Barneveld.

On 18 October that year, Stompé broke into the PDC Top 16 for the first time, dropping out three weeks later. In December, he partnered van Barneveld in the Netherlands team which won the inaugural PDC World Cup of Darts. Later that month, Stompé was knocked out of the 2011 World Championship in the first round, losing 1–3 to Peter Wright. Stompé comfortably beat Michael Smith 3–0 in the first round of the 2012 World Championship. He was bitten by a dog over the Christmas period and couldn't replicate the form he showed days earlier as he lost 1–4 in the second round to Terry Jenkins, hitting just 28% of his doubles. 2012 proved to be a disappointing year for Stompé as he could not reach a single quarter-final out of the 25 tournaments he played, with his best finishes being last 16 defeats in Pro Tour events.

Stompé dropped out of the top 32 during 2012, but qualified for the 2013 World Championship by finishing fifth on the European Order of Merit, taking the first of four spots for non-qualified players. He lost 0–3 to Paul Nicholson in the first round. After the tournament he was world ranked number 40. Stompé lost 5–4 to Michael Mansell in the second round of the UK Open. He only played in four more events during the rest of the year with his final PDC tournament coming in September.

=== BDO return ===
Stompe returned to the BDO in 2014. He made his return to high-profile televised BDO tournaments at the Zuiderduin Masters.

=== PDC return ===
In December 2017, RTL 7 announced that Stompé would take part in qualifying school in early 2018 in an attempt to regain his tour card, he postponed this attempted stating at the time that he had had 'too many other things on his mind', along with his son Co Stompe Jnr he attempted to win a tour card in 2019, neither of them were able to do so.

== Personal life ==
Co is married to his second wife Danielle. He proposed to her on stage after winning the WDF World Cup with the Netherlands. Stompé's son, also called Co (born 1991), plays on the PDC Youth Tour, and reached the final of an event in Crawley in May 2011. Stompe has "adopted" Portsmouth as his football team, due to the support he has received from fans.

Stompé and his wife were found guilty of taxation fraud in 2017. They received work sentences of 150 and 190 hours of work for tax fraud respectively. The court in Almelo considered forgery of documents and the deliberate submission of incorrect declarations for turnover and income tax for the years 2009 through 2013 to have been proven. The couple also received a conditional prison sentence of three months. The fraud was estimated to be more than 100,000 euros.

== World Championship results ==
=== BDO ===
- 1996: 1st round (lost to Steve Beaton 0–3)
- 1998: 1st round (lost to Roland Scholten 2–3)
- 1999: 2nd round (lost to Roland Scholten 2–3)
- 2000: Semi-finalist (lost to Ronnie Baxter 2–5)
- 2001: 2nd round (lost to Wayne Mardle 0–3)
- 2002: 2nd round (lost to Bob Taylor 2–3)
- 2003: 1st round (lost to Martin Adams 1–3)
- 2004: 1st round (lost to Robert Wagner 2–3)
- 2005: 1st round (lost to André Brantjes 2–3)
- 2006: 1st round (lost to Paul Hanvidge 1–3)
- 2007: 2nd round (lost to Martin Adams 1–4)
- 2008: 2nd round (lost to Brian Woods 2–4)

=== PDC ===
- 2009: Quarter-finalist (lost to Phil Taylor 0–5)
- 2010: Quarter-finalist (lost to Mark Webster 3–5)
- 2011: 1st round (lost to Peter Wright 1–3)
- 2012: 2nd round (lost to Terry Jenkins 1–4)
- 2013: 1st round (lost to Paul Nicholson 0–3)

=== WSDT ===
- 2023: 1st round (lost to John Part 2–3)

== Career finals ==
=== WDF major finals: 1 (1 title) ===
Outcome	No.	Year	Championship	Opponent in the final	Score (Note: (l) = score in legs, (s) = score in sets, (p) = score in points.)
Winner	1.	1998	Europe Cup Singles	(England) Andy Fordham	4–2 (s)

=== PDC team finals: 1 (1 title) ===
Outcome	No.	Year	Championship	Team	Teammate	Opponents in the final	Score
Winner	1.	2010	World Cup of Darts	Netherlands	Raymond van Barneveld	Wales – Mark Webster and Barrie Bates	4–2 (p)

=== WDF team finals: 4 (1 title, 3 runner-up) ===
Legend
World Cup (1–2)
Europe Cup (1–2)

Outcome	No.	Year	Championship	Teammate(s)	Opponents in the final	Score
Winner	1.	2000	Europe Cup Pairs	(Netherlands) Raymond van Barneveld	(England) Ted Hankey (England) Mervyn King	4–3 (l)
Runner-up	1.	2000	Europe Cup Team	(Netherlands) Raymond van Barneveld (Netherlands) Frans Harmsen (Netherlands) Arjan Moen	(England) Kevin Painter (England) Mervyn King (England) Martin Adams (England) Ted Hankey	3–9 (l)
Runner-up	2.	2002	Europe Cup Team	(Netherlands) Raymond van Barneveld (Netherlands) Vincent van der Voort (Netherlands) Albertino Essers	(Scotland) Peter Johnstone (Scotland) Gary Anderson (Scotland) George Dalglish (Scotland) Mike Veitch	8–9 (l)
Runner-up	3.	2003	World Cup Team	(Netherlands) Raymond van Barneveld (Netherlands) Albertino Essers (Netherlands) Vincent van der Voort	(United States) Ray Carver (United States) John Kuczynski (United States) Bill Davis (United States) George Walls	7–9 (l)
Winner	3.	2006	Europe Cup Team	(Netherlands) Jelle Klaasen (Netherlands) Vincent van der Voort (Netherlands) Niels de Ruiter	(Scotland) Gary Anderson (Scotland) Mike Veitch (Scotland) Paul Hanvidge (Scotland) Paul McGimpsey	9–2 (l)

== Career statistics ==
Performance Table Legend
W	Won the tournament	F	Finalist	SF	Semifinalist	QF	Quarterfinalist	#R; RR; Prel.	Lost in # round Round-robin; Preliminary round	DQ	Disqualified
DNQ	Did not qualify	DNP	Did not participate	WD	Withdrew	NH	Tournament not held	#R; RR; Prel.	Lost in # round Round-robin; Preliminary round	NYF	Not yet founded

=== Performance timeline ===
BDO

Tournament	1993	1994	1995	1996	1997	1998	1999	2000	2001	2002	2003	2004	2005	2006	2007	2008	2014
BDO Ranked televised events
BDO World Championship	DNQ			1R	DNQ	1R	2R	SF	2R	2R	1R	1R	1R	1R	2R	2R	PDC
International Darts League	Not held										RR	RR	QF	RR	RR	NH	
World Darts Trophy	Not held									2R	1R	2R	1R	1R	1R	NH	
World Masters	2R	DNQ	1R	4R	1R	4R	4R	QF	2R	1R	4R	4R	2R	QF	6R	DNP	1R
Zuiderduin Masters	Not held							QF	SF	RR	RR	SF	RR	NH	QF	DNP	RR

PDC

Tournament	2005	2008	2009	2010	2011		2012	2013
PDC Ranked televised events
PDC World Championship	DNP		QF	QF	1R		2R	1R
UK Open	DNP	DNQ	3R	3R	4R		2R	2R
World Matchplay	DNP	DNQ	1R	QF	DNQ			
World Grand Prix	DNP	DNQ		1R	DNQ			
European Championship	NH	DNQ	1R	1R	1R		1R	DNQ
Players Championship Finals	Not held		DNQ	1R	1R	2R	DNQ	
PDC Non-ranked televised events
World Cup	Not held			W	NH		DNP	
Grand Slam of Darts	NH	DNQ	RR	QF	RR		RR	DNQ
PDC Past major events
Las Vegas Desert Classic	DNP	1R	2R	Not held				
Masters of Darts	RR	NH	DNP	Not held				
Career statistics
Year-end ranking	NR	41	28	17	22		40	51
