= Stacy Bromberg =

American darts player (1956–2017)

Personal information
- Nickname: "The Wish Granter"
- Born: July 27, 1956 Los Angeles, California, U.S.
- Died: February 12, 2017 (aged 60) Las Vegas Valley, U.S.

Sport
- Sport: Darts
- Playing since: 1979
- Darts: 26g LaserDarts
- Laterality: Right-handed
- Walk-on music: American Girl by Tom Petty and the Heartbreakers

Organisation (see split in darts)
- BDO: 1995–2006
- PDC: 2007–2012

WDF major events – best performances
- World Championship: Quarter Final: 2002
- World Masters: Runner Up: 1995

PDC premier events – best performances
- World Championship: (Women's) Winner (1) 2010
- Grand Slam: Group Stage: 2010
- Desert Classic: (Women's) Winner (1) 2003
- US Open/WSoD: Last 128: 2007, 2010

Stacy Bromberg (July 27, 1956 – February 12, 2017) was an American darts player who was a PDC Women's World Darts Champion. Bromberg was born in Los Angeles, and dominated the American darts circuit in the last decade through winning the US women's championship on 11 occasions.

== Career ==
Bromberg won the North American Open in 1995 and reached the final of the 1995 Women's World Masters, losing to England's Sharon Colclough. In 2002, she qualified for the BDO Women's World Darts Championship but lost two sets to nil to Francis Hoenselaar of the Netherlands. She then won the 2003 Women's Las Vegas Desert Classic in her hometown of Las Vegas, defeating Deta Hedman six legs to four in the final. She then reached the final in 2004 but lost to Trina Gulliver 6–5.

2009 was a banner year with Stacy winning the WDF World Cup Women's Singles Championship in Charlotte, North Carolina (USA) with steel tip darts and the Shanghai Women's Singles Champion with soft tip darts. She became the first ever PDC Women's World Champion, after defeating Tricia Wright 6–5 in the final. She had earlier defeated Russian former world ladies champion Anastasia Dobromyslova in the semi-finals.

As a result of winning the PDC Women's World Championship, Bromberg qualified for the 2010 Grand Slam of Darts, where she lost all three group games to Mervyn King, John Henderson, and Terry Jenkins

As the PDC Women's World Champion Stacy was a special guest of the PDC at many PDC events including week three of the 888.com Premier League Darts at the Odyssey Arena in Belfast as well as several Players' Championships. Since 2011 she was recognized by the BDO and was ranked 106 in the BDO invitation women. She turned down several invitations by the ADO to compete in their National competitions due to their decision, along with the WDF, to disqualify her from defending her World title in Dublin, Ireland, because she competed in 4 PDC events the prior year.

As a member of the American Darts Organization (ADO) Stacy was the #1 ranked women's player a record 16 times (13 in a row), National Team Member 12 times, National Champion-Ladies 501 11 times, National Champion-Ladies Cricket 4 times, the 1st player with 1000+ championship points in one year, and the Ladies National Points Winner 15 times. She was also a member of the US team competing in the WDF World Cup competition a total of 8 times winning 4 gold medals (including the one in 2009 as the World Cup Ladies Singles Champion), a member of the US America's Cup competition 3 times and BDO World Master's US Team Member 8 times.

== Personal life and death ==
Originally from Los Angeles, Bromberg lived in Las Vegas. She was a fan of the Oakland Raiders and got her nickname The Wish Granter from her work in various charities, particularly Make-A-Wish Foundation. She made her full-time living as a private detective although she gave it up, when she came to prominence after winning the inaugural PDC Women's World Championship. She then taught as a substitute teacher with the Clark County School District until a cancer diagnosis in 2012 and 2013 rendered her unable to teach.

Following numerous battles with cancer, Bromberg died at her home in Las Vegas, aged 60, on February 12, 2017.

== World Championship results ==
=== BDO ===
- 2002: Quarter Finals (lost to Francis Hoenselaar 0–2)

=== PDC ===
- 2010: Winner (beat Tricia Wright 6–5)

== Career finals ==
=== BDO major finals: 1 (1 runner-up) ===
Outcome	No.	Year	Championship	Opponent in the final	Score (Note: (l) = score in legs, (s) = score in sets.)
Runner-up	1.	1995	World Masters	(England) Sharon Colclough	1–3 (s)

=== PDC premier event finals: 2 (2 titles) ===
Legend
World Championship (1–0)
Other (1–0)

Outcome	No.	Year	Championship	Opponent in the final	Score
Winner	1.	2003	Las Vegas Desert Classic	(England) Deta Hedman	6–4 (l)
Winner	2.	2010	Women's World Darts Championship	(England) Tricia Wright	6-5 (s)
