= 2007 in darts =

This is a list of some of the major events and competitions in the sport of darts in 2007. Raymond van Barneveld proved to be the most successful player with ten professional tournament wins across the PDC and BDO, including four majors.

== News ==
=== January ===
- 1 – Raymond van Barneveld battles from 3 sets to 0 down to win his first PDC Title and fifth world title overall 7–6 in the sudden-death leg versus Phil Taylor who maintains his record of reaching every single PDC World Championship final to date.
- 6 – van Barneveld follows up his World title success by winning the North-East Regional Final of the Blue Square UK Open (the fourth of eight regional finals). He beat Roland Scholten in the final to claim the £5,000 first prize.
- 6 – the 2007 BDO World Championship gets underway at Lakeside. Defending champion, Jelle Klaasen is knocked out in the first round by fellow Dutchman, Co Stompé.
- 8 – Former World Champion, Andy Fordham is taken ill before his first round match against Simon Whitlock. Fordham was taken to hospital after suffered breathing difficulties as a result of a chest infection.
- 9 – Phil Taylor is the first winner of the PDC Player of the Year Award. Phil Jones and John Raby are inducted into the PDC Hall of Fame. Other awards: Best Newcomer & the Fans' Player of the Year Raymond van Barneveld. PDPA Player of the Year Dennis Priestley. Young player of the year James Wade. Best Floor Player Barrie Bates.
- 14 – Three more Dutch players announce their move to the PDC. Vincent van der Voort, Michael van Gerwen and Jelle Klaasen announced this prior to the BDO World Darts Championship final.
- 14 – Martin Adams finally ends his World Championship drought by claiming the 2007 BDO World Darts Championship title – at his 14th attempt. In the final, he led 6–0 and looked to be coasting to victory before Phill Nixon produced an astonishing comeback to level at 6–6. Adams held his nerve to clinch the final set.
- 16 – Adrian Lewis is confirmed as the final wildcard entrant for the 2007 Holsten Premier League to complete the line-up of eight players.
- 20 – Raymond van Barneveld extends his PDC winning streak to 20 matches by claiming the first of the weekend's two Stan James Players Championship in Gibraltar beating Adrian Lewis in the final. Michael van Gerwen and Vincent van der Voort made their PDC debuts at this event reaching the last 16. Jelle Klaasen reached the last 32.
- 21 – Michael van Gerwen becomes the first player to beat Raymond van Barneveld since his world title win ending his run of successive victories at 21 matches. Van Gerwen was also the last player to beat van Barneveld back in November. He lost in the quarter-finals to Alan Warriner-Little. Andy Hamilton won his first PDC pro tour title with a final win over Colin Lloyd.
- 27 – Tony Eccles wins the German Gold Cup in Bremen beating Dutchman Remco van Eijden by 3 sets to 1 to claim the €700 first prize. Heike Ernst beat Thea Kaaijk to take the women's title.
- 28 – Chris White wins the Las Vegas Open, a category two BDO event beating John Kuczynski in the final. John Part and Wes Newton teamed up to win the pairs events and also the cricket doubles. The women's title was won by Stacy Bromberg.

=== February ===
- 1 – The Holsten Premier League gets underway with wins for Raymond van Barneveld, Dennis Priestley and Peter Manley. Phil Taylor was on the verge of his first ever Premier League defeat but extended his unbeaten run to 29 matches with a 7–7 draw against Roland Scholten.
- 3 – Kevin Painter wins the non-ranking PDC event JR 128 Plus tournament in Eastbourne defeating Wes Newton 5–4 in the final.
- 3 – John Markovic, former manager of Bob Anderson and Richie Gardner dies following a long illness. The Serbian-born businessman also contributed to the formation of the WDC (now the PDC) in 1992.
- 4 – Scott Waites, from Yorkshire, wins the BDO Dutch Open (his first major title) in Veldhoven – coming through a field of 2867 players to win the €4,500 first prize. Trina Gulliver took the women's singles title.
- 4 – Dennis Smith claimed the PDC Eastbourne Open title with a victory over Shayne Burgess.
- 6 – Mervyn King announces that he is following his stablemates Klaasen, van Gerwen and van der Voort by switching to the PDC. The BDO consider taking legal action as King (along with Klaasen) have signed contracts to play in the 2008 BDO World Championship.
- 8 – Phil Taylor is held to a draw for the second week running in the Premier League this time by Dennis Priestley. Raymond van Barneveld maintains his 100% record and there were first victories in the league for Terry Jenkins and Adrian Lewis.
- 10 – The Masters of Darts gets underway in the Netherlands with two upsets – Michael van Gerwen defeats Phil Taylor and Peter Manley beats PDC World Champion Raymond van Barneveld. England players won four matches to Netherlands one on the opening day.
- 10 – More PDC switches are announced as Dutch teenager Toon Greebe (quarter finalist at the previous week's Dutch Open) and Tony Martin confirm they will be joining the PDC circuit.
- 11 – Dennis Priestley wins the South-West regional final of the Blue Square UK Open beating James Wade in the final 2–0 and takes the £5,000 top prize.
- 14 – The Group stages of the Masters of Darts conclude with Raymond van Barneveld winning the Dutch Group and Peter Manley winning all five matches to clinch the England Group. Phil Taylor surprisingly finishes bottom of the England table with three defeats.
- 15 – Dennis Priestley goes top of the Premier League with a victory over Roland Scholten. Phil Taylor notches his first win of the season and Raymond van Barneveld is held to a draw by in-form Peter Manley.
- 17 – Michael van Gerwen achieves a nine dart finish during the semi-finals of the Masters of Darts, the youngest player to achieve the feat on television. However, he lost the match to Raymond van Barneveld who will meet Peter Manley in the final.
- 18 – Raymond van Barneveld maintains his superb start to 2007 winning his third major title of the year. He beats Peter Manley 7–0 with a 108 average in the final to win the Keukenconcurrent Masters of Darts at the ExpoCentre, Hengelo, Netherlands.
- 19 – Gary Anderson wins the BDO Scottish Open in his home country beating World Champion Martin Adams in the semi-final and Scott Waites in the final. Michael Rosenauer took the Dortmund Open title beating Marco Puls by 3 sets to 1.
- 21 – The Darts Regulation Authority (DRA) announce fines of £750 for Chris Mason, £400 for Phil Taylor and £300 for Steve Maish following incidents at the 2007 PDC World Darts Championship. Mason also received a four-month tournament ban (suspended for 12 months) for his unsportsmanlike manner.
- 22 – Barry Hearn announces a ground-breaking Grand Slam of Darts tournament to be held in Wolverhampton between 17 and 25 November. Players from both the PDC and BDO are to receive invitations to compete.
- 22 – Night four of the Premier League and Dennis Priestley remains top with a record equalling margin of victory, 8–1 over Adrian Lewis. Phil Taylor and Raymond van Barneveld both maintained unbeaten records, although van Barneveld was held to a draw by Terry Jenkins.
- 25 – Lionel Sams wins the West Tyrone Open, a non-ranking PDC event at the Mahons Hotel, Irvinestown. He beat Ray Farrell 8–4 in the final to take the top prize of £1,600

=== March ===
- 1 – The first re-match on UK soil between Raymond van Barneveld and Phil Taylor ends with Taylor extending his unbeaten run in the Premier League to 33 matches. His 8–6 win came despite being 1–5 behind at the interval. Dennis Priestley extended his stay at the top of the table with victory over Colin Lloyd
- 4 – Phil Taylor takes the Southern Regional Final UK Open title with a victory over Wayne Mardle in the final. Mervyn King had made his PDC debut at this event reaching the quarter-finals.
- 8 – Phil Taylor moved to the top of the Premier League as Dennis Priestley suffers his first defeat (by Peter Manley). Colin Lloyd missed a dart at double 12 for a nine dart finish during his defeat by Terry Jenkins.
- 11 – Dietmar Burger from Austria won the Finnish Open, a WDF Category 3 event beating Finland's Sami Sanssi in the final. The women's title went to Irina Armstrong of Russia who beat Finland's Sari Nikula in the final in Tampere.
- 15 – The Premier League reached the half-way stage and also made its first trip to the Winter Gardens, Blackpool. Phil Taylor maintained his unbeaten record, but there was a second successive defeat for Raymond van Barneveld at the hands of Dennis Priestley who remains second.
- 15 – An announcement confirms that the number of PDC players at the BDO/WDF International Darts League and World Darts Trophy will increase. The 2007 events will feature 20 PDC players and 12 BDO/WDF players compared to just 5 PDC players in 2006.
- 16 – Carlos Rodrigues Sequera of Spain wins the Gibraltar Open (WDF Category 4 Event) beating England's Gavin Forsythe in the final. Scotland's Margaret Ferguson won the women's singles.
- 17 – Simon Whitlock wins the first event of a new Australian Grand Prix (AGP) in Wagga Wagga. The overall AGP winner will receive a place at the 2008 PDC World Championship and Whitlock (currently a BDO star) admitted "That's my goal". He followed it up by claiming the second event title on March 18.
- 18 – James Wade wins the North-West Regional Final UK Open title with a victory over Terry Jenkins in the final in Manchester. Wade had earlier beat Phil Taylor in the quarter-finals.
- 22 – The second half of the Premier League season got underway with the top two players Phil Taylor and Dennis Priestley both held to a draw by Roland Scholten and Terry Jenkins respectively. It allowed Raymond van Barneveld to close the gap slightly at the top.
- 24 – Raymond van Barneveld wins the Partypoker.net Players Championship, a PDC Pro Tour event in Frankfurt. Barneveld beat Ronnie Baxter by 3 sets to 1 in the final.
- 26 – Scott Waites maintains his excellent form in 2007 by winning the £2,000 top prize at the Welsh Masters in Rhyl. Waites added to his Dutch Open title (and Scottish Open runner-up cheque) by beating Phil Evans in the final.
- 29 – The top of the table clash in the Premier League ends with a comfortable 8–2 victory for Phil Taylor over Dennis Priestley. World Champion Raymond van Barneveld suffered his third defeat of the season with a 6–8 reverse to Colin Lloyd

=== April ===
- 1 – Andy Hamilton wins the Midlands Final of the UK Open – the last regional event before the televised finals in June. He beats James Wade 2–0 in sets in the final.
- 3 – After 14 years at the Circus Tavern the PDC announce that their World Championship will move the Alexandra Palace from 2008. The "Ally Pally" will host 2,500 spectators per session compared to 800–900 in Purfleet.
- 5 – Phil Taylor destroys Terry Jenkins 8–1 in the Premier League to stay top and qualify for the semi-finals of the event. Adrian Lewis ended his losing streak against Colin Lloyd and the other two matches were drawn.
- 6 – Ron Meulenkamp becomes the latest Dutch player to confirm a switch to play for the PDC – following the likes of Michael van Gerwen, Jelle Klaasen, Toon Grebe and Vincent van der Voort.
- 8 – In a friendly international match at the Lakeside Country Club England's men, women and youth teams (WDF eligible players) defeated their Netherlands counterparts 26–16.
- 12 – The organisers of the International Darts League come to an agreement to allow the BDO/WDF players ranked 13 to 28 to enter the competition at the preliminary round stage having previously reneged on a deal which led to a threat of court action. The competition is now further expanded to 56 players (see International Darts League article)
- 12 – Week 11 of 14 in the Premier League saw the top four begin to pull away. Phil Taylor is already guaranteed a semi-final spot and Dennis Priestley, Raymond van Barneveld and Terry Jenkins are now just one win each away from qualification.
- 14 – Terry Jenkins wins the Antwerp Open – a non-ranking PDC event beating Andy Smith by 3 sets to 0 in the final.
- 14 – Tony Eccles wins the Norway Open (a WDF category 3) event in Tønsberg beating Dutchman Hans Blijs in the final. England's Dee Bateman surprises Karin Krappen to take the women's title.
- 15 – Terry Jenkins completes a perfect weekend by taking the Antwerp Darts Trophy – a PDPA Players Championship to add to his Antwerp Open title 24 hours previously. He beat Colin Lloyd in the final.
- 19 – Phil Taylor extends his Premier League unbeaten run to 40 matches with a win over Colin Lloyd. Raymond van Barneveld and Dennis Priestley produced a remarkable leg of darts during the Dutchman's win. Both players started with two 180s leaving two possibilities of a nine dart leg – Barney took it in 11 darts.
- 21 – After a day of PDPA qualifying Chris Mason, Wayne Jones, Richie Burnett, Alan Tabern, Mark Dudbridge, Matt Clark, Kevin McDine and Robbie Green all secure places in the preliminary round for the International Darts League to be held in May.
- 21 – Martin Adams clinches his first title since his BDO World Championship success in January. He beat John Walton in the final of the German Open. Sweden's Carina Ekberg won the Women's singles.
- 25 – Further controversy over the structure of the International Darts League results in a Dutch court having to resolve a dispute by the players from the Keukenconcurrent stable – van Gerwen, King, Klaasen and van der Voort (see International Darts League article).
- 26 – The Holsten Premier League witnessed its first ever whitewash as Colin Lloyd beat Terry Jenkins 8–0. Jenkins still confirmed his qualification for the semi-finals joining Phil Taylor, Raymond van Barneveld and Dennis Priestley.
- 28 – Michael van Gerwen successfully defends his Open Holland title (a non-ranked PDC event) beating Colin Osborne in the final. Van Gerwen defeated James Wade, Alan Tabern, Dennis Ovens and Wayne Jones in the earlier rounds.
- 29 – Peter Manley wins the Open Holland Masters PDPA Championship in Schediam. He beat James Wade 3–0 in the final with a 108.33 average. Manley had earlier beaten Rico Vonck, John Ferrell, Michael van Gerwen, Sean Palfrey, Wayne Mardle and Terry Jenkins en route.

=== May ===
- 3 – The final matches in the group stage of the Premier League are complete and the semi-final line-up is confirmed as Taylor v Priestley and Jenkins v Barneveld. Roland Scholten finishes bottom of the table.
- 8 – Phil Taylor hits the fourth televised nine dart finish of his career at the 2007 International Darts League
- 9 – Tony O'Shea matches Phil Taylor's feat from the previous day with another nine dart finish at the IDL – making it the first televised event with two nine-darters.
- 10 – The group stages at the IDL are completed and BDO World Champion Martin Adams and former World Champion Phil Taylor both fail to qualify.
- 11 – PDC World Champion Raymond van Barneveld goes out of the IDL to Tony O'Shea leaving Adrian Lewis as the last PDC player in the competition.
- 11 – PartyPoker.com are announced as sponsors for the Grand Slam of Darts in November and the prize fund is increased to £300,000 (higher than both the Premier League and the BDO World Championship).
- 12 – Mark Webster and Gary Anderson win through to the final of the IDL to make it an all WDF-affair and guarantee themselves places in the prestigious Grand Slam of Darts tournament in November.
- 13 – Gary Anderson wins his first major televised tournament claiming the 2007 International Darts League title in the Netherlands beating Mark Webster in the final.
- 14 – The Winmau World Masters (BDO) tournament is controversially moved to the weekend of 16–18 November causing a clash with the new Grand Slam of Darts event which was scheduled to feature players from both the PDC and BDO.
- 20 – Phil Taylor adds the new US Open to his list of titles beating Raymond van Barneveld in the final.
- 20 – Mark Webster wins his home country's Welsh Open beating Scott Waites in the final. Trina Gulliver beat Francis Hoenselaar in the women's final.
- 28 – Phil Taylor wins the 2007 Premier League beating Terry Jenkins 16–6 in the final. Taylor has remained unbeaten since the league started in 2005 and he extended his run to 44 matches.

=== June ===
- 2 – Wayne Atwood wins the Thialf Open (a non-ranked PDC event) in Heerenveen beating Gary Welding in the final.
- 3 – Roland Scholten takes the Thailf Darts Trophy title – a PDPA Players Championship in Heerenveen, Netherlands. He beat Mervyn King, Lionel Sams, Barrie Bates and Kevin Painter then fellow countryman Leroy Kwadijk in the semi-finals and Chris Mason in the final.
- 3 – Co Stompé wins the Swiss Open (WDF category 3 event) in Lausen beating fellow Dutchman Edwin Max in the final. The women's title went to Tricia Wright with a victory over Irina Armstrong of Russia in the final.
- 4 – Tony Eccles adds to the exodus of players from the BDO by joining the PDPA/PDC on the eve of the 2007 UK Open. Eccles was ranked number two in the WDF rankings at the time and sacrifices his place in the England World Cup team.
- 9 – Phil Taylor achieves his fifth televised nine dart finish at the UK Open against Wes Newton. It was also his second televised nine-darter of the year and his third at the UK Open.
- 10 – Raymond van Barneveld, having already knocked out John Part in the early rounds, beats Phil Taylor, Colin Lloyd and Vincent van der Voort on the final day to successfully defend his UK Open title.
- 10 – Mark Webster beats Martin Phillips to take the Welsh National title.
- 13 – John Part wins the Canadian singles national title beating Danny MacKenzie in the final. Part's fifth title equals Bob Sinnaeve's record haul. The Canadian Open (WDF Category 2 Event) was won by Mark Webster.
- 16 – Terry Jenkins won the Players Championship in Hayling Island beating Wes Newton 3–0 in sets. Steve Beaton's run to the semi-final of the tournament virtually secured a place at the World Matchplay in Blackpool.
- 17 – John Part won the second Players Championship of the weekend in Hayling Island beating Mervyn King 3–1 in sets. It was King's first Pro Tour final since switching to the PDC and meant he qualified for the World Matchplay in July. Michael van Gerwen, Adrian Gray and Steve Beaton were the other qualifiers from the Player's Championship Order of Merit.
- 17 – Ted Hankey wins the England Open (WDF category 2 event) beating Gary Anderson in the final. Anastasia Dobromyslova wins the women's title.

=== July ===
- 1 – Raymond van Barneveld wins his fourth PDC Pro Tour title of the year by beating Terry Jenkins on the deciding leg of the Las Vegas Players Championship, a new event on the eve of the Las Vegas Desert Classic.
- 4 – Phil Taylor loses in the opening round of the 2007 Las Vegas Desert Classic to Mark Dudbridge.
- 8 – Raymond van Barneveld makes amends for his loss to John Part at the 2006 Las Vegas Desert Classic by beating him in this year's semi final. He then defeats Terry Jenkins to take the title – his third major of 2007.
- 8 – Mark Webster wins the Welsh Classic in Rhyl beating Ian White in the final. Francis Hoenselaar beats Lorraine Abley to take the women's title.
- 14 – David Chisnall form Lancashire won the BDO Gold Cup beating Matthew Quinlan from Brecon in the final.
- 17 – Alan Bolton wins the New Zealand national championship winning a place at the 2008 PDC World Darts Championship.
- 20 – Andy Smith, Denis Ovens, Mark Walsh, Peter Allen, Bob Anderson, Alan Caves, Garry Spedding and Wayne Atwood win through the PDC qualifying event for the 2007 World Darts Trophy and will play in the Preliminary round of the WDT on August 31.
- 21 – Phil Taylor takes his fifth successive Bobby Bourne Memorial title in Blackpool on the eve of the World Matchplay beating Adrian Lewis in the final. The event had been upgraded to PDPA Players Championship status this year.
- 26 – Raymond van Barneveld is narrowly beaten 14–16 by Adrian Lewis in the quarter-finals of his World Matchplay debut in Blackpool. Rival Phil Taylor destroys Roland Scholten 16–1, the heaviest defeat in Matchplay history.
- 27 – Phil Taylor is knocked out of the World Matchplay by Terry Jenkins in the semi-final. It is the first time he has lost his grip on both the World Matchplay and World Championship since 1995.
- 28 – James Wade wins his first PDC major title clinching the 2007 World Matchplay in Blackpool. Terry Jenkins was unable to follow up his semi-final success over Phil Taylor losing to Wade in the final.
- 29 – Co Stompé wins the Red Dragondarts.com British Classic (WDF Category 3 event) in Kettering beating Steve Farmer in the final. Claire Bywaters took the women's title.
- 31 – The PDC and Stan James confirm the prize fund for the 2008 World Matchplay will increase by £100,000 to £300,000 – the winner will receive £60,000.

=== August ===
- 5 – Tony West wins the Belgian Open for the second time defeating Ted Hankey in the final. The women's title went to Francis Hoenselaar.
- 6 – PDPA member Fred Boddey, 58, from Derby is killed in a motorcycle accident. The tragedy occurred on his wife's 52nd birthday.
- 7 – The PDC announce a £70,000 increase in the 2008 Prize Fund for the Blue Square UK Open The winner will take £35,000 and there are increased for regional final prizes.
- 10 – Scott Waites (BDO/WDF) and Dennis Priestley (PDC) are added to the field for the Grand Slam of Darts as the highest ranked players who haven't already qualified.
- 13 – The BDO confirm a prize money increase for the November Winmau World Masters. The overall prize fund doubles to £60,000 with the winner receiving £25,000, runner-up £10,000 and semi-finalists £3,000.
- 16 – The Dutch Grand Masters is revived as a WDF event after being cancelled in 2006. The event is booked for December and will be sponsored by its venue Zuiderduin Hotel and known as the Zuiderduin Masters.
- 17 – ITV announce a wildcard tournament will be held on September 30 to decide a place (and a minimum of £4,000) in the Grand Slam in November.
- 25 – Steve West beats Yorkshireman James Wilson to win the Danish Open (WDF Category 3 event). Francisca Hoeneslaar won her fourth Danish Open title when she beat rival Trina Gulliver in the final.
- 26 – Wayne Mardle wins his first PDC Pro Tour event for almost three years by claiming the Peachtree Open in Atlanta. He beat James Wade in the final.

=== September ===
- 2 – Jelle Klaasen repeats his 2006 BDO World final success over Raymond van Barneveld by beating him again in the first round of the World Darts Trophy in their native Netherlands.
- 6 – Andy Hamilton put out BDO World Champion Martin Adams in the WDT in Utrecht. He came from 1–4 down to win 5–4 in sets and hit 14 maximum 180s in the quarter-final.
- 9 – Gary Anderson completed a successful double in the Dutch PDC/BDO event by adding the World Darts Trophy to his International Darts League success in May. He beat Phil Taylor 7–3 in the final, played over the same format as both World Championship finals.
- 9 – Denis Ovens beats Colin Osborne in the final of the Ireland Open Classic, a PDPA Players Championship at Castlebar.
- 15 – Andy Fordham returns to competitive action after a nine-month absence through illness. He competed in the Turunc Open in Turkey and reached the semi-finals. He lost to Martin Phillips of Wales, who then beat Darryl Fitton in the final.
- 16 – Ronnie Baxter beats James Wade to win the Windy City Open – his first PDC Pro Tour title since 2005.
- 22 – Raymond van Barneveld gets back on the title trail beating Alex Roy in the final of the PDPA Welsh Players Championship in Newport. Roy beat Phil Taylor in the earlier rounds and his run snatched the fourth qualification place for the World Grand Prix from Michael van Gerwen and Alan Warriner-Little. Mervyn King, Vincent van der Voort and Adrian Gray were the other qualifiers.
- 24 – Gary Anderson won the British Open in Bridlington beating fellow Scot John Henderson in the final. There was a shock defeat for BDO World Champion Martin Adams who lost to Daz Twist in the last 64. The women's title went to Anastasia Dobromyslova who defeated Dee Bateman by three legs to one.
- 23 – The first regional final of the 2007–08 UK Open Darts was won by James Wade, who beat Raymond van Barneveld in the final in Newport.
- 30 – The South African Open is won by Charles Losper who wins a qualifying place at the Grand Slam of Darts and 2008 PDC World Championship.
- 30 – Chris Mason and Kevin McDine win the two wildcard places at the Grand Slam of Darts in the ITV qualifying event for the tournament. 230 players had entered the event which guarantees £4,000 to each qualifier.

=== October ===
- 1 – Phil Taylor wins the South African Masters beating Raymond van Barneveld in the final. The tournament started with the top four PDC ranked players against the top four South Africans from the previous day's Open event. All four lost to the more experienced PDC players.
- 1 – Rizal Barellano from the Philippines won their national qualifying event and a place at the 2008 PDC World Championship.
- 2 – The BDO announce record prize money of £310,000 for the 2008 World Championship. The winner will take home £85,000. The prize fund is still short of the PDC's total for their World Championship.
- 6 – Phil Taylor wins the Irish Players Championship in Dublin, the first of the weekend's Pro Tour events on the eve of the World Grand Prix in Dublin. He beat James Wade in the final. Raymond van Barneveld suffered an early defeat 0–3 by Alex Roy in the last 32.
- 7 – Raymond van Barneveld wins his 10th PDC Pro Tour title when he beats Kevin McDine in the UK Open Irish Regional final. Adrian Lewis defeated Phil Taylor in the last 16.
- 8 – Phil Taylor loses in the first round of the World Grand Prix in Dublin to Adrian Gray. It was only his third defeat in the ten-year history of the event, with all three coming in the best of three set first round.
- 12 – Adrian Gray's giant-killing run at the World Grand Prix is ended in the quarter-finals by John Part despite taking an early lead he lost 2–4. Raymond van Barneveld beats Adrian Lewis 4–3 in a thriller.
- 13 – James Wade beats Raymond van Barneveld in the semi-final of the World Grand Prix in Dublin. Wade missed a bullseye in the fifth set for a nine dart finish which would have been the first ever with a double to start. Terry Jenkins made it to his fifth final in a year by beating John Part, whose defeat meant that Adrian Lewis qualified for the 2008 Premier League.
- 14 – Mark Webster wins the WDF World Cup singles beating Norway's Robert Wagner in the final. England won the men's team final, and the Netherlands won the overall men's points competition.
- 14 – James Wade wins the World Grand Prix in Dublin to add to his World Matchplay title won in July. He repeated his victory over Terry Jenkins in the final.
- 20 – Andy Smith wins the Scottish PDPA Players Championship in Irvine. He averaged 108.94 in the final against James Wade. It was Smith's first Pro Tour title since February 2005 and was Wade's fourth Players final defeat of the year.
- 21 – James Wade wins his third career UK Open Regional Final (and second of the current season) at the Scottish event in Irvine. He beat Ronnie Baxter in the final.
- 22 – The draw is made for the inaugural Grand Slam of Darts to be held in November.
- 23 – The BDO announce that November's Winmau World Masters will feature eight seeded players for the first time – which guarantees the top eight players a place in the BBC televised stages.
- 27 – Wayne Mardle wins his second PDC Pro Tour title of 2007, beating James Wade in the German Darts Trophy (Players Championship) in Kirchheim. The title took him back into the top 10 in the PDC world rankings.
- 27 – Per Laursen moves four points clear of Vladimir Anderson in the race for the Danish qualifying place at the 2008 PDC World Championship.
- 27 – Warren Parry qualifies for the 2008 PDC World Championship by winning the DPA Oceanic Masters for the second time. He beat Brian Roach in the final. Veteran Russell Stewart reached the semi-finals before losing to Roach.
- 30 – The World Darts Federation announce that the eight players who had been given seedings by the BDO for the Winmau World Masters will not receive any ranking points as the decision made it "no longer compatible with the points allocation used for the WDF World Ranking System".

=== November ===
- 3 – Mark Walsh wins his first PDC title in over two years beating Vincent van der Voort in the final of the non-ranked Gleneagle Irish Masters in Killarney.
- 4 – Jelle Klaasen claims his first PDC Pro Tour title since his switch in January. He beat fellow countryman Vincent van der Voort in the final of a Players Championship event, the John McEvoy Gold Dart Classic in Killarney. Van der Voort had reached two finals in two days.
- 10 – Phil Taylor wins the first Players Championship of the weekend in Lisse, Netherlands. He beat Chris Mason in the final.
- 11 – Phil Taylor overcomes Raymond van Barneveld in his home country to clinch a double at the weekend's Players Championships in Lisse.
- 11 – Two-time former world champion Dennis Priestley, 57, makes an announcement through the PDC that he is suffering from prostate cancer.
- 11 – Gary Anderson defeats Darryl Fitton to win the Northern Ireland Open. Home player Denise Cassidy wins the women's title beating world champion Trina Gulliver in the final.
- 15 – The play-offs for the 2008 BDO World Championship are held in Bridlington on the eve of the World Masters. Fabian Roosenbrand, Michael Rosenauer, Glenn Moody and Mike Veitch are the qualifiers with Ian Jones the standby player.
- 16 – The PDPA qualifiers for the 2008 PDC World Championship are held in Wolverhampton. Several legend players including Eric Bristow and John Lowe all fail to qualify with Steve Maish, Jan van der Rassel, Colin Monk, Steve Evans, Jamie Caven, Steve Hine, Kirk Shepherd and Jason Barry the successful qualifiers.
- 17 – John Walton hits the first nine dart finish in the 34-year history of the Winmau World Masters on the opening day of the televised stages. The feat is captured by BBC cameras but not shown live as it happened in the last 16 before coverage began.
- 17 – The Grand Slam of Darts gets underway in Wolverhampton – a surprise defeat for number three seed Gary Anderson was the upset of the first group matches.
- 18 – Robert Thornton surprises the field by clinching the 2007 Winmau World Masters in Bridlington. He beat Martin Adams, Martin Atkins and Darryl Fitton on his way to the title.
- 20 – The group stage in the Grand Slam of Darts ends – of the top eight seeds, only Michael van Gerwen fails to reach the last 16.
- 23 – Bob Potter, owner of the Lakeside Country Club announces an extension of their sponsorship of the BDO World Darts Championship until 2010. The Lakeside have sponsored the event since the ban on tobacco advertising came in after the 2003 championships.
- 25 – Phil Taylor wins the Grand Slam of Darts by beating Andy Hamilton 18–11 in the final to capture the £80,000 prize and become the first winner of the competition.
- 25 – Shaun Greatbatch wins the Swedish Open with a 4–1 victory over fellow Englishman Dave Prins. Greatbatch had beaten new World Masters winner Robert Thornton 4–2 in the last four. Sweden's Carina Ekberg beat Norway's Rachna David 4–3 for the women's title.
- 25 – The €10,000 top prize at the Glencairn International Classic is won by Mario Robbe in Castleblayney, Rep. Ireland. He beat Mike Veitch 8 legs to 4 in the final. Russia's Anastasia Dobromyslova took the €3,000 prize and women's title beating England's Trina Gulliver by 6 legs to 2.
- 26 – The draw is made for the PDC World Championship and sees Phil Taylor drawn against Michael van Gerwen in the first round.

=== December ===
- 1 – Jason Clark and Raymond van Barneveld both hit nine dart finishes in the early rounds of the German Darts Championship in Halle, North Rhine-Westphalia.
- 2 – Phil Taylor ends the year in excellent form by winning his fourth tournament in succession. He wins the inaugural German Darts Championship in Halle, North Rhine-Westphalia. Since his loss to Adrian Gray at the World Grand Prix, Taylor has now won 26 consecutive matches.
- 9 – Gary Anderson wins the Zuiderduin Masters in the Netherlands beating Mark Webster in the final.
- 17 – The 2008 PDC World Darts Championship gets underway at the tournament moves to Alexandra Palace after 14 years at the Circus Tavern.
- 22 – A televised "Legends Tour" is confirmed as an addition to the darts calendar for 2008 – Setanta Sports will screen the Legends Nights from May to August next year which will feature Eric Bristow, John Lowe, Keith Deller, Cliff Lazarenko, Bobby George, Dave Whitcombe, Peter Evison and one further player to be confirmed at a later date.
- 29 – Phil Taylor fails to make the PDC World final for the first time as he suffers a quarter final defeat by Wayne Mardle
- 30 – Two-time former World Champion John Part and 21-year-old qualifier Kirk Shepherd progress to the final of the 2008 PDC World Championship which takes place on New Year's Day.

== PDC ==
=== World Darts Championship ===
| | Score | |
|---|---|---|
Quarter-finals
| Raymond van Barneveld (Netherlands) | 5–0 | (England) Alan Tabern |
| Andy Jenkins (England) | 5–4 | (England) Colin Osborne |
| Andy Hamilton (England) | 5–4 | (England) Terry Jenkins |
| Darren Webster (England) | 1–5 | (England) Phil Taylor |
Semi-finals
| Raymond van Barneveld (Netherlands) | 6–0 | (England) Andy Jenkins |
| Andy Hamilton (England) | 0–6 | (England) Phil Taylor |
Final
| Raymond van Barneveld (Netherlands) | 7–6 | (England) Phil Taylor |

=== US Open ===
| | Score | |
|---|---|---|
Quarter-finals
| Phil Taylor (England) | 3–0 | (England) Mervyn King |
| John Part (Canada) | 3–0 | (England) Ronnie Baxter |
| Andy Hamilton (England) | 3–0 | (England) Mark Dudbridge |
| Raymond van Barneveld (Netherlands) | 3–0 | (Netherlands) Roland Scholten |
Semi-finals
| Phil Taylor (England) | 3–1 | (Canada) John Part |
| Raymond van Barneveld (Netherlands) | 3–1 | (England) Andy Hamilton |
Final
| Phil Taylor (England) | 4–1 | (Netherlands) Raymond van Barneveld |

=== UK Open ===
| | Score (legs) | |
|---|---|---|
Quarter-finals
| Raymond van Barneveld (Netherlands) | 11–4 | (England) Phil Taylor |
| Colin Lloyd (England) | 11–6 | (England) Steve Hine |
| Vincent van der Voort (Netherlands) | 11–10 | (England) Terry Jenkins |
| Colin Osborne (England) | 11–6 | (England) Alan Green |
Semi-finals
| Vincent van der Voort (Netherlands) | 11–10 | (England) Colin Osborne |
| Raymond van Barneveld (Netherlands) | 11–4 | (England) Colin Lloyd |
Final
| Raymond van Barneveld (Netherlands) | 16–8 | (Netherlands) Vincent van der Voort |

=== Las Vegas Desert Classic ===
| | Score (legs) | |
|---|---|---|
Quarter-finals
| Raymond van Barneveld (Netherlands) | 10–4 | (Netherlands) Roland Scholten |
| John Part (Canada) | 10–9 | (England) Dennis Smith |
| Peter Manley (England) | 10–8 | (England) Adrian Lewis |
| Terry Jenkins (England) | 10–7 | (United States) Gary Mawson |
Semi-finals
| Raymond van Barneveld (Netherlands) | 11–7 | (Canada) John Part |
| Terry Jenkins (England) | 11–8 | (England) Peter Manley |
Final
| Raymond van Barneveld (Netherlands) | 13–6 | (England) Terry Jenkins |

=== World Matchplay ===
| | Score (legs) | |
|---|---|---|
Quarter-finals
| Phil Taylor (England) | 16–1 | (Netherlands) Roland Scholten |
| Terry Jenkins (England) | 16–13 | (England) Ronnie Baxter |
| Adrian Lewis (England) | 16–14 | (Netherlands) Raymond van Barneveld |
| James Wade (England) | 16–11 | (England) Mervyn King |
Semi-finals
| Terry Jenkins (England) | 17–11 | (England) Phil Taylor |
| James Wade (England) | 17–7 | (England) Adrian Lewis |
Final
| James Wade (England) | 18–7 | (England) Terry Jenkins |

=== World Grand Prix ===
| | Score (legs) | |
|---|---|---|
Quarter-finals
| James Wade (England) | 4–0 | (England) Colin Lloyd |
| Raymond van Barneveld (Netherlands) | 4–3 | (England) Adrian Lewis |
| Terry Jenkins (England) | 4–1 | (England) Mark Dudbridge |
| John Part (Canada) | 4–2 | (England) Adrian Gray |
Semi-finals
| James Wade (England) | 5–1 | (Netherlands) Raymond van Barneveld |
| Terry Jenkins (England) | 5–3 | (Canada) John Part |
Final
| James Wade (England) | 6–3 | (England) Terry Jenkins |

=== German Darts Championship ===
- PartyPoker.net German Darts Championship

Saturday 1 December to Sunday 2 December
Quarter-finals (Best of five sets, best of three legs per set) losers €3,000
Phil Taylor 3–0 Wayne Mardle (2–0, 2–1, 2–0)
Mark Walsh 3–1 Kevin McDine (2–0, 0–2, 2–1, 2–0)
Roland Scholten 3–1 Raymond van Barneveld (2–1, 2–0, 1–2, 2–0)
Colin Lloyd 1–3 Denis Ovens (2–1, 1–2, 1–2, 0–2)

Semi-finals (Best of seven sets) losers €6,000
Phil Taylor 4–1 Mark Walsh (2–1, 1–2, 2–0, 2–0, 2–1)
Denis Ovens 4–1 Roland Scholten (2–1, 1–2, 2–1, 2–1, 2–0)

Final (Best of seven sets) winner €25,000, runner-up €12,000
Phil Taylor 4–1 Denis Ovens (1–2, 2–0, 2–1, 2–1, 2–0)

=== PDC Pro Tour events ===
==== Players Championships ====
(All matches – Best of 5 sets, Best of 3 legs per set)

- Gibraltar, January 20: Raymond van Barneveld 3–1 Adrian Lewis
- Gibraltar, January 21: Andy Hamilton 3–1 Colin Lloyd
- Frankfurt, March 24: Raymond van Barneveld 3–1 Ronnie Baxter
- Antwerp Darts Trophy, April 15: Terry Jenkins 3–1 Colin Lloyd
- Open Holland Masters, April 29: Peter Manley 3–0 James Wade
- Thialf Darts Trophy, Heerenveen, June 3: Roland Scholten 3–1 Chris Mason
- Hayling Island, June 16: Terry Jenkins 3–0 Wes Newton
- Hayling Island, June 17: John Part 3-1 Mervyn King
- Las Vegas, July 1: Raymond van Barneveld 3–2 Terry Jenkins
- Bobby Bourn Memorial Trophy, Blackpool, July 21: Phil Taylor 3–1 Adrian Lewis
- Peachtree Open, Atlanta, Georgia, August 26: Wayne Mardle 3–2 James Wade
- Ireland Open Classic, County Mayo, Rep. Ireland, September 9: Denis Ovens 3–0 Colin Osborne
- Windy City Open, Chicago, September 16: Ronnie Baxter 3–1 James Wade
- Newport, Wales, September 22: Raymond van Barneveld 3–0 Alex Roy
- Dublin, October 6: Phil Taylor 3–0 James Wade
- Irvine, October 20: Andy Smith 3–0 James Wade
- German Darts Trophy, October 27: Wayne Mardle 3–1 James Wade
- John McEvoy Gold Dart Classic, Killarney, November 4: Jelle Klaasen 3–2 Vincent van der Voort
- Lisse, Netherlands, November 10: Phil Taylor 3–0 Chris Mason
- Lisse, Netherlands, November 11: Phil Taylor 3–2 Raymond van Barneveld

==== UK Open Regional Finals ====
2006/2007 Finals – Best of 3 sets, Best of 3 legs per set

- January 6 (North-East) Raymond van Barneveld 2–0 Roland Scholten
- February 11 (South-West) Dennis Priesley 2–0 James Wade
- March 4 (South) Phil Taylor 2–0 Wayne Mardle
- March 18 (North-West) James Wade 2–0 Terry Jenkins
- April 1 (Midlands) Andy Hamilton 2–0 James Wade

2007/2008 Finals – Best of 15 legs

- September 23, 2007 (Wales): James Wade 8–7 Raymond van Barneveld
- October 7 (Ireland): Raymond van Barneveld 8–2 Kevin McDine
- October 21 (Scotland): James Wade 8–2 Ronnie Baxter

=== Holsten Premier League ===
Final group stage table

| Pos | Name | P | W | D | L | +/- | LWAT | Pts |
|---|---|---|---|---|---|---|---|---|
| 1 | (England) Phil Taylor | 14 | 11 | 3 | 0 | +57 | 43 | 25 |
| 2 | (Netherlands) Raymond van Barneveld | 14 | 7 | 3 | 4 | +16 | 32 | 17 |
| 3 | (England) Terry Jenkins | 14 | 6 | 3 | 5 | −4 | 26 | 15 |
| 4 | (England) Dennis Priestley | 14 | 5 | 3 | 6 | +1 | 34 | 13 |
| 5 | (England) Colin Lloyd | 14 | 6 | 0 | 8 | −2 | 33 | 12 |
| 6 | (England) Peter Manley | 14 | 4 | 3 | 7 | −23 | 26 | 11 |
| 7 | (England) Adrian Lewis | 14 | 5 | 0 | 9 | −27 | 24 | 10 |
| 8 | (Netherlands) Roland Scholten | 14 | 3 | 3 | 8 | −18 | 27 | 9 |

NB: LWAT = Legs Won Against Throw. Players separated by +/- leg difference if tied.

| | Score | |
|---|---|---|
Semi-finals
| Phil Taylor (England) | 11–6 | (England) Dennis Priestley |
| Raymond van Barneveld (Netherlands) | 10–11 | (England) Terry Jenkins |
Final
| Phil Taylor (England) | 16–6 | (England) Terry Jenkins |

== BDO ==
=== World Darts Championship ===
| | Score | |
|---|---|---|
Quarter-finals
| Martin Adams (England) | 5–3 | (England) Ted Hankey |
| Mervyn King (England) | 5–4 | (England) Tony Eccles |
| Paul Hanvidge (Scotland) | 4–5 | (England) Phill Nixon |
| Niels de Ruiter (Netherlands) | 5–4 | (England) Gary Robson |
Semi-finals
| Martin Adams (England) | 6–5 | (England) Mervyn King |
| Phill Nixon (England) | 6–4 | (Netherlands) Niels de Ruiter |
Final
| Martin Adams (England) | 7–6 | (England) Phill Nixon |

=== WDF Category 1 Events ===
WDF ranking points awarded: Winner 150, Runner-up 100, Semi-finalists 80, Quarter-finalists 48, 9th to 16th place 24, 17th to 32nd place 12.

- Dutch Open in Veldhoven, Netherlands, February 1–4 (Total Prize Fund €32,000)

Men's Singles Quarter-finals (Losers €500, best of 5 legs) Martin Atkins 3–1 Niels de Ruiter, Scott Waites 3–1 Tony O'Shea, Steve West 3–1 Cor Ernst, Edwin Max 3–1 Toon Greebe
Semi-finals (Losers €1,250, best of 3 sets) Scott Waites 2–0 Martin Atkins, Steve West 2–1 Edwin Max
Final (Winner €4,500 Runner-up €2,250, best of 5 sets) Scott Waites 3–0 Steve West
Women's Singles Final (Winner €2,250 Runner-up €1,250) Trina Gulliver 5–2 Clare Bywaters

- Scottish Open at the Normandy Cosmopolitan Hotel, Renfrew, February 17–18,

Men's Singles Quarter-finals (Losers £100, best of 5 legs) Jarkko Komula (Finland) 3–2 Andy Boulton (England) , Scott Waites (England) 3–2 Steve West (England) , Martin Adams (England) 3–0 Jonny Nijs (Netherlands) , Gary Anderson (Scotland) 3–2 Tony O'Shea (England)
Semi-finals (Losers £300, best of 7 legs) Scott Waites (England) 4–3 Jarkko Komula (Finland) , Gary Anderson (Scotland) 4–2 Martin Adams (England)
Final (Winner £2,000 Runner-up £800 best of 9 legs) Gary Anderson (Scotland) 5–3 Scott Waites (England)
Women's Singles Final (Winner £700 Runner-up £300 best of 7 legs) Karin Krappen (Northern Ireland) 4–2 Sarah Cope (England)

- Bulls German Open in Bochum, April 20–21,

Men's Singles Quarter-finals (Losers €200, best of 3 sets, best of 3 legs) Tony O'Shea (England) 2–0 Steve West (England) , Martin Adams (England) 2–0 Scott Waites (England) , Ted Hankey (England) 2–0 Patrick Loos (Netherlands) , John Walton (England) 2–0 Mensur Suljović (Austria)
Semi-finals (Losers €400, best of 3 sets, best of 3 legs) Martin Adams (England) 2–1 Tony O'Shea (England) , John Walton (England) 2–1 Ted Hankey (England)
Final (Winner €2,000 Runner-up €1,000 best of 5 sets, best of 3 legs) Martin Adams (England) 3–1 John Walton (England)
Women's Singles Final (Winner €800 Runner-up €400 best of 7 legs) Carina Ekberg (Sweden) 2–1 Carla Molema (Netherlands)

- Red Dragon Sports Welsh Open in Prestatyn, May 18–20

Semi-finals (Losers £300, best of 3 sets, best of 3 legs) Mark Webster (Wales) 2–1 Chris Thompson (England) , Scott Waites (England) 2–1 Remco van Eijden (Netherlands)
Final (Winner £2,000 Runner-up £800 best of 3 sets, best of 3 legs) Mark Webster (Wales) 2–0 Scott Waites (England)
Women's Singles Final (Winner £800 Runner-up £400) Trina Gulliver 3–1 Francis Hoesenlaar

=== WDF Category 2 Events ===
WDF ranking points awarded: Winner 120, Runner-up 80, Semi-finalists 60, Quarter-finalists 36, 9th to 16th place 18, 17th to 32nd place 9.

- German Gold Cup, at Sportcenter VfB Komet, Bremen on January 27

Men's Singles Semi-finals (Losers €170) Tony Eccles 2–0 Jyhan Artut; Remco van Eijden 2–1 Michael Klönhammer.
Final (Winner €350 Runner-up €350) Tony Eccles 3–1 Remco van Eijden (0–2, 2–1, 2–0, 2–1)
Women's Singles Final (Winner €280 Runner-up €140) Heike Ernst 2–1 Thea Kaaijk (2–1, 1–2, 3–1)

- Las Vegas Open (29th Tom Fleetwood Memorial Open) at the Tuscany Suites, Las Vegas, Nevada on January 28.

Men's Singles Semi-finalists (Losers US$200) (United States) Jim Widmayer, (United States) John Kramer
Final (Winner US$800, Runner-up US$400) (United States) Chris White beat (United States) John Kuczynski.
Women's Singles Final (Winner US$400, Runner-up US$200) Stacey Bromberg beat Marilyn Popp

- Dortmund Open at the Sporthalle Renninghausen, Dortmund, Germany on February 17.

Men's Singles Semi-finals (Losers €160, best of 3 sets) Michael Rosenauer 2–1 Geert de Vos, Marko Puls 2–1 Mareno Michels
Final (Winner €750, Runner-up €350, best of 5 sets) Michael Rosenauer (Germany) 3–1 Marko Puls (Germany) (0–2, 2–1, 2–0, 2–1)
Women's Singles Final (Winner €350, Runner-up €170) Zsofia Lazar (Hungary) 2–0 Zusana Stepanova (Czech Republic) (2–0, 2–1)

- Canadian Open at the Saskatoon Inn, Saskatoon June 15–17.

Men's Singles Semi-finals (Losers CAN$250): (Wales) Mark Webster beat (Canada) Don MacDougall; (Canada) Norm Tremblay beat (Canada) Dion Laviolette
Final (Winner CAN$1000, Runner-up CAN$500): (Wales) Mark Webster beat (Canada) Norm Tremblay

- England Open at Pontins, Brean Sands, Somerset June 16–17.

Men's Singles Semi-finals (losers £200): (England) Ted Hankey beat (England) Scott Waites 3–2; (Scotland) Gary Anderson beat (England) James Wilson 3–0
Final (Winner £1500, Runner-up £500): (England) Ted Hankey beat (Scotland) Gary Anderson 3–0
Women's Singles Final: (Russia) Anastasia Dobromyslova 3–1 (England) Louise Carroll
Youth Singles Final: (England) Andrew Foster 2–0 (England) Simon Hartley

- Belgian Open in Temse, August 3–5

Semi-finals: (England) Ted Hankey beat (England) Robbie Turner 4–0; (England) Tony West beat (England) Gary Robson 4–2
Final: (England) Tony West beat (England) Ted Hankey 5–2
Women's Final: Francisca Hoenselaar beat Karin Krappen 4–1

== Other events ==
=== Masters of Darts ===
| | Score | |
|---|---|---|
Semi-finals
| Mervyn King (England) | 5–6 | (England) Peter Manley |
| Raymond van Barneveld (Netherlands) | 6–4 | (Netherlands) Michael van Gerwen |
Final
| Raymond van Barneveld (Netherlands) | 7–0 | (England) Peter Manley |

=== International Darts League ===
| | Score (legs) | |
|---|---|---|
Quarter-finals
| Gary Anderson (Scotland) | 6–3 | (England) James Wade |
| Adrian Lewis (England) | 6–2 | (England) Darryl Fitton |
| Tony O'Shea (England) | 6–4 | (Netherlands) Raymond van Barneveld |
| Mark Webster (Wales) | 6–2 | (England) Gary Robson |
Semi-finals
| Gary Anderson (Scotland) | 9–1 | (England) Adrian Lewis |
| Mark Webster (Wales) | 9–1 | (England) Tony O'Shea |
Final
| Gary Anderson (Scotland) | 13–9 | (Wales) Mark Webster |

=== World Darts Trophy ===
| | Score (sets) | |
|---|---|---|
Quarter-finals
| Gary Anderson (Scotland) | 5–1 | (England) Peter Manley |
| Andy Hamilton (England) | 5–4 | (England) Martin Adams |
| Mervyn King (England) | 5–3 | (Wales) Mark Webster |
| Phil Taylor (England) | 5–3 | (England) Terry Jenkins |
Semi-finals
| Gary Anderson (Scotland) | 6–5 | (England) Andy Hamilton |
| Phil Taylor (England) | 6–2 | (England) Mervyn King |
Final
| Gary Anderson (Scotland) | 7–3 | (England) Phil Taylor |

=== Grand Slam of Darts ===
| | Score (legs) | |
|---|---|---|
Quarter-finals
| Gary Anderson (Scotland) | 10–7 | (England) Kevin Painter |
| Andy Hamilton (England) | 10–8 | (England) Terry Jenkins |
| Kevin McDine (England) | 10–3 | (Netherlands) Jelle Klaasen |
| Phil Taylor (England) | 10–7 | (Canada) John Part |
Semi-finals
| Andy Hamilton (England) | 13–12 | (England) Kevin McDine |
| Phil Taylor (England) | 13–11 | (Scotland) Gary Anderson |
Final
| Phil Taylor (England) | 18–11 | Andy Hamilton |

=== Six Nations Cup ===
WDF Team Event in Veldhoven, Netherlands.February 24–25.

Semi-finals: Rep. Ireland (Republic of Ireland) 5 – 13 Netherlands, England 13 – 10 Scotland
Final: England 13–7 Netherlands

=== Antwerp Open ===
PDC non-ranking event at the Waasland Expo Hallen April 14 Total Prize fund €22,560

Semi-finals (losers €625): Andy Smith (England) 2 – 0 (England) Kevin Painter, Terry Jenkins (England) 2 – 0 (England) Darren Webster
Final (winner €2,500 runner-up €1,250): Terry Jenkins (England) 3 – 0 (England) Andy Smith

=== Open Holland ===
PDC non-ranking event at the Sport & Evanthal Margriet, Schiedam. April 29 Total Prize fund €15,000

Quarter-finals (losers €300): Wayne Jones (England) 5–4 (England) Kevin Painter, Michael van Gerwen (Netherlands) 5–3 (England) Denis Ovens, Colin Osborne (England) 5–1 (England) Andy Jenkins, Steve Beaton (England) 5–3 (England) Alex Roy
Semi-finals (losers €600): Michael van Gerwen (Netherlands) 6–2 (England) Wayne Jones, Colin Osborne (England) 6–2 (England) Steve Beaton
Final (winner €2,400 runner-up €1,200): Michael van Gerwen (Netherlands) 3–1 (England) Colin Osborne (3–2, 2–3, 3–1, 3–1)

=== Thialf Open ===
PDC non-ranking event at the Thialf, Heerenveen. June 2 Total Prize fund €15,000

Quarter-finals (losers €300): Vincent van der Voort (Netherlands) 5–0 (Netherlands) Erwin Extercatte, Wayne Atwood (Wales) 5–4 (England) Andy Smith, Gary Welding (England) 5–3 (England) Dennis Ovens, Colin Osborne (England) 5–3 (England) Ronnie Baxter
Semi-finals (losers €600): Wayne Atwood (Wales) 2–1 (Netherlands) Vincent van der Voort, Gary Welding (England) 2–1 (England) Colin Osborne
Final (winner €2,400 runner-up €1,200): Wayne Atwood (Wales) 3–2 (England) Gary Welding

== Darts calendar ==
| Date | Organisation | Event | Winner |
|---|---|---|---|
| December 18, 2006 to January 1 | PDC | Ladbrokes.com World Championship, Circus Tavern, Purfleet | (Netherlands) Raymond van Barneveld |
| January 6 to January 12 | BDO | Lakeside World Championship, Lakeside Country Club, Frimley Green | (England) Martin Adams |
| February 1 | PDC | Premier League opening week | concluded May 28 – see below |
| February 10 to February 18 | PDC | Masters of Darts, ExpoCentre, Hengelo, Netherlands | (Netherlands) Raymond van Barneveld |
| May 4 to May 13 | BDO / PDC | International Darts League, the Triavium, Nijmegen, Netherlands | (Scotland) Gary Anderson |
| May 18 to May 20 | PDC | US Open, Connecticut | (England) Phil Taylor |
| May 28 | PDC | Premier League Final, The Brighton Centre | (England) Phil Taylor |
| June 7 to June 10 | PDC | UK Open, Reebok Stadium, Bolton | (Netherlands) Raymond van Barneveld |
| July 2 to July 8 | PDC | Las Vegas Desert Classic VI, Mandalay Bay Hotel, Las Vegas | (Netherlands) Raymond van Barneveld |
| July 22 to July 28 | PDC | World Matchplay, Winter Gardens, Blackpool | (England) James Wade |
| September 1 to September 9 | BDO / PDC | World Darts Trophy, De Vechtsebanen, Utrecht, Netherlands | (Scotland) Gary Anderson |
| October 8 to October 14 | PDC | World Grand Prix, Dublin | (England) James Wade |
| November 15 | BDO | 2008 BDO World Championship qualifiers, Bridlington | |
| November 16 to November 18 | BDO | Winmau World Masters, Bridlington | (Scotland) Robert Thornton |
| November 17 to November 25 | BDO / PDC | Grand Slam of Darts, Wolverhampton Civic | (England) Phil Taylor |

The events listed as BDO/PDC, in the Netherlands, involve invited players from the PDC who join players that qualify through the BDO rankings system. The Grand Slam of Darts in the UK is organised by the PDC, with players from both organisations invited on the basis of recent tournament results in either organisation. For full BDO and PDC calendars including non-televised events see external links.
