= 2006 World Masters (darts) =

Winmau World Masters

Tournament information
- Dates: 13–15 October 2006
- Venue: Leisure World, Bridlington
- Location: East Riding of Yorkshire, England
- Country: England
- Organisation(s): BDO
- Format: Sets (best of 3 legs) for men, Legs for women, boys and girls Finals: best of 13 (men's)
- Prize fund: £24,000
- Winner's share: £15,000 (men's)

Champion(s)
- (Netherlands) Michael van Gerwen (men) (Netherlands) Francis Hoenselaar (women) (Netherlands) Maarten Pape (boys) (Wales) Kimberley Lewis (girls)

The 2006 Winmau World Masters was a darts tournament held at Leisure World in Bridlington between October 13–15, 2006. It also featured a qualifying event for the 2007 Lakeside World Professional Championship.

Seventeen-year-old Michael van Gerwen became the youngest winner in the 32-year history of the event when he defeated England captain Martin Adams in the final.

== Tournament Schedule ==
Thursday October 12, 2006

Qualifying event for the 2007 Lakeside World Professional Championship was held.

Friday October 13, 2006

Players from 30 countries played on a multi-board system to qualify for the stage matches to be played on Saturday and Sunday. There were some major upsets in the qualifying round as only 4 seeded players managed to progress to the last 16. Five seeded players even failed to reach the final qualifying round (last 32) of the tournament. World Champion, Jelle Klaasen was amongst the big-named players who went out early.

- Mervyn King (5) lost to Albertino Essers 2–3
- Vincent van der Voort (8) lost to Rick Hofstra 2–3
- Mike Veitch (10) lost to Joe Palmer 1–3
- Jelle Klaasen (13) lost to Mario Robbe 0–3
- Paul Hanvidge (15) lost to Roy Montgomery 1–3

Bobby George lost in the first qualifying round to Jim Widmeyer (USA). Former World Champion, Andy Fordham managed to progress through one qualifying round before losing to Benny Grace (Ire).

Saturday October 14, 2006

- 0900 Girls Final (Best of 5 Legs)

Kimberley Lewis Wales (Ave 63.06) beat Thea Kaaijk Netherlands (Ave 67.26) 4-2 (legs)

- 0930 Boys Final (Best of 5 Legs) Maarten Pape (Ned) Jan Dekker (Ned) v

Maarten Pape Netherlands (Ave 75.84) beat Jan Dekker Netherlands (Ave 71.64) 4-1 (legs)

- 1000 - 1640 Men's Championship Last 16 & Quarter-finals played

Sunday October 15, 2006

- 1130 - 1230 Women's Championship Semi-finals and final played
- 1330 Men's Championship Semi-finals & final played

== 2006 Men's Event results ==
Players in bold denote match winners.

- Each set is best of 3 legs.

Round 2 (best of 5 sets)
(England)	**Andy Boulton**	**3**
(Norway)	John Sandaker	2
(France)	Christian Demazure	1
(England)	**Tony O'Shea**	**3**
(Gibraltar)	Henry Zapata	0
(Republic of Ireland)	**John Cullen**	**3**
(England)	Paul Hogan	1
(England)	**Martin Adams**	**3**
(Sweden)	Kenneth Hogwall	1
(Netherlands)	**Co Stompé**	**3**
(Republic of Ireland)	Connie Finnan	1
(England)	**Martin Atkins**	**3**
(England)	John Elliot	0
(Wales)	**Carl Lewis**	**3**
(Republic of Ireland)	**Neil Duff**	**3**
(Netherlands)	Rick Hofstra	1
(England)	Gary Robson	1
(Sweden)	**Par Riihonen**	**3**
(United States)	Jim Widmayer	0
(England)	**John Walton**	**3**
(Denmark)	Preben Krabben	1
(Germany)	**Marko Puls**	**3**
(Wales)	**Paul Cosslett**	**3**
(Netherlands)	Albertino Essers	1
(Germany)	**Michael Rosenauer**	**3**
(Republic of Ireland)	James Keogh	2
(England)	Andy Nye	1
(Netherlands)	**Mario Robbe**	**3**
(England)	**Steve Farmer**	**3**
(Republic of Ireland)	Benny Grace	2
(Netherlands)	Mareno Michels	1
(England)	**Tony Eccles**	**3**
(England)	**Phil Nixon**	**3**
(Norway)	Ken Rune Jorgensen	0
(England)	**Scott Waites**	**3**
(Northern Ireland)	Roy Montgomery	0
(Wales)	**Mark Webster**	**3**
(Jersey)	Kenny Horton	0
(Northern Ireland)	John Elder	0
(Scotland)	**Gary Anderson**	**3**
(England)	Kevin Simm	0
(England)	**Brian Woods**	**3**
(England)	**Joe Palmer**	**3**
(Scotland)	Mike Veitch	1
(Northern Ireland)	Michael Blair	2
(Wales)	**Robert Hughes**	**3**
(England)	Mick Reed	1
(England)	**Ted Hankey**	**3**
(Wales)	**Martin Phillips**	**3**
(England)	Terry Temple	0
(Republic of Ireland)	Aodhagan O'Neill	1
(England)	**Shaun Greatbatch**	**3**
(Sweden)	Daniel Larsson	2
(Finland)	**Marko Kantele**	**3**
(Australia)	Tony David	2
(England)	**Darryl Fitton**	**3**
(Finland)	Jarkko Komula	2
(Norway)	**Robert Wagner**	**3**
(Belgium)	Chris van den Bergh	1
(Netherlands)	**Niels de Ruiter**	**3**
(England)	**Mick Cummins**	**3**
(Austria)	Dietmar Burger	2
(United States)	Anthony Miera	1
(Netherlands)	**Michael van Gerwen**	**3**

Round 3 (best of 5 sets)
(England)	**Andy Boulton**	**3**
(England)	Tony O'Shea	0
(Republic of Ireland)	John Cullen	1
(England)	**Martin Adams**	**3**
(Netherlands)	**Co Stompé**	**3**
(England)	Martin Atkins	0
(Wales)	**Carl Lewis**	**3**
(Republic of Ireland)	Neil Duff	1
(Sweden)	Par Riihonen	2
(England)	**John Walton**	**3**
(Germany)	Marko Puls	2
(Wales)	**Paul Cosslett**	**3**
(Germany)	**Michael Rosenauer**	**3**
(Netherlands)	Mario Robbe	1
(England)	**Steve Farmer**	**3**
(England)	Tony Eccles	2
(England)	**Phil Nixon**	**3**
(England)	Scott Waites	1
(Wales)	**Mark Webster**	**3**
(Scotland)	Gary Anderson	1
(England)	**Brian Woods**	**3**
(England)	Joe Palmer	1
(Wales)	**Robert Hughes**	**3**
(England)	Ted Hankey	2
(Wales)	**Martin Phillips**	**3**
(England)	Shaun Greatbatch	2
(Finland)	Marko Kantele	1
(England)	**Darryl Fitton**	**3**
(Norway)	**Robert Wagner**	**3**
(Netherlands)	Niels de Ruiter	2
(England)	Mick Cummings	1
(Netherlands)	**Michael van Gerwen**	**3**

Round 4 (best of 5 sets)
(England)	Andy Boulton (74.73)	0
(England)	**Martin Adams** (87.03)	**3**
(Netherlands)	**Co Stompé** (86.73)	**3**
(Wales)	Carl Lewis (77.07)	1
(England)	**John Walton** (86.70)	**3**
(Wales)	Paul Cosslett (76.59)	0
(Germany)	Michael Rosenauer (73.32)	0
(England)	**Steve Farmer** (82.62)	**3**
(England)	Phil Nixon (79.26)	1
(Wales)	**Mark Webster** (81.03)	**3**
(England)	**Brian Woods** (91.65)	**3**
(Wales)	Robert Hughes (86.28)	0
(Wales)	Martin Phillips (89.13)	2
(England)	**Darryl Fitton** (90.24)	**3**
(Norway)	Robert Wagner (81.54)	2
(Netherlands)	**Michael van Gerwen** (88.86)	**3**

Quarter-finals (best of 5 sets)
(England)	**Martin Adams** (95.58)	**3**
(Netherlands)	Co Stompé (64.95)	1
(England)	John Walton (83.13)	1
(England)	**Steve Farmer** (85.95)	**3**
(Wales)	**Mark Webster** (101.52)	**3**
(England)	Brian Woods (90.90)	1
(England)	Darryl Fitton (93.06)	1
(Netherlands)	**Michael van Gerwen** (97.20)	**3**

Semi-finals (best of 11 sets)
(England)	**Martin Adams** (103.68)	**6**
(England)	Steve Farmer (93.09)	0
(Wales)	Mark Webster (90.69)	3
(Netherlands)	**Michael van Gerwen** (94.14)	**6**

Final (best of 13 sets)
(England)	Martin Adams (93.69)	5
(Netherlands)	**Michael van Gerwen** (94.50)	**7**

== 2006 Women's Event results ==
Players in bold denote match winners.

Quarter-finals; Best of 7 Legs; Losers £300
1	(England) **Trina Gulliver**	4
(Scotland) Anne Kirk	0
(United States) Stacy Bromberg	2
4	(Netherlands) **Francis Hoenselaar**	4
2	(Netherlands) **Karen Krappen**	4
7	(England) Clare Bywaters	3
6	(Russia) Anastasia Dobromyslova	1
(Netherlands) **Carla Molema**	4

Semi-finals; Best of 7 Legs; Losers £500
1	(England) Trina Gulliver 77.37	2
4	(Netherlands) **Francis Hoenselaar** 82.53	4
2	(Netherlands) **Karen Krappen** 71.25	4
(Netherlands) Carla Molema 67.86	2

Final; Best of 7 Legs; Winner £3,000; Runner-up £1,000
4	(Netherlands) **Francis Hoenselaar** 76.56	4
2	(Netherlands) Karen Krappen 77.94	3

== See also ==
- Winmau World Masters - history of the event
