= 2007 Zuiderduin Masters =

Zuiderduin Masters

Tournament information
- Dates: 7 December 2007 – 9 December 2007
- Venue: Hotel Zuiderduin
- Location: Egmond aan Zee, North Holland
- Country: the Netherlands
- Organisation(s): BDO / WDF
- Format: Legs (group stage); Sets (from quarter-finals); Final – best of 5 Sets
- Prize fund: €33,500
- Winner's share: €5,000

Champion(s)
- (Scotland) Gary Anderson

The 2007 Zuiderduin Masters was a darts tournament held at the Hotel Zuiderduin in Egmond aan Zee, the Netherlands, run by the British Darts Organisation and the World Darts Federation. It was the first edition of the tournament since the sponsorship of the event was taken over by the Hotel Zuiderduin to become the Zuiderduin Masters. A new tournament format was also introduced. It was also the last year the tournament was held as an unranked event and a men's only competition.

The last winner of the event, Mervyn King in 2005 as no event was held in 2006, was absent from the field as he had transferred over to the PDC earlier in the year. Martin Adams, the BDO World Champion, was knocked out in the quarter-finals by Gary Robson. The number one seed Gary Anderson defeated Mark Webster in the final, 5–4 in sets, to win the event for the first time. He added this event to his successes at the International Darts League and the World Darts Trophy in May and September.

== Prize money ==
Position	Money (€)
Winner	€5,000
Runner-up	€2,500
Semi-Finals	€2,000
Quarter-Finals	€1,500
Last 24 Group	€1,000
Total	€33,500

== Qualifying ==
Qualifying Criteria		Player	Ref
BDO World Rankings - Top 20	1	(Scotland) Gary Anderson	
BDO World Rankings - Top 20	2	(Wales) Mark Webster	
BDO World Rankings - Top 20	3	(England) Martin Adams	
BDO World Rankings - Top 20	4	(England) Darryl Fitton	
BDO World Rankings - Top 20	5	(England) Scott Waites	
BDO World Rankings - Top 20	6	(England) Tony O'Shea	
BDO World Rankings - Top 20	7	(Netherlands) Co Stompé	
BDO World Rankings - Top 20	8	(Netherlands) Niels de Ruiter	
BDO World Rankings - Top 20	9	(England) John Walton	
BDO World Rankings - Top 20	10	(England) Martin Atkins	
BDO World Rankings - Top 20	11	(England) Steve West	
BDO World Rankings - Top 20	12	(England) Shaun Greatbatch	
BDO World Rankings - Top 20	13	(England) Gary Robson	
BDO World Rankings - Top 20	14	(England) Ted Hankey	
BDO World Rankings - Top 20	15	(Netherlands) Mario Robbe	
BDO World Rankings - Top 20	16	(Wales) Martin Phillips	
BDO World Rankings - Top 20	17	(Netherlands) Edwin Max	
BDO World Rankings - Top 20	18	(Netherlands) Remco van Eijden	
BDO World Rankings - Top 20	19	(Scotland) Mark Barilli	
BDO World Rankings - Top 20	20	(England) Phil Nixon	
Wildcards		(England) Steve Coote	
Wildcards		(England) Andy Fordham	
Wildcards		(Norway) Robert Wagner	
Wildcards		(Netherlands) Joey ten Berge	

== Results ==
=== Group stage ===
all matches are best of 9 legs.
P = Played; W = Won; L = Lost; LF = Legs for; LA = Legs against; +/- = Leg difference; Pts = Points

Group A

Pos	Name	P	W	L	LF	LA	+/-	Pts
1	(Scotland) Gary Anderson (1)	2	2	0	10	4	+6	4
2	(England) Martin Atkins	2	1	1	8	6	+2	2
3	(Norway) Robert Wagner	2	0	2	2	10	-8	0

Martin Atkins 5–1 Robert Wagner
Gary Anderson 5–1 Robert Wagner
Gary Anderson 5–3 Martin Atkins

Group B

Pos	Name	P	W	L	LF	LA	+/-	Pts
1	(Netherlands) Remco van Eijden	2	2	0	10	2	+8	4
2	(England) Ted Hankey	2	1	1	5	7	-2	2
3	(Netherlands) Niels de Ruiter (8)	2	0	2	4	10	-6	0

Remco van Eijden 5–0 Ted Hankey
Ted Hankey 5–2 Niels de Ruiter
Remco van Eijden 5–2 Niels de Ruiter

Group C

Pos	Name	P	W	L	LF	LA	+/-	Pts
1	(England) Darryl Fitton (4)	2	0	2	10	2	+8	4
2	(England) John Walton	2	1	1	7	8	-1	2
3	(Netherlands) Mario Robbe	2	0	2	3	10	-7	0

John Walton 5–3 Mario Robbe
Darryl Fitton 5–0 Mario Robbe
Darryl Fitton 5–2 John Walton

Group D

Pos	Name	P	W	L	LF	LA	+/-	Pts
1	(England) Steve West	2	2	0	10	4	+6	4
2	(England) Scott Waites (5)	2	1	1	7	9	-2	2
3	(Netherlands) Joey ten Berge	2	0	2	6	10	-4	0

Steve West 5–2 Joey ten Berge
Scott Waites 5–4 Joey ten Berge
Steve West 5–2 Steve West

Group E

Pos	Name	P	W	L	LF	LA	+/-	Pts
1	(England) Martin Adams (3)	2	2	0	10	0	+10	4
2	(England) Phil Nixon	2	1	1	5	8	-3	2
3	(England) Steve Coote	2	0	2	3	10	-7	0

Phil Nixon 5–3 Steve Coote
Martin Adams 5–0 Steve Coote
Martin Adams 5–0 Phil Nixon

Group F

Pos	Name	P	W	L	LF	LA	+/-	Pts
1	(England) Gary Robson	2	1	1	8	7	+1	2
2	(England) Tony O'Shea (6)	2	1	1	8	8	0	2
3	(Wales) Martin Phillips	2	1	1	7	8	-1	2

Martin Phillips 5–3 Tony O'Shea
Tony O'Shea 5–3 Gary Robson
Gary Robson 5–2 Martin Phillips

Group G

Pos	Name	P	W	L	LF	LA	+/-	Pts
1	(Wales) Mark Webster (2)	2	2	0	10	4	+6	4
2	(England) Shaun Greatbatch	2	1	1	8	5	+3	2
3	(Netherlands) Edwin Max	2	0	2	1	10	-9	0

Shaun Greatbatch 5–0 Edwin Max
Mark Webster 5–1 Edwin Max
Mark Webster 5–3 Shaun Greatbatch

Group H

Pos	Name	P	W	L	LF	LA	+/-	Pts
1	(Netherlands) Co Stompé (7)	2	2	0	10	3	+7	4
2	(Scotland) Mark Barilli	2	1	1	8	5	+3	2
3	(England) Andy Fordham	2	0	2	0	10	-10	0

Mark Barilli 5–0 Andy Fordham
Co Stompé 5–0 Andy Fordham
Co Stompé 5–3 Mark Barilli

=== Knockout stages ===
Quarter-Finals; Best of 5 sets		Semi-Finals; Best of 5 sets		Final; Best of 9 sets
(Scotland) Gary Anderson	3
(Netherlands) Remco van Eijden	0	(Scotland) Gary Anderson	3
(England) Darryl Fitton	3	(England) Darryl Fitton	0
(England) Steve West	0			(Scotland) Gary Anderson (100.32)	5
(England) Martin Adams	2			(Wales) Mark Webster (96.45)	4
(England) Gary Robson	3	(England) Gary Robson	0
(Wales) Mark Webster	3	(Wales) Mark Webster	3
(Netherlands) Co Stompé	1
