= Glenn Moody =

English darts player

Personal information
- Nickname: Mr Muscle
- Born: 19 June 1964 (age 62) Middlesbrough, England
- Home town: Acklam, Middlesbrough, England

Sport
- Sport: Darts
- Playing since: 1998
- Darts: 26 Gram
- Laterality: Right-handed
- Walk-on music: Hit That Perfect Beat by Bronski Beat

Organisation (see split in darts)
- BDO: 2000–2010

WDF major events – best performances
- World Championship: Last 16: 2008
- World Masters: Last 192: 2000

PDC premier events – best performances
- UK Open: Last 96: 2005

Glenn Moody (born 19 June 1964) is a former English professional darts player.

== Career ==
Moody had tried to qualify for the Lakeside nine times before finding success in the 2008 BDO World Darts Championship.

He beat Niels de Ruiter, the number sixteen seed, in the first round of the championship by three sets to one. He had a 76.80 average compared to de Ruiter's 74.04 average. This saw him through to the second round where he played Welshman and #1 seed Mark Webster. Webster was the eventual victor, winning by four sets to one. Glenn put up a fight in the match (and, in fact, had several opportunities to win the fourth and fifth sets due to Webster missing many attempts at doubles), coming out with an average of 80.13, just shy of Webster's 82.80. Webster raised his game considerably afterwards and won the title.

Moody has performed well in floor events in 2008, reaching the Last 32 in the Welsh Classic, the Welsh Masters and the British Open. Moody also attempted to qualify for the 2008 Grand Slam of Darts via the ITV Wildcard Qualifiers, but lost in his first match to Erwin Extercatte. Moody then failed to qualify for the 2009 Lakeside World Championship, winning two matches before losing to Paul Gibbs.

In 2010 he won the Worthington Masters.

== Personal life ==
Glenn Moody is married to Lesley, a carer for the local council, and he is a house-husband who looks after son George at home. Due to his skinny build he is ironically nicknamed Mr Muscle.

== World Championship Results ==
=== BDO ===
- 2008: 2nd Round (lost to Mark Webster 1–4)
