= 2008 Grand Slam of Darts =

2008 PartyPoker.com Grand Slam of Darts

Tournament information
- Dates: 15–23 November 2008
- Venue: Wolverhampton Civic Hall
- Location: Wolverhampton
- Country: England
- Organisation(s): PDC
- Format: Legs
- Prize fund: £356,000
- Winner's share: £100,000
- Nine-dart finish: (England) James Wade
- High checkout: 170 (Scotland) Gary Anderson

Champion(s)
- (England) Phil Taylor

The 2008 PartyPoker.com Grand Slam of Darts was the second staging of the darts tournament, the Grand Slam of Darts organised by the Professional Darts Corporation. The event took place from 15 to 23 November 2008 at the Wolverhampton Civic Hall, Wolverhampton, England. As with 2007, the tournament included players from both the PDC and BDO organisations.

Phil Taylor successfully defended the title after defeating Terry Jenkins 18–9 in the final.

James Wade also hit the first nine-dart finish in the history of this tournament, during his second round defeat by Gary Anderson.

== Prize Fund ==
The prize fund for the 2008 tournament was as follows:

Position (num. of players)		Prize money (Total: £356,000)
Winner	(1)	£100,000
Runner-up	(1)	£40,000
Semi-finalists	(2)	£20,000
Quarter-finalists	(4)	£12,500
Last 16 (second round)	(8)	£7,500
Last 32 (group stage)	(16)	£4,000
Highest finish	(1)	£2,000

== Qualifying ==
There were 15 tournaments that provided qualifying opportunities to players. Most tournaments offered a qualifying position for the winner and runner-up of the tournament, however the World Championships and the 2007 Grand Slam also offered a place in the tournament to the losing semi-finalists. There were also various other ways of qualifying for overseas players, including those from Australia and the United States, as well as a wildcard qualifying event open to any darts player.

=== Qualifying tournaments ===
==== PDC ====
Tournament	Year	Position	Player	Qualifiers
Grand Slam of Darts	2007	Winner	(England) Phil Taylor	(England) Phil Taylor (England) Andy Hamilton (England) Kevin McDine (Scotland) Gary Anderson (Netherlands) Raymond van Barneveld (England) Andy Jenkins (Canada) John Part (England) Kirk Shepherd (England) Kevin Painter (England) Wayne Mardle (England) James Wade (England) Terry Jenkins (Netherlands) Vincent van der Voort (United States) Gary Mawson (England) Colin Lloyd (England) Denis Ovens (England) Adrian Lewis
Grand Slam of Darts	2007	Runner-up	(England) Andy Hamilton	(England) Phil Taylor (England) Andy Hamilton (England) Kevin McDine (Scotland) Gary Anderson (Netherlands) Raymond van Barneveld (England) Andy Jenkins (Canada) John Part (England) Kirk Shepherd (England) Kevin Painter (England) Wayne Mardle (England) James Wade (England) Terry Jenkins (Netherlands) Vincent van der Voort (United States) Gary Mawson (England) Colin Lloyd (England) Denis Ovens (England) Adrian Lewis
Grand Slam of Darts	2007	Semi-finalists	(England) Kevin McDine (Scotland) Gary Anderson	(England) Phil Taylor (England) Andy Hamilton (England) Kevin McDine (Scotland) Gary Anderson (Netherlands) Raymond van Barneveld (England) Andy Jenkins (Canada) John Part (England) Kirk Shepherd (England) Kevin Painter (England) Wayne Mardle (England) James Wade (England) Terry Jenkins (Netherlands) Vincent van der Voort (United States) Gary Mawson (England) Colin Lloyd (England) Denis Ovens (England) Adrian Lewis
PDC World Darts Championship	2007	Winner	(Netherlands) Raymond van Barneveld	(England) Phil Taylor (England) Andy Hamilton (England) Kevin McDine (Scotland) Gary Anderson (Netherlands) Raymond van Barneveld (England) Andy Jenkins (Canada) John Part (England) Kirk Shepherd (England) Kevin Painter (England) Wayne Mardle (England) James Wade (England) Terry Jenkins (Netherlands) Vincent van der Voort (United States) Gary Mawson (England) Colin Lloyd (England) Denis Ovens (England) Adrian Lewis
PDC World Darts Championship	2007	Runner-up	(England) Phil Taylor	(England) Phil Taylor (England) Andy Hamilton (England) Kevin McDine (Scotland) Gary Anderson (Netherlands) Raymond van Barneveld (England) Andy Jenkins (Canada) John Part (England) Kirk Shepherd (England) Kevin Painter (England) Wayne Mardle (England) James Wade (England) Terry Jenkins (Netherlands) Vincent van der Voort (United States) Gary Mawson (England) Colin Lloyd (England) Denis Ovens (England) Adrian Lewis
PDC World Darts Championship	2007	Semi-finalists	(England) Andy Jenkins (England) Andy Hamilton	(England) Phil Taylor (England) Andy Hamilton (England) Kevin McDine (Scotland) Gary Anderson (Netherlands) Raymond van Barneveld (England) Andy Jenkins (Canada) John Part (England) Kirk Shepherd (England) Kevin Painter (England) Wayne Mardle (England) James Wade (England) Terry Jenkins (Netherlands) Vincent van der Voort (United States) Gary Mawson (England) Colin Lloyd (England) Denis Ovens (England) Adrian Lewis
PDC World Darts Championship	2008	Winner	(Canada) John Part	(England) Phil Taylor (England) Andy Hamilton (England) Kevin McDine (Scotland) Gary Anderson (Netherlands) Raymond van Barneveld (England) Andy Jenkins (Canada) John Part (England) Kirk Shepherd (England) Kevin Painter (England) Wayne Mardle (England) James Wade (England) Terry Jenkins (Netherlands) Vincent van der Voort (United States) Gary Mawson (England) Colin Lloyd (England) Denis Ovens (England) Adrian Lewis
PDC World Darts Championship	2008	Runner-up	(England) Kirk Shepherd	(England) Phil Taylor (England) Andy Hamilton (England) Kevin McDine (Scotland) Gary Anderson (Netherlands) Raymond van Barneveld (England) Andy Jenkins (Canada) John Part (England) Kirk Shepherd (England) Kevin Painter (England) Wayne Mardle (England) James Wade (England) Terry Jenkins (Netherlands) Vincent van der Voort (United States) Gary Mawson (England) Colin Lloyd (England) Denis Ovens (England) Adrian Lewis
PDC World Darts Championship	2008	Semi-finalists	(England) Kevin Painter (England) Wayne Mardle	(England) Phil Taylor (England) Andy Hamilton (England) Kevin McDine (Scotland) Gary Anderson (Netherlands) Raymond van Barneveld (England) Andy Jenkins (Canada) John Part (England) Kirk Shepherd (England) Kevin Painter (England) Wayne Mardle (England) James Wade (England) Terry Jenkins (Netherlands) Vincent van der Voort (United States) Gary Mawson (England) Colin Lloyd (England) Denis Ovens (England) Adrian Lewis
World Matchplay	2007	Winner	(England) James Wade	(England) Phil Taylor (England) Andy Hamilton (England) Kevin McDine (Scotland) Gary Anderson (Netherlands) Raymond van Barneveld (England) Andy Jenkins (Canada) John Part (England) Kirk Shepherd (England) Kevin Painter (England) Wayne Mardle (England) James Wade (England) Terry Jenkins (Netherlands) Vincent van der Voort (United States) Gary Mawson (England) Colin Lloyd (England) Denis Ovens (England) Adrian Lewis
World Matchplay	2007	Runner-up	(England) Terry Jenkins	(England) Phil Taylor (England) Andy Hamilton (England) Kevin McDine (Scotland) Gary Anderson (Netherlands) Raymond van Barneveld (England) Andy Jenkins (Canada) John Part (England) Kirk Shepherd (England) Kevin Painter (England) Wayne Mardle (England) James Wade (England) Terry Jenkins (Netherlands) Vincent van der Voort (United States) Gary Mawson (England) Colin Lloyd (England) Denis Ovens (England) Adrian Lewis
World Matchplay	2008	Winner	(England) Phil Taylor	(England) Phil Taylor (England) Andy Hamilton (England) Kevin McDine (Scotland) Gary Anderson (Netherlands) Raymond van Barneveld (England) Andy Jenkins (Canada) John Part (England) Kirk Shepherd (England) Kevin Painter (England) Wayne Mardle (England) James Wade (England) Terry Jenkins (Netherlands) Vincent van der Voort (United States) Gary Mawson (England) Colin Lloyd (England) Denis Ovens (England) Adrian Lewis
World Matchplay	2008	Runner-up	(England) James Wade	(England) Phil Taylor (England) Andy Hamilton (England) Kevin McDine (Scotland) Gary Anderson (Netherlands) Raymond van Barneveld (England) Andy Jenkins (Canada) John Part (England) Kirk Shepherd (England) Kevin Painter (England) Wayne Mardle (England) James Wade (England) Terry Jenkins (Netherlands) Vincent van der Voort (United States) Gary Mawson (England) Colin Lloyd (England) Denis Ovens (England) Adrian Lewis
World Grand Prix	2007	Winner	(England) James Wade	(England) Phil Taylor (England) Andy Hamilton (England) Kevin McDine (Scotland) Gary Anderson (Netherlands) Raymond van Barneveld (England) Andy Jenkins (Canada) John Part (England) Kirk Shepherd (England) Kevin Painter (England) Wayne Mardle (England) James Wade (England) Terry Jenkins (Netherlands) Vincent van der Voort (United States) Gary Mawson (England) Colin Lloyd (England) Denis Ovens (England) Adrian Lewis
World Grand Prix	2007	Runner-up	(England) Terry Jenkins	(England) Phil Taylor (England) Andy Hamilton (England) Kevin McDine (Scotland) Gary Anderson (Netherlands) Raymond van Barneveld (England) Andy Jenkins (Canada) John Part (England) Kirk Shepherd (England) Kevin Painter (England) Wayne Mardle (England) James Wade (England) Terry Jenkins (Netherlands) Vincent van der Voort (United States) Gary Mawson (England) Colin Lloyd (England) Denis Ovens (England) Adrian Lewis
World Grand Prix	2008	Winner	(England) Phil Taylor	(England) Phil Taylor (England) Andy Hamilton (England) Kevin McDine (Scotland) Gary Anderson (Netherlands) Raymond van Barneveld (England) Andy Jenkins (Canada) John Part (England) Kirk Shepherd (England) Kevin Painter (England) Wayne Mardle (England) James Wade (England) Terry Jenkins (Netherlands) Vincent van der Voort (United States) Gary Mawson (England) Colin Lloyd (England) Denis Ovens (England) Adrian Lewis
World Grand Prix	2008	Runner-up	(Netherlands) Raymond van Barneveld	(England) Phil Taylor (England) Andy Hamilton (England) Kevin McDine (Scotland) Gary Anderson (Netherlands) Raymond van Barneveld (England) Andy Jenkins (Canada) John Part (England) Kirk Shepherd (England) Kevin Painter (England) Wayne Mardle (England) James Wade (England) Terry Jenkins (Netherlands) Vincent van der Voort (United States) Gary Mawson (England) Colin Lloyd (England) Denis Ovens (England) Adrian Lewis
Las Vegas Desert Classic	2007	Winner	(Netherlands) Raymond van Barneveld	(England) Phil Taylor (England) Andy Hamilton (England) Kevin McDine (Scotland) Gary Anderson (Netherlands) Raymond van Barneveld (England) Andy Jenkins (Canada) John Part (England) Kirk Shepherd (England) Kevin Painter (England) Wayne Mardle (England) James Wade (England) Terry Jenkins (Netherlands) Vincent van der Voort (United States) Gary Mawson (England) Colin Lloyd (England) Denis Ovens (England) Adrian Lewis
Las Vegas Desert Classic	2007	Runner-up	(England) Terry Jenkins	(England) Phil Taylor (England) Andy Hamilton (England) Kevin McDine (Scotland) Gary Anderson (Netherlands) Raymond van Barneveld (England) Andy Jenkins (Canada) John Part (England) Kirk Shepherd (England) Kevin Painter (England) Wayne Mardle (England) James Wade (England) Terry Jenkins (Netherlands) Vincent van der Voort (United States) Gary Mawson (England) Colin Lloyd (England) Denis Ovens (England) Adrian Lewis
Las Vegas Desert Classic	2008	Winner	(England) Phil Taylor	(England) Phil Taylor (England) Andy Hamilton (England) Kevin McDine (Scotland) Gary Anderson (Netherlands) Raymond van Barneveld (England) Andy Jenkins (Canada) John Part (England) Kirk Shepherd (England) Kevin Painter (England) Wayne Mardle (England) James Wade (England) Terry Jenkins (Netherlands) Vincent van der Voort (United States) Gary Mawson (England) Colin Lloyd (England) Denis Ovens (England) Adrian Lewis
Las Vegas Desert Classic	2008	Runner-up	(England) James Wade	(England) Phil Taylor (England) Andy Hamilton (England) Kevin McDine (Scotland) Gary Anderson (Netherlands) Raymond van Barneveld (England) Andy Jenkins (Canada) John Part (England) Kirk Shepherd (England) Kevin Painter (England) Wayne Mardle (England) James Wade (England) Terry Jenkins (Netherlands) Vincent van der Voort (United States) Gary Mawson (England) Colin Lloyd (England) Denis Ovens (England) Adrian Lewis
UK Open	2007	Winner	(Netherlands) Raymond van Barneveld	(England) Phil Taylor (England) Andy Hamilton (England) Kevin McDine (Scotland) Gary Anderson (Netherlands) Raymond van Barneveld (England) Andy Jenkins (Canada) John Part (England) Kirk Shepherd (England) Kevin Painter (England) Wayne Mardle (England) James Wade (England) Terry Jenkins (Netherlands) Vincent van der Voort (United States) Gary Mawson (England) Colin Lloyd (England) Denis Ovens (England) Adrian Lewis
UK Open	2007	Runner-up	(Netherlands) Vincent van der Voort	(England) Phil Taylor (England) Andy Hamilton (England) Kevin McDine (Scotland) Gary Anderson (Netherlands) Raymond van Barneveld (England) Andy Jenkins (Canada) John Part (England) Kirk Shepherd (England) Kevin Painter (England) Wayne Mardle (England) James Wade (England) Terry Jenkins (Netherlands) Vincent van der Voort (United States) Gary Mawson (England) Colin Lloyd (England) Denis Ovens (England) Adrian Lewis
UK Open	2008	Winner	(England) James Wade	(England) Phil Taylor (England) Andy Hamilton (England) Kevin McDine (Scotland) Gary Anderson (Netherlands) Raymond van Barneveld (England) Andy Jenkins (Canada) John Part (England) Kirk Shepherd (England) Kevin Painter (England) Wayne Mardle (England) James Wade (England) Terry Jenkins (Netherlands) Vincent van der Voort (United States) Gary Mawson (England) Colin Lloyd (England) Denis Ovens (England) Adrian Lewis
UK Open	2008	Runner-up	(United States) Gary Mawson	(England) Phil Taylor (England) Andy Hamilton (England) Kevin McDine (Scotland) Gary Anderson (Netherlands) Raymond van Barneveld (England) Andy Jenkins (Canada) John Part (England) Kirk Shepherd (England) Kevin Painter (England) Wayne Mardle (England) James Wade (England) Terry Jenkins (Netherlands) Vincent van der Voort (United States) Gary Mawson (England) Colin Lloyd (England) Denis Ovens (England) Adrian Lewis
US Open	2007	Winner	(England) Phil Taylor	(England) Phil Taylor (England) Andy Hamilton (England) Kevin McDine (Scotland) Gary Anderson (Netherlands) Raymond van Barneveld (England) Andy Jenkins (Canada) John Part (England) Kirk Shepherd (England) Kevin Painter (England) Wayne Mardle (England) James Wade (England) Terry Jenkins (Netherlands) Vincent van der Voort (United States) Gary Mawson (England) Colin Lloyd (England) Denis Ovens (England) Adrian Lewis
US Open	2007	Runner-up	(Netherlands) Raymond van Barneveld	(England) Phil Taylor (England) Andy Hamilton (England) Kevin McDine (Scotland) Gary Anderson (Netherlands) Raymond van Barneveld (England) Andy Jenkins (Canada) John Part (England) Kirk Shepherd (England) Kevin Painter (England) Wayne Mardle (England) James Wade (England) Terry Jenkins (Netherlands) Vincent van der Voort (United States) Gary Mawson (England) Colin Lloyd (England) Denis Ovens (England) Adrian Lewis
US Open	2008	Winner	(England) Phil Taylor	(England) Phil Taylor (England) Andy Hamilton (England) Kevin McDine (Scotland) Gary Anderson (Netherlands) Raymond van Barneveld (England) Andy Jenkins (Canada) John Part (England) Kirk Shepherd (England) Kevin Painter (England) Wayne Mardle (England) James Wade (England) Terry Jenkins (Netherlands) Vincent van der Voort (United States) Gary Mawson (England) Colin Lloyd (England) Denis Ovens (England) Adrian Lewis
US Open	2008	Runner-up	(England) Colin Lloyd	(England) Phil Taylor (England) Andy Hamilton (England) Kevin McDine (Scotland) Gary Anderson (Netherlands) Raymond van Barneveld (England) Andy Jenkins (Canada) John Part (England) Kirk Shepherd (England) Kevin Painter (England) Wayne Mardle (England) James Wade (England) Terry Jenkins (Netherlands) Vincent van der Voort (United States) Gary Mawson (England) Colin Lloyd (England) Denis Ovens (England) Adrian Lewis
Premier League Darts	2007	Winner	(England) Phil Taylor	(England) Phil Taylor (England) Andy Hamilton (England) Kevin McDine (Scotland) Gary Anderson (Netherlands) Raymond van Barneveld (England) Andy Jenkins (Canada) John Part (England) Kirk Shepherd (England) Kevin Painter (England) Wayne Mardle (England) James Wade (England) Terry Jenkins (Netherlands) Vincent van der Voort (United States) Gary Mawson (England) Colin Lloyd (England) Denis Ovens (England) Adrian Lewis
Premier League Darts	2007	Runner-up	(England) Terry Jenkins	(England) Phil Taylor (England) Andy Hamilton (England) Kevin McDine (Scotland) Gary Anderson (Netherlands) Raymond van Barneveld (England) Andy Jenkins (Canada) John Part (England) Kirk Shepherd (England) Kevin Painter (England) Wayne Mardle (England) James Wade (England) Terry Jenkins (Netherlands) Vincent van der Voort (United States) Gary Mawson (England) Colin Lloyd (England) Denis Ovens (England) Adrian Lewis
Premier League Darts	2008	Winner	(England) Phil Taylor	(England) Phil Taylor (England) Andy Hamilton (England) Kevin McDine (Scotland) Gary Anderson (Netherlands) Raymond van Barneveld (England) Andy Jenkins (Canada) John Part (England) Kirk Shepherd (England) Kevin Painter (England) Wayne Mardle (England) James Wade (England) Terry Jenkins (Netherlands) Vincent van der Voort (United States) Gary Mawson (England) Colin Lloyd (England) Denis Ovens (England) Adrian Lewis
Premier League Darts	2008	Runner-up	(England) James Wade	(England) Phil Taylor (England) Andy Hamilton (England) Kevin McDine (Scotland) Gary Anderson (Netherlands) Raymond van Barneveld (England) Andy Jenkins (Canada) John Part (England) Kirk Shepherd (England) Kevin Painter (England) Wayne Mardle (England) James Wade (England) Terry Jenkins (Netherlands) Vincent van der Voort (United States) Gary Mawson (England) Colin Lloyd (England) Denis Ovens (England) Adrian Lewis
German Darts Championship	2007	Winner	(England) Phil Taylor	(England) Phil Taylor (England) Andy Hamilton (England) Kevin McDine (Scotland) Gary Anderson (Netherlands) Raymond van Barneveld (England) Andy Jenkins (Canada) John Part (England) Kirk Shepherd (England) Kevin Painter (England) Wayne Mardle (England) James Wade (England) Terry Jenkins (Netherlands) Vincent van der Voort (United States) Gary Mawson (England) Colin Lloyd (England) Denis Ovens (England) Adrian Lewis
German Darts Championship	2007	Runner-up	(England) Denis Ovens	(England) Phil Taylor (England) Andy Hamilton (England) Kevin McDine (Scotland) Gary Anderson (Netherlands) Raymond van Barneveld (England) Andy Jenkins (Canada) John Part (England) Kirk Shepherd (England) Kevin Painter (England) Wayne Mardle (England) James Wade (England) Terry Jenkins (Netherlands) Vincent van der Voort (United States) Gary Mawson (England) Colin Lloyd (England) Denis Ovens (England) Adrian Lewis
European Championship	2008	Winner	(England) Phil Taylor	(England) Phil Taylor (England) Andy Hamilton (England) Kevin McDine (Scotland) Gary Anderson (Netherlands) Raymond van Barneveld (England) Andy Jenkins (Canada) John Part (England) Kirk Shepherd (England) Kevin Painter (England) Wayne Mardle (England) James Wade (England) Terry Jenkins (Netherlands) Vincent van der Voort (United States) Gary Mawson (England) Colin Lloyd (England) Denis Ovens (England) Adrian Lewis
European Championship	2008	Runner-up	(England) Adrian Lewis	(England) Phil Taylor (England) Andy Hamilton (England) Kevin McDine (Scotland) Gary Anderson (Netherlands) Raymond van Barneveld (England) Andy Jenkins (Canada) John Part (England) Kirk Shepherd (England) Kevin Painter (England) Wayne Mardle (England) James Wade (England) Terry Jenkins (Netherlands) Vincent van der Voort (United States) Gary Mawson (England) Colin Lloyd (England) Denis Ovens (England) Adrian Lewis
Championship League Darts	2008	Winner	(England) Phil Taylor	(England) Phil Taylor (England) Andy Hamilton (England) Kevin McDine (Scotland) Gary Anderson (Netherlands) Raymond van Barneveld (England) Andy Jenkins (Canada) John Part (England) Kirk Shepherd (England) Kevin Painter (England) Wayne Mardle (England) James Wade (England) Terry Jenkins (Netherlands) Vincent van der Voort (United States) Gary Mawson (England) Colin Lloyd (England) Denis Ovens (England) Adrian Lewis
Note: Players in italics had already qualified for the tournament.				(England) Phil Taylor (England) Andy Hamilton (England) Kevin McDine (Scotland) Gary Anderson (Netherlands) Raymond van Barneveld (England) Andy Jenkins (Canada) John Part (England) Kirk Shepherd (England) Kevin Painter (England) Wayne Mardle (England) James Wade (England) Terry Jenkins (Netherlands) Vincent van der Voort (United States) Gary Mawson (England) Colin Lloyd (England) Denis Ovens (England) Adrian Lewis

==== BDO ====
For the second year running, Martin Adams declined his invitation to take part in the competition.

Tournament	Year	Position	Player	Qualifiers
BDO World Darts Championship	2007	Winner	~~(England) Martin Adams~~	(England) Phill Nixon (Netherlands) Niels de Ruiter (England) Mervyn King (Wales) Mark Webster (Australia) Simon Whitlock (England) Brian Woods (Netherlands) Michael van Gerwen (Scotland) Robert Thornton (England) Darryl Fitton
BDO World Darts Championship	2007	Runner-up	(England) Phill Nixon	(England) Phill Nixon (Netherlands) Niels de Ruiter (England) Mervyn King (Wales) Mark Webster (Australia) Simon Whitlock (England) Brian Woods (Netherlands) Michael van Gerwen (Scotland) Robert Thornton (England) Darryl Fitton
BDO World Darts Championship	2007	Semi-finalists	(Netherlands) Niels de Ruiter (England) Mervyn King	(England) Phill Nixon (Netherlands) Niels de Ruiter (England) Mervyn King (Wales) Mark Webster (Australia) Simon Whitlock (England) Brian Woods (Netherlands) Michael van Gerwen (Scotland) Robert Thornton (England) Darryl Fitton
BDO World Darts Championship	2008	Winner	(Wales) Mark Webster	(England) Phill Nixon (Netherlands) Niels de Ruiter (England) Mervyn King (Wales) Mark Webster (Australia) Simon Whitlock (England) Brian Woods (Netherlands) Michael van Gerwen (Scotland) Robert Thornton (England) Darryl Fitton
BDO World Darts Championship	2008	Runner-up	(Australia) Simon Whitlock	(England) Phill Nixon (Netherlands) Niels de Ruiter (England) Mervyn King (Wales) Mark Webster (Australia) Simon Whitlock (England) Brian Woods (Netherlands) Michael van Gerwen (Scotland) Robert Thornton (England) Darryl Fitton
BDO World Darts Championship	2008	Semi-finalists	~~(England) Martin Adams~~ (England) Brian Woods	(England) Phill Nixon (Netherlands) Niels de Ruiter (England) Mervyn King (Wales) Mark Webster (Australia) Simon Whitlock (England) Brian Woods (Netherlands) Michael van Gerwen (Scotland) Robert Thornton (England) Darryl Fitton
World Masters	2006	Winner	(Netherlands) Michael van Gerwen	(England) Phill Nixon (Netherlands) Niels de Ruiter (England) Mervyn King (Wales) Mark Webster (Australia) Simon Whitlock (England) Brian Woods (Netherlands) Michael van Gerwen (Scotland) Robert Thornton (England) Darryl Fitton
World Masters	2006	Runner-up	~~(England) Martin Adams~~	(England) Phill Nixon (Netherlands) Niels de Ruiter (England) Mervyn King (Wales) Mark Webster (Australia) Simon Whitlock (England) Brian Woods (Netherlands) Michael van Gerwen (Scotland) Robert Thornton (England) Darryl Fitton
World Masters	2007	Winner	(Scotland) Robert Thornton	(England) Phill Nixon (Netherlands) Niels de Ruiter (England) Mervyn King (Wales) Mark Webster (Australia) Simon Whitlock (England) Brian Woods (Netherlands) Michael van Gerwen (Scotland) Robert Thornton (England) Darryl Fitton
World Masters	2007	Runner-up	(England) Darryl Fitton	(England) Phill Nixon (Netherlands) Niels de Ruiter (England) Mervyn King (Wales) Mark Webster (Australia) Simon Whitlock (England) Brian Woods (Netherlands) Michael van Gerwen (Scotland) Robert Thornton (England) Darryl Fitton
Note: Players in italics had already qualified for the tournament.				(England) Phill Nixon (Netherlands) Niels de Ruiter (England) Mervyn King (Wales) Mark Webster (Australia) Simon Whitlock (England) Brian Woods (Netherlands) Michael van Gerwen (Scotland) Robert Thornton (England) Darryl Fitton

==== Defunct Tournaments ====
Tournament	Year	Position	Player
International Darts League	2007	Winner	(Scotland) Gary Anderson
International Darts League	2007	Runner-up	(Wales) Mark Webster
World Darts Trophy	2007	Winner	(Scotland) Gary Anderson
World Darts Trophy	2007	Runner-up	(England) Phil Taylor
Note: Players in italics had already qualified for the tournament.

==== Other qualifiers ====
Criteria	Player
PDC North America Order of Merit Leader	(United States) Darin Young
William Cross Pro-Am	(Australia) Paul Nicholson
2008 BDO Women's World Darts Champion	(Russia) Anastasia Dobromyslova
ITV Wildcards	(England) Wes Newton (Northern Ireland) Colin McGarry (England) Alan Tabern

== Pro-Celebrity Challenge ==
As a curtain-raiser for the main Grand Slam of Darts, a competition involving eight celebrities and eight of the professionals taking part in the Grand Slam took place on the Friday before the tournament. The winners of the tournament collected a first prize of £8,000. In a closely fought final, James Wade and Steve Backley won a final-leg decider over Phil Taylor and Neil Ruddock, with Backley's double two checkout sealing the victory. Those involved were:

- (Canada) John Part
- (Netherlands) Raymond van Barneveld
- (Russia) Anastasia Dobromyslova
- (England) Wayne Mardle
- (England) Phil Taylor
- (England) James Wade
- (England) Peter Manley
- (Wales) Mark Webster
- (Republic of Ireland) Barry McGuigan – former world boxing champion
- (England) Phil Tufnell – former cricketer
- (England) Steve Davis – six-time world snooker champion
- (England) Michael Le Vell – actor
- (England) Neil Ruddock – former footballer
- (England) Steve Backley – former athlete
- (England) Dave Ulliott – poker player
- (England) Mike Tindall – rugby player

=== Draw and results ===
all matches first-to-3/best of 5.

Quarter-finals		Semi-finals		Final
Part/McGuigan	0
Mardle/Le Vell	3	Mardle/Le Vell	1
Taylor/Ruddock	3	Taylor/Ruddock	3
Dobromyslova/Davis	1			Taylor/Ruddock	2
Wade/Backley	3			Wade/Backley	3
Manley/Ulliott	1	Wade/Backley	3
van Barneveld/Tufnell	3	van Barneveld/Tufnell	0
Webster/Tindall	2

== Draw ==
=== Group stages ===
All matches first-to-5/best of 9.

NB in Brackets: Number = Seeds; BDO = BDO Darts player; Q = Qualifier
NB: P = Played; W = Won; L = Lost; LF = Legs for; LA = Legs against; +/- = Plus/minus record, in relation to legs; Average = 3-dart average; Pts = Points.

==== Group A ====
POS	Player	P	W	L	LF	LA	+/-	Pts	Status
1	(England) Phil Taylor (1)	3	2	1	14	6	+8	4	Advance to the last 16
2	(England) Andy Jenkins	3	2	1	13	13	0	4	Advance to the last 16
3	(Netherlands) Vincent van der Voort	3	1	2	10	11	−1	2	Eliminated
4	(England) Phill Nixon (BDO)	3	1	2	6	13	−7	2	Eliminated

15 November

107.36 Phil Taylor (England)	5 – 0	(England) Phill Nixon 92.91
85.30 Vincent van der Voort (Netherlands)	4 – 5	(England) Andy Jenkins 85.39

16 November

99.98 Vincent van der Voort (Netherlands)	5 – 1	(England) Phill Nixon 85.33
102.94 Phil Taylor (England)	4 – 5	(England) Andy Jenkins 96.89

17 November

85.05 Andy Jenkins (England)	3 – 5	(England) Phill Nixon 87.79
92.21 Vincent van der Voort (Netherlands)	1 – 5	(England) Phil Taylor 104.51

==== Group B ====
POS	Player	P	W	L	LF	LA	+/-	Pts	Status
1	(Australia) Simon Whitlock (BDO)	3	2	1	13	6	+7	4	Advance to the last 16
2	(England) Andy Hamilton (8)	3	2	1	11	9	+2	4	Nine Dart Shootout
2	(England) Alan Tabern (Q)	3	2	1	11	9	+2	4	Nine Dart Shootout
4	(England) Brian Woods (BDO)	3	0	3	4	15	−11	0	Eliminated

15 November

105.64 Andy Hamilton (England)	5 – 3	(England) Brian Woods 88.67
91.21 Alan Tabern (England)	5 – 3	(Australia) Simon Whitlock 89.73

16 November

82.83 Brian Woods (England)	0 – 5	(Australia) Simon Whitlock 84.44
95.94 Andy Hamilton (England)	5 – 1	(England) Alan Tabern 94.57

17 November

90.61 Alan Tabern (England)	5 – 1	(England) Brian Woods 73.63
98.86 Simon Whitlock (Australia)	5 – 1	(England) Andy Hamilton 103.04

===== Nine-dart shootout =====
With Andy Hamilton and Alan Tabern finishing level on points and leg difference, a piece of history was made, with a nine-dart shootout between the two to see who would play Phil Taylor in the second round. The match took place after the conclusion of Tuesday's second round matches.

POS	Player	1	2	3	4	5	6	7	8	9	Pts	Status
2	(England) Andy Hamilton	60	60	5	60	20	60	–	–	–	265	Advance to the last 16
3	(England) Alan Tabern	60	20	5	20	1	20	3	20	20	169	Eliminated

==== Group C ====
POS	Player	P	W	L	LF	LA	+/-	Pts	Status
1	(England) Mervyn King	3	3	0	15	7	+8	6	Advance to the last 16
2	(Wales) Mark Webster (BDO, 4)	3	1	2	12	10	+2	2	Advance to the last 16
3	(Northern Ireland) Colin McGarry (Q)	3	1	2	9	14	−5	2	Eliminated
4	(Netherlands) Michael van Gerwen	3	1	2	6	11	−5	2	Eliminated

15 November

85.80 Mark Webster (Wales)	4 – 5	(Northern Ireland) Colin McGarry 80.14
92.93 Mervyn King (England)	5 – 1	(Netherlands) Michael van Gerwen 86.74

16 November

93.93 Mark Webster (Wales)	5 – 0	(Netherlands) Michael van Gerwen 75.62
80.23 Colin McGarry (Northern Ireland)	3 – 5	(England) Mervyn King 89.81

17 November

84.51 Michael van Gerwen (Netherlands)	5 – 1	(Northern Ireland) Colin McGarry 76.55
97.14 Mervyn King (England)	5 – 3	(Wales) Mark Webster 92.21

==== Group D ====
POS	Player	P	W	L	LF	LA	+/-	Pts	Status
1	(Canada) John Part (5)	3	2	1	13	7	+6	4	Advance to the last 16
2	(England) Kevin McDine	3	2	1	11	7	+4	4	Advance to the last 16
3	(England) Wayne Mardle	3	2	1	10	12	−2	4	Eliminated
4	(Russia) Anastasia Dobromyslova (BDO)	3	0	3	7	15	−8	0	Eliminated

15 November

78.22 John Part (Canada)	5 – 1	(Russia) Anastasia Dobromyslova 75.91
91.21 Wayne Mardle (England)	0 – 5	(England) Kevin McDine 89.73

16 November

79.28 Wayne Mardle (England)	5 – 4	(Russia) Anastasia Dobromyslova 86.07
92.11 John Part (Canada)	5 – 1	(England) Kevin McDine 80.10

17 November

95.44 Wayne Mardle (England)	5 – 3	(Canada) John Part 94.47
92.44 Kevin McDine (England)	5 – 2	(Russia) Anastasia Dobromyslova 80.30

==== Group E ====
POS	Player	P	W	L	LF	LA	+/-	Pts	Status
1	(Netherlands) Raymond van Barneveld (2)	3	3	0	15	7	+8	6	Advance to the last 16
2	(Scotland) Robert Thornton	3	2	1	13	12	+1	4	Advance to the last 16
3	(United States) Gary Mawson	3	1	2	11	10	+1	2	Eliminated
4	(England) Kirk Shepherd	3	0	3	5	15	−10	0	Eliminated

15 November

84.02 Robert Thornton (Scotland)	5 – 3	(United States) Gary Mawson 81.72
100.38 Raymond van Barneveld (Netherlands)	5 – 1	(England) Kirk Shepherd 82.73

16 November

81.68 Gary Mawson (United States)	5 – 0	(England) Kirk Shepherd 74.90
101.38 Raymond van Barneveld (Netherlands)	5 – 3	(Scotland) Robert Thornton 97.82

18 November

93.25 Raymond van Barneveld (Netherlands)	5 – 3	(United States) Gary Mawson 94.63
89.66 Kirk Shepherd (England)	4 – 5	(Scotland) Robert Thornton 93.49

==== Group F ====
POS	Player	P	W	L	LF	LA	+/-	Pts	Status
1	(England) Terry Jenkins (7)	3	2	1	14	8	+6	4	Advance to the last 16
2	(United States) Darin Young (Q)	3	2	1	13	11	+2	4	Advance to the last 16
3	(England) Wes Newton (Q)	3	2	1	10	12	−2	4	Eliminated
4	(England) Colin Lloyd	3	0	3	9	15	−6	0	Eliminated

15 November

92.95 Terry Jenkins (England)	4 – 5	(United States) Darin Young 92.43
83.38 Colin Lloyd (England)	4 – 5	(England) Wes Newton 79.51

16 November

85.61 Terry Jenkins (England)	5 – 3	(England) Colin Lloyd 84.38
85.30 Darin Young (United States)	3 – 5	(England) Wes Newton 82.38

18 November

80.83 Wes Newton (England)	0 – 5	(England) Terry Jenkins 98.88
88.15 Darin Young (United States)	5 – 2	(England) Colin Lloyd 82.25

==== Group G ====
POS	Player	P	W	L	LF	LA	+/-	Pts	Status
1	(England) James Wade (3)	3	3	0	15	7	+8	6	Advance to the last 16
2	(England) Denis Ovens	3	2	1	13	7	+6	4	Advance to the last 16
3	(England) Adrian Lewis	3	1	2	10	10	0	2	Eliminated
4	(Netherlands) Niels de Ruiter (BDO)	3	0	3	1	15	−14	0	Eliminated

15 November

83.40 Adrian Lewis (England)	2 – 5	(England) Denis Ovens 89.48
86.10 James Wade (England)	5 – 1	(Netherlands) Niels de Ruiter 74.91

16 November

89.46 Adrian Lewis (England)	5 – 0	(Netherlands) Niels de Ruiter 84.36
95.83 Denis Ovens (England)	3 – 5	(England) James Wade 111.03

18 November

86.12 Niels de Ruiter (Netherlands)	0 – 5	(England) Denis Ovens 90.54
97.39 James Wade (England)	5 – 3	(England) Adrian Lewis 97.83

==== Group H ====
POS	Player	P	W	L	LF	LA	+/-	Pts	Status
1	(England) Darryl Fitton (BDO)	3	2	1	14	9	+5	4	Advance to the last 16
2	(Scotland) Gary Anderson (BDO, 6)	3	2	1	14	11	+3	4	Advance to the last 16
3	(Australia) Paul Nicholson (Q)	3	1	2	11	14	−3	2	Eliminated
4	(England) Kevin Painter	3	1	2	9	14	−5	2	Eliminated

15 November

84.50 Kevin Painter (England)	2 – 5	(England) Darryl Fitton 86.08
92.32 Gary Anderson (Scotland)	4 – 5	(Australia) Paul Nicholson 86.91

16 November

85.40 Kevin Painter (England)	2 – 5	(Scotland) Gary Anderson 96.40
96.92 Darryl Fitton (England)	5 – 2	(Australia) Paul Nicholson 93.90

18 November

90.72 Gary Anderson (Scotland)	5 – 4	(England) Darryl Fitton 84.08
87.11 Paul Nicholson (Australia)	4 – 5	(England) Kevin Painter 98.05

=== Knockout stages ===
Second round (best of 19 legs); 19–20 November
A1	(England) Phil Taylor (1) 97.37	10
B2	(England) Andy Hamilton (8) 98.30	8
B1	(Australia) Simon Whitlock (BDO) 89.93	10
A2	(England) Andy Jenkins 85.86	8
C1	(England) Mervyn King 88.04	10
D2	(England) Kevin McDine 90.80	9
D1	(Canada) John Part (5) 83.68	2
C2	(Wales) Mark Webster (BDO, 4) 91.73	10
E1	(Netherlands) Raymond van Barneveld (2) 95.14	10
F2	(United States) Darin Young (Q) 84.59	4
F1	(England) Terry Jenkins (7) 93.43	10
E2	(Scotland) Robert Thornton 93.30	8
G1	(England) James Wade (3) 89.98	8
H2	(Scotland) Gary Anderson (BDO, 6) 95.16	10
H1	(England) Darryl Fitton (BDO) 94.71	10
G2	(England) Denis Ovens 91.89	8

Quarter-finals (best of 19 legs); 21 November
A1	(England) Phil Taylor (1) 103.52	10
B1	(Australia) Simon Whitlock (BDO) 97.73	7
C1	(England) Mervyn King 100.98	10
C2	(Wales) Mark Webster (BDO, 4) 94.28	8
E1	(Netherlands) Raymond van Barneveld (2) 97.18	9
F1	(England) Terry Jenkins (7) 96.48	10
H2	(Scotland) Gary Anderson (BDO, 6) 98.45	10
H1	(England) Darryl Fitton (BDO) 88.80	6

Semi-finals (best of 31 legs); 22 November
A1	(England) Phil Taylor (1) 106.56	16
C1	(England) Mervyn King 96.66	10
F1	(England) Terry Jenkins (7) 102.30	16
H2	(Scotland) Gary Anderson (BDO, 6) 105.65	14

Final (best of 35 legs); 23 November
A1	(England) Phil Taylor (1) 106.25	18
F1	(England) Terry Jenkins (7) 100.92	9

== Statistics ==
Player	Played	Legs Won	Legs Lost	100+	140+	180s	High checkout	3-dart average
(England) Phil Taylor	7	68	40	126	99	32	151	104.10
(England) Andy Hamilton	4	19	19	53	33	9	136	100.22
(Scotland) Gary Anderson	6	48	41	101	74	30	170	98.65
(Netherlands) Raymond van Barneveld	5	34	21	73	33	19	121	98.15
(England) Terry Jenkins	7	59	57	144	99	36	164	97.63
(England) James Wade	4	23	17	54	34	10	141	95.09
(England) Mervyn King	6	45	40	108	61	24	161	94.70
(Australia) Simon Whitlock	5	30	24	72	32	14	109	92.84
(Scotland) Robert Thornton	4	21	22	56	30	12	126	92.71
(England) Denis Ovens	4	21	17	63	25	3	122	92.10
(England) Alan Tabern	3	11	9	26	19	4	71	92.04
(Netherlands) Vincent van der Voort	3	10	11	30	14	5	146	91.47
(England) Adrian Lewis	3	10	10	26	11	5	127	90.69
(England) Darryl Fitton	5	30	27	56	44	13	117	90.58
(England) Kevin Painter	3	9	14	25	19	5	91	90.08
(Wales) Mark Webster	5	30	22	70	26	9	158	89.98
(Australia) Paul Nicholson	3	11	14	29	23	5	140	88.93
(England) Phill Nixon	3	6	13	24	15	1	68	88.36
(England) Kevin McDine	4	20	17	40	15	10	107	88.14
(England) Andy Jenkins	4	21	23	56	24	7	104	87.87
(United States) Darin Young	4	17	21	48	24	8	86	87.25
(Canada) John Part	4	15	17	33	12	4	135	86.93
(United States) Gary Mawson	3	11	10	27	9	4	152	86.63
(England) Kirk Shepherd	3	5	15	22	11	1	70	83.89
(England) Colin Lloyd	3	9	15	33	13	2	90	83.38
(England) Wayne Mardle	3	10	12	27	8	2	158	83.23
(Netherlands) Michael van Gerwen	3	6	11	20	7	3	52	82.68
(England) Brian Woods	3	4	15	16	9	6	120	82.19
(Russia) Anastasia Dobromyslova	3	7	15	42	10	0	120	81.46
(Netherlands) Niels de Ruiter	3	1	15	25	5	2	73	81.37
(England) Wes Newton	3	10	12	27	10	1	100	80.85
(Northern Ireland) Colin McGarry	3	9	14	32	14	0	100	79.23

== Television coverage ==
ITV Sport again broadcast coverage throughout the championship, in the UK. Again, Matt Smith presented the coverage on ITV4, with analysis from Chris Mason and Alan Warriner-Little, commentary from Peter Drury, Stuart Pyke and John Rawling and reports from Ned Boulting and Janie Omorogbe.

== Match fixing allegations ==
Five days after the tournament concluded, the PDC revealed that the organisation had received complaints concerning the Group H match between Darryl Fitton and Gary Anderson, and forwarded those complaints to the Darts Regulation Authority. On 26 January 2009 it was announced that there was no evidence of player collusion in the arranging of match outcomes.
