= 2008 BDO World Darts Championship =

Tournament information
- Dates: 5–13 January 2008
- Venue: Lakeside Country Club
- Location: Frimley Green, Surrey
- Country: England, United Kingdom
- Organisation(s): BDO
- Format: Sets; Finals: best of 13 (men's) best of 3 (women's)
- Prize fund: £258,000
- Winner's share: £85,000 (men's) £6,000 (women's)
- High checkout: Men's: (Scotland) Robert Thornton (170) (Netherlands) Co Stompé (170); Women's: (Netherlands) K. Krappen (116)

Champion(s)
- (Wales) Mark Webster (Russia) Anastasia Dobromyslova

The 2008 BDO World Darts Championship (known for sponsorship reasons as the 2008 Lakeside World Professional Darts Championship) was the 31st World Championship staged by the British Darts Organisation and was held between 5–13 January 2008 at the Lakeside Country Club, Frimley Green, Surrey.

Martin Adams attempted to defend the title that he won at the 14th attempt in 2007 but he lost in the Semi-Finals to Mark Webster. Webster won the World Championship, beating Simon Whitlock 7–5 in the final.

Anastasia Dobromyslova won the Women's World Championship, becoming the first player to beat Trina Gulliver in the World Championship. Gulliver had won all of the previous seven titles.

== Prize money ==
The prize fund for the 2008 event is £258,000

Men's Champion: £85,000
Runner-up: £30,000
Semi-Finalists: £11,000 x 2
Quarter-Finalists: £6,000 x 4
Second Round: £4,250 x 8
First Round: £3,000 x 16

Women's Champion: £6,000
Runner-Up £2,000
Semi-Finalists: £1,000 x 2
Quarter-Finalists: £500 x 4

Nine dart finish: £52,000 (Men & Women)
Highest Checkout: £3,000 (Men & Women)

== Seeds ==
Men

1. (Wales) Mark Webster
2. (Scotland) Gary Anderson
3. (England) Scott Waites
4. (England) Martin Adams
5. (England) Tony O'Shea
6. (Netherlands) Co Stompé
7. (England) Ted Hankey
8. (England) Gary Robson
9. (England) Darryl Fitton
10. (England) Martin Atkins
11. (England) Brian Woods
12. (England) John Walton
13. (England) Shaun Greatbatch
14. (Netherlands) Mario Robbe
15. (Netherlands) Edwin Max
16. (Netherlands) Niels de Ruiter

Women

1. (Netherlands) Francis Hoenselaar
2. (England) Trina Gulliver
3. (Netherlands) Karin Krappen
4. (Russia) Anastasia Dobromyslova

== Men's ==
- Match distances in sets are quoted in brackets at the top of each round. All sets best of five legs, unless there is a final set tie-break

First Round (best of 5 sets)
1	(Wales) Mark Webster (94.47)	3
(England) Ian Jones (85.29)	1
16	(Netherlands) Niels de Ruiter (74.04)	1
(England) Glenn Moody (76.80)	3
8	(England) Gary Robson (80.43)	3
(Australia) Tony David (76.77)	1
9	(England) Darryl Fitton (94.86)	3
(England) Davy Richardson (89.81)	1
5	(England) Tony O'Shea (78.72)	3
(England) Steve Farmer (81.78)	2
12	(England) John Walton (85.26)	0
(Scotland) Robert Thornton (89.28)	3
4	(England) Martin Adams (90.54)	3
(England) Phill Nixon (77.61)	0
13	(England) Shaun Greatbatch (87.03)	1
(Wales) Martin Phillips (91.41)	3
2	(Scotland) Gary Anderson (88.56)	2
(Netherlands) Fabian Roosenbrand (84.33)	3
15	(Netherlands) Edwin Max (77.46)	0
(Australia) Simon Whitlock (86.40)	3
7	(England) Ted Hankey (85.92)	3
(England) Steve West (82.53)	2
10	(England) Martin Atkins (85.80)	2
(England) Andy Boulton (82.56)	3
6	(Netherlands) Co Stompé (90.06)	3
(Canada) Carl Mercer (78.54)	1
11	(England) Brian Woods (96.51)	3
(Scotland) Paul Hanvidge (86.13)	0
3	(England) Scott Waites (87.78)	3
(Scotland) Mike Veitch (83.82)	1
14	(Netherlands) Mario Robbe (78.51)	1
(Netherlands) Remco van Eijden (85.05)	3

Second round (best of 7)
1	(Wales) Mark Webster (82.80)	4
(England) Glenn Moody (80.13)	1
8	(England) Gary Robson (88.77)	0
9	(England) Darryl Fitton (100.71)	4
5	(England) Tony O'Shea (89.58)	2
(Scotland) Robert Thornton (91.92)	4
4	(England) Martin Adams (89.19)	4
(Wales) Martin Phillips (83.61)	0
(Netherlands) Fabian Roosenbrand (82.86)	1
(Australia) Simon Whitlock (89.37)	4
7	(England) Ted Hankey (88.29)	4
(England) Andy Boulton (82.14)	1
6	(Netherlands) Co Stompé (88.98)	2
11	(England) Brian Woods (88.98)	4
3	(England) Scott Waites (87.06)	4
(Netherlands) Remco van Eijden (85.23)	2

Quarter-Finals (best of 9)
1	(Wales) Mark Webster (92.67)	5
9	(England) Darryl Fitton (93.18)	1
(Scotland) Robert Thornton (92.25)	4
4	(England) Martin Adams (89.88)	5
(Australia) Simon Whitlock (94.68)	5
7	(England) Ted Hankey (86.73)	0
11	(England) Brian Woods (93.21)	5
3	(England) Scott Waites (90.30)	3

Semi-Finals (best of 11)
1	(Wales) Mark Webster (96.21)	6
4	(England) Martin Adams (95.37)	4
(Australia) Simon Whitlock (92.64)	6
11	(England) Brian Woods (89.10)	3

Final (best of 13)
1	(Wales) Mark Webster (92.07)	7
(Australia) Simon Whitlock (93.93)	5

== Statistics ==
Player	Played	Sets Won	Sets Lost	Legs Won	Legs Lost	100+	140+	180s	High Checkout	3-dart Average
(Wales) Mark Webster	5	25	12	85	67	188	98	39	141	92.28
(England) Ian Jones	1	1	3	6	11	18	11	3	118	85.29
(Netherlands) Niels de Ruiter	1	1	3	7	11	27	7	0	40	74.04
(England) Glenn Moody	2	4	5	18	19	61	17	1	121	80.87
(England) Darryl Fitton	3	8	6	35	22	83	38	16	156	95.43
(England) Davy Richardson	1	1	3	4	11	27	11	1	67	89.91
(England) Gary Robson	2	3	5	12	16	37	19	2	135	84.16
(Australia) Tony David	1	1	3	4	10	25	2	0	68	76.77
(England) Tony O'Shea	2	5	6	19	24	64	26	7	161	84.55
(England) Steve Farmer	1	2	3	9	10	27	9	3	114	81.78
(England) John Walton	1	0	3	3	9	15	10	1	36	85.26
(Scotland) Robert Thornton	3	11	7	43	32	153	75	20	170	91.65
(England) Shaun Greatbatch	1	1	3	4	10	24	9	1	121	87.03
(Wales) Martin Phillips	2	3	5	16	16	57	20	4	161	86.98
(England) Martin Adams	4	16	10	61	52	184	82	20	128	91.88
(England) Phill Nixon	1	0	3	3	9	18	5	0	112	77.61
(England) Scott Waites	3	10	7	39	32	118	45	5	121	88.58
(Scotland) Mike Veitch	1	1	3	5	11	16	11	2	116	83.82
(Netherlands) Mario Robbe	1	1	3	9	10	24	10	2	120	78.51
(Netherlands) Remco van Eijden	2	5	5	18	25	47	24	9	84	85.15
(England) Brian Woods	4	15	11	63	45	148	67	21	132	91.08
(Scotland) Paul Hanvidge	1	0	3	3	9	16	5	2	61	83.43
(Netherlands) Co Stompé	2	5	4	19	18	40	26	5	170	89.30
(Canada) Carl Mercer	1	0	3	2	9	13	5	2	69	78.54
(England) Ted Hankey	3	7	8	31	28	65	40	13	138	86.96
(England) Steve West	1	2	3	8	12	19	14	3	81	82.53
(England) Martin Atkins	1	2	3	10	12	34	12	3	96	85.80
(England) Andy Boulton	2	4	6	17	24	51	20	4	127	82.37
(Netherlands) Edwin Max	1	0	3	6	9	19	7	0	149	77.46
(Australia) Simon Whitlock	5	23	11	79	57	182	82	36	145	92.14
(Scotland) Gary Anderson	1	2	3	10	10	14	23	5	120	88.56
(Netherlands) Fabian Roosenbrand	2	4	6	15	23	36	28	6	124	83.65

== Women's Championship ==
First Round – Best of 3 sets
4	(Russia) Anastasia Dobromyslova 78.30	3	3
(England) Dee Bateman 69.72	2	0
1	(Netherlands) Francis Hoenselaar 53.19	1	0
(England) Stephanie Smee 63.21	3	3
3	(Netherlands) Karin Krappen 66.48	3	0	3
(Netherlands) Rilana Erades 64.80	2	3	0
2	(England) Trina Gulliver 78.33	3	2	3
(Wales) Julie Gore 68.01	0	3	0

Semi-Finals – Best of 3 sets
4	(Russia) Anastasia Dobromyslova 77.07	3	3
(England) Stephanie Smee 68.49	0	0
3	(Netherlands) Karin Krappen 67.86	1	1
2	(England) Trina Gulliver 73.62	3	3

Final – Best of 3 sets
4	(Russia) Anastasia Dobromyslova 81.54	3	3
2	(England) Trina Gulliver 71.64	2	0

== Women's statistics ==
Player	Played	Sets Won	Sets Lost	Legs Won	Legs Lost	100+	140+	180s	High Checkout	3-dart Average
(Russia) Anastasia Dobromyslova	3	6	0	18	4	32	16	1	94	79.07
(England) Dee Bateman	1	0	2	2	6	9	2	0	40	69.72
(Netherlands) Francis Hoenselaar	1	0	2	1	6	6	2	1	40	53.19
(England) Stephanie Smee	2	2	2	6	7	21	4	0	101	65.36
(Netherlands) Karin Krappen	2	2	3	8	11	22	7	2	116	67.01
(Netherlands) Rilana Erades	1	1	2	5	6	7	4	1	40	64.80
(England) Trina Gulliver	3	4	3	16	11	27	15	4	103	75.02
(Wales) Julie Gore	1	1	2	3	8	15	2	0	52	68.01

== Television coverage ==
The tournament was covered by the BBC in the UK, SBS6 in the Netherlands and Eurosport across continental Europe.
