= Darryl Fitton =

English darts player

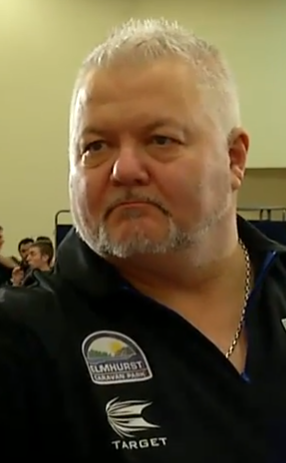
- Fitton in 2016

Personal information
- Nickname: "The Dazzler"
- Born: 5 May 1962 (age 64) Stockport, Cheshire, England
- Home town: Urmston, Greater Manchester

Sport
- Sport: Darts
- Playing since: 1978
- Darts: 25g Target
- Laterality: Right-handed
- Walk-on music: "One Step Beyond" by Madness preceded by opening from "Sunshine of Your Love" by Cream

Organisation (see split in darts)
- BDO: 2000–2020
- PDC: 1997
- WDF: 2000–2020

WDF major events – best performances
- World Championship: Semi Final: 2005, 2009, 2017
- World Masters: Runner Up: 2007
- World Trophy: Winner (1): 2016
- Int. Darts League: Semi Final: 2004
- Finder Masters: Winner (1): 2009
- Dutch Open: Winner (1): 2009

PDC premier events – best performances
- World Matchplay: Last 32: 1997
- Grand Slam: Quarter Final: 2008

WSDT major events – best performances
- World Championship: Quarter Final: 2023

Other tournament wins
- Tournament: Years
- Belgium Open British Classic British Open Dutch Open England Ch'ship German Open Greek Open Isle of Man Open Luxembourg Open Police Masters Polish Open Welsh Classic: 2006; 2004; 2003; 2009; 2010; 2014; 2011; 2009; 2016; 2013; 2011; 2006

Other achievements
- Hemeco Open Rosmalen 2010; Open Paradiso 2012; Vonderke Masters 2008

Darryl Fitton (born 5 May 1962) is an English former professional darts player. He was nicknamed The Dazzler and worked as an undertaker before embarking on his darts career. Fitton won the 2009 Finder Masters and the 2016 BDO World Trophy. He was also a three-time BDO World Championship semi-finalist, the runner-up at the 2007 World Masters, and a quarter-finalist at the 2008 Grand Slam of Darts.

== Darts career ==
Fitton's first TV appearance was against Peter Manley in the 1997 PDC World Matchplay. However, he lost 8–6, and has not made another PDC appearance since.

Fitton debuted in the BDO World Championship in 2003 as a qualifier, but lost 1–3 to fellow qualifier John Burton in the first round. In 2004, he returned to Lakeside, again hitting a 180 score with his very first turn. He reached the quarter-finals before being beaten by Andy Fordham, who went on to win the title. The following year, he reached the semi-finals, this time losing out to Raymond van Barneveld in a hard-fought 5–3 scoreline, as van Barneveld went on to win the title that year. After that, Darryl did not win a match at the World Championship for the next two years, losing to Martin Adams and Phill Nixon in the first round of the 2006 and 2007 championships respectively. Fitton did reach the final of the Winmau World Masters in 2007, leading Robert Thornton 5–2 before Thornton hit back to win 7–5.

In the 2008 World Championship, Fitton got beyond the first round for the first time since 2005 when he bossed his match against Davy Richardson, running out a 3–1 winner with a 94.86 average. In the second round he put in one of the most dominant performances of the World Championship when he averaged over 100 in a 4-0 hammering of Gary Robson. However he lost 5–1 in the quarter-finals to number-one seed (and eventual champion) Mark Webster.

Darryl is known as a consistently high scorer, he once held the record for best average in a full, televised match. His 6–0 win against Davy Richardson in the 2004 International Darts League saw him hit a three-dart average of 114.15. This was, at the time, the highest three-dart average on a televised tournament.

Fitton reached the semi-finals of the 2009 BDO World Championship, beating Mark Salmon in the first round and then defeated 12th seed Simon Whitlock in round two. He followed up with a 5–4 win over fourth seed Scott Waites before bowing out to his friend Tony O'Shea in a 6–4 defeat. Fitton then claimed the 2009 Dutch Open title, beating Willy van de Wiel in the final and then the Isle of Man Open title, beating World Champion Ted Hankey in the final.

Fitton won the 2009 Zuiderduin Masters beating Martin Adams in the final 5–2. He also achieved the magic nine dart finish against Ross Montgomery and was given £4,000 which he donated to a local Charity. In the 2010 BDO World Championship, he was beaten by eventual finalist Dave Chisnall 3–1 in the first round.

Fitton also lost in the first round at Lakeside in 2011, 3–0 against second seed Stuart Kellett winning just one leg. Fitton managed to retain some form later in the year by reaching his second Zuiderduin Masters final, where he narrowly lost to Scott Waites having had two darts to win. However, Fitton would once again lose in the first round at Lakeside in 2012 losing 3–1 against fourth seed Robbie Green.

After a quiet 2012 season, Fitton entered the 2013 BDO World Darts Championship as the 16th seed. He narrowly defeated Benito van de Pas 3–2 in the first round to secure his first win at Lakeside since 2009. He then caused a big upset by defeating top seed Stephen Bunting 4–2 in the second round. In the quarter-final, Fitton was defeated 5–2 by Wesley Harms. Fitton's form improved after this but his 2014 World Championship was ended in the first round by Tony Eccles, in Eccles's last tournament before being convicted of child grooming. The following year, Fitton reached the quarter-finals again beating previous year's runner-up Alan Norris en route, before losing to Glen Durrant.

In 2015, Fitton hit a nine-dart finish in the Dutch Open final against Martin Adams, although he ended up losing the match. He also reached the final of the Jersey Open losing to Scott Mitchell.

In the 2016 BDO World Darts Championship, seeded seventh, Fitton was defeated 3–2 in the first round by Dennis Harbour.

After that, he won the 2016 BDO World Trophy by defeating Peter Machin in the final 13–9. With this win, Fitton qualified for the 2016 Grand Slam of Darts.

Fitton was knocked out of the 2018 BDO World Darts Championship in the second round, losing to Glen Durrant 4–1.

=== PDC ===
Fitton confirmed on his Facebook his intention to switch to the Professional Darts Corporation for the 2018 season, and he entered the 2018 Q-School in an attempt to win a Tour Card.

=== BDO ===
He rejoined the British Darts Organisation and competed in the Dutch Open. He reached the last 16 and got beaten by Dave Parletti.

== World Championship Results ==
=== BDO ===
- 2003: First round (lost to John Burton 1–3)
- 2004: Quarter-finals (lost to Andy Fordham 4–5)
- 2005: Semi-finals (lost to Raymond van Barneveld 3–5)
- 2006: First round (lost to Martin Adams 1–3)
- 2007: First round (lost to Phill Nixon 1–3)
- 2008: Quarter-finals (lost to Mark Webster 1–5)
- 2009: Semi-finals (lost to Tony O'Shea 4–6)
- 2010: First round (lost to Dave Chisnall 1–3)
- 2011: First round (lost to Stuart Kellett 0–3)
- 2012: First round (lost to Robbie Green 1–3)
- 2013: Quarter-finals (lost to Wesley Harms 2–5)
- 2014: First round (lost to Tony Eccles 1–3)
- 2015: Quarter-finals (lost to Glen Durrant 2–5)
- 2016: First round (lost to Dennis Harbour 2–3)
- 2017: Semi-finals (lost to Danny Noppert 3–6)
- 2018: Second round (lost to Glen Durrant 1–4)

=== WSDT ===
- 2022: First round (lost to Richie Howson 2–3)
- 2023: Quarter-finals (lost to Leonard Gates 1–3)
- 2024: First round (lost to Chris Mason 1–3)
- 2025: Second round (lost to Robert Thornton 1–3)

== Career statistics ==
Key
| W | F | SF | QF | #R | RR | Prel. | DNQ | DNP | NH |

(W) Won; (F) finalist; (SF) semifinalist; (QF) quarterfinalist; (#R) rounds 6, 5, 4, 3, 2, 1; (RR) round-robin stage; (Prel.) Preliminary round; (DNQ) Did not qualify; (DNP) Did not participate; (NH) Not held

=== Performance timeline ===
| Tournament | 1997 | 1998 | 1999 | 2000 | 2001 | 2002 | 2003 | 2004 | 2005 | 2006 | 2007 | 2008 | 2009 | 2010 | 2011 | 2012 | 2013 | 2014 | 2015 | 2016 | 2017 | 2018 | 2019 |
|---|---|---|---|---|---|---|---|---|---|---|---|---|---|---|---|---|---|---|---|---|---|---|---|
| BDO World Championship | DNP | | | | | | 1R | QF | SF | 1R | 1R | QF | SF | 1R | 1R | 1R | QF | 1R | QF | 1R | SF | 2R | DNP |
| BDO World Trophy | Not held | | | | | | | | | | | | | | | | | 2R | 2R | W | 1R | DNQ | |
| International Darts League | Not held | | | | | | RR | SF | QF | RR | QF | Not held | | | | | | | | | | | |
| World Darts Trophy | Not held | | | | | DNP | 2R | 2R | QF | 2R | 1R | Not held | | | | | | | | | | | |
| World Masters | DNP | | | 4R | DNP | 2R | 3R | 1R | QF | QF | F | 6R | 6R | 5R | 2R | 4R | SF | 5R | 6R | QF | 5R | DNP | |
| Zuiderduin Masters | Not held | | | DNP | | | RR | RR | QF | NH | SF | QF | W | RR | F | RR | RR | QF | QF | DNP | | | NH |
| World Matchplay | 1R | DNP | | | | | | | | | | | | | | | | | | | | | |
| Grand Slam of Darts | Not held | | | | | | | | | | DNQ | QF | RR | RR | DNQ | | | | | 2R | DNQ | | |

=== BDO major finals: 4 (2 title, 2 runners-up) ===
Legend
Winmau World Masters (0–1)
Zuiderduin Masters (1–1)
BDO World Trophy (1–0)

| Outcome | No. | Year | Championship | Opponent in the final | Score (Note: (l) = score in legs, (s) = score in sets.) |
|---|---|---|---|---|---|
| Runner-up | 1. | 2007 | Winmau World Masters | (Scotland) Robert Thornton | 5–7 (s) |
| Winner | 1. | 2009 | Zuiderduin Masters | (England) Martin Adams | 4–2 (s) |
| Runner-up | 2. | 2011 | Zuiderduin Masters | (England) Scott Waites | 4–5 (s) |
| Winner | 1. | 2016 | BDO World Trophy | (Australia) Peter Machin | 13–9 (l) |

=== Nine-dart finishes ===
Darryl Fitton televised nine-dart finishes
| Date | Opponent | Tournament | Method | Prize |
|---|---|---|---|---|
| 13 December 2009 | (Scotland) Ross Montgomery | Zuiderduin Masters | 2 x T20, T19; 3 x T20; 2 x T20, D12 | |
| 2 February 2015 | (England) Martin Adams | Dutch Open | 3 x T20; 3 x T20; T20, T19, D12 | |

=== High averages ===
Darryl Fitton's televised average of 114.15 was the world record until Phil Taylor broke it at the 2008 UK Open.

Darryl Fitton televised high averages
| Average | Date | Opponent | Tournament | Stage | Score |
|---|---|---|---|---|---|
| 114.15 | May 2004 | (England) Davy Richardson | 2004 International Darts League | Last 32 group | 6–0 (l) |

Records
| Preceded by Phil Taylor | World record highest televised average 9 May 2005 – 7 June 2008 | Succeeded by Phil Taylor |
