= Niels de Ruiter =

Dutch darts player

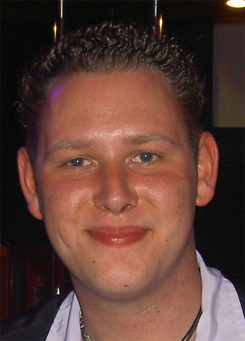
- De Ruiter in 2005

Personal information
- Nickname: "The Excellent Dude"
- Born: 21 January 1983 (age 43) Lelystad, Netherlands
- Home town: Nieuwegein, Netherlands

Sport
- Sport: Darts
- Playing since: 1999
- Darts: 25g John Part
- Laterality: Right-handed
- Walk-on music: "Enter Sandman" by Metallica

Organisation (see split in darts)
- BDO: 2004–2009
- PDC: 2003

WDF major events – best performances
- World Championship: Semi Final: 2007
- World Masters: Last 32: 2004, 2005, 2006
- World Trophy: Quarter Final: 2006
- Int. Darts League: Quarter Final: 2005
- Finder Masters: Last 24 Group: 2005, 2007

PDC premier events – best performances
- Grand Slam: Group Stages 2007, 2008

Other tournament wins
- Tournament: Years
- WDF Europe Cup Team: 2006

Niels de Ruiter (born 21 January 1983) is a Dutch former darts player and former chairman of the Dutch Darts Federation. On the darts circuit, his nickname is The Excellent Dude, which is a reference from the film Bill & Ted's Excellent Adventure. He is also known for using Metallica's "Enter Sandman" as his walk-on music, which he plays air guitar as he enters the stage.

== Career ==
De Ruiter began playing darts in 1999, but it wasn't until 2005 de Ruiter became popular in the BDO circuit when he reached the semi-finals of the Welsh Open and the Welsh Classic. De Ruiter made his World Championship debut in the 2006 Lakeside World Championship, but lost in the first round to Shaun Greatbatch. De Ruiter was runner-up to Welshman Mark Webster in the 2006 WDF Europe Cup. In the 2007 World Championships, held at the Lakeside, De Ruiter made an excellent run by reaching the semi-finals, narrowly losing 6–4 in sets to the late Phill Nixon who would later finish runner-up to eventual champion Martin Adams. In the 2008 World Championships, De Ruiter was eliminated in the first round, losing to Englishman Glenn Moody.

De Ruiter played very few tournaments during early stages of 2008 due to vertigo and quit darts for three months until he came back to the game. He recovered and returned to the sport during the latter stages of the year to participate in the 2008 Grand Slam of Darts. De Ruiter was drawn in a tough group consisting of James Wade, Adrian Lewis and Denis Ovens. He only won a single leg during the three group matches and suffered two whitewash losses to Lewis and Ovens. De Ruiter then failed to qualify for the 2009 BDO World Darts Championship and also for the last 16 stage of the World Masters.

In 2012, De Ruiter returned to the Lakeside having failed to qualify, but having overseen a record eight Dutch players reaching the televised stages. Due to his fluent English, De Ruiter became a translator for one of these players, Christian Kist. Kist made an exceptional run by winning the tournament. De Ruiter has failed to qualify for any major tournaments since.

== World Championship results ==
=== BDO ===
- 2006: 1st Round (lost to Shaun Greatbatch 2–3)
- 2007: Semi-Finals (lost to Phill Nixon 4–6)
- 2008: 1st Round (lost to Glenn Moody 1–3)

== Career finals ==
=== WDF major finals: 1 (1 runner-up) ===
Outcome	No.	Year	Championship	Opponent in the final	Score
Runner-up	1.	2006	Europe Cup Singles	(England) Mark Webster	3–4 (s)

== Performance timeline ==
Tournament	2004	2005	2006	2007	2008
BDO World Championship	DNQ		1R	SF	1R
International Darts League	DNQ	QF	L32G	L32G	NH
World Darts Trophy	DNQ	2R	QF	1R	NH
Winmau World Masters	L32	L32	L32	DNP	L136
Finder Darts Masters	DNQ	RR	NH	RR	DNQ

Performance Table Legend
DNP	Did not play at the event	DNQ	Did not qualify for the event	NYF	Not yet founded	L#	lost in the early rounds of the tournament (WR = Wildcard round, RR = Round robin)
QF	lost in the quarter-finals	SF	lost in the semi-finals	F	lost in the final	W	won the tournament
