= Phill Nixon =

English darts player (1956–2013)

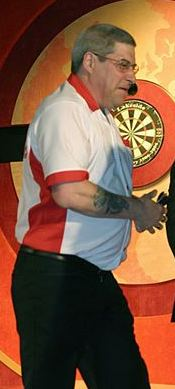
- Nixon in 2007

Personal information
- Nicknames: "Nixy" "The Ferryhill Flyer"
- Born: 13 March 1956 County Durham, England
- Died: 9 August 2013 (aged 57) Ferryhill, County Durham, England

Sport
- Sport: Darts
- Playing since: 1976
- Darts: 24g RedDragon
- Laterality: right-handed
- Walk-on music: "We Will Rock You" by Queen

Organisation (see split in darts)
- BDO: 1987, 1999–2012

WDF major events – best performances
- World Championship: Runner-up: 2007
- World Masters: Quarter-final: 2002, 2012
- World Trophy: Last 56: 2007
- Int. Darts League: Preliminary Round: 2007
- Finder Masters: Last 24 Group: 2007

PDC premier events – best performances
- Grand Slam: Group Stages: 2007, 2008

Other tournament wins
- Tournament: Years
- Mill Rythe Darts Festival: 2004
- Updated on 9 August 2013

Phillip Nixon (13 March 1956 – 9 August 2013) was an English darts player from Ferryhill, County Durham. He was the runner up in the 2007 BDO World Darts Championship in his first appearance.

== Career ==
Before the 2007 BDO World Darts Championship, Nixon's best performances came in reaching the quarter-finals of the 2002 Winmau World Masters and the semi-final of the 2004 British Open. After 20 years of attempting, 2007 was the first year Nixon had managed to qualify for the BDO World Darts Championship. Bookmakers had him as a 150–1 shot to win the title, before the event had started. Nixon came through three separate qualifying competitions at county, national and international level to secure his Lakeside debut. He beat number 7 seed Darryl Fitton, number 10 seed Martin Atkins and number 15 seed Paul Hanvidge to the reach the semi-finals and beat Dutchman Niels de Ruiter the number 11 seed for a place in the final against top seed Martin Adams.

He trailed 0–6 in sets at the interval. During the break whilst practising in the players lounge with a cigarette in one hand, Nixon was said to have stabbed himself deliberately in his legs to try and motivate himself. After the interval he found form and gradually reduced the deficit. Adams missed four doubles to win the championship as Nixon gradually pulled back to level the match at 6–6, taking it to a final set. In the decider, Nixon missed a dart at double seven to win the first leg, and a further missed dart at double eighteen in the third leg gave Adams his chance to take his first world title. Nixon won £30,000 for his appearance in the final. After his run at Lakeside, he went on to reach the final of the Isle of Man Open (losing to Gary Robson) and the quarter-final of the Swiss Open.

On his return to Lakeside for the 2008 BDO World Championship he was drawn to face Adams again, in a repeat of their final from twelve months earlier, but this time lost 0–3. His form remained steady during 2008, reaching the quarter-finals of the Dutch Open and British Open and his debut at the Grand Slam of Darts saw him lose 4–5 to James Wade in his first group game. He then defeated Niels de Ruiter, but allowed a 4–0 lead and a total of eight match darts slip and lost 5–4 to Pat Orreal, failing to qualify for the knockout stages. Nixon was also knocked out at the Group Stage of the 2008 Grand Slam of Darts, losing to Phil Taylor and Vincent van der Voort but defeated Andy Jenkins though it was too late for Nixon to qualify.

Despite reaching the quarter-finals of the 2008 Dutch Open and British Open, he fell down the BDO rankings and didn't automatically qualify for the 2009 World Championship. He was back in his position from 2007 of having to win at least five matches to qualify for the event and lost to Henny van der Ster. He also failed to qualify for the 2010, 2011, 2012 and 2013 BDO World Darts Championship.

He did, however, reach the quarter-finals of the Winmau World Masters in 2012, losing to Wesley Harms ten years after his previous appearance in the last eight of the tournament. It would be his last appearance at a major tournament.

== Personal life ==
Phill was married to Suzanne (born 1969), they had been married for three years (together for eleven) at the time of his world final appearance in 2007. They had two children, although Phill had eight in total.

At the start of the tournament, Nixon's prime occupation was as a house husband. He began to concentrate on his darts to a greater degree when he was made redundant.

== Cancer and death ==
Nixon was diagnosed with cancer of the liver, lung and stomach in June 2013. He died on 9 August 2013. Both the BDO and the PDC paid tribute to Nixon after his death. His funeral was held on 23 August 2013.

== World Championship results ==
=== BDO ===
- 2007: Runner-up (lost to Martin Adams 6–7)
- 2008: 1st round (lost to Martin Adams 0–3)

== Career finals ==
=== BDO major finals: 1 (1 runner-up) ===
Outcome	No.	Year	Championship	Opponent in the final	Score (Note: (l) = score in legs, (s) = score in sets.)
Runner-up	1.	2007	BDO World Darts Championship	(England) Martin Adams	6–7 (s)

== Performance timeline ==
Tournament	1999	2000	2001	2002	2003	2004	2005	2006	2007	2008	2009	2010	2011	2012
BDO World Championship	DNQ								F	1R	DNQ			
Winmau World Masters	3R	Prel.	2R	QF	2R	DNP	3R	5R	(Note: Played at the Grand Slam of Darts)	3R	4R	1R	DNP	QF
Zuiderduin Masters	NH	DNP						NH	RR	DNP				
World Darts Trophy	Not held			DNP					Prel.	Not held				
International Darts League	Not held				DNP				Prel.	Not held				
Grand Slam of Darts	Not held								RR	RR	DNQ			

Performance Table Legend
DNP	Did not play at the event	DNQ	Did not qualify for the event	NYF	Not yet founded	#R	lost in the early rounds of the tournament (WR = Wildcard round, RR = Round robin)
QF	lost in the quarter-finals	SF	lost in the semi-finals	F	lost in the final	W	won the tournament
