= Mario Robbe =

Dutch darts player

Personal information
- Nickname: "The Dutch Robot"
- Born: 23 August 1973 (age 53) Tilburg, Netherlands
- Home town: Goirle, Netherlands

Sport
- Sport: Darts
- Playing since: 1994
- Darts: 23 Gram
- Laterality: Right-handed
- Walk-on music: "Everytime We Touch" by Cascada

Organisation (see split in darts)
- BDO: 2003–2008, 2014–2016
- PDC: 2016–

WDF major events – best performances
- World Championship: Last 32: 2007, 2008
- World Masters: Last 24: 2007
- World Trophy: Last 32: 2005
- Int. Darts League: Last 32 Group: 2004, 2005, 2007
- Finder Masters: Last 24 Group: 2007

PDC premier events – best performances
- UK Open: Last 96: 2019

Other tournament wins
- Tournament: Years
- Spring Cup Glencarn International Classic WDF World Cup Pairs: 2006; 2007 2007

Mario Robbe (born 23 August 1973) is a Dutch professional darts player.

== Career ==
Robbe made his BDO World Darts Championship debut in 2007, where he lost in the first round to Ted Hankey. He returned to Lakeside in 2008, but lost again in the first round to fellow Dutchman Remco van Eijden.

== World Championship results ==
=== BDO ===
- 2007: 1st Round (lost to Ted Hankey 0–3)
- 2008: 1st Round (lost to Remco van Eijden 1–3)
