= Shaun Greatbatch =

English darts player (1969–2022)

Personal information
- Nickname: "Nine Dart Man"
- Born: 13 July 1969 Newmarket, Suffolk, England
- Died: 5 June 2022 (aged 52)
- Home town: Lakenheath, Suffolk, England

Sport
- Sport: Darts
- Playing since: 1985
- Darts: 23,5 Gram Datadart Signature
- Laterality: Right-handed
- Walk-on music: "Town Called Malice" by The Jam

Organisation (see split in darts)
- BDO: 1996–2010

WDF major events – best performances
- World Championship: Semi-final: 2006
- World Masters: Last 32: 2006
- World Trophy: Last 16: 2004, 2007
- Int. Darts League: Quarter-final: 2003
- Finder Masters: Quarter-final: 2005
- Dutch Open: Winner (1): 2002

PDC premier events – best performances
- Grand Slam: Group Stage: 2007

Other tournament wins
- Tournament: Years
- Swedish Open German Open Pairs Denmark Open England National Championship: 2004, 2007; 2004; 2005; 2006, 2007
- Updated on 5 May 2019

Shaun Greatbatch (13 July 1969 – 5 June 2022) was an English professional darts player. He lived in Suffolk and worked in the construction industry. His nickname was Nine Dart Man, having been the first player to hit a perfect nine-dart finish on live television, in the final of the 2002 Dutch Open against Steve Coote.

== Darts career ==
Shaun's family is said by commentators to have a rich darting pedigree. His Welsh mother, Sandra, reached the semi-finals of the Women's World Championship in 2002 and was a Women's World Masters finalist in 1992 and 1997. Shaun lost in the first round of the BDO World Darts Championship in his first four occasions, 2001 against then reigning champion Ted Hankey, in 2003 against Colin Monk, 2004 against James Wade and 2005 against Mike Veitch. This dubious honour ended in the 2006 World Championship, where Shaun finally won in five sets against Niels de Ruiter. He went on to reach the semi-finals, losing to eventual champion Jelle Klaasen. The result meant he did not need to qualify for the 2007 championship where he lost in the second round to Tony Eccles. In 2008 the first round jinx came back to haunt him as he was beaten by Martin Phillips.

== Personal life ==
On 14 June 2008, it was announced that Shaun had been diagnosed with multiple myeloma. As a result of his treatment, he lost all of his hair, weighed two stone lighter and was four inches shorter (going from 6'5" to 6'1"). Despite his illness, he still managed to play in the 2009 BDO World Darts Championship, having earned enough ranking points to claim one of the automatic spots for the events. He was soundly beaten in the first round 3–0 by John Walton, but his mere presence under such difficult circumstances showed great bravery and generated praise from fellow players and fans. He emotionally left the Lakeside stage to a guard of honour made up of the rest of the players in the tournament male and female, as well as officials, referees and former finalist Dave Whitcombe.

Greatbatch died on 5 June 2022, aged 52.

== World Championship results ==
=== BDO ===
- 2001: 1st Round (lost to Ted Hankey 0–3)
- 2003: 1st Round (lost to Colin Monk 0–3)
- 2004: 1st Round (lost to James Wade 1–3)
- 2005: 1st Round (lost to Mike Veitch 2–3)
- 2006: Semi-Final (lost to Jelle Klaasen 3–6)
- 2007: 2nd Round (lost to Tony Eccles 0–4)
- 2008: 1st Round (lost to Martin Phillips 1–3)
- 2009: 1st Round (lost to John Walton 0–3)

== Nine-dart finishes ==
Shaun Greatbatch hit the first ever live broadcast nine-dart finish in the final of the Dutch Open on 3 February 2002.

Shaun Greatbatch televised nine-dart finishes
Date	Opponent	Tournament	Method	Prize
3 February 2002	(England) Steve Coote	Dutch Open	3 x T20; 3 x T20; T20, T15, D18	
