= 2005 World Darts Trophy =

World Darts Trophy

Tournament information
- Dates: 3 December 2005 – 11 December 2005
- Venue: De Vechtsebanen
- Location: Utrecht, Utrecht
- Country: the Netherlands
- Organisation(s): BDO / WDF
- Format: Men; Sets; Final – Best of 11 Sets; Women; Sets; Final – Best of 5 Sets
- High checkout: 164 (England) Gary Robson

Champion(s)
- (England) Gary Robson (men) (Netherlands) Karin Krappen (women)

The 2005 Bavaria World Darts Trophy was the fourth edition of the World Darts Trophy, a professional darts tournament held at the De Vechtsebanen in Utrecht, the Netherlands, run by the British Darts Organisation and the World Darts Federation.

The 2004 winner and BDO World Champion, Raymond van Barneveld was knocked out in straight sets in the second round by Martin Atkins in the men's event. In the final, Gary Robson defeated Mervyn King, 6–4 in sets, winning his only major title to date. Karin Krappen beat Trina Gulliver, the BDO World Champion, in the semi-finals and Francis Hoenselaar, the 2004 winner and in her third straight final, in the final to win the women's event, 3–1 in sets. This was the last year for the women's event.

== Seeds ==
Men

1. (Netherlands) Raymond van Barneveld
2. (England) Martin Adams
3. (England) Mervyn King
4. (England) Ted Hankey
5. (England) Tony West
6. (England) Tony O'Shea
7. (Netherlands) Vincent van der Voort
8. (England) Tony Eccles

== Prize money ==
=== Men ===
Pos	Money (Euros)
Winner	45,000
Runner-up	22,500
Semi-Finals	11,250
Quarter-Finals	6,000
Last 16	3,000
Last 32	2,000

== Men's tournament ==
First round Best of 5 sets
(England) Gary Robson	3
(Australia) Tony David	2
(England) Stephen Bunting	1
(England) Tony Eccles	3
(Netherlands) R van Barneveld	3
(Scotland) Gary Anderson	2
(England) Paul Hogan	0
(England) Martin Atkins	3
(England) John Walton	3
(Netherlands) Co Stompé	0
(Netherlands) Andre Brantjes	1
(England) Ted Hankey	3
(England) Tony West	3
(England) Andy Fordham	0
(New Zealand) Robert Grant	1
(Scotland) Mike Veitch	3
(England) Martin Adams	3
(Denmark) Brian Buur	1
(Netherlands) Mario Robbe	2
(Netherlands) Niels de Ruiter	3
(Netherlands) Vincent van der Voort	3
(Finland) Marko Kantele	1
(Norway) Robert Wagner	0
(England) Darryl Fitton	3
(Netherlands) Mareno Michels	3
(England) Tony Martin	1
(England) Tony O'Shea	0
(Australia) Simon Whitlock	3
(Scotland) Paul Hanvidge	3
(Denmark) Per Laursen	2
(England) Shaun Greatbatch	2
(England) Mervyn King	3

Second round Best of 5 sets
(England) Gary Robson	3
(England) Tony Eccles	2
(Netherlands) Raymond van Barneveld	0
(England) Martin Atkins	3
(England) John Walton	3
(England) Ted Hankey	2
(England) Tony West	0
(Scotland) Mike Veitch	3
(England) Martin Adams	3
(Netherlands) Niels de Ruiter	1
(Netherlands) Vincent van der Voort	1
(England) Darryl Fitton	3
(Netherlands) Mareno Michels	3
(Australia) Simon Whitlock	1
(Scotland) Paul Hanvidge	1
(England) Mervyn King	3

Quarter-Finals; Best of 9 sets
(England) Gary Robson	5
(England) Martin Atkins	1
(England) John Walton	4
(Scotland) Mike Veitch	5
(England) Martin Adams	5
(England) Darryl Fitton	2
(Netherlands) Mareno Michels	2
(England) Mervyn King	5

Semi-Finals; Best of 9 sets
(England) Gary Robson	5
(Scotland) Mike Veitch	0
(England) Martin Adams	1
(England) Mervyn King	5

Final; Best of 11 sets
(England) Gary Robson	6
(England) Mervyn King	4

== Women's tournament ==
Quarter-Finals; Best of 3 sets		Semi-Finals; Best of 3 sets		Final; Best of 5 sets
(Netherlands) Karin Krappen	2
(Netherlands) Mieke de Boer	0	(Netherlands) Karin Krappen	2
(Russia) Anastasia Dobromyslova	0	(England) Trina Gulliver	0
(England) Trina Gulliver	2			(Netherlands) Karin Krappen	3
(Wales) Jan Robbins	2			(Netherlands) Francis Hoenselaar	1
(England) Crissy Manley	1	(Wales) Jan Robbins	1
(England) Clare Bywaters	0	(Netherlands) Francis Hoenselaar	2
(Netherlands) Francis Hoenselaar	2

== Television coverage ==
The tournament was broadcast by SBS6 in the Netherlands, but was not shown in the UK. An internet feed from SBS was available. However, this may be restricted to the Netherlands only due to contractual restrictions.
