= 2003 World Darts Trophy =

World Darts Trophy

Tournament information
- Dates: 6 December 2003 – 14 December 2003
- Venue: De Vechtsebanen
- Location: Utrecht, Utrecht
- Country: the Netherlands
- Organisation(s): BDO / WDF
- Format: Men; Sets; Final – Best of 11 Sets; Women; Sets; Final – Best of 5 Sets
- High checkout: 164 (England) Darryl Fitton

Champion(s)
- (Netherlands) Raymond van Barneveld (men) (England) Trina Gulliver (women)

The 2003 World Darts Trophy was the second edition of the World Darts Trophy, a professional darts tournament held at the De Vechtsebanen in Utrecht, the Netherlands, run by the British Darts Organisation and the World Darts Federation.

The 2002 winner, Tony David was beaten in the semi-finals by, the BDO World Champion and the eventual winner, Raymond van Barneveld in the men's event. Van Barneveld then beat Mervyn King in the final, 6–2 in sets. In the women's event, Mieke de Boer, the 2002 winner, was defeated in the semi-finals by Francis Hoenselaar. Hoenselaar was in turn beaten by, the BDO World Champion, Trina Gulliver, 3–1 in sets in the final.

== Seeds ==
Men

1. (Netherlands) Raymond van Barneveld
2. (England) Mervyn King
3. (England) Ted Hankey
4. (Australia) Tony David
5. (England) Tony O'Shea
6. (England) Andy Fordham
7. (England) Martin Adams
8. (England) Brian Derbyshire

== Prize money ==
=== Men ===
Pos	Money (Euros)
Winner	45,000
Runner-up	22,500
Semi-Finals	11,250
Quarter-Finals	6,000
Last 16	3,000
Last 32	2,000

== Men's tournament ==
First round Best of 5 sets
(Netherlands) R van Barneveld	3
(Belgium) Johnn Snijers	0
(New Zealand) Peter Hunt	2
(Scotland) Bob Taylor	3
(England) Darryl Fitton	3
(England) Brian Derbyshire	2
(England) Stephen Bunting	1
(England) Gary Robson	3
(England) Colin Monk	3
(England) Tony Eccles	0
(England) Tony O'Shea	1
(Australia) Steve Duke	3
(England) John Walton	3
(Netherlands) Co Stompé	1
(Norway) Robert Wagner	0
(Australia) Tony David	3
(Finland) Jarkko Komula	3
(England) Ted Hankey	0
(Denmark) Brian Buur	1
(England) James Wade	3
(Scotland) Gary Anderson	3
(England) Andy Fordham	0
(Netherlands) Rick Hofstra	1
(England) Tony West	3
(England) Martin Adams	3
(Germany) Tomas Seyler	2
(Netherlands) Albertino Essers	2
(England) Dave Routledge	3
(Netherlands) Vincent van der Voort	3
(England) Steve Coote	1
(England) Shaun Greatbatch	2
(England) Mervyn King	3

Second round Best of 5 sets
(Netherlands) R van Barneveld	3
(Scotland) Bob Taylor	0
(England) Darryl Fitton	2
(England) Gary Robson	3
(England) Colin Monk	3
(Australia) Steve Duke	1
(England) John Walton	1
(Australia) Tony David	3
(Finland) Jarkko Komula	3
(England) James Wade	1
(Scotland) Gary Anderson	1
(England) Tony West	3
(England) Martin Adams	3
(England) Dave Routledge	1
(Netherlands) Vincent van der Voort	0
(England) Mervyn King	3

Quarter-Finals; Best of 9 sets
(Netherlands) R van Barneveld	5
(England) Gary Robson	0
(England) Colin Monk	2
(Australia) Tony David	5
(Finland) Jarkko Komula	5
(England) Tony West	4
(England) Martin Adams	4
(England) Mervyn King	5

Semi-Finals; Best of 9 sets
(Netherlands) R van Barneveld	5
(Australia) Tony David	2
(Finland) Jarkko Komula	2
(England) Mervyn King	5

Final; Best of 11 sets
(Netherlands) R van Barneveld	6
(England) Mervyn King	2

== Women's tournament ==
Quarter-Finals; Best of 3 sets		Semi-Finals; Best of 3 sets		Final; Best of 5 sets
(Belgium) Sandra Pollet	1
(Scotland) Anne Kirk	2	(Scotland) Anne Kirk	0
(England) Trina Gulliver	2	(England) Trina Gulliver	2
(England) Crissy Manley	0			(England) Trina Gulliver	3
(Sweden) Carina Ekberg	0			(Netherlands) Francis Hoenselaar	1
(Netherlands) Mieke de Boer	2	(Netherlands) Mieke de Boer	0
(Netherlands) Francis Hoenselaar	2	(Netherlands) Francis Hoenselaar	2
(Netherlands) Karin Krappen	0
