= 2006 Denmark Open darts =

Denmark Open

Tournament information
- Dates: 2006
- Country: Denmark
- Organisation(s): BDO, WDF, DDU

Champion(s)
- (Netherlands) Vincent van der Voort

2006 Denmark Open is a darts tournament, which took place in Denmark in 2006.

== Results ==
=== Last 32 ===
Round	Player
Winner	(Netherlands) Vincent van der Voort
Final	(Denmark) Per Laursen
Semi-finals	(Denmark) Peter Sønderby
Semi-finals	(Denmark) Per Andersen
Quarter-finals	(Netherlands) Michael van Gerwen
Quarter-finals	(Netherlands) Jelle Klaasen
Quarter-finals	(Finland) Jarkko Komula
Quarter-finals	(Denmark) Kim Frithjof
Last 16	(Sweden) Dennis Nilsson
Last 16	(Netherlands) Roy van Bilderbeek
Last 16	(Finland) Vesa Nuutinen
Last 16	(England) John Walton
Last 16	(Netherlands) Edwin Max
Last 16	(Netherlands) Ron Meulenkamp
Last 16	(Netherlands) Maarten Pape
Last 16	(England) Tony Martin
Last 32	(England) Shaun Greatbatch
Last 32	(Netherlands) Albertino Essers
Last 32	(Denmark) Brian Buur
Last 32	(Netherlands) Jeffrey Stigter
Last 32	(Denmark) Henrik Primdal
Last 32	(England) Tony West
Last 32	(England) Darryl Fitton
Last 32	(Denmark) Vladimir Andersen
Last 32	(Denmark) Anders Zaar
Last 32	(Sweden) Bo Larsson
Last 32	(Netherlands) Mario Robbe
Last 32	(Netherlands) Andre Brantjes
Last 32	(Sweden) Kenneth Hogwall
Last 32	(Netherlands) Rudi van Helsdingen
Last 32	(Sweden) Tobias Kohler
Last 32	(England) Chris McTernan
