= 2002 Denmark Open darts =

Denmark Open

Tournament information
- Dates: 2002
- Country: Denmark
- Organisation(s): BDO, WDF, DDU

Champion(s)
- (Netherlands) Vincent van der Voort

2002 Denmark Open is a darts tournament, which took place in Denmark in 2002.

== Results ==
Round	Player
Winner	(Netherlands) Vincent van der Voort
Final	(England) Gary Robson
Semi-finals	(England) James Wade
Semi-finals	(Scotland) Gary Anderson
Quarter-finals	(Sweden) Ronny Rohr
Quarter-finals	(Netherlands) Albertino Essers
Quarter-finals	(Netherlands) Raymond van Barneveld
Quarter-finals	(Denmark) Søren Behrendsen
Last 16	(Gibraltar) Dyson Parody
Last 16	(England) Simon Whatley
Last 16	(England) Colin Lloyd
Last 16	(England) Wayne Mardle
Last 16	(England) Wes Newton
Last 16	(England) Al Hedman
Last 16	(Australia) Tony David
Last 16	(England) Mervyn King
