= 2000 BDO World Darts Championship =

Tournament information
- Dates: 8–16 January 2000
- Venue: Lakeside Country Club
- Location: Frimley Green, Surrey
- Country: England, United Kingdom
- Organisation(s): BDO
- Format: Sets; Final – best of 11
- Prize fund: £182,000
- Winner's share: £44,000
- High checkout: 170 (England) Ted Hankey

Champion(s)
- (England) Ted Hankey

The 2000 BDO World Darts Championship (known for sponsorship reasons as the 2000 Embassy World Professional Darts Championship) was held at the Lakeside Country Club, Frimley Green, Surrey, England, between 8–16 January 2000.

Ted Hankey was in imperious form throughout the tournament, reaching the quarter-finals without dropping a set and battling back from 4-2 down in the semi-finals against Chris Mason - who had earlier thwarted Raymond van Barneveld's ambitions of three consecutive BDO World titles - to win 5-4. He then took just 46 minutes to beat Ronnie Baxter 6-0 in the final - finishing off with a maximum 170 checkout.

Hankey also hit a record 48 180s in the tournament, including 22 against Mason.

== Seeds ==
1. (Netherlands) Raymond van Barneveld
2. (England) Ronnie Baxter
3. (England) Mervyn King
4. (England) Robbie Widdows
5. (England) Ted Hankey
6. (England) Martin Adams
7. (Scotland) Les Wallace
8. (Scotland) Peter Johnstone

== Prize money ==
The prize money was £175,000.

Champion: £44,000
Runner-Up: £22,000
Semi-Finalists (2): £9,700
Quarter-Finalists (4): £4,900
Last 16 (8): £3,750
Last 32 (16): £2,500

There was also a 9 Dart Checkout prize of £52,000, along with a High Checkout prize of £2,000.

== The Results ==
First Round (best of 5 sets)
1	(Netherlands) Raymond van Barneveld (96.18)	1
(England) Chris Mason (100.02)	3
(England) Matt Clark (86.85)	3
(England) Wayne Mardle (89.22)	1
8	(Scotland) Peter Johnstone (82.23)	0
(England) Andy Fordham (95.25)	3
(England) Steve Beaton (96.03)	3
(Australia) Graham Hunt (91.44)	0
5	(England) Ted Hankey (83.25)	3
(Scotland) Bob Taylor (81.81)	0
(England) Steve Douglas (89.10)	3
(England) Gary Spedding (80.16)	0
4	(England) Robbie Widdows (82.02)	3
(England) Andy Hayfield (81.24)	1
(England) Kevin Painter (84.87)	3
(England) Paul Williams (85.47)	1
2	(England) Ronnie Baxter (90.69)	3
(United States) Scott Wollaston (80.58)	0
(England) Bobby George (84.54)	3
(England) Denis Ovens (85.86)	1
7	(Scotland) Les Wallace (87.81)	0
(Wales) Ritchie Davies (95.28)	3
(England) Colin Monk (84.30)	3
(England) Andy Jenkins (88.55)	2
6	(England) Martin Adams (90.75)	2
(England) Steve Coote (90.96)	3
(Netherlands) Co Stompé (91.20)	3
(England) Andy Smith (80.91)	2
3	(England) Mervyn King (90.21)	3
(England) Les Fitton (90.96)	2
(Australia) Steve Duke (84.99)	3
(Wales) Sean Palfrey (81.03)	2

Second Round (best of 5 sets)
(England) Chris Mason (86.55)	3
(England) Matt Clark (83.94)	2
(England) Andy Fordham (97.56)	3
(England) Steve Beaton (90.84)	0
5	(England) Ted Hankey (90.63)	3
(England) Steve Douglas (78.21)	0
4	(England) Robbie Widdows (95.79)	1
(England) Kevin Painter (91.17)	3
2	(England) Ronnie Baxter (90.84)	3
(England) Bobby George (89.01)	2
(Wales) Ritchie Davies (90.96)	0
(England) Colin Monk (97.11)	3
(England) Steve Coote (89.01)	1
(Netherlands) Co Stompé (92.31)	3
3	(England) Mervyn King (86.46)	3
(Australia) Steve Duke (77.07)	0

Quarter-Finals (best of 9 sets)
(England) Chris Mason (95.64)	5
(England) Andy Fordham (91.17)	3
5	(England) Ted Hankey (93.06)	5
(England) Kevin Painter (89.88)	2
2	(England) Ronnie Baxter (91.17)	5
(England) Colin Monk (90.54)	4
(Netherlands) Co Stompé (96.63)	5
3	(England) Mervyn King (89.31)	2

Semi-Finals (best of 9 sets)
(England) Chris Mason (95.13)	4
5	(England) Ted Hankey (98.55)	5
2	(England) Ronnie Baxter (92.88)	5
(Netherlands) Co Stompé (94.47)	2

Final (best of 11 sets)
5	(England) Ted Hankey (92.40)	6
2	(England) Ronnie Baxter (88.34)	0
