= Steve Coote =

English darts player

Personal information
- Full name: Stephen Coote
- Nickname: "Magic"
- Born: 19 September 1970 (age 56) Bolton, England
- Home town: Bolton, England

Sport
- Sport: Darts
- Playing since: 1980s
- Darts: 20g Harrows Eric Bristow
- Laterality: Right-handed
- Walk-on music: "A Kind of Magic" by Queen

Organisation (see split in darts)
- BDO: 1999–2004, 2007–2013
- PDC: 2004–2007, 2013–2014

WDF major events – best performances
- World Championship: Last 16: 2000, 2002
- World Masters: Semi Finals: 2002
- World Trophy: Quarter Finals: 2002
- Finder Masters: Last 16 Group: 2000, 2002

PDC premier events – best performances
- UK Open: Last 64: 2005, 2006
- Desert Classic: Quarter Finals: 2004

Other tournament wins
- Tournament: Years
- German Open Lytham St Annes Open: 1999; 2004

Stephen Coote (born 19 September 1970) is an English former professional darts player. He won the German Open in 1999. He is not a full-time professional and works as a fireman.

== Career ==
=== BDO ===
Coote made his televised debut at the 1999 Winmau World Masters, beating Matt Chapman in the first round, before losing in the second round to Dave King. He then played at the 2000 BDO World Darts Championship, beating Martin Adams in the first round, but lost to Co Stompé. In the 2001 BDO World Darts Championship he lost in the first round to Wayne Mardle. In the 2002 World Championship, he beat Sweden's Markus Korhonen in round one, but lost to Martin Adams in the second round. He reached the 2002 Dutch Open final, but lost to Shaun Greatbatch, who hit the first nine-darter on live television. He followed that with a semi-final place at the 2002 World Masters, with wins over Darryl Fitton, Alan Reynolds, Ted Hankey and Mike Veitch. His run ended though with a defeat to Tony West. In 2003, he was beaten in the first round at Lakeside by Mervyn King. The 2004 World Championship saw him play in a thriller with Gary Robson. Coote was 2–0 up in sets, but Robson fought back to level it at 2–2 and eventually took the match in a sudden death leg.

=== Switch to the PDC ===
Shortly afterwards, Coote switched to the rival Professional Darts Corporation. His first tournament in the PDC was the Las Vegas Desert Classic Qualifiers and he qualified for the event. He reached the quarter-finals, losing to the eventual winner Phil Taylor. Despite his PDC career getting off to a great start, he never made much progress afterwards, with only a quarter-final place in the Bob Anderson Classic in 2005 to show for. He played at the 2006 UK Open, reaching the last 64 stage. He then reached the last 32 of the Bobby Bourn Memorial, receiving £150 for his efforts. It would be his final winnings in the PDC Pro Tour as he suffered early exit in qualifiers for the World Grand Prix and World Championship as well as the UK Open Regionals, earning no money as a result. During 2013 Coote has won a tour card while playing in the PDC Qualifying School, so he can now play on the PDC Circuit.

=== Return to the BDO ===
In September 2007, Coote became one of only a few players to return to the BDO after switching to the PDC. He suffered early exits from the World Masters and the Lakeside World Championship qualifiers. He then reached the last 16 of the Scottish Open in February 2008, losing to Garry Thompson who won the event.

== World Championship results ==
=== BDO ===
- 2000: 2nd Round (lost to Co Stompé 1–3) (sets)
- 2001: 1st Round (lost to Wayne Mardle 2–3)
- 2002: 2nd Round (lost to Martin Adams 1–3)
- 2003: 1st Round (lost to Mervyn King 1–3)
- 2004: 1st Round (lost to Gary Robson 2–3)
