= 2001 BDO World Darts Championship =

Darts tournament 2001 in Surrey

Tournament information
- Dates: 6–14 January 2001
- Venue: Lakeside Country Club
- Location: Frimley Green, Surrey
- Country: England, United Kingdom
- Organisation(s): British Darts Organisation
- Format: Sets; Finals: best of 11 (men's) best of 3 (women's)
- Prize fund: £189,000 (men's) £8,300 (women's)
- Winner's share: £46,000 (men's) £4,000 (women's)
- High checkout: 167 Steve Coote (ENG)

Champion(s)
- John Walton (ENG) (men's); Trina Gulliver (ENG) (women's)

The 2001 BDO World Darts Championship (known for sponsorship reasons as the 2001 Embassy World Professional Darts Championship) was a professional darts tournament held from 6 to 14 January 2001 at the Lakeside Country Club in Frimley Green, Surrey. It was the 24th staging of the competition since the 1978 event and the 16th time it took place at the Lakeside Country Club. The tournament was the first of 44 British Darts Organisation (BDO) tournaments in 2001. The host broadcaster was the BBC and the competition was sponsored by the cigarette brand Embassy.

The 2000 Winmau World Masters winner John Walton defeated the reigning world champion Ted Hankey 6–2 in the final, becoming the 15th BDO world champion. He joined Eric Bristow and Raymond van Barneveld as the third player to follow their success in the Winmau World Masters with the world championship. Walton defeated Ritchie Davies, Mervyn King, Marko Pusa and Wayne Mardle en route to the final. Steve Coote achieved a 167 checkout, the highest of the competition, in his first round match against Mardle. A women's world championship was held for the first time. It was won by Trina Gulliver, whitewashing Crissy Howat 2–0 in the semi-final and defeating Mandy Solomons 2–1 in the final.

== Background ==
=== Men's competition ===
The British Darts Organisation (BDO) was formed in 1973 by the managing director Olly Croft; the BDO World Darts Championship was first held in 1978. The 2001 tournament was held between 6 and 14 January in Frimley Green, Surrey and was the first of 44 BDO-sanctioned events that year. It was the 24th edition of the tournament and featured a 32-player main draw that was played at the Lakeside Country Club.

27 players automatically qualified for the main draw with the top 8 seeded according to their final position in the BDO rankings. Mervyn King was seeded first overall and the tournament's reigning champion Ted Hankey was seeded seventh. The remaining five places were decided via a play-off round at the Lakeside Country Club on 30 November 2000. Steve Alker, Shaun Greatbatch, Jez Porter, Davy Richardson and Gary Robson were the five players who progressed from the qualifying rounds to the main draw. The maximum number of sets played in a match increased from five in the first and second rounds to nine in the quarter and semi-finals, leading up to the final which was played as best-of-11 frames. Sponsored by the cigarette brand Embassy, it had a total prize fund of £189,000 and the host broadcaster was the BBC.

Bookmakers considered the two-time champion Raymond van Barneveld the favourite to win the tournament. Hankey said he was optimistic he could win the tournament for a second time, "I've kept my practising up and played in enough tournaments. I haven't let exhibitions take over."

=== Women's tournament ===
In November 2000, the BDO announced the creation of an independent women's world championship tournament; it was established to celebrate the BDO's 30th anniversary of staging and promoting darts competitions. The tournament was staged between 6 and 11 January 2001, and allowed women players to avoid having to compete with men in the International Play-offs, which they had done since 1995. It featured the world's top three ranked players with one unseeded player and a total prize fund of £8,300. Trina Gulliver was seeded first overall, Francis Hoenselaar was the second seed and Crissy Howat was the final seeded player. The only non-seeded participant was Mandy Solomon. All matches were played to the best-of-three sets.

== Men's tournament ==
=== Round 1 ===
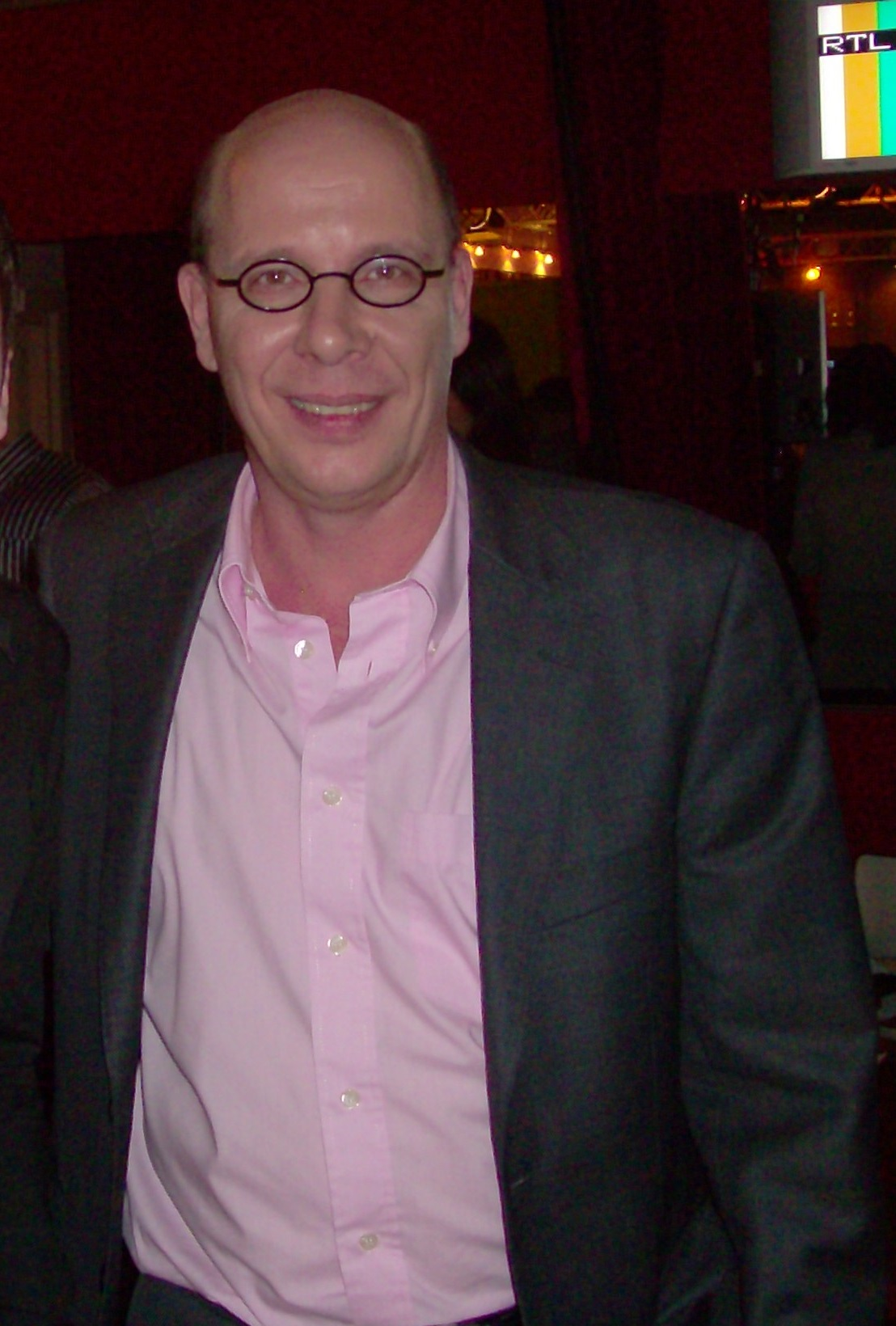
Co Stompé (pictured in 2011), one of sixteen players to reach the second round

The first round of the competition, in which 32 players participated, took place from 6 to 8 January and was held to the best-of-five sets. In this round, King came from 2–0 behind Chris Mason to win three sets in a row and a 3–2 victory; Mason missed two consecutive game-winning opportunities on the double 18 ring in the fifth set. Afterwards, he said "Lady Luck shone on me today." John Walton took the opening two sets against Ritchie Davies before his opponent won the third set. After Davies lost two legs in the fourth set, he won the third leg to return to contention; Walton won the match 3–1 in the fourth leg. Porter defeated fellow Englishman Richardson 3–2 in a closely contested match. Number five seed Co Stompé beat Andy Smith 3–1 to prevent a requite from Smith. On his debut appearance at the BDO World Darts Championship, Marko Pusa overcame the eighth seed Colin Monk 3–2. Pusa took the first two sets before Monk won the next two. Monk claimed the first two legs of the fifth set; Pusa forced a tie-break by taking the third and fourth legs. Pusa compiled two scores of 41 and one maximum score (180) to win the match on the double ten ring with his final dart throw.

Wayne Mardle, the winner of the 2000 Dutch Open, defeated Steve Coote, who achieved a checkout of 167, 3–2. In the first match of the second day, Martin Adams. the England captain, achieved three maximum scores to lead Erik Clarys 1–0. Clarys responded with the same scores in the second set. Adams then won the following two sets to claim a 3–1 victory. Two-time finalist Ronnie Baxter defeated world number 26 Mitchell Crooks 3–1. during which the two competitors averaged over 30 points per dart. Steve Beaton registered the tournament's first whitewash with a 3–0 victory over Bob Aldous. Van Barneveld won three successive legs in the first set of his match against Robson; he attempted a nine-dart finish in the second leg. Robson produced a 100 checkout to take the second set. A maximum score in the fifth leg of the third set gave Van Barneveld the lead, who took the match 3–1 in the fourth set.

Peter Hinkley took a 3–1 win over Nick Gedney. The match between Hankey and debutant Greatbatch was interrupted by the first streaker in darts history. It caused a twenty-minute stoppage to allow security to remove her from the Lakeside Country Club. Hankey achieved six maximum scores and averaged 31.34 per dart thrown to whitewash Greatbatch 3–0. Both Hankey and Greatbatch spoke of their annoyance over the interruption after the match. Of the other four first round matches, all of them ended in 3–0 whitewashes. Sixth seed Kevin Painter produced three maximum checkouts to defeat Andy Jenkins, 1996 quarter-finalist Matt Clark beat qualifier Alker, and world number 22 Tony David lost to the third seed Andy Fordham, who had back pain. The final match saw Bob Taylor lose to Wayne Jones.

=== Round 2 ===
The second round was held from 9 to 10 January. Mardle became the first player through to the quarter-finals when he took 24 minutes to whitewash Stompé 3–0. Walton took an early lead over King and averaged 32.95 per dart thrown. A checkout of 121 from King prevented Walton from winning four legs in a row; Walton won the second set 3–1. He took the first leg of the third set with a 148 checkout. Walton then completed a 3–0 whitewash of King with a checkout of 121. Pusa achieved an average of 33.77 points per dart thrown to defeat Porter 3–1. Baxter was the highest seeded player to enter the competition's next stage with a 3–1 victory over Adams.

The fifth match of the second round saw Van Barneveld win 3–2 over Beaton. It began with Beaton winning the first set and Van Barneveld responded to claim the second and third sets and lost one leg in the process. Beaton won three consecutive legs in the fourth set to level the score at 2–2, which Van Barneveld responded to claim a 3–2 victory over the former in the match's final set. Hankey achieved five maximum scores and whitewashed Hinkley 3–0. The result set-up a match with Van Barneveld in the quarter-finals. Painter achieved a 164 checkout and multiple maximums in defeating Clark 3–1 with a match-finishing dart on the bullseye ring. In the final match of the second round Fordham and Jones equalled each other's performance in the first set until Fordham took the set. Fordham compiled two maximum scores and won two sets in a row to whitewash a faltering Jones 3–0.

=== Quarter-finals ===
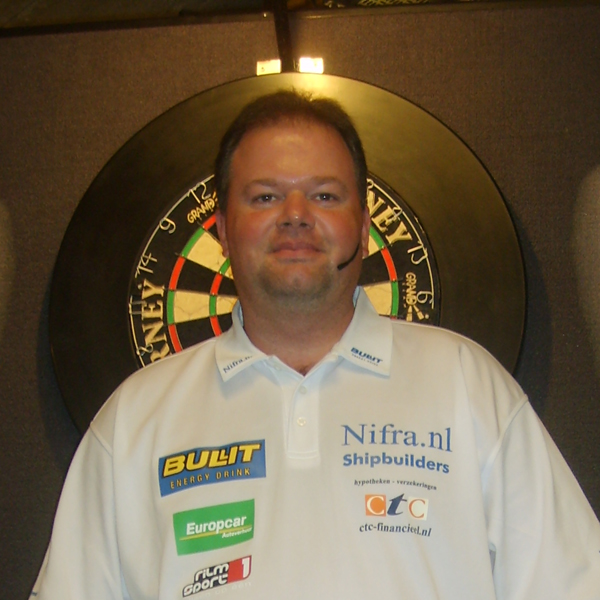
Raymond van Barneveld (pictured in 2006) dropped out of the quarter-final stage.

The four quarter-finals were played to the best-of-nine sets between 11 and 12 January. Walton won the first set of his match against Pusa and then missed the chance to attain a nine-dart finish on his penultimate throw in the second. He then took three consecutive sets and completed a 138 checkout before Pusa produced two maximum scores as he won two legs in a row. Pusa could not convert this form and Walton completed a 5–0 whitewash. Later that night, Mardle took an early lead of 3–1 over Baxter, who came back to level the score at 3–3. Baxter could not maintain this form and Mardle won two sets in a row with a 124 checkout completed on the bullseye to win 5–3. This ensured that one of the two players in the final would not be seeded.

Hankey overcame Van Barneveld 5–4 in a closely fought 1 hour, 40-minute match. The first two sets were won by Hankey by maintaining his composure and Van Barneveld levelled the score at 2–2. A fifth set whitewash returned Hankey to the lead; Van Barneveld twice levelled the score to 3–3 and then 4–4 to force a final set decider. Hankey took a 5–4 victory and progressed into the semi-finals with a 25 checkout after Van Barneveld was unable to convert a double. Against Painter, Fordham opened up a lead of 3–0. Painter reduced Fordham's advantage to one set ahead in the next two sets; he could not go any farther as Fordham took two consecutive sets to win 5–2 and was the final player to enter the semi-finals.

=== Semi-finals ===
Both of the semi-finals were played on 13 January. Walton overcame Mardle to win 5–3 and enter the final. He compiled finishes of 11 and 12 darts to claim the first set and Mardle took the second to level the score at 1–1. This prompted Walton to respond with victories in the following two sets to lead 3–1 at the mid-session interval. A second finish of 11 darts provided Walton with another set. Mardle then won the sixth and seventh sets to lower Walton's advantage to 4–3. Walton produced a 121 checkout and finished the match in the eighth set by throwing a dart on the double nine ring. Afterwards, Walton admitted to have calmed in the final set, "I had to get off to a good start, having the arrows in the first set, and just told myself to keep winning my legs, and I managed to nick a few of his as well."

The other semi-final game saw Hankey enter the final of the tournament for the second year in a row with a 5–2 victory over Fordham. Hankey registered one maximum score en route to taking two consecutive sets and lead 3–1 before the mid-session interval. After the interval, Fordham drew to within one set with a finish of 11 darts. Hankey responded to win the match with victories in six of the next seven legs. Hankey reiterated afterwards that he sought to mirror Van Barneveld and Eric Bristow and win the tournament for the second time, "It will mean everything to me to win again because I don't just want one or two Embassy titles, I want four or five." Fordham said Hankey pressured him from the commencement of the match, "Ted played very well and although i didn't play badly it's very hard to stay in it when he's averaging over 33 for a dart."

=== Final ===
The final played between Hankey and Walton on 14 January was held to the best-of-11 sets. The match began with Hankey achieving a score of 22 with the first three throws of his darts pack. Walton achieved a maximum score on his first try of the match, and he went on to secure the first two sets 3–2; the first of which he won with a Shanghai. The third set was won by Hankey by the same scoreline as both players produced two maximum scores. Walton won the fourth set by achieving two further maximum scores, a 100 checkout and a 12-dart finish. Hankey secured the fifth set to enter the five-minute mid-session interval 3–2 behind. After the interval, Walton won the sixth set. He followed up with victory in the seventh set by throwing 31 darts, and it coincided with Hankey's form declining. Walton and Hankey exchanged the first two legs of the eighth set before Walton achieved a 76 checkout in the third leg. Hankey missed a shot to secure a 121 checkout and Walton finished the match with a 25 checkout to win the tournament.

Walton's victory made him the 15th player to win the competition; he had won the Winmau World Masters in December 2000. He became the first player since Bristow and Burnett to follow his success in the World Masters with the World Championship. Walton was awarded the championship trophy by Kate Hoey, the Minister for Sport, and earned £46,000 for winning the tournament. He said of his triumph, "This means the world to me. It's an unbelievable feeling. When I hit the double eight I just wanted to fly. I'm absolutely delighted." Hankey praised his opponent's playing style, "He was buzzing. I hit 180s all the time but I just couldn't get away from him. I knew I had to win the sets in which I threw first but he hits so many 140s and 180s. When you go 4–2 down it's always hard to come back in a best-of-11 match. I missed a couple of doubles but I've no complaints."

== Women's tournament ==
In the first semi-final match, Gulliver produced four maximum scores and an average score of 31.63 per dart to whitewash Howat 2–0. Howat did not win any legs; she achieved an average score of 27.28. Solomons defeated Hoensellar 2–1 in the second semi-final match. Hoensellar responded to Solomons winning the first leg by taking the second. Somlons took the third and fourth legs to win the first set. Hoensellar produced a maximum score, maintaining her form to claim set two and force a final set decider. Solomons achieved a 66 checkout to provide her with an early advantage before the final set was tied at 2–2. Hosensellar missed the double 16 ring; a 96 checkout from Solomons secured her a berth in the final.

Solomons took the first set of the final with a score of 3–1. In the second set, Gulliver produced the game's first maximum score as Solomons won the set. The final set saw Gulliver hit the triple 14 and double 16 rings to move into a position of advantage. She compiled scores of 94, 100 and a maximum to lower the points she needed for victory to 127. Gulliver required six darts to claim the title and she converted four of them to win the match and the tournament. This made Gulliver the inaugural BDO Women's World Darts champion.

== Prize fund ==
The breakdown of prize money for 2001 is shown below.

Men's tournament

- Winner: £46,000
- Runner-up: £23,000
- Semi-finalists (×2): £10,000
- Quarter-finalists (×4): £5,000
- Last 16 (×8): £3,900
- Last 32 (×16): £2,650
- 9 Dart Checkout: £52,000
- Highest checkout: £2,000
- Non-qualifiers: £5,200
- Total: £189,000

Women's tournament

- Winner: £4,000
- Runner-up: £2,000
- Semi-finalists (×2): £1,000
- Non-qualifiers: £300
- Total: £8,300

== Draw ==
=== Men's draw ===
Numbers given to the left of players' names show the seedings for the top eight players in the men's tournament. The five qualifiers are indicated by a (q). The figures in brackets to the right of a competitor's name state their three-dart finishing averages in a match. Players in bold denote match winners.

**First Round** (best of 5 sets)
1	**Mervyn King (ENG)** (93.21)	**3**
Chris Mason (ENG) (92.76)	2
**John Walton (ENG)** (100.62)	**3**
Ritchie Davies (WAL) (93.54)	1
8	Colin Monk (ENG) (91.02)	2
**Marko Pusa (FIN)** (89.34)	**3**
Q	**Jez Porter (ENG)** (88.71)	**3**
Q	Davy Richardson (ENG) (88.20)	2
5	**Co Stompé (NED)** (94.20)	**3**
Andy Smith (ENG) (83.55)	1
**Wayne Mardle (ENG)** (94.32)	**3**
Steve Coote (ENG) (86.13)	2
4	**Ronnie Baxter (ENG)** (98.31)	**3**
Mitchell Crooks (NIR) (91.26)	1
**Martin Adams (ENG)** (87.12)	**3**
Erik Clarys (BEL) (79.20)	1
2	**Raymond van Barneveld (NED)** (92.94)	**3**
Q	Gary Robson (ENG) (88.92)	1
**Steve Beaton (ENG)** (87.18)	**3**
Bob Aldous (ENG) (87.00)	0
7	**Ted Hankey (ENG)** (94.02)	**3**
Q	Shaun Greatbatch (ENG) (88.56)	0
**Peter Hinkley (AUS)** (86.85)	**3**
Nick Gedney (ENG) (88.89)	1
6	**Kevin Painter (ENG)** (94.71)	**3**
Andy Jenkins (ENG) (84.90)	0
**Matt Clark (ENG)** (95.88)	**3**
Q	Steve Alker (WAL) (87.54)	0
3	**Andy Fordham (ENG)** (91.95)	**3**
Tony David (AUS) (90.87)	0
**Wayne Jones (ENG)** (92.61)	**3**
Bob Taylor (SCO) (83.13)	0

**Second Round** (best of 5 sets)
1	(England) Mervyn King (97.02)	0
(England) **John Walton** (98.85)	**3**
(Finland) **Marko Pusa** (101.40)	**3**
Q	(England) Jez Porter (96.33)	1
5	(Netherlands) Co Stompé (87.78)	0
(England) **Wayne Mardle** (94.05)	**3**
4	(England) **Ronnie Baxter** (90.24)	**3**
(England) Martin Adams (91.83)	1
2	(Netherlands) **Raymond van Barneveld** (91.53)	**3**
(England) Steve Beaton (92.58)	2
7	(England) **Ted Hankey** (97.44)	**3**
(Australia) Peter Hinkley (92.28)	0
6	(England) **Kevin Painter** (96.06)	**3**
(England) Matt Clark (93.06)	1
3	(England) **Andy Fordham** (90.75)	**3**
(England) Wayne Jones (88.35)	0

**Quarter-Finals** (best of 9 sets)
(England) **John Walton** (93.90)	**5**
(Finland) Marko Pusa (83.82)	0
(England) **Wayne Mardle** (90.24)	**5**
4	(England) Ronnie Baxter (93.66)	3
2	(Netherlands) Raymond van Barneveld (94.50)	4
7	(England) **Ted Hankey** (95.40)	**5**
6	(England) Kevin Painter (93.24)	2
3	(England) **Andy Fordham** (92.79)	**5**

**Semi-finals** (best of 9 sets)
(England) **John Walton** (97.95)	**5**
(England) Wayne Mardle (93.27)	3
7	(England) **Ted Hankey** (99.30)	**5**
3	(England) Andy Fordham (90.75)	2

**Final** (best of 11 sets)
(England) **John Walton** (95.55)	**6**
7	(England) Ted Hankey (94.86)	2

=== Women's draw ===
Numbers given to the left of players' names show the seedings for the top three players in the women's competition. The figures in brackets to the right of a competitor's name state their three-dart finishing averages in a match. Players in bold denote match winners.

Semi-finals
1	**Trina Gulliver (ENG)** (94.92)	**2**
3	Crissy Howat (ENG) (81.84)	0
2	Francis Hoenselaar (NED) (68.49)	1
**Mandy Solomons (ENG)** (71.67)	**2**

Final
1	(England) **Trina Gulliver** (83.97)	**2**
(England) Mandy Solomons (79.11)	1
