= André Brantjes =

Dutch darts player (born 1958)

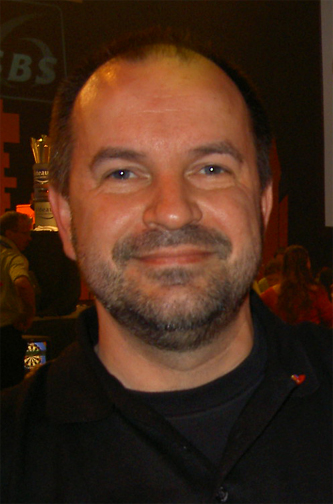
- Brantjes in 2005

Personal information
- Nickname: "The Quiet Man"
- Born: 29 November 1958 (age 67) Rotterdam, Netherlands
- Home town: Helmond, Netherlands

Sport
- Sport: Darts
- Darts: 18g Masterdarts multi-ring
- Laterality: Right-handed
- Walk-on music: "Everybody Wants to Rule the World" by Tears for Fears

Organisation (see split in darts)
- BDO: 2003–2006

WDF major events – best performances
- World Championship: Quarter-Finals 2005
- World Masters: Last 64 2003, 2004, 2005
- World Trophy: Last 32 2004, 2005
- Int. Darts League: Last 16 2004, 2005
- Finder Masters: Last 24 Group Stage 2004

Other tournament wins
- Tournament: Years
- Spring Cup: 2003, 2004

André Brantjes (born 29 November 1958) is a Dutch former darts player who played in British Darts Organisation (BDO) events till 2006.

== Career ==
Brantjes reached the final of the 2003 German Open, losing to Ted Hankey. He then won the unranked Spring Cup, beating Vincent van der Voort in the semi-finals and then defeating Erik Clarys in the final. After reaching the quarter-finals of the 2004 Finnish Open, Brantjes retained the Spring Cup title, beating Mario Robbe and Dick van Dijk before defeating Niels de Ruiter in the final. Brantjes played in the 2004 International Darts League, losing his opening group game to Gary Anderson, he defeated Robbe before beating Martin Adams to qualify for the second group stage. Brantjes then lost his first two group games against Tony David and Hankey, eventually winning his final group game against Jarkko Komula.

He achieved some fame during the 2005 World Championship, which was his debut at the event. He beat compatriot Co Stompé 3–2 in the first round, making a 170 checkout in only his second leg of the match, and then upset the previous year's runner-up and world number one, Mervyn King, again by 3–2. However, he was then soundly defeated by Simon Whitlock in the quarter-finals, 5–1. Brantjes reached the second round of the 2005 International Darts League, winning his opening group games against van der Voort and Davy Richardson to qualify before losing to John Walton who won the group. Brantjes eventually lost in the second round to Adams.

Brantjes has not played in a tournament since the 2006 World Masters where he lost in the very first round to Ireland's James Keogh.

== World Championship results ==
=== BDO ===
- 2005: Quarter-finals (lost to Simon Whitlock 1–5)
