= 2005 BDO World Darts Championship =

Tournament information
- Dates: 1–9 January 2005
- Venue: Lakeside Country Club
- Location: Frimley Green, Surrey
- Country: England, United Kingdom
- Organisation(s): BDO
- Format: Sets; Finals: best of 11 (men's) best of 3 (women's)
- Prize fund: £201,000
- Winner's share: £50,000
- High checkout: 170 (Netherlands) Raymond van Barneveld (Netherlands) André Brantjes

Champion(s)
- (Netherlands) Raymond van Barneveld

The 2005 BDO World Darts Championship (known for sponsorship reasons as the 2005 Lakeside World Professional Darts Championship) was held from 1–9 January 2005 at the Lakeside Country Club in Frimley Green, Surrey. Raymond van Barneveld lifted the title for a fourth time, defeating England captain Martin Adams 6–2 in the final. The defending champion Andy Fordham suffered a first round loss to Vincent van der Voort. The women's event saw Trina Gulliver win her fifth successive title defeating Francis Hoenselaar 2–0 in a repeat the last year's final.

== Seeds ==
Men

1. (Netherlands) Raymond van Barneveld
2. (England) Ted Hankey
3. (England) Mervyn King
4. (England) Tony West
5. (England) Darryl Fitton
6. (England) Tony O'Shea
7. (England) Martin Adams
8. (Netherlands) Vincent van der Voort

== Prize money ==
The prize money was £199,000 for the men's event and £10,000 for the women's event.

Men's Champion: £50,000
Runner-Up: £25,000
Semi-Finalists (2): £11,000
Quarter-Finalists (4): £6,000
Last 16 (8): £4,250
Last 32 (16): £2,750

There was also a shared 9 Dart Checkout prize of £52,000, along with a High Checkout prize of £2,000 per event.

== The results ==
=== Men ===
First Round (best of 5 sets)
1	(Netherlands) Raymond van Barneveld (95.49)	3
(Scotland) Gary Anderson (88.11)	0
(Scotland) Mike Veitch (83.79)	3
(England) Shaun Greatbatch (81.78)	2
8	(Netherlands) Vincent van der Voort (84.72)	3
(England) Andy Fordham (85.53)	2
(England) Tony Eccles (87.72)	3
(Australia) Tony David (88.41)	2
5	(England) Darryl Fitton (88.71)	3
(England) Gary Robson (86.10)	1
(England) John Walton (91.23)	3
(England) Dave Routledge (84.15)	1
4	(England) Tony West (81.90)	3
(Netherlands) Rick Hofstra (81.24)	2
(Scotland) Robert Thornton (88.74)	3
(England) Martin Atkins (85.74)	0
2	(England) Ted Hankey (95.01)	3
(United States) John Kuczynski (84.24)	1
(Norway) Robert Wagner (87.78)	3
(Finland) Jarkko Komula (86.64)	2
7	(England) Martin Adams (94.65)	3
(England) Davy Richardson (92.58)	2
(Scotland) John Henderson (75.09)	3
(England) Stephen Bunting (72.51)	0
6	(England) Tony O'Shea (83.76)	1
(Finland) Marko Kantele (85.26)	3
(Australia) Simon Whitlock (87.30)	3
(England) Tony Martin (78.96)	1
3	(England) Mervyn King (89.31)	3
(Wales) Wayne Warren (89.49)	0
(Netherlands) André Brantjes (85.62)	3
(Netherlands) Co Stompé (91.50)	2

Second Round (best of 5 sets)
1	(Netherlands) Raymond van Barneveld (100.92)	3
(Scotland) Mike Veitch (94.47)	0
8	(Netherlands) Vincent van der Voort (91.11)	3
(England) Tony Eccles (91.26)	1
5	(England) Darryl Fitton (90.81)	3
(England) John Walton (87.09)	0
4	(England) Tony West (85.20)	0
(Scotland) Robert Thornton (88.53)	3
2	(England) Ted Hankey (95.31)	3
(Norway) Robert Wagner (94.62)	2
7	(England) Martin Adams (86.67)	3
(Scotland) John Henderson (86.58)	2
(Finland) Marko Kantele (82.29)	1
(Australia) Simon Whitlock (83.97)	3
3	(England) Mervyn King (89.52)	2
(Netherlands) André Brantjes (89.49)	3

Quarter-Finals (best of 9 sets)
1	(Netherlands) Raymond van Barneveld (98.88)	5
8	(Netherlands) Vincent van der Voort (88.50)	0
5	(England) Darryl Fitton (95.49)	5
(Scotland) Robert Thornton (87.69)	0
2	(England) Ted Hankey (95.85)	3
7	(England) Martin Adams (93.99)	5
(Australia) Simon Whitlock (91.77)	5
(Netherlands) André Brantjes (85.11)	1

Semi-Finals (best of 9 sets)
1	(Netherlands) Raymond van Barneveld (95.37)	5
5	(England) Darryl Fitton (93.90)	3
7	(England) Martin Adams (97.83)	5
(Australia) Simon Whitlock (86.22)	0

Final (best of 11 sets)
1	(Netherlands) Raymond van Barneveld (96.78)	6
7	(England) Martin Adams (91.35)	2

Embassy World Darts Championship

Tournament information
- Dates: 1–9 January 2005
- Venue: Lakeside Country Club
- Location: Frimley Green, Surrey
- Country: England, United Kingdom
- Organisation(s): BDO
- Format: Sets; Finals: best of 3 (women's)
- Prize fund: £10,000
- Winner's share: £4,000

Champion(s)
- (England) Trina Gulliver

== Seeds ==
Women

1. (England) Trina Gulliver
2. (Netherlands) Francis Hoenselaar
3. (England) Crissy Manley
4. (Wales) Jan Robbins

== Prize money ==
The prize money was £10,000 for the women's event.

Women's Champion: £4,000
Runner-Up: £2,000
Semi-Finalists (2): £1,000
Quarter-Finalists (4): £500

== The results ==
=== Women ===
Women's bracket:

Quarter-Finals
1	(England) Trina Gulliver (85.47)	2
(Scotland) Anne Kirk (71.16)	0
3	(England) Crissy Manley (68.22)	2
(Finland) Tarja Salminen (69.09)	1
2	(Netherlands) Francis Hoenselaar (78.21)	2
(Netherlands) Karin Krappen (69.18)	0
4	(Wales) Jan Robbins (74.16)	2
(England) Sue Edwards (61.95)	0

Semi-Finals
1	(England) Trina Gulliver (71.58)	2
3	(England) Crissy Manley (66.48)	0
2	(Netherlands) Francis Hoenselaar (76.32)	2
4	(Wales) Jan Robbins (70.17)	0

Final
1	(England) Trina Gulliver (79.68)	2
2	(Netherlands) Francis Hoenselaar (73.89)	0
