= Mervyn King (darts player) =

English darts player (born 1966)

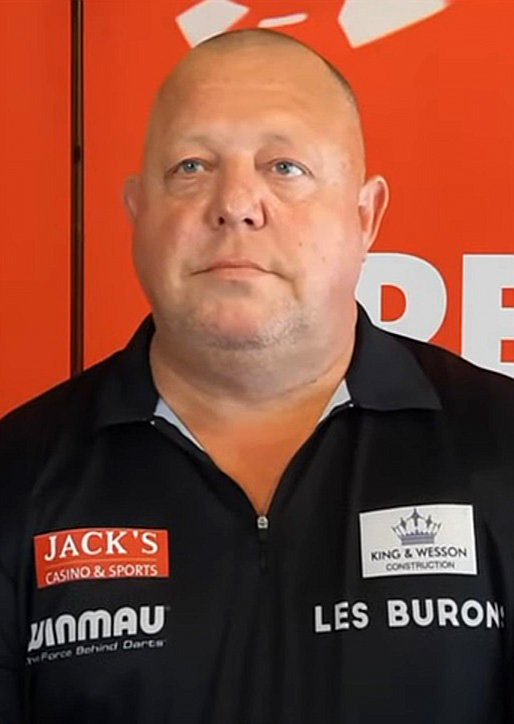
- King in 2022

Personal information
- Nickname: "The King"
- Born: 15 March 1966 (age 60) Ipswich, Suffolk, England
- Home town: Bradwell, Norfolk, England

Sport
- Sport: Darts
- Playing since: 1979
- Darts: 22g Winmau Signature
- Laterality: Right-handed
- Walk-on music: "King of Kings" by Motörhead

Organisation (see split in darts)
- BDO: 1994–2007
- PDC: 2007–present (Tour Card: 2011–2024, 2026–)
- Current world ranking: (PDC) 107 (5 November 2026)

WDF major events – best performances
- World Championship: Runner-up: 2002, 2004
- World Masters: Winner (1): 2004
- World Trophy: Runner-up: 2003, 2005
- Int. Darts League: Winner (1): 2005
- Finder Masters: Winner (1): 2005

PDC premier events – best performances
- World Championship: Semi-final: 2009
- World Matchplay: Semi-final: 2009
- World Grand Prix: Runner-up: 2012
- UK Open: Semi-final: 2014
- Grand Slam: Semi-final: 2008, 2014
- European Championship: Semi-final: 2014
- Premier League: Runner-up: 2009
- Championship League: Runner-up: 2008
- Desert Classic: Quarter-final: 2008, 2009
- US Open/WSoD: Quarter-final: 2007
- PC Finals: Runner-up: 2010, 2020
- Masters: Runner-up: 2014, 2021
- World Series Finals: Quarter-final: 2021

WSDT major events – best performances
- World Championship: Last 28: 2025
- Champions: Quarter-final: 2025

Other tournament wins
- Years
Antwerp Open	1999
BDO British Classic	1998, 1999, 2002
BDO Gold Cup	1995
BDO British Open	2000
Dutch Open	1997
Finnish Open	1997, 2000
French Open	1996
MODUS Super Series Weekly Winner	2025
PDC Challenge Tour	2025
Swiss Open	2005
UK Open Qualifier	2010
WDF Europe Cup Pairs	2002
WDF Europe Cup Team	2000, 2004
WDF World Cup Pairs	2003
WDF World Cup Team	1999, 2001
European Tour
European Darts Grand Prix	2014
Players Championships (x6)
2008 (x2), 2010, 2011 (x2), 2018

Mervyn King (born 15 March 1966) is an English professional darts player who competes in Professional Darts Corporation (PDC) events, where he reached a peak ranking of world number four. Nicknamed "The King", he has reached seven PDC major finals. He formerly competed in British Darts Organisation (BDO) tournaments, where he was the 2004 World Masters winner, and both the Finder Masters and International Darts League champion in 2005. He was ranked BDO world number one on two occasions, in 2000 and 2005.

He was the runner-up at the BDO World Darts Championship in both 2002 and 2004 as well as at the 2000 World Masters. In the PDC, King reached the semi-finals at the 2009 PDC World Championship, and was runner-up at the PDC Masters in both 2014 and 2021, the Players Championship Finals in 2010 and 2020, the 2009 Premier League Darts, the 2012 World Grand Prix, and the 2008 Championship League Darts.

== Early life ==
King first took up the game at the age of 12, playing with an old rolled-cardboard dartboard given to him by his father. His father insisted that he played darts using competition distance and height. By the age of 13, he had ambitions to become a professional player as he was playing county darts at Superleague level. His first county A game was at the age of 14 and he won his local men's singles league at that age.

== BDO career ==
King made his professional debut as a 28-year-old in the 1994 World Masters where he lost in the last 32 to Andy Fordham. His first title in the BDO came in the 1996 French Open where he beat Leo Laurens in the final. King has won several Open titles since he came onto the darts scene in 1995, including the Dutch Open in 1997. He made his debut at BDO World Darts Championship in 1997 as a 30-year-old. He reached the semi-final of the event beating Ronnie Baxter and Roland Scholten before losing to eventual champion Les Wallace. He won £8,700 for his performance.

King reached twelve major finals whilst playing in the BDO and converted only three of them into tournament victories. In 2004, he claimed his first BDO major title when he won the World Masters in Bridlington, defeating Tony O'Shea 7–6 in the final having trailed 3–5. His two other major victories to date have both taken place in the Netherlands. The first of these was the 2005 International Darts League, where he defeated O'Shea again in the final, this time by 13–11 in legs. Later the same year he added the Dutch Grand Masters beating Martin Adams 5–4 in the final.

His first major final came in the 2000 World Masters where he beat such players as Peter Manley and Colin Monk before eventually narrowly falling to John Walton 2 sets to 3. King went into the 2002 BDO World Darts Championship as number 4 in the event seedings and reached the final, losing to Australian Tony David. King beat Raymond van Barneveld in the quarter-finals 5–3 whilst averaging 101.67 before beating Colin Monk in the semi-finals to reach his first World Championship final. As well as winning £24,000 for reaching the final, he also earned a further £2,000 for a 170 finish, the highest checkout in the tournament.

2003 proved to be a good year for King as he reached two major finals and the semi-final of the World Championships. He began the year with the 2003 BDO World Darts Championship and was seeded third for the tournament. He whitewashed Colin Monk 5 sets to 0 in the quarter-finals before losing out to Raymond van Barneveld in the semi-finals, denying him a second consecutive World Championship final appearance He went on to reach the finals of the 2003 International Darts League and World Darts Trophy losing out to Raymond van Barneveld on both occasions.

In 2004, King had another successful year as he reached two semi-finals and two finals, winning one, in the four BDO majors. He began the year ranked third in the seedings for the second consecutive year. In the 2004 BDO World Darts Championship, he narrowly beat Ritchie Davies 5 sets to 4 in the quarter-finals before convincingly beating Tony O'Shea in the semi-finals 5–1. Despite this he lost in the final for the second time in three years losing to Andy Fordham 3 sets to 6. After his good World Championship form he went on to reach the semi-finals of the 2004 International Darts League and World Darts Trophy narrowly losing to Tony David and Martin Adams 8–9 and 4–5 respectively. He ended the year winning his first BDO Major in the World Masters as he beat Tony David in the semi-finals 6–2 before winning the tournament prevailing against Tony O'Shea in a tight encounter which ended 7–6 in favour of King handing him his first major title after his sixth final.

In 2005, he had his worst World Championship performance in four years, as he made only the quarter-finals, losing out to André Brantjes 2 sets to 3. King spoke of his poor form and prior to the 2005 BDO World Darts Championship. King's next tournament that year was the International Darts League. He beat Ted Hankey, Co Stompé and Simon Whitlock before facing Tony O'Shea for the second time in a major final, and won 13–11 to secure his second major BDO title. Also in 2005, King made the final of the World Darts Trophy for the second time and on this occasion he was beaten again losing 4–6 against Gary Robson. This was to be King's last major final before his controversial switch to the Professional Darts Corporation.

In 2006, King's form declined and his best result came in the 2006 World Darts Trophy where he made the quarter-finals narrowly losing to Michael van Gerwen 4–5. He also made only the second round in the 2006 BDO World Darts Championship whitewashing Brian Woods 3 sets to 0 before losing to eventual champion Jelle Klaasen 2–4. His last tournament as a BDO affiliated player came in the 2007 BDO World Darts Championship where he made the semi-finals before losing 4–5 against eventual champion Martin Adams. King was surrounded by controversy during this tournament following speculation about his future and a possible switch to the PDC. This would prove to be his last tournament as a BDO player.

== PDC career ==
=== PDC switch and beginnings ===
King's switch from the BDO to rival organization the Professional Darts Corporation (PDC) created much debate and controversy. During the 2007 BDO World Darts Championship there was much speculation that King and three fellow BDO players (Michael van Gerwen, Jelle Klaasen and Vincent van der Voort) would be switching to the PDC after the World Championships. King was angry that rumours had surfaced and even threatened to quit the tournament as the speculation heightened even stating, "I'm really not happy with the treatment I've had today, not just from one person but from a lot of people who I have known for many years". Despite claiming to BDO press officer Robert Holmes that he would "rather pack up darts than play for the PDC" King announced his switch to the PDC on 6 February 2007 in a bid to "further his career". Having reached the semi-final of the 2007 BDO World Championships losing to eventual champion Martin Adams, King had signed a contract confirming he would play at the 2008 tournament due to a clause in all contracts of BDO players stating that if they reach the semi-finals of the World Championship they are obliged to return the following year, with champions committing themselves to three years. King's switch meant that the BDO threatened legal action against King.

King made his PDC debut at a non-televised event, the Southern Regional Final of the UK Open on 4 March 2007. He reached the quarter-finals before losing to Wayne Mardle. During his first year in the PDC, he performed well on the 2007 PDC Pro Tour, reaching one final, two semi-finals and four quarter-finals. He also gained a place in the 2007 World Matchplay where he reached the quarter-finals before losing to eventual champion James Wade. His performances in his first year helped him steadily climb the world rankings and qualify for his first PDC World Championship.

=== 2008 ===
In his debut at the 2008 PDC World Darts Championship, he fell to Dutchman Roland Scholten in the second round. 2008 proved a successful year for King as he reached two semi-finals in PDC premier events as well as his maiden PDC premier final in the inaugural 2008 Championship League Darts where he lost 7–5 to Phil Taylor. His first PDC title came at the Scottish Players Championship in Glasgow in April 2008 where he beat Taylor on his way to a 3–0 victory over Mark Dudbridge. He also won a Pro Tour title in the Netherlands, beating Raymond van Barneveld. He also had two semi-final appearances in the 2008 World Grand Prix and the 2008 Grand Slam of Darts losing to Raymond van Barneveld and Phil Taylor respectively. King ended the year and went into the 2009 PDC World Darts Championship as world number 13 in the PDC Order of Merit. His first year performances saw him win the Best Newcomer prize at the annual PDC awards dinner.

=== 2009 ===
King went into 2009 competing in the 2009 PDC World Darts Championship, and this turned out to be his best result in the PDC World Championship to date. He beat Barrie Bates in the quarter-finals before falling to Phil Taylor 2–6 with Taylor averaging 103.44. His performance in the World Championship meant that he moved up to 6 in the PDC Order of Merit and therefore qualified automatically for the 2009 Premier League Darts.

King carried on his good form into the 2009 World Matchplay in July. He defeated Mark Dudbridge, Steve Beaton and Vincent van der Voort before meeting Phil Taylor in the semi-final. Taylor prevailed 17–6, averaging 106.54, and went on to win the tournament. In the next PDC Premier event of the 2009 season, the 2009 European Championship, he reached the quarter-final before losing to James Wade 6–10. This was after beating Colin Osborne in the second round 9–6 recording a 104.00 average. King's successful run in the 2008 Championship League Darts continued into the 2009 tournament as he reached the semi-final before losing to eventual champion Colin Osborne 1–6.

Also in 2009, King achieved his first televised nine dart finish. It came in September 2009 at the South African Masters against James Wade, and was the first ever televised nine dart finish outside of Europe.

==== 2009 Premier League ====
King made a great start to his Premier League career as he opened up with an 8–1 victory over Sky wildcard Wayne Mardle. He then went on to record three more victories on the bounce beating James Wade 8–1, John Part 8–2 and Jelle Klaasen 8–4. He then faced defending champion Phil Taylor in Newcastle, recording a 7–7 draw despite leading 7–5 with both players averaging over 100. King's form then dropped, only winning two more games in Birmingham and Glasgow against Mardle and Wade respectively. King was also a controversial figure during the tournament, often letting the crowd get to him and affect his mood and darts. During a 2009 Premier League match with Taylor, he threw a dart over Taylor as he stooped down to pick up his flight. During the post-match interview, neither of them would look at each other. His final position of 4th in the league was influenced by the illness of Mardle, as he was withdrawn from the competition. Therefore, all results that included Mardle were annulled, including King's two victories over Mardle. King's fourth place in the overall league meant that he faced Taylor in the play-off semi-finals at the Wembley Arena. King won 10–6 to end Taylor's winning streak in Premier League competitions. Despite this victory he was to finish runner-up as he lost the final 13–8 to Wade, who beat Raymond van Barneveld 10–8 in the other semi-final. Wade led King 8–2 before a mini comeback from King but Wade was able to see the game out to claim his maiden Premier League Darts title.

=== 2010 ===
King went into the 2010 World Championship as number 5 in the PDC Order of Merit. Despite a poor performance in the tournament, where he lost 2–4 in the second round to Co Stompé, he still qualified for the 2010 Premier League Darts King reached his third PDC major final in the 2010 Players Championship Finals. Having beaten James Wade, Jelle Klaasen, Wayne Jones and Colin Osborne in earlier rounds, he narrowly lost in the final to Paul Nicholson 13–11. This was his third PDC Premier event final without victory. King also reached the last 16 in the 2010 UK Open, losing 8–9 to Gary Anderson. King hit his second televised nine-dart finish during the match.

==== 2010 Premier League ====
King started the 2010 Premier League with wins over James Wade and Adrian Lewis. His first loss of the season came in Belfast as he lost 6–8 to Ronnie Baxter. His rivalry with Phil Taylor continued in Manchester, where King recorded a 7–7 draw. King lost his last three round-robin matches to Taylor, Raymond van Barneveld and Simon Whitlock, but he still made it to the semi-finals for the second consecutive year, again finishing 4th in the table. He finished on the same number of points as Baxter, but qualified due to a better leg difference. Just like in the previous year, he played against Taylor in the semi-final. This time, Taylor resoundingly won 8–1, averaging 107.98 in the process Despite losing badly against Taylor, King beat Whitlock in the third-place play-off.

=== 2011 ===
King went into the 2011 World Championship ranked 6th in the PDC Order of Merit. His World Championship campaign was ended in the second round, where he was beaten 3–4 by Andy Smith. After the World Championship, King dropped out of the automatic qualifying places for the 2011 Premier League Darts, and was not awarded a wildcard. His successful streak in the Players Championship Finals continued as he again reached the semi-final for the second consecutive year. He lost in the semi-final to Phil Taylor 8–10. He lost in the third round of the 2011 UK Open tournament, losing 9–5 to Mark Walsh. He qualified for the 2011 World Matchplay Darts as the 9th seed., but lost 6–10 against Justin Pipe in the first round, reporting a complaint of tennis elbow. At the 2011 European Championship, he beat Co Stompé 6–1 in the first round, before losing 3–10 to Taylor in the second round. He also qualified for the 2011 Championship League Darts winner's group by beating Simon Whitlock 6–3 in the final of group five. In the winner's group finished second in the table before losing to Paul Nicholson in the semi-final. At the Players Championship Finals in December, he beat Colin Lloyd 6–4 to meet Phil Taylor in the second round. King produced his second victory over Taylor in major competitions with an 8–5 win. However, he lost in the quarter-finals to eventual winner Kevin Painter.

=== 2012 ===
King played Geoff Kime in the first round of the 2012 World Championship and outplayed his opponent, winning 3–0 without dropping a leg. However, he was knocked out in the second round for the third successive year as he was beaten 1–4 by Michael van Gerwen. At the UK Open King beat his old BDO rival Ted Hankey and Gareth Cousins, before losing 7–9 to van Gerwen in the last 32. Due to dropping out of the top 16 in the PDC rankings, King was due to play seed Phil Taylor in the first round of the 2012 World Matchplay. Despite a strong performance where he hit eight maximums to Taylor's one, King crucially missed three darts to lead the match 9–8 and instead lost 8–10.

At the World Grand Prix in October, King reached his first major final in two years. In his first round match against Terry Jenkins, King survived five missed match darts from his opponent to edge the game 2–1 in sets, and then saw off Dave Chisnall (3–1) and Robert Thornton (3–0 in 31 minutes) to meet home favourite Brendan Dolan in the semi-finals. King came back from 0–2 down in the first set to take it and from there was in control of the match as he won 5–2 and met Michael van Gerwen in the final. King led 3–0 and 4–1 in the final, but from there on only won three more legs as he lost the match 4–6. King afterwards admitted he was unhappy with the crowd, as they were loudly booing his starting and finishing doubles, but the £40,000 runner-up prize saw him climb to 13th in the world.

King won all three of his group games at the Grand Slam of Darts, but was defeated by Kevin Painter 5–10 in the last 16. After all 33 ProTour events of 2012 had been played, King was 20th on the Order of Merit, comfortably inside the top 32 who qualified for the Players Championship Finals. He reached the quarter-finals, where he lost 7–10 to Justin Pipe.

=== 2013 ===
King lost in the first round of the PDC World Championship for the first time in its 2013 edition 2–3 to Dean Winstanley. The match has been described as a classic with both players missing darts to win before Winstanley took the deciding set 6–4. His first final of the year came at the eighth UK Open Qualifier in April, having won seven games including defeats over James Wade, Wes Newton and Robert Thornton, but he was then whitewashed 0–6 by Michael van Gerwen. He was the seventh seed for the UK Open itself. King reached the final of the Austrian Darts Open by beating Joe Cullen 6–0 in the quarter-finals with an average of 103.66 and Steve Beaton 6–5 in the semis. He faced van Gerwen once more in the final and was defeated 3–6. He also played van Gerwen in the third round of the UK Open and was defeated 5–9. King's second European Tour final of the year came in September at the German Darts Masters where he edged past Peter Wright 6–5 in the third round, whitewashed James Wade 6–0 in the quarter-finals and beat Wayne Jones 6–4 in the semis. He faced Steve Beaton and with the final on throw with Beaton 4–3 ahead King incredibly burst his score when on 134 as he hit a treble 20 with his last dart instead of a single to leave 40. Beaton replied by finishing 160 and, even though King fought back to take the match into a deciding leg, he never had a dart for the title as Beaton won 6–5. King could not replicate his performances at the World Grand Prix from last year as he was defeated 2–0 in sets by Wayne Jones in the first round.

=== 2014 ===
King overcame Darin Young and Ricky Evans to face Adrian Lewis in the third round of the 2014 World Championship. He lost nine of the first eleven legs and could never recover as he was beaten 4–1 in sets. King's first final of the year came in February at the Dutch Darts Masters, but he was defeated 6–4 by Michael van Gerwen whilst averaging 107.40. Despite playing with a bad sciatica in his back, King reached the semi-finals of the UK Open for the first time in his career. He fell 3–0 down to Lewis and was denied a place in the final with a 10–6 defeat. In the first round of the World Matchplay, King was 5–4 ahead of Kim Huybrechts and then won five legs in a row to advance 10–4 with an average of 101.06. He could not replicate his form in the next round however, as he averaged 89.59 in a 13–8 loss to Lewis. In September, King ended a run of three defeats in European Tour finals to win the European Darts Grand Prix by beating Michael Smith 6–5.

In a tight match in the quarter-finals of the World Grand Prix, King was defeated in a final leg decider against Van Gerwen as he was unable to checkout 120. He went a stage further at the European Championship, but lost 11–8 to Terry Jenkins. King continued his fine form at the Masters by beating Simon Whitlock and Justin Pipe and then produced a superb performance to exact revenge over Van Gerwen 11–9 with a 121 finish on the bull. He built on his momentum in the final against James Wade to lead 5–0 after the first session with an average of 110 and was also 9–2 in front. Wade rallied to trail 9–6 before a 158 finish from King saw him stand one leg away from his first PDC major title. However, he would miss a total of eight championship darts as Wade completed his comeback with an 11–10 win. The misses didn't seem to affect him at the Grand Slam, as he punished every mistake from Gary Anderson in a second round 10–4 win and then beat Stephen Bunting 16–9 to face Phil Taylor in the semi-finals. King couldn't keep pace with Taylor as he fell 12–2 down and, though he briefly rallied, was eliminated 16–9. Taylor also knocked King out of the Players Championship Finals, 10–7 in the second round.

=== 2015 ===
King suffered a surprise 3–2 defeat to German teenager Max Hopp in the first round of the 2015 World Championship. He lost 10–3 in the first round of the Masters to James Wade. King showed his best battling abilities at the UK Open to defeat Gary Anderson 9–8 after being 8–4 down and surviving 13 match darts from Anderson. He then overturned an 8–5 deficit against Nathan Derry to win 9–8 and emerged successfully from a deciding leg for the third game in a row by beating Kyle Anderson 9–8 to reach the quarter-finals. He met Stephen Bunting and the first 12 legs went on throw, before Bunting took four unanswered legs to inflict a 10–6 defeat on King. The rest of 2015 proved to be disappointing for King as he was eliminated at the first round stage of the World Matchplay, World Grand Prix, European Championship and Players Championship Finals and could not get out of his group at the Grand Slam.

=== 2016 ===
After edging out Russia's Aleksandr Oreshkin 3–2 in the first round of the 2016 World Championship, King lost 4–2 to Jelle Klaasen in round two. He won through to the semi-finals of the Dutch Darts Masters, which included recovering from 5–0 down to Benito van de Pas in the quarters to win 6–5, and was beaten 6–2 by Michael van Gerwen. He lost 9–7 to Van de Pas in the third round of the UK Open. King inflicted James Wade's first ever first round defeat at the World Matchplay by beating him 10–5 and then saw off Brendan Dolan 11–8 to play in the quarter-finals of the event for the first time in seven years. In an extremely tight match he narrowly lost 16–14 to Phil Taylor, with the 16-time world champion stating that it was the best he had seen King play for two or three years. He lost in the opening round of both the World Grand Prix and Players Championship Finals and James Wilson edged out King 10–9 in the second round of the European Championship.

=== 2017 ===
King was on the brink of being knocked out in the first round of the 2017 World Championship as he was 2–0 down in sets to Steve West. In the third set, West was on 36 for the match, but King took out a 136 finish, won the set and levelled the match at 2–2. In the deciding set West missed two match darts and King would win 3–2 and was in tears on stage afterwards. In the second round Michael Smith missed five darts to beat King 4–1. King then hit a match saving 130 checkout to help him close to 3–3 and Smith missed three more match darts in the deciding set, but eventually got over the line to edge King out 4–3. King reached his first final since 2014 at the third Players Championship and was defeated 6–5 by Rob Cross.

=== 2018 ===
At the 2018 World Championship, King lost 3–2 in the first round to Zoran Lerchbacher.

=== 2019 ===
At the 2019 World Championship, King lost 4–2 in the third round to Brendan Dolan.

He reached the quarter-finals of the World Matchplay, beating defending champion Gary Anderson en route, before losing to Michael Smith.

King also reached the quarter-finals of the World Grand Prix and Players Championship Finals.

=== 2020 ===
At the 2020 World Championship, King lost 4–1 in the third round to Simon Whitlock.

In November he reached his first major final in 6 years at the Players Championships Finals, where he eventually lost 11–10 to defending champion Michael van Gerwen.

=== 2021 ===
At the 2021 World Championship, King lost 4–1 in the fourth round to eventual champion Gerwyn Price.

At the Masters, he lost 11–8 in the final to Jonny Clayton, in a game where the PDC announced beforehand that the winner would claim the final wildcard spot in the 2021 Premier League Darts. Clayton would go on to win the Premier League that year.

=== 2022 ===
At the 2022 World Championship, King had his best run since 2009 by beating Ryan Joyce, Steve Lennon and Raymond Smith, but was eventually whitewashed 5–0 in the quarterfinals by James Wade.

=== 2023 ===
At the 2023 World Championship, King began his campaign with a 3–2 win over Danny Baggish, before losing 4–1 to former world champion Rob Cross in the third round.

At the UK Open, King was knocked out in the fifth round 10–8 by Dimitri van den Bergh.

King would later enter the Tour Card Holders Qualifier for the 2024 World Championship, as he sat outside of the top 32 on both the PDC Order of Merit and Pro Tour Order of Merit. He was eliminated in the last 32 by Pascal Rupprecht 6–5.

This meant King failed to qualify for a World Championship for the first time since 1996.

=== 2024 ===
King made the 6th round at the UK Open, where he lost to eventual runner-up and newly crowned World Champion Luke Humphries 10–4.

King reached the quarterfianls stage of Players Championship 23 in September. He was defeated to eventual winner Dave Chisnall 6–2.

King again entered the Tour Card Holder Qualifier for the 2025 World Championship. He lost to Matt Campbell 7–6 in a deciding leg.

The loss meant King lost his PDC Tour Card after 14 years.

=== 2025 ===
After unsuccessfully attempting to try regain his Tour Card at 2025 PDC Q-School, King subsequently focused his efforts on the PDC Challenge Tour. He won the 11th event with a 5–0 final victory over Henry Coates. King reached two other finals during the season at Challenge Tour 4 and 15, where he lost to Darius Labanauskas and Jack Tweddell respectively. These results led to regular call-ups to Players Championship events to cover the absence of Tour Card holders; he again reached the quarter-finals of Players Championship 23. King finished the 2025 Challenge Tour season in fourth place on the Order of Merit ranking, which earned him qualification to the 2026 World Championship.

Outside of the PDC, King participated in the 2025 World Seniors Championship in February, but was eliminated in the first round by Derek Coulson 3–1. King also competed in the 2025 World Seniors Champion of Champions in June, where he started off with a 5–2 win over Kevin Painter, but lost 5–1 in the quarterfinals to defending Champion, Richie Howson. King was slotted to meet Martin Adams in the first round of the 2025 World Seniors Matchplay come November. But the WSD cancelled the tournament, after the organisation collapsed in August.

King also won week 9 of Series 10 in the MODUS Super Series, a weekly 12-player darts tournament, by defeating Steve West 4–2 in the final.

=== 2026 ===
King met Ian White in the first round at the 2026 World Championship and fought back from 2–0 down to level the match at 2–all, but was whitewashed in the final set to lose 3–2.

King would successfully regain his PDC Tour Card at Q-School in January.

== World Championship performances ==
King has reached two World Championship finals and four semi-finals since making his debut in the BDO version in 1997. He went as far as the semi-final in his debut year, losing to eventual champion Les Wallace. During his run he hit thirty 180s, setting a new record for the tournament at the time. Since switching to the PDC, his best performance came in the 2009 World Championship when he reached the semi-final, losing 2–6 to Phil Taylor.

He reached his first BDO World Championship final in 2002. He narrowly beat Raymond van Barneveld 5–3 in the quarter-finals. In the semi-finals he convincingly beat Colin Monk 5–1. He lost the final 4–6 to Tony David. King spoke on David's performance congratulating him and commented, "I just wish I could have played half as well as he did."

In 2003, King beat Steve Coote, Dennis Harbour and Monk before losing to van Barneveld 5–2 in the semi-finals.

In 2004, King again reached the world final. During his run he beat Rick Hofstra 3–1, Jarkko Komula 3–2, Ritchie Davies 5–4, Tony O'Shea 5–1, before meeting Andy Fordham in the final. The match ended in a 6–3 victory for Fordham, making it the second time in three years that King had finished runner-up. Again King told of his disappointment commenting "I don't think it was a fantastic game. I just did not turn up".

His last appearance at the BDO World Championship was in 2007, where he narrowly lost a semi-final to Martin Adams 5–6.

King's most successful PDC World Championship was in 2009, when he beat Mark Walsh and Dennis Smith before beating Barrie Bates 5–2 in the quarter-finals. This run set up a semi-final clash with Phil Taylor. King lost to Taylor 2–6. However, since then he has been knocked out in the second round every year to Co Stompé, Andy Smith and Michael van Gerwen in 2010, 2011 and 2012 respectively.

At his sole World Seniors Darts World Championship in 2025, King was eliminated in the first round of the tournament to Derek Coulson 3–1.

== Controversy ==
King has been the subject of controversy during his career. In 2003 following his semi-final defeat to Raymond van Barneveld, he subsequently blamed the air conditioning being on. The following year in his first round match against Rick Hofstra, when tied at 1–1 in sets, King complained that the length of the oche was not right; the players were forced to leave the stage whilst officials measured, King was incorrect. The players returned with the majority of the crowd against King, though he went on to win the match 3–1.

In the 2010 Grand Slam of Darts, King played then-BDO player John Henderson in his last group game. Despite winning the game 5–4, he exchanged heated words with Henderson towards the end of the match and was visibly unhappy. Whilst refusing to reveal the precise reason to his actions, it was understood through television analysis that King felt Henderson, after having to move across the oche for a better shot with his third dart, had stepped across the oche line and thrown from a closer distance to the board, thus believing he had gained an unfair advantage.

== Personal life ==
King's father died in September 2010, which King later admitted left him 'devastated', and this led to a loss of form. At the 2011 PDC World Darts Championship, King's wife cheered him on accompanied by a crown in remembrance of his father.

King is good friends with and lives close to fellow darts player Peter Wright and they often practise together. He lives in Bradwell in Norfolk. He is also a keen motor enthusiast and revealed that when younger he gave up his chance of becoming a racing driver to continue his fledgling darts career. King currently travels and practises with upcoming darts player and 2012 World Youth Champion James Hubbard, whom King has described as a player to watch in the future.

During the first lockdown of the COVID-19 pandemic in the United Kingdom in 2020, King undertook work as a delivery driver for online retail company Amazon, and in 2021 set up a construction company.

In 2025 King was declared insolvent. His financial troubles stemmed from him believing the money he made during his darts career were winnings rather than earnings and exempt from income tax. It was reported that as a consequence, King failed to pay tax correctly for c. 20 years.

== Awards ==
- PDC Newcomer of the Year 2008.
- PDC Televised Performance of the Year 2009 (v Phil Taylor, Premier League Darts Semi-Final).

== World Championship results ==
=== BDO ===
- 1997 – Semi-finals (lost to Les Wallace 3–5)
- 1998 – Second round (lost to Ted Hankey 0–3)
- 1999 – First round (lost to Andy Fordham 2–3)
- 2000 – Quarter-finals (lost to Co Stompé 2–5)
- 2001 – Second round (lost to John Walton 0–3)
- 2002 – Runner-up (lost to Tony David 4–6)
- 2003 – Semi-finals (lost to Raymond van Barneveld 2–5)
- 2004 – Runner-up (lost to Andy Fordham 3–6)
- 2005 – Second round (lost to André Brantjes 2–3)
- 2006 – Second round (lost to Jelle Klaasen 2–4)
- 2007 – Semi-finals (lost to Martin Adams 5–6)

=== PDC ===
- 2008: Second round (lost to Roland Scholten 2–4)
- 2009: Semi-finals (lost to Phil Taylor 2–6)
- 2010: Second round (lost to Co Stompé 2–4)
- 2011: Second round (lost to Andy Smith 3–4)
- 2012: Second round (lost to Michael van Gerwen 1–4)
- 2013: First round (lost to Dean Winstanley 2–3)
- 2014: Third round (lost to Adrian Lewis 1–4)
- 2015: First round (lost to Max Hopp 2–3)
- 2016: Second round (lost to Jelle Klaasen 2–4)
- 2017: Second round (lost to Michael Smith 3–4)
- 2018: First round (lost to Zoran Lerchbacher 2–3)
- 2019: Third round (lost to Brendan Dolan 2–4)
- 2020: Third round (lost to Simon Whitlock 1–4)
- 2021: Fourth round (lost to Gerwyn Price 1–4)
- 2022: Quarter-finals (lost to James Wade 0–5)
- 2023: Third round (lost to Rob Cross 1–4)
- 2026: First round (lost to Ian White 2–3)

=== WSD ===
- 2025: Last 28 (lost to Derek Coulson 1–3)

== Career finals ==
=== BDO major finals: 12 (3 titles) ===
Legend
World Championship (0–2)
World Masters (1–1)
World Darts Trophy (0–2)
International Darts League (1–1)
Zuiderduin Masters (1–3)

Outcome	No.	Year	Championship	Opponent in the final	Score (Note: (l) = score in legs, (s) = score in sets.)
Runner-up	1.	1996	Zuiderduin Masters	(England) Martin Adams	2–4 (s)
Runner-up	2.	2000	World Masters	(England) John Walton	2–3 (s)
Runner-up	3.	2002	World Championship	(Australia) Tony David	4–6 (s)
Runner-up	4.	2002	Zuiderduin Masters	(Australia) Tony David	4–6 (s)
Runner-up	5.	2003	International Darts League	(Netherlands) Raymond van Barneveld	5–8 (s)
Runner-up	6.	2003	World Darts Trophy	(Netherlands) Raymond van Barneveld	2–6 (s)
Runner-up	7.	2003	Zuiderduin Masters	(Netherlands) Raymond van Barneveld	1–6 (s)
Runner-up	8.	2004	World Championship	(England) Andy Fordham	3–6 (s)
Winner	1.	2004	World Masters	(England) Tony O'Shea	7–6 (s)
Winner	2.	2005	International Darts League	(England) Tony O'Shea	13–11 (s)
Runner-up	9.	2005	World Darts Trophy	(England) Gary Robson	4–6 (s)
Winner	3.	2005	Zuiderduin Masters	(England) Martin Adams	5–4 (s)

=== PDC major finals: 7 ===
Legend
World Grand Prix (0–1)
Premier League (0–1)
Masters (0–2)
Players Championship Finals (0–2)
Championship League (0–1)

Outcome	No.	Year	Championship	Opponent in the final	Score
Runner-up	1.	2008	Championship League	Phil Taylor	5–7 (l)
Runner-up	2.	2009	Premier League	James Wade	8–13 (l)
Runner-up	3.	2010	Players Championship Finals	Paul Nicholson	11–13 (l)
Runner-up	4.	2012	World Grand Prix	Michael van Gerwen	4–6 (s)
Runner-up	5.	2014	Masters	James Wade	10–11 (l)
Runner-up	6.	2020	Players Championship Finals (2)	Michael van Gerwen	10–11 (l)
Runner-up	7.	2021	Masters (2)	Jonny Clayton	8–11 (l)

== Career statistics ==
=== Performance timeline ===
Mervyn King's performance timeline is as follows:

==== BDO ====
Tournament	1994	1995	1996	1997	1998	1999	2000	2001	2002	2003	2004	2005	2006	2007
BDO Ranked televised events
World Championship	Did not qualify			SF	2R	1R	QF	2R	F	SF	F	2R	2R	SF
International Darts League	Not held									F	SF	W	RR	RR
World Darts Trophy	Not held								2R	F	SF	F	QF	SF
World Masters	3R	4R	1R	4R	QF	SF	F	4R	4R	QF	W	4R	2R	PDC
Finder Darts Masters	Not held						RR	QF	F	F	SF	W	NH	PDC
Year-end ranking	-	-	-	5	6	3	1	4	3	3	3	1	5	

==== PDC ====
Tournament	2007	2008	2009	2010	2011		2012	2013	2014	2015	2016	2017	2018	2019	2020	2021	2022	2023	2024	2025	2026
PDC Ranked televised events
World Championship	BDO	2R	SF	2R	2R		2R	1R	3R	1R	2R	2R	1R	3R	3R	4R	QF	3R	DNQ		1R
UK Open	6R	3R	3R	5R	3R		4R	3R	SF	QF	3R	3R	5R	5R	4R	4R	4R	5R	6R	DNP	2R
World Matchplay	QF	1R	SF	1R	1R		1R	1R	2R	1R	QF	1R	1R	QF	DNQ	1R	Did not qualify				
World Grand Prix	2R	SF	2R	1R	1R		F	1R	QF	1R	1R	2R	1R	QF	2R	2R	Did not qualify				
European Championship	NH	1R	QF	1R	2R		1R	2R	SF	2R	2R	1R	1R	1R	1R	1R	Did not qualify				
Grand Slam (Note: A non-ranked event until 2015)	2R	SF	2R	2R	RR		2R	2R	SF	RR	Did not qualify					RR	Did not qualify				
Players Championship Finals	Not held		QF	F	SF	QF	QF	1R	2R	1R	1R	2R	2R	QF	F	1R	1R	DNQ	1R	DNQ	
PDC Non-ranked televised events
Premier League	DNP		F	SF	Did not participate																
Masters (Note: A ranked event from 2025)	Not held							1R	F	1R	Did not qualify					F	1R	Did not qualify			Prel.
World Series Finals	Not held									Did not qualify						QF	Did not qualify			DNP	DNQ
PDC Past major events
Las Vegas Desert Classic	2R	QF	QF	Not held																	
Masters of Darts	SF	Not held																			
Championship League	NH	F	SF	RR	SF		RR	RR	Not held												
Year-end ranking	25	12	5	6	12		14	14	10	14	22	22	19	19	19	17	28	63	73	110	

==== WSD ====
Tournament	2025
WSD Televised events
World Championship	1R
Champion of Champions	QF

===== European Tour =====
Season	1	2	3	4	5	6	7	8	9	10	11	12	13	
2012	ADO; 1R	GDC; QF	EDO; SF	GDM; 1R	DDM; 2R									
2013	UKM; 2R	EDT; 2R	EDO; 3R	ADO; F	GDT; 1R	GDC; 2R	GDM; F	DDM; 3R						
2014	GDC; 3R	DDM; F	GDM; 2R	ADO; 2R	GDT; 2R	EDO; 3R	EDG; W	EDT; 2R						
2015	GDC; 3R	GDT; QF	GDM; 2R	DDM; QF	IDO; 2R	EDO; 3R	EDT; QF	EDM; 3R	EDG; 3R					
2016	DDM; SF	GDM; DNQ	GDT; 3R	EDM; 2R	ADO; 1R	EDO; DNQ	IDO; DNQ	EDT; 1R	EDG; DNQ	GDC; 1R				
2017	GDC; 2R	GDM; 2R	GDO; 3R	EDG; 1R	GDT; DNQ	EDM; 3R	ADO; QF	EDO; F	DDM; 2R	GDG; 2R	IDO; 3R	EDT; 2R		
2018	EDO; QF	GDG; 2R	GDO; QF	ADO; 3R	EDG; 2R	DDM; 3R	GDT; 2R	DDO; QF	EDM; 2R	GDC; 2R	DDC; 3R	IDO; 2R	EDT; 2R	
2019	EDO; 2R	GDC; 3R	GDG; DNQ	GDO; DNQ	ADO; 2R	EDG; 2R	DDM; QF	DDO; 1R	CDO; QF	Did not qualify				
2020	BDC; QF	GDC; SF	EDG; 2R	IDO; DNQ										
2021	HDT; DNQ	GDT; 2R												
2022	IDO; 2R	Did not qualify						DDC; QF	EDM; 1R	HDT; DNQ	GDO; DNQ	BDO; 2R	GDT; DNQ	
2024	BDO; DNQ	GDG; DNQ	IDO; 1R	Did not qualify										
2026	Did not qualify								SDO; 1R	Did not qualify				DDC

===== Players Championships =====
Season	1	2	3	4	5	6	7	8	9	10	11	12	13	14	15	16	17	18	19	20	21	22	23	24	25	26	27	28	29	30	31	32	33	34
2012	ALI; 2R	ALI; 1R	REA; QF	REA; 2R	CRA; 1R	CRA; QF	BIR; 3R	BIR; QF	CRA; 2R	CRA; 1R	BAR; QF	BAR; 2R	DUB; 3R	DUB; QF	KIL; DNP		CRA; 3R	CRA; 3R	BAR; DNP	BAR; 4R														
2013	WIG; 4R	WIG; 1R	WIG; 4R	WIG; 2R	CRA; 1R	CRA; 3R	BAR; QF	BAR; QF	DUB; 3R	DUB; QF	DNP				BAR; 4R	BAR; 2R																		
2014	BAR; SF	BAR; 1R	CRA; 2R	CRA; SF	WIG; QF	WIG; 2R	WIG; 4R	WIG; 4R	CRA; QF	CRA; 2R	COV; 3R	COV; 4R	CRA; QF	CRA; DNP	DUB; 3R	DUB; 2R	CRA; 2R	CRA; 1R	COV; 2R	COV; 4R														
2015	BAR; 1R	BAR; 1R	BAR; 2R	BAR; 4R	BAR; 4R	COV; 1R	COV; 3R	COV; 4R	CRA; QF	CRA; 3R	BAR; 1R	BAR; QF	WIG; 3R	WIG; 2R	BAR; 2R	BAR; 3R	DUB; 3R	DUB; 3R	COV; 3R	COV; 2R														
2016	BAR; 1R	BAR; 2R	BAR; 4R	BAR; 1R	BAR; 2R	BAR; 1R	BAR; 1R	COV; 3R	COV; 4R	BAR; 3R	BAR; 3R	BAR; 3R	BAR; 1R	BAR; QF	BAR; 1R	BAR; 1R	DUB; 2R	DUB; 3R	BAR; 3R	BAR; 2R														
2017	BAR; 4R	BAR; 2R	BAR; F	BAR; 1R	MIL; 1R	MIL; SF	BAR; 3R	BAR; SF	WIG; 2R	WIG; 2R	MIL; 3R	MIL; 2R	WIG; 3R	WIG; 1R	BAR; 4R	BAR; 1R	BAR; 4R	BAR; DNP	DUB; 2R	DUB; 1R	BAR; 1R	BAR; 3R												
2018	BAR; 2R	BAR; 3R	BAR; 1R	BAR; 1R	MIL; 1R	MIL; SF	BAR; 1R	BAR; 1R	WIG; 1R	WIG; 1R	MIL; 2R	MIL; 4R	WIG; 3R	WIG; 2R	BAR; W	BAR; 3R	BAR; 2R	BAR; 4R	DUB; 1R	DUB; 2R	BAR; 1R	BAR; 3R												
2019	WIG; 2R	WIG; 2R	WIG; SF	WIG; 1R	BAR; 3R	BAR; 2R	WIG; 1R	WIG; 4R	BAR; 2R	BAR; QF	BAR; 1R	BAR; 1R	BAR; 1R	BAR; 2R	BAR; 1R	BAR; 1R	WIG; 3R	WIG; 2R	BAR; 1R	BAR; 2R	HIL; 3R	HIL; 1R	BAR; 3R	BAR; 3R	BAR; 3R	BAR; 3R	DUB; 1R	DUB; 1R	BAR; 3R	BAR; 2R				
2020	BAR; 2R	BAR; 2R	WIG; 1R	WIG; 1R	WIG; 2R	WIG; 2R	BAR; 1R	BAR; 3R	MIL; 2R	MIL; 2R	MIL; 1R	MIL; 1R	MIL; 1R	NIE; 4R	NIE; 4R	NIE; 3R	NIE; 3R	NIE; 1R	COV; 2R	COV; 3R	COV; 3R	COV; 2R	COV; DNP											
2021	BOL; 1R	BOL; 2R	BOL; 3R	BOL; 3R	MIL; 2R	MIL; 4R	MIL; 2R	MIL; 1R	NIE; 4R	NIE; 1R	NIE; 2R	NIE; 2R	MIL; 3R	MIL; 4R	MIL; 4R	MIL; 3R	COV; QF	COV; QF	COV; 2R	COV; DNP	BAR; 1R	BAR; 2R	BAR; 2R	BAR; 4R	BAR; QF	BAR; 2R	BAR; DNP	BAR; 1R	BAR; DNP					
2022	BAR; 3R	BAR; 1R	WIG; 1R	WIG; 2R	BAR; 4R	BAR; 2R	NIE; 2R	NIE; 3R	BAR; 1R	BAR; 3R	BAR; 3R	BAR; 1R	BAR; 2R	WIG; 3R	WIG; 2R	NIE; 1R	NIE; 2R	BAR; DNP	BAR; 2R	BAR; 1R	BAR; 3R	BAR; 2R	BAR; 3R	BAR; 2R	BAR; QF	BAR; 1R	BAR; 1R	BAR; 2R	BAR; 2R	BAR; 1R				
2023	BAR; 2R	BAR; 1R	BAR; 1R	BAR; 1R	BAR; 2R	BAR; 1R	HIL; 1R	HIL; 2R	WIG; 2R	WIG; 2R	LEI; 1R	LEI; 2R	HIL; 2R	HIL; 1R	LEI; 1R	LEI; DNP	HIL; 1R	HIL; 2R	BAR; 1R	BAR; 3R	BAR; 1R	BAR; 1R	BAR; 2R	BAR; 3R	BAR; 4R	BAR; 4R	BAR; 1R	BAR; 3R	BAR; 1R	BAR; 2R				
2024	WIG; 3R	WIG; 1R	LEI; 1R	LEI; 2R	HIL; 1R	HIL; 1R	LEI; 1R	LEI; 1R	HIL; 1R	HIL; 2R	HIL; 3R	HIL; 2R	MIL; 1R	MIL; 3R	MIL; 1R	MIL; 2R	MIL; 2R	MIL; 1R	MIL; 3R	WIG; 2R	WIG; 1R	MIL; 2R	MIL; QF	WIG; 2R	WIG; 3R	WIG; 1R	WIG; 1R	WIG; 4R	LEI; 1R	LEI; 3R				
2025 (Note: Not a Tour card holder)	WIG; DNP	WIG; 1R	ROS; 1R	ROS; 2R	LEI; DNP		HIL; 3R	HIL; 1R	LEI; DNP				ROS; 1R	ROS; 1R	HIL; DNP		LEI; 1R	LEI; 4R	LEI; 1R	LEI; 1R	LEI; 1R	HIL; 1R	HIL; QF	MIL; 1R	MIL; 1R	HIL; 3R	HIL; 1R	LEI; 3R	LEI; 2R	LEI; 1R	WIG; DNP		WIG; 1R	WIG; 1R
2026	HIL; 1R	HIL; 2R	WIG; 1R	WIG; 3R	LEI; 1R	LEI; 1R	LEI; 1R	LEI; 4R	WIG; 1R	WIG; 2R	MIL; 1R	MIL; 2R	HIL; 1R	HIL; 1R	LEI; 3R	LEI; 2R	LEI; 1R	LEI; 2R	MIL; 4R	MIL; 4R	WIG; 2R	WIG; 2R	LEI; 1R	LEI; 3R	HIL; 3R	HIL; 1R	LEI; 1R	LEI; 1R	ROS; 1R	ROS; 1R	ROS; 1R	ROS; 1R	LEI; 2R	LEI; 1R

===== Challenge Tour =====
Season	1	2	3	4	5	6	7	8	9	10	11	12	13	14	15	16	17	18	19	20	21	22	23	24
2025	QF	L512	L64	F	L512	L32	L128	L64	QF	L16	W	QF	L256	L256	F	L128	L128	L256	L64	L16	L128	L32	L128	SF

Performance Table Legend
W	Won the tournament	F	Finalist	SF	Semifinalist	QF	Quarterfinalist	#R; RR; Prel.	Lost in # round Round-robin; Preliminary round	DQ	Disqualified
DNQ	Did not qualify	DNP	Did not participate	WD	Withdrew	NH	Tournament not held	#R; RR; Prel.	Lost in # round Round-robin; Preliminary round	NYF	Not yet founded

== Nine-dart finishes ==
Mervyn King's televised nine-dart finishes
Date	Opponent	Tournament	Method	Prize
27 September 2009	(England) James Wade	South African Masters	3 x T20; 3 x T20; T20, T19, D12	£10,000
5 June 2010	(Scotland) Gary Anderson	UK Open	3 x T20; 3 x T20; T20, T19, D12	£5,000
