= Vincent van der Voort =

Dutch darts player

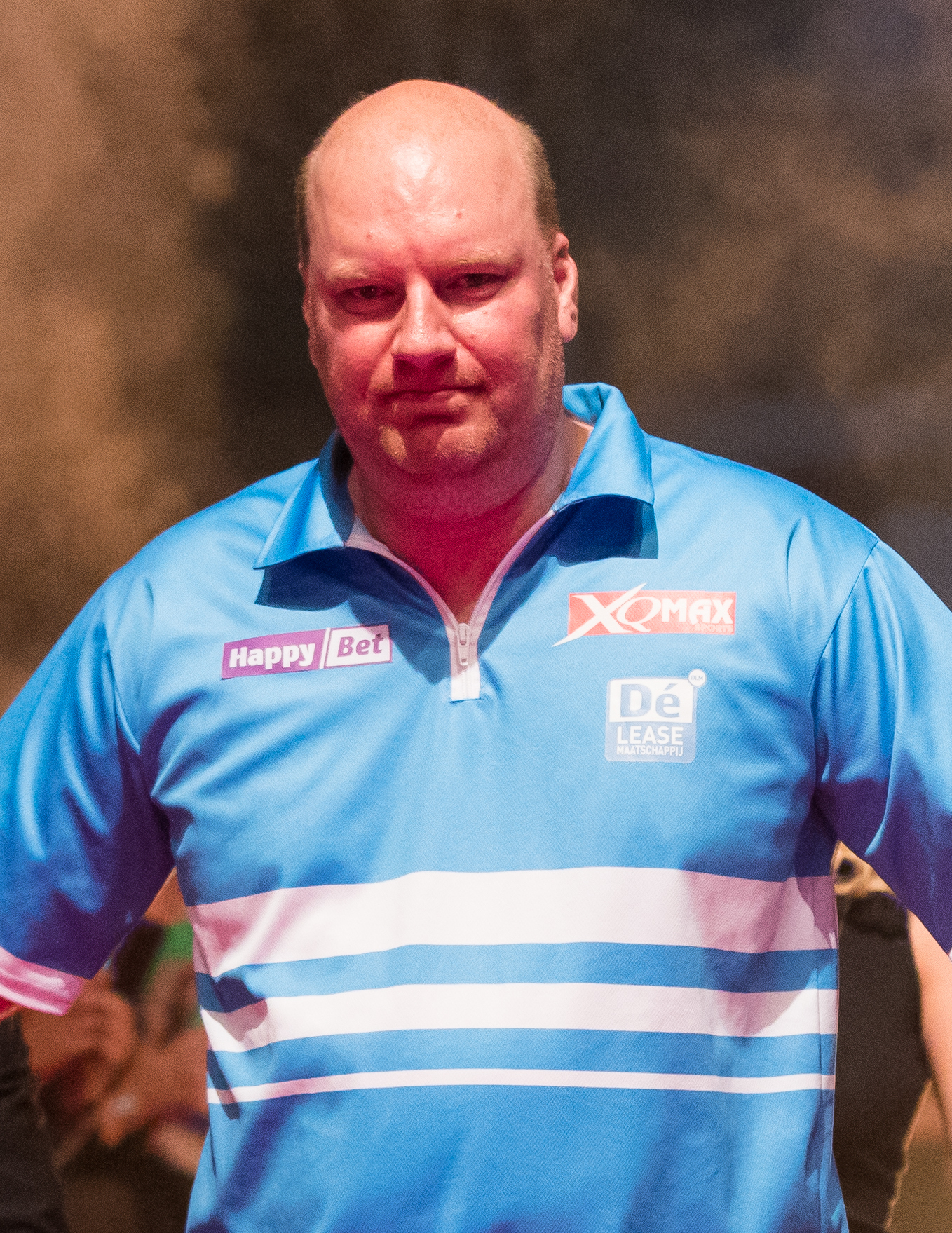
- Van der Voort in 2017

Personal information
- Nickname: "The Dutch Destroyer"
- Born: 18 December 1975 (age 50) Purmerend, Netherlands

Sport
- Sport: Darts
- Playing since: 1985
- Darts: 23g Winmau Signature
- Laterality: Right-handed
- Walk-on music: "Give It Up" by K.C. & The Sunshine Band

Organisation (see split in darts)
- BDO: 2001–2007
- PDC: 2007–2024 (Tour Card: 2011–2024)

WDF major events – best performances
- World Championship: Quarter-final: 2005
- World Masters: Last 32: 2002, 2003
- World Trophy: Last 16: 2003, 2004, 2005, 2006
- Int. Darts League: Last 16 Group: 2004
- Finder Masters: Last 16 Group: 2001

PDC premier events – best performances
- World Championship: Quarter-final: 2011, 2015
- World Matchplay: Quarter-final: 2009, 2020
- World Grand Prix: Quarter-final: 2015
- UK Open: Runner-up: 2007
- Grand Slam: Group Stage: 2007, 2008, 2009, 2010, 2013, 2014
- European Championship: Quarter-final: 2019
- Championship League: Winners Group, 8th: 2008
- Desert Classic: Last 32: 2007, 2009
- US Open/WSoD: Last 32: 2007
- PC Finals: Semi-final: 2014
- Masters: Quarter-final: 2016
- World Series Finals: Last 16: 2020, 2021

Other tournament wins
- Years
Denmark Open	2002, 2006
German Gold Cup	2004
Holland National Championships	2009
Open Lunteren	2009
UK Open Qualifier	2011
WDF Europe Cup Pairs	2004
WDF Europe Youth Cup	1991
WDF World Cup Pairs	2005
European Tour Events
Austrian Darts Open	2014
Players Championships (×3)
2010 (×2), 2011
- Updated on 17 November 2019

Vincent van der Voort (born 18 December 1975) is a Dutch former professional darts player who competed in British Darts Organisation (BDO) then Professional Darts Corporation (PDC) events. He is nicknamed the "Dutch Destroyer", although he used to go by "Grease Lightning". He is best known for his quick throwing style, which is how he got his temporary nickname "the Fastest Player in the World". He has won 4 PDC Pro Tour titles and was the runner-up at the 2007 UK Open, which helped him become a well known face in the world of darts. He is also a three-time World Championship quarter-finalist.

== Playing style ==
Van der Voort is well known for his spasmodic style and machine-gun speed of play which has gained him a reputation in both the BDO and the PDC for being one of the more erratic throwers in the darting world. This ties in with his old entrance music, "Fast Fuse" by English band Kasabian. This has resulted in him tending to be either right on or way off his intended target.

== BDO career ==
His best results in British Darts Organisation events were winning the Danish Open in 2002 and 2006 and reaching the quarter-finals of the BDO World Championship at Frimley Green in 2005, defeating 2004 champion Andy Fordham in the process.

He suffered a first round exit in the 2007 World Championship to unranked qualifier Davy Richardson. It was announced days later that Van der Voort, along with fellow Dutchmen Jelle Klaasen and Michael van Gerwen would be switching to the Professional Darts Corporation (PDC).

== PDC career ==
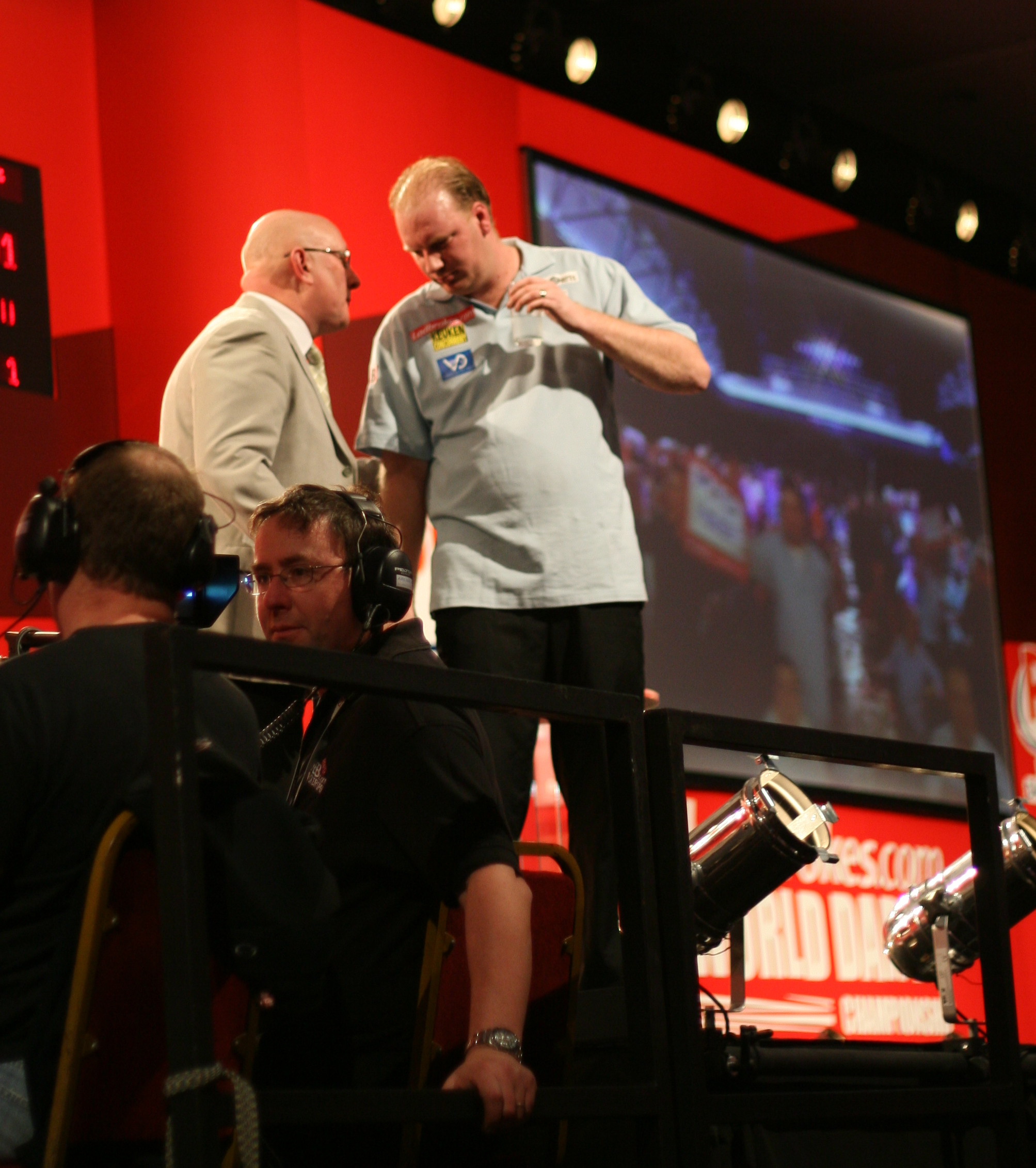
Van der Voort in 2007

Van der Voort produced a superb run to reach the final of the 2007 UK Open before losing in the final to countryman Raymond van Barneveld. The runner-up prize of £15,000 helped him climb up the world rankings having started placed 211 in the PDC and has now made it into the top 20. He qualified for the 2007 Las Vegas Desert Classic but lost in the first round to Peter Manley.

=== 2008 ===
Van der Voort reached the second round of the 2008 PDC World Championship. He played his fellow Dutchman Klaasen in the first round, defeating him 3–2 in sets. Adrian Lewis was his opponent in the second round and Van der Voort lost 4–2. The US Open saw a disappointing 2–3 first round defeat at the hands of John Kuczynski of the US.

The UK Open saw a return to form with Van der Voort making it all the way to the semi-final. He started in the fourth round with a fine 9–4 win over Colin Lloyd. This was followed up in the fifth round with another victory over Klaasen. The quarter final matched him with Chris Thompson and a 10–5 win was enough to see Van der Voort through to the semi-final. In the semi-final, Van der Voort eventually succumbed to a 10–4 defeat by James Wade who went on to win the tournament.

His World Matchplay campaign was ended at the first hurdle. Number 13 seed Alan Tabern won the encounter with a narrow 10–8 victory. The World Grand Prix saw Van der Voort playing former World number 1 Lloyd in the first round and Van der Voort eliminated by a score of 2–0.

Van der Voort won group 6 of the inaugural Championship League with a 7–2 thrashing over Mark Walsh to qualify for the Winners group. He would go on to finish bottom of the group, with only one win from his seven matches.

=== 2009 ===
Van der Voort reached the third round of the 2009 PDC World Championship. He defeated Hungary's Nándor Bezzeg 3–0 in sets and then defeated number 14 seed Colin Osborne in the second round 4–1 assisted by some superb finishes. He eventually went out to number 3 seed Wade losing 4–0 in the last 16. His results moved him to the brink of the top sixteen, ranking in 17th and having passed Roland Scholten on the PDC Order of Merit, Van der Voort was the second-highest ranked Dutchman in the rankings, behind Van Barneveld.

At the 2009 Grand Slam of Darts, Van der Voort suffered a defeat to Anastasia Dobromyslova in the group stages, becoming only the second man in history to lose a televised match to a woman. Two days later, however, he sensationally thrashed defending champion Phil Taylor 5–1, becoming only the third man in 2009 to beat Taylor in a televised match (the others being Mervyn King and James Wade).

=== 2010 ===
On 30 December 2010, Van der Voort's biggest win occurred in the round of 16 of the 2011 PDC World Darts Championship where he eliminated the 2010 runner-up and number four seed Simon Whitlock 4–2. However, in the quarter-finals on 1 January 2011, Van der Voort then lost 2–5 against Adrian Lewis.

=== 2011 ===
He reached the final in the first of the 2011 players championships in Germany, where he lost 6–1 to Mervyn King. He went on to win his first title of 2011, winning a UK Open Qualifier against Raymond Van Barneveld in a high scoring match.

=== 2012 ===
Van der Voort beat Mark Hylton 3–2 in the first round of the 2012 World Championship in a thrilling match. His second round tie also went to a deciding set against Andy Hamilton, but this time the Dutchman was on the wrong end and exited the tournament by 3 sets to 4. He then represented the Netherlands in the 2012 PDC World Cup of Darts to try to defend the title won by Raymond van Barneveld and Co Stompé in 2010. Van der Voort and Van Barneveld enjoyed comfortable victories over Austria and Northern Ireland to set up a semi-final clash with the Australian pair of Paul Nicholson and Simon Whitlock. Van Barneveld beat Nicholson 4–0 in their singles match, but this was the only point the Dutch won as they relinquished their crown in a 1–5 defeat. Van der Voort lost 7–9 in the last 32 of the UK Open to Kim Huybrechts, and at the World Matchplay he was defeated by Ian White 5–10 in the first round. He later revealed he had passed out before the match and returned home to Holland to undergo tests which revealed him to be lactose intolerant. Doctors advised him to miss the rest of 2012, however Van der Voort defied them to beat William O'Connor in the first round of the World Grand Prix in October. He then lost to Brendan Dolan 1–3 in sets in the last 16. After all 33 ProTour events of 2012 had been played, Van der Voort was 24th on the Order of Merit, inside the top 32 who qualified for the Players Championship Finals. He was beaten by Kim Huybrechts 3–6 in the first round.

=== 2013 ===
Van der Voort won his first round match at the World Championship 3–0 over former World Masters runner-up Stuart Kellett and then overcame Dean Winstanley 4–2, despite his opponent hitting a nine-dart finish in the third set. He then outscored James Wade in the last 16, but missed too many doubles including ones to win the second and third set and was beaten 0–4. He lost 5–3 in the first round of the UK Open to Kirk Shepherd and finished bottom of Group D at the Grand Slam of Darts having won one of his three games. Van der Voort reached the last 16 stage of four ProTour events during 2013 but lost on each occasion.

=== 2014 ===
He was involved in a high quality match against Adrian Lewis in the second round of the 2014 World Championship as Van der Voort averaged 99.47, but lost 4–1. He missed match darts in three successive legs against compatriot Christian Kist in the fourth round of the UK Open to be eliminated 9–8. In June, Van der Voort won the Austrian Darts Open by beating Jamie Caven 6–5. He was 5–2 down in the final, but took two successive legs and then levelled the match by taking out a 136 finish with Caven waiting on 80. In the deciding leg he was first to a finish, and he took out 83 on double 8 with a pressure last dart with Caven waiting on 56. It was Van der Voort's first title in three years. He lost in the first round of the World Matchplay and World Grand Prix 10–4 to Raymond van Barneveld and 2–0 (sets) to Michael van Gerwen respectively. Van der Voort recorded a 6–4 win against Simon Whitlock at the European Championship, before Van Barneveld knocked him out 10–7. He averaged 104.86 in whitewashing Andy Hamilton 6–0 in the opening round of the Players Championship Finals and then eliminated Peter Wright 10–5 and Dean Winstanley 10–8, after recovering from a 3–0 deficit, to reach his first major semi-final since 2008. He fell 10–3 down to Gary Anderson and, despite a rally to win four successive legs, was beaten 11–7. In the first round of the World Championship 2015 he beat the Scottish player John Henderson.

=== 2015 ===
Van der Voort took out a crucial 157 finish in the deciding set of his first round match at the 2015 World Championship, with his opponent John Henderson waiting on 80 to eliminate him. Van der Voort then won two 14 dart legs to beat him 3–2, before whitewashing teenager Max Hopp 4–0 and seeing off Dean Winstanley 4–2. Van der Voort came back from 2–0 down in the quarter-finals against Phil Taylor to lead 3–2. Taylor missed a multitude of set darts in the deciding leg of the next, but Van der Voort was unable to set up a shot at a double with six darts from 156 as Taylor levelled at 3–3. The final two sets both went to Taylor as he won 5–3. Van der Voort progressed through to the final of the second UK Open Qualifier, where he lost 6–1 to Michael van Gerwen. Despite averaging 101.03 in the fifth round of the UK Open, it was still over 10 points lower than Taylor's average, as Van der Voort was eliminated 9–3.

Van der Voort gained some revenge over Taylor in the first round of the World Grand Prix by defeating him 2–0 in sets in the first round and then beat Terry Jenkins 3–0 to reach the quarter-finals for the first time. He led Mensur Suljović 1–0, but missed 11 darts to win the next set which changed the whole match as he then lost nine consecutive legs to be knocked out 3–1. He lost in the first round of the European Championship 6–1 to Phil Taylor and 10–6 to Michael van Gerwen in the second round of the Players Championship Finals. 2015 did mark the first time that Van der Voort had reached two major quarter-finals in the same year.

=== 2016 ===
Van der Voort beat Laurence Ryder 3–0 in the first round of the 2016 World Championship and then came back from 2–0 down against Kyle Anderson to win 4–2. However, he could only win one leg against Gary Anderson in a 4–0 third round defeat. He had a high quality match with Phil Taylor in the fifth round of the UK Open as both players averaged over 100, but Van der Voort lost 9–7. He reached the semi-finals of the sixth Players Championship event and was defeated 6–4 by James Wade. This would prove to be Van der Voort's only last four appearance of 2016. His year tailed off after that as he was eliminated in the first round of the World Matchplay, failed to qualify for the World Grand Prix, European Championship and Grand Slam and lost in the second round of the Players Championship Finals.

=== 2017 ===
Van der Voort was beaten 3–1 by Max Hopp in the first round of the World Championship, and then suggested he might retire from darts due to a back injury that has been plaguing his performances in recent years.

=== 2018 ===
Van der Voort was beaten by Raymond van Barneveld in the third Round of the 2018 PDC World Darts Championship 4–1.

=== 2019 ===
He reached the third round of the World Championship again by beating Lourence Ilagan and Darren Webster before losing to Chris Dobey 3–4. His consistent results on the 2019 tour allowed him a spot at the 2019 World Matchplay, qualifying for Blackpool again after three years.

=== 2020 ===
Van der Voort exited the second round of the 2020 PDC World Darts Championship to Dave Chisnall 3–1. He made the Quarterfinals of the 2020 World Matchplay before losing to Glen Durrant 18–16. At one stage, Van der Voort threw an underarm dart whilst leading 12–9 during the match, which was disallowed. This lead him to accuse darts referee, Kirk Bevins, for believing he stepped over the oche, instead of acknowledging the underarm throw instead. Vincent would later apologise to Kirk for his terrible behaviour, after seeing the footage.

=== 2021 ===
Van der Voort had a solid run to the fourth round at the 2021 PDC World Darts Championship, with wins over Scott Waites and Nathan Aspinall, before losing to Daryl Gurney 4–2.

He would also reach the Quarterfinal stage of the 2021 Players Championship Finals, where he lost 10–3 to Jonny Clayton.

=== 2022 ===
After starting with a whitewash win over Adam Hunt in his opening match at the 2022 PDC World Darts Championship, Van der Voort was one of three players that had to withdraw from the tournament before their third round match, after testing positive for COVID-19.

=== 2023 ===
Van der Voort started his 2023 PDC World Darts Championship campaign with a 3–0 win over Cameron Menzies, before losing a close third round match to Luke Humphries 4–3.

Van der Voort entered the PDC Tour Card Holder Qualifiers in November to try to qualify for the 2024 PDC World Darts Championship, after falling outside of the top 32 on both the PDC Order of Merit and Pro Tour Order of Merit. He was eliminated in the last 32 to fellow Dutch player Jeffrey Sparidaans 6–2.

=== 2024 ===
Van der Voort was eliminated in the fifth round 10–6 of the UK Open to Dimitri Van den Bergh, who would go on to win the tournament.

Van der Voort didn't enter the PDC Tour Card Holder Qualifiers to try to qualify for the 2025 PDC World Darts Championship and lost his Tour Card as a result by finishing 69th on the PDC Order of Merit.

== Planned WSD career ==
After losing his Tour Card at the end of 2024, Van der Voort was invited to compete at the 2025 World Seniors Darts Championship, following a rule change that allowed players aged 45 or over to compete. He was due to face 2022 WDF World Champion, Neil Duff, in the first round. But he withdrew from the tournament for medical reasons.

Van der Voort was also drawn to face Steve Beaton at the 2025 World Seniors Matchplay come November. But the tournament was ultimately cancelled, after the WSD folded in August, meaning he was not given the chance to compete in any of the seniors darts events.

== World Championship results ==
=== BDO World Championship ===
- 2002: First round (lost to Mensur Suljović 2–3)
- 2003: Second round (lost to Tony David 1–3)
- 2004: First round (lost to Stephen Bunting 2–3)
- 2005: Quarter-finals (lost to Raymond van Barneveld 0–5)
- 2006: Second round (lost to Tony O'Shea 0–4)
- 2007: First round (lost to Davy Richardson 1–3)

=== PDC World Championship ===
- 2008: Second round (lost to Adrian Lewis 2–4)
- 2009: Third round (lost to James Wade 0–4)
- 2010: Second round (lost to Kevin Painter 3–4)
- 2011: Quarter-finals (lost to Adrian Lewis 2–5)
- 2012: Second round (lost to Andy Hamilton 3–4)
- 2013: Third round (lost to James Wade 0–4)
- 2014: Second round (lost to Adrian Lewis 1–4)
- 2015: Quarter-finals (lost to Phil Taylor 3–5)
- 2016: Third round (lost to Gary Anderson 0–4)
- 2017: First round (lost to Max Hopp 1–3)
- 2018: Third round (lost to Raymond van Barneveld 1–4)
- 2019: Third round (lost to Chris Dobey 3–4)
- 2020: Second round (lost to Dave Chisnall 1–3)
- 2021: Fourth round (lost to Daryl Gurney 2–4)
- 2022: Third round (withdrew – COVID-19)
- 2023: Third round (lost to Luke Humphries 3–4)

=== WSD ===
- 2025: First round (withdrew)

== Career finals ==
=== PDC major finals: 1 ===
Outcome	No.	Year	Championship	Opponent in the final	Score
Runner-up	1.	2007	UK Open	Raymond van Barneveld	8–16 (l)

== Performance timeline ==
Van der Voort's performance timeline is as follows:

=== BDO ===
Tournament	2001	2002	2003	2004	2005	2006	2007
World Championship	DNQ	1R	2R	1R	QF	2R	1R
International Darts League	Not held		RR	2R	RR	RR	RR
World Darts Trophy	NH	1R	2R	2R	2R	2R	1R
World Masters	1R	4R	4R	3R	3R	2R	PDC
Finder Darts Masters	RR	DNQ	RR	RR	RR	NH	PDC

=== PDC ===
Tournament	2007	2008	2009	2010	2011		2012	2013	2014	2015	2016	2017	2018	2019	2020	2021	2022	2023	2024
PDC Ranked televised events
World Championship	DNP	2R	3R	2R	QF		2R	3R	2R	QF	3R	1R	3R	3R	2R	4R	3R	3R	DNQ
UK Open	F	SF	3R	3R	3R		4R	2R	4R	5R	5R	5R	3R	3R	4R	4R	5R	4R	5R
World Matchplay	DNQ	1R	QF	2R	2R		1R	DNQ	1R	1R	1R	DNQ		1R	QF	1R	DNQ		
World Grand Prix	1R	1R	1R	1R	2R		2R	DNQ	1R	QF	DNQ			1R	DNQ	2R	DNQ		
European Championship	NH	1R	1R	1R	1R		1R	1R	2R	1R	DNQ	1R	DNQ	QF	DNQ		2R	DNQ	
Grand Slam (Note: A non-ranked event until 2015)	RR	RR	RR	RR	RR		DNQ	RR	RR	Did not qualify									
Players Championship Finals	Not held		2R	1R	1R	1R	1R	DNQ	SF	2R	2R	1R	1R	2R	2R	QF	1R	DNQ	
PDC Non-ranked televised events
Masters	Not held							DNQ			QF	Did not qualify							
World Cup	Not held			DNQ	NH		SF	Did not qualify											
World Series Finals	Not held								Did not qualify						2R	2R	1R	DNQ	
PDC Past major events
Las Vegas Desert Classic	1R	DNQ	1R	Not held															
Championship League	NH	RR	RR	RR	RR		DNP		Not held										
Year-end ranking	25	19	16	18	14		21	29	23	15	25	34	36	33	28	28	30	53	69

==== European Tour ====
Season	1	2	3	4	5	6	7	8	9	10	11	12	13
2012	ADO; 2R	GDC; 2R	EDO; 2R	GDM; QF	DDM; 2R								
2013	UKM; 1R	EDT; 1R	EDO; DNQ	ADO; 1R	GDT; 1R	GDC; 3R	GDM; 3R	DDM; 1R					
2014	GDC; DNQ	DDM; QF	GDM; QF	ADO; W	GDT; 1R	EDO; DNQ	EDG; 3R	EDT; 3R					
2015	GDC; QF	GDT; 3R	GDM; 3R	DDM; 2R	IDO; 2R	EDO; QF	EDT; 2R	EDM; QF	EDG; 2R				
2016	DDM; DNQ	GDM; DNQ	GDT; DNQ	EDM; 3R	ADO; 1R	EDO; DNQ	IDO; DNQ	EDT; 2R	EDG; DNQ	GDC; 1R			
2017	GDC; DNQ	GDM; DNQ	GDO; 2R	EDG; DNQ	GDT; DNQ	EDM; 3R	ADO; 2R	EDO; 2R	DDM; DNQ	GDG; QF	IDO; 1R	EDT; 3R	
2018	EDO; 1R	GDG; DNQ	GDO; DNQ	ADO; DNQ	EDG; 2R	DDM; DNQ	GDT; 2R	DDO; DNQ	EDM; 1R	GDC; 1R	DDC; 1R	IDO; 1R	EDT; 2R
2019	EDO; 2R	GDC; DNQ	GDG; DNQ	GDO; DNQ	ADO; DNQ	EDG; 2R	DDM; QF	DDO; 1R	CDO; DNQ	ADC; SF	EDM; DNQ	IDO; DNQ	GDT; DNQ
2020	BDC; DNQ	GDC; DNQ	EDG; 3R	IDO; DNQ									
2021	HDT; 1R	GDT; DNQ											
2022	IDO; 2R	GDC; 2R	GDG; 1R	ADO; DNQ	EDO; DNQ	CDO; SF	EDG; DNQ	DDC; 1R	EDM; DNQ	HDT; DNQ	GDO; DNQ	BDO; 1R	GDT; 1R
2023	BSD; DNQ	EDO; DNQ	IDO; DNQ	GDG; 1R	ADO; DNQ	DDC; DNQ	BDO; DNQ	CDO; 2R	EDG; DNQ	EDM; DNP	GDO; DNQ	HDT; DNQ	GDC; 1R

==== Players Championships ====
Season	1	2	3	4	5	6	7	8	9	10	11	12	13	14	15	16	17	18	19	20	21	22	23	24	25	26	27	28	29	30
2012	ALI; 3R	ALI; 4R	REA; 1R	REA; 1R	CRA; 3R	CRA; 2R	BIR; 1R	BIR; 2R	CRA; 4R	CRA; 2R	BAR; 3R	BAR; 2R	DUB; 3R	DUB; 3R	KIL; 3R	KIL; 1R	CRA; 1R	CRA; 1R	BAR; 1R	BAR; 3R										
2013	WIG; 2R	WIG; 3R	WIG; 4R	WIG; 1R	CRA; 2R	CRA; 3R	BAR; 3R	BAR; 1R	DUB; 2R	DUB; 3R	KIL; 3R	KIL; 3R	WIG; 4R	WIG; 1R	BAR; 3R	BAR; 2R														
2014	BAR; 2R	BAR; 3R	CRA; 1R	CRA; 4R	WIG; 3R	WIG; QF	WIG; 3R	WIG; 1R	CRA; 2R	CRA; 2R	COV; 1R	COV; 2R	CRA; 4R	CRA; 3R	DUB; 1R	DUB; 3R	CRA; 4R	CRA; QF	COV; 4R	COV; 4R										
2015	BAR; 1R	BAR; 3R	BAR; 4R	BAR; 2R	BAR; 3R	COV; 2R	COV; 2R	COV; 3R	CRA; QF	CRA; 1R	BAR; 2R	BAR; 3R	WIG; 4R	WIG; 3R	BAR; 1R	BAR; 2R	DUB; 4R	DUB; 2R	COV; 3R	COV; 3R										
2016	BAR; 1R	BAR; 1R	BAR; 1R	BAR; 1R	BAR; DNP	BAR; SF	BAR; 3R	COV; 2R	COV; 1R	BAR; 2R	BAR; 4R	BAR; 2R	BAR; QF	BAR; 4R	BAR; 4R	BAR; 2R	DUB; 1R	DUB; 2R	BAR; 4R	BAR; 2R										
2017	BAR; 1R	BAR; 2R	BAR; 1R	BAR; 1R	MIL; 2R	MIL; 2R	BAR; 2R	BAR; 2R	WIG; 1R	WIG; 2R	MIL; 3R	MIL; 2R	WIG; 3R	WIG; QF	BAR; 1R	BAR; 2R	BAR; 2R	BAR; 3R	DUB; QF	DUB; QF	BAR; 2R	BAR; 3R								
2018	BAR; 1R	BAR; 1R	BAR; 1R	BAR; 1R	MIL; 1R	MIL; 2R	BAR; 2R	BAR; 2R	WIG; 2R	WIG; 2R	MIL; 3R	MIL; 1R	WIG; 4R	WIG; 2R	BAR; 1R	BAR; 3R	BAR; 3R	BAR; 3R	DUB; 1R	DUB; 1R	BAR; 4R	BAR; 2R								
2019	WIG; 2R	WIG; 3R	WIG; 2R	WIG; 3R	BAR; 1R	BAR; 1R	WIG; QF	WIG; QF	BAR; 3R	BAR; 3R	BAR; 3R	BAR; 1R	BAR; 3R	BAR; 3R	BAR; 2R	BAR; 4R	WIG; 2R	WIG; 3R	BAR; QF	BAR; 1R	HIL; 3R	HIL; 3R	BAR; 4R	BAR; 2R	BAR; 2R	BAR; 1R	DUB; 4R	DUB; 1R	BAR; 2R	BAR; 1R
2020	BAR; 1R	BAR; 1R	WIG; 4R	WIG; 3R	WIG; 4R	WIG; 2R	BAR; 4R	BAR; 1R	MIL; 3R	MIL; 2R	MIL; 3R	MIL; 1R	MIL; 1R	NIE; 4R	NIE; 2R	NIE; 3R	NIE; 2R	NIE; 2R	COV; QF	COV; SF	COV; 4R	COV; 1R	COV; 2R							
2021	BOL; 3R	BOL; SF	BOL; 1R	BOL; 2R	MIL; 3R	MIL; 3R	MIL; QF	MIL; 1R	NIE; 1R	NIE; 1R	NIE; 1R	NIE; 2R	MIL; 2R	MIL; 3R	MIL; 4R	MIL; 4R	COV; 4R	COV; 4R	COV; 1R	COV; 2R	BAR; 2R	BAR; QF	BAR; 1R	BAR; 3R	BAR; 2R	BAR; QF	BAR; 4R	BAR; 1R	BAR; 1R	BAR; 1R
2022	BAR; 1R	BAR; 1R	WIG; 3R	WIG; 3R	BAR; 1R	BAR; 1R	NIE; 3R	NIE; 1R	BAR; 2R	BAR; 1R	BAR; QF	BAR; 3R	BAR; 1R	WIG; 1R	WIG; 2R	NIE; 3R	NIE; 2R	BAR; 1R	BAR; 3R	BAR; 2R	BAR; 4R	BAR; 3R	BAR; 1R	BAR; 4R	BAR; 1R	BAR; 2R	BAR; 2R	BAR; 3R	BAR; 1R	BAR; 1R
2023	BAR; 2R	BAR; 1R	BAR; 1R	BAR; 1R	BAR; 1R	BAR; 4R	HIL; 1R	HIL; 2R	WIG; 1R	WIG; 2R	LEI; 3R	LEI; 1R	HIL; 1R	HIL; 1R	LEI; 1R	LEI; 4R	HIL; 1R	HIL; 2R	BAR; 1R	BAR; 1R	BAR; 2R	BAR; 1R	BAR; 1R	BAR; 2R	BAR; 1R	BAR; 2R	BAR; 2R	BAR; 2R	BAR; 1R	BAR; 1R
2024	WIG; 2R	WIG; 1R	LEI; 2R	LEI; 1R	HIL; 1R	HIL; 3R	LEI; 1R	LEI; 1R	HIL; 1R	HIL; 2R	HIL; 2R	HIL; 2R	MIL; 2R	MIL; 1R	MIL; 2R	MIL; 1R	MIL; 1R	MIL; 1R	MIL; 2R	WIG; 2R	WIG; 1R	MIL; 1R	MIL; 2R	WIG; 1R	WIG; 1R	WIG; 1R	WIG; DNP	WIG; 1R	LEI; 2R	LEI; 3R

Performance Table Legend
W	Won the tournament	F	Finalist	SF	Semifinalist	QF	Quarterfinalist	#R; RR; Prel.	Lost in # round Round-robin; Preliminary round	DQ	Disqualified
DNQ	Did not qualify	DNP	Did not participate	WD	Withdrew	NH	Tournament not held	#R; RR; Prel.	Lost in # round Round-robin; Preliminary round	NYF	Not yet founded
