= Ted Hankey =

English darts player

Personal information
- Full name: Edward Hankey
- Nickname: "The Count"
- Born: 20 February 1968 (age 58) Stoke-on-Trent, England

Sport
- Sport: Darts
- Playing since: 1977
- Darts: 13g Signature
- Laterality: Right-handed
- Walk-on music: "Be on Your Way" by DJ Zany

Organisation (see split in darts)
- BDO: 1996–2012, 2014–2020
- PDC: 2009–2011, 2012–2013
- WDF: 2014–2020

WDF major events – best performances
- World Championship: Winner (2): 2000, 2009
- World Masters: Semi-final: 1997, 2003, 2004
- World Trophy: Quarter-final: 2004
- Int. Darts League: Quarter-final: 2003, 2004, 2006
- Finder Masters: Runner-up: 2004
- Dutch Open: Winner (2): 1999, 2003

PDC premier events – best performances
- UK Open: Last 64: 2013
- Grand Slam: Quarter-final: 2011, 2013

Other tournament wins
- Years
BDO Gold Cup	1999
Belgium Open	2002
British Open	2010
Denmark Open	2003
England Open	2003, 2007, 2009
German Open	2002, 2003
IDPA Lakeside Classic	2008
Isle of Man Open	2011
Malta Open	1995, 1996
Norway Open	2004

Edward Hankey (born 20 February 1968) is an English former professional darts player and winner of two BDO World Darts Championships. He was convicted of sexual assault in 2022.

Nicknamed "the Count", he won the BDO World Darts Championship in 2000 and 2009 and was runner-up in 2001. He moved to the Professional Darts Corporation (PDC) in 2012 but suffered a mini-stroke while playing Michael van Gerwen at the 2012 Grand Slam of Darts and took three months away from the sport to recuperate. He lost his PDC tour card in 2014, when he was 94th on the PDC Order of Merit, and returned to the BDO, where he failed to impress in the latter years of his playing career. He made his last appearance at the BDO World Darts Championship in 2016, losing 3–0 in the first round.

Hankey struggled financially in his later career and was declared bankrupt in 2018. In September 2021, he sexually assaulted a girl who was aged over 16 but under 18 at the time. After pleading guilty, he was sentenced in May 2022 to two years in prison and placed on the sex offender registry for ten years.

== Darts career ==
=== BDO career ===
In the 2000 BDO World Darts Championship, after beating Bob Taylor, Steve Douglas, Kevin Painter and Chris Mason, Hankey whitewashed Ronnie Baxter 6–0 in the final, winning the match with a spectacular 170 checkout – the highest three-dart finish achievable. The final lasted only 46 minutes, the shortest in the tournament's history. In the semi-final v Chris Mason, he scored a championship record 22 x 180s in a match. (The next highest are 15 and 14, which he also holds, in matches v Tony O'Shea in the final and Martin Adams in the semi-finals respectively, both in 2009.) He also scored a record 48 x 180s during the 2000 tournament. Hankey reached the final again in 2001, but lost to John Walton 6–2. After this Hankey went through a fairly barren spell at the Lakeside and did not reach another major final or World Championship semi-final until his victory in the 2009 BDO World Championships.

In 2002, he was knocked out in the second round by Wayne Jones and suffered a first round exit in 2003 to 'Silverback' Tony O'Shea. Ranked number two for the 2004 tournament, he was defeated in the quarter-finals, again losing to O'Shea 5–1. Hankey again reached the quarter-finals in 2005, this time falling to England captain Martin Adams 5–3, despite at one stage in the contest having led by 3–1 in sets. In the 2006 tournament, Hankey had an uncharacteristic "bad day at the office", crashing out at the first hurdle to Dutchman Albertino Essers.

Seeded eighth for the 2007 BDO World Darts Championship, he defeated Mario Robbe of the Netherlands by 3–0 in the opening round. He then hit another 170 checkout in his tight 4–3 victory over qualifier Davy Richardson, before losing to Adams, again by 5–3. Despite this setback, Hankey remained positive and upbeat about his darts future after the game. He achieved the 9-Darter in the Scottish open 2011.

Hankey won his first round match of the 2008 BDO World Championship over Steve West 3–2. as he defeated Andy Boulton in the second round. He then lost in the quarter-finals to Australian Simon Whitlock 0–5.

However, controversy continued to follow Hankey during the BDO International Open (formerly the England Open) on 15 June 2008. During a quarter-final match with former PDC player Robbie Green, Hankey went on to lose the match 2–1 in sets in the deciding leg.

==== Second world title and final seasons ====
Hankey began the 2009 Lakeside Championships with a first round victory over close friend Brian Woods with a scoreline of 3–0. He then went on to win the Championship, beating his problems with "oche rage" as well as opponents such as former World Champion Walton and England darts team captain Adams, winning the final 7–6 in sets against O'Shea. Hankey led 4–2 at the interval, but missed several darts to win the match at 6–5, but he finally closed out the match 3–1 in the final set.

=== PDC career ===
As a result of his world title win, Hankey was invited to the 2009 Grand Slam of Darts, which is organised by the PDC. He accepted the invitation and was drawn in group E with Scott Waites, Wayne Mardle and Simon Whitlock. He lost his opening group game 3–5 to Waites, but went on to win against Wayne Mardle, and was defeated by Simon Whitlock 5–4.

In the 2010 BDO World Darts Championship Hankey beat Gary Robson 3–0 and Willy van de Wiel 4–1 before being knocked out of the competition in the quarter-final by Dave Chisnall with a scoreline of 5–4 on sets, despite at one point leading 4–1.

In the 2010 Grand Slam of Darts he defeated Phil Taylor 5–4 in the group stages, giving him 2 wins out of 2. He then went on to defeat Michael van Gerwen, also 5–4, to proceed to the knockout stage of the competition. Hankey was knocked out of the competition by Steve Beaton in the first knockout stage. He won the Isle of Man open but was unable to follow that up. Although he did get to the semi-finals of the English Open.

Hankey qualified for the 2011 Grand Slam of Darts. He managed to win 2 of his 3 group matches to qualify for the last 16. He played Michael van Gerwen winning the match by 10 legs to 9 before losing narrowly against Mark Walsh 14–16, after making a comeback from a 9–15 deficit.

In the 2012 BDO World Darts Championship, Hankey defeated newcomer Clive Barden 3–2 in sets, then the man who knocked him out of the previous year's tournament, Scott Waites 4–3 to qualify for the quarter-final. In the quarter-final, Hankey defeated Martin Atkins 5–1. In the semi-final, Hankey led against débutant and eventual champion Christian Kist 5–3 and had a dart at bullseye to win 6–4, but Kist recovered to win the match 6–5. After the match Hankey announced he did not plan on returning to Lakeside the following year and would instead join the BDO's rival organisation, the Professional Darts Corporation (PDC). Hankey also controversially suggested that the air conditioning was deliberately turned on when he was throwing for the match in the tenth set so as to prevent him from leaving the BDO as World Champion.

=== Return to PDC ===
The day after Hankey's announcement that he was leaving the BDO, the PDC announced on its website that it was offering two-year tour cards to the 2012 BDO World Darts Championship semi-finalists. This meant that Hankey automatically received a tour card to play in the PDC and its Pro Tour, rather than having to play through the qualifying school tournament (usually a requirement to all new PDC players). His first event on the tour was the opening Players Championship of 2012, The Spanish Darts Trophy, where he lost 4–6 to Matthew Edgar in the preliminary round. Hankey then won his first matches in the PDC by defeating Steve West 6–5 and Toon Greebe 6–1 in the first UK Open qualifier in Crawley, before losing 6–4 to Connie Finnan. In May, Hankey had his best finish on the tour to date, reaching the last 16 of the Players Championship Event 5, losing 1–6 to Raymond van Barneveld. In his first major event on the tour, the UK Open, Hankey beat qualifier Danny Dutson 4–0 and Andy Jenkins 4–1, but then lost to his old BDO rival Mervyn King 1–4 in the second round.

==== Health concerns ====
Hankey was drawn in Group B of the 2012 Grand Slam of Darts with Michael van Gerwen, Robert Thornton and Steve Beaton. He was whitewashed 0–5 by Thornton but defeated Beaton 5–3 to stay alive in the group. However, requiring a 5–0 or 5–1 victory over Van Gerwen in his last game to have a chance of progressing, Hankey visibly struggled with a three-dart average of 59, missing five successive shots at a single in the first leg (including two that missed the board completely) to set up a double. Hankey was then seen rubbing his left eye repeatedly and losing his balance, and Van Gerwen eventually won the match 5–0 with a 90 average. Two days later it was revealed that Hankey had suffered a transient ischemic attack, had very high cholesterol and diabetes and needed six to eight weeks' rest, which ruled him out of the qualifier for the 2013 World Championship.

==== Return to the oche ====
Hankey returned to competitive darts for the first time in three months in February 2013, in an attempt to qualify for the first European Tour event of the year, the UK Darts Masters. He beat Wayne Atwood in the last 96, before losing 3–6 to Keith Rooney. He produced encouraging displays at the second Players Championship by beating John Henderson 6–3, world number 15 Paul Nicholson 6–5 and world number four James Wade 6–1 to reach the fourth round. Hankey faced Dennis Smith and lost 5–6, missing one dart for the match in the deciding leg to play in his first PDC quarter-final. Hankey qualified for the UK Open and beat Bernd Roith and Dave Weston before seeing a 3–1 lead turn into a 4–9 defeat in the third round to John Part. He qualified for his first European Tour event in July but was forced to withdraw from it in September due to whiplash injuries suffered in a minor car crash.

He returned for the Grand Slam of Darts and lost 5–3 in his opening group game to Scott Waites. However, Hankey produced a superb performance in his next game against Dave Chisnall as from 3–3 he hit a 170 finish and then scored 177 in the next leg to set up 32 and a 5–3 win. He then defeated 2013 World Youth champion Michael Smith 5–1 in his final game to progress to the knock-out stages, where he faced Simon Whitlock. Hankey made a remarkable fightback from 6–1 down to win 10–9 and reach the quarter-finals of the event for the second time in his career. He played Waites once again and his run came to an end with a 16–10 defeat.

=== Return to the BDO ===
Hankey's two-year tour card expired after the 2014 World Championship and with him being ranked world number 94, well outside the top 64 who retain their professional status, he lost his position in the PDC. He registered to Q School, but withdrew from the event before it began. It was announced soon after that Hankey had decided to end his unsuccessful stay in the PDC and would return to the BDO. In his first season back in the BDO, his best results were two quarter finals as he narrowly failed to automatically qualify for the Lakeside, being ranked 29 in the BDO (top 28 qualified). He also failed to qualify for the Masters, Lakeside and the World Trophy in the qualifying tournaments held in Hull. In 2015 he qualified for the 2015 BDO World Trophy but was beaten in the first round by Sam Hewson 6–4.

== Personal life ==
Hankey has three children. Following a stroke in 2012, his earnings from tournaments declined and he was declared bankrupt in June 2018. As of May 2022, he and his wife were in the process of divorcing.

=== Conviction for sexual assault ===
In March 2022, Hankey was charged with sexual assault; the prosecution said his female victim was over 16 but under the age of 18. The incident took place in September 2021 and was captured on film. He pleaded guilty to the charge on 14 April 2022 and was released on conditional bail. On 12 May 2022 at Chester Crown Court, he was sentenced to two years in prison and placed on the sex offender registry for ten years.

== Career finals ==
=== BDO major finals: 4 (2 titles) ===
Legend
World Championship (2–1)
Zuiderduin Masters (0–1)

Outcome	No.	Year	Championship	Opponent in the final	Score (Note: (l) = score in legs, (s) = score in sets.)
Winner	1.	2000	World Championship	(England) Ronnie Baxter	6–0 (s)
Runner-up	1.	2001	World Championship	(England) John Walton	2–6 (s)
Runner-up	2.	2004	Zuiderduin Masters	(Netherlands) Raymond van Barneveld	1–5 (s)
Winner	2.	2009	World Championship	(England) Tony O'Shea	7–6 (s)

== World Championship results ==
=== BDO ===
- 1998: Quarter-finals (lost to Colin Monk 2–5)
- 1999: Second round (lost to Chris Mason 1–3)
- 2000: Winner (beat Ronnie Baxter 6–0)
- 2001: Runner-up (lost to John Walton 2–6)
- 2002: Second round (lost to Wayne Jones 2–3)
- 2003: First round (lost to Tony O'Shea 2–3)
- 2004: Quarter-finals (lost to Tony O'Shea 1–5)
- 2005: Quarter-finals (lost to Martin Adams 3–5)
- 2006: First round (lost to Albertino Essers 1–3)
- 2007: Quarter-finals (lost to Martin Adams 3–5)
- 2008: Quarter-finals (lost to Simon Whitlock 0–5)
- 2009: Winner (beat Tony O'Shea 7–6)
- 2010: Quarter-finals (lost to Dave Chisnall 4–5)
- 2011: First round (lost to Scott Waites 0–3)
- 2012: Semi-finals (lost to Christian Kist 5–6)
- 2016: First round (lost to Martin Phillips 0–3)

== Performance timeline ==
Tournament	1995	1996	1997	1998	1999	2000	2001	2002	2003	2004	2005	2006	2007	2008	2009	2010	2011	2012	2013	2014	2015	2016	2017	2018
BDO World Championship	DNQ			QF	2R	W	F	2R	1R	QF	QF	1R	QF	QF	W	QF	1R	SF	DNP			1R	DNQ	
BDO World Trophy	Not held																			DNQ	1R	1R	DNQ	
International Darts League	Not held								QF	QF	2R	QF	DNP	Not held										
World Darts Trophy	Not held							2R	1R	QF	2R	1R	DNP	Not held										
Winmau World Masters	2R	3R	SF	4R	2R	2R	3R	4R	SF	SF	4R	4R	QF	6R	6R	QF	2R	DNP		4R	3R	4R	4R	1R
Finder Darts Masters	Not held					RR	QF	QF	QF	F	SF	NH	RR	RR	RR	QF	DNP			RR	DNP			
UK Open	Not held								DNP									2R	3R	DNP				
Grand Slam of Darts	Not held												DNQ		RR	2R	QF	RR	QF	DNQ				

Performance Table Legend
W	Won the tournament	F	Finalist	SF	Semifinalist	QF	Quarterfinalist	#R; RR; Prel.	Lost in # round Round-robin; Preliminary round	DQ	Disqualified
DNQ	Did not qualify	DNP	Did not participate	WD	Withdrew	NH	Tournament not held	#R; RR; Prel.	Lost in # round Round-robin; Preliminary round	NYF	Not yet founded
