= 2024 PDC Pro Tour =

Darts tournament series

Final 2024 PDC Pro Tour Order of Merit Prize money in the tables is in thousands £
Rank	Player	Prize money
1	Dave Chisnall	164.5
2	Luke Littler	162.5
3	Luke Humphries	151.5
4	Stephen Bunting	148
5	Ryan Searle	144
6	Michael van Gerwen	141
7	Josh Rock	140
8	Chris Dobey	138.5
9	Martin Schindler	138
10	Ross Smith	124
11	Danny Noppert	123.5
12	Damon Heta	122
13	Gary Anderson	107.5
14	Jonny Clayton	107
15	Daryl Gurney	97
16	Gian van Veen	95

The 2024 PDC Pro Tour was a series of non-televised darts tournaments organised by the Professional Darts Corporation (PDC). Players Championships and European Tour events are the events that make up the Pro Tour. There were thirty Players Championship events, thirteen PDC European Tour events, 24 events for the Challenge and Development Tours, as well as the Women's Series.

Dave Chisnall topped the 2024 Pro Tour Order of Merit, with Luke Littler, Luke Humphries, Stephen Bunting and Ryan Searle completing the top five.

== Prize money ==
This is how the prize money was divided:

Stage	ET	PC	CT/DT	WS
Winner	£30,000	£15,000	£2,500	£2,000
Runner-up	£12,000	£10,000	£1,000	£1,000
Semi-finalists	£8,500	£5,000	£750	£500
Quarter-finalists	£6,000	£3,500	£500	£300
Last 16	£4,000	£2,500	£300	£200
Last 32	£2,500	£1,500	£200	£100
Last 48	£1,250	N/A	N/A	N/A
Last 64	N/A	£1,000	£75	£50 (Note: Last 64 prize money will only be paid out, if a minimum of 128 participants take part in a Women's Series event.)
Total	£175,000	£125,000	£15,000	£10,000

== PDC Tour Card ==
128 players were granted Tour Cards, which enabled them to participate in all Players Championships events, the UK Open and qualifiers for all European Tour and select televised events.

=== Tour cards ===
The 2024 Tour Cards were awarded to:

- (64) The top 64 players from the PDC Order of Merit after the 2024 World Championship.
- (25) 25 qualifiers from 2023 Q-School not ranked in the top 64 of the PDC Order of Merit following the World Championship.
  - Corey Cadby's Tour Card was removed as he had not competed in any events during the 12 months since the previous Q-School.
- (2) Two highest qualifiers from 2022 Challenge Tour (Robert Owen and Danny van Trijp).
- (2) Two highest qualifiers from 2022 Development Tour (Geert Nentjes and Jurjen van der Velde).
- (2) Two highest qualifiers from 2023 Challenge Tour (Berry van Peer and Owen Bates).
- (2) Two highest qualifiers from 2023 Development Tour (Wessel Nijman and Nathan Rafferty).
- (8) The daily winners from the 2024 Q-Schools.

Afterwards, the playing field was complemented by the highest qualified players from the final stage Q-School Order of Merit until the maximum number of 128 Pro Tour Card players was reached. In 2024, that meant a total of 23 additional players qualified this way.

=== Q-School ===
The PDC Pro Tour Qualifying School (or Q-School) was split into a UK and European Q-School. Players that are not from Europe could choose which Q-School to compete in.

Stage One took place between 8–10 January; with the Final Stage being held between 11 and 14 January. The winner of each day's play in the Final Stage will be given a PDC Tour Card.

The UK Q-School was held at Arena MK, Milton Keynes, England; with the European Q-School held at Wunderland Kalkar in Kalkar, Germany.

UK Q-School
January 11	January 12	January 13	January 14
Steve Lennon (IRL)	Robert Grundy (ENG)	Leighton Bennett (ENG)	Dom Taylor (ENG)
127 players	126 players	124 players	119 players
European Q-School
January 11	January 12	January 13	January 14
Martijn Dragt (NED)	Jelle Klaasen (NED)	Andy Baetens (BEL)	Jeffrey de Graaf (SWE)
127 players	124 players	119 players	105 players

An Order of Merit was created for each Q School. For every win after the Last 64, the players were awarded 1 point. The top ten from the UK rankings and top thirteen from the Europe rankings, excluding those who won their cards outright, won a Tour Card.

The following players picked up Tour Cards as a result:

UK Q-School Order of Merit

1. Matthew Dennant (ENG)
2. William Borland (SCO)
3. Joshua Richardson (ENG)
4. James Hurrell (ENG)
5. George Killington (ENG)
6. Danny Lauby (USA)
7. Rhys Griffin (WAL)
8. Brett Claydon (ENG)
9. Darren Beveridge (SCO)
10. Adam Hunt (ENG)

European Q-School Order of Merit

1. Haupai Puha (NZL)
2. Jules van Dongen (USA)
3. Radek Szagański (POL)
4. Chris Landman (NED)
5. Patrick Geeraets (NED)
6. Jitse van der Wal (NED)
7. Paul Krohne (GER)
8. Benjamin Drue Reus (DEN)
9. Mario Vandenbogaerde (BEL)
10. Lukas Wenig (GER)
11. Thibault Tricole (FRA)
12. Michele Turetta (ITA)
13. Tim Wolters (GER)

== Players Championships ==
There were 30 Players Championship events in 2024. The top 64 players from the Players Championships Order of Merit qualified for the 2024 Players Championship Finals, which was solely based on prize money won in the 30 Players Championship events during the season.

No.	Date	Location	Winner	Legs	Runner-up	Ref.
1	12 February	Wigan	Luke Littler (109.64)	8 – 7	Ryan Searle (111.71)	
2	13 February	Wigan	Gary Anderson (101.14)	8 – 5	Ryan Searle (91.33)	
3	19 February	Leicester	Ryan Searle (107.63)	8 – 7	Gary Anderson (108.61)	
4	20 February	Leicester	Damon Heta (103.37)	8 – 4	Chris Dobey (106.44)	
5	18 March	Hildesheim	Raymond van Barneveld (95.28)	8 – 1	Stephen Bunting (93.89)	
6	19 March	Hildesheim	Dave Chisnall (90.07)	8 – 6	Dirk van Duijvenbode (91.47)	
7	8 April	Leicester	Chris Dobey (99.52)	8 – 4	Josh Rock (97.18)	
8	9 April	Leicester	Danny Noppert (95.59)	8 – 6	Luke Humphries (95.70)	
9	6 May	Hildesheim	Michael Smith (88.39)	8 – 6	Ryan Joyce (92.09)	
10	7 May	Hildesheim	Brendan Dolan (98.14)	8 – 4	Jeffrey de Graaf (88.50)	
11	11 June	Hildesheim	Alan Soutar (93.63)	8 – 7	Daryl Gurney (85.38)	
12	12 June	Hildesheim	Dimitri Van den Bergh (87.42)	8 – 3	Matt Campbell (87.31)	
13	2 July	Milton Keynes	Ross Smith (107.35)	8 – 7	Wesley Plaisier (104.79)	
14	3 July	Milton Keynes	Jonny Clayton (106.05)	8 – 5	Wesley Plaisier (100.36)	
15	31 July	Milton Keynes	Luke Littler (99.66)	8 – 6	Wessel Nijman (91.61)	
16	1 August	Milton Keynes	Mike De Decker (104.87)	8 – 2	Ricky Evans (94.10)	
17	2 August	Milton Keynes	Josh Rock (95.63)	8 – 6	Joe Cullen (92.25)	
18	21 August	Milton Keynes	Damon Heta (106.80)	8 – 3	Ryan Searle (97.30)	
19	22 August	Milton Keynes	Chris Dobey (100.47)	8 – 6	Cameron Menzies (100.09)	
20	17 September	Wigan	Luke Littler (99.28)	8 – 7	Stephen Bunting (99.03)	
21	18 September	Wigan	Michael van Gerwen (106.67)	8 – 4	Dave Chisnall (100.63)	
22	24 September	Leicester	Gary Anderson (90.81)	8 – 4	Connor Scutt (92.85)	
23	25 September	Leicester	Dave Chisnall (92.95)	8 – 4	Chris Dobey (96.29)	
24	1 October	Wigan	Wessel Nijman (99.63)	8 – 5	Stephen Bunting (101.11)	
25	2 October	Wigan	Chris Dobey (98.16)	8 – 3	Stephen Bunting (96.35)	
26	3 October	Wigan	Luke Humphries (93.84)	8 – 7	Stephen Bunting (96.92)	
27	15 October	Wigan	Michael van Gerwen (95.52)	8 – 4	Gerwyn Price (93.47)	
28	16 October	Wigan	Wesley Plaisier (92.24)	8 – 7	Josh Rock (92.66)	
29	30 October	Leicester	Cameron Menzies (93.84)	8 – 4	Stephen Bunting (94.30)	
30	31 October	Leicester	Josh Rock (102.49)	8 – 7	Jonny Clayton (106.38)	

== PDC European Tour ==
There were 13 European Tour events in 2024.

No.	Date	Event	Location	Winner	Legs	Runner-up	Ref.
1	8–10 March	Belgian Darts Open	Wieze	Luke Littler (103.76)	8 – 7	Rob Cross (108.00)	
2	30 March–1 April	German Darts Grand Prix	Munich	Luke Humphries (112.66)	8 – 1	Michael van Gerwen (96.80)	
3	12–14 April	International Darts Open	Riesa	Martin Schindler (96.35)	8 – 5	Gerwyn Price (101.62)	
4	19–21 April	European Darts Grand Prix	Sindelfingen	Gary Anderson (90.76)	8 – 6	Ross Smith (90.88)	
5	26–28 April	Austrian Darts Open	Graz	Luke Littler (102.71)	8 – 4	Joe Cullen (85.54)	
6	10–12 May	Baltic Sea Darts Open	Kiel	Rob Cross (105.56)	8 – 6	Luke Humphries (104.38)	
7	24–26 May	Dutch Darts Championship	Rosmalen	Josh Rock (89.89)	8 – 4	Jonny Clayton (90.59)	
8	21–23 June	European Darts Open	Leverkusen	Dave Chisnall (89.67)	8 – 6	Ross Smith (93.82)	
9	30 August–1 September	German Darts Championship	Hildesheim	Peter Wright (96.62)	8 – 5	Luke Littler (106.87)	
10	6–8 September	Flanders Darts Trophy	Antwerp	Dave Chisnall (96.90)	8 – 6	Ricardo Pietreczko (95.23)	
11	20–22 September	Hungarian Darts Trophy	Budapest	Michael van Gerwen (97.90)	8 – 7	Gian van Veen (94.81)	
12	27–29 September	Swiss Darts Trophy	Basel	Martin Schindler (93.03)	8 – 7	Ryan Searle (93.68)	
13	18–20 October	Czech Darts Open	Prague	Luke Humphries (105.57)	8 – 1	Kim Huybrechts (86.14)	

== PDC Challenge Tour ==
The Challenge Tour once again consisted of 4 weekends of 5 events, and 1 weekend of 4 events. The top 2 not yet qualified players on the Order of Merit received a PDC Tour Card and a place at the 2025 PDC World Darts Championship, while the winner of the Order of Merit received a spot at the 2024 Grand Slam of Darts as well. The Challenge Tour rankings were additionally used to top up Players Championship events when not all 128 Tour Card holders entered. Furthermore, the eight highest ranked players from the 2024 Challenge Tour without a tour card for the 2025 season qualified for the preliminary round group stage of the 2025 PDC World Masters, and first round of the 2025 UK Open.

No.	Date	Location	Winner	Legs	Runner-up	Ref.
1	19 January	Milton Keynes	Richie Burnett (89.50)	5 – 4	Darryl Pilgrim (96.86)	
2	19 January	Milton Keynes	Danny Jansen (96.37)	5 – 3	Darryl Pilgrim (97.96)	
3	20 January	Milton Keynes	Oskar Lukasiak (81.98)	5 – 3	Danny Jansen (86.95)	
4	20 January	Milton Keynes	Stefan Bellmont (86.38)	5 – 0	Pál Székely (75.31)	
5	21 January	Milton Keynes	Aden Kirk (85.67)	5 – 3	Danny Jansen (87.43)	
6	15 March	Hildesheim	Noa-Lynn van Leuven (100.97)	5 – 3	Tytus Kanik (88.18)	
7	15 March	Hildesheim	René Eidams (87.99)	5 – 4	Dennie Olde Kalter (89.47)	
8	16 March	Hildesheim	Andy Boulton (101.55)	5 – 0	Danny Jansen (98.52)	
9	16 March	Hildesheim	Andy Boulton (89.87)	5 – 4	Jamie Atkins (92.27)	
10	17 March	Hildesheim	Lee Cocks (93.94)	5 – 0	Wesley Plaisier (85.50)	
11	7 June	Leicester	Christian Kist (93.32)	5 – 4	Michael Unterbuchner (86.12)	
12	7 June	Leicester	Christian Kist (102.39)	5 – 3	John Henderson (100.55)	
13	8 June	Leicester	Connor Scutt (93.94)	5 – 0	Dragutin Horvat (81.88)	
14	8 June	Leicester	Justin Hood (107.24)	5 – 1	Dragutin Horvat (89.62)	
15	9 June	Leicester	Wesley Plaisier (89.79)	5 – 4	Damian Mol (84.93)	
16	16 August	Milton Keynes	Alexander Merkx (90.98)	5 – 3	Wesley Plaisier (86.22)	
17	16 August	Milton Keynes	Connor Scutt (85.17)	5 – 3	Tom Sykes (80.70)	
18	17 August	Milton Keynes	Jimmy van Schie (96.15)	5 – 4	Daniel Ayres (83.45)	
19	17 August	Milton Keynes	Wesley Plaisier (96.67)	5 – 3	Lee Cocks (88.96)	
20	18 August	Milton Keynes	Christian Kist (99.45)	5 – 2	Connor Scutt (91.87)	
21	2 November	Leicester	Alexander Merkx (92.83)	5 – 3	Darryl Pilgrim (85.88)	
22	2 November	Leicester	Andreas Harrysson (93.92)	5 – 2	Stefaan Henderyck (86.91)	
23	3 November	Leicester	Andreas Harrysson (96.74)	5 – 3	Connor Scutt (85.17)	
24	3 November	Leicester	Sebastian Białecki (90.71)	5 – 4	Ted Evetts (80.98)	

== PDC Development Tour ==
The 2024 Development Tour once again consisted of 4 weekends of 5 events, and 1 weekend of 4 events. The top 2 players on the Order of Merit received a PDC Tour Card and a place at the 2025 PDC World Darts Championship, meanwhile the winner of the Order of Merit received a spot at the 2024 Grand Slam of Darts as well. The Development Tour rankings additionally formed a large part of qualification for the 2024 PDC World Youth Championship. Furthermore, the top 8 ranked players from the 2024 Development Tour Order of Merit, who do not manage to earn a Tour Card for the 2025 season, qualified for the preliminary round group stage at the 2025 PDC World Masters and the first round of the 2025 UK Open.

No.	Date	Location	Winner	Legs	Runner-up	Ref.
1	23 February	Milton Keynes	Danny Jansen (90.94)	5 – 4	Owen Roelofs (97.84)	
2	23 February	Milton Keynes	Keane Barry (99.28)	5 – 4	Gian van Veen (96.57)	
3	24 February	Milton Keynes	Keane Barry (90.54)	5 – 0	Sebastian Białecki (87.54)	
4	24 February	Milton Keynes	Jurjen van der Velde (86.38)	5 – 0	Leighton Bennett (76.76)	
5	25 February	Milton Keynes	Gian van Veen (87.38)	5 – 0	Dylan Slevin (79.14)	
6	3 May	Hildesheim	Roman Benecký (85.23)	5 – 4	Thomas Banks (89.78)	
7	3 May	Hildesheim	Gian van Veen (93.69)	5 – 1	Nathan Rafferty (87.19)	
8	4 May	Hildesheim	Wessel Nijman (113.03)	5 – 4	Niko Springer (95.39)	
9	4 May	Hildesheim	Nathan Rafferty (89.97)	5 – 2	Danny Jansen (81.03)	
10	5 May	Hildesheim	Niko Springer (91.83)	5 – 2	Gian van Veen (98.01)	
11	21 June	Wigan	Beau Greaves (87.44)	5 – 1	Daniel Perry (74.20)	
12	21 June	Wigan	Keane Barry (92.22)	5 – 2	Angelo Balsamo (82.03)	
13	22 June	Wigan	Wessel Nijman (88.95)	5 – 2	Niko Springer (92.70)	
14	22 June	Wigan	Nathan Rafferty (91.32)	5 – 3	Marvin van Velzen (94.38)	
15	23 June	Wigan	Sebastian Białecki (91.75)	5 – 4	Levy Frauenfelder (84.85)	
16	26 July	Milton Keynes	Wessel Nijman (97.18)	5 – 4	Tavis Dudeney (96.65)	
17	26 July	Milton Keynes	Wessel Nijman (94.72)	5 – 3	Niko Springer (94.40)	
18	27 July	Milton Keynes	Niko Springer (90.49)	5 – 4	Wessel Nijman (94.92)	
19	27 July	Milton Keynes	Wessel Nijman (90.69)	5 – 2	Jack Male (91.18)	
20	28 July	Milton Keynes	Niko Springer (87.00)	5 – 3	Leon Weber (82.08)	
21	12 October	Wigan	Wessel Nijman (98.88)	5 – 0	Nathan Rafferty (79.96)	
22	12 October	Wigan	Wessel Nijman (93.10)	5 – 3	Nathan Rafferty (84.40)	
23	13 October	Wigan	Tavis Dudeney (84.44)	5 – 0	Jurjen van der Velde (78.96)	
24	13 October	Wigan	Henry Coates (83.39)	5 – 3	Owen Roelofs (81.40)	

=== World Youth Championship ===
The preliminary rounds of the 2024 World Youth Championship were held on 14 October 2024 at the Robin Park Leisure Centre, Wigan; while the final was held on 24 November 2024 at Butlin's Minehead before the final of the 2024 Players Championship Finals.

The 2022 champion Josh Rock, the 2023 World Youth champion Luke Littler, and Beau Greaves were among the players who chose not to the enter tournament.

Gian van Veen, the 2023 runner-up and top seed, defeated Jurjen van der Velde 6–5 in the final, Van der Velde having missed five match darts for the title.

The results from the third round onwards are shown below.

Third round (best of 11 legs); 14 October
1	Gian van Veen 94.52	6
16	Marvin van Velzen 83.28	2
8	Nathan Rafferty 90.33	6
24	Bradley Brooks 82.48	2
4	Wessel Nijman 97.79	6
13	Sebastian Białecki 90.85	3
5	Dylan Slevin 89.72	6
21	Dominik Grüllich 77.16	1
2	Keane Barry 95.80	6
15	Niko Springer 90.04	4
7	Kayden Milne 83.42	5
23	Jenson Walker 86.46	6
3	Adam Gawlas 76.69	6
19	Xanti Van den Bergh 70.95	1
6	Jurjen van der Velde 88.33	6
11	Roy Rietbergen 84.40	4

Quarter-finals (best of 11 legs); 14 October
1	Gian van Veen 93.99	6
8	Nathan Rafferty 95.49	4
4	Wessel Nijman 87.86	5
5	Dylan Slevin 90.84	6
2	Keane Barry 83.49	6
23	Jenson Walker 81.78	1
3	Adam Gawlas 83.38	5
6	Jurjen van der Velde 92.81	6

Semi-finals (best of 11 legs); 14 October
1	Gian van Veen 103.85	6
5	Dylan Slevin 94.42	2
2	Keane Barry 93.00	4
6	Jurjen van der Velde 91.27	6

Final (best of 11 legs); 24 November
1	Gian van Veen 96.96	6
6	Jurjen van der Velde 98.04	5

== PDC Women's Series ==
There were twenty-four Women's Series events in 2024. The top two players from the series qualified for the 2025 PDC World Darts Championship, while the top non-qualified player qualified for the 2024 Grand Slam of Darts. The top 8 ranked players from the last 12 Women's Series events of 2023 and the first 12 events of 2024 qualified for the 2024 Women's World Matchplay in Blackpool. The top 8 not-yet qualified players on the ranking qualified for the preliminary round group stage of the 2025 PDC World Masters.

No.	Date	Location	Winner	Legs	Runner-up	Ref.
1	23 March	Wigan	Fallon Sherrock (89.35)	5 – 4	Beau Greaves (85.63)	
2	23 March	Wigan	Noa-Lynn van Leuven (87.23)	5 – 2	Katie Sheldon (79.55)	
3	24 March	Wigan	Mikuru Suzuki (80.71)	5 – 2	Deta Hedman 80.55	
4	24 March	Wigan	Fallon Sherrock (87.82)	5 – 1	Beau Greaves (76.68)	
5	20 April	Wigan	Noa-Lynn van Leuven (90.65)	5 – 4	Beau Greaves (91.36)	
6	20 April	Wigan	Beau Greaves (86.62)	5 – 1	Lisa Ashton (73.44)	
7	21 April	Wigan	Beau Greaves (98.88)	5 – 0	Fallon Sherrock (86.75)	
8	21 April	Wigan	Mikuru Suzuki (74.33)	5 – 1	Beau Greaves (75.65)	
9	15 June	Wigan	Beau Greaves (91.17)	5 – 4	Mikuru Suzuki (87.33)	
10	15 June	Wigan	Gemma Hayter (72.00)	5 – 3	Rhian O'Sullivan (66.21)	
11	16 June	Wigan	Lisa Ashton (83.16)	5 – 1	Aileen de Graaf (71.03)	
12	16 June	Wigan	Lisa Ashton (89.39)	5 – 1	Beau Greaves (90.13)	
13	10 August	Niedernhausen	Beau Greaves (95.74)	5 – 1	Noa-Lynn van Leuven (77.70)	
14	10 August	Niedernhausen	Aileen de Graaf (67.93)	5 – 2	Anca Zijlstra (64.31)	
15	11 August	Niedernhausen	Noa-Lynn van Leuven (90.31)	5 – 4	Beau Greaves (92.93)	
16	11 August	Niedernhausen	Beau Greaves (90.00)	5 – 3	Noa-Lynn van Leuven (94.46)	
17	7 September	Wigan	Beau Greaves (80.95)	5 – 2	Fallon Sherrock (81.10)	
18	7 September	Wigan	Beau Greaves (78.94)	5 – 4	Noa-Lynn van Leuven (77.47)	
19	8 September	Wigan	Gemma Hayter (79.88)	5 – 1	Mikuru Suzuki (75.08)	
20	8 September	Wigan	Robyn Byrne (72.49)	5 – 2	Lorraine Winstanley (67.09)	
21	19 October	Leicester	Noa-Lynn van Leuven (109.64)	5 – 3	Beau Greaves (89.37)	
22	19 October	Leicester	Beau Greaves (89.63)	5 – 1	Fallon Sherrock (85.22)	
23	20 October	Leicester	Fallon Sherrock (83.11)	5 – 2	Mikuru Suzuki (79.24)	
24	20 October	Leicester	Angela Kirkwood (68.83)	5 – 4	Anastasia Dobromyslova (Note: Anastasia Dobromyslova has competed under a neutral designation since the 2022 Russian invasion of Ukraine.)	

== PDC Europe Next Gen ==
PDC Europe announced a new tournament series in November 2023 called PDC Europe Next Gen. There were 18 PDC Europe Next Gen events in 2024. There was a separate ranking list for the PDC Europe Next Gen, which was used directly for qualification for the PDC Europe Super League. The top 10 in the rankings qualified for the event and competed for a place in the 2025 PDC World Darts Championship.

2024 PDC Europe Next Gen final rankingafter 18 events
Rank	Player	Earnings
1	Niko Springer (Note: Did not participate in the PDC Europe Super League as he qualified for the 2025 PDC World Darts Championship via the Development Tour.)	€6,169
2	Steven Noster	€5,199
3	Patrick Tringler	€4,307
4	Marcel Hausotter	€4,156
5	Kai Gotthardt (Note: Already qualified for the 2024 PDC Europe Super League.)	€3,839
6	Marcel Gerdon	€3,817
7	Leon Weber	€3,400
8	Kevin Troppmann	€3,245
9	Michael Unterbuchner	€2,747
10	Patrick Klingelhöfer	€2,491
11	Pascal Wirotius	€2,291
12	Sascha Stuhlemmer	€2,261
13	Franz Rötzsch	€2,238

No.	Date	Location	Winner	Legs	Runner-up	Ref.
1	10–11 February	Hildesheim	Patrick Tringler (87.19)	6 – 5	Dragutin Horvat (87.74)	
2	10–11 February	Hildesheim	Sascha Stuhlemmer (87.64)	6 – 2	Kai Gotthardt (85.29)	
3	2–3 March	Eisenstadt	Kai Gotthardt (79.90)	6 – 2	David Schlichting (66.02)	
4	2–3 March	Eisenstadt	Patrick Tringler (74.16)	6 – 5	Niko Springer (71.58)	
5	15–16 June	Hildesheim	Niko Springer (103.66)	6 – 0	Marcel Gerdon 91.31	
6	15–16 June	Hildesheim	Steven Noster (88.39)	6 – 5	Kai Gotthardt (87.79)	
7	29–30 June	Eisenstadt	Niko Springer (81.81)	5 – 4	Marcel Gerdon (76.99)	
8	29–30 June	Eisenstadt	Marcel Hausotter (77.52)	5 – 3	Steven Noster (77.10)	
9	20–21 July	Sindelfingen	Niko Springer (87.19)	6 – 2	Maximilian Nirschl (74.60)	
10	20–21 July	Sindelfingen	Niko Springer (94.80)	6 – 4	Leon Weber 88.69	
11	3–4 August	Sindelfingen	Steven Noster (88.04)	6 – 3	Kai Gotthardt (89.75)	
12	3–4 August	Sindelfingen	Moritz Bohrmann (81.30)	6 – 5	Patrick Tringler (81.34)	
13	17–18 August	Hildesheim	Marcel Hausotter (78.80)	6 – 5	Fabian Herz (83.24)	
14	17–18 August	Hildesheim	Pascal Wirotius (85.49)	6 – 1	David Jeske (81.11)	
15	24–25 August	Hildesheim	Pascal Wirotius (72.30)	6 – 2	Marcel Gerdon (69.73)	
16	24–25 August	Hildesheim	Kevin Troppmann (85.24)	6 – 4	Steven Noster (83.39)	
17	14–15 September	Eisenstadt	Kevin Troppmann (86.59)	5 – 2	Patrick Klingelhöfer (78.16)	
18	14–15 September	Eisenstadt	Michael Unterbuchner (85.37)	5 – 1	Leon Weber (82.93)	

== PDC Asian Tour ==
There were 24 PDC Asian Tour events in 2024. The top four ranked players qualified for the 2025 PDC World Darts Championship. The top 8 not-yet qualified players on the ranking qualified for the 2025 PDC World Masters.

2024 Asian Tour final rankingafter 24 events
Rank	Player	Earnings
1	Alexis Toylo	$16,800
2	Lourence Ilagan	$12,900
3	Paolo Nebrida	$12,700
4	Ryusei Azemoto	$12,150
5	Man Lok Leung	$9,450
6	Tomoya Goto (Note: Qualified for 2025 PDC World Darts Championship via another method.)	$9,150
7	Sandro Eric Sosing	$7,650
8	Haruki Muramatsu	$6,350
9	Paul Lim	$5,000
10	Reynaldo Rivera	$4,350

No.	Date	Location	Winner	Legs	Runner-up	Ref.
1	13–14 January	Dubai	Alexis Toylo (91.47)	5 – 3	Paolo Nebrida (90.76)	
2	13–14 January	Dubai	Alexis Toylo (93.70)	5 – 3	Joel Hizon (86.47)	
3	13–14 January	Dubai	Paolo Nebrida (88.24)	5 – 3	Nitin Kumar (80.85)	
4	16–17 March	Kyoto	Alexis Toylo (86.60)	5 – 4	Noel Malicdem (89.37)	
5	16–17 March	Kyoto	Sandro Eric Sosing (96.32)	5 – 3	Tomoya Goto (87.24)	
6	16–17 March	Kyoto	Shusaku Nakamura (79.38)	5 – 3	Seigo Asada (84.81)	
7	20–21 April	Manila	Alexis Toylo (94.57)	5 – 4	Haruki Muramatsu (91.67)	
8	20–21 April	Manila	Ryusei Azemoto (82.81)	5 – 3	Tomoya Goto (81.24)	
9	20–21 April	Manila	Ryusei Azemoto (77.90)	5 – 1	Alexis Toylo (73.64)	
10	18–19 May	Penang	Lourence Ilagan (82.02)	5 – 2	Alexis Toylo (71.48)	
11	18–19 May	Penang	Alexis Toylo (99.06)	5 – 2	Paolo Nebrida (91.49)	
12	18–19 May	Penang	Ryusei Azemoto (93.94)	5 – 0	Reynaldo Rivera (83.46)	
13	8–9 June	Ulaanbaatar	Paolo Nebrida (105.36)	5 – 4	Tomoya Goto (95.91)	
14	8–9 June	Ulaanbaatar	Paolo Nebrida (88.47)	5 – 1	Ryusei Azemoto (79.84)	
15	8–9 June	Ulaanbaatar	Man Lok Leung (89.02)	5 – 2	Sandro Eric Sosing (78.54)	
16	10–11 August	Singapore	Man Lok Leung (74.47)	5 – 1	Lourence Ilagan (75.89)	
17	10–11 August	Singapore	Lourence Ilagan (86.51)	5 – 1	Alexis Toylo (75.33)	
18	10–11 August	Singapore	Paolo Nebrida (89.93)	5 – 4	Lourence Ilagan (96.47)	
19	4–6 October	Qingdao	Ryusei Azemoto (87.80)	5 – 2	Mitsuhiko Tatsunami (89.95)	
20	4–6 October	Qingdao	Jenn Ming Tan (76.30)	5 – 3	Man Lok Leung (76.69)	
21	4–6 October	Qingdao	Tomoya Goto (86.58)	5 – 4	Lourence Ilagan (90.14)	
22	4–6 October	Qingdao	Lihao Wen (88.37)	5 – 4	Lourence Ilagan (84.43)	
23	4–6 October	Qingdao	Lourence Ilagan (87.17)	5 – 4	Haruki Muramatsu (91.09)	
24	4–6 October	Qingdao	Haruki Muramatsu (86.01)	5 – 4	Lihao Wen (85.01)	

=== PDC Asian Championship ===
The 2024 PDC Asian Championship was held in Manila. The results from the second round onwards are shown below. The winner qualified for the 2024 Grand Slam of Darts. The winner and runner-up also qualified for the 2025 PDC World Darts Championship. With Ilagan already being qualified via the Asian Tour, Lee qualified as next-best-placed non-qualified player from the PDC Asian Championship.

Second round (best of 9 legs); 19 October
Alexis Toylo 99.03	5
Eduardo Largo 97.43	1
Nitin Kumar 83.32	4
Lok Yin Lee 85.19	5
Sandro Eric Sosing 89.41	5
Yoshihisa Baba 79.46	4
John Mark Bracero 78.57	4
Rodolfo Jr. Escaros 81.61	5
Lourence Ilagan 91.68	5
John Marco Lumilang 91.11	3
Reynaldo Rivera 97.37	5
Abdul Qahar 88.58	1
Paolo Nebrida 86.57	4
Jenn Ming Tan 82.95	5
Raymond Copano 72.28	0
Marvic Meana 83.50	5

Quarter-finals (best of 11 legs); 20 October
Alexis Toylo 77.11	2
Lok Yin Lee 89.16	6
Sandro Eric Sosing 90.32	6
Rodolfo Jr. Escaros 83.33	3
Lourence Ilagan 84.40	6
Reynaldo Rivera 74.42	4
Jenn Ming Tan 72.27	6
Marvic Meana 66.29	3

Semi-finals (best of 11 legs); 20 October
Lok Yin Lee 85.83	5
Sandro Eric Sosing 84.43	6
Lourence Ilagan 85.89	6
Jenn Ming Tan 82.88	1

Final (best of 13 legs); 20 October
Sandro Eric Sosing 85.77	3
Lourence Ilagan 92.71	7

=== PDJ Japan Tour ===
The PDJ announced the first edition of the Japan Tour. 10 events, followed by a final, decided who qualified for the 2025 PDC World Darts Championship.

2024 Japan Tour final rankingafter 10 events
Rank	Player	Points
1	Seigo Asada	384
2	Ryuta Arihara	368
3	Tsukasa Moritani	322
4	Sho Okano	312
5	Kenichi Ajiki	296
6	Shingo Enomata	262
7	Yuichiro Ogawa	230
8	Jun Matsuda	222
9	Mitsuhiko Tatsunami	218
10	Keita Ono	214

No.	Date	Location	Winner	Legs	Runner-up	Ref.
1	27–28 April	Hamamatsu	Seigo Asada (93.67)	4 – 3	Yoshihisa Baba (94.50)	
2	27–28 April	Hamamatsu	Seigo Asada (88.04)	4 – 1	Yuichiro Ogawa (78.53)	
3	27–28 April	Hamamatsu	Mitsuhiko Tatsunami (77.08)	4 – 0	Taiyo Nishimata (66.92)	
4	27–28 April	Hamamatsu	Jun Matsuda (81.00)	4 – 1	Shogo Fuse (68.13)	
5	13–14 July	Kobe	Ryuta Arihara (84.79)	4 – 1	Masumi Chino (79.08)	
6	13–14 July	Kobe	Tomoya Goto (87.28)	4 – 1	Yuta Hayashi (77.09)	
7	13–14 July	Kobe	Kenichi Ajiki (91.64)	4 – 3	Sho Okano (82.55)	
8	13–14 July	Kobe	Seigo Asada (95.43)	4 – 0	Ryuta Arihara (81.25)	
9	7–8 September	Shizuoka	Nobuhiro Yamamoto (82.36)	4 – 0	Tsukasa Moritani (74.88)	
10	7–8 September	Shizuoka	Tsukasa Moritani (72.28)	4 – 3	Takayuki Masatsu (71.59)	

The PDJ Japan Tour final was contested on 8 September 2024. The winner qualified for the PDC World Championship. The results from the quarter-final onwards are shown.

Quarter-finals (best of 9 legs); 8 Sep
1	Seigo Asada 93.57	5
24	Motomu Sakai 83.83	2
13	Katsuya Aiba 73.46	2
5	Kenichi Ajiki 81.28	5
18	Toyokazu Shibata 77.06	2
23	Nobuhiro Yamamoto 75.35	5
14	Tomoya Goto 90.54	5
6	Shingo Enomata 60.33	0

Semi-finals (best of 9 legs); 8 Sep
1	Seigo Asada 86.53	4
5	Kenichi Ajiki 88.08	5
23	Nobuhiro Yamamoto 72.97	0
14	Tomoya Goto 81.68	5

Final (best of 9 legs); 8 Sep
5	Kenichi Ajiki 80.45	2
14	Tomoya Goto 83.83	5

=== PDC China Championship ===
PDC China Championship was contested on 18 August 2024. The winner qualified for the PDC World Championship. The results from the quarter-final onwards are shown.

Quarter-finals (best of 3 sets); 18 Aug
Xiaochen Zong 81.61	2
Zhiwei Lin 75.52	1
Binjie He 67.48	0
Xicheng Han 69.82	2
Jingsong Lin 61.42	0
Wenqing Liu 68.90	2
Bin Zheng 74.16	2
Zizhao Zheng 69.22	1

Semi-finals (best of 3 sets); 18 Aug
Xiaochen Zong 85.89	2
Xicheng Han 73.91	0
Wenqing Liu 66.01	2
Bin Zheng 68.38	1

Final (best of 5 sets); 18 Aug
Xiaochen Zong 80.05	3
Wenqing Liu 68.58	0

=== PDC China Premier League ===
2024 China Premier League ranking after 7 events
Rank	Player	Points
1	Xiaochen Zong	28
2	Chengan Liu	13
3	Bin Zheng	13
4	Yuanjun Liu	11

2024 China Premier League
Night	Date	Winner	Legs	Runner-up	Ref.
1	2 March	Bin Zheng (76.87)	5 – 1	Xiaochen Zong (76.75)	
2	2 March	Xiaochen Zong (92.22)	5 – 3	Yuanjun Liu (82.61)	
3	3 March	Xiaochen Zong (87.38)	5 – 0	Yuanjun Liu (76.56)	
4	3 March	Yuanjun Liu (73.96)	5 – 4	Chengan Liu (71.50)	
5	13 April	Xiaochen Zong (102.95)	5 – 0	Lihao Wen (84.35)	
6	13 April	Chengan Liu (80.34)	5 – 3	Xiaochen Zong (82.51)	
7	14 April	Xiaochen Zong (93.57)	5 – 4	Chengan Liu (88.12)	

The 2024 China Premier League playoff was held on 14 April.

Semi-finals (best of 19 legs); 14 Apr
1	Xiaochen Zong (86.70)	10
4	Yuanjun Liu (79.07)	3
2	Chengan Liu (84.91)	10
3	Bin Zheng (75.31)	4

Final (best of 21 legs); 14 Apr
1	Xiaochen Zong (93.84)	11
2	Chengan Liu (87.77)	1

== PDC Nordic & Baltic (PDCNB) Tour ==
The PDC Nordic and Baltic Tour was held over 6 weekends. The winner qualified for the 2025 PDC World Darts Championship. The top 8 not-yet qualified players on the ranking qualified for the 2025 PDC Winmau World Masters.

2024 PDCNB Tour final standingsafter 10 events
Rank	Player	Earnings
1	Jeffrey de Graaf	€5,125
2	Darius Labanauskas	€4,450
3	Johan Engström	€4,000
4	Oskar Lukasiak	€3,425
5	Marko Kantele	€2,975
6	Andreas Harrysson	€2,850
7	Cor Dekker	€2,600
8	Teemu Harju	€1,825
9	Jani Laurila	€875
10	(Norway) Kent Joran Sivertsen	€850

No.	Date	Location	Winner	Legs	Runner-up	Ref.
1	16–18 February	Latvia	Jeffrey de Graaf (89.28)	6 – 1	Jani Laurila (78.71)	
2	16–18 February	Latvia	Marko Kantele (94.80)	6 – 4	Johan Engström (83.25)	
3	4–7 April	Sweden	Johan Engström (86.22)	6 – 4	Oskar Lukasiak (84.55)	
4	4–7 April	Sweden	Jeffrey de Graaf (87.09)	6 – 5	Cor Dekker (86.53)	
5	31 May–2 June	Finland	Johan Engström (93.35)	6 – 2	Cor Dekker (84.00)	
6	31 May–2 June	Finland	Jeffrey de Graaf (82.36)	6 – 3	Oskar Lukasiak (83.81)	
7	26–28 July	Denmark	Darius Labanauskas (82.96)	6 – 5	Jeffrey de Graaf (81.55)	
8	26–28 July	Denmark	Oskar Lukasiak (84.19)	6 – 3	Marko Kantele (79.42)	
9	24–25 August	Iceland	Andreas Harrysson (89.51)	6 – 5	Darius Labanauskas (86.73)	
10	24–25 August	Iceland	Darius Labanauskas (94.00)	6 – 4	Teemu Harju (82.84)	

== Dart Players Australia Tour (DPA) Tour ==
The Dart Players Australia Tour was held over 5 weekends. The winner qualified for the 2025 PDC World Darts Championship. The top 8 not-yet qualified players on the ranking qualified for the 2025 PDC Winmau World Masters.

2024 DPA Tour final rankingafter 15 events
Rank	Player	Earnings
1	Joe Comito	$5,950
2	Brandon Weening	$4,700
3	Jeremy Fagg	$4,650
4	Brenton Lloyd	$4,500
5	Gordon Mathers	$4,450
6	Harley Kemp	$3,900
7	Rob Modra	$3,400
8	James Bailey	$3,200
9	Brody Klinge	$3,000
10	Tim Pusey	$2,700

No.	Date	Location	Winner	Legs	Runner-up	Ref.
1	10–11 February	Warilla Bowls & Recreation Club	(84.47) Brenton Lloyd	6 – 5	Harley Kemp (88.64)	
2	10–11 February	Warilla Bowls & Recreation Club	(85.33) Brandon Weening	6 – 4	Rob Modra (78.17)	
3	10–11 February	Warilla Bowls & Recreation Club	(86.14) Gordon Mathers	3 – 1	Brenton Lloyd (79.92)	
4	6–7 April	Geelong Greyhound Club	(84.31) Rob Modra	6 – 4	Joe Comito (80.26)	
5	6–7 April	Geelong Greyhound Club	(93.23) Jeremy Fagg	6 – 3	Brenton Lloyd (82.43)	
6	6–7 April	Geelong Greyhound Club	(99.25) Gordon Mathers	3 – 1	Brody Klinge (97.06)	
7	15–16 June	Commercial Club Albury	(80.10) Stuart Coburn	6 – 4	Tim Pusey (79.75)	
8	15–16 June	Commercial Club Albury	(83.25) Brenton Lloyd	6 – 3	Brandon Weening (75.19)	
9	15–16 June	Commercial Club Albury	(90.81) Brody Klinge	3 – 0	Brandon Weening (87.32)	
10	13–14 July	Mittagong RSL NSW	(92.42) Tim Pusey	6 – 3	Harley Kemp (88.72)	
11	13–14 July	Mittagong RSL NSW	(85.91) Jeremy Fagg	6 – 4	Brandon Weening (75.75)	
12	13–14 July	Mittagong RSL NSW	(85.60) Joe Comito	3 – 1	Harley Kemp (81.20)	
13	13–14 September	Fraternity Club Wollongong NSW	(85.46) James Bailey	6 – 4	Joe Comito (85.66)	
14	13–14 September	Fraternity Club Wollongong NSW	(85.29) Joe Comito	6 – 4	Danny Porter (85.21)	
15	13–14 September	Fraternity Club Wollongong NSW	(93.39) Joe Comito	3 – 1	Stuart Coburn (85.61)	

=== DPA Oceanic Masters 2024 ===
2024 DPA Oceanic Masters took place on 20 October 2024. The winner qualified for the 2025 PDC World Darts Championship. The results from the quarter-final onwards are shown.

Quarter-finals (best of 5 sets); 20 Oct
Kayden Milne 82.58	2
Harley Kemp 78.26	3
Josh Walters 77.69	1
James Bailey 79.49	3
Harrison Donegan 65.31	0
Jaymie Hilton-Jones 72.12	3
Mark Cleaver 85.07	1
Gordon Mathers 88.86	3

Semi-finals (best of 5 sets); 20 Oct
Harley Kemp 86.91	3
James Bailey 76.96	1
Jaymie Hilton-Jones 76.60	1
Gordon Mathers 82.50	3

Final (best of 5 sets); 20 Oct
Harley Kemp 82.71	1
Gordon Mathers 85.27	3

== Dart Players New Zealand (DPNZ) Tour ==
The DPNZ Tour was held over 6 weekends. The top 8 not-yet qualified players on the ranking qualified for the preliminary rounds of the 2025 PDC World Masters.

2024 DPNZ Tour final Rankingsafter 12 event
Rank	Player	Points
1	Kayden Milne	132
2	Mark Cleaver	128
3	Ben Robb	120
4	John Hurring	112
5	Haupai Puha	68
6	Jaymie Hilton-Jones	60
7	Darren Herewini	56
8	Stu Irwin	44
9	Wayne McRae	44
10	Max Dallimore	40

No.	Date	Location	Winner	Legs	Runner-up	Ref.
1	24–25 February	Black Horse Hotel, Christchurch	Kayden Milne (89.54)	7 – 4	Ben Robb (81.51)	
2	24–25 February	Black Horse Hotel, Christchurch	Mark Cleaver (89.04)	7 – 3	Warren Parry (79.53)	
3	23–24 March	Birkenhead RSA, Auckland	Ben Robb (91.72)	7 – 3	Kayden Milne (83.25)	
4	23–24 March	Birkenhead RSA, Auckland	John Hurring (84.80)	7 – 5	Deon Toki (82.46)	
5	27–28 April	Sun City, Nelson	John Hurring (89.49)	7 – 4	Kayden Milne (79.24)	
6	27–28 April	Sun City, Nelson	(74.15) Jordan Whyte	7 – 5	Kayden Milne (74.95)	
7	11–12 May	Hamilton Cossie Club, Hamilton	John Hurring (87.86)	7 – 6	Mark Cleaver (86.44)	
8	11–12 May	Hamilton Cossie Club, Hamilton	Mark Cleaver (77.13)	7 – 1	Hipirini Tewhakaara (71.86)	
9	7–8 September	Kapi Mana Darts, Wellington	Haupai Puha (90.62)	7 – 2	Tukina Weko (80.85)	
10	7–8 September	Kapi Mana Darts, Wellington	Ben Robb (86.28)	7 – 5	Kayden Milne (84.36)	
11	5–6 October	Hamilton Cosmopolitan Club, Hamilton	Mark Cleaver (85.70)	7 – 3	Haupai Puha (84.53)	
12	5–6 October	Hamilton Cosmopolitan Club, Hamilton	Haupai Puha (82.72)	7 – 1	Jaymie Hilton-Jones (68.04)	

=== DPNZ Winmau 2024 - Top 16 Playoffs ===
DPNZ Winmau 2024 - Top 16 Playoffs was contested on 7 October 2024. The winner qualified for the PDC World Championship. The results from the quarter-final onwards are shown.

Quarter-finals (best of 11 legs); 6 Oct
1	Kayden Milne 100.46	6
13	Jordan Whyte 81.45	2
4	John Hurring 89.76	3
5	Haupai Puha 93.71	6
2	Mark Cleaver 75.70	6
7	Darren Herewini 77.41	2
3	Ben Robb 93.17	6
14	Deon Toki 75.89	1

Semi-finals (best of 13 legs); 6 Oct
1	Kayden Milne 70.20	1
5	Haupai Puha 90.91	7
2	Mark Cleaver 88.60	6
3	Ben Robb 91.67	7

Final (best of 15 legs); 6 Oct
5	Haupai Puha 86.19	4
3	Ben Robb 87.52	8

== Championship Darts Circuit (CDC) ==
The CDC Tour was held over 5 weekends. The best Canadian/American and the best player not yet qualified after 14 events qualified for 2025 PDC World Darts Championship with a place at Q-School also guaranteed for the winner of the tour. The top 8 not-yet qualified players on the ranking qualified for the preliminary rounds of the 2025 PDC World Masters.

2024 CDC Tour final rankingafter 14 events
Rank	Player	Points
1	Leonard Gates	108
2	Jim Long	108
3	Stowe Buntz	104
4	Adam Sevada	102
5	David Cameron	96
6	Alex Spellman	95
7	Jacob Taylor	81
8	Jake Womack	77
9	Gary Mawson	73
10	Doug Boehm	60

No.	Date	Location	Winner	Legs	Runner-up	Ref.
1	18–19 May	Brownsburg, Indiana	Leonard Gates (102.76)	7 – 3	Doug Boehm (102.20)	
2	18–19 May	Brownsburg, Indiana	David Cameron (95.29)	7 – 5	Jeff Smith (88.61)	
3	13–14 July	Oakbrook Terrace, Illinois	Gary Mawson (84.70)	7 – 4	Jeff Springer (87.18)	
4	13–14 July	Oakbrook Terrace, Illinois	Stowe Buntz (92.18)	7 – 5	Jacob Taylor (98.58)	
5	13–14 July	Oakbrook Terrace, Illinois	David Cameron (86.64)	7 – 6	Jeff Smith (83.71)	
6	3–4 August	Wheeling, Illinois	Jim Long (97.71)	7 – 6	Leonard Gates (88.34)	
7	3–4 August	Wheeling, Illinois	Stowe Buntz (83.61)	7 – 5	David Cameron (88.74)	
8	3–4 August	Wheeling, Illinois	Leonard Gates (91.42)	7 – 3	Alex Spellman (85.92)	
9	23–25 August	Niagara Falls, New York	Leonard Gates (86.29)	7 – 4	Adam Sevada (79.39)	
10	23–25 August	Niagara Falls, New York	Jim Long (82.27)	7 – 3	Jacob Taylor (88.63)	
11	23–25 August	Niagara Falls, New York	Alex Spellman (87.13)	7 – 4	Stowe Buntz (86.55)	
12	20–22 September	Brownsburg, Indiana	Adam Sevada (92.08)	7 – 6	Jim Long (89.39)	
13	20–22 September	Brownsburg, Indiana	Jake Womack (89.10)	7 – 6	Jim Long (86.74)	
14	20–22 September	Brownsburg, Indiana	Adam Sevada (100.92)	7 – 3	Stowe Buntz (95.85)	

=== North American Championship ===
As in the previous year, the North American Championship was played on the Saturday afternoon of the US Darts Masters. The winner would have qualified for the 2025 PDC World Darts Championship and 2024 Grand Slam of Darts, but under PDC Rule 3.9, the champion Matt Campbell was not eligible to qualify for the World Championship or Grand Slam by virtue of winning the North American Championship as he was in the third year of his PDC Tour Card. Campbell would later qualify for the World Championship through the PDC Tour Card Holder Qualifiers.

Quarter-finals (best of 11 legs); 1 Jun
1	Matt Campbell 93.93	6
Jeff Smith 87.27	4
4	Alex Spellman 90.46	5
David Cameron 88.51	6
2	Danny Lauby 87.98	3
Adam Sevada 88.79	6
3	Jules van Dongen 78.12	3
Stowe Buntz 81.95	6

Semi-finals (best of 11 legs); 1 Jun
1	Matt Campbell 92.75	6
David Cameron 86.00	4
Adam Sevada 76.69	2
Stowe Buntz 81.64	6

Final (best of 11 legs); 1 Jun
1	Matt Campbell 95.43	6
Stowe Buntz 88.78	4

=== Cross-Border Darts Challenge ===
First round (best of 9 legs); 13 Apr
USA1	Alex Spellman 97.21	5
Sylvain Bourdeau 89.12	2
CAN4	Keith Way 85.02	5
Jules van Dongen 82.13	2
CAN2	Jacob Taylor 80.31	5
Larry Butler 79.57	2
USA3	Leonard Gates 94.23	3
Jake Macmillan 87.41	5
CAN1	David Cameron 85.77	5
Doug Boehm 78.87	1
USA4	Danny Lauby 87.33	5
Steve Warnock 81.21	2
USA2	Stowe Buntz 87.24	5
John Part 82.82	1
CAN3	Jim Long 88.50	5
Jason Brandon 87.12	3

Quarter-finals (best of 9 legs); 14 Apr
USA1	Alex Spellman 91.99	5
CAN4	Keith Way 82.49	2
CAN2	Jacob Taylor 77.70	2
Jake Macmillan 77.02	5
CAN1	David Cameron 97.36	5
USA4	Danny Lauby 90.14	4
USA2	Stowe Buntz 95.87	5
CAN3	Jim Long 90.74	1

Semi-finals (best of 11 legs); 14 Apr
USA1	Alex Spellman 94.36	6
Jake Macmillan 84.48	5
CAN1	David Cameron 87.13	6
USA2	Stowe Buntz 82.55	4

Final (best of 13 legs); 14 Apr
USA1	Alex Spellman 91.55	7
CAN1	David Cameron 91.93	6

=== 2024 CDC Continental Cup ===
2024 CDC Continental Cup took place on 18–19 October 2024. The winner qualified for the 2024 Grand Slam of Darts.

First round (best of 9 legs); 18 Oct
1	Leonard Gates 84.76	5
16	Nick Linberg 85.44	3
8	Gary Mawson 89.15	4
9	Doug Boehm 88.22	5
4	Adam Sevada 88.16	5
13	Larry Butler 82.49	3
5	Alex Spellman 91.59	5
12	Joey Lynaugh 87.27	3
2	Jim Long 79.62	5
15	Jack Robinson 58.73	1
7	Jake Womack 88.69	5
10	Jeff Springer 81.78	1
3	Stowe Buntz 92.02	5
14	John Part 84.81	2
6	Jacob Taylor 81.49	5
11	Steve Warnock 68.39	3

Quarter-finals (best of 11 legs); 19 Oct
1	Leonard Gates 87.55	6
9	Doug Boehm 83.14	3
4	Adam Sevada 84.54	3
5	Alex Spellman 92.33	6
2	Jim Long 80.05	6
7	Jake Womack 80.46	4
3	Stowe Buntz 89.66	6
6	Jacob Taylor 86.26	3

Semi-finals (best of 13 legs); 19 Oct
1	Leonard Gates 91.79	7
5	Alex Spellman 88.10	5
2	Jim Long 90.69	7
3	Stowe Buntz 92.45	6

Final (best of 15 legs); 19 Oct
1	Leonard Gates 87.24	8
2	Jim Long 84.00	7

The CDC Evolution Tour 2024 final was held on the same day as the CDC Continental Cup, with the following results:

Winner	Legs	Runner-up	Ref.
Nicholas Cripps (55.04)	6 – 5	Douglas Dimichele (56.06)	

== Championship Darts Latin America and Caribbean (CDLC) Tour ==
2024 CDLC Tour ranking
Rank	Player	Points
1	Rashad Sweeting	56
2	Sudesh Fitzgerald	40
3	Guillermo Soto	39
4	Norman Madhoo	38

No.	Date	Location	Winner	Legs	Runner-up	Ref.
1	20–21 July	Montego Bay	Rashad Sweeting (74.71)	6 – 5	Guillermo Soto (64.90)	
2	20–21 July	Montego Bay	Norman Madhoo (77.24)	6 – 5	Sudesh Fitzgerald (72.99)	
3	4–6 October	Santiago	Rashad Sweeting (76.58)	6 – 1	Sudesh Fitzgerald (75.86)	
4	4–6 October	Santiago	Guillermo Soto (73.06)	6 – 5	Rashad Sweeting (72.70)	

In 2024, the women's tour was held for the first time.

No.	Date	Location	Winner	Legs	Runner-up	Ref.
1	19 July	Montego Bay	Karen Ramcharan (63.75)	4 – 1	Kimberli Rivas (54.88)	

== African Continental Tour (ACT) ==
This year the ACT Tour was held over 6 weekends. The round 3 in Uganda was canceled due to the unpreparedness of the venue.

2024 African Continental Tour ranking
Rank	Player	Earnings
1	Cameron Carolissen	R42,000
2	Johan Geldenhuys	R36,750
3	Carl Gabriel	R15,250

No.	Date	Location	Winner	Legs	Runner-up	Ref.
1	1–3 March	Cape Town	Samuel Gatura (76.70)	8 – 4	Cameron Carolissen (74.51)	
2	3–5 May	Gqeberha	Cameron Carolissen (83.76)	8 – 3	Carl Gabriel (83.87)	
3	27–28 July	Kimberley	Johan Geldenhuys (79.22)	8 – 7	Cameron Carolissen (75.11)	
4	27–29 September	Nairobi	Cameron Carolissen (85.66)	8 – 7	Peter Wachiuri (80.81)	
5	18–20 October	Gauteng	Johan Geldenhuys (68.95)	8 – 4	Carl Gabriel (66.16)	
6	15 November	Cape Town	Johan Geldenhuys (79.30)	8 – 7	Cameron Carolissen (81.55)	

In 2024, the women's tour was held for the first time.

No.	Date	Location	Winner	Legs	Runner-up	Ref.
1	3 March	Cape Town	Susan Kiringuru (45.43)	5 – 2	Leane van der Walt (43.35)	
2	5 May	Gqeberha	Leane van der Walt (37.23)	8 – 1	Cassidy Harmse (34.86)	
3	28 July	Kimberley	Heila Pain (43.50)	5 – 3	Valerie Petersen (42.52)	
4	28 September	Nairobi	Susan Wanja (52.21)	5 – 3	Ann Machira (50.17)	
5	18 October	Gauteng	Zeidi Kruger (45.82)	5 – 0	Heila Pain (39.45)	

The African Darts Series - PDC World Youth Championship Qualifier 2024 final was contested on 5 May 2024, with the following results:

Winner	Legs	Runner-up	Ref.
Kendrick Koordom (70.33)	6 – 2	Tylor Shears (66.04)	

=== ADS PDC World Championship Qualifier 2024 ===
ADS PDC World Championship Qualifier 2024 was contested on 29 September 2024. The winner may participate in the PDC World Championship. The results from the quarter-final onwards are shown.

Quarter-finals (best of 11 legs); 29 Sep
1	Cameron Carolissen 77.74	6
Francis Waithaka 61.39	0
13	Evans Njuguna 70.69	5
5	Nathan Njeru 72.15	6
Patrick Ocheng 72.23	6
Felix Mwaura 71.35	1
3	Carl Gabriel 74.93	5
Peter Wachiuri 76.27	6

Semi-finals (best of 13 legs); 29 Sep
1	Cameron Carolissen 80.50	7
5	Nathan Njeru 76.98	5
Patrick Ocheng 82.06	5
Peter Wachiuri 87.11	7

Final (best of 15 legs); 29 Sep
1	Cameron Carolissen 85.03	8
Peter Wachiuri 85.96	7
