= 2025 PDC World Darts Championship =

Darts tournament

2024/25 Paddy Power World Darts Championship

Tournament information
- Dates: 15 December 2024 – 3 January 2025
- Venue: Alexandra Palace
- Location: London, England
- Organisation(s): Professional Darts Corporation (PDC)
- Format: Sets; Final – first to 7 sets
- Prize fund: £2,500,000
- Winner's share: £500,000
- Nine-dart finish: Christian Kist; Damon Heta
- High checkout: 170; Nick Kenny; Joe Cullen; Kevin Doets; Chris Dobey; Luke Littler

Champion(s)
- Luke Littler (ENG)

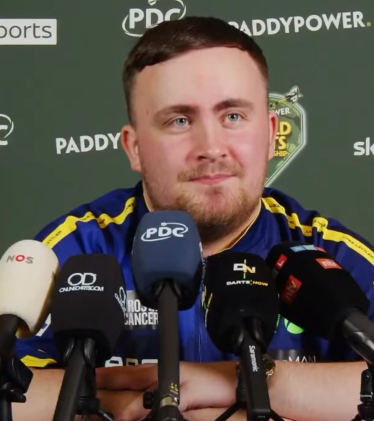
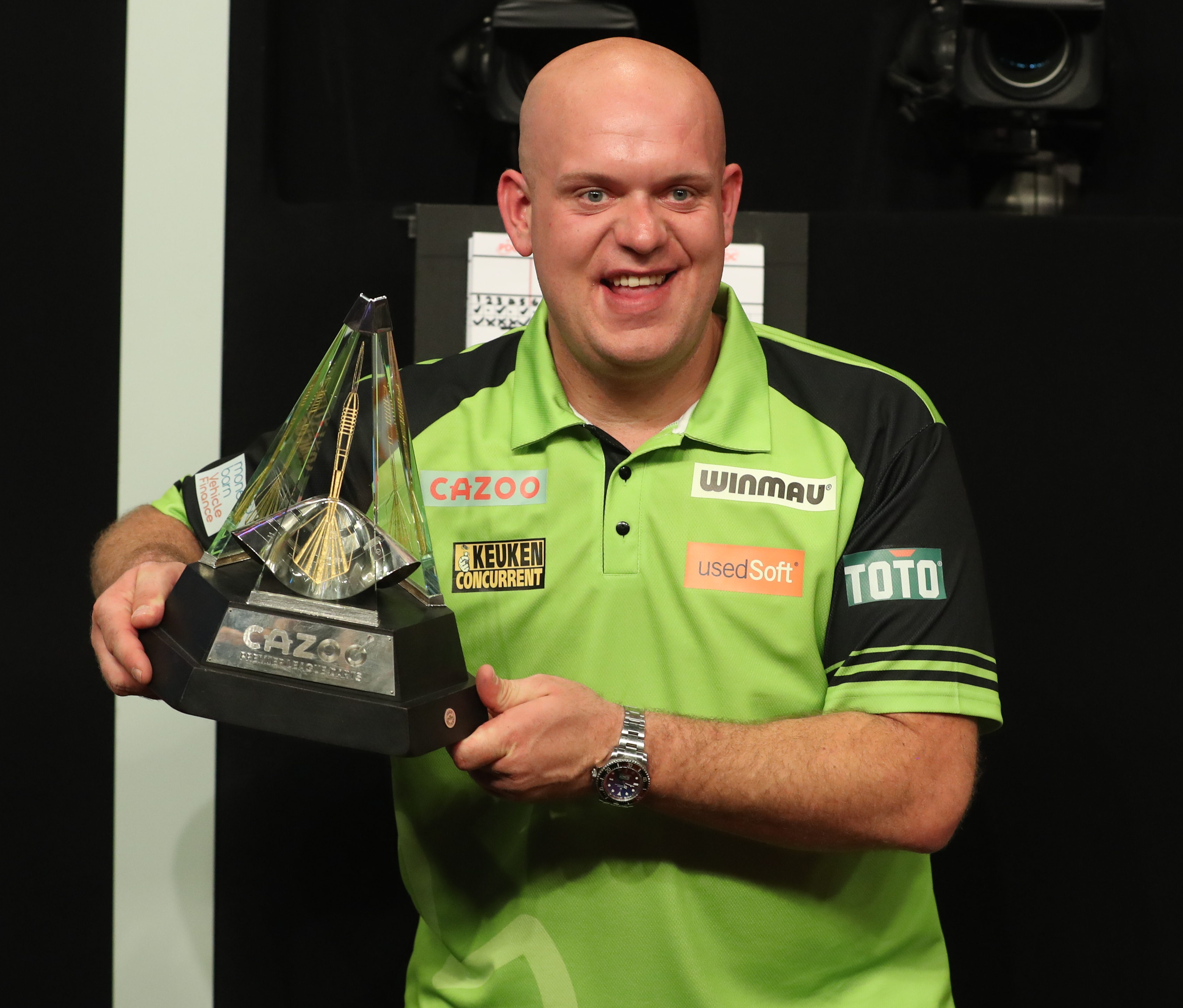
Luke Littler won the world championship for the first time in his career, defeating 3-time champion Michael van Gerwen in the final.

The 2025 PDC World Darts Championship (known for sponsorship reasons as the 2024/25 Paddy Power World Darts Championship) was a professional darts tournament that was held from 15 December 2024 to 3 January 2025 at Alexandra Palace in London, England. It was the thirty-second World Darts Championship to be organised by the Professional Darts Corporation and the eighteenth to be held at Alexandra Palace. The winner received £500,000 from a total prize fund of £2,500,000.

The tournament featured 96 players, with the top 32 highest ranked players on the PDC Order of Merit being seeded through to the second round. Luke Humphries was the defending champion, having defeated Luke Littler 7–4 in the 2024 final. However, Humphries lost 4–1 to Peter Wright in the fourth round.

In his 3–1 second-round victory over Ryan Meikle, Littler set a new record for the highest three-dart set average in a World Championship match, with 140.91 in the final set. Littler went on to beat Nathan Aspinall 5–2 in the quarter-finals and Stephen Bunting 6–1 in the semi-finals to reach a second consecutive final, where he defeated Michael van Gerwen 7–3 to win his first world title. Aged 17 years and 347 days, Littler became the youngest world champion in darts history. He also won the Ballon d'Art trophy for scoring the most 180s in the tournament, with 76.

Christian Kist and Damon Heta both hit nine-dart finishes at the tournament, with both players earning a £60,000 bonus.

== Overview ==
The 2025 PDC World Darts Championship was the 32nd World Darts Championship organised by the Professional Darts Corporation, and the 18th to be held at Alexandra Palace in London, England. It took place from 15 December 2024 to 3 January 2025. The championship featured 96 participants, with the top 32 highest ranked players on the PDC Order of Merit being seeded through to the second round. The 32 qualifiers from the Pro Tour Order of Merit and the 32 other players from various qualifiers start in the first round.

Irish gambling company Paddy Power continued their sponsorship of the event, having agreed a three-year contract with the PDC ahead of the 2024 edition. As part of its promotion of the event, Paddy Power announced 'The Bigger 180' campaign, for which the bookmaker would, as last year, donate £1,000 to charity Prostate Cancer UK for every maximum score of 180 achieved during the tournament, while also introducing a £180,000 bonus for a nine-dart finish hit at the tournament, shared equally between the charity, the player, and a fan in the Alexandra Palace crowd.

Going into the event, the previous year's finalists were viewed by bookmakers as the tournament favourites with Luke Littler having won the Premier League, the World Series Finals, and the Grand Slam of Darts, and defending champion Luke Humphries having won the World Matchplay and the Players Championship Finals.

=== Format ===
All matches were played as straight in (player begins scoring with their first throw no matter what section is hit), double out (a segment on the outer ring or the bullseye), requiring the players to score 501 points to win a leg, finishing on a double. The matches were played in the set format, with a minimum of three sets required to win a match. The following rules are observed:

- All sets were played to the best of five legs in the first round, and also in non-deciding sets of subsequent rounds.
- In the deciding set of all but the first round, the first player to win at least three legs and be leading by two or more won the set and the match. If the set reached a 5–5 tie without a winner, it was decided by a sudden-death leg with no throw for the bull.

Round	Best of (sets)	First to (sets)
First & Second	5	3
Third & Fourth	7	4
Quarter-finals	9	5
Semi-finals	11	6
Final	13	7

=== Ranking ===
The rankings on the PDC Order of Merit are calculated on a two-year basis. Players who participated in the 2023 PDC World Darts Championship were defending their prize money from that event on their ranking. At the end of the tournament, the PDC Order of Merit prize money from that event was deleted from their ranking. After the tournament, the top 64 in the PDC Order of Merit received a one-year extension on their tour card. Players in the final year of their tour card, or that do not hold a tour card for the 2024 season, who finished the tournament outside the top 64 lost their tour card, unless players inside the top 64 resign their tour card, which Steve Beaton did when he retired from the professional game.

=== Prize money ===
The total prize pool for the tournament remained at £2.5 million in total for the seventh year in a row. Tournament sponsors Paddy Power pledged a £60,000 bonus for a nine-dart finish hit during the tournament to each of the players, Prostate Cancer UK, and a fan in the Alexandra Palace crowd during the match it was hit. Christian Kist hit a nine-darter in his first round match against Madars Razma. Damon Heta hit the second nine-darter of the tournament in his third round match against Luke Woodhouse.

Position (no. of players)		Prize money (Total: £2,500,000)
Winner	(1)	£500,000
Runner-up	(1)	£200,000
Semi-finalists	(2)	£100,000
Quarter-finalists	(4)	£50,000
Fourth round losers	(8)	£35,000
Third round losers	(16)	£25,000
Second round losers	(32)	£15,000
First round losers	(32)	£7,500
Nine-dart finish	(2)	£60,000

== Qualification ==
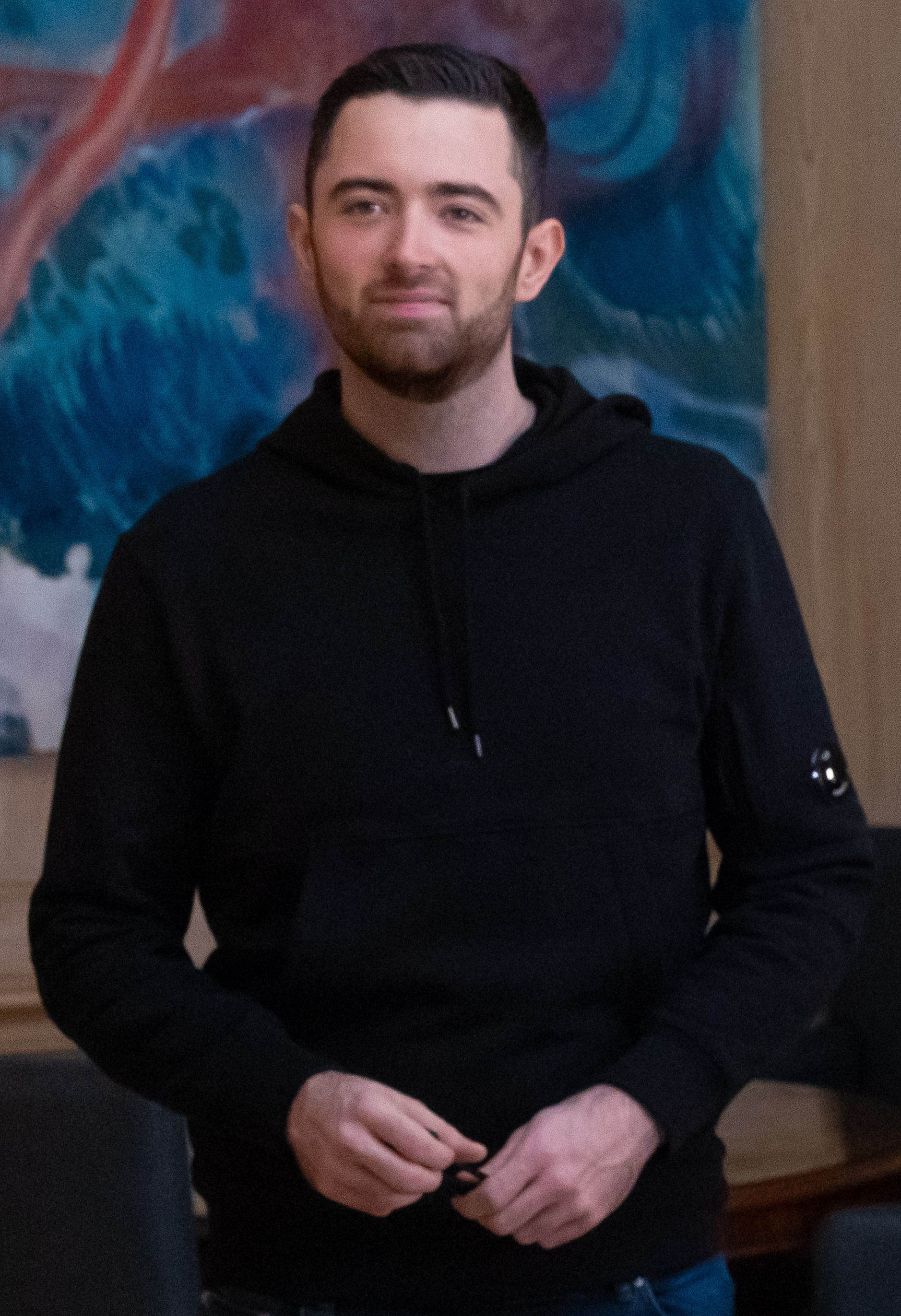
Luke Humphries was defending champion and number one seed going in to the tournament.

96 players competed in the event, with the thirty-two highest ranked players on the PDC Order of Merit being seeded to the second round. The top 32 not yet qualified players from the 2024 PDC Pro Tour Order of Merit and the 32 international qualifiers entered in the first round.

=== Seeds ===
Luke Humphries, the reigning 2024 PDC World Champion, the World Matchplay, and Players Championship Finals champion, and the Premier League, UK Open, and World Grand Prix runner-up was top of the two-year Order of Merit and number one seed going into the tournament. The 2023 world champion and 2024 World Series Finals runner-up Michael Smith was the second seed. Michael van Gerwen, the 2014, 2017 and 2019 PDC World Champion and 2024 Masters and World Matchplay runner-up was the third seed. Luke Littler, the 2024 Premier League, Grand Slam and World Series Finals champion, and the runner-up at the 2024 PDC World Championship and Players Championship Finals was the fourth seed. 2018 world champion, Rob Cross, was the fifth seed.

As well as Humphries, Smith, van Gerwen and Cross, four other previous PDC world champions qualified as seeds: 2021 world champion Gerwyn Price was the tenth seed, 2015 and 2016 world champion Gary Anderson was seeded fourteenth, 2020 and 2022 world champion Peter Wright was the seventeenth seed, and 2007 world champion Raymond van Barneveld was the thirty-second seed. 2014 BDO World Champion and 2024 Masters champion Stephen Bunting was the eighth seed. He was one of two former BDO world champions to qualify as seeds, alongside 1998, 1999, 2003, and 2005 BDO world champion van Barneveld.

The top seeds behind Humphries, Smith, van Gerwen, Littler and Cross were Dave Chisnall, 2023 World Matchplay runner-up Jonny Clayton, Bunting, 2024 UK Open semi-finalist Damon Heta, Price, 2024 UK Open champion Dimitri Van den Bergh, 2023 World Matchplay champion Nathan Aspinall, 2022 UK Open champion Danny Noppert, Anderson, 2023 Masters champion Chris Dobey and 2023 European Championship runner-up James Wade. Other tournament winners to qualify as seeds were 2022 European Champion Ross Smith as the nineteenth seed, 2023 UK Open champion Andrew Gilding as the twenty-first seed, 2022 Masters champion Joe Cullen as the twenty-third seed, 2024 World Grand Prix champion Mike De Decker as the twenty-fourth seed, 2018 Players Championship Finals champion Daryl Gurney as twenty-seventh seed and 2024 European Champion Ritchie Edhouse as the twenty-ninth seed. Edhouse had previously led the non–seeded Pro Tour Order of Merit qualifiers prior to his major win. The 2023 World Championship semi-finalist Gabriel Clemens qualified as twenty-seventh seed, while 2024 World Youth Champion Gian van Veen was the twenty-eighth seed and 2024 quarter-finalist Brendan Dolan was the thirtieth seed.

=== Pro Tour qualification ===
Cameron Menzies was the highest-ranked non-seed on the 2024 PDC Pro Tour Order of Merit and one of four Pro Tour event winners in 2024 to qualify via the Pro Tour, alongside Wessel Nijman, Wesley Plaisier and Alan Soutar. Two players who were runners-up in PDC majors in 2024 qualified via the Pro Tour, Jermaine Wattimena at the 2024 European Championship and Martin Lukeman at the Grand Slam.

Other players qualifying via the 2024 Pro Tour included event winners from 2023 Ricardo Pietreczko, Ryan Joyce, Callan Rydz and Kim Huybrechts as well as 2024 UK Open semi-finalist and 2024 Pro Tour event runner-up Ricky Evans.

2024 World Championship semi-finalist and 2022 Pro Tour event winner Scott Williams also qualified alongside Connor Scutt, the 2024 Challenge Tour Order of Merit winner, and a Pro Tour event runner-up in both the 2023 and 2024 seasons. Scutt and Wesley Plaisier also qualified for the 2024 WDF World Darts Championship but withdrew in order to play at the Alexandra Palace.

Jeffrey de Graaf, a 2024 Pro Tour event runner-up, qualified via both the 2024 Pro Tour and the PDC Nordic and Baltic circuit but was drawn as a Pro Tour qualifier.

Other players qualifying via their Pro Tour ranking included 2024 European Championship semi-finalist Luke Woodhouse, 2017 Champions League of Darts winner Mensur Suljović, 13-time PDC ranking event winner Ian White and 2024 Grand Slam semi-finalist Mickey Mansell.

Plaisier and James Hurrell made their PDC World Darts Championship debuts.

=== International qualifiers ===
Niko Springer and Keane Barry qualified from the 2024 PDC Development Tour series, while 2012 BDO World Champion Christian Kist and Alexander Merkx qualified from the 2024 PDC Challenge Tour series.

Fallon Sherrock, the only woman to have won a match at the PDC World Darts Championship, and Noa-Lynn van Leuven qualified from the 2024 PDC Women's Series, with Van Leuven becoming the first transgender competitor to play at the event. As with the previous edition, no player was eligible to compete in the 2025 PDC World Championship had they played at the 2024 WDF World Championship which concluded a week earlier. Beau Greaves, the winner of the 2024 Women's World Matchplay, qualified but opted to play the WDF event.

Rashad Sweeting became the first player from the Bahamas to play at the PDC World Championship after sealing his qualification through the Championship Darts Latin America and Caribbean Order of Merit, while Stefan Bellmont became the first Swiss player to play at the PDC World Championship.

The final places were awarded by a qualifier for non-qualified PDC Tour Card holders, with Rhys Griffin, Jeffrey de Zwaan, Dylan Slevin and Matt Campbell progressing through the qualifier.

Debutants from the international qualifiers were Ryusei Azemoto, Stefan Bellmont, Joe Comito, Kai Gotthardt, Romeo Grbavac, Rhys Griffin, Lok Yin Lee, Alexander Merkx, Niko Springer, Rashad Sweeting, Alexis Toylo and Noa-Lynn van Leuven.

List of international qualifying events
Event	Dates	Position	Qualifier
North American Championship	1 June	Champion	~~Matt Campbell~~ (Note: Campbell was ineligible to qualify through a regional qualifier as he is in the third year of his tour card. His spot was reallocated to the CDC tour.)
Women's World Matchplay	21 July	Champion	~~Beau Greaves~~ (Note: Greaves chose to play the 2024 WDF World Darts Championship following a ruling by the PDC which did not allow players to compete in both World Championships in the same year. Her spot was reallocated to the PDC Tour Card Holders qualifier.)
China Championship	18 August	Winner	Xiaochen Zong
PDCNB ProTour	16 February – 25 August	Winner	Jeffrey de Graaf
PDCNB ProTour	16 February – 25 August	Runner-Up	Darius Labanauskas
Japan Tour	27 April – 8 September	Winner	Tomoya Goto
DPA ProTour	10 Feb – 14 Sep	Champion	Joe Comito
CDC Main Tour	18 May – 22 September	Top American	Leonard Gates
CDC Main Tour	18 May – 22 September	Top Canadian	Jim Long
CDC Main Tour	18 May – 22 September	Top-Ranked Non-Qualified	Stowe Buntz
African Darts Group Qualifier	29 September	Winner	Cameron Carolissen
Asian Tour	13 January – 6 October	Winner	Alexis Toylo
Asian Tour	13 January – 6 October	Runner-Up	Lourence Ilagan
Asian Tour	13 January – 6 October	Third Place	Paolo Nebrida
Asian Tour	13 January – 6 October	Fourth Place	Ryusei Azemoto
DPNZ Qualifier	7 October	Winner	Ben Robb
CLDC Tour	20 July – 6 October	Winner	Rashad Sweeting
Development Tour	23 February – 13 October	Winner	Wessel Nijman
Development Tour	23 February – 13 October	Runner-Up	Niko Springer
Development Tour	23 February – 13 October	Third Place	Keane Barry
Asian Championship	19–20 October	Winner	Lourence Ilagan
Asian Championship	19–20 October	Runner-Up	Sandro Eric Sosing
Asian Championship	19–20 October	Top-Ranked Semi-Finalist	Lok Yin Lee
DPA Oceanic Masters	20 October	Winner	Gordon Mathers
Women's Series	23 March – 20 October	Winner	Beau Greaves
Women's Series	23 March – 20 October	Runner-Up	Noa-Lynn van Leuven
Women's Series	23 March – 20 October	Third Place	Fallon Sherrock
Indian Qualifier	27–28 October	Winner	Nitin Kumar
Challenge Tour	19 January – 3 November	Winner	Connor Scutt
Challenge Tour	19 January – 3 November	Runner-Up	Wesley Plaisier
Challenge Tour	19 January – 3 November	Third Place	Christian Kist
Challenge Tour	19 January – 3 November	Fourth Place	Alexander Merkx
PDC Europe Superleague	7–8 November	Champion	Kai Gotthardt
West Europe Qualifier	16 November	Winner	Stefan Bellmont
World Youth Championship	14 Oct – 24 Nov	Champion	Gian van Veen (Note: Van Veen also qualified as the winner of the 2024 PDC World Youth Championship. His second qualifying spot was reallocated to the PDC Tour Card Holders qualifier.)
East Europe Qualifier	24 November	Winner	Romeo Grbavac
PDPA Tour Card Holder Qualifier	25 November	Last Four	Rhys Griffin
PDPA Tour Card Holder Qualifier	25 November	Last Four	Jeffrey de Zwaan
PDPA Tour Card Holder Qualifier	25 November	Last Four	Dylan Slevin
PDPA Tour Card Holder Qualifier	25 November	Last Four	Matt Campbell

=== List of qualifiers ===
Order of Merit
Second round (seeded)

1. Luke Humphries (fourth round)
2. Michael Smith (second round)
3. Michael van Gerwen (runner-up)
4. Luke Littler (champion)
5. Rob Cross (second round)
6. Dave Chisnall (second round)
7. Jonny Clayton (fourth round)
8. Stephen Bunting (semi-finals)
9. Damon Heta (third round)
10. Gerwyn Price (quarter-finals)
11. Dimitri Van den Bergh (third round)
12. Nathan Aspinall (quarter-finals)
13. Danny Noppert (second round)
14. Gary Anderson (second round)
15. Chris Dobey (semi-finals)
16. James Wade (second round)
17. Peter Wright (quarter-finals)
18. Josh Rock (third round)
19. Ross Smith (second round)
20. Ryan Searle (third round)
21. Andrew Gilding (third round)
22. Martin Schindler (second round)
23. Joe Cullen (third round)
24. Mike De Decker (second round)
25. Dirk van Duijvenbode (second round)
26. Daryl Gurney (third round)
27. Gabriel Clemens (second round)
28. Gian van Veen (second round)
29. Ritchie Edhouse (second round)
30. Brendan Dolan (third round)
31. Krzysztof Ratajski (third round)
32. Raymond van Barneveld (second round)

Pro Tour Order of Merit
First round

1. Cameron Menzies (first round)
2. Wessel Nijman (second round)
3. Jermaine Wattimena (third round)
4. Ricardo Pietreczko (fourth round)
5. Luke Woodhouse (fourth round)
6. Ryan Joyce (fourth round)
7. Niels Zonneveld (first round)
8. Alan Soutar (first round)
9. Madars Razma (third round)
10. Callan Rydz (quarter-finals)
11. Wesley Plaisier (second round)
12. Martin Lukeman (second round)
13. Kevin Doets (fourth round)
14. Richard Veenstra (first round)
15. Scott Williams (third round)
16. Kim Huybrechts (first round)
17. William O'Connor (first round)
18. Karel Sedláček (first round)
19. Stephen Burton (first round)
20. Thibault Tricole (second round)
21. Connor Scutt (second round)
22. Mensur Suljović (first round)
23. Ian White (third round)
24. Jim Williams (first round)
25. Florian Hempel (second round)
26. Ryan Meikle (second round)
27. Chris Landman (first round)
28. Nick Kenny (third round)
29. James Hurrell (second round)
30. Mickey Mansell (second round)
31. Ricky Evans (third round)
32. Robert Owen (Note: Dom Taylor, who was originally 17th on the Pro Tour list, was suspended by the Darts Regulation Authority following the failure of a drugs test. Robert Owen was his replacement as the highest ranked Pro Tour player not yet qualified. He was treated as an international qualifier in the draw due to Jeffrey de Graaf's Pro Tour ranking.) (fourth round)

International Qualifiers
First round

- Ryusei Azemoto – PDC Asian Tour (first round)
- Keane Barry – PDC Development Tour (second round)
- Stefan Bellmont – West Europe Qualifier (first round)
- Stowe Buntz – CDC Pro Tour (first round)
- Matt Campbell – PDC TCH Qualifier (second round)
- Cameron Carolissen – African Qualifier (first round)
- Joe Comito – DPA Pro Tour (first round)
- Leonard Gates – CDC Pro Tour (second round)
- Tomoya Goto – PDJ Japan Tour (first round)
- Kai Gotthardt – PDC Europe Super League (second round)
- Jeffrey de Graaf – PDC Nordic & Baltic (Note: De Graaf was ranked in the top 32 on the Pro Tour list, so was treated as a ProTour qualifier in the draw.) (fourth round)
- Romeo Grbavac – East Europe Qualifier (first round)
- ~~Beau Greaves – Women's World Matchplay~~ (declined)
- Rhys Griffin – PDC TCH Qualifier (second round)
- Lourence Ilagan – PDC Asian Tour (first round)
- Christian Kist – PDC Challenge Tour (first round)
- Nitin Kumar – India Qualifier (first round)
- Darius Labanauskas – PDC Nordic & Baltic (first round)
- Lok Yin Lee – PDC Asian Championship Qualifier (second round)
- Noa-Lynn van Leuven – PDC Women's Series (first round)
- Jim Long – CDC Pro Tour (first round)
- Gordon Mathers – Oceanic Masters (first round)
- Alexander Merkx – PDC Challenge Tour (second round)
- Paolo Nebrida – PDC Asian Tour (third round)
- Ben Robb – DPNZ Qualifier (first round)
- Fallon Sherrock – PDC Women's Series (first round)
- Dylan Slevin – PDC TCH Qualifier (second round)
- Sandro Eric Sosing – Asian Championship (first round – withdrew) (Note: Sosing withdrew from his round 1 match with Ian White on medical grounds. He was subsequently diagnosed with Guillain-Barré syndrome.)
- Niko Springer – PDC Development Tour (first round)
- Rashad Sweeting – CDLC Tour (first round)
- Alexis Toylo – PDC Asian Tour (second round)
- Xiaochen Zong – PDC China Championship (first round)
- Jeffrey de Zwaan – PDC TCH Qualifier (first round)

== Summary ==
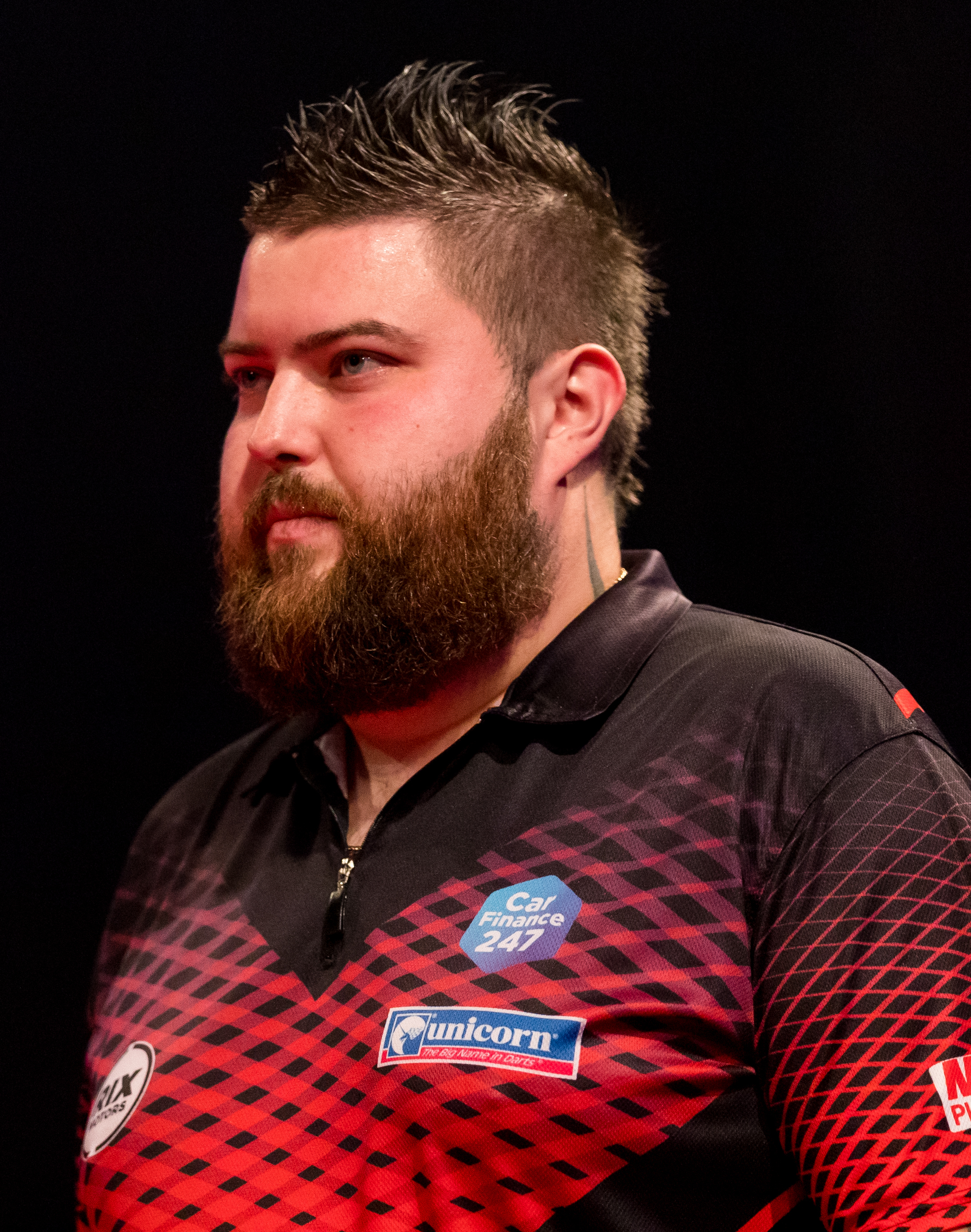
Former champion Michael Smith was the highest seeded player to be eliminated in his first match.

=== Opening rounds ===
The tournament began on 15 December, with defending champion Luke Humphries defeating Frenchman Thibault Tricole 3–0 in his opening match. Second seed and former champion Michael Smith became the highest-ranked player to fail to make it through the second round, losing 3–2 to Kevin Doets. Smith was one of four former world champions not to win their opening match, being joined by Rob Cross, who lost 3–1 to Scott Williams, Gary Anderson who was beaten 3–0 by Jeffrey de Graaf and Raymond van Barneveld who lost 3–1 to Nick Kenny.

Two major champions from the 2024 season also failed to win a match, 2024 World Grand Prix winner Mike De Decker being beaten by Luke Woodhouse and 2024 European Champion Ritchie Edhouse losing 3–1 to Ian White, with White himself having received a walkover victory over Sandro Eric Sosing in the first round after the Filipino withdrew with ill health.

In total, 14 seeds were eliminated in the second round, a record for the tournament; in addition to Michael Smith, Cross, Anderson, Van Barneveld, De Decker and Edhouse, Dave Chisnall, Danny Noppert, James Wade, Ross Smith, Martin Schindler, Dirk van Duijvenbode, Gabriel Clemens and Gian van Veen all lost their first game.

Former world champions to win their opening match, in addition to Humphries, were Michael van Gerwen who defeated James Hurrell 3–0, Peter Wright who knocked out Wesley Plaisier 3–1 and Gerwyn Price who beat Keane Barry 3–0. The highest average of the tournament, was thrown by Callan Rydz in his first round victory over Romeo Grbavac, hitting a three dart average of 107.06; Rydz would go on to defeat Martin Schindler to make the third round.

In his first round defeat to Madars Razma, Christian Kist hit the first nine-dart finish at the World Championship since the 2023 tournament's final.

=== Third round ===
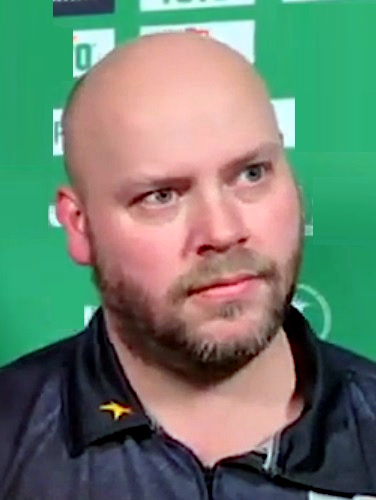
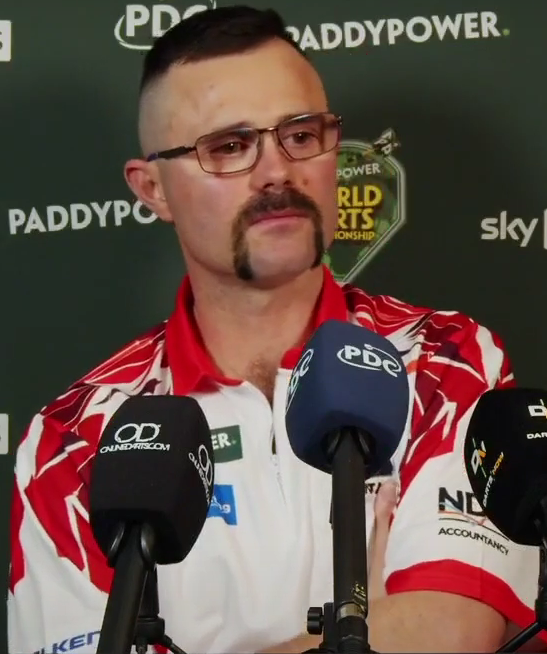
Christian Kist (left) and Damon Heta both hit nine-dart finishes during the tournament.

Callan Rydz continued to average highly in the third round, averaging 105.31 in a 4–0 win over 2024 UK Open champion Dimitri Van den Bergh. Ninth-seed Damon Heta was eliminated by a 4–3 scoreline to Luke Woodhouse, being the highest seed to be eliminated in this round despite being the second player to throw a nine-dart finish in the championship. Rydz and Woodhouse were two of seven unseeded players to make it to the fourth round, along with Ryan Joyce, Ricardo Pietreczko, Kevin Doets, Jeffrey de Graaf and Robert Owen.

Former world champion Gerwyn Price kept his hopes of regaining his crown alive with a victory over Joe Cullen, having to come through a deciding leg in the final set despite having previously held a 3–0 lead. Reigning champion Luke Humphries defeated Nick Kenny, with former world champions Michael van Gerwen and Peter Wright, and pre-tournament favourite Luke Littler also winning their third round matches.

=== Fourth round ===
Reigning champion Luke Humphries's campaign ended in the fourth round after he was defeated 4–1 by Peter Wright. Wright's fellow former world champions also qualified, with Gerwyn Price knocking out fellow Welshman Jonny Clayton 4–2 and Michael van Gerwen eliminating Jeffrey de Graaf by the same scoreline. Callan Rydz was the only unseeded player to reach the quarter-final, beating Robert Owen 4–3 to reach the second quarter final of his career.

Two other matches went the full seven sets, Luke Littler defeating Ryan Joyce to reach his second quarter-final from two attempts and Chris Dobey beating Kevin Doets to get through the fourth round for the third consecutive year. The remaining matches were won by scorelines of 4–0, with 2024 Masters champion Stephen Bunting eliminating Luke Woodhouse and Nathan Aspinall conquering a distinctly below-par Ricardo Pietreczko.

=== Quarter-finals ===
The quarter-finals were held on New Year's Day 2025. Chris Dobey played Gerwyn Price in the first quarter-final. Price won the first two sets before Dobey took control, winning four sets in a row to go one away. Price won the seventh set after Dobey missed five darts to win the match, but Dobey won the eighth set 3–1 to qualify for the first world championship semi-final of his career. In the second quarter-final Michael van Gerwen played Callan Rydz. After five sets, which were all won by the player throwing first, Van Gerwen held a 3–2 lead, before breaking Rydz's throw in the third leg of the sixth set on his way to a 3–1 victory in that set to go two sets up. Rydz, who had earlier missed a dart to win the fifth set, managed to win the seventh set against the Van Gerwen throw, but missed two darts in the deciding leg of the eighth set, allowing Van Gerwen to win that set and the match to qualify for the world championship semi-final for the ninth time of his career.

Stephen Bunting played Peter Wright in the third quarter-final. Bunting won the first four sets, including winning the fourth set 3–0 against the throw, before Wright came back and won sets five and six. Bunting secured the match victory with a 3–0 win in the seventh set to reach the second PDC world championship semi-final of his career. In the final quarter-final Luke Littler took on Nathan Aspinall. Littler got off to a strong start, winning the first set with three consecutive twelve-darters, and took the second set against the Aspinall throw. Aspinall broke back in the third set, but a Littler eleven-darter in the deciding leg of the fourth set restored the two-set advantage. Littler won the fifth set to go one away, and while Aspinall did manage to take the sixth set, another 3–0 scoreline in the seventh set ensured Littler would qualify for the semi-final for the second consecutive year.

=== Semi-finals ===
In the first semi-final, Michael van Gerwen played Chris Dobey. Van Gerwen won the first set against the throw, and took advantage of three missed darts from Dobey to also take the second. Dobey got off the mark with a 3–0 win in the third set, including a 170 checkout in the second leg, but Van Gerwen won the fourth set by the same scoreline to re-gain the two set advantage before breaking in the fifth set. Van Gerwen took the next two sets to complete a 6–1 victory to reach his seventh world championship final. Luke Littler took on Stephen Bunting in the other semi-final. Littler won the first set 3–2, before breaking in second set 3–1. The same 3–2, 3–1 pattern was repeated in the next two sets, giving Littler a 4–0 lead. Bunting broke back the fifth set with a 3–1 win, but missed 3 to win the sixth set, which Littler won 3–2 to go one away. With a 3–1 win in the seventh set Littler also completed a 6–1 win to reach the world championship final for the second time.

=== Final ===
Luke Littler took on Michael van Gerwen in the final, held on Friday January 3. Van Gerwen threw first in the opening set, but missed three darts, and lost a fourth after busting his score, to win the first leg, enabling Littler to break and eventually win the set 3–1. Littler won the second set 3–0. In the second leg of the third set Van Gerwen missed three darts to break, and Littler won that leg and the next two to go 3–0 up in the match. The third leg of the fourth set saw Van Gerwen break the Littler throw for the first time in the match – with Littler having missed two darts for the set – but in the next leg van Gerwen missed more darts and Littler broke again to cross the halfway mark towards the championship.

Van Gerwen got off the mark with a 3–1 win in the fifth set, but Littler held the sixth set to go two sets away from victory. Van Gerwen took the seventh set 3–2, but again Littler won the next set. Van Gerwen won the ninth set, but Littler broke in the second leg of the next set to set himself up to throw for the match, and a fourteen-dart leg finished on double 16 wrapped up the world championship for Littler. Aged 17, Littler became the youngest world champion in PDC history, beating the record previously held by Van Gerwen who was 24 years old when he triumphed in 2014.

== Schedule ==
Sunday, 15 December

Evening session (19:00 GMT)
Match no.	Round	Player 1	Score	Player 2	Set 1	Set 2	Set 3	Set 4	Set 5
01	1	Thibault Tricole 80.61	3–1	Joe Comito 81.25	3–1	3–2	2–3	3–2	—N/a
02	1	Jermaine Wattimena 98.54	3–0	Stefan Bellmont 92.95	3–1	3–1	3–2	—N/a	
03	1	Kim Huybrechts 96.92	1–3	Keane Barry 94.97	3–2	2–3	1–3	1–3	—N/a
04	2	Luke Humphries 90.79	3–0	Thibault Tricole 85.62	3–0	3–0	3–0	—N/a	

Monday, 16 December

Afternoon session (12:30 GMT)
Match no.	Round	Player 1	Score	Player 2	Set 1	Set 2	Set 3	Set 4	Set 5
05	1	Wesley Plaisier 82.56	3–2	Ryusei Azemoto 79.23	1–3	3–2	1–3	3–1	3–0
06	1	Luke Woodhouse 94.38	3–0	Lourence Ilagan 81.11	3–0	3–0	3–2	—N/a	
07	1	Alan Soutar 84.19	1–3	Kai Gotthardt 89.10	3–2	1–3	0–3	2–3	—N/a
08	2	James Wade 97.01	0–3	Jermaine Wattimena 99.17	1–3	0–3	1–3	—N/a	

Evening session (19:00 GMT)
Match no.	Round	Player 1	Score	Player 2	Set 1	Set 2	Set 3	Set 4	Set 5
09	1	Niels Zonneveld 93.19	1–3	Robert Owen 91.64	3–0	2–3	1–3	2–3	—N/a
10	1	Connor Scutt 101.92	3–0	Ben Robb 82.64	3–0	3–1	3–0	—N/a	
11	1	Cameron Menzies 83.77	1–3	Leonard Gates 82.96	0–3	3–2	0–3	2–3	—N/a
12	2	Gerwyn Price 91.32	3–0	Keane Barry 86.81	3–0	3–1	3–1	—N/a	

Tuesday, 17 December

Afternoon session (12:30 GMT)
Match no.	Round	Player 1	Score	Player 2	Set 1	Set 2	Set 3	Set 4	Set 5
13	1	James Hurrell 88.75	3–0	Jim Long 79.17	3–0	3–1	3–0	—N/a	
14	1	Kevin Doets 88.13	3–1	Noa-Lynn van Leuven 87.02	1–3	3–1	3–1	3–2	—N/a
15	1	Ryan Joyce 92.97	3–1	Darius Labanauskas 89.62	3–0	0–3	3–1	3–1	—N/a
16	2	Mike De Decker 87.38	1–3	Luke Woodhouse 88.38	0–3	1–3	3–0	1–3	—N/a

Evening session (19:00 GMT)
Match no.	Round	Player 1	Score	Player 2	Set 1	Set 2	Set 3	Set 4	Set 5
17	1	Jeffrey de Graaf 92.30	3–1	Rashad Sweeting 82.88	1–3	3–2	3–0	3–1	—N/a
18	1	Ricardo Pietreczko 88.68	3–0	Xiaochen Zong 84.03	3–0	3–2	3–1	—N/a	
19	1	Ryan Meikle 83.53	3–2	Fallon Sherrock 81.81	0–3	3–0	3–0	2–3	3–1
20	2	Peter Wright 89.63	3–1	Wesley Plaisier 93.77	3–2	3–2	0–3	3–2	—N/a

Wednesday, 18 December

Evening session (19:00 GMT)
Match no.	Round	Player 1	Score	Player 2	Set 1	Set 2	Set 3	Set 4	Set 5
21	1	Jim Williams 94.10	2–3	Paolo Nebrida 86.63	2–3	3–1	1–3	3–0	2–3
22	1	Madars Razma 90.65	3–1	Christian Kist 94.90	2–3	3–1	3–1	3–2	—N/a
23	1	Ricky Evans 86.23	3–2	Gordon Mathers 87.57	3–1	0–3	3–1	1–3	3–1
24	2	Nathan Aspinall 88.03	3–1	Leonard Gates 83.41	3–1	2–3	3–1	3–2	—N/a

Thursday, 19 December

Afternoon session (12:30 GMT)
Match no.	Round	Player 1	Score	Player 2	Set 1	Set 2	Set 3	Set 4	Set 5
25	1	Chris Landman 80.71	1–3	Lok Yin Lee 84.40	3–2	0–3	0–3	0–3	—N/a
26	1	Callan Rydz 107.06	3–0	Romeo Grbavac 97.92	3–0	3–1	3–1	—N/a	
27	1	Martin Lukeman 86.66	3–1	Nitin Kumar 85.77	2–3	3–1	3–1	3–1	—N/a
28	2	Gabriel Clemens 92.39	1–3	Robert Owen 98.97	2–3	0–3	3–1	1–3	—N/a

Evening session (19:00 GMT)
Match no.	Round	Player 1	Score	Player 2	Set 1	Set 2	Set 3	Set 4	Set 5
29	1	Nick Kenny 87.66	3–0	Stowe Buntz 87.26	3–1	3–2	3–1	—N/a	
30	1	Mensur Suljović 88.44	2–3	Matt Campbell 93.31	2–3	3–2	0–3	3–2	0–3
31	1	Scott Williams 96.24	3–1	Niko Springer 98.92	0–3	3–1	3–1	3–2	—N/a
32	2	Michael Smith 96.93	2–3	Kevin Doets 96.90	3–0	1–3	3–0	0–3	4–6

Friday, 20 December

Afternoon session (12:30 GMT)
Match no.	Round	Player 1	Score	Player 2	Set 1	Set 2	Set 3	Set 4	Set 5
33	1	Stephen Burton 75.63	0–3	Alexander Merkx 78.41	1–3	1–3	2–3	—N/a	
34	1	Wessel Nijman 94.83	3–2	Cameron Carolissen 95.90	3–0	3–2	0–3	2–3	3–2
35	1	Ian White	w/o	Sandro Eric Sosing	—N/a				
36	2	Stephen Bunting 92.12	3–1	Kai Gotthardt 89.40	1–3	3–2	3–0	3–0	—N/a

Evening session (19:00 GMT)
Match no.	Round	Player 1	Score	Player 2	Set 1	Set 2	Set 3	Set 4	Set 5
37	1	Mickey Mansell 81.34	3–1	Tomoya Goto 82.22	3–1	3–2	2–3	3–2	—N/a
38	1	Florian Hempel 92.73	3–1	Jeffrey de Zwaan 94.36	3–1	3–0	1–3	3–1	—N/a
39	1	William O'Connor 85.92	1–3	Dylan Slevin 86.35	2–3	1–3	3–1	2–3	—N/a
40	2	Michael van Gerwen 94.85	3–0	James Hurrell 89.32	3–1	3–1	3–1	—N/a	

Saturday, 21 December

Afternoon session (12:30 GMT)
Match no.	Round	Player 1	Score	Player 2	Set 1	Set 2	Set 3	Set 4	Set 5
41	1	Karel Sedláček 82.58	0–3	Rhys Griffin 91.10	2–3	2–3	0–3	—N/a	
42	1	Richard Veenstra 86.00	0–3	Alexis Toylo 86.03	2–3	2–3	2–3	—N/a	
43	2	Brendan Dolan 92.02	3–0	Lok Yin Lee 83.20	3–2	3–0	3–1	—N/a	
44	2	Chris Dobey 95.62	3–1	Alexander Merkx 90.54	3–1	3–0	0–3	3–1	—N/a

Evening session (19:00 GMT)
Match no.	Round	Player 1	Score	Player 2	Set 1	Set 2	Set 3	Set 4	Set 5
45	2	Danny Noppert 93.91	1–3	Ryan Joyce 93.88	3–1	2–3	1–3	2–3	—N/a
46	2	Raymond van Barneveld 84.64	1–3	Nick Kenny 86.39	1–3	2–3	3–0	2–3	—N/a
47	2	Luke Littler 100.85	3–1	Ryan Meikle 91.93	3–2	1–3	3–1	3–0	—N/a
48	2	Damon Heta 97.96	3–1	Connor Scutt 98.47	2–3	3–0	3–2	3–0	—N/a

Sunday, 22 December

Afternoon session (12:30 GMT)
Match no.	Round	Player 1	Score	Player 2	Set 1	Set 2	Set 3	Set 4	Set 5
49	2	Ryan Searle 99.38	3–0	Matt Campbell 90.66	3–1	3–0	3–0	—N/a	
50	2	Dirk van Duijvenbode 88.72	1–3	Madars Razma 91.33	3–0	2–3	0–3	2–3	—N/a
51	2	Joe Cullen 98.18	3–0	Wessel Nijman 98.01	3–1	3–2	3–1	—N/a	
52	2	Ritchie Edhouse 84.19	1–3	Ian White 88.86	3–1	1–3	1–3	1–3	—N/a

Evening session (19:00 GMT)
Match no.	Round	Player 1	Score	Player 2	Set 1	Set 2	Set 3	Set 4	Set 5
53	2	Martin Schindler 89.37	0–3	Callan Rydz 91.05	2–3	1–3	0–3	—N/a	
54	2	Ross Smith 89.79	0–3	Paolo Nebrida 91.07	2–3	2–3	2–3	—N/a	
55	2	Gary Anderson 92.51	0–3	Jeffrey de Graaf 95.56	1–3	0–3	2–3	—N/a	
56	2	Dimitri Van den Bergh 96.00	3–0	Dylan Slevin 95.02	3–2	3–2	3–2	—N/a	

Monday, 23 December

Afternoon session (12:30 GMT)
Match no.	Round	Player 1	Score	Player 2	Set 1	Set 2	Set 3	Set 4	Set 5
57	2	Krzysztof Ratajski 95.32	3–1	Alexis Toylo 96.39	3–1	3–2	2–3	3–1	—N/a
58	2	Andrew Gilding 92.65	3–1	Martin Lukeman 91.28	3–0	0–3	3–2	3–2	—N/a
59	2	Josh Rock 87.13	3–0	Rhys Griffin 85.99	3–0	3–2	3–0	—N/a	
60	2	Jonny Clayton 92.45	3–2	Mickey Mansell 84.26	2–3	3–0	3–0	1–3	6–5

Evening session (19:00 GMT)
Match no.	Round	Player 1	Score	Player 2	Set 1	Set 2	Set 3	Set 4	Set 5
61	2	Gian van Veen 91.99	1–3	Ricardo Pietreczko 91.64	0–3	3–1	0–3	1–3	—N/a
62	2	Daryl Gurney 98.31	3–2	Florian Hempel 96.44	1–3	3–1	0–3	3–2	3–1
63	2	Dave Chisnall 94.54	2–3	Ricky Evans 94.30	3–1	2–3	1–3	3–0	5–6
64	2	Rob Cross 88.64	1–3	Scott Williams 87.90	3–2	2–3	1–3	2–3	—N/a

Friday, 27 December

Afternoon session (12:30 GMT)
Match no.	Round	Player 1	Score	Player 2	Set 1	Set 2	Set 3	Set 4	Set 5	Set 6	Set 7
65	3	Damon Heta 89.69	3–4	Luke Woodhouse 92.34	2–3	3–1	3–2	3–2	1–3	0–3	0–3
66	3	Jonny Clayton 90.11	4–3	Daryl Gurney 92.60	3–2	3–1	3–0	1–3	0–3	1–3	3–1
67	3	Stephen Bunting 100.06	4–1	Madars Razma 90.92	3–1	3–0	2–3	3–0	3–2	—N/a	

Evening session (19:00 GMT)
Match no.	Round	Player 1	Score	Player 2	Set 1	Set 2	Set 3	Set 4	Set 5	Set 6	Set 7
68	3	Gerwyn Price 92.60	4–3	Joe Cullen 92.77	3–2	3–2	3–1	1–3	1–3	1–3	6–5
69	3	Jermaine Wattimena 96.50	2–4	Peter Wright 96.19	1–3	0–3	3–2	0–3	3–0	1–3	—N/a
70	3	Luke Humphries 98.59	4–0	Nick Kenny 93.42	3–2	3–1	3–1	3–0	—N/a		

Saturday, 28 December

Afternoon session (12:30 GMT)
Match no.	Round	Player 1	Score	Player 2	Set 1	Set 2	Set 3	Set 4	Set 5	Set 6	Set 7
71	3	Ryan Joyce 97.40	4–3	Ryan Searle 100.97	3–2	3–2	1–3	2–3	3–0	2–3	4–2
72	3	Scott Williams 94.29	1–4	Ricardo Pietreczko 97.00	2–3	1–3	3–1	0–3	2–3	—N/a	
73	3	Nathan Aspinall 92.17	4–0	Andrew Gilding 86.65	3–1	3–2	3–2	3–1	—N/a		

Evening session (19:00 GMT)
Match no.	Round	Player 1	Score	Player 2	Set 1	Set 2	Set 3	Set 4	Set 5	Set 6	Set 7
74	3	Chris Dobey 97.29	4–2	Josh Rock 95.99	1–3	3–1	1–3	3–0	3–2	3–1	—N/a
75	3	Michael van Gerwen 97.01	4–2	Brendan Dolan 96.08	2–3	3–1	3–0	3–0	1–3	3–2	—N/a
76	3	Luke Littler 97.84	4–1	Ian White 96.40	3–2	1–3	3–0	3–2	3–1	—N/a	

Sunday, 29 December

Afternoon session (12:30 GMT)
Match no.	Round	Player 1	Score	Player 2	Set 1	Set 2	Set 3	Set 4	Set 5	Set 6	Set 7
77	3	Jeffrey de Graaf 89.99	4–1	Paolo Nebrida 83.01	1–3	3–0	3–2	3–1	3–1	—N/a	
78	3	Kevin Doets 89.67	4–3	Krzysztof Ratajski 94.55	0–3	0–3	3–1	3–0	2–3	3–2	3–1
79	3	Dimitri Van den Bergh 94.79	0–4	Callan Rydz 105.31	0–3	2–3	2–3	0–3	—N/a		

Evening session (19:00 GMT)
Match no.	Round	Player 1	Score	Player 2	Set 1	Set 2	Set 3	Set 4	Set 5	Set 6	Set 7
80	3	Ricky Evans 86.84	2–4	Robert Owen 92.92	3–1	2–3	3–2	2–3	2–3	0–3	—N/a
81	4	Jonny Clayton 91.73	2–4	Gerwyn Price 92.28	1–3	1–3	3–0	3–1	1–3	1–3	—N/a
82	4	Luke Humphries 99.23	1–4	Peter Wright 100.93	2–3	3–2	2–3	2–3	0–3	—N/a	

Monday, 30 December

Afternoon session (12:30 GMT)
Match no.	Round	Player 1	Score	Player 2	Set 1	Set 2	Set 3	Set 4	Set 5	Set 6	Set 7
83	4	Kevin Doets 88.17	3–4	Chris Dobey 91.59	1–3	3–1	0–3	3–2	3–2	1–3	1–3
84	4	Robert Owen 94.07	3–4	Callan Rydz 97.38	3–1	3–2	2–3	0–3	0–3	3–1	1–3
85	4	Ricardo Pietreczko 78.46	0–4	Nathan Aspinall 94.28	1–3	0–3	0–3	1–3	—N/a		

Evening session (19:00 GMT)
Match no.	Round	Player 1	Score	Player 2	Set 1	Set 2	Set 3	Set 4	Set 5	Set 6	Set 7
86	4	Stephen Bunting 96.78	4–0	Luke Woodhouse 90.61	3–0	3–1	3–1	3–1	—N/a		
87	4	Michael van Gerwen 101.98	4–2	Jeffrey de Graaf 91.85	3–1	3–0	0–3	1–3	3–0	3–0	—N/a
88	4	Luke Littler 103.14	4–3	Ryan Joyce 97.73	3–1	2–3	3–1	1–3	3–1	2–3	3–1

Wednesday, 1 January

Afternoon session (12:30 GMT)
Match no.	Round	Player 1	Score	Player 2	Set 1	Set 2	Set 3	Set 4	Set 5	Set 6	Set 7	Set 8
89	QF	Chris Dobey 95.38	5–3	Gerwyn Price 92.74	2–3	1–3	3–1	3–2	3–2	3–0	2–3	3–1
90	QF	Michael van Gerwen 103.10	5–3	Callan Rydz 103.88	3–2	0–3	3–2	1–3	3–2	3–1	1–3	3–2

Evening session (19:00 GMT)
Match no.	Round	Player 1	Score	Player 2	Set 1	Set 2	Set 3	Set 4	Set 5	Set 6	Set 7
91	QF	Peter Wright 92.41	2–5	Stephen Bunting 95.55	1–3	1–3	2–3	0–3	3–0	3–1	0–3
92	QF	Luke Littler 101.54	5–2	Nathan Aspinall 96.31	3–0	3–1	2–3	3–2	3–1	2–3	3–0

Thursday, 2 January

Match no.	Round	Player 1	Score	Player 2	Set 1	Set 2	Set 3	Set 4	Set 5	Set 6	Set 7
93	SF	Chris Dobey 94.77	1–6	Michael van Gerwen 98.84	1–3	2–3	3–0	0–3	1–3	2–3	1–3
94	SF	Stephen Bunting 100.10	1–6	Luke Littler 105.48	2–3	1–3	2–3	1–3	3–1	2–3	1–3

Friday, 3 January

Evening session (19:30 GMT)
Match no.	Round	Player 1	Score	Player 2	Set 1	Set 2	Set 3	Set 4	Set 5	Set 6	Set 7	Set 8	Set 9	Set 10
95	F	Luke Littler 102.73	7–3	Michael van Gerwen 100.69	3–1	3–0	3–1	3–1	1–3	3–2	2–3	3–0	1–3	3–0

== Draw ==
The draw took place on 25 November 2024, live on Sky Sports News, and was conducted by Sky Sports presenter, Emma Paton, and former semi-finalists Wayne Mardle and Mark Webster.

=== Finals ===
Quarter-finals (best of 9 sets); 1 January
17	Peter Wright 92.41	2
8	Stephen Bunting 95.55	5
4	Luke Littler 101.54	5
12	Nathan Aspinall 96.31	2
15	Chris Dobey 95.38	5
10	Gerwyn Price 92.74	3
3	Michael van Gerwen 103.10	5
Callan Rydz 103.88	3

Semi-finals (best of 11 sets); 2 January
8	Stephen Bunting 100.10	1
4	Luke Littler 105.48	6
15	Chris Dobey 94.77	1
3	Michael van Gerwen 98.84	6

Final (best of 13 sets); 3 January
4	Luke Littler 102.73	7
3	Michael van Gerwen 100.69	3

=== Top half ===
==== Section 1 ====
First round (best of 5 sets); 15–21 December
Thibault Tricole 80.61	3
Q	Joe Comito 81.25	1
Nick Kenny 87.66	3
Q	Stowe Buntz 87.26	0
Jermaine Wattimena 98.54	3
Q	Stefan Bellmont 92.95	0
Wesley Plaisier 82.56	3
Q	Ryusei Azemoto 79.23	2
Alan Soutar 84.19	1
Q	Kai Gotthardt 89.10	3
Madars Razma 90.65	3
Q	Christian Kist 94.90	1
Connor Scutt 101.92	3
Q	Ben Robb 82.64	0
Luke Woodhouse 94.38	3
Q	Lourence Ilagan 81.11	0

Second round (best of 5 sets); 15–23 December
1	Luke Humphries 90.79	3
Thibault Tricole 85.62	0
32	Raymond van Barneveld 84.64	1
Nick Kenny 86.39	3
16	James Wade 97.01	0
Jermaine Wattimena 99.17	3
17	Peter Wright 89.63	3
Wesley Plaisier 93.77	1
8	Stephen Bunting 92.12	3
Q	Kai Gotthardt 89.40	1
25	Dirk van Duijvenbode 88.72	1
Madars Razma 91.33	3
9	Damon Heta 97.96	3
Connor Scutt 98.47	1
24	Mike De Decker 87.38	1
Luke Woodhouse 88.38	3

Third round (best of 7 sets); 27–29 December
1	Luke Humphries 98.59	4
Nick Kenny 93.42	0
Jermaine Wattimena 96.50	2
17	Peter Wright 96.19	4
8	Stephen Bunting 100.06	4
Madars Razma 90.92	1
9	Damon Heta 89.69	3
Luke Woodhouse 92.34	4

Fourth round (best of 7 sets); 29–30 December
1	Luke Humphries 99.23	1
17	Peter Wright 100.93	4
8	Stephen Bunting 96.78	4
Luke Woodhouse 90.61	0

Quarter-finals (best of 9 sets); 1 January
17	Peter Wright 92.41	2
8	Stephen Bunting 95.55	5

==== Section 2 ====
First round (best of 5 sets); 15–21 December
Ryan Meikle 83.53	3
Q	Fallon Sherrock 81.81	2
Ian White	w/o
Q	Sandro Eric Sosing	w/d
Ryan Joyce 92.97	3
Q	Darius Labanauskas 89.62	1
Mensur Suljović 88.44	2
Q	Matt Campbell 93.31	3
Scott Williams 96.24	3
Q	Niko Springer 98.92	1
Ricardo Pietreczko 88.68	3
Q	Xiaochen Zong 84.03	0
Cameron Menzies 83.77	1
Q	Leonard Gates 82.96	3
Martin Lukeman 86.66	3
Q	Nitin Kumar 85.77	1

Second round (best of 5 sets); 15–23 December
4	Luke Littler 100.85	3
Ryan Meikle 91.93	1
29	Ritchie Edhouse 84.19	1
Ian White 88.86	3
13	Danny Noppert 93.91	1
Ryan Joyce 93.88	3
20	Ryan Searle 99.38	3
Q	Matt Campbell 90.66	0
5	Rob Cross 88.64	1
Scott Williams 87.90	3
28	Gian van Veen 91.99	1
Ricardo Pietreczko 91.64	3
12	Nathan Aspinall 88.03	3
Q	Leonard Gates 83.41	1
21	Andrew Gilding 92.65	3
Martin Lukeman 91.28	1

Third round (best of 7 sets); 27–29 December
4	Luke Littler 97.84	4
Ian White 96.40	1
Ryan Joyce 97.40	4
20	Ryan Searle 100.97	3
Scott Williams 94.29	1
Ricardo Pietreczko 97.00	4
12	Nathan Aspinall 92.17	4
21	Andrew Gilding 86.85	0

Fourth round (best of 7 sets); 29–30 December
4	Luke Littler 103.14	4
Ryan Joyce 97.73	3
Ricardo Pietreczko 78.46	0
12	Nathan Aspinall 94.28	4

Quarter-finals (best of 9 sets); 1 January
4	Luke Littler 101.54	5
12	Nathan Aspinall 96.31	2

=== Bottom half ===
==== Section 3 ====
First round (best of 5 sets); 15–21 December
Kevin Doets 88.13	3
Q	Noa-Lynn van Leuven 87.02	1
Richard Veenstra 86.00	0
Q	Alexis Toylo 86.03	3
Stephen Burton 75.63	0
Q	Alexander Merkx 78.41	3
Karel Sedláček 82.58	0
Q	Rhys Griffin 91.10	3
Mickey Mansell 81.34	3
Q	Tomoya Goto 82.22	1
Florian Hempel 92.73	3
Q	Jeffrey de Zwaan 94.36	1
Kim Huybrechts 96.92	1
Q	Keane Barry 94.97	3
Wessel Nijman 94.83	3
Q	Cameron Carolissen 95.90	2

Second round (best of 5 sets); 15–23 December
2	Michael Smith 96.93	2
Kevin Doets 96.90	3
31	Krzysztof Ratajski 95.32	3
Q	Alexis Toylo 96.39	1
15	Chris Dobey 95.62	3
Q	Alexander Merkx 90.54	1
18	Josh Rock 87.13	3
Q	Rhys Griffin 85.99	0
7	Jonny Clayton 92.45	3
Mickey Mansell 84.26	2
26	Daryl Gurney 98.31	3
Florian Hempel 96.44	2
10	Gerwyn Price 91.32	3
Q	Keane Barry 86.81	0
23	Joe Cullen 98.18	3
Wessel Nijman 98.01	0

Third round (best of 7 sets); 27–29 December
Kevin Doets 89.67	4
31	Krzysztof Ratajski 94.55	3
15	Chris Dobey 97.29	4
18	Josh Rock 95.99	2
7	Jonny Clayton 90.11	4
26	Daryl Gurney 92.60	3
10	Gerwyn Price 92.60	4
23	Joe Cullen 92.77	3

Fourth round (best of 7 sets); 29–30 December
Kevin Doets 88.17	3
15	Chris Dobey 91.59	4
7	Jonny Clayton 91.73	2
10	Gerwyn Price 92.28	4

Quarter-finals (best of 9 sets); 1 January
15	Chris Dobey 95.38	5
10	Gerwyn Price 92.74	3

==== Section 4 ====
First round (best of 5 sets); 15–21 December
James Hurrell 88.75	3
Q	Jim Long 79.17	0
Chris Landman 80.71	1
Q	Lok Yin Lee 84.40	3
Jeffrey de Graaf 92.30	3
Q	Rashad Sweeting 82.88	1
Jim Williams 94.10	2
Q	Paolo Nebrida 86.63	3
Ricky Evans 86.23	3
Q	Gordon Mathers 87.57	2
Niels Zonneveld 93.19	1
Q	Robert Owen 91.64	3
William O'Connor 85.92	1
Q	Dylan Slevin 86.35	3
Callan Rydz 107.06	3
Q	Romeo Grbavac 97.92	0

Second round (best of 5 sets); 15–23 December
3	Michael van Gerwen 94.85	3
James Hurrell 89.32	0
30	Brendan Dolan 92.02	3
Q	Lok Yin Lee 83.20	0
14	Gary Anderson 92.51	0
Jeffrey de Graaf 95.56	3
19	Ross Smith 89.79	0
Q	Paolo Nebrida 91.07	3
6	Dave Chisnall 94.54	2
Ricky Evans 94.30	3
27	Gabriel Clemens 92.39	1
Q	Robert Owen 98.97	3
11	Dimitri Van den Bergh 96.00	3
Q	Dylan Slevin 95.02	0
22	Martin Schindler 89.37	0
Callan Rydz 91.05	3

Third round (best of 7 sets); 27–29 December
3	Michael van Gerwen 97.01	4
30	Brendan Dolan 96.08	2
Jeffrey de Graaf 89.99	4
Q	Paolo Nebrida 83.01	1
Ricky Evans 86.84	2
Q	Robert Owen 92.92	4
11	Dimitri Van den Bergh 94.79	0
Callan Rydz 105.31	4

Fourth round (best of 7 sets); 29–30 December
3	Michael van Gerwen 101.98	4
Jeffrey de Graaf 91.94	2
Q	Robert Owen 94.07	3
Callan Rydz 97.38	4

Quarter-finals (best of 9 sets); 1 January
3	Michael van Gerwen 103.10	5
Callan Rydz 103.88	3

== Final ==
Best of 13 sets Referee(s): Kirk Bevins & Huw Ware; Alexandra Palace, London, England, 3 January 2025
Luke Littler	7–3	Michael van Gerwen
3–1, 3–0, 3–1, 3–1, 1–3, 3–2, 2–3, 3–0, 1–3, 3–0
102.73	Average (3 darts)	100.69
52	100+ scores	44
23	140+ scores	22
12	180 scores	13
130	Highest checkout	132
2	100+ Checkouts	1
25/45 (55.55%)	Checkout summary	14/38 (36.84%)

== Highest averages ==
This table shows all averages over 100 achieved by players throughout the tournament. For players with multiple high averages, this is indicated by the number in brackets.

The three-dart average is the most cited statistic in darts matches as it gives a rough estimate of a player's form. For comparison with previous years, see the highest ever recorded averages in the World Darts Championship.

Player	Round	Average	Opponent	Result
Callan Rydz	1	107.06	Romeo Grbavac	Won
Luke Littler	SF	105.48	Stephen Bunting	Won
Callan Rydz (2)	3	105.31	Dimitri Van den Bergh	Won
Callan Rydz (3)	QF	103.88	Michael van Gerwen	Lost
Luke Littler (2)	4	103.14	Ryan Joyce	Won
Michael van Gerwen	QF	103.10	Callan Rydz	Won
Luke Littler (3)	F	102.73	Michael van Gerwen	Won
Michael van Gerwen (2)	4	101.98	Jeffrey de Graaf	Won
Connor Scutt	1	101.92	Ben Robb	Won
Luke Littler (4)	QF	101.54	Nathan Aspinall	Won
Ryan Searle	3	100.97	Ryan Joyce	Lost
Peter Wright	4	100.93	Luke Humphries	Won
Luke Littler (5)	2	100.85	Ryan Meikle	Won
Michael van Gerwen (3)	F	100.69	Luke Littler	Lost
Stephen Bunting	SF	100.10	Luke Littler	Lost
Stephen Bunting (2)	3	100.06	Madars Razma	Won

== Media coverage ==
In the United Kingdom, Sky Sports is the TV broadcaster for the coverage, with the event airing on a dedicated channel which replaced its Sky Sports F1 channel for the duration of the tournament. Sky Sports coverage was presented by Emma Paton, Anna Woolhouse and Michael Bridge with punditry and commentary coming from Stuart Pyke, Rod Studd, Dan Dawson, Abigail Davies, John Part, Mark Webster, Laura Turner, and Glen Durrant. Wayne Mardle was not present for the coverage due to the death of his wife prior to the start of the tournament.

Talksport also provided coverage of the event via their digital channel Talksport 2 with selected coverage on Talksport and the new Talksport darts YouTube channel. Talksport coverage featured Ian Danter, Chris Mason, Paul Nicholson, Chris Murphy, Mark Wilson and Gabbie Partington.
