= Huw Ware =

Welsh darts referee (born 1993)

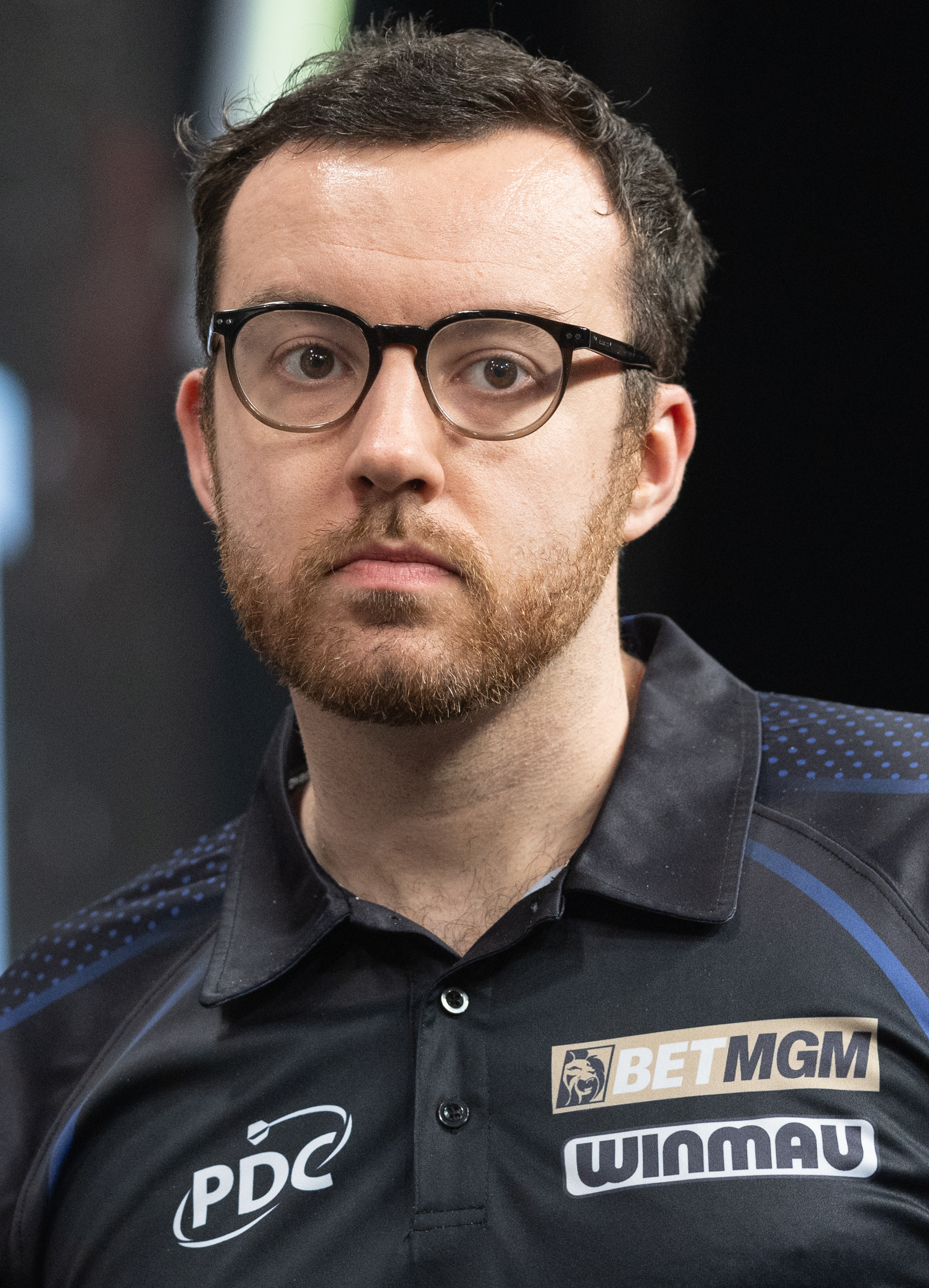
- Ware in 2026
- Born: 4 October 1993 (age 32); Portsmouth, England
- Occupation: Darts referee
- Years active: 2011–present
- Known for: Refereeing Professional Darts Corporation events
- Website: huwware.com

Huw Ware (born 4 October 1993) is a Welsh darts referee who works for the Professional Darts Corporation (PDC) and for Winmau as a global ambassador. He began his career with the British Darts Organisation (BDO), where he officiated two BDO World Championship finals. He moved to the PDC in 2016, where he officiated his first PDC World Championship final in 2025.

As the first openly gay man to officiate a darts world final, Ware has become an advocate for LGBTQ inclusion in sports and has taken on an ambassadorial role for the PDC as part of the organisation's support for Stonewall's Rainbow Laces campaign.

== Early life ==
Huw Ware was born in Portsmouth, England, on 4 October 1993. His parents served in the naval police before the family relocated to the Welsh town of Barry. He first became interested in darts when he watched Phil Taylor play Dennis Priestley at the 2005 World Matchplay on television. He started playing darts at Barry Rugby Club, where he called his first match at the age of 12. He also played county youth darts for Glamorgan and represented Wales internationally at the 2011 WDF Europe Youth Cup, as part of the boys team.

== Career ==
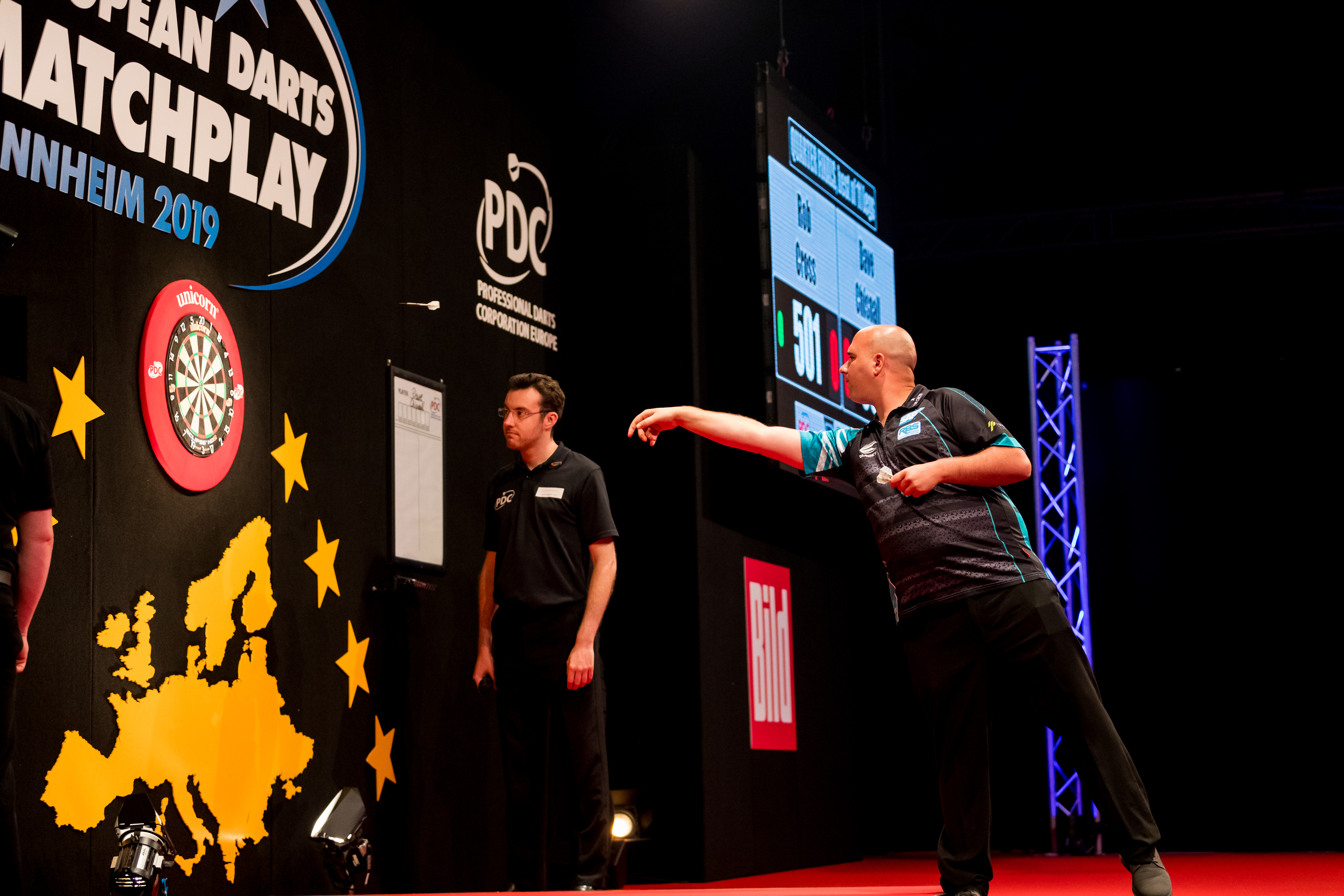
Ware on stage with Rob Cross at the 2019 European Darts Matchplay

Ware first worked as a referee for the British Darts Organisation (BDO) at the 2011 World Masters, where he was also competing as a youth player. At age 17, this made him the youngest darts referee to officiate a televised match. He officiated at the BDO World Championship for the first time at the 2012 edition and went on to officiate two BDO world finals: the first half of the 2013 final and the second half of the 2014 final. In 2015, he appeared on television as the referee for the Comic Relief fundraiser Let's Play Darts for Comic Relief.

Ware moved to the Professional Darts Corporation (PDC) in 2016. In 2018, he took on the role of LGBTQ ambassador for darts as part of the PDC's support for Stonewall's Rainbow Laces campaign. In 2024, he became a global ambassador for darts manufacturer Winmau. He launched his blog Tops and Tales the same year, documenting his experiences in the world of darts. He also launched a podcast of the same name in 2025.

Ware officiated his first PDC World Championship final at the 2025 edition, serving as referee for the second half of the match where Luke Littler defeated Michael van Gerwen. He became the first openly gay man to officiate a darts world final.

Ware's stern responses to crowds whistling during darts matches have received frequent coverage and praise in darts news sources.

== Personal life ==
Ware publicly came out as gay on 2 February 2014, writing a blog post about LGBTQ History Month and posting it to social media before turning off his phone and going out with friends to a pub quiz. He recounted feeling overwhelmed by the positive reaction to his announcement.

Ware has cited Welsh rugby union referee Nigel Owens, who came out as gay in 2007, as an inspiration of his; in a 2025 piece for the Western Mail, Owens stated he was "really happy" to have inspired Ware. As an LGBTQ+ ambassador for darts, Ware has expressed that despite considering quitting the sport due to homophobia he faced early in his career, he hopes his subsequent success can break barriers for others and show that sports can be inclusive for everyone. He also set up a Facebook group named Out on the Oche for LGBTQ+ fans of darts and has spoken out against transphobia towards players such as Noa-Lynn van Leuven.

Ware was an English language student at Cardiff University. In spite of his job as a referee, Ware joked in a 2025 interview that he is "not brilliant at maths".
