= Jeffrey de Graaf =

Swedish darts player (born 1990)

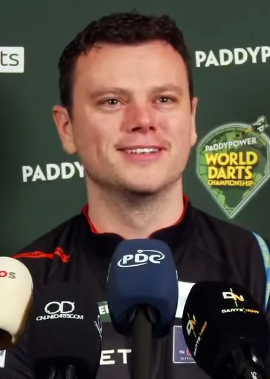
- De Graaf at the 2025 World Championship

Personal information
- Born: 21 November 1990 (age 35) Den Helder, Netherlands
- Home town: Stockholm, Sweden

Sport
- Sport: Darts
- Playing since: 2006
- Darts: 23g Target Signature Gen 1
- Laterality: Right-handed
- Walk-on music: "Hooked on a Feeling" by Blue Swede

Organisation (see split in darts)
- BDO: 2010–2016
- PDC: 2016–2019; 2021–present (Tour Card: 2016–2018; 2024–)
- Current world ranking: (PDC) 39 (5 November 2026)

WDF major events – best performances
- World Championship: Last 32: 2013, 2014, 2015, 2016
- World Masters: Last 32: 2012, 2013, 2014, 2015
- World Trophy: Runner-up: 2015
- Finder Masters: Quarter-final: 2012
- Dutch Open: Quarter-final: 2015

PDC premier events – best performances
- World Championship: Last 16: 2025
- UK Open: Last 64: 2016
- Grand Slam: Group Stage: 2026
- PC Finals: Last 16: 2024
- Masters: Last 32: 2026

Other tournament wins
- Years
BDO events
Belgium Open	2015
Denmark Masters (×2)	2014, 2015
Denmark Open	2013
Finnish Open	2014
German Open	2015
Isle of Man Open	2012
Romanian Open	2012
Swedish Open	2013
Players Championships (×2)
2025 Players Championship 24; 2026 Players Championship 19
PDC Nordic & Baltic Tour (×5)
2023 (×2); 2024 (×3)
Medal record
Men's Darts
Representing Netherlands
WDF Europe Cup
Bronze medal – third place	2014 Bucharest	Men's team

Jeffrey de Graaf (born 21 November 1990) is a Dutch-born Swedish professional darts player who competes in Professional Darts Corporation (PDC) events. He won nine British Darts Organisation (BDO) titles and finished as the runner-up at the 2015 BDO World Trophy before moving to the PDC in 2016. De Graaf has since won two PDC ranking titles. He has also won five titles on the PDC Nordic & Baltic Tour.

Born in the Netherlands, De Graaf received Swedish citizenship in 2023 and has represented the nation ever since. He reached the quarter-finals of the 2024 PDC World Cup representing Sweden alongside teammate Oskar Lukasiak. His best World Championship performance is reaching the last 16 at the 2025 PDC World Championship.

== Career ==
=== BDO ===
In 2012, De Graaf began playing the international circuit and won the 2012 Isle of Man Open and 2012 Romanian Open. He also reached the quarter-finals of the Zuiderduin Masters.

De Graaf managed to qualify for the 2013 BDO World Championship, where he faced compatriot Jan Dekker in the first round. He missed one match dart in the final set, and Dekker ultimately won by three sets to two. De Graaf won in the course of the year the Denmark Open and Swedish Open. De Graaf qualified for the 2014 World Championship, where he lost 3–0 to Martin Atkins in the first round. De Graaf also played in the 2014 BDO World Trophy. After winning in the first two rounds, he lost in the quarter-finals to James Wilson. Later in the year De Graaf again won two titles, the Denmark Masters and the Finnish Open.

In his third Lakeside appearance, De Graaf was eliminated in the first round again, this time 3–0 by Brian Dawson. He reached the final of the BDO World Trophy in February, in which he played against Geert De Vos. De Graaf missed one match dart for the title and ultimately lost 10–9. In the rest of the year De Graaf won three titles, the German Open, the Denmark Masters and the Belgium Open.

At his fourth attempt at the Lakeside De Graaf was knocked out again in the first round, losing 3–2 against Richard Veenstra. A few days later, De Graaf announced his move from the BDO to the PDC.

=== PDC ===
In 2016 De Graaf entered Q-School attempting to get a tour card for the 2016 PDC Pro Tour. He won a card on Day 3. This meant De Graaf qualified for the UK Open, where he started in the second round. He defeated William O'Connor 6–5 on the main stage. A round later, he lost 9–8 against Rob Cross after leading 8–5. In late March, De Graaf also made his debut on the European Tour at the German Darts Masters. After beating Darren Johnson 6–4 in the first round, he was defeated by Michael Smith 6–5 in the second round. A consistent debut year in the PDC saw him qualify for the Players Championship Finals and he overcame Steve Beaton 6–4, before being eliminated 6–1 by Robbie Green in the second round, despite averaging 101.22. De Graaf won a place in the 2017 World Championship through the European Order of Merit and he lost 3–1 to Jelle Klaasen in the first round.

He lost his PDC Tour Card at the end of 2018 following a 3–2 defeat to Noel Malicdem in the first round of the 2019 PDC World Darts Championship. In 2023, he started to represent Sweden instead of Netherlands, and made his debut at PDC Nordic and Baltic Tour.

De Graaf qualified for the 2024 PDC World Darts Championship through PDC Nordic and Baltic Tour, making his first appearance since 2019. In the first round he came back from two sets down against Ritchie Edhouse, winning 3–2. In the second round he defeated José de Sousa 3–1 and advanced into the third round, where he lost to Rob Cross 4–2. De Graaf earned a Tour card via European Q-School in 2024, making a return to the PDC Pro Tour for the first time since 2018. He reached a first PDC ranking final at Players Championship 10 in May 2024. De Graaf was defeated in the final by Brendan Dolan 8–4 in legs.

De Graaf qualified for the 2025 PDC World Darts Championship via both the PDC Pro Tour Order of Merit, and the PDC Nordic and Baltic Tour, but was drawn as a Pro Tour qualifier. He defeated Rashad Sweeting 3–1 in the first round. Afterwards, he achieved a shock 3–0 win over Gary Anderson, who was one of the favorites to win the tournament. Facing off against Paolo Nebrida in the third round, De Graaf was able to win 4–1 to reach the fourth round for the first time in his career. He was beaten 4–2 by Michael van Gerwen, after coming back from two sets down against him. By reaching the fourth round in the World Championship, De Graaf made it into the top 64 on the PDC Order of Merit in the first year of his tour card.

After losing to Martin Schindler in the final of Players Championship 8 on the 2025 PDC Pro Tour, De Graaf won his first PDC ranking title at Players Championship 24, defeating Stephen Bunting 8–7 in the final. He became the first Swedish player to win a PDC ranking title. At the 2026 PDC World Darts Championship, he was unable to replicate his previous success, losing to Paul Lim 3–1 in the first round. De Graaf won his second PDC ranking title at Players Championship 19 in June 2026 by beating Jonny Clayton 8–5 in the final.

== Personal life ==
Born in Den Helder in the Netherlands, De Graaf moved to Sweden in 2018 to live with his Swedish girlfriend. After living in the country for five years, he received Swedish citizenship in 2023 and has since represented Sweden competitively.

== World Championship results ==
=== BDO ===
- 2013: First round (lost to Jan Dekker 2–3)
- 2014: First round (lost to Martin Atkins 0–3)
- 2015: First round (lost to Brian Dawson 0–3)
- 2016: First round (lost to Richard Veenstra 2–3)

=== PDC ===
- 2017: First round (lost to Jelle Klaasen 1–3)
- 2019: First round (lost to Noel Malicdem 2–3)
- 2024: Third round (lost to Rob Cross 2–4)
- 2025: Fourth round (lost to Michael van Gerwen 2–4)
- 2026: First round (lost to Paul Lim 1–3)

== Performance timeline ==
=== BDO ===
Tournament	2012	2013	2014	2015	2016
BDO Ranked televised events
World Championship	DNP	1R	1R	1R	1R
World Trophy	Not held		QF	F	PDC
World Masters	L32	L32	L32	L32	PDC
Finder Masters	QF	RR	RR	RR	PDC

=== PDC ===
Tournament	2016	2017	2018	2019	2024	2025	2026
PDC Ranked televised events
World Championship	BDO	1R	DNQ	1R	3R	4R	1R
World Masters	Did not qualify					Prel.	1R
UK Open	3R	2R	DNQ		1R	WD	4R
Grand Slam	Did not qualify						RR
Players Championship Finals	2R	1R	1R	DNQ	3R	1R	
PDC Non-ranked televised events
World Cup	DNQ				QF	2R	
Career statistics
PDC Year-end ranking	70	55	62	NR	64	51	

==== European Tour ====
Season	1	2	3	4	5	6	7	8	9	10	11	12	13	14	15
2016	DDM; DNQ	GDM; 2R	GDT; DNQ	EDM; DNQ	ADO; 1R	EDO; 1R	IDO; 1R	EDT; DNQ	EDG; 1R	GDC; DNQ					
2017	GDC; DNQ	GDM; 3R	GDO; 1R	EDG; 1R	Did not qualify										
2018	Did not qualify					DDM; 1R	GDT; 1R	DNQ			DDC; 3R	IDO; DNQ	EDT; 1R		
2023	Did not qualify										GDO; 1R	HDT; DNP	GDC; 1R		
2024	Did not qualify						DDC; 3R	EDO; 2R	Did not qualify						
2025	Did not qualify									FDT; 1R	DNQ			GDC; 1R	
2026	PDO; 1R	DNQ							SDO; 1R	DNQ		CDO; 2R	FDT; 2R	SDT; 3R	DDC; 2R

==== Players Championships ====
Season	1	2	3	4	5	6	7	8	9	10	11	12	13	14	15	16	17	18	19	20	21	22	23	24	25	26	27	28	29	30	31	32	33	34
2016	BAR; 2R	BAR; 1R	BAR; 3R	BAR; 3R	BAR; 2R	BAR; 3R	BAR; 1R	COV; 1R	COV; 1R	BAR; 2R	BAR; 1R	BAR; 4R	BAR; 4R	BAR; 1R	BAR; 2R	BAR; 1R	DUB; 3R	DUB; 2R	BAR; 1R	BAR; 2R														
2017	BAR; 1R	BAR; 1R	BAR; 2R	BAR; 1R	MIL; 1R	MIL; 3R	BAR; 3R	BAR; 1R	WIG; 1R	WIG; 2R	MIL; QF	MIL; 1R	WIG; 1R	WIG; 2R	BAR; 4R	BAR; 3R	BAR; 3R	BAR; 2R	DUB; 1R	DUB; 1R	BAR; 1R	BAR; 3R												
2018	BAR; 1R	BAR; 2R	BAR; SF	BAR; 3R	MIL; 3R	MIL; 2R	BAR; 1R	BAR; 1R	WIG; 2R	WIG; 1R	MIL; 1R	MIL; 3R	WIG; 3R	WIG; 3R	BAR; 3R	BAR; 1R	BAR; 1R	BAR; 2R	DUB; 3R	DUB; 3R	BAR; 1R	BAR; 1R												
2024	WIG; 1R	WIG; 1R	LEI; 1R	LEI; 1R	HIL; 1R	HIL; 2R	LEI; 2R	LEI; 1R	HIL; 3R	HIL; F	HIL; 1R	HIL; 1R	MIL; 1R	MIL; 3R	MIL; 2R	MIL; 2R	MIL; 2R	MIL; 1R	MIL; 1R	WIG; 1R	WIG; 1R	MIL; 1R	MIL; 1R	WIG; 1R	WIG; 4R	WIG; 1R	WIG; 2R	WIG; 2R	LEI; 1R	LEI; 2R				
2025	DNP				LEI; 1R	LEI; 2R	HIL; 3R	HIL; F	LEI; 1R	LEI; 1R	LEI; 1R	LEI; 1R	ROS; 1R	ROS; 3R	HIL; 4R	HIL; 1R	LEI; 1R	LEI; 1R	LEI; 1R	LEI; 2R	LEI; 1R	HIL; 1R	HIL; 2R	MIL; W	MIL; 1R	HIL; 2R	HIL; 3R	LEI; 1R	LEI; 2R	LEI; 4R	WIG; 1R	WIG; 2R	WIG; 3R	WIG; 2R
2026	HIL; 3R	HIL; 2R	WIG; 1R	WIG; 2R	LEI; 2R	LEI; 2R	LEI; 2R	LEI; 1R	WIG; 1R	WIG; 2R	MIL; 2R	MIL; 1R	HIL; 1R	HIL; 2R	LEI; 2R	LEI; 1R	LEI; 3R	LEI; 3R	MIL; W	MIL; 3R	WIG; 4R	WIG; 1R	LEI; 1R	LEI; 1R	HIL; SF	HIL; 3R	LEI; 1R	LEI; 4R	ROS; QF	ROS; 1R	ROS; QF	ROS; 1R	LEI; 2R	LEI; 1R

Performance Table Legend
W	Won the tournament	F	Finalist	SF	Semifinalist	QF	Quarterfinalist	#R; RR; L#	Lost in # round Round-robin; Last # stage	DQ	Disqualified
DNQ	Did not qualify	DNP	Did not participate	WD	Withdrew	NH	Tournament not held	#R; RR; L#	Lost in # round Round-robin; Last # stage	NYF	Not yet founded

== Career finals ==
=== BDO major finals: 1 (1 runner-up) ===
Outcome	No.	Year	Championship	Opponent in the final	Score
Runner-up	1.	2015	BDO World Trophy	(Belgium) Geert De Vos	9–10 (l)
