= Rashad Sweeting =

Bahaman darts player

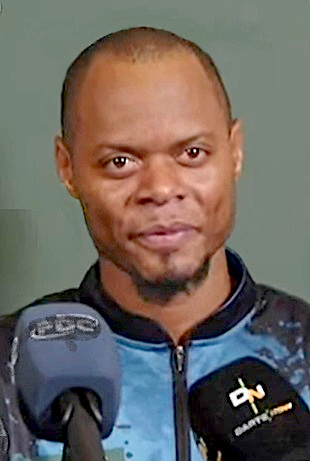
- Sweeting at the 2025 World Championship

Personal information
- Nicknames: "The Candyman", "Mr Sweet Thing"
- Born: June 3, 1990 (age 36) Nassau, Bahamas

Sport
- Sport: Darts
- Playing since: 2009
- Darts: 23g Winmau
- Laterality: Right-handed
- Walk-on music: "I'm a Bahamian (That's What I Like)" by Nakhaz

PDC premier events – best performances
- World Championship: Last 96: 2025

Other tournament wins
- Years
CDLC Tour	2024 (x2), 2025 (x2)

Rashad Sweeting (born June 3, 1990) is a Bahamian darts player. Sweeting played at the 2025 PDC World Darts Championship, becoming the first ever Bahamian to play at a world championship. He faced Jeffrey de Graaf in the first round, winning the first set but losing the next three to be eliminated.

== Career ==
Sweeting took up darts in 2009, and described Phil Taylor as his “motivation”.

Sweeting represented the Bahamas at the 2023 WDF World Cup.

Sweeting sealed his qualification for the 2025 PDC World Championship via the Championship Darts Latin America and Caribbean (CDLC) Order of Merit, winning two of the four events held in 2024. In Montego Bay, Jamaica, in July, he defeated Costa Rica’s Guillermo Soto 6–5 in the final, while in October in Santiago, Chile, he earned a 6–1 victory over Sudesh Fitzgerald to win his second event. He was denied back-to-back titles by Soto, who recovered from 5–3 down to win Event 4. At the World Championship, Sweeting became the first player to represent the Bahamas at the competition. He was drawn against Jeffrey de Graaf in the first round. Sweeting won the first set of the match 3–1, following seven missed doubles from de Graaf. Sweeting had the opportunity to go 2–0 up in sets, but missed set darts. De Graaf tied the game at 1–1 before winning the next two sets to defeat Sweeting 3–1.

Despite defeat, he earned the attention of fans and media for his arrival - heading in the wrong direction - and for celebrating a 180 with the "cold" celebration of Chelsea F.C.'s Cole Palmer. As tournament sponsor, Irish gambling company Paddy Power were donating £1,000 to charity Prostate Cancer UK for every 180 hit at the event, they showed their appreciation for Sweeting's 180 by paying for his travel costs.

In February 2025, he signed a deal with Winmau.

== Personal life ==
His walk-on music is "I'm a Bahamian (That's What I Like)" by Nakhaz, which he selected to dispel myths about the people of his nation. Away from the sport, Sweeting works as an immigration officer.

== World Championship results ==
=== PDC ===
- 2025: First round (lost to Jeffrey de Graaf 1–3)
