= 2026 WDF calendar =

Tournament information
- Dates: Yearly
- Country: Worldwide
- Organisation(s): WDF
- Format: 501 Legs (open & women's)
- Prize fund: Depends on tournament's category

2026 WDF season of darts comprises every tournament of World Darts Federation. The prize money of the tournaments may vary depending on category.

2026 is the sixth year in darts under WDF-sole management after the demise of BDO in 2020.

== Tournament categories, points & prize money ==
World Darts Federation		Points						
Category	Prize Fund ($)	1st	2nd	3/4	5/8	9/16	17/32	33/64
Platinum	It depends on each tournament	270	167	103	64	39	26	13
Gold	It depends on each tournament	180	111	68	43	26	17	9
Silver	It depends on each tournament	90	56	34	21	13	9	
Bronze	It depends on each tournament	45	28	17	11	6		

== Calendar ==
=== January ===
Date	Tournament	Cat.	Venue	City	Prize money	Open			Women's			Ref.
Date	Tournament	Cat.	Venue	City	Prize money	winner	score	runner-up	winner	score	runner-up	Ref.
January 17	Las Vegas Open	Gold	Tuscany Suites and Casino	(United States) Paradise	$13,320	(United States) Jason Brandon	6–0	(United States) Alex Spellman	(England) Deta Hedman	5–2	(United States) Cali West	
January 18	Las Vegas Classic	Silver	Tuscany Suites and Casino	(United States) Paradise	$11,230	(United States) Chris Lim	5–2	(United States) Jason Brandon	(England) Deta Hedman	5–2	(England) Wendy Reinstadtler	
January 24–25	Snoflake Open	Bronze	River Cree Resort & Casino	(Canada) Enoch	C$6,760	(Canada) Evan Suderman	6–0	(Canada) Shane Rattigan	(Japan) Shiori Sato	5–1	(Japan) Kosuzu Iwao	
January 23–25	Bucharest Open	Bronze	Radisson Blu Hotel	(Romania) Bucharest	€2,320	(Northern Ireland) Neil Duff	5–2	(England) Harry Lane	(England) Paula Jacklin	5–3	(Turkey) Emine Dursun	
January 24–25	Romanian Classic	Silver	Radisson Blu Hotel	(Romania) Bucharest	€8,000	(England) Jenson Walker	5–1	(Netherlands) Moreno Blom	(Germany) Irina Armstrong	5–2	(England) Deta Hedman	
January 25	Romanian Open	Silver	Radisson Blu Hotel	(Romania) Bucharest	€8,000	(England) Cayden Smith	5–2	(Serbia) Mladen Radosavljević	(England) Deta Hedman	5–1	(Finland) Kirsi Viinikainen	

=== February ===
Date	Tournament	Cat.	Venue	City	Prize money	Open			Women's			Ref.
Date	Tournament	Cat.	Venue	City	Prize money	winner	score	runner-up	winner	score	runner-up	Ref.
February 7	Canterbury Classic	Silver	Canterbury & Suburban Darts Assoc.	(New Zealand) Christchurch	NZ$10,060	(New Zealand) Jonny Tata	6–4	(New Zealand) Jack Sheppard	(New Zealand) Wendy Harper	5–3	(New Zealand) Nicole Regnaud	
February 7–8	Dutch Open	Platinum	De Bonte Wever	(Netherlands) Assen	€36,940	(Germany) Paul Krohne	3–2 (sets)	(Netherlands) Corné Groeneveld	(Netherlands) Priscilla Steenbergen	5–3	(Norway) Rachna David	
February 14–15	Scottish Classic	Silver	Normandy Hotel Glasgow	(Scotland) Renfrew	£7,210	(Scotland) Mitchell Lawrie	5–1	(England) James Beeton	(Scotland) Sophie McKinlay	5–4	(England) Macy Gibbons	
February 15	Scottish Open	Silver	Normandy Hotel Glasgow	(Scotland) Renfrew	£7,210	(England) James Beeton	5–3	(Republic of Ireland) Dylan Slevin	(Republic of Ireland) Rebecca Allen	5–2	(Scotland) Lorraine Hyde	
February 15	South Australian Classic	Silver	Licensed Club Darts Association	(Australia) Salisbury Park	AU$10,440	(Australia) Raymond Smith	6–3	(Australia) Karl Schaefer	(Australia) Monica Ribeiro	5–1	(Australia) Sharon Sin	
February 21	Port City Open	Silver	DoubleTree by Hilton Hotel Portland	(United States) South Portland	$8,280	(United States) Leonard Gates	5–4	(United States) Adam Sevada	(United States) Carolyn Mars	5–2	(United States) Cali West	
February 21	Slovak Classic	Silver	x-bionic® sphere	(Slovakia) Šamorín	€8,020	(Scotland) Mitchell Lawrie	5–3	(Austria) Franko Giuliani	(Czech Republic) Jitka Císařová	5–3	(England) Paula Jacklin	
February 22	Slovak Masters	Bronze	x-bionic® sphere	(Slovakia) Šamorín	€3,160	(Scotland) Mitchell Lawrie	5–3	(Hungary) András Borbély	(Czech Republic) Jitka Císařová	5–2	(Finland) Kirsi Viinikainen	

=== March ===
Date	Tournament	Cat.	Venue	City	Prize money	Open			Women's			Ref.
Date	Tournament	Cat.	Venue	City	Prize money	winner	score	runner-up	winner	score	runner-up	Ref.
March 7	Missouri St. Patricks Open	Bronze	Inn at Grand Glaize	(United States) Osage Beach	$2,460	(United States) Leonard Gates	6–3	(United States) Jake Simpson	(United States) Nancy King	4–3	(United States) Liz Tynan	
March 5–8	Isle of Man Classic	Silver	Villa Marina	(Isle of Man) Douglas	£7,160	(Netherlands) Moreno Blom	5–1	(Catalonia) Daniel Zapata	(Wales) Leanne Topper	5–4	(Wales) Eve Watson	
March 6–8	Isle of Man Masters	Bronze	Villa Marina	(Isle of Man) Douglas	£5,180	(England) Reece Colley	5–3	(Scotland) Jim McEwan	(Wales) Rhian O'Sullivan	5–2	(Netherlands) Aileen de Graaf	
March 7–8	Isle of Man Open	Gold	Villa Marina	(Isle of Man) Douglas	£14,000	(England) Jack Drayton	6–2	(England) Ben Townley	(England) Gemma Hayter	5–1	(England) Steph Clarke	
March 13	WDF Youth Challenge/Open (U18)	Bronze	Sportcenter Donaucity	(Austria) Vienna	n/a	(Austria) Adriano Rajic	6–5	(Netherlands) Kai Burger	(Turkey) Zehra Gemi	6–3	(Turkey) Ayşegül Karagöz	
March 14	West City Open	Silver	West City Darts Association	(New Zealand) Rānui	NZ$10,020	(New Zealand) Ben Robb	6–2	(New Zealand) Haupai Puha	(New Zealand) Nicole Regnaud	5–1	(New Zealand) Desi Mercer	
March 14	WDF Youth Challenge (U18)	Platinum	Sportcenter Donaucity	(Austria) Vienna	n/a	(Germany) Béla Janas	5–3	(Hungary) Zsolt Csajbók	(Turkey) Zehra Gemi	5–2	(Germany) Merve Hummel	
March 14	WDF Youth Challenge (U23)	Silver	Sportcenter Donaucity	(Austria) Vienna	n/a	(Hungary) Péter Kelemen	5–2	(Austria) Patrick Neumeister	(Denmark) Maite Navamuel	5–4	(Germany) Kira Mertens	
March 14	WDF Youth Challenge/Open (U23)	Bronze	Sportcenter Donaucity	(Austria) Vienna	n/a	(Hungary) Péter Kelemen	5–3	(Denmark) Jakob Skovgård	(Germany) Kira Mertens	5–4	(Denmark) Maite Navamuel	
March 15	WDF Youth Challenge/Masters (U23)	Silver	Sportcenter Donaucity	(Austria) Vienna	n/a	(Hungary) Milán Biró	5–2	(Belgium) Dries Cremers	(Denmark) Maite Navamuel	5–0	(Germany) Kira Mertens	
March 15	WDF Youth Challenge/Classic (U23)	Bronze	Sportcenter Donaucity	(Austria) Vienna	n/a	(Hungary) Péter Kelemen	5–1	(Austria) Leon Eder	(Germany) Kira Mertens	5–2	(Denmark) Ida Hansen	
March 21	Northern Ireland Open	Silver	The Devenish Complex	(Northern Ireland) Belfast	£7,020	(Northern Ireland) Neil Duff	5–3	(Northern Ireland) Neil Withers	(Netherlands) Anca Zijlstra	5–1	(England) Paula Jacklin	
March 22	Northern Ireland Matchplay	Bronze	The Devenish Complex	(Northern Ireland) Belfast	£1,800	(England) Pat Scurfield	5–3	(Republic of Ireland) Dylan Quinn	(Netherlands) Anca Zijlstra	4–2	(England) Paula Jacklin	
March 21–22	AB Open	Bronze	AAS Hull-Volant	(Canada) Gatineau	C$2,200	(Canada) Jean-Michel Legault	5–4	(Canada) Shane Sakchekapo	(Canada) Kayla Smith	5–2	(Canada) Naty Marchand	
March 28	Virginia Beach Classic	Silver	Wyndham Virginia Beach Oceanfront	(United States) Virginia Beach	$7,070	(United States) Jim Widmayer	5–0	(Canada) Jean-Michel Legault	(Canada) Maria Carli	5–2	(United States) Cali West	
March 28	Faroe Islands Open	Bronze	Glasir Sports Hall	(Faroe Islands) Tórshavn	kr.20,400	(Netherlands) Corné Groeneveld	5–0	(Faroe Islands) Jan Erik Fjallstein	(Sweden) Anna Forsmark	5–0	(Denmark) Maite Navamuel	
March 29	Tórshavn Open	Silver	Glasir Sports Hall	(Faroe Islands) Tórshavn	kr.60,000	(Netherlands) Corné Groeneveld	6–3	(Faroe Islands) John Imrie	(Sweden) Anna Forsmark	5–4	(Sweden) Maud Jansson	

=== April ===
Date	Tournament	Cat.	Venue	City	Prize money	Open			Women's			Ref.
Date	Tournament	Cat.	Venue	City	Prize money	winner	score	runner-up	winner	score	runner-up	Ref.
April 4	South Island Masters	Bronze	Otepuni Community Hub	(New Zealand) Invercargill	NZ$3,400	(New Zealand) Haupai Puha	5–0	(New Zealand) Brian Bullen	(New Zealand) Lisa Waerehu	5–3	(New Zealand) Chenesse Kauika	
April 5	VIC Robb Classic	Bronze	Geelong Darts Club	(Australia) Corio	AU$5,520	(Australia) Brody Klinge	5–3	(Australia) Mal Cuming	(Australia) Christine Richardson	5–3	(Australia) Joanne Hadley	
April 18	Tricoda Open	Silver	Best Western Plus	(United States) Baltimore	$6,400	(United States) Stephen Phillips	5–1	(United States) Dustin Holt	(United States) Paula Murphy	5–2	(United States) Aaja Jalbert	
April 18	Estonia Open	Bronze	Sokos Hotel Viru	(Estonia) Tallinn	€2,580	(Netherlands) Mike van Duivenbode	6–2	(Finland) Jonas Masalin	(Netherlands) Aileen de Graaf	6–5	(Finland) Kirsi Viinikainen	
April 19	Tallinn Open	Bronze	Sokos Hotel Viru	(Estonia) Tallinn	€2,580	(England) Anthony Brown	6–5	(Finland) Petri Rasmus	(Netherlands) Aileen de Graaf	6–4	(Finland) Kirsi Viinikainen	
April 19	North Island Masters	Bronze	Hastings Darts Association	(New Zealand) Hastings	NZ$4,140	(New Zealand) Jack Sheppard	5–0	(New Zealand) Hunter Eyles	(New Zealand) Nicole Regnaud	5–3	(New Zealand) Desi Mercer	
April 25–26	Salmon Harvest Open	Bronze	Chief Petty Officers' Mess	(Canada) Esquimalt	C$3,040	(Canada) Shane Sakchekapo	5–2	(Canada) Dalton Desmarais	(Canada) Brenda Moreau	5–2	(Canada) Jayda Hammond	
April 26	Murray Bridge Grand Prix	Silver	Murray Bridge Darts Club	(Australia) White Hill	AU$9,170	(Australia) Declan Bailey	5–3	(Australia) Justin Thompson	(Australia) Hayley Davis	5–4	(Australia) Lyn Morrison	
April 26	Selangor Open	Bronze	Quayside Mall	(Malaysia) Telok Panglima Garang	RM8,980	(Philippines) Louis Lopez	4–2	(Malaysia) Norisyam Sebi	(Thailand) Ornong Boonyanit	4–0	(Malaysia) Dewi Kembang	

=== May ===
Date	Tournament	Cat.	Venue	City	Prize money	Open			Women's			Ref.
Date	Tournament	Cat.	Venue	City	Prize money	winner	score	runner-up	winner	score	runner-up	Ref.
May 1	Danube Classic	Bronze	Récsei Center	(Hungary) Budapest	HUF783,000	(England) Mark Stephenson	5–3	(Czech Republic) Jiří Brejcha	(Czech Republic) Jitka Císařová	4–2	(Hungary) Veronika Ihász	
May 2	Danube Masters	Bronze	Récsei Center	(Hungary) Budapest	HUF783,000	(Austria) Franko Giuliani	5–2	(Hungary) András Borbély	(Czech Republic) Jitka Císařová	5–2	(Netherlands) Anca Zijlstra	
May 2	Budapest Classic	Bronze	Récsei Center	(Hungary) Budapest	HUF783,000	(Netherlands) Moreno Blom	5–2	(Germany) Carsten Hoffmann	(Czech Republic) Jitka Císařová	5–0	(England) Paige Pauling	
May 3	Budapest Masters	Bronze	Récsei Center	(Hungary) Budapest	HUF783,000	(Austria) Franko Giuliani	5–4	(Germany) Carsten Hoffmann	(Czech Republic) Jitka Císařová	5–0	(Netherlands) Anca Zijlstra	
May 2	Denmark Open	Gold	Granly Hockey Arena	(Denmark) Esbjerg	DKK125,300	(Scotland) Mitchell Lawrie	6–2	(Netherlands) Jarno Bottenberg	(England) Deta Hedman	5–2	(Turkey) Zehra Gemi	
May 3	Denmark Masters	Silver	Granly Hockey Arena	(Denmark) Esbjerg	DKK60,600	(Scotland) Scott Robertson	6–4	(Northern Ireland) Neil Duff	(Netherlands) Aileen de Graaf	5–4	(England) Deta Hedman	
May 14	Ulaanbaatar Open	Bronze	Triple Event Hall	(Mongolia) Ulaanbaatar	₮9,000,000	(Mongolia) Altangerel Gongor	5–1	(Mongolia) Byambasugar Bayarsaikhan	(Mongolia) Amgalan Tsogbayar	5–3	(Mongolia) Enerjin Batbold	
May 15	Mongolia Open	Bronze	Triple Event Hall	(Mongolia) Ulaanbaatar	₮9,000,000	(Japan) Ryuta Arihara	5–4	(Singapore) Paul Lim	(Mongolia) Amgalan Tsogbayar	5–1	(Mongolia) Enerjin Batbold	
May 16	Hutt Valley Singles	Bronze	Hutt Valley Darts Association	(New Zealand) Taitā	NZ$5,020	(New Zealand) Haupai Puha	5–1	(New Zealand) Caleb Hope	(New Zealand) Nicole Regnaud	5–2	(New Zealand) Desi Mercer	
May 16	Nordic Cup Open	Bronze	Quality Hotel 33	(Norway) Oslo	NOK32,040	(Finland) Jani Laurila	6–4	(Sweden) Dennis Nilsson	(Norway) Rachna David	6–5	(Sweden) Snezana Veljkovic	
May 16–17	Cyprus Classic	Bronze	Odysseia Hotel Kapetanios	(Cyprus) Limassol	€2,470	(Greece) John Michael	5–2	(England) Gary Blackwood	(Greece) Evdokia Nakka	4–3	(England) Jayne Orencas	
May 17	Cyprus Masters	Bronze	Odysseia Hotel Kapetanios	(Cyprus) Limassol	€2,920	(England) Danny Humphries	5–3	(Israel) Dmitrii Rogov	(Cyprus) Popi Athanasiou	4–2	(Czech Republic) Kateřina Sadílková	
May 23	Lithuania Open	Bronze	Mercure Palanga Vanagupe Resort	(Lithuania) Palanga	€2,580	(Estonia) Raido Kruusvee	6–2	(Sweden) Dennis Nilsson	(Finland) Kirsi Viinikainen	6–0	(Latvia) Amanda Kirilova	
May 24	Palanga Open	Bronze	Mercure Palanga Vanagupe Resort	(Lithuania) Palanga	€2,580	(England) Paul Lewis	6–5	(Denmark) Jimmi Nielsen	(Finland) Maret Liiri	6–2	(Finland) Kirsi Viinikainen	
May 23	Toronto Area Open	Gold	Holiday Inn & Suites	(Canada) St. Catharines	C$18,400	(Canada) Jeff Smith	6–4	(England) Keegan Brown	(England) Deta Hedman	5–0	(Canada) Maria Carli	
May 24	Toronto Area Classic	Silver	Holiday Inn & Suites	(Canada) St. Catharines	C$8,000	(United States) Alex Spellman	5–3	(England) Vince Tipple	(England) Deta Hedman	5–2	(Netherlands) Aileen de Graaf	
May 24	Sunshine State Classic	Silver	Inala Darts Club	(Australia) Inala	AU$9,000	(Australia) Declan Bailey	5–4	(Australia) Raymond Smith	(New Zealand) Tracy MacDonald	5–3	(Australia) Jade Whitworth	
May 30	Cherry Bomb International	Bronze	Embassy Suites by Hilton	(United States) Boca Raton	$4,990	(United States) Ethan De Veyra	5–4	(United States) Leonard Gates	(United States) Paula Murphy	5–0	(United States) Tracy Feiertag	
May 31	Canterbury Open	Bronze	Canterbury & Suburban Darts Assoc.	(New Zealand) Christchurch	NZ$6,525	(New Zealand) Haupai Puha	5–0	(New Zealand) Max Dallimore	(New Zealand) Nicole Regnaud	5–1	(New Zealand) Taylor-Marsh Kahaki	

=== June ===
Date	Tournament	Cat.	Venue	City	Prize money	Open			Women's			Ref.
Date	Tournament	Cat.	Venue	City	Prize money	winner	score	runner-up	winner	score	runner-up	Ref.
June 6	Swiss Open	Silver	Chliriethalle	(Switzerland) Oberglatt	€8,000	(Germany) Paul Krohne	6–4	(Netherlands) Ron Meulenkamp	(Germany) Irina Armstrong	5–3	(Italy) Aurora Fochesato	
June 7	Helvetia Open	Silver	Chliriethalle	(Switzerland) Oberglatt	€8,000	(Catalonia) Daniel Zapata	6–1	(Netherlands) Moreno Blom	(Netherlands) Aileen de Graaf	5–1	(Italy) Aurora Fochesato	
June 5–7	Selsey Open	Bronze	Seal Bay Resort	(England) Selsey	£2,700	(England) Stuart Dutton	5–3	(England) Robbie Martin	(England) Deta Hedman	5–1	(Wales) Rhian O'Sullivan	
June 6–7	England National Singles	Silver	Seal Bay Resort	(England) Selsey	£7,210	(England) Harry Lane	5–3	(England) Aaron Turner	(England) Deta Hedman	5–3	(Wales) Rhian O'Sullivan	
June 7	England Open	Silver	Seal Bay Resort	(England) Selsey	£7,210	(Scotland) Scott Robertson	5–2	(England) Chas Barstow	(England) Gemma Hayter	5–1	(England) Deta Hedman	
June 12	Finnish Classic	Bronze	Sokos Hotel Vantaa	(Finland) Vantaa	€3,400	(Sweden) Dennis Nilsson	5–4	(Wales) Alex Williams	(Turkey) Emine Dursun	5–3	(Finland) Kirsi Viinikainen	
June 13	Finnish Open	Silver	Sokos Hotel Vantaa	(Finland) Vantaa	€8,000	(Turkey) Mürsel Yavuz	5–0	(Finland) Petri Rasmus	(Finland) Kirsi Viinikainen	5–1	(Turkey) Emine Dursun	
June 14	Finnish Masters	Silver	Sokos Hotel Vantaa	(Finland) Vantaa	€8,000	(Netherlands) Jarno Bottenberg	5–2	(England) Dave Ladley	(Finland) Kirsi Viinikainen	5–4	(Germany) Irina Armstrong	
June 12	WDF Youth Challenge/Open (U18)	Bronze	Récsei Center	(Hungary) Budapest	n/a	(Hungary) Zsolt Csajbók	4–1	(Germany) Markus Schmidt	(Germany) Panagiota Kentzidou	4–1	(Slovakia) Nina Andrejkovičová	
June 13	WDF Youth Challenge (U18)	Gold	Récsei Center	(Hungary) Budapest	n/a	(Hungary) Zsolt Csajbók	5–3	(Austria) Gabriel Martini	(Germany) Merve Hummel	4–2	(Slovakia) Bibiána Bugyiová	
June 13	WDF Youth Challenge (U23)	Bronze	Récsei Center	(Hungary) Budapest	n/a	(Germany) Luca Sutalo	5–4	(Hungary) Petya Szőke	(Hungary) Vanda Dupcsák	4–0	(Slovenia) Tara Lazar	
June 13	WDF Youth Challenge/Open (U23)	Bronze	Récsei Center	(Hungary) Budapest	n/a	(Hungary) Petya Szőke	5–4	(Germany) Luca Sutalo	(Hungary) Vanda Dupcsák	4–0	(Hungary) Vivien Bokros	
June 14	WDF Youth Challenge/Classic (U23)	Bronze	Récsei Center	(Hungary) Budapest	n/a	(Hungary) Barna Krekács	4–3	(Hungary) Péter Kelemen	(Hungary) Vanda Dupcsák	4–0	(Hungary) Vivien Bokros	
June 14	WDF Youth Challenge/Masters (U23)	Bronze	Récsei Center	(Hungary) Budapest	n/a	(Hungary) Péter Kelemen	4–0	(Hungary) Barna Krekács	(Hungary) Vanda Dupcsák	4–3	(Hungary) Vivien Bokros	
June 20	The Steel Open	Silver	Osanbashi Hall	(Japan) Yokohama	¥1,245,000	(Japan) Ryuta Arihara	5–2	(Japan) Mitsuhiko Tatsunami	(Japan) Momoka Hayashi	5–3	(Japan) Mayumi Ouchi	
June 21	The Steel Masters	Gold	Osanbashi Hall	(Japan) Yokohama	¥3,110,000	(Japan) Ryusei Azemoto	6–5	(Hong Kong) Ching Ho Tung	(Japan) Mayumi Ouchi	5–2	(Taiwan) Huang Ying Wei	
June 20–21	Canadian Open	Silver	Sheraton Saint-Hyacinthe Hôtel	(Canada) Saint-Hyacinthe	C$10,800	(Canada) Jeff Smith	5–2	(Canada) Jean-Michel Legault	(Canada) Maria Carli	5–3	(Canada) Josianne Fenech	
June 19–21	Six Nations Cup (S)	Non-ranked	North Devon Resort	(England) Ilfracombe	n/a	(Scotland) Mitchell Lawrie	5–2	(Wales) David Davies	(England) Deta Hedman	5–4	(Wales) Rhian O'Sullivan	
June 19–21	Six Nations Cup (T)	Non-ranked	North Devon Resort	(England) Ilfracombe	n/a	Scotland	13–6	Wales	England	5–3	Wales	
June 26–28	Timișoara Classic	Bronze	Timișoara Convention Center	(Romania) Timișoara	€2,465	(Romania) László Kádár	5–4	(England) Anthony Brown	(Romania) Giulia Olteanu	5–4	(Hungary) Gréta Tekauer	
June 27–28	Timișoara International Open	Bronze	Timișoara Convention Center	(Romania) Timișoara	€2,465	(Northern Ireland) Neil Duff	5–2	(England) Kaya Baysal	(Hungary) Gréta Tekauer	5–2	(Romania) Giulia Olteanu	
June 28	Timisoara Grand Prix	Bronze	Timișoara Convention Center	(Romania) Timișoara	€2,465	(Northern Ireland) Neil Duff	5–2	(Hungary) András Borbély	(Hungary) Gréta Tekauer	5–1	(Romania) Giulia Olteanu	
June 28	New Zealand Open	Gold	Claudelands Arena	(New Zealand) Hamilton	NZ$20,540	(New Zealand) Mark Cleaver	7–2	(New Zealand) Josh Roberts	(New Zealand) Nicole Regnaud	6–4	(New Zealand) Desi Mercer	

=== July ===
Date	Tournament	Cat.	Venue	City	Prize money	Open			Women's			Ref.
Date	Tournament	Cat.	Venue	City	Prize money	winner	score	runner-up	winner	score	runner-up	Ref.
July 4	Akranes Irish Day Open	Bronze	Keilusalur Akraness	(Iceland) Akranes	€2,000	(Iceland) Davíð Svansson	6–5	(Iceland) Hallgrímur Egilsson	(Iceland) Brynja Herborg	6–2	(Iceland) Steinunn Ingvarsdóttir	
July 4	Gibraltar Classic	Silver	George Federico Darts Hall	Gibraltar	£7,100	(England) Matt Clark	5–4	(England) Jenson Walker	(England) Paula Jacklin	5–2	(Germany) Irina Armstrong	
July 5	Gibraltar Open	Silver	George Federico Darts Hall	Gibraltar	£7,100	(Scotland) Mitchell Lawrie	5–2	(Germany) Marcus Maier	(England) Paula Jacklin	5–1	(Spain) Lisa Vandekerckhove	
July 8–11	WDF Europe Youth Cup (S)	WDF	University of Limerick	(Republic of Ireland) Limerick	–	(Scotland) Mitchell Lawrie	6–1	(Belgium) Jason Goossens	(Germany) Merve Hummel	5–1	(Republic of Ireland) Rebecca Allen	
July 8–11	WDF Europe Youth Cup (T)	WDF	University of Limerick	(Republic of Ireland) Limerick	–	Scotland	9–7	England	Turkey	3–1	Ireland	
July 11	Charlotte Open	Silver	Sheraton Airport Hotel	(United States) Charlotte	$7,540	(United States) Garrett French	5–4	(United States) Leonard Gates	(United States) Tracy Feiertag	5–2	(United States) Paula Murphy	
July 17–18	Cosmo Malaysian Open	Silver	Flamingo Hotel by the lake	(Malaysia) Ampang	RM24,600	(Philippines) Christian Delos Reyes	5–2	(Japan) Tomoya Goto	(Philippines) Lovely-Mae Orbeta	5–1	(Philippines) Janice Hinojales	
July 17	World Open (M/W)	Silver	Rio Hotel & Casino	(United States) Paradise	$9,580	(Netherlands) Moreno Blom	5–4	(England) Matthew Edgar	(Wales) Eve Watson	5–3	(Wales) Leanne Topper	
July 17	World Open (B/G)	Platinum	Rio Hotel & Casino	(United States) Paradise	$700	(Canada) Peyton Hammond	5–1	(England) Taylor McGuckian	(England) Ruby Grey	4–3	(England) Paige Pauling	
July 14–18	World Masters (M/W)	Platinum	Rio Hotel & Casino	(United States) Paradise	$59,900	(United States) Chris Lim	7–6	(Belgium) Brian Raman	(England) Gemma Hayter	6–3	(Italy) Aurora Fochesato	
July 14–18	World Masters (B/G)	Platinum	Rio Hotel & Casino	(United States) Paradise	$4,280	(Germany) Benjamin Dopfer	6–2	(Germany) Eric Petereit	(England) Ruby Grey	5–0	(England) Paige Pauling	
July 19	World Championship Qualifiers; Open finalists (2) and Women's winner (1) qualify for 2026 WDF World Championship	WDF	Rio Hotel & Casino	(United States) Paradise	n/a	(Netherlands) Berry Pater	6–1	(Germany) Carsten Hoffmann	(Scotland) Sophie McKinlay	6–3	(Netherlands) Anca Zijlstra	
July 19	World Championship Qualifiers; Open finalists (2) and Women's winner (1) qualify for 2026 WDF World Championship	WDF	Rio Hotel & Casino	(United States) Paradise	n/a	(Germany) Liam Maendl-Lawrance	6–3	(United States) Robbie Phillips	(Scotland) Sophie McKinlay	6–3	(Netherlands) Anca Zijlstra	
July 25–26	Pacific Masters	Gold	Stirling Adriatic Centre	(Australia) Stirling	AU$18,400	(Australia) Blake Hatchett	7–4	(Australia) Joe Comito	(Australia) Christine Richardson	6–3	(Australia) Tiarna Dorotich	
July 26	Japan Open	Silver	Daito City Civic Hall	(Japan) Daitō	¥1,024,000	(Japan) Tokuyo Takayama	5–3	(Japan) Shoichi Yanase	(Japan) Mayumi Ouchi	5–1	(Japan) Kiyo Shimizu	
July 31	Philippines Open	Gold	Winford Resort and Casino	(Philippines) Manila	₱1,480,000	(Malaysia) Terry Tan	6–5	(Japan) Haruki Muramatsu	(Philippines) Lovely-Mae Orbeta	5–3	(Japan) Kosuzu Iwao	
July 31	WDF Youth Challenge/Open (U18)	Gold	MAGION Kultur- & Idrætscenter	(Denmark) Grindsted	n/a	(Germany) Raphael Küther	5–4	(Germany) Béla Janas	(Germany) Merve Hummel	5–1	(Germany) Panagiota Kentzidou	

=== August ===
Date	Tournament	Cat.	Venue	City	Prize money	Open			Women's			Ref.
Date	Tournament	Cat.	Venue	City	Prize money	winner	score	runner-up	winner	score	runner-up	Ref.
August 1	Antwerp Open	Silver	Royal Yacht Club België	(Belgium) Antwerp	€8,000	(Germany) Jaimy van de Weerd	5–1	(Germany) Paul Krohne	(Finland) Kirsi Viinikainen	5–0	(Netherlands) Aileen de Graaf	
August 2	Belgium Open	Silver	Royal Yacht Club België	(Belgium) Antwerp	€8,000	(Germany) Paul Krohne	5–0	(Netherlands) Jerry Hendriks	(Finland) Kirsi Viinikainen	5–1	(Netherlands) Aileen de Graaf	
August 1	WDF Youth Challenge (U18)	Gold	MAGION Kultur- & Idrætscenter	(Denmark) Grindsted	n/a	(Germany) Raphael Küther	5–0	(Germany) Béla Janas	(Germany) Merve Hummel	5–1	(Germany) Leonie Treisch	
August 1	WDF Youth Challenge (U23)	Bronze	MAGION Kultur- & Idrætscenter	(Denmark) Grindsted	n/a	(Denmark) Jakob Skovgård	5–4	(Denmark) Daniel Kortbæk	(Denmark) Ida Hansen	5–3	(Denmark) Maite Navamuel	
August 1	WDF Youth Challenge/Open (U23)	Bronze	MAGION Kultur- & Idrætscenter	(Denmark) Grindsted	n/a	(Denmark) Jakob Skovgård	5–0	(Denmark) Daniel Kortbæk	(Denmark) Maite Navamuel	5–0	(Germany) Marlene Klupsch	
August 2	WDF Youth Challenge/Classic (U23)	Bronze	MAGION Kultur- & Idrætscenter	(Denmark) Grindsted	n/a	(Denmark) Jakob Skovgård	5–4	(Denmark) Daniel Kortbæk	(Denmark) Maite Navamuel	5–3	(Denmark) Ida Hansen	
August 2	WDF Youth Challenge/Masters (U23)	Bronze	MAGION Kultur- & Idrætscenter	(Denmark) Grindsted	n/a	(Denmark) Jakob Skovgård	5–3	(Denmark) Daniel Kortbæk	(Denmark) Maite Navamuel	5–2	(Denmark) Ida Hansen	
August 6	JAKO Sport Classic	Bronze	Apfel Arena	(Croatia) Makarska	€2,960	(England) Kaya Baysal	5–1	(Netherlands) Davy van der Zande	(Netherlands) Priscilla Steenbergen	5–0	(Italy) Giada Ciofi	
August 7	PSK Masters	Bronze	Apfel Arena	(Croatia) Makarska	€3,400	(England) Kaya Baysal	5–0	(Hungary) András Borbély	(Finland) Maret Liiri	5–1	(Slovenia) Petra Klemenčič	
August 8	Croatia Classic	Silver	Apfel Arena	(Croatia) Makarska	€11,640	(Hungary) András Borbély	5–4	(England) Matthew Edgar	(Netherlands) Priscilla Steenbergen	5–2	(Croatia) Marina Letica	
August 9	Apfel Masters	Bronze	Apfel Arena	(Croatia) Makarska	€2,960	(England) Kaya Baysal	5–4	(Czech Republic) Jiří Brejcha	(Croatia) Marina Letica	5–4	(Netherlands) Priscilla Steenbergen	
August 9	Lincolnshire Open	Bronze	The Blues Club	(England) Gainsborough	£1,800	(England) Jenson Walker	5–4	(England) Antony Allen	(England) Lisa Ashton	4–1	(England) Paula Jacklin	
August 14	WDF Youth Challenge/Open (U18)	Platinum	Check-Point Darttreff	(Germany) Borken	n/a	(Belgium) Kylian Drijbooms	5–1	(Germany) Manuel Stolz	(Belgium) Silke Vanhee	4–2	(Germany) Leonie Treisch	
August 15	WDF Youth Challenge (U18)	Gold	Check-Point Darttreff	(Germany) Borken	n/a	(Germany) Elias Jahn	5–2	(Netherlands) Kai Burger	(Belgium) Silke Vanhee	4–1	(Germany) Leonie Treisch	
August 15	WDF Youth Challenge (U23)	Bronze	Check-Point Darttreff	(Germany) Borken	n/a	(Belgium) Lander de Wint	5–4	(Denmark) Daniel Kortbæk	(Germany) Kira Mertens	5–2	(Germany) Julia Siek	
August 15	WDF Youth Challenge/Masters (U23)	Bronze	Check-Point Darttreff	(Germany) Borken	n/a	(Netherlands) Danio Aalders	5–4	(Denmark) Jakob Skovgård	(Germany) Kira Mertens	5–3	(Denmark) Maite Navamuel	
August 16	WDF Youth Challenge/Classic (U23)	Bronze	Check-Point Darttreff	(Germany) Borken	n/a	(Germany) Lukas Nußbaum	5–1	(Germany) Jannik Fürstenau	(Germany) Kira Mertens	5–4	(Denmark) Maite Navamuel	
August 16	WDF Youth Challenge/Open (U23)	Bronze	Check-Point Darttreff	(Germany) Borken	n/a	(Germany) Lukas Nußbaum	5–4	(Denmark) Daniel Kortbæk	(Denmark) Maite Navamuel	4–2	(Germany) Kira Mertens	
August 16	DPFL Live Event	Silver	Reunion Resort & Golf Club	(United States) Reunion	$8,480	(United States) Leonard Gates	5–3	(Canada) David Cameron	(Canada) Maria Carli	5–0	(United States) Jessica Melton	
August 22	Swedish Open	Silver	Scandic Triangeln	(Sweden) Malmö	kr100,000	(Scotland) Ross Montgomery	6–3	(England) Jenson Walker	(Turkey) Emine Dursun	5–3	(Germany) Irina Armstrong	
August 23	Swedish Masters	Silver	Scandic Triangeln	(Sweden) Malmö	kr100,000	(Finland) Petri Rasmus	6–2	(England) Anthony Brown	(Sweden) Anna Forsmark	5–4	(Norway) Rachna David	
August 27	Blue Danube Open	Bronze	Mittelschule Fels am Wagram	(Austria) Fels am Wagram	€3,140	(Turkey) Mürsel Yavuz	6–0	(Netherlands) Davy van der Zande	(Netherlands) Priscilla Steenbergen	5–0	(Slovakia) Denisa Šufliarská	
August 28	Austrian Open	Bronze	Mittelschule Fels am Wagram	(Austria) Fels am Wagram	€3,140	(Netherlands) Moreno Blom	6–1	(England) Nick Fullwell	(Netherlands) Priscilla Steenbergen	5–3	(England) Paula Jacklin	
August 29	Lower Austrian Masters	Silver	Mittelschule Fels am Wagram	(Austria) Fels am Wagram	€8,000	(Belgium) Brian Raman	6–3	(England) Jenson Walker	(Netherlands) Priscilla Steenbergen	5–3	(Czech Republic) Jitka Císařová	
August 30	Death Angel Open	Silver	Mittelschule Fels am Wagram	(Austria) Fels am Wagram	€8,000	(England) Jenson Walker	6–4	(Germany) L Maendl-Lawrance	(England) Paula Jacklin	5–1	(Turkey) Emine Dursun	
August 29	New Zealand Masters	Silver	Kapi Mana Darts Association	(New Zealand) Porirua	NZ$10,060	(New Zealand) Caleb Hope	6–0	(New Zealand) Brian Bullen	(New Zealand) Nicole Regnaud	5–2	(New Zealand) Desi Mercer	
August 27–30	Welsh Masters	Bronze	Sand Bay Holiday Village	(England) Kewstoke	£4,880	(Scotland) Ross Montgomery	5–2	(Wales) David Davies	(Wales) Rhian O'Sullivan	5–3	(England) Fallon Sherrock	
August 28–30	Welsh Classic	Silver	Sand Bay Holiday Village	(England) Kewstoke	£7,210	(England) Kaya Baysal	6–3	(Wales) Llew Bevan	(Sweden) Vicky Pruim	5–4	(Finland) Kirsi Viinikainen	
August 30	Welsh Open	Silver	Sand Bay Holiday Village	(England) Kewstoke	£7,210	(Scotland) Ryan Hogarth	6–3	(Scotland) Ross Montgomery	(England) Deta Hedman	5–3	(England) Fallon Sherrock	

=== September ===
Date	Tournament	Cat.	Venue	City	Prize money	Open			Women's			Ref.
Date	Tournament	Cat.	Venue	City	Prize money	winner	score	runner-up	winner	score	runner-up	Ref.
September 5	Washington Area Open	Silver	Hyatt Regency Dulles	(United States) McNair	$7,580	(United States) Robbie Phillips	5–3	(United States) Joey Lynaugh	(Canada) Maria Carli	5–2	(United States) Layla Buntz	
September 5	Iceland Open	Silver	Ljónagryfjan • Íþróttamiðstöð Njarðvíkur	(Iceland) Njarðvík	kr1,200,000	(Germany) Carsten Hoffmann	7–6	(England) Matthew Edgar	(England) Margaret Sutton	6–2	(Iceland) Steinunn Ingvarsdóttir	
September 6	Iceland Masters	Bronze	Ljónagryfjan • Íþróttamiðstöð Njarðvíkur	(Iceland) Njarðvík	kr353,050	(England) Aaron Turner	7–6	(England) Matthew Edgar	(England) Margaret Sutton	6–4	(Iceland) Brynja Herborg	
September 5	Catalonia Open	Bronze	Fàbrica Llobet-Guri	(Catalonia) Calella	€3,400	(England) Jenson Walker	5–4	(Catalonia) Martín Martí	(England) Paula Jacklin	5–1	(Sweden) Anna Forsmark	
September 6	FCD Anniversary Open	Bronze	Fàbrica Llobet-Guri	(Catalonia) Calella	€3,400	(Belgium) Timothy Verbrugghe	5–1	(England) Nick Fullwell	(England) Paula Jacklin	5–4	(Sweden) Anna Forsmark	
September 12	Taranaki Open	Silver	Taranaki Darts Association	(New Zealand) New Plymouth	NZ$10,060	(New Zealand) Jonny Tata	6–1	(New Zealand) Haupai Puha	(New Zealand) Daphne Walters	5–4	(New Zealand) Taylor-Marsh Kahaki	
September 12	Indian Open	Silver	The LaLiT Great Eastern	(India) Kolkata	$9,100	(Japan) Tomoya Goto	6–1	(India) Ankit Goenka	(India) Mahima Gautam	5–0	(India) Tia Banerjee	
September 12	Witch City Open	Silver	enVision Hotel & Conference Center	(United States) Mansfield	$8,400	(United States) Leonard Gates	5–2	(United States) Robbie Phillips	(Canada) Maria Carli	5–1	(United States) Nicole Hinshaw	
September 11	Adriatic Classic	Bronze	Villaggio Lido d'Abruzzo	(Italy) Roseto degli Abruzzi	€3,000	(England) Jenson Walker	6–1	(England) Nick Fullwell	(Italy) Aurora Fochesato	5–2	(England) Paige Pauling	
September 12	Italian Grand Masters	Silver	Villaggio Lido d'Abruzzo	(Italy) Roseto degli Abruzzi	€8,000	(England) Jenson Walker	6–2	(England) Lewis Gurney	(England) Paula Jacklin	5–2	(Italy) Aurora Fochesato	
September 13	Italian Open	Bronze	Villaggio Lido d'Abruzzo	(Italy) Roseto degli Abruzzi	€3,950	(Italy) Angelo Balsamo	6–4	(England) Lewis Gurney	(Germany) Irina Armstrong	5–1	(Italy) Aurora Fochesato	
September 12	Savaria Classic	Bronze	Szombathely Table Tennis Hall	(Hungary) Szombathely	€2,000	(Israel) Dmitrii Rogov	6–2	(Hungary) József Rucska	(Austria) Catalina Pasa	5–2	(Hungary) Veronika Ihász	
September 13	Savaria Masters	Bronze	Szombathely Table Tennis Hall	(Hungary) Szombathely	€2,000	(Hungary) Zsolt Csajbók	6–2	(Austria) Senad Avdic	(Austria) Catalina Pasa	5–3	(Hungary) Veronika Ihász	
September 19	Auckland Open	Silver	Papatoetoe Cosmopolitan Club	(New Zealand) Papatoetoe	NZ$10,020	(New Zealand) Jonny Tata	6–2	(New Zealand) Mark Cleaver	(New Zealand) Nicole Regnaud	5–4	(New Zealand) Daphne Walters	
September 19–20	British Classic	Silver	Bridlington Spa	(England) Bridlington	£7,210	(England) Harry Lane	6–1	(England) Graham Usher	(Sweden) Vicky Pruim	5–1	(Scotland) Lorraine Hyde	
September 20	British Open	Silver	Bridlington Spa	(England) Bridlington	£7,210	(England) Graham Usher	6–4	(England) Harrison Leigh	(England) Natalie Gilbert	5–3	(England) Deta Hedman	
September 20	North Queensland Classic	Bronze	Townsville Darts Association	(Australia) Annandale	AU$4,400	(Australia) Ky Smith	6–4	(Australia) Declan Bailey	(Australia) Rachel Savage	5–4	(Australia) Venus Johnson	
Sep. 30–Oct. 3	WDF Europe Cup (S)	WDF	Við Tjarnir	(Faroe Islands) Hoyvík	n/a	(Scotland) Mitchell Lawrie	7–4	(Croatia) Zvonimir Lešić	(England) Deta Hedman	7–4	(Wales) Eve Watson	
Sep. 30–Oct. 3	WDF Europe Cup (T)	WDF	Við Tjarnir	(Faroe Islands) Hoyvík	n/a	Ireland	9–2	England	England	9–8	Ireland	

=== October ===
Date	Tournament	Cat.	Venue	City	Prize money	Open			Women's			Ref.
Date	Tournament	Cat.	Venue	City	Prize money	winner	score	runner-up	winner	score	runner-up	Ref.
October 3	Wild West Open	Bronze	Toso's Sports Bar & Grill	(United States) Phoenix	$3,400	(United States) Leonard Gates	5–1	(United States) Mike Scarborough	(Canada) Maria Carli	5–2	(United States) Lisa Yee	
October 4	Singapore Open	Bronze	Forest5 Darts Cafe	(Singapore) Bukit Merah	$4,220	(Malaysia) Terry Tan	5–4	(Singapore) Phuay Wei Tan	(Philippines) Lovely-Mae Orbeta	5–2	(Singapore) Ser Mei Fong	
October 7–10	WDF Asia-Pacific Cup (S)	WDF	Triple Event Hall	(Mongolia) Ulaanbaatar	n/a	(Japan) Hiroki Kaneko	6–4	(Australia) Michael Cassar	(Japan) Mayumi Ouchi	6–3	(New Zealand) Nicole Regnaud	
October 7–10	WDF Asia-Pacific Cup (T)	WDF	Triple Event Hall	(Mongolia) Ulaanbaatar	n/a	Mongolia	9–8	Japan	Mongolia	9–5	Australia	
October 7–10	WDF Asia-Pacific Cup (Y)	WDF	Triple Event Hall	(Mongolia) Ulaanbaatar	n/a	(Mongolia) Tergel Khürelkhüü	6–2	(Australia) Tristan Bognar	(Australia) Alyssa Moody	4–2	(Mongolia) Enkhtsetseg Pürevdorj	
October 9–11	England International Open	Bronze	Seal Bay Resort	(England) Selsey	£2,750	(England) Jayden Walker	5–2	(England) Aaron Turner	(Netherlands) Anca Zijlstra	5–4	(England) Macy Gibbons	
October 10–11	England Masters	Silver	Seal Bay Resort	(England) Selsey	£7,210	(England) Archie Self	5–1	(England) Callum Francis	(England) Deta Hedman	5–1	(Scotland) Lorraine Hyde	
October 11	England Classic	Silver	Seal Bay Resort	(England) Selsey	£7,210	(England) Chas Barstow	5–0	(England) Robbie Martin	(England) Deta Hedman	5–3	(Scotland) Lorraine Hyde	
October 10–11	Klondike Open	Silver	River Cree Resort & Casino	(Canada) Enoch	C$10,140	(Canada) Rory Hansen	7–0	(Canada) Logan Crooks	(Canada) Maria Carli	5–1	(Canada) Roxanne Van Tassel	
October 11	Chinggis Open	Bronze	Triple Event Hall	(Mongolia) Ulaanbaatar	$2,694	(New Zealand) Mark Cleaver	6–1	(Japan) Hiroki Kaneko	(Japan) Mayumi Ouchi	5–3	(New Zealand) Nicole Regnaud	
October 14–16	Turkish Masters	Silver	Adora Hotel & Resort	(Turkey) Kadriye	€8,000	(England) Lewis Gurney	5–3	(Turkey) Mürsel Yavuz	(Finland) Kirsi Viinikainen	5–3	(Turkey) Emine Dursun	
October 15–16	Turkish Classic	Silver	Adora Hotel & Resort	(Turkey) Kadriye	€8,000	(England) Kaya Baysal	5–4	(Germany) Liam Maendl-Lawrance	(Finland) Kirsi Viinikainen	5–3	(Netherlands) Priscilla Steenbergen	
October 17	Thunder Bay Open	Bronze	Loyal Order of Moose Lodge	(Canada) Thunder Bay	C$3,400	(Canada) Shane Sakchekapo	5–0	(Canada) Aaron Stark	(Canada) Maria Carli	4–2	(Canada) Vanessa Abela	
October 16	Latvian Masters	Bronze	Bellevue Park Hotel	(Latvia) Riga	€3,400	(England) Paul Milford	6–1	(Sweden) Dennis Nilsson	(Netherlands) Aileen de Graaf	5–1	(Finland) Anu Rasmus	
October 17	Latvian Open	Silver	Bellevue Park Hotel	(Latvia) Riga	€8,000	(England) James Beeton	6–2	(England) Paul Milford	(Netherlands) Aileen de Graaf	5–3	(England) Joanne Oldershaw	
October 18	Riga Open	Bronze	Bellevue Park Hotel	(Latvia) Riga	€3,400	(Scotland) Scott Robertson	6–4	(England) Pat Scurfield	(Netherlands) Aileen de Graaf	5–2	(England) Joanne Oldershaw	
October 23	Hungarian Grand Prix	Bronze	Récsei Center	(Hungary) Budapest	€2,380	(Croatia) Boris Krčmar	5–2	(Germany) Paul Krohne	(Wales) Rhian O'Sullivan	5–2	(Czech Republic) Jitka Císařová	
October 24	Hungarian Classic	Silver	Récsei Center	(Hungary) Budapest	€8,000	(Germany) Carsten Hoffmann	5–1	(Germany) Paul Krohne	(Wales) Rhian O'Sullivan	5–2	(Netherlands) Priscilla Steenbergen	
October 25	Hungarian Masters	Gold	Récsei Center	(Hungary) Budapest	€16,150	(England) Matthew Edgar	6–4	(Wales) Sean Fisher	(Wales) Rhian O'Sullivan	5–0	(Netherlands) Aileen de Graaf	
October 24	Alan King Memorial	Bronze	Otago Darts Association	(New Zealand) Dunedin	NZ$4,280	(New Zealand) Haupai Puha	5–0	(New Zealand) Graeme Ryder	(New Zealand) Desi Mercer	5–1	(New Zealand) Olivia Curreen	
October 25	Victorian Classic	Silver	Mountain Districts Darts Association	(Australia) Dandenong South	AU$8,670	(Australia) Corey Fortington	5–4	(Australia) Barry Ledington	(Australia) Joanne Hadley	5–3	(Australia) Jucinta Dann	
October 31	Lakeside Open	Silver	Lakeside Country Club	(England) Frimley Green	£7,040	(England) Arthur Allston	5–3	(England) Lewis Gurney	(England) Gemma Hayter	5–4	(England) Macy Gibbons	

=== November ===
Date	Tournament	Cat.	Venue	City	Prize money	Open			Women's			Ref.
Date	Tournament	Cat.	Venue	City	Prize money	winner	score	runner-up	winner	score	runner-up	Ref.
November 1	WDF World Championship Qualifier UK (O/W); Open finalists (2) and women's winner (1) qualifies	WDF	Lakeside Country Club	(England) Frimley Green	n/a	(England) Paul Lewis			(England) Kim Holden			
November 1	WDF World Championship Qualifier UK (O/W); Open finalists (2) and women's winner (1) qualifies	WDF	Lakeside Country Club	(England) Frimley Green	n/a	(Netherlands) Jitse v d Wal			(England) Kim Holden			
November 1	WDF World Championship Qualifier UK (Y/G); Youth finalists (2) and girls winner (1) qualifies	WDF	Lakeside Country Club	(England) Frimley Green	n/a	(Northern Ireland) Christian Ennis			(Republic of Ireland) Rebecca Allen			
November 1	WDF World Championship Qualifier UK (Y/G); Youth finalists (2) and girls winner (1) qualifies	WDF	Lakeside Country Club	(England) Frimley Green	n/a	(England) Cori Wiltshire			(Republic of Ireland) Rebecca Allen			
November 7	Malta Masters	Silver	Salone Delle Rose	(Malta) Santa Luċija	€8,000	(England) Jenson Walker	5–2	(England) Nick Fullwell	(Poland) Karolina Ratajska	5–0	(Germany) Irina Armstrong	
November 8	Malta Open	Silver	Salone Delle Rose	(Malta) Santa Luċija	€8,000	(England) David Evans	5–0	(England) Cliff Prior	(Poland) Karolina Ratajska	5–4	(Netherlands) Anca Zijlstra	
November 13	Killarney Open	Silver	Gleneagle Hotel	(Republic of Ireland) Killarney	€8,840	(England) Harry Lane	5–0	(England) Callum Grealis	(England) Macy Gibbons	5–3	(Scotland) Lorraine Hyde	
November 14	Irish Open	Gold	Gleneagle Hotel	(Republic of Ireland) Killarney	€18,000	(Scotland) Ryan Hogarth	6–5	(Republic of Ireland) Gerard McGlynn	(Scotland) Lorraine Hyde	5–4	(Republic of Ireland) Rebecca Allen	
November 15	Irish Classic	Silver	Gleneagle Hotel	(Republic of Ireland) Killarney	€8,840	(England) Callum Francis	5–2	(Scotland) Ross Montgomery	(Wales) Rhian O'Sullivan	5–1	(Japan) Kosuzu Iwao	
November 15	Ted Clements Memorial	Bronze	Levin Cosmopolitan Club	(New Zealand) Levin	NZ$4,280	(New Zealand) Haupai Puha	5–1	(New Zealand) Josh Walters	(New Zealand) Nicole Regnaud	5–4	(New Zealand) Desi Mercer	
November 21	Seacoast Open	Silver	DoubleTree by Hilton	(United States) Manchester	$6,300	(United States) Alex Spellman	5–2	(United States) Leonard Gates	(United States) Cali West	5–1	(United States) Erin Sheehan	
November 22	Seacoast Classic	Silver	DoubleTree by Hilton	(United States) Manchester	$6,300	(Canada) Jeff Smith	5–3	(United States) Stephen Phillips	(United States) Tracy Feiertag	5–3	(United States) Aaja Jalbert	
November 21	Czech Open	Silver	OREA Hotel Pyramida	(Czech Republic) Prague	€10,400	(England) Jenson Walker	5–3	(England) Lewis Gurney	(Poland) Karolina Ratajska	5–3	(Netherlands) Anca Zijlstra	
November 22	Prague Open	Bronze	OREA Hotel Pyramida	(Czech Republic) Prague	€2,580	(Austria) Patrick Reisenegger	5–0	(Czech Republic) Jindřich Ulrych	(Finland) Kirsi Viinikainen	5–4	(Netherlands) Aileen de Graaf	
November 21–22	Fall Brawl Open	Bronze	AAS Hull-Volant	(Canada) Gatineau	C$3,100				(Canada) Naty Marchand	5–3	(Canada) Cathy Scharf-Matthews	
Nov. 27–Dec. 6	WDF World Championships (S)	Platinum	Lakeside Country Club	(England) Frimley Green	£209,000							
Nov. 27–Dec. 6	WDF World Championships (B/G)	Platinum	Lakeside Country Club	(England) Frimley Green	£14,500							

== Statistical information ==
The players/nations are sorted by:

1. Total number of titles;
2. Cumulated importance of those titles;
3. Alphabetical order (by family names for players).

=== Titles won by player (Open) ===
Total	Player	Category			
Total	Player	Platinum	Gold	Silver	Bronze
8	Jenson Walker (ENG)			● ● ● ● ●	● ● ●
5	Mitchell Lawrie (SCO)		●	● ● ●	●
5	Leonard Gates (USA)			● ● ●	● ●
5	Kaya Baysal (ENG)			● ●	● ● ●
5	Haupai Puha (NZL)				● ● ● ● ●
4	Moreno Blom (NED)			● ●	● ●
4	Neil Duff (NIR)			●	● ● ●
3	Paul Krohne (GER)	●		● ●	
3	Jeff Smith (CAN)		●	● ●	
3	Harry Lane (ENG)			● ● ●	
3	Jonny Tata (NZL)			● ● ●	
2	Chris Lim (USA)	●		●	
2	Ryan Hogarth (SCO)		●	●	
2	Mark Cleaver (NZL)		●		●
2	Terry Tan (MYS)		●		●
2	Declan Bailey (AUS)			● ●	
2	James Beeton (ENG)			● ●	
2	Carsten Hoffmann (GER)			● ●	
2	Alex Spellman (USA)			● ●	
2	Ryuta Arihara (JPN)			●	●
2	Corné Groeneveld (NED)			●	●
2	Ross Montgomery (SCO)			●	●
2	Scott Robertson (SCO)			●	●
2	Mürsel Yavuz (TUR)			●	●
2	Franko Giuliani (AUT)				● ●
2	Shane Sakchekapo (CAN)				● ●
1	Ryusei Azemoto (JPN)		●		
1	Jason Brandon (USA)		●		
1	Jack Drayton (ENG)		●		
1	Matthew Edgar (ENG)		●		
1	Blake Hatchett (AUS)		●		
1	Arthur Allston (ENG)			●	
1	Chas Barstow (ENG)			●	
1	András Borbély (HUN)			●	
1	Jarno Bottenberg (NED)			●	
1	Matt Clark (ENG)			●	
1	Christian Delos Reyes (PHI)			●	
1	David Evans (ENG)			●	
1	Corey Fortington (AUS)			●	
1	Callum Francis (ENG)			●	
1	Garrett French (USA)			●	
1	Tomoya Goto (JPN)			●	
1	Lewis Gurney (ENG)			●	
1	Rory Hansen (CAN)			●	
1	Caleb Hope (NZL)			●	
1	Robbie Phillips (USA)			●	
1	Stephen Phillips (USA)			●	
1	Brian Raman (BEL)			●	
1	Petri Rasmus (FIN)			●	
1	Ben Robb (NZL)			●	
1	Archie Self (ENG)			●	
1	Cayden Smith (ENG)			●	
1	Raymond Smith (AUS)			●	
1	Tokuyo Takayama (JPN)			●	
1	Graham Usher (ENG)			●	
1	Jaimy van de Weerd (GER)			●	
1	Jim Widmayer (USA)			●	
1	Daniel Zapata (CAT)			●	
1	Angelo Balsamo (ITA)				●
1	Anthony Brown (ENG)				●
1	Reece Colley (ENG)				●
1	Zsolt Csajbók (HUN)				●
1	Ethan De Veyra (USA)				●
1	Stuart Dutton (ENG)				●
1	Altangerel Gongor (MGL)				●
1	Danny Humphries (ENG)				●
1	László Kádár (ROM)				●
1	Brody Klinge (AUS)				●
1	Boris Krčmar (CRO)				●
1	Raido Kruusvee (EST)				●
1	Jani Laurila (FIN)				●
1	Jean-Michel Legault (CAN)				●
1	Paul Lewis (ENG)				●
1	Louis Lopez (PHI)				●
1	John Michael (GRE)				●
1	Paul Milford (ENG)				●
1	Dennis Nilsson (SWE)				●
1	Patrick Reisenegger (AUT)				●
1	Dmitrii Rogov (ISR)				●
1	Pat Scurfield (ENG)				●
1	Jack Sheppard (NZL)				●
1	Ky Smith (AUS)				●
1	Mark Stephenson (ENG)				●
1	Evan Suderman (CAN)				●
1	Davíð Svansson (ISL)				●
1	Aaron Turner (ENG)				●
1	Mike van Duivenbode (NED)				●
1	Timothy Verbrugghe (BEL)				●
1	Jayden Walker (ENG)				●

=== Titles won by nation (Open) ===
Total	Nation	Category			
Total	Nation	Platinum	Gold	Silver	Bronze
39	England (ENG)		● ●	● ● ● ● ● ● ● ● ● ● ● ● ● ● ● ● ● ● ● ● ●	● ● ● ● ● ● ● ● ● ● ● ● ● ● ● ●
15	United States (USA)	●	●	● ● ● ● ● ● ● ● ● ●	● ● ●
13	New Zealand (NZL)		●	● ● ● ● ●	● ● ● ● ● ● ●
12	Scotland (SCO)		● ●	● ● ● ● ● ● ●	● ● ●
8	Canada (CAN)		●	● ● ●	● ● ● ●
8	Netherlands (NED)			● ● ● ●	● ● ● ●
7	Australia (AUS)		●	● ● ● ●	● ●
6	Germany (GER)	●		● ● ● ● ●	
5	Japan (JPN)		●	● ● ●	●
4	Northern Ireland (NIR)			●	● ● ●
3	Austria (AUT)				● ● ●
2	Malaysia (MYS)		●		●
2	Belgium (BEL)			●	●
2	Finland (FIN)			●	●
2	Hungary (HUN)			●	●
2	Philippines (PHI)			●	●
2	Turkey (TUR)			●	●
1	Catalonia (CAT)			●	
1	Croatia (CRO)				●
1	Estonia (EST)				●
1	Greece (GRE)				●
1	Iceland (ISL)				●
1	Israel (ISR)				●
1	Italy (ITA)				●
1	Mongolia (MGL)				●
1	Romania (ROM)				●
1	Sweden (SWE)				●

=== Titles won by player (Women's) ===
Total	Player	Category			
Total	Player	Platinum	Gold	Silver	Bronze
11	Deta Hedman (ENG)		● ● ● ●	● ● ● ● ● ● ●	
8	Nicole Regnaud (NZL)		●	● ● ●	● ● ● ●
8	Maria Carli (CAN)			● ● ● ● ● ●	● ●
8	Kirsi Viinikainen (FIN)			● ● ● ● ● ●	● ●
7	Paula Jacklin (ENG)			● ● ● ●	● ● ●
7	Aileen de Graaf (NED)			● ● ●	● ● ● ●
6	Priscilla Steenbergen (NED)	●		● ●	● ● ●
6	Rhian O'Sullivan (WAL)		●	● ●	● ● ●
6	Jitka Císařová (CZE)			●	● ● ● ● ●
4	Gemma Hayter (ENG)	●	●	● ●	
3	Lovely-Mae Orbeta (PHI)		●	●	●
3	Mayumi Ouchi (JPN)		●	●	●
3	Karolina Ratajska (POL)			● ● ●	
3	Irina Armstrong (GER)			● ●	●
3	Anna Forsmark (SWE)			● ●	●
3	Anca Zijlstra (NED)			●	● ●
2	Christine Richardson (AUS)		●		●
2	Tracy Feiertag (USA)			● ●	
2	Vicky Pruim (SWE)			● ●	
2	Emine Dursun (TUR)			●	●
2	Paula Murphy (USA)			●	●
2	Margaret Sutton (ENG)			●	●
2	Maret Liiri (FIN)				● ●
2	Catalina Pasa (AUT)				● ●
2	Gréta Tekauer (HUN)				● ●
2	Amgalan Tsogbayar (MGL)				● ●
1	Lorraine Hyde (SCO)		●		
1	Rebecca Allen (IRE)			●	
1	Hayley Davis (AUS)			●	
1	Mahima Gautam (IND)			●	
1	Macy Gibbons (ENG)			●	
1	Natalie Gilbert (ENG)			●	
1	Joanne Hadley (AUS)			●	
1	Wendy Harper (NZL)			●	
1	Momoka Hayashi (JPN)			●	
1	Tracy MacDonald (NZL)			●	
1	Carolyn Mars (USA)			●	
1	Sophie McKinlay (SCO)			●	
1	Monica Ribeiro (AUS)			●	
1	Leanne Topper (WAL)			●	
1	Daphne Walters (NZL)			●	
1	Eve Watson (WAL)			●	
1	Cali West (USA)			●	
1	Lisa Ashton (ENG)				●
1	Popi Athanasiou (CYP)				●
1	Ornong Boonyanit (THA)				●
1	Rachna David (NOR)				●
1	Aurora Fochesato (ITA)				●
1	Brynja Herborg (ISL)				●
1	Nancy King (USA)				●
1	Marina Letica (CRO)				●
1	Naty Marchand (CAN)				●
1	Desi Mercer (NZL)				●
1	Brenda Moreau (CAN)				●
1	Evdokia Nakka (GRE)				●
1	Giulia Olteanu (ROM)				●
1	Shiori Sato (JPN)				●
1	Rachel Savage (AUS)				●
1	Kayla Smith (CAN)				●
1	Lisa Waerehu (NZL)				●

=== Titles won by nation (Women's) ===
Total	Nation	Category			
Total	Nation	Platinum	Gold	Silver	Bronze
27	England (ENG)	●	● ● ● ●	● ● ● ● ● ● ● ● ● ● ● ● ● ● ● ●	● ● ● ● ● ●
16	Netherlands (NED)	●		● ● ● ● ● ●	● ● ● ● ● ● ● ● ●
12	New Zealand (NZL)		●	● ● ● ● ●	● ● ● ● ● ●
11	Canada (CAN)			● ● ● ● ● ●	● ● ● ● ●
10	Finland (FIN)			● ● ● ● ● ●	● ● ● ●
8	Wales (WAL)		●	● ● ● ●	● ● ●
7	United States (USA)			● ● ● ● ●	● ●
6	Australia (AUS)		●	● ● ●	● ●
6	Czech Republic (CZE)			●	● ● ● ● ●
5	Japan (JPN)		●	● ●	● ●
5	Sweden (SWE)			● ● ● ●	●
3	Philippines (PHI)		●	●	●
3	Poland (POL)			● ● ●	
3	Germany (GER)			● ●	●
2	Scotland (SCO)		●	●	
2	Turkey (TUR)			●	●
2	Austria (AUT)				● ●
2	Hungary (HUN)				● ●
2	Mongolia (MGL)				● ●
1	India (IND)			●	
1	Ireland (IRE)			●	
1	Croatia (CRO)				●
1	Cyprus (CYP)				●
1	Greece (GRE)				●
1	Iceland (ISL)				●
1	Italy (ITA)				●
1	Norway (NOR)				●
1	Romania (ROM)				●
1	Thailand (THA)				●
