= 2026 World Series of Darts =

Series of darts tournament

The 2026 World Series of Darts is a series of televised darts tournaments organised by the Professional Darts Corporation. Six World Series events will be held followed by one finals event, which like every year since 2021 has taken place in Amsterdam, Netherlands.

One new event took place for the first time in 2026, with the Saudi Arabia Darts Masters taking place at the Global Theater in Riyadh, Saudi Arabia. However, the Dutch and Poland Darts Masters were both removed from the series, with the latter being scrapped due to a new event, the Poland Darts Open, being added to the European Tour schedule.

== Prize money ==
The total prize fund for each of the six World Series events was unchanged from the previous year at £100,000 per event. The total prize fund for the 2026 World Series of Darts Finals was increased from the previous year from £400,000 to £450,000. The prize fund breakdowns are shown below:

International events
Stage	Prize money	OoM points
Winner	£30,000	12
Runner-up	£16,000	8
Semi-finals	£10,000	5
Quarter-finals	£5,000	3
First round	£1,750	1
Total	£100,000	

Finals
Stage	Prize money
Winner	£100,000
Runner-up	£60,000
Semi-finals	£30,000
Quarter-finals	£17,500
Second round	£10,000
First round	£5,000
Total	£450,000

== World Series events ==
The 2026 World Series of Darts schedule was announced on 5 October 2025. The US Darts Masters was originally scheduled for 26 and 27 June, but was later moved to 25 and 26 June.

No.	Date	Event	Venue	Champion	Legs	Runner-up	Ref
1	15–16 January	Bahrain Masters	Sakhir, Exhibition World Bahrain	Michael van Gerwen 100.91	8–6	Gian van Veen 100.79	
2	19–20 January	Saudi Arabia Masters	(Saudi Arabia) Riyadh, Global Theater	Luke Littler 104.84	8–5	Michael van Gerwen 101.79	
3	5–6 June	Nordic Masters	(Denmark) Copenhagen, Forum Copenhagen	Michael van Gerwen 98.90	8–7	Luke Humphries 98.93	
4	25–26 June	US Masters	(United States) New York City, The Theater	Luke Humphries 104.05	8–7	Luke Littler 99.50	
5	14–15 August	New Zealand Masters	(New Zealand) Auckland, Spark Arena	Jonny Clayton 94.96	8–4	Gerwyn Price 95.49	
6	21–22 August	Australian Masters	(Australia) Wollongong, Wollongong Entertainment Centre	James Wade 101.62	8–5	Brody Klinge 104.56	
7	17–20 September	World Series of Darts Finals	(Netherlands) Amsterdam, AFAS Live	Ross Smith 103.89	11–5	Gerwyn Price 97.28	

== Order of Merit ==
The top 24 players on the 2026 World Series Order of Merit, based on points earned across the six events, will qualify for the 2026 World Series of Darts Finals.

#	Player	(Bahrain) BHR	(Saudi Arabia) KSA	(Denmark) DEN	(United States) USA	(New Zealand) NZL	(Australia) AUS	Total
1	Michael van Gerwen	W 12	F 8	W 12	—N/a	—N/a	—N/a	32
2	Gerwyn Price	SF; 5	SF; 5	QF; 3	QF; 3	F 8	SF; 5	29
3	Luke Littler	QF; 3	W 12	SF; 5	F 8	—N/a	—N/a	28
4	Luke Humphries	QF; 3	QF; 3	F 8	W 12	—N/a	—N/a	26
5	Gian van Veen	F 8	QF; 3	QF; 3	SF; 5	QF; 3	QF; 3	25
6	Jonny Clayton	—N/a	—N/a	SF; 5	QF; 3	W 12	SF; 5	25
7	James Wade	—N/a	—N/a	QF; 3	SF; 5	SF; 5	W 12	25
8	Stephen Bunting	QF; 3	QF; 3	1R; 1	QF; 3	1R; 1	QF; 3	14
9	Nathan Aspinall	SF; 5	SF; 5	—N/a	—N/a	—N/a	—N/a	10
10	Brody Klinge	—N/a	—N/a	—N/a	—N/a	—N/a	F 8	8
11	Josh Rock	—N/a	—N/a	—N/a	1R; 1	QF; 3	QF; 3	7
12	Damon Heta	—N/a	—N/a	—N/a	—N/a	QF; 3	QF; 3	6
13	Raymond Smith	—N/a	—N/a	—N/a	—N/a	SF; 5	1R; 1	6
14	Danny Noppert	QF; 3	1R; 1	—N/a	—N/a	—N/a	—N/a	4
15	Adam Leek	—N/a	—N/a	—N/a	—N/a	QF; 3	1R; 1	4
16	Man Lok Leung	1R; 1	QF; 3	—N/a	—N/a	—N/a	—N/a	4
17	Jim Long	—N/a	—N/a	—N/a	QF; 3	—N/a	—N/a	3
18	Viktor Tingström	—N/a	—N/a	QF; 3	—N/a	—N/a	—N/a	3
19	Ross Smith	—N/a	—N/a	—N/a	—N/a	1R; 1	1R; 1	2
20	Ben Robb	—N/a	—N/a	—N/a	—N/a	1R; 1	1R; 1	2
21	Motomu Sakai	1R; 1	1R; 1	—N/a	—N/a	—N/a	—N/a	2
22	Simon Whitlock	—N/a	—N/a	—N/a	—N/a	1R; 1	1R; 1	2
23	Lourence Ilagan	1R; 1	1R; 1	—N/a	—N/a	—N/a	—N/a	2
24	Alexis Toylo	1R; 1	1R; 1	—N/a	—N/a	—N/a	—N/a	2
25	Ryusei Azemoto	1R; 1	1R; 1	—N/a	—N/a	—N/a	—N/a	2
26	Paul Lim	1R; 1	1R; 1	—N/a	—N/a	—N/a	—N/a	2

Order of Merit finishers on 1 point
#	Player	(Bahrain) BHR	(Saudi Arabia) KSA	(Denmark) DEN	(United States) USA	(New Zealand) NZL	(Australia) AUS	Total
27	Madars Razma	—N/a	—N/a	1R; 1	—N/a	—N/a	—N/a	1
27	Jeffrey de Graaf	—N/a	—N/a	1R; 1	—N/a	—N/a	—N/a	1
27	Cor Dekker	—N/a	—N/a	1R; 1	—N/a	—N/a	—N/a	1
27	Oskar Lukasiak	—N/a	—N/a	1R; 1	—N/a	—N/a	—N/a	1
27	Darius Labanauskas	—N/a	—N/a	1R; 1	—N/a	—N/a	—N/a	1
27	Haupai Puha	—N/a	—N/a	—N/a	—N/a	1R; 1	—N/a	1
27	David Cameron	—N/a	—N/a	—N/a	1R; 1	—N/a	—N/a	1
27	Brayden Hall	—N/a	—N/a	—N/a	1R; 1	—N/a	—N/a	1
27	Mal Cuming	—N/a	—N/a	—N/a	—N/a	—N/a	1R; 1	1
27	Daniel Larsson	—N/a	—N/a	1R; 1	—N/a	—N/a	—N/a	1
27	Adam Sevada	—N/a	—N/a	—N/a	1R; 1	—N/a	—N/a	1
27	Joe Comito	—N/a	—N/a	—N/a	—N/a	—N/a	1R; 1	1
27	Gary Mawson	—N/a	—N/a	—N/a	1R; 1	—N/a	—N/a	1
27	Alex Spellman	—N/a	—N/a	—N/a	1R; 1	—N/a	—N/a	1
27	Tomoya Goto	—N/a	1R; 1	—N/a	—N/a	—N/a	—N/a	1
27	Jonny Tata	—N/a	—N/a	—N/a	—N/a	1R; 1	—N/a	1
27	Mark Cleaver	—N/a	—N/a	—N/a	—N/a	1R; 1	—N/a	1
27	Fred Krueger	—N/a	—N/a	—N/a	1R; 1	—N/a	—N/a	1
27	Nitin Kumar	—N/a	1R; 1	—N/a	—N/a	—N/a	—N/a	1
27	Leonard Gates	—N/a	—N/a	—N/a	1R; 1	—N/a	—N/a	1
27	Basem Mahmood	1R; 1	—N/a	—N/a	—N/a	—N/a	—N/a	1
27	Tim Pusey	—N/a	—N/a	—N/a	—N/a	—N/a	1R; 1	1
27	Andreas Harrysson	—N/a	—N/a	1R; 1	—N/a	—N/a	—N/a	1
27	Abdulla Saeed	1R; 1	—N/a	—N/a	—N/a	—N/a	—N/a	1
27	Kayden Milne	—N/a	—N/a	—N/a	—N/a	1R; 1	—N/a	1

Key

Performance Table Legend
W	Won the tournament	F	Finalist	SF	Semifinalist	QF	Quarterfinalist	#R; RR; L#	Lost in # round Round-robin; Last # stage	DQ	Disqualified
DNQ	Did not qualify	DNP	Did not participate	WD	Withdrew	NH	Tournament not held	#R; RR; L#	Lost in # round Round-robin; Last # stage	NYF	Not yet founded

== Top averages ==
The table lists all players who achieved an average of at least 100 in a match. In the case one player has multiple records, this is indicated by the number in brackets.

#	Player	Round	Average	Event	Result
1	James Wade	1st Round	112.73	(Australia) Australian Masters	Won
2	Luke Littler	Quarter Final	111.58	Saudi Arabia Masters	Won
3	Luke Humphries	1st Round	109.92	(Denmark) Nordic Masters	Won
4	Luke Littler (2)	1st Round	106.50	Bahrain Masters	Won
5	Danny Noppert	Quarter Final	106.47	Bahrain Masters	Lost
6	Gian van Veen	Quarter Final	106.45	(United States) US Masters	Won
7	Luke Humphries (2)	Quarter Final	105.70	(United States) US Masters	Won
8	Luke Humphries (3)	Semi Final	105.42	(Denmark) Nordic Masters	Won
9	Jonny Clayton	1st Round	104.86	(Denmark) Nordic Masters	Won
10	Luke Littler (3)	Final	104.84	Saudi Arabia Masters	Won
11	Brody Klinge	Final	104.56	(Australia) Australian Masters	Lost
12	Nathan Aspinall	Quarter Final	104.43	Bahrain Masters	Won
13	Gian van Veen (2)	Quarter Final	104.31	Bahrain Masters	Won
14	Gerwyn Price	Semi Final	104.07	(Netherlands) WS Finals	Won
15	Luke Humphries (4)	Final	104.05	(United States) US Masters	Won
16	Gerwyn Price (2)	1st Round	104.03	(Denmark) Nordic Masters	Won
17	Gerwyn Price (3)	Quarter Final	103.93	(United States) US Masters	Lost
18	Ross Smith	Final	103.89	(Netherlands) WS Finals	Won
19	Gerwyn Price (4)	Quarter Final	103.86	(Netherlands) WS Finals	Won
20	Luke Humphries (5)	1st Round	103.66	Bahrain Masters	Won
21	Karel Sedláček	2nd Round	103.30	(Netherlands) WS Finals	Lost
22	Ross Smith (2)	1st Round	102.98	(Netherlands) WS Finals	Won
23	Ross Smith (3)	1st Round	102.88	(Australia) Australian Masters	Lost
24	Stephen Bunting	Quarter Final	102.72	(United States) US Masters	Lost
25	Damon Heta	1st Round	102.39	(Australia) Australian Masters	Won
26	Luke Littler (4)	Quarter Final	102.15	(United States) US Masters	Won
27	James Wade (2)	Quarter Final	102.07	(United States) US Masters	Won
28	Josh Rock	1st Round	102.04	(Netherlands) WS Finals	Won
29	Michael van Gerwen	Final	101.79	Saudi Arabia Masters	Lost
30	Gerwyn Price (5)	Semi Final	101.63	Saudi Arabia Masters	Lost
31	James Wade (3)	Final	101.62	(Australia) Australian Masters	Won
32	Brody Klinge (2)	Semi Final	101.59	(Australia) Australian Masters	Won
33	Luke Humphries (6)	Semi Final	101.57	(United States) US Masters	Won
34	Michael van Gerwen (2)	Semi Final	101.55	(Denmark) Nordic Masters	Won
35	Gian van Veen (3)	2nd Round	101.52	(Netherlands) WS Finals	Won
36	James Wade (4)	2nd Round	101.40	(Netherlands) WS Finals	Won
37	Gerwyn Price (6)	Quarter Final	101.34	(Australia) Australian Masters	Won
38	James Wade (5)	Semi Final	101.27	(Australia) Australian Masters	Won
39	Dirk van Duijvenbode	2nd Round	101.14	(Netherlands) WS Finals	Won
40	Stephen Bunting (2)	1st Round	101.10	(Netherlands) WS Finals	Lost
41	Nathan Aspinall (2)	1st Round	100.93	Saudi Arabia Masters	Won
42	Michael van Gerwen (3)	Final	100.91	Bahrain Masters	Won
43	Luke Humphries (7)	Quarter Final	100.86	Bahrain Masters	Lost
44	Luke Littler (5)	Semi Final	100.85	(Denmark) Nordic Masters	Lost
45	Gian van Veen (4)	Final	100.79	Bahrain Masters	Lost
46	Ross Smith (4)	2nd Round	100.30	(Netherlands) WS Finals	Won
47	Michael van Gerwen (4)	Semi Final	100.28	Saudi Arabia Masters	Won
48	James Wade (6)	Semi Final	100.26	(United States) US Masters	Lost
49	Gerwyn Price (7)	1st Round	100.20	Saudi Arabia Masters	Won
