= 2026 New Zealand Darts Masters =

Darts tournament in New Zealand

2026 SkyCity New Zealand Darts Masters

Tournament information
- Dates: 14–15 August 2026
- Venue: Spark Arena
- Location: Auckland, New Zealand
- Organisation(s): Professional Darts Corporation (PDC)
- Format: Legs
- Prize fund: £100,000
- Winner's share: £30,000
- High checkout: 158 Jonny Clayton

Champion(s)
- Jonny Clayton (WAL)

The 2026 New Zealand Darts Masters (known for sponsorship reasons as the 2026 SkyCity New Zealand Darts Masters) was a professional darts tournament that took place from 14 to 15 August 2026 at the Spark Arena in Auckland, New Zealand. It was the sixth staging of the tournament by the Professional Darts Corporation (PDC), and was the fifth event in the 2026 World Series of Darts. The total prize fund is £100,000, with the winner receiving £30,000.

Sponsored by SkyCity, the tournament featured 16 players, consisting of eight PDC representatives and eight Oceanian representatives. Luke Littler was the reigning champion, having defeated Luke Humphries 8–4 in the 2025 final. However, Littler did not enter the tournament and therefore did not defend his title.

Jonny Clayton won his second World Series title by defeating Gerwyn Price 8–4 in the final, avenging his loss to Price by the same scoreline in the 2022 final.

== Overview ==
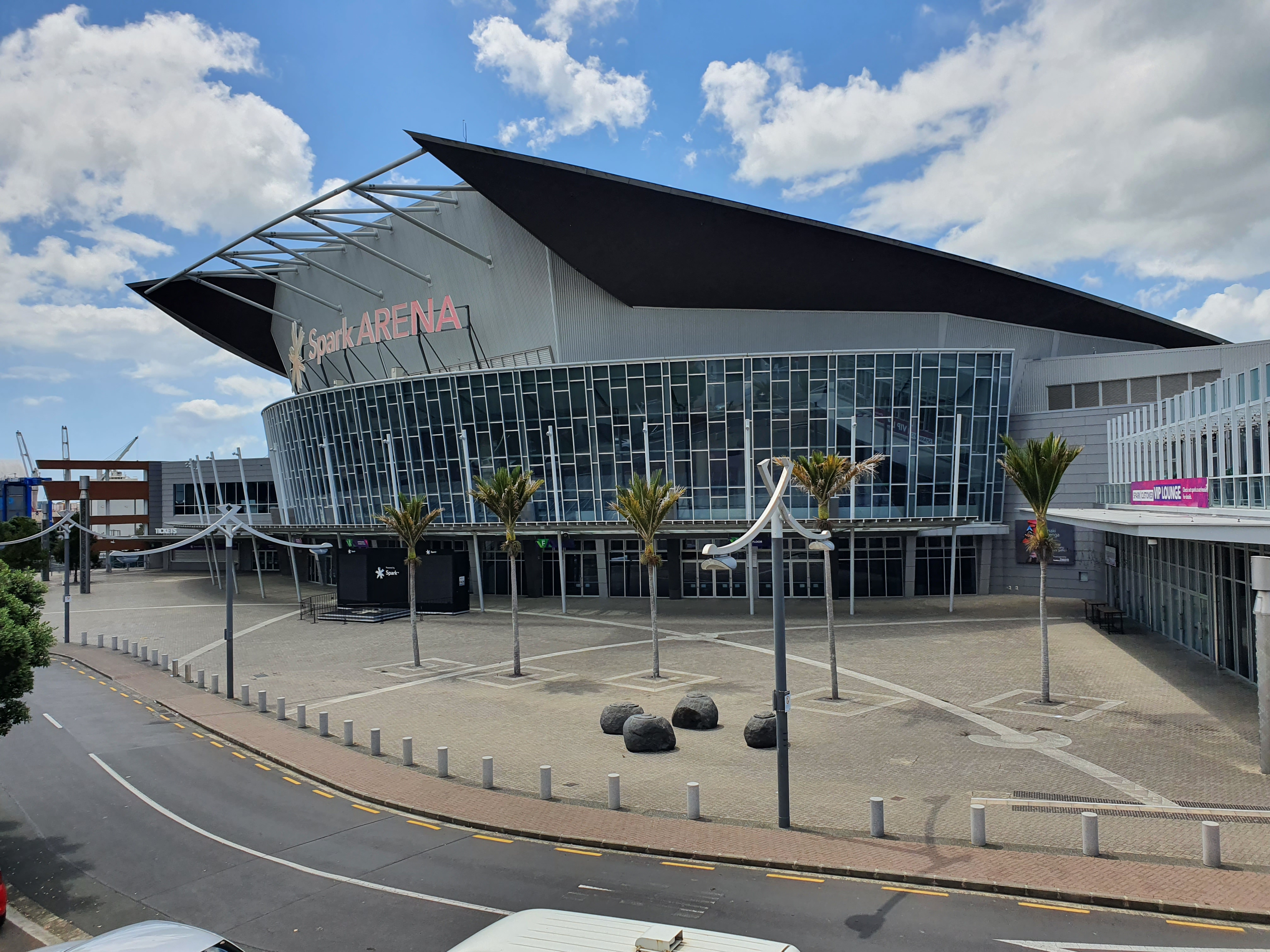
The event was held at the Spark Arena (pictured in 2022) in Auckland, New Zealand.

=== Format ===
Eight elite PDC representatives were drawn to play eight Oceanian representatives in the first round on Friday 14 August; the quarter-finals, semi-finals and final took place on Saturday 15 August.

- First round and quarter-finals: Best of eleven legs
- Semi-finals: Best of thirteen legs
- Final: Best of fifteen legs

=== Prize money ===
The total prize fund for the event remained at £100,000. The breakdown of prize money is shown below:

Position (no. of players)		Prize money (Total: £100,000)
Winner	(1)	£30,000
Runner-up	(1)	£16,000
Semi-finalists	(2)	£10,000
Quarter-finalists	(4)	£5,000
First round	(8)	£1,750

=== Broadcasts ===
The tournament was broadcast in ITV4 in the United Kingdom, Sky Sport in New Zealand and Fox Sports in Australia. Other broadcasters included DAZN in Germany, Austria, and Switzerland; Viaplay in the Netherlands, Iceland and Scandinavia; VTM in Belgium; Canal+ in Poland; Nova Sport in the Czech Republic and Slovakia; Network 4 Pragosport in Hungary; TV3 in the Baltic states; Zonasport in Croatia; Setanta in Ukraine; and Arena Sport in Bosnia and Herzegovina, Kosovo, Montenegro, North Macedonia and Serbia. It was also available for subscribers outside of Germany, Austria, Switzerland and Poland on the PDC's streaming service, PDCTV.

== Participants ==
The PDC announced the eight PDC representatives on 17 June 2026. Ross Smith made his World Series of Darts debut (excluding Finals), while world number two Gian van Veen made his first appearance Down Under. Reigning champion Luke Littler, who defeated Luke Humphries 8–4 in the 2025 final, did not enter the tournament.

The seedings were based on the 2026 World Series rankings after four events:

1. Gian van Veen (NED) (quarter-finals)
2. Gerwyn Price (WAL) (runner-up)
3. Stephen Bunting (ENG) (first round)
4. James Wade (ENG) (semi-finals)
5. Jonny Clayton (WAL) (champion)
6. Josh Rock (NIR) (quarter-finals)
7. Ross Smith (ENG) (first round)
8. Damon Heta (AUS) (quarter-finals)

The first two Oceanian representatives were also confirmed on 17 June: 2026 PDC Tour Card holder and World Series debutant Adam Leek, and reigning ANZ Premier League champion Simon Whitlock. They were joined by five Dartplayers New Zealand (DPNZ) qualifiers and one Australian Darts Association (ADA) qualifier.

Qualification	Player
PDC Tour Card holders	Adam Leek (AUS) (quarter-finals)
ANZ Premier League Champion	Simon Whitlock (AUS) (first round)
DPNZ qualifiers	Ben Robb (NZL) (first round)
DPNZ qualifiers	Jonny Tata (NZL) (first round)
DPNZ qualifiers	Mark Cleaver (NZL) (first round)
DPNZ qualifiers	Kayden Milne (NZL) (first round)
DPNZ qualifiers	Haupai Puha (NZL) (first round)
ADA qualifier	Raymond Smith (AUS) (semi-finals)

== Summary ==
=== First round ===
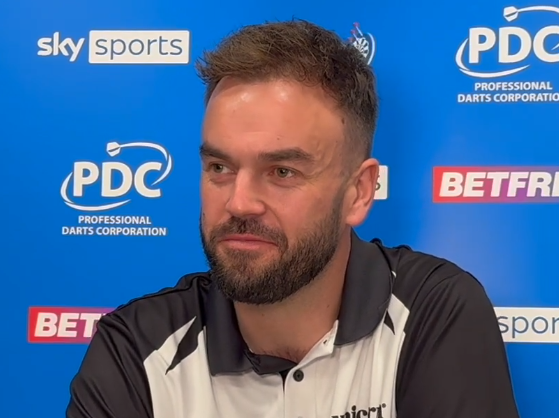
Ross Smith (pictured in 2024) lost 6–5 to Oceanian representative Adam Leek after missing six match darts.

The first round (best of 11 legs) was played on 14 August. Six of the eight PDC representatives were victorious in the opening round. Third seed Stephen Bunting was beaten 6–2 by Australia's Raymond Smith. Smith, who finished the match with a three-dart average of 99.81 and a checkout success rate of 86 per cent, won the last five legs of the contest and completed his victory with a 124 checkout on the bullseye. "It feels pretty awesome," said Smith, also highlighting the PDC's investment into darts in Oceania and how it had shown its effect. Fellow Australian Adam Leek staged a comeback from 4–1 down against Ross Smith. The two World Series debutants went to a deciding leg, where Leek secured a 6–5 victory after Smith missed a total of six match darts. Setting up an all-Australian quarter-final meeting with Raymond Smith, Leek called the win "the best feeling in the world" and "a dream come true".

Top seed Gian van Veen marked his first appearance Down Under with a 6–1 win against Jonny Tata, while 2022 champion and second seed Gerwyn Price defeated Mark Cleaver by the same scoreline. Damon Heta and Jonny Clayton overturned deficits of 6–1 and 6–2 in their respective victories over Ben Robb and Haupai Puha. Fourth seed James Wade earned a whitewash win against Kayden Milne, while Josh Rock beat Simon Whitlock 6–4 in a rematch of their meeting at the 2025 Australian Darts Masters.

=== Quarter-finals, semi-finals and final ===
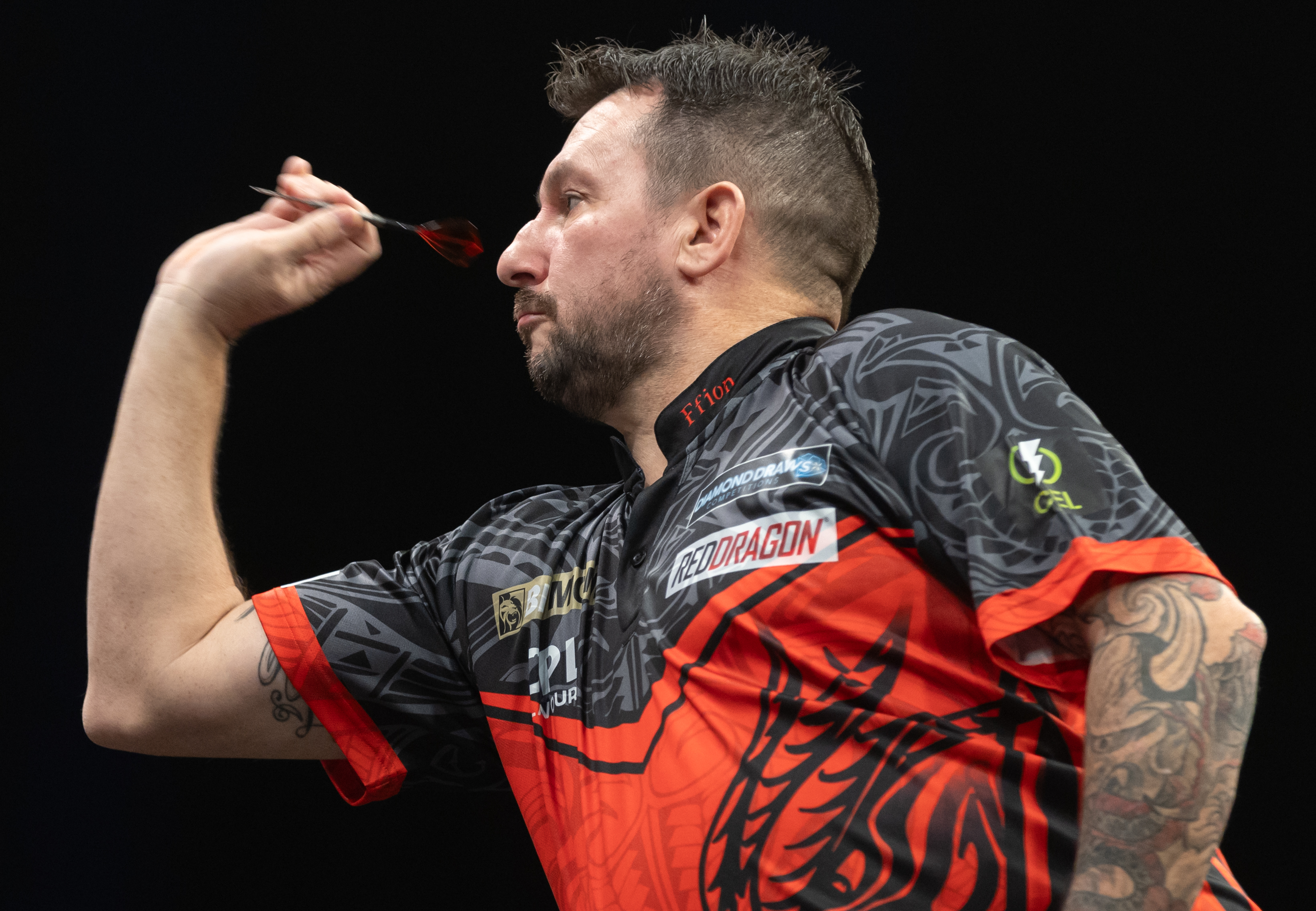
In a rematch of the 2022 final, Jonny Clayton (pictured in 2026) won his second World Series title by defeating Gerwyn Price 8–4.

The quarter-finals (best of 11 legs), semi-finals (best of 13 legs) and final (best of 15 legs) were played on 15 August. Gian van Veen was eliminated by Jonny Clayton, who hit six of his seven attempts at double to defeat the top seed 6–3. James Wade completed a 6–4 win over Josh Rock with a 12-dart break of throw. Gerwyn Price secured a place in the last four by defeating Australian number one Damon Heta 6–2, while Raymond Smith beat compatriot Adam Leek 6–3. Clayton converted checkouts of 135 and 118 on his way to defeating Wade 7–2 in the first semi-final. Price went seven darts into a nine-dart finish attempt in the eighth leg of his semi-final with Smith, eventually winning 7–2 to progress to an all-Welsh final against Clayton. A rematch of Price's 8–4 victory over Clayton in the 2022 final, Price was looking to win his fifth World Series title, while Clayton aimed to win his second.

Clayton converted a 158 checkout to take a 3–0 lead in the opening stages of the final. He hit further finishes of 80 and 62 as he went 5–1 in front heading into the interval. Missed doubles from Price allowed Clayton to extend his lead to 7–1. The next three legs saw Clayton miss chances to win the final, including him opting to leave a different finish rather than attempting a title-winning bullseye in the tenth leg, as Price reduced the deficit to 7–4. In the twelfth leg, Clayton secured an 8–4 victory with a 124 checkout on the bullseye. Clayton finished the match with a three-dart average of 94.96, compared to Price's 95.49.

Clayton won the New Zealand Darts Masters for the first time for his second World Series title, adding to his victory at the 2022 New South Wales Darts Masters. "It just shows that two rugby boys can play darts, and to play against each other in the world of rugby here in New Zealand, I've got a smile on my face," said Clayton about facing Price, noting that they were now even in New Zealand finals, to which he proclaimed, "It's 1–1 now, so next year—winner takes all!" Speaking in defeat, Price lamented his missed doubles during the contest and said that Clayton "played brilliantly", promising to "be even better next week in Australia".

== Draw ==
The draw was announced on 13 August. Numbers to the left of players' names show the seedings for the top four in the tournament. The figures to the right of a player's name state their three-dart average in a match. Players in bold denote match winners.

**First round** (best of 11 legs); 14 August
**1**	**Gian van Veen 97.21**	**6**
Jonny Tata 84.85	1
**Jonny Clayton 86.24**	**6**
Haupai Puha 89.05	5
**4**	**James Wade 87.55**	**6**
Kayden Milne 68.03	0
**Josh Rock 92.62**	**6**
Simon Whitlock 83.64	4
**2**	**Gerwyn Price 95.27**	**6**
Mark Cleaver 81.74	1
**Damon Heta 97.13**	**6**
Ben Robb 87.33	4
3	Stephen Bunting 99.30	2
**Raymond Smith 99.81**	**6**
Ross Smith 88.79	5
**Adam Leek 87.82**	**6**

**Quarter-finals** (best of 11 legs); 15 August
1	Gian van Veen 95.11	3
**Jonny Clayton 90.64**	**6**
**4**	**James Wade 95.03**	**6**
Josh Rock 86.43	4
**2**	**Gerwyn Price 97.19**	**6**
Damon Heta 90.83	2
**Raymond Smith 96.72**	**6**
Adam Leek 93.35	3

**Semi-finals** (best of 13 legs); 15 August
**Jonny Clayton 98.93**	**7**
4	James Wade 90.26	2
**2**	**Gerwyn Price 93.31**	**7**
Raymond Smith 92.35	2

**Final** (best of 15 legs); 15 August
**Jonny Clayton 94.96**	**8**
2	Gerwyn Price 95.49	4
