= 2026 WDF World Darts Championship =

Darts tournament

Tournament information
- Dates: 27 November – 6 December 2026
- Venue: Lakeside Country Club
- Location: Frimley Green, Surrey, England
- Organisation(s): World Darts Federation (WDF)
- Format: Sets
- Prize fund: £223,500 (total)
- Winner's share: £50,000 (open); £25,000 (women); £3,250 (youth); £1,650 (girls)

The 2026 WDF World Darts Championship is an upcoming darts tournament that will be held from 27 November to 6 December 2026 at the Lakeside Country Club in Frimley Green, Surrey, England. It is the fifth World Darts Championship to be organised by the World Darts Federation since it succeeded the now-defunct British Darts Organisation. The open tournament, women's tournament, youth tournament, and girls' tournament will share a total prize fund of £223,500, with the open champion receiving the biggest winner's prize of £50,000.

In the senior competitions, Jimmy van Schie is the reigning open champion after beating Mitchell Lawrie 6–3 in the 2025 open final; however, Van Schie is unable to defend his title after winning a PDC Tour Card in January 2026. Deta Hedman is the defending women's champion, having defeated Lerena Rietbergen 4–1 in the 2025 women's final. In the youth competitions, Lawrie is the defending world youth champion, having beaten Florian Preis 4–2 in the 2025 final while Zehra Gemi is the defending girls' world champion, having won the 2025 final 3–0 against Rebecca Allen.

== Prize money ==
A total of £223,500 will be on offer across the four events. The prize fund for the open and women's event remained the same as 2024 and 2025. The winner of the open event receives the highest prize of £50,000.

| Position | Prize money | | | |
| Position | Open | Women | Youth | Girls |
|---|---|---|---|---|
| Winner | £50,000 | £25,000 | £3,250 | £1,650 |
| Runner-up | £16,000 | £8,000 | £1,600 | £1,000 |
| Semi-finalist | £8,000 | £4,000 | £1,000 | £500 |
| Quarter-finalist | £4,000 | £2,000 | £500 | £300 |
| Last 16 | £2,000 | £1,000 | £350 | —N/a |
| Last 24 | —N/a | £750 | —N/a | —N/a |
| Last 32 | £1,250 | —N/a | —N/a | —N/a |
| Last 48 | £750 | —N/a | —N/a | —N/a |
| Event totals | £146,000 | £63,000 | £10,250 | £4,250 |
| Overall total | £223,500 | | | |

== Open ==
=== Open – Format and qualifiers ===
The open event consists of 48 players. Qualification for the event followed these criteria:

1. Top 16 players in the WDF World Championship race table (seeded in the second round)
2. Winners of the Platinum/Gold ranked tournaments
3. First and second-ranked players from each of the nine regional tables
4. Four qualifiers from the last-chance qualification tournaments (two in Las Vegas and two at Lakeside)
5. Next highest-ranked players in the WDF World Championship race table to bring the total entry list to 48

The list of participants is shown below:

1–16 in WDF rankings
Seeded in second round

1. Mitchell Lawrie (SCO)
2. Jenson Walker (ENG)
3. ~~Paul Krohne (GER)~~ (Note: Paul Krohne withdrew from the tournament after qualifying for the 2027 PDC World Darts Championship. He was replaced by Chas Barstow.)
4. Leonard Gates (USA)
5. James Beeton (ENG)
6. Matthew Edgar (ENG)
7. Moreno Blom (NED)
8. Kaya Baysal (TUR)
9. Mürsel Yavuz (TUR)
10. Ross Montgomery (SCO)
11. Corné Groeneveld (NED)
12. Jarno Bottenberg (NED)
13. Chris Lim (USA)
14. Brian Raman (BEL)
15. Neil Duff (NIR)
16. Scott Robertson (SCO)

Platinum/Gold event winners
First round

- David Davies (WAL)
- ~~Jack Drayton (ENG)~~ (Note: Jack Drayton withdrew from the tournament after qualifying for the 2027 PDC World Darts Championship. He was replaced by Aaron Turner.)
- Jeff Smith (CAN)
- Ryūsei Azemoto (JPN)
- Mark Cleaver (NZL)
- Blake Hatchett (AUS)
- Terry Tan (MYS)

Regional table qualifiers
First round

- Tomoya Gotō (JPN)
- Declan Bailey (AUS)
- Shane Sakchekapo (CAN)
- Franko Giuliani (AUT)
- Haupai Puha (NZL)
- Petri Rasmus (FIN)
- Dennis Nilsson (SWE)
- Harry Lane (ENG)
- Joey Lynaugh (USA)
- Daniel Zapata (CAT)

Las Vegas qualifiers
First round

- Berry Pater (NED)
- Liam Maendl-Lawrance (GER)

Lakeside qualifiers
First round

- Jitse van der Wal (NED)
- Paul Lewis (ENG)

Race table qualifiers
First round

- Carsten Hoffmann (GER)
- Ben Townley (ENG)
- Stefan Schroder (NED)
- Lewis Gurney (ENG)
- Sean Fisher (WAL)
- Matt Clark (ENG)
- Alex Williams (WAL)
- Anthony Brown (ENG)
- Dmitrii Rogov (ISR)
- Pat Scurfield (ENG)
- Ron Meulenkamp (NED)

Reserve players
First round

- Aaron Turner (ENG)
- Chas Barstow (ENG)

=== Open draw ===
The draw was broadcast on the WDF's YouTube channel on 3 November.

First round (best of 5 sets)
Harry Lane
Declan Bailey
Alex Williams
Dmitrii Rogov
Stefan Schröder
Pat Scurfield
Daniel Zapata
Alt | Aaron Turner
Ben Townley
Shane Sakchekapo
Franko Giuliani
Joey Lynaugh
Petri Rasmus
Ryusei Azemoto
Q | Liam Maendl-Lawrance
Q | Berry Pater
Mark Cleaver
Blake Hatchett
Lewis Gurney
Ron Meulenkamp
Carsten Hoffmann
Dennis Nilsson
Sean Fisher
Q | Jitse van der Wal
Matt Clark
Terry Tan
Anthony Brown
Q | Paul Lewis
Haupai Puha
Tomoya Goto
Jeff Smith
David Davies

Second round (best of 5 sets)
1 | Mitchell Lawrie
16 | Scott Robertson
8 | Kaya Baysal
9 | Mürsel Yavuz
4 | Leonard Gates
13 | Chris Lim
5 | James Beeton
12 | Jarno Bottenberg
2 | Jenson Walker
15 | Neil Duff
7 | Moreno Blom
10 | Ross Montgomery
Alt | Chas Barstow
14 | Brian Raman
(England)
6 | Matthew Edgar
11 | Corné Groeneveld

Third round (best of 5 sets)

Quarter-finals (best of 7 sets)

Semi-finals (best of 9 sets)

Final (best of 11 sets)

== Women ==
=== Women – Format and qualifiers ===
The women's event consists of 24 players. Qualification for the event followed these criteria:

1. Top 8 players in the WDF World Championship race table (seeded in the second round)
2. Winners of the Platinum/Gold ranked tournaments
3. Highest-ranked players from each of the ten regional tables
4. Two qualifiers from the last-chance qualification tournaments (one in Las Vegas and one at Lakeside)
5. Next highest-ranked players in the WDF World Championship race table to bring the total entry list to 24

The list of participants is shown below:

1–8 in WDF rankings
Seeded in second round

- Deta Hedman (ENG)
- Rhian O'Sullivan (WAL)
- Priscilla Steenbergen (NED)
- Maria Carli (CAN)
- Kirsi Viinikainen (FIN)
- Paula Jacklin (ENG)
- Aileen de Graaf (NED)
- Nicole Regnaud (NZL)

Platinum/Gold event winners
First round

- Mayumi Ouchi (JPN)
- Christine Richardson (AUS)
- ~~Lovely-Mae Orteba (PHI)~~ (Note: Lovely-Mae Orbeta withdrew from the tournament due to visa issues. She was replaced by Desi Mercer.)

Regional table qualifiers
First round

- Jitka Cisarova (CZE)
- Cali West (USA)
- Irina Armstrong (GER)

Las Vegas qualifier
First round

- Sophie McKinlay (SCO)

Lakeside qualifier
First round

- Kim Holden (ENG)

Race table qualifiers
First round

- Lerena Rietbergen (NED)
- Emine Dursun (TUR)
- Anca Zijlstra (NED)
- Lorraine Hyde (SCO)
- Aurora Fochesato (ITA)
- Paula Murphy (USA)
- Eve Watson (WAL)
- Steph Clarke (ENG)

Reserve players
First round

- Desi Mercer (NZL)

=== Women's draw ===
The draw was confirmed on 3 November.

First round (best of 3 sets)
Cali West
Alt | Desi Mercer
Irina Armstrong
Chris Richardson
Lorraine Hyde
Mayumi Ouchi
Aurora Fochesato
Steph Clarke
Emine Dursun
Q | Kim Holden
Lerena Rietbergen
Q | Sophie McKinlay
Jitka Císařová
Eve Watson
Anca Zijlstra
Paula Murphy

Second round (best of 3 sets)
1 | Deta Hedman
8 | Nicole Regnaud
4 | Maria Carli
5 | Kirsi Viinikainen
2 | Rhian O'Sullivan
7 | Aileen de Graaf
3 | Priscilla Steenbergen
6 | Paula Jacklin

Quarter-finals (best of 5 sets)

Semi-finals (best of 5 sets)

Final (best of 7 sets)

== Youth ==
=== Youth – Format and qualifiers ===
The open youth event consists of 12 players. Qualification for the event followed these criteria:

1. Winner of the 2025 WDF Youth World Championship
2. Winner of the 2026 WDF Youth World Masters
3. Next six highest-ranked players in the WDF World Championship race table
4. Four qualifiers from the last-chance qualification tournaments (two in Las Vegas and two at Lakeside)

The list of participants is shown below:

1–4 in WDF rankings
Seeded in quarter-finals

1. Mitchell Lawrie (SCO) (2025 WDF Youth World Championship winner)
2. Kaya Baysal (TUR)
3. Kai Burger (NED)
4. Mason Teese (ENG)

Unseeded players
First round

- Jack Nankervis (ENG)
- Mika Donnevert (GER)
- Toby Clements (ENG)
- Ben Townley (ENG) (Las Vegas qualifier)
- Addison Hefferon (ENG) (Las Vegas qualifier)
- Benjamin Dopfer (GER) (2026 WDF Youth World Masters winner)
- Cori Wiltshire (ENG) (Lakeside qualifier)
- Christian Ennis (NIR) (Lakeside qualifier)

=== Youth draw ===
The draw was confirmed on 3 November.

First round (best of 3 sets)
(England) Jack Nankervis
Q | (England) Cori Wiltshire
Q | Ben Townley
Q | (England) Addison Hefferon
(England) Toby Clements
Q | (Northern Ireland) Christian Ennis
(Germany) Mika Donnevert
(Germany) Benjamin Dopfer

Quarter-finals (best of 3 sets)
1 | Mitchell Lawrie
(England)
4 | Mason Teese
Q | (England)
2 | Kaya Baysal
3 | (Netherlands) Kai Burger
(Germany)

Semi-Finals (best of 5 sets)
(England)

Final (best of 7 sets)

== Girls ==
=== Girls – Format and qualifiers ===
The girls' event consists of six players. Qualification for the event followed these criteria:

1. Winner of the 2025 WDF Girls' World Championship
2. Winner of the 2026 WDF Girls' World Masters
3. Next two highest-ranked players in the WDF World Championship race table
4. Two qualifiers from the last-chance qualification tournaments (one in Las Vegas and one at Lakeside)

The list of participants is shown below:

1–2 in WDF rankings
Seeded in semi-finals

1. Paige Pauling (ENG)
2. Macy Gibbons (ENG)

Unseeded players
First round

- Ruby Grey (ENG) (2026 WDF Girls' World Masters winner)
- Zehra Gemi (TUR) (2025 WDF Girls' World Championship winner)
- Rebecca Allen (IRL) (Lakeside qualifier)
- Celina Glaser (AUT) (Las Vegas qualifier)

=== Girls' draw ===
The draw was confirmed on 3 November.

First round (best of 3 sets)
Ruby Grey
Q | Rebecca Allen
Zehra Gemi
Q | (Austria) Celina Glaser

Semi-finals (best of 3 sets)
1 | Paige Pauling
2 | (England) Macy Gibbons

Final (best of 5 sets)
