= Hong Kong Open (darts) =

Tournament information
- Venue: KITEC
- Location: Hong Kong
- Country: Hong Kong
- Established: 1989
- Organisation(s): HKDA; BDO, no category WDF category 2
- Format: Legs
- Prize fund: HK$39,000
- Month(s) Played: November

Current champion(s)
- (Hong Kong) Kai Fan Leung (Men's) (Japan) Mikuru Suzuki (Women's)

The Hong Kong Open is a darts tournament held in Kowloon, Hong Kong, currently sanctioned by the World Darts Federation. It was established in 1989, being one of the oldest and important darts tournament in the East Asia region.

== List of winners ==
=== Men's ===
Year	Champion	Score	Runner-up	Total Prize Money	Champion	Runner-up
1989	(Hong Kong) Robert-Steve Davies	beat	(Japan) Takao Tanida			
1990	(Philippines) Ding Sumulong	beat	(Hong Kong) Chris Parsonson			
1991	(Hong Kong) Paul Shek	beat	(Hong Kong) Simon Tan			
1992	(Hong Kong) Kendy Lo	beat	(Hong Kong) Jose Lo			
1993	(Philippines) Andrew Arrieta	beat	(Philippines) Manolito Diaz			
1994	(Hong Kong) Henry Ho	beat	(Japan) Hiroshi Watanobe			
1995	(Hong Kong) Bob Dover	beat	(Hong Kong) Kieran Marsland			
1996	(Hong Kong) Henry Ho	beat	(Philippines) Alfredo Sanchez			
1997	(Philippines) Gale Santos	beat	(Hong Kong) Henry Ho			
2002	(Thailand) Thanawat Yong	beat	(Malaysia) Choon Peng Lee			
2003	(Philippines) Benedicto Ybanez	beat	(Hong Kong) Henry Ho			
2004	(Hong Kong) Alex Hon	beat	(Thailand) Thanawat Yong			
2005	(Philippines) Joel Hizon	beat	(Thailand) Thanawat Yong	HK$11,000	HK$5,000	HK$2,000
2007	(Philippines) Joel Hizon (2)	beat	(Singapore) Alex Decay	HK$11,000	HK$5,000	HK$2,000
2008	(China) Lau Cheng-On	beat	(China) Shi Yongsheng	HK$11,000	HK$5,000	HK$2,000
2009	(Hong Kong) Royden Lam	beat	(China) Chengan Liu	HK$11,000	HK$5,000	HK$2,000
2010	(Hong Kong) Scott MacKenzie	beat	(Russia) Lev Kuzmichev	HK$16,500	HK$8,000	HK$4,000
2011	(Philippines) Edward Santos	5 – 4	(Netherlands) Michael Swart	HK$16,500	HK$8,000	HK$4,000
2012	(Philippines) Ryan Ocampo	beat	(Hong Kong) Alex Hon	HK$18,500	HK$10,000	HK$5,000
2013	(Philippines) Lourence Ilagan	5 – 1	(Philippines) Edward Santos	HK$18,500	HK$10,000	HK$5,000
2014	(Philippines) Juanito Gionson	5 – 4	(Japan) Seigo Asada	HK$37,000	HK$16,000	HK$8,000
2015	Scott MacKenzie (darts player) 80.34	5 – 1	Alex Hon 72.39	HK$26,000	HK$12,000	HK$6,000
2016	Paolo Nebrida 72.60	5 – 1	Thanawat Yong 72.81	HK$26,000	HK$12,000	HK$6,000
2017	Gilbert Ulang 76.71	5 – 3	Andreas Harrysson 71.85	HK$26,000	HK$12,000	HK$6,000
2018	Kai Fan Leung 93.44	5 – 1	Man Lok Leung 81.57	HK$26,000	HK$12,000	HK$6,000
2019	Kai Fan Leung 80.81 (2)	5 – 0	Joe Ng 78.40	HK$26,000	HK$12,000	HK$6,000
2024	Pupo Teng Lieh 80.47	5 – 1	Ho-Yin Shek 74.11	HK$26,000	HK$12,000	HK$6,000

=== Women's ===
Year	Champion	Score	Runner-up	Total Prize Money	Champion	Runner-up
1989	(Hong Kong) Donna Davies	beat	(Hong Kong) Ainky Lam			
2002	(Hong Kong) Chan-Hoi Yan	beat	(Hong Kong) Royce Chan			
2003	(Hong Kong) Penny Lam	beat	(Hong Kong) Apple Ho			
2004	(Hong Kong) Cindy Chan	beat	(Hong Kong) Nam Wan			
2005	(Singapore) Christina Koh	beat	(Hong Kong) Nam Wan			
2007	(Hong Kong) Joanna Shih	beat	(Hong Kong) Barbara Wong			
2008	(Hong Kong) Nam Wan	beat	(Hong Kong) Rain Wong			
2009	(Hong Kong) Nam Wan	beat	(Singapore) Alice Koh			
2010	(Hong Kong) Nam Wan	beat	(China) Leng Li			
2011	(Japan) Mayumi Ouchi	beat	(Hong Kong) Fanny Cheung			
2012	(Hong Kong) Tina Chan	beat	(China) Sherry Shi			
2013	(China) Xue Yun Zhan	4 – 1	(Hong Kong) Fanny Cheung			
2014	(Japan) Mayumi Ouchi	4 – 2	(England) Deta Hedman			
2015	Mikuru Suzuki 71.58	4 – 0	Sayaka Kameo 62.97			
2016	Sayaka Kameo 63.42	4 – 3	Arcy Tang 56.37			
2017	Mikuru Suzuki 69.09	4 – 2	Sayaka Kameo 63.87			
2018	Mikuru Suzuki 82.42	4 – 1	Areum Kim 69.28	HK$13,000	HK$6,000	HK$3,000
2019	Li Yi Hong 59.68	4 – 3	Vivienne Lee 61.65	HK$13,000	HK$6,000	HK$3,000
2024	Hebe Liang 58.75	4 – 1	Shuk Kwan Au 58.61	HK$13,000	HK$6,000	HK$3,000
