= 2026 Australian Darts Masters =

Darts tournament in Australia

2026 KenoGO Australian Darts Masters

Tournament information
- Dates: 21–22 August 2026
- Venue: WIN Entertainment Centre
- Location: Wollongong, Australia
- Organisation(s): Professional Darts Corporation (PDC)
- Format: Legs
- Prize fund: £100,000
- Winner's share: £30,000
- High checkout: 170 Brody Klinge

Champion(s)
- James Wade (ENG)

The 2026 Australian Darts Masters (known for sponsorship reasons as the 2026 KenoGO Australian Darts Masters) is a professional darts tournament that took place from 21 to 22 August 2026 at the WIN Entertainment Centre in Wollongong, Australia. It was the third staging of the tournament by the Professional Darts Corporation (PDC), and was the sixth and final event in the 2026 World Series of Darts before the World Series Finals. The total prize fund was £100,000, with the winner receiving £30,000.

The tournament featured 16 players, consisting of eight PDC representatives and eight Oceanian representatives. Luke Littler was the reigning champion, having defeated Mike De Decker 8–4 in the 2025 final. However, Littler did not enter the tournament and therefore did defend his title.

James Wade won his first World Series title by defeating Brody Klinge 8–5 in the final. Klinge became the first Oceanian qualifier to reach a World Series final since Damon Heta at the 2019 Brisbane Darts Masters.

== Overview ==
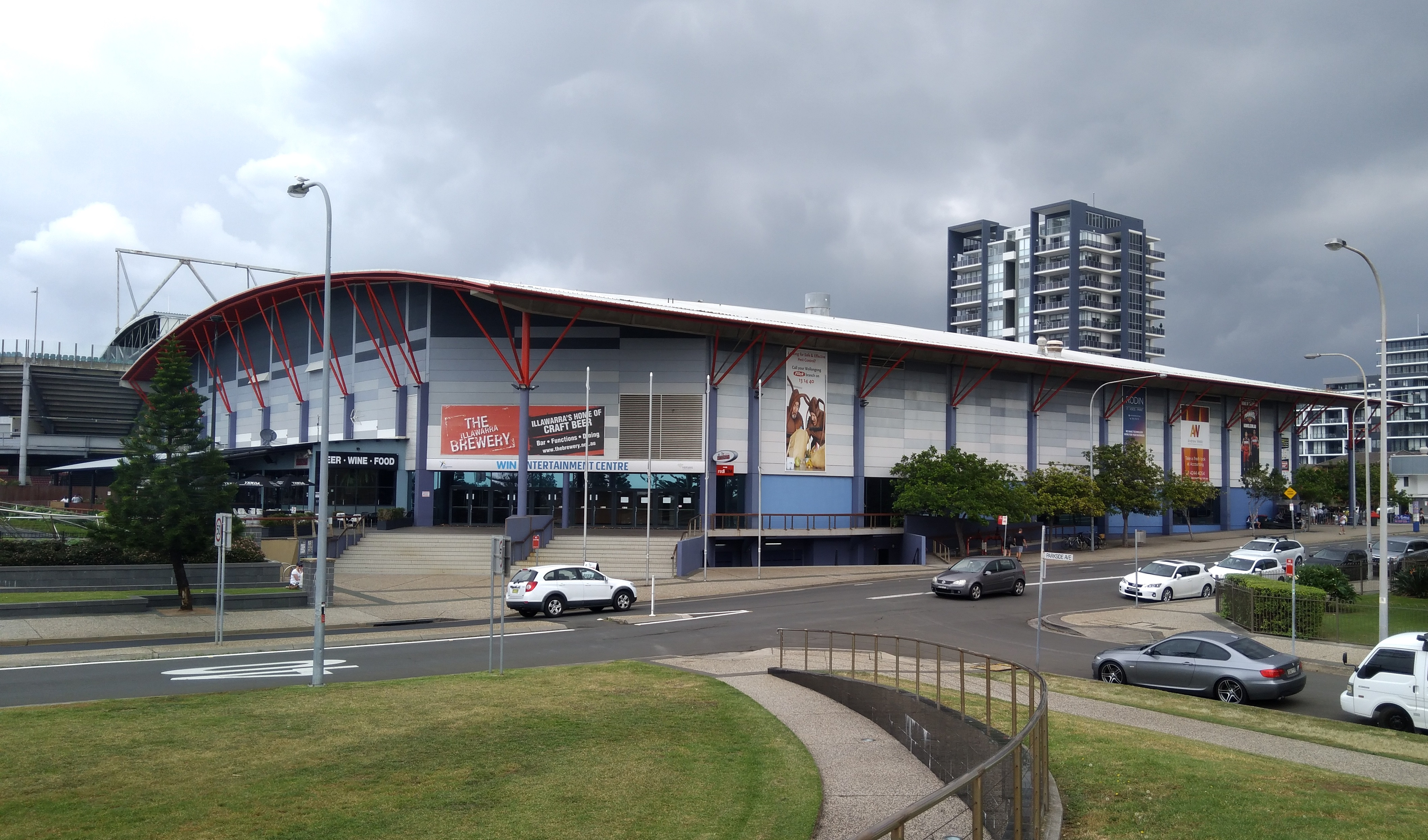
The event was held at the WIN Entertainment Centre (pictured in 2018) in Wollongong, Australia.

=== Format ===
Eight elite PDC representatives were drawn to play eight Oceanian representatives in the first round on Friday 21 August; the quarter-finals, semi-finals and final took place on Saturday 22 August.

- First round and quarter-finals: Best of eleven legs
- Semi-finals: Best of thirteen legs
- Final: Best of fifteen legs

=== Prize money ===
The total prize fund for the event remained at £100,000. The breakdown of prize money is shown below:

| Position (no. of players) | | Prize money (Total: £100,000) |
|---|---|---|
| Winner | (1) | £30,000 |
| Runner-up | (1) | £16,000 |
| Semi-finalists | (2) | £10,000 |
| Quarter-finalists | (4) | £5,000 |
| First round | (8) | £1,750 |

== Participants ==
The PDC announced the eight PDC representatives on 17 June 2026. Reigning champion Luke Littler, who defeated Mike De Decker 8–4 in the 2025 final, did not enter the tournament. Gerwyn Price, the winner of the inaugural edition in 2024, entered the tournament as the top seed.

1. Gerwyn Price (WAL) (semi-finals)
2. Gian van Veen (NED) (quarter-finals)
3. Jonny Clayton (WAL) (semi-finals)
4. James Wade (ENG) (champion)
5. Stephen Bunting (ENG) (quarter-finals)
6. Josh Rock (NIR) (quarter-finals)
7. Damon Heta (AUS) (quarter-finals)
8. Ross Smith (ENG) (first round)

The first two Oceanian representatives were also confirmed on 17 June: 2026 PDC Tour Card holder Adam Leek and reigning ANZ Premier League champion Simon Whitlock. They were joined by five Australian Darts Association (ADA) qualifiers and one Dartplayers New Zealand (DPNZ) qualifier. Darren Penhall withdrew due to a shoulder injury and was replaced by Mal Cuming, the next highest-ranked player on the ADA rankings.

| Qualification | Player |
|---|---|
| PDC Tour Card holders | Adam Leek (AUS) (first round) |
| ANZ Premier League Champion | Simon Whitlock (AUS) (first round) |
| ADA qualifiers | Raymond Smith (AUS) (first round) |
| ADA qualifiers | Brody Klinge (AUS) (runner-up) |
| ADA qualifiers | Tim Pusey (AUS) (first round) |
| ADA qualifiers | Joe Comito (AUS) (first round) |
| ADA qualifiers | Mal Cuming (AUS) (first round) |
| DPNZ qualifier | Ben Robb (NZL) (first round) |

== Summary ==
=== First round ===
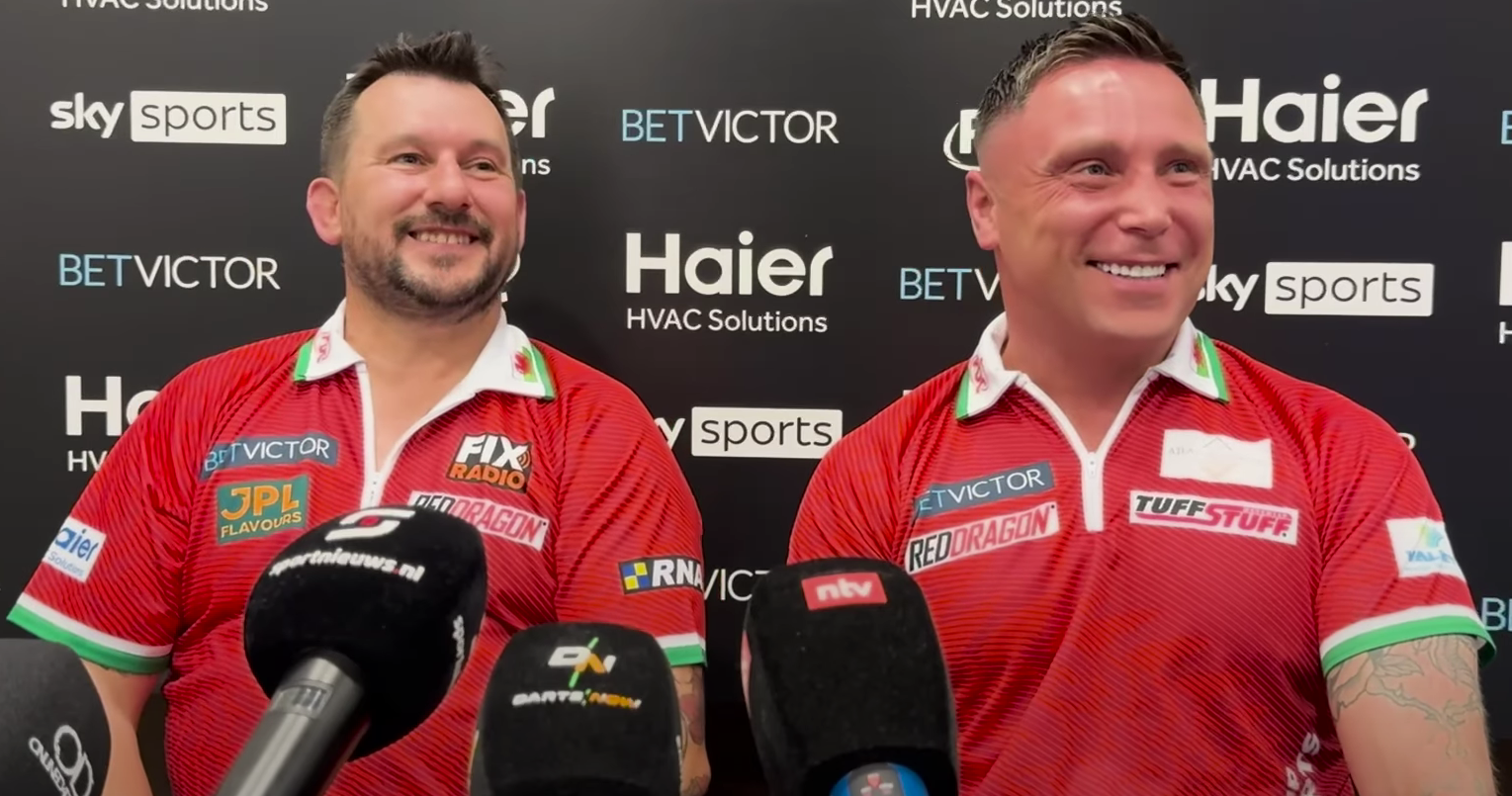
Welsh compatriots Jonny Clayton and Gerwyn Price (Clayton left, Price right, pictured in 2025) both reached the semi-finals.

The first round (best of 11 legs) was played on 21 August. Seven of the eight PDC representatives were victorious in the opening round. Fourth seed James Wade registered a three-dart average of 112.73, the second-highest average achieved at an Australian World Series event, on his way to a whitewash win over Tim Pusey, finishing the match with a 164 checkout. "That felt amazing. Everything just fell into my hands there," said Wade afterwards, who added that "everyone is stuffed" if he could replicate his performance the following day. Oceanian representative Brody Klinge defied a 102.88 average from Ross Smith to defeat the PDC representative in a deciding leg, with the Australian completing the win with an 11-dart break of throw after Smith missed two match darts. Klinge commented that it was "the adrenaline rush of my life" and that he was "on a free rein now" without the pressure of getting past the first round.

Adam Leek took a 3–2 lead against Josh Rock, but Rock won the next four legs to win 6–3. Top seed Gerwyn Price, the 2024 champion, converted back-to-back checkouts of 124 and 108 to beat Simon Whitlock 6–2. Australian number one Damon Heta averaged 102.39 as he beat Joe Comito 6–2. Third seed Jonny Clayton, who won the New Zealand Darts Masters the previous week, defeated Ben Robb 6–3 to begin his pursuit for back-to-back titles. Second seed Gian van Veen and Stephen Bunting were also 6–3 victors, earning respective wins over Raymond Smith and Mal Cuming.

=== Quarter-finals, semi-finals and final ===
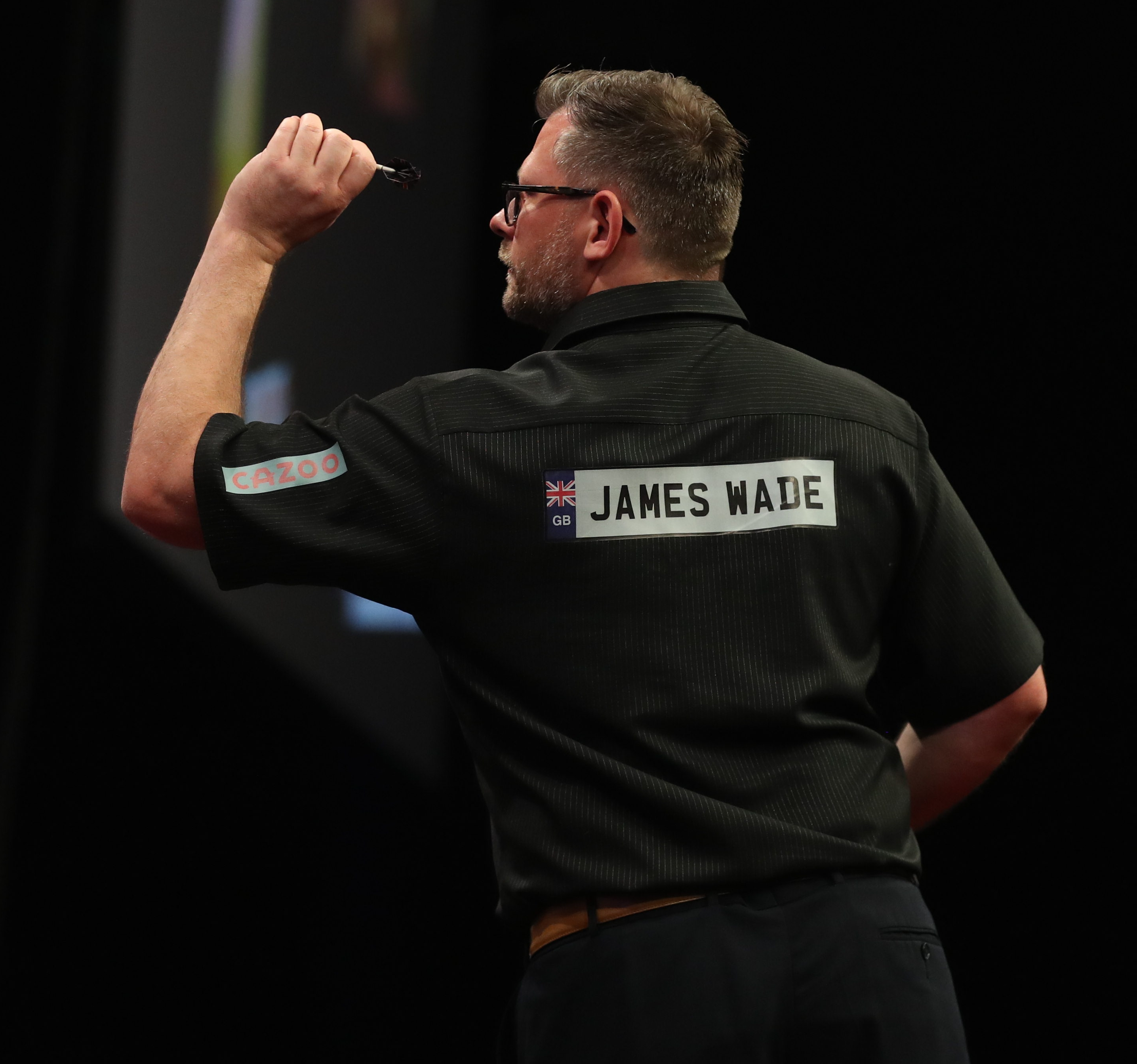
James Wade (pictured in 2022) won his first World Series title by defeating Oceanian representative Brody Klinge 8–5 in the final.

The quarter-finals (best of 11 legs), semi-finals (best of 13 legs) and final (best of 15 legs) were played on 22 August. Gerwyn Price won five consecutive legs to defeat Josh Rock 6–2 with a three-dart average of 101.34 in the opening quarter-final. James Wade hit a 164 checkout as he overturned a 5–2 deficit to beat Stephen Bunting in a deciding leg. Brody Klinge produced another upset win to progress to the semi-finals, eliminating world number two Gian van Veen in a 6–4 victory. In the last quarter-final match, Jonny Clayton defeated Damon Heta 6–3. In the semi-finals, Wade averaged 101.27 to beat top seed Price 7–4, while Klinge converted a 170 checkout to complete a 7–5 win over Clayton, ending the Welshman's hopes of winning back-to-back titles. In just his second World Series appearance, Klinge became the first Oceanian qualifier to reach a World Series final since Heta at the 2019 Brisbane Darts Masters. Wade and Klinge both aimed to win their first World Series title.

Wade found an 11-dart break of throw to establish an early 2–0 lead in the final. The pair, both averaging 107, entered the interval with Wade 4–2 in front. He extended this lead to 6–2 to complete a run of four consecutive legs won. Klinge halted his opponent's momentum and staged a potential comeback, winning the next three legs to reduce the gap to 6–5, including a 140 checkout for 6–4. However, Wade won the next two to secure an 8–5 victory. Wade finished the match with a three-dart average of 101.62, while Klinge averaged 104.56 in defeat.

Wade won his first World Series title and his first televised title since the 2021 UK Open, 13 years after participating in the first World Series event at the 2013 Dubai Darts Masters. He also won the 2018 World Series Finals. In his post-match interview, Wade admitted that he thought he would get a "nice easy win" against the regional qualifier, but Klinge's performance meant he had to work hard for the victory. "I will be really, really disappointed if this man [Klinge] doesn't pursue what he is doing," added Wade, before joking about the reaction he got from the partisan crowd in Wollongong. "The crowd have been behind me the whole time and I've really enjoyed the whole experience. I cannot believe I got here," said Klinge, who vowed to keep playing and "see what happens".

== Draw ==
The draw was announced on 20 August. Numbers to the left of players' names show the seedings for the top four in the tournament. The figures to the right of a player's name state their three-dart average in a match. Players in bold denote match winners.

**First round** (best of 11 legs); 21 August
**1** | **Gerwyn Price 87.58** | **6**
Simon Whitlock 89.78 | 2
**Josh Rock 86.75** | **6**
Adam Leek 77.78 | 3
**4** | **James Wade 112.73** | **6**
Tim Pusey 94.44 | 0
**Stephen Bunting 89.01** | **6**
Mal Cuming 87.35 | 3
**2** | **Gian van Veen 95.98** | **6**
Raymond Smith 92.60 | 3
Ross Smith 102.88 | 5
**Brody Klinge 96.00** | **6**
**3** | **Jonny Clayton 87.79** | **6**
Ben Robb 85.23 | 3
**Damon Heta 102.39** | **6**
Joe Comito 84.80 | 2

**Quarter-finals** (best of 11 legs); 22 August
**1** | **Gerwyn Price 101.34** | **6**
Josh Rock 90.24 | 2
**4** | **James Wade 98.57** | **6**
Stephen Bunting 95.60 | 5
2 | Gian van Veen 93.80 | 4
**Brody Klinge 97.90** | **6**
**3** | **Jonny Clayton 97.96** | **6**
Damon Heta 95.20 | 3

**Semi-finals** (best of 13 legs); 22 August
1 | Gerwyn Price 94.17 | 4
**4** | **James Wade 101.27** | **7**
**Brody Klinge 101.59** | **7**
3 | Jonny Clayton 98.89 | 5

**Final** (best of 15 legs); 22 August
**4** | **James Wade 101.62** | **8**
Brody Klinge 104.56 | 5
