= Japan Open (darts) =

Tournament information
- Venue: Sumida Sangyo Kaikan
- Location: Tokyo
- Country: Japan
- Established: 1977
- Organisation(s): WDF
- Prize fund: YEN 660,000

Current champion(s)
- Paul Lim (men's); Mikuru Suzuki (women's)

The Japan Open is a darts tournament that has been held annually since 2005.

== List of tournaments ==
=== Men's ===
Year	Champion	Av.	Score	Runner-Up	Av.	Prize Money			Venue
Year	Champion	Av.	Score	Runner-Up	Av.	Total	Ch.	R.-Up	Venue
1977	(Japan) Hiroshi Masuda	n/a	beat	(Japan) Masashi Mikasa	n/a	n/a	n/a	n/a	
1988	(Japan) Takao Tanida	n/a	beat	(Japan) Hiroshi Watanobe	n/a	n/a	n/a	n/a	Tokyo
1989	(Japan) Masayusa Satoh	n/a	beat	(Japan) Masaki Kazusa	n/a	n/a	n/a	n/a	Tokyo
1990	(Japan) Hiroshi Watanobe	n/a	beat	(Japan) Ruben Lopez	n/a	n/a	n/a	n/a	Tokyo
1991	(England) Eric Bristow	n/a	beat	(Japan) Hiroshi Watanobe	n/a	n/a	n/a	n/a	Tokyo
1992	(Japan) Yoshifumi Nomura	n/a	beat	(Japan) Hiroshi Watanobe	n/a	n/a	n/a	n/a	Tokyo
1993	(Japan) Hiroshi Watanobe (2)	n/a	beat	(Japan) Hideki Washio	n/a	n/a	n/a	n/a	Tokyo
1995	(Japan) Masayusa Satoh (2)	n/a	beat	(Japan) Masahiro Hiraga	n/a	n/a	n/a	n/a	Tokyo
1996	(Japan) Eiji Komori	n/a	beat	(Japan) Daisuke Ishihara	n/a	n/a	n/a	n/a	Tokyo
1997	(Japan) Hiroshi Watanobe (3)	n/a	beat	(Japan) Yuya Evans	n/a	n/a	n/a	n/a	Tokyo
1999	(Japan) Hiroshi Watanobe (4)	n/a	beat	(Japan) Takeshi Tanaka	n/a	n/a	n/a	n/a	Tokyo
2000	(Thailand) Thanawat Yong	n/a	beat	(Japan) Hiroshi Watanobe	n/a	n/a	n/a	n/a	Tokyo
2001	(England) Andy Jenkins	n/a	beat	(Australia) Tony David	n/a	n/a	n/a	n/a	Tokyo
2002	(Japan) Masaki Kazusa	n/a	beat	(Japan) Masahiro Hiraga	n/a	n/a	n/a	n/a	Tokyo
2003	(Hong Kong) Derek Wu	n/a	beat	(Japan) Hiroshi Watanobe	n/a	n/a	n/a	n/a	Tokyo
2004	(Japan) Daisuke Takeyama	n/a	beat	(Japan) Naoki Shinohara	n/a	n/a	n/a	n/a	Tokyo
2005	(New Zealand) Robert Grant	n/a	beat	(Japan) Masaki Kazusa	n/a	n/a	n/a	n/a	Tokyo
2006	(Australia) Simon Whitlock	n/a	beat	(Japan) Taro Yachi	n/a	n/a	n/a	n/a	Tokyo
2007	(Japan) Masaki Kazusa (2)	n/a	beat	(Japan) Nozomu Kinoshita	n/a	YEN 448,000	YEN 120,000	YEN 60,000	Yokohama Country Club, Yokohama
2008	(Japan) Atsushi Takeuchi	n/a	5 – 2	(Japan) Masaki Kazusa	n/a	YEN 448,000	YEN 120,000	YEN 60,000	Yokohama Country Club, Yokohama
2009	(Japan) Yukihiko Kiyama	n/a	5 – 4	(Japan) Kenichi Ajiki	n/a	YEN 448,000	YEN 120,000	YEN 60,000	Ota Ward Ikegami Hall, Tokyo
2010	(Japan) Katsuya Aiba	n/a	5 – 2	(Japan) Yuichi Okiyama	n/a	YEN 448,000	YEN 120,000	YEN 60,000	Ota City Industrial Plaza, Tokyo
2010	(Australia) Kyle Anderson	n/a	beat	(Hong Kong) Royden Lam	n/a	YEN 180,000	YEN 70,000	YEN 30,000	Ota City Industrial Plaza, Tokyo
2011	(Japan) Hiroaki Shimizu	n/a	beat	(Japan) Katsuya Aiba	n/a	YEN 660,000	YEN 250,000	YEN 150,000	Ota Ward Ikegami Hall, Tokyo
2012	(Japan) Seigo Asada	n/a	beat	(Japan) Osamu Niki	n/a	YEN 210,000	YEN 60,000	YEN 30,000	Ota Ward Ikegami Hall, Tokyo
2013	(Japan) Keita Ono	n/a	beat	(United States) Gordon Dixon	n/a	YEN 680,000	YEN 500,000	YEN 100,000	PIO Hall, Tokyo
2014	(Japan) Seigo Asada (2)	n/a	beat	(Japan) Katsuya Aiba	n/a	YEN 660,000	YEN 250,000	YEN 150,000	PIO Hall, Tokyo
2015	(Japan) Seigo Asada (3)	93.30	6 – 2	(Netherlands) Berry van Peer	89.82	YEN 660,000	YEN 250,000	YEN 150,000	Ota-Ku Sangyo Plaza, Tokyo
2016	(Japan) Seigo Asada (4)	75.78	6 – 0	(Japan) Taro Yachi	64.56	YEN 660,000	YEN 250,000	YEN 150,000	Ota-Ku Sangyo Plaza, Tokyo
2017	(Japan) Seigo Asada (5)	n/a	beat	(Thailand) Thanawat Yong	n/a	YEN 660,000	YEN 250,000	YEN 150,000	Ota-Ku Sangyo Plaza, Tokyo
2018	(Japan) Hiroshi Tanji	n/a	beat	(United States) Chris White	n/a	YEN 620,000	YEN 300,000	YEN 100,000	Ota-Ku Sangyo Plaza, Tokyo
2019	(Japan) Katsuya Aiba (2)	n/a	5 – 4	(Japan) Yuichirou Ogawa	n/a	YEN 870,000	YEN 500,000	YEN 150,000	Ota-Ku Sangyo Plaza, Tokyo
2022	Paul Lim	n/a	5 – 3	Mitsuhiko Tatsunami	n/a	YEN 716,000	YEN 200,000	YEN 100,000	Sumida Sangyo Kaikan, Tokyo
2023	Jun Matsuda	n/a	5 – 4	Kentaro Nishioka	n/a				

=== Women's ===
Year	Champion	Av.	Score	Runner-Up	Av.	Prize Money			Venue
Year	Champion	Av.	Score	Runner-Up	Av.	Total	Ch.	R.-Up	Venue
1991	(Japan) Yoko Koyama	n/a	beat	(Japan) Yukari Nishikawa	n/a	n/a	n/a	n/a	Tokyo
1993	(Japan) Yukari Nishikawa	n/a	beat	(Japan) Mayumi Shimizu	n/a	n/a	n/a	n/a	Tokyo
1995	(Japan) Mayumi Chiba	n/a	beat	(Japan) Yoko Miyaoka	n/a	n/a	n/a	n/a	Tokyo
1999	(Japan) Teruko Kajiwara	n/a	beat	(Japan) Fumie Ono	n/a	n/a	n/a	n/a	Tokyo
2000	(Japan) Teruko Kajiwara (2)	n/a	beat	(Japan) Yoko Higuchi	n/a	n/a	n/a	n/a	Tokyo
2001	(Japan) Yukari Nishikawa (2)	n/a	beat	(Japan) Shinobu Sasaki	n/a	n/a	n/a	n/a	Tokyo
2002	(Japan) Yukari Nishikawa (3)	n/a	beat	(Japan) Naho Ueki	n/a	n/a	n/a	n/a	Tokyo
2003	(Japan) Yukari Nishikawa (4)	n/a	beat	(Japan) Mika Yamakawa	n/a	n/a	n/a	n/a	Tokyo
2004	(Japan) Yukari Nishikawa (5)	n/a	beat	Mayumi Ouchi	n/a	n/a	n/a	n/a	Tokyo
2005	(Japan) Yuka Uto	n/a	beat	(Japan) Kazuko Yamaguchi	n/a	n/a	n/a	n/a	Tokyo
2006	(New Zealand) Jannette Jonathan	n/a	beat	(Japan) Kumiko Nagasawa	n/a	n/a	n/a	n/a	Tokyo
2007	Mayumi Ouchi	n/a	beat	(Japan) Ayumi Takeda	n/a	n/a	n/a	n/a	Yokohama Country Club, Yokohama
2008	Mayumi Ouchi (2)	n/a	4 – 2	(Japan) Yukari Asano	n/a	n/a	n/a	n/a	Yokohama Country Club, Yokohama
2009	Mayumi Ouchi (3)	n/a	4 – 2	(Japan) Ayumi Okubo	n/a	n/a	n/a	n/a	Ota Ward Ikegami Hall, Tokyo
2010	(Japan) Naoki Komine	n/a	4 – 3	(Japan) Atsushi Yamamoto	n/a	n/a	n/a	n/a	Ota City Industrial Plaza, Tokyo
2010	(Australia) Lavinia Hogg	n/a	beat	(Philippines) Analiza Awitan	n/a	n/a	n/a	n/a	Ota City Industrial Plaza, Tokyo
2011	(Japan) Naoki Komine (2)	n/a	beat	Mayumi Ouchi	n/a	n/a	n/a	n/a	Ota Ward Ikegami Hall, Tokyo
2012	(Japan) Aya Nishihara	n/a	beat	(Japan) Yukari Asano	n/a	n/a	n/a	n/a	Ota Ward Ikegami Hall, Tokyo
2013	Kiyo Shimizu	n/a	beat	(Japan) Yukari Asano	n/a	n/a	n/a	n/a	PIO Hall, Tokyo
2014	Mayumi Ouchi (4)	n/a	beat	(Japan) Asako Hiyama	n/a	n/a	n/a	n/a	PIO Hall, Tokyo
2015	(England) Fallon Sherrock	75.72	5 – 2	(Japan) Akari Oshiro	67.14	n/a	n/a	n/a	Ota-Ku Sangyo Plaza, Tokyo
2016	(England) Fallon Sherrock (2)	75.27	5 – 3	Mayumi Ouchi	71.13	n/a	n/a	n/a	Ota-Ku Sangyo Plaza, Tokyo
2017	(Japan) Asako Atarashi	n/a	beat	Sayaka Kameo	n/a	n/a	n/a	n/a	Ota-Ku Sangyo Plaza, Tokyo
2018	(Japan) Mikuru Suzuki	n/a	beat	(South Korea) A-Reum Kim	n/a	n/a	n/a	n/a	Ota-Ku Sangyo Plaza, Tokyo
2019	Mayumi Ouchi (5)	n/a	5 – 1	(South Korea) Hyo-Jin Kim	n/a	n/a	n/a	n/a	Ota-Ku Sangyo Plaza, Tokyo
2022	Mikuru Suzuki (2)	n/a	5 – 0	Yoko Tsukui	n/a	YEN 308,000	YEN 100,000	YEN 50,000	Sumida Sangyo Kaikan, Tokyo

== See also ==
- List of BDO ranked tournaments
- List of WDF tournaments
