= Mayumi Ouchi =

Japanese darts player

Mayumi Ōuchi
Personal information
- Full name: Mayumi Ōuchi
- Nickname: The Wave Rider
- Born: 16 May 1979 (age 47) Yokosuka, Kanagawa Prefecture, Japan
- Home town: Yokosuka, Japan

Sport
- Sport: Darts
- Playing since: 2003
- Darts: 20g Dynasty
- Laterality: Right-handed
- Walk-on music: Uptown Funk by Mark Ronson ft Bruno Mars

Organisation (see split in darts)
- BDO: 2004–2020
- WDF: 2004–
- Current world ranking: (WDF W) 18 (17 August 2026)

WDF major events – best performances
- World Championship: Last 16: 2024
- World Masters: Semi Final: 2022

Other tournament wins
- Years
| Hong Kong Open | 2011, 2014 |
| Japan Open | 2007, 2008, 2009, 2014, 2019, 2023, 2025 |
| Bud Brick Memorial | 2022 |
Medal record
Women's Darts
Representing Japan
WDF World Cup
| Gold medal – first place | 2019 Cluj | Women's pairs |
| Bronze medal – third place | 2005 Perth | Women's singles |
WDF Asia-Pacific Cup
| Gold medal – first place | 2024 Taipei | Women teams |
| Silver medal – second place | 2004 Singapore | Women's pairs |
| Silver medal – second place | 2008 Palmerston | Women's pairs |
| Silver medal – second place | 2014 Hong Kong | Women's pairs |
| Bronze medal – third place | 2004 Singapore | Women's singles |
| Bronze medal – third place | 2006 Kuala Lumpur | Women's pairs |
| Bronze medal – third place | 2010 Tokyo | Women's singles |
| Bronze medal – third place | 2010 Tokyo | Women's pairs |
| Bronze medal – third place | 2012 Darwin | Women's singles |
| Bronze medal – third place | 2012 Darwin | Women's pairs |
| Bronze medal – third place | 2014 Hong Kong | Women's singles |
| Bronze medal – third place | 2024 Taipei | Women's singles |

Mayumi Ōuchi (大内麻由美, Ōuchi Mayumi; born 16 May 1979) is a Japanese professional darts player who plays in World Darts Federation (WDF) and other national events. She is a six-time Japan Open champion and she represented her country ten times at the World Masters, where she advanced to the semi-finals in 2022. One of the most successful darts players from Japan and the first WDF World Cup women medalist from this country.

== Career ==
Her first international success was winning a silver medal at the 2004 WDF Asia-Pacific Cup in women's pairs competition, with the best Japanese women darts player at this time Yukari Nishikawa. In the final match they lost 0–4 in legs to Megan Smith and Jannette Jonathan from New Zealand and take the silver medal. Her first single achievement came a year later during the 2005 WDF World Cup, where she advanced to semi-finals and lost 0–4 in legs to Clare Bywaters, ending the game with a bronze medal.

In 2012, Ōuchi was invited to participate in the Professional Darts Corporation (PDC) tournament 2012 DPA Tournament of Champions held in Australia. In the first round match, she was defeated by Graham Filby from South Africa.

== Personal life ==
Her father, Masatami Ōuchi was also a darts player, with some success at the national level in 2003–2007. Besides darts, Mayumi is also a surfing amateur.

== World Championship results ==
=== WDF ===
- 2023: First round (lost to Kirsty Hutchinson 0–2)
- 2024: Second round (lost to Aileen de Graaf 0–2)
- 2025: Preliminary round (lost to Nina Lech-Musialska 0–2)

== Performance timeline ==
| Tournament | 2008 | 2009 | 2010 | 2011 | 2012 | 2013 | 2014 | 2015 | 2016 | 2017 | 2018 | 2019 | 2020 | 2021 | 2022 | 2023 | 2024 |
|---|---|---|---|---|---|---|---|---|---|---|---|---|---|---|---|---|---|
WDF Ranked televised events
| World Championship | DNQ | | | | | | | | | | | | | | | 1R | 2R |
| World Masters | 1R | 1R | 2R | 4R | QF | DNP | QF | QF | DNP | | | QF | NH | | SF | NH | 1R |
