= Jonny Tata =

New Zealand darts player (born 1992)

Personal information
- Nickname: "JT"
- Born: 28 August 1992 (age 34) Wainuiomata, Lower Hutt, New Zealand

Sport
- Sport: Darts
- Darts: 25g Zen Satori
- Laterality: Right-handed
- Walk-on music: "Bangarang" by Skrillex

WDF major events – best performances
- World Championship: Quarter-final: 2023
- World Masters: Last 128: 2022

PDC premier events – best performances
- World Championship: Last 64: 2026
- World Series Finals: Last 32: 2025

Jonny Tata (born 28 August 1992) is a New Zealand darts player who competes in Professional Darts Corporation (PDC) and World Darts Federation (WDF) events. He hit the first nine-dart finish in Darts Players New Zealand (DPNZ) Pro Tour history. Tata qualified for the 2023 WDF World Darts Championship and the 2026 PDC World Darts Championship.

== Darts career ==
The son of former national champion Ra Tata, Jonny Tata began playing darts aged nine. He won a number of youth titles but gave up playing at the age of 17. During the COVID-19 pandemic, he began to play again.

Tata made his World Series of Darts debut at the 2023 New Zealand Darts Masters. He defeated world number two Peter Wright 6–3 in the first round.

In September 2025, Tata topped the end of season 2025 DPNZ Pro Tour ranking, hitting the first ever nine-dart finish in DPNZ Pro Tour history during his victory in the final of the last event. This qualified him for the 2026 PDC World Darts Championship, his first ever PDC World Championship. His victory on the Pro Tour also saw him qualify for the 2025 ANZ Premier League, a competition featuring eight of the best darts players from Australia and New Zealand. Tata won the opening night of the tournament in Melbourne, defeating Raymond Smith 5–3 in the final.

During the 2026 WDF season, Tata defended the Canterbury Classic title he had won in 2025.

== Personal life ==
Tata is Māori, of Ngāti Maniapoto and Te Āti Awa. Outside of darts, Tata works as a truck driver. He has two sons.

== World Championship results ==
=== WDF World Championship ===
- 2023: Quarter-finals (lost to Andy Baetens 2–4)

=== PDC World Championship ===
- 2026: Second round (lost to Ryan Meikle 2–3)

== Performance timeline ==
Tata's performance timeline is as follows:

=== WDF ===
Tournament	2022	2023
WDF major/platinum events
World Championship	DNQ	QF
World Masters	2R	NH
Australian Open	DNQ	SF

=== PDC ===
Tournament	2025	2026
PDC Ranked televised events
World Championship	DNQ	2R
PDC Non-ranked televised events
World Cup	DNQ	RR
World Series Finals	1R	

==== Dart Players New Zealand Pro Tour ====
Season	1	2	3	4	5	6	7	8	9	10	11	12
2025	SF	L16	SF	SF	L16	W	SF	W	QF	W	W	W
2026	SF	F	QF	L32	L16	W	F	SF	F	QF	F	F

Performance Table Legend
W	Won the tournament	F	Finalist	SF	Semifinalist	QF	Quarterfinalist	#R; RR; L#	Lost in # round Round-robin; Last # stage	DQ	Disqualified
DNQ	Did not qualify	DNP	Did not participate	WD	Withdrew	NH	Tournament not held	#R; RR; L#	Lost in # round Round-robin; Last # stage	NYF	Not yet founded
