= 2026 in PDC =

Darts tournament series

2026 Professional Darts Corporation season

Tournament information
- Dates: 3 January 2026 – 29 November 2026
- Organisation(s): Professional Darts Corporation
- World Championship: Luke Littler
- World Matchplay: Luke Littler
- Premier League: Luke Littler
- World Cup: England (Luke Humphries and Luke Littler)
- Current number one: Luke Littler

The year 2026 is the 35th year in the history of the Professional Darts Corporation (PDC), a darts organisation based in the United Kingdom.

== PDC in 2026 ==
=== Increases to prize money and tournament sizes ===
On 31 March 2025, the PDC announced a mass increase in prize money for tournaments, starting from the 2026 PDC World Darts Championship, where the champion receives a doubled top prize of £1,000,000 from a total prize fund of £5,000,000. The total amount of prize money on offer in PDC events in 2026 went up £7,000,000 from the 2025 season, along with increases for the PDC's secondary tours and Global Affiliate Tours, with only the World Series events and the World Masters not receiving increases in prize money. The field for the World Championship also expanded from 96 to 128 players, while the Grand Slam of Darts will expand from 32 to 48 players.

Prize money changes between the 2026 and 2025 PDC seasons (£1000s)
Tournament	Year	Total	Winner	Finalist	Top 4	Top 8	Top 16	Top 32	Top 48	Top 64	Top 96	Top 128
Televised tournaments
UK Open	2026	750	120	60	35	20	12.5	7.5	—N/a	3	2	1.25
UK Open	2025	600	110	50	30	15	10	5	—N/a	2.5	1.5	1
Premier League Darts (Note: Nightly winners receive a £10,000 bonus)	2026	1,250	350	170	110	95–80 (Note: The fifth-placed player will receive £95,000, the sixth-placed £90,000, the seventh-placed £85,000 and the eighth-placed £80,000.)	—N/a					
Premier League Darts	2025	1,000	275	125	85	75–60 (Note: The fifth-placed player received £75,000, the sixth-placed £70,000, the seventh-placed £65,000 and the eighth-placed £60,000.)	—N/a					
World Cup of Darts per pair	2026	500	100	48	30	20	10	6 (Note: Awarded to the 16 teams that finish second in their three-team group, equivalent to the Top 32 the Grand Slam of Darts since four seeded nations receive byes to the round of 16.)	5 (Note: Awarded to the 16 teams that finish third in their three-team group, equivalent to the Top 32 the Grand Slam of Darts since four seeded nations receive byes to the round of 16.)	—N/a		
World Cup of Darts per pair	2025	450	80	50	30	20	9	5	4			
World Matchplay	2026	1,000	225	125	65	35	22.5	12.5	—N/a	—N/a		
World Matchplay	2025	800	200	100	50	30	15	10	—N/a			
Women's World Matchplay	2026	40	15	8	4.5	2	—N/a					
Women's World Matchplay	2025	25	10	5	2.5	1.25	—N/a					
World Series Finals	2026	450	100	60	30	17.5	10	5	—N/a			
World Series Finals	2025	400	80	40	25	17.5	10	5	—N/a			
World Grand Prix	2026	750	150	80	50	35	20	7.5	—N/a			
World Grand Prix	2025	600	120	60	40	25	15	7.5	—N/a			
European Championship	2026	750	150	80	50	35	20	7.5	—N/a			
European Championship	2025	600	120	60	40	25	15	7.5	—N/a			
Grand Slam of Darts (Note: In 2026, the Grand Slam of Darts will expand from 8 groups of 4 players to 16 groups of 3 players.)	2026	1,000	200	100	60	35	20	12.5 (Note: Second-placed players in the group stage.)	5	—N/a		
Grand Slam of Darts	2025	650	150	70	50	25	12	5 (Note: £8,000 and £5,000 were awarded to the third and fourth place finishers respectively in the group stage, which comprised the top 32.)	—N/a			
Players Championship Finals	2026	750	130	70	40	27.5	15	7	—N/a	4	—N/a	
Players Championship Finals	2025	600	120	60	30	20	10	6.5	—N/a	3	—N/a	
European Tour events (15 in 2026, 14 in 2025)	2026	230	35	15	10	8	5	3.5	2	—N/a	—N/a	
European Tour events (15 in 2026, 14 in 2025)	2025	175	30	12	8.5	6	4	2.5	1.25	—N/a		
Floor tournaments (Note: The final of the World Youth Championship is televised during the Players Championship Finals)
Players Championship events	2026	150	15	10	6.5	4	3	2	—N/a	1.25	—N/a	
Players Championship events	2025	125	15	10	5	3.5	2.5	1.5	—N/a	1.0	—N/a	
World Youth Championship	2026	100	15	7	3.4	2	1.5	0.8	—N/a	0.6	0.4	0.2
World Youth Championship	2025	100	12	6	3	2	1.5	1	—N/a	0.6	0.4	0.2
Challenge Tour and Development Tour events	2026	20	3	2	1	0.75	0.35	0.25	—N/a	0.1	—N/a	
Challenge Tour and Development Tour events	2025	15	2.5	1	0.75	0.5	0.3	0.2	—N/a	0.075	—N/a	
Women's Series events	2026	15	2.5	1	0.75	0.5	0.3	0.2	—N/a	0.075	—N/a	
Women's Series events	2025	10	2	1	0.5	0.3	0.2	0.1	—N/a	0.05	—N/a	

=== Changes to Q-School ===
On each day of the Final Stage of Q-School, a Tour Card is awarded to both finalists, rather than just to the day's tournament winner as in previous years. As before, remaining Tour Card places are awarded through the Q-School Order of Merit. As before, players who qualify on the first three days of the Final Stage do not need to play the remaining days. However, each day of the Final Stage will be topped up to 128 players with the best available players who failed to qualify from the First Stage, rather than byes being awarded.

=== Changes to qualification criteria for events ===
Several events had tweaks to their qualification criteria. European Tour seeding changed so that reserve players no longer take a seeded player's position in the draw. It was originally announced that seeding in first round matches would be based on the full Order of Merit rather than the Pro Tour Order of Merit, but this rule change was reverted before the first event. Additionally, it was announced that players would be chosen for World Cup teams based on their Challenge Tour Ranking if a nation has no players ranked on the Order of Merit and no local Affiliate Tour. Tour Card holders ranked inside the top 64 who failed to qualify for the World Championship by the main or Pro Tour Orders of Merit have been re-permitted to enter regional qualifying tournaments, while World Youth Championship finalists will qualify for the newly-expanded Grand Slam of Darts in the same year, rather than in the next.

=== New event locations ===
The 2026 Premier League Darts schedule was announced in September 2025 and included a night in Belgium for the first time, as Antwerp replaced Exeter in the lineup. The 2026 European Tour saw the introduction of two new events: the Poland Darts Open in Kraków and the Slovak Darts Open in Bratislava. The Poland Darts Open replaced the Poland Darts Masters, a World Series event that was on the PDC calendar since 2023, while the Slovak Darts Open marked the PDC's first visit to Slovakia.

As part of the 2026 World Series of Darts, it was announced that the PDC would hold its first event in Saudi Arabia, the Saudi Arabia Darts Masters, in January. The announcement followed interest shown by PDC president Barry Hearn and General Entertainment Authority chairman Turki Al-Sheikh to take darts to the country.

In December 2025, it was confirmed that the 2026 PDC World Championship would be the last edition of the tournament to be held in the West Hall of Alexandra Palace. The event will be held in the venue's Great Hall for the first time at the 2027 PDC World Championship.

=== Television deals ===
In February 2025, Sky Sports announced a five-year extension of its partnership with the PDC, continuing coverage of the PDC World Darts Championship, Premier League Darts, World Matchplay, Grand Slam of Darts, World Grand Prix, and the World Cup of Darts on the broadcaster until 2030.

In October 2025, the PDC agreed to a new three-year deal with ITV Sport to broadcast events on ITV4 and ITVX until 2028; these events included the World Masters, UK Open, European Championship, Players Championship Finals, World Series Finals, and all global World Series events. The announcement also stated that the PDC would take control of its own event production, which was previously managed by ITV.

In June 2026, the PDC announced a deal with ESPN to broadcast five events on ESPN2 and ESPN+ in the United States. These events were the US Darts Masters, World Matchplay, World Grand Prix, Grand Slam of Darts, and the 2027 World Championship.

=== Affiliate Tour expansion ===
In December 2025, the PDC announced a three-year funding cycle for PDC Global Affiliate Tours that involved an investment of over £3,000,000. There will be increased prize money for events on the Nordic and Baltic Pro Tour and the DartPlayers New Zealand Tour, while the China Pro Tour and Australian Darts Association Tour will have more events. Additionally, the African Continental Tour will expand to six events in each of the North and South regions, with an increase in the number of African qualifiers for the World Championship from one to two in 2027.

== Televised events ==
The following televised events are scheduled to take place in 2026.

=== Ranked ===
The events listed in the table are ranked tournaments that contribute to a player's ranking on the PDC Order of Merit.

Date	Event	Venue	Champion	Score	Runner-up	Ref.
11 December 2025 – 3 January 2026	World Championship	Alexandra Palace, London, England	Luke Littler (106.02)	7–1 (s)	Gian van Veen (99.94)	
28 January – 1 February 2026	World Masters	Arena MK, Milton Keynes, England	Luke Littler (104.72)	6–5 (s)	Luke Humphries (105.51)	
6–8 March 2026	UK Open	Butlin's Resort, Minehead, England	Luke Littler (99.58)	11–7 (l)	James Wade (89.49)	
18–26 July 2026	World Matchplay	Winter Gardens, Blackpool, England	Luke Littler (111.53)	18–9 (l)	Gerwyn Price (104.97)	
28 September – 4 October 2026	World Grand Prix	Mattioli Arena, Leicester, England	Luke Humphries (93.16)	6–4 (s)	Gerwyn Price (95.37)	
22–25 October 2026	European Championship	Westfalenhallen, Dortmund, Germany	Ross Smith (92.92)	11–8 (l)	Martin Schindler (91.49)	
14–22 November 2026	Grand Slam	WV Active Aldersley, Wolverhampton, England	Gerwyn Price (97.34)	16–11 (l)	Gian van Veen (94.76)	
27–29 November 2026	Players Championship Finals	Butlin's Resort, Minehead, England				

=== Non-ranked ===
The events listed in these tables are non-ranked invitational tournaments.

Date	Event	Venue	Champion	Score	Runner-up	Ref.
5 February – 28 May	Premier League	The O2 Arena, London, England (Note: The tournament is held across 17 different venues, with the finals being played in The O2 Arena.)	Luke Littler (111.67)	11–10 (l)	Luke Humphries (105.60)	
11– 14 June	World Cup	Eissporthalle, Frankfurt, Germany	England (104.77) (Luke Littler and Luke Humphries)	10–5 (l)	Netherlands (98.30) (Gian van Veen and Michael van Gerwen)	
17–20 September	World Series Finals	AFAS Live, Amsterdam, Netherlands	Ross Smith (103.89)	11–5 (l)	Gerwyn Price (97.28)	

==== World Series of Darts ====
The 2026 World Series of Darts is a series of invitational darts tournaments organised by the PDC, consisting of six events that will be held across four continents.

No.	Date	Event	Venue	Champion	Score	Runner-up	Ref.
1	15–16 January	Bahrain Masters	Exhibition World Bahrain, Sakhir, Bahrain	Michael van Gerwen (100.91)	8–6	Gian van Veen (100.79)	
2	19–20 January	Saudi Arabia Masters	Global Theatre, Riyadh, Saudi Arabia	Luke Littler (104.84)	8–5	Michael van Gerwen (101.79)	
3	5–6 June	Nordic Masters	Forum Copenhagen, Copenhagen, Denmark	Michael van Gerwen (98.90)	8–7	Luke Humphries (98.93)	
4	25–26 June	US Masters	Madison Square Garden, New York City, United States	Luke Humphries (104.05)	8–7	Luke Littler (99.50)	
5	14–15 August	New Zealand Masters	Spark Arena, Auckland, New Zealand	Jonny Clayton (94.96)	8–4	Gerwyn Price (95.49)	
6	21–22 August	Australian Masters	WIN Entertainment Centre, Wollongong, Australia	James Wade (101.62)	8–5	Brody Klinge (104.56)	

== Pro Tour ==
The 2026 PDC Pro Tour is a series of darts tournaments organised by the PDC, consisting of 34 Players Championship events and 15 European Tour events.

=== Tour cards ===
The 2026 PDC Tour Cards were awarded to:

- (64) The top 64 players from the PDC Order of Merit after the 2025 World Championship.
- (28) 28 qualifiers from 2024 Q-School not ranked in the top 64 of the PDC Order of Merit following the World Championship.
- (1) The highest qualifier from the 2024 Development Tour (Sebastian Białecki)
  - Niko Springer, who also earned a Tour Card through the 2024 Development Tour, entered the top 64 in his first year on tour. Therefore, one extra Tour Card was awarded to a 2026 Q-School qualifier.
- (2) Two highest qualifiers from the 2024 Challenge Tour (Wesley Plaisier and Christian Kist)
- (2) Highest qualifiers from the 2025 Development Tour (Beau Greaves and Owen Bates).
- (2) Highest qualifiers from the 2025 Challenge Tour (Stefan Bellmont and Darius Labanauskas).
- (16) The daily top two players from the 2026 Q-Schools.

Afterwards, the playing field was complemented by the highest qualified players from the Q-School Order of Merit until the maximum number of 128 Pro Tour Card players was reached.

==== Q-School ====
The players below earned PDC Tour Cards at UK Q-School in Milton Keynes and European Q-School in Kalkar.

8 January	9 January	10 January	11 January
UK Q-School
Rhys Griffin (WAL); Adam Leek (AUS)	Carl Sneyd (ENG); Niall Culleton (IRL)	Shane McGuirk (IRL); Tom Sykes (ENG)	Charlie Manby (ENG); Samuel Price (ENG)
European Q-School
Arno Merk (GER); Filip Bereza (POL)	Jeffrey Sparidaans (NED); Cristo Reyes (ESP)	Matthias Ehlers (GER); Yorick Hofkens (GER)	Sietse Lap (NED); Jeffrey de Zwaan (NED)

At the end of the fourth day in the Final Stage, the following players picked up Tour Cards through the Orders of Merit:

UK Q-School Order of Merit

1. Stephen Burton (ENG)
2. Mervyn King (ENG)
3. Tyler Thorpe (ENG)
4. Stephen Rosney (IRL)
5. David Sharp (SCO)

European Q-School Order of Merit

1. Jimmy van Schie (NED)
2. Chris Landman (NED)
3. Marvin Kraft (GER)
4. Benjamin Pratnemer (SVN)
5. Adam Gawlas (CZE)
6. Jurjen van der Velde (NED)
7. Alexander Merkx (NED)
8. Pascal Rupprecht (GER)

== Secondary tours ==
The 2026 PDC secondary tours are series of darts tournaments organised by the PDC that operate outside of the main PDC Pro Tour and predominantly feature players without a Tour Card. There are three secondary tours: the Challenge Tour (for players who unsuccessfully participated in the 2026 Q-School), Development Tour (for players aged 16 to 24) and Women's Series (for female players).

== Global Affiliate Tours ==
The PDC Global Affiliate Tours are a series of regional darts competitions organised by the PDC in collaboration with various local darts organisations around the world.

=== Asian Tour ===
The PDC Asian Tour is the PDC Global Affiliate Tour for players from Asia. The 2026 calendar consists of 28 tournaments held over seven weekends.

No.	Date	Venue	Winner	Legs	Runner-up	Ref.
1	24 January	Le Méridien Hotel and Conference Centre, Dubai, United Arab Emirates	Haruki Muramatsu (94.66)	5 – 4	Motomu Sakai (88.50)	
2	24 January	Le Méridien Hotel and Conference Centre, Dubai, United Arab Emirates	Haruki Muramatsu (99.62)	5 – 1	Altantülkhüür Myagmarsüren (80.62)	
3	25 January	Le Méridien Hotel and Conference Centre, Dubai, United Arab Emirates	Man Lok Leung (94.96)	5 – 3	Alain Abiabi (91.61)	
4	25 January	Le Méridien Hotel and Conference Centre, Dubai, United Arab Emirates	Ryuta Arihara (94.44)	5 – 4	Christian Perez (88.99)	
5	4 April	Twin Messe, Shizuoka, Japan	Lok Yin Lee (87.57)	5 – 3	Paolo Nebrida (86.66)	
6	4 April	Twin Messe, Shizuoka, Japan	Tomoya Goto (84.90)	5 – 4	Lok Yin Lee (84.55)	
7	5 April	Twin Messe, Shizuoka, Japan	Man Lok Leung (90.30)	5 – 4	Lok Yin Lee (91.46)	
8	5 April	Twin Messe, Shizuoka, Japan	Ganzorig Lkhagvasüren (85.40)	5 – 0	Ryuta Arihara (82.93)	
9	2 May	Raintree Club; Kuala Lumpur, Malaysia	Aris Quijano (94.19)	5 – 3	Ryusei Azemoto (90.91)	
10	2 May	Raintree Club; Kuala Lumpur, Malaysia	Paolo Nebrida (97.32)	5 – 3	Aris Quijano (87.50)	
11	3 May	Raintree Club; Kuala Lumpur, Malaysia	Haruki Muramatsu (85.77)	5 – 1	Lihao Wen (74.37)	
12	3 May	Raintree Club; Kuala Lumpur, Malaysia	Paolo Nebrida (85.98)	5 – 3	Yuta Hayashi (83.35)	
13	16 May	Triple Event Hall, Ulaanbaatar, Mongolia	Haruki Muramatsu (86.12)	5 – 4	Christian Perez (86.66)	
14	16 May	Triple Event Hall, Ulaanbaatar, Mongolia	Alain Abiabi (86.65)	5 – 1	Paolo Nebrida (73.23)	
15	17 May	Triple Event Hall, Ulaanbaatar, Mongolia	Yuya Fukuchi (80.36)	5 – 4	Motomu Sakai (88.95)	
16	17 May	Triple Event Hall, Ulaanbaatar, Mongolia	Motomu Sakai (108.91)	5 – 0	Christian Perez (88.27)	
17	11 July	Forest5 Darts Cafe, Singapore	Motomu Sakai (91.00)	5 – 2	Lok Yin Lee (89.28)	
18	11 July	Forest5 Darts Cafe, Singapore	Christian Perez (90.48)	5 – 1	Alexis Toylo (76.15)	
19	12 July	Forest5 Darts Cafe, Singapore	Christian Perez (94.42)	5 – 1	Alexis Toylo (97.06)	
20	12 July	Forest5 Darts Cafe, Singapore	Lourence Ilagan (88.39)	5 – 4	Paolo Nebrida (85.35)	
21	1 August	Winford Resort and Casino, Manila, Philippines	Lok Yin Lee (92.35)	5 – 3	Takayuki Masatsu (93.18)	
22	1 August	Winford Resort and Casino, Manila, Philippines	Ryuta Arihara (90.54)	5 – 0	(Philippines) Jeffrey Pinas (86.52)	
23	2 August	Winford Resort and Casino, Manila, Philippines	Ryuta Arihara (88.69)	5 – 4	Paolo Nebrida (84.24)	
24	2 August	Winford Resort and Casino, Manila, Philippines	Ryuta Arihara (95.29)	5 – 1	Christian Perez (75.87)	
25	12 September	New Century Resort; Changjiang, China	Rolly Gabiana (82.61)	5 – 1	Xiaochen Zong (76.83)	
26	12 September	New Century Resort; Changjiang, China	Ryuta Arihara (88.22)	5 – 3	(Philippines) Rolly Gabiana (85.73)	
27	13 September	New Century Resort; Changjiang, China	Lok Yin Lee (91.95)	5 – 2	(Philippines) Christian De Los Reyes (93.97)	
28	13 September	New Century Resort; Changjiang, China	Alexis Toylo (75.24)	5 – 3	Lourence Ilagan (74.76)	

==== Asian Championship ====
Following the final four Asian Tour events, the PDC Asian Championship was contested on 14 September in Changjiang, Hainan, China. The tournament featured 64 players, and the top 16 players in the 2026 Asian Tour rankings were seeded. The winner Paolo Nebrida qualified for the 2026 Grand Slam of Darts and together with Finalist Kam Weng Cheng for the 2027 PDC World Darts Championship.

Second round (best of 3 sets); 14 Sep
Ryuta Arihara 81.27	1
Noel Malicdem 83.97	2
Jenn Ming Tan 87.55	2
Jizhou Li 66.76	0
Haruki Muramatsu 91.08	1
Christian Perez 94.29	2
Joel Hizon 74.58	1
Paolo Nebrida 81.12	2
(Macau) Kam Weng Chen 77.91	2
(Chinese Taipei) Pin Feng Yeh 77.65	0
(Philippines) Sonny Milo Balagat 88.65	2
Lourence Ilagan 85.84	1
Royden Lam 76.05	0
(Philippines) Rolly Gabiana 84.41	2
Eduardo Largo 71.00	0
Ryusei Azemoto 96.97	2

Quarter-finals (best of 3 sets); 14 Sep
Noel Malicdem 84.58	2
Jenn Ming Tan 78.44	0
Christian Perez 84.76	0
Paolo Nebrida 89.40	2
(Macau) Kam Weng Chen 74.66	2
(Philippines) Sonny Milo Balagat 74.20	0
(Philippines) Rolly Gabiana 89.20	1
Ryusei Azemoto 89.95	2

Semi-finals (best of 3 sets); 14 Sep
Noel Malicdem 86.39	0
Paolo Nebrida 86.32	2
(Macau) Kam Weng Chen 83.74	2
Ryusei Azemoto 80.33	1

Final (best of 5 sets); 14 Sep
Paolo Nebrida 85.93	3
(Macau) Kam Weng Chen 83.54	0

=== Championship Darts Circuit (CDC) ===
The Championship Darts Circuit (CDC) is the PDC Global Affiliate Tour for players from North America. The 2026 calendar consists of 16 tournaments.

No.	Date	Location	Winner	Score	Runner-up	Ref.
1	8–9 May	Niagara Falls, New York, United States	Adam Sevada (92.56)	7 – 6	Stowe Buntz (90.69)	
2	8–9 May	Niagara Falls, New York, United States	Adam Sevada (97.05)	7 – 2	Brayden Hall (91.14)	
3	5–7 June	Philadelphia, Pennsylvania, United States	Leonard Gates (83.98)	7 – 3	John Part (81.15)	
4	5–7 June	Philadelphia, Pennsylvania, United States	Danny Young (85.76)	7 – 6	(United States) Ronald Sargent (89.92)	
5	17–19 July	Brownsburg, Indiana, United States	Adam Sevada (95.88)	7 – 3	Leonard Gates (91.76)	
6	17–19 July	Brownsburg, Indiana, United States	Brayden Hall (80.89)	7 – 4	(United States) Jason Watt (81.51)	
7	17–19 July	Brownsburg, Indiana, United States	Fred Krueger (82.20)	7 – 2	Leonard Gates (70.58)	
8	29–30 August	Oakbrook Terrace, Illinois, United States	Gary Mawson (88.11)	7 – 3	Adam Sevada (88.39)	
9	29–30 August	Oakbrook Terrace, Illinois, United States	Fred Krueger (86.98)	7 – 4	Alex Spellman (79.62)	
10	29–30 August	Oakbrook Terrace, Illinois, United States	Adam Sevada (91.64)	5 – 3	Leonard Gates (87.20)	
11	19–20 September	Oakbrook Terrace, Illinois, United States	Fred Krueger (98.09)	7 – 4	Alex Spellman (89.72)	
12	19–20 September	Oakbrook Terrace, Illinois, United States	David Cameron (85.58)	7 – 5	Adam Sevada (87.57)	
13	19–20 September	Oakbrook Terrace, Illinois, United States	Alex Spellman (90.14)	7 – 1	Doug Boehm (81.79)	
14	17–18 October	St. Catherines, Ontario, Canada	Leonard Gates (86.88)	7 – 6	Fred Krueger (91.22)	
15	17–18 October	St. Catherines, Ontario, Canada	Jeff Smith (76.21)	7 – 1	(United States) Ram Guevara Jr. (73.05)	
16	17–18 October	St. Catherines, Ontario, Canada	Joey Lynaugh (83.98)	7 – 4	Leonard Gates (78.52)	

==== Cross-Border Darts Challenge ====
The Cross-Border Darts Challenge featured eight players from both Canada and the United States. The event took place in Deer Lake, Newfoundland on 17–18 April.

First round (best of 9 legs); 17 April
USA1	Adam Sevada 82.82	5
John Part 76.44	2
CAN4	Jim Long 89.79	5
Doug Boehm 80.60	2
CAN2	Darryl Christie 75.08	5
Jason Brandon 76.16	3
USA3	Leonard Gates 87.32	4
Jacob Taylor 90.21	5
CAN1	David Cameron 92.78	5
Larry Butler 65.04	0
USA4	Gary Mawson 80.63	2
Jeff Smith 84.28	5
USA2	Stowe Buntz 83.34	4
Albert Anstey 84.14	5
CAN3	Kiley Edmunds 84.06	5
Nick Linberg 77.01	3

Quarter-finals (best of 9 legs); 18 April
USA1	Adam Sevada 93.02	5
CAN4	Jim Long 84.14	3
CAN2	Darryl Christie 77.15	5
Jacob Taylor 79.84	2
CAN1	David Cameron 88.42	5
Jeff Smith 86.37	3
Albert Anstey 80.19	1
CAN3	Kiley Edmunds 84.03	5

Semi-finals (best of 11 legs); 18 April
USA1	Adam Sevada 91.27	6
CAN2	Darryl Christie 83.54	4
CAN1	David Cameron 83.59	6
CAN3	Kiley Edmunds 84.42	2

Final (best of 13 legs); 18 April
USA1	Adam Sevada 88.67	3
CAN1	David Cameron 94.80	7

==== North American Championship ====
The North American Championship featured eight players from Canada and the United States. The event took place at the Infosys Theater at Madison Square Garden in New York City on the afternoon of 26 June, in conjunction with the US Darts Masters.

Quarter-finals (best of 11 legs)
1	Jim Long 74.04	6
Brayden Hall 75.18	1
4	Leonard Gates 79.92	4
Fred Krueger 79.27	6
2	Adam Sevada 102.48	6
Alex Spellman 71.00	0
3	David Cameron 81.06	5
Gary Mawson 80.90	6

Semi-finals (best of 11 legs)
1	Jim Long 87.08	6
Fred Krueger 83.70	5
2	Adam Sevada 89.59	6
Gary Mawson 74.37	3

Final (best of 11 legs)
1	Jim Long 85.22	1
2	Adam Sevada 89.87	6

=== Nordic & Baltic Tour ===
The PDC Nordic & Baltic (PDCNB) Tour is the PDC Global Affiliate Tour for players from the Nordic countries and the Baltic states. The 2026 calendar was announced on 27 November 2025, consisting of 12 tour events held across six weekends, as well as qualifiers for European Tour events.

No.	Date	Venue	Winner	Legs	Runner-up	Ref.
1	7 February	Radisson Riga Valdemara, Riga, Latvia	Cor Dekker (90.68)	6 – 5	Andreas Harrysson (92.83)	
2	8 February	Radisson Riga Valdemara, Riga, Latvia	Jani Haavisto (95.47)	6 – 4	Oskar Lukasiak (87.14)	
3	28 March	Radisson Riga Valdemara, Riga, Latvia	Jonas Sørensen (80.10)	6 – 1	Cor Dekker (87.18)	
4	29 March	Radisson Riga Valdemara, Riga, Latvia	Cor Dekker (82.64)	6 – 1	Jani Haavisto (77.70)	
5	25 April	Hotel Tallukka, Vääksy, Finland	Darius Labanauskas (88.40)	6 – 5	Andreas Toft Jørgensen (85.66)	
6	26 April	Hotel Tallukka, Vääksy, Finland	Mio Varila (83.60)	6 – 3	Cor Dekker (88.14)	
7	16 May	Apple Hotel, Gothenburg, Sweden	Darius Labanauskas (84.23)	6 – 1	Daniel Larsson (82.75)	
8	17 May	Apple Hotel, Gothenburg, Sweden	Daniel Larsson (89.96)	6 – 4	Jani Haavisto (87.17)	
9	8 August	Best Western Plus, Oslo, Norway	Benjamin Drue Reus (82.60)	6 – 4	Teemu Harju (79.20)	
10	9 August	Best Western Plus, Oslo, Norway	Oskar Lukasiak (86.34)	6 – 5	Daniel Larsson (81.72)	
11	26 September	Nordic Forum Hotel, Tallinn, Estonia	Petri Rasmus (88.33)	6 – 5	Teemu Harju (82.22)	
12	27 September	Nordic Forum Hotel, Tallinn, Estonia	Jonas Graversen (85.84)	6 – 4	Viktor Tingström (87.87)	

=== ANZ Premier League ===
The second installment of the ANZ Premier League will occur in 2026. Simon Whitlock will return as defending champion. He will be joined by the Trans-Tasmanian Championship winner, the top four non-qualified players from the ADA rankings and the top two non-qualified player from the DPNZ rankings. The winner qualifies for the 2026 Grand Slam of Darts and 2027 PDC World Darts Championship.

No.	Date	Venue	Winner	Legs	Runner-up	Ref.
1	26 September	(Australia) AIS Arena, Canberra	Raymond Smith (94.67)	5 – 1	Ben Robb (79.70)	
2	3 October	(Australia) Adelaide Entertainment Centre	Jonny Tata (91.45)	5 – 2	Tim Pusey (89.30)	
3	10 October	(Australia) Margaret Court Arena, Melbourne	Tim Pusey (87.44)	5 – 4	Mal Cuming (92.44)	
4	16 October	(New Zealand) SkyCity Auckland	Raymond Smith (95.97)	5 – 2	Brody Klinge (94.01)	
5	24 October	(Australia) Newcastle Entertainment Centre	Tim Pusey (86.51)	5 – 3	Simon Whitlock (82.14)	
Finals	31 October	(Australia) Brisbane Entertainment Centre	Raymond Smith (87.28)	10 – 2	Tim Pusey (74.32)	

==== Australian Darts Association (ADA) Tour ====
The Australian Darts Association (ADA) tour increased to 24 events from 12 in 2025. Each event offers AU$5,600 in prize money.

No.	Date	Location	Winner	Legs/Sets	Runner-up	Ref.
1	20–22 February	Silver Sands, Western Australia	Brody Klinge (89.29)	6 – 0	James Bailey (81.88)	
2	20–22 February	Silver Sands, Western Australia	Brody Klinge (92.56)	6 – 3	Darren Penhall (91.60)	
3	20–22 February	Silver Sands, Western Australia	Raymond Smith (90.66)	6 – 2	(Australia) Anthony Shreeve (81.07)	
4	20–22 February	Silver Sands, Western Australia	Raymond Smith (84.50)	2 – 1	(Australia) Michael Bajowski (79.47)	
5	13–15 March	Canberra, Australian Capital Territory	Brody Klinge (93.85)	6 – 2	Darren Penhall (82.71)	
6	13–15 March	Canberra, Australian Capital Territory	Raymond Smith (86.74)	6 – 4	James Bailey (79.10)	
7	13–15 March	Canberra, Australian Capital Territory	Darren Penhall (93.60)	6 – 3	Raymond Smith (98.14)	
8	13–15 March	Canberra, Australian Capital Territory	Brody Klinge (87.64)	2 – 1	Raymond Smith (87.35)	
9	15–17 May	Sandgate, Queensland	Brody Klinge (92.74)	6 – 5	Raymond Smith (88.93)	
10	15–17 May	Sandgate, Queensland	Brody Klinge (97.28)	6 – 4	Raymond Smith (91.55)	
11	15–17 May	Sandgate, Queensland	Raymond Smith (99.83)	6 – 5	Brody Klinge (97.75)	
12	15–17 May	Sandgate, Queensland	Raymond Smith (88.64)	2 – 1	Brody Klinge (81.03)	
13	26–28 June	Melton, Victoria	Tim Pusey (89.66)	6 – 4	Raymond Smith (92.77)	
14	26–28 June	Melton, Victoria	Tim Pusey (87.51)	6 – 5	(Australia) Stuart Coburn (88.95)	
15	26–28 June	Melton, Victoria	Joe Comito (98.52)	6 – 2	(Australia) Howard Jones (91.60)	
16	26–28 June	Melton, Victoria	Tim Pusey (93.48)	2 – 0	Joe Comito (83.40)	
17	7–9 August	Penrith, New South Wales	Brody Klinge (98.21)	6 – 5	Joe Comito (92.74)	
18	7–9 August	Penrith, New South Wales	Tim Pusey (88.80)	6 – 5	Joe Comito (84.12)	
19	7–9 August	Penrith, New South Wales	Michael Bajowski (85.17)	6 – 4	Jeremy Fagg (85.80)	
20	7–9 August	Penrith, New South Wales	Brody Klinge (88.80)	2 – 0	Tim Pusey (79.62)	
21	11–13 September	Elizabeth North, South Australia	Brody Klinge (91.81)	6 – 3	(Australia) Danny Porter (85.40)	
22	11–13 September	Elizabeth North, South Australia	Raymond Smith (98.28)	6 – 3	Brody Klinge (93.41)	
23	11–13 September	Elizabeth North, South Australia	Raymond Smith (90.16)	6 – 5	Brody Klinge (92.53)	
24	11–13 September	Elizabeth North, South Australia	Braidon Charlton (78.47)	2 – 0	(Australia) Stuart Coburn (71.15)	

==== Dartplayers New Zealand (DPNZ) Pro Tour ====
The Dartplayers New Zealand (DPNZ) Pro Tour consists of 12 events over six weekends. Prize money will increase with each event worth NZ$5,000.

No.	Date	Venue	Winner	Legs	Runner-up	Ref.
1	14 February	Kapi Mana Darts, Wellington	Kayden Milne (77.26)	7 – 2	Haupai Puha (72.29)	
2	15 February	Kapi Mana Darts, Wellington	Ben Robb (86.28)	7 – 2	Jonny Tata (81.16)	
3	21 March	CSDA, Christchurch	Kayden Milne (77.94)	7 – 3	Jack Sheppard (73.19)	
4	22 March	CSDA, Christchurch	Ben Robb (81.93)	7 – 5	Mark Cleaver (76.43)	
5	25 April	Sun City, Nelson	Ben Robb (89.18)	7 – 1	(New Zealand) Jordan Bennett-Davies (79.81)	
6	26 April	Sun City, Nelson	Jonny Tata (91.31)	7 – 4	Ben Robb (89.41)	
7	23 May	Howick Club, Auckland	Ben Robb (84.02)	7 – 4	Jonny Tata (88.73)	
8	24 May	Howick Club, Auckland	Jack Sheppard (83.31)	7 – 6	(New Zealand) Jamie Hilton-Jones 78.12	
9	4 July	CSDA, Christchurch	Ben Robb (81.82)	7 – 6	Jonny Tata (85.94)	
10	5 July	CSDA, Christchurch	Russell Joyner (79.34)	7 – 6	Mark Cleaver (81.09)	
11	5 September	Pukekohe Cossie Club, Auckland	Haupai Puha (85.73)	7 – 6	Jonny Tata (87.66)	
12	6 September	Pukekohe Cossie Club, Auckland	Haupai Puha (91.57)	7 – 6	Jonny Tata (88.06)	

=== Steel Tour Japan ===
The Steel Tour Japan is the PDC Global Affiliate Tour for players from Japan. The 2026 calendar consists of 12 events held over three weekends.

No.	Date	Location	Winner	Legs	Runner-up	Ref.
1	5 May	Chiba Central Hall, Chiba	Motomu Sakai (89.91)	5 – 3	Kenichi Ajiki (75.65)	
2	5 May	Chiba Central Hall, Chiba	Keita Ono (89.28)	5 – 3	Motomu Sakai (85.13)	
3	6 May	Chiba Central Hall, Chiba	Yutaka Sunakawa (86.46)	5 – 2	Motomu Sakai (84.23)	
4	6 May	Chiba Central Hall, Chiba	Keita Ono (83.34)	5 – 2	Motomu Sakai (82.07)	
5	15 August	Daito City Civic Hall, Osaka	Ryuta Arihara (95.18)	5 – 2	Ryusei Azemoto (89.27)	
6	15 August	Daito City Civic Hall, Osaka	Motomu Sakai (84.08)	5 – 2	(Japan) Joji Kanuma (81.00)	
7	16 August	Daito City Civic Hall, Osaka	Motomu Sakai (83.44)	5 – 2	(Japan) Tatsuya Uekusa (76.64)	
8	16 August	Daito City Civic Hall, Osaka	Motomu Sakai (88.23)	5 – 2	(Japan) Joji Kanuma (76.90)	
9	22 September	Memorial Hall, Yokohama	Ryusei Azemoto (95.10)	5 – 3	(Japan) Hiroki Kaneko (81.17)	
10	22 September	Memorial Hall, Yokohama	Ryusei Azemoto (88.10)	5 – 4	(Japan) Atsushi Takeuchi (83.15)	
11	23 September	Memorial Hall, Yokohama	Ryusei Azemoto (91.24)	5 – 3	Ryuta Arihara (89.98)	
12	23 September	Memorial Hall, Yokohama	Yuta Hayashi (91.20)	5 – 3	Ryusei Azemoto (85.93)	

=== Championship Darts Latin America and Caribbean (CDLC) Tour ===
The Championship Darts Latin America and Caribbean (CDLC) Tour is the PDC Global Affiliate Tour for players from Latin America and the Caribbean. The 2026 calendar consisted of six events organised over two weekends, the first in Panama and the second in the Bahamas.

No.	Date	Location	Winner	Legs	Runner-up	Ref.
1	23 April	Panama City, Panama	Jesús Sálate (85.08)	6 – 0	Joshua Balfour (74.53)	
2	25 April	Panama City, Panama	Jesús Sálate (97.56)	6 – 1	Victor Guillin (77.21)	
3	26 April	Panama City, Panama	Norman Madhoo (73.24)	6 – 1	Dean Persad (55.44)	
4	24 July	(The Bahamas) Nassau, Bahamas	Jesús Sálate (80.35)	6 – 1	Rashad Sweeting (79.31)	
5	25 July	(The Bahamas) Nassau, Bahamas	Jesús Sálate (93.68)	6 – 5	Rashad Sweeting (87.20)	
6	26 July	(The Bahamas) Nassau, Bahamas	Rashad Sweeting (82.99)	6 – 3	Joshua Balfour (80.96)	

=== African Continental Tour ===
The African Continental Tour is the PDC Global Affiliate Tour for players from Africa. The tour is split into two regions: South and North.

2026 Southern Africa
No.	Date	Location	Winner	Legs	Runner-up	Ref.
1	10–12 April	Kimberley, Northern Cape, South Africa	Johan Geldenhuys (70.96)	8 – 7	Graham Filby (66.93)	
2	5–7 June	Durban, South Africa	Rudie van Staden (89.82)	8 – 4	(South Africa) Giovanni Matthee (78.17)	
3	28–30 August	Gaborone, Botswana	Mitch Minnie (76.25)	8 – 4	(Botswana) Hilton Klein (74.37)	
4	28–29 October	Cape Town, South Africa	Johan Geldenhuys (79.94)	8 – 7	(South Africa) Liam Nicholson (84.56)	
5	30–31 October	Gauteng, South Africa	Cameron Carolissen (89.62)	8 – 5	Johan Geldenhuys (86.60)	

2026 Northern & Eastern Africa
No.	Date	Location	Winner	Legs	Runner-up	Ref.
1	21–22 March	Nairobi, Kenya	Peter Wachiuri (75.71)	8 – 5	Benson Ngari (71.90)	
2	23–24 May	Nairobi, Kenya	Peter Wachiuri (91.88)	8 – 3	(Kenya) Pascal Wamalwa Wanjala (80.58)	
3	25–26 July	Nakuru, Kenya	Dominic Munyao (75.23)	8 – 2	(Kenya) Charles Njuguna (71.33)	
4	19–20 September	Mombasa, Kenya	Joseph Wanjohi (72.46)	8 – 7	Peter Wachiuri (73.67)	

=== China Pro Tour ===
The China Pro Tour is the PDC Global Affiliate Tour for players from China.

No.	Date	Winner	Legs	Runner-up	Ref.
1	11 April	Qingyu Zhan (83.21)	5 – 1	Tong Xu (72.89)	
2	11 April	Xiaochen Zong (83.22)	5 – 3	(China) Kainan Lin (78.22)	
3	12 April	Xiaochen Zong (91.99)	5 – 1	Wenqing Liu (74.67)	
4	12 April	Qingyu Zhan (76.22)	5 – 1	(China) Junlong Yin (75.14)	
5	6 June	Xiaochen Zong (83.38)	5 – 2	Lihao Wen (83.46)	
6	6 June	Jizhou Li (77.33)	5 – 1	(China) Tianxiao Cao (66.87)	
7	7 June	Wenqing Liu (77.55)	5 – 4	(China) Tianxiao Cao (76.76)	
8	7 June	Xiaochen Zong (84.17)	5 – 1	Jizhou Li (72.38)	
9	18 July	Qingyu Zhan (80.60)	5 – 4	Lihao Wen (77.94)	
10	18 July	Lihao Wen (89.27)	5 – 1	Qingyu Zhan (81.94)	
11	19 July	Qingyu Zhan (73.91)	5 – 1	(China) Zhuolun Luo (64.75)	
12	19 July	Xicheng Han (91.03)	5 – 2	Tong Xu (76.62)	
13	22 August	Xiaochen Zong (88.67)	5 – 2	Xicheng Han (70.51)	
14	22 August	Xiaochen Zong (90.48)	5 – 1	(China) Junlong Yin (78.44)	
15	23 August	Xiaochen Zong (86.49)	5 – 2	Yuyi Shao (78.67)	
16	23 August	Xiaochen Zong (79.25)	5 – 4	(China) Tianxiao Cao (76.01)	
17	31 October	Lihao Wen (80.12)	5 – 4	Xiaochen Zong (85.17)	
18	31 October	Yuyi Shao (74.63)	5 – 2	Lihao Wen (71.21)	
19	1 November	Jianjun Jia (63.95)	5 – 3	(China) Chao Geng (67.48)	
20	1 November	Xiaochen Zong (82.80)	5 – 1	(China) Tianxiao Cao (74.10)	

=== Next Gen ===
The PDC Europe Next Gen is the PDC Global Affiliate Tour for players from Germany, Switzerland, Austria, Luxembourg and Liechtenstein. The 2026 season consists of 16 events organised over eight weekends using five different event formats. In 2026, two new formats were introduced: 170, where each leg is played from 170 rather than 501; and Swiss, where the preliminary round will use a Swiss-style league phase. Orders of Merit are maintained for all players, players aged 16–24 and women, with top-ranked players qualifying for the PDC Europe Super League and/or winning free entry to Q-School, Development Tour and Women's Series events.

No.	Date	Location	Format	Winner	Legs	Runner-up	Ref.
1	31 January	(Germany) Hildesheim	FA Cup	Daniel Klose (90.35)	6 – 1	Jaimy van de Weerd (84.56)	
2	1 February	(Germany) Hildesheim	Swiss	Florian Preis (93.24)	6 – 2	Finn Behrens (84.91)	
3	14 February	(Germany) Kalkar	FA Cup	Paul Krohne (99.34)	6 – 1	Jaimy van de Weerd (87.09)	
4	15 February	(Germany) Kalkar	Master Out	Paul Krohne (98.57)	6 – 4	Dragutin Horvat (86.43)	
5	7 March	(Germany) Hildesheim	FA Cup	Patrick Tringler (81.31)	6 – 3	(Germany) Finn Prokop (81.54)	
6	8 March	(Germany) Hildesheim	DIDO	Daniel Klose (70.80)	6 – 5	René Eidams (75.89)	
7	27 June	(Austria) Ried im Innkreis	FA Cup	Patrick Reisenegger (80.34)	6 – 4	René Eidams (78.16)	
8	28 June	(Austria) Ried im Innkreis	170	Daniel Klose (69.26)	11 – 0	Jaimy van de Weerd (59.38)	
9	4 July	(Austria) Ried im Innkreis	FA Cup	Jan Schmidt (88.04)	6 – 5	Jaimy van de Weerd (86.95)	
10	5 July	(Austria) Ried im Innkreis	Master Out	Jaimy van de Weerd (88.13)	6 – 4	Jan Schmidt (90.36)	
11	25 July	(Germany) Hildesheim	FA Cup	Mika Donnevert (86.77)	6 – 1	Jaimy van de Weerd (75.59)	
12	26 July	(Germany) Hildesheim	DIDO	Liam Maendl-Lawrance (80.31)	6 – 3	Kimi Seemann (75.89)	
13	8 August	(Germany) Sindelfingen	FA Cup	Daniel Klose (92.64)	6 – 2	(Germany) Lenny Schlüter (87.15)	
14	9 August	(Germany) Sindelfingen	170	Jaimy van de Weerd (65.11)	11 – 7	(Germany) Lenny Schlüter (70.29)	
15	15 August	(Germany) Sindelfingen	Master Out	Marcel Hausotter (101.33)	6 – 0	(Germany) Tim Scholz (87.55)	
16	16 August	(Germany) Sindelfingen	FA Cup	Dragutin Horvat (91.94)	6 – 5	Jaimy van de Weerd (82.02)	

170 = Each leg is played from 170 rather than 501, DIDO = Double in/double out, FA Cup = Random draw every round, Master Out = Finish on a double or treble, Swiss = The preliminary stage uses a Swiss-system tournament akin to the group stage of the UEFA Champions League.
