= 2027 PDC World Darts Championship =

2026/27 Paddy Power World Darts Championship

Tournament information
- Dates: 11 December 2026 – 3 January 2027
- Venue: Alexandra Palace
- Location: London, England
- Organisation(s): Professional Darts Corporation (PDC)
- Format: Sets; Final – first to 7 sets
- Prize fund: £5,000,000
- Winner's share: £1,000,000

The 2027 PDC World Darts Championship (known for sponsorship reasons as the 2026/27 Paddy Power World Darts Championship) is a professional darts tournament that is scheduled to take place from 11 December 2026 to 3 January 2027 at Alexandra Palace in London, England. The 34th World Darts Championship organised by the Professional Darts Corporation (PDC), it will be the 20th to be staged at Alexandra Palace, where it will be held in the venue's Great Hall for the first time. The tournament's total prize fund will be £5,000,000, of which the winner will receive £1,000,000.

The tournament will feature a 128-player field. The top 32 players in the PDC World Rankings will be seeded for the first round. Luke Littler will be the defending champion, having defeated Gian van Veen 7–1 in the 2026 final.

== Overview ==
=== Background ===
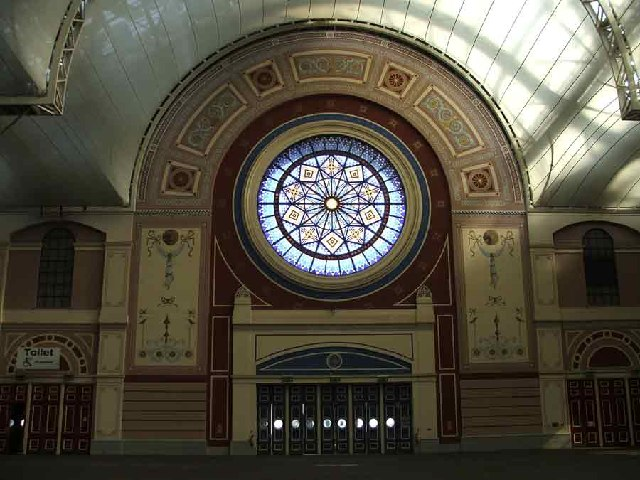
The tournament will be held in Alexandra Palace's Great Hall (pictured in 2005) for the first time.

The Professional Darts Corporation (PDC) was established under the World Darts Council name by the managers John Markovic, Tommy Cox and Dick Allix, along with the world's top 16 players in January 1992 as a separate body that broke away from the British Darts Organisation (BDO). The inaugural edition of the PDC World Darts Championship was held from December 1993 to January 1994 at the Circus Tavern in Purfleet, Essex, England. It was won by Dennis Priestley, who defeated Phil Taylor in the final on 2 January 1994. Taylor would go on to win the tournament 14 times, adding to his BDO World Darts Championship wins in 1990 and 1992 for a record total of 16 world titles, including eight in a row from 1995 to 2002. The PDC World Championship is one of two world championships in the game of darts; the other being the WDF World Darts Championship, which was first held in 2022 as the successor to the BDO event.

The 2027 tournament will be held from 11 December 2026 to 3 January 2027 in London, England. It will be the 34th edition of the event and the 20th to be held at Alexandra Palace, which first served as host venue at the 2008 World Championship. The event will be hosted in Alexandra Palace's Great Hall for the first time after 19 years in the venue's West Hall; the Great Hall was previously used for the News of the World Darts Championship from 1963 to 1976. The move saw an increase in available tickets to 180,000, which will be distributed through a ballot system. Irish gambling company Paddy Power continued its sponsorship of the event, having agreed a renewal of their sponsorship until 2031.

A total of 128 players will compete at the event. Luke Littler will be the defending champion, having defeated Gian van Veen 7–1 in the 2026 final to win his second world title.

=== Format ===
Under the tournament format introduced in 2026, all 128 players, including the 32 seeds, will enter the tournament in the first round. The matches will be in set play format, with the amount of sets required to win a match increasing as the tournament progresses. All non-deciding sets will be played to the best of five legs. In the deciding set, a tie-break rule will be applied if the set score is 2–2, where the first player to lead by two legs will win the set and the match; if the deciding set reaches 5–5, the winner will be decided by a sudden-death leg.

| Round | Best of (sets) | First to (sets) |
|---|---|---|
| First & second | 5 | 3 |
| Third & fourth | 7 | 4 |
| Quarter-finals | 9 | 5 |
| Semi-finals | 11 | 6 |
| Final | 13 | 7 |

=== Ranking ===
The PDC World Rankings (known for sponsorship reasons as the Werner Rankings Ladder) are calculated on a two-year cycle. Prize money won by players in ranking tournaments are removed from their ranking after 104 weeks, meaning players who participated in the 2025 World Championship, who did not lose their PDC Tour Card during the two-year period, will 'defend' their prize money from that event. At the end of the tournament, the prize money won at this tournament will be added and the prize money won at the 2025 tournament will be removed. After the tournament, the top 64 players in the PDC World Rankings will receive a one-year extension on their Tour Card, joined by the players who earned two-year Tour Cards in 2026 who will enter their second year in 2027. Players with two or more years on their Tour Card, who finish outside of the top 64, will lose their Tour Card and see their ranking reset to £0, along with all other players who earned prize money in ranking tournaments without holding a Tour Card.

=== Prize money ===
The prize money breakdown is shown below:

| Position (no. of players) | | Prize money (Total: £5,000,000) |
|---|---|---|
| Winner | (1) | £1,000,000 |
| Runner-up | (1) | £400,000 |
| Semi-finalists | (2) | £200,000 |
| Quarter-finalists | (4) | £100,000 |
| Fourth round losers | (8) | £60,000 |
| Third round losers | (16) | £35,000 |
| Second round losers | (32) | £25,000 |
| First round losers | (64) | £15,000 |

== Qualification ==
The 128-player field comprises three sets of qualification routes. The top 40 players in the two-year PDC World Rankings after the 2026 Players Championship Finals qualify automatically, followed by the next 40 highest-ranked players in the one-year PDC Pro Tour rankings. The remaining 48 places go to various international qualifiers.

=== International qualifiers ===
There will be 48 players who qualify for the tournament through international qualifiers. For the first time, players from Africa were granted two guaranteed spots, separated into a Northern African qualifier and a Southern African qualifier. The Trans-Tasman Championship was also introduced to determine a fourth qualification route for Oceania. As of 14 November 2026, 41 players have secured a place at the tournament through an international qualifier.

List of international qualifiers for the 2027 PDC World Darts Championship
| Event | Dates | Position | Qualifier | Ref. |
|---|---|---|---|---|
| PDC World Youth Championship | 29 November | Winner | | |
| PDC Development Tour | 20 February – 4 October | Third place | Cam Crabtree (ENG) | |
| PDC Development Tour | 20 February – 4 October | Fourth place (Note: As Development Tour winner Sebastian Białecki, second-place finisher Jurjen van der Velde, and fifth-place finisher Owen Bates have qualified via the PDC Pro Tour rankings, extra places will be awarded to the Development Tour.) | Jamai van den Herik (NED) | |
| PDC Development Tour | 20 February – 4 October | Sixth place | Jack Drayton (ENG) | |
| PDC Challenge Tour | 16 January – 27 September | Second place | Derek Coulson (WAL) | |
| PDC Challenge Tour | 16 January – 27 September | Fourth place (Note: As Challenge Tour winner Joe Hunt and third-place finisher Tommy Morris have qualified via the PDC Pro Tour rankings, extra places will be awarded to the Challenge Tour.) | Daniel Klose (GER) | |
| PDC Challenge Tour | 16 January – 27 September | Fifth place | Archie Self (ENG) | |
| ~~Women's World Matchplay~~ | ~~26 July~~ | ~~Winner~~ | ~~Beau Greaves (ENG)~~ (Note: As Women's Series leader and Women's World Matchplay champion Beau Greaves is set to qualify via the PDC Pro Tour rankings, two extra places will be awarded to the Women's Series.) | |
| PDC Women's Series | 7 February – 11 October | Second place | Lisa Ashton (ENG) | |
| PDC Women's Series | 7 February – 11 October | Third place | Fallon Sherrock (ENG) | |
| PDC Women's Series | 7 February – 11 October | Fourth place | Gemma Hayter (ENG) | |
| PDC Women's Series | 7 February – 11 October | Fifth place | Vicky Pruim (SWE) | |
| Steel Tour Japan | 5 May – 23 September | Winner | Motomu Sakai (JPN) | |
| PDC China Championship | 2 November | Winner | Lihao Wen (CHN) | |
| IDC Indian Qualifier | 2–4 October | Winner | Nitin Kumar (IND) | |
| PDC Asian Championship | 14 September | Winner | Paolo Nebrida (PHL) | |
| PDC Asian Championship | 14 September | Runner-up | Kam Weng Cheng (MAC) | |
| PDC Asian Tour | 24 January – 13 September | First place | Ryuta Arihara (JPN) | |
| PDC Asian Tour | 24 January – 13 September | Third place | Christian Perez (PHI) | |
| PDC Asian Tour | 24 January – 13 September | Fourth place | Haruki Muramatsu (JPN) | |
| PDC Asian Tour | 24 January – 13 September | Fifth place | Lok Yin Lee (HKG) | |
| PDC Asian Tour | 24 January – 13 September | Seventh place (Note: As second-place finisher Motomu Sakai and sixth-place finisher Paolo Nebrida qualified by virtue of winning the Steel Tour Japan and reaching the final of the Asian Championship respectively, one place below the original top five qualified for the World Championship.) | Man Lok Leung (HKG) | |
| PDCE Netherlands & Belgium Qualifier | 14 November | Winner | Stef Kosters (NED) | |
| PDCE Mediterranean Qualifier | 6–8 November | Winner | José Marques (POR) | |
| PDCE South-East Europe Qualifier | 28 November | Winner | | |
| PDCE Czechia Qualifier | 29 November | Winner | (CZE) | |
| PDO Polish Qualifier | 13 November | Winner | Dawid Herberg (POL) | |
| PDCE DACH Super League | 10–13 November | Winner | Paul Krohne (GER) | |
| Hungarian Super League | 7 March – 31 October | Winner | András Borbély (HUN) | |
| PDC UK&IRE TCH & AM Qualifier | 28 September | Winner | Carl Wilson (ENG) | |
| PDC North American Championship | 26 June | Winner | Adam Sevada (USA) | |
| CDC Continental Cup | 6–7 November | Winner | Gary Mawson (USA) | |
| CDC Cross-Border Challenge | 17–18 April | Winner | David Cameron (CAN) | |
| CDC Pro Tour | 8 May – 18 October | Top ranked American | Fred Krueger (USA) | |
| CDC Pro Tour | 8 May – 18 October | Top ranked Canadian | Brayden Hall (CAN) | |
| CDLC Tour | 23 April – 26 July | Winner | Jesús Salate (ARG) | |
| PDC Nordic & Baltic Championship | 6–8 November | Winner | Anton Östlund (SWE) | |
| PDCNB Pro Tour | 7 February – 27 September | Winner | Daniel Larsson (SWE) | |
| PDCNB Pro Tour | 7 February – 27 September | Second place | Cor Dekker (NOR) | |
| ANZ Premier League | 26 September – 31 October | Winner | Raymond Smith (AUS) | |
| ADA Tour | 20 February – 13 September | Winner | Brody Klinge (AUS) | |
| DPNZ Pro Tour | 14 February – 6 September | Winner | Ben Robb (NZL) | |
| Trans-Tasman Championship | 30 August | Winner | Mal Cuming (AUS) | |
| African Darts Group – Northern Africa Qualifier | 20 September | Winner | David Munyua (KEN) | |
| African Darts Group – Southern Africa Qualifier | 1 November | Winner | Rudie van Staden (RSA) | |
| PDC Tour Card Holder Qualifier | 30 November | 1 | | |
| PDC Tour Card Holder Qualifier | 30 November | 2 | | |
| PDC Tour Card Holder Qualifier | 30 November | 3 | | |
| PDC Tour Card Holder Qualifier | 30 November | 4 | | |

== Schedule ==
The tournament is scheduled to be played over 36 sessions across 20 days, from 11 December 2026 to the final on 3 January 2027. The order of play for the first round has yet to be announced. All times are given in GMT. The match numbers below are provisional placeholders, not the confirmed order of play. When results become available, the figures beside players' names will indicate their three-dart average in the match, and match winners will be shown in bold.

Friday, 11 December 2026

Evening session (19:00 GMT)
| Match | Round | Player 1 | Score | Player 2 | Sets | | | | |
| Match | Round | Player 1 | Score | Player 2 | 1 | 2 | 3 | 4 | 5 |
|---|---|---|---|---|---|---|---|---|---|
| **01** | 1 | | | | | | | | |
| **02** | 1 | | | | | | | | |
| **03** | 1 | | | | | | | | |
| **04** | 1 | | | | | | | | |

Saturday, 12 December 2026

Afternoon session (12:30 GMT)
| Match | Round | Player 1 | Score | Player 2 | Sets | | | | |
| Match | Round | Player 1 | Score | Player 2 | 1 | 2 | 3 | 4 | 5 |
|---|---|---|---|---|---|---|---|---|---|
| **05** | 1 | | | | | | | | |
| **06** | 1 | | | | | | | | |
| **07** | 1 | | | | | | | | |
| **08** | 1 | | | | | | | | |

Evening session (19:00 GMT)
| Match | Round | Player 1 | Score | Player 2 | Sets | | | | |
| Match | Round | Player 1 | Score | Player 2 | 1 | 2 | 3 | 4 | 5 |
|---|---|---|---|---|---|---|---|---|---|
| **09** | 1 | | | | | | | | |
| **10** | 1 | | | | | | | | |
| **11** | 1 | | | | | | | | |
| **12** | 1 | | | | | | | | |

Sunday, 13 December 2026

Afternoon session (12:30 GMT)
| Match | Round | Player 1 | Score | Player 2 | Sets | | | | |
| Match | Round | Player 1 | Score | Player 2 | 1 | 2 | 3 | 4 | 5 |
|---|---|---|---|---|---|---|---|---|---|
| **13** | 1 | | | | | | | | |
| **14** | 1 | | | | | | | | |
| **15** | 1 | | | | | | | | |
| **16** | 1 | | | | | | | | |

Evening session (19:00 GMT)
| Match | Round | Player 1 | Score | Player 2 | Sets | | | | |
| Match | Round | Player 1 | Score | Player 2 | 1 | 2 | 3 | 4 | 5 |
|---|---|---|---|---|---|---|---|---|---|
| **17** | 1 | | | | | | | | |
| **18** | 1 | | | | | | | | |
| **19** | 1 | | | | | | | | |
| **20** | 1 | | | | | | | | |

Monday, 14 December 2026

Evening session (19:00 GMT)
| Match | Round | Player 1 | Score | Player 2 | Sets | | | | |
| Match | Round | Player 1 | Score | Player 2 | 1 | 2 | 3 | 4 | 5 |
|---|---|---|---|---|---|---|---|---|---|
| **21** | 1 | | | | | | | | |
| **22** | 1 | | | | | | | | |
| **23** | 1 | | | | | | | | |
| **24** | 1 | | | | | | | | |

Tuesday, 15 December 2026

Afternoon session (12:30 GMT)
| Match | Round | Player 1 | Score | Player 2 | Sets | | | | |
| Match | Round | Player 1 | Score | Player 2 | 1 | 2 | 3 | 4 | 5 |
|---|---|---|---|---|---|---|---|---|---|
| **25** | 1 | | | | | | | | |
| **26** | 1 | | | | | | | | |
| **27** | 1 | | | | | | | | |
| **28** | 1 | | | | | | | | |

Evening session (19:00 GMT)
| Match | Round | Player 1 | Score | Player 2 | Sets | | | | |
| Match | Round | Player 1 | Score | Player 2 | 1 | 2 | 3 | 4 | 5 |
|---|---|---|---|---|---|---|---|---|---|
| **29** | 1 | | | | | | | | |
| **30** | 1 | | | | | | | | |
| **31** | 1 | | | | | | | | |
| **32** | 1 | | | | | | | | |

Wednesday, 16 December 2026

Afternoon session (12:30 GMT)
| Match | Round | Player 1 | Score | Player 2 | Sets | | | | |
| Match | Round | Player 1 | Score | Player 2 | 1 | 2 | 3 | 4 | 5 |
|---|---|---|---|---|---|---|---|---|---|
| **33** | 1 | | | | | | | | |
| **34** | 1 | | | | | | | | |
| **35** | 1 | | | | | | | | |
| **36** | 1 | | | | | | | | |

Evening session (19:00 GMT)
| Match | Round | Player 1 | Score | Player 2 | Sets | | | | |
| Match | Round | Player 1 | Score | Player 2 | 1 | 2 | 3 | 4 | 5 |
|---|---|---|---|---|---|---|---|---|---|
| **37** | 1 | | | | | | | | |
| **38** | 1 | | | | | | | | |
| **39** | 1 | | | | | | | | |
| **40** | 1 | | | | | | | | |

Thursday, 17 December 2026

Afternoon session (12:30 GMT)
| Match | Round | Player 1 | Score | Player 2 | Sets | | | | |
| Match | Round | Player 1 | Score | Player 2 | 1 | 2 | 3 | 4 | 5 |
|---|---|---|---|---|---|---|---|---|---|
| **41** | 1 | | | | | | | | |
| **42** | 1 | | | | | | | | |
| **43** | 1 | | | | | | | | |
| **44** | 1 | | | | | | | | |

Evening session (19:00 GMT)
| Match | Round | Player 1 | Score | Player 2 | Sets | | | | |
| Match | Round | Player 1 | Score | Player 2 | 1 | 2 | 3 | 4 | 5 |
|---|---|---|---|---|---|---|---|---|---|
| **45** | 1 | | | | | | | | |
| **46** | 1 | | | | | | | | |
| **47** | 1 | | | | | | | | |
| **48** | 1 | | | | | | | | |

Friday, 18 December 2026

Afternoon session (12:30 GMT)
| Match | Round | Player 1 | Score | Player 2 | Sets | | | | |
| Match | Round | Player 1 | Score | Player 2 | 1 | 2 | 3 | 4 | 5 |
|---|---|---|---|---|---|---|---|---|---|
| **49** | 1 | | | | | | | | |
| **50** | 1 | | | | | | | | |
| **51** | 1 | | | | | | | | |
| **52** | 1 | | | | | | | | |

Evening session (19:00 GMT)
| Match | Round | Player 1 | Score | Player 2 | Sets | | | | |
| Match | Round | Player 1 | Score | Player 2 | 1 | 2 | 3 | 4 | 5 |
|---|---|---|---|---|---|---|---|---|---|
| **53** | 1 | | | | | | | | |
| **54** | 1 | | | | | | | | |
| **55** | 1 | | | | | | | | |
| **56** | 1 | | | | | | | | |

Saturday, 19 December 2026

Afternoon session (12:30 GMT)
| Match | Round | Player 1 | Score | Player 2 | Sets | | | | |
| Match | Round | Player 1 | Score | Player 2 | 1 | 2 | 3 | 4 | 5 |
|---|---|---|---|---|---|---|---|---|---|
| **57** | 1 | | | | | | | | |
| **58** | 1 | | | | | | | | |
| **59** | 1 | | | | | | | | |
| **60** | 1 | | | | | | | | |

Evening session (19:00 GMT)
| Match | Round | Player 1 | Score | Player 2 | Sets | | | | |
| Match | Round | Player 1 | Score | Player 2 | 1 | 2 | 3 | 4 | 5 |
|---|---|---|---|---|---|---|---|---|---|
| **61** | 1 | | | | | | | | |
| **62** | 1 | | | | | | | | |
| **63** | 1 | | | | | | | | |
| **64** | 1 | | | | | | | | |

Sunday, 20 December 2026

Afternoon session (12:30 GMT)
| Match | Round | Player 1 | Score | Player 2 | Sets | | | | |
| Match | Round | Player 1 | Score | Player 2 | 1 | 2 | 3 | 4 | 5 |
|---|---|---|---|---|---|---|---|---|---|
| **65** | 2 | | | | | | | | |
| **66** | 2 | | | | | | | | |
| **67** | 2 | | | | | | | | |
| **68** | 2 | | | | | | | | |

Evening session (19:00 GMT)
| Match | Round | Player 1 | Score | Player 2 | Sets | | | | |
| Match | Round | Player 1 | Score | Player 2 | 1 | 2 | 3 | 4 | 5 |
|---|---|---|---|---|---|---|---|---|---|
| **69** | 2 | | | | | | | | |
| **70** | 2 | | | | | | | | |
| **71** | 2 | | | | | | | | |
| **72** | 2 | | | | | | | | |

Monday, 21 December 2026

Afternoon session (12:30 GMT)
| Match | Round | Player 1 | Score | Player 2 | Sets | | | | |
| Match | Round | Player 1 | Score | Player 2 | 1 | 2 | 3 | 4 | 5 |
|---|---|---|---|---|---|---|---|---|---|
| **73** | 2 | | | | | | | | |
| **74** | 2 | | | | | | | | |
| **75** | 2 | | | | | | | | |
| **76** | 2 | | | | | | | | |

Evening session (19:00 GMT)
| Match | Round | Player 1 | Score | Player 2 | Sets | | | | |
| Match | Round | Player 1 | Score | Player 2 | 1 | 2 | 3 | 4 | 5 |
|---|---|---|---|---|---|---|---|---|---|
| **77** | 2 | | | | | | | | |
| **78** | 2 | | | | | | | | |
| **79** | 2 | | | | | | | | |
| **80** | 2 | | | | | | | | |

Tuesday, 22 December 2026

Afternoon session (12:30 GMT)
| Match | Round | Player 1 | Score | Player 2 | Sets | | | | |
| Match | Round | Player 1 | Score | Player 2 | 1 | 2 | 3 | 4 | 5 |
|---|---|---|---|---|---|---|---|---|---|
| **81** | 2 | | | | | | | | |
| **82** | 2 | | | | | | | | |
| **83** | 2 | | | | | | | | |
| **84** | 2 | | | | | | | | |

Evening session (19:00 GMT)
| Match | Round | Player 1 | Score | Player 2 | Sets | | | | |
| Match | Round | Player 1 | Score | Player 2 | 1 | 2 | 3 | 4 | 5 |
|---|---|---|---|---|---|---|---|---|---|
| **85** | 2 | | | | | | | | |
| **86** | 2 | | | | | | | | |
| **87** | 2 | | | | | | | | |
| **88** | 2 | | | | | | | | |

Wednesday, 23 December 2026

Afternoon session (12:30 GMT)
| Match | Round | Player 1 | Score | Player 2 | Sets | | | | |
| Match | Round | Player 1 | Score | Player 2 | 1 | 2 | 3 | 4 | 5 |
|---|---|---|---|---|---|---|---|---|---|
| **89** | 2 | | | | | | | | |
| **90** | 2 | | | | | | | | |
| **91** | 2 | | | | | | | | |
| **92** | 2 | | | | | | | | |

Evening session (19:00 GMT)
| Match | Round | Player 1 | Score | Player 2 | Sets | | | | |
| Match | Round | Player 1 | Score | Player 2 | 1 | 2 | 3 | 4 | 5 |
|---|---|---|---|---|---|---|---|---|---|
| **93** | 2 | | | | | | | | |
| **94** | 2 | | | | | | | | |
| **95** | 2 | | | | | | | | |
| **96** | 2 | | | | | | | | |

Sunday, 27 December 2026

Afternoon session (12:30 GMT)
| Match | Round | Player 1 | Score | Player 2 | Sets | | | | | | |
| Match | Round | Player 1 | Score | Player 2 | 1 | 2 | 3 | 4 | 5 | 6 | 7 |
|---|---|---|---|---|---|---|---|---|---|---|---|
| **97** | 3 | | | | | | | | | | |
| **98** | 3 | | | | | | | | | | |
| **99** | 3 | | | | | | | | | | |

Evening session (19:00 GMT)
| Match | Round | Player 1 | Score | Player 2 | Sets | | | | | | |
| Match | Round | Player 1 | Score | Player 2 | 1 | 2 | 3 | 4 | 5 | 6 | 7 |
|---|---|---|---|---|---|---|---|---|---|---|---|
| **100** | 3 | | | | | | | | | | |
| **101** | 3 | | | | | | | | | | |
| **102** | 3 | | | | | | | | | | |

Monday, 28 December 2026

Afternoon session (12:30 GMT)
| Match | Round | Player 1 | Score | Player 2 | Sets | | | | | | |
| Match | Round | Player 1 | Score | Player 2 | 1 | 2 | 3 | 4 | 5 | 6 | 7 |
|---|---|---|---|---|---|---|---|---|---|---|---|
| **103** | 3 | | | | | | | | | | |
| **104** | 3 | | | | | | | | | | |
| **105** | 3 | | | | | | | | | | |

Evening session (19:00 GMT)
| Match | Round | Player 1 | Score | Player 2 | Sets | | | | | | |
| Match | Round | Player 1 | Score | Player 2 | 1 | 2 | 3 | 4 | 5 | 6 | 7 |
|---|---|---|---|---|---|---|---|---|---|---|---|
| **106** | 3 | | | | | | | | | | |
| **107** | 3 | | | | | | | | | | |
| **108** | 3 | | | | | | | | | | |

Tuesday, 29 December 2026

Afternoon session (12:30 GMT)
| Match | Round | Player 1 | Score | Player 2 | Sets | | | | | | |
| Match | Round | Player 1 | Score | Player 2 | 1 | 2 | 3 | 4 | 5 | 6 | 7 |
|---|---|---|---|---|---|---|---|---|---|---|---|
| **109** | 3 | | | | | | | | | | |
| **110** | 3 | | | | | | | | | | |
| **111** | 3 | | | | | | | | | | |

Evening session (19:00 GMT)
| Match | Round | Player 1 | Score | Player 2 | Sets | | | | | | |
| Match | Round | Player 1 | Score | Player 2 | 1 | 2 | 3 | 4 | 5 | 6 | 7 |
|---|---|---|---|---|---|---|---|---|---|---|---|
| **112** | 3 | | | | | | | | | | |
| **113** | 4 | | | | | | | | | | |
| **114** | 4 | | | | | | | | | | |

Wednesday, 30 December 2026

Afternoon session (12:30 GMT)
| Match | Round | Player 1 | Score | Player 2 | Sets | | | | | | |
| Match | Round | Player 1 | Score | Player 2 | 1 | 2 | 3 | 4 | 5 | 6 | 7 |
|---|---|---|---|---|---|---|---|---|---|---|---|
| **115** | 4 | | | | | | | | | | |
| **116** | 4 | | | | | | | | | | |
| **117** | 4 | | | | | | | | | | |

Evening session (19:00 GMT)
| Match | Round | Player 1 | Score | Player 2 | Sets | | | | | | |
| Match | Round | Player 1 | Score | Player 2 | 1 | 2 | 3 | 4 | 5 | 6 | 7 |
|---|---|---|---|---|---|---|---|---|---|---|---|
| **118** | 4 | | | | | | | | | | |
| **119** | 4 | | | | | | | | | | |
| **120** | 4 | | | | | | | | | | |

Friday, 1 January 2027

Afternoon session (12:30 GMT)
| Match | Round | Player 1 | Score | Player 2 | Sets | | | | | | | | |
| Match | Round | Player 1 | Score | Player 2 | 1 | 2 | 3 | 4 | 5 | 6 | 7 | 8 | 9 |
|---|---|---|---|---|---|---|---|---|---|---|---|---|---|
| **121** | QF | | | | | | | | | | | | |
| **122** | QF | | | | | | | | | | | | |

Evening session (19:00 GMT)
| Match | Round | Player 1 | Score | Player 2 | Sets | | | | | | | | |
| Match | Round | Player 1 | Score | Player 2 | 1 | 2 | 3 | 4 | 5 | 6 | 7 | 8 | 9 |
|---|---|---|---|---|---|---|---|---|---|---|---|---|---|
| **123** | QF | | | | | | | | | | | | |
| **124** | QF | | | | | | | | | | | | |

Saturday, 2 January 2027

Evening session (19:30 GMT)
| Match | Round | Player 1 | Score | Player 2 | Sets | | | | | | | | | | |
| Match | Round | Player 1 | Score | Player 2 | 1 | 2 | 3 | 4 | 5 | 6 | 7 | 8 | 9 | 10 | 11 |
|---|---|---|---|---|---|---|---|---|---|---|---|---|---|---|---|
| **125** | SF | | | | | | | | | | | | | | |
| **126** | SF | | | | | | | | | | | | | | |

Sunday, 3 January 2027

Evening session (20:00 GMT)
| Match | Round | Player 1 | Score | Player 2 | Sets | | | | | | | | | | | | |
| Match | Round | Player 1 | Score | Player 2 | 1 | 2 | 3 | 4 | 5 | 6 | 7 | 8 | 9 | 10 | 11 | 12 | 13 |
|---|---|---|---|---|---|---|---|---|---|---|---|---|---|---|---|---|---|
| **127** | F | | | | | | | | | | | | | | | | |

== Draw ==
The draw for the tournament will be held ahead of the championship. Of the 128 qualifiers, the top 40 players on the PDC Order of Merit will qualify automatically, alongside the next 40 highest-ranked eligible players on the PDC Pro Tour Order of Merit and 48 international qualifiers. The top 32 players on the PDC Order of Merit will be seeded in standard seeding positions in the first round. The next 32 highest-ranked qualifiers on the PDC Order of Merit will be randomly drawn into the seeded side of the draw. These 64 players will be matched against the remaining 64 qualifiers, who will also be drawn at random.

Numbers to the left of a player's name indicate the 32 seeded players for the tournament. The 48 international qualifiers are indicated by 'Q'. The figures to the right of a player's name show their three-dart average in a match. Players in bold denote match winners.

=== First quarter ===
==== Section 1 ====
**First round** (best of 5 sets); 11–19 December
1 | Luke Littler

**Second round** (best of 5 sets); 20–23 December

**Third round** (best of 7 sets); 27–29 December

**Fourth round** (best of 7 sets); 29–30 December

==== Section 2 ====
**First round** (best of 5 sets); 11–19 December

**Second round** (best of 5 sets); 20–23 December

**Third round** (best of 7 sets); 27–29 December

**Fourth round** (best of 7 sets); 29–30 December

=== Second quarter ===
==== Section 3 ====
**First round** (best of 5 sets); 11–19 December

**Second round** (best of 5 sets); 20–23 December

**Third round** (best of 7 sets); 27–29 December

**Fourth round** (best of 7 sets); 29–30 December

==== Section 4 ====
**First round** (best of 5 sets); 11–19 December

**Second round** (best of 5 sets); 20–23 December

**Third round** (best of 7 sets); 27–29 December

**Fourth round** (best of 7 sets); 29–30 December

=== Third quarter ===
==== Section 5 ====
**First round** (best of 5 sets); 11–19 December

**Second round** (best of 5 sets); 20–23 December

**Third round** (best of 7 sets); 27–29 December

**Fourth round** (best of 7 sets); 29–30 December

==== Section 6 ====
**First round** (best of 5 sets); 11–19 December

**Second round** (best of 5 sets); 20–23 December

**Third round** (best of 7 sets); 27–29 December

**Fourth round** (best of 7 sets); 29–30 December

=== Fourth quarter ===
==== Section 7 ====
**First round** (best of 5 sets); 11–19 December

**Second round** (best of 5 sets); 20–23 December

**Third round** (best of 7 sets); 27–29 December

**Fourth round** (best of 7 sets); 29–30 December

==== Section 8 ====
**First round** (best of 5 sets); 11–19 December

**Second round** (best of 5 sets); 20–23 December

**Third round** (best of 7 sets); 27–29 December

**Fourth round** (best of 7 sets); 29–30 December
