= 2026 World Series of Darts Finals =

Darts tournament

Tournament information
- Dates: 17–20 September 2026
- Venue: AFAS Live
- Location: Amsterdam, Netherlands
- Organisation(s): Professional Darts Corporation (PDC)
- Format: Legs
- Prize fund: £450,000
- Winner's share: £100,000
- High checkout: 170; Daryl Gurney; Gerwyn Price

Champion(s)
- Ross Smith (ENG)

The 2026 World Series of Darts Finals was a professional darts tournament that took place at the AFAS Live in Amsterdam, Netherlands, from 17 to 20 September 2026. It was the 12th staging of the World Series of Darts Finals by the Professional Darts Corporation (PDC). The total prize fund was an increased total of £450,000, with the winner receiving £100,000.

The tournament served as the culmination to the 2026 World Series of Darts, a collection of six unranked events held by the PDC in six different countries. It featured 32 players, comprising the top 24 players from the World Series rankings, the top four non-qualified players from the PDC World Rankings, and four Tour Card holder qualifiers.

Michael van Gerwen was the defending champion, having defeated Luke Littler 11–7 in the 2025 final, but he lost 6–5 to Daryl Gurney in the first round. Ross Smith won the tournament and his first major title since 2022, defeating Gerwyn Price 11–5 in the final.

== Overview ==
=== Background ===
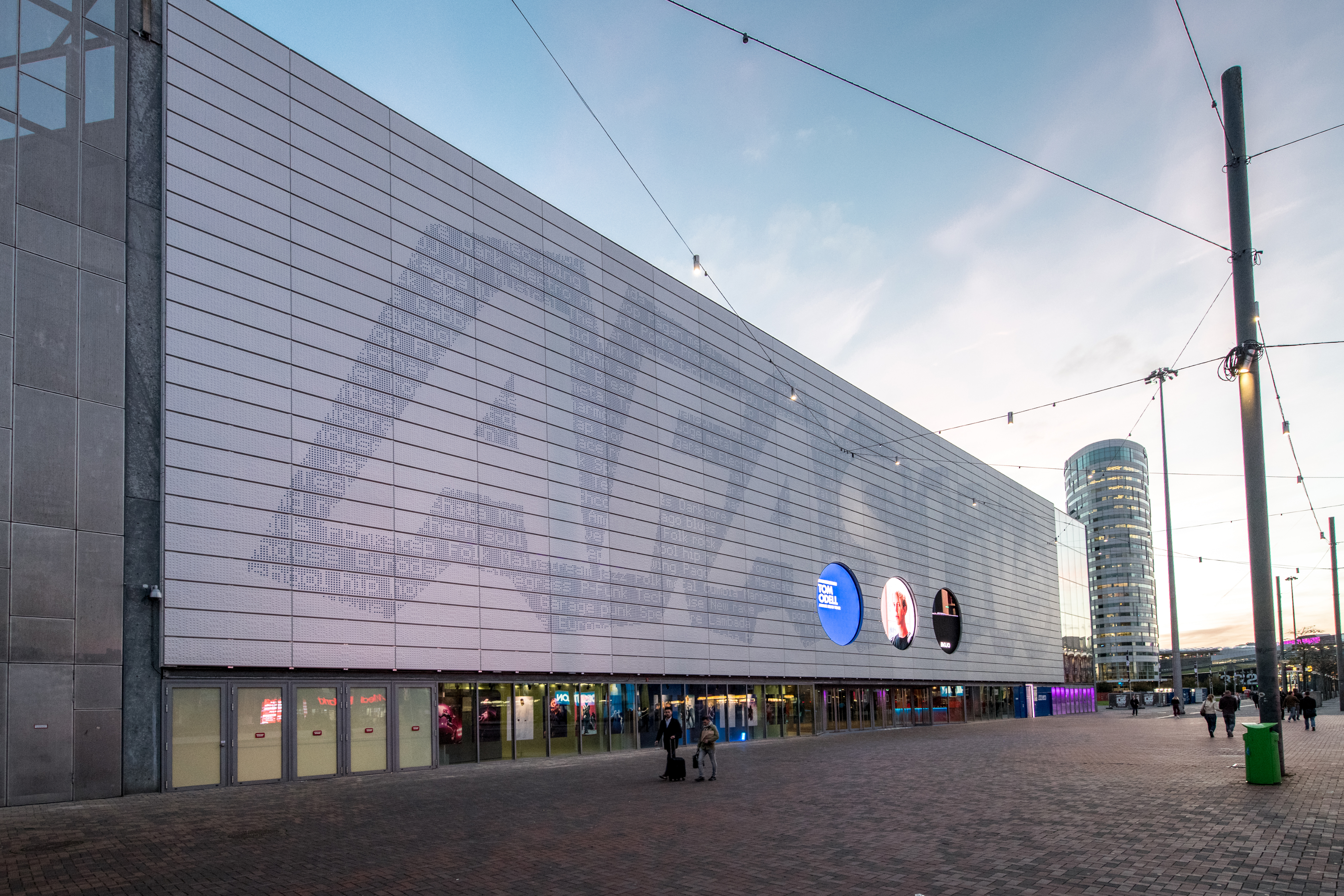
The tournament was held at the AFAS Live (pictured in 2017) in Amsterdam, Netherlands.

The 2026 World Series of Darts Finals was the 12th edition of the tournament to be staged by the Professional Darts Corporation (PDC) since the inaugural edition in 2015. The World Series of Darts was launched by the PDC in 2013 with the aim of growing the popularity of darts around the world. The inaugural year of the tour consisted of two events, the Dubai Masters and the Sydney Masters, which were won by Michael van Gerwen and Phil Taylor, respectively. The format of World Series events pits invited PDC representatives against regional qualifiers in the opening round. As the tour expanded, the World Series of Darts Finals was introduced in 2015, where the top eight players on the World Series rankings and additional international qualifiers would compete to close out the year. The first edition of the tournament was won by Van Gerwen, who defeated Peter Wright 11–10. In 2024, the World Series of Darts Finals expanded from 24 to 32 players.

The 2026 edition took place from 17 to 20 September 2026 at the AFAS Live in Amsterdam, Netherlands. Michael van Gerwen entered the tournament as defending champion, having defeated world champion Luke Littler 11–7 in the 2025 final to win his sixth title.

=== Format ===
The top eight players in the 2026 World Series of Darts rankings were seeded in the first round. All matches were in leg play format, with the number of legs required to win increasing as the tournament progresses:

- First round: Best of 11 legs
- Second round & Quarter-finals: Best of 19 legs
- Semi-finals and final: Best of 21 legs

=== Prize money ===
The prize fund for the event increased to £450,000, up from the previous year's total of £400,000. The winner received £100,000. The prize money breakdown is shown below:

Position (no. of players)		Prize money (Total: £450,000)
Winner	(1)	£100,000
Runner-up	(1)	£60,000
Semi-finalists	(2)	£30,000
Quarter-finalists	(4)	£17,500
Second round	(8)	£10,000
First round	(16)	£5,000

== Qualification ==
The 2026 World Series of Darts consisted of six events:

- 2026 Bahrain Darts Masters
- 2026 Saudi Arabia Darts Masters
- 2026 Nordic Darts Masters
- 2026 US Darts Masters
- 2026 New Zealand Darts Masters
- 2026 Australian Darts Masters

The top 24 players in the 2026 World Series rankings, based on points earned across the six events, qualified for the tournament. They were joined by the top four players in the PDC World Rankings who had not already qualified. Gary Anderson, who had qualified through this route, declined his invitation and was replaced by Jermaine Wattimena. The remaining places went to four PDC Tour Card holders from a qualifying event held in Leicester on 24 August. On 4 September, the PDC announced that Man Lok Leung had withdrawn from the tournament due to illness. He was replaced by Dirk van Duijvenbode. On 9 September, the PDC announced that Lourence Ilagan and Alexis Toylo had withdrawn from the tournament due to visa issues. They were replaced by Daryl Gurney and Maik Kuivenhoven.

The following players qualified for the tournament:

Seeded players

1. Michael van Gerwen (NED) (first round)
2. Gerwyn Price (WAL) (runner-up)
3. Luke Littler (ENG) (quarter-finals)
4. Luke Humphries (ENG) (second round)
5. Gian van Veen (NED) (semi-finals)
6. Jonny Clayton (WAL) (semi-finals)
7. James Wade (ENG) (quarter-finals)
8. Stephen Bunting (ENG) (first round)

World Series rankings qualifiers
- Nathan Aspinall (ENG) (second round)
- Brody Klinge (AUS) (first round)
- Josh Rock (NIR) (quarter-finals)
- Damon Heta (AUS) (first round)
- Raymond Smith (AUS) (first round)
- Danny Noppert (NED) (first round)
- Adam Leek (AUS) (first round)
- ~~Man Lok Leung (HKG)~~
- Jim Long (CAN) (second round)
- Viktor Tingström (SWE) (first round)
- Ross Smith (ENG) (champion)
- Ben Robb (NZL) (first round)
- Motomu Sakai (JPN) (second round)
- Simon Whitlock (AUS) (first round)
- ~~Lourence Ilagan (PHI)~~
- ~~Alexis Toylo (PHI)~~

PDC World Rankings qualifiers
- Ryan Searle (ENG) (second round)
- Wessel Nijman (NED) (second round)
- Chris Dobey (ENG) (first round)
- Jermaine Wattimena (NED) (first round)

Tour Card holder qualifiers
- Callan Rydz (ENG) (first round)
- Rob Cross (ENG) (first round)
- Kevin Doets (NED) (first round)
- Karel Sedláček (CZE) (second round)
- Dirk van Duijvenbode (NED) (quarter-finals)
- Daryl Gurney (NIR) (second round)
- Maik Kuivenhoven (NED) (first round)

== Draw ==
The draw was announced on 2 September. Numbers to the left of a player's name show the seedings for the top 8 in the tournament. The figures to the right of a player's name state their three-dart average in a match. Players in bold denote match winners.

**First round** (best of 11 legs); 17–18 September
1	Michael van Gerwen 96.20	5
**Daryl Gurney 97.70**	**6**
Kevin Doets 95.90	3
**Ross Smith 102.98**	**6**
8	Stephen Bunting 101.10	5
**Josh Rock 102.04**	**6**
Rob Cross 98.14	2
**Ryan Searle 97.59**	**6**
**4**	**Luke Humphries 98.43**	**6**
Jermaine Wattimena 92.61	4
Viktor Tingström 87.18	4
**Dirk van Duijvenbode 93.96**	**6**
**5**	**Gian van Veen 95.47**	**6**
Chris Dobey 83.18	2
**Karel Sedláček 99.37**	**6**
Ben Robb 93.15	4
**2**	**Gerwyn Price 98.98**	**6**
Brody Klinge 96.78	4
Adam Leek 91.02	5
**Jim Long 94.52**	**6**
**7**	**James Wade 92.47**	**6**
Damon Heta 88.41	5
**Wessel Nijman 98.25**	**6**
Simon Whitlock 85.78	4
**3**	**Luke Littler 98.20**	**6**
Danny Noppert 91.76	4
**Nathan Aspinall 95.46**	**6**
Raymond Smith 89.90	4
**6**	**Jonny Clayton 89.37**	**6**
Maik Kuivenhoven 86.31	3
**Motomu Sakai 97.41**	**6**
Callan Rydz 97.00	5

**Second round** (best of 19 legs); 19 September
Daryl Gurney 94.57	5
**Ross Smith 100.30**	**10**
**Josh Rock 95.11**	**10**
Ryan Searle 90.60	7
4	Luke Humphries 99.10	9
**Dirk van Duijvenbode 101.14**	**10**
**5**	**Gian van Veen 101.52**	**10**
Karel Sedláček 103.30	7
**2**	**Gerwyn Price 97.91**	**10**
Jim Long 88.73	5
**7**	**James Wade 101.40**	**10**
Wessel Nijman 98.47	7
**3**	**Luke Littler 98.07**	**10**
Nathan Aspinall 94.52	9
**6**	**Jonny Clayton 90.82**	**10**
Motomu Sakai 90.75	8

**Quarter-finals** (best of 19 legs); 20 September
**Ross Smith 97.54**	**10**
Josh Rock 94.49	7
Dirk van Duijvenbode 94.15	8
**5**	**Gian van Veen 95.04**	**10**
**2**	**Gerwyn Price 103.86**	**10**
7	James Wade 96.58	7
3	Luke Littler 95.85	4
**6**	**Jonny Clayton 96.13**	**10**

**Semi-finals** (best of 21 legs); 20 September
**Ross Smith 90.77**	**11**
5	Gian van Veen 85.84	8
**2**	**Gerwyn Price 104.07**	**11**
6	Jonny Clayton 95.62	7

**Final** (best of 21 legs); 20 September
**Ross Smith 103.89**	**11**
2	Gerwyn Price 97.28	5
