= Motomu Sakai =

Japanese darts player (born 1997)

Motomu Sakai 酒井素
Personal information
- Nickname: "The Creature"
- Born: 3 December 1997 (age 28) Tokyo, Japan

Sport
- Sport: Darts
- Darts: 22.5g Unicorn Signature
- Laterality: Right-handed
- Walk-on music: "Ojamajo Carnival" by Maho

Organisation (see split in darts)
- PDC: 2021–present
- Current world ranking: (PDC) NR (18 October 2026)

PDC premier events – best performances
- World Championship: Last 64: 2026
- World Series Finals: Last 16: 2026

Other tournament wins
- Years
PDC Asian Tour	2025 (x4), 2026 (x2)

Motomu Sakai (酒井素, Sakai Motomu; born 3 December 1997) is a Japanese professional darts player who competes in Professional Darts Corporation (PDC) events.

He made his PDC World Darts Championship debut at the 2026 event, defeating Thibault Tricole 3–0 before losing to Nordic & Baltic qualifier Andreas Harrysson 3–0.

== Early and personal life ==
Sakai was born in Tokyo, Japan on 3 December 1997, During school he was told that he would get popular if he were to start playing darts, which he did and started playing.

== Career ==
Sakai was mainly a soft-tip dart player growing up and improved through live events such as the DARTSLIVE JAPAN tour, where he claimed a few victories. In 2023 he made his PDC Asian Tour debut against Lourence Ilagan where he lost. In the same year he qualified for the PDC Asian Darts Championship, where he made it out the group-stage, where he met Lourence Ilagan and Paul Lim along the way.

In 2024, he was a regular for the PDC Asian Tour, but he did withdraw for the PDC Asian Championship.

He made his breakthrough in 2025, winning 4 titles and beat Lim and Man Lok Leung, his last victory came against Alexis Toylo, before promptly qualifying for the PDC World Darts Championship through the Asian Qualifier.

At the 2026 PDC World Championship, Sakai became a fan-favourite amongst the crowd due to his eccentric walk-on. He beat Thibault Tricole 3–0 in the first round. He lost to Andreas Harrysson 3–0 in the second round.

Sakai made his World Series of Darts debut in the 2026 Bahrain Darts Masters, losing to Gerwyn Price in the first round.

== World Championship results ==
=== PDC ===
- 2026: Second round (lost to Andreas Harrysson 0–3)

== Performance timeline ==
=== PDC ===
Tournament	2023	2025	2026
PDC Ranked televised events
World Championship	Did not qualify		2R
PDC Non-ranked televised events
World Cup	Did not qualify		RR
World Series Finals	Did not qualify		2R
PDC Other events
Asian Championship	SF	SF	RR

==== Asian Tour ====
Season	1	2	3	4	5	6	7	8	9	10	11	12	13	14	15	16	17	18	19	20	21	22	23	24	25	26	27	28
2025					W	L64	L16	F	L128	L16	QF	L128	W	W	L16	QF	SF	W	QF	L128	L16	SF	L32	L128	F	L16	SF	L64
2026	F	L64	SF	SF	L32	L16	L32	QF	L16	SF	SF	SF	QF	L64	F	W	W	SF	L16	L64	QF	L16	QF	L64	L64	QF	L64	L16

==== World Series ====
Tournament	2026
Bahrain Masters	1R
Saudi Masters	1R
