= 2026 Saudi Arabia Darts Masters =

Darts tournament

2026 Riyadh Season Saudi Arabia Darts Masters

Tournament information
- Dates: 19–20 January 2026
- Venue: Global Theatre
- Location: Riyadh, Saudi Arabia
- Organisation(s): Professional Darts Corporation (PDC)
- Format: Legs
- Prize fund: £100,000
- Winner's share: £30,000
- High checkout: 170 Gerwyn Price

Champion(s)
- Luke Littler (ENG)

The 2026 Saudi Arabia Darts Masters (known for sponsorship reasons as the 2026 Riyadh Season Saudi Arabia Darts Masters) was a professional darts tournament held at the Global Theatre in Riyadh, Saudi Arabia, from 19 to 20 January 2026. It was the second event in the 2026 World Series of Darts. The winner received £30,000 from a total prize fund of £100,000. Additionally, a $100,000 (£74,700) bonus was on offer for any player who hit a nine-dart finish during the tournament, with the opportunity to double their prize if they hit an extra dart at the bullseye.

Organised by the Professional Darts Corporation (PDC) as part of Riyadh Season, it was the first PDC event to be staged in Saudi Arabia, following interest shown by PDC president Barry Hearn and General Entertainment Authority chairman Turki Al-Sheikh to bring darts to the country. The tournament featured 16 players (eight PDC representatives and eight Asian representatives).

Luke Littler won the tournament, his fifth World Series title, by defeating Michael van Gerwen 8–5 in the final.

== Overview ==
=== Format ===
Eight elite PDC representatives were drawn to play eight Asian representatives in the first round on Monday 19 January; the quarter-finals, semi-finals and final took place on Tuesday 20 January.

- First round and quarter-finals: Best of eleven legs
- Semi-finals: Best of thirteen legs
- Final: Best of fifteen legs

=== Prize money ===
The total prize fund for the event was £100,000, of which the winner received £30,000. The breakdown of prize money is shown below.

As a special prize for the event, the PDC offered a $100,000 (£74,700) bonus to any player who hit a nine-dart finish during the tournament. Additionally, the player would then be given the chance to hit one dart at the bullseye, known as the Riyadh Season Bullseye, to double their prize to $200,000 (£149,400). No nine-dart finishes were hit.

| Position (no. of players) | | Prize money (Total: £100,000) |
|---|---|---|
| Winner | (1) | £30,000 |
| Runner-up | (1) | £16,000 |
| Semi-finalists | (2) | £10,000 |
| Quarter-finalists | (4) | £5,000 |
| First round | (8) | £1,750 |

=== Broadcasts ===
The tournament was broadcast on ITV4 and ITVX in the United Kingdom. It was also available for subscribers outside of Germany, Austria and Switzerland on the PDC's streaming service, PDCTV. Other broadcasters included Viaplay in the Netherlands, Iceland and Scandinavia; DAZN in Germany, Austria and Switzerland; Fox Sports in Australia; Sky Sport in New Zealand; VTM in Belgium; Nova in Czechia and Slovakia; Pragosport in Hungary; FanDuel TV Extra in the United States; BeIN Sports in the Middle East and North Africa and Arena Sport in Serbia, Bosnia & Herzegovina, Montenegro, North Macedonia & Kosovo; and a number of broadcasters in Saudi Arabia.

== Participants ==
The 16-player lineup was announced on 7 January 2026. The eight PDC representatives were joined by the top eight players from the 2025 PDC Asian Tour rankings. No players from Saudi Arabia took part in the event. Paolo Nebrida was originally invited as an Asian representative but withdrew from the event due to illness, being replaced by Nitin Kumar.

PDC representatives

1. Michael van Gerwen (NED) (runner-up)
2. Gian van Veen (NED) (quarter-finals)
3. Gerwyn Price (WAL) (semi-finals)
4. Nathan Aspinall (ENG) (semi-finals)
5. Luke Littler (ENG) (champion)
6. Luke Humphries (ENG) (quarter-finals)
7. Stephen Bunting (ENG) (quarter-finals)
8. Danny Noppert (NED) (first round)

Asian representatives

1. Alexis Toylo (PHI) (first round)
2. Motomu Sakai (JPN) (first round)
3. Lourence Ilagan (PHI) (first round)
4. Ryusei Azemoto (JPN) (first round)
5. Paul Lim (SIN) (first round)
6. Man Lok Leung (HKG) (quarter-finals)
7. Tomoya Goto (JPN) (first round)
8. Nitin Kumar (IND) (first round)

== Summary ==
=== First round ===
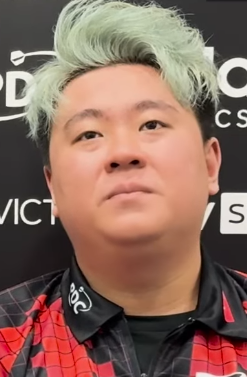
Man Lok Leung became the third Asian player to win a match in World Series history.

The first round took place on 19 January, where seven of the eight PDC representatives won their opening match. The sole PDC representative to lose in the first round was Danny Noppert, who was beaten 6–3 by Man Lok Leung in the tournament opener. Leung became the third Asian player to win a match in World Series history. "It is my first win in the first match [in Saudi Arabia], so this is a big win for me," said Leung afterwards. Luke Littler registered another 6–1 win against Paul Lim, having already defeated him at the Bahrain Darts Masters the week prior. Despite not hitting a maximum and posting a three-dart average of 89.33, Littler only allowed Lim to win the fifth leg of the match. "Obviously it is a very weird atmosphere, it is all new to us players," Littler remarked about the event. "It is a very different environment but as long as you play well you are going to win 90 per cent of the time." Gian van Veen defeated Motomu Sakai 6–2 to set up a tie with Littler in the next round. Michael van Gerwen, the champion in Bahrain, won his opening match 6–1 against Nitin Kumar.

Gerwyn Price produced a whitewash win against Alexis Toylo, hitting a 170 checkout en route. Price highlighted the finish as a turning point in the match after a "slow start", adding: "I want to hit the ground running at the beginning of the season and win here for the first time, and I'm definitely after that nine-darter as well." Facing each other in a third consecutive televised event, Nathan Aspinall defeated Lourence Ilagan 6–1. "There is definitely a long way to go. It's certainly different. I'm not stupid. I feel like they weren't all there of their own accord, shall we say, and it was quite a small venue," Aspinall said about the PDC's first staging in Saudi Arabia. In a statement about Aspinall's comments, the PDC said that he was "reflecting on the fact that this was a first-of-its-kind darts event in the region". Luke Humphries won four consecutive legs to beat Ryusei Azemoto 6–2, while Stephen Bunting defeated Tomoya Goto 6–1. Humphries called his opening match a "decent start" and added: "Everybody wants to be the first player to win this title. It's an exciting tournament and hopefully I can be the first player to put my name on it."

=== Quarter-finals, semi-finals and final ===
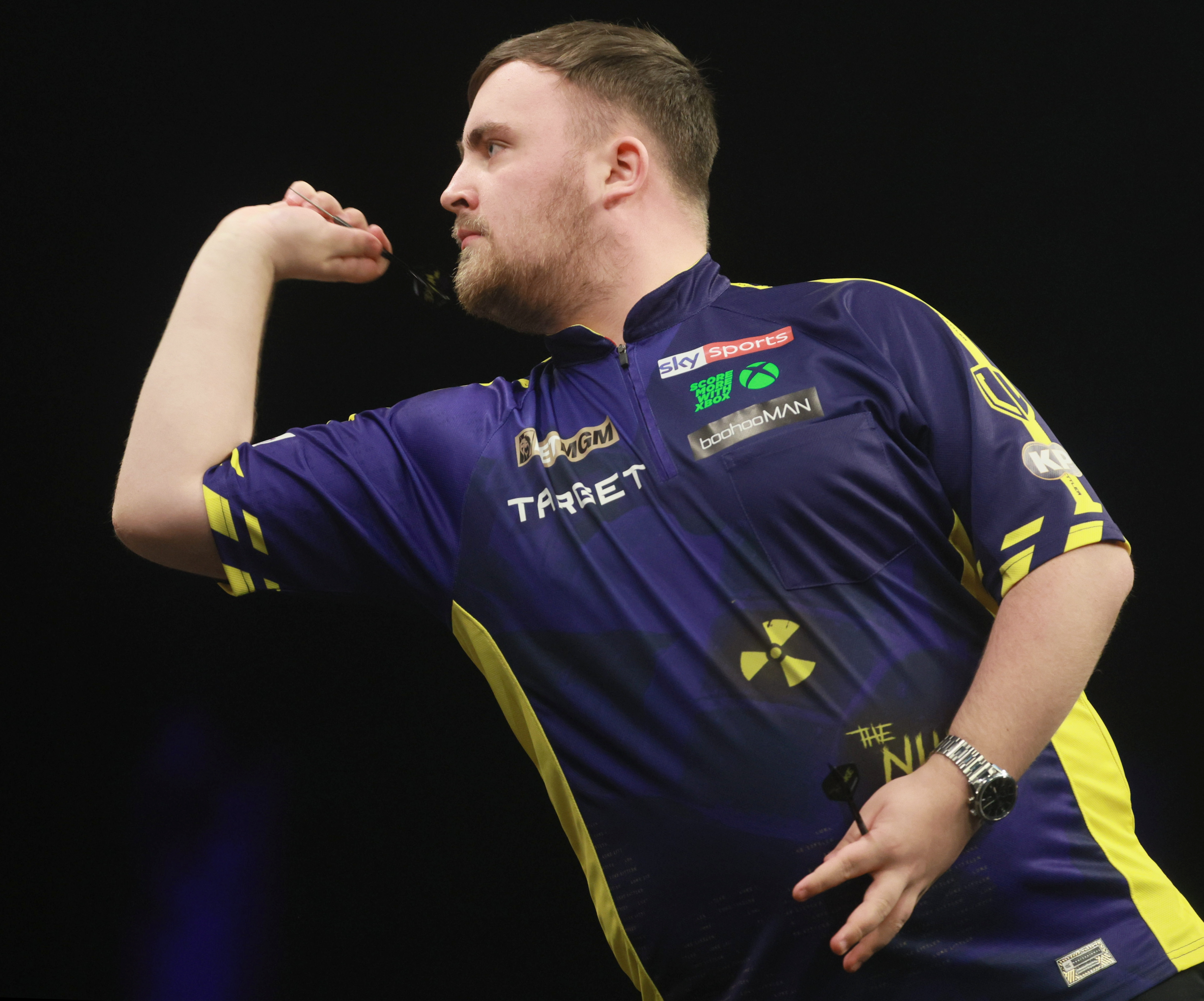
Luke Littler won the inaugural Saudi Arabia Darts Masters, his fifth World Series title.

The quarter-finals, semi-finals and final took place on 20 January. Luke Littler and Gian van Veen faced off in the quarter-finals, their first rematch since the 2026 World Championship final. Van Veen established a 3–0 lead before Littler won the next three legs to level at 3–3. At 4–4, Littler held throw to take the lead and won the match 6–4 with a 124 checkout on the bullseye, ending the match with a three-dart average of 111.58. Luke Humphries went 5–4 ahead against Gerwyn Price but Price claimed victory in a deciding leg. Nathan Aspinall won 6–4 to eliminate Man Lok Leung, while Michael van Gerwen defeated Stephen Bunting by the same scoreline in a match that featured nine consecutive breaks of throw. In the semi-finals, Littler and Van Gerwen earned 7–5 wins over Price and Aspinall respectively, setting up a match between the pair in the inaugural Saudi Arabia Darts Masters final. Van Gerwen was seeking a record-extending 18th World Series title, while Littler was aiming to win his first title since becoming a two-time world champion.

Littler won the first four legs of the final, converting a 132 finish on the bullseye in the second leg. Van Gerwen then claimed the next three legs, reducing his deficit to 4–3 and then 5–4. A run of four consecutive breaks of throw was ended by Littler, who restored a two-leg advantage at 6–4. He went on to win the match 8–5, finishing the match with a 50 checkout. Littler averaged 104.84 in the final, hitting six maximums and recording a checkout success rate of 61.5 per cent. He became the first winner of the Saudi Arabia Darts Masters a day before his 19th birthday, bringing him to a total of five World Series titles. "It didn't work out last week in Bahrain, but I'm really glad to come over to Saudi Arabia for the first time and be the first winner," said Littler, who revealed that he would be celebrating his birthday in Dubai. Previewing the upcoming World Masters tournament, he commented: "I think after the holiday that we are going on, when I am back, I will definitely be practising because it's a title that I've not picked up yet and I definitely want to go to Milton Keynes and I want to become champion." Speaking in defeat, Van Gerwen said that going 4–0 down "didn't really help" him, adding: "Fair play to him [Littler]. He had a fantastic tournament. Sometimes you have to take it on the chin and move on."

== Draw ==
The draw was confirmed on 18 January. Numbers to the left of players' names show the seedings for the top four in the tournament. The figures to the right of a player's name state their three-dart average in a match. Players in bold denote match winners.

**First round** (best of 11 legs); 19 January
**1** | **Michael van Gerwen 91.16** | **6**
Nitin Kumar 79.57 | 1
**Stephen Bunting 93.17** | **6**
Tomoya Goto 85.22 | 1
**4** | **Nathan Aspinall 100.93** | **6**
Lourence Ilagan 81.12 | 1
Danny Noppert 81.25 | 3
**Man Lok Leung 88.09** | **6**
**2** | **Gian van Veen 94.29** | **6**
Motomu Sakai 84.69 | 2
**Luke Littler 89.33** | **6**
Paul Lim 82.66 | 1
**3** | **Gerwyn Price 100.20** | **6**
Alexis Toylo 80.21 | 0
**Luke Humphries 95.56** | **6**
Ryusei Azemoto 83.55 | 2

**Quarter-finals** (best of 11 legs); 20 January
**1** | **Michael van Gerwen 87.98** | **6**
Stephen Bunting 81.11 | 4
**4** | **Nathan Aspinall 99.21** | **6**
Man Lok Leung 97.89 | 4
2 | Gian van Veen 97.91 | 4
**Luke Littler 111.58** | **6**
**3** | **Gerwyn Price 93.37** | **6**
Luke Humphries 91.47 | 5

**Semi-finals** (best of 13 legs); 20 January
**1** | **Michael van Gerwen 100.28** | **7**
4 | Nathan Aspinall 96.75 | 5
**Luke Littler 99.22** | **7**
3 | Gerwyn Price 101.43 | 5

**Final** (best of 15 legs); 20 January
1 | Michael van Gerwen 101.79 | 5
**Luke Littler 104.84** | **8**
