= 2026 US Darts Masters =

Darts tournament

2026 bet365 US Darts Masters

Tournament information
- Dates: 25–26 June 2026
- Venue: Infosys Theater at Madison Square Garden
- Location: New York City, United States
- Organisation(s): Professional Darts Corporation (PDC)
- Format: Legs
- Prize fund: £100,000
- Winner's share: £30,000
- High checkout: 164 Stephen Bunting

Champion(s)
- Luke Humphries (ENG)

The 2026 US Darts Masters (known for sponsorship reasons as the 2026 bet365 US Darts Masters) was a professional darts tournament that took place from 25 to 26 June 2026 at the Infosys Theater at Madison Square Garden in New York City, United States. It was the eighth staging of the tournament by the Professional Darts Corporation (PDC), and was the fourth event in the 2026 World Series of Darts. The total prize fund was £100,000, with the winner receiving £30,000. The North American Championship also took place on the afternoon of 26 June exclusively for the North American representatives, which was won by Adam Sevada.

Sponsored by bet365, the tournament featured 16 players, consisting of eight PDC representatives and eight North American representatives. Luke Humphries was the defending champion, having defeated Nathan Aspinall 8–6 in the 2025 final. Humphries reached his second straight final, where he defeated Luke Littler 8–7 to win his third World Series title and become the first player to retain the US Darts Masters, having survived two match darts from Gian van Veen in the semi-finals.

== Overview ==
=== Format ===
Eight elite PDC representatives were drawn to play eight North American representatives in the first round on Thursday 25 June; the quarter-finals, semi-finals and final took place on Friday 26 June.

- First round and quarter-finals: Best of eleven legs
- Semi-finals: Best of thirteen legs
- Final: Best of fifteen legs

=== Prize money ===
The total prize fund for the event remained at £100,000. The breakdown of prize money is shown below:

Position (no. of players)		Prize money (Total: £100,000)
Winner	(1)	£30,000
Runner-up	(1)	£16,000
Semi-finalists	(2)	£10,000
Quarter-finalists	(4)	£5,000
First round	(8)	£1,750

=== Broadcasts ===
In the United States, the tournament was broadcast on ESPN+ and ESPN2, as part of a deal between the PDC and ESPN that was announced on 25 June 2026. It aired on ITV3 in the United Kingdom with delayed coverage. Other broadcasters included FanDuel TV in the United States; Viaplay in the Netherlands, Iceland, and Scandinavia; DAZN in Germany, Austria, and Switzerland; Canal+ in Poland; Fox Sports in Australia; Sky Sport in New Zealand; VTM in Belgium; AMC Network in Hungary; Zonasport in Croatia; TV3 in the Baltic states; Arena Sport in Serbia, Bosnia and Herzegovina, Montenegro, North Macedonia, and Kosovo; Setanta in Ukraine; and Nova in the Czech Republic and Slovakia. It was also available on the PDC's streaming service, PDCTV, for all subscribers.

== Participants ==
The PDC announced the eight PDC representatives on 24 April. Gian van Veen and Josh Rock made their debuts at the event.

The seedings were based on the 2026 World Series rankings after three events:

1. Luke Littler (ENG) (runner-up)
2. Luke Humphries (ENG) (champion)
3. Gian van Veen (NED) (semi-finals)
4. Gerwyn Price (WAL) (quarter-finals)
5. Stephen Bunting (ENG) (quarter-finals)
6. Jonny Clayton (WAL) (quarter-finals)
7. James Wade (ENG) (semi-finals)
8. Josh Rock (NIR) (first round)

The first three North American representatives, one PDC Tour Card holder and two Championship Darts Circuit (CDC) title winners, were also confirmed on 24 April. They were joined by three qualifiers, as well as the top American player and top Canadian player after the first four events of the 2026 CDC Tour.

Qualification	Player
PDC Tour Card holders	Jim Long (CAN) (quarter-finals)
CDC Continental Cup	Alex Spellman (USA) (first round)
CDC Cross-Border Darts Challenge	David Cameron (CAN) (first round)
CDC qualifiers	Leonard Gates (USA) (first round)
CDC qualifiers	Gary Mawson (USA) (first round)
CDC qualifiers	Fred Krueger (USA) (first round)
Top American player	Adam Sevada (USA) (first round)
Top Canadian player	Brayden Hall (CAN) (first round)

== Summary ==
=== First round ===
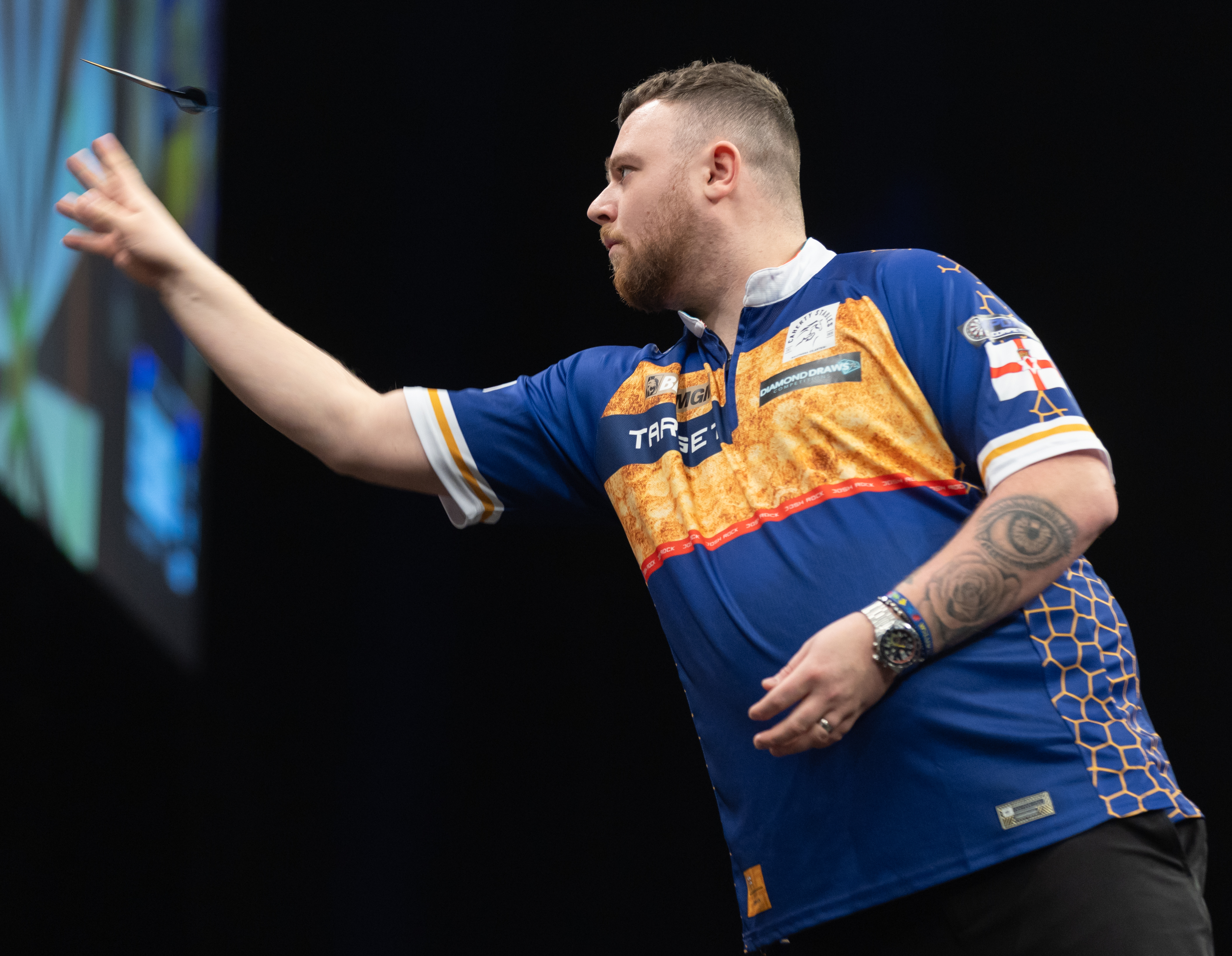
Josh Rock (pictured in 2026) was the sole PDC representative to be eliminated in the first round, losing 6–4 to Canada's Jim Long.

The first round (best of 11 legs) was played on 25 June. Seven of the eight PDC representatives were victorious in the first round. Jim Long emerged as the only North American player to progress to the quarter-finals, defeating US Darts Masters debutant Josh Rock 6–4. "I've played Josh [Rock] three times on the tour so we're familiar with each other, and I was fortunate he missed a couple of doubles at the end there," said the Canadian after the match. Reigning world champion and top seed Luke Littler overcame a 4–3 deficit to claim a 6–4 victory over David Cameron. Defending champion Luke Humphries began his campaign by defeating Leonard Gates 6–1. Speaking afterwards, Humphries hailed the US Darts Masters as a "really prestigious event" in "one of the best venues in the world".

Big-stage newcomers Fred Krueger and Brayden Hall were beaten in their opening matches, losing 6–1 to Gian van Veen and 6–4 to Gerwyn Price, respectively. James Wade made a successful return to the World Series, hitting a 144 checkout before defeating Adam Sevada 6–3. Stephen Bunting and Jonny Clayton were 6–2 winners over Alex Spellman and Gary Mawson; Bunting earned his first win at the event, while Clayton posted a three-dart average of 98.54 in victory.

=== Quarter-finals, semi-finals and final ===
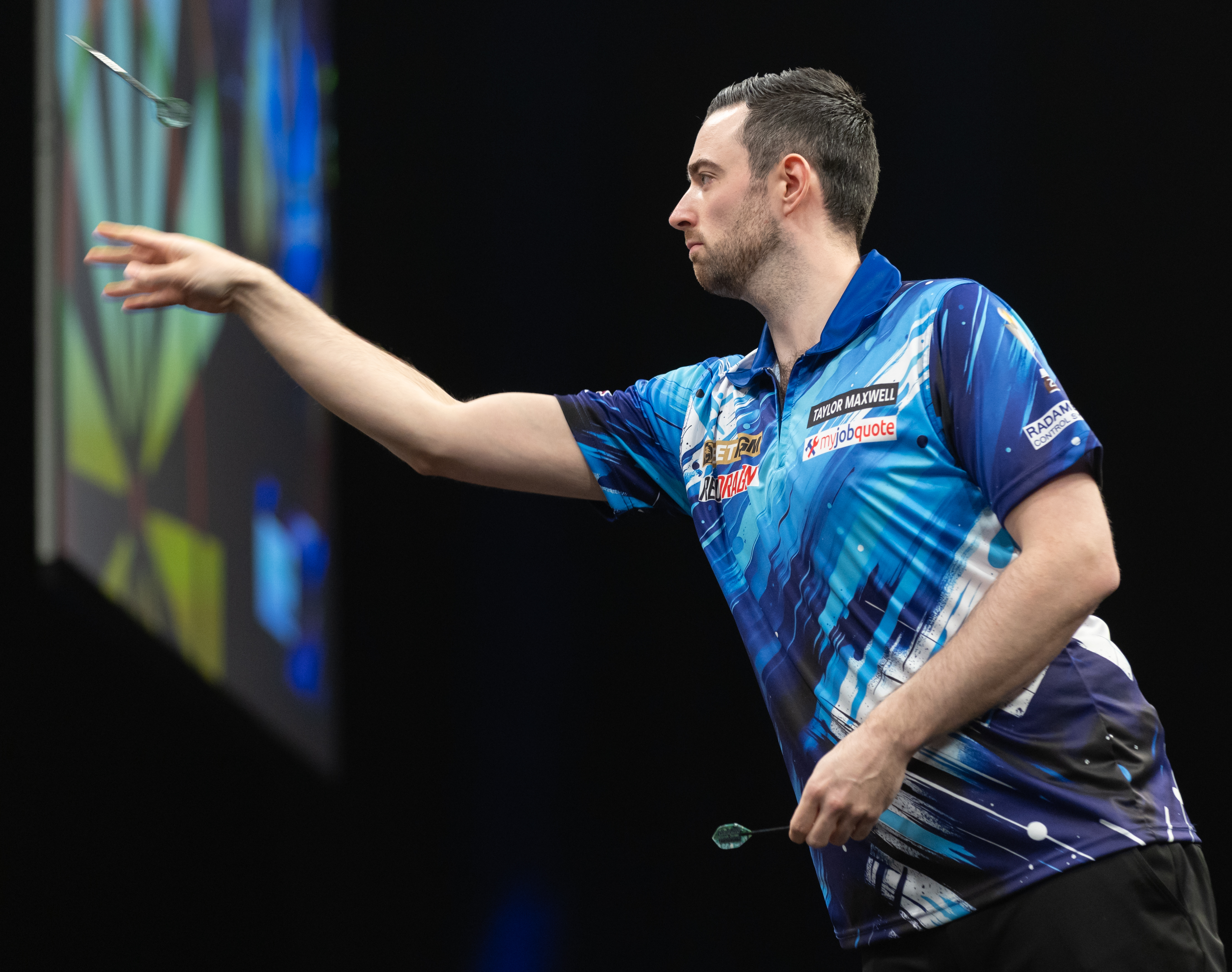
Luke Humphries (pictured in 2026) won his third World Series title and became the first player to retain the US Darts Masters.

The quarter-finals (best of 11 legs), semi-finals (best of 13 legs) and final (best of 15 legs) were played on 26 June. Luke Littler opened the quarter-finals with a 6–1 win over Jim Long, ending the North American representation in the tournament. Gerwyn Price averaged 103.93 but was beaten 6–3 by James Wade. Stephen Bunting landed a 164 checkout, the highest of the tournament, before losing 6–3 to Luke Humphries. Gian van Veen averaged 106.45 on his way to beating Jonny Clayton by the same scoreline. Wade successfully pinned all of his attempts at double but only registered four legs as Littler defeated him 7–4 in the first semi-final. In the other semi-final, Van Veen missed two match darts as Humphries came back from 6–3 down to win 7–6 and advance. This set up a final between the world's top two, Littler and Humphries, who teamed up to win the World Cup of Darts for England earlier in the month. Littler contested his first US Darts Masters final, while Humphries looked to win the tournament for the second year in a row.

Humphries began the final by taking a commanding 4–1 lead, but he missed darts to extend his advantage to four legs, allowing Littler to reduce the deficit to 4–2. The reigning world champion completed a run of four consecutive legs to go 5–4 in front, before Humphries converted a 72 checkout to level the match. From there, the pair went to a deciding leg which Humphries won in 11 darts to seal an 8–7 victory. Humphries finished the match with an average of 104.05, while Littler landed nine maximums as he averaged just under 100.

Humphries won his third World Series title and became the first player to retain the US Darts Masters. "It's great to go back-to-back. I'm always out to set records and do things that not many players have done," said Humphries afterwards, adding that the match was "just another brilliant game in the saga of Luke v Luke". Littler described the event as an "unbelievable experience" and acknowledged the English fans in the crowd, who were in attendance before going to the England national team's match against Panama at the FIFA World Cup the following day.

== Draw ==
The draw was announced on 24 June. Numbers to the left of players' names show the seedings for the top four in the tournament. The figures to the right of a player's name state their three-dart average in a match. Players in bold denote match winners.

**First round** (best of 11 legs); 25 June
**1**	**Luke Littler 87.84**	**6**
David Cameron 80.28	4
Josh Rock 88.25	4
**Jim Long 87.85**	**6**
**4**	**Gerwyn Price 91.83**	**6**
Brayden Hall 78.70	4
**James Wade 82.51**	**6**
Adam Sevada 77.29	3
**2**	**Luke Humphries 91.92**	**6**
Leonard Gates 77.18	1
**Stephen Bunting 90.97**	**6**
Alex Spellman 72.84	2
**3**	**Gian van Veen 91.76**	**6**
Fred Krueger 80.97	1
**Jonny Clayton 98.54**	**6**
Gary Mawson 78.33	2

**Quarter-finals** (best of 11 legs); 26 June
**1**	**Luke Littler 102.15**	**6**
Jim Long 89.38	1
4	Gerwyn Price 103.93	3
**James Wade 102.07**	**6**
**2**	**Luke Humphries 105.70**	**6**
Stephen Bunting 102.72	3
**3**	**Gian van Veen 106.45**	**6**
Jonny Clayton 91.25	3

**Semi-finals** (best of 13 legs); 26 June
**1**	**Luke Littler 97.46**	**7**
James Wade 100.26	4
**2**	**Luke Humphries 101.57**	**7**
3	Gian van Veen 97.24	6

**Final** (best of 15 legs); 26 June
1	Luke Littler 99.50	7
**2**	**Luke Humphries 104.05**	**8**
