= Adam Sevada =

American darts player (born 1985)

Personal information
- Nickname: "The Reaper"
- Born: August 8, 1985 (age 41) Parker, Arizona, U.S.

Sport
- Sport: Darts
- Darts: 22g Red Dragon
- Laterality: Right-handed
- Walk-on music: "Hells Bells" by AC/DC

Organisation (see split in darts)
- PDC: 2024–present
- Current world ranking: (PDC) NR (5 November 2026) (WDF) 112 ▲5 (17 August 2026)

PDC premier events – best performances
- World Championship: Last 64: 2026
- Grand Slam: Group Stage: 2026

Other tournament wins
- Years
North American Championship	2026
CDC Pro Tour (×12)	2021 (×1); 2024 (×2); 2025 (×5); 2026 (×4)

Adam Sevada (born August 8, 1985) is an American darts player who competes in Professional Darts Corporation (PDC) and World Darts Federation (WDF) events. He made his PDC World Darts Championship debut at the 2026 edition, where he reached the second round. He also represented the United States at the 2026 PDC World Cup of Darts alongside teammate Stowe Buntz. In North America, he has won 11 titles on the Championship Darts Circuit (CDC) Pro Tour and is the reigning North American champion.

== Career ==
Before gaining prominence in the Professional Darts Corporation (PDC) and the Championship Darts Circuit (CDC) in the 2020s, Sevada competed in state and national championships as early as 2008. He claimed his first CDC title in September 2021, defeating Stephen Phillips 6–4 to win the fourth event of the CDC's 2021 USA Tour.

In 2024, Sevada made his debut in the PDC's World Series of Darts by qualifying for the 2024 US Darts Masters, where he was beaten by Rob Cross in the first round. He won his next two CDC titles during the final weekend of the 2024 CDC Pro Tour. The following year, Sevada won a total of five titles on the 2025 CDC Pro Tour to top the rankings and secure a debut at the PDC World Darts Championship. He also took part in the preliminary rounds of the 2025 PDC World Masters, finishing second in his group behind Karel Sedláček.

At the 2026 World Championship, he faced fellow North American competitor Matt Campbell in the first round and claimed a 3–1 victory. He was eliminated in a 3–0 defeat to Charlie Manby in the next round. In June 2026, Sevada partnered Stowe Buntz to represent the United States at the 2026 PDC World Cup of Darts. The pair progressed to the second round, where they lost 8–5 to Wales. Later that month, he won the North American Championship for the first time, defeating Jim Long 6–1 in the final.

== Personal life ==
Outside of darts, Sevada works at a funeral home in Parker, Arizona. He is a member of the Colorado River Indian Tribes.

== World Championship results ==
=== PDC ===
- 2026: Second round (lost to Charlie Manby 0–3) (sets)

== Performance timeline ==
Tournament	2021	2024	2025	2026
PDC Ranked televised events
World Championship	DNQ			2R
World Masters	DNP		Prel.	DNP
Grand Slam	DNQ			RR
PDC Non-ranked televised events
World Cup	DNQ			2R
PDC Other events
CDC Continental Cup	QF	QF	SF	
CDC Cross-Border Challenge	NH	DNQ	SF	F
North American Championship	NH	SF	QF	W
Career statistics
Season-end ranking (PDC)	NR		115	

=== CDC Tour ===
Season	1	2	3	4	5	6	7	8	9	10	11	12	13	14	15	16
2021				W	L16	L16										
2024	L16	L16	L32	SF	QF	L32	QF	QF	F	L16	SF	W	L16	W		
2025	SF	SF	W	W	W	W	SF	L16	QF	F	QF	SF	W	SF	QF	F
2026	W	W	QF	L16	W	SF	SF	F	L16	W						

Performance Table Legend
W	Won the tournament	F	Finalist	SF	Semifinalist	QF	Quarterfinalist	#R; RR; Prel.	Lost in # round Round-robin; Preliminary round	DQ	Disqualified
DNQ	Did not qualify	DNP	Did not participate	WD	Withdrew	NH	Tournament not held	#R; RR; Prel.	Lost in # round Round-robin; Preliminary round	NYF	Not yet founded
