= 2026 Bahrain Darts Masters =

Darts tournament

Tournament information
- Dates: 15–16 January 2026
- Venue: Exhibition World Bahrain
- Location: Sakhir, Bahrain
- Organisation(s): Professional Darts Corporation (PDC)
- Format: Legs
- Prize fund: £100,000
- Winner's share: £30,000
- High checkout: 170 Luke Littler

Champion(s)
- Michael van Gerwen (NED)

The 2026 Bahrain Darts Masters was a professional darts tournament that was held at Exhibition World Bahrain in Sakhir, Bahrain, from 15 to 16 January 2026. It was the fourth staging of the tournament by the Professional Darts Corporation (PDC) since the inaugural edition in 2023, and was the first event in the 2026 World Series of Darts. The winner received £30,000 from a total prize fund of £100,000.

The tournament featured 16 players (eight PDC representatives and eight Asian representatives). Stephen Bunting was the defending champion, having defeated Gerwyn Price 8–4 in the 2025 final. However, he lost 6–4 to Michael van Gerwen in the quarter-finals. Van Gerwen went on to win the tournament for the first time, his 17th World Series title, by defeating Gian van Veen 8–6 in the final.

== Overview ==
=== Format ===
Eight elite PDC representatives were drawn to play eight Asian representatives in the first round on Thursday 15 January; the quarter-finals, semi-finals and final took place on Friday 16 January.

- First round and quarter-finals: Best of eleven legs
- Semi-finals: Best of thirteen legs
- Final: Best of fifteen legs

=== Prize money ===
The total prize fund for the event remained at £100,000. The breakdown of prize money is shown below:

Position (no. of players)		Prize money (Total: £100,000)
Winner	(1)	£30,000
Runner-up	(1)	£16,000
Semi-finalists	(2)	£10,000
Quarter-finalists	(4)	£5,000
First round	(8)	£1,750

=== Broadcasts ===
The tournament was broadcast on ITV4 and ITVX in the United Kingdom. It was the first televised tournament on ITV4 of the new multi-year broadcast deal with the PDC. It was also available for subscribers outside of Germany, Austria and Switzerland on the PDC's streaming service, PDCTV. Other broadcasters included Viaplay in the Netherlands, Iceland and Scandinavia; DAZN in Germany, Austria and Switzerland; Fox Sports in Australia; Sky Sport in New Zealand; VTM in Belgium; Nova in Czechia and Slovakia; Network 4 in Hungary; FanDuel TV Extra in the United States; BeIN Sports in the Middle East and North Africa and Arena Sport in Serbia, Bosnia & Herzegovina, Montenegro, North Macedonia & Kosovo.

== Participants ==
The competition hosts announced the first five PDC representatives to play as being Luke Littler, Luke Humphries, Stephen Bunting, Michael van Gerwen and Gerwyn Price, with the remaining 11 players announced on 7 January 2026.

PDC representatives

1. Luke Littler (ENG) (quarter-finals)
2. Luke Humphries (ENG) (quarter-finals)
3. Gian van Veen (NED) (runner-up)
4. Michael van Gerwen (NED) (champion)
5. Stephen Bunting (ENG) (quarter-finals)
6. Danny Noppert (NED) (quarter-finals)
7. Gerwyn Price (WAL) (semi-finals)
8. Nathan Aspinall (ENG) (semi-finals)

The Asian representatives consisted of six invited players, alongside Bahraini players Abdulla Saeed and Basem Mahmood, who earned their places in the tournament through a national qualifying competition in December 2025; Saeed and Mahmood both made their third appearance at the event.

Qualification	Player
Asian invitees	Alexis Toylo (PHI) (first round)
Asian invitees	Lourence Ilagan (PHI) (first round)
Asian invitees	Motomu Sakai (JPN) (first round)
Asian invitees	Ryusei Azemoto (JPN) (first round)
Asian invitees	Paul Lim (SIN) (first round)
Asian invitees	Man Lok Leung (HKG) (first round)
Bahrain qualifiers	Abdulla Saeed (BHR) (first round)
Bahrain qualifiers	Basem Mahmood (BHR) (first round)

== Summary ==
=== First round ===
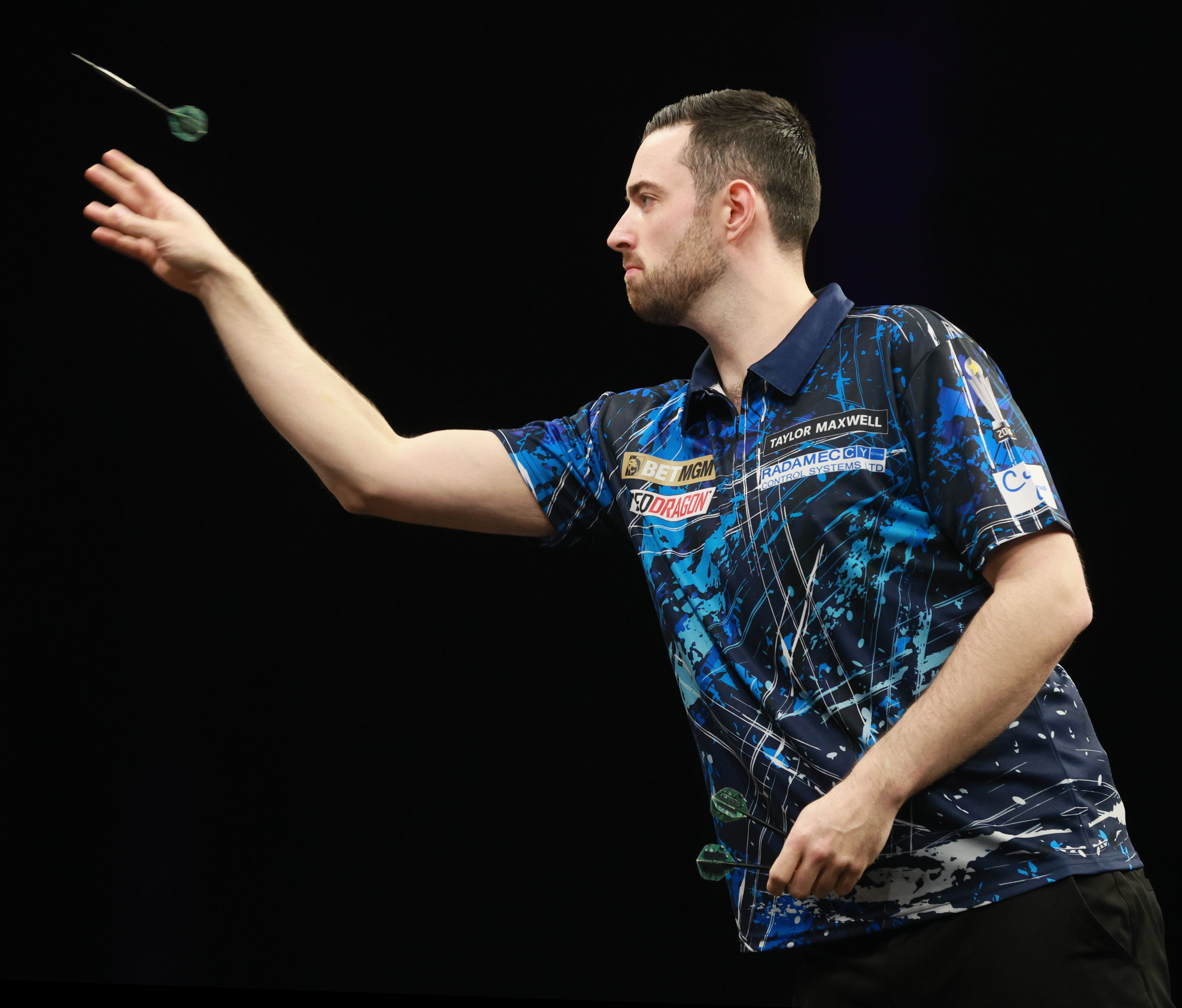
Luke Humphries (pictured in 2025) defeated Bahraini qualifier Abdulla Saeed 6–0 for the third consecutive year.

The first round took place on 15 January, where all eight PDC representatives won their opening match. Competing in his first match since winning the 2026 World Championship, 18-year-old Luke Littler faced 71-year-old Paul Lim. Littler hit six of eight attempts at double and converted a 170 checkout on his way to a 6–1 win, recording a three-dart average of 106.50. "Paul [Lim]'s doing well. He's been doing well for many years," said Littler, who also dismissed the possibility of him playing darts once he reaches Lim's age. Gerwyn Price, the 2025 Bahrain Masters runner-up, defeated Motomu Sakai 6–4 to set up a tie against Littler in the next round. Luke Humphries faced Abdulla Saeed for the third consecutive year, only allowing Saeed one dart at double as he claimed another whitewash victory against the Bahraini qualifier. "I want to come here and start the season a little bit better than I usually do, and I've tried my best to keep in the flow with my practice this year," stated Humphries after the match.

The defending champion Stephen Bunting beat Ryusei Azemoto 6–2, while Michael van Gerwen overturned a 4–3 deficit to defeat 2025 Asian Tour winner Alexis Toylo 6–4. In a rematch of their meeting at the 2026 World Championship, Nathan Aspinall claimed a 6–4 win over Lourence Ilagan, the reigning Asian champion. Making his third appearance at the event, Bahrain's Basem Mahmood won a leg for the first time before losing 6–1 to Danny Noppert. World Championship runner-up Gian van Veen defeated Man Lok Leung 6–2.

=== Quarter-finals, semi-finals and final ===
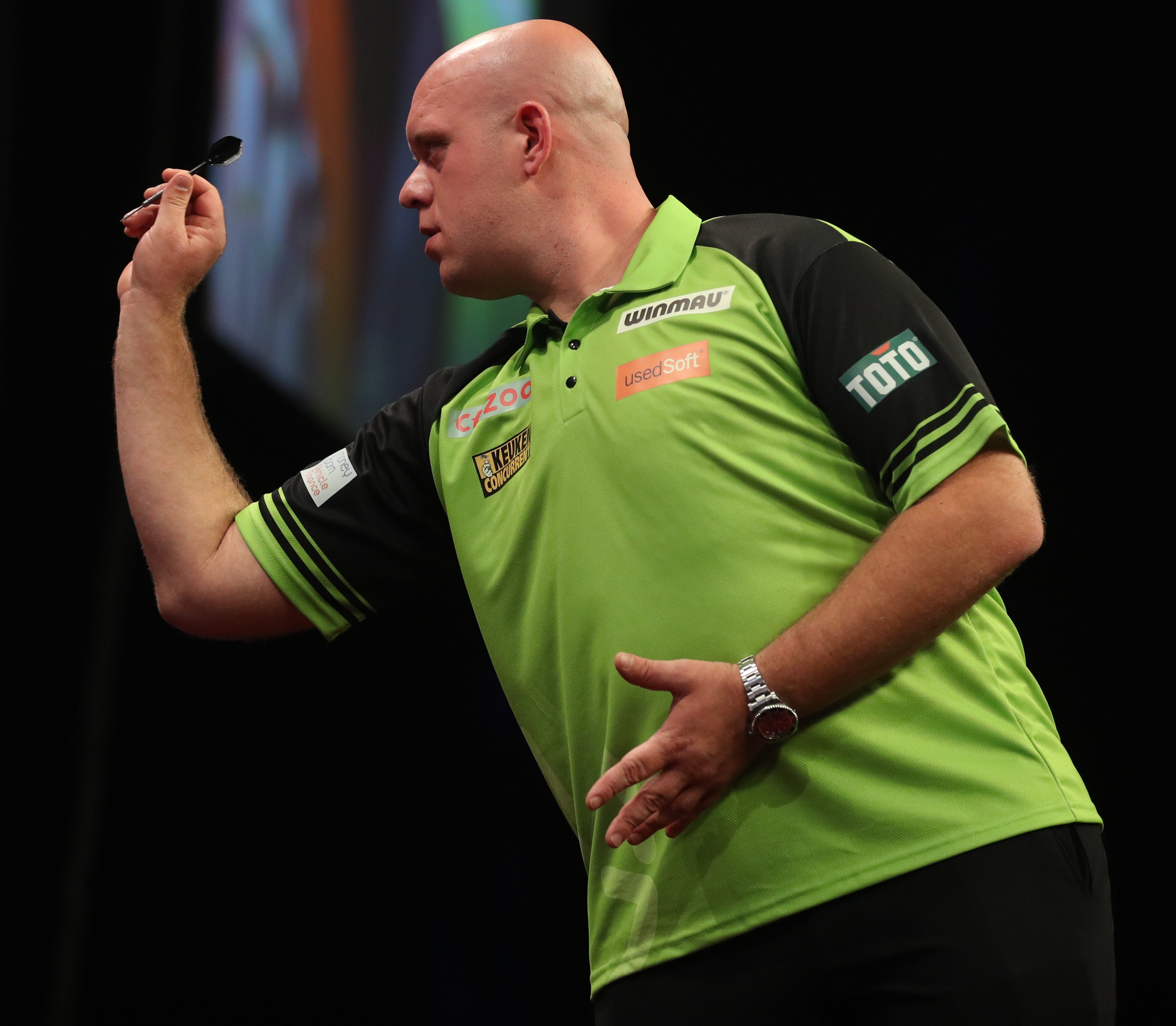
Michael Van Gerwen won his 17th World Series title, his first in Bahrain.

The quarter-finals, semi-finals and final took place on 16 January. Gerwyn Price defeated Luke Littler 6–2, eliminating the reigning world champion in the quarter-finals for the second straight year. The loss marked the end of Littler's 21-match winning streak, with his last defeat being at Players Championship 34 on 30 October 2025. Stephen Bunting's title defence ended as he lost 6–4 to Michael van Gerwen. Nathan Aspinall trailed Luke Humphries 3–1 but won the next five legs to claim a 6–3 victory. The last quarter-final match between Gian van Veen and Danny Noppert saw a brief halt in the action due to a power outage; Van Veen went on to beat his Dutch compatriot 6–1. In the semi-finals, Van Gerwen defeated Price 7–2 and Van Veen earned a 7–4 win against Aspinall, setting up a meeting between the two Dutchmen in the final. Van Gerwen contested his 26th World Series final in his 50th event, while Van Veen reached his first World Series final in his third event.

Van Gerwen started the final with an early break of throw, capitalising on a missed double from Van Veen to take a 1–0 lead with a 130 checkout on the bullseye. He found his second ton-plus finish of the match, a 113 checkout, to extend his advantage to 3–0. Van Veen found a break of his own and a 111 checkout to win his first two legs of the contest, but Van Gerwen then raced into a 6–2 lead. Although Van Veen claimed the next three legs consecutively to reduce the deficit to 6–5, Van Gerwen converted finishes of 103 and 66 to win the match 8–6. Van Gerwen won the Bahrain Masters for the first time, his 17th World Series title in total and his first since January 2024. "It's always special because I've never won here [in Bahrain] but everywhere I go I always want to win," said Van Gerwen after the victory. Speaking about his opponent, he stated: "What Gian [van Veen] has been producing lately, with the World Championship final and now straight away this tournament, we are going to see a lot more of him ... he is a great talent but I feel old now—I'm only 36." Bahrain debutant Van Veen said that he had a "fantastic tournament", adding: "It's good to make two finals in the last couple of weeks, but it's two times runner-up. It's something to work on."

== Draw ==
The draw was confirmed on 14 January. Numbers to the left of players' names show the seedings for the top four in the tournament. The figures to the right of a player's name state their three-dart average in a match. Players in bold denote match winners.

**First round** (best of 11 legs); 15 January
**1**	**Luke Littler 106.50**	**6**
Paul Lim 87.50	1
**Gerwyn Price 86.34**	**6**
Motomu Sakai 89.89	4
**4**	**Michael van Gerwen 96.91**	**6**
Alexis Toylo 91.56	4
**Stephen Bunting 90.00**	**6**
Ryusei Azemoto 82.49	2
**2**	**Luke Humphries 103.66**	**6**
Abdulla Saeed 74.34	0
**Nathan Aspinall 90.61**	**6**
Lourence Ilagan 88.56	4
**3**	**Gian van Veen 90.95**	**6**
Man Lok Leung 84.56	2
**Danny Noppert 92.97**	**6**
Basem Mahmood 74.75	1

**Quarter-finals** (best of 11 legs); 16 January
1	Luke Littler 94.04	2
**Gerwyn Price 97.43**	**6**
**4**	**Michael van Gerwen 97.92**	**6**
Stephen Bunting 98.45	4
2	Luke Humphries 100.86	3
**Nathan Aspinall 104.43**	**6**
**3**	**Gian van Veen 104.31**	**6**
Danny Noppert 106.47	1

**Semi-finals** (best of 13 legs); 16 January
Gerwyn Price 87.88	2
**4**	**Michael van Gerwen 94.21**	**7**
Nathan Aspinall 94.82	4
**3**	**Gian van Veen 97.70**	**7**

**Final** (best of 15 legs); 16 January
**4**	**Michael van Gerwen 100.91**	**8**
3	Gian van Veen 100.79	6
