= Man Lok Leung =

Hong Kong darts player (born 1999)

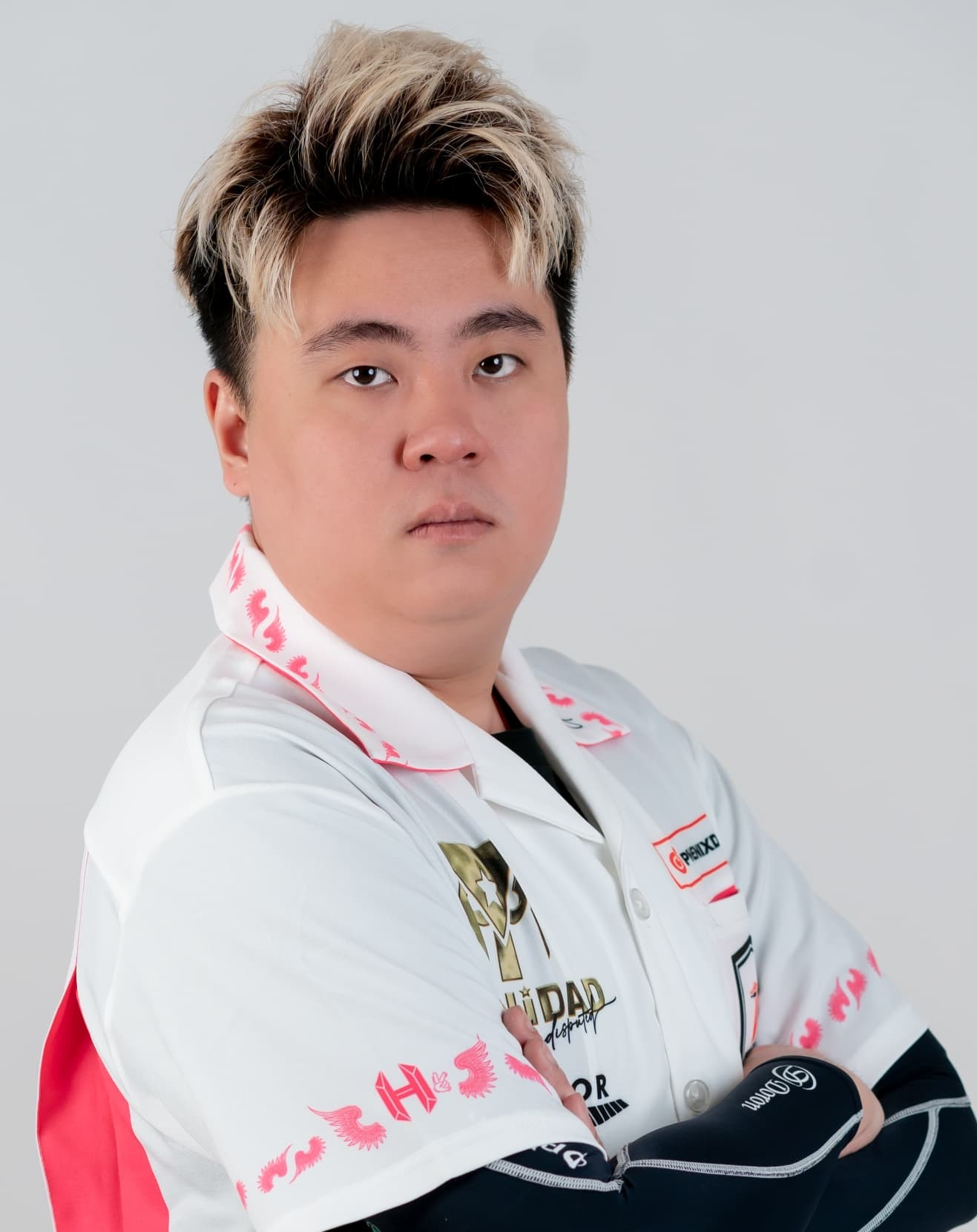
- Leung in 2026

Personal information
- Full name: Hugo Leung Man Lok
- Nickname: "The Challenger"
- Born: 29 March 1999 (age 27) Hong Kong

Sport
- Sport: Darts
- Playing since: 2017
- Darts: 23g Trinidad
- Laterality: Right-handed
- Walk-on music: "Let's Fight" by Ekin Cheng

Organisation (see split in darts)
- PDC: 2017–
- WDF: 2019–2023

PDC premier events – best performances
- World Championship: Last 64: 2024

Other tournament wins
- Years
| Johor Open | 2023 |
| Malaysian Open | 2023 |
| PDC Asian Tour (×9) | 2023 (×3); 2024 (×2); 2025 (×2); 2026 (×2) |
Medal record
Men's Darts
Representing Hong Kong
WDF World Cup
| Silver medal – second place | 2019 Cluj | Men's team |

Hugo Leung Man Lok (Chinese: 梁文洛; born 29 March 1999) is a Hong Kong professional darts player who competes in Professional Darts Corporation (PDC) events. He made his PDC World Darts Championship debut at the 2024 event, where he reached the second round. He has represented Hong Kong at the PDC World Cup of Darts, reaching the quarter-finals of the tournament in 2025 with teammate Lok Yin Lee. He has won nine PDC Asian Tour titles, including three in 2023. Leung also competes in soft-tip darts events in Asia. He was a semi-finalist at the 2025 edition of soft-tip tournament Super Darts.

== Career ==
Leung originally played baseball as a child but began playing darts when he was introduced to it by his mother, who learnt how to play at a bar.

Leung qualified for the 2017 PDC World Youth Championship through the Asian qualifier but was defeated 6–2 by Rhys Hayden in the first round. At the 2019 WDF World Cup, he was part of the Hong Kong team—with Kai Fan Leung, Paul Lim and Royden Lam—that reached the final of the men's teams tournament and lost to Wales. He returned to PDC competition during the 2020 PDC Development Tour, later competing at the 2020 PDC World Youth Championship, reaching the last 32 having won his group. The following year, Leung represented Hong Kong at the 2021 PDC World Cup of Darts alongside Kai Fan Leung, missing match darts to defeat Northern Ireland in the first round. He reached the quarter-finals of the 2022 World Youth Championship. In January 2023, Leung made his World Series of Darts debut as an Asian representative at the 2023 Bahrain Darts Masters. He lost 6–3 to Luke Humphries.

Leung won the opening event of the 2023 PDC Asian Tour and added two more titles during the season. After initially missing out on qualification for the 2024 PDC World Championship, his place at the tournament was confirmed following Haruki Muramatsu's 2023 PDC Asian Championship win, which allowed fifth-placed Leung to qualify through the Asian Tour rankings. On 18 December 2023, Leung made his PDC World Championship debut, coming back from 2–0 down to defeat Gian van Veen 3–2 in an upset victory. His run came to an end in the second round when he was defeated 3–1 by Gabriel Clemens. The next month, Leung faced 2024 World Championship runner-up Luke Littler at the 2024 Bahrain Darts Masters; he took a 2–0 lead before eventually losing 6–3.

Leung represented Hong Kong at the 2025 PDC World Cup of Darts with teammate Lok Yin Lee and the pair progressed from the group stage with victories over the United States and Bahrain. They defeated Sweden 8–4 to advance to the quarter-finals, marking the first time Hong Kong had reached the last eight of the tournament in a decade. They lost to eventual runners-up Wales 8–4. Leung won two titles during the 2025 PDC Asian Tour at events 7 and 15. He finished seventh in the 2025 Asian Tour rankings, which secured him a place at the 2026 PDC World Championship.

== World Championship results ==
=== PDC World Championship ===
- 2024: Second round (lost to Gabriel Clemens 1–3)
- 2026: First round (lost to Ricky Evans 0–3)

== Performance timeline ==
| Tournament | 2017 | 2020 | 2021 | 2022 | 2023 | 2024 | 2025 | 2026 |
|---|---|---|---|---|---|---|---|---|
PDC Ranked televised events
| World Championship | Did not qualify | | | | | 2R | DNQ | 1R |
PDC Non-ranked televised events
| World Cup | DNQ | | 1R | DNQ | RR | RR | QF | RR |
| World Youth Championship | 1R | 2R | DNQ | QF | DNP | | | |
PDC Other events
| Asian Championship | Not held | | | RR | RR | DNP | QF | 2R |

Performance Table Legend
| W | Won the tournament | F | Finalist | SF | Semifinalist | QF | Quarterfinalist | #R; RR; Prel. | Lost in # round Round-robin; Preliminary round | DQ | Disqualified |
| DNQ | Did not qualify | DNP | Did not participate | WD | Withdrew | NH | Tournament not held | #R; RR; Prel. | Lost in # round Round-robin; Preliminary round | NYF | Not yet founded |
