= 2025 in PDC =

Darts tournament series

2025 Professional Darts Corporation season

Tournament information
- Dates: 3 January 2025 – 23 November 2025
- Organisation(s): Professional Darts Corporation
- World Championship: Luke Littler
- World Matchplay: Luke Littler
- Premier League: Luke Humphries
- World Cup: Northern Ireland (Daryl Gurney and Josh Rock)
- Year-end number one: Luke Littler

The year 2025 is the 34th year in the history of the Professional Darts Corporation (PDC), a darts organisation based in the United Kingdom.

== PDC in 2025 ==
=== Order of Merit rule changes ===
A number of PDC Order of Merit rules were changed at the start of the 2025 season.

- The amount of seeded players at the World Grand Prix was increased from eight to sixteen.
- The seeding for the European Tour was reformed; the top sixteen players in the PDC Order of Merit received byes to the second round of each tournament, while the sixteen qualifiers from the PDC Pro Tour Order of Merit played the remaining sixteen qualifiers in the first round.
- Players inside the top 64 of the PDC Order of Merit were prohibited from competing on the 2025 Development Tour and Women's Series.
- The knockout stage of the World Youth Championship was expanded from 32 to 64, meaning two players would qualify from each group.

=== World Masters rebrand ===
The 2025 PDC World Masters was the first edition of the tournament, previously known as simply the Masters, under its new rebrand. The rebrand saw the event name changed to mirror the World Masters organised by the British Darts Organisation and later the World Darts Federation, adopting the tournament's format of set play over the best of three legs per set. It also became a ranked premier event for the first time, and preliminary rounds were introduced to determine eight qualifiers for the tournament, who joined the top 24 in the PDC Order of Merit. The tournament was won by Luke Humphries.

=== Broadcasting deals ===
The PDC and Sky Sports extended their partnership to broadcast darts in the United Kingdom and Ireland until 2030. The organisation also agreed to a broadcasting deal with NBC Sports and its streaming service Peacock, starting from the 2025 Premier League Darts final.

=== Increases to prize money and World Championship field in 2026 ===
On 31 March, the PDC announced an mass increase in prize money for tournaments, starting from the 2026 PDC World Darts Championship, where the champion would receive a doubled top prize of £1,000,000 from a total prize fund of £5,000,000. The field for the World Championship also expanded from 96 to 128 players. The total amount of prize money on offer in PDC events in 2026 went up £7,000,000 from the 2025 season, along with increases for the PDC's secondary tours and a 50% rise in funding for PDC Global Affiliate Tours.

== Premier Events ==
The PDC Premier Events are a series of major professional darts tournaments organised by the PDC. These events are considered the most prestigious in the sport and contain the largest prize funds in the PDC.

=== Ranked ===
These events contribute to a player's ranking on the PDC Order of Merit. The prize money won in these tournaments is added to the player's total earnings over a two-year period, which determines their ranking.

Date	Event	Venue	Champion	Score	Runner-up	Ref.
15 December 2024 – 3 January 2025	2025 World Championship	Alexandra Palace, London, England	Luke Littler (102.73) (Note: Represents a player's three-dart average)	7–3	Michael van Gerwen (100.69)	
30 January – 2 February 2025	World Masters	Marshall Arena, Milton Keynes, England	Luke Humphries (100.42)	6–5	Jonny Clayton (97.99)	
28 February – 2 March 2025	UK Open	Butlin's Minehead, Minehead, England	Luke Littler (101.51)	11–2	James Wade (88.06)	
19–27 July 2025	World Matchplay	Winter Gardens, Blackpool, England	Luke Littler (107.24)	18–13	James Wade (101.54)	
6–12 October 2025	World Grand Prix	Mattioli Arena, Leicester, England	Luke Littler (92.15)	6–1	Luke Humphries (93.61)	
23–26 October 2025	European Championship	Westfalenhallen, Dortmund, Germany	Gian van Veen (101.00)	11–10	Luke Humphries (95.24)	
8–16 November 2025	Grand Slam	WV Active Aldersley, Wolverhampton, England	Luke Littler (100.61)	16–11	Luke Humphries (99.56)	
21–23 November 2025	Players Championship Finals	Butlin's Minehead, Minehead, England	Luke Littler (103.33)	11–8	Nathan Aspinall (93.64)	

=== Non-ranked ===
These events do not affect the PDC Order of Merit.

Date	Event	Venue	Champion	Legs	Runner-up	Ref.
6 February – 29 May	Premier League	The O2 Arena, London, England (Note: The tournament is held across 17 different venues, with the finals being played in The O2 Arena.)	Luke Humphries (97.86)	11–8	Luke Littler (100.29)	
12–15 June	World Cup	Eissporthalle, Frankfurt, Germany	Northern Ireland (95.96) (Josh Rock and Daryl Gurney)	10–9	Wales (92.95) (Jonny Clayton and Gerwyn Price)	
12–14 September	World Series Finals	AFAS Live, Amsterdam, Netherlands	Michael van Gerwen (98.37)	11–7	Luke Littler (101.99)	

==== World Series of Darts ====
The 2025 World Series of Darts was a series of televised darts tournaments organised by the PDC, consisting of seven World Series events and one finals.

All eight events remained the same from the previous year, with the only change being the Nordic Masters being held before the US Masters.

No.	Date	Event	Venue	Champion	Legs	Runner-up	Ref.
1	16–17 January	Bahrain Masters	Bahrain International Circuit, Sakhir, Bahrain	Stephen Bunting (99.33)	8–4	Gerwyn Price (96.64)	
2	24–25 January	Dutch Masters	Maaspoort, Den Bosch, Netherlands	Rob Cross (101.87)	8–5	Stephen Bunting (96.46)	
3	6–7 June	Nordic Masters	Forum Copenhagen, Copenhagen, Denmark	Stephen Bunting (97.49)	8–4	Rob Cross (98.04)	
4	27–28 June	US Masters	Hulu Theater, New York City, United States	Luke Humphries (99.14)	8–6	Nathan Aspinall (92.49)	
5	4–5 July	Poland Masters	Gliwice Arena, Gliwice, Poland	Gerwyn Price (103.12)	8–7	Stephen Bunting (97.95)	
6	8–9 August	Australian Masters	WIN Entertainment Centre, Wollongong, Australia	Luke Littler (99.10)	8–4	Mike De Decker (89.74)	
7	15–16 August	New Zealand Masters	Spark Arena, Auckland, New Zealand	Luke Littler (115.02)	8–4	Luke Humphries (102.31)	

== Pro Tour ==
The 2025 PDC Pro Tour was a series of darts tournaments organised by the PDC, made up of 34 Players Championship events and 14 European Tour events.

=== Tour cards ===
The 2025 PDC Tour Cards were awarded to:

- (64) The top 64 players from the PDC Order of Merit after the 2025 World Championship.
  - 56th-placed Steve Beaton resigned his Tour Card. His spot went to the 65th ranked player, Nick Kenny.
- (28) 28 qualifiers from 2024 Q-School not ranked in the top 64 of the PDC Order of Merit following the World Championship.
  - Leighton Bennett's Tour Card was removed as he had received an eight-year ban from competing in events sanctioned by the Darts Regulation Authority (DRA).
  - Paul Krohne handed in his Tour Card.
- (2) Two highest qualifiers from the 2023 Challenge Tour (Berry van Peer and Owen Bates).
- (1) Highest qualifier from the 2023 Development Tour (Nathan Rafferty).
  - Wessel Nijman, the other highest qualifier from the 2023 Development Tour, was in the top 64 of the PDC Order of Merit, and therefore, one extra Tour Card was awarded to a Q-School qualifier.
- (2) Two highest qualifiers from the 2024 Challenge Tour (Wesley Plaisier and Christian Kist).
- (2) Two highest qualifiers from the 2024 Development Tour (Niko Springer and Sebastian Białecki).
- (8) The daily winners from the 2025 Q-Schools.

Afterwards, the playing field was complemented by the highest qualified players from the Q-School Order of Merit until the maximum number of 128 Pro Tour Card players was reached. In 2025, a total of 21 additional players qualified this way.

==== Q-School ====
The players below earned PDC Tour Cards at Q-School.

UK Q-School
January 9	January 10	January 11	January 12
Tom Bissell (ENG)	Justin Hood (ENG)	Tavis Dudeney (ENG)	Jim Long (CAN)
128 players	127 players	126 players	125 players
European Q-School
January 9	January 10	January 11	January 12
Viktor Tingström (SWE)	Kai Gotthardt (GER)	Dennie Olde Kalter (NED)	Maik Kuivenhoven (NED)
128 players	127 players	126 players	125 players

UK Q-School Order of Merit

1. Bradley Brooks (ENG)
2. Darryl Pilgrim (ENG)
3. Greg Ritchie (SCO)
4. Adam Lipscombe (ENG)
5. Adam Paxton (ENG)
6. Cam Crabtree (ENG)
7. Adam Warner (ENG)
8. Andy Boulton (SCO)
9. Thomas Lovely (ENG)

European Q-School Order of Merit

1. Cor Dekker (NOR)
2. Pero Ljubić (CRO)
3. Karel Sedláček (CZE)
4. Oskar Lukasiak (SWE)
5. Tytus Kanik (POL)
6. Rusty-Jake Rodriguez (AUT)
7. Dominik Grüllich (GER)
8. Stefaan Henderyck (BEL)
9. Maximilian Czerwinski (GER)
10. Max Hopp (GER)
11. Leon Weber (GER)
12. Marvin van Velzen (NED)

== Secondary Tours ==
The 2025 PDC Secondary Tours were series of darts tournaments organised by the PDC predominantly participated in by players without a Tour Card. There were three secondary tours – the Challenge Tour (for players who unsuccessfully participated in the 2025 Q-School), Development Tour (for players aged 16–24) and Women's Series (for female players). All three offered qualification to the 2025 Grand Slam of Darts and 2026 World Championship, while the Challenge and Development Tours offered 2026–27 PDC Tour Cards.

PDC Secondary Tour leaders and earnings (£)
Rank	Challenge Tour		Development Tour		Women's Series	
Rank	Player	Earnings	Player	Earnings	Player	Earnings
1	Stefan Bellmont	11,500	Cam Crabtree (Note: Qualified for the 2026 PDC World Championship via another route.) (Note: Ineligible to receive 2026–27 Tour Card while in the first year of a two-year (2025–26) Tour Card.)	17,775	Beau Greaves	37,600
2	Darius Labanauskas	10,200	Beau Greaves	15,250	Fallon Sherrock	14,600
3	Ted Evetts	8,725	Owen Bates	11,100	Lisa Ashton (Note: Qualified for the 2025 Grand Slam of Darts through a different qualifying route.)	9,900
4	Mervyn King	7,975	Charlie Manby	10,125	Noa-Lynn van Leuven	9,600
5	Michael Unterbuchner	7,825	Jamai van den Herik	9,600	Gemma Hayter	8,500
6	Jamai van den Herik	7,400	Jurjen van der Velde	9,225	Kirsi Viinikainen	6,600

Provisional qualifications earned through secondary tour
2025 Grand Slam of Darts, 2026 PDC World Championship and 2026–27 PDC Tour Card
2026 PDC World Championship and 2026–27 PDC Tour Card
2025 Grand Slam of Darts
2026 PDC World Championship
2026–27 PDC Tour Card

== Global Affiliate Tours ==
The PDC Global Affiliate Tours are a series of regional darts competitions organised by the PDC in collaboration with various local darts organizations around the world.

Under PDC Order of Merit Rule 3.9, first-year Tour Card holders can participate without restrictions, in their second year they may only qualify for a major event if at the entries' closing date they are outside the top 64 of the PDC Order of Merit, and beyond the second year of being a Tour Card Holder they can play but not qualify for any PDC Premier Event via this route.

=== Asian Tour ===
The PDC Asian Tour is the PDC Global Affiliate Tour for players from Asia. The 2025 calendar originally consisted of 24 events organised over six weekends. On 17 June, it was announced that four more events in Qingdao, China on 11–12 September were added to the calendar.

2025 PDC Asian Tour Order of Merit
Rank	Player	Earnings
1	Alexis Toylo	$16,100
2	Motomu Sakai	$13,550
3	Lourence Ilagan	$11,450
4	Ryusei Azemoto	$10,900
5	Paul Lim	$10,300
6	Man Lok Leung	$9,900
7	Paolo Nebrida	$9,850
8	Tomoya Goto	$7,400
9	Keita Ono	$6,950
10	Lok Yin Lee	$5,750
Qualified for the 2026 PDC World Championship

No.	Date	Location	Winner	Legs	Runner-up	Ref.
1	25–26 January	Dubai, United Arab Emirates	Alexis Toylo (94.08)	5 – 3	Tomoya Goto (89.22)	
2	25–26 January	Dubai, United Arab Emirates	Lourence Ilagan (100.65)	5 – 1	Man Lok Leung (88.64)	
3	25–26 January	Dubai, United Arab Emirates	Lourence Ilagan (100.22)	5 – 2	Paolo Nebrida (93.65)	
4	25–26 January	Dubai, United Arab Emirates	Paul Lim (76.60)	5 – 2	Dolreich Tongcopanon (69.71)	
5	12–13 April	Shizuoka, Japan	Motomu Sakai (87.02)	5 – 3	Paul Lim (84.81)	
6	12–13 April	Shizuoka, Japan	Mitsuhiko Tatsunami (90.05)	5 – 2	Seigo Asada (87.50)	
7	12–13 April	Shizuoka, Japan	Man Lok Leung (93.77)	5 – 3	Ryusei Azemoto (89.42)	
8	12–13 April	Shizuoka, Japan	Keita Ono (99.57)	5 – 1	Motomu Sakai (91.88)	
9	3–4 May	Kuala Lumpur, Malaysia	Reynaldo Rivera (89.41)	5 – 4	(Brunei) Abdul Qahar'ukail Haji Shamsul Ariffin (79.76)	
10	3–4 May	Kuala Lumpur, Malaysia	Ryusei Azemoto (111.83)	5 – 1	Teng Lieh Pupo (85.67)	
11	3–4 May	Kuala Lumpur, Malaysia	Keita Ono (88.22)	5 – 2	Tengku Shah (84.85)	
12	3–4 May	Kuala Lumpur, Malaysia	Paul Lim (84.78)	5 – 4	(Brunei) Ak Muhd Hamdi Bin Pg Masshor (83.03)	
13	17–18 May	Ulaanbaatar, Mongolia	Motomu Sakai (100.64)	5 – 3	Man Lok Leung (97.46)	
14	17–18 May	Ulaanbaatar, Mongolia	Motomu Sakai (88.41)	5 – 0	Alain Abiabi (78.85)	
15	17–18 May	Ulaanbaatar, Mongolia	Man Lok Leung (97.22)	5 – 2	Yuta Hayashi (81.84)	
16	17–18 May	Ulaanbaatar, Mongolia	Alain Abiabi (82.67)	5 – 3	Tomoya Goto (79.87)	
17	5–6 July	Singapore	Alexis Toylo (78.78)	5 – 3	(Philippines) John Marco Lumilang (80.24)	
18	5–6 July	Singapore	Motomu Sakai (90.03)	5 – 3	Alexis Toylo (93.66)	
19	5–6 July	Singapore	Alexis Toylo (86.51)	5 – 3	Christian Perez (81.74)	
20	5–6 July	Singapore	Paolo Nebrida (88.13)	5 – 4	Paul Lim (85.40)	
21	2–3 August	Manila, Philippines	Lourence Ilagan (88.98)	5 – 2	Christian Perez (85.95)	
22	2–3 August	Manila, Philippines	Ryusei Azemoto (83.59)	5 – 2	Alexis Toylo (77.52)	
23	2–3 August	Manila, Philippines	Lourence Ilagan (93.94)	5 – 0	Takayuki Masatsu (83.54)	
24	2–3 August	Manila, Philippines	Alexis Toylo (82.52)	5 – 4	Sonny Balagat (78.97)	
25	11–12 September	Qingdao, China	Lok Yin Lee (78.69)	5 – 4	Motomu Sakai (84.41)	
26	11–12 September	Qingdao, China	Alexis Toylo (98.88)	5 – 0	Lourence Ilagan (86.63)	
27	11–12 September	Qingdao, China	Paolo Nebrida (97.51)	5 – 4	Tomoya Goto (90.02)	
28	11–12 September	Qingdao, China	Ryusei Azemoto (89.09)	5 – 3	Man Lok Leung (94.77)	

==== Asian Championship ====
The PDC Asian Championship featured 48 players – national qualifiers and players from the Asian Tour Order of Merit – and took place from 13 to 14 September in Qingdao. The winner, Lourence Ilagan, qualified for the 2025 Grand Slam of Darts. The results of the knockout stage are shown below.

Second round (best of 9 legs); 13 Sep
Alexis Toylo 90.54	5
Mikuru Suzuki 72.08	0
Tomoya Goto 83.36	0
Qingyu Zhan 87.38	5
Ryusei Azemoto 86.38	5
Alain Abiabi 78.75	0
Paul Lim 93.22	5
Xiaochen Zong 80.94	2
Lourence Ilagan 83.30	5
Christian Perez 90.07	3
Paolo Nebrida 90.52	3
Sho Okano 89.20	5
Motomu Sakai 81.07	5
Yuta Hayashi 84.30	2
Man Lok Leung 85.91	5
Chi-Jui Tseng 83.76	3

Quarter-finals (best of 11 legs); 14 Sep
Alexis Toylo 97.10	6
Qingyu Zhan 94.03	5
Ryusei Azemoto 93.46	4
Paul Lim 89.82	6
Lourence Ilagan 91.03	6
Sho Okano 85.30	2
Motomu Sakai 94.88	6
Man Lok Leung 93.87	3

Semi-finals (best of 11 legs); 14 Sep
Alexis Toylo 86.25	6
Paul Lim 80.90	5
Lourence Ilagan 91.62	6
Motomu Sakai 90.33	4

Final (best of 13 legs); 14 Sep
Alexis Toylo 82.50	4
Lourence Ilagan 83.81	7

=== Championship Darts Circuit (CDC) ===
The Championship Darts Circuit (CDC) is the PDC Global Affiliate Tour for players from North America. The 2025 calendar consisted of 16 events organised over six weekends.

No.	Date	Location	Format	Winner	Score	Runner-up	Ref.
1	9–10 May	Niagara Falls, New York, United States		Leonard Gates (89.09)	7 – 4	David Cameron (89.23)	
2	9–10 May	Niagara Falls, New York, United States	Sets	Stowe Buntz (89.70)	5 – 3	Gary Mawson (86.13)	
3	6–8 June	Cambridge, Ontario, Canada	Win by 2 legs	Adam Sevada (91.55)	7 – 5	Stowe Buntz (88.01)	
4	6–8 June	Cambridge, Ontario, Canada		Adam Sevada (94.41)	7 – 3	Stowe Buntz (86.36)	
5	11–13 July	Oakbrook Terrace, Illinois, United States	DIDO	Adam Sevada (85.02)	7 – 6	Jim Long (81.03)	
6	11–13 July	Oakbrook Terrace, Illinois, United States		Adam Sevada (85.59)	7 – 5	Doug Boehm (83.54)	
7	11–13 July	Oakbrook Terrace, Illinois, United States		Stowe Buntz (92.70)	7 – 3	Gary Mawson (81.27)	
8	1–3 August	Brownsburg, Indiana, United States		Darryl Christie (88.49)	7 – 5	Jacob Taylor (87.30)	
9	1–3 August	Brownsburg, Indiana, United States	Sets	David Cameron (93.25)	5 – 4	Jason Brandon (89.75)	
10	1–3 August	Brownsburg, Indiana, United States		Stowe Buntz (97.88)	7 – 6	Adam Sevada (93.43)	
11	22–24 August	Oakbrook Terrace, Illinois, United States		Alex Spellman (97.42)	7 – 0	David Cameron (78.46)	
12	22–24 August	Oakbrook Terrace, Illinois, United States	Win by 2 legs	Stowe Buntz (89.91)	7 – 3	Alex Spellman (82.92)	
13	22–24 August	Oakbrook Terrace, Illinois, United States		Adam Sevada (86.30)	7 – 2	Darryl Christie (82.65)	
14	19–21 September	Brownsburg, Indiana, United States		Jim Long (88.65)	7 – 3	David Cameron (91.68)	
15	19–21 September	Brownsburg, Indiana, United States	DIDO	David Cameron (94.55)	7 – 6	Stowe Buntz (87.60)	
16	19–21 September	Brownsburg, Indiana, United States		Leonard Gates (89.18)	7 – 3	Adam Sevada (88.69)	

==== Cross-Border Darts Challenge ====
The Cross-Border Darts Challenge featured eight players from both Canada and the United States. The event took place in Simi Valley, California on 11–12 April. The winner earned a spot at the 2025 US Darts Masters, but with Leonard Gates already qualified as the winner of the 2024 CDC Continental Cup, the spot was awarded to the top-ranked non-qualified player from the CDC Order of Merit.

First round (best of 9 legs); 11 Apr
USA1	Leonard Gates 88.04	5
Chris Caldwell 75.20	3
CAN4	Jack Robinson 60.04	0
Jake Womack 92.78	5
CAN2	Steve Warnock 92.23	5
Doug Boehm 76.80	1
USA3	Adam Sevada 85.06	5
Kiley Edmunds 85.03	2
CAN1	Jacob Taylor 95.13	5
Gary Mawson 71.12	0
USA4	Alex Spellman 84.63	5
Jason Roker 71.56	2
USA2	Stowe Buntz 87.13	5
Albert Anstey 74.06	2
CAN3	Jeff Smith 92.56	5
Jeff Springer 89.59	3

Quarter-finals (best of 9 legs); 12 Apr
USA1	Leonard Gates 93.88	5
Jake Womack 83.27	3
CAN2	Steve Warnock 79.35	0
USA3	Adam Sevada 100.20	5
CAN1	Jacob Taylor 78.26	2
USA4	Alex Spellman 87.74	5
USA2	Stowe Buntz 81.50	3
CAN3	Jeff Smith 91.98	5

Semi-finals (best of 11 legs); 12 Apr
USA1	Leonard Gates 91.09	6
USA3	Adam Sevada 89.53	3
USA4	Alex Spellman 83.72	1
CAN3	Jeff Smith 91.42	6

Final (best of 13 legs); 12 Apr
USA1	Leonard Gates 98.42	7
CAN3	Jeff Smith 93.33	4

==== North American Championship ====
The North American Championship featured eight players from both Canada and the United States. The event took place in the Theater at Madison Square Garden, New York City on the afternoon of 28 June, in conjunction with the US Darts Masters.

Quarter-finals (best of 11 legs)
1	Matt Campbell 103.98	6
Jason Brandon 90.09	1
4	Jules van Dongen 57.23	0
Stowe Buntz 92.97	6
2	Danny Lauby 85.45	6
Leonard Gates 80.55	1
3	Jim Long 88.92	6
Adam Sevada 84.09	4

Semi-finals (best of 11 legs)
1	Matt Campbell 96.65	6
Stowe Buntz 96.24	2
2	Danny Lauby 78.32	1
3	Jim Long 89.66	6

Final (best of 11 legs)
1	Matt Campbell 85.76	6
3	Jim Long 80.86	3

==== Continental Cup ====
The Continental Cup featured the top 16 players in the CDC rankings at the end of the 2025 season. The event took place at the Columbia Social Club in Philadelphia, Pennsylvania on 17 and 18 October.

First round (best of 9 legs); 17 Oct
1	Adam Sevada 96.96	5
16	John Part 89.54	3
8	Jason Brandon 85.30	5
9	Doug Boehm 83.79	2
4	Leonard Gates 79.33	5
13	Danny Young 75.45	2
5	Alex Spellman 90.63	5
12	Nick Linberg 86.39	3
2	Stowe Buntz 95.29	5
15	Joey Lynaugh 88.04	3
7	Gary Mawson 79.56	5
10	Kiley Edmunds 73.01	3
3	David Cameron 87.13	5
14	Chris McHargue 82.49	2
6	Darryl Christie 85.34	5
11	Kaidon Newberry 78.47	4

Quarter-finals (best of 11 legs); 18 Oct
1	Adam Sevada 86.60	6
8	Jason Brandon 88.11	3
4	Leonard Gates 88.88	5
5	Alex Spellman 89.93	6
2	Stowe Buntz 80.84	6
7	Gary Mawson 76.91	3
3	David Cameron 92.08	6
6	Darryl Christie 90.38	3

Semi-finals (best of 13 legs); 18 Oct
1	Adam Sevada 92.59	5
5	Alex Spellman 88.31	7
2	Stowe Buntz 77.54	4
3	David Cameron 86.21	7

Final (best of 13 legs); 18 Oct
5	Alex Spellman 92.08	8
3	David Cameron 88.68	5

=== ANZ Premier League ===
The ANZ Premier League (known for sponsorship reasons as the Dabble Darts PDC ANZ Premier League) was announced by the PDC in December 2024. The tournament consists of eight nights, held in arenas across Australia and New Zealand every Saturday between 4 October and 22 November. In a format similar to the PDC's Premier League Darts, the first seven nights of the ANZ Premier League see a knockout bracket featuring the eight participants take place. The top four players will then progress to Finals Night, where they will compete in a round-robin tournament, with the top two players advancing to the final.

The tournament will include 2010 PDC World Championship runner-up Simon Whitlock, as well as seven other qualifiers from the DPA, DPNZ and ADA tours. The winner will qualify for the 2026 PDC World Darts Championship.

ANZ Premier League table
Rank	Player	Night wins	Points
1	Raymond Smith	2	22
2	Jonny Tata	2	13
3	Simon Whitlock	0	13
4	Tim Pusey	1	11
5	Brody Klinge	1	9
6	Ben Robb	1	7
7	James Bailey	0	7
8	Joe Comito	0	2

List of participants:

- Simon Whitlock (invited qualifier)
- Joe Comito (DPA Pro Tour – winner)
- Brody Klinge (DPA Pro Tour – runner-up)
- James Bailey (DPA Pro Tour – third place)
- Tim Pusey (ADA Tour – winner)
- Raymond Smith (ADA Tour – runner-up)
- Jonny Tata (DPNZ Pro Tour – winner)
- Ben Robb (DPNZ Pro Tour – playoff winner)

No.	Date	Venue	Winner	Legs	Runner-up	Ref.
1	4 October	John Cain Arena, Melbourne	Jonny Tata (96.03)	5 – 3	Raymond Smith (93.74)	
2	11 October	Newcastle Entertainment Centre	Raymond Smith (86.09)	5 – 3	Simon Whitlock (90.25)	
3	18 October	AIS Arena, Canberra	Ben Robb (83.29)	5 – 2	James Bailey (84.03)	
4	25 October	MyState Bank Arena, Hobart	Brody Klinge (104.65)	5 – 3	Raymond Smith (98.03)	
5	1 November	Adelaide Entertainment Centre	Jonny Tata (85.30)	5 – 2	Simon Whitlock (74.95)	
6	8 November	TSB Arena, Wellington	Tim Pusey (91.24)	5 – 2	Jonny Tata (87.05)	
7	15 November	Gold Coast Convention and Exhibition Centre	Raymond Smith (85.56)	5 – 4	Simon Whitlock (87.00)	
Finals	22 November	Nissan Arena, Brisbane	Simon Whitlock (87.15)	10 – 7	Raymond Smith (86.13)	

Finals Night

Semi-finals (best of 15 legs)
1	Raymond Smith (86.83)	8
4	Tim Pusey (82.78)	2
2	Jonny Tata (74.49)	3
3	Simon Whitlock (82.68)	8

Final (best of 19 legs)
1	Raymond Smith (86.13)	7
3	Simon Whitlock (87.15)	10

==== Dartplayers Australia (DPA) Pro Tour ====
The Dartplayers Australia (DPA) Pro Tour is the PDC Global Affiliate Tour for players from Australia. The 2025 calendar consisted of 15 Pro Tour events organised over five weekends. Events 1, 2 and 3 were held in September 2024 as part of the final weekend of the 2024 DPA Pro Tour. The last weekend was moved to August due to an initial overlap with the World Series Finals.

No.	Date	Venue	Winner	Score	Runner-up	Ref.
4	Saturday 22 February	Commercial Club, Albury	(88.33) Brody Klinge	6 – 3	Koha Kokiri (84.60)	
5	Saturday 22 February	Commercial Club, Albury	(75.15) Darren Penhall	6 – 0	James Bailey (66.33)	
6	Sunday 23 February	Commercial Club, Albury	(81.04) Brody Klinge	3 – 0	Danny Porter (80.37)	
7	Saturday 5 April	Italian Club, Bunbury	(83.87) Stuart Coburn	6 – 5	Joe Comito (82.94)	
8	Saturday 5 April	Italian Club, Bunbury	(80.39) Stuart Coburn	6 – 5	Joe Comito (82.84)	
9	Sunday 6 April	Italian Club, Bunbury	(82.07) James Bailey	3 – 2	Joe Comito (79.76)	
10	Saturday 14 June	Commercial Club, Albury	(75.94) Gordon Mathers	6 – 5	Brody Klinge (79.19)	
11	Saturday 14 June	Commercial Club, Albury	(88.98) Brody Klinge	6 – 1	Brandon Weening (81.05)	
12	Sunday 15 June	Commercial Club, Albury	(92.31) Brody Klinge	3 – 0	Keith Charchalis (79.38)	
13	Saturday 12 July	Bowls Club, Warilla	(89.68) Joe Comito	6 – 4	Tim Pusey (84.17)	
14	Saturday 12 July	Bowls Club, Warilla	(85.26) Tim Pusey	6 – 5	Brandon Weening (83.79)	
15	Sunday 13 July	Bowls Club, Warilla	(88.26) Tim Pusey	3 – 0	Joe Comito (88.19)	
16	Saturday 30 August	Commercial Club, Albury	(92.88) Joe Comito	6 – 4	Stuart Coburn (86.04)	
17	Saturday 30 August	Commercial Club, Albury	(96.66) Brody Klinge	6 – 2	Joe Comito (86.95)	
18	Sunday 31 August	Commercial Club, Albury	(85.32) Brody Klinge	3 – 0	Dave Hanel (75.96)	

==== Dartplayers New Zealand (DPNZ) Pro Tour ====
The Dartplayers New Zealand (DPNZ) Pro Tour is the PDC Global Affiliate Tour for players from New Zealand. The 2025 calendar consisted of 12 Pro Tour events organised over six weekends.

No.	Date	Venue	Winner	Legs	Runner-up	Ref.
1	Saturday 15 February	Kapi Mana Darts, Wellington	(73.60) Mark Cleaver	7 – 2	Jaymie Hilton-Jones (62.10)	
2	Sunday 16 February	Kapi Mana Darts, Wellington	(73.22) Mark Cleaver	7 – 5	Jaymie Hilton-Jones (68.11)	
3	Saturday 22 March	CSDA, Christchurch	(85.90) John Hurring	7 – 6	Ben Robb (80.14)	
4	Sunday 23 March	CSDA, Christchurch	(88.72) John Hurring	7 – 5	Ben Robb (88.68)	
5	Saturday 26 April	Sun City, Nelson	(84.20) Jack Sheppard	7 – 4	Charles Hautapu (79.68)	
6	Sunday 27 April	Sun City, Nelson	(95.47) Jonny Tata	7 – 4	Haupai Puha (86.78)	
7	Saturday 24 May	River City Darts Club, Hamilton	(85.40) Haupai Puha	7 – 2	John Hurring (83.25)	
8	Sunday 25 May	River City Darts Club, Hamilton	(87.68) Jonny Tata	7 – 0	Mark Cleaver (79.43)	
9	Saturday 23 August	Howick Club, Auckland	(94.79) Ben Robb	7 – 3	Haupai Puha (86.13)	
10	Sunday 24 August	Howick Club, Auckland	(99.49) Jonny Tata	7 – 5	Haupai Puha (92.55)	
11	Saturday 27 September	CSDA, Christchurch	(87.97) Jonny Tata	7 – 5	(New Zealand) Jamie Hamill (77.98)	
12	Sunday 28 September	CSDA, Christchurch	(95.03) Jonny Tata	7 – 4	Ben Robb (91.61)	

==== Australian Darts Association (ADA) Tour ====
The Australian Darts Association (ADA) Tour is the newly-established PDC Global Affiliate Tour for players from Oceania. The 2025 calendar consisted of 12 events organised over three weekends.

No.	Date	Location	Winner	Legs	Runner-up	Ref.
1	27–29 June	Sandgate, Queensland	Raymond Smith (95.95)	6 – 2	Tim Pusey (87.49)	
2	27–29 June	Sandgate, Queensland	Raymond Smith (89.45)	6 – 3	Tim Pusey (86.32)	
3	27–29 June	Sandgate, Queensland	Raymond Smith (87.51)	6 – 5	Ben Robb (90.10)	
4	27–29 June	Sandgate, Queensland	Raymond Smith (95.08)	6 – 2	Tim Pusey (80.90)	
5	1–3 August	Elizabeth North	Brody Klinge (98.36)	6 – 5	Ben Robb (96.12)	
6	1–3 August	Elizabeth North	Brody Klinge (93.47)	6 – 3	Robbie King (90.57)	
7	1–3 August	Elizabeth North	Tim Pusey (82.40)	6 – 4	Robbie King (77.47)	
8	1–3 August	Elizabeth North	Robbie King (87.48)	6 – 1	Harley Kemp (72.08)	
9	5–7 September	Melton, Victoria	Ben Robb (87.88)	6 – 3	Tim Pusey (89.91)	
10	5–7 September	Melton, Victoria	Tim Pusey (92.49)	6 – 5	Raymond Smith (88.55)	
11	5–7 September	Melton, Victoria	Tim Pusey (82.83)	6 – 4	James Bailey (76.37)	
12	5–7 September	Melton, Victoria	Brody Klinge (94.60)	6 – 5	Raymond Smith (96.06)	

=== Nordic & Baltic Tour ===
The PDC Nordic & Baltic (PDCNB) Tour is the PDC Global Affiliate Tour for players from Denmark, Estonia, Finland, Iceland, Latvia, Lithuania, Norway, and Sweden. On 30 August 2024, the 2025 calendar was announced, originally consisting of five weekends in five different countries. On 8 October 2024, a sixth weekend in Norway with four events was added. On 23 January 2025, the weekend in Iceland was moved from September to April due to a scheduling conflict with the European Tour.

2025 PDCNB Tour Order of Merit
Rank	Player	Earnings
1	Andreas Harrysson	€6,800
2	Teemu Harju (Note: The tie between Teemu Harju and Oskar Lukasiak was broken based on whoever achieved the better result in the last tournament.)	€4,475
3	Oskar Lukasiak	€4,475
4	Marko Kantele	€3,375
5	Valters Melderis	€3,050
6	Johan Engström	€3,025
7	Darius Labanauskas	€2,925
8	Daniel Larsson	€2,575
9	Jonas Masalin	€2,325
10	Cor Dekker	€1,375
Qualified for the 2026 PDC World Championship

No.	Date	Venue	Winner	Legs	Runner-up	Ref.
1	Saturday 15 February	Bellevue Park Hotel, Riga, Latvia	Oskar Lukasiak (89.32)	6 – 5	Andreas Harrysson (88.01)	
2	Sunday 16 February	Bellevue Park Hotel, Riga, Latvia	Jonas Masalin (98.28)	6 – 5	Teemu Harju (93.19)	
3	Saturday 29 March	Apple Hotel, Gothenburg, Sweden	Valters Melderis (94.94)	6 – 4	Johan Engström (91.83)	
4	Sunday 30 March	Apple Hotel, Gothenburg, Sweden	Marko Kantele (81.21)	6 – 2	Valters Melderis (79.33)	
5	Saturday 12 April	Bullseye, Reykjavík, Iceland	Andreas Harrysson (94.84)	6 – 5	Marko Kantele (98.93)	
6	Sunday 13 April	Bullseye, Reykjavík, Iceland	Andreas Harrysson (86.03)	6 – 2	Oskar Lukasiak (81.53)	
7	Saturday 10 May	Hotelli Tallukka, Vääksy, Finland	Teemu Harju (93.97)	6 – 2	Daniel Larsson (90.76)	
8	Sunday 11 May	Hotelli Tallukka, Vääksy, Finland	Darius Labanauskas (97.57)	6 – 3	Andreas Harrysson (92.01)	
9	Saturday 5 July	Slangerup Dartklub, Slangerup, Denmark	Daniel Larsson (93.42)	6 – 5	Edwin Torbjörnsson (87.07)	
10	Sunday 6 July	Slangerup Dartklub, Slangerup, Denmark	Andreas Harrysson (85.28)	6 – 5	Oskar Lukasiak (78.65)	
11	Saturday 2 August	Olavsgaard Hotel, Oslo, Norway	Andreas Harrysson (95.76)	6 – 4	Oskar Lukasiak (86.13)	
12	Sunday 3 August	Olavsgaard Hotel, Oslo, Norway	Teemu Harju (80.52)	6 – 2	Johan Engström (79.80)	

==== Nordic & Baltic Darts Championship ====
The newly-established PDC Nordic & Baltic Darts Championship was held on 3 and 4 October and featured the top 24 players on the PDCNB Tour Order of Merit.

First round (best of 11 legs); 3 October
16	Ivan Springborg 76.14	1
17	Viktor Tingström 85.53	6
9	Jonas Masalin 81.22	6
24	Edgar Znutins 74.06	4
13	Kent Jøran Sivertsen 81.06	3
20	Anton Östlund 83.30	6
12	Edwin Torbjörnsson 77.45	6
21	Niels Heinsøe 72.36	5
15	Pär Riihonen 75.92	6
18	Michael Mogensen 74.02	5
10	Cor Dekker 79.76	6
23	Jani Keskinarkaus 76.08	3
14	Mindaugas Barauskas 71.71	6
19	Mattias Jönsson 72.15	5
11	Andreas Hyllgaardhus 81.60	6
22	Andreas Toft Jørgensen 78.84	4

Second round (best of 11 legs); 4 October
1	Andreas Harrysson 99.11	6
17	Viktor Tingström 91.44	3
8	Daniel Larsson 90.86	6
9	Jonas Masalin 83.93	2
4	Marko Kantele 70.82	2
20	Anton Östlund 76.62	6
5	Valters Melderis 87.21	5
12	Edwin Torbjörnsson 88.17	6
2	Teemu Harju 74.76	6
15	Pär Riihonen 65.45	1
7	Darius Labanauskas 88.75	5
10	Cor Dekker 94.15	6
3	Oskar Lukasiak 80.81	2
14	Mindaugas Barauskas 81.00	6
6	Johan Engström 99.10	6
11	Andreas Hyllgaardhus 81.03	0

Quarter-finals (best of 11 legs); 4 October
1	Andreas Harrysson 98.68	4
8	Daniel Larsson 103.36	6
20	Anton Östlund 88.96	5
12	Edwin Torbjörnsson 91.00	6
2	Teemu Harju 88.40	6
10	Cor Dekker 81.43	4
14	Mindaugas Barauskas 78.90	5
6	Johan Engström 81.34	6

Semi-finals (best of 13 legs); 4 October
8	Daniel Larsson 82.38	6
12	Edwin Torbjörnsson 78.50	7
2	Teemu Harju 88.71	7
6	Johan Engström 91.44	6

Final (best of 15 legs); 4 October
12	Edwin Torbjörnsson 88.08	2
2	Teemu Harju 94.36	8

=== Next Gen ===
The PDC Europe Next Gen is the PDC Global Affiliate Tour for players from Germany, Switzerland, Austria, Luxembourg and Liechtenstein. The 2025 calendar consisted of 15 events organised over seven weekends. Players over 16 years of age who did not hold a PDC Tour Card were eligible to compete.

No.	Date	Location	Format	Winner	Legs	Runner-up	Ref.
1	1–2 February	Hildesheim	DIDO	Kevin Troppmann (79.73)	5 – 3	Rowby-John Rodriguez (59.73)	
2	1–2 February	Hildesheim	FA Cup	Michael Klönhammer (85.99)	6 – 1	Jarod Becker (76.71)	
3	1–2 March	Kalkar	Master Out	Kevin Kuhn (82.39)	6 – 4	Oliver Mueller (88.43)	
4	1–2 March	Kalkar	Seeding	Dragutin Horvat (88.12)	6 – 2	Paul Krohne (85.35)	
5	20–22 June	Rust	DIDO	Oliver Mueller (73.81)	5 – 2	(Germany) Kimi Seemann (61.81)	
6	20–22 June	Rust	Master Out	Oliver Mueller (92.97)	6 – 0	Daniel Klose (73.29)	
7	20–22 June	Rust	FA Cup	Daniel Klose (95.64)	6 – 1	(Germany) Andrej Batz (83.33)	
8	2–3 August	Sindelfingen	DIDO	Michael Klönhammer (84.40)	5 – 3	Matthias Ehlers (74.08)	
9	2–3 August	Sindelfingen	Seeding	Daniel Klose (80.66)	6 – 3	Yorick Hofkens (83.20)	
10	9–10 August	Sindelfingen	Master Out	Daniel Klose (92.87)	6 – 1	Jannis Barkhausen (83.81)	
11	9–10 August	Sindelfingen	FA Cup	Patrick Klingelhöfer (84.48)	6 – 5	Paul Krohne (91.47)	
12	23–24 August	Kalkar	DIDO	Paul Krohne (85.53)	5 – 4	Franz Rötzsch (88.32)	
13	23–24 August	Kalkar	Seeding	Paul Krohne (97.91)	6 – 3	(Germany) Tim Scholz (88.14)	
14	13–14 September	Hildesheim	Master Out	Arno Merk (84.51)	6 – 3	Liam Maendl-Lawrance (81.97)	
15	13–14 September	Hildesheim	FA Cup	Arno Merk (89.61)	6 – 3	(Germany) Sebastian Steinmetz (79.35)	

DIDO = Double in/double out, FA Cup = Random draw every round, Master Out = Finish on a double or treble, Seeding = Top-ranked players are seeded

==== Super League ====
The PDC Europe Super League (known for sponsorship reasons as the HYLO PDC Europe Super League) was held from 4 to 7 November and featured 24 players from the Next Gen tour – the top 20 players on the main Next Gen Order of Merit and the top four players on the youth Order of Merit. Although players from Switzerland, Austria, Luxembourg and Liechtenstein were eligible to qualify, all 24 players were from Germany. The qualifiers were split into four groups of six, with the top four players in each group progressing to the knockout stage. The knockout stage results are shown below.

Second round (best of 11 legs); 6 Oct
Daniel Klose 80.66	6
Tim Scholz 74.64	3
Mika Donnevert 90.22	6
Patrick Klingelhöfer 81.91	4
Oliver Mueller 82.58	4
Michael Klönhammer 85.64	6
Liam Maendl-Lawrance 102.26	6
Paul Krohne 97.93	5
Franz Rötzsch 81.52	4
Jarod Becker 86.45	6
Dragutin Horvat 77.42	6
Kimi Seemann 70.71	2
Yorick Hofkens 86.82	6
Andree Welge 81.24	4
Arno Merk 94.85	6
Kevin Troppmann 80.16	2

Quarter-finals (best of 11 legs); 7 Oct
Daniel Klose 84.65	6
Mika Donnevert 77.73	1
Michael Klönhammer 76.37	2
Liam Maendl-Lawrance 96.20	6
Jarod Becker 82.71	6
Dragutin Horvat 85.09	5
Yorick Hofkens 93.13	4
Arno Merk 99.66	6

Semi-finals (best of 13 legs); 7 Oct
Daniel Klose 88.01	7
Liam Maendl-Lawrance 88.16	3
Jarod Becker 73.82	2
Arno Merk 87.14	7

Final (best of 15 legs); 7 Oct
Daniel Klose 87.40	6
Arno Merk 86.13	8

=== China Pro Tour ===
The China Pro Tour is the PDC Global Affiliate Tour for players from China. The 2025 calendar consisted of ten events held from May to October.

No.	Date	Winner	Legs	Runner-up	Ref.
1	Saturday 24 May	Yuanjun Liu (84.67)	5 – 1	(China) Kehua Wang (77.30)	
2	Saturday 24 May	Xiaochen Zong (84.76)	5 – 2	Qingyu Zhan (79.37)	
3	Sunday 25 May	Tong Xu (72.27)	5 – 4	Qingyu Zhan (69.72)	
4	Saturday 19 July	Qingyu Zhan (74.70)	5 – 4	Yuanjun Liu (75.42)	
5	Saturday 19 July	Xiaochen Zong (85.65)	5 – 1	Bin Zheng (81.12)	
6	Sunday 20 July	Yuanjun Liu (88.73)	5 – 1	(China) Junyu Wang (75.21)	
7	Friday 22 August	Bin Zheng (78.92)	5 – 4	Yuanjun Liu (87.16)	
8	Friday 22 August	Qingyu Zhan (81.30)	5 – 4	Xicheng Han (76.16)	
9	Saturday 23 August	Lihao Wen (76.52)	5 – 4	(China) Ruilin Zhu (67.82)	
10	Saturday 23 August	Qingyu Zhan (82.66)	5 – 3	Yuanjun Liu (82.47)	

==== China Premier League ====
The China Premier League featured eight players: the top six players from the China Online Tour Order of Merit and two qualifiers. Seven events were held from 18 to 20 April 2025, followed by the play-offs which determined the champion.

The finalists of the China Premier League play-offs represented China at the 2025 PDC World Cup of Darts.

No.	Date	Winner	Legs	Runner-up	Ref.
1	18–20 April	Qingyu Zhan (83.92)	5 – 4	Lihao Wen (81.52)	
2	18–20 April	Xiaochen Zong (93.85)	5 – 3	Qingyu Zhan (89.56)	
3	18–20 April	Lihao Wen (85.40)	5 – 0	Qingyu Zhan (76.14)	
4	18–20 April	Bin Zheng (77.93)	5 – 2	Lihao Wen (77.06)	
5	18–20 April	Qingyu Zhan (93.27)	5 – 3	Xiaochen Zong (90.43)	
6	18–20 April	Qingyu Zhan (86.58)	5 – 2	Bin Zheng (79.12)	
7	18–20 April	Bin Zheng (77.80)	5 – 4	Xiaochen Zong (79.41)	

Play-offs

Semi-finals (best of 19 legs)
Qingyu Zhan 80.52	7
Xiaochen Zong 91.55	10
Bin Zheng 74.47	6
Lihao Wen 77.25	10

Final (best of 21 legs)
Xiaochen Zong 90.18	11
Lihao Wen 80.52	10

==== China Championship ====
The China Championship featured 24 players: the top 16 players on the China Pro Tour Order of Merit and 8 qualifiers from online Chinese events. It took place on 24 August and consisted of a group stage (eight groups of three) and a knockout stage. The results of the knockout stage are shown below.

Quarter-finals (best of 3 sets)
Qingyu Zhan 79.53	2
(China) Kehua Wang 68.52	0
Bin Zheng 86.16	2
Tong Xu 72.62	0
(China) Jizhou Li 69.07	0
Xicheng Han 75.92	2
Xiaochen Zong 83.83	2
(China) Jiepeng Xuan 71.85	0

Semi-finals (best of 3 sets)
Qingyu Zhan 85.89	2
Bin Zheng 75.18	0
Xicheng Han 74.50	0
Xiaochen Zong 79.58	2

Final (best of 5 sets)
Qingyu Zhan 79.47	1
Xiaochen Zong 82.04	3

=== Championship Darts Latin America and Caribbean (CDLC) Tour ===
The Championship Darts Latin America and Caribbean (CDLC) Tour is the PDC Global Affiliate Tour for players from Latin America and the Caribbean. The 2025 calendar consisted of six events organised over three weekends in Panama, the Bahamas and Chile – an expansion from four events in 2024.

No.	Date	Location	Winner	Legs	Runner-up	Ref.
1	Saturday 26 April	Panama City, Panama	Jesús Sálate (71.84)	6 – 5	Sudesh Fitzgerald (72.47)	
2	Sunday 27 April	Panama City, Panama	Rashad Sweeting (81.98)	6 – 0	Jonathon Heron (55.17)	
3	Saturday 26 July	Grand Bahama, The Bahamas	Jesús Sálate (77.96)	6 – 1	Norman Madhoo (73.82)	
4	Sunday 27 July	Grand Bahama, The Bahamas	Rashad Sweeting (86.08)	6 – 3	Norman Madhoo (82.11)	
5	Saturday 4 October	Santiago, Chile	Jesús Sálate (90.18)	6 – 0	Norman Madhoo (75.03)	
6	Sunday 5 October	Santiago, Chile	Jesús Sálate (88.41)	6 – 0	Norman Madhoo (69.09)	

=== African Continental Tour ===
The African Continental Tour is the PDC Global Affiliate Tour for players from Africa. The tour was split into two regions: South and North.

2025 Southern Africa
No.	Date	Location	Winner	Legs	Runner-up	Ref.
1	Saturday 8 February	Gqeberha, South Africa	Stefan Vermaak (75.45)	8 – 6	Devon Petersen (76.42)	
2	Saturday 5 April	Kimberley, Northern Cape, South Africa	Simon Adams (71.65)	8 – 6	(South Africa) Dean Naude (70.90)	
3	Saturday 21 June	Walvis Bay, Namibia	Graham Filby (77.13)	8 – 5	Cameron Carolissen (74.57)	
4	Sunday 30 August	Gaborone, Botswana	Cameron Carolissen (84.68)	8 – 0	Graham Filby (73.93)	

2025 Northern & Eastern Africa
No.	Date	Location	Winner	Legs	Runner-up	Ref.
1	Sunday 27 April	Nairobi, Kenya	Patrick Ocheng (84.93)	8 – 5	(Kenya) Felix Kirwa (79.37)	
2	Sunday 1 June	Nakuru, Kenya	Patrick Ocheng (80.09)	8 – 5	Peter Wachiuri (75.78)	
3	Sunday 27 July	Nairobi, Kenya	Peter Wachiuri (82.31)	8 – 7	(Kenya) Ndungu Nephat Muhinja (79.36)	

=== Japan Tour ===
The Japan Tour, also known as the Steel Darts Japan Tour, is the PDC Global Affiliate Tour for players from Japan. The 2025 calendar consisted of twelve events organised over three weekends, followed by the Japan Tour Finals. The top 32 players on the Japan Tour Order of Merit after event 12 competed in the Japan Tour Finals in Tokyo on 16 November.

No.	Date	Venue	Winner	Score	Runner-up	Ref.
1	16–17 August	Twin Messe, Shizuoka	Seigo Asada (92.48)	4 – 1	Motomu Sakai (88.52)	
2	16–17 August	Twin Messe, Shizuoka	Sho Okano (91.52)	4 – 1	Taiyo Nishimata (82.62)	
3	16–17 August	Twin Messe, Shizuoka	Sho Okano (103.13)	4 – 1	Seigo Asada (97.74)	
4	16–17 August	Twin Messe, Shizuoka	Sho Okano (84.89)	4 – 1	Takayuki Masatsu (79.30)	
5	27–28 September	Twin Messe, Shizuoka	Ryuta Arihara (107.36)	4 – 0	(Japan) Yuya Fukuchi (102.12)	
6	27–28 September	Twin Messe, Shizuoka	Keita Ono (90.11)	4 – 3	Ryuta Arihara (91.89)	
7	27–28 September	Twin Messe, Shizuoka	Mitsuhiko Tatsunami (94.36)	4 – 1	(Japan) Osamu Inaba (77.77)	
8	27–28 September	Twin Messe, Shizuoka	Mitsuhiko Tatsunami (71.75)	4 – 3	Toyokazu Shibata (78.22)	
9	18–19 October	Kobe Port Terminal Hall, Kobe	Seigo Asada (88.58)	4 – 3	(Japan) Shunpei Kuroda (82.69)	
10	18–19 October	Kobe Port Terminal Hall, Kobe	Seigo Asada (93.03)	4 – 3	Yoshihisa Baba (88.37)	
11	18–19 October	Kobe Port Terminal Hall, Kobe	Tomoya Goto (93.94)	4 – 0	Tomoya Tsumura (76.75)	
12	18–19 October	Kobe Port Terminal Hall, Kobe	Yuya Fukuchi (89.26)	4 – 3	Seigo Asada (92.46)	
Finals	16 November	Tunnel Tokyo, Osaki, Tokyo	Mitsuhiko Tatsunami (88.38)	2 – 1	Ryuta Arihara (96.24)	

==== Japan Tour Finals ====
The results from the last 16 onwards are shown below.

Second round (best of 9 legs)
Sho Okano 74.27	2
Yoshihisa Baba 78.52	5
Ryuta Arihara 84.44	5
Taku Fujikawa 74.24	0
Keita Ono 85.79	5
Yuya Akutsu 80.29	3
Takayuki Masatsu 79.68	5
Yuya Fukuchi 76.66	3
Seigo Asada 89.52	5
Toyokazu Shibata 86.75	1
Hiroki Kaneko 87.38	5
Hiroki Doi 79.07	0
Mitsuhiko Tatsunami 82.58	5
Akito Yamagata 76.61	0
Joji Kanuma 83.83	5
Yasuyoshi Matsumoto 72.09	1

Quarter-finals (best of 9 legs)
Yoshihisa Baba 84.20	1
Ryuta Arihara 93.32	5
Keita Ono 80.64	5
Takayuki Masatsu 73.94	1
Seigo Asada 84.47	2
Hiroki Kaneko 92.12	5
Mitsuhiko Tatsunami 89.17	5
Joji Kanuma 90.16	4

Semi-finals (best of 3 sets)
Ryuta Arihara 96.44	2
Keita Ono 97.96	1
Hiroki Kaneko 79.47	1
Mitsuhiko Tatsunami 85.60	2

Final (best of 3 sets)
Ryuta Arihara 96.24	1
Mitsuhiko Tatsunami 88.38	2
