= Philippine Open =

Philippine Open may refer to several sporting events.

- Philippine Open (golf)
- Philippines Open (badminton)
- Philippines Open (darts)
- Philippine Open (tennis)
- Philippines Open (pool)
