= Tim Pusey =

Australian darts player (born 1992)

Personal information
- Nickname: "Thunder from Down Under"
- Born: 26 August 1992 (age 34) Perth, Australia

Sport
- Sport: Darts
- Playing since: 2004
- Darts: 22g Red Dragon
- Laterality: Right-handed
- Walk-on music: "My House" by Flo Rida

Organisation (see split in darts)
- PDC: 2015–
- WDF: 2017–

PDC premier events – best performances
- World Championship: Last 128: 2026

Other tournament wins
- Years
West Coast Classic	2021
ADA Tour	2025 (x3)
DPA Pro Tour	2018, 2019, 2022 (x2), 2024, 2025 (x2)

Tim Pusey (born 26 August 1992) is an Australian darts player who competes in Professional Darts Corporation (PDC) and World Darts Federation (WDF) events.

== Career ==
Pusey's first PDC affiliate event was 2015 DPA Harrows Australian Grand Prix 3, making the quarter-finals.

Pusey has won eleven titles in his career. He has won one WDF event at 2021 West Coast Classic and 10 PDC affiliate tour titles, seven DPA titles and three ADA titles.

In 2025, he finished top of the order of merit in the Australia Darts Association (ADA) tour after winning back-to-back titles on the final weekend. As he resulted he qualified for the ANZ Premier League and 2026 PDC World Darts Championship. On night six, he defeated both Ben Robb and Simon Whitlock 5–3 and Jonny Tata 5-2 in the final to win the night in Wellington. He qualified for Finals Night in Brisbane after finishing fourth but lost his semi-final 8–2 to Raymond Smith.

Ahead of 2026 World Championship, Pusey announced the PDC had banned him from using his nickname 'The Magnet' due to it creating a vulgar innuendo when paired with his surname. Playing under his new nickname, 'Thunder from Down Under', Pusey lost to Keane Barry 3–0 on his World Championship debut.

== World Championship results ==
=== PDC World Championship ===
- 2026: First Round (lost to Keane Barry 3–0)

== Performance timeline ==
=== PDC ===
Tournament	2026
PDC Ranked televised events
World Championship	1R

==== Australian Darts Association Tour ====
Season	1	2	3	4	5	6	7	8	9	10	11	12
2025	SAN; F	SAN; F	SAN; QF	SAN; F	LIZ; SF	LIZ; QF	LIZ; W	LIZ; SF	MLT; F	MLT; W	MLT; W	MLT; QF

Performance Table Legend
W	Won the tournament	F	Finalist	SF	Semifinalist	QF	Quarterfinalist	#R; RR; L#	Lost in # round Round-robin; Last # stage	DQ	Disqualified
DNQ	Did not qualify	DNP	Did not participate	WD	Withdrew	NH	Tournament not held	#R; RR; L#	Lost in # round Round-robin; Last # stage	NYF	Not yet founded
