= Xiaochen Zong =

Chinese darts player (born 1998)

Personal information
- Nickname: "The Pandaman"
- Born: 8 March 1998 (age 28) Dandong, Liaoning Province, China

Sport
- Sport: Darts
- Playing since: 2012
- Darts: 23g Caliburn Signature
- Laterality: Right-handed
- Walk-on music: "Lucky Strike" by Maroon 5

Organisation (see split in darts)
- PDC: 2016–present

PDC premier events – best performances
- World Championship: Last 72: 2018

Other tournament wins
- Years
PDC Asian Tour	2023 (×2)
PDC China Championship	2024, 2025
PDC China Premier League	2022, 2023, 2024, 2025
PDC China Pro Tour	2025 (×2), 2026 (×8)

Xiaochen Zong (Chinese: 宗笑尘; born 8 March 1998) is a Chinese professional darts player who competes in Professional Darts Corporation (PDC) events. He has won two titles on the PDC Asian Tour. He has also won both the China Premier League and China Championship on multiple occasions. Zong has represented China five times at both the PDC World Darts Championship and the PDC World Cup of Darts.

== Career ==
Zong played in the 2017 Shanghai Darts Masters, where he lost 0–6 to James Wade, and later in the year, he won the Chinese Qualifier competition to qualify for the 2018 PDC World Darts Championship. He played against Bernie Smith of New Zealand in the preliminary round, but even though he lost by 0–2 in sets, he set a new national record average of 86.97 in the match.

In the middle of the year, he represented his country with Momo Zhou at the 2018 PDC World Cup of Darts. After a close match, albeit at a low level, China fell in the first round match against Switzerland (Alex Fehlmann and Andy Bless) 2–5 in legs. Later that year, he played in the 2018 Shanghai Darts Masters, where he lost 0–6 to Michael Smith. In November, he competed again in the Chinese Qualifier for the 2019 PDC World Darts Championship, but lost in the qualifying final 2–5 in legs to lower-seeded Yuanjun Liu. Two weeks later, he appeared in his 2018 PDC World Youth Championship, where he was eliminated in the group-stage by Rhys Griffin. Throughout the season, he took part in individual PDC Asian Tour and PDC Development Tour tournaments, but without big success.

In 2019, once again had the opportunity to represent China at the 2019 PDC World Cup of Darts. This time his partner was Yuanjun Liu. The Chinese team was knocked out again in the first round, this time losing to the United States team (Darin Young and Chuck Puleo) 1–5 in legs. In October, he took part in next Chinese qualifying tournament for the 2020 PDC World Darts Championship. In November, he played in the PDC Development Tour competitions and 2019 PDC World Youth Championship, where he was eliminated in the group-stage by Luke Humphries. His rival in the first round of the 2020 PDC World Darts Championship was Kyle Anderson, with whom he lost 2–3 in sets.

The COVID-19 pandemic significantly slowed down his career, but he devoted this time to developing his skills. In 2022, was one of the players invited to participate in the PDC China Premier League. He won seven of nine regular matchdays, being unbeaten for 21 matches, finishes the regular phase as leader and he eventually beat all rivals in the final play-offs. Zong beat Zheng Bin 5–0 in the final of the ninth matchday with an impressive average of 101.55, which is new national record average. Despite winning the tournament, Zong did not travel to the 2023 PDC World Darts Championship as he could not be vaccinated against COVID-19 due to allergies, meaning he was unable to compete outside China.

== World Championship results ==
=== PDC ===
- 2018: Preliminary round (lost to Bernie Smith 0–2) (sets)
- 2020: First round (lost to Kyle Anderson 2–3)
- 2024: First round (lost to Mickey Mansell 0–3)
- 2025: First round (lost to Ricardo Pietreczko 0–3)
- 2026: First round (lost to Chris Dobey 1–3)

== Performance timeline ==
Tournament	2016	2018	2019	2020	2023	2024	2025	2026
PDC Ranked televised events
World Championship	DNQ	Prel.	DNQ	1R	WD	1R	1R	1R
PDC Non-ranked televised events
World Cup	DNP	1R	1R	DNP	RR	RR	RR	RR
World Youth Championship	2R	RR	RR	DNP				
PDC Other events
Asian Championship	Not held				DNP		2R	
China Championship	Not held					W	W	

Performance Table Legend
W	Won the tournament	F	Finalist	SF	Semifinalist	QF	Quarterfinalist	#R; RR; Prel.	Lost in # round Round-robin; Preliminary round	DQ	Disqualified
DNQ	Did not qualify	DNP	Did not participate	WD	Withdrew	NH	Tournament not held	#R; RR; Prel.	Lost in # round Round-robin; Preliminary round	NYF	Not yet founded
