= 2025 PDC World Cup of Darts =

Tournament information
- Dates: 12–15 June 2025
- Venue: Eissporthalle
- Location: Frankfurt, Germany
- Organisation(s): Professional Darts Corporation (PDC)
- Format: Legs
- Prize fund: £450,000
- Winner's share: £80,000
- High checkout: 150; Jeffrey de Graaf (SWE)

Champion(s)
- Northern Ireland (Josh Rock and Daryl Gurney)

Nations starting in the second round Nations starting in the group stage Former participants

The 2025 PDC World Cup of Darts (known for sponsorship reasons as the 2025 BetVictor World Cup of Darts) was a professional darts tournament, held from 12 to 15 June 2025 at the Eissporthalle in Frankfurt, Germany. It was the fifteenth edition of the PDC World Cup of Darts to be staged by the Professional Darts Corporation. The tournament featured 40 national teams; the top four nations based on lowest combined PDC Order of Merit ranking entered in the second round, while the remaining 36 teams started in the group stage. The total prize fund was £450,000, with the winning team receiving £80,000.

2013 finalists Belgium were eliminated in the group stage, marking the nation's earliest exit at the tournament. Argentina were the only nation to make their first appearance, qualifying from their group on debut.

England, represented by Luke Humphries and Luke Littler, were the defending champions after Humphries and Michael Smith defeated Austria 10–6 in the 2024 final. However, they lost to Germany 8–4 in the second round.

Northern Ireland, represented by Josh Rock and Daryl Gurney, won their first ever World Cup title by defeating Wales 10–9 in the final.

== Overview ==
=== Background ===
The 2025 PDC World Cup of Darts was the fifteenth edition of the tournament to be staged by the Professional Darts Corporation since the first edition in 2010. It was introduced as part of PDC chairman Barry Hearn's plans to expand professional darts, which he initiated after his offer to acquire the British Darts Organisation was rejected. The first edition was held at the Rainton Meadows Arena in Houghton-le-Spring, England, and was won by the Netherlands (Raymond van Barneveld and Co Stompé). The tournament has since been exclusively held in Germany, with the exception of 2020 which was held in Austria.

The 2025 edition was held from 12 to 15 June 2025 at the Eissporthalle in Frankfurt for the fourth consecutive year. Gibraltar-based online gambling company BetVictor continued its sponsorship of the event after becoming title sponsor the previous year.

England were the defending champions after Luke Humphries and Michael Smith defeated the Austrian pair of Mensur Suljović and Rowby-John Rodriguez 10–6 in the 2024 final, marking England's first triumph since 2016. For the 2025 edition, Humphries teamed with reigning world champion and World Cup debutant Luke Littler. Tournament sponsor BetVictor unveiled England as pre-tournament favourites at odds of 4/11.

=== Format ===
The 40-team format remained. The top four seeded teams received a bye to the second round, while the other 36 competed in a group stage of twelve groups of three, with one qualifying from each group.

In this format, all rounds are a single match played in doubles format:

- Group stage: Best of seven legs
- Second round, quarter and semi-finals: Best of fifteen legs
- Final: Best of nineteen legs

=== Prize money ===
The total prize money remained at £450,000.

The prize money per team was:

Position (no. of teams)		Prize money (Total: £450,000)
Winners	(1)	£80,000
Runners-up	(1)	£50,000
Semi-finalists	(2)	£30,000
Quarter-finalists	(4)	£20,000
Last 16 (Second round)	(8)	£9,000
Second in group	(12)	£5,000
Third in group	(12)	£4,000

=== Broadcasts ===
The tournament was broadcast on Sky Sports in the United Kingdom and Ireland. Other broadcasters include DAZN in Germany, Austria and Switzerland; FanDuel in the United States and Canada; Fox Sports in Australia; Sky Sport in New Zealand; Viaplay in the Netherlands, Iceland, Poland, the Baltic states and Scandinavia; VTM in Belgium; L'Équipe in France; TV Nova in the Czech Republic and Slovakia; Sport TV in Hungary; Arena Sport in the Balkans and Mediapro in Spain. It was also available on PDCTV to international subscribers.

== Teams and seedings ==
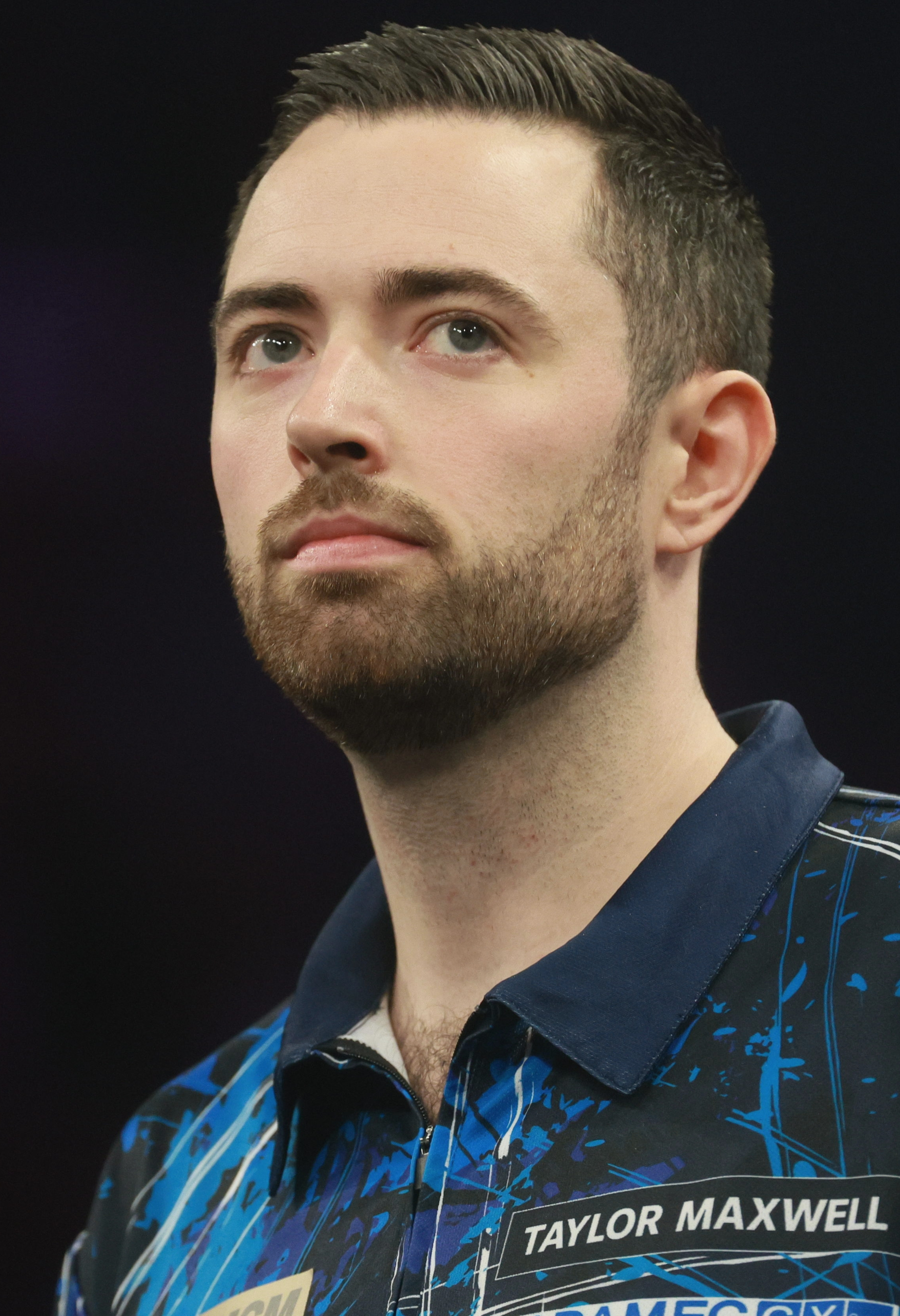
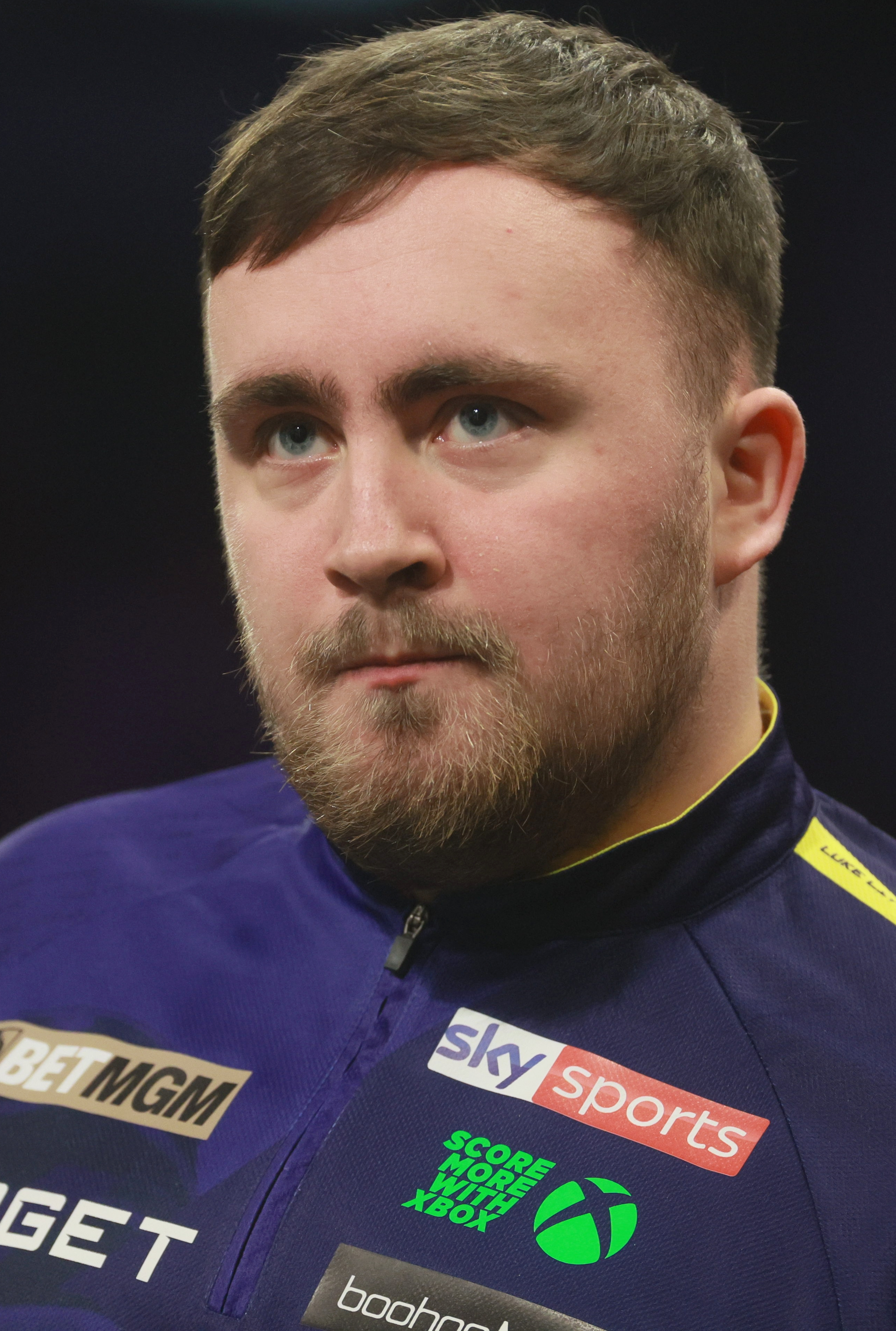
England, represented by Luke Humphries and Luke Littler, entered the tournament as defending champions.

The tournament consisted of 40 teams. The first 34 nations taking part in the tournament were confirmed on 4 March with six more nations to be determined: three from a PDC Asia Qualifier, two from the PDC Nordic & Baltic Tour and one from a Championship Darts Latin & Caribbean Qualifier.

The Championship Darts Latin & Caribbean Qualifier was won by Argentina, who made their debut, with Guyana missing out after two consecutive appearances. After failing to qualify in 2024, India was awarded a wild card alongside Bahrain, China, Japan, Hong Kong and the Philippines. The PDC Asia Qualifier was won by Singapore, Malaysia and Chinese Taipei, the same three nations as in 2024. Lithuania and Finland then completed the lineup, becoming the two PDC Nordic & Baltic qualifiers as the countries with the highest ranked players on the PDC Nordic & Baltic Tour.

The top four nations based on lowest combined PDC Order of Merit rankings were seeded in the second round, while the next twelve nations were seeded in the group stage. The top two players from nations represented by the PDC Order of Merit were confirmed on 13 May.

Seeded nations (Top 4 into second round)

Rank	Country	Entered players	Start in
1	England	Luke Humphries and Luke Littler	Round 2
2	Wales	Jonny Clayton and Gerwyn Price	Round 2
3	Scotland	Gary Anderson and Peter Wright	Round 2
4	Northern Ireland	Josh Rock and Daryl Gurney	Round 2
5	Netherlands	Danny Noppert and Gian van Veen	Round 1
6	Belgium	Mike De Decker and Dimitri Van den Bergh	Round 1
7	Germany	Martin Schindler and Ricardo Pietreczko	Round 1
8	Ireland	William O'Connor and Keane Barry	Round 1
9	Poland	Krzysztof Ratajski and Radek Szagański	Round 1
10	Canada	Matt Campbell and Jim Long	Round 1
11	Sweden	Jeffrey de Graaf and Oskar Lukasiak	Round 1
12	Austria	Mensur Suljović and Rusty-Jake Rodriguez	Round 1
13	United States	Danny Lauby and Jules van Dongen	Round 1
14	Czech Republic	Karel Sedláček and Petr Křivka	Round 1
15	Croatia	Pero Ljubić and Boris Krčmar	Round 1
16	Finland	Teemu Harju and Marko Kantele	Round 1

Unseeded nations

Country	Entered players
Argentina	Jesús Salate and Víctor Guillín
Australia	Damon Heta and Simon Whitlock
Bahrain	Sadeq Mohamed and Hasan Bucheeri
China	Xiaochen Zong and Lihao Wen
Chinese Taipei	Teng Lieh Pupo and An-Sheng Lu
Denmark	Benjamin Drue Reus and Andreas Hyllgaardhus
France	Thibault Tricole and Jacques Labre
Gibraltar	Craig Galliano and Justin Hewitt
Hong Kong	Man Lok Leung and Lok Yin Lee
Hungary	György Jehirszki and Gergely Lakatos
India	Nitin Kumar and Mohan Goel
Italy	Michele Turetta and Massimo Dalla Rosa
Japan	Ryusei Azemoto and Tomoya Goto
Latvia	Madars Razma and Valters Melderis
Lithuania	Darius Labanauskas and Mindaugas Barauskas
Malaysia	Tengku Shah and Tan Jenn Ming
New Zealand	Haupai Puha and Mark Cleaver
Norway	Cor Dekker and Kent Jøran Sivertsen
Philippines	Lourence Ilagan and Paolo Nebrida
Portugal	José de Sousa and Bruno Nascimento
Singapore	Paul Lim and Phuay Wei Tan
South Africa	Cameron Carolissen and Devon Petersen
Spain	Daniel Zapata and Ricardo Fernández
Switzerland	Stefan Bellmont and Alex Fehlmann

== Summary ==
=== Groups ===
In each of the three group stage sessions, one match was played from each group. The loser of the first match played in the second match, while the winner of the first match played in the third match, ensuring there were no dead rubbers. In each session, the matches were played in the following group order: G, J, K, D, F, I, E, B, A, C, H, L. The first session of group stage matches took place on 12 June. The Netherlands, represented by Danny Noppert and debutant Gian van Veen, began their campaign with a 4–0 whitewash win over Italy. Host nation Germany won 4–2 against Portugal, while 2024 finalists Austria defeated Spain 4–1. North America ended the session without a win, as the United States and Canada were beaten by Hong Kong and Malaysia respectively. Japan's 4–3 win over Croatia was the third of a trio of Asian victories, with the pairing of Ryusei Azemoto and Tomoya Goto coming back from 3–1 down and surviving match darts to triumph in a deciding leg. Sweden, the Czech Republic, Ireland, Poland, Belgium and New Zealand were also victorious in their opening group stage matches.

In the second session of group stage matches (13 June), the Philippines, Singapore, Denmark, Australia and Argentina won their first matches, setting up winner-take-all matches for session three in their respective groups. Argentina's win was their first victory at the World Cup. As a result of their losses, Canada and Finland became the first seeds to be eliminated, losing both games alongside unseeded teams Latvia, Portugal and Spain. Lithuania and Norway were also eliminated by leg difference despite Lithuania winning a match and Norway still having to play Poland in the final session. Italy, Gibraltar, South Africa, the United States, Chinese Taipei and Croatia also won their first matches.

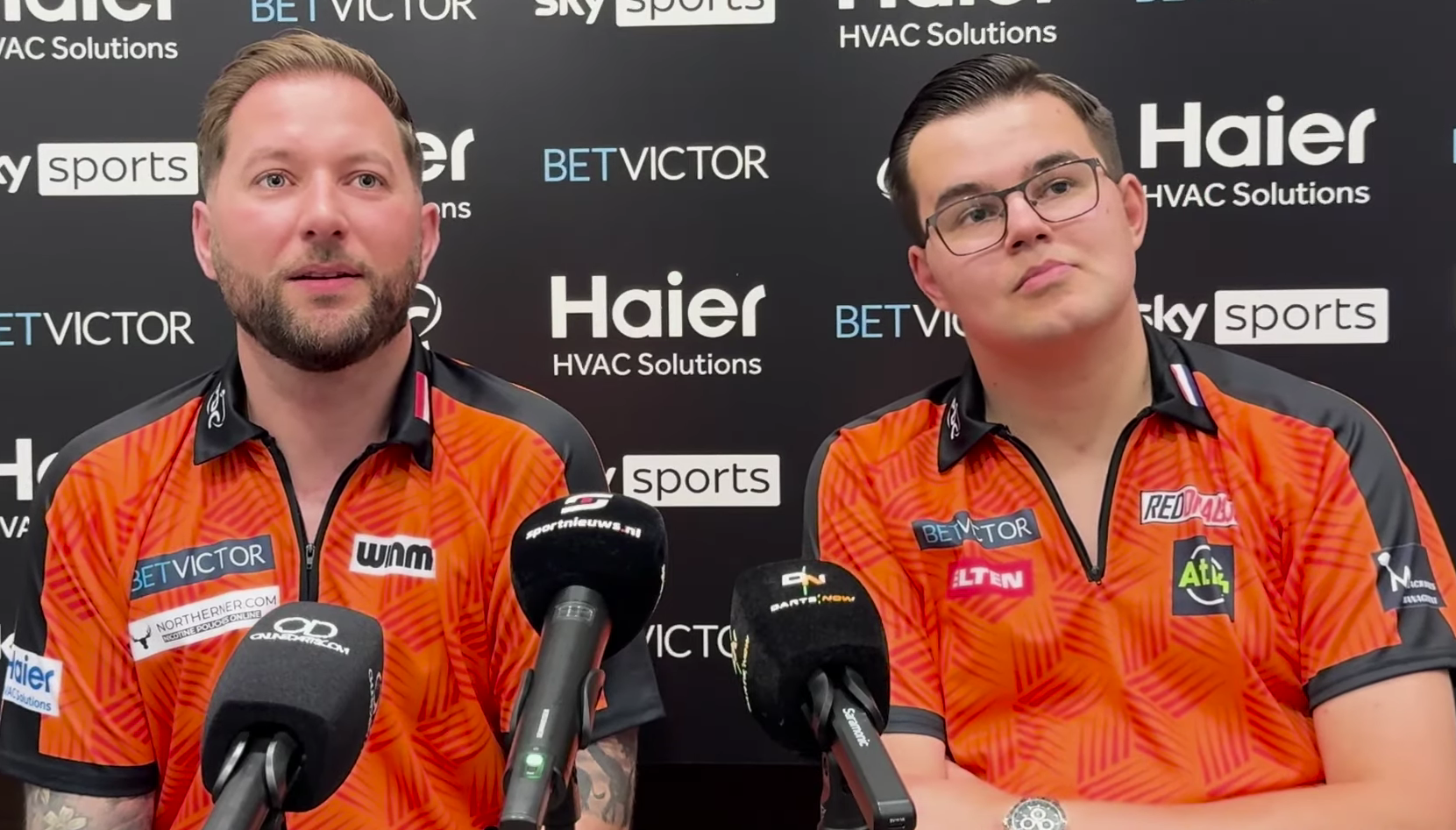
The Netherlands, represented by Danny Noppert and Gian van Veen, won Group A without losing a leg.

The final group stage session (13 June) saw five more seeds eliminated, with the Netherlands, Germany and the Czech Republic being the only seeds to qualify by winning both their games. The Netherlands won Group A without losing a leg as they won 4–0 against Hungary. Germany defeated Singapore (71-year-old Paul Lim and his partner Phuay Wei Tan) to top Group C; they were drawn to play tournament favourites England in the second round. The Czech Republic beat India 4–2 to seal their qualification. Sweden and Ireland were the only other seeds to qualify. After Gibraltar beat China 4–2 and China surprisingly beat Ireland by the same scoreline, Ireland progressed from Group D based on legs won against the throw. In Group G, France suffered a 4–3 loss to Lithuania but were 4–3 winners against Sweden, with Sweden advancing to the knockout stage based on leg difference. After winning their opening match 4–2 against Latvia earlier in the day, the Philippines qualified from Group B through a 4–3 upset victory over Belgium. The pairing of Lourence Ilagan and Paolo Nebrida came back from 3–0 down and survived seven missed match darts from Mike De Decker and Dimitri Van den Bergh. It marked the earliest exit for Belgium in the tournament's history. Ilagan commented, "It's not easy to play against two of the best players in the PDC, but we just tried to play our own game and we trusted each other." The 2024 finalists Austria were also eliminated, losing 4–1 to group winners and former champions Australia (Damon Heta and Simon Whitlock). Hong Kong and Switzerland won their matches to progress, while Norway's defeat of Poland allowed South Africa to qualify from Group E. Malaysia qualified for the second round for the first time, defeating Denmark, while Argentina – the edition's only debuting nation – beat New Zealand in the final match to qualify for the knockout stage.

=== Second round ===
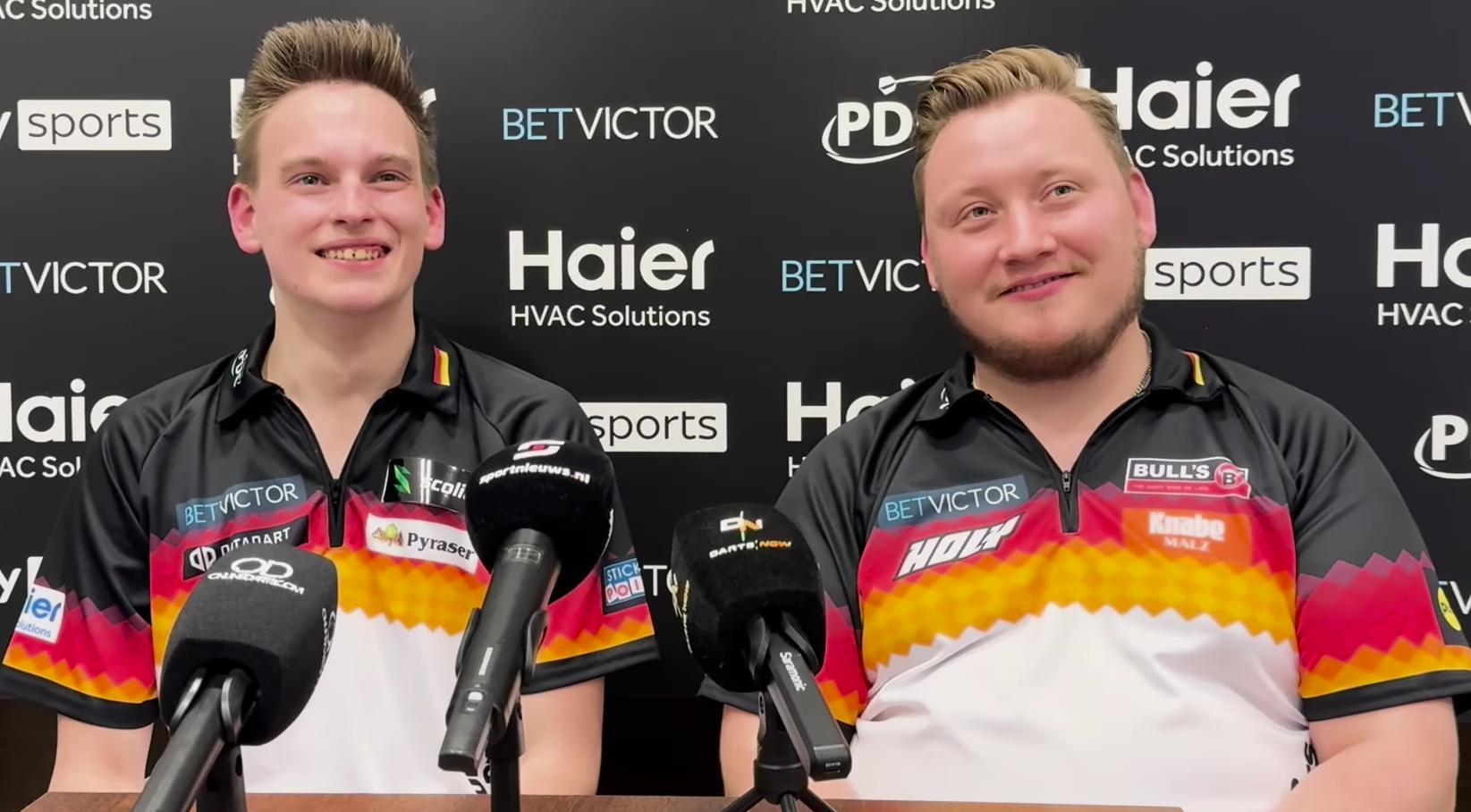
Ricardo Pietreczko and Martin Schindler of Germany eliminated defending champions England in the second round.

The second round took place on 14 June. In the afternoon session, fourth seeds Northern Ireland (Josh Rock and Daryl Gurney) began their run by defeating South Africa 8–2, while Ireland beat Switzerland 8–3, setting up a clash between the two winners in the quarter-finals. In the session's other contests, Hong Kong won 8–4 against Sweden and the Czech Republic defeated Malaysia 8–3. In the evening session, defending champions England (Luke Humphries and Luke Littler) were beaten by Germany in a shock defeat. With the score level at 2–2, Germany won five consecutive legs to take an unassailable 7–2 lead as the German crowd loudly booed the English team. Ricardo Pietreczko secured the 8–4 victory with a 62 checkout. Martin Schindler stated in Germany's post-match interview, "We are delighted to go through. German darts is in good shape right now and we will continue to push forward." The Netherlands continued to whitewash their opposition as they defeated former champions Scotland (Gary Anderson and Peter Wright) 8–0 to extend their leg-winning streak to 16. Gian van Veen commented, "Before tonight I had never beaten Peter or Gary. They are two legends of the game, so to do the double and beat them both is amazing!" Two-time champions Wales (Jonny Clayton and Gerwyn Price) advanced by beating the Philippines 8–2 and Australia also went through, defeating Argentina 8–1.

=== Quarter-finals, semi-finals and final ===
The quarter-finals, semi-finals and final all took place on 15 June. Northern Ireland progressed to the semi-finals by overturning a 5–4 deficit to defeat Ireland 8–5. In an interview afterwards, Daryl Gurney described the match as "a great advert for Irish darts". Damon Heta missed a match dart to seal an 8–6 victory for Australia over Germany, allowing Germany to come back and win the match in a deciding leg. Wales recorded a three-dart average of 99.66 to beat Hong Kong 8–4. The Netherlands lost their first legs of the tournament to the Czech Republic but still emerged as 8–2 victors.

In the semi-finals, Northern Ireland were dominant in an 8–1 triumph against Germany, while Wales came back from 4–2 down to beat the Netherlands 8–5, setting up a final between fourth seeds Northern Ireland and second seeds Wales. Northern Ireland were taking part in their first World Cup final, while Wales were looking to win their third title.

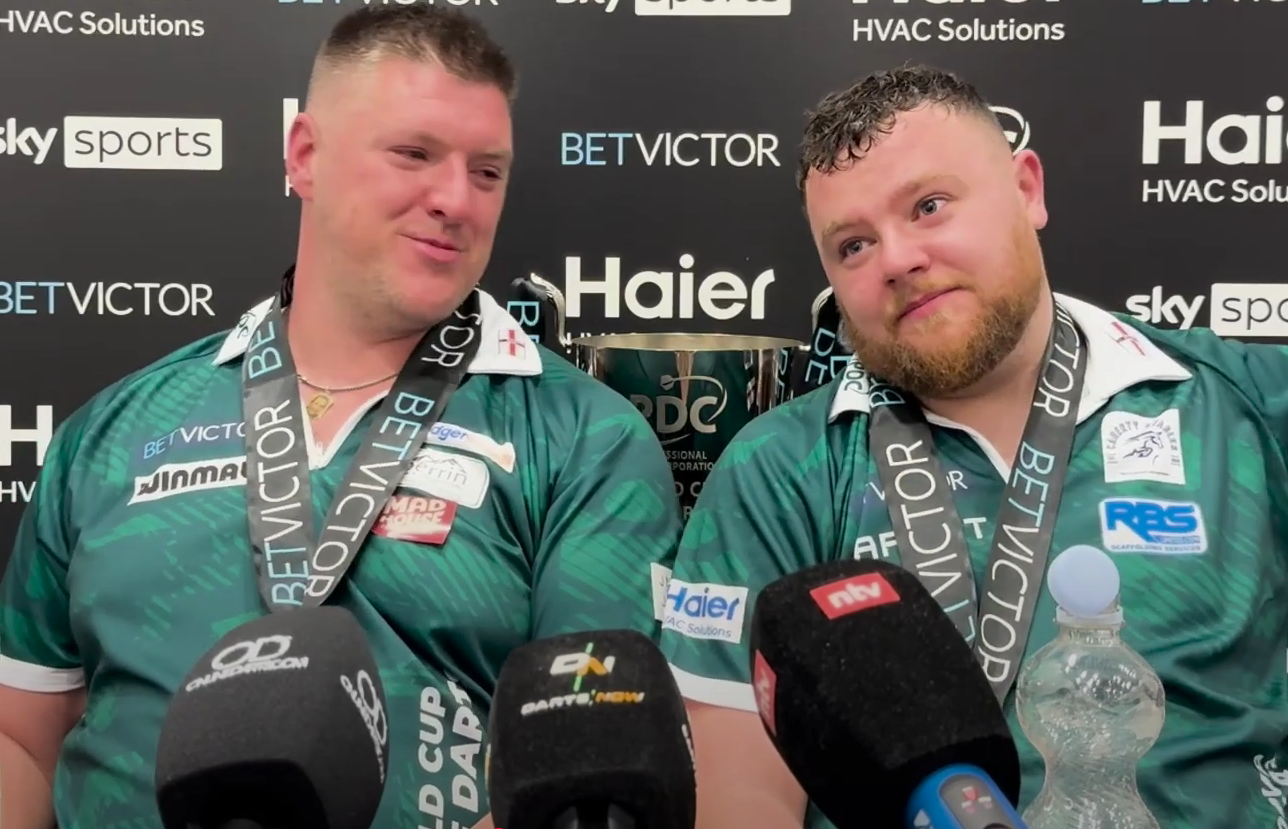
Northern Ireland's Daryl Gurney and Josh Rock were crowned champions after defeating Wales 10–9.

In the final (best of 19 legs), Wales established a 7–5 lead to go three legs away from victory, but Northern Ireland claimed the next four to go 9–7 ahead. With the score at 9–8, Northern Ireland missed four match darts and Wales took the leg to level the match at 9–9 – a last-leg shootout to determine the champion. In the deciding leg, Northern Ireland secured the title by winning in 11 darts, with Daryl Gurney hitting the match-winning double eight. Northern Ireland claimed their first World Cup title and became the sixth nation to win the tournament, as well as the first new nation to triumph since Australia in 2022. Gurney expressed his pride in winning the tournament alongside Josh Rock, claiming: "I put this in higher regard than I did winning an individual event," before adding that he thought he would have a sore head the next morning. Rock also conveyed his delight by saying, "It's a privilege to represent your country. To make history and to win a World Cup for Northern Ireland is unreal. There will always be a star on our shirt from now on. I'm so proud of that." Gurney expressed his gratitude to his Welsh opponents, who applauded the Northern Irish team post-match. Jonny Clayton congratulated the winners and declared his admiration for Welsh teammate Gerwyn Price: "Gezzy is a class act, I'm a proud man to have a teammate like him." Price talked highly of Northern Ireland's performance before saying, "At 9–9 we gave ourselves a chance but they were a bit better than us and they deserve it."

== Group stage ==
The group stage draw was announced on 4 June. Bracketed numbers in the tables show the seedings for the top twelve teams in the group stage. The figures to the right of a nation's name state their three-dart average in a match. Nations in bold denote match winners.

All group matches were best of seven legs
After three games, the team that finished top in each group qualified for the knockout stage
If teams were tied on points after all the matches were completed, the ties were broken based on leg difference, then legs for, then legs against, then legs won against the throw. If they remained tied, then a team's overall three-dart average was taken into account.

NB: P = Played; W = Won; L = Lost; LF = Legs for; LA = Legs against; +/- = Leg difference; Pts = Points

=== Group A ===
Pos.	Team	P	W	L	LF	LA	+/-	Pts	Status
1	**Netherlands (5)**	**2**	**2**	**0**	**8**	**0**	**+8**	**4**	**Q**
2	Italy	2	1	1	4	4	0	**2**	E
3	Hungary	2	0	2	0	8	–8	**0**	E

12 June

**Netherlands 95.43**	**4**–0	Italy 75.14

13 June

**Italy 81.24**	**4**–0	Hungary 79.54
**Netherlands 80.16**	**4**–0	Hungary 68.79

=== Group B ===
Pos.	Team	P	W	L	LF	LA	+/-	Pts	Status
1	**Philippines**	**2**	**2**	**0**	**8**	**5**	**+3**	**4**	**Q**
2	Belgium (6)	2	1	1	7	5	+2	**2**	E
3	Latvia	2	0	2	3	8	–5	**0**	E

12 June

**Belgium 91.59**	**4**–1	Latvia 82.87

13 June

Latvia 85.61	2–**4**	**Philippines 89.03**
Belgium 87.52	3–**4**	**Philippines 82.99**

=== Group C ===
Pos.	Team	P	W	L	LF	LA	+/-	Pts	Status
1	**Germany (7)**	2	2	0	8	2	+6	**4**	**Q**
2	Singapore	2	1	1	4	6	–2	**2**	E
3	Portugal	2	0	2	4	8	–4	**0**	E

12 June

**Germany 85.08**	**4**–2	Portugal 84.74

13 June

Portugal 81.28	2–**4**	**Singapore 90.12**
**Germany 95.43**	**4**–0	Singapore 80.38

=== Group D ===
Pos.	Team	P	W	L	LF	LA	+/-	Pts	Status
1	**Ireland (8)**	**2**	**1**	**1**	**6**	**6**	**0**	**2**	**Q** (Note: Ireland qualified based on legs won against throw. Ireland 3, Gibraltar 2, China 2)
2	Gibraltar	2	1	1	6	6	0	**2**	E
3	China	2	1	1	6	6	0	**2**	E

12 June

**Ireland 92.41**	**4**–2	Gibraltar 77.35

13 June

**Gibraltar 78.29**	**4**–2	China 74.31
Ireland 81.57	2–**4**	**China 79.49**

=== Group E ===
Pos.	Team	P	W	L	LF	LA	+/-	Pts	Status
1	**South Africa**	**2**	**1**	**1**	**7**	**5**	**+2**	**2**	**Q**
2	Poland (9)	2	1	1	6	7	–1	**2**	E
3	Norway	2	1	1	5	6	–1	**2**	E

12 June

**Poland 83.21**	**4**–3	South Africa 79.49

13 June

**South Africa 76.08**	**4**–1	Norway 70.99
Poland 84.73	2–**4**	**Norway 78.40**

=== Group F ===
Pos.	Team	P	W	L	LF	LA	+/-	Pts	Status
1	**Malaysia**	**2**	**2**	**0**	**8**	**2**	**+6**	**4**	**Q**
2	Denmark	2	1	1	5	5	0	**2**	E
3	Canada (10)	2	0	2	2	8	–6	**0**	E

12 June

Canada 79.04	1–**4**	**Malaysia 85.89**

13 June

Canada 88.41	1–**4**	**Denmark 89.38**
**Malaysia 74.78**	**4**–1	Denmark 76.19

=== Group G ===
Pos.	Team	P	W	L	LF	LA	+/-	Pts	Status
1	**Sweden (11)**	**2**	**1**	**1**	**7**	**5**	**+2**	**2**	**Q**
2	France	2	1	1	7	7	0	**2**	E
3	Lithuania	2	1	1	5	7	–2	**2**	E

12 June

**Sweden 85.11**	**4**–1	Lithuania 88.19

13 June

**Lithuania 81.32**	**4**–3	France 80.17
Sweden 79.50	3–**4**	**France 78.19**

=== Group H ===
Pos.	Team	P	W	L	LF	LA	+/-	Pts	Status
1	**Australia**	**2**	**2**	**0**	**8**	**1**	**+7**	**4**	**Q**
2	Austria (12)	2	1	1	5	5	0	**2**	E
3	Spain	2	0	2	1	8	–7	**0**	E

12 June

**Austria 99.38**	**4**–1	Spain 86.57

13 June

Spain 70.15	0–**4**	**Australia 98.56**
Austria 90.70	1–**4**	**Australia 94.42**

=== Group I ===
Pos.	Team	P	W	L	LF	LA	+/-	Pts	Status
1	**Hong Kong**	**2**	**2**	**0**	**8**	**1**	**+7**	**4**	**Q**
2	United States (13)	2	1	1	5	5	0	**2**	E
3	Bahrain	2	0	2	1	8	–7	**0**	E

12 June

United States 72.13	1–**4**	**Hong Kong 77.49**

13 June

**United States 65.44**	**4**–1	Bahrain 53.27
**Hong Kong 88.41**	**4**–0	Bahrain 63.23

=== Group J ===
Pos.	Team	P	W	L	LF	LA	+/-	Pts	Status
1	**Czech Republic (14)**	**2**	**2**	**0**	**8**	**4**	**+4**	**4**	**Q**
2	Chinese Taipei	2	1	1	6	6	0	**2**	E
3	India	2	0	2	4	8	–4	**0**	E

12 June

**Czech Republic 90.73**	**4**–2	Chinese Taipei 85.22

13 June

**Chinese Taipei 74.47**	**4**–2	India 69.23
**Czech Republic 77.97**	**4**–2	India 73.86

=== Group K ===
Pos.	Team	P	W	L	LF	LA	+/-	Pts	Status
1	**Switzerland**	**2**	**1**	**1**	**7**	**5**	**+2**	**2**	**Q**
2	Croatia (15)	2	1	1	7	7	0	**2**	E
3	Japan	2	1	1	5	7	–2	**2**	E

12 June

Croatia 80.62	3–**4**	**Japan 80.64**

13 June

**Croatia 83.27**	**4**–3	Switzerland 74.66
Japan 82.18	1–**4**	**Switzerland 91.34**

=== Group L ===
Pos.	Team	P	W	L	LF	LA	+/-	Pts	Status
1	**Argentina**	**2**	**2**	**0**	**8**	**4**	**+4**	**4**	**Q**
2	New Zealand	2	1	1	7	4	+3	**2**	E
3	Finland (16)	2	0	2	1	8	–7	**0**	E

12 June

Finland 71.83	0–**4**	**New Zealand 85.89**

13 June

Finland 82.52	1–**4**	**Argentina 84.10**
New Zealand 88.68	3–**4**	**Argentina 83.49**

== Knockout stage ==
England, Wales, Scotland and Northern Ireland entered the tournament in the knockout stage. The twelve group winners were drawn into the bracket at random following the culmination of the group stage. Numbers to the left of nations' names show the seedings for the top sixteen teams in the tournament. The figures to the right of a nation's name state their three-dart average in a match. Players in bold denote match winners.

**Second round** (best of 15 legs); 14 June
1	England 93.34	4
**7**	**Germany 93.70**	**8**
Argentina 82.92	1
**Australia 85.05**	**8**
**4**	**Northern Ireland 88.66**	**8**
South Africa 91.83	2
Switzerland 73.52	3
**8**	**Ireland 85.91**	**8**
**2**	**Wales 96.43**	**8**
Philippines 89.17	2
**Hong Kong 94.16**	**8**
11	Sweden 82.92	4
3	Scotland 79.37	0
**5**	**Netherlands 100.20**	**8**
Malaysia 81.21	3
**14**	**Czech Republic 89.69**	**8**

**Quarter-finals** (best of 15 legs); 15 June
**7**	**Germany 87.83**	**8**
Australia 86.01	7
**4**	**Northern Ireland 93.40**	**8**
8	Ireland 94.29	5
**2**	**Wales 99.66**	**8**
Hong Kong 86.57	4
**5**	**Netherlands 93.63**	**8**
14	Czech Republic 85.18	2

**Semi-finals** (best of 15 legs); 15 June
7	Germany 82.63	1
**4**	**Northern Ireland 96.82**	**8**
**2**	**Wales 86.49**	**8**
5	Netherlands 87.21	5

**Final** (best of 19 legs); 15 June
**4**	**Northern Ireland 95.96**	**10**
2	Wales 92.95	9
