= Matt Campbell (darts player) =

Canadian darts player (born 1989)

Personal information
- Full name: Matthew Campbell
- Nickname: "Ginja Ninja"
- Born: 29 September 1989 (age 37) Hamilton, Ontario, Canada

Sport
- Sport: Darts
- Playing since: 2014
- Darts: 22g Galaxy
- Laterality: Right-handed
- Walk-on music: "On Top of the World" by Imagine Dragons

Organisation (see split in darts)
- PDC: 2019– (Tour Card: 2022–2025)

WDF major events – best performances
- World Masters: Last 128: 2019

PDC premier events – best performances
- World Championship: Last 32: 2024
- UK Open: Last 64: 2023
- Grand Slam: Group Stage: 2021
- PC Finals: Last 16: 2022
- World Series Finals: Last 16: 2022

Other tournament wins
- Years
K-W Tri City Open	2020
North American Championship	2024, 2025
PDC Challenge Tour	2021 (x3)
Syracuse Open	2019
CDC Pro Tour (x5)
2019 (×2), 2020, 2021, 2022

Matthew Campbell (born 29 September 1989) is a Canadian professional darts player who competes in Professional Darts Corporation (PDC) events. Nicknamed "Ginja Ninja", Campbell has won two PDC North American Championships, in 2024 and 2025. He has also won five titles on the CDC Pro Tour. Campbell won three titles on the 2021 PDC European Challenge Tour, earning a PDC Tour Card through finishing first on the ranking.

Campbell has been the runner-up in a Players Championship event twice, in 2022 and 2024. His best major performance is reaching the last 16 at the 2022 Players Championship Finals.

== Career ==
In 2019, Campbell won the ADO Syracuse Open where he defeated Darin Young in the final. On the CDC Pro Tour, he finished as the best Canadian player and qualified for the 2020 PDC World Darts Championship. He played Mark McGeeney in the first round and lost the match 3–1. On the 2020 CDC Pro Tour he finished as the best Canadian player and qualified for the 2021 PDC World Darts Championship, where lost 3-2 to Scott Waites in the first round.

In 2021, he won three PDC European Challenge Tour tournaments and topped the ranking, thus he earned a PDC Tour Card for 2022/2023, a place at the 2022 PDC World Darts Championship and a place at the 2021 Grand Slam of Darts. He played in Group F at the Grand Slam and lost all three matches to Mensur Suljovic, José De Sousa and Luke Humphries, finishing last in his group.

He faced Adrian Lewis in the first round of the 2022 PDC World Darts Championship. Campbell won the first set, but eventually lost 3–1 and was eliminated. In April 2022, he reached his first PDC Pro Tour final at Players Championship 13, where he lost 8–6 to Nathan Aspinall.

The 2024 PDC World Darts Championship saw Campbell win his first match at the competition, defeating Lourence Ilagan 3–2 in the first round. He followed up his first victory with a 3–2 win over thirteenth seed James Wade in the second round. He was defeated 4–1 by Luke Littler in the third round.

In 2024, Campbell won the North American Darts Championship by defeating Stowe Buntz 6–4 in the final. The result would've allowed him to automatically qualify for both the 2024 Grand Slam of Darts and the 2025 PDC World Darts Championship. However, under PDC Rule 3.9, Campbell was not eligible to do so, as he held his Tour Card for more than two years. Despite this setback, Campbell still managed to qualify for the World Championship through the PDC Tour Card Holder Qualifier, where he defeated Mario Vandenbogaerde 6–1 and Andy Baetens 6–3 before beating Mervyn King in their quarter's final 7–6 in a deciding leg. Campbell won his first-round match 3–2 against Mensur Suljović but was eliminated by Ryan Searle in the second round. He also reached his second Pro Tour final in July 2024, losing to Dimitri Van den Bergh 8–3 in the final of Players Championship 12.

Campbell became the first player to retain the North American Championship by winning the 2025 final 6–3 against fellow Canadian Jim Long. Once again, he was ineligible to use this win to qualify for the 2025 Grand Slam and 2026 World Championship. Campbell would still qualify for the latter tournament by finishing 32nd on the PDC Pro Tour Order of Merit. He lost 3–1 to Adam Sevada in the first round.

== World Championship results ==
=== PDC ===
- 2020: First round (lost to Mark McGeeney 1–3)
- 2021: First round (lost to Scott Waites 2–3)
- 2022: First round (lost to Adrian Lewis 1–3)
- 2023: First round (lost to Danny Baggish 0–3)
- 2024: Third round (lost to Luke Littler 1–4)
- 2025: Second round (lost to Ryan Searle 0–3)
- 2026: First round (lost to Adam Sevada 1–3)

== Performance timeline ==
Tournament	2020	2021	2022	2023	2024	2025	2026
PDC Ranked televised events
World Championship	1R	1R	1R	1R	3R	2R	1R
UK Open	DNQ		1R	4R	3R	4R	DNQ
Grand Slam	DNQ	RR	Did not qualify				
Players Championship Finals	DNQ		3R	2R	Did not qualify		
PDC Non-ranked televised events
World Cup	QF	1R	1R	2R	RR	RR	DNQ
World Series Finals	DNQ		2R	Did not qualify			
PDC Other televised events
North American Championship	NH		QF	F	W	W	DNQ
Career statistics
Season-end ranking	125	111	75	48	54	67	

=== PDC European Tour ===
Season	1	2	3	4	5	6	7	8	9	10	11	12	13	14
2022	Did not qualify			ADO; 1R	Did not qualify									
2023	DNQ		IDO; 2R	GDG; 1R	ADO; 2R	DDC; DNQ	BDO; 3R	CDO; 1R	EDG; DNQ	EDM; 1R	DNQ			
2025	BDO; 3R	EDT; DNQ	IDO; 1R	GDG; DNQ	ADO; 3R	DNQ		EDO; QF	Did not qualify					

=== PDC Players Championships ===
Season	1	2	3	4	5	6	7	8	9	10	11	12	13	14	15	16	17	18	19	20	21	22	23	24	25	26	27	28	29	30	31	32	33	34
2022	BAR; 1R	BAR; 1R	WIG; 2R	WIG; 1R	BAR; 4R	BAR; 1R	NIE; 2R	NIE; 3R	BAR; 2R	BAR; 2R	BAR; 2R	BAR; 2R	BAR; F	WIG; 2R	WIG; DNP	NIE; 3R	NIE; 1R	BAR; 2R	BAR; 4R	BAR; 2R	BAR; 2R	BAR; 1R	BAR; 1R	BAR; 4R	BAR; 2R	BAR; QF	BAR; 2R	BAR; 1R	BAR; 1R	BAR; 2R				
2023	BAR; 1R	BAR; 1R	BAR; SF	BAR; 2R	BAR; 1R	BAR; 4R	HIL; 1R	HIL; 2R	WIG; 1R	WIG; 2R	LEI; 1R	LEI; 2R	HIL; 1R	HIL; 2R	LEI; 3R	LEI; 1R	HIL; 2R	HIL; 1R	BAR; 2R	BAR; 2R	BAR; 2R	BAR; 1R	BAR; 1R	BAR; 2R	BAR; 1R	BAR; 4R	BAR; 1R	BAR; 4R	BAR; 1R	BAR; 1R				
2024	WIG; 1R	WIG; 1R	LEI; 1R	LEI; 1R	HIL; DNP		LEI; 1R	LEI; 1R	HIL; 1R	HIL; 3R	HIL; 1R	HIL; F	MIL; 2R	MIL; 2R	MIL; DNP			MIL; 3R	MIL; 2R	WIG; 1R	WIG; 1R	LEI; 3R	LEI; 2R	WIG; 1R	WIG; 3R	WIG; 1R	WIG; 1R	WIG; 1R	LEI; 2R	LEI; 1R				
2025	WIG; 1R	WIG; 1R	ROS; 1R	ROS; 1R	LEI; 1R	LEI; 2R	HIL; 1R	HIL; 1R	LEI; 3R	LEI; 2R	LEI; 1R	LEI; 3R	ROS; 2R	ROS; 1R	HIL; 1R	HIL; 1R	LEI; 2R	LEI; 1R	LEI; 1R	DNP				MIL; 1R	MIL; 2R	HIL; 1R	HIL; 1R	LEI; 1R	LEI; 2R	LEI; 1R	WIG; 1R	WIG; 1R	WIG; 4R	WIG; 4R

Performance Table Legend
W	Won the tournament	F	Finalist	SF	Semifinalist	QF	Quarterfinalist	#R; RR; Prel.	Lost in # round Round-robin; Preliminary round	DQ	Disqualified
DNQ	Did not qualify	DNP	Did not participate	WD	Withdrew	NH	Tournament not held	#R; RR; Prel.	Lost in # round Round-robin; Preliminary round	NYF	Not yet founded
