= Lourence Ilagan =

Filipino darts player (born 1978)

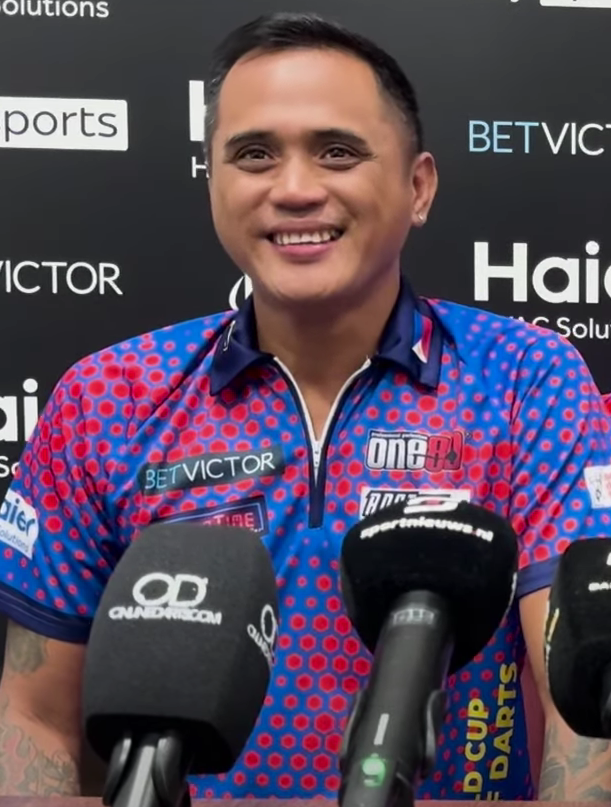
- Ilagan with the Philippines at the 2025 PDC World Cup of Darts

Personal information
- Full name: Lourence Gregorio Ilagan
- Nickname: "The Gunner"
- Born: 11 February 1978 (age 48) Manila, Philippines
- Home town: Cainta, Philippines

Sport
- Sport: Darts
- Playing since: 1993
- Darts: 18g One80 (soft-tip); 22g One80 (steel-tip)
- Laterality: Right-handed
- Walk-on music: "Three Stars And A Sun" by Francis M.

Organisation (see split in darts)
- BDO: 2000–2011
- PDC: 2012–

WDF major events – best performances
- World Masters: Semi-final: 2009

PDC premier events – best performances
- World Championship: Last 64: 2013, 2023
- Grand Slam: Group Stage: 2024

Other tournament wins
- Years
Korean Open	2025
Philippines Open	2005, 2011
Hong Kong Open	2013
Malaysian Open	2015
Philippines Cup	2011
Philippines Masters	2007, 2011
Dartslive Grand Final	2013
Dartslive Asia	2015
Dartslive China	2013
Dartslive Hong Kong	2012
Dartslive Las Vegas	2012, 2013
PDC Asia
PDC Asian Championship (×2)	2024, 2025
PDC Asian Tour (×16)	2018 (×3); 2019 (×3); 2023 (×2); 2024 (×3); 2025 (×4); 2026 (×1)
Medal record
Men's Darts
Representing Philippines
WDF Asia-Pacific Cup
Gold medal – first place	2006 Kuala Lumpur	Team event
Silver medal – second place	2006 Kuala Lumpur	Men's pairs
Bronze medal – third place	2000 Manila	Team event

Lourence Gregorio Ilagan (born 11 February 1978) is a Filipino professional soft-tip and steel-tip darts player who competes in Professional Darts Corporation (PDC) and international soft-tip events. He is a two-time back-to-back PDC Asian Champion, winning the event in both 2024 and 2025. Ilagan has won 16 PDC Asian Tour titles.

Ilagan also reached the semi-finals of the 2009 BDO World Masters and has represented the Philippines at both the WDF Asia-Pacific Cup and the PDC World Cup of Darts.

== Career ==
Ilagan is a two-time quarter-finalist (2000 and 2006) in the WDF Asia-Pacific Cup. He has also reached the final of the Philippines Open in 2006 and 2007 along with the final of the 2008 Malaysian Open. Ilagan won the National Darts Federation of the Philippines qualifier to earn a place in the 2009 PDC World Darts Championship but was beaten by Finland's Marko Kantele 5–2 in the preliminary round.

Ilagan reached the semi-finals of the 2009 Winmau World Masters after qualifying from the earlier rounds into the last 16, where he defeated number two seed Scott Waites and then beat Steve West in the quarter-finals. He lost to Robbie Green in the semi-final.

Ilagan represented the Philippines with Christian Perez in the 2012 PDC World Cup of Darts and together they were beaten 5–3 by the United States in the first round.

Ilagan won the Philippines Qualifying Event for the 2013 World Championship and once there came back from three to one down in legs to Jamie Lewis in the preliminary round to win 4–3. He faced Colin Osborne in the first round and despite impressing with some clinical finishes, he lost 3–0. He was due to play with Perez once more in the 2013 World Cup of Darts but they were forced to withdraw due to travel problems. Later in the year he won the Hong Kong Open by beating Edward Santos in the final.

He defeated Perez 4–1 to win the 2013 World Soft Darts Championship having eliminated Stephen Bunting in the quarter-finals and Randy Van Deursen in the semis. Ilagan credited his eight hours a day practice routine in being key to his success and he earned $1,000,000 HK in the process. In 2014, Ilagan was beaten in the semi-finals of the Chinese Dartslive event.

Ilagan won the 2015 Soft Tip Dartslive Asia Open by beating Hyun Chul Park in the final. He partnered Gilbert Ulang at the World Cup of Darts and they lost 5–1 to Belgium in the opening round. A victory over Daisuke Akamatsu saw Ilagan claim the Malaysian Open. He came within a match of playing in the 2016 World Championship, but lost 3–2 to Alex Tagarao in the final of the Philippines Qualifier.

In 2018, Ilagan started playing on the newly established PDC Asian Tour. He topped the 2018 Asian Tour final ranking and qualified for the 2019 PDC World Darts Championship, his first World Championship in six years. He lost to Vincent van der Voort in the first round.

At the 2023 PDC World Darts Championship, Ilagan earned his first ever first round win at the competition, defeating Rowby-John Rodriguez in a deciding set.

Ilagan won his first PDC Asian Championship in 2024 after defeating fellow countryman Sandro Eric Sosing 7–3 in the final. This title meant he qualified for the 2024 Grand Slam of Darts. He was drawn into a group with recent World Championship finalist and Premier League champion Luke Littler, UK Open champion Dimitri Van den Bergh and Keane Barry. He went winless and finished bottom of the group.

== World Championship results ==
=== PDC World Championship ===
- 2009: Preliminary round (lost to Marko Kantele 2–5) (legs)
- 2013: First round (lost to Colin Osborne 0–3) (sets)
- 2019: First round (lost to Vincent van der Voort 1–3)
- 2020: First round (lost to Cristo Reyes 2–3)
- 2021: First round (lost to Ryan Murray 1–3)
- 2022: First round (lost to Raymond van Barneveld 0–3)
- 2023: Second round (lost to Dimitri Van den Bergh 0–3)
- 2024: First round (lost to Matt Campbell 2–3)
- 2025: First round (lost to Luke Woodhouse 0–3)
- 2026: First round (lost to Nathan Aspinall 1–3)

== Performance timeline ==
BDO

Tournament	2009	2010
World Masters	SF	2R

PDC

Tournament	2009	2012	2013	2015	2019	2020	2021	2022	2023	2024	2025
PDC Ranked televised events
World Championship	Prel.	DNQ	1R	DNQ	1R	1R	1R	1R	2R	1R	1R
Grand Slam	Did not qualify									RR	WD
PDC Non-ranked televised events
World Cup	NH	1R	WD	1R	1R	1R	1R	1R	2R	DNP	2R

Performance Table Legend
W	Won the tournament	F	Finalist	SF	Semifinalist	QF	Quarterfinalist	#R; RR; Prel.	Lost in # round Round-robin; Preliminary round	DQ	Disqualified
DNQ	Did not qualify	DNP	Did not participate	WD	Withdrew	NH	Tournament not held	#R; RR; Prel.	Lost in # round Round-robin; Preliminary round	NYF	Not yet founded
