= 2024 PDC World Cup of Darts =

Tournament information
- Dates: 27–30 June 2024
- Venue: Eissporthalle
- Location: Frankfurt, Germany
- Organisation(s): Professional Darts Corporation (PDC)
- Format: Legs
- Prize fund: £450,000
- Winner's share: £80,000
- High checkout: 170 Bruno Stöckli

Champion(s)
- England (Luke Humphries and Michael Smith)

The 2024 PDC World Cup of Darts, known as the 2024 BetVictor World Cup of Darts for sponsorship reasons, was the fourteenth edition of the PDC World Cup of Darts. It took place from 27 to 30 June 2024 at the Eissporthalle in Frankfurt, Germany.

Wales were the defending champions, after Jonny Clayton and Gerwyn Price defeated the Scotland team, consisting of Peter Wright and Gary Anderson, 10–2 in the 2023 final. They were represented by Clayton and Jim Williams, and were eliminated in the second round, losing 6–8 to Croatia.

England (represented by Luke Humphries and Michael Smith) won their record-breaking fifth World Cup, defeating Austria 10–6 in the final.

== Format ==
The new format introduced in the 2023 tournament remained, with forty teams taking part. The top four teams were seeded to the second round, with the other 36 competing in a group stage of 12 groups of three, with one qualifying from each group.

In this format, all rounds were a single match played in doubles format:

- Group stage: Best of seven legs
- Second round, quarter and semi-finals: Best of fifteen legs
- Final: Best of nineteen legs

== Prize money ==
The total prize money remained at £450,000.

The prize money per team was:

Position (no. of teams)		Prize money (Total: £450,000)
Winners	(1)	£80,000
Runners-Up	(1)	£50,000
Semi-finalists	(2)	£30,000
Quarter-finalists	(4)	£20,000
Last 16 (Second round)	(8)	£9,000
Second in group	(12)	£5,000
Third in group	(12)	£4,000

== Teams and seedings ==
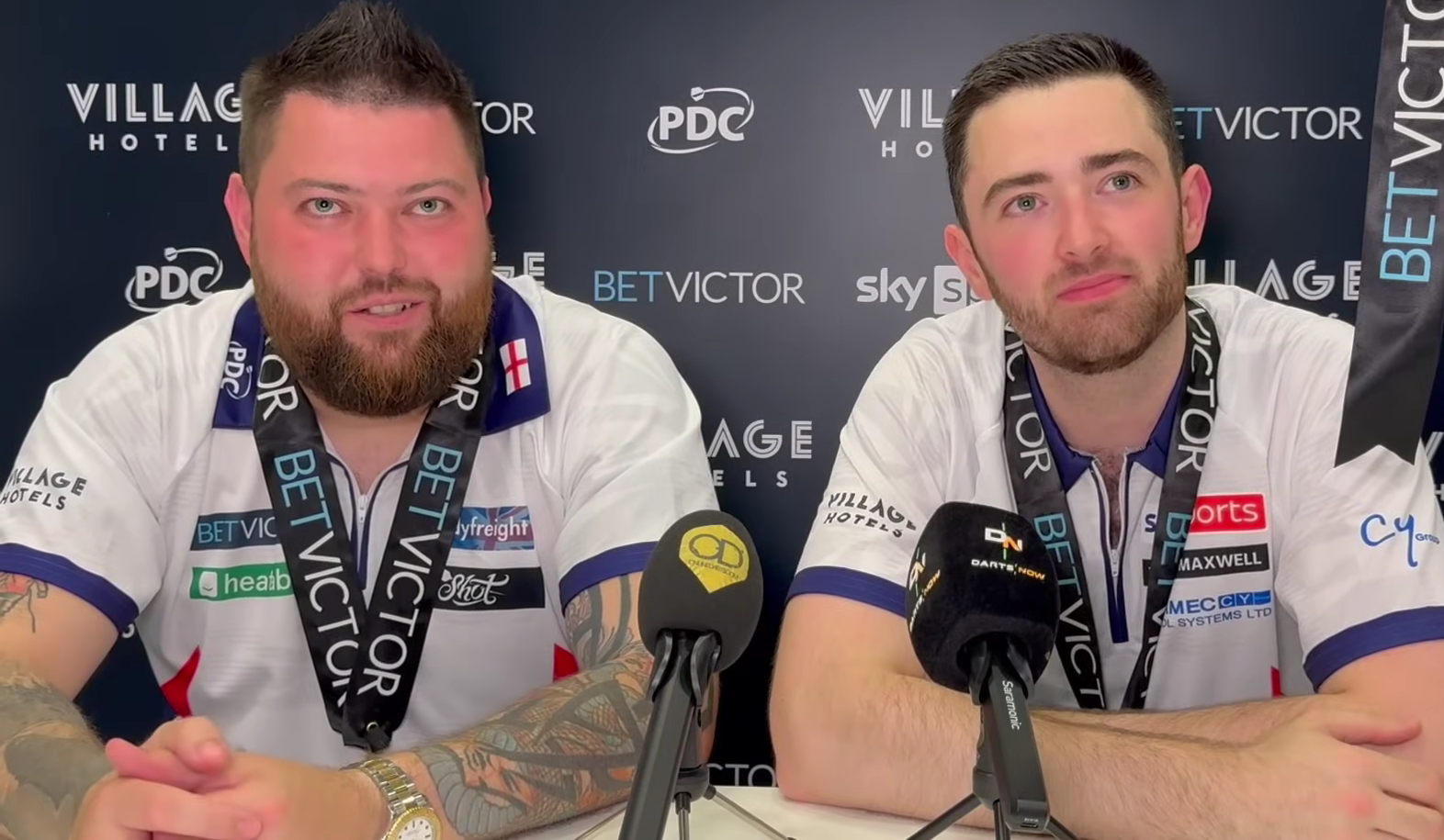
The winning England team of Michael Smith and Luke Humphries

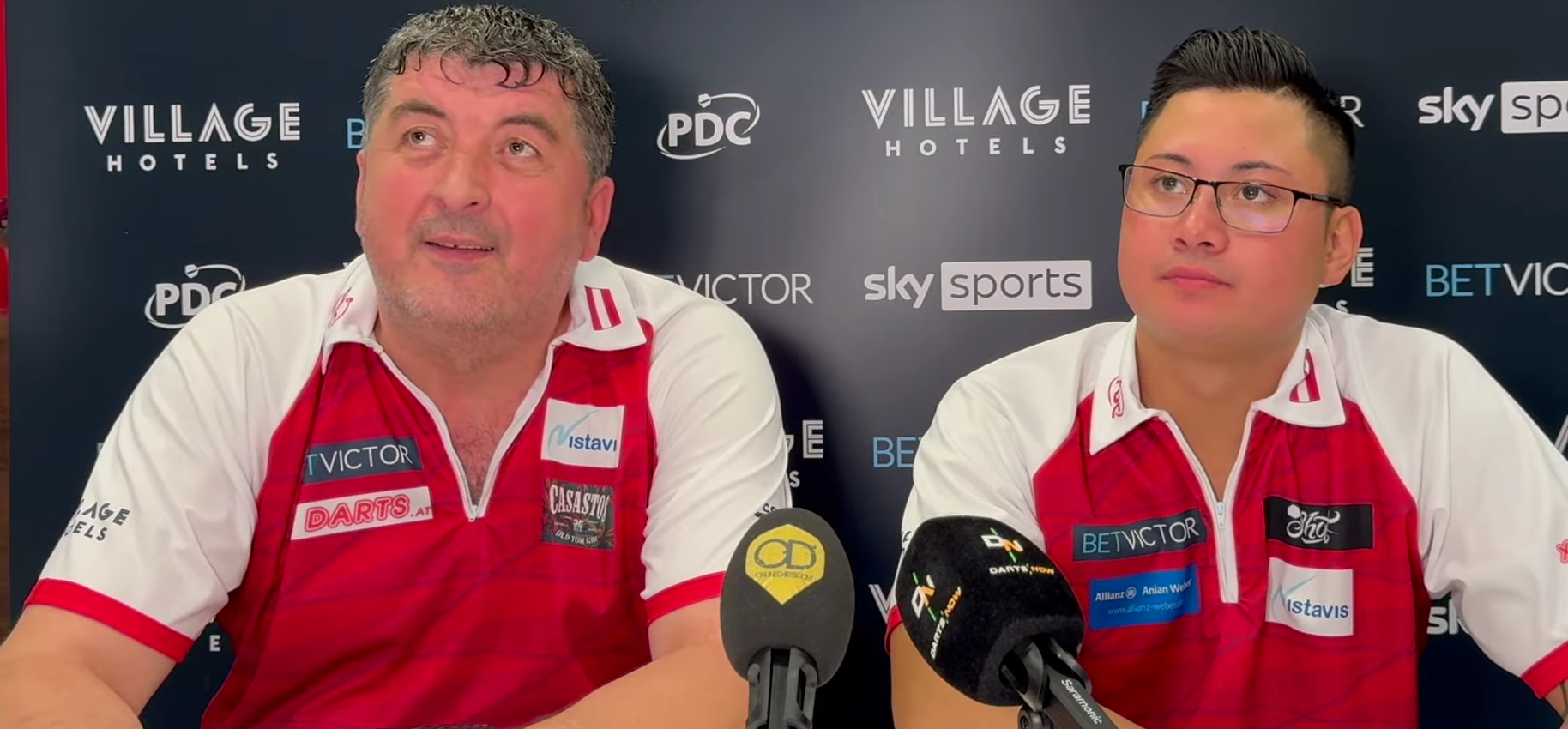
The runners-up, Austria (Mensur Suljovic and Rowby-John Rodriguez)

The 40 nations taking part in the tournament were confirmed on 22 May, with three changes to the 2023 tournament.

As in 2023, a qualifier was held to determine the Latin American representative, which was won again by Guyana. For the first time, an Asian qualifier was held. However, five Asian teams were given automatic spots, with three more spots available in the qualifier. Singapore, Chinese Taipei and Malaysia came through the qualifier. Chinese Taipei made their World Cup debut, while Malaysia returned for the first time since 2014. Of the 2023 participants, India and Thailand failed to qualify and did not return.

Ukraine did not return after debuting in 2023, while Norway returned for the first time since 2016.

The top two players from nations represented by the PDC Order of Merit were confirmed on 27 May; the top players from nations on the PDC Asian Tour were confirmed on 19 May, and the top players from the Nordic & Baltic regions were confirmed on 2 June.

The players for the tournament were finalised on 18 June.

The top four nations based on combined Order of Merit rankings were seeded to the second round, while the next twelve nations will be seeded in the group stage. Gerwyn Price withdrew after the draw and was replaced with Jim Williams – as this was after the draw Wales's seeding was maintained.

The teams and players were as follows:

Seeded nations (Top four to second round)

Rank	Country	Players
1	England	Luke Humphries and Michael Smith
2	Wales	Jonny Clayton and Jim Williams
3	Netherlands	Michael van Gerwen and Danny Noppert
4	Scotland	Peter Wright and Gary Anderson
5	Belgium	Dimitri Van den Bergh and Kim Huybrechts
6	Northern Ireland	Josh Rock and Brendan Dolan
7	Germany	Martin Schindler and Gabriel Clemens
8	Australia	Damon Heta and Simon Whitlock
9	Ireland	William O'Connor and Keane Barry
10	Austria	Rowby-John Rodriguez and Mensur Suljović
11	Poland	Krzysztof Ratajski and Radek Szagański
12	Czech Republic	Adam Gawlas and Karel Sedláček
13	Croatia	Boris Krčmar and Romeo Grbavac
14	France	Thibault Tricole and Jacques Labre
15	Sweden	Jeffrey de Graaf and Oskar Lukasiak
16	United States	Danny Lauby and Jules van Dongen

Unseeded nations

Country	Players
Bahrain	Duda Durra and Basem Mahmood
Canada	David Cameron and Matt Campbell
China	Chengan Liu and Xiaochen Zong
Chinese Taipei	Teng Lieh Pupo and An-Sheng Lu
Denmark	Benjamin Reus and Claus Bendix Nielsen
Finland	Teemu Harju and Marko Kantele
Gibraltar	Craig Galliano and Justin Hewitt
Guyana	Sudesh Fitzgerald and Norman Madhoo
Hong Kong	Lok Yin Lee and Man Lok Leung
Hungary	Gábor Jagicza and Nándor Major
Iceland	Pétur Rúðrik Guðmundsson and Arngrímur Ólafsson
Italy	Massimo Dalla Rosa and Michele Turetta
Japan	Ryusei Azemoto and Tomoya Goto
Latvia	Valters Melderis and Madars Razma
Lithuania	Mindaugas Barauskas and Darius Labanauskas
Malaysia	Mohd-Nasr Bin Jantan and Siik Hwang Wong
New Zealand	Haupai Puha and Ben Robb
Norway	Cor Dekker and Håkon Bjørge Helling
Philippines	Christian Perez and Alexis Toylo
Portugal	José de Sousa and David Gomes
Singapore	Harith Lim and Paul Lim
South Africa	Cameron Carolissen and Johan Geldenhuys
Spain	José Justicia and Jesús Noguera
Switzerland	Stefan Bellmont and Bruno Stöckli

== Stages ==
All group matches were best of 7 legs
After three games, the team that finished top in each group qualified for the knock-out stage
If teams were tied on points after all the matches were completed, the ties were broken based on leg difference

NB: P = Played; W = Won; L = Lost; LF = Legs for; LA = Legs against; LD = Leg difference; Pts = Points

=== Group A ===
Pos.	Team	P	W	L	LF	LA	+/-	Pts	Status
1	Belgium (5)	2	2	0	8	2	+6	4	Q
2	Philippines	2	1	1	4	5	–1	2	E
3	Singapore	2	0	2	3	8	−5	0	E

27 June

Belgium 87.24	4–2	Singapore 75.15

28 June

Singapore 67.95	1–4	Philippines 75.64
Belgium 95.43	4–0	Philippines 68.81

=== Group B ===
Pos.	Team	P	W	L	LF	LA	+/-	Pts	Status
1	Northern Ireland (6)	2	2	0	8	4	+4	4	Q
2	South Africa	2	1	1	5	6	−1	2	E
3	Switzerland	2	0	2	5	8	–3	0	E

27 June

Northern Ireland 94.52	4–1	South Africa 75.42

28 June

South Africa 87.06	4–2	Switzerland 79.27
Northern Ireland 86.43	4–3	Switzerland 90.95

=== Group C ===
Pos.	Team	P	W	L	LF	LA	+/-	Pts	Status
1	Germany (7)	2	2	0	8	4	+4	4	Q
2	New Zealand	2	1	1	7	4	+3	2	E
3	Finland	2	0	2	1	8	–7	0	E

27 June

Germany 94.51	4–3	New Zealand 89.89

28 June

New Zealand 91.09	4–0	Finland 78.05
Germany 92.58	4–1	Finland 86.30

=== Group D ===
Pos.	Team	P	W	L	LF	LA	+/-	Pts	Status
1	Australia (8)	2	2	0	8	5	+3	4	Q
2	Hong Kong	2	1	1	6	5	+1	2	E
3	Japan	2	0	2	4	8	−4	0	E

27 June

Australia 79.80	4–3	Japan 85.08

28 June

Japan 85.59	1–4	Hong Kong 90.99
Australia 83.72	4–2	Hong Kong 83.86

=== Group E ===
Pos.	Team	P	W	L	LF	LA	+/-	Pts	Status
1	Chinese Taipei	2	2	0	8	5	+3	4	Q
2	Ireland (9)	2	1	1	7	6	+1	2	E
3	Lithuania	2	0	2	4	8	−4	0	E

27 June

Ireland 86.76	4–2	Lithuania 77.11

28 June

Lithuania 85.05	2–4	Chinese Taipei 86.81
Ireland 94.07	3–4	Chinese Taipei 95.02

=== Group F ===
Pos.	Team	P	W	L	LF	LA	+/-	Pts	Status
1	Austria (10)	2	2	0	8	1	+7	4	Q
2	China	2	1	1	4	6	−2	2	E
3	Guyana	2	0	2	3	8	–5	0	E

27 June

Austria 93.94	4–0	China 73.95

28 June

China 72.64	4–2	Guyana 67.09
Austria 82.76	4–1	Guyana 70.07

=== Group G ===
Pos.	Team	P	W	L	LF	LA	+/-	Pts	Status
1	Poland (11)	2	2	0	8	3	+5	4	Q
2	Norway	2	1	1	6	7	−1	2	E
3	Hungary	2	0	2	4	8	–4	0	E

27 June

Poland 79.69	4–2	Norway 72.51

28 June

Norway 82.82	4–3	Hungary 80.74
Poland 82.97	4–1	Hungary 73.09

=== Group H ===
Pos.	Team	P	W	L	LF	LA	+/-	Pts	Status
1	Czech Republic (12)	2	2	0	8	3	+5	4	Q
2	Iceland	2	1	1	4	4	0	2	E
3	Bahrain	2	0	2	3	8	−5	0	E

27 June

Czech Republic 77.48	4–3	Bahrain 65.74

28 June

Bahrain 54.35	0–4	Iceland 63.28
Czech Republic 73.32	4–0	Iceland 65.67

=== Group I ===
Pos.	Team	P	W	L	LF	LA	+/-	Pts	Status
1	Croatia (13)	2	2	0	8	2	+6	4	Q
2	Canada	2	1	1	6	7	–1	2	E
3	Malaysia	2	0	2	3	8	−5	0	E

27 June

Croatia 92.49	4–0	Malaysia 73.10

28 June

Malaysia 71.52	3–4	Canada 81.85
Croatia 83.49	4–2	Canada 80.68

=== Group J ===
Pos.	Team	P	W	L	LF	LA	+/-	Pts	Status
1	France (14)	2	2	0	8	4	+4	4	Q
2	Latvia	2	1	1	5	6	−1	2	E
3	Denmark	2	0	2	5	8	–3	0	E

27 June

France 90.55	4–1	Latvia 85.35

28 June

Latvia 91.86	4–2	Denmark 77.17
France 74.56	4–3	Denmark 74.10

=== Group K ===
Pos.	Team	P	W	L	LF	LA	+/-	Pts	Status
1	Sweden (15)	2	2	0	8	1	+7	4	Q
2	Gibraltar	2	1	1	5	7	–2	2	E
3	Spain	2	0	2	3	8	−5	0	E

27 June

Sweden 98.56	4–0	Spain 82.90

28 June

Spain 75.71	3–4	Gibraltar 77.56
Sweden 82.17	4–1	Gibraltar 69.67

=== Group L ===
Pos.	Team	P	W	L	LF	LA	+/-	Pts	Status
1	Italy	2	2	0	8	5	+3	4	Q
2	Portugal	2	1	1	7	6	+1	2	E
3	United States (16)	2	0	2	4	8	−4	0	E

27 June

United States 69.00	2–4	Portugal 70.56

28 June

United States 78.37	2–4	Italy 88.19
Portugal 78.22	3–4	Italy 80.74

=== Knockout stage ===
Second round (best of 15 legs); 29 June
1	England 86.23	8
14	France 78.36	3
6	Northern Ireland 84.93	8
7	Germany 85.88	7
4	Scotland 88.86	8
11	Poland 83.40	2
12	Czech Republic 80.44	6
15	Sweden 84.06	8
2	Wales 91.69	6
13	Croatia 89.21	8
10	Austria 87.43	8
Chinese Taipei 85.53	4
3	Netherlands 100.96	2
5	Belgium 97.31	8
Italy 82.48	8
8	Australia 85.26	7

Quarter-finals (best of 15 legs); 30 June
1	England 98.73	8
6	Northern Ireland 90.61	4
4	Scotland 86.40	8
15	Sweden 88.26	7
13	Croatia 95.61	7
10	Austria 89.39	8
5	Belgium 86.21	8
Italy 85.06	7

Semi-finals (best of 15 legs); 30 June
1	England 96.39	8
4	Scotland 94.07	4
10	Austria 89.27	8
5	Belgium 85.20	3

Final (best of 19 legs); 30 June
1	England 100.62	10
10	Austria 87.96	6
