= Philippines Open (darts) =

Tournament information
- Location: Manila
- Country: Philippines
- Established: 1978
- Organisation(s): NDF
- Format: Legs

Final champion(s)
- Jhay Doria (men's); Aileen Oclarit (women's)

The Philippines Open (also known as Philippines International Darts Open) is a darts tournament held in Manila, Philippines. First edition of this tournament took place in 1978. The first winners in the 1992 of this tournament were Armando Diaz and Paulita Villanueva. Villanueva is also the most successful player, winning six tournaments in a row.

Since 2018, this event has been held by National Darts Federation of the Philippines outside the international World Darts Federation ranking, but is open to players from all over the world. The tournament takes place on the occasion of the PDC Asian Tour events held in the Philippines. Darts company Bull's has been inviting its players to participate in this event two times. The greatest successes among the entire Bull's team were achieved by Krzysztof Ratajski, who finished the competition in the Last 16 round in 2018, and won in 2019. Other invited players who take part in this event were Michael Rasztovits, Jelle Klaasen, Rowby-John Rodriguez and Rusty-Jake Rodriguez.

== List of tournaments ==
=== Men's ===
| Year | Champion | Av. | Score | Runner-Up | Av. | Prize Money | | | Venue |
| Year | Champion | Av. | Score | Runner-Up | Av. | Total | Ch. | R.-Up | Venue |
|---|---|---|---|---|---|---|---|---|---|
| 1978 | (Philippines) Leo Gonzales | | beat | (Philippines) Bumbi Veloso | | | | | Quezon City |
| 1979 | (Philippines) Bumbi Veloso | | beat | (Philippines) Danny de la Cruz | | | | | Quezon City |
| 1980 | (Philippines) Ricky Castro | | beat | (Philippines) Mario Ortega | | | | | Quezon City |
| 1981 | (Philippines) Miguel Te | | beat | (Philippines) Eddie de la Cruz | | | | | Quezon City |
| 1982 | (Philippines) Peter Kairus | | beat | (Philippines) Nelio Clutario | | | | | Quezon City |
| 1983 | (Philippines) Flor Aldon | | beat | (Philippines) Eddie de la Cruz | | | | | Quezon City |
| 1984 | (Philippines) Jake Ubaldo | | beat | (Philippines) Noel Reyes | | | | | Quezon City |
| 1985 | (Philippines) Joel Songsong | | beat | (Philippines) Nelio Clutario | | | | | Quezon City |
| 1986 | (Philippines) Ricky Castro (2) | | beat | (Philippines) Juan de la Cruz | | | | | Quezon City |
| 1987 | (Philippines) Andrew Arrieta | | beat | (Philippines) Joel Songsong | | | | | Quezon City |
| 1988 | (Philippines) Manolito Diaz | | beat | (Philippines) Ding Sumulong | | | | | Quezon City |
| 1989 | (Philippines) Alfredo Sanchez | | beat | (Philippines) Jake Ubaldo | | | | | Quezon City |
| 1990 | (Philippines) Ramon Sabalboro | | beat | (Philippines) Ding Sumulong | | | | | Quezon City |
| 1991 | (Philippines) Alberto-Babet Andrada | | beat | (Philippines) Alfredo Deen | | | | | Quezon City |
| 1992 | (Philippines) Armando Diaz | – | beat | (Philippines) Enrico Flores | – | – | – | – | Manila |
| 1993 | (United States) Ricky Villanueva | – | beat | (Philippines) Alfredo Sanchez | – | – | – | – | Manila |
| 1994 | (Philippines) Tata Paglinawan | – | beat | (Philippines) Conrado Chua | – | – | – | – | Manila |
| 1995 | (United States) Ricky Villanueva (2) | – | beat | (Philippines) Nick Rivera | – | – | – | – | Manila |
| 1996 | (Philippines) Tony Gomez | – | beat | (United States) Nico DePaynos | – | – | – | – | Manila |
| 1997 | (Philippines) Robert Reyes | – | beat | (Philippines) Richie Ebol | – | – | – | – | Manila |
| 1998 | (Philippines) Jerry Flores | – | beat | (Philippines) Enrico Mijares | – | – | – | – | Manila |
| 1999 | (United States) Ricky Villanueva (3) | – | beat | (Philippines) Joseph Domanais | – | – | – | – | Manila |
| 2000 | (Philippines) Wilbert Cuevas | – | beat | (Australia) Tony David | – | – | – | – | Manila |
| 2001 | (Philippines) Celso Parfan | – | beat | (Philippines) Lito Moises | – | – | – | – | Manila |
| 2002 | (Philippines) Benedicto Ybanez | – | beat | (Malaysia) Choon-Peng Lee | – | – | – | – | Manila |
| 2003 | (Philippines) Benedicto Ybanez (2) | – | beat | (Philippines) Enrico Mijares | – | – | – | – | Manila |
| 2004 | (Philippines) Dan Dairocas | – | beat | (Philippines) Rhen Fuentes | – | – | – | – | Manila |
| 2005 | Lourence Ilagan | – | beat | (Philippines) Rolando Andrade | – | PHP 500,000 | PHP 200,000 | PHP 100,000 | Manila |
| 2006 | (Philippines) Robert Calupit | – | beat | Lourence Ilagan | – | PHP 500,000 | PHP 200,000 | PHP 100,000 | Manila |
| 2007 | (Philippines) Ronald Briones | – | beat | Lourence Ilagan | – | PHP 500,000 | PHP 200,000 | PHP 100,000 | Manila |
| 2008 | (Philippines) Ronald Briones (2) | – | beat | (Philippines) Gale Santos | – | PHP 500,000 | PHP 200,000 | PHP 100,000 | Manila |
| 2009 | (Philippines) Benedicto Ybanez (3) | – | beat | (Philippines) Emil Manga | – | PHP 560,000 | PHP 240,000 | PHP 120,000 | Manila |
| 2010 | (Philippines) Jaypee Detablan | – | 6 – 0 | (Philippines) Eduardo Santos | – | PHP 560,000 | PHP 240,000 | PHP 120,000 | Manila |
| 2011 | Lourence Ilagan (2) | – | 5 – 4 | (United Arab Emirates) Alain Abiabi | – | PHP 320,000 | PHP 140,000 | PHP 60,000 | Manila |
| 2018 | Paul Lim | – | 5 – 0 | Kai Fan Leung | – | PHP 2,500,000 | PHP 1,000,000 | PHP 400,000 | Leyte Academic Center, Palo |
| 2019 | Krzysztof Ratajski | – | beat | David Platt | – | PHP 2,800,000 | PHP 1,000,000 | PHP 400,000 | Leyte Academic Center, Palo |
| 2023 | Eduardo Largo | 81.14 | 5 – 4 | Alex Tagarao | 82.25 | PHP 2,800,000 | PHP 1,000,000 | PHP 400,000 | Leyte Academic Center, Palo |
| 2024 | (Philippines) Jhay Doria | – | 7 – 5 | (Philippines) Rolly Gabiana | – | PHP 2,500,000 | PHP 1,000,000 | PHP 400,000 | Winford Resort and Casino, Manila |
| 2025 | | – | | | – | PHP 2,500,000 | PHP 1,000,000 | PHP 400,000 | Winford Resort and Casino, Manila |

=== Women's ===
| Year | Champion | Av. | Score | Runner-Up | Av. | Prize Money | | | Venue |
| Year | Champion | Av. | Score | Runner-Up | Av. | Total | Ch. | R.-Up | Venue |
|---|---|---|---|---|---|---|---|---|---|
| 1992 | (Philippines) Paulita Villanueva | – | beat | | – | – | – | – | Manila |
| 1993 | (Philippines) Paulita Villanueva (2) | – | beat | | – | – | – | – | Manila |
| 1994 | (Philippines) Paulita Villanueva (3) | – | beat | | – | – | – | – | Manila |
| 1995 | (Philippines) Paulita Villanueva (4) | – | beat | | – | – | – | – | Manila |
| 1996 | (Philippines) Paulita Villanueva (5) | – | beat | | – | – | – | – | Manila |
| 1997 | (Philippines) Paulita Villanueva (6) | – | beat | | – | – | – | – | Manila |
| 1998 | (Philippines) Janice Hinojales | – | beat | | – | – | – | – | Manila |
| 1999 | (Philippines) Janice Hinojales (2) | – | beat | | – | – | – | – | Manila |
| 2000 | (New Zealand) Jannette Jonathan | – | beat | (Japan) Yukari Nishikawa | – | – | – | – | Manila |
| 2001 | (Philippines) Janice Hinojales (3) | – | beat | | – | – | – | – | Manila |
| 2002 | (Philippines) Janice Hinojales (4) | – | beat | (Philippines) Edna Granada | – | – | – | – | Manila |
| 2003 | (Philippines) Roselyn Noble | – | beat | (Philippines) Janice Hinojales | – | – | – | – | Manila |
| 2004 | (Philippines) Janice Hinojales (5) | – | beat | | – | – | – | – | Manila |
| 2005 | (Philippines) Roselyn Noble (2) | – | beat | (Philippines) Edna Granada | – | – | – | – | Manila |
| 2006 | (Philippines) Cora Mercado | – | beat | | – | – | – | – | Manila |
| 2007 | (Philippines) Jingle Montebon | – | beat | (Philippines) Lani Tacan | – | – | – | – | Manila |
| 2008 | (Philippines) Analiza Awitan | – | beat | (Philippines) Siony Laluan | – | – | – | – | Manila |
| 2009 | (Philippines) Analiza Awitan (2) | – | beat | | – | – | – | – | Manila |
| 2010 | (Philippines) Analiza Awitan (3) | – | 5 – 4 | (Philippines) Kristine Calderon | – | – | – | – | Manila |
| 2011 | (Philippines) Janice Hinojales (6) | – | 4 – 0 | (Philippines) Ging Ansale | – | – | – | – | Manila |
| 2018 | (Philippines) Lovely Orbeta | – | 4 – 2 | (Philippines) Gracey Pausal | – | PHP 200,000 | PHP 60,000 | PHP 30,000 | Leyte Academic Center, Palo |
| 2019 | (Philippines) Lovely Orbeta (2) | 73.81 | 4 – 1 | (Philippines) Ging Ansale | 59.30 | PHP 200,000 | PHP 60,000 | PHP 30,000 | Leyte Academic Center, Palo |
| 2023 | (Philippines) Mymy Santos | 65.02 | 5 – 1 | (Philippines) Giselle Bulahao | 62.13 | PHP 240,000 | PHP 60,000 | PHP 30,000 | Leyte Academic Center, Palo |
| 2024 | (Philippines) Aileen Oclarit | – | 5 – 3 | (Japan) Yukie Sakaguchi | – | PHP 300,000 | PHP 100,000 | PHP 40,000 | Winford Resort and Casino, Manila |
| 2025 | | – | | | – | PHP 300,000 | PHP 100,000 | PHP 40,000 | Winford Resort and Casino, Manila |
