= Cameron Carolissen =

South African darts player

Personal information
- Nickname: "The Javelin"
- Born: 16 January 1996 (age 30) Cape Town, South Africa
- Home town: Strandfontein, Cape Town, South Africa

Sport
- Sport: Darts
- Playing since: 2008
- Darts: 23g Mission
- Laterality: Right-handed
- Walk-on music: "Ocean Drive" by Duke Dumont

Organisation (see split in darts)
- PDC: 2020–

PDC premier events – best performances
- World Championship: Last 64: 2021

Other tournament wins
- Years
PDC African Qualifier	2020, 2024
African Continental Tour	2023

Cameron Carolissen (born 16 January 1996) is a South African darts player who competes in Professional Darts Corporation (PDC) events. He has made two PDC World Darts Championship appearances and has represented South Africa at the PDC World Cup of Darts.

== Career ==
Carolissen began playing darts at the age of 12; he was inspired by his father and aunt who both played darts regularly.

=== 2021: PDC debut ===
Carolissen qualified for the 2021 PDC World Darts Championship after winning the PDC African Qualifier, beating two-time World Championship participant Charles Losper 7–4 in the final. He received a bye into the second round of the tournament after his opponent Martijn Kleermaker withdrew due to contracting COVID-19. Kleermaker's replacement, Josh Payne, was also ruled out after he had to self-isolate due to coming into contact with someone with COVID-19. In the second round, he was beaten 3–1 by Danny Noppert.

=== 2024–present: African Continental Tour, return to PDC ===
Thanks to his success on the African Continental Tour, Carolissen made his PDC World Cup of Darts debut at the 2024 PDC World Cup of Darts for the South African team, partnering fellow debutant Johan Geldenhuys.

Carolissen qualified for the 2025 PDC World Darts Championship by winning the African Darts Group Qualifier. He overcame Kenya's Peter Wachiuri in the final 8–7 in legs, surviving a match dart for a 154 checkout from Wachiuri. At the World Championship, Carolissen was drawn to play Wessel Nijman, one of the favourites to win the tournament. Nijman took a 2–0 lead but Carolissen won the next two sets to level the match at 2–2. They entered a sudden death leg, where Nijman won the match 3–2. Despite the defeat, Carolissen hoped his performance would help grow interest about darts in Africa.

== World Championship results ==
=== PDC ===
- 2021: Second round (lost to Danny Noppert 1–3)
- 2025: First round (lost to Wessel Nijman 2–3)

== Performance timeline ==
Tournament	2021	2022	2023	2024	2025
PDC Ranked televised events
PDC World Championship	2R	DNQ			1R
PDC Non-ranked televised events
PDC World Cup of Darts	DNP			RR	2R
