= Jarkko Komula =

Finnish darts player

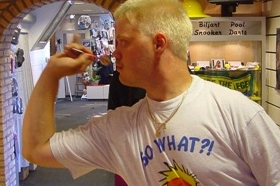
- Komula in 2008

Personal information
- Nickname: "Smiley"
- Born: 13 March 1976 (age 50) Oulu, Finland
- Home town: Tampere, Finland

Sport
- Sport: Darts
- Playing since: 1992
- Darts: 20 Gram Smiley's
- Laterality: Right-handed
- Walk-on music: "Sandstorm" by Darude

Organisation (see split in darts)
- BDO: 1998–2009
- PDC: 2009–2015

WDF major events – best performances
- World Championship: Last 16: 2004
- World Masters: Runner Up: 2001
- World Trophy: Semi Final: 2003
- Int. Darts League: Last 16 Group: 2003, 2004
- Finder Masters: Quarter Final: 2002, 2004

PDC premier events – best performances
- World Championship: Last 32: 2014

Other tournament wins
- Years
Nordic Cup	2008
Norway Open	2003
PDC World Finland Qualifying	2009
WDF World Cup Team	2005
SDC Pro Tour
SDC Denmark	2012, 2013
SDC Finland	2012
SDC Sweden	2014

Jarkko Komula (born 13 March 1976) is a Finnish former professional darts player who played in Professional Darts Corporation (PDC) events. He got the nickname "Smiley" in humorous reference to his lack of smiling.

== Darts career ==
=== BDO ===
Komula reached the final of the 2001 Winmau World Masters, beating Andy Fordham 4–0 in the semi-finals. He was beaten in the final by Raymond van Barneveld. He made his BDO World Championship debut in 2002, losing to Ted Hankey in the first round. He suffered a second first round exit at the Lakeside in 2003, losing to Vincent van der Voort. In the 2004 BDO World Darts Championship, he finally won a match, beating Paul Hanvidge but lost in the second round to Mervyn King. In 2005, he lost in the first round again, this time to Robert Wagner.

On 31 May 2008 Komula won the Nordic Cup, beating Sweden's Markus Korhonen in the final.

=== PDC ===
At the beginning of 2009, Komula joined the PDC. He qualified for the 2010 PDC World Darts Championship by winning the Finland qualifying event. He defeated Russia's Roman Konchikov by 4 legs to 3 in the preliminary round, but lost to Wes Newton by 3 sets to 0 in the first round.

Komula had occasional television appearances for the next few years before coming back to prominence by reaching the semi-finals of the PDC World Cup of Darts in 2013 PDC World Cup of Darts along with his Finnish compatriot Jani Haavisto. Their biggest scalp was the Dutch team of Raymond van Barneveld and Michael van Gerwen, and they also beat the home German team of Andree Welge and Jyhan Artut before being defeated by the Belgian team of Kim Huybrechts and Ronny Huybrechts.

Komula once again qualified for the World Championship in 2014, this time directly into the first round, where he defeated seeded player Mark Walsh 3–1, before losing 4–0 to Simon Whitlock.

Jarkko did not renew his Tour Card for 2015, bringing an end to his PDC run.

== World Championship results ==
=== BDO ===
- 2002: 1st round (lost to Ted Hankey 2–3)
- 2003: 1st round (lost to Vincent van der Voort 1–3)
- 2004: 2nd round (lost to Mervyn King 2–3)
- 2005: 1st round (lost to Robert Wagner 2–3)

=== PDC ===
- 2010: 1st round (lost to Wes Newton 0–3)
- 2013: Last 72 (lost to Jani Haavisto 2–4 legs)
- 2014: 2nd round (lost to Simon Whitlock 0–4)

== Performance timeline ==
Tournament	1999	2000	2001	2002	2003	2004	2005	2006	2007	2008	2009	2010	2011
BDO World Championship	DNQ			1R	1R	2R	1R	DNQ			DNP		
International Darts League	Not held				2R	2R	1R	DNQ		Not Held			
World Darts Trophy	Not held			1R	SF	1R	DNQ			Not held			
Winmau World Masters	QF	SF	RU	L64	L64	L64	DNP	L64	L16	L72	DNP		L40
Finder Darts Masters	DNQ			QF	RR	QF	DNQ	NH	DNQ		DNP		

Performance Table Legend
DNP	Did not play at the event	DNQ	Did not qualify for the event	NYF	Not yet founded	#R	lost in the early rounds of the tournament (WR = Wildcard round, RR = Round robin)
QF	lost in the quarter-finals	SF	lost in the semi-finals	F	lost in the final	W	won the tournament
