= Tony Eccles =

English darts player

Personal information
- Nickname: The Viper
- Born: 8 January 1970 (age 56) Middlesbrough, England
- Home town: Hartlepool, England

Sport
- Sport: Darts
- Playing since: 1990
- Darts: 22g Winmau Signature
- Laterality: Right-handed
- Walk-on music: "Rock This Party (Everybody Dance Now)" by Bob Sinclar

Organisation (see split in darts)
- BDO: 2000–2007, 2012–2014
- PDC: 2007–2012

WDF major events – best performances
- World Championship: Quarter-final: 2007, 2014
- World Masters: Last 32: 2006, 2013
- World Trophy: Quarter-final: 2004
- Int. Darts League: Last 16 Group: 2007
- Finder Masters: Semi-final: 2005
- Dutch Open: Winner (1): 2005

PDC premier events – best performances
- World Championship: Last 16: 2008
- World Matchplay: Last 16: 2008
- World Grand Prix: Last 16: 2008
- UK Open: Last 32: 2010
- Desert Classic: Last 32: 2007
- PC Finals: Last 32: 2009, 2010, 2011

Other tournament wins
- Tournament: Years
- BDO Gold Cup British Classic British Open England Open German Gold Cup Norway Open Scottish Open Swedish Open: 2002; 2013; 2002; 2005; 2007; 2006, 2007; 2012; 2005, 2006

Other achievements
- British Pentathlon 2005; Revesby Workers Club Open 2010; Tyne and Wear Open 2008, 2013

Tony Eccles (born 8 January 1970) is an English former professional darts player and convicted sex offender. Nicknamed The Viper, he played in both the British Darts Organisation (BDO) and the Professional Darts Corporation (PDC). He reached the quarter-finals of the BDO World Darts Championship twice and is a former winner of the Dutch Open, British Open and British Pentathlon.

== Career ==
=== BDO career ===
He made his debut in the World Championship in 2002 but only won one match in his first five visits to Lakeside. Having lost to Wayne Jones (2002), Erik Clarys (2003) and John Walton (2004) he notched his first ever win at the World Championship against Tony David in 2005, before falling to Vincent van der Voort in the second round.

A first round loss again followed to Per Laursen in 2006, but his best run at the event came in 2007 when he progressed to the quarter finals before losing 4–5 to Mervyn King. Tony led King 3–0 but found himself 4–3 down before taking the match into the deciding set, which he lost.

He has had some success in some British Darts Organisation Open events away from the television cameras.

In 2005, he won the Dutch Open, England Open and Sweden Open and in 2006 took the Norway Open and successfully defended his Sweden Open title. He has maintained a high world ranking as a result of these performances, which helped him to be seeded five for the World Championship in 2006 and four in 2007.

In April 2007, he won the Norway Open for the second successive year.

=== PDC career ===
On the eve of the UK Open in June 2007, Eccles announced that he would be switching to compete on the PDC circuit. At the time of his switch he was ranked number 2 in the WDF and number 4 in the BDO world rankings and began his PDC career placed 151st in their Order of Merit. He made his debut to the World Championship in 2008, losing to Adrian Lewis 4–3 in the third round having led 2–0 and missing darts to lead 3–0. In the 2009 PDC World Darts Championship, Eccles, the number 30 seed, faced Dutchman Remco van Eijden. Eccles took a 2–0 lead before van Eijden, who played in the BDO World Darts Championship twelve months previously, came back to level at two sets all before Eccles eventually took the match with a 3–2 win to progress to the second round. He was then beaten by third seed James Wade.

Eccles was seeded 31 for the 2010 PDC World Championship but lost 3–1 in the first round to Brendan Dolan.

=== BDO return ===
After an injury and average performances on the floor, Eccles returned to the BDO circuit in 2012.

Eccles qualified for the 2013 BDO World Championship, winning the first five legs of his first round match against Geert De Vos and missing three darts to win the second set before eventually losing 3–2. The following year, Eccles was drawn against fifth seed Darryl Fitton in the first round and won 3–1. He subsequently beat Wesley Harms 4–3 after surviving a match dart in the sixth set and hitting back-to-back finishes of 80 and 122 to stay in the match before going on to win. Eccles was defeated 5–2 against Robbie Green in the quarter-finals. He announced his retirement from playing professional darts after the 2014 BDO World Darts Championship.

== Child rape trial ==
On 24 June 2014, Eccles was convicted at Teesside Crown Court of five counts of rape and five counts of indecent assault on a schoolgirl. On 26 June, he was sentenced to 16 years in prison. He was released from prison on license, on 1 July 2022, after eight years.

== World Championship performances ==
=== BDO ===
- 2002: 1st round (lost to Wayne Jones 2–3)
- 2003: 1st round (lost to Eric Clarys 1–3)
- 2004: 1st round (lost to John Walton 2–3)
- 2005: 2nd round (lost to Vincent van der Voort 1–3)
- 2006: 1st round (lost to Per Laursen 2–3)
- 2007: Quarter-final (lost to Mervyn King 4–5)
- 2013: 1st round (lost to Geert De Vos 2–3)
- 2014: Quarter-final (lost to Robbie Green 2–5)

=== PDC ===
- 2008: 3rd round (lost to Adrian Lewis 3–4)
- 2009: 2nd round (lost to James Wade 2–4)
- 2010: 1st round (lost to Brendan Dolan 1–3)
- 2011: 1st round (lost to Adrian Lewis 0–3)

== Performance timeline ==
=== BDO ===
Tournament	2000	2001	2002	2003	2004	2005	2006	2007	2008	2009	2010	2011	2012	2013	2014
BDO World Championship	DNQ		1R	1R	1R	2R	1R	QF	PDC					1R	QF
International Darts League	Not held			1R	1R	1R	1R	2R	Not held						
World Darts Trophy	Not held		2R	1R	QF	2R	2R	DNP	Not held						
Winmau World Masters	1R	DNP	3R	2R	2R	3R	4R	PDC					3R	4R	DNQ
Finder Darts Masters	DNQ			RR	RR	SF	NH	PDC					DNQ		

=== PDC ===
Tournament	2007	2008	2009	2010	2011
PDC World Championship	DNP	3R	2R	1R	1R
Las Vegas Desert Classic	1R	DNQ		Not Held	
UK Open	3R	2R	3R	4R	3R
World Matchplay	DNQ	2R	1R	1R	DNQ
World Grand Prix	DNQ	2R	DNQ		
Players Championship Finals	Not held		1R	1R	1R

Key

Performance Table Legend
W	Won the tournament	F	Finalist	SF	Semifinalist	QF	Quarterfinalist	#R; RR; L#	Lost in # round Round-robin; Last # stage	DQ	Disqualified
DNQ	Did not qualify	DNP	Did not participate	WD	Withdrew	NH	Tournament not held	#R; RR; L#	Lost in # round Round-robin; Last # stage	NYF	Not yet founded
