= 2003 Denmark Open darts =

Denmark Open

Tournament information
- Dates: 2003
- Country: Denmark
- Organisation(s): BDO, WDF, DDU

Champion(s)
- (England) Ted Hankey

2003 Denmark Open is a darts tournament, which took place in Denmark in 2003.

== Results ==
| Round | Player |
|---|---|
| Winner | (England) Ted Hankey |
| Final | (England) Tony Eccles |
| Semi-finals | (Netherlands) Raymond van Barneveld |
| Semi-finals | (England) John Walton |
| Quarter-finals | (Scotland) Gary Anderson |
| Quarter-finals | (England) Steve Coote |
| Quarter-finals | (England) Tony O'Shea |
| Quarter-finals | (Denmark) James Christoffersen |
| Last 16 | (England) Martin Adams |
| Last 16 | (England) James Wade |
| Last 16 | (England) Terry Jenkins |
| Last 16 | (England) Lionel Sams |
| Last 16 | (England) Stephen Bunting |
| Last 16 | (Netherlands) Co Stompe |
| Last 16 | (England) Andy Fordham |
| Last 16 | (England) Matt Clark |
