= 2003 BDO World Darts Championship =

Tournament information
- Dates: 4–12 January 2003
- Venue: Lakeside Country Club
- Location: Frimley Green, Surrey
- Country: England, United Kingdom
- Organisation(s): British Darts Organisation
- Format: Sets; Finals: best of 11 (men's) best of 3 (women's)
- Prize fund: £205,000 (men's) £10,000 (women's)
- Winner's share: £50,000 (men's) £4,000 (women's)
- High checkout: 170 Erik Clarys (BEL)

Champion(s)
- Raymond van Barneveld (NED) (men's); Trina Gulliver (ENG) (women's)

The 2003 BDO World Darts Championship (known for sponsorship reasons as the 2003 Embassy World Darts Championship) was a professional darts tournament held from 4 to 12 January 2003 at the Lakeside Country Club in Frimley Green, Surrey. It was the 26th staging of the competition since the 1978 edition and the 18th time it took place at the Lakeside Country Club. The competition was the first of 14 British Darts Organisation (BDO) tournaments in 2003 and featured a women's world championship for the third time. It was broadcast by the BBC in the United Kingdom and was sponsored by the cigarette brand Embassy.

Tony David of Australia was the defending champion heading into the tournament, but he would suffer a whitewash defeat to Wales' Ritchie Davies, five sets to zero (5–0) in the quarterfinals. Two-time world champion Raymond van Barneveld defeated Davies 6–3 in the final. He joined Eric Bristow and John Lowe as the third player to win three or more BDO world titles in their career. Van Barneveld defeated Matt Clark, John Burton, Erik Clarys and Mervyn King en route to the final. Clarys achieved a 170 checkout, the highest of the tournament, in the final set of his quarter-final round match against Van Barneveld. The women's championship was won by Trina Gulliver for the third consecutive year, defeating Dawn Standley, Mieke de Boer and Anne Kirk en route to victory.

== Background ==
=== Men's tournament ===
The British Darts Organisation (BDO) was formed in 1973 by the managing director Olly Croft; the BDO World Darts Championship was first held in 1978. It was one of two world championships in the game of darts: the other being the PDC World Darts Championship. The 2003 tournament was held between 4 and 12 January, in Frimley Green, Surrey, and was the first of 14 BDO-sanctioned events that year. It was the 26th edition of the tournament and featured a 32-player main draw played at the Lakeside Country Club.

A total of 27 players automatically qualified for the main draw with the top 8 seeded according to their final position in the BDO rankings. The tournament's defending champion and world number one Tony David was seeded first and Raymond van Barneveld was seeded second. The remaining five places were decided by an international play-off round held at Bridlington Spa, Bridlington, on 31 October 2002. John Burton, Dennis Harbour. Martin Phillips, Brian Sorensen and Robert Wagner were the five players who progressed from qualifying to the main draw. The maximum number of sets in a match increased from five in the first and second rounds to nine in the quarter- and semi-finals, leading up to the final which was played as best-of-11 frames. Sponsored by the cigarette brand Embassy, it had a total prize fund of £205,000, and was broadcast in the United Kingdom on the BBC.

In the lead up to the 2002 BDO world championship, David was seen by The Times correspondent Mel Webb as the favourite to retain his title due to his performances during the 2002 season. (Note: Eight top seeds John Lowe (1979), Eric Bristow (1981, 1984, 1985 and 1986), Bob Anderson (1988), Phil Taylor (1992) and Van Barneveld (1998 and 1999) had won the competition beforehand.) Conversely, The Racing Post's Steve Davies reported bookmakers considered Van Barneveld the most likely player to win the tournament, which would be his third BDO world championship victory. Embassy Darts guest writer Marcus Stead opined the progress of John Walton, the 2001 champion, would be observed carefully.

=== Women's tournament ===
The BDO women's world championship was the third edition of the tournament, and took place from 4 to 11 January, at the Lakeside Country Club, Frimley Green, Surrey. A total of four players automatically qualified for the main draw and were seeded according to their final position in the BDO rankings. Francis Hoenselaar was seeded first and the competition's defending champion Trina Gulliver was the second seed. Mieke de Boer was seeded third and the final seed was Anne Kirk. Karin Krappen was the only automatic non-seeded participant. The remaining three places were decided by an international play-off round held at Bridlington Spa, Bridlington on 31 October 2002. Linda Rogers-Pickett, Dawn Standley and Gaynor Williams were the trio who advanced from qualifying to the main draw. All matches were played to the best-of-three sets.

== Men's tournament ==
=== First round ===
The draw for the first round of the championship was conducted by Peter Ebdon, the 2002 world snooker champion, and the two-time women's world darts champion Trina Gulliver at Bridlington Spa on 3 November 2002. It was televised live on the BBC sport programme Sunday Grandstand. The first round of the competition, in which 32 players participated, took place from 4 to 6 January and was held as best-of-five sets.

In this round Vincent van der Voort defeated Jarkko Komula 3–1. Komula moved 2–0 ahead in the first set until Van Der Voort produced an 11-dart finish to win set one. Van Der Voort won the game with a 117 checkout. David, who has the blood-clotting disorder haemophilia, lost the first set in his match against Sorensen due to several darts landing outside the board's targets before taking three sets in a row in a 3–1 victory. Against Phillips, Walton claimed set one before Phillips took six successive legs to lead 2–1. Two double one ring finishes gave Walton the fourth set and took the fifth to win 3–2. Walton said he had received treatment for a trapped nerve in his neck before the match. Ritchie Davies, in his seventh consecutive BDO World Championship appearance, defeated Albertino Essers 3–1, a match which saw Davies claim the opening set unchallenged. Gary Anderson defeated Peter Johnstone 3–2 after he converted a 2–0 deficit to win the first set 3–2. Both players twice equalled the game before Anderson took three legs in a row to win. Four-time semi-finalist Andy Fordham compiled high scores and struck the double rings to whitewash Stefan Nagy 3–0.

Bob Taylor progressed past the first round for the second year in a row with a 3–0 whitewash of Peter Hunt from set victories of 3–2 and 3–1×2. In their maiden television appearances, Darryl Fitton defeated Burton 3–1 with set victories of 3–0, 3–2 and 3–1. Martin Adams, the number four seed and England captain, claimed the opening set against Co Stompé. He beat Stompé in the second set and won 3–1 with a 138 checkout. Wagner won the opening set against Gary Robson 3–2. Robson took set two after Wagner missed multiple chances to hit the double ten ring. Wagner took two more sets from six consecutive legs for a 3–1 victory. In the match between Van Barneveld and Matt Clark, the latter began with a maximum before the former took the first set. He then claimed six legs in a row to win 3–1. Erik Clarys defeated the seventh seed Tony Eccles 3–1 after a minor challenge from Eccles in set three. Sub-par play from Shaun Greatbatch saw him whitewashed 3–0 by Colin Monk; Greatbatch was able to force the second set to conclude with a final leg decider before he missed the double rings in the following set.

Sixth seed Tony O'Shea beat Ted Hankey, the 2000 champion, 3–2 in a closely contested match. Hankey won the first set unchallenged before a 118 checkout gave O'Shea the next set. The score was level until O'Shea defeated Hankey on the double 16 ring. Harbour defeated teenager James Wade 3–2. Coming from 2–1 behind Harbour produced checkouts of 145, 115 and 60 in the fifth set to go through to the next round after Wade was unable to convert ten opportunities to win the match. The final first round match was played between the number three seed Mervyn King and Steve Coote. After King compiled a 138 checkout, Coote won the first set 3–2 on a 101 checkout. King moved ahead by winning sets two and three 3–1, and a 116 checkout gave him a 3–1 win.

=== Second round ===
The second round was held from 7 to 8 January. The first second round match, which was played between Adams and Taylor, began with Adams winning the first set on the double 20 ring and led by two legs in set two. A 116 checkout allowed Taylor to tie and then won the third set 3–1. After Adams failed to hit the bullseye ring Taylor won by 3–1. David came from one set behind Van Der Voort early on to win 3–1 with a 114 checkout and a finish of 99 points. He said afterwards: "I was a bit slow coming out in the first set but I picked it up and I'm very happy with how I played." Davies whitewashed Walton 3–0 with two 12-dart finishes and ended on the double 20 ring; Walton missed multiple opportunities to strike a double ring. In the match between Anderson and Fordham, Anderson won the first set on the bullseye ring and Fordham won three legs in a row without reply to level the score. Anderson then claimed the next two sets and finished on the double six ring to win the match 3–1.

Van Barneveld whitewashed Burton 3–0 with a 12-dart finish; Burton won a single leg in each of the three sets played. Clarys came from two legs behind Wagner to win the first set 3–2 and then whitewashed his opponent 3–0. Monk overcame O'Shea 3–2 in a narrowly fought match that the press positively reviewed. Both players tied at 2–2 and the match concluded with a final set decider. The score went to 5–5 when the referee confirmed a sudden death leg, which Monk won with a 102 checkout by striking the treble 20, single 10 and double 16 rings. Monk said post-match he was exhausted and O'Shea praised his opponent's form. The final second round match saw King defeat Harbour 3–1. Two 12-dart finishes and three maximum scores won King set one. King prevented Harbour from winning the second by hitting the double eight ring. Harbour took the third set before King won the match in the fourth.

=== Quarter-finals ===
The four quarter-finals were played to the best-of-nine sets between 9 and 10 January. Davies averaged 32.73 points per dart thrown in whitewashing David 5–0. He won the opening two sets 3–0 and 3–2. Davies further extended his lead through dart throw accuracy and after David could not strike the double 20 ring in the third set. After the mid-session interval, both players tied the fifth set 2–2 until Davies achieved a 121 checkout to win the match. He entered the semi-finals of the championship for the first time in seven attempts. Post-match David said Davies had outperformed him and the latter expressed a surprise over whitewashing his opponent. Another whitewash occurred when Anderson defeated Taylor 5–0 in an all-Scottish fixture. He compiled checkouts of 161 and 140 and a 13-dart finish en route to victory. Anderson commented on his form: "I thought I'd win tonight but I thought it would be a lot closer than that. I was fine against Andy Fordham but I felt a little bit nervous tonight. However, I'm through and I've got nothing to lose."

In the other quarter-finals Van Barneveld achieved a three-dart average of 100.83 and a finish percentage of 59.25 in his 5–1 defeat of Clarys. The match included a tournament-high checkout of 170 from Clarys in the final set. Van Barneveld won the first two sets and Clarys took the third 3–1. Van Barneveld produced a 124 checkout in set four to restore a two set advantage. He took the following two sets 3–0 and 3–2 to qualify for the semi-finals. King whitewashed Monk 5–0 in a repeat of their semi-final game from the 2002 tournament. Both players shared the first four legs of the first set. King hit the double six ring to take a lead he retained for the rest of the game and took the last semi-final spot. He commented on what he needed to defeat Van Barneveld, "I've got to be looking for a 99 to 100 average against Raymond. As you all know, it's not beyond me. But I'm just looking for the win at the end of day, because the Embassy is what you play for."

=== Semi-finals ===
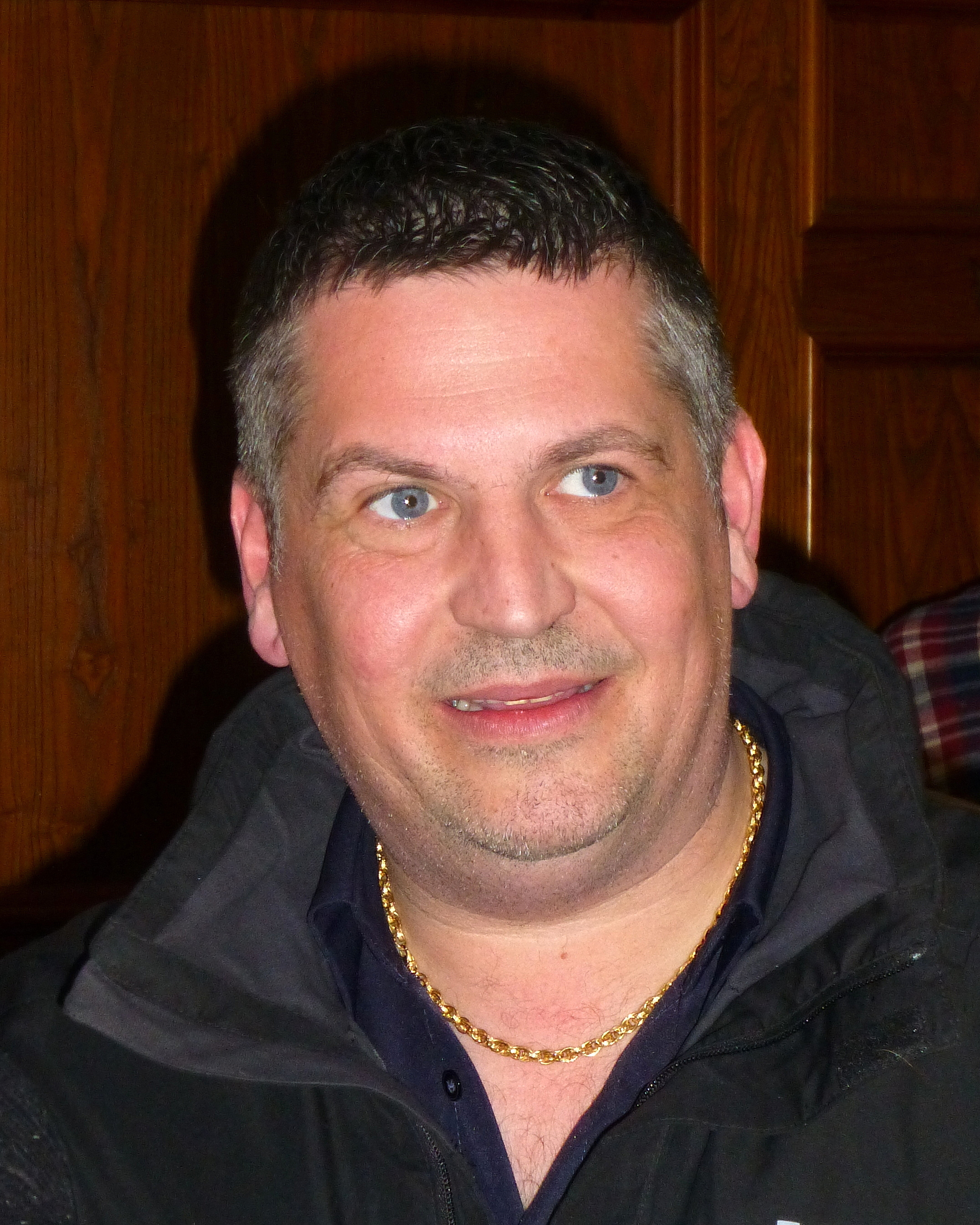
Gary Anderson (pictured in 2016) reached the semi-finals of the tournament.

Both of the semi-finals were played on 11 January. Davies defeated Anderson 5–2 to enter the final. The two players began the match by sharing the first two sets each. Davies subsequently produced a 140 checkout to move in front and he further extended his advantage by winning the fourth set with a finish on the double five ring. After the mid-session interval Anderson won the fifth set. Davies responded by claiming the next set 3–2; a 15-dart finish and Davies finishing on the double ten ring in the eighth set won him the match. Davies said he began slower than before and was eager to participate in the final, "If anyone would have told me at the start of the week that I would be in the final, I'd have laughed. But I've got nothing to lose in this tournament. I've just come here to do as well as I can."

The other semi-final saw Van Barneveld enter the final with a 5–2 defeat of King and requited a loss to his opponent from the 2002 competition. Both players shared the first four legs of the first set which went to a fifth leg won by Van Barneveld on the double eight ring. Van Barneveld produced a 110 checkout to lead by two sets. Both players attempted a nine-dart finish in the first leg of set three: King missed the triple 20 ring and Van Barneveld the triple 19 on his eighth throw. Van Barneveld converted two 12-dart finishes to lead 3–0. King clinched two sets in a row to be 3–2 behind before Van Barneveld struck the double eight ring and made a 161 checkout to win the match. Post-game, King inculpated his defeat on the trajectory of his darts being affected by the activation of an air conditioning system, something the BDO denied. He commented: "Under the conditions, I thought I played exceptionally well – but to beat a player like Raymond, everything has to be right and fair."

=== Final ===
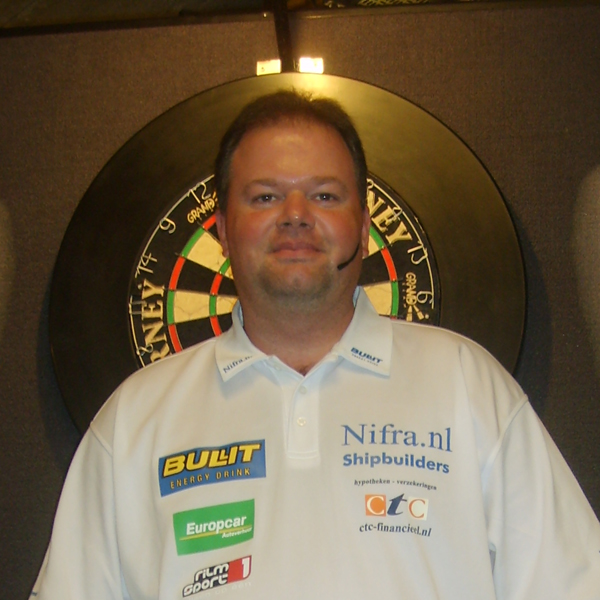
Raymond van Barneveld (pictured in 2006) defeated Ritchie Davies to win his third BDO world championship.

The final played between Davies and Van Barneveld on 12 January was held to the best-of-11 sets. Both players missed hitting the double rings before Van Barneveld produced a 132 checkout completed on the double one ring to take the first set 3–1 after twelve dart throws in leg four. He further extended his lead to 4–0 with three consecutive scores of 3–2 achieved from respective finishes on the double 11 ring in the second set, a 116 checkout in the third and finishing in eleven darts in the final leg of the fourth set. Finishes on the double 16 and 11 rings and a 121 checkout secured Davies the fifth set 3–1 and took set five 3–2. During the seventh set Davies won three successive legs from finishes on the double 20 and 10 rings and a 98 checkout. Van Barneveld won the eighth set 3–2 from two checkouts of 76 points and striking the double 18 ring in its fifth leg. Davies claimed the first leg of set nine after Van Barneveld was unable to convert an 84 finish. Van Barneveld made finishes of 96 and 72 points to win the match 6–3.

Van Barneveld took his third BDO world title after he had won the tournament in 1998 and 1999. He joined Eric Bristow and John Lowe as the third player to win three or more BDO world championships, and earned £50,000 prize money. Van Barneveld commented on the victory: "When you the win the title for the first time it's very good. After 2000 when I lost in the first round I did not believe in myself. I've had to work hard to get on this level again. Mentally, the fight came back in my life and I started to believe in myself again." Davies said he would return to participate at the 2004 event and that the loss of the opening four sets altered his strategy: "I knew with such a long format I had time to settle down but I gave Raymond too many chances. I was very nervous and, at the start, the darts just would not seem to fall the way they have been doing all week. I was trying and trying but Raymond was always coming up with the big score when he needed it. It is hard to play Raymond because once he gets into a rhythm it is very difficult to stop him. I hit too many single 20s tonight which was also disappointing."

== Women's tournament ==
The four quarter-finals of the women's tournament took place between 4 and 5 January. Pre-tournament favourite Hoensellar and Krappen played the first quarter-final match. Krappen took the first set 3–0 before Hoensellar won the match 2–1 with set victories of 3–0 and 3–1. Kirk and Williams tied at 2–2 in the first set of their match before Kirk took the fifth leg to claim it. Kirk then won three legs in a row to whitewash Williams 2–0. Gulliver defeated Standley 2–1. Gulliver won the first set 3–0 before Standley won the next set 3–1. Gulliver completed the victory by winning set three. The final quarter-final match saw De Boer whitewash Rogers-Pickett 2–0; Rogers-Pickett tied the second set 2–2 before De Boer struck the double eight ring to win.

Both of the semi-finals were held on 9 January. Kirk overcame Hoenselaar in the first set and the latter commenced the second by claiming its first leg. Kirk took three consecutive legs to win 2–0 and earned a berth in the final. The other semi-final match saw Gulliver whitewash De Boer 2–0. De Boer took the match's first leg to which Gulliver replied with high scores for three successive leg victories to win the first set. Gulliver took set two to secure the second final spot.

The final was played between Gulliver and Kirk on 11 January. Gulliver took the first leg on the double nine ring and the next two legs to win the first set 3–0. Kirk claimed the first two legs of the second set after Gulliver failed to complete a 121 checkout on the bullseye ring. Gulliver took the next two legs to equal the score and compiled a maximum in the fifth. She won her third BDO world championship by completing a 93 checkout on the double 12 ring. She said of her achievement, "It hasn't really sunk in yet, but when I think about it, I just think wow! It's unbelievable. Mine's still the only name on the trophy and I never want to give it back! I had a lot of pressure on me, admittedly a lot of it I'd put on myself, but I was able to handle it and hold it together."

== Prize fund ==
The breakdown of prize money for 2003 is shown below.

Men's tournament

- Champion: £50,000
- Runner-up: £25,000
- Semi-finalists (×2): £11,000
- Quarter-finalists (×4): £6,000
- Last 16 (×8): £4,250
- Last 32 (×16): £2,750
- Non-qualifiers: £4,000 (shared)
- 9 dart checkout: £52,000
- Highest checkout: £2,000
- Total: £205,000

Women's tournament

- Champion: £4,000
- Runner-up: £2,000
- Semi-finalists (×2): £1,000
- Quarter-finalists (×4): £500
- Non-qualifiers: £600 (shared)
- Total: £10,000

== Draw ==
=== Men's draw ===
Numbers given to the left of players' names show the seedings for the top eight players in the men's tournament. The five qualifiers are indicated by a (Q). The figures in brackets to the right of a competitor's name state their three-dart averages in a match. Players in bold denote match winners.

**First Round** (best of 5 sets)
1	**Tony David** (AUS) (92.70)	**3**
Q	Brian Sorensen (DEN) (84.90)	1
**Vincent van der Voort** (NED) (87.24)	**3**
Jarkko Komula (FIN) (90.96)	1
8	**John Walton** (ENG) (84.09)	**3**
Q	Martin Phillips (WAL) (85.38)	2
**Ritchie Davies** (WAL) (90.00)	**3**
Albertino Essers (NED) (77.97)	1
5	**Andy Fordham** (ENG) (97.21)	**3**
Stefan Nagy (SWE) (86.50)	0
**Gary Anderson** (SCO) (85.65)	**3**
Peter Johnstone (SCO) (86.56)	0
4	**Martin Adams** (ENG) (91.05)	**3**
Co Stompé (NED) (91.38)	1
**Bob Taylor** (SCO) (87.54)	**3**
Peter Hunt (NZL) (83.49)	0
2	**Raymond van Barneveld** (NED) (95.79)	**3**
Matt Clark (ENG) (81.72)	1
Q	**John Burton** (WAL) (87.18)	**3**
Darryl Fitton (ENG) (89.82)	1
7	Tony Eccles (ENG) (82.92)	1
**Erik Clarys** (BEL) (82.59)	**3**
Q	**Robert Wagner** (NOR) (89.31)	**3**
Gary Robson (ENG) (82.05)	1
6	**Tony O'Shea** (ENG) (88.29)	**3**
Ted Hankey (ENG) (88.50)	2
**Colin Monk** (ENG) (90.00)	**3**
Shaun Greatbatch (ENG)(83.13)	0
3	**Mervyn King** (ENG) (91.42)	**3**
Steve Coote (ENG) (87.84)	1
Q	**Dennis Harbour** (ENG) (83.34)	**3**
James Wade (ENG) (83.64)	2

**Second Round** (best of 5 sets)
1	(Australia) **Tony David** (91.39)	**3**
(Netherlands) Vincent van der Voort (88.14)	1
8	(England) John Walton (88.74)	0
(Wales) **Ritchie Davies** (93.36)	**3**
5	(England) Andy Fordham (97.62)	1
(Scotland) **Gary Anderson** (99.48)	**3**
4	(England) Martin Adams (86.76)	1
(Scotland) **Bob Taylor** (87.42)	**3**
2	(Netherlands) **Raymond van Barneveld** (98.01)	**3**
Q	(Wales) John Burton (85.02)	0
(Belgium) **Erik Clarys** (88.47)	**3**
Q	(Norway) Robert Wagner (88.05)	0
6	(England) Tony O'Shea (94.05)	2
(England) **Colin Monk** (97.08)	**3**
3	(England) **Mervyn King** (95.85)	**3**
Q	(England) Dennis Harbour (85.11)	1

**Quarter-Finals** (best of 9 sets)
1	(Australia) Tony David (93.69)	0
(Wales) **Ritchie Davies** (98.19)	**5**
(Scotland) **Gary Anderson** (91.24)	**5**
(Scotland) Bob Taylor (87.49)	0
2	(Netherlands) **Raymond van Barneveld** (100.83)	**5**
(Belgium) Erik Clarys (91.77)	1
(England) Colin Monk (89.70)	0
3	(England) **Mervyn King** (95.82)	**5**

**Semi-finals** (best of 9 sets)
(Wales) **Ritchie Davies** (96.39)	**5**
(Scotland) Gary Anderson (92.85)	2
2	(Netherlands) **Raymond van Barneveld** (98.61)	**5**
3	(England) Mervyn King (92.43)	2

**Final** (best of 11 sets)
(Wales) Ritchie Davies (90.66)	3
2	(Netherlands) **Raymond van Barneveld** (94.86)	**6**

=== Women's draw ===
Numbers given to the left of players' names show the seedings for the top eight players in the women's competition. The three qualifiers are indicated by a (Q). The figures in brackets to the right of a competitor's name state their three-dart averages in a match. Players in bold denote match winners.

Quarter-finals
2	**Trina Gulliver** (ENG) (77.43)	**2**
Q	Dawn Standley (ENG) (65.31)	1
3	**Mieke de Boer** (NED) (68.37)	**2**
Q	Linda Rogers-Pickett (WAL) (61.77)	0
1	**Francis Hoenselaar** (NED) (74.88)	**2**
Karin Krappen (NED) (71.19)	1
4	**Anne Kirk** (SCO) (70.71)	**2**
Q	Gaynor Williams (WAL) (60.99)	0

Semi-finals
2	(England) **Trina Gulliver** (81.03)	**2**
3	(Netherlands) Mieke de Boer (66.54)	0
1	(Netherlands) Francis Hoenselaar (66.54)	0
4	(Scotland) **Anne Kirk** (75.42)	**2**

Final
2	(England) **Trina Gulliver** (84.93)	**2**
4	(Scotland) Anne Kirk (70.20)	0
