= Colin Monk =

English darts player (born 1967)

Personal information
- Nickname: "Mad Monk"
- Born: 29 September 1967 (age 59) Lewisham, London, England
- Home town: Basingstoke, Hampshire, England

Sport
- Sport: Darts
- Playing since: 1985
- Darts: 23g Eigen Ontwerp
- Laterality: Right-handed
- Walk-on music: "I Fought the Law" by The Clash

Organisation (see split in darts)
- BDO: 1993–2004
- PDC: 2004–2011

WDF major events – best performances
- World Championship: Semi-Final: 1998, 2002
- World Masters: Winner (1) 1996
- World Trophy: Quarter-Final: 2003
- Int. Darts League: Last 32 Group: 2003
- Finder Masters: Last 16 Group: 2000, 2001, 2002

PDC premier events – best performances
- World Championship: Last 64: 2006, 2007, 2008, 2010
- World Matchplay: Last 32: 2004
- UK Open: Quarter-Final: 2003
- Desert Classic: Last 32: 2009
- US Open/WSoD: Last 64: 2007

WSDT major events – best performances
- World Masters: Quarter-final: 2022

Other tournament wins
- Tournament: Years
- Denmark Open German Open Norway Open British Open Hampshire Open: 1995; 1996; 1996; 1998; 2003, 2008, 2009

Colin Monk (born 29 September 1967) is an English former professional darts player who played in Professional Darts Corporation (PDC) and British Darts Organisation (BDO) events.

== Career ==
Monk won the Winmau World Masters in 1996, where he beat Richie Burnett 3–2 in the final. Monk's best run in the BDO World Darts Championship came in 1998 and 2002 when he reached the semi-finals, losing to Raymond van Barneveld and Mervyn King respectively. Monk was also part of what is often cited as one of the all-time great matches at Lakeside in 2003 when he defeated Tony O'Shea 3–2 in the Last 16 in a sudden death leg, with Monk's end average being 97.08 to O'Shea's 94.05.

Since joining the PDC full-time in 2004, Monk has struggled for form, losing in the first round of the PDC World Championship in 2006, 2007, 2008 and 2010, failing to win a set in any of those matches. Monk reached the quarter-finals of the 2003 UK Open, a run which included a 9–8 victory over the 2003 PDC World Champion John Part in the Last 16, but Monk was still a BDO/WDF member at the time. Monk's only appearance in the first round at the World Matchplay event in Blackpool in 2004, saw Monk get whitewashed 10–0 by John Part, averaging 59.96.

Monk became a member of the 9 Dart Club when he had a nine dart finish in the Blue Square UK Open in Barnsley during his 6–1 win over Ray Farrell. In the 2010 PDC World Championship, he was drawn against Phil Taylor in the first round and lost three sets to nil.

== Personal life ==
Monk is the father of Arron Monk.

== World Championship results ==
=== BDO ===
- 1994: 2nd round (lost to Steve McCollum 1–3)
- 1995: Quarter-finals (lost to Raymond van Barneveld 2–4)
- 1996: Quarter-finals (lost to Andy Fordham 1–4)
- 1997: 2nd round (lost to Paul Williams 1–3)
- 1998: Semi-finals (lost to Raymond van Barneveld 3–5)
- 1999: Quarter-finals (lost to Andy Fordham 3–5)
- 2000: Quarter-finals (lost to Ronnie Baxter 4–5)
- 2001: 1st round (lost to Marko Pusa 2–3)
- 2002: Semi-finals (lost to Mervyn King 1–5)
- 2003: Quarter-finals (lost to Mervyn King 0–5)
- 2004: 1st round (lost to Ted Hankey 2–3)

=== PDC ===
- 2006: 1st round (lost to Andy Smith 0–3)
- 2007: 1st round (lost to Per Laursen 0–3)
- 2008: 1st round (lost to Denis Ovens 0–3)
- 2010: 1st round (lost to Phil Taylor 0–3)

== Career finals ==
=== BDO major finals: 1 (1 title) ===
Outcome	No.	Year	Championship	Opponent in the final	Score	Ref.
Winner	1.	1996	Winmau World Masters	(Wales) Richie Burnett	3–2 (s)	

== Performance timeline ==
Tournament	1993	1994	1995	1996	1997	1998	1999	2000	2001	2002	2003	2004	2005	2006	2007	2008	2009	2010	2011
BDO World Championship	DNP	L16	QF	QF	L16	SF	QF	QF	L32	SF	QF	L32	No longer a BDO Member						
Winmau World Masters	L16	L32	L32	W	L32	L64	L16	QF	L32	L32	L192	Did not participate							
World Darts Trophy	Not held									L32	QF	DNP				Not held			
International Darts League	Not held										L32G	DNP				Not held			
PDC World Championship	NYF	DNP												L64	L64	L64	DNQ	L64	DNQ
World Matchplay	NYF	DNP										L32	DNQ						
UK Open	Not held										QF	L16	L32	L64	L16	L64	L64	L64	L160
Las Vegas Desert Classic	Not held									DNP							L32	NH	
US Open	Not held														L64	L128	L16	L64	NH
News of the World	Not held				L32	Not held													

Performance Table Legend
DNP	Did not play at the event	DNQ	Did not qualify for the event	NYF	Not yet founded	L#	lost in the early rounds of the tournament (WR = Wildcard round, RR = Round robin)
QF	lost in the quarter-finals	SF	lost in the semi-finals	RU	lost in the final	W	won the tournament
