= Tony David =

Australian darts player

Personal information
- Full name: Anthony David
- Nickname: "The Deadly Boomerang"
- Born: 11 September 1967 (age 59) Townsville, Australia
- Home town: Townsville, Australia

Sport
- Sport: Darts
- Playing since: 1993
- Darts: 23g Formula Sports Tony David
- Laterality: Right-handed
- Walk-on music: "Down Under" by Men at Work

Organisation (see split in darts)
- BDO: 1996–2018
- PDC: 2005

WDF major events – best performances
- World Championship: Winner (1): 2002
- World Masters: Semi-final: 2004
- World Trophy: Winner (1): 2002
- Int. Darts League: Runner-up: 2004
- Finder Masters: Winner (1): 2002

Other tournament wins
- Years
Australian Grand Masters	2002, 2008
Australian Masters	1996, 2000, 2001
French Open	2003
Central Coast Australian Classic	2006
New Zealand Open	2006
Pacific Masters	2003
Medal record
Men's Darts
Representing Australia
WDF Asia-Pacific Cup
Gold medal – first place	2008 Palmertson	Team event
Silver medal – second place	2000 Manila	Team event
Bronze medal – third place	2000 Manila	Men's pairs
Bronze medal – third place	2008 Palmertson	Men's pairs

Tony David (born 11 September 1967) is an Australian former professional darts player, who played under the nickname The Deadly Boomerang. He is the only Australian player to have been a senior singles world darts champion, having won the 2002 Embassy World Championship.

== Career ==
David started playing darts at the age of 25 and progressed into the Queensland State team in 1995. Four years later, he made the Australian WDF World Cup team for the first time.

He made his first trip to the Lakeside Country Club in 2001 to play in the Embassy World Championship, losing to Andy Fordham 0–3 in the first round.

The following year, in 2002, he qualified for his second attempt at the World Championship. Despite being a 66/1 outsider before the tournament began, he went all the way to the final, beating Ritchie Davies, Marko Pusa, Bob Taylor before winning a tight semi-final against Martin Adams 5–4. He was the slight favourite for the title going into the final due to his results, and went on to beat Mervyn King 6–4 in the final. He became the first Australian player to win a World Professional Darts Championship.

Later in 2002, he won the World Darts Trophy in the Netherlands, one of the British Darts Organisation's other Grand Slam titles. Also in 2002, David won the Australian Grand Masters and the Doeland Grand Masters to cap off a superb year. David also reached the semi-finals of the World Darts Trophy in 2003 and 2004, losing both times to Raymond van Barneveld. David also lost to Barneveld in the final of the International Darts League in 2004.

David went into the 2003 World Championship at the Lakeside as the number 1 seed and pre-tournament favourite after his 2002 successes. The defence of his world title started creditably as he defeated Brian Sorensen and Vincent van der Voort in his first two matches, but ended with a surprising 0–5 loss at the quarter-final stage to Ritchie Davies of Wales. After that defeat, David has failed to win another match at the Lakeside event. He went out in the first round in 2004 to Darryl Fitton and in 2005 to Tony Eccles. He failed to qualify for the 2006 or 2007 events. He returned to Lakeside in 2008 but lost in the first round to Gary Robson.

In February 2005, David was one of the four BDO players who competed at the prestigious 2005 Masters of Darts, against four PDC players. Of the four matches that David played at the event, he won 2 and lost 2. He defeated Wayne Mardle 4–2 in sets in his opening match, lost 0–4 in sets to reigning PDC World Champion Phil Taylor in his second match, lost 3–4 in sets to reigning UK Open champion Roland Scholten in his third match, and then won his fourth match against the reigning World Grand Prix champion, Colin Lloyd, by 4–3 in sets. Despite his two victories, David failed to progress to the semi-finals, with Andy Fordham and Raymond van Barneveld progressing to the semi-finals from the BDO group, as David was eliminated. Phil Taylor eventually won the tournament.

== Health problems ==
David has haemophilia, which requires regular medication. On top of this, his throwing action is slightly limited by the condition, as he cannot bring his arm back as far as most players due to bleeding in his elbow during childhood causing crystallization in the elbow.

On 21 February 2009, David was rushed to hospital to undergo an emergency liver transplant due to complications with interferon/ribuviron treatment. The transplant was a successful one, and David has recovered well, although he has been unable to fully return to darts.

On 7 December, David was rushed into hospital for an operation on his spleen. The operation was deemed to be a success. David's close friend Allan Summers said on BDOforums.co.uk that he is "improving day by day from his latest operation; however, it would be some time before he would be allowed back home to continue his ongoing treatment".

== Personal life ==
David married his long-time partner, Natalie Carter, on 20 November 2010. They divorced in March 2018.

== World Championship Results ==
=== BDO ===
- 2001: 1st round (lost to Andy Fordham 0–3) (sets)
- 2002: Winner (beat Mervyn King 6–4)
- 2003: Quarter-final (lost to Ritchie Davies 0–5)
- 2004: 1st round (lost to Darryl Fitton 2–3)
- 2005: 1st round (lost to Tony Eccles 2–3)
- 2008: 1st round (lost to Gary Robson 1–3)

== Career finals ==
=== BDO major finals: 4 (3 titles) ===
Legend
World Championship (1–0)
World Darts Trophy (1–0)
Zuiderduin Masters (1–0)
International Darts League (0–1)

Outcome	No.	Year	Championship	Opponent in the final	Score (Note: (l) = score in legs, (s) = score in sets.)
Winner	1.	2002	World Championship	(England) Mervyn King	6–4 (s)
Winner	2.	2002	World Darts Trophy	(England) Tony O'Shea	6–0 (s)
Winner	3.	2002	Zuiderduin Masters	(England) Mervyn King	6–4 (s)
Runner-up	1.	2004	International Darts League	(Netherlands) Raymond van Barneveld	5–13 (s)

== Performance timeline ==
Tournament	2000	2001	2002	2003	2004	2005	2006	2007	2008
BDO World Championship	DNP	1R	W	QF	1R	1R	DNQ		1R
International Darts League	Not held			QF	RU	RR	DNQ		NH
World Darts Trophy	Not held		W	SF	SF	1R	DNQ		NH
Winmau World Masters	4R	2R	2R	3R	SF	3R	3R	DNP	
Zuiderduin Masters	DNP		W	RR	DNQ				
Masters of Darts	Not held					RR	NH	DNP	NH

Performance Table Legend
W	Won the tournament	F	Finalist	SF	Semifinalist	QF	Quarterfinalist	#R; RR; L#	Lost in # round Round-robin; Last # stage	DQ	Disqualified
DNQ	Did not qualify	DNP	Did not participate	WD	Withdrew	NH	Tournament not held	#R; RR; L#	Lost in # round Round-robin; Last # stage	NYF	Not yet founded
