= 2002 BDO World Darts Championship =

Darts tournament

Tournament information
- Dates: 5–13 January 2002
- Venue: Lakeside Country Club
- Location: Frimley Green, Surrey
- Country: England, United Kingdom
- Organisation(s): British Darts Organisation
- Format: Sets; Finals: best of 11 (men's) best of 3 (women's)
- Prize fund: £197,000 (men's) £8,300 (women's)
- Winner's share: £48,000 (men's) £4,000 (women's)
- High checkout: 170 Mervyn King (ENG)

Champion(s)
- Tony David (AUS) (men's); Trina Gulliver (ENG) (women's)

The 2002 BDO World Darts Championship (known for sponsorship reasons as the 2002 Embassy World Darts Championship) was a professional darts tournament held from 5 to 13 January 2002 at the Lakeside Country Club in Frimley Green, Surrey, England. It was the 25th staging of the competition since the 1978 edition and the 17th time it took place at the Lakeside Country Club. The tournament was the first of 12 British Darts Organisation (BDO) tournaments in 2002 and a women's world championship was held for the second time. The host broadcaster was the BBC and the competition was sponsored by the cigarette brand Embassy.

Tony David defeated Mervyn King six sets to four in the final. He was the first Australian to win the BDO world championship and the first non-European to do so since John Part. David defeated Ritchie Davies, Marko Pusa, Bob Taylor and the England captain Martin Adams en route to the final. King achieved a 170 checkout, the highest of the competition, in the third leg of the third set of his second round match against Mensur Suljović. The women's tournament was won by Trina Gulliver for the second consecutive year, defeating Mandy Solomons, Vicky Pruim and Francis Hoenselaar en route to victory.

== Background ==
=== Men's tournament ===
The British Darts Organisation (BDO) was formed in 1973 by the managing director Olly Croft; the BDO World Darts Championship was first held in 1978. It was one of two world championships in the game of darts: the other being the PDC World Darts Championship. The 2002 tournament was held between 5 and 13 January in Frimley Green, Surrey, England and was the first of 12 BDO-sanctioned events that year. It was the 25th anniversary edition of the tournament and featured a 32-player main draw played at the Lakeside Country Club.

A total of 27 players automatically qualified for the main draw with the top 8 seeded according to their final position in the BDO rankings. The tournament's defending champion and world number one John Walton was seeded first and the second seed was Martin Adams, the England captain. The five qualifying places were decided via a play-off round at the Lakeside Country Club on 29 November 2001. John Ferrell, two-time finalist Bobby George, Markus Korhohen, Davy Richardson and Mensur Suljović were the five players from a worldwide field of 300 who progressed to the main draw by qualifying. The maximum number of sets played in a match increased from five in the first and second rounds to nine in the quarter and semi-finals, leading to the final which was played as best-of-11 sets. Sponsored by the cigarette brand Embassy, it had a total prize fund of £197,000 and was broadcast in the United Kingdom on the BBC and SBS6 in the Netherlands.

The media considered Walton and the fifth seed Raymond van Barneveld the favourites to win the championship. There was some controversy prior to the competition when six qualifying players—1996 champion Steve Beaton, two-time finalist Ronnie Baxter, Andy Jenkins, Chris Mason, Kevin Painter and Paul Williams—opted to play in the rival Professional Darts Corporation (PDC) world championship instead. Olly Croft insisted the absent players would not be missed, but the head of BBC darts disagreed, stating: "You can't just replace recognisable people with unknowns and say it is the same and that nothing has changed." (Note: Peter Manley, a PDC player, had accumulated enough points to qualify for the BDO tournament before he committed to partaking in the PDC competition.) This allowed Peter Johnstone, Wayne Jones, Stefan Nagy, Russell Stewart and Andree Welge to take their places.

=== Women's tournament ===
The BDO confirmed in November 2001 the women's world championship would be held for a second time. The governing body expanded the tournament's roster from four players in 2001 to eight in 2002 after receiving positive feedback from its sponsors and the BBC. The tournament was staged between 5 and 12 January 2002. Four players automatically qualified for the main draw and were seeded according to their final position in the BDO rankings. The competition's defending champion Trina Gulliver was seeded first. Francis Hoenselaar was the second seed and Crissy Howat was seeded third. The final seed was Vicky Pruim. The remaining four places were decided via a play-off round held at the Lakeside Country Club on 30 November 2001. Stacy Bromberg, Sandra Greatbatch, Jan Robbins and Mandy Solomon were the quartet of players who advanced from qualifying to the main draw. All matches were played to the best-of-three sets.

== Men's tournament ==
=== First round ===
The draw for the first round of the championship was made at the Lakeside Country Club by Leighton Rees, the 1978 world champion, and the women's world champion Trina Gulliver on 2 December 2001, on the day of the final of the 2001 World Masters. It was broadcast live on the BBC sport programme Sunday Grandstand. The first round of the competition, in which 32 players participated, took place from 5 to 7 January and was held to the best-of-five sets.

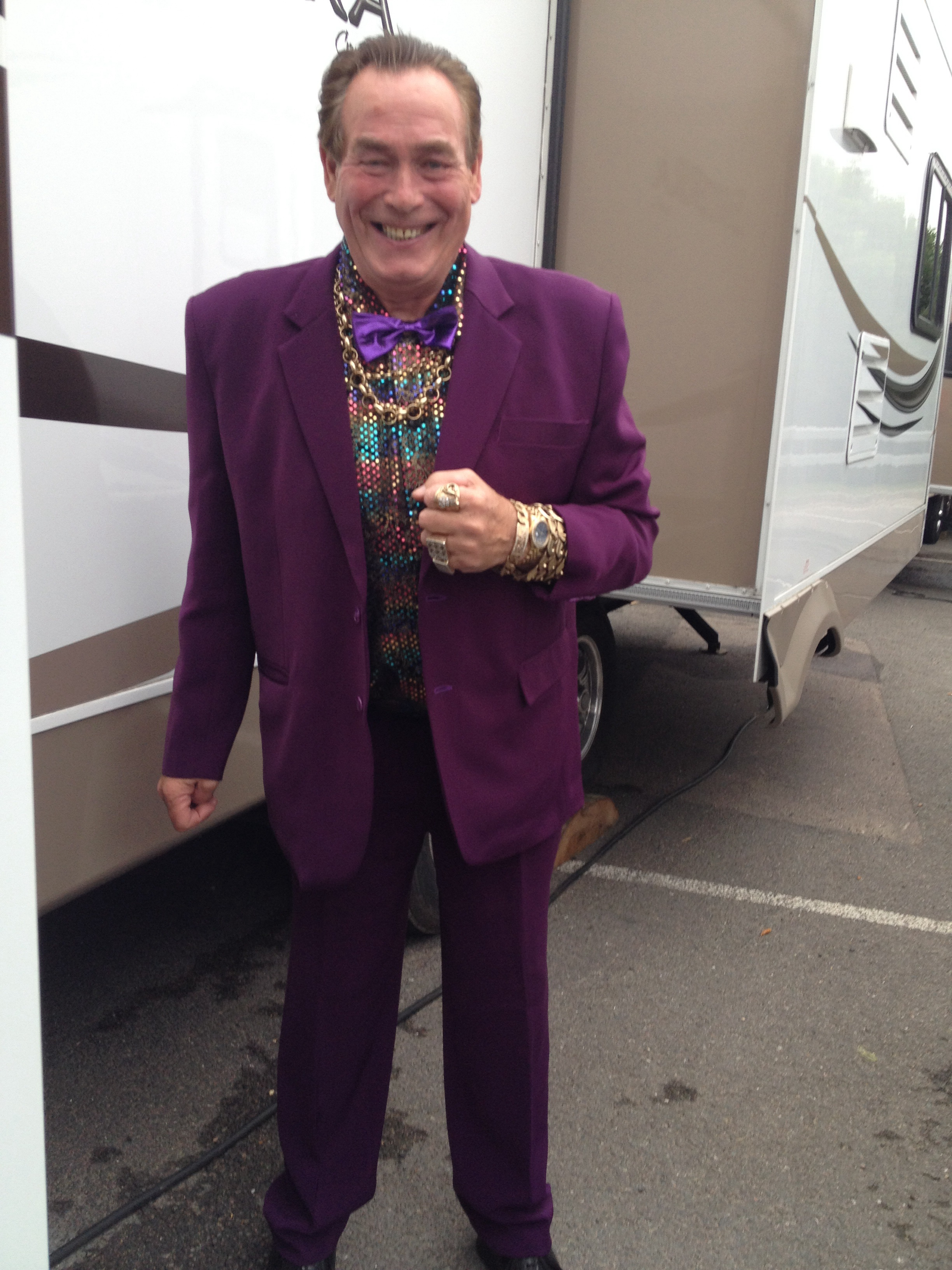
Bobby George (pictured in 2014) was eliminated by Raymond van Barneveld in the first round of the championship.

In this round Walton whitewashed the four-time semi-finalist Andy Fordham 3–0. Walton led 1–0 before Fordham took a solitary leg in the second set. He then claimed the third set to eliminate Fordham in the first round for the first time in his eighth appearance in the tournament. The 1998 tournament semi-finalist Colin Monk overcame Tony O'Shea 3–2. Monk was two legs behind when he won three in a row to claim the first set. O'Shea won three consecutive legs for the second set and level the score before Monk won the third to go 2–1 ahead. O'Shea forced a final set decider that Monk won after O'Shea missed five attempts on a double ring. Gary Anderson won with scorelines of 3–1 in the first two sets against Nagy and whitewashed him 3–0 in the third set. Van Barneveld defeated George 3–1 to stop the latter from becoming the tournament's oldest winner aged 57. He began with a maximum en route to claiming the first and second sets. George had a failed attempt at a nine-dart finish in the third set. He recovered to claim the set after five legs. George led the fourth set before Van Barneveld won the match.

Eighth seed Wayne Mardle completed a 3–0 whitewash of Richardson 3–0 in the fifth leg of the third set. Welge and Erik Clarys tied 1–1 before the latter won a low-scoring third set. A 141 checkout from Welge elongated the match until Clarys hit the double eight and four rings to win 3–1. Vincent van der Voort led 1–0 over Suljović, who took sets two and three. Suljović attempted a nine-dart finish in set four until he missed the treble 17 ring. He then took the following two legs before Van Der Voort forced a final set decider that Suljović won for a 3–2 victory. Fourth seed Mervyn King defeated Stewart 3–1; King twisted his left knee as he retrieved his darts from the board after the first set. He played with a limp for the rest of the game and sought treatment afterwards. Korhohen, the youngest player in the competition's history at 18 years and 50 days, lost 3–1 to Steve Coote from scores of 3–1 and 3–2 in sets two and three.

Adams compiled scores of 3–0 and 3–1 to lead 2–0 over Johnstone. He completed a 3–0 whitewash after defeating Johnstone 3–2 in the third set. Ted Hankey, the 2000 champion and seventh seed, defeated Jarkko Komula 3–2. Both players equalled the score and forced the game to enter a final set decider that Hankey won 3–0. Afterwards Komula said he was annoyed because he was not informed of tournament organisers moving the game's start time by two hours to allow it to be televised. Jones twice recovered from being one set behind Tony Eccles to win 3–2. Mike Veitch, who participated in the competition for the first time since the 1990 edition, was whitewashed 3–0 by Co Stompé after protracted play. Sixth seed Bob Taylor progressed to the second round for the first time since the 1994 championship with a 3–0 victory over Ferrell with a match-winning 102 checkout.

Tony David, who has the blood-clotting disorder haemophilia which prevents him from straightening his throwing arm, beat Ritchie Davies, the tournament's sole Welsh player, 3–1. Davies led 1–0 early on and David won the next three sets to enter the next round. The final first round match was played between third seed Marko Pusa and Matt Clark. Pusa took the first set 3–1 and won the second unchallenged. Clark claimed set three 3–0 before Pusa took the fourth set to complete a 3–1 victory.

=== Second round ===
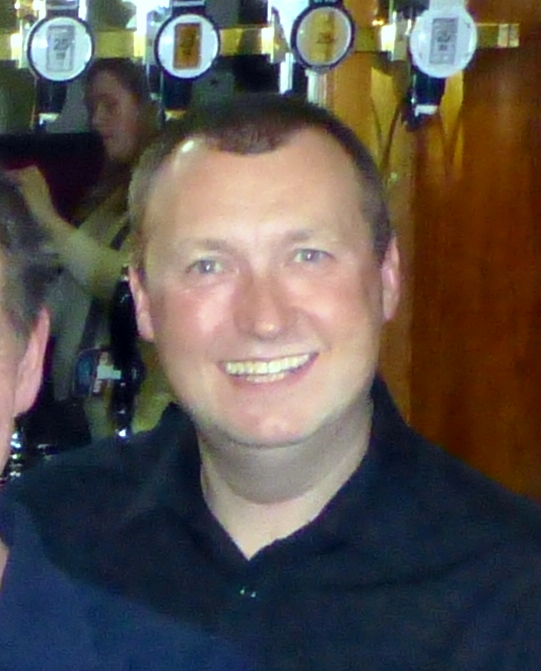
Wayne Mardle (pictured in 2016) reached the quarter-finals by defeating Davy Richardson and Stefan Nagy.

The second round was held from 8 to 9 January. Van Barneveld took 21 minutes to whitewash Clarys 3–0 and was the first player to reach the quarter-finals; he lost two legs to Clarys. Monk won 3–2 over Walton. His opponent claimed the first set before Monk secured the following two sets to lead 2–1. Walton drew level with Monk 2–2 after his opponent missed the double 18 ring in the fourth set's final leg. This caused the match to conclude with a final set decider, which Monk won 3–2 to progress to the second round after a 116 checkout and a double 10 finish. Walton said afterwards he was uncertain whether the strain of attempting to win the tournament for a second time or a minor repetitive strain injury on his wrists contributed to his loss against Monk.

Nagy won the first set against Mardle. It appeared he would take the second when the score was 2–2 before Mardle equalled the scoreline. Mardle subsequently entered the quarter-finals with a 3–1 victory. King compiled the tournament's maximum checkout of 170 in the third leg of the third set of his match between Suljović and a 161 finish. Suljović won the first set before King won three in a row to secure a 3–1 victory. Hankey won the first two sets without a challenge from Jones, who took sets three and four from checkouts of 121 and 80. Hankey commenced the final set with a maximum score in the first leg before Jones took the following three legs to win by 3–2.

The second round's sixth match was contested by Taylor and Stompé. Taylor won the first set 3–2. He then missed achieving a 138 checkout and allowed Stompé to complete a 135 checkout and tie at 1–1. Three maximum scores and a dart landing in the double 10 ring put Taylor ahead. He took the fourth set to win 3–1. Adams lost the first set to Coote before he secured the next two with scores of 3–1. Both players levelled the score at 2–2 in the fourth set before Adams attained his only maximum score of the game to win 3–1. In the final match of the second round David played Pusa. David used Pusa's low scoring performance to win the first two sets. Pusa claimed the third set 3–2 and was unable to replicate this performance; David won all three legs of the third set for a 3–1 victory.

=== Quarter-finals ===
The four quarter-finals were played to the best-of-nine sets between 10 and 11 January. Monk, who treated his match against Mardle as the final, won 5–4 in a closely contested game. Monk took a 4–1 lead before Mardle replied by winning twelve consecutive legs to level the score at 4–4 and required the game to conclude with a ninth set. Monk took the deciding frame to enter the semi-finals, saying afterwards, "At 4–1 I was thinking it was happy days, but next thing I had the world on my shoulders. My arm was shaking and my knees rattling – I was worn out." Later that day, in a match that saw 27 maximum scores, King led Van Barneveld 2–0 with scores of 3–1 in the first two sets. Van Barneveld took the third set 3–1; a 160 checkout and a maximum score put King 3–1 in front. He compiled a 156 checkout before King won the fifth set. After a dart thrown by Van Barneveld missed the bullseye ring in an attempt to achieve a 170 checkout, he took the following two sets. Before Van Barneveld could force a final set decider King completed a 131 checkout to win 5–3.

Adams defeated Jones 5–1 to reach the semi-finals of the tournament for the first time since the 1995 edition. He moved 2–0 in front, which included a 121 checkout. Jones claimed the third set to be one set behind. Adams restored his lead by another two sets. During set six Jones threw four darts at striking a double ring while 2–1 behind Adams to which his opponent responded with a double top finish to complete a victory. Against Taylor, David went 2–0 behind until he won the match's third set with a finish on the double 16 ring. He lost a closely contested fifth and sixth sets to Taylor before David forced a final set decider with victories in the next two sets. The final set went to a fourth leg after Taylor could not complete checkouts of 116 and 125. David claimed a 5–4 win with a finish on the double ten ring on his final dart throw. David's victory allowed him to become the first Australian to reach the semi-finals of the BDO world championship.

=== Semi-finals ===
Both of the semi-finals were played on 12 January. The first semi-final was played between King and Monk. Both players had been at this stage of the event before; King was defeated 5–3 by Les Wallace in the 1997 tournament and Monk lost to Van Barneveld in the 1998 competition. King won a tightly contested first set after he could not complete a 170 checkout. Monk subsequently defeated King 3–2 in the following set. King made checkouts of 116 and 153 to lead 3–1 at the mid-session interval. A 121 checkout and two maximum scores from King increased his lead over Monk to 4–1. He then achieved another maximum score and hit the double four ring to win 5–1 and become the first player to earn a berth in the final.

The second semi-final was held between Adams and David. Adams took the opening set 3–0 and David commenced the second set by winning its first leg. Adams equalled the second set 2–2 by David hit the double ten leg on his second attempt to claim the set. David won the following three sets to go 4–1 ahead and put himself requiring another set to enter the final. Afterwards, Adams clinched three consecutive legs to win set six. He then compiled checkouts of 158 and 121 to equal the score at 4–4 and end the match with a ninth set. David led the final set 2–1 before Adams forced a final leg decider. David won two legs on a tie-break and struck the double 20 ring after Adams missed two opportunities to hit the double 16 ring to claim a 5–4 victory and progress to the final.

=== Final ===
The final played between David and King on 13 January was held to the best-of-11 sets. During the match, which took place before a crowd of 1,200 spectators, an 81 checkout and a 12-dart finish won David the first set 3–2 after King's dart did not strike the double 20 ring in leg four. King took the second set 3–1 when David missed three dart throws to the double 10 ring. David responded to claim the following four sets to put himself within a solitary set of claiming the championship. The next three sets were claimed by King with a checkout of 161 and respective finishes on the double four and double eight rings; David had missed three chances of finishing the match early after nine sets on the double 20 ring. During the tenth set both players equalled the scoreline before David successfully threw a dart on the double 18 ring to hold a 2–1 advantage. After King was unable to attain scoring opportunities David hit the single 20 section, and missed his first attempt to hit the double 10 ring when a dart landed outside the board. He hit the double 10 ring on the second attempt to win the match 6–4 and the tournament.

I started to feel like Goran Ivanišević must have done when he won Wimbledon last summer. The cheering was incredible and I was getting sackloads of messages and emails. The support of the other players and the BDO in particular also means a great deal to me. There is no way that I would play my darts other than within the BDO/WDF system. I am proud to be the Embassy World Champion in the 25th Anniversary year of this great competition, and I promise that I will enjoy myself throughout the year before returning to Lakeside in 2003.

— Tony David talking about the reception he received after winning the tournament.

David became the first Australian to win the BDO world championship, and the first non-European player to do so since Canadian, John Part. He won £48,000 for his success, saying, "It was unbelievable. When I was younger I had a dream. I dreamt that I would win three competitions. The first was the Townsville Open, which I won a few days later. The second was the Australian Open in Geelong, which took me two or three years. And the last was the Embassy World Professional championship. And now I've done it." King said David deserved to win the tournament, "Believe me, this man is a very, very worthy champ", and added, "He just bashed me up."

The press reviewed the match positively and David was called "The People's Champion" in a similar fashion to Alex Higgins in snooker. Jon Wilde of The Independent and The Guardian's Ian Malin noted David had become "one of the game's most unlikely heroes" by winning the tournament due to his blood-clotting disorder that caused him to spend a majority of his early years hospitalised and doctors told his parents it was unlikely he would reach his teenage years. Bruce Wilson writing for the Herald Sun called David's victory "a true Cinderella story" because he was ranked 18th in the world and considered a 66–1 outsider. Bobby George, writing in his BBC Sport online column, agreed David deserved to win and criticised King's performance in the final.

== Women's tournament ==
All four of the quarter-finals of the women's tournament took place on 5 January and ended in 2–0 whitewashes. In a rematch of the 2001 final, tournament favourite Gulliver played Solomons. Gulliver won all of the match's legs to become the first player through to the semi-finals. Pruim overcame a challenge from Robbins in the second quarter-final match. World number two Hoenselaar averaged 26.14 points per dart and accurately threw darts on the double rings en route to defeating Bromberg. The final quarter-final saw Greatbatch defeat 2001 semi-finalist Howat after overcoming a challenge from her opponent to equal the score at 2–2 in the second set.

In the semi-finals, held between 10 and 11 January, Gulliver defeated Pruim 2–1. Pruim won the match's first three legs to take a 1–0 lead. Gulliver then won the second set and equalled the final set decider 2–2 by throwing darts on the single 20 and double 20 rings before winning the match to enter the final. The other semi-final saw Hoenselaar overhaul Greatbatch 2–1. Hoenselaar was unchallenged early on and claimed the first set. Hoenselaar threw 35 darts to claim the victory as Greatbatch could not initiate a response.

The final was played between Gulliver and Hoenselaar on 12 January. Hoenselaar began with a first set victory of 3–1 before Gulliver claimed the second set by the same scoreline. Both players equalled the third set's score 2–2. The final leg of the concluding set saw Hoenselaar take an early lead; she had to score 130 points and Gulliver 114 points. Gulliver compiled 60 points and finished on the double 20 ring to win the second BDO women's world championship. After the match, Gulliver said, "I'm over the moon. To win it once and go back and successfully defend it is beyond my wildest dreams. It was hard this time and there was an extra round, with eight players starting instead of the four last year", and, "Everyone wants the title and with me being the number one seed and defending champion there was a lot of pressure."

== Prize fund ==
The breakdown of prize money for 2002 is shown below.

Men's tournament

- Winner: £48,000
- Runner-up: £24,000
- Semi-Finalists (×2): £10,500
- Quarter-Finalists (×4): £5,500
- Last 16 (×8): £4,000
- Last 32 (×16): £2,650
- 9 Dart Checkout: £52,000
- Highest checkout: £2,000
- Non-qualifiers: £5,400 (shared)
- Total: £197,000

Women's tournament

- Winner £4,000
- Runner-up: £2,000
- Semi-Finalists (×2): £1,000
- Quarter-Finalists (×4): £0
- Non-qualifiers: £300 (shared)
- Total: £8,300

== Draw ==
=== Men's draw ===
Numbers given to the left of players' names show the seedings for the top eight players in the men's tournament. The five qualifiers are indicated by a (Q). The figures in brackets to the right of a competitor's name state their three-dart averages in a match. Players in bold denote match winners.

**First Round** (best of 5 sets)
1	**John Walton** (ENG) (86.97)	**3**
Andy Fordham (ENG) (86.34)	0
**Colin Monk** (ENG) (87.36)	**3**
Tony O'Shea (ENG) (85.92)	2
8	**Wayne Mardle** (ENG) (97.11)	**3**
Q	Davy Richardson (ENG) (83.88)	0
**Stefan Nagy** (SWE) (84.24)	**3**
Gary Anderson (SCO) (81.69)	0
5	**Raymond van Barneveld** (NED) (100.83)	**3**
Q	Bobby George (ENG) (90.51)	1
**Erik Clarys** (BEL) (81.87)	**3**
Andree Welge (GER) (73.53)	1
4	**Mervyn King** (ENG) (83.76)	**3**
Russell Stewart (AUS) (78.21)	1
Q	**Mensur Suljović** (AUT) (87.15)	**3**
Vincent van der Voort (NED) (87.03)	2
2	**Martin Adams** (ENG) (85.32)	**3**
Peter Johnstone (SCO) (79.71)	0
**Steve Coote** (ENG) (89.10)	**3**
Q	Markus Korhonen (SWE) (82.71)	1
7	**Ted Hankey** (ENG) (89.49)	**3**
Jarkko Komula (FIN) (88.20)	2
**Wayne Jones** (ENG) (89.91)	**3**
Tony Eccles (ENG) (86.52)	2
6	**Bob Taylor** (SCO) (82.68)	**3**
Q	John Ferrell (ENG) (81.42)	0
**Co Stompé** (NED) (93.45)	**3**
Mike Veitch (SCO) (82.50)	0
3	**Marko Pusa** (FIN) (87.00)	**3**
Matt Clark (ENG) (88.98)	1
**Tony David** (AUS) (91.29)	**3**
Ritchie Davies (WAL) (86.85)	1

**Second Round** (best of 5 sets)
1	(England) John Walton (94.77)	2
(England) **Colin Monk** (94.23)	**3**
8	(England) **Wayne Mardle** (91.92)	**3**
(Sweden) Stefan Nagy (88.50)	1
5	(Netherlands) **Raymond van Barneveld** (100.71)	**3**
(Belgium) Erik Clarys (94.05)	0
4	(England) **Mervyn King** (94.50)	**3**
Q	(Austria) Mensur Suljović (85.84)	1
2	(England) **Martin Adams** (94.59)	**3**
(England) Steve Coote (92.40)	1
7	(England) Ted Hankey (88.68)	2
(England) **Wayne Jones** (90.06)	**3**
6	(Scotland) **Bob Taylor** (94.29)	**3**
(Netherlands) Co Stompé (91.44)	1
3	(Finland) Marko Pusa (86.49)	1
(Australia) **Tony David** (96.24)	**3**

**Quarter-Finals** (best of 9 sets)
(England) **Colin Monk** (93.87)	**5**
8	(England) Wayne Mardle (93.24)	4
5	(Netherlands) Raymond van Barneveld (101.10)	3
4	(England) **Mervyn King** (101.67)	**5**
2	(England) **Martin Adams** (101.28)	**5**
(England) Wayne Jones (92.73)	1
6	(Scotland) Bob Taylor (92.94)	4
(Australia) **Tony David** (92.85)	**5**

**Semi-finals** (best of 9 sets)
(England) Colin Monk (88.71)	1
4	(England) **Mervyn King** (96.75)	**5**
2	(England) Martin Adams (98.58)	4
(Australia) **Tony David** (99.09)	**5**

**Final** (best of 11 sets)
4	(England) Mervyn King (89.67)	4
(Australia) **Tony David** (93.57)	**6**

=== Women's draw ===
Numbers given to the left of players' names show the seedings for the top four players in the women's competition. The four qualifiers are indicated by a (Q). The figures in brackets to the right of a competitor's name state their three-dart averages in a match. Players in bold denote match winners.

Quarter-finals
1	**Trina Gulliver** (ENG) (86.70)	**2**
Q	Mandy Solomons (ENG) (70.38)	0
4	Jan Robbins (WAL) (61.26)	**0**
Q	**Vicky Pruim** (BEL) (64.74)	2
2	**Francis Hoenselaar** (NED) (78.42)	**2**
Q	Stacy Bromberg (USA) (71.19)	0
3	Crissy Howat (ENG) (61.74)	**0**
Q	**Sandra Greatbatch** (WAL) (63.60)	2

Semi-finals
1	(England) **Trina Gulliver** (77.10)	**2**
Q	(Belgium) Vicky Pruim (67.95)	1
2	(Netherlands) **Francis Hoenselaar** (69.33)	**2**
Q	(Wales) Sandra Greatbatch (64.98)	1

Final
1	(England) **Trina Gulliver** (84.36)	**2**
2	(Netherlands) Francis Hoenselaar (82.95)	1
