= 2004 BDO World Darts Championship =

Tournament information
- Dates: 3–11 January 2004
- Venue: Lakeside Country Club
- Location: Frimley Green, Surrey
- Country: England, United Kingdom
- Organisation(s): BDO
- Format: Sets; Finals: best of 11 (men's) best of 3 (women's)
- Prize fund: £201,000
- Winner's share: £50,000
- High checkout: 161 (Wales) Ritchie Davies

Champion(s)
- (England) Andy Fordham

The 2004 BDO World Darts Championship (known for sponsorship reasons as the 2004 Lakeside World Darts Championship) was the first World Darts Championship held after Imperial Tobacco were forced to withdraw their sponsorship. UK government legislation had banned tobacco companies from attaching their brands to sporting events from 2003.

The tournament had been previously known as the Embassy World Championship for 26 years since its inception in 1978. Bob Potter, owner of the Lakeside Country Club which hosts the event, stepped in to become the new title sponsor of the event. The prize fund for 2004 matched the previous year, with the exception of the non-qualifiers payments which were removed.

The championship was staged between 3–11 January. Andy Fordham became a new name on the trophy after defeating defending champion, Raymond van Barneveld in the semi-final and Mervyn King in the final. Fordham hit the highest 3-dart average in the final (97.18) since the PDC/BDO split in 1993 - although Phil Taylor and Eric Bristow had each surpassed that figure twice in their previous BDO title wins.

== Prize money ==
The prize money was £201,000 for the men's event and £10,000 for the women's event.

Men's Champion: £50,000
Runner-Up: £25,000
Semi-Finalists (2): £11,000
Quarter-Finalists (4): £6,000
Last 16 (8): £4,250
Last 32 (16): £2,750

There was also a shared 9 Dart Checkout prize of £51,000, along with a High Checkout prize of £2,000 per event.

== Seeds ==
Men

1. (Netherlands) Raymond van Barneveld
2. (England) Ted Hankey
3. (England) Mervyn King
4. (Australia) Tony David
5. (England) Tony West
6. (England) Martin Adams
7. (Scotland) Gary Anderson
8. (England) John Walton

== The Results ==
=== Men ===
Players in bold denote match winners.

**First Round** (best of 5 sets)
1	(Netherlands) **Raymond van Barneveld** (91.65)	**3**
(New Zealand) Peter Hunt (82.08)	1
(England) **Paul Hogan** (83.10)	**3**
(Scotland) Bob Taylor (77.43)	0
8	(England) **John Walton** (86.19)	**3**
(England) Tony Eccles (82.38)	2
(Norway) **Robert Wagner** (86.58)	**3**
(Netherlands) Co Stompé (84.27)	2
5	(England) **Tony West** (92.31)	**3**
(England) Mick Reed (86.34)	1
(England) **Andy Fordham** (92.04)	**3**
(England) Brian Derbyshire (85.17)	0
4	(Australia) Tony David (82.26)	2
(England) **Darryl Fitton** (85.47)	**3**
(England) **James Wade** (82.11)	**3**
(England) Shaun Greatbatch (80.88)	0
2	(England) **Ted Hankey** (91.98)	**3**
(England) Colin Monk (85.50)	2
(England) **Stephen Bunting** (79.68)	**3**
(Netherlands) Vincent van der Voort (81.69)	2
7	(Scotland) Gary Anderson (85.47)	0
(England) **Tony O'Shea** (88.29)	**3**
(England) **Gary Robson** (87.27)	**3**
(England) Steve Coote (86.10)	2
6	(England) Martin Adams (91.59)	2
(Wales) **Ritchie Davies** (91.95)	**3**
(Australia) **Steve Duke** (78.63)	**3**
(Netherlands) Albertino Essers (77.25)	1
3	(England) **Mervyn King** (87.42)	**3**
(Netherlands) Rick Hofstra (79.08)	1
(Finland) **Jarkko Komula** (86.28)	**3**
(Scotland) Paul Hanvidge (84.30)	2

**Second Round** (best of 5 sets)
1	(Netherlands) **Raymond van Barneveld** (98.64)	**3**
(England) Paul Hogan (89.79)	1
8	(England) **John Walton** (86.07)	**3**
(Norway) Robert Wagner (86.16)	1
5	(England) Tony West (89.28)	0
(England) **Andy Fordham** (93.75)	**3**
(England) **Darryl Fitton** (95.64)	**3**
(England) James Wade (88.56)	1
2	(England) **Ted Hankey** (92.22)	**3**
(England) Stephen Bunting (81.36)	0
(England) **Tony O'Shea** (96.33)	**3**
(England) Gary Robson (93.48)	2
(Wales) **Ritchie Davies** (96.66)	**3**
(Australia) Steve Duke (96.84)	2
3	(England) **Mervyn King** (89.49)	**3**
(Finland) Jarkko Komula (87.42)	2

**Quarter-Finals** (best of 9 sets)
1	(Netherlands) **Raymond van Barneveld** (103.80)	**5**
8	(England) John Walton (92.76)	1
(England) **Andy Fordham** (93.57)	**5**
(England) Darryl Fitton (93.84)	4
2	(England) Ted Hankey (93.51)	1
(England) **Tony O'Shea** (94.92)	**5**
(Wales) Ritchie Davies (97.05)	4
3	(England) **Mervyn King** (92.98)	**5**

**Semi-Finals** (best of 9 sets)
1	(Netherlands) Raymond van Barneveld (97.71)	4
(England) **Andy Fordham** (97.68)	**5**
(England) Tony O'Shea (90.60)	1
3	(England) **Mervyn King** (93.48)	**5**

**Final** (best of 11 sets)
(England) **Andy Fordham** (97.18)	**6**
3	(England) Mervyn King (90.13)	3

Embassy World Darts Championship

Tournament information
- Dates: 3–11 January 2004
- Venue: Lakeside Country Club
- Location: Frimley Green, Surrey
- Country: England, United Kingdom
- Organisation(s): BDO
- Format: Sets; Finals: best of 3 (women's)
- Prize fund: £10,000
- Winner's share: £4,000

Champion(s)
- (England) Trina Gulliver

== Seeds ==
Women

1. (England) Trina Gulliver
2. (Netherlands) Francis Hoenselaar
3. (England) Claire Bywaters
4. (Netherlands) Karin Krappen

== Prize money ==
The prize money was £10,000 for the women's event.

Women's Champion: £4,000
Runner-Up: £2,000
Semi-Finalists (2): £1,000
Quarter-Finalists (4): £500

== The Results ==
=== Women ===
Players in bold denote match winners.

Quarter-Finals
1	(England) **Trina Gulliver** (84.60)	**2**
(England) Barbara Lee (66.36)	0
4	(Netherlands) **Karin Krappen** (79.29)	**2**
(Scotland) Anne Kirk (69.09)	0
2	(Netherlands) **Francis Hoenselaar** (75.51)	**2**
(Netherlands) Mieke de Boer (69.66)	0
3	(England) **Clare Bywaters** (75.51)	**2**
(Sweden) Carina Ekberg (73.29)	0

Semi-Finals
1	(England) **Trina Gulliver** (90.24)	**2**
4	(Netherlands) Karin Krappen (82.50)	0
2	(Netherlands) **Francis Hoenselaar** (82.20)	**2**
3	(England) Clare Bywaters (79.56)	1

Final
1	(England) **Trina Gulliver** (89.49)	**2**
2	(Netherlands) Francis Hoenselaar (85.44)	0
