= Gary Robson (darts player) =

English darts player

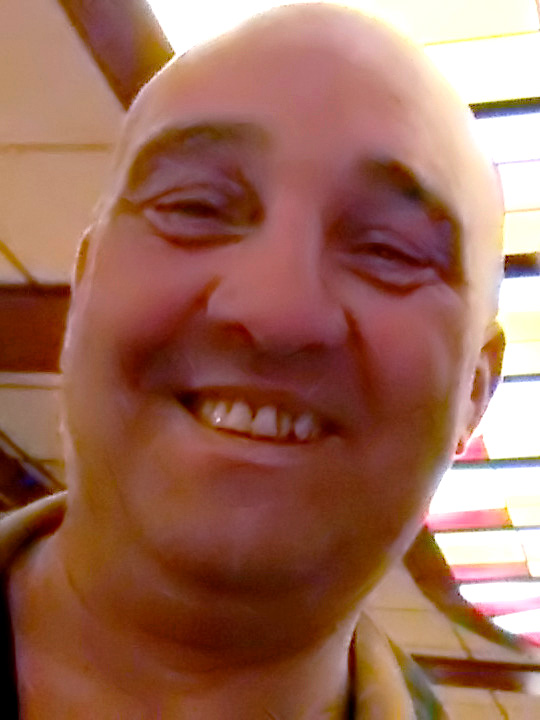
- Robson in 2015

Personal information
- Nickname: "Big Robbo"
- Born: 19 June 1967 (age 59) Cramlington, England
- Home town: Rothbury, England

Sport
- Sport: Darts
- Playing since: 1984
- Darts: 22g Gary Robson g force darts
- Laterality: Right-handed
- Walk-on music: "Follow the Leader" by The Soca Boys

Organisation (see split in darts)
- BDO: 1995–2020
- WDF: 1995–
- Current world ranking: (WDF) NR (17 August 2026)

WDF major events – best performances
- World Championship: Quarter Final: 2007, 2009, 2011
- World Masters: Quarter Final: 2005, 2011, 2014, 2018
- World Trophy: Winner (1): 2005
- Int. Darts League: Quarter Final: 2007
- Finder Masters: Runner Up: 2014

PDC premier events – best performances
- Grand Slam: Group Stage: 2018

Other tournament wins
- Tournament: Years
- England Masters England National Ch'ships England Open Granite City Open Isle of Man Open Police Masters Scottish Open: 2014; 2011, 2016; 2011; 2013; 2007; 2012; 2024

Other achievements
- 2011 Garioch Masters; 2010, 2011 Tyne and Wear Open; 2009 West Brabant Open

Gary "Big Robbo" Robson (born 19 June 1967) is an English professional darts player who plays in World Darts Federation events.

== Career ==
Robson qualified twice for the World Championships, but was beaten in the first round on each occasion. He made it for a third time in 2004, but found himself 2–0 down in sets against Steve Coote. However, Robson recovered and took the match to a sudden death deciding leg, which he won. Robson then lost to Tony O'Shea in the second round.

Robson's biggest tournament win so far was at the World Darts Trophy in Utrecht, Netherlands. He beat Mervyn King 6–4 in the 2005 final.

Robson had to wait until 2007 to win another match at the World Championship, but his opponent for that match was pre-tournament favourite Michael van Gerwen. Robson won 3–2. Robson did not have to wait long for his next win, as he made the quarter-finals for the first time in his career with a 4–3 win over former champion John Walton, having been 3–1 down. Robson could have had a nine-dart leg, but missed his seventh treble. However, his run was ended by Dutchman Niels de Ruiter. Robson led 2–0 and 4–2 but ended up losing 5–4.

Robson returned to the World Championship in 2008 where he was drawn against 2002 World Champion, Tony David. This was Robson's only win at the 2008 World Championship, as in the second round he came up against Darryl Fitton. Fitton averaged over 100 in a 4–0 victory.

In the 2009 World Championship, Robson reached the quarter-final for the second time, beating Stephen Bunting and Martin Atkins before losing to Martin Adams. 2009 was not a good year for Robson as a whole and as a result, he was forced to qualify for the 2010 Lakeside World Championship.

Robson lost 3–0 in a first round clash with 2009 champion and 5th seed Ted Hankey at the 2010 BDO World Championship. The next year, Robson was seeded once more and advanced through to the quarter-finals for a third time by defeating Steve Douglas and Dave Chisnall for the loss of just one set. He then led Martin Phillips 3–1 but was defeated 5–4.

Robson was knocked out of the 2012 World Championships in the first round losing 3–0 to Steve Douglas. In 2013, he lost in the first round to Garry Thompson.

=== PDC ===
He competed for a tour card at the 2020 Q school in an attempt to join the Professional Darts Corporation, however he finished 164th and failed to win a tour card.

== World Championship results ==
=== BDO ===
- 2001: 1st round (lost to Raymond van Barneveld 1–3)
- 2003: 1st round (lost to Robert Wagner 1–3)
- 2004: 2nd round (lost to Tony O'Shea 2–3)
- 2005: 1st round (lost to Darryl Fitton 1–3)
- 2006: 1st round (lost to Gary Anderson 1–3)
- 2007: Quarter-finals (lost to Niels de Ruiter 4–5)
- 2008: 2nd round (lost to Darryl Fitton 0–4)
- 2009: Quarter-finals (lost to Martin Adams 4–5)
- 2010: 1st round (lost to Ted Hankey 0–3)
- 2011: Quarter-finals (lost to Martin Phillips 4–5)
- 2012: 1st round (lost to Steve Douglas 0–3)
- 2013: 1st round (lost to Garry Thompson 1–3)
- 2014: 2nd round (lost to Robbie Green 1–4)
- 2015: 2nd round (lost to Jeff Smith 3–4)
- 2016: 1st round (lost to Madars Razma 1–3)
- 2018: 1st round (lost to Glen Durrant 0–3)
- 2019: 1st round (lost to David Cameron 1–3)
- 2020: 1st round (lost to Ben Hazel 2–3)

== Career finals ==
=== BDO major finals: 2 (1 title, 1 runner-up) ===
Outcome	No.	Year	Championship	Opponent in the final	Score (Note: (l) = score in legs, (s) = score in sets.)
Winner	1.	2005	World Darts Trophy	(England) Mervyn King	6–4 (s)
Runner-up	1.	2014	Zuiderduin Masters	(England) Jamie Hughes	0–5 (s)

== Performance timeline ==
Tournament	1995	1996	1997	1998	1999	2000	2001	2002	2003	2004	2005	2006	2007	2008	2009	2010	2011	2012	2013	2014	2015	2016	2017	2018	2019	2020
BDO World Championship	DNQ						1R	DNQ	1R	2R	1R	1R	QF	2R	QF	1R	QF	1R	1R	2R	2R	1R	DNQ	1R	1R	1R
BDO World Trophy	Not held																			SF	2R	DNQ		1R	1R	NH
International Darts League	Not held								RR	RR	RR	RR	QF	Not held												
World Darts Trophy	Not held							DNQ	QF	2R	W	1R	RR	Not held												
Winmau World Masters	1R	DNQ					2R	DNQ	1R	1R	QF	3R	6R	6R	5R	5R	QF	6R	6R	QF	5R	4R	4R	QF	DNQ	NH
Finder Darts Masters	Not held					DNP				RR	RR	NH	SF	QF	SF	QF	RR	DNP	QF	F	RR	DNP			NH	
Grand Slam of Darts	Not held												DNQ											RR	DNQ	

Key

Performance Table Legend
W	Won the tournament	F	Finalist	SF	Semifinalist	QF	Quarterfinalist	#R; RR; L#	Lost in # round Round-robin; Last # stage	DQ	Disqualified
DNQ	Did not qualify	DNP	Did not participate	WD	Withdrew	NH	Tournament not held	#R; RR; L#	Lost in # round Round-robin; Last # stage	NYF	Not yet founded
