= John Walton (darts player) =

English darts player (born 1961)

Personal information
- Full name: John Michael Walton
- Nickname: "John Boy"
- Born: 10 November 1961 (age 64) Bradford, Yorkshire, England
- Home town: Sheffield, Yorkshire, England

Sport
- Sport: Darts
- Playing since: 1970/71
- Darts: 18g (handmade)
- Laterality: Right-handed
- Walk-on music: "Cotton Eye Joe" by Rednex preceded opening from "Layla" by Derek and the Dominos

Organisation (see split in darts)
- BDO: 1993–2014, 2015–2016, 2018–2019
- PDC: 2015
- WDF: 2020

WDF major events – best performances
- World Championship: Winner(1): 2001
- World Masters: Winner(1) 2000
- World Trophy: Quarter-final: 2005
- Int. Darts League: Last 16: 2005
- Finder Masters: Quarter-final: 2004

WSDT major events – best performances
- World Championship: Quarter-final: 2022

Other tournament wins
- Years
Belgium Open	2001
British Classic	2001
British Open	2001
British Pentathlon	2002, 2006, 2010
England Masters	2002, 2010, 2011
Flanders Open	2009
IDPA Portland Masters	2001
Scottish Open	2001
Six Nations Cup	2010
WDF Europe Cup Pairs	2008
WDF Europe Cup Team	2004
WDF World Cup Pairs	2001
WDF World Cup Team	1999, 2001, 2007
Welsh Open	2000
Malta Open	2014

John Michael Walton (born 10 November 1961) is an English former professional darts player who competed in World Darts Federation (WDF) events. He is best known for winning the 2001 BDO World Darts Championship. He adopted the nickname John Boy and used the song "Cotton Eye Joe" by Rednex as his walk-on theme.

== BDO career ==
=== 1993–2000: Early career ===
Walton picked up some small tournament victories in the early stages of his career, including the Websters 150 Championship in 1993 and the Highlands Open Championship in 1996 but didn't manage to qualify for the World Championship until 1999 when he lost 0–3 to Roland Scholten on his first round debut. He failed to qualify for the World Championship in 2000, but in the autumn of that year he won the prestigious Winmau World Masters. Despite that success, he was 50/1 with the bookmakers to win the World title in the New Year, and his Masters form possibly led to him being tipped by darts pundit Bobby George at the start of the BBC televised coverage as a possible winner.

=== 2001–05: World title ===
Walton opened his 2001 campaign with a 3–1 first round win over Ritchie Davies and averaged an excellent 100.62 during the match. He then beat Mervyn King 3–0 with another high average of 99.00. His quarter-final was a 5–0 whitewash over Marko Pusa, in which Walton won 14 consecutive legs. Walton then beat Wayne Mardle 5–3 in the semi-final and Ted Hankey 6–2 in the final to become World Champion. This also made him one of only a few players to have held both the Winmau World Masters and World Championship simultaneously. He joined Eric Bristow, Phil Taylor, Richie Burnett and Bob Anderson as the fourth player to win them in the same season. Martin Adams and Stephen Bunting have since joined this elite group of players.

Walton's defence of his Lakeside title in 2002 ended with a second round loss to Colin Monk and he went out in the second round to Davies in 2003. He reached the 2004 quarter-finals, but lost 1–5 to Raymond van Barneveld. In 2005 he lost to Darryl Fitton in the second round and he was knocked out by Stephen Roberts in 2006. Another second round defeat, this time to Gary Robson followed in 2007, and in 2008 he lost in the first round to the then-reigning Winmau World Masters champion Robert Thornton. He hasn't won any of the major open events since his successful year in 2001 when he took the British Open, British Classic, Belgium Open, Scottish Open and Portland Open.

=== 2007–14 ===
Walton made history at the 2007 Winmau World Masters in Bridlington by hitting a televised nine dart finish. It was the first time a player had hit a nine-darter in the televised stages in the 34-year history of the event (Chris Mason achieved one in the preliminary round a few years previously), and was the first on BBC television since Paul Lim's historic World Championship feat in 1990. Walton's 2008 campaign was hampered by a shoulder injury but despite sliding down the world rankings, he entered the 2009 BDO World Championship as the number 15 seed. He won through an emotional first-round game against his friend Shaun Greatbatch who was battling bone marrow cancer. He then caused a major shock by beating defending champion Mark Webster 4–0 in the second round. He then played Hankey in the quarter-final, a repeat of the 2001 Embassy Final which Walton won. Hankey avenged the earlier loss with a 5–1 win, and went on to win the championship. On 24 May 2009, Walton hit another 9 darter at the Antwerp Open in the final against Drik Beni. The 9 darter came in the third leg and he went on to win the game 4–0, only to go out the next round to Joey ten Berge in the last 32. In the 2010 Six Nations Cup tournament held in Sligo. Walton representing England, hit his third 9 darter against Dave Smith-Hayes of Wales. This rare achievement in a single leg format of the team event has, as yet, not been equalled. Walton was unseeded for the 2011 World Championship, but beat 16th seed Dave Prins 3–1 in the first round before being defeated by Martin Adams 4–3 in a sudden death leg. The match has already been touted as one of the best in the tournament's history. In 2011 season, he retained the English Masters beating Ross Montgomery in the final. Walton failed to qualify for the 2014 BDO World Darts Championship, the first time since 2000 he did not appear at the event.

=== 2015–18 ===
Walton lost the Malta Open 2015 final in November 2015 against Ümit Uygunsözlü. Walton qualified for the 2016 BDO World Championship, but did not enter many events after 2016. He did qualify for the TV stages of the 2018 World Masters, beating Martin Adams and Andy Hamilton in the floor stages before losing 3-1 to Glen Durrant in the last-32.

=== World Seniors Darts Championship ===
Walton made a return to the TV Screens by playing in the Inaugural World Seniors Darts Championship, He beat fellow World Champions Les Wallace 3-2 and John Part 3-1 In the opening two rounds, before losing in the quarter final to Terry Jenkins 3-1.

Walton also competed in the Modus Super Series and Live League in 2022.

== PDC career ==
In January 2015, Walton joined the rival PDC by entering the PDC Qualifying School in an attempt to win a tour card. He was unsuccessful in doing so having failed to finish in the top 18 of the Q School Order of Merit.

== World Championship results ==
=== BDO ===
- 1999: 1st round (lost to Roland Scholten 0–3) (sets)
- 2001: Winner (beat Ted Hankey 6–2)
- 2002: 2nd round (lost to Colin Monk 2–3)
- 2003: 2nd round (lost to Ritchie Davies 0–3)
- 2004: Quarter-final (lost to Raymond van Barneveld 1–5)
- 2005: 2nd round (lost to Darryl Fitton 0–3)
- 2006: 1st round (lost to Stephen Roberts 0–3)
- 2007: 2nd round (lost to Gary Robson 3–4)
- 2008: 1st round (lost to Robert Thornton 0–3)
- 2009: Quarter-final (lost to Ted Hankey 1–5)
- 2010: 1st round (lost to Willy van de Wiel 2–3)
- 2011: 2nd round (lost to Martin Adams 3–4)
- 2012: 1st round (lost to Martin Atkins 1–3)
- 2013: 1st round (lost to Tony O'Shea 0–3)
- 2016: 1st round (lost to Brian Dawson 2–3)

=== WSDT ===
- 2022: Quarter-finals (lost to Terry Jenkins 1–3)

== Career finals ==
=== BDO major finals: 2 (2 titles) ===
Legend
World Championship (1–0)
Winmau World Masters (1–0)

Outcome	No.	Year	Championship	Opponent in the final	Score (Note: (l) = score in legs, (s) = score in sets.)
Winner	1.	2000	Winmau World Masters	(England) Mervyn King	3–2 (s)
Winner	2.	2001	World Championship	(England) Ted Hankey	6–2 (s)

== Performance timeline ==
Tournament	1995	1996	1997	1998	1999	2000	2001	2002	2003	2004	2005	2006	2007	2008	2009	2010	2011	2012	2013	2014	2015	2016	2017	2018
BDO World Championship	DNQ				1R	DNQ	W	2R	2R	QF	2R	1R	2R	1R	QF	1R	2R	1R	1R	DNQ		1R	DNQ	
International Darts League	Not held								RR	RR	2R	RR	DNP	Not held										
World Darts Trophy	Not held							2R	2R	1R	QF	2R	1R	Not held										
Winmau World Masters	DNQ	3R	DNQ	2R	4R	W	4R	2R	QF	4R	QF	QF	SF	5R	3R	5R	6R	5R	2R	3R	2R	PR	DNQ	5R
Zuiderduin Masters	Not held					DNQ		RR	RR	QF	RR	NH	RR	DNQ	RR	RR	RR	RR	DNQ					

Performance Table Legend
DNP	Did not play at the event	DNQ	Did not qualify for the event	NYF	Not yet founded	#R	lost in the early rounds of the tournament (WR = Wildcard round, RR = Round robin)
QF	lost in the quarter-finals	SF	lost in the semi-finals	F	lost in the final	W	won the tournament

== Nine-dart finishes ==
John Walton televised nine-dart finishes
Date	Opponent	Tournament	Method	Prize
17 November 2007	(Wales) Martin Phillips	World Masters	3 x T20; 3 x T20; T20, T19, D12	£2,000
