= 2005 Masters of Darts =

Tournament information
- Dates: 7 – 13 February 2005
- Venue: ExpoCenter
- Location: Hengelo
- Country: Netherlands
- Organisation(s): PDC/BDO
- Format: Sets; Final – best of 13
- Prize fund: €395,000
- Winner's share: €150,000

Champion(s)
- Phil Taylor

The 2005 Masters of Darts was a unique darts tournament as it was the first televised confrontation between the darts players of the two rival organisations, the British Darts Organisation (BDO) and the Professional Darts Corporation (PDC). There had been two "champion versus champion" matches held, but this tournament was the first major event featuring players from each organisation.

This inaugural Masters of Darts took place between 7 and 13 February 13 2005 at the ExpoCenter in Hengelo, The Netherlands. The best four players from both federations were invited. The tournament was arranged by PenH Events, who managed to secure a three-year contract with Raymond van Barneveld, a BDO player at the time, taking part in the tournament. The host broadcaster was RTL5 in the Netherlands, who had also secured a three-year deal to broadcast the event. However, the tournament was not held in 2006 and by the time it was revived for 2007, SBS6 took over as Dutch broadcasters for the event.

== Prize Fund ==
Total prize money for the event was €395,000 with the tournament winner securing €150,000 making it one of the richest prizes in darts.

== Results ==
- Day 1
  - Co Stompé 4 - Colin Lloyd 0
  - Raymond van Barneveld 4 - Roland Scholten 2
  - Andy Fordham 4 - Wayne Mardle 2
- Day 2
  - Tony David 4 - Wayne Mardle 2
  - Andy Fordham 2 - Phil Taylor 4
  - Co Stompé 1 - Roland Scholten 4
- Day 3
  - Tony David 0 - Phil Taylor 4
  - Andy Fordham 4 - Roland Scholten 2
  - Raymond van Barneveld 4 - Colin Lloyd 0
  - Co Stompé 4 - Wayne Mardle 1
- Day 4
  - Andy Fordham 4 - Colin Lloyd 1
  - Raymond van Barneveld 0 - Phil Taylor 4
  - Roland Scholten 4 - Tony David 3
- Day 5
  - Tony David 4 - Colin Lloyd 3
  - Raymond van Barneveld 4 - Wayne Mardle 3
  - Co Stompé 0 - Phil Taylor 4

=== Standings ===
PDC Group

Rnk	Name	Won	Lost	Sets Won	Sets Lost
1	Phil Taylor	4	0	16	2
2	Roland Scholten	2	2	12	12
3	Wayne Mardle	0	4	8	16
4	Colin Lloyd	0	4	4	16

BDO Group

Rank	Name	Won	Lost	Sets Won	Sets Lost
1	Andy Fordham	3	1	14	9
2	Raymond van Barneveld	3	1	12	9
3	Co Stompé	2	2	9	9
4	Tony David	2	2	11	13

=== Knockout stage ===
- Semi-finals
  - Raymond van Barneveld 2 - Phil Taylor 5
  - Andy Fordham 5 - Roland Scholten 1
- Final
  - Andy Fordham 1 - Phil Taylor 7

== See also ==
- Masters of Darts history of the tournament
