= Masters of Darts =

Tournament information
- Venue: ExpoCenter
- Location: Hengelo
- Country: Netherlands
- Established: 2005
- Organisation(s): BDO; PDC
- Format: Sets
- Prize fund: €185,000 (2007)
- Month(s) Played: February
- Final Year: 2007

Final champion(s)
- (Netherlands) Raymond van Barneveld

The Masters of Darts has a unique place in darts history as it was the first televised tournament to be co-sanctioned by both the two rival organisations, the British Darts Organisation (BDO) and the Professional Darts Corporation (PDC) since they separated in 1993. There had been two "champion versus champion" matches held (in 1999 and 2004), and many players on both sides of the divide played on TV tournaments on the other side from 1997–2001, but the 2005 Masters of Darts was the first televised tournament to be co-sanctioned by both organizations.

The 2005 Masters of Darts took place between February 7 and February 13, 2005 at the ExpoCenter in Hengelo, The Netherlands. The best four players from both federations were invited, with a BDO vs. PDC format in the round robin. The tournament was arranged by PenH Events, who managed to secure a three-year contract with Raymond van Barneveld, a BDO player at the time, taking part in the tournament. The host broadcaster was RTL5 in the Netherlands, who had also secured a three-year deal to broadcast the event. The tournament was not held in 2006 and by the time it was revived for 2007, SBS6 took over as Dutch broadcasters for the event.

At the time the 2007 tournament details were announced there were four BDO players, five PDC players and an unnamed wildcard scheduled to appear. In the weeks leading up to the event all four BDO players switched to the PDC making the tournament effectively a PDC tournament. The 2007 Masters of Darts instead had an England vs. Netherlands format in the round robin.

== Final results ==
Year	Champion	Score	Runner-up	Total prize money	Winner's prize
2005	Phil Taylor (102.21)	7–1	Andy Fordham (92.64)	€395,000	€150,000
2007	(Netherlands) Raymond van Barneveld (107.90)	7–0	(England) Peter Manley (94.66)	€185,000	€50,000

=== 2005 event ===
Phil Taylor marched through the competition, winning all four group games against BDO players and dropped only two sets on the way. He then beat Raymond van Barneveld in the semi-final and Andy Fordham in the final to win the top prize €150,000 (approx £100,000) – one of the highest prizes in darts history at that time.

=== 2007 event ===
The 2007 tournament featured a nine dart finish by Michael van Gerwen, Phil Taylor finished bottom of the England group losing three of his five matches. Peter Manley achieved a 100% record en route to the final against Raymond van Barneveld, but van Barneveld clinched the title with a whitewash 7–0 set victory.
