= Finder Darts Masters =

Finder Masters

Tournament information
- Venue: Zuiderduin Hotel
- Location: Egmond aan Zee
- Country: Netherlands
- Established: 1995
- Organisation(s): WDF/BDO
- Format: Legs (round robin); Sets (knock out)
- Month(s) Played: December
- Final Year: 2018

Final champion(s)
- (England) Glen Durrant (men's) (England) Lisa Ashton (women's) (Republic of Ireland) Keane Barry (youth's)

The Finder Darts Masters was a darts tournament held in Egmond aan Zee, Netherlands, sanctioned by the British Darts Organisation and the World Darts Federation, running intermittently under several different names from 1995 to 2018.

The tournament was previously known as the Zuiderduin Masters from 2007 to 2014, as the Leendesk Masters in 2005, as the Doeland Grand Masters from 2001 to 2004, as the European Grand Masters in 2000, and as the Dutch Grand Masters in 1995 and 1996. It was held in December and was traditionally the last BDO event held before the annual World Championship. The tournament was an unranked event until 2008, when it was installed as a ranking event, along with the World Championships and the World Masters, following the cancellation of the World Darts Trophy and the International Darts League.

The organizers of the event announced in 2019 that that year's event would not take place due to the termination of the sponsorship with Dutch e-commerce company Finder, and the tournament has been discontinued.

== History ==
=== 1995–1996: Dutch Grand Masters ===
The competition began in 1995, known as the Dutch Grand Masters with Raymond van Barneveld and Francis Hoenselaar winning their first major tournament. The tournament ceased between 1997 and 1999.

=== 2000: European Grand Masters ===
Following a growth in the popularity in darts in the Netherlands because of the great success of players such as Raymond van Barneveld the event returned in 2000. It returned as the "European Grand Masters" in 2000.

=== 2001–2004: Doeland Grand Masters ===
The tournament became the "Doeland Grand Masters" from 2001 to 2004.

=== 2005: Leendesk Masters ===
In 2005 the tournament was named the "Leendesk Masters".

=== 2007–2014: Zuiderduin Masters ===
The 2006 Masters was postponed, and was to be held in March 2007, reverting to its original title "Dutch Grand Masters".

The event was later cancelled, due to lack of sponsorship, but was revived later that year when the tournament venue, the Hotel Zuidenduin, stepped in to sponsor the tournament signing a five-year contract until 2012, and it was branded the Zuiderduin Masters. Following sponsorship from the Hotel Zuiderduin, a women's competition was added in 2008 and after a demonstration tournament for juniors in 2010, a juniors competition was added in 2011. A new three-year contract was agreed in 2011 for it to remain the Zuiderduin Masters up to 2014.

The first nine-dart finish at the tournament was recorded by Darryl Fitton in 2009.

=== 2015–2018: Finder Darts Masters ===
Finder, an international operating company, took over the naming rights to the tournament from the 2015 edition onwards. It was branded the Finder Darts Masters.

== Format ==
=== Men ===
The field is made up of 24 players. Qualification is determined from the top 16 players from the Zuiderduin Masters ranking table, which is separate from the BDO/WDF World Rankings, as well four players from the International Darts Tour of the Lowlands (IDTL) before its collapse in 2010/2011, and the winner of the Netherlands Champions League of Darts, plus 3 wild cards. If an IDTL qualifier is already qualified through his ranking, an extra wild card becomes available.

From 2011, the men's winner at the MariFlex Open, a Zuiderduin Masters ranking event, gained automatic entry in to that years Zuiderduin Masters tournament. It was replaced with the Hal Open in 2014, but retained the same stipulations the MariFlex Open had. Since the 2013 Zuiderduin Masters tournament, the men's champion from the previous year was invited back to the following year's tournament.

The 24 players are split into 8 groups, with each player playing 2 matches, best of 9 legs. The top player from each group advance to the quarter-finals, which is played in set format through to the final.

=== Women ===
Following the tournament's inception as a ranking event in 2008, a women's competition was installed with an eight-player field, made up from the top five players in the Zuiderduin Masters rankings, an IDTL qualifier before its collapse, the NDB Champions League of Darts winner and a wildcard. Likewise with the men's event, an extra wildcard can also be awarded. The competition was played in a straight knockout format.

The women's competition was played in a straight knockout format up to and including the 2010 tournament before a new format was introduced in 2011. The field was shortened to six players. Two groups consist of three players playing one another once, with both group winners advancing to the final. The group stage matches are played over a legs format before the final in played in a sets format.

From 2011, the six-player field has been made up from the top two players in the Zuiderduin Masters rankings, the NDB Champions League of Darts winner, two wildcards and the MariFlex Open winner. From 2011, the women's winner at the MariFlex Open, a Zuiderduin Masters ranking event, gained automatic entry into that years Zuiderduin Masters tournament. It was replaced with the Hal Open in 2014, but retained the same stipulations the MariFlex Open had. Since the 2013 Zuiderduin Masters tournament, the women's champion from the previous year has been invited back to the following year's tournament.

=== Youth ===
The youth tournament was instigated in 2011 with the first winner being Jimmy Hendriks who in the same year also won the WDF World Youth Cup and World Youth Masters.

== Venue ==
The tournament has been held at the Hotel Zuiderduin in Egmond aan Zee since 2001. The 2000 tournament was held in Hardenberg. In 2007, following the postponement of the 2006 event, plans were made to host the 2007 Dutch Grand Masters in Rosmalen, but after it was cancelled, the plans were aborted and it remained in Egmond.

== List of tournaments ==
=== Men's ===
| Year | Champion | Av. | Score | Runner-Up | Av. | Prize Money | | | Venue |
| Year | Champion | Av. | Score | Runner-Up | Av. | Total | Ch. | R.-Up | Venue |
|---|---|---|---|---|---|---|---|---|---|
| 1995 | (Netherlands) Raymond van Barneveld | n/a | 4 – 3 | (Wales) Richie Burnett | n/a | n/a | n/a | n/a | |
| 1996 | (England) Martin Adams | n/a | 4 – 2 | (England) Mervyn King | n/a | n/a | n/a | n/a | |
| 2000 | (England) Martin Adams (2) | 97.05 | 5 – 4 | (England) Steve Beaton | 92.70 | €25,500 | €5,000 | €2,500 | Evenementenhal, Hardenberg |
| 2001 | (Netherlands) Raymond van Barneveld (2) | n/a | 5 – 1 | (England) Andy Fordham | n/a | €25,500 | €5,000 | €2,500 | Hotel Zuiderduin, Egmond aan Zee |
| 2002 | (Australia) Tony David | 96.03 | 6 – 4 | (England) Mervyn King | 95.07 | €25,500 | €5,000 | €2,500 | Hotel Zuiderduin, Egmond aan Zee |
| 2003 | (Netherlands) Raymond van Barneveld (3) | 94.23 | 6 – 1 | (England) Mervyn King | 88.05 | €33,500 | €5,000 | €2,500 | Hotel Zuiderduin, Egmond aan Zee |
| 2004 | (Netherlands) Raymond van Barneveld (4) | 94.17 | 5 – 1 | (England) Ted Hankey | 81.21 | €33,500 | €5,000 | €2,500 | Hotel Zuiderduin, Egmond aan Zee |
| 2005 | (England) Mervyn King | 99.30 | 5 – 4 | (England) Martin Adams | 99.48 | €33,500 | €5,000 | €2,500 | Hotel Zuiderduin, Egmond aan Zee |
| 2007 | (Scotland) Gary Anderson | 100.32 | 5 – 4 | (Wales) Mark Webster | 96.45 | €33,500 | €5,000 | €2,500 | Hotel Zuiderduin, Egmond aan Zee |
| 2008 | (Scotland) Gary Anderson (2) | 99.21 | 5 – 4 | (England) Scott Waites | 93.75 | €33,500 | €5,000 | €2,500 | Hotel Zuiderduin, Egmond aan Zee |
| 2009 | (England) Darryl Fitton | 93.94 | 5 – 2 | (England) Martin Adams | 97.00 | €33,500 | €5,000 | €2,500 | Hotel Zuiderduin, Egmond aan Zee |
| 2010 | (Scotland) Ross Montgomery | 94.17 | 5 – 4 | (England) Robbie Green | 93.81 | €33,500 | €5,000 | €2,500 | Hotel Zuiderduin, Egmond aan Zee |
| 2011 | (England) Scott Waites | 99.62 | 5 – 4 | (England) Darryl Fitton | 97.91 | €33,500 | €5,000 | €2,500 | Hotel Zuiderduin, Egmond aan Zee |
| 2012 | (England) Stephen Bunting | 97.62 | 5 – 0 | (England) Alan Norris | 92.67 | €33,500 | €5,000 | €2,500 | Hotel Zuiderduin, Egmond aan Zee |
| 2013 | (England) James Wilson | 91.10 | 5 – 1 | (England) Stephen Bunting | 88.45 | €33,500 | €5,000 | €2,500 | Hotel Zuiderduin, Egmond aan Zee |
| 2014 | (England) Jamie Hughes | 96.12 | 5 – 0 | (England) Gary Robson | 86.22 | €33,500 | €5,000 | €2,500 | Hotel Zuiderduin, Egmond aan Zee |
| 2015 | (England) Glen Durrant | 100.83 | 5 – 2 | (England) Martin Adams | 97.35 | €33,500 | €5,000 | €2,500 | Hotel Zuiderduin, Egmond aan Zee |
| 2016 | (England) Glen Durrant (2) | 97.33 | 5 – 3 | (England) Jamie Hughes | 89.53 | €33,500 | €5,000 | €2,500 | Hotel Zuiderduin, Egmond aan Zee |
| 2017 | (Netherlands) Danny Noppert | 95.03 | 5 – 3 | (Wales) Jim Williams | 86.97 | €33,500 | €5,000 | €2,500 | Hotel Zuiderduin, Egmond aan Zee |
| 2018 | (England) Glen Durrant (3) | 100.60 | 5 – 3 | (Netherlands) Richard Veenstra | 92.11 | €33,500 | €5,000 | €2,500 | Hotel Zuiderduin, Egmond aan Zee |

=== Women's ===
| Year | Champion | Av. | Score | Runner-Up | Av. | Prize Money | | | Venue |
| Year | Champion | Av. | Score | Runner-Up | Av. | Total | Ch. | R.-Up | Venue |
|---|---|---|---|---|---|---|---|---|---|
| 1995 | (Netherlands) Francis Hoenselaar | n/a | 3 – 2 | (England) Mandy Solomons | n/a | n/a | n/a | n/a | |
| 1996 | (England) Deta Hedman | n/a | 3 – 1 | (Netherlands) Francis Hoenselaar | n/a | n/a | n/a | n/a | |
| 2008 | (England) Lisa Ashton | 78.42 | 2 – 0 | (England) Trina Gulliver | 65.91 | €6,100 | €1,750 | €1,250 | Hotel Zuiderduin, Egmond aan Zee |
| 2009 | (Wales) Julie Gore | 86.07 | 2 – 0 | (England) Tricia Wright | 81.75 | €6,100 | €1,750 | €1,250 | Hotel Zuiderduin, Egmond aan Zee |
| 2010 | (England) Trina Gulliver | 78.60 | 2 – 1 | (Netherlands) Francis Hoenselaar | 71.79 | €6,100 | €1,750 | €1,250 | Hotel Zuiderduin, Egmond aan Zee |
| 2011 | (England) Deta Hedman (2) | 81.99 | 2 – 0 | (Netherlands) Aileen de Graaf | 68.25 | €5,300 | €1,750 | €1,250 | Hotel Zuiderduin, Egmond aan Zee |
| 2012 | (Russia) Anastasia Dobromyslova | 74.34 | 2 – 1 | (Netherlands) Aileen de Graaf | 84.69 | €5,300 | €1,750 | €1,250 | Hotel Zuiderduin, Egmond aan Zee |
| 2013 | (Netherlands) Aileen de Graaf | 74.34 | 2 – 0 | (Russia) Anastasia Dobromyslova | 73.74 | €5,300 | €1,750 | €1,250 | Hotel Zuiderduin, Egmond aan Zee |
| 2014 | (Russia) Anastasia Dobromyslova (2) | 78.09 | 2 – 1 | (Netherlands) Aileen de Graaf | 71.88 | €5,300 | €1,750 | €1,250 | Hotel Zuiderduin, Egmond aan Zee |
| 2015 | (England) Fallon Sherrock | 88.41 | 2 – 0 | (Russia) Anastasia Dobromyslova | 73.95 | €5,300 | €1,750 | €1,250 | Hotel Zuiderduin, Egmond aan Zee |
| 2016 | (Russia) Anastasia Dobromyslova (3) | 77.60 | 2 – 1 | (Netherlands) Aileen de Graaf | 70.71 | €5,300 | €1,750 | €1,250 | Hotel Zuiderduin, Egmond aan Zee |
| 2017 | (Netherlands) Aileen de Graaf (2) | 75.78 | 2 – 0 | (England) Deta Hedman | 66.31 | €5,300 | €1,750 | €1,250 | Hotel Zuiderduin, Egmond aan Zee |
| 2018 | (England) Lisa Ashton (2) | 88.68 | 2 – 1 | (England) Fallon Sherrock | 84.58 | €5,300 | €1,750 | €1,250 | Hotel Zuiderduin, Egmond aan Zee |

=== Youth's ===
| Year | Champion | Av. | Score | Runner-up | Av. | Venue |
|---|---|---|---|---|---|---|
| 2011 | (Netherlands) Jimmy Hendriks | n/a | 2 – 1 | (Netherlands) Mike Zuydwijk | n/a | Hotel Zuiderduin, Egmond aan Zee |
| 2012 | (Netherlands) Quin Wester | n/a | 2 – 0 | (Belgium) Kenny Neyens | n/a | Hotel Zuiderduin, Egmond aan Zee |
| 2013 | (Netherlands) Colin Roelofs | n/a | 2 – 0 | (Netherlands) Berry van Peer | n/a | Hotel Zuiderduin, Egmond aan Zee |
| 2014 | (England) Callan Rydz | n/a | 2 – 0 | (Netherlands) Mike van Duivenbode | n/a | Hotel Zuiderduin, Egmond aan Zee |
| 2015 | (Netherlands) Justin van Tergouw | n/a | 2 – 0 | (Netherlands) Maikel Verberk | n/a | Hotel Zuiderduin, Egmond aan Zee |
| 2016 | (Netherlands) Justin van Tergouw (2) | n/a | 2 – 0 | (England) Owen Maiden | n/a | Hotel Zuiderduin, Egmond aan Zee |
| 2017 | (England) Jarred Cole | 86.16 | 2 – 0 | (Scotland) Nathan Girvan | 77.50 | Hotel Zuiderduin, Egmond aan Zee |
| 2018 | (Republic of Ireland) Keane Barry | 80.52 | 2 – 0 | (Netherlands) Levy Frauenfelder | 75.47 | Hotel Zuiderduin, Egmond aan Zee |

== Finalists ==
| Player | 1st | 2nd |
|---|---|---|
| (Netherlands) Raymond van Barneveld | 4 | 0 |
| (England) Glen Durrant | 3 | 0 |
| (England) Martin Adams | 2 | 3 |
| (Scotland) Gary Anderson | 2 | 0 |
| (England) Mervyn King | 1 | 3 |
| (England) Stephen Bunting | 1 | 1 |
| (England) Darryl Fitton | 1 | 1 |
| (England) Jamie Hughes | 1 | 1 |
| (England) Scott Waites | 1 | 1 |
| (Australia) Tony David | 1 | 0 |
| (Scotland) Ross Montgomery | 1 | 0 |
| (Netherlands) Danny Noppert | 1 | 0 |
| (England) James Wilson | 1 | 0 |
| (England) Steve Beaton | 0 | 1 |
| (England) Andy Fordham | 0 | 1 |
| (England) Robbie Green | 0 | 1 |
| (England) Ted Hankey | 0 | 1 |
| (England) Alan Norris | 0 | 1 |
| (England) Gary Robson | 0 | 1 |
| (Netherlands) Richard Veenstra | 0 | 1 |
| (Wales) Mark Webster | 0 | 1 |
| (Wales) Jim Williams | 0 | 1 |
| (Wales) Richie Burnett | 0 | 1 |
