= World Darts Trophy =

Professional darts tournament (2002–2007)

- Founded: 2002
- First season: 2002
- Folded: 2007
- Organizing body: BDO, WDF
- Country: Netherlands
- Venues: De Vechtsebanen, Utrecht
- Last champions: (Scotland) Gary Anderson (men) (Netherlands) Karin Krappen (women) (Netherlands) Ron Meulenkamp (junior) (2007)
- Tournament format: Sets (men); Sets (women); Legs (Junior)

The Bullit World Darts Trophy was a professional darts tournament run by the British Darts Organisation and the World Darts Federation. Held each September from 2002 to 2007, it took place at the De Vechtsebanen in Utrecht, Netherlands. The tournament had a playing format comparable with the two World Championships (BDO and PDC). Until 2007, it formed the third leg of the BDO Grand Slam, along with the BDO World Championship, the World Masters and the International Darts League.

== Tournament history ==
First held in 2002, the tournament was played under the auspices of the World Darts Federation, British Darts Organisation and the Dutch Darts Association (NDB, the Dutch governing body of darts) and featured players from those organisations up to and including 2005.

=== PDC Participation ===
However, in 2006, following Raymond van Barneveld's move to the PDC in February of that year, host broadcasters SBS6, were able to grant invitations to five non-WDF affiliated players, meaning that players from the PDC would be able to compete in the event for the first time. Van Barneveld, along with Phil Taylor, Colin Lloyd, Ronnie Baxter and Peter Manley were given the five invitations that were offered to the PDC.

In 2007, the WDT included the top 12 players in the PDC Order of Merit and four PDC Qualifiers, giving a total of 16 PDC players who would line up alongside 12 from the WDF rankings and 4 wildcards, which were given to Jelle Klaasen, Michael van Gerwen, Vincent van der Voort and Mervyn King, all of whom had left the BDO to join the PDC earlier that year.

=== End of event ===
Towards the end of 2007, the chairman of the PDC, Barry Hearn, announced that its players would not be competing in the 2008 International Darts League and World Darts Trophy events. As a result, SBS6 announced they would no longer be broadcasting the event, with their coverage relying heavily on big names such as van Barneveld, which then cast doubts over whether either tournament would go ahead.

The tournament promoters filed a lawsuit against the PDC and SBS6 claiming a contract had been agreed for the PDC players to be involved. The case ended in failure on 21 February 2008, and the International Darts League was indefinitely postponed. The future of the World Darts Trophy was also thrown into doubt as a result of the decision, and both events were confirmed defunct by the failure of an appeal on 29 April 2008.

== Sponsors ==
- 2004–2006 Bavaria (Premium Dutch beer)
- 2007 Bullit (Energy drink)

== Prize Fund ==
- Winner €45,000
- Runner Up €22,500
- Joint 3rd 2 x €11,250
- Joint 5th 4 x €6,000
- Joint 9th 8 x €3,000
- Joint 17th 16 x €2,000
- Joint 33rd and 41st 24 x €1,000
- Totals €194,000

== Final results and statistics ==
=== Men's Finals ===
Year	Champion	Av	Score (sets)	Runner-up	Av
2002	(Australia) Tony David	(97.80)	6–0	(England) Tony O'Shea	(90.48)
2003	(Netherlands) Raymond van Barneveld	(104.91)	6–2	(England) Mervyn King	(98.07)
2004	(Netherlands) Raymond van Barneveld	(94.71)	6–4	(England) Martin Adams	(91.50)
2005	(England) Gary Robson	(91.50)	6–4	(England) Mervyn King	(88.80)
2006	(England) Phil Taylor	(102.21)	7–2	(England) Martin Adams	(94.77)
2007	(Scotland) Gary Anderson	(103.32)	7–3	(England) Phil Taylor	(102.30)

=== Women's finals ===
Year	Champion	Av	Score (sets)	Runner-up	Av
2002	(Netherlands) Mieke de Boer	(68.52)	3–1	(England) Crissy Manley	(64.83)
2003	(England) Trina Gulliver	(83.01)	3–1	(Netherlands) Francis Hoenselaar	(80.07)
2004	(Netherlands) Francis Hoenselaar	(85.20)	3–1	(Russia) Anastasia Dobromyslova	(76.77)
2005	(Netherlands) Karin Krappen	(75.69)	3–1	(Netherlands) Francis Hoenselaar	(71.94)

=== Junior WDT finals ===
Year	Champion	Score (Legs)	Runner-up
2006	(Netherlands) Ron Meulenkamp	6–1	(Netherlands) Sven van Dun
