= International Darts League =

Darts tournament

- Founded: 2003
- First season: 2003
- Folded: 2007
- Organizing body: BDO/WDF; PDC Major (by invite)
- Country: Netherlands
- Venues: Triavium, Nijmegen
- Last champions: (Scotland) Gary Anderson (England) Richie George (youth) (2007)
- Tournament format: Legs (round robin); Sets (knockout)

The Topic International Darts League was a darts tournament held at the Triavium in Nijmegen, Netherlands. Raymond van Barneveld dominated the tournament, held in his home country, winning it on three of the five occasions it was held. Gary Anderson was the final champion, having claimed the title in 2007, when the tournament also became the first major event to witness two nine dart finishes.

Held in May, it was the second leg of the BDO’s Grand Slam title of televised majors, along with the World Darts Trophy, the Winmau World Masters and the Lakeside World Professional Championship.

It began as a tournament for BDO players, but following van Barneveld's move to the PDC, Dutch broadcaster SBS-6 were able to grant five invitations to non-WDF affiliated players for the first time in 2006, in order to maintain interest in the event. The number of invitations was increased to 20 in 2007 as more Dutch players, including Jelle Klaasen and Michael van Gerwen, had moved to the PDC. This was done with the agreement of the Schoofs Management & Events/Maximum Score – the owner and promoter of the tournament.

== End of event ==
Towards the end of 2007, the chairman of the PDC, Barry Hearn, announced that its players would not be competing in the 2008 International Darts League and World Darts Trophy events. As a result, SBS6 announced they would no longer be broadcasting the event, with their coverage relying heavily on big names such as van Barneveld, which then cast doubts over whether either tournament would go ahead.

The tournament promoters filed a lawsuit against the PDC and SBS6 claiming a contract had been agreed for the PDC players to be involved. The case ended in failure on 21 February 2008, and the International Darts League was indefinitely postponed. The future of the World Darts Trophy was also thrown into doubt as a result of the decision, and both events were confirmed defunct by the failure of an appeal on April 29, 2008.

== Format ==
The format has changed slightly over the years – the 2006 competition had 8 round-robin groups of 4 players. The top two players in each group qualified for another round-robin phase. Again, the top two players in each group progressed, but this time to the quarter-finals of the knockout stages.

Despite the presence of the PDC players in 2006 and 2007, the tournament was still a WDF/BDO ranking event, with all available points going only to the WDF/BDO players competing.

== International Darts League finals ==
Year	Champion (average in final)	Score	Runner-up (average in final)	Prize money			Sponsor
Year	Champion (average in final)	Score	Runner-up (average in final)	Total	Champion	Runner-up	Sponsor
2003	(Netherlands) Raymond van Barneveld (97.77)	8–5	(England) Mervyn King (97.50)	€134,000	€30,000	€15,000	Tempus
2004	(Netherlands) Raymond van Barneveld (101.64)	13–5	(Australia) Tony David (95.04)	€134,000	€30,000	€15,000	Tempus
2005	(England) Mervyn King (91.89)	13–11	(England) Tony O'Shea (91.74)	€134,000	€30,000	€15,000	Tempus
2006	(Netherlands) Raymond van Barneveld (99.54)	13–5	(England) Colin Lloyd (95.25)	€134,000	€30,000	€15,000	Topic
2007	(Scotland) Gary Anderson (95.85)	13–9	(Wales) Mark Webster (94.54)	€158,000	€30,000	€15,000	Topic
