= Lakeside Leisure Complex =

Entertainment venue in Frimley Green, England

Coordinates: 51°18′11″N 0°43′17″W

The Lakeside Leisure Complex is a hotel, conferencing, entertainment and associated leisure complex in Frimley Green in west Surrey, England. It hosted the open/men's and women's BDO World Darts Championship every January from 1986 to 2019.

== History ==
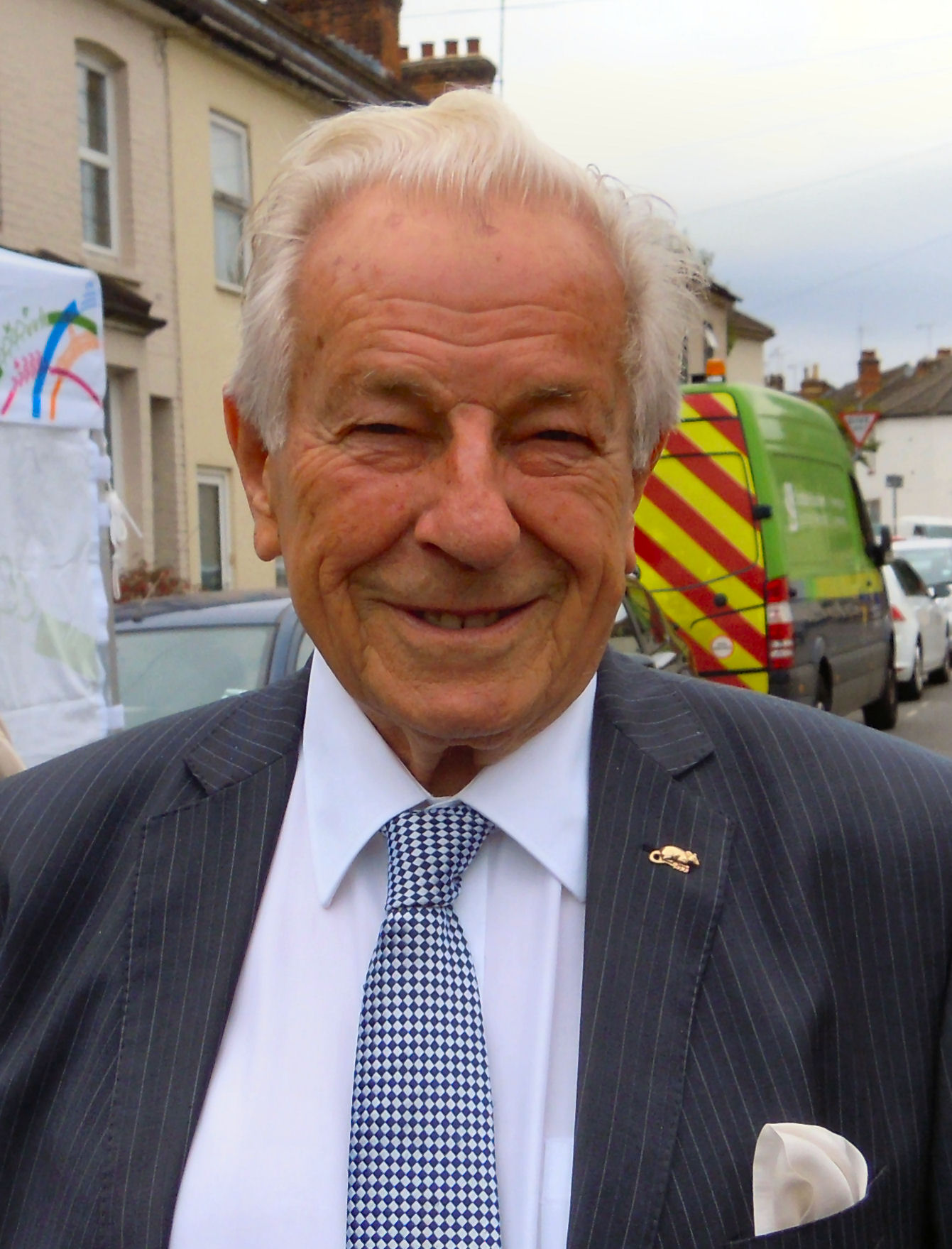
Bob Potter OBE in 2017

The complex was established in 1972, when Bob Potter bought Wharfenden House and the surrounding grounds and lake. He soon doubled the hall to 1,000 seats principally for hosting comedians and musicians, including North American and internationally acclaimed acts. Lakeside was almost completely destroyed in a fire in November 1978, but was subsequently rebuilt, reopening in October the following year.

During the 25th year of hosting the World Darts Championship, in 2010 the lake had largely iced over by 7 January. That day the body of a man, a hotel guest for the competition week, was found. Landowner-managers, Bob Potter Leisure Limited, were fined £85,000 for health and safety violations.

Bob Potter died on 14 April 2023, at the age of 94.

== Events ==
The Lakeside became the venue of the World Darts Championship in 1986. The Club sponsored the event from 2004 to 2019. It has hosted the new WDF World Darts Championship since 2022.

The venue has hosted acts such as Tommy Cooper, Morecambe and Wise, Sammy Davis Jr, Frankie Vaughan and Bob Monkhouse.

The 'Small Business Bureau Conference', held in 1987, was claimed by the organisers to be the largest business conference in Europe.

== Facilities ==
Grand venue

The largest venue is the Main Cabaret Suite which has a capacity of 1,170 with conference and banqueting facilities.

Others

- the Canal Suite (capacity 350)
- the State Suite (capacity 100)
- Bob's Bar
- the Sharman Suite
- the Wine Bar

It is a mixed members' club, hotel and selection of restaurants with snooker, pool, darts, ten-pin bowling, squash, bars, an events nightclub and gym.

== Heyday as a club ==
Darts commentator and personality Sid Waddell looked back on the early darts era when Lakeside was "arguably the best club in Britain":

"Tom Jones, Jim Davidson and other stars packed the joint, while Margaret Thatcher herself said it was one of her favourite places for Tory jollies."

Potter claimed that he and his facilities inspired Peter Kay's comedic business saga Phoenix Nights, whose character is named Brian Potter.
