= Set (darts) =

Sequence of games in darts

A set in darts consists of an odd-number sequence of legs (games) played, ending when the count of legs won meets certain criteria. Throwing first is considered an advantage in a leg, so players alternate who throws first in each leg during the set.

Generally, a set will consist of the best of five legs (first player to win three) – although there are some exceptions. The most notable being the World Masters, where a set is the best of three legs (first to two).

== Example ==
During the final of the 2007 PDC World Darts Championship, Raymond van Barneveld defeated Phil Taylor by seven sets to six in one of the most dramatic darts matches of all-time. The breakdown of how each set went is shown here.

Raymond van Barneveld 7–6 Phil Taylor
(set scores: 0–3, 0–3, 1–3, 3–0, 3–2, 0–3, 3–0, 2–3, 3–0, 3–1, 3–2, 2–3, 6–5)

Taylor won the first two sets by three legs to nil, then added the third set before van Barneveld took the next two. The match continued and went to six sets all. Neither player managed to gain a two-leg advantage in the final set "tiebreak" so the deciding leg was played when the score reached 5–5. Before the final leg, the players threw for the bullseye with the nearest given the advantage of throwing first.

== Tournaments using sets ==
In recent years, more and more new tournaments have decided against using sets as the scoring method – preferring to use the matchplay format of best of x legs (such as in the UK Open and Grand Slam of Darts).

Currently the following tournaments use sets as their scoring system.

- PDC World Championship (five legs per set)
- WDF World Championship (five legs per set)
- World Grand Prix (five legs per set)
- World Masters (three legs per set)

== See also ==
- Scoring in darts
