= 1998 WDF Europe Cup =

Tournament information
- Venue: Rica Hotel Oslofjord
- Location: Oslo
- Country: Norway
- Established: 6-9 August
- Organisation(s): WDF
- Format: Legs

Champion(s)
- Singles (Netherlands) Co Stompé (men's singles) (Northern Ireland) Denise Cassidy (women's singles); Pairs; Sean Palfrey & Martin Phillips (men's pairs) (England) Trina Gulliver & Mandy Solomons (women's pairs); Team; England (men's team); Overall; Wales (men's overall); England (women's overall)

The 1998 WDF Europe Cup was the 11th edition of the WDF Europe Cup darts tournament, organised by the World Darts Federation. It was held in Oslo, Norway from 6 to 9 August.

== Entered teams ==
26 countries/associations entered a men's selection in the event.

21 countries/associations entered a women's selection in the event.

Nr.	Country	Men's Selection
1	Austria	Franz Thaler, Axel Tschinkowitz, Jerome Zeleny, Boris Hristovski
2	Belgium	Tanguy Borra, Luc Vriesacker, Chris van den Bergh, Erik Clarys
3	Cyprus	George Trypiniotis, Ermos Korradou, Demetris Georgiou, Andrea Podilatas
4	Czech Republic	Jaroslav Mottl, Jaroslav Zenisek, Blaine Karst, Oldrich Sulc
5	Denmark	Ole Jorgensen, Frede Johansen, Bjarne Jensen, Brian Buur
6	England	Steve Beaton, Ronnie Baxter, Martin Adams, Andy Fordham
7	Faroe Islands	Janus Jacobsen, Mikael Mortensen, Petur Gronagard, Poul Poulsen
8	Finland	Keivo Survonen, Marko Pusa, Jarkko Komula, Marko Kantele
9	France	Cristian Le Borgne, Stephane Dalancon, Pascal Fontaine, Jean-Luc Mortelec
10	Germany	Bernd Hebecker, Andreas Krockel, Andree Welge, Colin Rice
11	Gibraltar	Francis Taylor, Tony Dawkins, John Neale, George Federico
12	Greece	Christos Padazopoulos, Paris Chloros, Kyriakos Anastasiadis, Stelios Laskaris
13	Hungary	Attila Port, Attila Kulcar, Tibor Kiss, Levente Szekely
14	Iceland	Throsdur Ingimarsson, Kristinn Kristinnsson, Oil Sigurdson, Thorgeir Gudmundson
15	Ireland	Seamus Gormley, Brendan Grace, John Burke, Jack McKenna
16	Isle of Man	Geoff Hurst, Charlie Cover, Paul Sertin, Paul Whitehead
17	Italy	Luca Falseti, Paolo Urbani, Maurizio Moretti, Loris Polese
18	Latvia	Ivaers Adamson, Uldis Erkis, David Field, Dzintars Salmins
19	Malta	Godfrey Abela, John Demicoli, Charles Ghiller, Vincent Busuttil
20	Netherlands	Co Stompé, Raymond van Barneveld, Roland Scholten, Richard Rietveld
21	Northern Ireland	Brian Elder, John Elder, Louis Doherty, John Magowan
22	Norway	Arne Sivertsen, John Sandaker, Vidar Samuelsen, Terje Deras
23	Scotland	Les Wallace, Mike Veitch, Bob Taylor, Peter Johnstone
24	Sweden	Peter Brolin, Nils-Gunnar Manshed, Peter Sjoberg, Stefan Nagy
25	Switzerland	Gaudenz Coray, Beat Basler, Urs Von Rufs, Rene Handschin
26	Wales	Sean Palfrey, Martin Phillips, Marshall James, Ritchie Davies

Nr.	Country	Woman's Selection
1	Austria	Gabrielle Klem & Michaela Blahaus
2	Cyprus	Alexia Demetriou & Teresa Mills
3	Czech Republic	Kveta Drahuska & Vladimira Dudkova
4	Denmark	Ann-Louise Peters & Annette Hakonsen
5	England	Mandy Solomons & Trina Gulliver
6	Finland	Heli Ohvavainen & Tarja Salminen
7	France	Virginie Vinet & Isabelle Caron
8	Germany	Bianka Strauch & Heike Ernst
9	Gibraltar	Sue Parody & Sue Vinent
10	Hungary	Timea Dobos & Ibolya Pentek
11	Ireland	Marion McDermott & Maureen Kelly
12	Isle of Man	Linda Jordon & Jackie Sayle
13	Italy	Loredana Brumetz & Carla Constantini
14	Latvia	Laura Aboltina & Sunny Field
15	Netherlands	Mieke de Boer & Valerie Maytum
16	Northern Ireland	Denise Cassidy & Grace Crane
17	Norway	Mette Engen-Hansen & Tove Vestrum
18	Scotland	Anne Kirk & Donna Robertson
19	Sweden	Linda Nilsson & Kristina Korpii
20	Switzerland	Lisa Huber & Corrine Wittwer
21	Wales	Sandra Greatbatch & Gaynor Williams

== Men's singles ==
1st Round (best of 7 legs)
(Norway) Arne Sivertsen
Bye
(Netherlands) Roland Scholten	4
(Germany) Andree Welge	2
(Hungary) Levente Szekely
Bye
(Northern Ireland) Louis Doherty	4
(Republic of Ireland) John Burke	0
(England) Steve Beaton	4
(Austria) Axel Tschinkowitz	0
(Wales) Ritchie Davies	4
(Faroe Islands) Mikael Mortensen	0
(Iceland) Thorgeir Gudmundson	1
(Gibraltar) Tony Dawkins	4
(Scotland) Peter Johnstone
Bye
(Finland) Keivo Survonen
Bye
(Cyprus) Demetris Georgiou	4
(Greece) Paris Chloros	0
(Isle of Man) Geoff Hurst	0
(Denmark) Bjarne Jensen	4
(Switzerland) Beat Basler
Bye
(Sweden) Stefan Nagy	4
(Latvia) David Field	0
(Czech Republic) Jaroslav Mottl	4
(Italy) Maurizio Moretti	3
(Belgium) Tanguy Borra	4
(France) Cristian Le Borgne	1
(Malta) John Demicoli
Bye
(Denmark) Brian Buur
Bye
(Norway) Vidar Samuelsen	2
(Republic of Ireland) Jack McKenna	4
(Greece) Kyriakos Anastasiadis
Bye
(Germany) Colin Rice	4
(Gibraltar) John Neale	0
(Scotland) Les Wallace	4
(Hungary) Tibor Kiss	3
(Switzerland) Rene Handschin	4
(Cyprus) Ermos Korradou	3
(Northern Ireland) Brian Elder	4
(Austria) Jerome Zeleny	0
(Latvia) Ivaers Adamson
Bye
(Sweden) Peter Sjoberg
Bye
(England) Andy Fordham	4
(Malta) Charles Ghiller	1
(Netherlands) Richard Rietveld	4
(Iceland) Oil Sigurdson	1
(France) Pascal Fontaine
Bye
(Wales) Martin Phillips	4
(Finland) Marko Pusa	1
(Faroe Islands) Petur Gronagard	2
(Italy) Paolo Urbani	4
(Belgium) Chris van den Bergh	4
(Czech Republic) Jaroslav Zenisek	0
(Isle of Man) Paul Sertin
Bye
(Italy) Loris Polese
Bye
(England) Ronnie Baxter	2
(Scotland) Bob Taylor	4
(Iceland) Throsdur Ingimarsson
Bye
(Wales) Sean Palfrey	4
(Latvia) Uldis Erkis	0
(Netherlands) Co Stompé	4
(Faroe Islands) Poul Poulsen	0
(Greece) Stelios Laskaris	4
(Austria) Franz Thaler	1
(Sweden) Peter Brolin	4
(Malta) Vincent Busuttil	3
(Isle of Man) Charlie Cover
Bye
(Republic of Ireland) Brendan Grace
Bye
(Denmark) Frede Johansen	4
(Switzerland) Gaudenz Coray	0
(Finland) Jarkko Komula	4
(Gibraltar) Francis Taylor	3
(Norway) John Sandaker
Bye
(Germany) Andreas Kröckel	4
(Belgium) Luc Vriesacker	2
(Cyprus) Andrea Podilatas	4
(Hungary) Attila Port	2
(Northern Ireland) John Elder	4
(France) Jean-Luc Mortelec	2
(Czech Republic) Blaine Karst
Bye
(Malta) Godfrey Abela
Bye
(Iceland) Kristinn Kristinnsson	1
(Norway) Terje Deras	4
(England) Martin Adams
Bye
(Republic of Ireland) Seamus Gormley	3
(Czech Republic) Oldrich Sulc	4
(Belgium) Erik Clarys	4
(Italy) Luca Falseti	2
(Hungary) Attila Kulcar	4
(Austria) Boris Hristovski	0
(Latvia) Dzintars Salmins	0
(Germany) Bernd Hebecker	4
(Netherlands) Raymond van Barneveld
Bye
(Cyprus) George Trypiniotis
Bye
(Isle of Man) Paul Whitehead	1
(Faroe Islands) Janus Jacobsen	4
(Switzerland) Urs Von Rufs	3
(Finland) Marko Kantele	4
(Scotland) Mike Veitch
Bye
(Northern Ireland) John MaGowan	4
(Greece) Christos Padazopoulos	2
(France) Stephane Dalancon	4
(Denmark) Ole Jorgensen	3
(Gibraltar) George Federico	4
(Sweden) Nils-Gunnar Manshed	3
(Wales) Marshall James
Bye

2nd Round (best of 7 legs)
(Norway) Arne Sivertsen	1
(Netherlands) Roland Scholten	4
(Hungary) Levente Szekely	0
(Northern Ireland) Louis Doherty	4
(England) Steve Beaton	3
(Wales) Ritchie Davies	4
(Gibraltar) Tony Dawkins	2
(Scotland) Peter Johnstone	4
(Finland) Keivo Survonen	4
(Cyprus) Demetris Georgiou	2
(Denmark) Bjarne Jensen	4
(Switzerland) Beat Basler	2
(Sweden) Stefan Nagy	4
(Czech Republic) Jaroslav Mottl	1
(Belgium) Tanguy Borra	4
(Malta) John Demicoli	0
(Denmark) Brian Buur	2
(Republic of Ireland) Jack McKenna	4
(Greece) Kyriakos Anastasiadis	0
(Germany) Colin Rice	4
(Scotland) Les Wallace	4
(Switzerland) Rene Handschin	0
(Northern Ireland) Brian Elder	4
(Latvia) Ivaers Adamson	2
(Sweden) Peter Sjoberg	1
(England) Andy Fordham	4
(Netherlands) Richard Rietveld	4
(France) Pascal Fontaine	0
(Wales) Martin Phillips	4
(Italy) Paolo Urbani	2
(Belgium) Chris van den Bergh	4
(Isle of Man) Paul Sertin	0
(Italy) Loris Polese	1
(Scotland) Bob Taylor	4
(Iceland) Throsdur Ingimarsson	0
(Wales) Sean Palfrey	4
(Netherlands) Co Stompé	4
(Greece) Stelios Laskaris	0
(Sweden) Peter Brolin	4
(Isle of Man) Charlie Cover	0
(Republic of Ireland) Brendan Grace	0
(Denmark) Frede Johansen	4
(Finland) Jarkko Komula	4
(Norway) John Sandaker	1
(Germany) Andreas Kröckel	4
(Cyprus) Andrea Podilatas	0
(Northern Ireland) John Elder	4
(Czech Republic) Blaine Karst	2
(Malta) Godfrey Abela	1
(Norway) Terje Deras	4
(England) Martin Adams	4
(Czech Republic) Oldrich Sulc	0
(Belgium) Erik Clarys	4
(Hungary) Attila Kulcar	0
(Germany) Bernd Hebecker	0
(Netherlands) Raymond van Barneveld	4
(Cyprus) George Trypiniotis	4
(Faroe Islands) Janus Jacobsen	2
(Finland) Marko Kantele	4
(Scotland) Mike Veitch	3
(Northern Ireland) John MaGowan	4
(France) Stephane Dalancon	1
(Gibraltar) George Federico	1
(Wales) Marshall James	4

3rd Round (best of 7 legs)
(Netherlands) Roland Scholten	4
(Northern Ireland) Louis Doherty	2
(Wales) Ritchie Davies	4
(Scotland) Peter Johnstone	2
(Finland) Keivo Survonen	2
(Denmark) Bjarne Jensen	4
(Sweden) Stefan Nagy	1
(Belgium) Tanguy Borra	4
(Republic of Ireland) Jack McKenna	3
(Germany) Colin Rice	4
(Scotland) Les Wallace	4
(Northern Ireland) Brian Elder	1
(England) Andy Fordham	4
(Netherlands) Richard Rietveld	1
(Wales) Martin Phillips	4
(Belgium) Chris van den Bergh	3
(Scotland) Bob Taylor	3
(Wales) Sean Palfrey	4
(Netherlands) Co Stompé	4
(Sweden) Peter Brolin	0
(Denmark) Frede Johansen	2
(Finland) Jarkko Komula	4
(Germany) Andreas Kröckel	1
(Northern Ireland) John Elder	4
(Norway) Terje Deras	3
(England) Martin Adams	4
(Belgium) Erik Clarys	2
(Netherlands) Raymond van Barneveld	4
(Cyprus) George Trypiniotis	0
(Finland) Marko Kantele	4
(Northern Ireland) John MaGowan	2
(Wales) Marshall James	4

4th Round (best of 7 legs)
(Netherlands) Roland Scholten	1
(Wales) Ritchie Davies	4
(Denmark) Bjarne Jensen	4
(Belgium) Tanguy Borra	2
(Germany) Colin Rice	2
(Scotland) Les Wallace	4
(England) Andy Fordham	4
(Wales) Martin Phillips	1
(Wales) Sean Palfrey	2
(Netherlands) Co Stompé	4
(Finland) Jarkko Komula	2
(Northern Ireland) John Elder	4
(England) Martin Adams	2
(Netherlands) Raymond van Barneveld	4
(Finland) Marko Kantele	2
(Wales) Marshall James	4

Quarter-finals (best of 7 legs)
(Wales) Ritchie Davies	4
(Denmark) Bjarne Jensen	1
(Scotland) Les Wallace	1
(England) Andy Fordham	4
(Netherlands) Co Stompé	4
(Northern Ireland) John Elder	1
(Netherlands) Raymond van Barneveld	2
(Wales) Marshall James	4

Semi-finals (best of 7 legs)
(Wales) Ritchie Davies	1
(England) Andy Fordham	4
Final (best of 7 legs)
(England) Andy Fordham	2
(Netherlands) Co Stompé	4
(Netherlands) Co Stompé	4
(Wales) Marshall James	2

== Men's Pairs ==
1st Round (best of 7 legs)
(Austria) Jerome Zeleny (Austria) Boris Hristovski
Bye
(Northern Ireland) John Elder (Northern Ireland) Brian Elder	4
(Isle of Man) Charlie Cover (Isle of Man) Paul Whitehead	0
(England) Andy Fordham (England) Martin Adams	4
(Switzerland) Urs Von Rufs (Switzerland) Rene Handschin	0
(Republic of Ireland) Seamus Gormley (Republic of Ireland) Brendan Grace
Bye
(Finland) Keivo Survonen (Finland) Marko Pusa	4
(Czech Republic) Jaroslav Zenisek (Czech Republic) Blaine Karst	1
(Germany) Bernd Hebecker (Germany) Andree Welge	4
(Italy) Maurizio Moretti (Italy) Loris Polese	2
(Sweden) Peter Brolin (Sweden) Stefan Nagy	3
(Belgium) Luc Vriesacker (Belgium) Chris van den Bergh	4
(Iceland) Throsdur Ingimarsson (Iceland) Thorgeir Gudmundsson
Bye
(Northern Ireland) John Neale (Northern Ireland) Tony Dawkins
Bye
(Netherlands) Richard Rietveld (Netherlands) Co Stompé	3
(Hungary) Attila Kulcar (Hungary) Tibor Kiss	4
(Scotland) Les Wallace (Scotland) Bob Taylor	4
(Denmark) Brian Buur (Denmark) Ole Jorgensen	2
(Cyprus) Demetris Georgiou (Cyprus) Ermos Korradou
Bye
(Malta) Charles Ghiller (Malta) Vincent Busuttil	4
(Latvia) Dzintars Salmins (Latvia) David Field	1
(Greece) Christos Padazopoulos (Greece) Paris Chloros	0
(Norway) Terje Deras (Norway) John Sandaker	4
(Wales) Sean Palfrey (Wales) Martin Phillips	4
(France) Pascal Fontaine (France) Jean-Luc Mortelec	1
(Faroe Islands) Mikael Mortensen (Faroe Islands) Petur Gronagard
Bye
(Wales) Ritchie Davies (Wales) Marshall James
Bye
(Austria) Franz Thaler (Austria) Axel Tschinkowitz	4
(Faroe Islands) Janus Jacobsen (Faroe Islands) Poul Poulsen	0
(Republic of Ireland) John Burke (Republic of Ireland) Jack McKenna	4
(Cyprus) Andrea Podilatas (Cyprus) George Trypiniotis	1
(Netherlands) Roland Scholten (Netherlands) Raymond van Barneveld
Bye
(Denmark) Bjarne Jensen (Denmark) Frede Johansen	4
(Gibraltar) George Federico (Gibraltar) Francis Taylor	2
(Iceland) Kristinn Kristinnsson (Iceland) Oil Sigurdson	1
(France) Stephane Dalancon (France) Cristian Le Borgne	4
(Malta) Godfrey Abela (Malta) John Demicoli	2
(Norway) Arne Sivertsen (Norway) Vidar Samuelsen	4
(Germany) Andreas Kröckel (Germany) Colin Rice
Bye
(England) Steve Beaton (England) Ronnie Baxter
Bye
(Finland) Marko Kantele (Finland) Jarkko Komula	3
(Scotland) Peter Johnstone (Scotland) Mike Veitch	4
(Hungary) Attila Port (Hungary) Levente Szekely	1
(Czech Republic) Oldrich Sulc (Czech Republic) Jaroslav Mottl	4
(Belgium) Tanguy Borra (Belgium) Erik Clarys
Bye
(Isle of Man) Paul Sertin (Isle of Man) Geoff Hurst	3
(Greece) Stelios Laskaris (Greece) Kyriakos Anastasiadis	4
(Switzerland) Beat Basler (Switzerland) Gaudenz Coray	1
(Latvia) Ivaers Adamson (Latvia) Uldis Erkis	4
(Sweden) Peter Sjoberg (Sweden) Nils-Gunnar Manshed	4
(Italy) Luca Falseti (Italy) Paolo Urbani	3
(Northern Ireland) John Magowan (Northern Ireland) Louis Doherty
Bye

2nd Round (best of 7 legs)
(Austria) Jerome Zeleny (Austria) Boris Hristovski	0
(Northern Ireland) John Elder (Northern Ireland) Brian Elder	4
(England) Andy Fordham (England) Martin Adams	4
(Republic of Ireland) Seamus Gormley (Republic of Ireland) Brendan Grace	3
(Finland) Keivo Survonen (Finland) Marko Pusa	4
(Germany) Bernd Hebecker (Germany) Andree Welge	1
(Belgium) Luc Vriesacker (Belgium) Chris van den Bergh	4
(Iceland) Throsdur Ingimarsson (Iceland) Thorgeir Gudmundsson	1
(Northern Ireland) John Neale (Northern Ireland) Tony Dawkins	1
(Hungary) Attila Kulcar (Hungary) Tibor Kiss	4
(Scotland) Les Wallace (Scotland) Bob Taylor	4
(Cyprus) Demetris Georgiou (Cyprus) Ermos Korradou	1
(Malta) Charles Ghiller (Malta) Vincent Busuttil	0
(Norway) Terje Deras (Norway) John Sandaker	4
(Wales) Sean Palfrey (Wales) Martin Phillips	4
(Faroe Islands) Mikael Mortensen (Faroe Islands) Petur Gronagard	3
(Wales) Ritchie Davies (Wales) Marshall James	4
(Austria) Franz Thaler (Austria) Axel Tschinkowitz	0
(Republic of Ireland) John Burke (Republic of Ireland) Jack McKenna	0
(Netherlands) Roland Scholten (Netherlands) Raymond van Barneveld	4
(Denmark) Bjarne Jensen (Denmark) Frede Johansen	4
(France) Stephane Dalancon (France) Cristian Le Borgne	0
(Norway) Arne Sivertsen (Norway) Vidar Samuelsen	1
(Germany) Andreas Kröckel (Germany) Colin Rice	4
(England) Steve Beaton (England) Ronnie Baxter	3
(Scotland) Peter Johnstone (Scotland) Mike Veitch	4
(Czech Republic) Oldrich Sulc (Czech Republic) Jaroslav Mottl	1
(Belgium) Tanguy Borra (Belgium) Erik Clarys	4
(Greece) Stelios Laskaris (Greece) Kyriakos Anastasiadis	2
(Latvia) Ivaers Adamson (Latvia) Uldis Erkis	4
(Sweden) Peter Sjoberg (Sweden) Nils-Gunnar Manshed	1
(Northern Ireland) John Magowan (Northern Ireland) Louis Doherty	4

3rd Round (best of 7 legs)
(Northern Ireland) John Elder (Northern Ireland) Brian Elder	1
(England) Andy Fordham (England) Martin Adams	4
(Finland) Keivo Survonen (Finland) Marko Pusa	4
(Belgium) Luc Vriesacker (Belgium) Chris van den Bergh	3
(Hungary) Attila Kulcar (Hungary) Tibor Kiss	0
(Scotland) Les Wallace (Scotland) Bob Taylor	4
(Norway) Terje Deras (Norway) John Sandaker	2
(Wales) Sean Palfrey (Wales) Martin Phillips	4
(Wales) Ritchie Davies (Wales) Marshall James	4
(Netherlands) Roland Scholten (Netherlands) Raymond van Barneveld	2
(Denmark) Bjarne Jensen (Denmark) Frede Johansen	4
(Germany) Andreas Kröckel (Germany) Colin Rice	3
(Scotland) Peter Johnstone (Scotland) Mike Veitch	4
(Belgium) Tanguy Borra (Belgium) Erik Clarys	3
(Latvia) Ivaers Adamson (Latvia) Uldis Erkis	1
(Northern Ireland) John Magowan (Northern Ireland) Louis Doherty	4

Quarter-finals (best of 7 legs)
(England) Andy Fordham (England) Martin Adams	4
(Finland) Keivo Survonen (Finland) Marko Pusa	1
(Scotland) Les Wallace (Scotland) Bob Taylor	1
(Wales) Sean Palfrey (Wales) Martin Phillips	4
(Wales) Ritchie Davies (Wales) Marshall James	4
(Denmark) Bjarne Jensen (Denmark) Frede Johansen	3
(Scotland) Peter Johnstone (Scotland) Mike Veitch	4
(Northern Ireland) John Magowan (Northern Ireland) Louis Doherty	0

Semi-finals (best of 7 legs)
(England) Andy Fordham (England) Martin Adams	2
(Wales) Sean Palfrey (Wales) Martin Phillips	4
(Wales) Ritchie Davies (Wales) Marshall James	2
(Scotland) Peter Johnstone (Scotland) Mike Veitch	4

Final (best of 7 legs)
(Wales) Sean Palfrey (Wales) Martin Phillips	4
(Scotland) Peter Johnstone (Scotland) Mike Veitch	2

== Men's team ==
Round Robin

Group A

Pos	Team	Pld	Win	Lose	LF	LA	+/-
1	England	3	3	0	27	14	+13
2	Denmark	3	2	1	25	17	+8
3	Finland	3	1	2	23	21	+2
4	Greece	3	0	3	4	27	-23

- England 9 - 7 Denmark
- England 9 - 7 Finland
- England 9 - 0 Greece
- Denmark 9 - 7 Finland
- Denmark 9 - 1 Greece
- Finland 9 - 3 Greece

Group B

Pos	Team	Pld	Win	Lose	LF	LA	+/-
1	Sweden	2	2	0	18	8	+10
2	Malta	2	1	1	14	13	+1
3	Italy	2	0	2	7	18	-11

- Sweden 9 - 5 Malta
- Sweden 9 - 3 Italy
- Malta 9 - 4 Italy

Group C

Pos	Team	Pld	Win	Lose	LF	LA	+/-
1	Scotland	2	2	0	18	1	+17
2	Iceland	2	1	1	10	11	-1
3	Faroe Islands	2	0	2	2	18	-16

- Scotland 9 - 1 Iceland
- Scotland 9 - 0 Faroe Islands
- Iceland 9 - 2 Faroe Islands

Group D

Pos	Team	Pld	Win	Lose	LF	LA	+/-
1	Wales	2	2	0	18	2	+16
2	Switzerland	2	1	1	11	12	-1
3	Czech Republic	2	0	2	3	18	-15

- Wales 9 - 3 Switzerland
- Wales 9 - 0 Czech Republic
- Switzerland 9 - 3 Czech Republic

Group E

Pos	Team	Pld	Win	Lose	LF	LA	+/-
1	Netherlands	2	2	0	18	7	+11
2	Hungary	2	1	1	12	13	-1
3	Austria	2	0	2	8	18	-10

- Netherlands 9 - 3 Hungary
- Netherlands 9 - 4 Austria
- Hungary 9 - 4 Austria

Group F

Pos	Team	Pld	Win	Lose	LF	LA	+/-
1	Germany	2	2	0	18	2	+16
2	Norway	2	1	1	10	12	-2
3	Latvia	2	0	2	4	18	-14

- Germany 9 - 1 Norway
- Germany 9 - 1 Latvia
- Norway 9 - 3 Latvia

Group G

Pos	Team	Pld	Win	Lose	LF	LA	+/-
1	Belgium	2	2	0	18	7	+11
2	Gibraltar	2	1	1	15	17	-2
3	Cyprus	2	0	2	9	18	-9

- Belgium 9 - 0 Gibraltar
- Belgium 9 - 2 Cyprus
- Gibraltar 9 - 2 Cyprus

Group H

Pos	Team	Pld	Win	Lose	LF	LA	+/-
1	Northern Ireland	3	3	0	27	10	+17
2	(Republic of Ireland) Ireland	3	2	1	22	16	+6
3	France	3	1	2	18	26	-8
4	Isle of Man	3	0	3	12	27	-15

- Northern Ireland 9 - 4 (Republic of Ireland) Ireland
- Northern Ireland 9 - 4 France
- Northern Ireland 9 - 2 Isle of Man
- (Republic of Ireland) Ireland 9 - 5 France
- (Republic of Ireland) Ireland 9 - 2 Isle of Man
- France 9 - 8 Isle of Man

Knock Out

Last 16 (best of 17 legs)
A1	England	9
G2	Gibraltar	0
B1	Sweden	6
H2	(Republic of Ireland) Ireland	9
C1	Scotland	9
E2	Hungary	5
D1	Wales	9
F2	Norway	0
E1	Netherlands	9
C2	Iceland	2
F1	Germany	9
D2	Switzerland	2
G1	Belgium	9
A2	Denmark	7
H1	Northern Ireland	9
B2	Malta	4

Quarter-finals (best of 17 legs)
A1	England	9
H2	(Republic of Ireland) Ireland	2
C1	Scotland	9
D1	Wales	7
E1	Netherlands	9
F1	Germany	7
G1	Belgium	9
H1	Northern Ireland	4

Semi-finals (best of 17 legs)
A1	England	9
C1	Scotland	7
E1	Netherlands	3
H1	Belgium	9

Final (best of 17 legs)
A1	England	9
H1	Belgium	5

== Woman's singles ==
1st Round (best of 7 legs)
(Switzerland) Corrine Wittwer
Bye
(Finland) Heli Ohvavainen	4
(Austria) Michaela Blahaus	0
(England) Trina Gulliver
Bye
(Italy) Carla Constantini
Bye
(Republic of Ireland) Maureen Kelly	2
(Scotland) Donna Robertson	4
(Norway) Tove Vestrum
Bye
(Denmark) Annette Hakonsen	4
(Cyprus) Teresa Mills	1
(Gibraltar) Sue Vinent
Bye
(Hungary) Ibolya Pentek
Bye
(Netherlands) Mieke de Boer	4
(Sweden) Kristina Korpii	0
(Latvia) Sunny Field
Bye
(Czech Republic) Vladimira Dudkova
Bye
(Germany) Heike Ernst	4
(Isle of Man) Linda Jordon	0
(France) Isabelle Caron
Bye
(Northern Ireland) Denise Cassidy
Bye
(Wales) Gaynor Williams
Bye
(Austria) Gabrielle Klem
Bye
(Northern Ireland) Grace Crane	4
(Hungary) Timea Dobos	3
(Netherlands) Valerie Maytum
Bye
(Republic of Ireland) Marion McDermott
Bye
(Switzerland) Lisa Huber	2
(Norway) Mette Engen-Hansen	4
(Sweden) Linda Nilsson
Bye
(Latvia) Laura Aboltina	4
(France) Virginie Vinet	2
(Scotland) Anne Kirk
Bye
(Denmark) Ann-Louise Peters
Bye
(England) Mandy Solomons	4
(Czech Republic) Kveta Drahuska	0
(Wales) Sandra Greatbatch
Bye
(Cyprus) Alexia Demetriou
Bye
(Italy) Loredana Brumetz	4
(Gibraltar) Sue Parody	1
(Isle of Man) Jackie Sayle
Bye
(Finland) Tarja Salminen
Bye
(Germany) Bianka Strauch
Bye

2nd Round (best of 7 legs)
(Switzerland) Corrine Wittwer	0
(Finland) Heli Ohvavainen	4
(England) Trina Gulliver	4
(Italy) Carla Constantini	0
(Scotland) Donna Robertson	0
(Norway) Tove Vestrum	4
(Denmark) Annette Hakonsen	4
(Gibraltar) Sue Vinent	0
(Hungary) Ibolya Pentek	0
(Netherlands) Mieke de Boer	4
(Latvia) Sunny Field	0
(Czech Republic) Vladimira Dudkova	4
(Germany) Heike Ernst	4
(France) Isabelle Caron	2
(Northern Ireland) Denise Cassidy	4
(Wales) Gaynor Williams	1
(Austria) Gabrielle Klem	1
(Northern Ireland) Grace Crane	4
(Netherlands) Valerie Maytum	4
(Republic of Ireland) Marion McDermott	3
(Norway) Mette Engen-Hansen	4
(Sweden) Linda Nilsson	1
(Latvia) Laura Aboltina	0
(Scotland) Anne Kirk	4
(Denmark) Ann-Louise Peters	3
(England) Mandy Solomons	4
(Wales) Sandra Greatbatch	4
(Cyprus) Alexia Demetriou	0
(Italy) Loredana Brumetz	4
(Isle of Man) Jackie Sayle	1
(Finland) Tarja Salminen	4
(Germany) Bianka Strauch	3

3rd Round (best of 7 legs)
(Finland) Heli Ohvavainen	0
(England) Trina Gulliver	4
(Sweden) Tove Vestrum	3
(Denmark) Annette Hakonsen	4
(Netherlands) Mieke de Boer	4
(Czech Republic) Vladimira Dudkova	0
(Germany) Heike Ernst	2
(Northern Ireland) Denise Cassidy	4
(Northern Ireland) Grace Crane	2
(Netherlands) Valerie Maytum	4
(Norway) Mette Engen-Hansen	4
(Scotland) Anne Kirk	2
(England) Mandy Solomons	4
(Wales) Sandra Greatbatch	2
(Italy) Loredana Brumetz	0
(Finland) Tarja Salminen	4

Quarter-finals (best of 7 legs)
(England) Trina Gulliver	4
(Denmark) Annette Hakonsen	0
(Netherlands) Mieke de Boer	2
(Northern Ireland) Denise Cassidy	4
(Netherlands) Valerie Maytum	0
(Norway) Mette Engen-Hansen	4
(England) Mandy Solomons	4
(Finland) Tarja Salminen	3

Semi-finals (best of 7 legs)
(England) Trina Gulliver	3
(Northern Ireland) Denise Cassidy	4
(Norway) Mette Engen-Hansen	2
(England) Mandy Solomons	4

Final (best of 7 legs)
(Northern Ireland) Denise Cassidy	4
(England) Mandy Solomons	3

== Woman's Pairs ==
Round Robin

Group A

Pos	Team	Pld	Win	Lose	LF	LA	+/-
1	(England) Mandy Solomons (England) Trina Gulliver	5	5	0	20	6	+14
2	(Denmark) Ann-Louise Peters (Denmark) Annette Hakonsen	5	4	1	17	10	+7
3	(Germany) Bianka Strauch (Germany) Heike Ernst	5	3	2	15	10	+5
4	(Isle of Man) Linda Jordon (Isle of Man) Jackie Sayle	5	2	3	10	14	-4
5	(Norway) Mette Engen-Hansen (Norway) Tove Vestrum	5	1	4	10	17	-7
6	(Latvia) Laura Aboltina (Latvia) Sunny Field	5	0	5	5	20	-15

- (England) Mandy Solomons & Trina Gulliver 4 - 1 (Denmark) Ann-Louise Peters & Annette Hakonsen
- (England) Mandy Solomons & Trina Gulliver 4 - 3 (Germany) Bianka Strauch & Heike Ernst
- (England) Mandy Solomons & Trina Gulliver 4 - 0 (Isle of Man) Linda Jordon & Jackie Sayle
- (England) Mandy Solomons & Trina Gulliver 4 - 1 (Norway) Mette Engen-Hansen & Tove Vestrum
- (England) Mandy Solomons & Trina Gulliver 4 - 1 (Latvia) Laura Aboltina & Sunny Field
- (Denmark) Ann-Louise Peters & Annette Hakonsen 4 - 0 (Germany) Bianka Strauch & Heike Ernst
- (Denmark) Ann-Louise Peters & Annette Hakonsen 4 - 1 (Isle of Man) Linda Jordon & Jackie Sayle
- (Denmark) Ann-Louise Peters & Annette Hakonsen 4 - 3 (Norway) Mette Engen-Hansen & Tove Vestrum
- (Denmark) Ann-Louise Peters & Annette Hakonsen 4 - 2 (Latvia) Laura Aboltina & Sunny Field
- (Germany) Bianka Strauch & Heike Ernst 4 - 1 (Isle of Man) Linda Jordon & Jackie Sayle
- (Germany) Bianka Strauch & Heike Ernst 4 - 1 (Norway) Mette Engen-Hansen & Tove Vestrum
- (Germany) Bianka Strauch & Heike Ernst 4 - 0 (Latvia) Laura Aboltina & Sunny Field
- (Isle of Man) Linda Jordon & Jackie Sayle 4 - 1 (Norway) Mette Engen-Hansen & Tove Vestrum
- (Isle of Man) Linda Jordon & Jackie Sayle 4 - 1 (Latvia) Laura Aboltina & Sunny Field
- (Norway) Mette Engen-Hansen & Tove Vestrum 4 - 1 (Latvia) Laura Aboltina & Sunny Field

Group B

Pos	Team	Pld	Win	Lose	LF	LA	+/-
1	(Northern Ireland) Denise Cassidy (Northern Ireland) Grace Crane	4	4	0	16	4	+12
2	(Sweden) Linda Nilsson (Sweden) Kristina Korpii	4	3	1	13	5	+8
3	(Czech Republic) Kveta Drahuska (Czech Republic) Vladimira Dudkova	4	2	2	10	12	-2
4	(Italy) Loredana Brumetz (Italy) Carla Constantini	4	1	3	8	15	-7
5	(Gibraltar) Sue Parody (Gibraltar) Sue Vinent	4	0	4	5	16	-11

- (Northern Ireland) Denise Cassidy & Grace Crane 4 - 1 (Sweden) Linda Nilsson & Kristina Korpii
- (Northern Ireland) Denise Cassidy & Grace Crane 4 - 1 (Czech Republic) Kveta Drahuska & Vladimira Dudkova
- (Northern Ireland) Denise Cassidy & Grace Crane 4 - 1 (Italy) Loredana Brumetz & Carla Constantini
- (Northern Ireland) Denise Cassidy & Grace Crane 4 - 1 (Gibraltar) Sue Parody & Sue Vinent
- (Sweden) Linda Nilsson & Kristina Korpii 4 - 1 (Czech Republic) Kveta Drahuska & Vladimira Dudkova
- (Sweden) Linda Nilsson & Kristina Korpii 4 - 0 (Italy) Loredana Brumetz & Carla Constantini
- (Sweden) Linda Nilsson & Kristina Korpii 4 - 0 (Gibraltar) Sue Parody & Sue Vinent
- (Czech Republic) Kveta Drahuska & Vladimira Dudkova 4 - 3 (Italy) Loredana Brumetz & Carla Constantini
- (Czech Republic) Kveta Drahuska & Vladimira Dudkova 4 - 1 (Gibraltar) Sue Parody & Sue Vinent
- (Italy) Loredana Brumetz & Carla Constantini 4 - 3 (Gibraltar) Sue Parody & Sue Vinent

Group C

Pos	Team	Pld	Win	Lose	LF	LA	+/-
1	(Scotland) Anne Kirk (Scotland) Donna Robertson	4	4	0	16	4	+12
2	(Switzerland) Lisa Huber (Switzerland) Corrine Wittwer	4	3	1	12	11	+1
3	(Netherlands) Mieke de Boer (Netherlands) Valerie Maytum	4	2	2	12	8	+4
4	(Hungary) Timea Dobos (Hungary) Ibolya Pentek	4	1	3	6	12	-6
5	(Cyprus) Alexia Demetriou (Cyprus) Teresa Mills	4	0	4	5	16	-11

- (Scotland) Anne Kirk & Donna Robertson 4 - 0 (Switzerland) Lisa Huber & Corrine Wittwer
- (Scotland) Anne Kirk & Donna Robertson 4 - 2 (Netherlands) Mieke de Boer & Valerie Maytum
- (Scotland) Anne Kirk & Donna Robertson 4 - 0 (Hungary) Timea Dobos & Ibolya Pentek
- (Scotland) Anne Kirk & Donna Robertson 4 - 2 (Cyprus) Alexia Demetriou & Teresa Mills
- (Switzerland) Lisa Huber & Corrine Wittwer 4 - 2 (Netherlands) Mieke de Boer & Valerie Maytum
- (Switzerland) Lisa Huber & Corrine Wittwer 4 - 2 (Hungary) Timea Dobos & Ibolya Pentek
- (Switzerland) Lisa Huber & Corrine Wittwer 4 - 3 (Cyprus) Alexia Demetriou & Teresa Mills
- (Netherlands) Mieke de Boer & Valerie Maytum 4 - 0 (Hungary) Timea Dobos & Ibolya Pentek
- (Netherlands) Mieke de Boer & Valerie Maytum 4 - 0 (Cyprus) Alexia Demetriou & Teresa Mills
- (Hungary) Timea Dobos & Ibolya Pentek 4 - 0 (Cyprus) Alexia Demetriou & Teresa Mills

Group D

Pos	Team	Pld	Win	Lose	LF	LA	+/-
1	(Wales) Sandra Greatbatch (Wales) Gaynor Williams	4	3	1	14	4	+10
2	(Republic of Ireland) Marion McDermott (Republic of Ireland) Maureen Kelly	4	3	1	15	7	+8
3	(Finland) Heli Ohvavainen (Finland) Tarja Salminen	4	3	1	12	8	+4
4	(France) Virginie Vinet (France) Isabelle Caron	4	1	3	6	14	-8
5	(Austria) Gabrielle Klem (Austria) Michaela Blahaus	4	0	4	2	16	-14

- (Wales) Sandra Greatbatch & Gaynor Williams 4 - 0 (Finland) Heli Ohvavainen & Tarja Salminen
- (Wales) Sandra Greatbatch & Gaynor Williams 4 - 0 (France) Virginie Vinet & Isabelle Caron
- (Wales) Sandra Greatbatch & Gaynor Williams 4 - 0 (Austria) Gabrielle Klem & Michaela Blahaus
- (Republic of Ireland) Marion McDermott & Maureen Kelly 4 - 2 (Wales) Sandra Greatbatch & Gaynor Williams
- (Republic of Ireland) Marion McDermott & Maureen Kelly 4 - 1 (France) Virginie Vinet & Isabelle Caron
- (Republic of Ireland) Marion McDermott & Maureen Kelly 4 - 0 (Austria) Gabrielle Klem & Michaela Blahaus
- (Finland) Heli Ohvavainen & Tarja Salminen 4 - 3 (Republic of Ireland) Marion McDermott & Maureen Kelly
- (Finland) Heli Ohvavainen & Tarja Salminen 4 - 1 (France) Virginie Vinet & Isabelle Caron
- (Finland) Heli Ohvavainen & Tarja Salminen 4 - 0 (Austria) Gabrielle Klem & Michaela Blahaus
- (France) Virginie Vinet & Isabelle Caron 4 - 2 (Austria) Gabrielle Klem & Michaela Blahaus

Knock Out

Last 16 (best of 7 legs)
A1	(England) Mandy Solomons (England) Trina Gulliver	4
D4	(France) Virginie Vinet (France) Isabelle Caron	0
C2	(Switzerland) Lisa Huber (Switzerland) Corrine Wittwer	4
B3	(Czech Republic) Kveta Drahuska (Czech Republic) Vladimira Dudkova	0
D1	(Wales) Sandra Greatbatch (Wales) Gaynor Williams	4
A3	(Germany) Bianka Strauch (Germany) Heike Ernst	1
C4	(Hungary) Timea Dobos (Hungary) Ibolya Pentek	0
B1	(Northern Ireland) Denise Cassidy (Northern Ireland) Grace Crane	4
C1	(Scotland) Anne Kirk (Scotland) Donna Robertson	4
B4	(Italy) Loredana Brumetz (Italy) Carla Constantini	2
D3	(Finland) Heli Ohvavainen (Finland) Tarja Salminen	4
A2	(Denmark) Ann-Louise Peters (Denmark) Annette Hakonsen	2
B2	(Sweden) Linda Nilsson (Sweden) Kristina Korpii	4
C3	(Netherlands) Mieke de Boer (Netherlands) Valerie Maytum	2
A4	(Isle of Man) Linda Jordon (Isle of Man) Jackie Sayle	0
D2	(Republic of Ireland) Marion McDermott (Republic of Ireland) Maureen Kelly	4

Quarter-finals (best of 7 legs)
A1	(England) Mandy Solomons (England) Trina Gulliver	4
C2	(Switzerland) Lisa Huber (Switzerland) Corrine Wittwer	0
D1	(Wales) Sandra Greatbatch (Wales) Gaynor Williams	3
B1	(Northern Ireland) Denise Cassidy (Northern Ireland) Grace Crane	4
C1	(Scotland) Anne Kirk (Scotland) Donna Robertson	3
D3	(Finland) Heli Ohvavainen (Finland) Tarja Salminen	4
B2	(Sweden) Linda Nilsson (Sweden) Kristina Korpii	4
D2	(Republic of Ireland) Marion McDermott (Republic of Ireland) Maureen Kelly	2

Semi-finals (best of 7 legs)
A1	(England) Mandy Solomons (England) Trina Gulliver	4
B1	(Northern Ireland) Denise Cassidy (Northern Ireland) Grace Crane	1
D3	(Finland) Heli Ohvavainen (Finland) Tarja Salminen	2
B2	(Sweden) Linda Nilsson (Sweden) Kristina Korpii	4

Final (best of 7 legs)
A1	(England) Mandy Solomons (England) Trina Gulliver	4
B2	(Sweden) Linda Nilsson (Sweden) Kristina Korpii	2
