= 2000 WDF Europe Cup =

Tournament information
- Venue: Koningshof NH
- Location: Veldhoven
- Country: Netherlands
- Established: 10 Aug-12 Aug
- Organisation(s): WDF
- Format: Legs

Champion(s)
- Singles (Northern Ireland) Mitchell Crooks (men's singles); Trina Gulliver (women's singles); Pairs; Raymond van Barneveld & Co Stompé (men's pairs) (Netherlands) Francis Hoenselaar & Karin Krappen (women's pairs); Team; England (men's team); Overall; England (men's overall); Netherlands (women's overall)

The 2000 WDF Europe Cup was the 12th edition of the WDF Europe Cup darts tournament, organised by the World Darts Federation. It was held in Veldhoven, Netherlands from 10 Aug-12 Aug.

== Entered teams ==
22 countries/associations entered a men's selection in the event.

19 countries/associations entered a women's selection in the event.

Nr.	Country	Men's Selection
1	Austria	Arnold Anderwald, Axel Tschinkowitz, Franz Thaler, Mensur Suljović
2	Belgium	Chris van den Bergh, Luc Vriesacker, Tanguy Borra, Daniel Bottelbergs
3	Cyprus	Demetris Georgiou, Floros Ecnomou, Ermos Korradou, George Trypiniotis
4	Denmark	Per Laursen, Frede Johansen, Brian Buur, Stig Jørgensen
5	England	Kevin Painter, Mervyn King, Martin Adams, Ted Hankey
6	Finland	Jarkko Komula, Ulf Ceder, Kim Viljanen, Marko Pusa
7	France	Cyril Brosse, Michel Boulet, Laurent Saillour, Gwen Cornec
8	Germany	Colin Rice, Michael Rosenauer, Tomas Seyler, Marco Blesing
9	Gibraltar	Dylan Duo, Tony Dawkins, George Federico, David Francis
10	Greece	Paris Chloros, Christos Padazopoulos, Panagiotis Zalonis, John Michael
11	Hungary	Nándor Bezzeg, Roland Csermely, Attila Boszok, Attila Port
12	Ireland	Dennis McCarthy, Jason Kavanagh, Des Byrne, Sean McGowan
13	Isle of Man	Robbie Cannell, Paul Sertin, David Western, Gordon Gregory
14	Italy	Luca Falseti, Loris Polese, Sergio Pettarini, Sergei Vodicar
15	Malta	Charles Ghiller, Emmanuel Ciantar, Godfrey Abela, Joe Caruana
16	Netherlands	Frans Harmsen, Raymond van Barneveld, Co Stompé, Arjan Moen
17	Northern Ireland	Alan Carlisle, Paul Watton, Mitchell Crooks, John Elder
18	Norway	Arne Sivertsen, Vidar Samuelsen, John Sandaker, Per-Otto Jacobsen
19	Scotland	Gary Anderson, Bob Taylor, Mike Veitch, Alan Brown
20	Sweden	Peter Sjoberg, Jari Ylikauppila, Ronny Rohr, Mikael Armbladh
21	Switzerland	Urs Von Rufs, Peter Schonauer, Walter Tschudin, Gaudenz Coray
22	Wales	Robert Hughes, Ritchie Davies, Martin Phillips, Richard Herbert

Nr.	Country	Woman's Selection
1	Austria	Gerlinde Hristovski & Monika Schartner
2	Belgium	Vicky Pruim & Sandra Pollet
3	Denmark	Ann-Louise Peters & Annette Hakonsen
4	England	Apylee Jones & Trina Gulliver
5	Finland	Satu Ikonen & Tarja Salminen
6	France	Anita Chausson & Cathrine Robin
7	Germany	Bianka Strauch & Heike Ernst
8	Greece	Maria Poulidou & Polita Varouxi
9	Hungary	Nora Kautzky & Marene Racz
10	Ireland	Olive McIntyre & Sandra O'Flaherty
11	Isle of Man	Linda Jordon & Margaret Kelly
12	Italy	Mojca Humar & Sonia Moretti
13	Netherlands	Karin Krappen & Francis Hoenselaar
14	Northern Ireland	Denise Cassidy & Norma Irvine
15	Norway	Tove Vestrum & Karin Nordahl
16	Scotland	Anne Kirk & Jackie Sharpe
17	Sweden	Carina Ekberg & Kristina Korpii
18	Switzerland	Sabine Beutler & Lisa Huber
19	Wales	Linda Rogers-Pickett & Sandra Greatbatch

== Men's singles ==
1st Round (best of 7 legs)
(Greece) Panagiotis Zalonis	3
(Norway) John Sandaker	4
(England) Kevin Painter	4
(Gibraltar) Dylan Duo	0
(Scotland) Bob Taylor
Bye
(Austria) Axel Tschinkowitz
Bye
(Denmark) Brian Buur	4
(Sweden) Ronny Rohr	0
(Wales) Martin Phillips
Bye
(Isle of Man) Paul Sertin	4
(France) Cyril Brosse	3
(Belgium) Luc Vriesacker
Bye
(Switzerland) Walter Tschudin	4
(Malta) Emmanuel Ciantar	3
(Germany) Michael Rosenauer
Bye
(Hungary) Attila Boszok
Bye
(Cyprus) George Trypiniotis
Bye
(Republic of Ireland) Jason Kavanagh	1
(Netherlands) Raymond van Barneveld	4
(Finland) Marko Pusa
Bye
(Northern Ireland) Mitchell Crooks	4
(Gibraltar) George Federico	3
(Italy) Luca Falseti
Bye
(Greece) Paris Chloros	2
(Italy) Luca Falseti	4
(Sweden) Mikael Armbladh
Bye
(Denmark) Frede Johansen
Bye
(France) Gwen Cornec
Bye
(Belgium) Chris van den Bergh	4
(Hungary) Roland Csermely	3
(Isle of Man) Gordon Gregory
Bye
(Scotland) Gary Anderson	4
(Cyprus) Floros Ecnomou	1
(Norway) Vidar Samuelsen
Bye
(Wales) Richard Herbert	4
(Germany) Marco Blesing	2
(Malta) Godfrey Abela	4
(Gibraltar) Tony Dawkins	1
(England) Ted Hankey
Bye
(Switzerland) Gaudenz Coray
Bye
(Austria) Mensur Suljović	4
(Finland) Kim Viljanen	3
(Netherlands) Co Stompé
Bye
(Northern Ireland) Alan Carlisle
Bye
(Republic of Ireland) Dennis McCarthy
Bye
(Northern Ireland) John Elder	4
(Greece) John Michael	0
(Wales) Robert Hughes
Bye
(Netherlands) Frans Harmsen
Bye
(Hungary) Nándor Bezzeg	4
(Gibraltar) David Francis	2
(England) Martin Adams	4
(Cyprus) Ermos Korradou	0
(Sweden) Peter Sjoberg
Bye
(Isle of Man) David Western	0
(Belgium) Daniel Bottelbergs	4
(Finland) Jarkko Komula
Bye
(France) Michel Boulet	4
(Switzerland) Peter Schonauer	3
(Republic of Ireland) Sean McGowan
Bye
(Germany) Colin Rice
Bye
(Norway) Arne Sivertsen
Bye
(Austria) Franz Thaler	4
(Italy) Loris Polese	1
(Denmark) Stig Jørgensen
Bye
(Scotland) Alan Brown
Bye
(Malta) Charles Ghiller
Bye
(Norway) Per-Otto Jacobsen	4
(Hungary) Attila Port	0
(Italy) Sergei Vodicar
Bye
(Wales) Ritchie Davies
Bye
(Greece) Christos Padazopoulos
Bye
(Northern Ireland) Paul Watton	4
(Denmark) Per Laursen	2
(Switzerland) Urs Von Rufs
Bye
(England) Mervyn King	4
(Republic of Ireland) Des Byrne	0
(France) Laurent Saillour
Bye
(Germany) Tomas Seyler	4
(Sweden) Jari Ylikauppila	2
(Malta) Joe Caruana
Bye
(Belgium) Tanguy Borra
Bye
(Cyprus) Demetris Georgiou
Bye
(Scotland) Mike Veitch	4
(Finland) Ulf Ceder	1
(Austria) Arnold Anderwald
Bye
(Netherlands) Arjan Moen
Bye
(Isle of Man) Robbie Cannell
Bye

2nd Round (best of 7 legs)
(Norway) John Sandaker	2
(England) Kevin Painter	4
(Scotland) Bob Taylor	4
(Austria) Axel Tschinkowitz	0
(Denmark) Brian Buur	4
(Wales) Martin Phillips	2
(Isle of Man) Paul Sertin	2
(Belgium) Luc Vriesacker	4
(Switzerland) Walter Tschudin	2
(Germany) Michael Rosenauer	4
(Hungary) Attila Boszok	4
(Cyprus) George Trypiniotis	3
(Netherlands) Raymond van Barneveld	3
(Finland) Marko Pusa	4
(Northern Ireland) Mitchell Crooks	4
(Italy) Luca Falseti	3
(Italy) Sergio Pettarini	3
(Sweden) Mikael Armbladh	4
(Denmark) Frede Johansen	4
(France) Gwen Cornec	1
(Belgium) Chris van den Bergh	4
(Isle of Man) Gordon Gregory	3
(Scotland) Gary Anderson	0
(Norway) Vidar Samuelsen	4
(Wales) Richard Herbert	4
(Malta) Godfrey Abela	0
(England) Ted Hankey	4
(Switzerland) Gaudenz Coray	3
(Austria) Mensur Suljović	4
(Netherlands) Co Stompé	3
(Northern Ireland) Alan Carlisle	4
(Republic of Ireland) Dennis McCarthy	3
(Northern Ireland) John Elder	3
(Wales) Robert Hughes	4
(Netherlands) Frans Harmsen	4
(Hungary) Nándor Bezzeg	1
(England) Martin Adams	4
(Sweden) Peter Sjoberg	1
(Belgium) Daniel Bottelbergs	0
(Finland) Jarkko Komula	4
(France) Michel Boulet	0
(Republic of Ireland) Sean McGowan	4
(Germany) Colin Rice	4
(Norway) Arne Sivertsen	1
(Austria) Franz Thaler	3
(Denmark) Stig Jørgensen	4
(Scotland) Alan Brown	4
(Malta) Charles Ghiller	3
(Norway) Per-Otto Jacobsen	1
(Italy) Sergei Vodicar	4
(Wales) Ritchie Davies	4
(Greece) Christos Padazopoulos	1
(Northern Ireland) Paul Watton	4
(Switzerland) Urs Von Rufs	2
(England) Mervyn King	4
(France) Laurent Saillour	0
(Germany) Tomas Seyler	4
(Malta) Joe Caruana	0
(Belgium) Tanguy Borra	4
(Cyprus) Demetris Georgiou	1
(Scotland) Mike Veitch	4
(Austria) Arnold Anderwald	1
(Netherlands) Arjan Moen	4
(Isle of Man) Robbie Cannell	1

3rd Round (best of 7 legs)
(England) Kevin Painter	4
(Scotland) Bob Taylor	0
(Denmark) Brian Buur	4
(Belgium) Luc Vriesacker	1
(Germany) Michael Rosenauer	4
(Hungary) Attila Boszok	3
(Finland) Marko Pusa	1
(Northern Ireland) Mitchell Crooks	4
(Sweden) Mikael Armbladh	2
(Denmark) Frede Johansen	4
(Belgium) Chris van den Bergh	4
(Norway) Vidar Samuelsen	0
(Wales) Richard Herbert	4
(England) Ted Hankey	3
(Austria) Mensur Suljović	4
(Northern Ireland) Alan Carlisle	0
(Wales) Robert Hughes	0
(Netherlands) Frans Harmsen	4
(England) Martin Adams	4
(Finland) Jarkko Komula	0
(Republic of Ireland) Sean McGowan	4
(Germany) Colin Rice	2
(Denmark) Stig Jørgensen	4
(Scotland) Alan Brown	0
(Italy) Sergei Vodicar	2
(Wales) Ritchie Davies	4
(Northern Ireland) Paul Watton	0
(England) Mervyn King	4
(Germany) Tomas Seyler	3
(Belgium) Tanguy Borra	4
(Scotland) Mike Veitch	2
(Netherlands) Arjan Moen	4

4th Round (best of 7 legs)
(England) Kevin Painter	2
(Denmark) Brian Buur	4
(Germany) Michael Rosenauer	3
(Northern Ireland) Mitchell Crooks	4
(Denmark) Frede Johansen	4
(Belgium) Chris van den Bergh	1
(Wales) Richard Herbert	3
(Austria) Mensur Suljović	4
(Netherlands) Frans Harmsen	2
(England) Martin Adams	4
(Republic of Ireland) Sean McGowan	4
(Denmark) Stig Jørgensen	2
(Wales) Ritchie Davies	4
(England) Mervyn King	0
(Belgium) Tanguy Borra	0
(Netherlands) Arjan Moen	4

Quarter-finals (best of 7 legs)
(Denmark) Brian Buur	2
(Northern Ireland) Mitchell Crooks	4
(Denmark) Frede Johansen	4
(Austria) Mensur Suljović	1
(England) Martin Adams	1
(Republic of Ireland) Sean McGowan	4
(Wales) Ritchie Davies	4
(Netherlands) Arjan Moen	1

Semi-finals (best of 7 legs)
(Northern Ireland) Mitchell Crooks	4
(Denmark) Frede Johansen	0
Final (best of 7 legs)
(Northern Ireland) Mitchell Crooks	4
(Wales) Ritchie Davies	2
(Republic of Ireland) Sean McGowan	3
(Wales) Ritchie Davies	4

== Men's Pairs ==
1st Round (best of 7 legs)
(Scotland) Mike Veitch (Scotland) Alan Brown	4
(Hungary) Attila Boszok (Hungary) Attila Port	0
(Switzerland) Peter Schonauer (Switzerland) Urs Von Rufs
Bye
(Wales) Robert Hughes (Wales) Martin Phillips	4
(Gibraltar) George Federico (Gibraltar) Tony Dawkins	3
(Italy) Luca Falseti (Italy) Loris Polese
Bye
(Germany) Marco Blesing (Germany) Michael Rosenauer	2
(Malta) Emmanuel Ciantar (Malta) Godfrey Abela	4
(Isle of Man) Gordon Gregory (Isle of Man) Robbie Cannell
Bye
(Finland) Marko Pusa (Finland) Jarkko Komula	4
(Republic of Ireland) Dennis McCarthy (Republic of Ireland) Jason Kavanagh	1
(Austria) Axel Tschinkowitz (Austria) Mensur Suljović
Bye
(England) Ted Hankey (England) Mervyn King	4
(Northern Ireland) John Elder (Northern Ireland) Alan Carlisle	1
(Sweden) Ronny Rohr (Sweden) Jari Ylikauppila
Bye
(Belgium) Tanguy Borra (Belgium) Chris van den Bergh
Bye
(Denmark) Brian Buur (Denmark) Per Laursen
Bye
(Norway) Vidar Samuelsen (Norway) Per-Otto Jacobsen	1
(France) Cyril Brosse (France) Laurent Saillour	4
(Greece) John Michael (Greece) Paris Chloros
Bye
(Netherlands) Arjan Moen (Netherlands) Frans Harmsen
Bye
(Cyprus) Demetris Georgiou (Cyprus) Ermos Korradou
Bye
(Netherlands) Co Stompé (Netherlands) Raymond van Barneveld	4
(Belgium) Daniel Bottelbergs (Belgium) Luc Vriesacker	1
(France) Gwen Cornec (France) Michel Boulet
Bye
(England) Kevin Painter (England) Martin Adams
Bye
(Norway) John Sandaker (Norway) Arne Sivertsen
Bye
(Italy) Sergio Pettarini (Italy) Sergei Vodicar	4
(Isle of Man) Paul Sertin (Isle of Man) David Western	1
(Republic of Ireland) Sean McGowan (Republic of Ireland) Des Byrne
Bye
(Denmark) Stig Jørgensen (Denmark) Frede Johansen	2
(Switzerland) Gaudenz Coray (Switzerland) Walter Tschudin	4
(Finland) Ulf Ceder (Finland) Kim Viljanen
Bye
(Wales) Richard Herbert (Wales) Ritchie Davies	3
(Austria) Franz Thaler (Austria) Arnold Anderwald	4
(Hungary) Nándor Bezzeg (Hungary) Roland Csermely
Bye
(Northern Ireland) Mitchell Crooks (Northern Ireland) Paul Watton	4
(Gibraltar) Dylan Duo (Gibraltar) David Francis	0
(Malta) Joe Caruana (Malta) Charles Ghiller
Bye
(Sweden) Peter Sjoberg (Sweden) Mikael Armbladh
Bye
(Greece) Panagiotis Zalonis (Greece) Christos Padazopoulos
Bye
(Scotland) Bob Taylor (Scotland) Gary Anderson
Bye
(Germany) Tomas Seyler (Germany) Colin Rice
Bye

2nd Round (best of 7 legs)
(Scotland) Mike Veitch (Scotland) Alan Brown	4
(Switzerland) Peter Schonauer (Switzerland) Urs Von Rufs	2
(Wales) Robert Hughes (Wales) Martin Phillips	4
(Italy) Luca Falseti (Italy) Loris Polese	0
(Malta) Emmanuel Ciantar (Malta) Godfrey Abela	4
(Isle of Man) Gordon Gregory (Isle of Man) Robbie Cannell	1
(Finland) Marko Pusa (Finland) Jarkko Komula	2
(Austria) Axel Tschinkowitz (Austria) Mensur Suljović	4
(England) Ted Hankey (England) Mervyn King	4
(Sweden) Ronny Rohr (Sweden) Jari Ylikauppila	1
(Belgium) Tanguy Borra (Belgium) Chris van den Bergh	4
(Denmark) Brian Buur (Denmark) Per Laursen	1
(France) Cyril Brosse (France) Laurent Saillour	4
(Greece) John Michael (Greece) Paris Chloros	3
(Netherlands) Arjan Moen (Netherlands) Frans Harmsen	4
(Cyprus) Demetris Georgiou (Cyprus) Ermos Korradou	1
(Netherlands) Co Stompé (Netherlands) Raymond van Barneveld	4
(France) Gwen Cornec (France) Michel Boulet	1
(England) Kevin Painter (England) Martin Adams	4
(Norway) John Sandaker (Norway) Arne Sivertsen	0
(Italy) Sergio Pettarini (Italy) Sergei Vodicar	4
(Republic of Ireland) Sean McGowan (Republic of Ireland) Des Byrne	1
(Switzerland) Gaudenz Coray (Switzerland) Walter Tschudin	3
(Finland) Ulf Ceder (Finland) Kim Viljanen	4
(Austria) Franz Thaler (Austria) Arnold Anderwald	4
(Hungary) Nándor Bezzeg (Hungary) Roland Csermely	1
(Northern Ireland) Mitchell Crooks (Northern Ireland) Paul Watton	4
(Malta) Joe Caruana (Malta) Charles Ghiller	0
(Sweden) Peter Sjoberg (Sweden) Mikael Armbladh	4
(Greece) Panagiotis Zalonis (Greece) Christos Padazopoulos	2
(Scotland) Bob Taylor (Scotland) Gary Anderson	4
(Germany) Tomas Seyler (Germany) Colin Rice	3

3rd Round (best of 7 legs)
(Scotland) Mike Veitch (Scotland) Alan Brown	1
(Wales) Robert Hughes (Wales) Martin Phillips	4
(Malta) Emmanuel Ciantar (Malta) Godfrey Abela	2
(Austria) Axel Tschinkowitz (Austria) Mensur Suljović	4
(England) Ted Hankey (England) Mervyn King	4
(Belgium) Tanguy Borra (Belgium) Chris van den Bergh	2
(France) Cyril Brosse (France) Laurent Saillour	0
(Netherlands) Arjan Moen (Netherlands) Frans Harmsen	4
(Netherlands) Co Stompé (Netherlands) Raymond van Barneveld	4
(England) Kevin Painter (England) Martin Adams	0
(Italy) Sergio Pettarini (Italy) Sergei Vodicar	1
(Finland) Ulf Ceder (Finland) Kim Viljanen	4
(Austria) Franz Thaler (Austria) Arnold Anderwald	0
(Northern Ireland) Mitchell Crooks (Northern Ireland) Paul Watton	4
(Sweden) Peter Sjoberg (Sweden) Mikael Armbladh	1
(Scotland) Bob Taylor (Scotland) Gary Anderson	4

Quarter-finals (best of 7 legs)
(Wales) Robert Hughes (Wales) Martin Phillips	4
(Austria) Axel Tschinkowitz (Austria) Mensur Suljović	3
(England) Ted Hankey (England) Mervyn King	4
(Netherlands) Arjan Moen (Netherlands) Frans Harmsen	1
(Netherlands) Co Stompé (Netherlands) Raymond van Barneveld	4
(Finland) Ulf Ceder (Finland) Kim Viljanen	0
(Northern Ireland) Mitchell Crooks (Northern Ireland) Paul Watton	0
(Scotland) Bob Taylor (Scotland) Gary Anderson	4

Semi-finals (best of 7 legs)
(Wales) Robert Hughes (Wales) Martin Phillips	0
(England) Ted Hankey (England) Mervyn King	4
(Netherlands) Co Stompé (Netherlands) Raymond van Barneveld	4
(Scotland) Bob Taylor (Scotland) Gary Anderson	1

Final (best of 7 legs)
(England) Ted Hankey (England) Mervyn King	3
(Netherlands) Co Stompé (Netherlands) Raymond van Barneveld	4

== Men's team ==
Round Robin

Group A

Pos	Team	Pld	Win	Lose	LF	LA	+/-
1	Wales	2	2	0	18	6	+12
2	Germany	2	1	1	13	12	+1
3	Isle of Man	2	0	2	5	18	-13

- Wales 9 - 4 Germany
- Wales 9 - 2 Isle of Man
- Germany 9 - 3 Isle of Man

Group B

Pos	Team	Pld	Win	Lose	LF	LA	+/-
1	Norway	1	1	0	9	8	+1
2	Italy	1	0	1	8	9	-1

- Norway 9 - 8 Italy

Group C

Pos	Team	Pld	Win	Lose	LF	LA	+/-
1	Belgium	2	2	0	18	12	+6
2	Austria	2	1	1	13	14	-1
3	France	2	0	2	13	18	-5

- Belgium 9 - 4 Austria
- Belgium 9 - 8 France
- Austria 9 - 5 France

Group D

Pos	Team	Pld	Win	Lose	LF	LA	+/-
1	Netherlands	2	2	0	18	3	+15
2	Greece	2	1	1	11	13	-2
3	Cyprus	2	0	2	5	18	-13

- Netherlands 9 - 2 Greece
- Netherlands 9 - 1 Cyprus
- Greece 9 - 4 Cyprus

Group E

Pos	Team	Pld	Win	Lose	LF	LA	+/-
1	England	2	2	0	18	6	+12
2	(Hungary) Ireland	2	1	1	14	17	-3
3	(Austria) Switzerland	2	0	2	9	18	-9

- England 9 - 5 (Republic of Ireland) Ireland
- England 9 - 1 Switzerland
- (Republic of Ireland) Ireland 9 - 8 Switzerland

Group F

Pos	Team	Pld	Win	Lose	LF	LA	+/-
1	Denmark	1	1	0	9	3	+6
2	Malta	1	0	1	3	9	-6

- Denmark 9 - 3 Malta

Group G

Pos	Team	Pld	Win	Lose	LF	LA	+/-
1	Northern Ireland	1	1	0	9	6	+3
2	Hungary	1	0	1	6	9	-3

- Northern Ireland 9 - 6 Hungary

Group H

Pos	Team	Pld	Win	Lose	LF	LA	+/-
1	Finland	2	1	1	14	12	+2
2	Scotland	2	1	1	12	11	+1
3	Sweden	2	1	1	11	14	-3

- Finland 9 - 3 Scotland
- Scotland 9 - 2 Sweden
- Sweden 9 - 5 Finland

Knock Out

Last 16 (best of 17 legs)
A1	Wales	9
G2	Hungary	1
B1	(Sweden) Norway	5
H2	Scotland	9
C1	Belgium	9
E2	(Republic of Ireland) Ireland	4
D1	Netherlands	9
F2	Malta	5
E1	England	9
C2	Austria	2
F1	Denmark	9
D2	Cyprus	4
G1	Northern Ireland	9
A2	Germany	4
H1	Finland	9
B2	Italy	4

Quarter-finals (best of 17 legs)
A1	Wales	2
H2	Scotland	9
C1	Belgium	3
D1	Netherlands	9
E1	England	9
F1	Denmark	4
G1	Northern Ireland	8
H1	Finland	9

Semi-finals (best of 17 legs)
H2	Scotland	8
D1	Netherlands	9
E1	England	9
H1	Finland	8

Final (best of 17 legs)
D1	Netherlands	3
E1	England	9

== Woman's singles ==
1st Round (best of 7 legs)
(Finland) Satu Ikonen
Bye
(Hungary) Nora Kautzky
Bye
(England) Trina Gulliver
Bye
(Austria) Gerlinde Hristovski
Bye
(Denmark) Annette Hakonsen	4
(Republic of Ireland) Olive McIntyre	0
(France) Cathrine Robin
Bye
(Wales) Sandra Greatbatch
Bye
(Greece) Polita Varouxi
Bye
(Northern Ireland) Norma Irvine	3
(Italy) Mojca Humar	4
(Belgium) Vicky Pruim
Bye
(Netherlands) Karin Krappen
Bye
(Scotland) Jackie Sharpe
Bye
(Switzerland) Lisa Huber	3
(Isle of Man) Margaret Kelly	4
(Germany) Bianka Strauch
Bye
(Sweden) Kristina Korpii
Bye
(Norway) Tove Vestrum
Bye
(Sweden) Carina Ekberg
Bye
(Greece) Maria Poulidou
Bye
(Northern Ireland) Denise Cassidy
Bye
(Netherlands) Francis Hoenselaar
Bye
(Wales) Linda Rogers-Pickett	1
(France) Anita Chausson	4
(Republic of Ireland) Sandra O'Flaherty
Bye
(Norway) Karin Nordahl
Bye
(Italy) Sonia Moretti
Bye
(England) Apylee Jones	3
(Belgium) Sandra Pollet	4
(Austria) Monika Schartner
Bye
(Scotland) Anne Kirk
Bye
(Isle of Man) Linda Jordon
Bye
(Germany) Heike Ernst	4
(Hungary) Marene Racz	0
(Denmark) Ann-Louise Peters
Bye
(Finland) Tarja Salminen
Bye
(Switzerland) Sabine Beutler
Bye

2nd Round (best of 7 legs)
(Finland) Satu Ikonen	1
(Hungary) Nora Kautzky	4
(England) Trina Gulliver	4
(Austria) Gerlinde Hristovski	0
(Denmark) Annette Hakonsen	4
(France) Cathrine Robin	1
(Wales) Sandra Greatbatch	4
(Greece) Polita Varouxi	0
(Italy) Mojca Humar	4
(Belgium) Vicky Pruim	2
(Netherlands) Karin Krappen	4
(Scotland) Jackie Sharpe	0
(Isle of Man) Margaret Kelly	2
(Germany) Bianka Strauch	4
(Sweden) Kristina Korpii	4
(Norway) Tove Vestrum	1
(Sweden) Carina Ekberg	4
(Greece) Maria Poulidou	1
(Northern Ireland) Denise Cassidy	3
(Netherlands) Francis Hoenselaar	4
(France) Anita Chausson	4
(Republic of Ireland) Sandra O'Flaherty	3
(Norway) Karin Nordahl	4
(Italy) Sonia Moretti	0
(Belgium) Sandra Pollet	4
(Austria) Monika Schartner	0
(Scotland) Anne Kirk	4
(Isle of Man) Linda Jordon	0
(Germany) Heike Ernst	3
(Denmark) Ann-Louise Peters	4
(Finland) Tarja Salminen	4
(Switzerland) Sabine Beutler	0

3rd Round (best of 7 legs)
(Hungary) Nora Kautzky	0
(England) Trina Gulliver	4
(Denmark) Annette Hakonsen	1
(Wales) Sandra Greatbatch	4
(Italy) Mojca Humar	4
(Netherlands) Karin Krappen	2
(Germany) Bianka Strauch	1
(Sweden) Kristina Korpii	4
(Sweden) Carina Ekberg	0
(Netherlands) Francis Hoenselaar	4
(France) Anita Chausson	4
(Norway) Karin Nordahl	1
(Belgium) Sandra Pollet	4
(Scotland) Anne Kirk	3
(Denmark) Ann-Louise Peters	4
(Finland) Tarja Salminen	1

Quarter-finals (best of 7 legs)
(England) Trina Gulliver	4
(Wales) Sandra Greatbatch	2
(Italy) Mojca Humar	4
(Sweden) Kristina Korpii	2
(Netherlands) Francis Hoenselaar	4
(France) Anita Chausson	0
(Belgium) Sandra Pollet	2
(Denmark) Ann-Louise Peters	4

Semi-finals (best of 7 legs)
(England) Trina Gulliver	4
(Italy) Mojca Humar	0
(Netherlands) Francis Hoenselaar	0
(Denmark) Ann-Louise Peters	4

Final (best of 7 legs)
(England) Trina Gulliver	4
(Denmark) Ann-Louise Peters	0

== Woman's Pairs ==
Round Robin

Group A

Pos	Team	Pld	Win	Lose	LF	LA	+/-
1	(Republic of Ireland) Olive McIntyre (Republic of Ireland) Sandra O'Flaherty	4	4	0	16	9	+7
2	(England) Apylee Jones (England) Trina Gulliver	4	3	1	15	5	+10
3	(Denmark) Ann-Louise Peters (Denmark) Annette Hakonsen	4	2	2	11	10	+1
4	(Greece) Maria Poulidou (Greece) Polita Varouxi	4	1	3	7	12	-5
5	(Isle of Man) Linda Jordon (Isle of Man) Margaret Kelly	4	0	4	3	16	-3

- (Republic of Ireland) Olive McIntyre & Sandra O'Flaherty 4 - 3 (England) Apylee Jones & Trina Gulliver
- (Republic of Ireland) Olive McIntyre & Sandra O'Flaherty 4 - 3 (Denmark) Ann-Louise Peters & Annette Hakonsen
- (Republic of Ireland) Olive McIntyre & Sandra O'Flaherty 4 - 0 (Greece) Maria Poulidou & Polita Varouxi
- (Republic of Ireland) Olive McIntyre & Sandra O'Flaherty 4 - 3 (Isle of Man) Linda Jordon & Margaret Kelly
- (England) Apylee Jones & Trina Gulliver 4 - 0 (Denmark) Ann-Louise Peters & Annette Hakonsen
- (England) Apylee Jones & Trina Gulliver 4 - 1 (Greece) Maria Poulidou & Polita Varouxi
- (England) Apylee Jones & Trina Gulliver 4 - 0 (Isle of Man) Linda Jordon & Margaret Kelly
- (Denmark) Ann-Louise Peters & Annette Hakonsen 4 - 2 (Greece) Maria Poulidou & Polita Varouxi
- (Denmark) Ann-Louise Peters & Annette Hakonsen 4 - 0 (Isle of Man) Linda Jordon & Margaret Kelly
- (Greece) Maria Poulidou & Polita Varouxi 4 - 0 (Isle of Man) Linda Jordon & Margaret Kelly

Group B

Pos	Team	Pld	Win	Lose	LF	LA	+/-
1	(Wales) Linda Rogers-Pickett (Wales) Sandra Greatbatch	3	2	1	9	6	+3
2	(Netherlands) Karin Krappen (Netherlands) Francis Hoenselaar	3	2	1	10	8	+2
3	(Belgium) Vicky Pruim (Belgium) Sandra Pollet	3	1	2	8	8	0
4	(Sweden) Carina Ekberg (Sweden) Kristina Korpii	3	1	2	5	10	-5

- (Wales) Linda Rogers-Pickett & Sandra Greatbatch 4 - 1 (Belgium) Vicky Pruim & Sandra Pollet
- (Wales) Linda Rogers-Pickett & Sandra Greatbatch 4 - 1 (Sweden) Carina Ekberg & Kristina Korpii
- (Netherlands) Karin Krappen & Francis Hoenselaar 4 - 1 (Wales) Linda Rogers-Pickett & Sandra Greatbatch
- (Netherlands) Karin Krappen & Francis Hoenselaar 4 - 3 (Belgium) Vicky Pruim & Sandra Pollet
- (Belgium) Vicky Pruim & Sandra Pollet 4 - 0 (Sweden) Carina Ekberg & Kristina Korpii
- (Sweden) Carina Ekberg & Kristina Korpii 4 - 2 (Netherlands) Karin Krappen & Francis Hoenselaar

Group C

Pos	Team	Pld	Win	Lose	LF	LA	+/-
1	(Northern Ireland) Denise Cassidy (Northern Ireland) Norma Irvine	4	3	1	14	8	+6
2	(Norway) Tove Vestrum (Norway) Karin Nordahl	4	3	1	14	9	+5
3	(Germany) Bianka Strauch (Germany) Heike Ernst	4	3	1	14	10	+4
4	(Italy) Mojca Humar (Italy) Sonia Moretti	4	1	3	9	14	-5
5	(Austria) Gerlinde Hristovski (Austria) Monika Schartner	4	0	4	4	16	-12

- (Northern Ireland) Denise Cassidy & Norma Irvine 4 - 2 (Norway) Tove Vestrum & Karin Nordahl
- (Northern Ireland) Denise Cassidy & Norma Irvine 4 - 0 (Italy) Mojca Humar & Sonia Moretti
- (Northern Ireland) Denise Cassidy & Norma Irvine 4 - 0 (Austria) Gerlinde Hristovski & Monika Schartner
- (Norway) Tove Vestrum & Karin Nordahl 4 - 2 (Germany) Bianka Strauch & Heike Ernst
- (Norway) Tove Vestrum & Karin Nordahl 4 - 2 (Italy) Mojca Humar & Sonia Moretti
- (Norway) Tove Vestrum & Karin Nordahl 4 - 1 (Austria) Gerlinde Hristovski & Monika Schartner
- (Germany) Bianka Strauch & Heike Ernst 4 - 2 (Northern Ireland) Denise Cassidy & Norma Irvine
- (Germany) Bianka Strauch & Heike Ernst 4 - 3 (Italy) Mojca Humar & Sonia Moretti
- (Germany) Bianka Strauch & Heike Ernst 4 - 1 (Austria) Gerlinde Hristovski & Monika Schartner
- (Italy) Mojca Humar & Sonia Moretti 4 - 2 (Austria) Gerlinde Hristovski & Monika Schartner

Group D

Pos	Team	Pld	Win	Lose	LF	LA	+/-
1	(Scotland) Anne Kirk (Scotland) Jackie Sharpe	4	3	1	15	6	+9
2	(Finland) Satu Ikonen (Finland) Tarja Salminen	4	3	1	12	9	+3
3	(Hungary) Nora Kautzky (Hungary) Marene Racz	4	2	2	12	11	+1
4	(Switzerland) Sabine Beutler (Switzerland) Lisa Huber	4	1	3	9	15	-6
5	(France) Anita Chausson (France) Cathrine Robin	4	1	3	8	15	-7

- (Scotland) Anne Kirk & Jackie Sharpe 4 - 1 (Hungary) Nora Kautzky & Marene Racz
- (Scotland) Anne Kirk & Jackie Sharpe 4 - 0 (Switzerland) Sabine Beutler & Lisa Huber
- (Scotland) Anne Kirk & Jackie Sharpe 4 - 1 (France) Anita Chausson & Cathrine Robin
- (Finland) Satu Ikonen & Tarja Salminen 4 - 3 (Scotland) Anne Kirk & Jackie Sharpe
- (Finland) Satu Ikonen & Tarja Salminen 4 - 2 (Switzerland) Sabine Beutler & Lisa Huber
- (Finland) Satu Ikonen & Tarja Salminen 4 - 0 (France) Anita Chausson & Cathrine Robin
- (Hungary) Nora Kautzky & Marene Racz 4 - 0 (Finland) Satu Ikonen & Tarja Salminen
- (Hungary) Nora Kautzky & Marene Racz 4 - 3 (France) Anita Chausson & Cathrine Robin
- (Switzerland) Sabine Beutler & Lisa Huber 4 - 3 (Hungary) Nora Kautzky & Marene Racz
- (France) Anita Chausson & Cathrine Robin 4 - 3 (Switzerland) Sabine Beutler & Lisa Huber

Knock Out

Last 16 (best of 7 legs)
A1	(Republic of Ireland) Olive McIntyre (Republic of Ireland) Sandra O'Flaherty	4
D4	(Switzerland) Sabine Beutler (Switzerland) Lisa Huber	2
C2	(Norway) Tove Vestrum (Norway) Karin Nordahl	2
B3	(Belgium) Vicky Pruim (Belgium) Sandra Pollet	4
D1	(Scotland) Anne Kirk (Scotland) Jackie Sharpe	4
A3	(Denmark) Ann-Louise Peters (Denmark) Annette Hakonsen	3
C4	(Italy) Mojca Humar (Italy) Sonia Moretti	1
B2	(Netherlands) Karin Krappen (Netherlands) Francis Hoenselaar	4
C1	(Northern Ireland) Denise Cassidy (Northern Ireland) Norma Irvine	2
B4	(Sweden) Carina Ekberg (Sweden) Kristina Korpii	4
D3	(Hungary) Nora Kautzky (Hungary) Marene Racz	0
A2	(England) Apylee Jones (England) Trina Gulliver	4
B1	(Wales) Linda Rogers-Pickett (Wales) Sandra Greatbatch	1
C3	(Germany) Bianka Strauch (Germany) Heike Ernst	4
A4	(Greece) Maria Poulidou (Greece) Polita Varouxi	2
D2	(Finland) Satu Ikonen (Finland) Tarja Salminen	4

Quarter-finals (best of 7 legs)
A1	(Republic of Ireland) Olive McIntyre (Republic of Ireland) Sandra O'Flaherty	1
B3	(Belgium) Vicky Pruim (Belgium) Sandra Pollet	4
D1	(Scotland) Anne Kirk (Scotland) Jackie Sharpe	2
B2	(Netherlands) Karin Krappen (Netherlands) Francis Hoenselaar	4
B4	(Sweden) Carina Ekberg (Sweden) Kristina Korpii	2
A2	(England) Apylee Jones (England) Trina Gulliver	4
C3	(Germany) Bianka Strauch (Germany) Heike Ernst	4
D2	(Finland) Satu Ikonen (Finland) Tarja Salminen	3

Semi-finals (best of 7 legs)
B3	(Belgium) Vicky Pruim (Belgium) Sandra Pollet	1
B2	(Netherlands) Karin Krappen (Netherlands) Francis Hoenselaar	4
A2	(England) Apylee Jones (England) Trina Gulliver	4
C3	(Germany) Bianka Strauch (Germany) Heike Ernst	2

Final (best of 7 legs)
B2	(Netherlands) Karin Krappen (Netherlands) Francis Hoenselaar	4
A2	(England) Apylee Jones (England) Trina Gulliver	3
