= 2002 World Darts Trophy =

World Darts Trophy

Tournament information
- Dates: 7 September 2002 – 15 September 2002
- Venue: De Vechtsebanen
- Location: Utrecht, Utrecht
- Country: the Netherlands
- Organisation(s): BDO / WDF
- Format: Men; Sets; Final – Best of 11 Sets; Women; Sets; Final – Best of 5 Sets
- High checkout: 170 (England) Tony O'Shea

Champion(s)
- (Australia) Tony David (men) (Netherlands) Mieke de Boer (women)

The 2002 World Darts Trophy was the first edition of the World Darts Trophy, a professional darts tournament held at the De Vechtsebanen in Utrecht, the Netherlands, run by the British Darts Organisation and the World Darts Federation.

The final of the first men's event was between Tony David and Tony O'Shea, with Tony David beating Tony O'Shea in straight sets, 6–0. The BDO World Championship runner-up Mervyn King was eliminated in the second round also in straight sets by Tony David. In the final of the first women's event, Mieke de Boer defeated Crissy Howat, 3–1 in sets. Trina Gulliver, the BDO World Champion, was earlier beaten in the women's event by Anne Kirk in the quarter-finals.

== Seeds ==
Men

1. (England) John Walton
2. (England) Martin Adams
3. (England) Mervyn King
4. (Netherlands) Raymond van Barneveld
5. (Finland) Marko Pusa
6. (Finland) Jarkko Komula
7. (England) Andy Fordham
8. (Scotland) Bob Taylor

== Prize money ==
=== Men ===
Pos	Money (Euros)
Winner	45,000
Runner-up	22,500
Semi-Finals	11,250
Quarter-Finals	6,000
Last 16	3,000
Last 32	2,000

== Men's Tournament ==
First round Best of 5 sets
(England) Tony O'Shea	3
(England) Shaun Greatbatch	0
(England) Colin Monk	1
(England) John Walton	3
(Scotland) Mike Veitch	3
(Wales) Richie Davies	2
(Netherlands) Frans Harmsen	1
(Scotland) Bob Taylor	3
(England) Steve Coote	3
(Sweden) Stefan Nagy	0
(England) Bobby George	1
(England) Martin Adams	3
(England) Ted Hankey	3
(England) Wayne Mardle	2
(Netherlands) Jan van der Rassel	1
(England) Andy Fordham	3
(Netherlands) R van Barneveld	3
(Netherlands) Jean Paul van Acker	0
(Netherlands) Vincent van der Voort	0
(Denmark) Brian Buur	3
(Netherlands) Co Stompé	3
(Finland) Marko Pusa	2
(England) Matt Clark	0
(England) Wayne Jones	3
(Scotland) Peter Johnstone	3
(Finland) Jarkko Komula	1
(England) Andy Smith	0
(England) Tony Eccles	3
(England) Mervyn King	3
(Belgium) Johnn Snijers	2
(Belgium) Erik Clarys	0
(Australia) Tony David	3

Second round Best of 5 sets
(England) Tony O'Shea	3
(England) John Walton	2
(Scotland) Mike Veitch	1
(Scotland) Bob Taylor	3
(England) Steve Coote	3
(England) Martin Adams	2
(England) Ted Hankey	1
(England) Andy Fordham	3
(Netherlands) R van Barneveld	3
(Denmark) Brian Buur	2
(Netherlands) Co Stompé	1
(England) Wayne Jones	3
(Scotland) Peter Johnstone	3
(England) Tony Eccles	2
(England) Mervyn King	0
(Australia) Tony David	3

Quarter-Finals; Best of 9 sets
(England) Tony O'Shea	5
(Scotland) Bob Taylor	0
(England) Steve Coote	1
(England) Andy Fordham	5
(Netherlands) R van Barneveld	5
(England) Wayne Jones	0
(Scotland) Peter Johnstone	2
(Australia) Tony David	5

Semi-Finals; Best of 9 sets
(England) Tony O'Shea	5
(England) Andy Fordham	4
(Netherlands) R van Barneveld	4
(Australia) Tony David	5

Final; Best of 11 sets
(England) Tony O'Shea	0
(Australia) Tony David	6

== Women's Tournament ==
Quarter-Finals; Best of 3 sets		Semi-Finals; Best of 3 sets		Final; Best of 5 sets
(Belgium) Vicky Pruim	0
(England) Crissy Manley	2	(England) Crissy Manley	2
(England) Trina Gulliver	1	(Scotland) Anne Kirk	1
(Scotland) Anne Kirk	2			(England) Crissy Manley	1
(Netherlands) Francis Hoenselaar	2			(Netherlands) Mieke de Boer	3
(Sweden) Carina Ekberg	0	(Netherlands) Francis Hoenselaar	0
(Netherlands) Karin Krappen	1	(Netherlands) Mieke de Boer	2
(Netherlands) Mieke de Boer	2
