= 2002 WDF Europe Cup =

Tournament information
- Venue: Nekker Evenementenhal
- Location: Mechelen
- Country: Belgium
- Established: 17 Oct-19 Oct
- Organisation(s): WDF
- Format: Legs

Champion(s)
- Singles; Peter Johnstone (men's singles) (England) Claire Bywaters (women's singles); Pairs (England) Martin Adams & Mervyn King (men's pairs) (Netherlands) Francis Hoenselaar & Karin Krappen (women's pairs); Team; Scotland (men's team); Overall; Scotland (men's overall); Netherlands (women's overall)

The 2002 WDF Europe Cup was the 13th edition of the WDF Europe Cup darts tournament, organised by the World Darts Federation. It was held in Mechelen, Belgium from 17 Oct-19 Oct.

== Entered teams ==
20 countries/associations entered a men's selection in the event.

19 countries/associations entered a women's selection in the event.

| Nr. | Country | Men's Selection |
|---|---|---|
| 1 | Austria | Franz Thaler, August Jost, Mensur Suljović, Dietmar Burger |
| 2 | Belgium | Erik Clarys, Marco Taels, Arnold Paap, Chris van den Bergh |
| 3 | Denmark | Henrik Larsen-Primdal, Ole Jorgensen, Brian Buur, Soren Behrendsen |
| 4 | England | John Walton, Andy Fordham, Martin Adams, Mervyn King |
| 5 | Finland | Jarkko Komula, Ulf Ceder, Kim Viljanen, Marko Pusa |
| 6 | France | Gwen Cornec, Michael Leclercq, Laurent Saillour, Jean-Luc Leclercq |
| 7 | Germany | Colin Rice, Tomas Seyler, Rainer Haass, Jorg Neumann |
| 8 | Gibraltar | Dyson Parody, Dylan Duo, George Federico, Francis Taylor |
| 9 | Hungary | Norbert Meszes, Mark Vincze, Bela Balogh, Nándor Bezzeg |
| 10 | Ireland | Sean McGowan, Richard McMahon, Benny Grace, Gerard Foxe |
| 11 | Italy | Giuseppe Accorsi, Goran Protega, Loris Polese, Sergei Vodicar |
| 12 | Latvia | Maris Veidemanis, Arnis Veidemanis, Ronalds Mezals, Zanis Buklovskis |
| 13 | Netherlands | Albertino Essers, Vincent van der Voort, Raymond van Barneveld, Co Stompé |
| 14 | Northern Ireland | John Elder, Paul Watton, Paul McDonald, David Glenn |
| 15 | Norway | Jacques Langston, John Sandaker, Terje Deras, Helge Guddal |
| 16 | Russia | Igor Manturov, Yuri Salev, Andrei Ratnikov, Alexey Zhuravlev |
| 17 | Scotland | Peter Johnstone, Gary Anderson, George Dalglish, Mike Veitch |
| 18 | Sweden | Stefan Nagy, Göran Klemme, Markus Korhonen, Jonas Olovsson |
| 19 | Switzerland | Peter Schonauer, Urs Von Rufs, Chris Stephani, Walter Tschudin |
| 20 | Wales | Robert Hughes, Martin Phillips, Peter Johns, Richard Herbert |

| Nr. | Country | Woman's Selection |
|---|---|---|
| 1 | Austria | Gerlinde Hristovski & Monika Schartner |
| 2 | Belgium | Carine Dessein & Tanja Deprez |
| 3 | Denmark | Mona Lund & Annette Hakonsen |
| 4 | England | Trina Gulliver & Clare Bywaters |
| 5 | Finland | Jaan Laitinen & Marika Juhola |
| 6 | France | Valere Gaudion & Anita Chausson |
| 7 | Germany | Bianka Strauch & Heike Ernst |
| 8 | Hungary | Nora Kautzky & Nora Fekete |
| 9 | Ireland | Debbie Doyle & Olive McIntyre |
| 10 | Italy | Mojca Humar & Michela Zangheri |
| 11 | Latvia | Inese Grencione & Inita Bite |
| 12 | Netherlands | Karin Krappen & Francis Hoenselaar |
| 13 | Northern Ireland | Denise Cassidy & Norma Irvine |
| 14 | Norway | Britt-Randi Sandåker & Mette Engen-Hansen |
| 15 | Russia | Olga Meyer & Anastasia Dobromyslova |
| 16 | Scotland | Anne Kirk & Janette Higgins |
| 17 | Sweden | Maud Jansson & Carina Ekberg |
| 18 | Switzerland | Sabine Beutler & Lisa Huber |
| 19 | Wales | Jan Robbins & Julie Gore |

== Men's singles ==
1st Round (best of 7 legs)
(Netherlands) Raymond van Barneveld | 4
(Gibraltar) Dyson Parody | 2
(France) Gwen Cornec
Bye
(Wales) Martin Phillips
Bye
(Switzerland) Chris Stephani | 0
(Germany) Rainer Haas | 4
(England) Martin Adams
Bye
(Latvia) Ronalds Mezals | 0
(Sweden) Markus Korhonen | 4
(Northern Ireland) John Elder
Bye
(Republic of Ireland) Gerard Foxe
Bye
(Austria) August Jost
Bye
(Hungary) Mark Vincze
Bye
(Russia) Alexey Zhuravlev
Bye
(Norway) Jacques Langston
Bye
(Italy) Goran Protega
Bye
(Belgium) Arnold Paap
Bye
(Scotland) George Dalgleish | 2
(Denmark) Søren Behrendsen | 4
(Finland) Kim Viljanen | 4
(Gibraltar) George Federico | 0
(Sweden) Stefan Nagy
Bye
(Latvia) Arnis Veidemanis
Bye
(Republic of Ireland) Brendan Grace | 4
(Austria) Franz Thaler | 3
(Denmark) Ole Jorgensen
Bye
(Northern Ireland) Paul Watton
Bye
(Hungary) Bela Balogh
Bye
(Wales) Peter Johns | 4
(Gibraltar) Dylan Duo | 0
(France) Michael Leclercq
Bye
(England) Mervyn King | 4
(Gibraltar) Francis Taylor | 1
(Germany) Jorg Neumann
Bye
(Russia) Andrei Ratnikov
Bye
(Netherlands) Co Stompé
Bye
(Norway) Helge Guddal | 1
(Switzerland) Urs Von Rufs | 4
(Scotland) Gary Anderson
Bye
(Belgium) Erik Clarys | 4
(Italy) Giuseppe Accorsi | 2
(Finland) Ulf Ceder
Bye
(England) Andy Fordham
Bye
(Norway) John Sandaker | 4
(Republic of Ireland) David Glenn | 1
(Italy) Sergei Vodicar
Bye
(Scotland) Mike Veitch
Bye
(Hungary) Nándor Bezzeg | 3
(Germany) Tomas Seyler | 4
(Netherlands) Albertino Essers
Bye
(Belgium) Chris van den Bergh
(France) Laurent Saillour
Bye
(Republic of Ireland) Sean McGowan
Bye
(Finland) Marko Pusa | 0
(Russia) Yuri Salev | 4
(Austria) Dietmar Burger
Bye
(Switzerland) Walter Tschudin
Bye
(Latvia) Maris Veidemanis
Bye
(Denmark) Brian Buur
Bye
(Sweden) Jonas Olovsson
Bye
(Wales) Robert Hughes
Bye
(Germany) Colin Rice
Bye
(Denmark) Henrik Larsen-Primdal
Bye
(Russia) Igor Manturov
Bye
(England) John Walton | 4
(Republic of Ireland) Richard McMahon | 2
(Sweden) Göran Klemme
Bye
(Finland) Jarkko Komula
Bye
(Netherlands) Vincent van der Voort
Bye
(Austria) Mensur Suljović
Bye
(Italy) Loris Polese
Bye
(Switzerland) Peter Schonauer
Bye
(Northern Ireland) Paul McDonald
Bye
(Norway) Terje Deras
Bye
(France) Jean-Luc Leclercq | 4
(Latvia) Zanis Buklovskis | 0
(Wales) Richard Herbert
Bye
(Hungary) Norbert Meszes | 3
(Belgium) Marco Taels | 4
(Scotland) Peter Johnstone
Bye

2nd Round (best of 7 legs)
(Netherlands) Raymond van Barneveld | 4
(France) Gwen Cornec | 0
(Wales) Martin Phillips | 4
(Germany) Rainer Haas | 3
(England) Martin Adams | 4
(Sweden) Markus Korhonen | 3
(Northern Ireland) John Elder | 4
(Republic of Ireland) Gerard Foxe | 3
(Austria) August Jost | 4
(Hungary) Mark Vincze | 0
(Russia) Alexey Zhuravlev | 4
(Norway) Jacques Langston | 1
(Italy) Goran Protega | 4
(Belgium) Arnold Paap | 2
(Denmark) Søren Behrendsen | 2
(Finland) Kim Viljanen | 4
(Sweden) Stefan Nagy | 4
(Latvia) Arnis Veidemanis | 1
(Republic of Ireland) Brendan Grace | 4
(Denmark) Ole Jorgensen | 1
(Northern Ireland) Paul Watton | 4
(Hungary) Bela Balogh | 1
(Wales) Peter Johns | 4
(France) Michael Leclercq | 1
(England) Mervyn King | 4
(Germany) Jorg Neumann | 1
(Russia) Andrei Ratnikov | 0
(Netherlands) Co Stompé | 4
(Switzerland) Urs Von Rufs | 1
(Scotland) Gary Anderson | 4
(Belgium) Erik Clarys | 4
(Finland) Ulf Ceder | 2
(England) Andy Fordham | 4
(Norway) John Sandaker | 1
(Italy) Sergei Vodicar | 3
(Scotland) Mike Veitch | 4
(Germany) Tomas Seyler | 1
(Netherlands) Albertino Essers | 4
(Belgium) Chris van den Bergh | 4
(France) Laurent Saillour | 2
(Republic of Ireland) Sean McGowan | 3
(Russia) Yuri Salev | 4
(Austria) Dietmar Burger | 4
(Switzerland) Walter Tschudin | 2
(Latvia) Maris Veidemanis | 1
(Denmark) Brian Buur | 4
(Sweden) Jonas Olovsson | 4
(Wales) Robert Hughes | 1
(Germany) Colin Rice | 4
(Denmark) Henrik Larsen-Primdal | 2
(Russia) Igor Manturov | 0
(England) John Walton | 4
(Sweden) Göran Klemme | 4
(Finland) Jarkko Komula | 2
(Netherlands) Vincent van der Voort | 2
(Austria) Mensur Suljović | 4
(Italy) Loris Polese | 0
(Switzerland) Peter Schonauer | 4
(Northern Ireland) Paul McDonald | 4
(Norway) Terje Deras | 3
(France) Jean-Luc Leclercq | 4
(Wales) Richard Herbert | 2
(Belgium) Marco Taels | 1
(Scotland) Peter Johnstone | 4

3rd Round (best of 7 legs)
(Netherlands) Raymond van Barneveld | 4
(Wales) Martin Phillips | 3
(England) Martin Adams | 4
(Northern Ireland) John Elder | 1
(Austria) August Jost | 4
(Russia) Alexey Zhuravlev | 0
(Italy) Goran Protega | 1
(Finland) Kim Viljanen | 4
(Sweden) Stefan Nagy | 3
(Republic of Ireland) Brendan Grace | 4
(Northern Ireland) Paul Watton | 3
(Wales) Peter Johns | 4
(England) Mervyn King | 4
(Netherlands) Co Stompé | 3
(Scotland) Gary Anderson | 4
(Belgium) Erik Clarys | 1
(England) Andy Fordham | 4
(Scotland) Mike Veitch | 2
(Netherlands) Albertino Essers | 2
(Belgium) Chris van den Bergh | 4
(Russia) Yuri Salev | 3
(Austria) Dietmar Burger | 4
(Denmark) Brian Buur | 4
(Sweden) Jonas Olovsson | 2
(Germany) Colin Rice | 0
(England) John Walton | 4
(Sweden) Göran Klemme | 1
(Austria) Mensur Suljović | 4
(Switzerland) Peter Schonauer | 4
(Northern Ireland) Paul McDonald | 0
(France) Jean-Luc Leclercq | 0
(Scotland) Peter Johnstone | 4

4th Round (best of 7 legs)
(Netherlands) Raymond van Barneveld | 3
(England) Martin Adams | 4
(Austria) August Jost | 4
(Finland) Kim Viljanen | 0
(Republic of Ireland) Brendan Grace | 1
(Wales) Peter Johns | 4
(England) Mervyn King | 4
(Scotland) Gary Anderson | 2
(England) Andy Fordham | 4
(Belgium) Chris van den Bergh | 1
(Austria) Dietmar Burger | 4
(Denmark) Brian Buur | 2
(England) John Walton | 4
(Austria) Mensur Suljović | 0
(Switzerland) Peter Schonauer | 0
(Scotland) Peter Johnstone | 4

Quarter-finals (best of 7 legs)
(England) Martin Adams | 4
(Austria) August Jost | 0
(Wales) Peter Johns | 3
(England) Mervyn King | 4
(England) Andy Fordham | 2
(Austria) Dietmar Burger | 4
(England) John Walton | 1
(Scotland) Peter Johnstone | 4

Semi-finals (best of 7 legs)
(England) Martin Adams | 3
(England) Mervyn King | 4
Final (best of 7 legs)
(England) Mervyn King | 1
(Scotland) Peter Johnstone | 4
(Austria) Dietmar Burger | 0
(Scotland) Peter Johnstone | 4

== Men's Pairs ==
1st Round (best of 7 legs)
(France) Michael Leclercq (France) Jean-Luc Leclercq
Bye
(Wales) Robert Hughes (Wales) Martin Phillips
Bye
(Norway) Terje Deras (Norway) Jacques Langston
Bye
(England) Mervyn King (England) Martin Adams | 4
(Gibraltar) Dyson Parody (Gibraltar) Dylan Duo | 3
(Latvia) Maris Veidemanis (Latvia) Arnis Veidemanis | 1
(Hungary) Nándor Bezzeg (Hungary) Bela Balogh | 4
(Austria) Franz Thaler (Austria) Mensur Suljović
Bye
(Belgium) Erik Clarys (Belgium) Chris van den Bergh | 4
(Gibraltar) George Federico (Gibraltar) Francis Taylor | 0
(Switzerland) Peter Schonauer (Switzerland) Chris Stephani
Bye
(Netherlands) Co Stompé (Netherlands) Raymond van Barneveld
Bye
(Republic of Ireland) Richard McMahon (Republic of Ireland) Gerard Foxe | 3
(Sweden) Jonas Olovsson (Sweden) Göran Klemme | 4
(Northern Ireland) Paul McDonald (Northern Ireland) Paul Watton
Bye
(Finland) Ulf Ceder (Finland) Kim Viljanen
Bye
(Russia) Andrei Ratnikov (Russia) Igor Manturov
Bye
(Germany) Tomas Seyler (Germany) Colin Rice
Bye
(Denmark) Brian Buur (Denmark) Henrik Larsen-Primdal | 4
(Italy) Sergei Vodicar (Italy) Goran Protega | 2
(Scotland) Mike Veitch (Scotland) George Dalgleish
Bye
(Scotland) Gary Anderson (Scotland) Peter Johnstone
Bye
(Hungary) Norbert Meszes (Hungary) Mark Vincze
Bye
(Netherlands) Albertino Essers (Netherlands) Vincent van der Voort
Bye
(Northern Ireland) David Glenn (Northern Ireland) John Elder | 4
(Austria) Dietmar Burger (Austria) August Jost | 2
(Italy) Giuseppe Accorsi (Italy) Loris Polese
Bye
(Republic of Ireland) Brendan Grace (Republic of Ireland) Sean McGowan
Bye
(Germany) Jorg Neumann (Germany) Rainer Haas | 4
(Belgium) Marco Taels (Belgium) Arnold Paap | 2
(Denmark) Ole Jorgensen (Denmark) Soren Behrendsen
Bye
(England) John Walton (England) Andy Fordham
Bye
(Russia) Yuri Salev (Russia) Alexey Zhuravlev | 2
(France) Laurent Saillour (France) Gwen Cornec | 4
(Finland) Marko Pusa (Finland) Jarkko Komula
Bye
(Latvia) Ronalds Mezals (Latvia) Zanis Buklovskis
Bye
(Sweden) Stefan Nagy (Sweden) Markus Korhonen
Bye
(Switzerland) Walter Tschudin (Switzerland) Urs Von Rufs
Bye
(Norway) Helge Guddal (Norway) John Sandaker
Bye
(Wales) Richard Herbert (Wales) Peter Johns
Bye

2nd Round (best of 7 legs)
(France) Michael Leclercq (France) Jean-Luc Leclercq | 1
(Wales) Robert Hughes (Wales) Martin Phillips | 4
(Norway) Terje Deras (Norway) Jacques Langston | 0
(England) Mervyn King (England) Martin Adams | 4
(Hungary) Nándor Bezzeg (Hungary) Bela Balogh | 1
(Austria) Franz Thaler (Austria) Mensur Suljović | 4
(Belgium) Erik Clarys (Belgium) Chris van den Bergh | 4
(Switzerland) Peter Schonauer (Switzerland) Chris Stephani | 2
(Netherlands) Co Stompé (Netherlands) Raymond van Barneveld | 4
(Sweden) Jonas Olovsson (Sweden) Göran Klemme | 1
(Northern Ireland) Paul McDonald (Northern Ireland) Paul Watton | 2
(Finland) Ulf Ceder (Finland) Kim Viljanen | 4
(Russia) Andrei Ratnikov (Russia) Igor Manturov | 4
(Germany) Tomas Seyler (Germany) Colin Rice | 2
(Denmark) Brian Buur (Denmark) Henrik Larsen-Primdal | 4
(Scotland) Mike Veitch (Scotland) George Dalgleish | 0
(Scotland) Gary Anderson (Scotland) Peter Johnstone | 4
(Hungary) Norbert Meszes (Hungary) Mark Vincze | 0
(Netherlands) Albertino Essers (Netherlands) Vincent van der Voort | 4
(Northern Ireland) David Glenn (Northern Ireland) John Elder | 2
(Italy) Giuseppe Accorsi (Italy) Loris Polese | 4
(Republic of Ireland) Brendan Grace (Republic of Ireland) Sean McGowan | 2
(Germany) Jorg Neumann (Germany) Rainer Haas | 0
(Denmark) Ole Jorgensen (Denmark) Soren Behrendsen | 4
(England) John Walton (England) Andy Fordham | 4
(France) Laurent Saillour (France) Gwen Cornec | 0
(Finland) Marko Pusa (Finland) Jarkko Komula | 4
(Latvia) Ronalds Mezals (Latvia) Zanis Buklovskis | 2
(Sweden) Stefan Nagy (Sweden) Markus Korhonen | 2
(Switzerland) Walter Tschudin (Switzerland) Urs Von Rufs | 4
(Norway) Helge Guddal (Norway) John Sandaker | 4
(Wales) Richard Herbert (Wales) Peter Johns | 2

3rd Round (best of 7 legs)
(Wales) Robert Hughes (Wales) Martin Phillips | 1
(England) Mervyn King (England) Martin Adams | 4
(Austria) Franz Thaler (Austria) Mensur Suljović | 4
(Belgium) Erik Clarys (Belgium) Chris van den Bergh | 2
(Netherlands) Co Stompé (Netherlands) Raymond van Barneveld | 4
(Finland) Ulf Ceder (Finland) Kim Viljanen | 3
(Russia) Andrei Ratnikov (Russia) Igor Manturov | 0
(Denmark) Brian Buur (Denmark) Henrik Larsen-Primdal | 4
(Scotland) Gary Anderson (Scotland) Peter Johnstone | 4
(Netherlands) Albertino Essers (Netherlands) Vincent van der Voort | 3
(Italy) Giuseppe Accorsi (Italy) Loris Polese | 2
(Denmark) Ole Jorgensen (Denmark) Soren Behrendsen | 4
(England) John Walton (England) Andy Fordham | 2
(Finland) Marko Pusa (Finland) Jarkko Komula | 4
(Switzerland) Walter Tschudin (Switzerland) Urs Von Rufs | 4
(Norway) Helge Guddal (Norway) John Sandaker | 1

Quarter-finals (best of 7 legs)
(England) Mervyn King (England) Martin Adams | 4
(Austria) Franz Thaler (Austria) Mensur Suljović | 0
(Netherlands) Co Stompé (Netherlands) Raymond van Barneveld | 4
(Denmark) Brian Buur (Denmark) Henrik Larsen-Primdal | 1
(Scotland) Gary Anderson (Scotland) Peter Johnstone | 4
(Denmark) Ole Jorgensen (Denmark) Soren Behrendsen | 0
(Finland) Marko Pusa (Finland) Jarkko Komula | 2
(Switzerland) Walter Tschudin (Switzerland) Urs Von Rufs | 4

Semi-finals (best of 7 legs)
(England) Mervyn King (England) Martin Adams | 4
(Netherlands) Co Stompé (Netherlands) Raymond van Barneveld | 1
(Scotland) Gary Anderson (Scotland) Peter Johnstone | 4
(Switzerland) Walter Tschudin (Switzerland) Urs Von Rufs | 1

Final (best of 7 legs)
(England) Mervyn King (England) Martin Adams | 4
(Scotland) Gary Anderson (Scotland) Peter Johnstone | 0

== Men's team ==
Round Robin

Group A

| Pos | Team | Pld | Win | Lose | LF | LA | +/- |
|---|---|---|---|---|---|---|---|
| 1 | England | 3 | 3 | 0 | 27 | 10 | +17 |
| 2 | Sweden | 3 | 2 | 1 | 25 | 18 | +7 |
| 3 | Germany | 3 | 1 | 2 | 19 | 20 | -1 |
| 4 | France | 3 | 0 | 3 | 4 | 27 | -23 |

- England 9 - 7 Sweden
- England 9 - 3 Germany
- England 9 - 0 France
- Sweden 9 - 7 Germany
- Sweden 9 - 2 France
- Germany 9 - 2 France

Group B

| Pos | Team | Pld | Win | Lose | LF | LA | +/- |
|---|---|---|---|---|---|---|---|
| 1 | Scotland | 4 | 4 | 0 | 36 | 20 | +16 |
| 2 | Italy | 4 | 3 | 1 | 32 | 22 | +10 |
| 3 | Northern Ireland | 4 | 2 | 2 | 30 | 30 | 0 |
| 4 | Austria | 4 | 1 | 3 | 24 | 33 | -9 |
| 5 | Hungary | 4 | 0 | 4 | 19 | 36 | -17 |

- Scotland 9 - 5 Italy
- Scotland 9 - 7 Northern Ireland
- Scotland 9 - 3 Austria
- Scotland 9 - 5 Hungary
- Italy 9 - 5 Northern Ireland
- Italy 9 - 8 Austria
- Italy 9 - 0 Hungary
- Northern Ireland 9 - 4 Austria
- Northern Ireland 9 - 8 Hungary
- Austria 9 - 6 Hungary

Group C

| Pos | Team | Pld | Win | Lose | LF | LA | +/- |
|---|---|---|---|---|---|---|---|
| 1 | Netherlands | 4 | 4 | 0 | 36 | 8 | +28 |
| 2 | Denmark | 4 | 3 | 1 | 29 | 20 | +9 |
| 3 | (Republic of Ireland) Ireland | 4 | 2 | 2 | 29 | 25 | +4 |
| 4 | Switzerland | 4 | 1 | 3 | 20 | 32 | -12 |
| 5 | Latvia | 4 | 0 | 4 | 7 | 36 | -29 |

- Netherlands 9 - 2 Denmark
- Netherlands 9 - 3 (Republic of Ireland) Ireland
- Netherlands 9 - 2 Switzerland
- Netherlands 9 - 1 Latvia
- Denmark 9 - 8 (Republic of Ireland) Ireland
- Denmark 9 - 3 Switzerland
- Denmark 9 - 0 Latvia
- (Republic of Ireland) Ireland 9 - 6 Switzerland
- (Republic of Ireland) Ireland 9 - 1 Latvia
- Switzerland 9 - 5 Latvia

Group D

| Pos | Team | Pld | Win | Lose | LF | LA | +/- |
|---|---|---|---|---|---|---|---|
| 1 | Finland | 4 | 3 | 1 | 35 | 19 | +16 |
| 2 | Wales | 4 | 3 | 1 | 35 | 24 | +11 |
| 3 | Belgium | 4 | 3 | 1 | 33 | 27 | +6 |
| 4 | Norway | 4 | 1 | 3 | 17 | 30 | -13 |
| 5 | Russia | 4 | 0 | 4 | 16 | 36 | -20 |

- Finland 9 - 6 Belgium
- Finland 9 - 0 Norway
- Finland 9 - 4 Russia
- Wales 9 - 8 Finland
- Wales 9 - 4 Norway
- Wales 9 - 3 Russia
- Belgium 9 - 8 Wales
- Belgium 9 - 4 Norway
- Belgium 9 - 6 Russia
- Norway 9 - 3 Russia

Knock Out

Quarter-finals (best of 17 legs)
A1 | England | 8
D2 | Wales | 9
B1 | Scotland | 9
C2 | Denmark | 8
C1 | Netherlands | 9
B2 | Italy | 1
D1 | Finland | 9
A2 | Sweden | 6

Semi-finals (best of 17 legs)
D2 | Wales | 5
B1 | Scotland | 9
C1 | Netherlands | 9
D1 | Finland | 7

Final (best of 17 legs)
B1 | Scotland | 9
C1 | Netherlands | 8

== Woman's singles ==
1st Round (best of 7 legs)
(Denmark) Annette Hakonsen
Bye
(Austria) Monika Schartner
Bye
(Northern Ireland) Norma Irvine
Bye
(Netherlands) Karin Krappen
Bye
(Sweden) Maud Jansson | 2
(Switzerland) Lisa Huber | 4
(Finland) Marika Juhola
Bye
(Scotland) Janette Higgins
Bye
(Wales) Julie Gore | 4
(Hungary) Nora Fekete | 3
(England) Clare Bywaters
Bye
(Latvia) Inita Bite
Bye
(Russia) Olga Meyer
Bye
(Germany) Heike Ernst
Bye
(Norway) Britt-Randi Sandåker | 3
(Italy) Michela Zangheri | 4
(Republic of Ireland) Olive McIntyre
Bye
(France) Anita Chausson
Bye
(Belgium) Carine Dessein
Bye
(Hungary) Nora Kautzky
Bye
(Belgium) Tanja Deprez
Bye
(England) Trina Gulliver
Bye
(Russia) Anastasia Dobromyslova | 4
(Austria) Gerlinde Hristovski | 0
(Latvia) Inese Grencione
Bye
(Wales) Jan Robbins
Bye
(Italy) Mojca Humar
Bye
(Scotland) Anne Kirk | 4
(Finland) Jaan Laitinen | 2
(Netherlands) Francis Hoenselaar
Bye
(France) Valere Gaudion
Bye
(Sweden) Carina Ekberg
Bye
(Germany) Bianka Strauch | 2
(Northern Ireland) Denise Cassidy | 4
(Norway) Mette Engen-Hansen
Bye
(Switzerland) Sabine Beutler
Bye
(Republic of Ireland) Debbie Doyle
Bye
(Denmark) Mona Lund
Bye

2nd Round (best of 7 legs)
(Denmark) Annette Hakonsen | 4
(Austria) Monika Schartner | 1
(Northern Ireland) Norma Irvine | 1
(Netherlands) Karin Krappen | 4
(Switzerland) Lisa Huber | 1
(Finland) Marika Juhola | 4
(Scotland) Janette Higgins | 1
(Wales) Julie Gore | 4
(England) Clare Bywaters | 4
(Latvia) Inita Bite | 0
(Russia) Olga Meyer | 1
(Germany) Heike Ernst | 4
(Italy) Michela Zangheri | 1
(Republic of Ireland) Olive McIntyre | 4
(France) Anita Chausson | 1
(Belgium) Carine Dessein | 4
(Hungary) Nora Kautzky | 4
(Belgium) Tanja Deprez | 2
(England) Trina Gulliver | 2
(Russia) Anastasia Dobromyslova | 4
(Latvia) Inese Grencione | 0
(Wales) Jan Robbins | 4
(Italy) Mojca Humar | 3
(Scotland) Anne Kirk | 4
(Netherlands) Francis Hoenselaar | 4
(France) Valere Gaudion | 0
(Sweden) Carina Ekberg | 4
(Northern Ireland) Denise Cassidy | 2
(Norway) Mette Engen-Hansen | 1
(Switzerland) Sabine Beutler | 4
(Republic of Ireland) Debbie Doyle | 1
(Denmark) Mona Lund | 4

3rd Round (best of 7 legs)
(Denmark) Annette Hakonsen | 1
(Netherlands) Karin Krappen | 4
(Finland) Marika Juhola | 2
(Wales) Julie Gore | 4
(England) Clare Bywaters | 4
(Germany) Heike Ernst | 1
(Republic of Ireland) Olive McIntyre | 4
(Belgium) Carine Dessein | 3
(Hungary) Nora Kautzky | 2
(Russia) Anastasia Dobromyslova | 4
(Wales) Jan Robbins | 3
(Scotland) Anne Kirk | 4
(Netherlands) Francis Hoenselaar | 4
(Sweden) Carina Ekberg | 2
(Switzerland) Sabine Beutler | 4
(Denmark) Mona Lund | 0

Quarter-finals (best of 7 legs)
(Netherlands) Karin Krappen | 4
(Wales) Julie Gore | 3
(England) Clare Bywaters | 4
(Republic of Ireland) Olive McIntyre | 1
(Russia) Anastasia Dobromyslova | 4
(Scotland) Anne Kirk | 3
(Netherlands) Francis Hoenselaar | 4
(Switzerland) Sabine Beutler | 0

Semi-finals (best of 7 legs)
(Netherlands) Karin Krappen | 2
(England) Clare Bywaters | 4
(Russia) Anastasia Dobromyslova | 3
(Netherlands) Francis Hoenselaar | 4

Final (best of 7 legs)
(England) Clare Bywaters | 4
(Netherlands) Francis Hoenselaar | 2

== Woman's Pairs ==
Round Robin

Group A

| Pos | Team | Pld | Win | Lose | LF | LA | +/- |
|---|---|---|---|---|---|---|---|
| 1 | (Netherlands) Karin Krappen (Netherlands) Francis Hoenselaar | 3 | 2 | 1 | 10 | 6 | +4 |
| 2 | (Northern Ireland) Denise Cassidy (Northern Ireland) Norma Irvine | 3 | 2 | 1 | 9 | 7 | +2 |
| 3 | (Russia) Olga Meyer (Russia) Anastasia Dobromyslova | 3 | 2 | 1 | 10 | 8 | +2 |
| 4 | (Norway) Britt-Randi Sandåker (Norway) Mette Engen-Hansen | 3 | 0 | 3 | 4 | 12 | -8 |

- (Netherlands) Karin Krappen & Francis Hoenselaar 4 - 2 (Russia) Olga Meyer & Anastasia Dobromyslova
- (Netherlands) Karin Krappen & Francis Hoenselaar 4 - 0 (Norway) Britt-Randi Sandåker & Mette Engen-Hansen
- (Northern Ireland) Denise Cassidy & Norma Irvine 4 - 2 (Netherlands) Karin Krappen & Francis Hoenselaar
- (Northern Ireland) Denise Cassidy & Norma Irvine 4 - 1 (Norway) Britt-Randi Sandåker & Mette Engen-Hansen
- (Russia) Olga Meyer & Anastasia Dobromyslova 4 - 1 (Northern Ireland) Denise Cassidy & Norma Irvine
- (Russia) Olga Meyer & Anastasia Dobromyslova 4 - 3 (Norway) Britt-Randi Sandåker & Mette Engen-Hansen

Group B

| Pos | Team | Pld | Win | Lose | LF | LA | +/- |
|---|---|---|---|---|---|---|---|
| 1 | (Hungary) Nora Kautzky (Hungary) Nora Fekete | 4 | 4 | 0 | 16 | 7 | +9 |
| 2 | (Germany) Bianka Strauch (Germany) Heike Ernst | 4 | 3 | 1 | 14 | 6 | +8 |
| 3 | (Belgium) Carine Dessein (Belgium) Tanja Deprez | 4 | 2 | 2 | 10 | 9 | +1 |
| 4 | (Latvia) Inese Grencione (Latvia) Inita Bite | 4 | 1 | 3 | 7 | 14 | -7 |
| 5 | (Austria) Gerlinde Hristovski (Austria) Monika Schartner | 4 | 0 | 4 | 5 | 16 | -11 |

- (Hungary) Nora Kautzky & Nora Fekete 4 - 2 (Germany) Bianka Strauch & Heike Ernst
- (Hungary) Nora Kautzky & Nora Fekete 4 - 1 (Belgium) Carine Dessein & Tanja Deprez
- (Hungary) Nora Kautzky & Nora Fekete 4 - 2 (Latvia) Inese Grencione & Inita Bite
- (Hungary) Nora Kautzky & Nora Fekete 4 - 2 (Austria) Gerlinde Hristovski & Monika Schartner
- (Germany) Bianka Strauch & Heike Ernst 4 - 1 (Belgium) Carine Dessein & Tanja Deprez
- (Germany) Bianka Strauch & Heike Ernst 4 - 0 (Latvia) Inese Grencione & Inita Bite
- (Germany) Bianka Strauch & Heike Ernst 4 - 1 (Austria) Gerlinde Hristovski & Monika Schartner
- (Belgium) Carine Dessein & Tanja Deprez 4 - 1 (Latvia) Inese Grencione & Inita Bite
- (Belgium) Carine Dessein & Tanja Deprez 4 - 0 (Austria) Gerlinde Hristovski & Monika Schartner
- (Latvia) Inese Grencione & Inita Bite 4 - 2 (Austria) Gerlinde Hristovski & Monika Schartner

Group C

| Pos | Team | Pld | Win | Lose | LF | LA | +/- |
|---|---|---|---|---|---|---|---|
| 1 | (England) Trina Gulliver (England) Clare Bywaters | 4 | 4 | 0 | 16 | 5 | +11 |
| 2 | (Scotland) Anne Kirk (Scotland) Janette Higgins | 4 | 2 | 2 | 11 | 10 | +1 |
| 3 | (Wales) Jan Robbins (Wales) Julie Gore | 4 | 2 | 2 | 11 | 10 | +1 |
| 4 | (Italy) Mojca Humar (Italy) Michela Zangheri | 4 | 2 | 2 | 11 | 11 | 0 |
| 5 | (Finland) Jaan Laitinen (Finland) Marika Juhola | 4 | 0 | 4 | 3 | 16 | -3 |

- (England) Trina Gulliver & Clare Bywaters 4 - 2 (Scotland) Anne Kirk & Janette Higgins
- (England) Trina Gulliver & Clare Bywaters 4 - 1 (Wales) Jan Robbins & Julie Gore
- (England) Trina Gulliver & Clare Bywaters 4 - 2 (Italy) Mojca Humar & Michela Zangheri
- (England) Trina Gulliver & Clare Bywaters 4 - 0 (Finland) Jaan Laitinen & Marika Juhola
- (Scotland) Anne Kirk & Janette Higgins 4 - 1 (Italy) Mojca Humar & Michela Zangheri
- (Scotland) Anne Kirk & Janette Higgins 4 - 1 (Finland) Jaan Laitinen & Marika Juhola
- (Wales) Jan Robbins & Julie Gore 4 - 1 (Scotland) Anne Kirk & Janette Higgins
- (Wales) Jan Robbins & Julie Gore 4 - 1 (Finland) Jaan Laitinen & Marika Juhola
- (Italy) Mojca Humar & Michela Zangheri 4 - 2 (Wales) Jan Robbins & Julie Gore
- (Italy) Mojca Humar & Michela Zangheri 4 - 1 (Finland) Jaan Laitinen & Marika Juhola

Group D

| Pos | Team | Pld | Win | Lose | LF | LA | +/- |
|---|---|---|---|---|---|---|---|
| 1 | (Sweden) Maud Jansson (Sweden) Carina Ekberg | 4 | 4 | 0 | 16 | 8 | +8 |
| 2 | (Republic of Ireland) Debbie Doyle (Republic of Ireland) Olive McIntyre | 4 | 2 | 2 | 14 | 2 | +12 |
| 3 | (Denmark) Mona Lund (Denmark) Annette Hakonsen | 4 | 2 | 2 | 11 | 13 | -2 |
| 4 | (Switzerland) Sabine Beutler (Switzerland) Lisa Huber | 4 | 1 | 3 | 10 | 12 | -2 |
| 5 | (France) Valere Gaudion (France) Anita Chausson | 4 | 1 | 3 | 9 | 15 | -6 |

- (Sweden) Maud Jansson & Carina Ekberg 4 - 3 (Republic of Ireland) Debbie Doyle & Olive McIntyre
- (Sweden) Maud Jansson & Carina Ekberg 4 - 0 (Denmark) Mona Lund & Annette Hakonsen
- (Sweden) Maud Jansson & Carina Ekberg 4 - 3 (Switzerland) Sabine Beutler & Lisa Huber
- (Sweden) Maud Jansson & Carina Ekberg 4 - 2 (France) Valere Gaudion & Anita Chausson
- (Republic of Ireland) Debbie Doyle & Olive McIntyre 4 - 3 (Denmark) Mona Lund & Annette Hakonsen
- (Republic of Ireland) Debbie Doyle & Olive McIntyre 4 - 1 (Switzerland) Sabine Beutler & Lisa Huber
- (Denmark) Mona Lund & Annette Hakonsen 4 - 2 (Switzerland) Sabine Beutler & Lisa Huber
- (Denmark) Mona Lund & Annette Hakonsen 4 - 3 (France) Valere Gaudion & Anita Chausson
- (Switzerland) Sabine Beutler & Lisa Huber 4 - 0 (France) Valere Gaudion & Anita Chausson
- (France) Valere Gaudion & Anita Chausson 4 - 3 (Republic of Ireland) Debbie Doyle & Olive McIntyre

Knock Out

Quarter-finals (best of 7 legs)
A1 | (Netherlands) Karin Krappen (Netherlands) Francis Hoenselaar | 4
D2 | (Republic of Ireland) Debbie Doyle (Republic of Ireland) Olive McIntyre | 3
B1 | (Hungary) Nora Kautzky (Hungary) Nora Fekete | 1
C2 | (Wales) Jan Robbins (Wales) Julie Gore | 4
C1 | (England) Trina Gulliver (England) Clare Bywaters | 4
A2 | (Germany) Bianka Strauch (Germany) Heike Ernst | 1
D1 | (Sweden) Maud Jansson (Sweden) Carina Ekberg | 4
B2 | (Russia) Olga Meyer (Russia) Anastasia Dobromyslova | 3

Semi-finals (best of 7 legs)
A1 | (Netherlands) Karin Krappen (Netherlands) Francis Hoenselaar | 4
C2 | (Wales) Jan Robbins (Wales) Julie Gore | 0
C1 | (England) Trina Gulliver (England) Clare Bywaters | 2
D1 | (Sweden) Maud Jansson (Sweden) Carina Ekberg | 4

Final (best of 7 legs)
A1 | (Netherlands) Karin Krappen (Netherlands) Francis Hoenselaar | 4
D1 | (Sweden) Maud Jansson (Sweden) Carina Ekberg | 3
