= 2001 WDF World Cup =

The 2001 WDF World Cup was the 13th edition of the WDF World Cup darts tournament, organised by the World Darts Federation. It was held in Kuala Lumpur, Malaysia.

== Men's singles ==
Third round
(Wales)	Alan Reynolds	3
(Netherlands)	Co Stompé	4
(England)	Martin Adams	4
(Scotland)	Peter Johnstone	2
(Australia)	Russell Stewart	0
(Sweden)	Stefan Nagy	4
(Norway)	John Sandåker	4
(Philippines)	Celso III Parfan	1
(Sweden)	Magnus Caris	4
(South Africa)	Gawie Roesstorff	3
(Australia)	Anthony Fleet	2
(Netherlands)	Raymond van Barneveld	4
(England)	Mervyn King	4
(Wales)	Martin Phillips	3
(New Zealand)	Warren Parry	0
(Denmark)	Brian Sorensen	4
(England)	Andy Fordham	4
(New Zealand)	Herbie Nathan	1
(Wales)	Ritchie Davies	4
(Germany)	Tomas Seyler	1
(Finland)	Marko Pusa	4
(Norway)	Jacques Langston	3
(Northern Ireland)	John Elder	4
(Netherlands)	Marco Tak	2
(Australia)	Tony David	1
(England)	John Walton	4
(Denmark)	Bjarne Jensen	4
(Republic of Ireland)	Stephen McDonnell	0
(Finland)	Jarkko Komula	4
(Scotland)	Gary Anderson	2
(Sweden)	Peter Sjöberg	4
(New Zealand)	Alan Thomson	1

Fourth round
(Netherlands)	Co Stompé	0
(England)	Martin Adams	4
(Sweden)	Stefan Nagy	4
(Norway)	John Sandåker	2
(Sweden)	Magnus Caris	4
(Netherlands)	Raymond van Barneveld	3
(England)	Mervyn King	4
(Denmark)	Brian Sorensen	0
(England)	Andy Fordham	4
(Wales)	Ritchie Davies	3
(Finland)	Marko Pusa	4
(Northern Ireland)	John Elder	0
(England)	John Walton	4
(Denmark)	Bjarne Jensen	0
(Finland)	Jarkko Komula	4
(Sweden)	Peter Sjöberg	1

Quarter-finals
(England)	Martin Adams	4
(Sweden)	Stefan Nagy	1
(Sweden)	Magnus Caris	2
(England)	Mervyn King	4
(England)	Andy Fordham	4
(Finland)	Marko Pusa	0
(England)	John Walton	4
(Finland)	Jarkko Komula	1

Semi-finals
(England)	Martin Adams	4
(England)	Mervyn King	3
(England)	Andy Fordham	4
(England)	John Walton	2

Final
(England)	Martin Adams	4
(England)	Andy Fordham	3

== Women's singles ==
Quarter-finals
(Scotland)	Anne Kirk	4
(Denmark)	Ann Louise Peters	0
(Netherlands)	Francis Hoenselaar	4
(Australia)	Tracey James	0
(Netherlands)	Mieke de Boer	4
(South Africa)	Jill Field	1
(Australia)	Natalie Carter	4
(Philippines)	Janice Hinojales	1

Semi-finals
(Scotland)	Anne Kirk	2
(Netherlands)	Francis Hoenselaar	4
(Netherlands)	Mieke de Boer	4
(Australia)	Natalie Carter	1

Final
(Netherlands)	Francis Hoenselaar	4
(Netherlands)	Mieke de Boer	2

== Other Winners ==
Event	Winner	Score	Runner-up
Men's Team	(England) Martin Adams; Andy Fordham; Mervyn King; John Walton	9-7	(Finland) Marko Pusa; Marko Kantele; Jarkko Komula; Ulf Ceder
Men's Pairs	(England) John Walton; Andy Fordham	4-2	(Finland) Ulf Ceder; Marko Kantele
Women's Pairs	(Netherlands) Mieke de Boer; Francis Hoenselaar	4-2	(Sweden) Carina Ekberg; Kristiina Korpi
Youth Singles - Boys	(England) Stephen Bunting	3-1	(Sweden) Markus Korhonen
Youth Singles - Girls	(Australia) Venus Johnson	3-0	(South Africa) Melody Unger
Youth Pairs	(Sweden) Markus Korhonen; Johanna Ehn	3-0	(Germany) Michael Karkoska; Nicole Outhues

== Final Points Tables ==
=== Men ===
Ranking	Team	Points
1	England	202
2	Finland	110
3	Sweden	63
4	Netherlands	51
5	Denmark	37
5	Wales	37

=== Women ===
Ranking	Team	Points
1	Netherlands	66
2	Sweden	22
3	Australia	20
4	Japan	15
5	England	13

=== Youth ===
Ranking	Team	Points
1	Sweden	48
2	England	47
3	Australia	38
4	Germany	31
5	South Africa	29
