= 2011 Apatin Open darts =

Apatin Open

Tournament information
- Dates: 10 July 2011
- Country: Serbia
- Organisation(s): WDF
- Winner's share: €600

Champion(s)
- (Hungary) Nandor Bezzeg

2011 Apatin Open is a darts tournament, which took place in Apatin, Serbia in 2011.

== Results ==
Quarter-finals
(Hungary) | Nandor Bezzeg | 4
(Serbia) | Vladimir Pavkovic | 3
(Croatia) | Zoran Keser | 4
(Hungary) | Bela Balogh | 2
(Serbia) | Milan Stankovic | 4
(Serbia) | Zoran Cergic | 0
(Serbia) | Sandor Utasi | 4
(Slovenia) | Vastimir Gavrilovic | 2

Semi-finals
(Hungary) | Nandor Bezzeg | 5
(Croatia) | Zoran Keser | 2
(Serbia) | Milan Stankovic | 5
(Serbia) | Sandor Utasi | 1

Final
(Hungary) | Nandor Bezzeg | 6
(Serbia) | Milan Stankovic | 4
