= Maurizio Moretti =

Italian footballer (1945–2021)

Personal information
- Date of birth: 3 March 1945
- Date of death: 30 March 2021 (aged 76)
- Place of death: Friuli, Italy
- Position: Defender

Senior career*
Years	Team	Apps	(Gls)
1962–1968	SPAL		
1969–1971	SPAL		
- * Club domestic league appearances and goals

Maurizio Moretti (3 March 1945 – 30 March 2021) was an Italian professional footballer who played as a defender for SPAL.

Moretti died of complications from COVID-19 during the COVID-19 pandemic in Italy in March 2021.
