= Annette Hakonsen =

Danish darts player

Personal information
- Born: 17 October 1962 (age 64) Skive, Denmark

Sport
- Sport: Darts
- Laterality: Right-handed

Organisation (see split in darts)
- BDO: 1986–2007

Other tournament wins
- Tournament: Years
- Nordic Ch'ship Danish National Ch'ship: 1998 1990, 1991, 1997, 1998, 1999, 2000, 2007

Annette Hakonsen (born 17 October 1962) is a Danish former darts player.

Hakonsen was picked 20 times for the national team – which is a record for senior players. Between 1990 and 2007, she won a record high 22 Danish Championships, 7 of them in singles. In 1998, she became the first female Danish dart player to win the Nordic Championship in singles, beating Ann-Louise Peters.
