= Erik Clarys =

Belgian darts player

Personal information
- Nickname: The Sheriff
- Born: 18 October 1968 (age 58) Deurne, Belgium
- Home town: Antwerp, Belgium

Sport
- Sport: Darts
- Playing since: 1981
- Darts: 24 Gram Datadart Signature
- Laterality: Right-handed
- Walk-on music: "The Good, the Bad and the Ugly" by Ennio Morricone

Organisation (see split in darts)
- BDO: 1988–2004
- PDC: 2004–2006

WDF major events – best performances
- World Championship: Quarter-Final: 2003
- World Masters: Winner (1): 1995
- World Trophy: Last 32: 2002
- Int. Darts League: Last 32 Group: 2003
- Finder Masters: Last 16 Group: 2000

PDC premier events – best performances
- World Championship: Last 32: 2004, 2006
- UK Open: Quarter-Final: 2005
- Desert Classic: Last 16: 2005

Other tournament wins
- Years
Belgium National Championship	1997, 1998, 1999, 2003
Belgium Gold Cup	1998, 2002, 2004
Dortmund Open	1998, 1999, 2002
Swedish Open	1999
German Gold Cup	2006
- Updated on 9 June 2019

Erik Clarys (born 18 October 1968) is a Belgian former professional darts player who competed in events of the British Darts Organisation (BDO) and Professional Darts Corporation (PDC). Nicknamed "The Sheriff", he was known for his unorthodox way of scoring and finishing which made him popular with fans.

== BDO career ==
Clarys caused a major upset by winning the 1995 Winmau World Masters. Amongst his victims were future World and Masters champions Andy Fordham and Martin Adams before beating reigning Masters and World champion Richie Burnett in the final. Clarys continued to do well in tournaments, winning the Belgium National Championship four times, the Belgium Gold Cup three times, the Dortmund Open three times as well as the 1999 Swedish Open. Despite this however, he wasn't able to match these performances in other major tournaments. He played in six BDO World Championships, losing in the first round in his first four visits. He finally won a match at the Lakeside in the fifth time of asking in 2002, beating Andree Welge before losing in the second round to Raymond van Barneveld. In 2003, Clarys beat Tony Eccles and Robert Wagner en route to the quarter-finals, eventually losing again to Barneveld despite hitting a 170 checkout.

== PDC career ==
In 2004, Clarys switched to the PDC, after qualifying for their World Championship, beating Dan Lauby and Mark Walsh to reach the third round, losing to Ronnie Baxter. Though Clarys was unable to win any titles, he had good showings in major tournaments including a quarter final place in the 2005 UK Open. He made another appearance in the PDC World Championship, beating Winston Cadogan in round one before losing to Wayne Mardle. He then went on to win the WDF German Gold Cup.

== Injury and retirement ==
In June 2006, Clarys shattered his right elbow after falling from a ladder while at work, forcing him to withdraw from the 2006 UK Open. He was ranked 26th in the PDC world rankings at the time of his accident and was in the running for qualification for the World Matchplay. After eleven operations, Clarys gave up all hope of returning to darts as a right-handed player. He began practising throwing left-handed, stating he hoped to return to the game some day, but was unable to reach a competitive level and ultimately gave up returning to competitive darts. Since 2021, he has been working as a darts commentator for Belgian television.

== World Championship performances ==
=== BDO ===
- 1997: 1st round (lost to Paul Williams 2–3)
- 1998: 1st round (lost to Kevin Painter 1–3)
- 1999: 1st round (lost to Tony Littleton 2–3)
- 2001: 1st round (lost to Martin Adams 1–3)
- 2002: 2nd round (lost to Raymond van Barneveld 0–3)
- 2003: Quarter-finals (lost to Raymond van Barneveld 1–5)

=== PDC ===
- 2004: 3rd round (lost to Ronnie Baxter 2–4)
- 2006: 2nd round (lost to Wayne Mardle 1–4)

== Career finals ==
=== BDO major finals: 1 (1 title) ===
Outcome	No.	Year	Championship	Opponent in the final	Score	Ref.
Winner	1.	1995	Winmau World Masters	(Wales) Richie Burnett	3–0 (s)	
