= Nándor Bezzeg =

Hungarian darts player

Personal information
- Nickname: Mighty Magyar
- Born: 12 May 1971 (age 55) Szolnok, Hungary
- Home town: Jászladány

Sport
- Sport: Darts
- Playing since: 1991
- Darts: Unicorn Global Nandor Bezzeg 23g
- Laterality: Left-handed
- Walk-on music: "Start Me Up" by The Rolling Stones

Organisation (see split in darts)
- BDO: 2000–2008
- PDC: 2008–

PDC premier events – best performances
- World Championship: Last 64: 2009

Other tournament wins
- Years
| Apatin Open | 2010, 2011, 2016 |
| Austrian Open | 2008 |
| PDC East Europe Qualifier | 2008 |
| Romanian Open | 2010 |

Nándor Bezzeg (born 12 May 1971) is a Hungarian professional darts player.

== Career ==
Bezzeg reached the final of the 2007 Austrian Open, losing to Joey ten Berge. He then reached the final of the 2008 Hungarian Open, beating ten Berge in the semis before losing to another Dutchman Mareno Michels. Bezzeg won the 2008 Austrian Open, beating another Dutchman Davy Verkooijen in the final.

One month after his Austrian Open success, Bezzeg won the PDC World East European Qualifying Event, earning him a spot in the 2009 PDC World Darts Championship. He was the first ever Hungarian darts player in either version of the World Darts Championship. He lost to Vincent van der Voort in the first round with a 3–0 whitewash.

Bezzeg represented Hungary with Kristian Kaufmann in the 2012 PDC World Cup of Darts and together they were beaten 5–3 by Canada in the first round. In the following year's event he partnered Zsolt Mészáros, but they finished bottom of Group H after losing 5–0 to Belgium and 5–1 to Northern Ireland. Bezzeg and Mészáros also teamed up for the 2014 World Cup and lost 5–1 to the United States in the first round. In 2015 Bezzeg and Gabor Takacs earned Hungary's first ever World Cup win by beating Sweden 5–2. In the second round they lost both of their singles matches against Scotland's number two seeds Gary Anderson and Peter Wright.

Bezzeg was defeated in the final of the 2016 Kirchheim Open by Daniel Zygla. He won his third Apatin Open title courtesy of beating Kostas Pantelidis 6–3. Bezzeg and new partner Patrik Kovács progressed past Thailand 5–3 in round one of the World Cup, before they lost both their matches against Belgium in the second round.

== World Championship results ==
=== PDC ===
- 2009: First round (lost to Vincent van der Voort 0–3)
