= Bob Taylor (darts player) =

Scottish darts player (born 1960)

Personal information
- Nickname: "The Bear"
- Born: 15 January 1960 (age 66) Aberdeen, Scotland
- Home town: Alford, Aberdeenshire, Scotland

Sport
- Sport: Darts
- Darts: 22 Gram Datadart
- Laterality: Right-handed
- Walk-on music: "Back in Black" by AC/DC

Organisation (see split in darts)
- BDO: 1988–2007, 2013–2014

WDF major events – best performances
- World Championship: Quarter Final: 2002, 2003
- World Masters: Quarter Final: 2001
- World Trophy: Quarter Final: 2002
- Int. Darts League: Last 32 Group: 2003, 2004
- Finder Masters: Quarter Final: 2002

Other tournament wins
- Tournament: Years
- Norway Open Finnish Open Scottish Masters: 1993; 2001; 1994, 2000

Bob Taylor (born 15 January 1960) is a Scottish former professional darts player who played in the British Darts Organisation (BDO).

== Career ==
Taylor made eleven appearances in the BDO World Darts Championship, losing in the first round in seven of his first eight showings with his one win coming in 1994 against American Tony Payne before losing in the second round to Martin Adams. His bad luck changed in 2002 where he beat John Ferrell and Co Stompé to reach the Quarter Finals for the first time, losing to eventual winner Tony David. In 2003, Taylor again reached the Quarter Finals at the Lakeside, with wins over Peter Hunt and Martin Adams before losing to Gary Anderson. His final Lakeside appearance came in 2004, losing in the first round to Paul Hogan.

Taylor was also a quarter finalist at the 2001 Winmau World Masters, beating Liam Miley and Ernest Brown before losing to eventual finalist Jarkko Komula of Finland. He won the 1993 Norway Open and the 2001 Finnish Open.

== World Championship results ==
=== BDO ===
- 1991: 1st Round (lost to Mike Gregory 2–3)
- 1994: 2nd Round (lost to Martin Adams 1–3)
- 1995: 1st Round (lost to Paul Williams 0–3)
- 1996: 1st Round (lost to Ian Brand 0–3)
- 1997: 1st Round (lost to Les Wallace 1–3)
- 1998: 1st Round (lost to Roger Carter 1–3)
- 2000: 1st Round (lost to Ted Hankey 0–3)
- 2001: 1st Round (lost to Wayne Jones 0–3)
- 2002: Quarter Finals (lost to Tony David 4–5)
- 2003: Quarter Finals (lost to Gary Anderson 0–5)
- 2004: 1st Round (lost to Paul Hogan 0–3)
