= Mieke de Boer =

Dutch darts player (born 1980)

Personal information
- Nickname: Bambie
- Born: 11 January 1980 (age 46) Maastricht, Netherlands
- Home town: Maastricht

Sport
- Sport: Darts
- Darts: 24 gram Tungsten Davey davey
- Laterality: Right-handed
- Walk-on music: Tubthumping by Chumbawamba

Organisation (see split in darts)
- BDO: 2002–2005

WDF major events – best performances
- World Championship: Semi-final: 2003
- World Masters: Last 16: 2002
- World Trophy: Winner (1) 2002

Other tournament wins
- Tournament: Years
- Girls WDF Europe Youth Cup WDF World Cup Pairs British Open: 1994; 2001; 2002

Mieke de Boer (born 11 January 1980 in Maastricht, Limburg) is a former darts player from the Netherlands, who was nicknamed Bambie.

== Career ==
In 2002 she won the Women's World Darts Trophy, beating Karin Krappen in the quarter-finals and then Francis Hoenselaar in the semi-finals before beating Crissy Manley in the final. She also won the British Open Ladies Singles the same year. A year later, de Boer was the youngest competitor at the BDO World Darts Championship in Frimley Green and reached the semi-finals, beating Linda Rogers-Pickett in the quarter-finals before her run was ended by Ladies World Champion Trina Gulliver. She returned to the Lakeside a year later but lost in the quarter-finals to Hoenselaar. Her last major tournament was the 2005 World Darts Trophy, losing in the quarter-finals to Karin Krappen. Since then, de Boer has not been successful in qualifying for any of the major tournaments. When not playing, de Boer also works as an analyst for Dutch television.

== World Championship results ==
=== BDO ===
- 2003: Semi-finals (lost to Trina Gulliver 0–2)
- 2004: Quarter-finals (lost to Francis Hoenselaar 0–2)

Awards
Preceded by Lieja Tunks	Amsterdam Sportswoman of the Year; 2001	Succeeded by Marjolein de Jong
