= Ann-Louise Peters =

Danish darts player

Ann Louise Peters
Personal information
- Nickname: The Danish Diamond
- Born: 3 February 1975 (age 51) Esbjerg, Denmark

Sport
- Sport: Darts
- Laterality: Right-handed
- Walk-on music: The Best by Tina Turner

Organisation (see split in darts)
- BDO: 2000-2001, 2013-2016

WDF major events – best performances
- World Championship: Semi-final: 2014, 2016
- World Masters: Last 16: 2013
- World Trophy: Last 16: 2015, 2016
- Finder Masters: Last 6 Group: 2014

Other tournament wins
- Tournament: Years
- Swedish Open Norway Open Wiking Masters WDF Europe Cup Youth Austria Open National Ch'ship: 1999; 1993, 1996; 1995, 1996; 1990, 1991, 1992 2014; 1993, 1996, 2006, 2013, 2014

Other achievements
- 2000 WDF Europe Cup Runner-up

Ann Louise Peters (née Andersen; born 3 February 1975) is a Danish former darts player.

== Biography ==
Peters learnt to play darts at the Gåsen club in Assens.

She made her debut at the 1990 WDF Europe Youth Cup, where she won the singles three years in a row (1990, 1991, 1992); as well as the pairs in 1991 and 1992, and the team events in 1991 and 1992.

She later won the Norway Open in 1993, beating Deta Hedman, and again in 1996 against Sandra Pollet. Her last major win before she stopped, was the 1999 Swedish Open where she beat Satu Ikonen from Finland. Unfortunately, she dropped the glass sculpture trophy on the floor.

She has won the Danish Championships five times, in 1993, 1996, 2006, 2013 and 2014.

Peters has been picked 23 times for the Danish national team, which is a record for the ladies (20 as senior and 3 times as a youth player).

Peters made her comeback in 2013, and qualified for the 2014 BDO World Darts Championship. She beat Rachel Brooks 2–0 in the first round, and Julie Gore by the same scoreline in the quarter-finals before losing 2–0 to Deta Hedman in the semi-finals.

In October 2014 it was announced that she would receive the last wildcard for the Zuiderduin Masters

== World Professional Darts Championship ==
=== BDO ===
- 2014: Semi-finals (lost to Deta Hedman 2–0)
- 2016: Semi-finals (lost to Deta Hedman 2–0)
