= Mike Veitch =

Personal information
- Full name: Michael Veitch
- Nickname: "The Cat"
- Born: 15 August 1960 (age 66) Edinburgh, Scotland
- Home town: Bonnyrigg, Scotland

Sport
- Sport: Darts
- Playing since: 1990
- Darts: 22g Red Dragon
- Laterality: Right-handed
- Walk-on music: "Ready to Go" by Republica

Organisation (see split in darts)
- BDO: 1990–2011
- PDC: 2012–2016

WDF major events – best performances
- World Championship: Quarter-Final: 2006
- World Masters: Quarter-Final: 2002
- World Trophy: Semi-Final: 2005
- Int. Darts League: Last 16: 2005
- Finder Masters: Last 24 Group: 2004, 2005

Other tournament wins
- Tournament: Years
- England Open Rutherglen Open Scotland National Championships Scottish Masters Scottish Open Welsh Classic: 2006; 2009; 2008 1993; 2004; 2005
- Updated on 7 January 2008

Michael Veitch (born 15 August 1960) is a Scottish former professional darts player.

== Career ==
He made his televised debut at the 1990 Embassy World Championship losing in the first round to Brian Cairns, but it would be another 12 years before he returned to the Lakeside Country Club to play at the tournament again.

He has won several non-televised Open events including the Scottish Open in 2004, the Welsh Classic in 2005 and the England Open in 2006 – but has failed to make an impression in the World Championship. His best run at Lakeside came in 2006 when he beat Ulf Ceder and Stephen Roberts before losing to Martin Adams in the quarter-finals.

In 2016, Veitch played mostly on the PDC Challenge Tour Circuit. His best result of the year was a quarter final finish at the Benidorm Open.

=== Controversy ===
Veitch has been involved in some controversy during his career. At the 2007 BDO World Darts Championship he refused to shake hands with Mervyn King after his defeat in the last 16. King had been rumoured (which were subsequently true) to be joining the rival organisation, the Professional Darts Corporation. Veitch later said that he had been put off by King shouting whilst collecting his darts from the board.

At the 2007 Glencarn International Classic during a 7–0 win against Gary Robson, Veitch's mobile phone went off twice during the match causing upset to his opponent who offered to concede the match as a result of the incident.

== World Championship performances ==
=== BDO ===
- 1990: 1st round (lost to Brian Cairns 0–3) (sets)
- 2002: 1st round (lost to Co Stompé 0–3)
- 2005: 2nd round (lost to Raymond van Barneveld 1–3)
- 2006: Quarter-final (lost to Martin Adams 2–5)
- 2007: 2nd round (lost to Mervyn King 2–4)
- 2008: 1st round (lost to Scott Waites 1–3)
