= Marko Pusa =

Finnish darts player

Personal information
- Nickname: "The Flying Fin"
- Born: 15 April 1977 (age 49) Hollola, Finland
- Home town: Hollola, Finland

Sport
- Sport: Darts
- Playing since: 1995
- Laterality: Left-handed

Organisation (see split in darts)
- BDO: 1998–2005

WDF major events – best performances
- World Championship: Quarter Finals 2001
- World Masters: Semi Finals 1999
- World Trophy: Last 32 2002
- Finder Masters: Quarter Finals: 2000

Other tournament wins
- Tournament: Years
- Norway Open Finland Open WDF World Cup Team: 2001; 2005; 2005

Marko Pusa (born 15 April 1977) is a Finnish former darts player.

== Career ==
Pusa made his televised debut at the 1999 Winmau World Masters, reaching the semi-finals with wins over Andy Gudgeon, former World Champion Steve Beaton and Andy Jenkins before losing to Wayne Jones. In 2000, Pusa reached the final of the Finnish Open, losing to Mervyn King. In 2001, he made his debut at the BDO World Darts Championship, beating Colin Monk in the first round and then saw off Jez Porter in round two, averaging 101.40. He then faced then-Masters champion John Walton in the quarter-finals, where he lost 14 straight legs against the Englishman, a Lakeside record. Pusa went on to win just two legs as Walton won the match 5–0 and eventually became World Champion.

Pusa bounced back by winning the 2001 Norway Open, beating Kevin Painter in the final. He returned to Lakeside the next year, beating Matt Clark in the first round, but lost to Australian Tony David who like Walton the previous year, went on to win the tournament. Pusa won the 2005 Finnish Open, beating Sweden's Kenneth Hogwall in the semis before beating King in the final. Pusa has since not played on the circuit very often and is no longer ranked by the BDO or the WDF.

At one point, Pusa was ranked 17th in the world.

== World Championship Results ==
=== BDO ===
- 2001: Quarter-Finals (lost to John Walton 0–5)
- 2002: 2nd Round (lost to Tony David 1–3)
