= Anne Kirk =

Scottish darts player (born 1951)

Personal information
- Nickname: "Captain Kirk"
- Born: 6 April 1951 (age 75) Castle Douglas, Scotland

Sport
- Sport: Darts
- Playing since: 1977
- Darts: 24 Gram Tungsten
- Laterality: Right-handed
- Walk-on music: "Star Trekkin'" by The Firm

Organisation (see split in darts)
- BDO: 1997–2014

WDF major events – best performances
- World Championship: Women's Runner-up: 2003
- World Masters: Women's Winner (1) 2001
- World Trophy: Women's Semi-final: 2002, 2003

Other tournament wins
- Tournament: Years
- British Classic Dutch Open Pacific Masters Scottish Open Welsh Open: 1999; 2006; 2005; 1996, 1999; 1996, 1999

Anne Kirk (born 6 April 1951) is a Scottish former professional darts player. She was nicknamed "Captain Kirk".

== Career ==
Kirk won the 2001 Women's World Masters, beating American Marilyn Popp in the final. The following year, she reached the semi-finals of the 2002 Women's World Darts Trophy, beating Trina Gulliver in the quarter-finals before losing to Crissy Manley.

Kirk made her World Championship debut in 2003, and defeated Gaynor Williams and Francis Hoenselaar to reach the final. There, she was defeated by reigning champion Gulliver who made it a hat-trick of wins. She then lost in the quarter-finals in 2004 to Karin Krappen and in 2005 to Gulliver.

Kirk qualified for the 2009 Women's World Championship and faced Krappen in the quarter-finals, losing 1–2.

== World championship results ==
=== BDO ===
- 2003: Runner-up (lost to Trina Gulliver 0–2) (sets)
- 2004: Quarter Finals (lost to Karin Krappen 0–2)
- 2005: Quarter Finals (lost to Trina Gulliver 0–2)
- 2009: Quarter Finals (beat Karin Krappen 1–2)
