= 2008 WDF Europe Cup =

Tournament information
- Venue: Scandic Hotel Copenhagen
- Location: Copenhagen
- Country: Denmark
- Established: 27–30 August 2008
- Organisation(s): WDF
- Format: Legs

Champion(s)
- Singles (Wales) Mark Webster (men's singles); Louise Hepburn (women's singles); Pairs (England) Martin Adams & John Walton (men's pairs) (Sweden) Grethel Glasö & Carina Ekberg (women's pairs); Team; Denmark (men's team); Overall; Denmark (men's overall); Scotland (women's overall)

The 2008 WDF Europe Cup was the 16th edition of the WDF Europe Cup darts tournament, organised by the World Darts Federation. It was held in Copenhagen, Denmark from 27 to 30 August.

== Entered teams ==
23 countries/associations entered a men's selection in the event.

22 countries/associations entered a women's selection in the event.

Nr.	Country	Men's Selection
1	Austria	Günther Rimser, Franz Thaler, Alireza Ghafouri, Gregor Gorjup
2	Belgium	Ronny Huybrechts, Geert De Vos, Patrick Bulen, Dirk Hespeels
3	Czech Republic	Roman Schybal, Petr Hyncica, Vlastimil Jelinek, David Miklas
4	Denmark	Per Laursen, Frede Johansen, Preben Krabben, Stig Jørgensen
5	England	Darryl Fitton, Martin Adams, Tony O'Shea, John Walton
6	Finland	Jarkko Komula, Marko Kantele, Petri Korte, Vesa Nuutinen
7	Germany	Karsten Koch, Kevin Münch, Andreas Krockel, Andree Welge
8	Gibraltar	Dylan Duo, Dyson Parody, Henry Zapata, Justin Broton
9	Hungary	Romeo Gyalai, Pál Székely, Josef Rucska, Nandor Bezzeg
10	Iceland	Throsdur Ingimarsson, Gudjon Hauksson, Aegir Bjornsson, Thorgeir Gudmundson
11	Ireland	Stephen McDonnell, Eddie Cull, Martin McCloskey, Connie Finnan
12	Italy	Catallo Luca, Daniele Sergi, Marco Apollonio, Loris Polese
13	Latvia	Zanis Buklovskis, Kristaps Deksnis, Oskars Kovalevskis, Arnis Vents
14	Netherlands	Fabian Roosenbrand, Willy van de Wiel, Joey ten Berge, Daniel Brouwer
15	Northern Ireland	Michael Blair, David Glenn, Gary Elliot, Daryl Gurney
16	Norway	Jacques Langston, Øyvind Aasland, Robert Wagner, Vegar Elvevoll
17	Russia	Andrei Ratnikov, Lev Kuzmichev, Aleksei Kadochnikov, Igor Manturov
18	Scotland	John Henderson, Ross Montgomery, Paul Hanvidge, Mike Veitch
19	Spain	Antonio Alcinas, Leonard Pitman, Jesus Sanchez, Antonio Hibernon-Cano
20	Sweden	Oskar Lukasiak, Magnus Caris, Markus Korhonen, Daniel Larsson
21	Switzerland	Peter Maier, Pascal Barbezat, Peter Schonauer, Urs Von Rufs
22	Turkey	Bahadir Alev, Eser Tekin, Emre Toros, Arman Ugur
23	Wales	Mark Webster, Wayne Warren, Martin Phillips, Gareth Holt

Nr.	Country	Women's Selection
1	Austria	Barbara Kuntner & Claudia Rottmann
2	Belgium	Ann Goossens & Nicole Delie
3	Czech Republic	Alena Pavlikova & Katerina Cepelova
4	Denmark	Janni Larsen & Mette Funch
5	England	Trina Gulliver & Lisa Ashton
6	Finland	Sari Nikula & Tarja Salminen
7	Germany	Bianka Strauch & Monique Leßmeister
8	Hungary	Zsuzsanna Szarka & Nora Fekete
9	Iceland	Sigridur-Gudrun Jonsdottir & Arna-Rut Gunnlaugsottir
10	Ireland	Angela De Ward & Nicole O'Donovan
11	Italy	Veleda Gaiga & Giada Ciofi
12	Latvia	Zelite Putnina & Leva Brikmane-Buklovska
13	Netherlands	Carla Molema & Sharon Prins
14	Northern Ireland	Denise Cassidy & Grace Crane
15	Norway	Hege Løkken & Tone Eriksen-Wagner
16	Russia	Karina Nagapetynts & Irina Armstrong
17	Scotland	Susanna Young & Louise Hepburn
18	Spain	Paula Smith & Angela Costa-Garcia
19	Sweden	Carina Ekberg & Gretel Glasö
20	Switzerland	Rose-Marie Bussard & Denise Kochli
21	Turkey	Duygu Karaca & Meltem Giray
22	Wales	Jan Robbins & Julie Gore

== Men's singles ==
1st Round (best of 7 legs)
(Wales) Wayne Warren
Bye
(Sweden) Magnus Caris	1
(Scotland) Ross Montgomery	4
(Italy) Daniele Sergi
Bye
(Latvia) Oskars Kovalevskis
Bye
(Austria) Franz Thaler
Bye
(Republic of Ireland) Martin McCloskey
Bye
(Belgium) Ronny Huybrechts	3
(Norway) Robert Wagner	4
(Czech Republic) Roman Schybal
Bye
(Germany) Karsten Koch	2
(Finland) Marko Kantele	4
(Iceland) Aegir Bjornsson	3
(Northern Ireland) David Glenn	4
(Russia) Lev Kuzmichev
Bye
(Turkey) Arman Ugur
Bye
(Switzerland) Pascal Barbezat	4
(Hungary) Nandor Bezzeg	3
(England) Tony O'Shea	4
(Gibraltar) Justin Broton	1
(Spain) Leonard Pitman	2
(Netherlands) Fabian Roosenbrand	4
(Denmark) Per Laursen
Bye
(Scotland) Mike Veitch
Bye
(Czech Republic) Vlastimil Jelinek	1
(Finland) Vesa Nuutinen	4
(Norway) Vegar Elvevoll	3
(Sweden) Oskar Lukasiak	4
(Iceland) Throsdur Ingimarsson
Bye
(England) John Walton	4
(Belgium) Geert De Vos	2
(Republic of Ireland) Stephen McDonnell	3
(Wales) Gareth Holt	4
(Switzerland) Peter Schonauer	3
(Italy) Loris Polese	4
(Denmark) Stig Jørgensen
Bye
(Gibraltar) Dyson Parody
Bye
(Germany) Kevin Münch
Bye
(Russia) Andrei Ratnikov	4
(Latvia) Zanis Buklovskis	2
(Turkey) Emre Toros
Bye
(Hungary) Josef Rucska
Bye
(Austria) Alireza Ghafouri	4
(Spain) Jesus Sanchez	3
(Netherlands) Willy van de Wiel
Bye
(Northern Ireland) Daryl Gurney
Bye
(Sweden) Daniel Larsson
Bye
(Czech Republic) Petr Hyncica	2
(Italy) Marco Apollonio	4
(Spain) Antonio Alcinas
Bye
(Iceland) Gudjon Hauksson
Bye
(Hungary) Romeo Gyalai
Bye
(Russia) Aleksei Kadochnikov	0
(Wales) Mark Webster	4
(Germany) Andree Welge
Bye
(Denmark) Frede Johansen	4
(Turkey) Eser Tekin	3
(Norway) Jacques Langston
Bye
(Switzerland) Urs von Rufs	1
(Netherlands) Daniel Brouwer	4
(Scotland) John Henderson	4
(Latvia) Arnis Vents	0
(Gibraltar) Henry Zapata	0
(Republic of Ireland) Connie Finnan	4
(Austria) Günther Rimser	2
(Northern Ireland) Gary Elliot	4
(Belgium) Patrick Bulen
Bye
(England) Darryl Fitton
Bye
(Finland) Jarkko Komula
Bye
(Netherlands) Joey ten Berge
Bye
(Czech Republic) David Miklas	4
(Hungary) Pál Székely	2
(Switzerland) Peter Maier
Bye
(Finland) Petri Korte	4
(Turkey) Bahadir Alev	1
(Italy) Catallo Luca
Bye
(Austria) Gregor Gorjup
Bye
(Spain) Antonio Hibernon-Cano	1
(Germany) Andreas Kröckel	4
(Sweden) Markus Korhonen	4
(Denmark) Preben Krabben	3
(Republic of Ireland) Eddie Cull
Bye
(Latvia) Kristaps Deksnis
Bye
(Scotland) Paul Hanvidge
Bye
(Gibraltar) Dylan Duo	4
(Belgium) Dirk Hespeels	2
(Iceland) Thorgeir Gudmundson	1
(Wales) Martin Phillips	4
(Russia) Igor Manturov	1
(Northern Ireland) Michael Blair	4
(Norway) Øyvind Aasland
Bye
(England) Martin Adams
Bye

2nd Round (best of 7 legs)
(Wales) Wayne Warren	1
(Scotland) Ross Montgomery	4
(Italy) Daniele Sergi	4
(Latvia) Oskars Kovalevskis	0
(Austria) Franz Thaler	0
(Republic of Ireland) Martin McCloskey	4
(Norway) Robert Wagner	4
(Czech Republic) Roman Schybal	0
(Finland) Marko Kantele	4
(Northern Ireland) David Glenn	3
(Russia) Lev Kuzmichev	4
(Turkey) Arman Ugur	2
(Switzerland) Pascal Barbezat	0
(England) Tony O'Shea	4
(Netherlands) Fabian Roosenbrand	4
(Denmark) Per Laursen	2
(Scotland) Mike Veitch	3
(Finland) Vesa Nuutinen	4
(Sweden) Oskar Lukasiak	4
(Iceland) Throsdur Ingimarsson	0
(England) John Walton	4
(Wales) Gareth Holt	2
(Italy) Loris Polese	2
(Denmark) Stig Jørgensen	4
(Gibraltar) Dyson Parody	4
(Germany) Kevin Münch	3
(Russia) Andrei Ratnikov	4
(Turkey) Emre Toros	2
(Hungary) Josef Rucska	3
(Austria) Alireza Ghafouri	4
(Netherlands) Willy van de Wiel	2
(Northern Ireland) Daryl Gurney	4
(Sweden) Daniel Larsson	3
(Italy) Marco Apollonio	4
(Spain) Antonio Alcinas	4
(Iceland) Gudjon Hauksson	1
(Hungary) Romeo Gyalai	0
(Wales) Mark Webster	4
(Germany) Andree Welge	2
(Denmark) Frede Johansen	4
(Norway) Jacques Langston	2
(Netherlands) Daniel Brouwer	4
(Scotland) John Henderson	4
(Republic of Ireland) Connie Finnan	1
(Northern Ireland) Gary Elliot	1
(Belgium) Patrick Bulen	4
(England) Darryl Fitton	1
(Finland) Jarkko Komula	4
(Netherlands) Joey ten Berge	4
(Czech Republic) David Miklas	1
(Switzerland) Peter Maier	2
(Finland) Petri Korte	4
(Italy) Catallo Luca	3
(Austria) Gregor Gorjup	4
(Germany) Andreas Kröckel	4
(Sweden) Markus Korhonen	2
(Republic of Ireland) Eddie Cull	4
(Latvia) Kristaps Deksnis	3
(Scotland) Paul Hanvidge	4
(Gibraltar) Dylan Duo	2
(Wales) Martin Phillips	4
(Northern Ireland) Michael Blair	1
(Norway) Øyvind Aasland	0
(England) Martin Adams	4

3rd Round (best of 7 legs)
(Scotland) Ross Montgomery	2
(Italy) Daniele Sergi	4
(Republic of Ireland) Martin McCloskey	2
(Norway) Robert Wagner	4
(Finland) Marko Kantele	1
(Russia) Lev Kuzmichev	4
(England) Tony O'Shea	0
(Netherlands) Fabian Roosenbrand	4
(Finland) Vesa Nuutinen	2
(Sweden) Oskar Lukasiak	4
(England) John Walton	2
(Denmark) Stig Jørgensen	4
(Gibraltar) Dyson Parody	4
(Russia) Andrei Ratnikov	2
(Austria) Alireza Ghafouri	1
(Northern Ireland) Daryl Gurney	4
(Italy) Marco Apollonio	4
(Spain) Antonio Alcinas	3
(Wales) Mark Webster	4
(Denmark) Frede Johansen	0
(Netherlands) Daniel Brouwer	2
(Scotland) John Henderson	4
(Belgium) Patrick Bulen	1
(Finland) Jarkko Komula	4
(Netherlands) Joey ten Berge	3
(Finland) Petri Korte	4
(Austria) Gregor Gorjup	3
(Germany) Andreas Kröckel	4
(Republic of Ireland) Eddie Cull	2
(Scotland) Paul Hanvidge	4
(Wales) Martin Phillips	3
(England) Martin Adams	4

4th Round (best of 7 legs)
(Italy) Daniele Sergi	0
(Norway) Robert Wagner	4
(Russia) Lev Kuzmichev	1
(Netherlands) Fabian Roosenbrand	4
(Sweden) Oskar Lukasiak	3
(Denmark) Stig Jørgensen	4
(Gibraltar) Dyson Parody	2
(Northern Ireland) Daryl Gurney	4
(Italy) Marco Apollonio	2
(Wales) Mark Webster	4
(Scotland) John Henderson	4
(Finland) Jarkko Komula	3
(Finland) Petri Korte	0
(Germany) Andreas Kröckel	4
(Scotland) Paul Hanvidge	1
(England) Martin Adams	4

Quarter-finals (best of 7 legs)
(Norway) Robert Wagner	3
(Netherlands) Fabian Roosenbrand	4
(Denmark) Stig Jørgensen	1
(Northern Ireland) Daryl Gurney	4
(Wales) Mark Webster	4
(Scotland) John Henderson	2
(Germany) Andreas Kröckel	1
(England) Martin Adams	4

Semi-finals (best of 7 legs)
(Netherlands) Fabian Roosenbrand	0
(Northern Ireland) Daryl Gurney	4
Final (best of 7 legs)
(Northern Ireland) Daryl Gurney	0
(Wales) Mark Webster	4
(Wales) Mark Webster	4
(England) Martin Adams	2

== Men's pairs ==
1st Round (best of 7 legs)
(Scotland) Ross Montgomery (Scotland) Mike Veitch
Bye
(Spain) Antonio Hibernon-Cano (Spain) Antonio Alcinas	4
(Belgium) Dirk Hespeels (Belgium) Geert De Vos	2
(Austria) Gregor Gorjup (Austria) Gunther Rimser
Bye
(Norway) Vegar Elvevoll (Norway) Øyvind Aasland	4
(Gibraltar) Henry Zapata (Gibraltar) Dyson Parody	2
(Czech Republic) Vlastimil Jelinek (Czech Republic) Petr Hyncica	0
(England) John Walton (England) Martin Adams	4
(Germany) Andree Welge (Germany) Karsten Koch
Bye
(Switzerland) Peter Maier (Switzerland) Pascal Barbezat	4
(Hungary) Romeo Gyalai (Hungary) Pál Székely	0
(Denmark) Per Laursen (Denmark) Preben Krabben
Bye
(Sweden) Magnus Caris (Sweden) Markus Korhonen
Bye
(Republic of Ireland) Connie Finnan (Republic of Ireland) Martin McCloskey	4
(Russia) Aleksei Kadochnikov (Russia) Lev Kuzmichev	0
(Latvia) Zanis Buklovskis (Latvia) Oskars Kovalevskis
Bye
(Netherlands) Daniel Brouwer (Netherlands) Fabian Roosenbrand	3
(Wales) Wayne Warren (Wales) Gareth Holt	4
(Iceland) Throsdur Ingimarsson (Iceland) Aegir Bjornsson
Bye
(Finland) Petri Korte (Finland) Vesa Nuutinen	4
(Italy) Daniele Sergi (Italy) Marco Apollonio	2
(Turkey) Emre Toros (Turkey) Bahadir Alev
Bye
(Northern Ireland) David Glenn (Northern Ireland) Daryl Gurney
Bye
(Finland) Marko Kantele (Finland) Jarkko Komula
Bye
(Latvia) Arnis Vents (Latvia) Kristaps Deksnis	4
(Turkey) Arman Ugur (Turkey) Eser Tekin	1
(Republic of Ireland) Eddie Cull (Republic of Ireland) Stephen McDonnell
Bye
(Italy) Loris Polese (Italy) Catallo Luca	2
(Germany) Kevin Münch (Germany) Andreas Kröckel	4
(Russia) Andrei Ratnikov (Russia) Igor Manturov
Bye
(Gibraltar) Justin Broton (Gibraltar) Dylan Duo	0
(Czech Republic) David Miklas (Czech Republic) Roman Schybal	4
(Spain) Leonard Pitman (Spain) Jesus Sanchez
Bye
(Wales) Mark Webster (Wales) Martin Phillips
Bye
(Norway) Robert Wagner (Norway) Jacques Langston
Bye
(Switzerland) Peter Schonauer (Switzerland) Urs Von Rufs	1
(Austria) Alireza Ghafouri (Austria) Franz Thaler	4
(Iceland) Thorgeir Gudmundsson (Iceland) Gudjon Hauksson	4
(Denmark) Stig Jørgensen (Denmark) Frede Johansen	3
(Northern Ireland) Gary Elliot (Northern Ireland) Michael Blair	1
(Sweden) Daniel Larsson (Sweden) Oskar Lukasiak	4
(England) Tony O'Shea (England) Darryl Fitton
Bye
(Belgium) Ronny Huybrechts (Belgium) Patrick Bulen
Bye
(Hungary) Nandor Bezzeg (Hungary) Josef Rucska	1
(Scotland) John Henderson (Scotland) Paul Hanvidge	4
(Netherlands) Willy van de Wiel (Netherlands) Joey ten Berge
Bye

2nd Round (best of 7 legs)
(Scotland) Ross Montgomery (Scotland) Mike Veitch	4
(Spain) Antonio Hibernon-Cano (Spain) Antonio Alcinas	1
(Austria) Gregor Gorjup (Austria) Gunther Rimser	2
(Norway) Vegar Elvevoll (Norway) Øyvind Aasland	4
(England) John Walton (England) Martin Adams	4
(Germany) Andree Welge (Germany) Karsten Koch	3
(Switzerland) Peter Maier (Switzerland) Pascal Barbezat	0
(Denmark) Per Laursen (Denmark) Preben Krabben	4
(Sweden) Magnus Caris (Sweden) Markus Korhonen	4
(Republic of Ireland) Connie Finnan (Republic of Ireland) Martin McCloskey	2
(Latvia) Zanis Buklovskis (Latvia) Oskars Kovalevskis	0
(Wales) Wayne Warren (Wales) Gareth Holt	4
(Iceland) Throsdur Ingimarsson (Iceland) Aegir Bjornsson	0
(Finland) Petri Korte (Finland) Vesa Nuutinen	4
(Turkey) Emre Toros (Turkey) Bahadir Alev	4
(Northern Ireland) David Glenn (Northern Ireland) Daryl Gurney	0
(Finland) Marko Kantele (Finland) Jarkko Komula	4
(Latvia) Arnis Vents (Latvia) Kristaps Deksnis	2
(Republic of Ireland) Eddie Cull (Republic of Ireland) Stephen McDonnell	1
(Germany) Kevin Münch (Germany) Andreas Kröckel	4
(Russia) Andrei Ratnikov (Russia) Igor Manturov	4
(Czech Republic) David Miklas (Czech Republic) Roman Schybal	1
(Spain) Leonard Pitman (Spain) Jesus Sanchez	0
(Wales) Mark Webster (Wales) Martin Phillips	4
(Norway) Robert Wagner (Norway) Jacques Langston	1
(Austria) Alireza Ghafouri (Austria) Franz Thaler	4
(Iceland) Thorgeir Gudmundsson (Iceland) Gudjon Hauksson	4
(Sweden) Daniel Larsson (Sweden) Oskar Lukasiak	3
(England) Tony O'Shea (England) Darryl Fitton	1
(Belgium) Ronny Huybrechts (Belgium) Patrick Bulen	4
(Scotland) John Henderson (Scotland) Paul Hanvidge	4
(Netherlands) Willy van de Wiel (Netherlands) Joey ten Berge	2

3rd Round (best of 7 legs)
(Scotland) Ross Montgomery (Scotland) Mike Veitch	4
(Norway) Vegar Elvevoll (Norway) Øyvind Aasland	0
(England) John Walton (England) Martin Adams	4
(Denmark) Per Laursen (Denmark) Preben Krabben	0
(Sweden) Magnus Caris (Sweden) Markus Korhonen	4
(Wales) Wayne Warren (Wales) Gareth Holt	2
(Finland) Petri Korte (Finland) Vesa Nuutinen	4
(Turkey) Emre Toros (Turkey) Bahadir Alev	3
(Finland) Marko Kantele (Finland) Jarkko Komula	4
(Germany) Kevin Münch (Germany) Andreas Kröckel	1
(Russia) Andrei Ratnikov (Russia) Igor Manturov	0
(Wales) Mark Webster (Wales) Martin Phillips	4
(Austria) Alireza Ghafouri (Austria) Franz Thaler	4
(Iceland) Thorgeir Gudmundsson (Iceland) Gudjon Hauksson	1
(Belgium) Ronny Huybrechts (Belgium) Patrick Bulen	1
(Scotland) John Henderson (Scotland) Paul Hanvidge	4

Quarter-finals (best of 7 legs)
(Scotland) Ross Montgomery (Scotland) Mike Veitch	0
(England) John Walton (England) Martin Adams	4
(Sweden) Magnus Caris (Sweden) Markus Korhonen	4
(Finland) Petri Korte (Finland) Vesa Nuutinen	1
(Finland) Marko Kantele (Finland) Jarkko Komula	4
(Wales) Mark Webster (Wales) Martin Phillips	1
(Austria) Alireza Ghafouri (Austria) Franz Thaler	1
(Scotland) John Henderson (Scotland) Paul Hanvidge	4

Semi-finals (best of 7 legs)
(England) John Walton (England) Martin Adams	4
(Sweden) Magnus Caris (Sweden) Markus Korhonen	2
(Finland) Marko Kantele (Finland) Jarkko Komula	4
(Scotland) John Henderson (Scotland) Paul Hanvidge	2

Final (best of 7 legs)
(England) John Walton (England) Martin Adams	4
(Finland) Marko Kantele (Finland) Jarkko Komula	2

== Men's team ==
Round Robin

Group A

Pos	Team	Pld	Win	Lose	LF	LA	+/−
1	Denmark	5	5	0	45	17	+28
2	Netherlands	5	4	1	43	22	+21
3	Ireland	5	2	3	32	34	−2
4	Iceland	5	2	3	25	33	−8
5	Turkey	5	1	4	23	42	−19
6	Switzerland	5	1	4	21	41	−20

- Denmark 9 – 7 Netherlands
- Denmark 9 – 5 Ireland
- Denmark 9 – 0 Iceland
- Denmark 9 – 5 Turkey
- Denmark 9 – 0 Switzerland
- Netherlands 9 – 6 Ireland
- Netherlands 9 – 2 Iceland
- Netherlands 9 – 3 Turkey
- Netherlands 9 – 2 Switzerland
- Ireland 9 – 3 Turkey
- Ireland 9 – 4 Switzerland
- Iceland 9 – 3 Ireland
- Iceland 9 – 3 Turkey
- Turkey 9 – 3 Switzerland
- Switzerland 9 – 5 Iceland

Group B

Pos	Team	Pld	Win	Lose	LF	LA	+/−
1	England	5	5	0	45	17	+28
2	Wales	5	4	1	43	28	+15
3	Sweden	5	3	2	36	36	0
4	Hungary	5	2	3	29	33	−4
5	Russia	5	1	4	23	39	−16
6	Gibraltar	5	0	5	22	45	−23

- England 9 – 7 Wales
- England 9 – 6 Sweden
- England 9 – 0 Hungary
- England 9 – 3 Russia
- England 9 – 1 Gibraltar
- Wales 9 – 7 Sweden
- Wales 9 – 6 Hungary
- Wales 9 – 3 Russia
- Wales 9 – 7 Gibraltar
- Sweden 9 – 5 Hungary
- Sweden 9 – 5 Russia
- Sweden 9 – 8 Gibraltar
- Hungary 9 – 3 Russia
- Hungary 9 – 3 Gibraltar
- Russia 9 – 3 Gibraltar

Group C

Pos	Team	Pld	Win	Lose	LF	LA	+/−
1	Germany	5	5	0	45	20	+25
2	Scotland	5	4	1	39	23	+16
3	Norway	5	3	2	32	26	+6
4	Italy	5	2	3	37	32	+5
5	Austria	5	1	4	26	39	−13
6	Latvia	5	0	5	6	45	−39

- Germany 9 – 3 Scotland
- Germany 9 – 3 Norway
- Germany 9 – 7 Italy
- Germany 9 – 6 Austria
- Germany 9 – 1 Latvia
- Scotland 9 – 2 Norway
- Scotland 9 – 7 Italy
- Scotland 9 – 5 Austria
- Scotland 9 – 0 Latvia
- Norway 9 – 5 Italy
- Norway 9 – 2 Austria
- Norway 9 – 1 Latvia
- Italy 9 – 4 Austria
- Italy 9 – 1 Latvia
- Austria 9 – 3 Latvia

Group D

Pos	Team	Pld	Win	Lose	LF	LA	+/−
1	Northern Ireland	4	4	0	36	23	+13
2	Finland	4	3	1	34	19	+15
3	Belgium	4	1	3	29	30	−1
4	Spain	4	1	3	22	35	−13
5	Czech Republic	4	1	3	21	35	−14

- Northern Ireland 9 – 7 Finland
- Northern Ireland 9 – 5 Belgium
- Northern Ireland 9 – 7 Spain
- Northern Ireland 9 – 4 Czech Republic
- Finland 9 – 7 Belgium
- Finland 9 – 3 Spain
- Finland 9 – 0 Czech Republic
- Belgium 9 – 3 Spain
- Spain 9 – 8 Czech Republic
- Czech Republic 9 – 8 Belgium

Knock Out

Quarter-finals (best of 17 legs)
A1	Denmark	9
D2	Finland	5
B1	England	8
C2	Scotland	9
C1	Germany	9
B2	Wales	6
D1	Northern Ireland	5
A2	Netherlands	9

Semi-finals (best of 17 legs)
A1	Denmark	9
C2	Scotland	8
C1	Germany	4
A2	Netherlands	9

Final (best of 17 legs)
A1	Denmark	9
A2	Netherlands	8

== Women's singles ==
1st Round (best of 7 legs)
(England) Lisa Ashton
Bye
(Italy) Veleda Gaiga	4
(Republic of Ireland) Nicole O'Donovan	1
(Austria) Barbara Kuntner	4
(Turkey) Duygu Karaca	0
(Denmark) Mette Funch
Bye
(Wales) Julie Gore	4
(Netherlands) Sharon Prins	0
(Finland) Sari Nikula
Bye
(Czech Republic) Alena Pavlikova
Bye
(Sweden) Carina Ekberg
Bye
(Germany) Bianka Strauch
Bye
(Spain) Angela Costa-Garcia
Bye
(Germany) Irina Armstrong
Bye
(Switzerland) Rose-Marie Bussard
Bye
(Belgium) Ann Goossens	0
(Scotland) Susanna Young	4
(Iceland) Sigridur-Gudrun Jonsdottir	1
(Latvia) Leva Brikmane-Buklovska	4
(Hungary) Zsuzsanna Szarka	4
(Norway) Tone Eriksen-Wagner	3
(Northern Ireland) Denise Cassidy
Bye
(Wales) Jan Robbins
Bye
(England) Trina Gulliver	4
(Hungary) Nora Fekete	1
(Germany) Monique Leßmeister	1
(Denmark) Janni Larsen	4
(Iceland) Arna-Rut Gunnlaugsottir
Bye
(Latvia) Zelite Putnina
Bye
(Belgium) Nicole Delie	1
(Russia) Karina Nagapetynts	4
(Austria) Claudia Rottmann
Bye
(Norway) Hege Løkken
Bye
(Netherlands) Carla Molema
Bye
(Turkey) Meltem Giray	3
(Czech Republic) Katerina Cepelova	4
(Sweden) Gretel Glasö
Bye
(Republic of Ireland) Angela De Ward
Bye
(Finland) Tarja Salminen	4
(Switzerland) Denise Kochli	0
(Italy) Giada Ciofi
Bye
(Spain) Paula Smith	0
(Northern Ireland) Grace Crane	4
(Scotland) Louise Hepburn
Bye

2nd Round (best of 7 legs)
(England) Lisa Ashton	4
(Italy) Veleda Gaiga	0
(Austria) Barbara Kuntner	1
(Denmark) Mette Funch	4
(Wales) Julie Gore	4
(Finland) Sari Nikula	3
(Czech Republic) Alena Pavlikova	0
(Sweden) Carina Ekberg	4
(Germany) Bianka Strauch	4
(Spain) Angela Costa-Garcia	0
(Germany) Irina Armstrong	4
(Switzerland) Rose-Marie Bussard	0
(Scotland) Susanna Young	4
(Latvia) Leva Brikmane-Buklovska	1
(Hungary) Zsuzsanna Szarka	1
(Northern Ireland) Denise Cassidy	4
(Wales) Jan Robbins	4
(England) Trina Gulliver	3
(Denmark) Janni Larsen	4
(Iceland) Arna-Rut Gunnlaugsottir	0
(Latvia) Zelite Putnina	1
(Russia) Karina Nagapetynts	4
(Austria) Claudia Rottmann	4
(Norway) Hege Løkken	3
(Netherlands) Carla Molema	4
(Czech Republic) Katerina Cepelova	2
(Sweden) Gretel Glasö	1
(Republic of Ireland) Angela De Ward	4
(Finland) Tarja Salminen	4
(Italy) Giada Ciofi	1
(Northern Ireland) Grace Crane	1
(Scotland) Louise Hepburn	4

3rd Round (best of 7 legs)
(England) Lisa Ashton	4
(Denmark) Mette Funch	1
(Wales) Julie Gore	3
(Sweden) Carina Ekberg	4
(Germany) Bianka Strauch	2
(Germany) Irina Armstrong	4
(Scotland) Susanna Young	4
(Northern Ireland) Denise Cassidy	3
(Wales) Jan Robbins	3
(Denmark) Janni Larsen	4
(Russia) Karina Nagapetynts	4
(Austria) Claudia Rottmann	0
(Netherlands) Carla Molema	4
(Republic of Ireland) Angela De Ward	2
(Finland) Tarja Salminen	3
(Scotland) Louise Hepburn	4

Quarter-finals (best of 7 legs)
(England) Lisa Ashton	4
(Sweden) Carina Ekberg	0
(Germany) Irina Armstrong	1
(Scotland) Susanna Young	4
(Denmark) Janni Larsen	4
(Russia) Karina Nagapetynts	2
(Netherlands) Carla Molema	2
(Scotland) Louise Hepburn	4

Semi-finals (best of 7 legs)
(England) Lisa Ashton	4
(Scotland) Susanna Young	0
(Denmark) Janni Larsen	3
(Scotland) Louise Hepburn	4

Final (best of 7 legs)
(England) Lisa Ashton	0
(Scotland) Louise Hepburn	4

== Women's pairs ==
Round Robin

Group A

Pos	Team	Pld	Win	Lose	LF	LA	+/−
1	(England) Trina Gulliver (England) Lisa Ashton	5	5	0	20	3	+17
2	(Finland) Sari Nikula (Finland) Tarja Salminen	5	3	2	14	9	+5
3	(Denmark) Janni Larsen (Denmark) Mette Funch	5	3	2	14	11	+3
4	(Latvia) Zelite Putnina (Latvia) Leva Brikmane-Buklovska	5	3	2	13	10	+3
5	(Czech Republic) Alena Pavlikova (Czech Republic) Katerina Cepelova	5	1	4	8	16	−8
6	(Iceland) Sigridur-Gudrun Jonsdottir (Iceland) Arna-Rut Gunnlaugsottir	5	0	5	0	20	−20

- (England) Trina Gulliver & Lisa Ashton 4 – 1 (Finland) Sari Nikula & Tarja Salminen
- (England) Trina Gulliver & Lisa Ashton 4 – 1 (Denmark) Janni Larsen & Mette Funch
- (England) Trina Gulliver & Lisa Ashton 4 – 0 (Latvia) Zelite Putnina & Leva Brikmane-Buklovska
- (England) Trina Gulliver & Lisa Ashton 4 – 1 (Czech Republic) Alena Pavlikova & Katerina Cepelova
- (England) Trina Gulliver & Lisa Ashton 4 – 0 (Iceland) Sigridur-Gudrun Jonsdottir & Arna-Rut Gunnlaugsottir
- (Finland) Sari Nikula & Tarja Salminen 4 – 1 (Denmark) Janni Larsen & Mette Funch
- (Finland) Sari Nikula & Tarja Salminen 4 – 0 (Czech Republic) Alena Pavlikova & Katerina Cepelova
- (Finland) Sari Nikula & Tarja Salminen 4 – 0 (Iceland) Sigridur-Gudrun Jonsdottir & Arna-Rut Gunnlaugsottir
- (Denmark) Janni Larsen & Mette Funch 4 – 1 (Latvia) Zelite Putnina & Leva Brikmane-Buklovska
- (Denmark) Janni Larsen & Mette Funch 4 – 2 (Czech Republic) Alena Pavlikova & Katerina Cepelova
- (Denmark) Janni Larsen & Mette Funch 4 – 0 (Iceland) Sigridur-Gudrun Jonsdottir & Arna-Rut Gunnlaugsottir
- (Latvia) Zelite Putnina & Leva Brikmane-Buklovska 4 – 1 (Finland) Sari Nikula & Tarja Salminen
- (Latvia) Zelite Putnina & Leva Brikmane-Buklovska 4 – 1 (Czech Republic) Alena Pavlikova & Katerina Cepelova
- (Latvia) Zelite Putnina & Leva Brikmane-Buklovska 4 – 0 (Iceland) Sigridur-Gudrun Jonsdottir & Arna-Rut Gunnlaugsottir
- (Czech Republic) Alena Pavlikova & Katerina Cepelova 4 – 0 (Iceland) Sigridur-Gudrun Jonsdottir & Arna-Rut Gunnlaugsottir

Group B

Pos	Team	Pld	Win	Lose	LF	LA	+/−
1	(Russia) Karina Nagapetynts (Russia) Irina Armstrong	4	4	0	16	4	+12
2	(Netherlands) Carla Molema (Netherlands) Sharon Prins	4	3	1	13	5	+8
3	(Northern Ireland) Denise Cassidy (Northern Ireland) Grace Crane	4	2	2	11	9	+2
4	(Turkey) Duygu Karaca (Turkey) Meltem Giray	4	1	3	6	13	−7
5	(Spain) Paula Smith (Spain) Angela Costa-Garcia	4	0	4	1	16	−15

- (Russia) Karina Nagapetynts & Irina Armstrong 4 – 1 (Netherlands) Carla Molema & Sharon Prins
- (Russia) Karina Nagapetynts & Irina Armstrong 4 – 2 (Northern Ireland) Denise Cassidy & Grace Crane
- (Russia) Karina Nagapetynts & Irina Armstrong 4 – 1 (Turkey) Duygu Karaca & Meltem Giray
- (Russia) Karina Nagapetynts & Irina Armstrong 4 – 0 (Spain) Paula Smith & Angela Costa-Garcia
- (Netherlands) Carla Molema & Sharon Prins 4 – 1 (Northern Ireland) Denise Cassidy & Grace Crane
- (Netherlands) Carla Molema & Sharon Prins 4 – 0 (Turkey) Duygu Karaca & Meltem Giray
- (Netherlands) Carla Molema & Sharon Prins 4 – 0 (Spain) Paula Smith & Angela Costa-Garcia
- (Northern Ireland) Denise Cassidy & Grace Crane 4 – 1 (Turkey) Duygu Karaca & Meltem Giray
- (Northern Ireland) Denise Cassidy & Grace Crane 4 – 0 (Spain) Paula Smith & Angela Costa-Garcia
- (Turkey) Duygu Karaca & Meltem Giray 4 – 1 (Spain) Paula Smith & Angela Costa-Garcia

Group C

Pos	Team	Pld	Win	Lose	LF	LA	+/−
1	(Scotland) Susanna Young (Scotland) Louise Hepburn	4	3	1	15	8	+7
2	(Hungary) Zsuzsanna Szarka (Hungary) Nora Fekete	4	2	2	13	9	+4
3	(Germany) Bianka Strauch (Germany) Monique Leßmeister	4	2	2	9	10	−1
4	(Norway) Hege Løkken (Norway) Tone Eriksen-Wagner	4	2	2	10	12	−2
5	(Italy) Veleda Gaiga (Italy) Giada Ciofi	4	1	3	7	15	−8

- (Scotland) Susanna Young & Louise Hepburn 4 – 2 (Hungary) Zsuzsanna Szarka & Nora Fekete
- (Scotland) Susanna Young & Louise Hepburn 4 – 1 (Germany) Bianka Strauch & Monique Leßmeister
- (Scotland) Susanna Young & Louise Hepburn 4 – 1 (Norway) Hege Løkken & Tone Eriksen-Wagner
- (Hungary) Zsuzsanna Szarka & Nora Fekete 4 – 0 (Germany) Bianka Strauch & Monique Leßmeister
- (Hungary) Zsuzsanna Szarka & Nora Fekete 4 – 1 (Italy) Veleda Gaiga & Giada Ciofi
- (Germany) Bianka Strauch & Monique Leßmeister 4 – 1 (Norway) Hege Løkken & Tone Eriksen-Wagner
- (Germany) Bianka Strauch & Monique Leßmeister 4 – 1 (Italy) Veleda Gaiga & Giada Ciofi
- (Norway) Hege Løkken & Tone Eriksen-Wagner 4 – 3 (Hungary) Zsuzsanna Szarka & Nora Fekete
- (Norway) Hege Løkken & Tone Eriksen-Wagner 4 – 1 (Italy) Veleda Gaiga & Giada Ciofi
- (Italy) Veleda Gaiga & Giada Ciofi 4 – 3 (Scotland) Susanna Young & Louise Hepburn

Group D

Pos	Team	Pld	Win	Lose	LF	LA	+/−
1	(Wales) Jan Robbins (Wales) Julie Gore	5	5	0	20	10	+10
2	(Sweden) Carina Ekberg (Sweden) Gretel Glasö	5	4	1	19	10	+9
3	(Republic of Ireland) Angela De Ward (Republic of Ireland) Nicole O'Donovan	5	3	2	18	10	+8
4	(Switzerland) Rose-Marie Bussard (Switzerland) Denise Kochli	5	1	4	9	16	−7
5	(Austria) Barbara Kuntner (Austria) Claudia Rottmann	5	1	4	7	16	−9
6	(Belgium) Ann Goossens (Belgium) Nicole Delie	5	1	4	8	19	−11

- (Wales) Jan Robbins & Julie Gore 4 – 3 (Sweden) Carina Ekberg & Gretel Glasö
- (Wales) Jan Robbins & Julie Gore 4 – 3 (Republic of Ireland) Angela De Ward & Nicole O'Donovan
- (Wales) Jan Robbins & Julie Gore 4 – 1 (Switzerland) Rose-Marie Bussard & Denise Kochli
- (Wales) Jan Robbins & Julie Gore 4 – 1 (Austria) Barbara Kuntner & Claudia Rottmann
- (Wales) Jan Robbins & Julie Gore 4 – 2 (Belgium) Ann Goossens & Nicole Delie
- (Sweden) Carina Ekberg & Gretel Glasö 4 – 3 (Republic of Ireland) Angela De Ward & Nicole O'Donovan
- (Sweden) Carina Ekberg & Gretel Glasö 4 – 0 (Switzerland) Rose-Marie Bussard & Denise Kochli
- (Sweden) Carina Ekberg & Gretel Glasö 4 – 2 (Austria) Barbara Kuntner & Claudia Rottmann
- (Sweden) Carina Ekberg & Gretel Glasö 4 – 1 (Belgium) Ann Goossens & Nicole Delie
- (Republic of Ireland) Angela De Ward & Nicole O'Donovan 4 – 1 (Switzerland) Rose-Marie Bussard & Denise Kochli
- (Republic of Ireland) Angela De Ward & Nicole O'Donovan 4 – 0 (Austria) Barbara Kuntner & Claudia Rottmann
- (Republic of Ireland) Angela De Ward & Nicole O'Donovan 4 – 1 (Belgium) Ann Goossens & Nicole Delie
- (Switzerland) Rose-Marie Bussard & Denise Kochli 4 – 0 (Austria) Barbara Kuntner & Claudia Rottmann
- (Austria) Barbara Kuntner & Claudia Rottmann 4 – 0 (Belgium) Ann Goossens & Nicole Delie
- (Belgium) Ann Goossens & Nicole Delie 4 – 3 (Switzerland) Rose-Marie Bussard & Denise Kochli

Knock Out

Quarter-finals (best of 7 legs)
A1	(England) Trina Gulliver (England) Lisa Ashton	3
D2	(Sweden) Carina Ekberg (Sweden) Gretel Glasö	4
B1	(Russia) Karina Nagapetynts (Russia) Irina Armstrong	4
C2	(Hungary) Zsuzsanna Szarka (Hungary) Nora Fekete	1
C1	(Scotland) Susanna Young (Scotland) Louise Hepburn	4
B2	(Netherlands) Carla Molema (Netherlands) Sharon Prins	3
D1	(Wales) Jan Robbins (Wales) Julie Gore	4
A2	(Finland) Sari Nikula (Finland) Tarja Salminen	2

Semi-finals (best of 7 legs)
D2	(Sweden) Carina Ekberg (Sweden) Gretel Glasö	4
B1	(Russia) Karina Nagapetynts (Russia) Irina Armstrong	1
C1	(Scotland) Susanna Young (Scotland) Louise Hepburn	1
D1	(Wales) Jan Robbins (Wales) Julie Gore	4

Final (best of 7 legs)
D2	(Sweden) Carina Ekberg (Sweden) Gretel Glasö	4
D1	(Wales) Jan Robbins (Wales) Julie Gore	1
