= 2008 Zuiderduin Masters =

Zuiderduin Masters

Tournament information
- Dates: 12 December 2008 – 14 December 2008
- Venue: Hotel Zuiderduin
- Location: Egmond aan Zee
- Country: North Holland, the Netherlands
- Organisation(s): BDO / WDF
- Format: Legs (group stage); Sets (from Quarter-finals); Final – best of 9 Sets

Champion(s)
- (Scotland) Gary Anderson

The 2008 Zuiderduin Darts Masters was a darts competition held from December 12 to December 14, 2008, in Egmond aan Zee, Netherlands, run by the British Darts Organisation and the World Darts Federation. Having been an unranked event in previous years, it was installed as a major tournament in the BDO/WDF darts calendar, following the disbanding of the International Darts League and the World Darts Trophy. Also, for the first time, a women's competition was held.

In the men's event, number one seed Gary Anderson defended his title with a 5–4 win over number two seed, Scott Waites. The women's event was won by Lisa Ashton, who replaced the initial top seed Anastasia Dobromyslova following her withdrawal, beating Trina Gulliver in the final.

== Results ==
=== Men's tournament ===
==== Group stage ====
all matches best of 9 legs.
P = Played; W = Won; L = Lost; LF = Legs for; LA = Legs against; +/− = Leg difference; Pts = Points

Group A

Pos	Name	P	W	L	LF	LA	+/−	Pts
1	(Scotland) Gary Anderson (1)	2	2	0	10	4	+6	4
2	(England) Steve West	2	1	1	5	9	−4	2
3	(England) Ted Hankey	2	0	2	8	10	−2	0

Steve West 86.25 5–4 Ted Hankey 90.75
Gary Anderson 95.43 5–4 Ted Hankey 95.70
Gary Anderson 101.55 5–0 Steve West 76.26

Group B

Pos	Name	P	W	L	LF	LA	+/−	Pts
1	(England) Darryl Fitton (8)	2	2	0	10	5	+5	4
2	(Netherlands) Mareno Michels	2	1	1	8	6	+2	2
3	(England) Stuart Kellett	2	0	2	3	10	−7	0

Mareno Michels 90.60 5–1 Stuart Kellett 82.65
Darryl Fitton 95.46 5–2 Stuart Kellett 88.05
Darryl Fitton 88.14 5–3 Mareno Michels 88.13

Group C

Pos	Name	P	W	L	LF	LA	+/−	Pts
1	(Netherlands) Henny van der Ster	2	2	0	10	6	+4	4
2	(Wales) Mark Webster (5)	2	1	1	9	9	0	2
3	(England) Martin Atkins	2	0	2	6	10	−4	0

Henny van der Ster 83.13 5–2 Martin Atkins 80.88
Mark Webster 95.76 5–4 Martin Atkins 90.15
Henny van der Ster 82.53 5–4 Mark Webster 81.66

Group D

Pos	Name	P	W	L	LF	LA	+/−	Pts
1	(England) Alan Norris	2	2	0	10	5	+5	4
2	(England) Martin Adams (4)	2	1	1	8	6	+2	2
3	(Belgium) Geert De Vos	2	0	2	3	10	−7	0

Alan Norris 86.16 5–2 Geert De Vos 80.82
Martin Adams 97.71 5–1 Geert De Vos 78.24
Alan Norris 85.80 5–3 Martin Adams 76.26

Group E

Pos	Name	P	W	L	LF	LA	+/−	Pts
1	(England) Gary Robson (3)	2	2	0	10	3	+7	4
2	(England) Brian Woods	2	1	1	5	9	−4	2
3	(Netherlands) Willy van de Wiel	2	0	2	1	10	−9	0

Brian Woods 95.13 5–0 Willy van de Wiel 80.79
Gary Robson 89.88 5–1 Willy van de Wiel 83.85
Gary Robson 94.53 5–2 Brian Woods 86.94

Group F

Pos	Name	P	W	L	LF	LA	+/−	Pts
1	(England) Tony O'Shea (6)	2	2	0	10	7	+3	4
2	(Netherlands) Joey ten Berge	2	1	1	9	8	+1	2
3	(England) Andy Boulton	2	0	2	6	10	−4	0

Joey ten Berge 92.58 5–3 Andy Boulton 87.27
Tony O'Shea 94.32 5–3 Andy Boulton 90.81
Tony O'Shea 91.32 5–4 Joey ten Berge 88.80

Group G

Pos	Name	P	W	L	LF	LA	+/−	Pts
1	(Wales) Martin Phillips	2	1	1	9	6	+3	2
2	(Scotland) Mark Barilli	2	1	1	8	9	−1	2
3	(Netherlands) Edwin Max (7)	2	1	1	6	8	−2	2

Mark Barilli 89.82 5–4 Martin Phillips 83.67
Martin Phillips 98.31 5–1 Edwin Max 86.37
Edwin Max 83.79 5–3 Mark Barilli 84.36

Group H

Pos	Name	P	W	L	LF	LA	+/−	Pts
1	(England) Scott Waites (2)	2	1	1	9	5	+4	2
2	(Scotland) Ross Montgomery	2	1	1	7	9	−2	2
3	(England) Davy Richardson	2	1	1	5	7	−2	2

Davy Richardson 90.45 5–2 Ross Montgomery 84.15
Ross Montgomery 86.67 5–4 Scott Waites 87.63
Scott Waites 88.41 5–0 Davy Richardson 75.72

==== Knockout stages ====
Quarter-finals; Best of 5 sets
1	(Scotland) Gary Anderson 91.14	3
8	(England) Darryl Fitton 90.06	2
(Netherlands) Henny van der Ster 94.89	3
(Sweden) Alan Norris 88.50	1
3	(England) Gary Robson 88.89	1
6	(England) Tony O'Shea 95.16	3
(Wales) Martin Phillips 90.42	1
2	(England) Scott Waites 89.46	3

Semi-finals; Best of 5 sets
1	(Scotland) Gary Anderson 93.51	3
(Netherlands) Henny van der Ster 84.45	0
6	(England) Tony O'Shea 89.58	2
2	(England) Scott Waites 94.20	3

Final; Best of 9 sets
1	(Scotland) Gary Anderson 99.21	5
2	(England) Scott Waites 93.75	4

=== Women's tournament ===
Quarter-finals; Best of 7 legs
1	(England) Trina Gulliver 74.82	4
(Netherlands) Carla Molema 73.26	2
4	(Netherlands) Karin Krappen 70.17	4
(Netherlands) Rilana Erades 67.08	2
2	(Netherlands) Francis Hoenselaar 70.17	4
(Germany) Monique Leßmeister 67.62	3
3	(Wales) Julie Gore 71.13	3
(England) Lisa Ashton 73.47	4

Semi-finals; Best of 7 legs
1	(England) Trina Gulliver 73.80	4
4	(Netherlands) Karin Krappin 74.64	2
3	(Netherlands) Francis Hoenselaar 69.09	1
(England) Lisa Ashton 77.04	4

Final; Best of 3 sets
1	(England) Trina Gulliver 65.91	0
(England) Lisa Ashton 78.42	2
