= Antwerp Open =

Tournament information
- Venue: Belgica Loods
- Location: Antwerp
- Country: Belgium
- Established: 1988
- Organisation(s): World Darts Federation (WDF)
- Format: Sets (2000–2016); Legs (2017–)
- Prize fund: €7,200
- Month(s) Played: August

Current champion(s)
- Jimmy van Schie (men's); Lisa Zollikofer (women's)

The Antwerp Open is a darts tournament that has been held annually since 1988.

== List of winners ==
=== Men's ===
| Year | Champion | Score | Runner-up | Total Prize Money | Champion | Runner-up |
|---|---|---|---|---|---|---|
| 1988 | (United States) Steve Brown | ?–? | (England) Graham Miller | ? | ? | ? |
| 1989 | (United States) Steve Brown | ?–? | (Belgium) Edward Leyland | ? | ? | ? |
| 1990 | (Belgium) Leo Laurens | ?–? | (Belgium) Frans Devooght | ? | ? | ? |
| 1991 | (Belgium) Stefan Eeckelaert | ?–? | (Belgium) Jef van Heertum | ? | ? | ? |
| 1992 | (Belgium) Jef van Heertum | ?–? | (Netherlands) Raymond van Barneveld | ? | ? | ? |
| 1993 | (England) Mike Gregory | ?–? | (Belgium) Jef Scheyltjens | ? | ? | ? |
| 1994 | (England) Dennis Priestley | ?–? | (England) Rod Harrington | ? | ? | ? |
| 1995 | (England) Dennis Priestley | ?–? | (Scotland) Jocky Wilson | ? | ? | ? |
| 1996 | (England) Bob Anderson | ?–? | (England) Keith Deller | ? | ? | ? |
| 1997 | Phil Taylor | ?–? | (England) Alan Warriner-Little | ? | ? | ? |
| 1998 | Phil Taylor | ?–? | (England) Rod Harrington | ? | ? | ? |
| 1999 | Mervyn King | ?–? | Chris Mason | ? | ? | ? |
| 2000 | (Scotland) Jamie Harvey | 3–2 (s) | Roland Scholten | ? | ? | ? |
| 2001 | Martin Adams | 3–1 (s) | (England) Paul Williams | ? | ? | ? |
| 2002 | Colin Lloyd | 3–1 (s) | Kevin Painter | ? | ? | ? |
| 2003 | Colin Lloyd | 3–2 (s) | (England) Mick Manning | ? | ? | ? |
| 2004 | Colin Lloyd | 3–2 (s) | (England) Alex Roy | €11,380 | €2,500 | €1,250 |
| 2005 | Terry Jenkins | 3–0 (s) | (Netherlands) Mikel van Maastrigt | €11,380 | €2,500 | €1,250 |
| 2006 | Terry Jenkins | 3–0 (s) | (England) Steve Maish | €11,380 | €2,500 | €1,250 |
| 2007 | (England) Terry Jenkins | 3–0 (s) | (England) Andy Smith | €11,380 | €2,500 | €1,250 |
| 2008 | Andy Hamilton | 3–1 (s) | (England) Matt Clark | €10,360 | €2,000 | €1,000 |
| 2009 | Ian White | 3–0 (s) | (England) Ted Hankey | €9,500 | €2,500 | €1,000 |
| 2010 | (England) Stuart Kellett | 3–2 (s) | (Netherlands) Gino Vos | €9,500 | €2,500 | €1,000 |
| 2011 | (England) Tony West | 3–1 (s) | (Netherlands) Frans Harmsen | €9,080 | €2,300 | €1,000 |
| 2012 | (Netherlands) Joppe Bakens | 3–0 (s) | (Netherlands) Willy van de Wiel | €9,080 | €2,500 | €1,000 |
| 2013 | (England) Martin Adams | 3–2 (s) | (England) Robbie Green | €6,080 | €1,850 | €750 |
| 2014 | (England) Jamie Hughes | 3–2 (s) | (England) Martin Adams | €6,080 | €1,850 | €750 |
| 2015 | Jim Williams | 3–0 (s) | (Belgium) Sven Verdonck | €6,540 | €2,300 | €1,000 |
| 2016 | (Netherlands) Jimmy Hendriks | 3–0 (s) | (England) Martin Atkins | €6,540 | €2,300 | €1,000 |
| 2017 | (Wales) Jim Williams | 9–2 (l) | (Scotland) Ross Montgomery | €6,540 | €2,300 | €1,000 |
| 2018 | (Netherlands) Wouter Vaes | 7–5 (l) | Mario Vandenbogaerde | €5,890 | €1,500 | €750 |
| 2019 | Wayne Warren | 7–5 (l) | Gary Stone | €5,600 | €1,600 | €800 |
| 2022 | Jamie Lewis | 7–5 (l) | Kay Smeets | €5,600 | €1,600 | €800 |
| 2023 | Wesley Plaisier | 5–2 (l) | Matthew Edgar | €4,800 | €1,600 | €800 |
| 2024 | Corné Groeneveld | 5–2 (l) | (England) Cliff Prior | €5,600 | €1,600 | €800 |
| 2025 | Jimmy van Schie | 5–4 (l) | Matt Clark | €5,600 | €1,600 | €800 |

=== Women's ===
| Year | Winner | Score | Runner-up |
|---|---|---|---|
| 1988 | (England) Sharon Colclough | | (Belgium) Catherine Neyrinck |
| 1989 | (Belgium) Rita Lagace | | (Belgium) Vicky Pruim |
| 1990 | (England) Sharon Colclough | | (England) Deta Hedman |
| 1991 | (England) Lynn Ormond | | (England) Deta Hedman |
| 1992 | (England) Lynn Ormond | | (Netherlands) Francis Hoenselaar |
| 1993 | (England) Deta Hedman | | (Belgium) Maria Dekeyser |
| 1994 | (Netherlands) Francis Hoenselaar | | (Netherlands) Kitty van der Vliet |
| 1995 | (Netherlands) Francis Hoenselaar | | (Germany) Heike Ernst |
| 1996 | (Netherlands) Francis Hoenselaar | | (England) Mandy Solomons |
| 1997 | (England) Mandy Solomons | | (Netherlands) Francis Hoenselaar |
| 1998 | (Belgium) Sandra Pollet | | (Netherlands) Valerie Maytum |
| 1999 | (Netherlands) Francis Hoenselaar | | (England) Sharon Colclough |
| 2000 | (Netherlands) Karin Krappen | | (Netherlands) Francis Hoenselaar |
| 2001 | (Netherlands) Francis Hoenselaar | | (Belgium) Vicky Pruim |
| 2002 | (Netherlands) Francis Hoenselaar | | (England) Tricia Wright |
| 2003 | (Netherlands) Francis Hoenselaar | | (England) Deta Hedman |
| 2004 | (Netherlands) Francis Hoenselaar | | (England) Crissy Howat |
| 2005 | (Netherlands) Rilana Erades | | (England) Sally Smith |
| 2006 | (Netherlands) Francis Hoenselaar | 2 – 0 | (Belgium) Sandra Pollet |
| 2007 | (Netherlands) Francis Hoenselaar | | (Netherlands) Carla Molema |
| 2008 | (Netherlands) Rilana Erades | | (Belgium) Patricia De Peuter |
| 2009 | (Netherlands) Carla Molema | 2 – 1 | (Russia) Irina Armstrong |
| 2010 | (England) Deta Hedman | 2 – 0 | (Netherlands) Karin Krappen |
| 2011 | (Netherlands) Francis Hoenselaar | 2 – 1 | (Russia) Anastasia Dobromyslova |
| 2012 | (Russia) Anastasia Dobromyslova | 2 – 0 | (Norway) Rachna David |
| 2013 | (England) Zoe Jones | 2 – 1 | (England) Deta Hedman |
| 2014 | (Russia) Anastasia Dobromyslova | 2 – 0 | (England) Deta Hedman |
| 2015 | (England) Deta Hedman | 2 – 0 | (Netherlands) Sharon Prins |
| 2016 | (England) Lisa Ashton | 2 – 0 | (Russia) Anastasia Dobromyslova |
| 2017 | (England) Deta Hedman | 7 – 1 | (England) Casey Gallagher |
| 2018 | (England) Casey Gallagher | 6 – 3 | (England) Tricia Wright |
| 2019 | Astrid Trouwborst | 6 – 3 | (Netherlands) Sharon Prins |
| 2022 | Aletta Wajer | 6 – 3 | Laura Turner |
| 2023 | (England) Deta Hedman | 5 – 4 | (Germany) Monique Lessmeister |
| 2024 | Lerena Rietbergen | 5 – 1 | Priscilla Steenbergen |
| 2025 | Lisa Zollikofer | 5 – 3 | Emine Dursun |

== Tournament records ==
- Most wins 3: (England) Colin Lloyd, (England) Terry Jenkins.
- Most Finals 4: (England) Colin Lloyd.
- Most Semi Finals 4: (England) Colin Lloyd.
- Most Quarter Finals 4: (England) Scott Mitchell.
- Most Appearances 6: (England) Alan Warriner-Little, (England) Dennis Smith.
- Most Prize Money won €4894: (England) Terry Jenkins.
- Best winning average () : v.
- Youngest Winner age 22: (United States) Steve Brown.
- Oldest Winner age 57: (England) Martin Adams.
