= 2006 WDF Europe Cup =

Tournament information
- Venue: Lynch West County Hotel
- Location: Ennis
- Country: (Republic of Ireland) Ireland
- Established: 21–23 Sep
- Organisation(s): WDF
- Format: Legs

Champion(s)
- Singles (Wales) Mark Webster (men's singles); Trina Gulliver (women's singles); Pairs (Scotland) Paul Hanvidge & Paul McGimpsey (men's pairs) (England) Trina Gulliver & Clare Bywaters (women's pairs); Team; Netherlands (men's team); Overall; Netherlands (men's overall); England (women's overall)

The 2006 WDF Europe Cup was the 15th edition of the WDF Europe Cup darts tournament, organised by the World Darts Federation. It was held in Ennis, Ireland from 21–23 August.

== Entered teams ==
19 countries/associations entered a men's selection in the event.

20 countries/associations entered a women's selection in the event.

Nr.	Country	Men's Selection
1	Belgium	Kurt Delahousse, Chris Braekevelt, Geert De Vos, Dirk Hespeels
2	Czech Republic	Pavel Drtíl, Petr Tous, David Miklas, Miloslav Navrátil
3	Denmark	Per Laursen, Brian Buur, Peter Sonderby, Anders Pedersen
4	England	Tony O'Shea, Shaun Greatbatch, Steve Farmer, Martin Adams
5	Finland	Jarkko Komula, Marko Kantele, Ulf Ceder, Vesa Nuutinen
6	France	Christophe Gayral, Michael Leclercq, Michel Boulet, Cyril Blot
7	Germany	Andreas Krockel, Colin Rice, Marko Puls, Karsten Wieggrebe
8	Gibraltar	Dyson Parody, Dylan Duo, Justin Broton, Henry Zapata
9	Hungary	Bela Balogh, Attila Boszok, Nándor Bezzeg, Levente Szekely
10	Iceland	Thorgeir Gudmundson, Magnus Gardarsson, Aegir Bjornsson, Throsdur Ingimarsson
11	Ireland	Benny Grace, Garrett Gray, Aodhagan O'Neill, Anto McCracken
12	Italy	Marco Apollonio, Stefano Zanone, Luigi Marino, Loris Polese
13	Netherlands	Jelle Klaasen, Vincent van der Voort, Co Stompé, Niels de Ruiter
14	Northern Ireland	Paul Watton, Brian Cathcart, John Elder, Michael Blair
15	Norway	Ken-Rune Jorgensen, Øyvind Aasland, Robert Wagner, Rune David
16	Russia	Roman Konchikov, Stanislav Megerya, Lev Kuzmichev, Andrei Ratnikov
17	Scotland	Paul McGimpsey, Paul Hanvidge, Gary Anderson, Mike Veitch
18	Sweden	Kenneth Hogvall, Johan Engström, Göran Klemme, Daniel Larsson
19	Turkey	Ayhan Turali, Bora Temizsoy, Emre Toros, Ercument Akyollu
20	Wales	Robert Hughes, Mark Webster, Wayne Warren, Martin Phillips

Nr.	Country	Woman's Selection
1	Belgium	Rita De Schrijver & Wendy Beutels
2	Czech Republic	Lenka Schediva & Zuzana Stepanova
3	Denmark	Janni Larsen & Tina Eggersen
4	England	Trina Gulliver & Clare Bywaters
5	Finland	Sari Nikula & Tarja Salminen
6	France	Josette Kerdraon & Valere Gaudion
7	Germany	Bianka Strauch & Sabrina Spörle
8	Hungary	Nora Fekete & Zsofia Lazar
9	Iceland	Asta Lundbergsdottir & Sigridur-Gudrun Jonsdottir
10	Ireland	Angela De Ward & Maureen Kelly
11	Italy	Giada Ciofi & Natalia Farinati
12	Netherlands	Karin Krappen & Francis Hoenselaar
13	Northern Ireland	Dorothy Anderson & Denise Cassidy
14	Norway	Hege Løkken & Mette Engen-Hansen
15	Russia	Irina Armstrong & Anastasia Dobromyslova
16	Scotland	Anne Kirk & Louise Hepburn
17	Sweden	Maud Jansson & Carina Ekberg
18	Turkey	Meltem Giray & Neslihan Algul-Diniz
19	Wales	Jan Robbins & Julie Gore

== Men's singles ==
1st Round (best of 7 legs)
(Netherlands) Jelle Klaasen	4
(Gibraltar) Dylan Duo	0
(Republic of Ireland) Brendan Grace	2
(Sweden) Kenneth Hogvall	4
(Denmark) Anders Pedersen
Bye
(Finland) Ulf Ceder
Bye
(Wales) Mark Webster
Bye
(Russia) Stanislav Megerya
Bye
(Belgium) Geert De Vos
Bye
(Germany) Marko Puls
Bye
(Italy) Stefano Zanone
Bye
(Norway) Øyvind Aasland	4
(Iceland) Throsdur Ingimarsson	1
(Scotland) Paul Hanvidge
Bye
(Turkey) Ercument Akyollu
Bye
(Hungary) Nándor Bezzeg
Bye
(France) Cyril Blot	4
(Gibraltar) Dyson Parody	0
(Northern Ireland) Paul Watton	4
(Czech Republic) Pavel Drtil	0
(England) Martin Adams	4
(Gibraltar) Henry Zapata	0
(Denmark) Brian Buur	4
(Gibraltar) Justin Broton	2
(Wales) Robert Hughes	4
(Turkey) Bora Temizsoy	1
(Italy) Loris Polese
Bye
(Republic of Ireland) Garrett Gray
Bye
(Norway) Ken-Rune Jorgensen
Bye
(Scotland) Mike Veitch
Bye
(Czech Republic) Miloslav Navrátil
Bye
(England) Steve Farmer	4
(Hungary) Bela Balogh	3
(France) Michel Boulet	4
(Belgium) Kurt Delahousse	2
(Finland) Marko Kantele
Bye
(Netherlands) Co Stompé
Bye
(Germany) Karsten Wieggrebe
Bye
(Russia) Andrei Ratnikov
Bye
(Iceland) Magnus Gardarsson
Bye
(Northern Ireland) Brian Cathcart
Bye
(Sweden) Göran Klemme
Bye
(Finland) Jarkko Komula
Bye
(Russia) Lev Kuzmichev	4
(France) Christophe Gayral	0
(Scotland) Paul McGimpsey	4
(Germany) Andreas Kröckel	2
(Wales) Martin Phillips
Bye
(Italy) Marco Apollonio	2
(Denmark) Per Laursen	4
(Norway) Rune David
Bye
(Northern Ireland) John Elder
Bye
(Netherlands) Vincent van der Voort
Bye
(Republic of Ireland) Anto McCracken
Bye
(England) Tony O'Shea
Bye
(Hungary) Attila Boszok
Bye
(Iceland) Aegir Bjornsson
Bye
(Czech Republic) David Miklas
Bye
(Sweden) Daniel Larsson
Bye
(Turkey) Ayhan Turali
Bye
(Belgium) Chris Braekevelt
Bye
(Norway) Robert Wagner
Bye
(Finland) Vesa Nuutinen	4
(Czech Republic) Petr Tous	2
(Scotland) Gary Anderson
Bye
(France) Michael Leclercq
Bye
(Denmark) Peter Sonderby
Bye
(Sweden) Johan Engström
Bye
(Germany) Colin Rice
Bye
(Italy) Luigi Marino
Bye
(Belgium) Dirk Hespeels
Bye
(Netherlands) Niels de Ruiter	4
(Hungary) Levente Szekely	3
(Northern Ireland) Michael Blair
Bye
(Russia) Roman Konchikov
Bye
(England) Shaun Greatbatch
Bye
(Iceland) Thorgeir Gudmundson	4
(Wales) Wayne Warren	2
(Turkey) Emre Toros
Bye
(Republic of Ireland) Aodhagan O'Neill
Bye

2nd Round (best of 7 legs)
(Netherlands) Jelle Klaasen	4
(Sweden) Kenneth Hogvall	1
(Denmark) Anders Pedersen	1
(Finland) Ulf Ceder	4
(Wales) Mark Webster	4
(Russia) Stanislav Megerya	1
(Belgium) Geert De Vos	4
(Germany) Marko Puls	3
(Italy) Stefano Zanone	1
(Norway) Øyvind Aasland	4
(Scotland) Paul Hanvidge	4
(Turkey) Ercument Akyollu	0
(Hungary) Nándor Bezzeg	2
(France) Cyril Blot	4
(Northern Ireland) Paul Watton	4
(England) Martin Adams	1
(Denmark) Brian Buur	3
(Wales) Robert Hughes	4
(Italy) Loris Polese	4
(Republic of Ireland) Garrett Gray	2
(Norway) Ken-Rune Jorgensen	3
(Scotland) Mike Veitch	4
(Czech Republic) Miloslav Navrátil	0
(England) Steve Farmer	4
(France) Michel Boulet	1
(Finland) Marko Kantele	4
(Netherlands) Co Stompé	4
(Germany) Karsten Wieggrebe	1
(Russia) Andrei Ratnikov	4
(Iceland) Magnus Gardarsson	2
(Northern Ireland) Brian Cathcart	0
(Sweden) Göran Klemme	4
(Finland) Jarkko Komula	4
(Russia) Lev Kuzmichev	0
(Scotland) Paul McGimpsey	1
(Wales) Martin Phillips	4
(Denmark) Per Laursen	4
(Norway) Rune David	2
(Northern Ireland) John Elder	4
(Netherlands) Vincent van der Voort	1
(Republic of Ireland) Anto McCracken	2
(England) Tony O'Shea	4
(Hungary) Attila Boszok	3
(Iceland) Aegir Bjornsson	4
(Czech Republic) David Miklas	1
(Sweden) Daniel Larsson	4
(Turkey) Ayhan Turali	1
(Belgium) Chris Braekevelt	4
(Norway) Robert Wagner	4
(Finland) Vesa Nuutinen	2
(Scotland) Gary Anderson	4
(France) Michael Leclercq	0
(Denmark) Peter Sonderby	4
(Sweden) Johan Engström	1
(Germany) Colin Rice	0
(Italy) Luigi Marino	4
(Belgium) Dirk Hespeels	1
(Netherlands) Niels de Ruiter	4
(Northern Ireland) Michael Blair	4
(Russia) Roman Konchikov	0
(England) Shaun Greatbatch	4
(Iceland) Thorgeir Gudmundson	3
(Turkey) Emre Toros	3
(Republic of Ireland) Aodhagan O'Neill	4

3rd Round (best of 7 legs)
(Netherlands) Jelle Klaasen	2
(Finland) Ulf Ceder	4
(Wales) Mark Webster	4
(Belgium) Geert De Vos	1
(Norway) Øyvind Aasland	0
(Scotland) Paul Hanvidge	4
(France) Cyril Blot	1
(Northern Ireland) Paul Watton	4
(Wales) Robert Hughes	4
(Italy) Loris Polese	0
(Scotland) Mike Veitch	1
(England) Steve Farmer	4
(Finland) Marko Kantele	1
(Netherlands) Co Stompé	4
(Russia) Andrei Ratnikov	1
(Sweden) Göran Klemme	4
(Finland) Jarkko Komula	3
(Wales) Martin Phillips	4
(Denmark) Per Laursen	2
(Northern Ireland) John Elder	4
(England) Tony O'Shea	4
(Iceland) Aegir Bjornsson	0
(Sweden) Daniel Larsson	4
(Belgium) Chris Braekevelt	0
(Norway) Robert Wagner	2
(Scotland) Gary Anderson	4
(Denmark) Peter Sonderby	4
(Italy) Luigi Marino	2
(Netherlands) Niels de Ruiter	4
(Northern Ireland) Michael Blair	2
(England) Shaun Greatbatch	1
(Republic of Ireland) Aodhagan O'Neill	4

4th Round (best of 7 legs)
(Finland) Ulf Ceder	2
(Wales) Mark Webster	4
(Scotland) Paul Hanvidge	4
(Northern Ireland) Paul Watton	3
(Wales) Robert Hughes	4
(England) Steve Farmer	2
(Netherlands) Co Stompé	2
(Sweden) Göran Klemme	4
(Wales) Martin Phillips	4
(Northern Ireland) John Elder	1
(England) Tony O'Shea	3
(Sweden) Daniel Larsson	4
(Scotland) Gary Anderson	4
(Denmark) Peter Sonderby	2
(Netherlands) Niels de Ruiter	4
(Republic of Ireland) Aodhagan O'Neill	2

Quarter-finals (best of 7 legs)
(Wales) Mark Webster	4
(Scotland) Paul Hanvidge	3
(Wales) Robert Hughes	2
(Sweden) Göran Klemme	4
(Wales) Martin Phillips	3
(Sweden) Daniel Larsson	4
(Scotland) Gary Anderson	2
(Netherlands) Niels de Ruiter	4

Semi-finals (best of 7 legs)
(Wales) Mark Webster	4
(Sweden) Göran Klemme	2
Final (best of 7 legs)
(Wales) Mark Webster	4
(Netherlands) Niels de Ruiter	3
(Sweden) Daniel Larsson	2
(Netherlands) Niels de Ruiter	4

== Men's Pairs ==
1st Round (best of 7 legs)
(Netherlands) Jelle Klaasen (Netherlands) Vincent van der Voort	4
(Gibraltar) Dylan Duo (Gibraltar) Henry Zapata	0
(Wales) Mark Webster (Wales) Robert Hughes	2
(Denmark) Brian Buur (Denmark) Per Laursen	4
(Scotland) Gary Anderson (Scotland) Mike Veitch
Bye
(Belgium) Chris Braekevelt (Belgium) Kurt Delahousse
Bye
(Hungary) Levente Szekely (Hungary) Nándor Bezzeg
Bye
(Czech Republic) David Miklas (Czech Republic) Petr Tous
Bye
(Northern Ireland) Brian Cathcart (Northern Ireland) Michael Blair	2
(Russia) Lev Kuzmichev (Russia) Stanislav Megerya	4
(Norway) Robert Wagner (Norway) Øyvind Aasland
Bye
(Sweden) Göran Klemme (Sweden) Johan Engström
Bye
(Italy) Stefano Zanone (Italy) Marco Apollonio
Bye
(Turkey) Emre Toros (Turkey) Ayhan Turali
Bye
(France) Christophe Gayral (France) Michael Leclercq	4
(Hungary) Bela Balogh (Hungary) Attila Boszok	2
(Republic of Ireland) Brendan Grace (Republic of Ireland) Aodhagan O'Neill	4
(Gibraltar) Dyson Parody (Gibraltar) Justin Broton
(Iceland) Throsdur Ingimarsson (Iceland) Aegir Bjornsson
Bye
(England) Shaun Greatbatch (England) Steve Farmer
Bye
(Finland) Marko Kantele (Finland) Jarkko Komula
Bye
(England) Martin Adams (England) Tony O'Shea
Bye
(Finland) Ulf Ceder (Finland) Vesa Nuutinen	4
(Belgium) Dirk Hespeels (Belgium) Geert De Vos	3
(Czech Republic) Miloslav Navrátil (Czech Republic) Pavel Dritl
Bye
(Germany) Marko Puls (Germany) Karsten Wieggrebe
Bye
(Northern Ireland) Paul Watton (Northern Ireland) John Elder
Bye
(Italy) Loris Polese (Italy) Luigi Marino	4
(Turkey) Bora Temizsoy (Turkey) Ercument Akyollu	0
(Norway) Ken-Rune Jorgensen (Norway) Rune David
Bye
(France) Michel Boulet (France) Cyril Blot
Bye
(Wales) Wayne Warren (Wales) Martin Phillips
Bye
(Russia) Andrei Ratnikov (Russia) Roman Konchikov
Bye
(Iceland) Magnus Gardarsson (Iceland) Thorgeir Gudmundsson
Bye
(Denmark) Anders Pedersen (Denmark) Peter Sonderby
Bye
(Sweden) Daniel Larsson (Sweden) Kenneth Hogvall	4
(Republic of Ireland) Anto McCracken (Republic of Ireland) Garrett Gray	1
(Germany) Andreas Kröckel (Germany) Colin Rice
Bye
(Netherlands) Niels de Ruiter (Netherlands) Co Stompé
Bye
(Scotland) Paul Hanvidge (Scotland) Paul McGimpsey
Bye

2nd Round (best of 7 legs)
(Netherlands) Jelle Klaasen (Netherlands) Vincent van der Voort	4
(Denmark) Brian Buur (Denmark) Per Laursen	3
(Scotland) Gary Anderson (Scotland) Mike Veitch	3
(Belgium) Chris Braekevelt (Belgium) Kurt Delahousse	4
(Hungary) Levente Szekely (Hungary) Nándor Bezzeg	4
(Czech Republic) David Miklas (Czech Republic) Petr Tous	2
(Russia) Lev Kuzmichev (Russia) Stanislav Megerya	1
(Norway) Robert Wagner (Norway) Øyvind Aasland	4
(Sweden) Göran Klemme (Sweden) Johan Engström	4
(Italy) Stefano Zanone (Italy) Marco Apollonio	2
(Turkey) Emre Toros (Turkey) Ayhan Turali	4
(France) Christophe Gayral (France) Michael Leclercq	2
(Republic of Ireland) Brendan Grace (Republic of Ireland) Aodhagan O'Neill	4
(Iceland) Throsdur Ingimarsson (Iceland) Aegir Bjornsson	2
(England) Shaun Greatbatch (England) Steve Farmer	3
(Finland) Marko Kantele (Finland) Jarkko Komula	4
(England) Martin Adams (England) Tony O'Shea	3
(Finland) Ulf Ceder (Finland) Vesa Nuutinen	4
(Czech Republic) Miloslav Navrátil (Czech Republic) Pavel Dritl	4
(Germany) Marko Puls (Germany) Karsten Wieggrebe	0
(Northern Ireland) Paul Watton (Northern Ireland) John Elder	4
(Italy) Loris Polese (Italy) Luigi Marino	0
(Norway) Ken-Rune Jorgensen (Norway) Rune David	4
(France) Michel Boulet (France) Cyril Blot	1
(Wales) Wayne Warren (Wales) Martin Phillips	4
(Russia) Andrei Ratnikov (Russia) Roman Konchikov	0
(Iceland) Magnus Gardarsson (Iceland) Thorgeir Gudmundsson	3
(Denmark) Anders Pedersen (Denmark) Peter Sonderby	4
(Sweden) Daniel Larsson (Sweden) Kenneth Hogvall	4
(Germany) Andreas Kröckel (Germany) Colin Rice	0
(Netherlands) Niels de Ruiter (Netherlands) Co Stompé	1
(Scotland) Paul Hanvidge (Scotland) Paul McGimpsey	4

3rd Round (best of 7 legs)
(Netherlands) Jelle Klaasen (Netherlands) Vincent van der Voort	4
(Belgium) Chris Braekevelt (Belgium) Kurt Delahousse	1
(Hungary) Levente Szekely (Hungary) Nándor Bezzeg	1
(Norway) Robert Wagner (Norway) Øyvind Aasland	4
(Sweden) Göran Klemme (Sweden) Johan Engström	4
(Turkey) Emre Toros (Turkey) Ayhan Turali	0
(Republic of Ireland) Brendan Grace (Republic of Ireland) Aodhagan O'Neill	2
(Finland) Marko Kantele (Finland) Jarkko Komula	4
(Finland) Ulf Ceder (Finland) Vesa Nuutinen	4
(Czech Republic) Miloslav Navrátil (Czech Republic) Pavel Dritl	1
(Northern Ireland) Paul Watton (Northern Ireland) John Elder	4
(Norway) Ken-Rune Jorgensen (Norway) Rune David	0
(Wales) Wayne Warren (Wales) Martin Phillips	4
(Denmark) Anders Pedersen (Denmark) Peter Sonderby	2
(Sweden) Daniel Larsson (Sweden) Kenneth Hogvall	2
(Scotland) Paul Hanvidge (Scotland) Paul McGimpsey	4

Quarter-finals (best of 7 legs)
(Netherlands) Jelle Klaasen (Netherlands) Vincent van der Voort	4
(Norway) Robert Wagner (Norway) Øyvind Aasland	3
(Sweden) Göran Klemme (Sweden) Johan Engström	0
(Finland) Marko Kantele (Finland) Jarkko Komula	4
(Finland) Ulf Ceder (Finland) Vesa Nuutinen	3
(Northern Ireland) Paul Watton (Northern Ireland) John Elder	4
(Wales) Wayne Warren (Wales) Martin Phillips	3
(Scotland) Paul Hanvidge (Scotland) Paul McGimpsey	4

Semi-finals (best of 7 legs)
(Netherlands) Jelle Klaasen (Netherlands) Vincent van der Voort	1
(Finland) Marko Kantele (Finland) Jarkko Komula	4
(Northern Ireland) Paul Watton (Northern Ireland) John Elder	1
(Scotland) Paul Hanvidge (Scotland) Paul McGimpsey	4

Final (best of 7 legs)
(Finland) Marko Kantele (Finland) Jarkko Komula	0
(Scotland) Paul Hanvidge (Scotland) Paul McGimpsey	4

== Men's team ==
Round Robin

Group A

Pos	Team	Pld	Win	Lose	LF	LA	+/−
1	Northern Ireland	3	3	0	27	11	+16
2	England	3	2	1	23	18	+5
3	Belgium	3	1	2	16	26	−10
4	Iceland	3	0	3	13	27	−14

- Northern Ireland 9–5 England
- Northern Ireland 9–2 Belgium
- Northern Ireland 9–4 Iceland
- England 9–5 Belgium
- England 9–1 Iceland
- Belgium 9–8 Iceland

Group B

Pos	Team	Pld	Win	Lose	LF	LA	+/−
1	Netherlands	4	3	1	34	25	+9
2	Denmark	4	3	1	31	26	+5
3	Germany	4	2	2	31	30	+1
4	Wales	4	2	2	31	34	−3
5	Czech Republic	4	0	4	24	36	−12

- Netherlands 9–5 Denmark
- Netherlands 9–8 Wales
- Netherlands 9–4 Czech Republic
- Denmark 9–5 Germany
- Denmark 9–5 Wales
- Denmark 9–7 Czech Republic
- Germany 9–7 Netherlands
- Germany 9–5 Czech Republic
- Wales 9–8 Germany
- Wales 9–8 Czech Republic

Group C

Pos	Team	Pld	Win	Lose	LF	LA	+/−
1	Scotland	4	4	0	36	14	+24
2	Norway	4	3	1	34	23	+11
3	France	4	1	3	25	33	−8
4	Russia	4	1	3	23	33	−10
5	Italy	4	1	3	20	35	−15

- Scotland 9–7 Norway
- Scotland 9–3 France
- Scotland 9–3 Russia
- Scotland 9–1 Italy
- Norway 9–5 France
- Norway 9–5 Russia
- Norway 9–4 Italy
- France 9–6 Russia
- Russia 9–6 Italy
- Italy 9–8 France

Group D

Pos	Team	Pld	Win	Lose	LF	LA	+/−
1	Sweden	4	4	0	36	8	+28
2	Finland	4	3	1	31	13	+18
3	(Republic of Ireland) Ireland	4	2	2	22	26	−4
4	Hungary	4	1	3	15	33	−18
5	Turkey	4	0	4	12	36	−24

- Sweden 9–4 Finland
- Sweden 9–2 (Republic of Ireland) Ireland
- Sweden 9–1 Hungary
- Sweden 9–1 Turkey
- Finland 9–2 (Republic of Ireland) Ireland
- Finland 9–0 Hungary
- Finland 9–2 Turkey
- (Republic of Ireland) Ireland 9–5 Hungary
- (Republic of Ireland) Ireland 9–3 Turkey
- Hungary 9–6 Turkey

Knock Out

Quarter-finals (best of 17 legs)
A1	Northern Ireland	9
D2	Finland	8
B1	Netherlands	9
C2	Norway	6
C1	Scotland	9
B2	Denmark	6
D1	Sweden	4
A2	England	9

Semi-finals (best of 17 legs)
A1	Northern Ireland	5
B1	Netherlands	9
C1	Scotland	8
A2	England	9

Final (best of 17 legs)
A1	Netherlands	9
C1	Scotland	2

== Woman's singles ==
1st Round (best of 7 legs)
(Netherlands) Francis Hoenselaar
Bye
(Italy) Natalia Farinati	W
(Republic of Ireland) Maureen Kelly	O
(Czech Republic) Lenka Schediva
Bye
(Norway) Mette Engen-Hansen
Bye
(France) Valere Gaudion
Bye
(Sweden) Maud Jansson
Bye
(England) Trina Gulliver
Bye
(Russia) Anastasia Dobromyslova
Bye
(Wales) Julie Gore
Bye
(Iceland) Sigridur-Gudrun Jonsdottir
Bye
(Denmark) Tina Eggersen	4
(Turkey) Neslihan Algul-Diniz	3
(Hungary) Zsofia Lazar
Bye
(Northern Ireland) Dorothy Anderson
Bye
(Belgium) Rita De Schrijver
Bye
(Scotland) Louise Hepburn	3
(Finland) Sari Nikula	4
(Germany) Bianka Strauch
Bye
(England) Clare Bywaters
Bye
(Iceland) Asta Lundbergsdottir	2
(Czech Republic) Zuzana Stepanova	4
(Germany) Sabrina Spörle
Bye
(Russia) Irina Armstrong
Bye
(France) Josette Kerdraon	2
(Hungary) Nora Fekete	4
(Italy) Giada Ciofi
Bye
(Northern Ireland) Denise Cassidy
Bye
(Finland) Tarja Salminen
Bye
(Scotland) Anne Kirk
Bye
(Belgium) Wendy Beutels
Bye
(Turkey) Meltem Giray
Bye
(Norway) Hege Løkken
Bye
(Wales) Jan Robbins	4
(Netherlands) Karin Krappen	2
(Sweden) Carina Ekberg
Bye
(Denmark) Janni Larsen
Bye
(Republic of Ireland) Angela De Ward
Bye

2nd Round (best of 7 legs)
(Netherlands) Francis Hoenselaar	4
(Italy) Natalia Farinati	0
(Czech Republic) Lenka Schediva	3
(Norway) Mette Engen-Hansen	4
(France) Valere Gaudion	2
(Sweden) Maud Jansson	4
(England) Trina Gulliver	4
(Russia) Anastasia Dobromyslova	1
(Wales) Julie Gore	4
(Iceland) Sigridur-Gudrun Jonsdottir	1
(Denmark) Tina Eggersen	4
(Hungary) Zsofia Lazar	2
(Northern Ireland) Dorothy Anderson	4
(Belgium) Rita De Schrijver	3
(Finland) Sari Nikula	3
(Germany) Bianka Strauch	4
(England) Clare Bywaters	4
(Czech Republic) Zuzana Stepanova	0
(Germany) Sabrina Spörle	4
(Russia) Irina Armstrong	3
(Hungary) Nora Fekete	4
(Italy) Giada Ciofi	1
(Northern Ireland) Denise Cassidy	4
(Finland) Tarja Salminen	3
(Scotland) Anne Kirk	4
(Belgium) Wendy Beutels	1
(Turkey) Meltem Giray	4
(Norway) Hege Løkken	3
(Wales) Jan Robbins	4
(Sweden) Carina Ekberg	2
(Denmark) Janni Larsen	3
(Republic of Ireland) Angela De Ward	4

3rd Round (best of 7 legs)
(Netherlands) Francis Hoenselaar	4
(Norway) Mette Engen-Hansen	2
(Sweden) Maud Jansson	2
(England) Trina Gulliver	4
(Wales) Julie Gore	4
(Denmark) Tina Eggersen	1
(Northern Ireland) Dorothy Anderson	0
(Germany) Bianka Strauch	4
(England) Clare Bywaters	4
(Germany) Sabrina Spörle	1
(Hungary) Nora Fekete	3
(Northern Ireland) Denise Cassidy	4
(Scotland) Anne Kirk	4
(Turkey) Meltem Giray	1
(Wales) Jan Robbins	4
(Republic of Ireland) Angela De Ward	1

Quarter-finals (best of 7 legs)
(Netherlands) Francis Hoenselaar	3
(England) Trina Gulliver	4
(Wales) Julie Gore	4
(Germany) Bianka Strauch	2
(England) Clare Bywaters	4
(Northern Ireland) Denise Cassidy	3
(Scotland) Anne Kirk	4
(Wales) Jan Robbins	3

Semi-finals (best of 7 legs)
(England) Trina Gulliver	4
(Wales) Julie Gore	3
(England) Trina Gulliver	4
(Scotland) Anne Kirk	2

Final (best of 7 legs)
(England) Trina Gulliver	4
(England) Clare Bywaters	2

== Woman's Pairs ==
Round Robin

Group A

Pos	Team	Pld	Win	Lose	LF	LA	+/−
1	(England) Trina Gulliver (England) Clare Bywaters	4	4	0	16	2	+14
2	(Norway) Hege Løkken (Norway) Mette Engen-Hansen	4	2	2	11	11	0
3	(Czech Republic) Lenka Schediva (Czech Republic) Zuzana Stepanova	4	2	2	9	10	−1
4	(Belgium) Rita De Schrijver (Belgium) Wendy Beutels	4	1	3	8	13	−5
5	(Denmark) Janni Larsen (Denmark) Tina Eggersen	4	1	3	6	14	−8

- (England) Trina Gulliver & Clare Bywaters 4–1 (Norway) Hege Løkken & Mette Engen-Hansen
- (England) Trina Gulliver & Clare Bywaters 4–0 (Czech Republic) Lenka Schediva & Zuzana Stepanova
- (England) Trina Gulliver & Clare Bywaters 4–0 (Belgium) Rita De Schrijver & Wendy Beutels
- (England) Trina Gulliver & Clare Bywaters 4–1 (Denmark) Janni Larsen & Tina Eggersen
- (Norway) Hege Løkken & Mette Engen-Hansen 4–2 (Belgium) Rita De Schrijver & Wendy Beutels
- (Norway) Hege Løkken & Mette Engen-Hansen 4–1 (Denmark) Janni Larsen & Tina Eggersen
- (Czech Republic) Lenka Schediva & Zuzana Stepanova 4–2 (Norway) Hege Løkken & Mette Engen-Hansen
- (Czech Republic) Lenka Schediva & Zuzana Stepanova 4–0 (Denmark) Janni Larsen & Tina Eggersen
- (Belgium) Rita De Schrijver & Wendy Beutels 4–1 (Czech Republic) Lenka Schediva & Zuzana Stepanova
- (Denmark) Janni Larsen & Tina Eggersen 4–2 (Belgium) Rita De Schrijver & Wendy Beutels

Group B

Pos	Team	Pld	Win	Lose	LF	LA	+/−
1	(Wales) Jan Robbins (Wales) Julie Gore	4	4	0	16	3	+13
2	(Republic of Ireland) Angela De Ward (Republic of Ireland) Maureen Kelly	4	3	1	13	9	+4
3	(France) Josette Kerdraon (France) Valere Gaudion	4	2	2	10	11	−1
4	(Russia) Irina Armstrong (Russia) Anastasia Dobromyslova	4	1	3	10	12	−2
5	(Iceland) Asta Lundbergsdottir (Iceland) Sigridur-Gudrun Jonsdottir	4	0	4	2	16	−14

- (Wales) Jan Robbins & Julie Gore 4–1 (Republic of Ireland) Angela De Ward & Maureen Kelly
- (Wales) Jan Robbins & Julie Gore 4–0 (France) Josette Kerdraon & Valere Gaudion
- (Wales) Jan Robbins & Julie Gore 4–2 (Russia) Irina Armstrong & Anastasia Dobromyslova
- (Wales) Jan Robbins & Julie Gore 4–0 (Iceland) Asta Lundbergsdottir & Sigridur-Gudrun Jonsdottir
- (Republic of Ireland) Angela De Ward & Maureen Kelly 4–2 (France) Josette Kerdraon & Valere Gaudion
- (Republic of Ireland) Angela De Ward & Maureen Kelly 4–1 (Russia) Irina Armstrong & Anastasia Dobromyslova
- (Republic of Ireland) Angela De Ward & Maureen Kelly 4–2 (Iceland) Asta Lundbergsdottir & Sigridur-Gudrun Jonsdottir
- (France) Josette Kerdraon & Valere Gaudion 4–3 (Russia) Irina Armstrong & Anastasia Dobromyslova
- (France) Josette Kerdraon & Valere Gaudion 4–0 (Iceland) Asta Lundbergsdottir & Sigridur-Gudrun Jonsdottir
- (Russia) Irina Armstrong & Anastasia Dobromyslova 4–0 (Iceland) Asta Lundbergsdottir & Sigridur-Gudrun Jonsdottir

Group C

Pos	Team	Pld	Win	Lose	LF	LA	+/−
1	(Netherlands) Karin Krappen (Netherlands) Francis Hoenselaar	4	4	0	16	5	+11
2	(Finland) Sari Nikula (Finland) Tarja Salminen	4	3	1	13	9	+4
3	(Sweden) Maud Jansson (Sweden) Carina Ekberg	4	2	2	11	11	0
4	(Germany) Bianka Strauch (Germany) Sabrina Spörle	4	1	3	12	15	-3
5	(Hungary) Nora Fekete (Hungary) Zsofia Lazar	4	0	4	4	16	-12

- (Netherlands) Karin Krappen & Francis Hoenselaar 4–1 (Finland) Sari Nikula & Tarja Salminen
- (Netherlands) Karin Krappen & Francis Hoenselaar 4–2 (Sweden) Maud Jansson & Carina Ekberg
- (Netherlands) Karin Krappen & Francis Hoenselaar 4–2 (Germany) Bianka Strauch & Sabrina Spörle
- (Netherlands) Karin Krappen & Francis Hoenselaar 4–0 (Hungary) Nora Fekete & Zsofia Lazar
- (Finland) Sari Nikula & Tarja Salminen 4–1 (Sweden) Maud Jansson & Carina Ekberg
- (Finland) Sari Nikula & Tarja Salminen 4–3 (Germany) Bianka Strauch & Sabrina Spörle
- (Finland) Sari Nikula & Tarja Salminen 4–1 (Hungary) Nora Fekete & Zsofia Lazar
- (Sweden) Maud Jansson & Carina Ekberg 4–3 (Germany) Bianka Strauch & Sabrina Spörle
- (Sweden) Maud Jansson & Carina Ekberg 4–0 (Hungary) Nora Fekete & Zsofia Lazar
- (Germany) Bianka Strauch & Sabrina Spörle 4–3 (Hungary) Nora Fekete & Zsofia Lazar

Group D

Pos	Team	Pld	Win	Lose	LF	LA	+/−
1	(Scotland) Anne Kirk (Scotland) Louise Hepburn	3	3	0	12	2	+10
2	(Northern Ireland) Dorothy Anderson (Northern Ireland) Denise Cassidy	3	2	1	8	6	+2
3	(Italy) Giada Ciofi (Italy) Natalia Farinati	3	1	2	7	10	−3
4	(Turkey) Meltem Giray (Turkey) Neslihan Algul-Diniz	3	0	3	3	12	−9

- (Scotland) Anne Kirk & Louise Hepburn 4–0 (Northern Ireland) Dorothy Anderson & Denise Cassidy
- (Scotland) Anne Kirk & Louise Hepburn 4–1 (Italy) Giada Ciofi & Natalia Farinati
- (Scotland) Anne Kirk & Louise Hepburn 4–1 (Turkey) Meltem Giray & Neslihan Algul-Diniz
- (Northern Ireland) Dorothy Anderson & Denise Cassidy 4–2 (Italy) Giada Ciofi & Natalia Farinati
- (Northern Ireland) Dorothy Anderson & Denise Cassidy 4–0 (Turkey) Meltem Giray & Neslihan Algul-Diniz
- (Italy) Giada Ciofi & Natalia Farinati 4–2 (Turkey) Meltem Giray & Neslihan Algul-Diniz

Knock Out

Quarter-finals (best of 7 legs)
A1	(England) Trina Gulliver (England) Clare Bywaters	4
D2	(Northern Ireland) Dorothy Anderson (Northern Ireland) Denise Cassidy	2
B1	(Wales) Jan Robbins (Wales) Julie Gore	4
C2	(Finland) Sari Nikula (Finland) Tarja Salminen	1
C1	(Netherlands) Karin Krappen (Netherlands) Francis Hoenselaar	4
A2	(Republic of Ireland) Angela De Ward (Republic of Ireland) Maureen Kelly	1
D1	(Scotland) Anne Kirk (Scotland) Louise Hepburn	4
B2	(Norway) Hege Løkken (Norway) Mette Engen-Hansen	3

Semi-finals (best of 7 legs)
A1	(England) Trina Gulliver (England) Clare Bywaters	4
B1	(Wales) Jan Robbins (Wales) Julie Gore	0
C1	(Netherlands) Karin Krappen (Netherlands) Francis Hoenselaar	2
D1	(Scotland) Anne Kirk (Scotland) Louise Hepburn	4

Final (best of 7 legs)
A1	(England) Trina Gulliver (England) Clare Bywaters	4
D1	(Scotland) Anne Kirk (Scotland) Louise Hepburn	3
