= 2007 BDO World Darts Championship =

Tournament information
- Dates: 6–14 January 2007
- Venue: Lakeside Country Club
- Location: Frimley Green, Surrey
- Country: England, United Kingdom
- Organisation(s): BDO
- Format: Sets; Finals: best of 13 (men's) best of 3 (women's)
- Prize fund: £278,000
- Winner's share: £70,000 (men's) £6,000 (women's)
- High checkout: 170 (England) Ted Hankey

Champion(s)
- (England) Martin Adams (England) Trina Gulliver

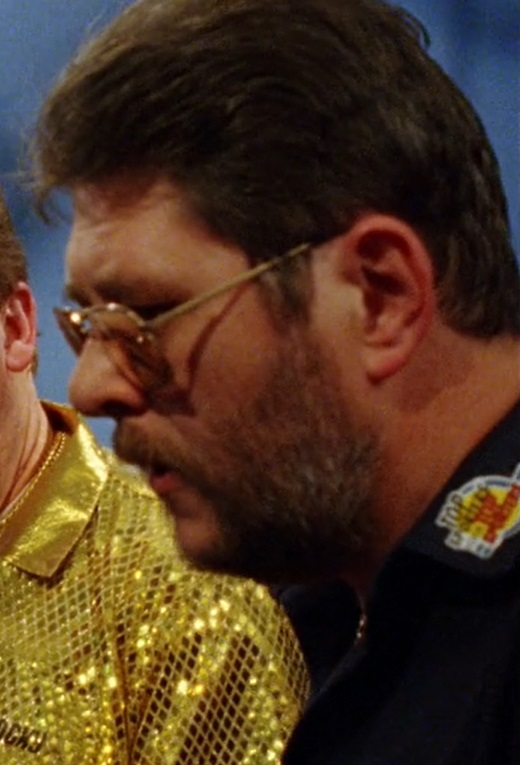
2007 BDO World Darts Champion - Martin Adams

The 2007 BDO World Darts Championship (known for sponsorship reasons as the 2007 Lakeside World Professional Darts Championship) was the 30th World Championship organised by the British Darts Organisation (BDO), and the 22nd to be held at the Lakeside Country Club, Frimley Green, Surrey. It ran from 6–14 January 2007.

Ahead of the tournament, the BDO announced a new stage set and player walk-on area. The markers – the two officials who manually calculated player scores – were replaced by on-stage plasma television screens. Thus, the only official on stage was the referee/caller.

The defending champion, Jelle Klaasen, who was unseeded after a poor season, lost in straight sets in the first round to fellow Dutchman Co Stompé. This was the first tournament since 1994 without four-time winner Raymond van Barneveld, who had switched to the rival Professional Darts Corporation soon after losing to Klaasen in the previous year's BDO final, the first time that a finalist from one World Championship had played in the other World Championship the following year, in direct contravention of the 1997 Tomlin Order. The day after the final, Klaasen himself also defected to the PDC, along with two other Dutch players, Michael van Gerwen and Vincent van der Voort (both of whom had also lost in the first round).

Martin Adams, the number 1 seed and long known as the nearly man at the World Championships, as the 2005 losing finalist and a three-time beaten semi-finalist, won the title. Phill Nixon, an unfancied qualifier and 150–1 outsider, also progressed to the final. Adams led 6–0 in the best-of-13-sets final, only for Nixon to mount a comeback and level the match at 6–6, before Adams finally won the deciding set.

In the women's tournament, Trina Gulliver maintained her unbeaten record as she won her seventh successive final. However, she needed a sudden-death leg to defeat Francis Hoenselaar. This was the fourth time in succession, and fifth overall, that Hoenselaar had lost in the final.

== Pre-Tournament Odds ==
The odds before the tournament began (supplied by official on-site bookmakers, Coral)

- Michael van Gerwen 9–4
- Martin Adams 4–1
- Gary Anderson 8–1
- Jelle Klaasen 10–1
- Mervyn King 16–1
- Mark Webster 20–1
- Simon Whitlock 25–1
- Ted Hankey 25–1

- Vincent van der Voort 28–1
- Shaun Greatbatch 33–1
- Co Stompe 33–1
- Darryl Fitton 33–1
- Martin Atkins 40–1
- Andy Fordham 40–1
- Niels de Ruiter 40–1
- Mike Veitch 40–1

- Tony Eccles 50–1
- John Walton 50–1
- Tony O'Shea 50–1
- Paul Hanvidge 50–1
- Martin Phillips 66–1
- Goran Klemme 66–1
- Gary Robson 66–1
- Brian Woods 80–1

- Paul Hogan 80–1
- Mario Robbe 80–1
- Brian Sorensen 100–1
- Gary Fenn 100–1
- Paul Gibbs 100–1
- Davy Richardson 100–1
- Phill Nixon 150–1
- Albertino Essers 150–1

== Seeds ==
Men

1. (England) Martin Adams
2. (Scotland) Gary Anderson
3. (Netherlands) Michael van Gerwen
4. (England) Tony Eccles
5. (England) Mervyn King
6. (Australia) Simon Whitlock
7. (England) Darryl Fitton
8. (England) Ted Hankey
9. (Netherlands) Vincent van der Voort
10. (England) Martin Atkins
11. (Netherlands) Niels de Ruiter
12. (Scotland) Mike Veitch
13. (England) Shaun Greatbatch
14. (England) John Walton
15. (Scotland) Paul Hanvidge
16. (Netherlands) Co Stompé

Women

1. (England) Trina Gulliver
2. (Netherlands) Francis Hoenselaar
3. (Netherlands) Karin Krappen
4. (Russia) Anastasia Dobromyslova

== Prize money ==
The prize money was £224,000 for the men's event and £11,000 for the women's event.

Men's Champion: £70,000
Runner-Up: £30,000
Semi-finalists (2): £11,000
Quarter-finalists (4): £6,000
Last 16 (8): £4,250
Last 32 (16): £2,750

Women's Champion: £6,000
Runner-Up: £2,000
Semi-finalists (2): £1,000
Quarter-finalists (4): £500

There was also a shared 9 Dart Checkout prize of £52,000, along with a High Checkout prize of £2,000 per event.

== Television coverage ==
The tournament was covered by the BBC in the UK and SBS6 in the Netherlands. Eurosport also broadcast the event on a pan-European basis, but the contract excluded them from showing the tournament to UK viewers.

The viewing figures for the final in the UK were 3.3 million (0.32 million down on 2006). The Dutch audience for the final was 1,201,000.

== Draw and results ==
=== Men's ===
- Match distances in sets are quoted in brackets at the top of each round. All sets best of five legs, unless there is a final set tie-break

First round (best of 5 sets)
1	(England) Martin Adams (100.68)	3
(England) Tony O'Shea (94.32)	0
16	(Netherlands) Co Stompé (91.68)	3
(Netherlands) Jelle Klaasen (86.49)	0
8	(England) Ted Hankey (90.90)	3
(Netherlands) Mario Robbe (83.25)	0
9	(Netherlands) Vincent van der Voort (87.24)	1
Q	(England) Davy Richardson (90.03)	3
5	(England) Mervyn King (96.06)	3
Q	(England) Paul Gibbs (92.40)	0
12	(Scotland) Mike Veitch (87.36)	3
(Sweden) Göran Klemme (84.99)	0
4	(England) Tony Eccles (85.83)	3
(Wales) Mark Webster (84.51)	0
13	(England) Shaun Greatbatch (81.06)	3
(England) Paul Hogan (83.40)	1
2	(Scotland) Gary Anderson (89.10)	2
(Netherlands) Albertino Essers (87.90)	3
15	(Scotland) Paul Hanvidge (85.65)	3
(Wales) Martin Phillips (86.97)	2
7	(England) Darryl Fitton (86.40)	1
Q	(England) Phill Nixon (92.43)	3
10	(England) Martin Atkins (86.85)	3
(England) Gary Fenn (80.52)	0
6	(Australia) Simon Whitlock	bye
(England) Andy Fordham	w/d
11	(Netherlands) Niels de Ruiter (87.15)	3
Q	(England) Brian Woods (91.83)	0
3	(Netherlands) Michael van Gerwen (89.49)	2
(England) Gary Robson (90.15)	3
14	(England) John Walton (93.30)	3
(Denmark) Brian Sorensen (85.02)	2

Second round (best of 7)
1	(England) Martin Adams (93.18)	4
16	(Netherlands) Co Stompé (89.37)	1
8	(England) Ted Hankey (88.35)	4
Q	(England) Davy Richardson (86.82)	3
5	(England) Mervyn King (90.63)	4
12	(Scotland) Mike Veitch (90.69)	2
4	(England) Tony Eccles (85.38)	4
13	(England) Shaun Greatbatch (79.71)	0
(Netherlands) Albertino Essers (80.43)	1
15	(Scotland) Paul Hanvidge (85.20)	4
Q	(England) Phill Nixon (81.12)	4
10	(England) Martin Atkins (80.73)	1
6	(Australia) Simon Whitlock (88.74)	3
11	(Netherlands) Niels de Ruiter (87.54)	4
(England) Gary Robson (90.96)	4
14	(England) John Walton (94.11)	3

Quarter-finals (best of 9)
1	(England) Martin Adams (89.73)	5
8	(England) Ted Hankey (89.34)	3
5	(England) Mervyn King (88.26)	5
4	(England) Tony Eccles (90.78)	4
15	(Scotland) Paul Hanvidge (83.40)	4
Q	(England) Phill Nixon (83.40)	5
11	(Netherlands) Niels de Ruiter (87.72)	5
(England) Gary Robson (85.59)	4

Semi-finals (best of 11)
1	(England) Martin Adams (91.62)	6
5	(England) Mervyn King (88.77)	5
Q	(England) Phill Nixon (86.10)	6
11	(Netherlands) Niels de Ruiter (84.19)	4

Final (best of 13)
1	(England) Martin Adams (90.30)	7
Q	(England) Phill Nixon (87.09)	6

Q – qualifier
Andy Fordham withdrew from his first round match due to ill health

== Women ==
Quarter-finals; Losers £500
4	(Russia) Anastasia Dobromyslova 81.30	2
(Sweden) Carina Ekberg 70.56	0
1	(England) Trina Gulliver 81.57	2
(Netherlands) Carla Molema 77.49	0
3	(Netherlands) Karin Krappen 65.43	1
(England) Apylee Jones 73.65	2
2	(Netherlands) Francis Hoenselaar 67.47	2
(Australia) Carol Forwood 66.03	1

Semi-finals; Losers £1,000
4	(Russia) Anastasia Dobromyslova 75.34	0
1	(England) Trina Gulliver 78.60	2
(England) Apylee Jones 64.23	1
2	(Netherlands) Francis Hoenselaar 63.42	2

Final; Winner £6,000; Runner-up £2,000
1	(England) Trina Gulliver 80.61	2
2	(Netherlands) Francis Hoenselaar 79.23	1

== Tournament Review ==
Day One Saturday 6 January
Jelle Klaasen's defence of his world championship ended in the first round with a defeat by fellow Dutchman, Co Stompé. Klaasen, who had a difficult year since his victory over Raymond van Barneveld in last year's final was ranked lower than his opponent and lost in straight sets. It was the sixth time that a champion failed to win his opening match on the defence of the title. Stompé's victory was his first at the tournament since 2002 – having lost in the first round at the last five attempts.

Davy Richardson won his first match fourteen years after his first attempt. He had lost in the first round in 1993 (to Steve Beaton), 1999 (to Co Stompé), 2001 (to Jez Porter), 2002 (to Wayne Mardle) and 2005 (to Martin Adams) but his bad run ended with a victory over number nine seed Vincent van der Voort.

No problems for top seed Martin Adams and other seeded players Mervyn King, Ted Hankey and Mike Veitch who all earned places in the second round with straight sets victories.

Day Two Sunday 7 January
The second day produced a series of shocks as the bookmaker's pre-tournament favourite for the title, Michael van Gerwen lost to Gary Robson. The 17-year-old World Masters champion was 9/4 favourite for the title, but found himself trailing through most of the match. Gerwen shown some signs of the form that took him number three in the world, but his night could be summed up by his start to match. He took the first leg against the darts, then hit three single ones to start the next leg. The inconsistently plagued him throughout the match as did his sponsors logo on his shirt which he had to keep pushing back into place. Robson, winner of the 2005 World Darts Trophy missed darts in the final set to clinch the match but finally hit a double four in the eighth leg to seal the win.

Earlier in the day the shocks started with Gary Anderson and Darryl Fitton making early exits. Albertino Essers, a Dutchman who had suffered from dartitis in recent years, ended second seed Anderson's hopes with a 3–2 win.

Fitton, who made his trademark entrance dancing to Madness hit One Step Beyond..., took the first set against qualifier Phill Nixon but then lost nine consecutive legs to go down 3–1. Nixon, making his debut in the tournament at the age of 50, hit checkouts of 121 and 110 as he refused to allow the seventh seed any way back into the match.

Tony Eccles, seeded four but a 50/1 outsider for the title beat promising Welshman Mark Webster in straight sets. Webster failed to show the form that took him to a Europe Cup singles title and like van Gerwen earlier in the evening, his tournament debut ended in defeat.

Day Three Monday 8 January
Day three's play was overshadowed by the withdrawal from the tournament by 2004 champion Andy Fordham. Fordham, who had had health problems for some time, suffered breathing difficulties as a result of a chest infection and was taken to hospital from the venue. His scheduled opponent, Australia's Simon Whitlock, thus received a walkover into the second round. It was the first time a player had withdrawn from a match since the 1979 World Championship, when Alan Evans pulled out of the third-place play-off, also due to ill health.

When play started, the three seeded players in action all progressed to the last 16, but John Walton and Paul Hanvidge had struggles on their hands, both going through 3–2. Walton, the 2001 champion, was taken to a tie-break in the final set by Brian Sørensen, before finally winning 5 legs to 3. Meanwhile, an emotional Hanvidge defeated his good friend, Martin Phillips, and then dedicated the victory to his mother, who had died on Christmas Day.

Day Four Tuesday 9 January
The second round of the tournament got underway with the first four matches from the top half of the draw. This half had seen few shocks in terms of the seedings, with only the number 9 seed, Vincent van der Voort, losing in the first round. The trend continued in the second round as Martin Adams (seeded 1), Tony Eccles (4), Mervyn King (5) and Ted Hankey (8) all made it to the quarter-finals. Out of the four, Hankey had the most difficulty in progressing: he was 2–0 and 3–2 down against Davy Richardson, before a maximum 170 checkout at the start of the final set finally swung the match in his favour. Richardson had been battling the pain of broken ribs in the tournament.

King's opponent, Mike Veitch, complained that he had been put off by King shouting whilst he retrieved his darts from the board. Nonetheless, King secured a quarter-final meeting with Eccles, while Hankey set up a clash with Adams.

Day Five Wednesday 10 January
Unseeded Gary Robson came from 3–1 behind to defeat 2001 champion John Walton and reach the quarter-finals. This guaranteed a first-time finalist from the bottom half of the draw. His opponent would be Dutchman Niels de Ruiter, who also needed a deciding set to beat number 6 seed Simon Whitlock.

Phill Nixon, a first-time qualifier at the age of 50, followed up his victory over number 7 seed Darryl Fitton with a 4–1 win against number 10 seed Martin Atkins. This set up a quarter-final with number 15 seed Paul Hanvidge, who beat Albertino Essers 4–1.

Day Six Thursday 11 January
Day six saw the first two quarter-finals settled, as top seed Martin Adams saw off 2000 champion Ted Hankey 5–3 while Mervyn King beat Tony Eccles 5–4. King hit ten 180s in his match while coming from 3–0 behind, before revealing in his post-match interview that he had nearly walked out of the tournament in response to speculation about a possible switch to the PDC. He said, "I nearly packed my darts away and went home. You nearly didn't have a quarter-final. It was that close."

Meanwhile, Adams took the first two sets, before Hankey levelled at 2–2 and 3–3. "The Count" then narrowly missed a 138 checkout which would have given him the seventh set, and Adams responded by taking that set and breaking the throw in the eighth. He then missed seven darts for victory, before finally sealing it with a double five. By coincidence, Adams had beaten Hankey by the same scoreline at the same stage two years previously.

Day Seven Friday 12 January
The semi-final line-up was completed with the conclusion of the quarter-finals. Both games went to the final set with Niels de Ruiter maintaining the Dutch interest in the event, defeating Gary Robson. Robson took the first two sets, then de Ruiter hit two 13, one 14 and one 15 dart leg in his comeback to level.

The deciding leg of the fifth set was amongst the highest standard leg in the history of the tournament. Robson opened with 140, then de Ruiter hit his 5th 180 of the match. Robson's 140 was followed with another 180 leaving a nine-dart opportunity. Robson's ton left 121 and when de Ruiter missed the nine-darter and left himself on 36 for a ten-dart finish, Robson checked out the 121 to go 3–2 up in sets. He took the next set as well but de Ruiter battled back again to level. Robson hit a bullseye and a double 16 to save the match twice in the final set but de Ruiter's sixth dart for the match (at double 18) secured the win.

Phill Nixon, the 150–1 outsider at the start of the tournament, progressed to the semi-final with a narrow 5–4 win over Scotland's Paul Hanvidge. Nixon looked to be coasting to the last four when he led 4–1 but then missed six darts for the match and allowed Hanvidge the chance to get back into it. Nixon hit a 105 finish in the fourth leg of the final set to finally close out the match.

The Women's final followed and despite dropping her first set at the tournament since the quarter-finals in 2003, Trina Gulliver went on to clinch her seventh successive title and maintain her unbeaten run in the event. Francis Hoenselaar pushed her all the way, and the match went to a sudden-death fifth leg in the final set. Gulliver won the throw for the bull to start the final leg and a 100, 140, 140 start left her in a commanding position to seal the match. She clinched the title with a double 18, her fourth dart for the match.

Day Eight Saturday 13 January
Both semi-finals were played in their traditional Saturday afternoon timeslot and the first match was between number one seed Martin Adams and number five seed Mervyn King. Adams looked to be coasting towards the final when he took a 5–2 set lead, but then King began to fightback with one 12-darter and three 13-darters. When King took six consecutive legs to level the match it looked like Adams had blown his chance to reach the final, just as he'd blown a lead in the final of the World Masters in October. This time he held his nerve by taking all three legs in the deciding set to reach his second world final.

The second semi-final saw Dutchman Niels de Ruiter against the surprise package of the tournament Phill Nixon. Nixon won the first three sets before de Ruiter took the fourth. But Nixon continued his great run and went 5–1 up. De Ruiter then produced a fightback to take the 7th, 8th and 9th sets to trail 4–5. Nixon regained his composure in the 10th set and hit his 14th and 15th 180s during the set to close out the match and reach the final.

Day Nine Sunday 14 January
It was a memorable final with two 50-year-old players battling it out for their first world title. Adams was the strong favourite, having been the number one seed. Nixon was the 150–1 outsider at the start of the event but had beaten a seeded player in each round on the way to the final.

Adams looked like he was going to walk away with an easy victory when he went into the break having taken the first six sets and needing just one to win. Adams then threw for the match at 2–1 in the seventh set. Nixon had other ideas and started to claw his way back into it. Adams missed four darts that could have won him the match and started to look more worried until eventually Nixon drew level.

Nixon threw first in the deciding set and began with a 180, but Adams took the leg out in 12 darts after Nixon narrowly missed a 122 checkout. Adams then held his own throw to once again go within a leg of the title. Nixon once again narrowly missed a chance to hold his throw, this time with double-18 for a 110 checkout, and Adams finished 54 on double 20 to win his first World Championship at the fourteenth time of asking.

== Qualifiers ==
On 2 October, the BDO announced that the 2007 Championships would contain 16 seeded players for the first time since 1981. Two days later they announced that the top 26 players from the Invitational table would also qualify automatically. Defending champion Jelle Klaasen had slipped to 19 in the rankings at the time the seedings were announced, and has therefore missed out on being seeded. He was drawn against Co Stompé in the first round.

The qualifying event was held at Bridlington on Thursday 12 October, the day before the World Masters event. From a field of 239 players playing the best of 3 sets, four players emerged as qualifiers for the 2007 World Finals. Former champion, Tony David was defeated by Kierion Carter of Wales in the first qualifying round. Despite a run of four victories Bobby George (WDF Ranking 165) fell two rounds short of qualification for the finals.

The eventual qualifiers from the event were:

- Davy Richardson (England) WDF Ranking: unranked
- Brian Woods (England) WDF Ranking: 86
- Paul Gibbs (England) WDF Ranking: 60
- Phill Nixon (England) WDF Ranking: 272

The final place at Lakeside was reserved for the winner of the World Masters – but as Michael van Gerwen had already booked a place it was taken by Gary Fenn, who had won a stand-by play-off a few days earlier. Ironically, if Fenn was to progress to the second round he could come up against Phill Nixon – the man who had already "knocked him out" of the qualifying event for the World Championship on 12 October.

The draw for the event was made at Leisure World, Bridlington on 13 October 2006 at 10am by the owners of the Lakeside – Bob Potter and Barbara Leitch.

== See also ==
- 2007 in darts
