= Janni Larsen =

Danish darts player (born 1963)

Personal information
- Full name: Janni Maria Larsen
- Born: 7 July 1963 (age 63) Hillerød, Denmark
- Home town: Sønderborg, Denmark

Sport
- Sport: Darts
- Playing since: 1995
- Laterality: Right-handed

Organisation (see split in darts)
- BDO: 2004–2020
- WDF: 2004–
- Current world ranking: (WDF W) NR (17 August 2026)

WDF major events – best performances
- World Masters: Last 32: 2006

Other tournament wins
- Years
Danish Ch'ship	2010, 2015
Medal record
Women's Darts
Representing Denmark
WDF Europe Cup
Bronze medal – third place	2008 Copenhagen	Women's singles
Bronze medal – third place	2014 Bucharest	Women's team

Janni Maria Larsen (born 7 July 1963) is a Danish female professional darts player who currently plays in the World Darts Federation (WDF) events. She is a two-time Danish Champion. Her other big achievement to date was winning a two bronze medals at the WDF Europe Cup. She represented her country 16 times during the WDF World Cup and WDF Europe Cup.

== Career ==
Larsen started playing darts in 1995 and slowly developed her skills. She made her international debut in 2004 during the 2004 WDF Europe Cup in Tampere. This debut, however, was unsuccessful as she had already lost in her first match against Anne Kirk by 3–4 in legs. In the pairs competition, she also did not achieve a satisfactory result. A year later, she made her debut at the 2005 WDF World Cup, where she lost to Mojca Humar in the second round match by 0–4 in legs. In the following years, she was re-elected as a representative of Denmark during the 2006 WDF Europe Cup and 2007 WDF World Cup, but once again she did not achieve good results.

Ultimately, in 2008, she achieved her best singles result so far, winning a bronze medal at the 2008 WDF Europe Cup, beating strong rivals such as Monique Leßmeister and Jan Robbins on her way to the semi-finals. In her last match, she lost to Louise Hepburn by 3–4 in legs. In the following years, she did not repeat this result. In 2010, for private reasons, she did not take part in the WDF Europe Cup tournament, but won her first national championship. In 2015, she repeated this success.

Since 2009, in singles competitions during the WDF World Cup and WDF Europe Cup, she was beaten by Irina Armstrong (two times), Deta Hedman (two times), Felicity Sparks, Grace Crane, Colette Rudin, Rabia Dolgun, Vicky Pruim and Ekaterina Cherkasova. Over the years, she has not won more than one match in singles competition, but in the 2014 WDF Europe Cup as a Danish team member she won a bronze medal.

In her all career, she has participated in several international tournaments outside Denmark. Her best result is the semi-final of the Kirchheim Open in 2016. She has participated in the World Masters for seven times. She achieved the best result in 2006, where she was promoted to the third round, where she lost to Anastasia Dobromyslova by 1–4 in legs.

== Performance timeline ==
Tournament	2005	2006	2007	2008	2009	2010	2011	2012	2013	2014	2015	2016	2017	2018	2019	2020	2021	2022
WDF Ranked televised events
World Masters	1R	3R	DNQ			PR	DNQ	2R	DNQ		2R	1R	DNQ	2R	DNQ	NH		
