= Monique Lessmeister =

German darts player

Monique Leßmeister
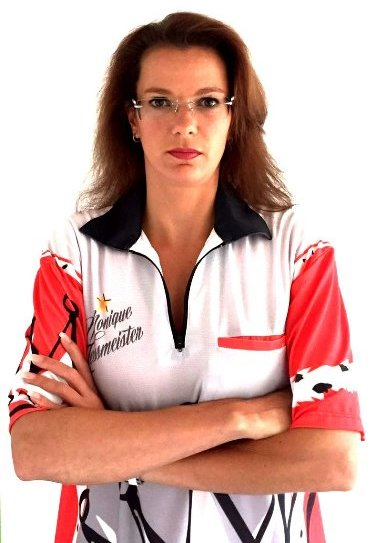
- Leßmeister in 2017

Personal information
- Full name: Monique Leßmeister
- Nickname: "Queen of Darts"
- Born: 21 August 1987 (age 39) Homburg, Saarland, West Germany
- Home town: Vilsbiburg, Germany

Sport
- Sport: Darts
- Playing since: 2004
- Darts: 23g Bull's
- Laterality: Right-handed

Organisation (see split in darts)
- BDO: 2008–2009
- WDF: 2008–2009, 2022–
- Current world ranking: (WDF W) NR (17 August 2026)

WDF major events – best performances
- World Masters: Last 16: 2009
- Finder Masters: Quarter Final: 2008
- Dutch Open: Last 32: 2022

Other tournament wins
- Years
DDV German Masters	2008, 2018, 2019
DDV Berlin	2007
DDV Nürnberg	2019
Bayerische Meisterschaft	2016, 2019
Rheinland Meisterschaft	2005, 2006, 2007, 2008, 2009

Monique Leßmeister (born 21 August 1987) is a German professional darts player who plays in the World Darts Federation (WDF) events. Her biggest achievement to date was promotion to the final phase of the World Masters and start in the Finder Darts Masters.

== Career ==
Leßmeister started playing darts in 2004, at the age of 17, in Rhineland-Palatinate, where she won every local championship title from 2005 to 2009. She is currently playing in the DDV Bundesliga for DC Hawks Vilsbiburg. Since 2007, Leßmeister has also competed in various DDV tournaments. Her first victory at this level of play was a Berlin Championship in 2007.

In 2008, she won the DDV German Masters for the first time and was invited to participate in the 2008 Zuiderduin Masters, where she lost to Francis Hoenselaar in the quarter-finals match by 3–4 in legs. There she was able to put Hoenselaar in a decider, but she failed. In 2008, she also represented Germany during the 2008 WDF Europe Cup, where she lost in the singles competition to eventual bronze medalist Janni Larsen. In the pairs competition with Bianka Strauch, they lost in the group-stage. At the 2008 World Masters she lost to Denise Cassidy in the preliminary round by 2–4 in legs.

In 2009, she advanced to German Women's Championship, where she lost in the final. This result guaranteed her start in the 2009 World Masters, where she lost to Francis Hoenselaar by 0–4 in legs in the third round match.

In 2016, she became the Bavarian Champion and repeated that success three years later. She also managed the double strike at the DDV German Masters in 2018 and 2019. Leßmeister was also invincible at the DDV ranking list tournament in Nuremberg. Overall, she played few tournaments to get to the top of the women's national rankings. In 2022, after advancing to the finals of the DDV German Masters, she returned to international competition in the World Darts Federation tournaments. At the 2022 Dutch Open, she was eliminated in the fourth round against Maria O'Brien by 3–4 in legs.

She was selected for the German national team during the 2022 WDF Europe Cup.

== Performance timeline ==
Tournament	2008	2009	2010-2021	2022
WDF Ranked televised events
World Masters	PR	3R	DNQ	
Finder Masters	QF	DNQ		NH
Dutch Open	DNP			4R
