= Petri Korte =

Finnish darts player (born 1966)

Personal information
- Nickname: "Kalle"
- Born: 12 December 1966 (age 59) Lahti, Finland
- Home town: Lahti, Finland

Sport
- Sport: Darts
- Playing since: 1990
- Darts: 17g Unicorn Phase 5
- Laterality: Right-handed
- Walk-on music: "Up Around the Bend" by Creedence Clearwater Revival

Organisation (see split in darts)
- BDO: 2002–2011, 2014–2015
- PDC: 2012–2014, 2015–2018

WDF major events – best performances
- World Masters: Last 64: 2002

PDC premier events – best performances
- World Championship: Last 64: 2012

Other tournament wins
- Years
PDC World Finland Qualifying Event	2011

Petri Korte (born 12 December 1966) is a Finnish former professional darts player who played in Professional Darts Corporation (PDC) events. He was known for his highly unorthodox throwing action, where he uses his non-throwing hand as a guide by holding it up in front of him whilst throwing.

== Career ==
Korte attempted to qualify for the 2010 BDO World Darts Championship but lost in the final round of international qualifiers to Jan Dekker.

He won the Nordic Invitational Singles in 2011. Korte and Sami Sanssi lost in the 2011 BDO British Open Pairs final, 1–3, to Garry Thompson and Scott Waites.

He qualified for the 2012 PDC World Darts Championship, where he beat Per Laursen 4–3 (legs) in the preliminary round. He played world number 3, James Wade, in the first round. Korte went 0–2 down before pulling back a set and then had two darts to level the match. He missed and Wade wrapped up the match 3–1.

Korte represented Finland with Marko Kantele in the 2012 PDC World Cup of Darts and together they were beaten 4–5 by Croatia in the first round. He lost in two quarter-finals on the Scandinavian tour in the rest of 2012 to finish 17th on the SDC Order of Merit.

== World Championship results ==
=== PDC ===
- 2012: First round (lost to James Wade 1–3) (sets)
