= Rilana Erades =

Dutch darts player (born 1984)

Personal information
- Nicknames: The Dutch Dynamite; Pebbles
- Born: November 4, 1984 (age 41) Leiden, Netherlands
- Home town: Voorschoten, Netherlands

Sport
- Sport: Darts
- Playing since: 2004
- Darts: 24 Gram Winmau Signautre
- Laterality: Right-handed

Organisation (see split in darts)
- BDO: 2007–2016

WDF major events – best performances
- World Championship: Semi-final: 2009
- World Masters: Semi-final: 2007
- Finder Masters: Last 6 Group: 2013

Other tournament wins
- Tournament: Years
- Antwerp Open: 2005, 2008

Rilana Erades – Honsbeek (born November 4, 1984) is a Dutch darts player. She used the nicknames The Dutch Dynamite and Pebbles for her matches.

Rilana is still active in darts, but on a slightly lower level, she plays for the regional selection DBBR.

== Career ==
Erades made her World Championship debut in 2008, losing in the quarter-finals to Karin Krappen. She had earlier reached the semi-finals of the 2007 World Masters, beating Irina Armstrong and Lisa Ashton before losing to Karen Lawman. She qualified for the 2009 BDO World Darts Championship as the stand-by qualifier where she defeated number 3 seed Julie Gore in the quarter-finals via a sudden death leg before losing to Francis Hoenselaar in the semis.

== World Championship results ==
=== BDO ===
- 2008: Quarter-finals (lost to Karin Krappen 0–2)
- 2009: Semi-finals (lost to Francis Hoenselaar 0–2)
- 2014: 1st round (lost to Fallon Sherrock 0–2)
