= Dyson Parody =

Gibraltarian darts player (born 1984)

Personal information
- Nickname: "Dynamite"
- Born: 7 August 1984 (age 42) Gibraltar
- Home town: Gibraltar

Sport
- Sport: Darts
- Playing since: 1991
- Darts: 24 Gram Winmau
- Laterality: Right-handed
- Walk-on music: "La Bomba" by Coco Caribe

Organisation (see split in darts)
- BDO: 2002–2008
- PDC: 2008–

WDF major events – best performances
- World Masters: Last 64: 2004, 2017

PDC premier events – best performances
- UK Open: Last 96: 2012

Other tournament wins
- Years
| GDA Carmelo Ellul | 2013 |
| GDA Dave Obee Singles | 2011 |
| GDA Joe Goldwin Classic | 2012 |
| GDA Johnny Neale Charity Singles | 2009, 2010 |
| GDA Masters Singles | 2012 |
| GDA Millenium Singles | 2011 |
| GDA National Day Open | 2012, 2015 |
| Gibraltar National Championships | 2010, 2011, 2015 |
| Gibraltar Open | 2012, 2019 |
| Torremolinos Open | 2015 |

Dyson Parody (born 7 August 1984) is a Gibraltarian professional darts player who plays in Professional Darts Corporation (PDC) events.

== Career ==
Parody represented Gibraltar with Dylan Duo in the 2010 PDC World Cup of Darts and together they were beaten 6–4 by Russia in the first round, and they were together again in the 2012 PDC World Cup of Darts and together they were beaten 5–4 by Denmark in the first round, with Duo missing two darts for the match. During the rest of 2012 he won four tournaments on the Gibraltar Darts Association tour.

Parody played in his third World Cup of Darts with Duo in February 2013, but they finished bottom of Group E after losing 5–2 to Poland and 5–0 to the Netherlands. In June he qualified for the Gibraltar Darts Trophy are Dylan Duo, Manuel Vilerio and George Federico, and despite opening his first round match with a 180, he was beaten 6–3 by Andy Hamilton. At the 2014 World Cup of Darts, Parody and Duo were beaten 5–2 by Sweden in the opening round. Parody whitewashed compatriot Henry Zapata 6–0 in the Gibraltar Darts Trophy taking out finishes of 152 and 101. He also checked out a 160 finish in the second round against Gary Anderson but lost 6–2.

On Day 2 of the 2015 PDC Q School, Parody completed a nine-dart finish in a first round match against Paul Milford, but went on to be beaten 5–4. Parody partnered Manuel Vilerio for the first time at the World Cup and they secured Gibraltar's first ever win in the event by defeating Italy 5–2. However, they lost their singles matches in the second round against Australia to be eliminated from the competition.

Parody qualifier in the 2016 Gibraltar Darts Trophy are Antony Lopez, David Francis and George Federico, Parody became the first player from Gibraltar to reach a European Tour event quarter-final, as well as the first player from Gibraltar to defeat a player who wasn't himself from Gibraltar. He did this by beating Dirk van Duijvenbode 6–3 in the first round. In the second round he defeated Jelle Klaasen 6–5 with a 93.39 three dart average. In the third round Parody beat Max Hopp 6–4. Parody's next opponent was eventual tournament winner and world number one Michael van Gerwen. Parody missed three match darts against Van Gerwen as he was knocked out at the quarter-final stage with a 6–5 loss. Parody and Manuel Vilerio lost in the first round of the World Cup 5–2 to Norway. He was beaten 6–4 by Javier Garcia Toquero in the semi-finals of the South European Qualifier for the 2017 World Championship.

At the 2017 Gibraltar Darts Trophy, Parody qualified as a host nation qualifier, alongside Justin Broton, Manuel Vilerio, Dylan Duo & Antony Lopez, but lost to Magnus Caris 6-1.

At the 2017 World Cup, Parody and Duo lost 5–2 to England in the opening round.

At the 2018 World Cup, Dyson Parody and Justin Broton lost 5–0 to Netherlands in the opening round.

At the 2019 World Cup, Parody and Antony Lopez lost 4–5 to Japan Seigo Asada and Haruki Muramatsu in the deciding legs.

At the 2019 Gibraltar Darts Trophy, Parody qualified as a host nation qualifier, alongside Antony Lopez, Justin Hewitt & David Francis. Parody beat Cor Dekker 6–5 and lost to Peter Wright 1–6.

At the 2019 WDF World Cup Parody represented Team Gibraltar alongside Jarvis Bautista, Antony Lopez & David Francis.

At the 2021 Gibraltar Darts Trophy, Parody qualified as a host nation qualifier, alongside Justin Hewitt, Craig Galliano and Justin Broton. Parody lost 4–6 to Kenny Neyens.
