= Karin Krappen =

Dutch darts player

Personal information
- Nickname: "Dolphin"
- Born: 10 December 1973 (age 52) Rotterdam, Netherlands
- Home town: Vlissingen, Netherlands

Sport
- Sport: Darts
- Playing since: 1992
- Darts: 27 Gram
- Laterality: Right-handed
- Walk-on music: "Thunderstruck" by AC/DC

Organisation (see split in darts)
- BDO: 2000–2017, 2022

WDF major events – best performances
- World Championship: Semi-final: 2004, 2008, 2009
- World Masters: Winner (1): 2007
- World Trophy: Winner (1): 2005
- Finder Masters: Semi-final: 2008, 2010

Other tournament wins
- Tournament: Years
- Antwerp Open Czech Open French Open Finnish Open Flanders Open Scottish Open Swedish Open: 2000; 2007, 2008, 2010; 2005; 2005; 2010; 2007; 2005, 2006

Karin Krappen (born 10 December 1973) is a Dutch former darts player. She is a former winner of the Women's World Darts Trophy and the Women's World Masters. She was nicknamed Dolphin.

== Career ==
Krappen made her World Championship debut in 2003, losing in the quarter-finals to Francis Hoenselaar. She went one step further in 2004, beating Anne Kirk in the quarter-finals but lost in the semis to Trina Gulliver. She then suffered quarter final exits the next three years, losing in 2005 again to Hoenselaar, 2006 to Jan Robbins and 2007 to Apylee Jones. She reached the semi-finals in 2008, defeating Rilana Erades in the quarter-finals but lost to Gulliver once more.

Krappen won the 2005 Women's World Darts Trophy, beating all the previous former champions along the way, defeating 2002 champion Mieke de Boer in the quarter-finals, 2003 champion Gulliver in the semis and 2004 champion Hoenselaar in the final. The ladies competition was discontinued afterwards, making Krappen its last winner.

She reached the final of the Women's World Masters in 2006, beating Julie Gore, Clare Bywaters and Carla Molema before losing once more to Hoenselaar. Krappen won the title in 2007, avenging her defeat of Jones in the World Championships by beating her in the quarter-finals and then defeated Gulliver before beating Karen Lawman in the final.

Krappen originally entered the 2009 Women's World Championship as a non-seeded qualifier, however after Anastasia Dobromyslova withdrew and defected to the PDC Krappen was made the number 4 seed. She defeated qualifier Kirk in the quarter-finals before losing to Gulliver again.

== World Championship results ==
=== BDO ===
- 2003: Quarter-finals (lost to Francis Hoenselaar 1–2)
- 2004: Semi-finals (lost to Trina Gulliver 0–2)
- 2005: Quarter-finals (lost to Francis Hoenselaar 0–2)
- 2006: Quarter-finals (lost to Jan Robbins 0–2)
- 2007: Quarter-finals (lost to Apylee Jones 1–2)
- 2008: Semi-finals (lost to Trina Gulliver 0–2)
- 2009: Semi-finals (lost to Trina Gulliver 0–2)
- 2014: 1st round (lost to Anastasia Dobromyslova 1–2)
