= Julie Gore =

Welsh darts player

Personal information
- Full name: Julie Robin Gore
- Nickname: "Ice Cube"
- Born: 5 August 1958 (age 68) Cardiff, Wales
- Home town: Llanelli, Wales

Sport
- Sport: Darts
- Playing since: 2002
- Darts: 25g Red Dragon
- Laterality: Right-handed
- Walk-on music: "Ice Ice Baby" by Vanilla Ice

Organisation (see split in darts)
- BDO: 2006–2017
- WDF: 2006–2017

WDF major events – best performances
- World Championship: Quarter-final: 2008, 2009, 2010, 2011, 2012, 2013, 2014
- World Masters: Winner (2): 2010, 2012
- World Trophy: Last 16: 2014
- Finder Masters: Winner (1): 2009
- Dutch Open: Winner (1): 2012

Other tournament wins
- Tournament: Years
- BDO International Open British Classic Denmark Open England Classic German Open Isle of Man Open Northern Ireland Open Turkey Open Welsh Classic Welsh Open Welsh Masters: 2010; 2009; 2008; 2011; 2008; 2007, 2008, 2009, 2010; 2006; 2008; 2005; 2009; 2010

Julie Robin Gore (born 5 August 1958) is a Welsh former professional darts player who competed in British Darts Organisation (BDO) and World Darts Federation (WDF) tournaments.

== Career ==
Gore made her BDO Women's World Championship debut in 2008, losing in the quarter-finals to Trina Gulliver. She later reached the semi-finals of the Women's World Masters, beating Irina Armstrong in the quarter-finals before losing to Anastasia Dobromyslova in the semi-finals.

Gore originally entered the 2009 BDO World Championship as the number 4 seed, but following Dobromyslova's defection to the Professional Darts Corporation she was moved up to the number 3 seed. She was drawn against standby qualifier Rilana Erades in the quarter-finals and lost 2–1.

In October 2010 she won her biggest title of her career at the 2010 World Masters beating Francis Hoenselaar 4–1 in the final and repeated the feat in October 2012, defeating Deta Hedman 4–1 in the 2012 final.

Julie qualified for the 2013 BDO World Darts Championship and made it through to the quarter-finals for the 6th year running but was beaten 0–2 by Trina Gulliver.

== World Championship results ==
=== BDO ===
- 2008: Quarter-finals (lost Trina Gulliver 1–2) (sets)
- 2009: Quarter-finals (lost Rilana Erades 1–2)
- 2010: Quarter-finals (lost Rhian Edwards 0–2)
- 2011: Quarter-finals (lost Rhian Edwards 1–2)
- 2012: Quarter-finals (lost Anastasia Dobromyslova 0–2)
- 2013: Quarter-finals (lost Trina Gulliver 0–2)
- 2014: Quarter-finals (lost Ann-Louise Peters 0–2)
