= Carla Molema =

Dutch darts player (born 1988)

Personal information
- Born: 30 November 1988 (age 37) Groningen, Netherlands
- Home town: Groningen, Netherlands

Sport
- Sport: Darts

Organisation (see split in darts)
- BDO: 2006–2015

WDF major events – best performances
- World Championship: Quarter-final: 2007, 2009
- World Masters: Semi-final: 2006
- Finder Masters: Quarter-final: 2008, 2009

Other tournament wins
- Years
Antwerp Open	2009
German Open	2006
Swiss Open	2008
Girls WDF Europe Youth Cup	2005
Girls WDF Europe Cup	2005

Carla Molema (born 30 November 1988) is a Dutch former darts player.

== Career ==
In 2007, Molema became the youngest player at the Women's World Darts Championship, aged 18. She lost in the quarter-finals to Trina Gulliver. She had previously reached the semi-finals of the 2006 Women's World Masters, beating Anastasia Dobromyslova in the quarter-finals before losing to Karin Krappen. Molema also played in a PDC ranked event, the Thialf Darts Trophy, beating Hermie van Orsouw in the first round before losing to John Lokken.

Molema originally missed out on qualifying for the 2009 Women's World Championship, but after Anastasia Dobromyslova's withdrawal and defection to the PDC, Molema was invited to the event as the highest ranked non-qualifier. She was drawn against Francis Hoenselaar in the quarter-final and lost 2–0.
