= Paul Hanvidge =

Scottish darts player

Personal information
- Full name: Paul Albert Hanvidge
- Nickname: "Polly Boy"
- Born: 15 June 1961 (age 65) Glasgow, Scotland
- Home town: Barrhead, Scotland

Sport
- Sport: Darts
- Playing since: 1986
- Darts: 26 Gram Tommy Darts
- Laterality: Left-handed
- Walk-on music: "Flower of Scotland"

Organisation (see split in darts)
- BDO: 1995–2012
- PDC: 2019

WDF major events – best performances
- World Championship: Quarter Finals: 2006, 2007
- World Masters: Last 32: 2000, 2004
- World Trophy: Last 16: 2005
- Int. Darts League: Last 32 Group: 2006
- Finder Masters: Last 24 Group: 2005

Other tournament wins
- Years
| Central Scotland Open | 2005 |
| German Open | 2005 |
| Scotland National Ch'ship | 2006 |
| WDF Europe Cup Pairs | 2006 |

Paul Albert Hanvidge (born 15 June 1961) is a former Scottish professional darts player. His best achievement is reaching the quarter-finals of the Lakeside World Championship twice.

== Career ==
Hanvidge was the 2005 German Open Champion and made his World Championship debut in 2004, losing a first round match to Jarkko Komula. He missed out on qualification for the event in 2005, but returned in 2006 and beat Co Stompé and Simon Whitlock before losing 3–5 to Shaun Greatbatch in the last eight.

He made the quarterfinals again in 2007, beating Martin Phillips and Albertino Essers before losing to 50-year-old qualifier, Phill Nixon, in the quarterfinals. He wore a black armband in memory of his mother, who had died on Christmas Day.

In 2008, he suffered a first-round exit, losing to Brian Woods, whose average of 96.51 was the highest of the first round. Hanvidge reached the final of the 2008 Norway Open, losing to Willy van de Wiel. Hanvidge was forced to qualify for the 2009 BDO World Championship, but fell three rounds short in a defeat to Paul Gibbs. Hanvidge reached the semifinals of the 2009 British Open, defeating John Walton and Daryl Gurney along the way. He was beaten by Martin Atkins. Hanvidge earned enough ranking points to secure a place in the 2010 BDO World Championship, but was beaten in the first round by Scott Waites while reportedly suffering a bout of dartitis.

== World Championship results ==
=== BDO ===
- 2004: 1st round (lost to Jarkko Komula 1–3)
- 2006: Quarter-final (lost to Shaun Greatbatch 3–5)
- 2007: Quarter-final (lost to Phill Nixon 4–5)
- 2008: 1st round (lost to Brian Woods 0–3)
- 2010: 1st round (lost to Scott Waites 0–3)
