= Willy van de Wiel =

Dutch darts player

Personal information
- Nickname: "Free Willy"
- Born: 15 April 1982 (age 44) Rijen, Netherlands

Sport
- Sport: Darts
- Playing since: 2000
- Darts: 22g Winmau Bobby George
- Laterality: Right-handed
- Walk-on music: "Freefall" by Jeckyll & Hyde

Organisation (see split in darts)
- BDO: 2007–2016
- PDC: 2016–2017

WDF major events – best performances
- World Championship: Last 16: 2010, 2011, 2012
- World Masters: Last 40: 2008, 2009, 2010
- Finder Masters: Last 24 Group: 2008, 2009, 2010, 2011

Other tournament wins
- Tournament: Years
- Norway Open Swedish Open Hungarian Open Vonderke Masters WDF World Cup Team: 2008; 2009; 2010; 2009; 2009

Other achievements
- Dongen Open 2015; Falkie Open 2014; Open Noord Nederland 2008

Willy van de Wiel (born 15 April 1982) is a Dutch former professional darts player.

== BDO career ==
Van de Wiel won the 2008 Norway Open, beating Dave Chisnall, Stephen Bunting and John Henderson, before beating Paul Hanvidge in the final. He also made quarter-final appearances in the Swiss Open and the Welsh Classic.

He received a wildcard entry into the 2008 Zuiderduin Masters, replacing Remco van Eijden who withdrew from the tournament to play in the 2009 PDC World Darts Championship. Van de Wiel lost both group games, losing 0–5 in legs to Brian Woods and 1–5 to Gary Robson.

Van de Wiel earned one of the non-seeded places for the 2009 BDO World Darts Championship, meaning he avoided having to qualify for the event. He drew reigning BDO world champion Mark Webster in the first round and lost 0–3. He then reached the final of the 2009 Dutch Open, losing to Darryl Fitton. He also won the 2009 Swedish Open, beating local Anders Astrom in the final.

He participated in the 2010 BDO World Darts Championship, exiting the tournament in the second round after losing 1–4 to Ted Hankey. Van de Wiel won the 2010 Hungarian Open by beating Joey ten Berge 6–5 in the final.

Van de Wiel entered the 2011 BDO World Darts Championship as the ninth seed and defeated Scottish qualifier Alan Soutar in the first round before losing in the second round to Ross Smith.

== Personal life ==
Van de Wiel lives with his partner Patty in Rijen and together they have a son named Luca (born 2011).

== World Championship performances ==
=== BDO ===
- 2009: 1st round (lost to Mark Webster 0–3) (sets)
- 2010: 2nd round (lost to Ted Hankey 1–4)
- 2011: 2nd round (lost to Ross Smith 1–4)
- 2012: 2nd round (lost to Martin Atkins 2–4)
- 2013: 1st round (lost to Scott Waites 0–3)
