= Francis Hoenselaar =

Dutch darts player

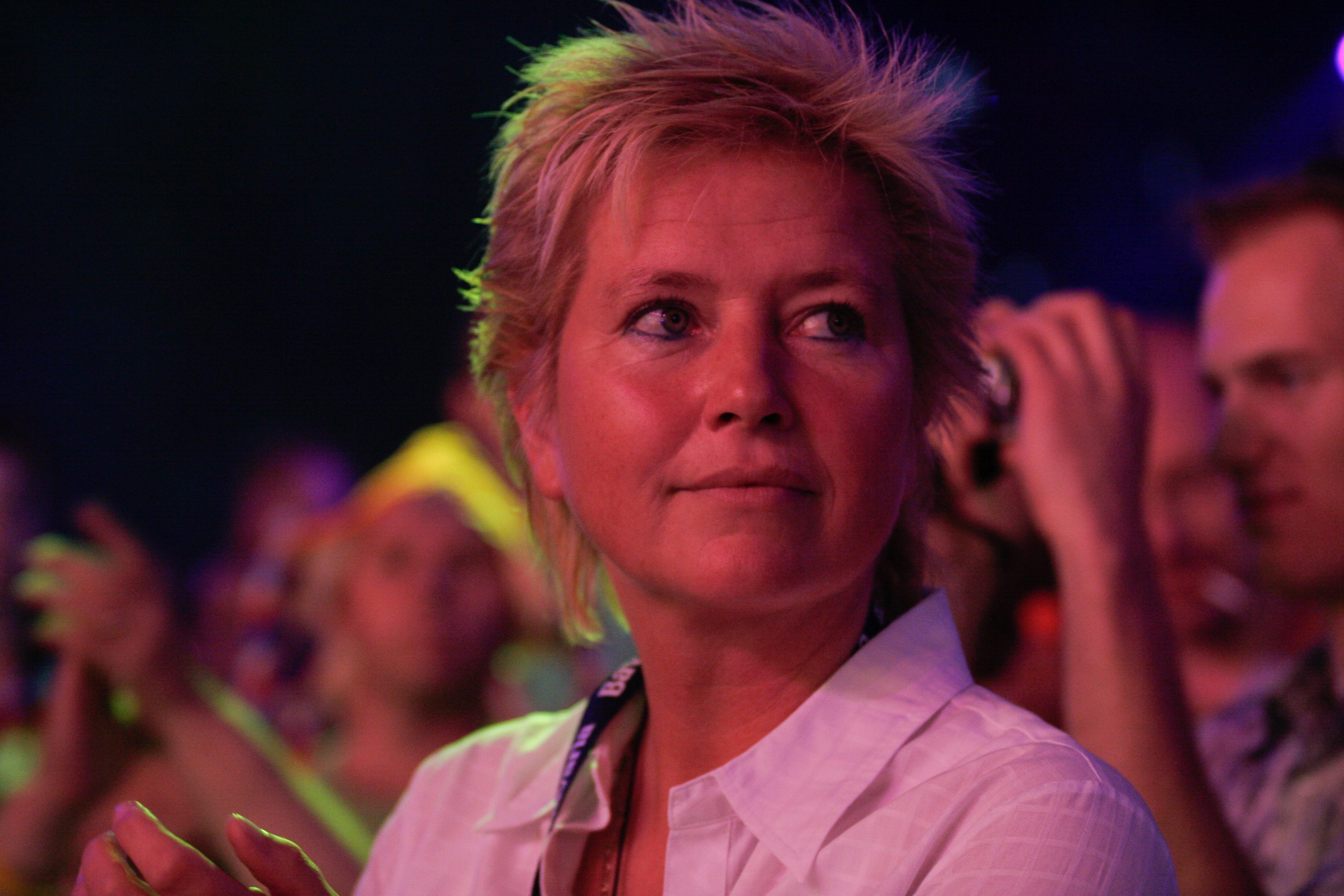
- Hoenselaar in 2006

Personal information
- Nickname: "The Dutch Crown"
- Born: 15 January 1965 (age 61) Rotterdam, Netherlands
- Home town: Rotterdam, Netherlands

Sport
- Sport: Darts
- Playing since: 1990
- Darts: Datadart
- Laterality: Right-handed
- Walk-on music: "Zomer" by André Hazes

Organisation (see split in darts)
- BDO: 1994–2012

WDF major events – best performances
- World Championship: Winner (1) 2009
- World Masters: Winner (3) 1999, 2006, 2008
- World Trophy: Winner (1) 2004
- Finder Masters: Winner (1) 1995
- Dutch Open: Winner (7) 1995, 1996, 1997, 1998, 2000, 2002, 2004

PDC premier events – best performances
- Grand Slam: Group Stages: 2009

Other tournament wins
- Tournament: Years
- WDF World Cup WDF Europe Cup WDF World Cup Pairs WDF Europe Cup Pairs Antwerp Open BDO International Open Belgium Open British Open Canadian Open Center Parcs Masters Denmark Open England Open Finnish Open French Open German Open Isle of Man Open Northern Ireland Open Norway Open Spring Cup Swedish Open Swiss Open Tops of Holland Welsh Classic Welsh Open: 2001; 1996, 2004, 2010; 1993, 2001; 2000, 2002; 1994, 1995, 1996, 1999, 2001, 2002, 2003, 2004, 2006, 2007, 2011; 2008; 1993, 1995, 1997, 1998, 2002, 2007; 1995, 1997, 2003; 1997; 2010; 1997, 1998, 2000, 2002, 2007; 1999, 2005; 1997, 1998, 2003, 2005; 1996, 1997, 1998, 2006; 1996, 1999, 2001, 2002, 2004; 1999, 2000, 2005, 2012; 2008; 1995, 1997, 2002, 2003, 2006; 1991, 1994, 2001, 2002; 1996, 2001; 1994, 1995, 1998, 2001, 2003, 2004, 2005; 2009; 2007, 2008; 1998

Francisca Hoenselaar (born 15 January 1965) is a Dutch former professional darts player. She was nicknamed "The Dutch Crown". A leading player in the women's game, Hoenselaar was the 2009 British Darts Organisation Women's World Darts Champion, having defeated Trina Gulliver in the final. Prior to this, she had been runner-up no fewer than five times – each time losing to Gulliver.

== Career ==
A Netherlands native, Hoenselaar has won the Dutch title fifteen times. She first represented the Netherlands at the WDF World Cup in 1991. She won the Europe Cup women's singles in 1996, 2004 and 2010, and the World Cup women's singles in 2001. She aimed to retire from the Dutch team after the 2011 World Cup.

Gulliver has long been her main rival, and got the better of her in five World Championship finals (2002, 2004, 2005, 2006 and 2007). Indeed, Gulliver was unbeaten at the Women's World Championship until 2008. Hoenselaar entered the 2008 World Championship as the number one seed, but lost in the first round to qualifier Stephanie Smee.

Hoenselaar won the World Masters in 1999, and again in 2006. She defeated Anastasia Dobromyslova to win her third World Masters title in 2008, in what was Dobromyslova's final tournament before her defection to the Professional Darts Corporation.

In 2009, Hoenselaar finally won the Women's World Championship, beating Gulliver in the final to record her first World Championship title, and a winner's cheque of £6,000. This earned her a spot at the 2009 Grand Slam of Darts, and was drawn in Group D with Raymond van Barneveld, John Part and Kevin Painter. Hoenselaar won four legs over her three matches, as she bowed out in the group stages.

Hoenselaar was unseeded for the 2010 Women's World Championship and was drawn against Gulliver once more in the first round. Gulliver won by 2 sets to 0, and she went on to win her eighth world title. Hoenselaar failed to qualify for the 2011 and 2012 Women's World Championships.

In August 2014, despite not playing in any tournament since the 2012 Women's Isle Of Man Open for which she won. Hoenselaar announced her retirement from the game due to persistent injuries.

== World Championship results ==
=== BDO ===
- 2001: Semi Finals (lost to Mandy Solomons 1–2)
- 2002: Runner Up (lost to Trina Gulliver 1–2)
- 2003: Semi Finals (lost to Anne Kirk 0–2)
- 2004: Runner Up (lost to Trina Gulliver 0–2)
- 2005: Runner Up (lost to Trina Gulliver 0–2)
- 2006: Runner Up (lost to Trina Gulliver 0–2)
- 2007: Runner Up (lost to Trina Gulliver 1–2)
- 2008: Quarter Finals (lost to Stephanie Smee 0–2)
- 2009: Winner (beat Trina Gulliver 2–1)
- 2010: Quarter Finals (lost to Trina Gulliver 0–2)

Awards
Preceded by Letitia Vriesde	Rotterdam Sportswoman of the Year; 1996–1997	Succeeded by Leontien van Moorsel
