= Daniel Starkey =

Daniel Starkey or Dan Starkey may refer to:

- Daniel Starkey (darts player), see 2012 UK Open Qualifier 6
- Dan Starkey (actor), an English actor
- Dan Starkey (series), a novel series by Col
