= 2014 Premier League Darts =

Darts competition

2014 Betway Premier League Darts

Tournament information
- Dates: 6 February–22 May 2014

Champion(s)
- Raymond van Barneveld (NED)

The 2014 Betway Premier League Darts was a darts tournament organised by the Professional Darts Corporation; the tenth edition of the tournament. The event began at the Liverpool Arena in Liverpool on Thursday 6 February, and ended at The O_{2} Arena, London on Thursday 22 May. The tournament was shown live on Sky Sports in the UK and Ireland. The new title sponsor was Betway.

Michael van Gerwen was the defending champion and he reached the final this year, but lost 10–6 to Raymond van Barneveld who won his first Premier League title.

== Players ==
The competitors were announced on 1 January 2014 following the Ladbrokes World Darts Championship final, with the top four players from the PDC Order of Merit to be joined by six Wildcards. The tournament format is identical to that of 2013, whereby after nine weeks the bottom two players are relegated. All players play each other once at that point. The remaining eight will then compete against each other in the final six rounds for the play-offs places.

Andy Hamilton (world no. 11) and 2009 Premier League Champion James Wade (world no. 6) did not return from last year, Wade there by missing out for the first time in seven years. PDC chairman Barry Hearn explained the decision was made to give Wade a rest to enable him more time to gain treatment for his health issues, but Wade released a statement the following day, describing the omission as "devastating" as he was "one of the four most consistent players in 2013". Wade also said he didn't ask to be left out and didn't decline an invitation, and that, with regards to the reason given by Hearn that he could gain treatment for his bipolar disorder, "no medical professional has suggested I take a break".

Player	Appearance in Premier League	Consecutive Streak	Order of Merit rank	Previous best performance	Qualification
(Netherlands) Michael van Gerwen	2nd	2	1	Winner (2013)	PDC Order of Merit
(England) Phil Taylor	10th	10	2	Winner (2005–2008, 2010, 2012)	PDC Order of Merit
(Australia) Simon Whitlock	5th	5	3	Runner-up (2012)	PDC Order of Merit
(England) Adrian Lewis	7th	5	4	Runner-up (2011)	PDC Order of Merit
(England) Dave Chisnall	1st	1	5	Debut	PDC Wildcard
(Scotland) Peter Wright	1st	1	7	Debut	PDC Wildcard
(England) Wes Newton	2nd	2	8	9th place (2013)	PDC Wildcard
(Scotland) Robert Thornton	2nd	2	9	5th place (2013)	PDC Wildcard
(Netherlands) Raymond van Barneveld	9th	9	10	Semi-finalist (2006–09, 2011, 2013)	Sky Sports Wildcard
(Scotland) Gary Anderson	4th	4	17	Winner (2011)	Sky Sports Wildcard

== Venues ==
Week seven saw a tournament record attendance with 11,000 fans in Leeds, which was also the only new city introduced on the circuit this year, although Glasgow had a new arena with The SSE Hydro making its debut.

(England) Liverpool	(England) Bournemouth	(Northern Ireland) Belfast	(Scotland) Glasgow
Liverpool Arena; Thursday 6 February	Bournemouth International Centre; Thursday 13 February	Odyssey Arena; Thursday 20 February	SSE Hydro; Thursday 27 February
(England) Exeter	(England) Nottingham	(England) Leeds	(Republic of Ireland) Dublin
Westpoint Exeter; Thursday 6 March	Nottingham Arena; Thursday 13 March	Leeds Arena; Thursday 20 March	The O_{2} Thursday 27 March
(Wales) Cardiff	(England) Sheffield	(Scotland) Aberdeen	(England) Manchester
Cardiff International Arena; Thursday 3 April	Motorpoint Arena; Thursday 10 April	AECC; Thursday 17 April	Manchester Arena; Thursday 24 April
(England) Birmingham	(England) Newcastle	(England) Brighton	(England) London
National Indoor Arena; Thursday 1 May	Newcastle Arena; Thursday 8 May	Brighton Centre; Thursday 15 May	The O_{2} Arena; Thursday 22 May

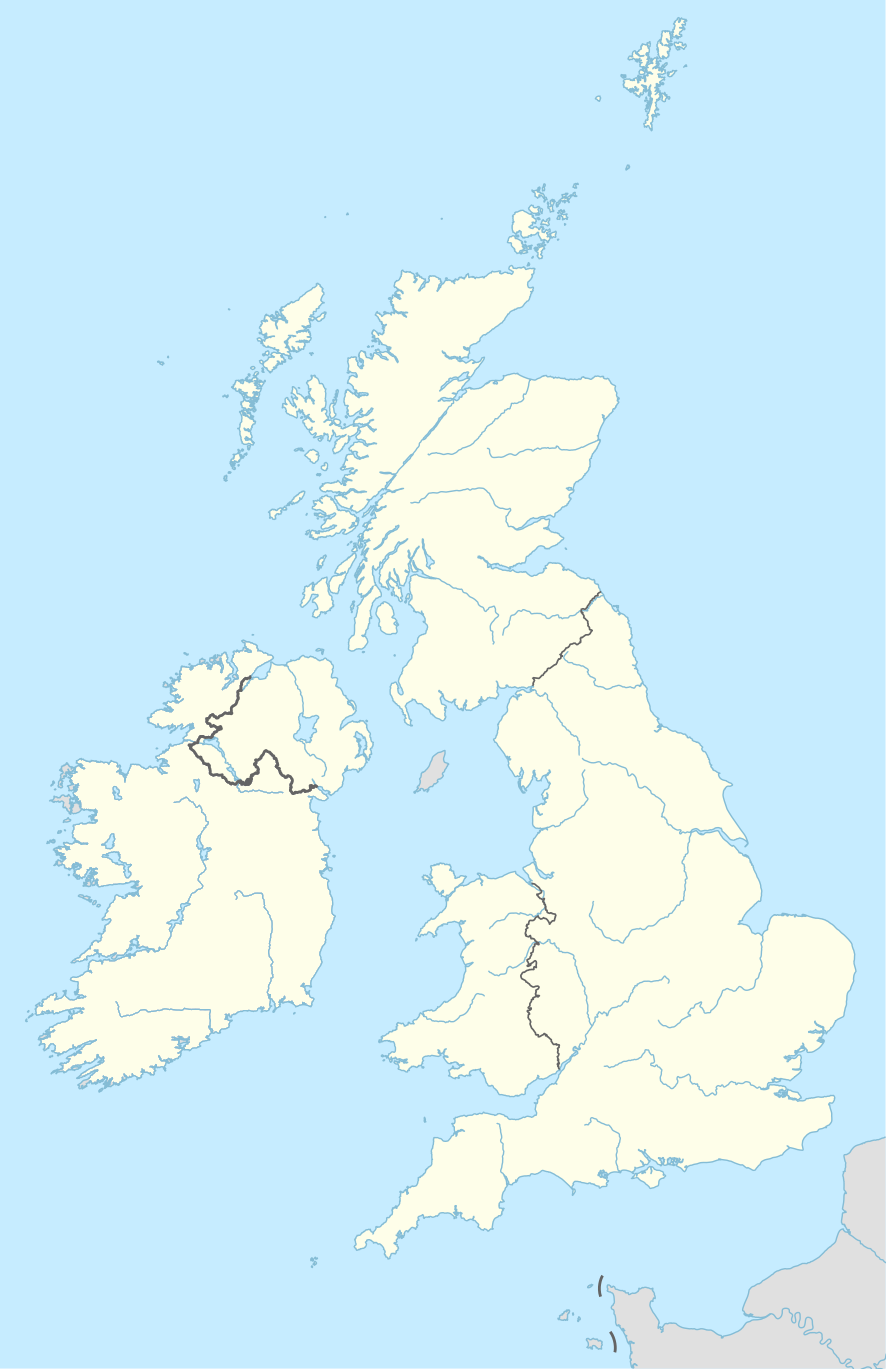
Locations of the 2014 Premier League venues

== Prize money ==
The prize-money was increased to £550,000 from £520,000 in 2013.

Stage	Prize money
Winner	£150,000
Runner-up	£75,000
Semi-finallists (x2)	£60,000
5th place	£50,000
6th place	£45,000
7th place	£35,000
8th place	£30,000
9th place	£25,000
10th place	£20,000
Total	£550,000

== Results ==
=== League stage ===
==== 6 February – Week 1 (Phase 1) ====
(England) Liverpool Arena, Liverpool

	Score	
Dave Chisnall (England); 93.87	7 – 5	(Scotland) Robert Thornton; 93.28
Peter Wright (Scotland); 97.53	7 – 3	(England) Wes Newton; 93.75
Raymond van Barneveld (Netherlands); 108.52	7 – 2	(Scotland) Gary Anderson; 100.71
Phil Taylor (England); 99.45	0 – 7	(Netherlands) Michael van Gerwen; 109.59
Simon Whitlock (Australia); 86.31	1 – 7	(England) Adrian Lewis; 99.13
Night's Average: 98.21
Highest Checkout: Adrian Lewis 130

==== 13 February – Week 2 (Phase 1) ====
(England) Bournemouth International Centre, Bournemouth

	Score	
Wes Newton (England); 91.36	7 – 5	(Netherlands) Raymond van Barneveld; 89.69
Dave Chisnall (England); 92.40	6 – 6	(Scotland) Peter Wright; 83.83
Gary Anderson (Scotland); 98.13	7 – 2	(Australia) Simon Whitlock; 90.05
Adrian Lewis (England); 100.57	7 – 3	(England) Phil Taylor; 98.27
Robert Thornton (Scotland); 90.23	5 – 7	(Netherlands) Michael van Gerwen; 95.83
Night's Average: 93.04
Highest Checkout: Wes Newton 149

==== 20 February – Week 3 (Phase 1) ====
(Northern Ireland) Odyssey Arena, Belfast

	Score	
Robert Thornton (Scotland); 105.21	7 – 2	(Scotland) Gary Anderson; 95.02
Dave Chisnall (England); 101.01	4 – 7	(Netherlands) Michael van Gerwen; 103.60
Peter Wright (Scotland); 100.40	7 – 4	(England) Phil Taylor; 101.03
Wes Newton (England); 93.82	7 – 2	(England) Adrian Lewis; 89.54
Raymond van Barneveld (Netherlands); 95.96	7 – 4	(Australia) Simon Whitlock; 95.44
Night's Average: 98.1
Highest Checkout: Gary Anderson 121

==== 27 February – Week 4 (Phase 1) ====
(Scotland) SSE Hydro, Glasgow

	Score	
Peter Wright (Scotland); 93.32	7 – 1	(England) Adrian Lewis; 90.85
Robert Thornton (Scotland); 82.66	6 – 6	(England) Wes Newton; 88.45
Simon Whitlock (Australia); 94.35	3 – 7	(England) Phil Taylor; 104.82
Michael van Gerwen (Netherlands); 98.25	5 – 7	(Netherlands) Raymond van Barneveld; 107.31
Dave Chisnall (England); 103.19	5 – 7	(Scotland) Gary Anderson; 108.22
Night's Average: 97.14
Highest Checkout: Gary Anderson 170

==== 6 March – Week 5 (Phase 1) ====
(England) Westpoint Exeter, Exeter

	Score	
Peter Wright (Scotland); 98.75	6 – 6	(Scotland) Robert Thornton; 95.23
Raymond van Barneveld (Netherlands); 87.69	6 – 6	(England) Dave Chisnall; 92.46
Adrian Lewis (England); 98.19	6 – 6	(Netherlands) Michael van Gerwen; 97.49
Phil Taylor (England); 99.91	5 – 7	(Scotland) Gary Anderson; 96.10
Simon Whitlock (Australia); 99.53	7 – 5	(Scotland) Robert Thornton*; 103.12
Night's Average: 96.85
Highest Checkout: Simon Whitlock 150

*Wes Newton was originally scheduled to play against Simon Whitlock, but was sidelined with an illness, so Robert Thornton played twice in Week 5. Newton played Whitlock on 27 March (Week 8), when Robert Thornton was given the night off.

==== 13 March – Week 6 (Phase 1) ====
(England) Nottingham Arena, Nottingham

	Score	
Simon Whitlock (Australia); 88.28	3 – 7	(Scotland) Peter Wright; 100.72
Adrian Lewis (England); 89.43	7 – 5	(Scotland) Gary Anderson; 90.62
Michael van Gerwen (Netherlands); 105.05	7 – 1	(England) Wes Newton; 103.36
Raymond van Barneveld (Netherlands); 99.46	6 – 6	(Scotland) Robert Thornton; 97.48
Phil Taylor (England); 98.46	7 – 5	(England) Dave Chisnall; 92.43
Night's Average: 96.53
Highest Checkout: Peter Wright 132

==== 20 March – Week 7 (Phase 1) ====
(England) Leeds Arena, Leeds

	Score	
Dave Chisnall (England); 96.15	6 – 6	(Australia) Simon Whitlock; 90.58
Robert Thornton (Scotland); 87.57	6 – 6	(England) Adrian Lewis; 93.62
Gary Anderson (Scotland); 99.02	5 – 7	(Netherlands) Michael van Gerwen; 102.30
Wes Newton (England); 101.17	1 – 7	(England) Phil Taylor; 106.91
Peter Wright (Scotland); 97.80	6 – 6	(Netherlands) Raymond van Barneveld; 100.81
Night's Average: 97.59
Highest Checkout: Peter Wright 161

==== 27 March – Week 8 (Phase 1) ====
(Republic of Ireland) The O_{2}, Dublin

	Score	
Gary Anderson (Scotland); 97.41	7 – 3	(England) Wes Newton; 91.45
Adrian Lewis (England); 99.14	6 – 6	(England) Dave Chisnall; 101.22
Wes Newton (England); 92.82	6 – 6	(Australia) Simon Whitlock; 91.89
Michael van Gerwen (Netherlands); 101.22	7 – 5	(Scotland) Peter Wright; 96.84
Phil Taylor (England); 96.92	6 – 6	(Netherlands) Raymond van Barneveld; 98.72
Night's Average: 96.76
Highest Checkout: Raymond van Barneveld 160

==== 3 April – Week 9 (Phase 1) ====
(Wales) Cardiff International Arena, Cardiff

	Score	
Gary Anderson (Scotland); 94.15	5 – 7	(Scotland) Peter Wright; 92.87
Michael van Gerwen (Netherlands); 103.67	6 – 6	(Australia) Simon Whitlock; 100.34
Adrian Lewis (England); 90.95	6 – 6	(Netherlands) Raymond van Barneveld; 89.43
Wes Newton (England); 88.02	5 – 7	(England) Dave Chisnall; 95.85
Phil Taylor (England); 102.48	7 – 4	(Scotland) Robert Thornton; 99.12
Night's Average: 95.69
Highest Checkout: Simon Whitlock 170

==== 10 April – Week 10 (Phase 2) ====
(England) Sheffield Arena, Sheffield

	Score	
Dave Chisnall (England); 101.29	5 – 7	(Netherlands) Raymond van Barneveld; 94.72
Peter Wright (Scotland); 98.21	4 – 7	(Scotland) Gary Anderson; 100.91
Michael van Gerwen (Netherlands); 104.31	7 – 5	(Scotland) Robert Thornton; 94.76
Phil Taylor (England); 100.96	7 – 4	(England) Adrian Lewis; 98.53
Raymond van Barneveld (Netherlands); 95.91	7 – 5	(Scotland) Peter Wright; 96.09
Night's Average: 98.57
Highest Checkout: Dave Chisnall 164

==== 17 April – Week 11 (Phase 2) ====
(Scotland) AECC, Aberdeen

	Score	
Gary Anderson (Scotland); 96.38	7 – 4	(England) Adrian Lewis; 99.44
Michael van Gerwen (Netherlands); 101.48	4 – 7	(England) Phil Taylor; 106.30
Peter Wright (Scotland); 95.72	4 – 7	(England) Dave Chisnall; 103.50
Robert Thornton (Scotland); 87.67	1 – 7	(Netherlands) Raymond van Barneveld; 99.73
Michael van Gerwen (Netherlands); 95.89	7 – 4	(England) Adrian Lewis; 95.60
Night's Average: 98.17
Highest Checkout: Gary Anderson 138

==== 24 April – Week 12 (Phase 2) ====
(England) Manchester Arena, Manchester

	Score	
Robert Thornton (Scotland); 98.16	5 – 7	(Scotland) Peter Wright; 97.71
Gary Anderson (Scotland); 98.01	6 – 6	(England) Phil Taylor; 106.65
Raymond van Barneveld (Netherlands); 104.19	7 – 3	(England) Adrian Lewis; 89.49
Michael van Gerwen (Netherlands); 99.51	7 – 4	(England) Dave Chisnall; 96.31
Gary Anderson (Scotland); 91.11	6 – 6	(Scotland) Robert Thornton; 94.49
Night's Average: 97.56
Highest Checkout: Robert Thornton 137

==== 1 May – Week 13 (Phase 2) ====
(England) National Indoor Arena, Birmingham

	Score	
Robert Thornton (Scotland); 104.30	7 – 5	(England) Dave Chisnall; 97.99
Raymond van Barneveld (Netherlands); 95.63	6 – 6	(England) Phil Taylor; 95.69
Michael van Gerwen (Netherlands); 97.48	4 – 7	(Scotland) Gary Anderson; 100.80
Adrian Lewis (England); 98.67	6 – 6	(Scotland) Peter Wright; 97.70
Dave Chisnall (England); 92.65	2 – 7	(England) Phil Taylor; 101.98
Night's Average: 98.29
Highest Checkout: Adrian Lewis 122

==== 8 May – Week 14 (Phase 2) ====
(England) Newcastle Arena, Newcastle

	Score	
Gary Anderson (Scotland); 97.90	7 – 4	(England) Dave Chisnall; 94.48
Adrian Lewis (England); 96.59	7 – 5	(Scotland) Robert Thornton; 89.25
Phil Taylor (England); 100.47	6 – 6	(Scotland) Peter Wright; 100.79
Raymond van Barneveld (Netherlands); 96.14	4 – 7	(Netherlands) Michael van Gerwen; 105.49
Night's Average: 97.64
Highest Checkout: Michael van Gerwen 132

==== 15 May – Week 15 (Phase 2) ====
(England) Brighton Centre

	Score	
Dave Chisnall (England); 92.05	4 – 7	(England) Adrian Lewis; 95.71
Gary Anderson (Scotland); 101.30	7 – 4	(Netherlands) Raymond van Barneveld; 95.65
Robert Thornton (Scotland); 95.18	5 – 7	(England) Phil Taylor; 101.29
Peter Wright (Scotland); 104.54	5 – 7	(Netherlands) Michael van Gerwen; 110.85
Night's Average: 99.57
Highest Checkout: Peter Wright 161

=== Play-offs – 22 May ===
(England) The O_{2} Arena, London

	Score	
Semi-finals (best of 15 legs)
Michael van Gerwen (Netherlands); 101.18	8 – 7	(Scotland) Gary Anderson; 99.07
Raymond van Barneveld (Netherlands); 92.27	8 – 5	(England) Phil Taylor; 93.43
Final (best of 19 legs)
Michael van Gerwen (Netherlands); 102.98	6 – 10	(Netherlands) Raymond van Barneveld; 101.93
Night's Average: 98.48
Highest Checkout: Raymond van Barneveld 116

== Table and streaks ==
=== Table ===
After the first nine weeks, the bottom two in the table were eliminated from the competition. When players are tied on points, leg difference is used first as a tie-breaker, after that legs won against throw and then tournament average.

#	Name	Pld	W	D	L	Pts	LF	LA	+/-	LWAT	100+	140+	180s	A	HC	C%
1	(Netherlands) Michael van Gerwen RU	16	11	2	3	24	102	75	+27	39	207	156	55	102.00	164	40.80%
2	(Netherlands) Raymond van Barneveld W	16	7	6	3	20	98	82	+16	32	240	122	46	97.47	160	50.52%
3	(England) Phil Taylor	16	8	4	4	20	92	80	+12	37	244	111	41	101.36	144	38.02%
4	(Scotland) Gary Anderson	16	9	2	5	20	94	82	+12	33	237	122	46	97.86	170	43.32%
5	(Scotland) Peter Wright	16	6	5	5	17	95	86	+9	34	263	137	37	97.05	161	41.48%
6	(England) Adrian Lewis	16	5	5	6	15	83	90	−7	30	200	107	54	95.34	130	38.07%
7	(England) Dave Chisnall	16	3	4	9	10	83	101	−18	31	218	140	64	96.68	164	37.73%
8	(Scotland) Robert Thornton	16	2	5	9	9	84	100	−16	26	215	125	63	94.86	137	35.00%
9	(England) Wes Newton	9	2	2	5	6	39	54	−15	15	129	48	25	93.80	149	31.71%
10	(Australia) Simon Whitlock	9	1	3	5	5	38	58	−20	13	99	62	25	92.97	170	43.18%

Last updated: 16 May 2014
Source: Match reports from the results section.

Top four qualified for the Play-offs after Week 14.
NB: LWAT = Legs Won Against Throw. A = Average C% = Checkout Percentage HC = High Checkout.

=== Streaks ===
Player	1st Phase											2nd Phase										Play-offs	
Player	1	2	3	4	5		6	7	8		9	10		11		12		13		14	15	SF	F
(Netherlands) Michael van Gerwen	W	W	W	L	D		W	W	W		D	W		L	W	W		L		W	W	W	L
(Netherlands) Raymond van Barneveld	W	L	W	W	D		D	D	D		D	W	W	W		W		D		L	L	W	W
(England) Phil Taylor	L	L	L	W	L		W	W	D		W	W		W		D		D	W	D	W	L	—N/a
(Scotland) Gary Anderson	L	W	L	W	W		L	L	W		L	W		W		D	D	W		W	W	L	—N/a
(Scotland) Peter Wright	W	D	W	W	D		W	D	L		W	L	L	L		W		D		D	L	Eliminated	
(England) Adrian Lewis	W	W	L	L	D		W	D	D		D	L		L	L	L		D		W	W	Eliminated	
(England) Dave Chisnall	W	D	L	L	D		L	D	D		W	L		W		L		L	L	L	L	Eliminated	
(Scotland) Robert Thornton	L	L	W	D	D	L	D	D	DNP		L	L		L		L	D	W		L	L	Eliminated	
(England) Wes Newton	L	W	W	D	DNP		L	L	L	D	L	Eliminated											
(Australia) Simon Whitlock	L	L	L	L	W		L	D	D		D	Eliminated											

Legend:	W	Win	D	Draw	L	Loss	DNP	Did not play	—N/a	Eliminated

=== Positions by round ===
Player	Round														
Player	1	2	3	4	5	6	7	8	9	10	11	12	13	14	15
(Netherlands) Michael van Gerwen	1	2	1	2	2	2	1	1	1	1	1	1	1	1	1
(Netherlands) Raymond van Barneveld	3	5	3	3	3	3	3	3	3	2	2	2	2	2	2
(England) Phil Taylor	10	9	9	9	9	9	6	6	5	4	4	4	3	3	3
(Scotland) Gary Anderson	7	6	8	6	4	5	7	5	7	5	5	5	5	4	4
(Scotland) Peter Wright	4	3	2	1	1	1	2	2	2	3	3	3	4	5	5
(England) Adrian Lewis	2	1	4	5	6	4	4	4	4	6	7	7	6	6	6
(England) Dave Chisnall	5	4	6	8	8	8	8	8	6	7	6	6	7	7	7
(Scotland) Robert Thornton	6	8	7	7	7	6	5	7	8	8	8	8	8	8	8
(England) Wes Newton	8	7	5	4	5	7	9	9	9	Eliminated					
(Australia) Simon Whitlock	9	10	10	10	10	10	10	10	10	Eliminated					
