= 2007 Masters of Darts =

Dutch dart tournament stage

2007 Keukenconcurrent Masters of Darts

Tournament information
- Dates: 10 – 18 February 2007
- Venue: ExpoCenter
- Location: Hengelo
- Country: Netherlands
- Organisation(s): PDC / BDO
- Format: Sets; Final – best of 13
- Prize fund: €395,000
- Winner's share: €150,000

Champion(s)
- Raymond van Barneveld

The 2007 Keukenconcurrent Masters of Darts was the second staging of a Dutch darts tournament featuring five top Dutch and five top English players.

The event witnessed a nine dart finish by Dutch teenager Michael van Gerwen, who became the youngest player to achieve the feat on television, aged 17 years and 298 days. Van Gerwen held the record until it was broken by 16-year-old Luke Littler at the 2024 Bahrain Darts Masters. Although the English players won the majority of the matches to clinch the team tournament 15–10, the singles title was won by a Dutchman, Raymond van Barneveld.

== Sponsor and venue ==
The tournament was sponsored by Keukenconcurrent, a Dutch kitchen manufacturing company – who also sponsored many of the top Dutch players. The tournament was held at the Expo Center Hengelo (ECH), a multi functional trade and events centre in Hengelo, Netherlands.

== Format ==
The inaugural event in 2005 featured an historic first tournament between players from the BDO and the PDC. This time around the Masters featured an England v the Netherlands clash. At time the tournament details were announced, there were 4 BDO players, 5 PDC players and one unnamed wildcard. Shortly after the 2007 BDO World Championship, the four BDO players (van Gerwen, King, Klaasen and van der Voort) had all announced they were switching to the PDC. So by the time of the 2007 event, all the players in the event were PDC players.

The tournament was again arranged by PenH Events, but SBS6 had taken over the contract to cover the event from RTL5, who broadcast the 2005 event. Sky Sports showed highlights of the tournament on 16 July 2007. It was staged between February 10 and February 18, 2007. The Dutch squad consisted of Raymond van Barneveld, Roland Scholten, Vincent van der Voort, Jelle Klaasen and Michael van Gerwen. The England squad was Phil Taylor, Colin Lloyd, Wayne Mardle, Mervyn King and Peter Manley. The players competed in a round-robin format from Saturday to Wednesday.

There was no play on Thursday and Friday due to the Holsten Premier League Darts, and the top two players from each country faced off in Saturday's semi-finals. The semi-finals saw the top two Dutch players face each other and the top two English players battling for a place in Sunday's final for the first prize of €50,000. The total prize fund was €185,000.

== Results and review ==
Saturday 10 February, 19:00 UTC (Best of 5 sets)

Klaasen 0–3 King
van Gerwen 3-0 Taylor
van Barneveld 2–3 Manley
van der Voort 0–3 Mardle
Scholten 0–3 Lloyd

Michael van Gerwen produced a superb victory over 13 times World Champion Phil Taylor and was the only Dutchman with a success on the opening day. It was a convincing looking victory by 3 sets to 0 but all three sets went to a deciding leg which van Gerwen took with 14, 12 and 12 dart legs respectively. Van Gerwen took out 170 to clinch the second set and also included a 10 dart leg in the third set hitting 180, 133, 180 and double 4 to put himself within one leg of the match. He finished the match with a 164 checkout for the 3–0 win.

Another surprise came when Peter Manley beat current World Champion Raymond van Barneveld. Manley took the first set with a 130 checkout in the decider and some steady scoring put him 2-0 up before van Barneveld started a comeback with seven successive legs. Van Barneveld was just one leg from victory but missed darts for the match in the fourth leg. Manley took the next three legs to win the final set 4-2 in the tie-break.

Sunday 11 February, 19:00 UTC (Best of 5 sets)

Scholten 1–3 Taylor
van Barneveld 2–3 King
van Gerwen 3-1 Mardle
Klaasen 3–2 Lloyd
van der Voort 2–3 Manley

Raymond van Barneveld slumped to his second successive defeat in the tournament, and Phil Taylor notched up his first win of 2007 after two draws and two defeats during the year to date. Michael van Gerwen, Mervyn King and Peter Manley maintained their 100% records and Jelle Klaasen got off the mark with his first victory of the tournament. England players extend their lead to 7–3 in match victories, although it is an individual competition with the top two from each nation who progress to the semi-finals.

Monday 12 February, 19:00 UTC (Best of 5 sets)

van Gerwen 2–3 Lloyd (after sudden death leg)
van Barneveld 3-0 Taylor
van der Voort 0–3 King
Scholten 0–3 Mardle
Klaasen 2–3 Manley

Phil Taylor's miserable form continued with another defeat by Raymond van Barneveld, who finally got off the mark with his first win of the tournament. Peter Manley and Mervyn King maintained their 100% records, which puts Taylor in danger of failing to qualify for the semi-finals. Colin Lloyd notched his second win of the tournament with a thrilling victory over Michael van Gerwen (previously 100%). The match went to a sudden death leg after reaching 5–5 in the final set. Wayne Mardle is still in contention with his second win. England have now won 11 matches to the Netherlands 4.

Tuesday 13 February, 19:00 UTC (Best of 5 sets)

van Gerwen 3–2 King
van Barneveld 3-0 Mardle
Klaasen 1–3 Taylor
Scholten 1–3 Manley
van der Voort 0–3 Lloyd

Despite a win over Jelle Klaasen, Phil Taylor can no longer qualify for the semi-finals. Peter Manley remained 100% with a victory over Roland Scholten, but the other 100% record went as Mervyn King lost to Michael van Gerwen. King hit eight 180s and checked out a 170 finish but it wasn't enough to beat van Gerwen whose victory was enough to secure a semi-final place. Despite only his second win, Raymond van Barneveld also guarantees a semi-final spot with a 3–0 win over Wayne Mardle. With Manley already assured a semi-final place, its down to King, Lloyd and Mardle to battle it out for the final place in the last four. England had an unassailable lead of 14–6 in the team aspect of the tournament.

Wednesday 14 February, 19:00 UTC (Best of 5 sets)

van Gerwen 2–3 Manley
van Barneveld 3–0 Lloyd
van der Voort 3–1 Taylor
Klaasen 3–0 Mardle
Scholten 3–2 King

The group stages ended with a day of success for the Dutch. Only Michael van Gerwen failed to notch a win for the Netherlands as he lost the opening match of the night to Peter Manley. Manley completed a clean sweep of victories over all five Dutch players, for a significant achievement. Raymond van Barneveld now needed a victory to win the Dutch group and he obliged with a 3–0 win over Colin Lloyd, virtually ending his qualifying hopes. Phil Taylor's dead rubber against Vincent van der Voort ended in defeat, his third of the tournament. Taylor would have the ignominy of finishing bottom of the England group. Wayne Mardle's faint hopes of qualifying vanished with a 0–3 loss to Jelle Klaasen leaving Mervyn King needing just a set against Roland Scholten to go through to the semi-finals. King achieved qualification but blew a 2–0 lead to lose the match 2–3.

=== Standings ===
All group matches are best of five sets.
The top two in each group qualify for the knock-out stage.

NB: P = Played; W = Won; L = Lost; SW = Sets won; SL = Sets lost; +/− = Plus/minus record, in relation to sets; Pts = Points; Status = Qualified to knockout stage

==== Netherlands Group ====
Pos.	Player	W	L	SW	SL	+/−	Status
1	Raymond van Barneveld	3	2	13	6	+7	Q
2	Michael van Gerwen	3	2	13	9	+4	Q
3	Jelle Klaasen	2	3	9	11	-2	Eliminated
4	Vincent van der Voort	1	4	5	13	-8	Eliminated
5	Roland Scholten	1	4	5	14	-9	Eliminated

==== England Group ====
Pos.	Player	W	L	SW	SL	+/−	Status
1	Peter Manley	5	0	15	9	+6	Q
2	Mervyn King	3	2	13	8	+5	Q
3	Colin Lloyd	3	2	11	8	+3	Eliminated
4	Wayne Mardle	2	3	7	9	-2	Eliminated
5	Phil Taylor	2	3	7	11	-4	Eliminated

Thursday & Friday – rest days

=== Semi-finals ===
Saturday 17 February, 17:00 UTC (Best of 11 sets)

(England) Peter Manley 95.01 6–5 (England) Mervyn King 96.52

(0–3, 3–1, 2–3, 3–1, 1–3, 1–3, 3–1, 1–3, 3–2, 3–2, 3–1)

(Netherlands) Raymond van Barneveld 101.77 6–4 (Netherlands) Michael van Gerwen 104.23

(3–0, 3–1, 1–3, 3–0, 1–3, 2–3, 1–3, 3–0, 3–2, 3–1)

Michael van Gerwen achieved a perfect nine dart finish during his defeat by Raymond van Barneveld. van Gerwen became the youngest player to achieve a televised nine-darter, as the event was broadcast live in the Netherlands. His achievement came in the second leg of the fifth set, when trailing 1–3. He took an unconventional route to the nine-darter scoring 174, 180 then finishing 147 with T20, T17, D18. However, he let a 4–3 lead slip and lost the match despite a 104.23 average and fourteen 180s. van Barneveld himself averaged 101.77 and hit eleven 180s to win a dramatic contest.

Earlier in the evening, Peter Manley produced one of his best comebacks to beat Mervyn King 6-5. Manley trailed 3–5 in sets and was just one leg away from defeat at 0–2 in the ninth set. Three successive ton-plus finishes kept him in the match. King missed a dart to win the match in the tenth set, before Manley took it into a decider.

King took the first leg of the deciding set, before Manley levelled. A 70 checkout in the third set against the darts was the decisive moment for Manley and he held out with a double eight in the fourth leg to clinch his final place.

=== Final ===
Sunday 18 February, 19:00 UTC (Best of 13 sets)

(Netherlands) Raymond van Barneveld 107.90 7–0 (England) Peter Manley 94.66
(3–0, 3–2, 3–2, 3–0, 3–1, 3–2, 3–0)

The final was a one-sided affair as Raymond van Barneveld ended Peter Manley's 100% record with a convincing 7–0 victory to take the title. Manley missed four darts to take the second set and level the match but after that was never really in the contest. van Barneveld produced a superb performance averaging almost 108, hitting 60% of his doubles and scored fourteen maximum 180s to dominate the match.

== See also ==
- Masters of Darts history of the tournament
