= World Darts Challenge =

The World Darts Challenge was a two-man team darts tournament organised by the Professional Darts Corporation held in 2007 in the United States at the Mohegan Sun.

The tournament featured the top two ranked PDC players, Phil Taylor and Raymond van Barneveld, partnering the top two American players, Ray Carver and John Kuczynski, and was won by the team of van Barneveld and Kuczynski.

== Format ==
The two teams were:

- (England) Phil Taylor and (United States) Ray Carver
- (Netherlands) Raymond van Barneveld and (United States) John Kuczynski

Each match was played the best of five legs with all legs being played. Teams earned one point for each leg won in a race to 13 points.

Singles Matches

(England) Phil Taylor 4–1 (United States) John Kuczynski

(United States) Ray Carver 1–4 (Netherlands) Raymond van Barneveld

(United States) Ray Carver 2–3 (United States) John Kuczynski

(England) Phil Taylor 1–4 (Netherlands) Raymond van Barneveld

Doubles match

(England) Phil Taylor and (United States) Ray Carver 3–2 (Netherlands) Raymond van Barneveld and (United States) John Kuczynski

Final score

(England) Phil Taylor and (United States) Ray Carver 11–14 (Netherlands) Raymond van Barneveld and (United States) John Kuczynski
