= Raymond van Barneveld =

Dutch darts player (born 1967)

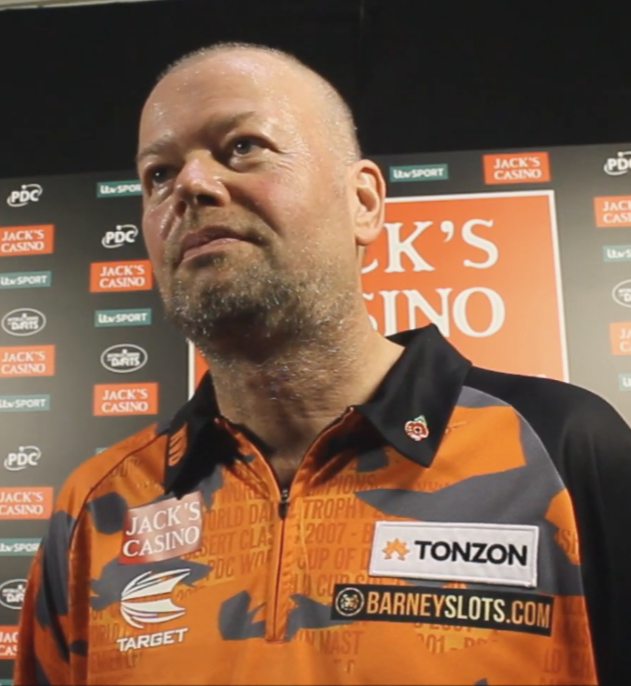
- Van Barneveld in 2019

Personal information
- Nickname: "Barney"
- Born: 20 April 1967 (age 59) The Hague, Netherlands

Sport
- Sport: Darts
- Playing since: 1984
- Darts: 25g Target Signature
- Laterality: Right-handed
- Walk-on music: "Eye of the Tiger" by Survivor

Organisation (see split in darts)
- BDO: 1987–2006
- PDC: 2006–2019; 2021–present (Tour Card: 2011–2019; 2021–)
- Current world ranking: (PDC) 47 ▲2 (5 November 2026)

WDF major events – best performances
- World Championship: Winner (4): 1998, 1999, 2003, 2005
- World Masters: Winner (2): 2001, 2005
- World Trophy: Winner (2): 2003, 2004
- Int. Darts League: Winner (3): 2003, 2004, 2006
- Finder Masters: Winner (4): 1995, 2001, 2003, 2004
- Dutch Open: Winner (3): 2001, 2004, 2006

PDC premier events – best performances
- World Championship: Winner (1): 2007
- World Matchplay: Runner-up: 2010
- World Grand Prix: Runner-up: 2008, 2009
- UK Open: Winner (2): 2006, 2007
- Grand Slam: Winner (1): 2012
- European Championship: Semi-final: 2011, 2014
- Premier League: Winner (1): 2014
- Desert Classic: Winner (1): 2007
- US Open/WSoD: Runner-up: 2007
- PC Finals: Quarter-final: 2009, 2013, 2016, 2019
- Masters: Runner-up: 2015, 2018
- Champions League: Semi-final: 2017
- World Series Finals: Semi-final: 2018

WSDT major events – best performances
- Champions: Semi-final: 2025

Other tournament wins
- Years
World Cup of Darts (team event)	2010, 2014, 2017, 2018
Masters of Darts	2007
WDF World Cup Singles	1997, 1999, 2003
WDF Europe Cup Singles	2004
World Team Championship	1997
WDF Europe Cup Pairs	2000, 2004
WDF World Cup Pairs	2005
World Darts Challenge	2007
European Tour Events
European Darts Open	2012
Players Championships (×10)
2006, 2007 (×4), 2008, 2011, 2013, 2021, 2024
UK Open Regionals/Qualifiers (×7)
2006, 2007 (×3), 2008, 2012 (×2)

Other achievements
- 1998 BDO Personality Award 1999 Major citizen of The Hague 1999 Named in the Order of Orange-Nassau 2003 I.D.P.A. Leighton Rees Men's Player of the Year Award 2006 PDC Best Newcomer 2006 PDC Fans' Player of the Year 2008 PDC Best Floor Player
- Updated on 3 June 2018

Raymond van Barneveld (born 20 April 1967) is a Dutch professional darts player who competes in Professional Darts Corporation (PDC) events, where he was ranked world number one from January 2008 to June 2008. Nicknamed "Barney", he is widely regarded as one of the sport's greatest ever players and is credited with the sport's rise in popularity in the Netherlands. He is a five-time world champion, with four BDO and one PDC world titles, one of only three players to achieve this.

In addition to his five world titles, van Barneveld is also a two-time UK Open champion, and a former winner of the Las Vegas Desert Classic, the Grand Slam and the Premier League. He is also a two-time World Masters winner, and a former World Darts Trophy champion. He is a three-time winner of both the International Darts League, the Dutch Open, and the WDF World Cup singles event. van Barneveld has won the PDC World Cup of Darts four times and the WDF World Cup Pairs once. Naturally left-handed, van Barneveld throws with his right hand.

In November 2018, van Barneveld announced his intention to retire from darts after the 2020 PDC World Darts Championship. On 28 March 2019, following a 7–1 defeat to Michael van Gerwen in his final Premier League match, he announced his retirement with immediate effect, but reversed his decision the following day. He retired again following his first-round exit at the 2020 World Championship. In February 2021, 14 months after retiring, he regained his professional tour card after qualifying at 2021 PDC Qualifying School.

== BDO career ==
=== 1984–1990: Early career ===
Van Barneveld began participating in competitive events around the Netherlands since 1984 when he was 17 years old. During that year he won his first tournament, which was the Rotterdam Open. From there onwards, Van Barneveld was considered among his compatriots as a future potential. In the following years he joined the international darts circuit, achieving further success reaching the semi-finals of the 1987 Belgian Open, and reaching the semi-finals in the 1988 Dutch Open. In September 1990, he participated in the WDF Europe Cup singles where he lost in the quarter-finals to Phil Taylor.

=== 1991–1997: First World final ===
Van Barneveld's World Championship debut was at the 1991 Embassy World Championship at the Lakeside Country Club, however had little impact losing 3–0 in the last 32, to Keith Sullivan of Australia. He started to make some progress on the British Darts Organisation circuit in the early 1990s, reaching the quarter-finals of the Belgian Open in September 1990, and the German Open in March 1991. His first semi-final came at the Swiss Open in June 1991.

He returned to Lakeside in 1993, which would be the last time that a unified World Championship would be staged. Van Barneveld served notice of his potential when he hit a 170 checkout to go 2 sets to 1 in front against John Lowe during their second-round match, but Lowe came back to win the match 3–2, and go on to win the title. Shortly after the 1993 World Final, the top players in the World Darts Council (WDC, now the PDC) were suspended and later banned from BDO tournaments.

In 1994, he reached the quarter-finals of both Dutch Open and Berlin Open, the semi-final at the Belgium Open and his first and the Finnish Open, where he lost to Andy Fordham. He continued his good run of form into the 1995 World Championship by beating Les Wallace, Dave Askew, Colin Monk and Martin Adams to reach his first World Final. Van Barneveld's run to the final would eventually come to an end as he was defeated 6–3 by Welshman Richie Burnett.

=== 1998–2006: Four World titles ===
After second round exits in 1996 and 1997 Championships, Van Barneveld claimed his first world title in the 1998 World Championship, in a World Final grudge match meeting against Richie Burnett. This time Van Barneveld was the victor, edging Burnett 6–5 in a game which is often considered to be one of the greatest finals of all time having reached 5–5 in sets Van Barneveld finally took the title by winning the final set 4–2 in legs on double 8.

He successfully defended the trophy the year later by the same winning margin as the previous year, this time against Ronnie Baxter. This made him only the second player in the tournament's history to have launched a successful defence of his title; the other being Eric Bristow. Martin Adams and Glen Durrant would later also achieve this feat. In November 1999, Van Barneveld, the then 2-time reigning Lakeside World Champion, took on Phil Taylor, the then 7-time World Champion and reigning PDC world champion, at the Wembley Conference Centre. It was a legs match with a 60-minute clock ticking down to zero, with a short break at around the halfway stage. Van Barneveld lost the match 21–10.

Van Barneveld exited in the first round of the World Championships in 2000, crashing out to Chris Mason, who averaged 100 and ended Van Barneveld's hopes of a hat-trick of titles, as well as avenging a semi final loss from the previous year.

Van Barneveld lost in the quarter-finals in 2001 (5–4 to Ted Hankey) and 2002 (5–3 to Mervyn King) before returning to the final in 2003. He clinched his third world title by beating Ritchie Davies of Wales 6–3.

Van Barneveld's 2004 campaign ended in the semi-finals, when Andy Fordham recovered from being 3–0 and 4–2 behind, to beat Van Barneveld 5–4. A fourth title followed in 2005. He never dropped a set in the first three rounds as he beat Gary Anderson, Mike Veitch and Vincent van der Voort. A 5–3 semi-final win over Darryl Fitton and 6–2 triumph over Martin Adams of England in the final brought him that fourth title.

Van Barneveld reached his sixth final in 2006, and was aiming to equal Bristow's record of five BDO world titles. However, his opponent, 21-year-old fellow countryman Jelle Klaasen, prevailed 7–5.

He has also won the prestigious Winmau World Masters title twice: once in 2001 when he recorded a win in the final over Jarkko Komula of Finland and again in 2005 when he beat Göran Klemme in the final. Other major darts tournaments that he has won at least twice include The World Darts Trophy and The International Darts League.

== PDC career ==
=== Switch to PDC ===
After playing in the BDO for twenty years, winning four World Championships, Van Barneveld announced his move from the BDO to the PDC on 15 February 2006. He cited his reasons as wanting a greater challenge, and regularly playing against players like Phil Taylor. Having started from scratch in the rankings, within twelve months he had reached world number two and became World Champion.

=== 2006 season: UK Open title ===
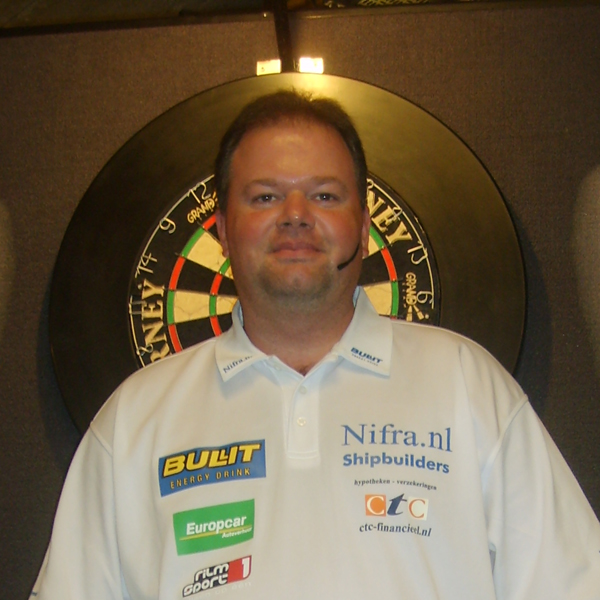
Van Barneveld in 2006

His PDC debut came in the 2006 Premier League competition. He won his first match 8–1 against Baxter. On 23 March, he hit his first televised nine dart finish and faced Taylor later in the same night, fighting back for a 7–7 draw. The rematch came on Van Barneveld's 39th birthday, but this time Taylor won the deciding leg for an 8–6 victory. Van Barneveld lost in a surprise 11–3 semi-final defeat in the Premier League to fellow Dutchman Roland Scholten.

Van Barneveld then started a successful run with a 13–5 final victory over Colin Lloyd in the final of the International Darts League for his 11th BDO Grand Slam tournament. He won his first major PDC title in June by beating Barrie Bates in the final of the UK Open at the Reebok Stadium, Bolton. Earlier in the day, he beat Taylor in the quarter-finals, accomplishing one of his dreams which he announced after switching to the PDC. Van Barneveld beat Taylor again just weeks later in the semi-finals of the 2006 Las Vegas Desert Classic. He lost 6–3 to Canadian John Part in the final the following day.

In September 2006, soon after losing to 17-year-old Michael van Gerwen in the first round of the 2006 World Darts Trophy, Van Barneveld acknowledged that he needed to work on his finishing throws, and he made alterations to his game. He changed his darts and began using the "stacking" technique used by Taylor. The darts used were a gram lighter than his old ones and cost the equivalent of £1 from a local store in the Netherlands. Although he played well in the 2006 World Grand Prix, he lost to Phil Taylor in the second round.

=== 2007 season: 5th World title ===
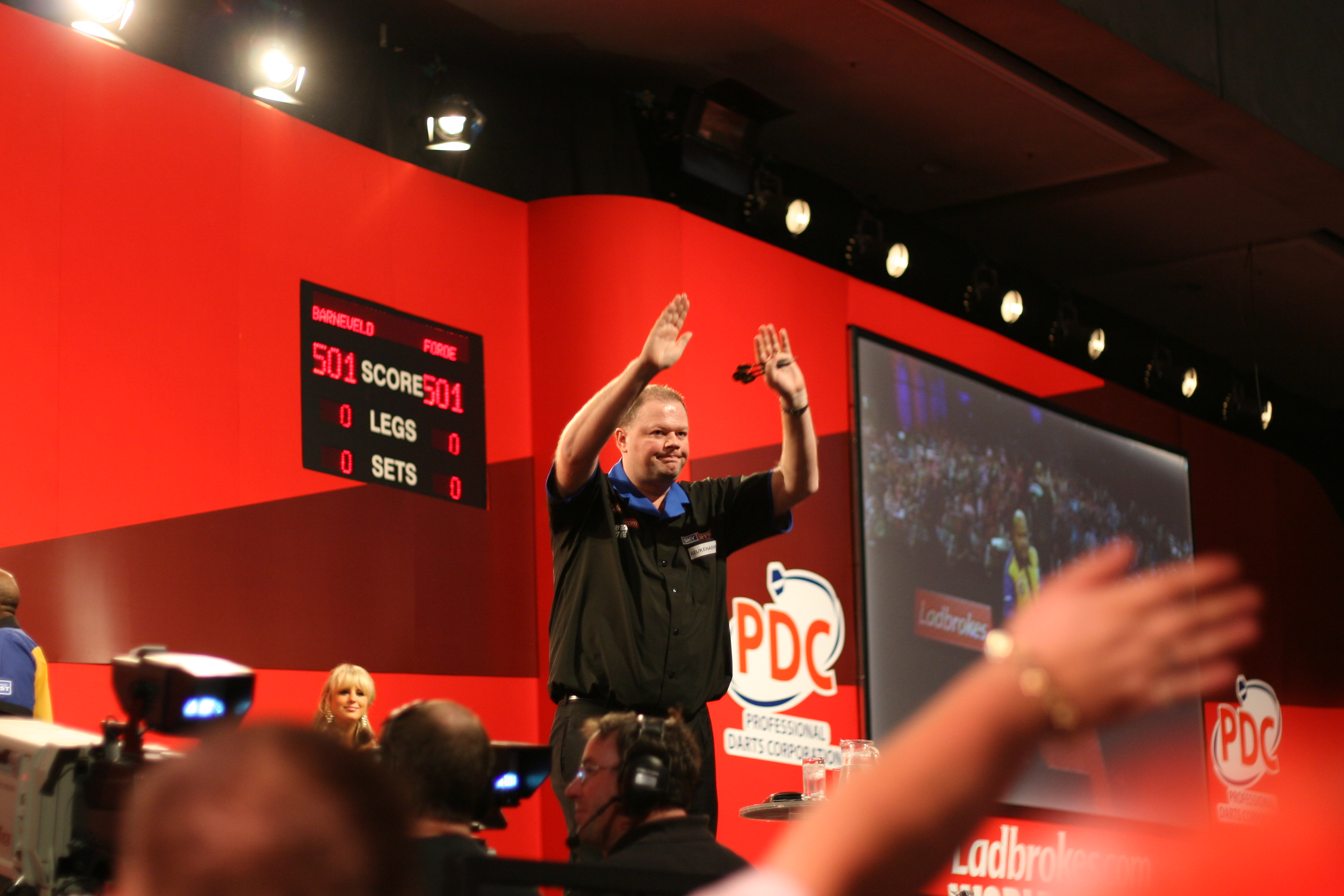
Van Barneveld in 2007

Taylor and Van Barneveld met again in the 2007 PDC World Championship final, in a match which Taylor later described as the best final he had been involved in. From three sets down, Van Barneveld came back to beat Taylor 7–6 in the sudden death leg in one of the greatest darts matches of all time to match Bristow's record of five world titles. In February 2007, Van Barneveld won the 2007 Masters of Darts tournament by beating Peter Manley 7–0 in sets in the final with a 107 three dart average.

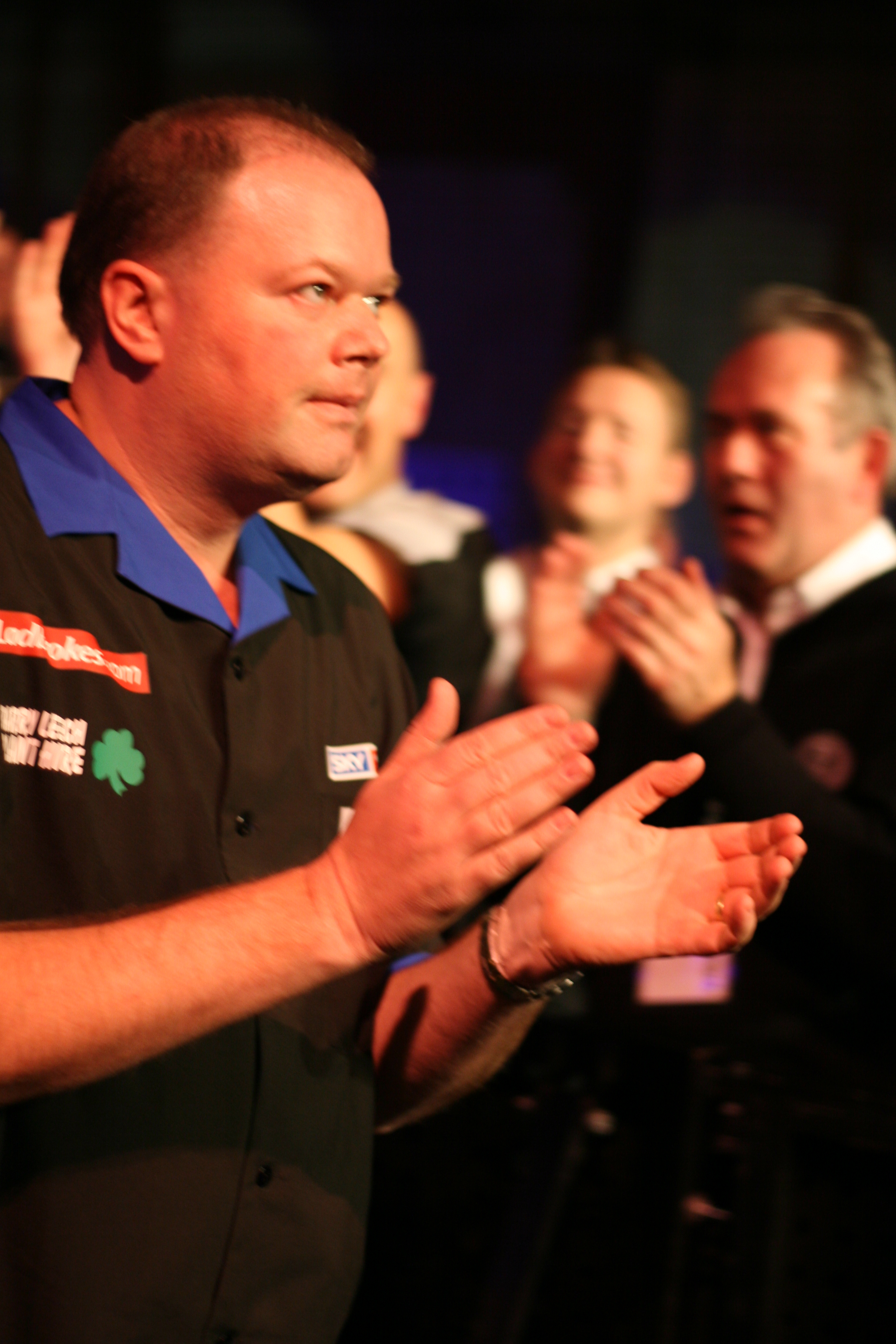
van Barneveld walking on in 2007

In the 2007 Premier League Darts, he never fared as well as he did in 2006, losing to Taylor twice, Dennis Priestley and Lloyd in the group section. He finished second but lost an error-filled encounter 11–10 to Terry Jenkins in the semi-final, having come from 6–10 behind and missed five darts to reach the final.

Van Barneveld made amends for his Premier League campaign by inflicting one of Taylor's heaviest defeats (11–4) in the quarter-final of the 2007 UK Open and went on to successfully defend his title beating Lloyd 11–4 in the semi-final and Van der Voort in the final 16–8. In doing this, Van Barneveld became the first person to successfully defend the UK Open crown. A month later, he continued his surge of major titles by beating Terry Jenkins 13 legs to 6 in the final of the 2007 Las Vegas Desert Classic. Van Barneveld's dream of winning the five major ranking PDC tournament titles in 2007 – the World Championship, UK Open, Las Vegas Desert Classic, World Matchplay and the World Grand Prix ended when he was defeated by Adrian Lewis 16 legs to 14 in the quarter-finals of the World Matchplay in Blackpool.

His haul of titles in the PDC continued to grow since his switch. In addition to his five major titles (the World Championship, two UK Open Championships, the Vegas Desert Classic, and the Masters of Darts) – he has added eleven non-televised PDC Pro Tour titles (five UK Open Regionals and six Players Championships).

=== 2008 season ===
2008 proved to be Van Barneveld's most barren year thus far in the PDC in terms of success, with him not winning a major tournament. His defence of the World Championship crown was seriously thwarted by a bout of flu. He managed to win his first two matches comfortably, although he nearly had to retire during his second-round match due to breathing problems. He was defeated by Kevin Painter in the 3rd round by 4 sets to 2. Following this, he reached the semi-finals of the 2008 Premier League Darts, but was defeated for the third consecutive year at this stage of the tournament, defeated by James Wade. He was also knocked out of the early stages of the US Open, the Las Vegas Desert Classic by Alan Tabern and in the semi-finals of the UK Open by Gary Mawson, after having defeated rival Taylor by 10 legs to 9 a round earlier. He was also defeated in the quarter-finals of the World Matchplay by Wayne Mardle, despite leading 12 legs to 7 at one stage. However, Van Barneveld did regain some form in the World Grand Prix reaching the final of the tournament, before being defeated by Taylor by 6 sets to 2. He then lost to Lewis in the quarter-finals of the inaugural European Darts Championship in November losing by 9 legs to 2.

=== 2009 season: 8th World final ===
Van Barneveld threw another televised Nine-dart finish in the 2009 World Championship in his quarter-final match against fellow Dutchman Klaasen on 2 January 2009. Van Barneveld hit two maximum 180s before nailing treble 20, treble 19 and double 12 to complete his nine-darter in the second leg of the sixth set. The feat earned Van Barneveld £20,000 – the bonus had not been won since Taylor's nine-darter at the UK Open against Jamie Harvey – as he became the first player to throw a perfect leg in the PDC World Championship. Van Barneveld went on to win the match 5–1, with a 161 finish, and then won his semi-final against Wade. However, he lost 7–1 to Taylor in the final. As a result of his failure to defend the £100,000 he won at the 2007 World Championship (his runner-up position earned him £60,000) he dropped from 2nd to 3rd in the PDC Order of Merit.

Van Barneveld threw his fourth nine dart finish in the Blue Square UK Open West Midlands Regional on 29 March 2009 in the third round against Kirk Shepherd. Barney only earned £400 for this as Mervyn King snapped up the £4,000 bonus on 28 March 2009 at the Coventry Players Championship with a nine dart finish.

In the 2009 Las Vegas Desert Classic, Barney returned to form, losing narrowly to Phil Taylor 13–11 in the final. After the game, Barney took the microphone from Sky Sports presenter Dave Clark and gave a speech about Phil Taylor.

After his quarter final World Matchplay defeat by Terry Jenkins, Van Barneveld took another sabbatical from darts. He declined entries for the Championship of Darts and the South African Masters. There was speculation Van Barneveld was considering retiring from the sport, but he stated after his first-round win in the 2009 World Grand Prix over Alan Tabern that he was suffering from diabetes and his absence was in order to get fit and healthy and going to the gym. He also attributed the diabetes towards his form in major tournaments. Van Barneveld reached the World Grand Prix final for the second successive year, but again lost to Taylor, this time by 6 sets to 3.

On 28 December 2009, he hit another nine-darter in the second round of the PDC World Championship against Brendan Dolan, becoming the first player to hit two nine-dart finishes in the PDC World Championship. He went on to reach the semi-finals before losing 6–5 to Simon Whitlock. He also lost the third-place play-off 10–8 in legs to Mark Webster.

=== 2010 season ===
In the 2010 World Championship, Simon Whitlock defeated Van Barneveld 6–5 in a close semi final encounter.

On 29 April 2010, Van Barneveld hit another nine-darter against Terry Jenkins at the 2010 Whyte & Mackay Premier League Darts in Aberdeen. This came during a poor Premier League campaign in which he only finished in sixth place. During the Premier League, Barney said that he was suffering from personal problems back home and claimed that he and his family were being blackmailed. He failed to qualify for the 2010 UK Open, having only entered one of the eight qualifying events (only players who entered three or more events were eligible to qualify).

Van Barneveld returned to top form at the 2010 World Matchplay. In the first round against Denis Ovens on 17 July 2010, Van Barneveld hit another nine-darter. After then defeating Alan Tabern and Co Stompé, Van Barneveld defeated former World Matchplay champion, James Wade, by 17–8 in the semi-final. In the final, Phil Taylor defeated Van Barneveld 18–12.

=== 2011 season ===
At the 2011 World Championship, he lost in the quarter-finals to an in form Gary Anderson.

The 2011 Premier League saw a slight return of form after he hit 4 100+ finishes and defeated Simon Whitlock 8–3 with a 100.15 average. He went on to win his next match against Adrian Lewis 8–6, before losing to Phil Taylor in their match, 8–3. In week 6, he defeated Mark Webster 8–4 with a high average of 100.98 and also hit a 161 checkout. He went on to defeat Gary Anderson 8–5 in week 7 with an average of 101.44. Van Barneveld finished the league phase in second place behind Taylor, but then lost in the semi-final to Anderson, which was the fifth time in six years that Van Barneveld had reached the Premier League semi finals without getting into the final.

The 2011 UK Open saw Barneveld progress to the fifth round of the competition where he was defeated 9–1 by an on form Wes Newton who was eventual runner-up.

On the day of his first-round match in the 2011 World Matchplay Barney lost his darts. He contacted his sponsors with a S.O.S which meant they had to contact the closest supplier to deliver a new set for him. He received the set with no problems and used them to defeat Steve Brown 10–3 averaging 95.56.

=== 2012 season: Grand Slam of Darts win ===
Van Barneveld was the victim of one of the biggest upsets in PDC World Championship history in 2012. He lost 0–3 in the first round to world number 85, James Richardson, winning just four legs during the match. He teamed up with Vincent van der Voort for the 2012 PDC World Cup of Darts to try to defend the title Van Barneveld won with Co Stompé in 2010. Together they enjoyed comfortable victories over Austria and Northern Ireland to set up a semi-final clash with the Australian pair of Paul Nicholson and Simon Whitlock. Van Barneveld beat Nicholson 4–0 in their singles match, but this was the only point the Dutch won as they relinquished their crown in a 5–1 defeat.

Van Barneveld was a Sky Sports pick for the Premier League. During the tournament he produced his then highest ever televised average of 112.28 whilst defeating Kevin Painter 8–6. He went into the final round of matches knowing a win over James Wade would secure him a place in the play-offs, but could only manage to draw the match 7–7 to finish 5th in the table, out of the play-off places on leg difference.

Van Barneveld won the UK Open Qualifier 5 by beating Andy Smith 6–3 in the final, after earlier overcoming Simon Whitlock and Terry Jenkins. He also hit a nine-dart finish in his third round match against Michael Barnard. He completed a weekend double by winning Event 6 a day later after defeating Ian White 6–2 in the final. In the UK Open itself, he beat Jelle Klaasen and Andy Hamilton to reach the last 16. In this match he played Peter Wright and looked to be exiting the tournament as Van Barneveld trailed 8–6, with his opponent on a 138 finish to win the match. Wright hit treble 20, single 18 and required a single 20 to leave double tops when he returned. However, he hit another treble 20 to bust his score, and Van Barneveld went on to take a 9–8 victory. He played Dave Chisnall in the quarter-finals and never recovered from a poor start in which he lost the opening five legs and succumbed 10–5. However, Van Barneveld gained revenge over Chisnall in the final of the European Tour Event 3 in Düsseldorf, by defeating him 6–4 and claimed his first European Tour title.

At the World Matchplay Van Barneveld lost to Terry Jenkins 13–10 in the last 16. In September, he broke his highest televised average for the second time this year by averaging 113.04 in a 6–1 win against Jenkins at the European Championship. He went on to the quarter-finals, where he lost 10–8 to Kim Huybrechts.

In November 2012, Van Barneveld won his first major tournament in over five years at the non-ranking Grand Slam of Darts. He beat Mark Walsh 5–0 in his first group match, before losing 5–4 to BDO World Champion Christian Kist in his second. However, a 5–2 win over Wayne Jones from 2–0 down was enough to see him qualify for the knockout stage, where he defeated fellow Dutchman Wesley Harms 10–4 in the last 16, avenged his earlier loss to Kist in the quarter-finals by winning 16–10, and beat Andy Hamilton 16–10 in the semi-finals to set up an all-Dutch clash with Grand Prix champion Michael van Gerwen. Van Barneveld was never behind in the final and although he missed three chances to win 16–13, he sealed the title in the following leg with an 11-darter against the throw. His win was later named the best PDC Televised Performance of the Year.

After all 33 ProTour events of 2012 had been played, Van Barneveld finished fourth on the Order of Merit to qualify for the Players Championship Finals where he lost 6–5 to Steve Beaton in the first round.

=== 2013 season ===
Van Barneveld began the 2013 World Championship by throwing the sixth highest average in the history of the tournament in his first round 3–0 defeat of Michael Smith. In a match that lasted only 18 minutes he averaged 108.31 as he never looked in danger of exiting the tournament at the first hurdle for the second successive year. He beat Brendan Dolan 4–1, Gary Anderson 4–0 and Simon Whitlock 5–1 to reach the semi-finals where he faced Phil Taylor.

Before the match Van Barneveld commented that he wasn't scared of Taylor and wanted to face him rather than Taylor's quarter-final opponent Andy Hamilton. Van Barneveld was 5–1 down in the match and almost staged a fightback as he won three successive sets to trail only 5–4. However, Taylor won the next set by three legs to one to take the match. The pair were involved in an angry confrontation after the match. Taylor reacted angrily when Van Barneveld pulled him back after their handshake, with both men being escorted away separately by security staff. Van Barneveld stated later that he was only trying to congratulate Taylor in a sportsmanlike way and give him a hug. Taylor apologised for his behaviour a day later.

In his third World Cup of Darts and first with Michael van Gerwen, the Dutch pair suffered a shock in the last 16 when they were beaten 5–3 by the Finnish duo of Jani Haavisto and Jarkko Komula. Van Barneveld was never out of the top four in the Premier League during all 14 weeks of the league phase. He won 10 out of his 16 games to finish second in the table which set up a semi-final meeting with Taylor against whom he had lost 7–3 and drawn with 6–6 in their two league clashes. From level at 3–3 in the semi-final, Taylor stormed away to win 8–4 to deny Van Barneveld his first Premier League final. Van Barneveld reached the final of the non-ranking Dubai Masters thanks to 10–6 and 11–5 wins over Adrian Lewis and James Wade. He faced Van Gerwen and was beaten 7–11. Van Barneveld defeated defending champion Robert Thornton in the last 16 of the 2013 UK Open and survived one match dart from Ronnie Baxter in the quarter-finals to win 10–9. His semi-final against Andy Hamilton went into a last leg decider, with Van Barneveld missing a total of six darts for the match to lose 10–9. He lost in the second round of the European Championship and World Matchplay to Thornton and Justin Pipe respectively. Van Barneveld put his bad form behind him in October by securing his first ranking title of 2013 at the tenth Players Championship of the year with a 6–3 defeat of Peter Wright in the final. However, less than a week later in the second round of the World Grand Prix he was beaten 3–0 by Michael van Gerwen in 21 minutes. In the defence of his Grand Slam of Darts title he beat Ricky Evans and Tony O'Shea, but lost his final group game against Mervyn King to be knocked out of the competition on leg difference.

=== 2014 season: Premier League glory ===
Van Barneveld took a 3–2 lead in sets over Mark Webster in the third round of the 2014 World Championship, but afterward exited the tournament losing 4–3. He had a poor run of form in the UK Open Qualifiers to be placed 66th on the Order of Merit meaning he entered the tournament in the first-round stage. Van Barneveld had four comfortable victories to reach the fifth round where he was beaten 9–2 by Adrian Lewis. He produced some of his most consistent darts in years during the Premier League as he remained unbeaten for 12 matches during the season to finish second in the table. In the semi-finals he secured his first win over Phil Taylor in the tournament after 21 attempts, having fought back from 4–1 down to triumph 8–5. It was the first time he had advanced beyond the semi-finals of the event, after losing at this stage in six previous years. Van Barneveld then won four successive legs from 5–5 in the final against Michael van Gerwen and went on to win the title 10–6. His finishing proved to be the difference between him and the rest of the nine players as throughout the 18 matches his checkout percentage was 50.22, seven percent higher than Simon Whitlock in second place. Afterwards, Van Barneveld revealed he had received therapy for depression in January due to the monotony of travelling and playing in events every week.

At the World Cup of Darts, Van Barneveld and Van Gerwen produced a 117.88 average in their doubles decider against Northern Ireland to whitewash them 4–0 and meet England's Taylor and Lewis in the final. Van Gerwen defeated Taylor 4–0 and Van Barneveld recorded the same scoreline against Lewis. Van Gerwen went into his singles match versus Lewis knowing a win would earn the Dutch pair the title and he did so with a 4–2 success. Early on in his second round match against Mervyn King at the World Grand Prix, Van Barneveld was visibly struggling with a back problem but battled to trail 2–1 in sets. However, in the fourth set he missed 30 starting doubles and began throwing at the bullseye. King duly won the match, with Van Barneveld issuing an apology to the PDC and the television viewers for giving up. At the next major event, the European Championship, Van Barneveld wore glasses during a match for the first time in his career and explained after his 6–4 first round win over Simon Whitlock that his diabetes can occasionally blur his vision. He won through to the semi-finals, but was beaten 11–6 by Van Gerwen who threw a nine darter during the game. The pair also met in the next televised event the Masters, in a first round match which went to a deciding leg with Van Gerwen leaving 32 after nine darts and edging Van Barneveld 10–9. He lost to newcomer Keegan Brown 10–7 in the last 16 of the Grand Slam and was drawn to face Van Gerwen in the first round again this time at the Players Championship Finals where he was defeated 6–2.

=== 2015 season ===
Van Barneveld decided not to wear his glasses in the first round of the 2015 World Championship and took out finishes of 167 and 170 in beating Rowby-John Rodriguez 3–0. He was then involved in three successive matches in which there was never more than a set between Van Barneveld and his opponent as he edged past Jamie Caven 4–3, Adrian Lewis 4–3 (despite Lewis hitting a 9-darter and missing one match dart) and Stephen Bunting 5–4. In the Bunting match he returned from a break after the fourth set with his glasses on explaining afterwards that the board was looking blurry. Van Barneveld looked to have got himself back into his semi-final meeting with Phil Taylor when he recovered from 2–0 down to draw level, but his lengthy previous matches seemed to take effect as he could not win another set to be defeated 6–2. At the Masters he knocked out newly crowned world champion Gary Anderson 11–6 in the semi-finals, but was beaten by a reversal of this scoreline against Michael van Gerwen in the final.

He eliminated reigning champion Adrian Lewis 9–3 at the UK Open, but then lost a televised match against Peter Wright for the first time as he was comprehensively beaten 9–1. In week seven of the Premier League, Van Barneveld defeated Taylor 7–4, despite Taylor averaging 115.80, the highest losing average in the history of televised darts. Van Barneveld survived relegation by leg difference, but then won six of his last seven matches to qualify for the play-offs. It included 7–2, 7–3 and 7–2 victories over Taylor, Van Gerwen and Lewis respectively. From 4–4 in the semi-finals against Van Gerwen, Van Barneveld won three successive legs which included missing double 12 for a nine-darter. However, Van Gerwen then took five legs on the trot and went on to win 10–8. The pair were knocked out in the semi-finals of the World Cup in a doubles match against Scotland's Anderson and Wright. He was eliminated in the first round of the World Matchplay for the first time in his career when Andy Hamilton beat him 10–7. Van Barneveld missed five championship darts in the final of the last leg of the Auckland Darts Masters to lose 11–10 against Lewis. He reached his first Pro Tour final in nearly two years at the 16th Players Championship, but lost 6–4 to Jelle Klaasen. Van Barneveld beat Larry Butler to qualify from his group at the Grand Slam and then came past James Wade 10–7 and Mark Webster 16–12 to reach the semi-finals, where he lost 16–12 to Taylor.

=== 2016 season ===
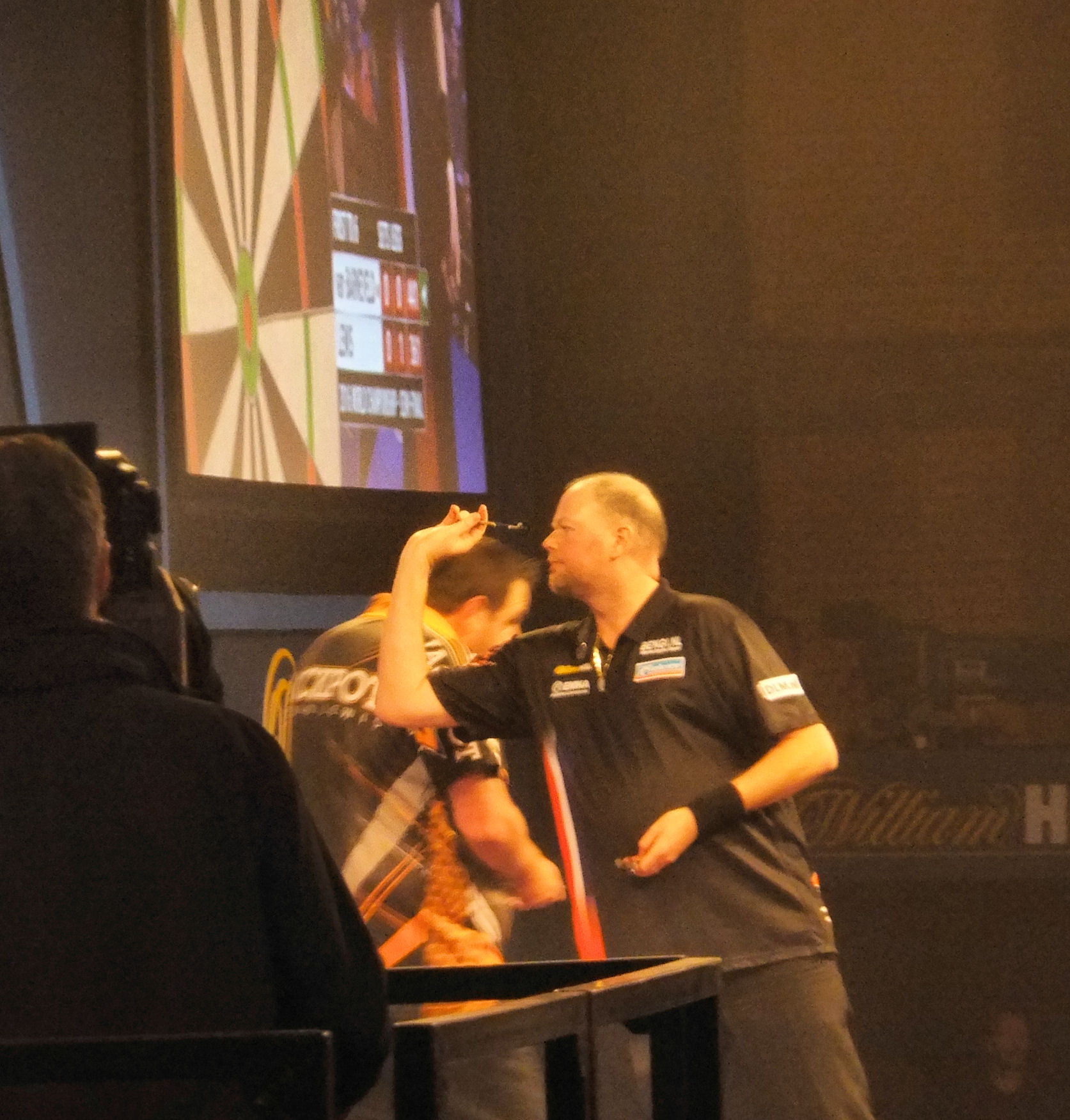
Van Barneveld in 2016

At the 2016 World Championship, Van Barneveld edged past Stephen Bunting in a final set decider for a second year in a row and then played Michael van Gerwen, who he had lost to 10 times out of 13 throughout 2015. Van Barneveld won 4–3, despite Van Gerwen averaging 105.78 which was at the time the highest to ever lose a match in the event. A third successive match went the distance in the quarter-finals after Van Barneveld recovered from a 3–0 deficit against Michael Smith. In the final set he survived one match dart from Smith and Van Barneveld won four legs in a row to move into the semi-finals where he played Adrian Lewis. This time he was 5–0 down and then won a trio of sets, but his poor start cost him as he lost 6–3. Van Barneveld finished the year seventh in the Premier League table to fail to qualify for the Play-offs for the first time since 2012. It was also his lowest position out of all of his 11 appearances at the event. The Netherlands team reached the final of the World Cup and it went to a deciding singles match in which Adrian Lewis beat Van Gerwen 4–1.

Van Barneveld was knocked out in the first round of the World Matchplay for the second successive year as Brendan Dolan won 10–7. He did not drop a set in reaching the semi-finals of the World Grand Prix as he overcame Mervyn King, Lewis and Benito van de Pas, but was defeated 4–1 by Gary Anderson. At the Grand Slam, Van Barneveld averaged over 100 in each of his three group games to top the table and then saw off the BDO's number one Glen Durrant 10–7 to play Anderson in the quarter-finals. The lead changed hands six times and Anderson closed the match with 13, 12, 11 and 11 dart legs to progress 16–13. Van Barneveld reached another quarter-final at the Players Championship Finals and he averaged 103, but Van Gerwen's 108.03 proved too strong as he won 10–5.

=== 2017 season ===
Van Barneveld edged past Adrian Lewis 4–3 in the third round of the 2017 World Championship and his 5–3 victory over Phil Taylor in the quarter-finals meant that Van Barneveld had reached the semi-finals for the last three years in the event. He took the first set without reply in his quest to reach his first final since 2009. However, Michael van Gerwen then produced the best performance ever seen in a World Championship game as he hit a tournament record average of 114.05 to win 6–2. Van Barneveld averaged 109.34 himself, the highest to ever lose a World Championship match. He also had a high losing average in the quarter-finals of the UK Open as Peter Wright came from 8–7 down to win 10–8 with Van Barneveld averaging 108.10. The Netherlands won their first World Cup since 2014 by seeing off the Welsh team of Gerwyn Price and Mark Webster 3–1 in the final.

=== 2018 season ===
Van Barneveld reached the quarter-final of the 2018 World Championship, losing to Michael van Gerwen 5–4. He reached his first premier event final for three years at the 2018 Masters, being defeated by Van Gerwen. Partnering Van Gerwen at the 2018 PDC World Cup of Darts, the Dutch duo retained their title, beating the Scotland pair of Gary Anderson and Peter Wright.

Van Barneveld announced on 19 November that he would retire after the 2020 PDC World Darts Championship.

=== 2019 season ===
Van Barneveld was eliminated in the second round of the 2019 World Championship by Darius Labanauskas. He was invited to the 2019 Premier League Darts, being eliminated after the first phase, having been bottom of the table after nine matches with 4 points.

=== 2020 season: Initial retirement ===
Following his elimination in the Premier League, Van Barneveld announced his immediate retirement on 28 March, before reversing the decision a day later, sticking to his original plan to retire after the 2020 World Championship.

He retired following a 3–1 defeat to American Darin Young in the first round, a result he claimed he could "never forgive" himself for.

=== 2021 season: Comeback ===
On 23 September 2020, Van Barneveld announced his intention to compete in the 2021 PDC Q-School, reversing his decision to retire.

He qualified for the second phase of Q-School after winning through on points before securing his two-year tour card on the last day finishing 3rd on the European Q-School Order of Merit.

On 27 February, Van Barneveld won his first tournament after his comeback at just the third time of asking, at the Players Championship 3 in Bolton. His 8–6 victory over Joe Cullen in the final marked his first individual PDC title since the 2014 Premier League, and first ranking title since 2013. Van Barneveld's run to the final included a 6–1 win against Darius Labanauskas in the last 16, a 6–2 triumph over Alan Soutar at the quarter-final stage and a 7–3 victory in the semi-finals against Ian White.

=== 2022 season: Grand Slam semi-finalist ===
In his return to the big stage at the 2022 World Championship, van Barneveld lost 3–1 to Rob Cross in the second round.

At the 2022 Grand Slam, Van Barneveld won all three of his group matches against Dave Chisnall, Ted Evetts and defending champion, Gerwyn Price. He would later beat Price again in the quarterfinals 16–13. Van Barneveld's run came to an end in the semi-finals, losing to eventual winner Michael Smith 16–12.

=== 2023 season ===
At the 2023 World Championship, van Barneveld won his opening game 3–1 against Ryan Meikle before being whitewashed 4–0 by Gerwyn Price in the third round.

At the 2023 UK Open, van Barneveld was defeated 9–10 in the fourth round by Rob Cross in a deciding leg.

=== 2024 season ===
At the 2024 World Championship, van Barneveld achieved wins over Radek Szagański and Jim Williams, before losing 4–1 to eventual runner-up Luke Littler in the fourth round.

At the 2024 UK Open, van Barneveld was defeated 9–10 in the fourth round by Luke Woodhouse in a deciding leg.

On 18 March 2024, on the 2024 PDC Pro Tour, van Barneveld won his first players championship title since 2021, winning PC5 at Hildesheim. Van Barneveld defeated Oskar Lukasiak 6–1 in legs in the first round. In the second round he defeated Jermaine Wattimena 6–3. Van Barneveld followed that up with a 6–2 win against Graham Hall in the third round, before facing Michael Smith in the fourth round. Van Barneveld defeated Smith 6–3 despite Smith hitting a nine-dart finish. He defeated James Hurrell 6–3 in the quarter-finals before a 7–6 victory over Gary Anderson in the semi-finals, surviving match darts in a deciding leg. An 8–1 win over Stephen Bunting in the final followed.

=== 2025 season ===
At the 2025 World Championship, Van Barneveld suffered a second round exit, losing 3–1 to Nick Kenny.

At the 2025 UK Open, Van Barneveld was once again knocked out of the fourth round of the tournament to defending champion Dimitri van den Bergh 10–6.

Van Barneveld was granted permission by the PDC to participate in the Champion of Champions tournament organised by World Seniors Darts on 29 June, despite still being a Tour Card holder. He was eliminated in the semi-finals by eventual champion Ross Montgomery 6–3.

=== 2026 season ===
At the 2026 World Championship, Van Barneveld lost in his opening game to Swiss player Stefan Bellmont 3–0.

Van Barneveld was also eliminated in the 4th round for the fourth consecutive time at the 2026 UK Open, losing to Wessel Nijman 10–1.

== Outside of darts ==
In 2012, Van Barneveld, together with the seven other players who competed in the 2012 Premier League Darts recorded a charity single with Chas Hodges and his band called 'Got My Tickets for the Darts' which was written by Chas. It was released exclusively on iTunes on 18 May, the night after the play-offs at the O2 in London, where it was premiered. Proceeds from the single were donated to the Haven House Children's Hospice. In 2017, Van Barneveld featured in the song '180 linkerbaan' (180 left lane) by Dutch rapper Donnie (Donald Scloszkie).

Van Barneveld was a contestant in the 2020 season of the television show Het Perfecte Plaatje.

== Personal life ==
Van Barneveld lives in The Hague with his wife Julia. Previously, he was married to Sylvia for 25 years. They divorced in January 2019. Raymond has three children: a son, William (born 1989) and daughters Daisy (born 1992) and Patty (born 1994). In October 2009, during the World Grand Prix tournament in Ireland, Van Barneveld revealed that he had been diagnosed with type 2 diabetes that summer, and that it can affect his vision if his blood sugar level is too high. He is a supporter of ADO Den Haag.

== Awards and records ==
- Best PDC Pro Tour Player/Floor Player: 2008
- PDC Nine Dart Club: *2006, *2009, *2010, -2010, *2011 (x2), -2012, -2013 *Gold Pin Badge (televised) / -Silver Pin Badge (non-televised)
- PDC Televised Performance of the Year: 2013
- PDC Best Newcomer: 2006
- BDO Personality Award: 1998
- Knight of the Order of Orange-Nassau: 1999

== World Championship results ==
=== BDO ===
- 1991: First round (lost to Keith Sullivan 0–3)
- 1992: Did not play
- 1993: Second round (lost to John Lowe 2–3)
- 1994: Did not play
- 1995: Runner-up (lost to Richie Burnett 3–6)
- 1996: Second round (lost to Matt Clark 1–3)
- 1997: Second round (lost to Les Wallace 2–3)
- 1998: Winner (beat Richie Burnett 6–5)
- 1999: Winner (beat Ronnie Baxter 6–5)
- 2000: First round (lost to Chris Mason 1–3)
- 2001: Quarter-final (lost to Ted Hankey 4–5)
- 2002: Quarter-final (lost to Mervyn King 3–5)
- 2003: Winner (beat Ritchie Davies 6–3)
- 2004: Semi-final (lost to Andy Fordham 4–5)
- 2005: Winner (beat Martin Adams 6–2)
- 2006: Runner-up (lost to Jelle Klaasen 5–7)

=== PDC ===
- 2007: Winner (beat Phil Taylor 7–6)
- 2008: Third round (lost to Kevin Painter 2–4)
- 2009: Runner-up (lost to Phil Taylor 1–7)
- 2010: Semi-final (lost to Simon Whitlock 5–6); Fourth place: lost to Mark Webster 8–10 (legs)
- 2011: Quarter-final (lost to Gary Anderson 1–5)
- 2012: First round (lost to James Richardson 0–3)
- 2013: Semi-final (lost to Phil Taylor 4–6)
- 2014: Third round (lost to Mark Webster 3–4)
- 2015: Semi-final (lost to Phil Taylor 2–6)
- 2016: Semi-final (lost to Adrian Lewis 3–6)
- 2017: Semi-final (lost to Michael van Gerwen 2–6)
- 2018: Quarter-final (lost to Michael van Gerwen 4–5)
- 2019: Second round (lost to Darius Labanauskas 2–3)
- 2020: First round (lost to Darin Young 1–3)
- 2022: Second round (lost to Rob Cross 1–3)
- 2023: Third round (lost to Gerwyn Price 0–4)
- 2024: Fourth round (lost to Luke Littler 1–4)
- 2025: Second round (lost to Nick Kenny 1–3)
- 2026: First round (lost to Stefan Bellmont 0–3)

== Career finals ==
=== BDO major finals: 17 (14 titles) ===
Legend
World Championship (4–2)
Winmau World Masters (2–1)
World Darts Trophy (2–0)
Zuiderduin Masters (3–0)
International Darts League (3–0)

Outcome	No.	Year	Championship	Opponent in the final	Score (Note: (l) = score in legs, (s) = score in sets, (p) = score in points, (m) = score in matches.)
Runner-up	1.	1995	World Championship	(Wales) Richie Burnett	3–6 (s)
Winner	1.	1998	World Championship (1)	(Wales) Richie Burnett	6–5 (s)
Winner	2.	1999	World Championship (2)	(England) Ronnie Baxter	6–5 (s)
Winner	3.	2001	Winmau World Masters (1)	(Finland) Jarkko Komula	4–2 (s)
Winner	4.	2001	Zuiderduin Masters (1)	(England) Andy Fordham	5–1 (s)
Winner	5.	2003	World Championship (3)	(Wales) Ritchie Davies	6–3 (s)
Winner	6.	2003	International Darts League	(England) Mervyn King	8–5 (s)
Winner	7.	2003	World Darts Trophy	(England) Mervyn King	6–2 (s)
Runner-up	2.	2003	Winmau World Masters (1)	(England) Tony West	6–7 (s)
Winner	8.	2003	Zuiderduin Masters (2)	(England) Mervyn King	6–1 (s)
Winner	9.	2004	International Darts League (2)	(Australia) Tony David	13–5 (s)
Winner	10.	2004	World Darts Trophy (2)	(England) Martin Adams	6–4 (s)
Winner	11.	2004	Zuiderduin Masters (3)	(England) Ted Hankey	5–1 (s)
Winner	12.	2005	World Championship (4)	(England) Martin Adams	6–2 (s)
Winner	13.	2005	Winmau World Masters (2)	(Sweden) Göran Klemme	7–3 (s)
Runner-up	3.	2006	World Championship (5)	(Netherlands) Jelle Klaasen	5–7 (s)
Winner	14.	2006	International Darts League (3)	(England) Colin Lloyd	13–5 (s)

=== PDC major finals: 15 (6 titles) ===
Legend
World Championship (1–1)
World Matchplay (0–1)
World Grand Prix (0–2)
Grand Slam (1–0)
Premier League (1–0)
UK Open (2–0)
Masters (0–2)
Las Vegas Desert Classic (1–2)
US Open (0–1)

Outcome	No.	Year	Championship	Opponent in the final	Score
Winner	1.	2006	UK Open	Barrie Bates	13–7 (l)
Runner-up	1.	2006	Las Vegas Desert Classic	John Part	3–6 (s)
Winner	2.	2007	World Championship	Phil Taylor	7–6 (s)
Runner-up	2.	2007	US Open	Phil Taylor	1–4 (s)
Winner	3.	2007	UK Open (2)	Vincent van der Voort	16–8 (l)
Winner	4.	2007	Las Vegas Desert Classic	Terry Jenkins	13–6 (l)
Runner-up	3.	2008	World Grand Prix	Phil Taylor	2–6 (s)
Runner-up	4.	2009	World Championship	Phil Taylor	1–7 (s)
Runner-up	5.	2009	Las Vegas Desert Classic (2)	Phil Taylor	11–13 (l)
Runner-up	6.	2009	World Grand Prix (2)	Phil Taylor	3–6 (s)
Runner-up	7.	2010	World Matchplay	Phil Taylor	12–18 (l)
Winner	5.	2012	Grand Slam	Michael van Gerwen	16–14 (l)
Winner	6.	2014	Premier League	Michael van Gerwen	10–6 (l)
Runner-up	8.	2015	Masters	Michael van Gerwen	6–11 (l)
Runner-up	9.	2018	Masters (2)	Michael van Gerwen	9–11 (l)

=== PDC world series finals: 5 ===
Legend
World Series of Darts (0–5)

Outcome	No.	Year	Championship	Opponent in the final	Score
Runner-up	1.	2013	Dubai Darts Masters	Michael van Gerwen	7–11 (l)
Runner-up	2.	2015	Auckland Darts Masters	Adrian Lewis	10–11 (l)
Runner-up	3.	2017	Perth Darts Masters	Gary Anderson	7–11 (l)
Runner-up	4.	2018	Auckland Darts Masters (2)	Michael van Gerwen	4–11 (l)
Runner-up	5.	2019	New Zealand Darts Masters	Michael van Gerwen	1–8 (l)

=== Independent major finals: 1 (1 title) ===
Outcome	No.	Year	Championship	Opponent in the final	Score
Winner	1.	2007	Masters of Darts	(England) Peter Manley	7–0 (s)

=== PDC team finals: 7 (6 titles) ===
Legend
World Cup (4–1)
World Pairs (1–0)

Outcome	No.	Year	Championship	Team	Teammate	Opponents in the final	Score
Winner	1.	1997	World Pairs	—N/a	Roland Scholten	Richie Burnett and Rod Harrington	18–15 (l)
Winner	2.	2007	World Darts Challenge	—N/a	John Kuczynski	Phil Taylor and Ray Carver	14–11 (l)
Winner	3.	2010	World Cup of Darts	Netherlands	Co Stompé	Wales – Mark Webster and Barrie Bates	4–2 (p)
Winner	4.	2014	World Cup of Darts (2)	Netherlands	Michael van Gerwen	England – Phil Taylor and Adrian Lewis	3–0 (m)
Runner-up	1.	2016	World Cup of Darts	Netherlands	Michael van Gerwen	England – Phil Taylor and Adrian Lewis	2–3 (m)
Winner	5.	2017	World Cup of Darts (3)	Netherlands	Michael van Gerwen	Wales – Gerwyn Price and Mark Webster	3–1 (m)
Winner	6.	2018	World Cup of Darts (4)	Netherlands	Michael van Gerwen	Scotland – Gary Anderson and Peter Wright	3–1 (m)

== Performance timeline ==
Performance Table Legend
W	Won the tournament	F	Finalist	SF	Semifinalist	QF	Quarterfinalist	#R; RR; Prel.	Lost in # round Round-robin; Preliminary round	DQ	Disqualified
DNQ	Did not qualify	DNP	Did not participate	WD	Withdrew	NH	Tournament not held	#R; RR; Prel.	Lost in # round Round-robin; Preliminary round	NYF	Not yet founded

=== BDO ===
Tournament	1990	1991	1992	1993	1994	1995	1996	1997	1998	1999	2000	2001	2002	2003	2004	2005	2006	2007
World Championship	DNQ	1R	DNQ	2R	DNQ	F	2R	2R	W	W	1R	QF	QF	W	SF	W	F	PDC
International Darts League	Not held													W	W	2R	W	QF
World Darts Trophy	Not held												SF	W	W	2R	1R	1R
World Masters	3R	2R	RR	2R	4R	SF	4R	2R	2R	4R	1R	W	2R	F	4R	W	PDC	
Zuiderduin Masters	Not held										SF	W	SF	W	W	QF	NH	PDC
European Masters	Not held					SF	Not held											

=== WSD ===
Tournament	2025
WSD Televised events
Champion of Champions	SF

=== PDC ===
Tournament	2005	2006	2007	2008	2009	2010	2011	2012	2013	2014	2015	2016	2017	2018	2019	2020	2021	2022	2023	2024	2025	2026
PDC Ranked televised events
World Championship	BDO		W	3R	F	SF	QF	1R	SF	3R	SF	SF	SF	QF	2R	1R	Ret.	2R	3R	4R	2R	1R
Masters (Note: A ranked event from 2025)	Not held								SF	1R	F	1R	QF	F	Did not qualify						DNP	
UK Open	BDO	W	W	SF	5R	DNQ	5R	QF	SF	5R	4R	4R	QF	3R	4R	(Note: resigned Tour Card and retired from professional darts after the 2020 PDC World Darts Championship, before making a comeback in 2021)	2R	3R	4R	4R	4R	4R
World Matchplay	BDO	DNQ	QF	QF	QF	F	QF	2R	2R	2R	1R	1R	2R	2R	DNQ	(Note: resigned Tour Card and retired from professional darts after the 2020 PDC World Darts Championship, before making a comeback in 2021)	DNQ		1R	1R	1R	DNQ
World Grand Prix	BDO	2R	SF	F	F	SF	2R	1R	2R	2R	1R	SF	QF	2R	DNQ	(Note: resigned Tour Card and retired from professional darts after the 2020 PDC World Darts Championship, before making a comeback in 2021)	DNQ		1R	1R	1R	DNQ
European Championship	Not held			QF	2R	QF	SF	QF	2R	SF	1R	Did not qualify				(Note: resigned Tour Card and retired from professional darts after the 2020 PDC World Darts Championship, before making a comeback in 2021)	DNQ		1R	1R	1R	DNQ
Grand Slam (Note: A non-ranked event until 2015.)	Not held		2R	QF	SF	2R	RR	W	RR	2R	SF	QF	2R	RR	DNQ	(Note: resigned Tour Card and retired from professional darts after the 2020 PDC World Darts Championship, before making a comeback in 2021)	RR	SF	DNQ			
Players Championship Finals	Not held				QF	DNQ	2R	1R	QF	1R	1R	QF	1R	DNQ	QF	(Note: resigned Tour Card and retired from professional darts after the 2020 PDC World Darts Championship, before making a comeback in 2021)	2R	1R	1R	2R	1R	
PDC Non-ranked televised events
Premier League	DNP	SF	SF	SF	SF	6th	SF	5th	SF	W	SF	7th	6th	6th	9th	Did not participate						
Champions League	Not held											DNQ	SF	DNQ		Not held						
World Cup	Not held					W	NH	SF	2R	W	SF	F	W	W	Did not qualify							
World Series Finals	Not held										QF	2R	2R	SF	QF	Did not qualify			QF	2R	2R	DNQ
PDC Past major events
Las Vegas Desert Classic	BDO	F	W	2R	F	Not held																
Masters of Darts	SF	NH	W	Not held																		
Career statistics
Year-end ranking	NR	32	2	2	2	3	8	13	10	14	16	12	9	17	40	NR	58	29	29	34	36	

==== European Tour ====
Season	1	2	3	4	5	6	7	8	9	10	11	12	13	14	15
2012	ADO; SF	GDC; QF	EDO; W	GDM; SF	DDM; 2R										
2013	UKM; 3R	EDT; DNP	EDO; 3R	ADO; 3R	GDT; DNP	GDC; 1R	GDM; 2R	DDM; 2R							
2014	GDC; QF	DDM; DNQ	GDM; 1R	ADO; DNQ	GDT; DNQ	EDO; 2R	EDG; DNQ	EDT; 2R							
2015	Did not participate						EDT; 1R	EDM; 3R	EDG; 3R						
2016	Did not participate								EDG; SF	GDC; DNP					
2017	GDC; DNP	GDM; QF	Did not participate												
2019	EDO; 1R	GDC; DNQ	GDG; DNP	GDO; 3R	ADO; 2R	EDG; DNQ	DDM; 3R	Did not participate							
2022	IDO; DNP	GDC; DNQ	GDG; 2R	Did not qualify						HDT; 2R	GDO; 2R	BDO; DNQ	GDT; DNQ		
2023	BSD; 1R	EDO; 2R	IDO; 2R	GDG; 2R	ADO; 2R	DDC; 1R	BDO; 2R	CDO; DNQ	EDG; 3R	EDM; QF	DNQ				
2024	BDO; 1R	GDG; 1R	IDO; 1R	EDG; 2R	ADO; 2R	BSD; 2R	DDC; 1R	EDO; 3R	GDC; 1R	FDT; 2R	HDT; 2R	SDT; QF	CDO; 3R		
2025	BDO; 2R	EDT; 1R	IDO; 3R	GDG; 2R	ADO; 1R	EDG; 3R	DDC; 2R	EDO; 1R	BSD; 1R	FDT; 2R	CDO; 1R	HDT; 3R	SDT; QF	GDC; 2R	
2026	PDO; DNQ	EDT; DNQ	BDO; 1R	GDG; 1R	EDG; 1R	ADO; 1R	Did not qualify						FDT; 1R	SDT; 1R	DDC; DNQ

==== Players Championships ====
Season	1	2	3	4	5	6	7	8	9	10	11	12	13	14	15	16	17	18	19	20	21	22	23	24	25	26	27	28	29	30	31	32	33	34
2012	ALI; 4R	ALI; 4R	REA; 4R	REA; QF	CRA; QF	CRA; SF	BIR; 4R	BIR; 4R	DNP				DUB; 2R	DUB; QF	DNP																			
2013	WIG; 4R	WIG; 3R	DNP				BAR; QF	BAR; 3R	DUB; 4R	DUB; W	DNP																							
2014	BAR; 2R	BAR; SF	CRA; DNP		WIG; QF	WIG; QF	WIG; 2R	WIG; 4R	CRA; 1R	CRA; 1R	COV; 4R	COV; 1R	CRA; 3R	CRA; 2R	DUB; 1R	DUB; 1R	CRA; 3R	CRA; 3R	COV; 3R	COV; 1R														
2015	BAR; 3R	BAR; QF	BAR; 3R	BAR; 1R	BAR; 3R	COV; 3R	COV; 1R	DNP							BAR; 2R	BAR; F	DUB; 2R	DUB; 3R	COV; 4R	COV; 4R														
2016	BAR; 4R	BAR; 2R	DNP											BAR; 4R	BAR; QF	BAR; 3R	DUB; 1R	DUB; 2R	BAR; 2R	BAR; 3R														
2017	BAR; 1R	BAR; QF	BAR; QF	BAR; 2R	MIL; 1R	MIL; QF	BAR; 1R	BAR; 4R	DNP										DUB; 1R	DUB; 4R	BAR; DNP													
2018	BAR; 1R	BAR; 1R	DNP				BAR; 1R	BAR; 4R	DNP										DUB; 2R	DUB; 2R	BAR; 1R	BAR; 2R												
2019	WIG; 2R	WIG; 1R	WIG; DNP		BAR; 2R	BAR; 1R	WIG; 2R	WIG; F	BAR; 1R	BAR; 2R	BAR; 2R	BAR; 1R	BAR; 4R	BAR; 1R	BAR; 3R	BAR; 1R	WIG; DNP		BAR; 2R	BAR; 2R	HIL; 1R	HIL; 2R	BAR; 1R	BAR; 4R	BAR; 3R	BAR; 1R	DNP							
2020 (Note: Not a Tour card holder)	Did not participate																																	
2021	BOL; 1R	BOL; 2R	BOL; W	BOL; 2R	MIL; 1R	MIL; 1R	MIL; 2R	MIL; 1R	NIE; 1R	NIE; QF	NIE; 2R	NIE; DNP	MIL; 3R	MIL; 2R	MIL; 2R	MIL; 2R	COV; QF	COV; 1R	COV; 2R	COV; 3R	BAR; 1R	BAR; 3R	BAR; 3R	BAR; 1R	BAR; 1R	BAR; 3R	BAR; 1R	BAR; 2R	BAR; 3R	BAR; 3R				
2022	BAR; 2R	BAR; 2R	WIG; 3R	WIG; 2R	BAR; 2R	BAR; 2R	NIE; 4R	NIE; 2R	BAR; 4R	BAR; 2R	BAR; 1R	BAR; 2R	BAR; 2R	WIG; 1R	WIG; 3R	NIE; 3R	NIE; 2R	BAR; 2R	BAR; 4R	BAR; 2R	BAR; 1R	BAR; 1R	BAR; 1R	BAR; 1R	BAR; 3R	BAR; 1R	BAR; 2R	BAR; 2R	BAR; 2R	BAR; 4R				
2023	BAR; 2R	BAR; 4R	BAR; 1R	BAR; 4R	BAR; QF	BAR; 1R	HIL; 1R	HIL; 3R	WIG; 2R	WIG; 2R	LEI; 1R	LEI; 1R	HIL; 4R	HIL; 3R	LEI; 1R	LEI; 1R	HIL; 2R	HIL; 1R	BAR; 3R	BAR; 3R	BAR; 1R	BAR; QF	BAR; 1R	BAR; 2R	BAR; 1R	BAR; 1R	BAR; 4R	BAR; QF	BAR; 4R	BAR; 3R				
2024	WIG; 2R	WIG; QF	LEI; 4R	LEI; QF	HIL; W	HIL; 3R	LEI; 1R	LEI; 2R	HIL; 3R	HIL; 3R	HIL; SF	HIL; 1R	MIL; 4R	MIL; 2R	MIL; 4R	MIL; 1R	MIL; 1R	MIL; 2R	MIL; 1R	WIG; 1R	WIG; 1R	MIL; 2R	MIL; 2R	WIG; 2R	WIG; 4R	WIG; SF	WIG; 2R	WIG; 2R	LEI; 2R	LEI; 4R				
2025	WIG; 1R	WIG; 2R	ROS; 3R	ROS; 4R	LEI; 1R	LEI; 3R	HIL; 1R	HIL; 4R	LEI; 1R	LEI; QF	LEI; 1R	LEI; 2R	ROS; 1R	ROS; 3R	HIL; 2R	HIL; 4R	LEI; 3R	LEI; 2R	LEI; 3R	LEI; 2R	LEI; 2R	HIL; 1R	HIL; 2R	MIL; 2R	MIL; 2R	HIL; 2R	HIL; 2R	LEI; 3R	LEI; 1R	LEI; 2R	WIG; 2R	WIG; 1R	WIG; 3R	WIG; 2R
2026	HIL; 1R	HIL; 2R	WIG; 1R	WIG; 1R	LEI; 1R	LEI; 1R	LEI; 4R	LEI; 1R	WIG; 1R	WIG; 3R	MIL; 1R	MIL; 1R	HIL; 1R	HIL; 2R	LEI; 1R	LEI; 1R	LEI; 1R	LEI; DNP	MIL; 1R	MIL; 2R	WIG; 1R	WIG; 1R	LEI; 2R	LEI; 2R	HIL; 2R	HIL; 4R	LEI; 2R	LEI; 2R	ROS; 2R	ROS; QF	ROS; 2R	ROS; 2R	LEI; QF	LEI; 2R

== Nine-dart finishes ==
In January 2009, in the quarter-finals of the 2009 PDC World Darts Championship, Van Barneveld became the first player in professional darts to hit a nine darter at the PDC World Darts Championship.

Raymond van Barneveld's televised nine-dart finishes
Date	Opponent	Tournament	Method	Prize
23 March 2006	(England) Peter Manley	Premier League	3 x T20; 3 x T20; T20, T19, D12	
2 January 2009	(Netherlands) Jelle Klaasen	PDC World Championship	3 x T20; 3 x T20; T20, T19, D12	£20,000
28 December 2009	(Northern Ireland) Brendan Dolan	PDC World Championship	3 x T20; 3 x T20; T20, T19, D12	£25,000
29 April 2010	(England) Terry Jenkins	Premier League	3 x T20; 3 x T20; T20, T19, D12	
17 July 2010	(England) Denis Ovens	World Matchplay	3 x T20; 3 x T20; T20, T19, D12	£5,000

== High averages ==
Raymond van Barneveld televised high averages
Average	Date	Opponent	Tournament	Stage	Score
113.38	3 June 2018	(Belgium) Dimitri Van den Bergh	2018 PDC World Cup of Darts	Semi-finals	4–2 (l)
113.04	20 September 2012	(England) Terry Jenkins	2012 European Championship	Round 1	6–1 (l)
112.28	5 April 2012	(England) Kevin Painter	2012 Premier League	League	8–6 (l)
110.15	12 November 2016	(England) Nathan Aspinall	2016 Grand Slam of Darts	Group stage	5–1 (l)

== Notes ==
Sporting positions
Preceded by Phil Taylor	PDC World Number One; 1 January 2008 – 8 June 2008	Succeeded by Phil Taylor
