= 2012 UK Open Qualifier 6 =

UK Open Qualifier 6

Tournament information
- Dates: Sunday 15 April
- Venue: Barnsley Metrodome
- Location: Barnsley
- Country: England
- Organisation(s): PDC
- Format: Best of 11 legs
- Prize fund: £34,600
- Winner's share: £6,000

Champion(s)
- (Netherlands) Raymond van Barneveld

The 2012 UK Open Qualifier 6 was the sixth of eight 2012 UK Open Darts Qualifiers which was held at the Metrodome in Barnsley on Sunday 15 April.

== Prize money ==
Stage	Prize money (Total-£34,600)
Winner	£6,000
Runner Up	£3,000
Semi Final	£2,000
Quarter Final	£1,000
Fourth Round	£600
Third Round	£400
Second Round	£200
First Round	£0
Preliminary Round	£0

== Draw ==
Second round
(England)	Damien Sherwood	5
(England)	Richie Howson	6
(England)	Daniel Starkey	1
(England)	Mark Hylton	6
(England)	Patrick Pace	4
(Netherlands)	Gino Vos	6
(England)	Adam Hunt	1
(England)	Matthew Edgar	6
(Scotland)	Mike Veitch	2
(England)	Stuart White	6
(England)	Michael Smith	6
(Netherlands)	Vincent van der Voort	5
(England)	Ian White	6
(Netherlands)	Michael van Gerwen	5
(Australia)	Simon Whitlock	6
(England)	Dennis Smith	5
(Netherlands)	Roland Scholten	6
(Netherlands)	Co Stompé	2
(Canada)	John Part	6
(England)	Dean Winstanley	3
(England)	Aden Kirk	2
(England)	Ian Jopling	6
(England)	Andrew Gilding	2
(England)	Colin Lloyd	6
(England)	Mark Dudbridge	3
(England)	Andy Pearce	6
(England)	Joe Cullen	6
(England)	Scott Rand	4
(England)	Wayne Jones	3
(England)	Justin Pipe	6
(South Africa)	Devon Petersen	5
(England)	James Wade	6
(England)	Dave Ladley	6
(England)	Ted Hankey	2
(Scotland)	Keith Stephen	6
(England)	Darren Webster	5
(England)	Lee Whitworth	1
(Northern Ireland)	Brendan Dolan	6
(England)	Ian Moss	5
(England)	Alan Tabern	6
(England)	Mervyn King	4
(Wales)	Richie Burnett	6
(England)	Matt Clark	6
(England)	Kevin McDine	2
(Scotland)	Robert Thornton	6
(England)	Jamie Caven	4
(England)	Kevin Painter	6
(England)	James Richardson	5
(England)	Dennis Priestley	6
(Sweden)	Magnus Caris	1
(Wales)	Steve Evans	5
(Spain)	Antonio Alcinas	6
(England)	Colin Osborne	6
(Spain)	Carlos Rodríguez	0
(England)	Adrian Gray	3
(Republic of Ireland)	Liam Kelly	6
(England)	Joey Palfreyman	3
(England)	Darren Johnson	6
(England)	Tony West	3
(Netherlands)	Raymond van Barneveld	6
(England)	Alex Roy	4
(England)	Josh Jones	6
(England)	Adrian Lewis	2
(England)	Wes Newton	6

Third round
(England)	Richie Howson	6
(England)	Mark Hylton	0
(Netherlands)	Gino Vos	4
(England)	Matthew Edgar	6
(England)	Stuart White	6
(England)	Michael Smith	4
(England)	Ian White	6
(Australia)	Simon Whitlock	2
(Netherlands)	Roland Scholten	0
(Canada)	John Part	6
(England)	Ian Jopling	1
(England)	Colin Lloyd	6
(England)	Andy Pearce	0
(England)	Joe Cullen	6
(England)	Justin Pipe	2
(England)	James Wade	6
(England)	Dave Ladley	4
(Scotland)	Keith Stephen	6
(Northern Ireland)	Brendan Dolan	6
(England)	Alan Tabern	5
(Wales)	Richie Burnett	6
(England)	Matt Clark	1
(Scotland)	Robert Thornton	6
(England)	Kevin Painter	0
(England)	Dennis Priestley	6
(Spain)	Antonio Alcinas	4
(England)	Colin Osborne	4
(Republic of Ireland)	Liam Kelly	6
(England)	Darren Johnson	1
(Netherlands)	Raymond van Barneveld	6
(England)	Josh Jones	2
(England)	Wes Newton	6

Fourth round
(England)	Richie Howson	6
(England)	Matthew Edgar	4
(England)	Stuart White	4
(England)	Ian White	6
(Canada)	John Part	2
(England)	Colin Lloyd	6
(England)	Joe Cullen	0
(England)	James Wade	6
(Scotland)	Keith Stephen	3
(Northern Ireland)	Brendan Dolan	6
(Wales)	Richie Burnett	6
(Scotland)	Robert Thornton	2
(England)	Dennis Priestley	6
(Republic of Ireland)	Liam Kelly	0
(Netherlands)	Raymond van Barneveld	6
(England)	Wes Newton	5

Quarter-finals
(England)	Richie Howson	2
(England)	Ian White	6
(England)	Colin Lloyd	6
(England)	James Wade	5
(Northern Ireland)	Brendan Dolan	2
(Wales)	Richie Burnett	6
(England)	Dennis Priestley	1
(Netherlands)	Raymond van Barneveld	6

Semi-finals
(England)	Ian White	6
(England)	Colin Lloyd	2
(Wales)	Richie Burnett	2
(Netherlands)	Raymond van Barneveld	6

Final
(England)	Ian White	2
(Netherlands)	Raymond van Barneveld	6
