= 2009 PDC Pro Tour =

2009 darts tournament

The 2009 PDC Pro Tour was a series of non-televised darts tournaments organised by the Professional Darts Corporation (PDC). They consisted of Professional Dart Players Association (PDPA) Players Championships and UK Open Regional Finals.

== Prize money ==
Stage	UK/European Events	Non-European Events
Second round	£200	£100
Third round	£300	£200
Fourth round	£400	£300
Quarter-finals	£800	£700
Semi-finals	£1,500	£1,240
Final	£3,000	£2,500
Winner	£6,000	£5,000

In addition, £400 per Pro Tour event was reserved for a nine-dart finish. Should this not be won in an event, it would be carried over to the next event, and so on until a nine-dart finish is achieved. Once the prize fund is won, it will revert to £400 for the next event.

== Players Championships ==
(All matches – best of 11 legs)

=== Players Championship 1 ===
- Bobby Bourn Memorial Players Championship at The Dome Leisure Centre, Doncaster on 10 January

Quarter-finals		Semi-finals		Final
(England) Mark Dudbridge	6
(United States) John Kuczynski	4	(England) Mark Dudbridge	6
(England) Andy Smith	6	(England) Andy Smith	5
(England) Andy Hamilton	2			(England) Mark Dudbridge	3
(England) Terry Jenkins	6			(England) Terry Jenkins	6
(England) Colin Lloyd	5	(England) Terry Jenkins	6
(Scotland) Robert Thornton	6	(Scotland) Robert Thornton	4
(Netherlands) Jelle Klaasen	4

=== Players Championship 2 ===
- Eddie Cox Memorial Players Championship at Victoria Stadium, Gibraltar on 17 January

Quarter-finals		Semi-finals		Final
(England) Phil Taylor	6
(England) Steve Beaton	2	(England) Phil Taylor	6
(England) Colin Osborne	6	(England) Colin Osborne	5
(England) Mark Walsh	4			(England) Phil Taylor	6
(England) Alan Tabern	6			(England) Alan Tabern	2
(Scotland) Robert Thornton	2	(England) Alan Tabern	6
(England) Mark Dudbridge	6	(England) Mark Dudbridge	4
(England) Kevin Painter	3

=== Players Championship 3 ===
- Players Championship 3 at Victoria Stadium, Gibraltar on 18 January

Quarter-finals		Semi-finals		Final
(England) Steve Beaton	6
(England) Andy Jenkins	3	(England) Steve Beaton	4
(England) Mark Dudbridge	6	(England) Mark Dudbridge	6
(England) Kevin McDine	3			(England) Mark Dudbridge	1
(England) Phil Taylor	6			(England) Phil Taylor	6
(England) Alan Tabern	3	(England) Phil Taylor	6
(Scotland) Robert Thornton	6	(Scotland) Robert Thornton	3
(England) Wes Newton	4

=== Players Championship 4 ===
- Players Championship 4 at van der Valk Hotel, Gladbeck on 28 February

Quarter-finals		Semi-finals		Final
(England) Phil Taylor	6
(Netherlands) Michael van Gerwen	3	(England) Phil Taylor	6
(Netherlands) Vincent van der Voort	6	(Netherlands) Vincent van der Voort	1
(England) Colin Osborne	0			(England) Phil Taylor	6
(England) Adrian Lewis	6			(England) Adrian Lewis	0
(England) Alan Tabern	2	(England) Adrian Lewis	6
(England) Denis Ovens	6	(England) Denis Ovens	1
(England) Wayne Jones	5

=== Players Championship 5 ===
- Players Championship 5 at van der Valk Hotel, Gladbeck on 1 March

Quarter-finals		Semi-finals		Final
(England) Phil Taylor	6
(England) Matt Clark	2	(England) Phil Taylor	6
(England) Kevin Painter	6	(England) Kevin Painter	5
(England) Kevin McDine	3			(England) Phil Taylor	6
(England) Alan Tabern	6			(England) Adrian Lewis	1
(England) Steve Maish	3	(England) Alan Tabern	4
(England) Adrian Lewis	6	(England) Adrian Lewis	6
(Scotland) Robert Thornton	4

=== Players Championship 6 ===
- Players Championship 6 at Magnum Leisure Centre, Irvine on 7 March

Quarter-finals		Semi-finals		Final
(Scotland) Robert Thornton	6
(England) Wayne Jones	5	(Scotland) Robert Thornton	6
(England) Tony Eccles	6	(England) Tony Eccles	2
(England) Steve Hine	1			(Scotland) Robert Thornton	6
(England) Dennis Priestley	6			(England) Dennis Priestley	5
(England) James Wade	5	(England) Dennis Priestley	6
(England) Andy Smith	6	(England) Andy Smith	2
(England) Ronnie Baxter	3

=== Players Championship 7 ===
- Players Championship 7 at Robin Park Tennis Centre, Wigan on 14 March

Quarter-finals		Semi-finals		Final
(England) Colin Lloyd	6
(England) Alan Tabern	2	(England) Colin Lloyd	6
(England) Louis Blundell	6	(England) Louis Blundell	5
(England) James Wade	0			(England) Colin Lloyd	1
(England) Wayne Jones	6			(England) Dennis Priestley	6
(England) Mervyn King	3	(England) Wayne Jones	4
(England) Dennis Priestley	6	(England) Dennis Priestley	6
(Netherlands) Michael van Gerwen	2

=== Players Championship 8 ===
- Players Championship 8 at Brentwood Centre, Brentwood on 21 March

Quarter-finals		Semi-finals		Final
(England) Phil Taylor	6
(England) Terry Jenkins	5	(England) Phil Taylor	6
(England) Mark Walsh	6	(England) Mark Walsh	2
(England) Steve Beaton	1			(England) Phil Taylor	6
(Netherlands) Co Stompé	6			(England) Ronnie Baxter	2
(England) Mervyn King	0	(Netherlands) Co Stompé	3
(England) Ronnie Baxter	6	(England) Ronnie Baxter	6
(England) Alan Tabern	2

=== Players Championship 9 ===
- Players Championship 9 at the Coventry Arena, Coventry on 28 March

Quarter-finals		Semi-finals		Final
(England) Phil Taylor	6
(England) Mervyn King	2	(England) Phil Taylor	6
(Netherlands) Jan van der Rassel	6	(Netherlands) Jan van der Rassel	0
(England) Wayne Jones	2			(England) Phil Taylor	4
(England) Terry Jenkins	6			(England) Mark Walsh	6
(England) Dennis Priestley	3	(England) Terry Jenkins	2
(England) Mark Walsh	6	(England) Mark Walsh	6
(England) Steve Beaton	1

=== Players Championship 10 ===
- Players Championship 10 at van der Valk Hotel, Nuland on 4 April

Quarter-finals		Semi-finals		Final
(England) Phil Taylor	6
(England) Colin Osborne	2	(England) Phil Taylor	6
(England) Ronnie Baxter	6	(England) Ronnie Baxter	2
(England) Kevin Painter	4			(England) Phil Taylor	6
(Scotland) Gary Anderson	6			(Scotland) Gary Anderson	5
(England) Steve Brown	1	(Scotland) Gary Anderson	6
(England) Terry Jenkins	6	(England) Terry Jenkins	4
(Scotland) Robert Thornton	3

=== Players Championship 11 ===
- Players Championship 11 at van der Valk Hotel, Nuland on 5 April

Quarter-finals		Semi-finals		Final
(England) Phil Taylor	6
(England) Colin Osborne	1	(England) Phil Taylor	6
(England) Adrian Lewis	6	(England) Adrian Lewis	1
(England) Andy Jenkins	3			(England) Phil Taylor	6
(Scotland) Gary Anderson	6			(Scotland) Gary Anderson	2
(Netherlands) Vincent van der Voort	0	(Scotland) Gary Anderson	6
(England) Mark Walsh	6	(England) Mark Walsh	4
(Netherlands) Toon Greebe	5

=== Players Championship 12 ===
- Players Championship 12 at Wellsprings Leisure Centre, Taunton on 11 April

Quarter-finals		Semi-finals		Final
(Netherlands) Vincent van der Voort	6
(England) Mervyn King	0	(Netherlands) Vincent van der Voort	6
(England) Mark Walsh	6	(England) Mark Walsh	3
(England) Ronnie Baxter	2			(Netherlands) Vincent van der Voort	3
(England) Colin Osborne	6			(Netherlands) Michael van Gerwen	6
(England) Alan Tabern	4	(England) Colin Osborne	3
(Netherlands) Michael van Gerwen	6	(Netherlands) Michael van Gerwen	6
(Scotland) Robert Thornton	2

=== Players Championship 13 ===
- Players Championship 13 at the Moorway Centre, Derby on 18 April

Quarter-finals		Semi-finals		Final
(England) Colin Lloyd	6
(Netherlands) Raymond van Barneveld	5	(England) Colin Lloyd	6
(England) Ronnie Baxter	6	(England) Ronnie Baxter	4
(Wales) Mark Webster	4			(England) Colin Lloyd	4
(England) James Wade	6			(England) James Wade	6
(Netherlands) Co Stompé	5	(England) James Wade	6
(England) Colin Osborne	6	(England) Colin Osborne	4
(England) Wayne Jones	1

=== Players Championship 14 ===
- Players Championship 14 at the Newport Centre, Newport on 9 May

Quarter-finals		Semi-finals		Final
(England) Colin Osborne	6
(England) Justin Pipe	1	(England) Colin Osborne	1
(Scotland) Gary Anderson	6	(Scotland) Gary Anderson	6
(Netherlands) Jelle Klaasen	5			(Scotland) Gary Anderson	6
(England) Mervyn King	6			(England) Mervyn King	2
(England) James Wade	4	(England) Mervyn King	6
(England) Wayne Jones	6	(England) Wayne Jones	1
(Netherlands) Toon Greebe	5

=== Players Championship 15 ===
- Players Championship 15 at the Barnsley Metrodome, Barnsley on 13 June

Quarter-finals		Semi-finals		Final
(England) Colin Lloyd	6
(Netherlands) Vincent van der Voort	5	(England) Colin Lloyd	5
(England) Mark Walsh	6	(England) Mark Walsh	6
(England) Andy Jenkins	5			(England) Mark Walsh	6
(England) Colin Osborne	6			(England) Jamie Caven	4
(Scotland) Gary Anderson	4	(England) Colin Osborne	5
(England) Jamie Caven	6	(England) Jamie Caven	6
(England) Steve Beaton	5

=== Players Championship 16 ===
- Players Championship 16 at the Barnsley Metrodome, Barnsley on June 14.

Quarter-finals		Semi-finals		Final
(England) Wayne Mardle	6
(England) Mervyn King	2	(England) Wayne Mardle	4
(Scotland) Gary Anderson	6	(Scotland) Gary Anderson	6
(England) Steve Beaton	2			(Scotland) Gary Anderson	2
Paul Nicholson	6			(England) Colin Osborne	6
(England) Denis Ovens	4	(Australia) Paul Nicholson	2
(England) Colin Osborne	6	(England) Colin Osborne	6
(Scotland) Robert Thornton	3

=== Players Championship 17 ===
- Players Championship 17 at the Stadthalle Dinslaken, Dinslaken on 20 June

Quarter-finals		Semi-finals		Final
(England) Andy Smith	6
(England) Mark Walsh	5	(England) Andy Smith	6
(England) Joe Cullen	6	(England) Joe Cullen	3
(Netherlands) Vincent van der Voort	4			(England) Andy Smith	6
(England) Colin Lloyd	6			(England) Colin Lloyd	5
(England) Steve Beaton	2	(England) Colin Lloyd	6
(England) Wayne Jones	6	(England) Wayne Jones	1
(Canada) John Part	1

=== Players Championship 18 ===
- Players Championship 18 at the Stadthalle Dinslaken, Dinslaken on 21 June

Quarter-finals		Semi-finals		Final
(England) Mark Walsh	6
(Scotland) Gary Anderson	2	(England) Mark Walsh	6
(England) Ronnie Baxter	6	(England) Ronnie Baxter	5
(England) Colin Lloyd	2			(England) Mark Walsh	6
(England) Colin Osborne	6			(England) Andy Hamilton	5
(England) Terry Jenkins	2	(England) Colin Osborne	2
(England) Andy Hamilton	6	(England) Andy Hamilton	6
(Netherlands) Co Stompé	3

=== Players Championship 19 ===
- Players Championship 19 at the Mandalay Bay Resort, Las Vegas, Nevada on 30 June

Quarter-finals		Semi-finals		Final
(England) Phil Taylor	6
(England) Alan Tabern	4	(England) Phil Taylor	6
(Scotland) Gary Anderson	6	(Scotland) Gary Anderson	2
(England) James Wade	4			(England) Phil Taylor	2
(Scotland) Peter Wright	6			(England) Ronnie Baxter	6
(Netherlands) Co Stompé	3	(Scotland) Peter Wright	2
(England) Ronnie Baxter	6	(England) Ronnie Baxter	6
(Canada) John Part	3

=== Players Championship 20 ===
- Players Championship 20 at the Coogee Bay Hotel, Sydney on 9 August

Quarter-finals		Semi-finals		Final
(Scotland) Robert Thornton	6
(Australia) Brian Roach	4	(Scotland) Robert Thornton	6
(Australia) Simon Whitlock	6	(Australia) Simon Whitlock	1
(Australia) Shane Tichowitsch	5			(Scotland) Robert Thornton	1
(England) Mark Walsh	6			Paul Nicholson	6
(England) Steve Hine	3	(England) Mark Walsh	5
Paul Nicholson	6	Paul Nicholson	6
(Australia) Craig Prizeman	1

=== Players Championship 21 ===
- Players Championship 21 at the Hilton, London, Ontario on 16 August

Quarter-finals		Semi-finals		Final
(England) Dennis Priestley	6
(England) Andy Jenkins	1	(England) Dennis Priestley	6
(Netherlands) Roland Scholten	6	(Netherlands) Roland Scholten	2
(Canada) John Part	3			(England) Dennis Priestley	6
Paul Nicholson	6			(England) Wes Newton	4
(United States) Darin Young	1	(Australia) Paul Nicholson	4
Wes Newton	6	Wes Newton	6
(England) Terry Jenkins	3

=== Players Championship 22 ===
- Players Championship 22 at the Holiday Inn Select, Atlanta on 22 August

Quarter-finals		Semi-finals		Final
(United States) Darin Young	6
(Wales) Mark Webster	5	(United States) Darin Young	2
(England) James Wade	6	(England) James Wade	6
(England) Jamie Caven	4			(England) James Wade	2
(England) Mark Walsh	6			(England) Colin Lloyd	6
(Canada) Ken MacNeil	2	(England) Mark Walsh	0
(England) Colin Lloyd	6	(England) Colin Lloyd	6
(Netherlands) Roland Scholten	3

=== Players Championship 23 ===
- US Open Players Championship at the Holiday Inn Select, Atlanta on 23 August

Quarter-finals		Semi-finals		Final
Wes Newton	6
(England) Kirk Shepherd	2	(England) Wes Newton	2
(England) Andy Hamilton	6	(England) Andy Hamilton	6
(Scotland) Robert Thornton	1			(England) Andy Hamilton	3
(England) Dennis Priestley	6			(England) Dennis Priestley	6
(England) Peter Manley	1	(England) Dennis Priestley	6
(England) Alan Tabern	6	(England) Alan Tabern	2
(England) Terry Jenkins	0

=== Players Championship 24 ===
- Players Championship 24 at the Renaissance Hotel, Salzburg on 5 September

Quarter-finals		Semi-finals		Final
(England) Alan Tabern	6
(England) Mark Walsh	3	(England) Alan Tabern	5
(Spain) Carlos Rodriguez	6	(Spain) Carlos Rodriguez	6
(England) Wayne Jones	3			(Spain) Carlos Rodriguez	4
(England) Colin Osborne	6			(England) Adrian Lewis	6
(England) Kevin Painter	1	(England) Colin Osborne	4
(England) Adrian Lewis	6	(England) Adrian Lewis	6
(Germany) Michael Rosenauer	5

=== Players Championship 25 ===
- Players Championship 25 at the Renaissance Hotel, Salzburg on 6 September

Quarter-finals		Semi-finals		Final
(Netherlands) Vincent van der Voort	6
(England) Wes Newton	5	(Netherlands) Vincent van der Voort	3
(England) Steve Beaton	6	(England) Steve Beaton	6
(England) Wayne Jones	3			(England) Steve Beaton	2
(Northern Ireland) Brendan Dolan	6			(England) Jamie Caven	6
(England) Kirk Shepherd	5	(Northern Ireland) Brendan Dolan	2
(England) Jamie Caven	6	(England) Jamie Caven	6
(England) Kevin Painter	1

=== Players Championship 26 ===
- Players Championship 26 at the Citywest Hotel, Dublin on 3 October

Quarter-finals		Semi-finals		Final
(England) Phil Taylor	6
(England) Wes Newton	3	(England) Phil Taylor	3
(England) Andy Hamilton	6	(England) Andy Hamilton	6
(Northern Ireland) John MaGowan	3			(England) Andy Hamilton	4
(England) Wayne Jones	6			(England) Adrian Lewis	6
(England) Darren Johnson	5	(England) Wayne Jones	2
(England) Adrian Lewis	6	(England) Adrian Lewis	6
(England) Peter Manley	3

=== Players Championship 27 ===
- Players Championship 27 at the Citywest Hotel, Dublin on 4 October

Quarter-finals		Semi-finals		Final
Wes Newton	6
(England) Dennis Priestley	5	Wes Newton	6
(England) Jamie Caven	6	(England) Jamie Caven	5
(Netherlands) Vincent van der Voort	5			(England) Wes Newton	1
(England) Phil Taylor	6			(England) Phil Taylor	6
(England) Ronnie Baxter	2	(England) Phil Taylor	6
(England) Alan Tabern	6	(England) Alan Tabern	1
(England) James Wade	5

=== Players Championship 28 ===
- John McEvoy Gold Dart Classic at the National Event Centre, Killarney on 18 October

Quarter-finals		Semi-finals		Final
(England) Jamie Caven	6
(England) Wes Newton	5	(England) Jamie Caven	5
Paul Nicholson	6	Paul Nicholson	6
(England) Andy Jenkins	4			(Australia) Paul Nicholson	0
(England) Phil Taylor	6			(England) Phil Taylor	6
(England) Andy Hamilton	1	(England) Phil Taylor	6
(England) Wayne Jones	6	(England) Wayne Jones	2
(England) Mark Dudbridge	5

=== Players Championship 29 ===
- Players Championship 29 at van der Valk Hotel, Nuland on 24 October

Quarter-finals		Semi-finals		Final
(Netherlands) Vincent van der Voort	6
(England) Alan Tabern	4	(Netherlands) Vincent van der Voort	2
(England) Steve Beaton	6	(England) Steve Beaton	6
(England) Kevin Painter	4			(England) Steve Beaton	6
Wes Newton	6			(England) Wes Newton	1
(England) Chris Thompson	5	Wes Newton	6
(England) Adrian Lewis	6	(England) Adrian Lewis	4
(Scotland) Gary Anderson	3

=== Players Championship 30 ===
- Players Championship 30 at van der Valk Hotel, Nuland on 25 October

Quarter-finals		Semi-finals		Final
(England) James Wade	6
(Scotland) Peter Wright	3	(England) James Wade	6
(England) Colin Monk	6	(England) Colin Monk	3
(England) Andy Smith	5			(England) James Wade	6
(Northern Ireland) Brendan Dolan	6			(Northern Ireland) Brendan Dolan	2
(Scotland) Gary Anderson	5	(Northern Ireland) Brendan Dolan	6
(England) Mervyn King	6	(England) Mervyn King	0
(Scotland) Robert Thornton	3

=== Players Championship 31 ===
- Players Championship 31 at Magnum Leisure Centre, Irvine on 7 November

Quarter-finals		Semi-finals		Final
(England) Steve Beaton	6
(Netherlands) Vincent van der Voort	3	(England) Steve Beaton	6
(Scotland) Peter Wright	6	(Scotland) Peter Wright	5
(England) Steve Brown	4			(England) Steve Beaton	5
(England) Andy Smith	6			Wes Newton	6
(Scotland) Gary Anderson	2	(England) Andy Smith	3
Wes Newton	6	Wes Newton	6
(Northern Ireland) John MaGowan	3

=== Players Championship 32 ===
- Players Championship 32 at Magnum Leisure Centre, Irvine on 8 November

Quarter-finals		Semi-finals		Final
(England) Mark Walsh	6
(England) Dennis Priestley	1	(England) Mark Walsh	4
(England) Colin Osborne	6	(England) Colin Osborne	6
(Northern Ireland) Brendan Dolan	2			(England) Colin Osborne	6
(Netherlands) Michael van Gerwen	6			(Netherlands) Michael van Gerwen	4
(England) Steve Grubb	4	(Netherlands) Michael van Gerwen	6
(England) Steve Beaton	6	(England) Steve Beaton	3
(England) Dave Smith	3

== UK Open Regional Finals ==
(All matches – best of 11 legs)

- UK Open North-East Regional Final at The Dome Leisure Centre, Doncaster on January 11

Quarter-finals		Semi-finals		Final
(England) Jamie Caven	6
(England) Adrian Lewis	5	(England) Jamie Caven	2
(England) Colin Osborne	6	(England) Colin Osborne	6
(Netherlands) Jelle Klaasen	3			(England) Colin Osborne	1
(England) Kevin Painter	6			(England) Colin Lloyd	6
(England) Andy Jenkins	5	(England) Kevin Painter	1
(England) Colin Lloyd	6	(England) Colin Lloyd	6
(Wales) Wayne Atwood	1

- UK Open Scottish Regional Final at Magnum Leisure Centre, Irvine on March 8

Quarter-finals		Semi-finals		Final
(England) Dennis Priestley	6
(Netherlands) Jelle Klaasen	1	(England) Dennis Priestley	6
(England) Colin Osborne	6	(England) Colin Osborne	4
(England) Kevin Painter	0			(England) Dennis Priestley	2
(Wales) Mark Webster	6			(Scotland) Robert Thornton	6
(England) Lionel Sams	1	(Wales) Mark Webster	3
(Scotland) Robert Thornton	6	(Scotland) Robert Thornton	6
(England) Steve Maish	1

- UK Open North-West Regional Final at Robin Park Tennis Centre, Wigan on March 15

Quarter-finals		Semi-finals		Final
(Scotland) Robert Thornton	6
(England) Wayne Jones	4	(Scotland) Robert Thornton	3
(England) Kevin McDine	6	(England) Kevin McDine	6
(England) Paul Knighton	5			(England) Kevin McDine	3
(England) James Wade	6			(England) James Wade	6
(Netherlands) Jelle Klaasen	2	(England) James Wade	6
(England) Peter Manley	6	(England) Peter Manley	4
(England) Wayne Mardle	5

- UK Open South-East Regional Final at Brentwood Centre, Brentwood on March 22

Quarter-finals		Semi-finals		Final
(Netherlands) Michael van Gerwen	6
(Netherlands) Co Stompé	2	(Netherlands) Michael van Gerwen	1
(England) Phil Taylor	6	(England) Phil Taylor	6
(England) Colin Osborne	4			(England) Phil Taylor	6
(England) Mark Dudbridge	6			(England) Terry Jenkins	4
(England) Dennis Priestley	1	(England) Mark Dudbridge	5
(England) Terry Jenkins	6	(England) Terry Jenkins	6
(England) Robbie Parker	1

- UK Open West Midlands Regional Final at the Ricoh Arena, Coventry on March 29

Quarter-finals		Semi-finals		Final
(England) Dennis Priestley	6
(United States) Larry Butler	5	(England) Dennis Priestley	0
(England) Phil Taylor	6	(England) Phil Taylor	6
(Netherlands) Raymond van Barneveld	5			(England) Phil Taylor	6
(England) Wayne Jones	6			(England) Wayne Jones	5
(Northern Ireland) Brendan Dolan	5	(England) Wayne Jones	6
(England) Mark Walsh	6	(England) Mark Walsh	5
(England) Matt Clark	1

- UK Open South-West Regional at Wellsprings Leisure Centre, Taunton on April 12

Quarter-finals		Semi-finals		Final
(England) Phil Taylor	6
(Netherlands) Jelle Klaasen	2	(England) Phil Taylor	6
(Netherlands) Vincent van der Voort	6	(Netherlands) Vincent van der Voort	2
(England) Andy Jenkins	3			(England) Phil Taylor	6
(England) Andy Hamilton	6			(England) Andy Hamilton	0
(England) Michael Barnard	4	(England) Andy Hamilton	6
(England) Wayne Jones	6	(England) Wayne Jones	5
(England) Jamie Caven	4

- UK Open East Midlands Regional at the Moorway Centre, Derby on April 19

Quarter-finals		Semi-finals		Final
(England) Mark Walsh	6
(Netherlands) Co Stompé	4	(England) Mark Walsh	6
(England) Ken Dobson	6	(England) Ken Dobson	2
(England) Jamie Caven	4			(England) Mark Walsh	6
(England) Mark Dudbridge	6			(Netherlands) Raymond van Barneveld	5
(England) Lionel Sams	1	(England) Mark Dudbridge	5
(Netherlands) Raymond van Barneveld	6	(Netherlands) Raymond van Barneveld	6
(Netherlands) Vincent van der Voort	1

- UK Open Welsh Regional at the Newport Centre, Newport on May 10

Quarter-finals		Semi-finals		Final
(Netherlands) Co Stompé	6
(England) Steve Beaton	5	(Netherlands) Co Stompé	2
(England) Jamie Caven	6	(England) Jamie Caven	6
(England) Mark Dudbridge	3			(England) Jamie Caven	6
(England) Colin Lloyd	6			(England) Alan Tabern	5
(England) Mark Walsh	2	(England) Colin Lloyd	4
(England) Alan Tabern	6	(England) Alan Tabern	6
(England) Peter Manley	2

== German Darts Corporation ==
The German Darts Corporation rankings are calculated from events across Germany, Austria and Switzerland. The top player in the rankings automatically qualifies for the 2010 World Championship.

No.	Date	Also known as	Winner	Legs	Runner-up	Ref.
1	Saturday 28 March	GDC Ramada Hotel Koln 1	Jyhan Artut (Germany)	6–2	(Germany) Andree Welge	
2	Sunday 29 March	GDC Ramada Hotel Koln 2	Jyhan Artut (Germany)	6–4	(Germany) Tomas Seyler	

== Australian Grand Prix Pro Tour ==
The Australian Grand Prix rankings are calculated from events across Australia. The top player in the rankings automatically qualifies for the 2010 World Championship.

No.	Date	Also known as	Winner	Legs	Runner-up	Ref.
1	Sunday 25 January	Punchbowl Open	Paul Nicholson (Australia)	beat	(Australia) Brian Roach	
2	Sunday 22 February	DPA Australian Matchplay	Paul Nicholson (Australia)	8–5	(Australia) Steve McArthur	
3	Saturday 14 March	NDDA Open 1	Rob Modra (Australia)	6–2	(Australia) Alan Ritchie	
4	Sunday 15 March	NDDA Open 2	Raymond O'Donnell (Australia)	beat	(Australia) Rob Modra	
5	Saturday 28 March	Gaels Club Open 1	Brian Roach (Australia)	6–5	(Australia) Barry Jouannet Jr	
6	Sunday 29 March	Gaels Club Open 2	Barry Jouannet Jr (Australia)	7–4	(Australia) Jerry Weyman	
7	Saturday 11 April	Victoria Open 1	Scott Krause (Australia)	7–4	(Australia) Steve Duke Jr	
8	Sunday 12 April	Victoria Open 2	Raymond O'Donnell (Australia)	7–4	(Australia) Steve Duke Jr	
9	Saturday 2 May	Goulburn Open 1	Simon Whitlock (Australia)	7–5	(Australia) Steve McArthur	
10	Sunday 3 May	Goulburn Open 2	Simon Whitlock (Australia)	7–2	(Australia) Russell Stewart	
11	Sunday 10 May	Viva Las Vegas NZ	Simon Whitlock (Australia)	7–5	(New Zealand) Phillip Hazel	
12	Sunday 24 May	Queensland Open	Simon Whitlock (Australia)	7–4	(Australia) Shane Tichowitsch	
13	Saturday 6 June	Criterion Hotel Open	Simon Whitlock (Australia)	7–6	(Australia) Phil Bottrell	
14	Sunday 7 June	Russell Stewart Classic	Simon Whitlock (Australia)	7–3	(Australia) Russell Stewart	
15	Sunday 21 June	Mittagong RSL Open	Simon Whitlock (Australia)	8–2	(Australia) Kevin Luland	
16	Sunday 19 July	Southern Illawarra Open	Simon Whitlock (Australia)	7–3	(Australia) Jerry Weyman	
17	Saturday 1 August	Illawarra Yacht Club Classic 1	Simon Whitlock (Australia)	7–3	(Australia) Paul Nicholson	
18	Sunday 2 August	Illawarra Yacht Club Classic 2	Simon Whitlock (Australia)	7–2	(Australia) Paul Nicholson	
19	Sunday 9 August	Australian Open Players Championship	Paul Nicholson (Australia)	6–1	(Scotland) Robert Thornton	
20	Saturday 5 September	Mildura Workers Club Open 1	Simon Whitlock (Australia)	7–4	(Australia) Daniel Sim	
21	Sunday 6 September	Mildura Workers Club Open 2	Lindsay Wells (Australia)	7–2	(Australia) Rob Modra	

== Other PDC tournaments ==
The PDC also held a number of other tournaments during 2009. These were mainly smaller events with low prize money, and some had eligibility restrictions. All of these tournaments were non-ranking.

Date	Event	Winner	Score	Runner-Up
May 31	North American Darts Championship	(United States) Scott Burnett	6–3	(United States) Darin Young
July 11	PDC World New Zealand Qualifying Event	(New Zealand) Phillip Hazel	beat	(New Zealand) Bernie Smith
August 23	Tom Kirby Memorial Trophy	(Republic of Ireland) Aodhagan O'Neill	7–3	(Republic of Ireland) William O'Connor
September 26	Emperors Palace South African Open	(South Africa) Les Francis	4–3	(South Africa) Devon Petersen
September 27	Emperors Palace South African Masters	(England) Phil Taylor	6–4	(England) James Wade
October 17	Gleneagle Irish Masters	(England) Phil Taylor	6–1	(England) Wayne Jones
October 18	PDC World Spain Qualifying Event	(Spain) Francisco Ruiz	6–2	(Spain) Julio Barbero
October 25	Oceanic Masters	(New Zealand) Warren Parry	7–1	(New Zealand) Preston Ridd
October 25	PDC World Japan Qualifying Event	(Japan) Haruki Muramatsu	6–2	(Japan) Morihiro Hashimoto
November 6	PDC World East European Qualifying Event	(Slovenia) Osmann Kijamet	6–3	(Slovenia) Sebastijan Pecjak
November 7	Caribbean and South American Masters	(Guyana) Norman Madhoo	5–3	(Barbados) Anthony Forde
November 7	PDC World Philippines Qualifying Event	(Philippines) Ian Perez	beat	(Philippines) Rizal Barellano
November 14	PDC World Finland Qualifying Event	(Finland) Jarkko Komula	3–1	(Finland) Vesa Nuutinen
November 14	PDC World Germany Qualifying Event	(Germany) Tomas Seyler	6–1	(Germany) Michael Rosenauer
November 14	PDC World Sweden Qualifying Event	(Sweden) Magnus Caris	7–3	(Sweden) Jonas Karstrom
November 21	PDC World Poland Qualifying Event	(Poland) Krzysztof Kciuk	6–1	(Poland) Tomasz Mikołajczyk
November 28	PDC World Russia Qualifying Event	(Russia) Roman Konchikov	7–3	(Russia) Anastasia Dobromyslova
