= 2009 Las Vegas Desert Classic =

2009 partypoker.com Las Vegas Desert Classic

Tournament information
- Dates: 1–5 July 2009
- Venue: Mandalay Bay Resort
- Location: Las Vegas, Nevada
- Country: United States
- Organisation(s): PDC
- Format: Legs; Final – best of 25
- Prize fund: £182,000
- Winner's share: £30,000
- High checkout: 164 Adrian Lewis (ENG)

Champion(s)
- Phil Taylor (ENG)

The 2009 Las Vegas Desert Classic (officially the 2009 PartyPoker.com Las Vegas Desert Classic for sponsorship) was a professional darts tournament staged from July 1 to July 5, 2009 at the Mandalay Bay Resort in Las Vegas, Nevada. It was the eighth and final staging of the event since the original 2002 edition, and the fourth time it took place at the Mandalay Bay Resort. The tournament was the third of five Professional Darts Corporation (PDC) premier events in the 2009 season. Online gambling website PartyPower.com sponsored the tournament broadcast on Sky Sports.

Phil Taylor, the tournament's defending champion, defeated Raymond van Barneveld by 13 legs to 11 in the final, winning the fifth Las Vegas Desert Classic tournament of his career. He defeated qualifier Jamie Caven in the first round, Dennis Priestley in the second round, Gary Anderson in the quarter-finals and John Part in the semi-finals. Adrian Lewis achieved the tournament's highest checkout, a 164, in the final leg of his first round match against Vincent van der Voort.

== Background and format ==
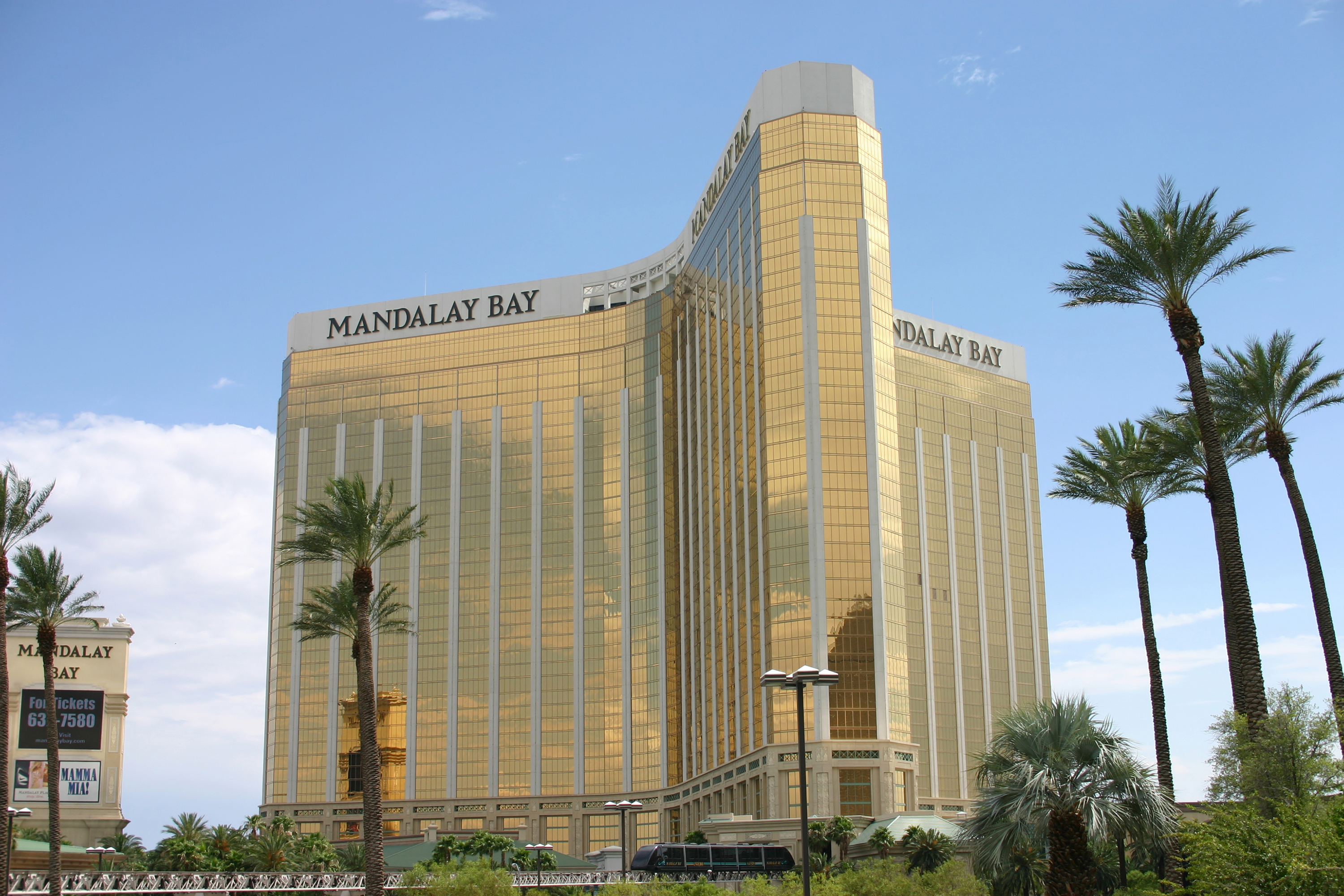
The Mandalay Bay Resort, where the tournament was held

The Professional Darts Corporation (PDC) began the Las Vegas Desert Classic in 2002 as its first live televised darts competition in the United States. Players considered the tournament difficult to play because matches were held early in the morning for a European broadcast. The 2009 tournament was held between July 1 to July 5, in Las Vegas, Nevada, and was the third of the five PDC-sanctioned premier events in the 2009 season. This was the final year PDC staged the competition because of a lack of public interest. It was the eighth edition of the tournament and featured a 32-player main draw held at the Mandalay Bay Resort for the fourth successive year.

A total of 20 players, 16 from the PDC Order of Merit following the 2009 UK Open and 4 from the North American Order of Merit, automatically qualified for the main draw. There were 8 seeds assigned according to the PDC Order of Merit after the UK Open: Phil Taylor was seeded first, with James Wade seeded second. Two five-round qualifying tournaments held at the Mandalay Bay Resort from June 28 to 29 decided the remaining 12 places. The maximum number of legs played in a match increased from 11 in the first round to 15 in the second, 19 in the quarter-final, and 21 in the semi-finals leading up to the best-of-25 legs final. (Note: Each leg was played from a maximum of 501 points.) Sponsored by the online gambling website PartyPower.com, and broadcast on Sky Sports, it had a total prize fund of £200,000.

Bookmakers installed Taylor as the favorite to win the tournament. Taylor, who hurt his back as he rode a bicycle two weeks before the event, commented on his chances: "It's going to bring the best out of me. It's what I do for a living. It's my job. I'll play well the rest of the week, especially after getting beat [Tuesday] in a final."

=== Prize fund ===
The breakdown of the 2009 prize money is shown below:

- Winner: £30,000
- Runner-up: £15,000
- Semi-finalists (×2): £10,000
- Quarter-finalists (×4): £7,250
- Last 16 (×8): £5,000
- Last 32 (×16): £3,000
- Fifth round qualifying losers (×6): £1,000
- Fourth round qualifying losers (×12): £250
- Nine-dart checkout: £10,000
- Total: £200,000

== Tournament summary ==
=== Qualification ===
The two qualifying rounds were held on June 28 and 29. Nearly 200 players had applied to enter by the June 24 deadline. The qualifying draw was conducted at 11:00 local time on June 28. All matches were best-of-9 legs, and the first round was played on a 24-board setup in the arena. Players were assigned to six groups and each group winner qualified for the main draw. Both qualifying tournaments featured 24 seeds. The losing players from the first tournament entered the second on June 29 to determine the other six main draw entrants.

Jelle Klaasen beat Mark Webster, a former BDO world champion, James Barton and Dennis Smith with checkouts of 146 and 149 in the final two legs of his fifth round match to qualify. Fellow Dutchman Vincent van der Voort was the second qualifier, defeating Louis Blundell, Ian Jopling, Ken MacNeil and Tony Eccles. Co Stompé achieved two 5–0 whitewashes before beating Jacko Barry 5–2, Michael van Gerwen 5–4 and whitewashing Nick Fullwell to qualify. Peter Wright, who entered the top 100 in 2009, beat Andy Smith 5–3 to debut in the tournament. Simon Whitlock, who was undefeated on the 2009 DartPlayers Australia circuit, won his first three matches over Chris Edwards, Bernard Prenter and Gary Mawson without losing a leg before beating Mark Dudbridge and Barrie Bates to return to PDC competition. Jamie Caven made 14, 11 and 13-dart finishes in his 5–4 victory over Shane O'Connor, becoming the last player to qualify from the first day's play.

Peter Manley, the 2003 winner, entered the main draw by whitewashing Bryan de Hoog 5–0. Colin Monk recovered from losing in the second round of the first qualifiers to defeat Ken MacNeil 5–3 in the final round of the second competition. Two-time Las Vegas Desert Classic semi-finalist Wes Newton beat Graham Warburton, Mark Carter, Paul Lim and Roland Scholten to qualify. Gary Anderson beat Dudbridge and Sam Rooney to qualify, and Phillip Hazel and Blundell made their televised debuts after final round wins over Barrie Bates and Mark Lawrence, respectively.

=== Round 1 ===
The draw for the first round of the championship was conducted in the Islander Ballroom at the Mandalay Bay Resort on the evening of June 30. The first round of the event, in which the 12 PDC Order of Merit and four North America Order of America entrants played the 12 qualifiers, was held between July 1 and 2. Dennis Priestley won 6–1 over Monk and Newton beat Alan Tabern 6–3. Colin Lloyd, who had lost in the first round of the last three Las Vegas tournaments, beat Wright 6–3. Ronnie Baxter, a UK Open semi-finalist and Las Vegas Players' Championship winner, lost 6–2 to Klaasen. Terry Jenkins, the losing finalist at the 2007 event, defeated qualifier Whitlock 6–1, and Taylor played through his back trouble to average 102 in his 6–3 win over Caven.

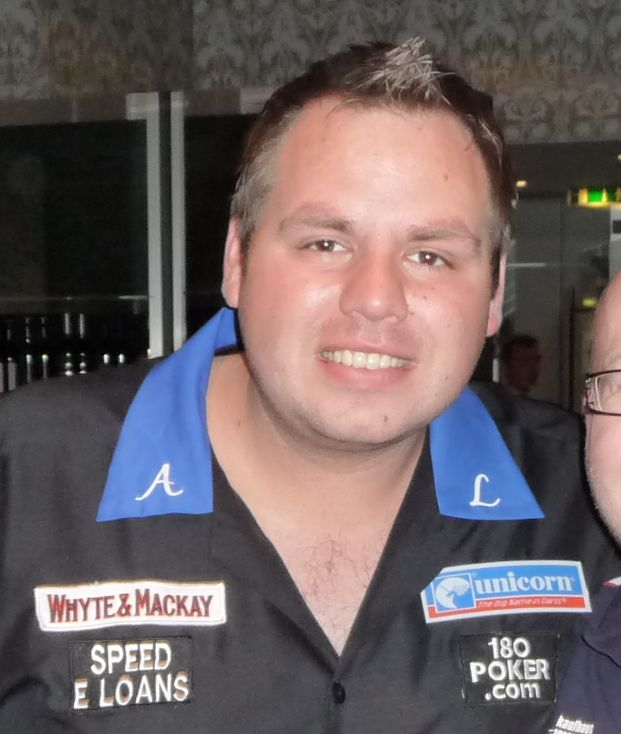
Adrian Lewis (pictured in 2011) produced the tournament's highest checkout of 164 in the first round

Anderson went into his game against Wayne Mardle requiring treatment for an allergic reaction to an energy drink he had the day before and hit six out of seven tries at a double ring to win 6–2. John Part, the 2006 winner, defeated the North American Darts Championship victor Scott Burnett 6–2. Part took a 4–0 lead from finishes of 117 and 90 points and 14 darts before finishes on the double 16 and double 10 rings from Burnett on his television debut made the score 4–2. Part took legs seven and eight to enter the second round. Mervyn King began his third Las Vegas campaign by winning 6–3 against Blundell. Tied at 3–3, King finished on the double 13 ring to take the lead and made an 11-dart finish in leg eight and finishing on the double four ring in the ninth leg to win after Blundell missed three times.

Andy Hamilton, a 2008 quarter-finalist, led 4–0 over Chris White before the latter won leg five after Hamilton missed a double ring three times. Hamilton took the next two legs to win 6–1. Manley requited him falling out of the world's top 16 by defeating Mark Walsh 6–4. Both players shared the first four legs before a 106 checkout and finishes on the bullseye, double eight and 12 rings gave Manley the victory. Stompé beat Colin Osborne 6–4; Stompé led 3–1 after Osborne missed four darts at a double ring before Osborne tied the match at 4–4. He prevented a final leg decider by winning leg 10 after 13 darts.

Raymond van Barneveld won the first two legs of his match against Bill Davis, who claimed the third on the double 10 ring. Van Barneveld took the next two legs before Davis used the former's missed 124 finish to claim leg six. Van Barneveld had finishes on the double 16 and nine rings for a 6–2 victory. Wade, the 2009 Premier League Darts champion, overturned a 3–3 tie with Hazel from missed hits at a double ring to enter the second round with a 6–3 win from finishes on the double 20 and 9 rings. Adrian Lewis beat Van Der Voort 6–5 in a closely contested game. Both players took turns to lead the match, which went to a final leg decider won by Lewis on the bullseye ring from a 164 checkout. In the final first round match, Kevin Painter came from tying 2–2 with Darin Young to claim four successive legs and win 6–2.

=== Round 2 ===
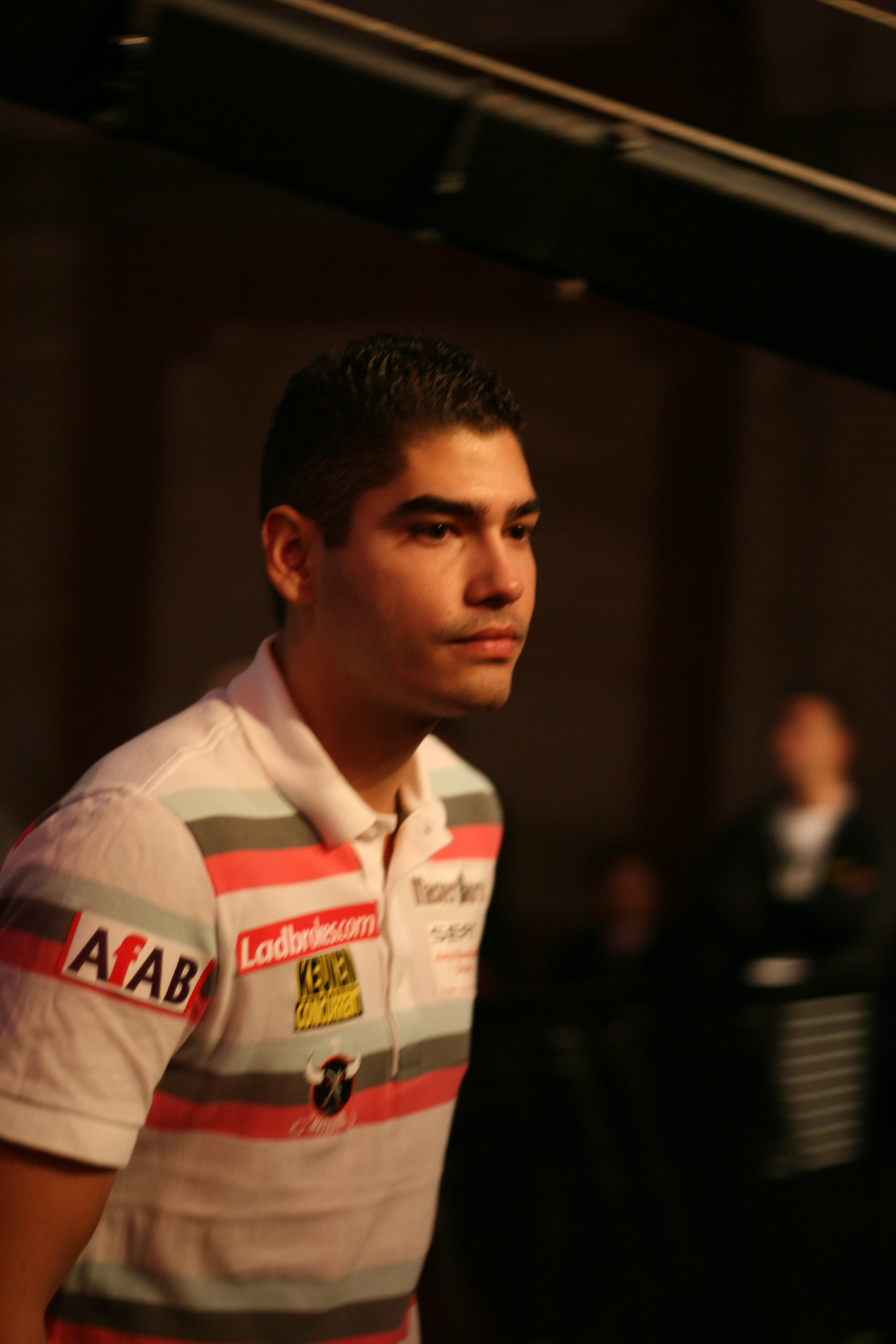
Jelle Klaasen (pictured in 2007) was knocked out of the competition in the second round by John Part

The second round on July 3 consisted of eight 15-leg matches. Wade became the first player to go through to the quarter-finals with an 8–4 win over Hamilton. The match began with Hamilton leading 2–1 before Wade won four legs in a row to go ahead 5–2. Hamilton went 6–4 behind before Wade completed the victory. Taylor whitewashed Priestley, who had two chances at a double ring, 8–0. Taylor said post-match he felt uncomfortable, and it was hard to whitewash another professional player. Lewis beat Manley 8–1 in their third meeting in Las Vegas. Manley took the first leg after Lewis twice missed the double 20 ring. Lewis achieved five maximum scores and used errors from Manley to seal the victory. Part and Klaasen played the fourth second-round match exchanging the lead four times. They went to a final leg decider. Klaasen failed to hit the bullseye ring to complete an 84 checkout and Part finished with an 80-point checkout on the double ten ring to claim an 8–7 victory and remain unbeaten in meetings against his opponent.

Anderson contested the fifth second-round match with Newton. Anderson opened a 4–0 advantage, before he missed six darts to lead 5–0, with Newton hitting the double eight ring to claim the fifth leg. Finishes on the double eight and four rings gave Anderson two more legs, which Newton followed by clinching the following two legs. Three missed chances to hit a double by Newton allowed Anderson to win 8–3. Van Barneveld played fellow Dutchman Stompé and led 5–2 when he failed to achieve a nine-dart finish in winning the eighth leg after his ninth dart missed the double 12 ring. He then won the next three legs to win 8–2, and extended his unbeaten career wins record against Stompé. Jenkins faced Lloyd and took a 3–0 lead. He twice failed to win the fourth leg that Lloyd took on the double four ring. Jenkins struck the double top ring for a 4–1 lead before Lloyd won two legs in a row to be 4–3 behind. Jenkins clinched the next four legs to go through to the quarter-finals by 8–4. The final second-round match saw King and Painter go to a final leg decider won by King 8–7 on a 13-dart finish.

=== Quarter-finals ===
The four quarter-finals were played as best-of-19 legs on July 4; the start was delayed by 40 minutes because of the need to reestablish a television feed with Sky Sports in the United Kingdom. Part played Jenkins in the first quarter-final. Part achieved checkouts of 112 and 78 to take a 3–0 lead. An 88 checkout gave Jenkins the fourth leg, and he hit the double 14 ring to go 3–2 behind. Part won four frames in a row before Jenkins claimed six of the next eight to be 9–8 behind. Part won the 18th leg on the double four ring to win the match 10–8. Van Barneveld was drawn against King in the second quarter-final. Van Barneveld took a 6–0 lead with two 13-dart finishes and hitting the double 20 and 16 rings. King won a single leg in the seventh from a maximum score and hitting the double 16 ring to stop him being whitewashed. Van Barneveld won 10–1 to eliminate King from the quarter-finals for the second time in three years with three 13-dart finishes in succession. Van Barneveld, who averaged 104 points in the match, said: "10–1 was a great result but I never thought it would be that easy. I'm happy with this win and hopefully I can play well again on Sunday."

Anderson and Taylor were the two players in the third quarter-final. Taylor took the first leg with a 13-dart finish before Anderson won the next two legs to go ahead 3–1. The match went to 4–4 until Taylor made it 6–4 and later 8–5. Anderson made a 84 checkout to lower the deficit before Taylor prevented him from making a 61 checkout in the 14th leg, which he won. A 14-dart finish and hitting the double 20 ring gave Taylor a 10–6 victory. The final quarter-final match was between Lewis and Wade. Wade held a 3–1 lead, and hit the double 20 ring in two of the next three legs to move 5–4 ahead. Wade prevented Lewis from tying the game at 5–5 by finishing the 10th leg on the double 20 ring before Lewis took the 11 on the double eight ring. He then clinched three legs in succession to move within one leg of victory at 9–5. Lewis struck the double 19 ring which kept him in contention until Wade finished on the double 11 ring to win the match 10–6 and the final semi-final berth. Wade said it was not "a vintage performance" against Lewis and called it "a battle and I came through it".

=== Semi-finals and final ===
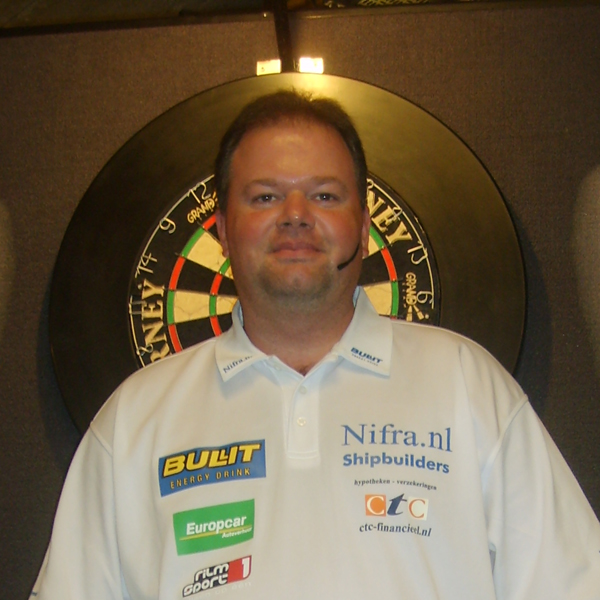
Raymond van Barneveld (pictured in 2006) was one of the two finalists at the tournament

Both of the semi-finals took place on July 5 and were best-of-21 legs. The first semi-final was between Taylor and Part. Taylor began with a failed attempt to achieve a nine-dart finish in the first leg, which he finished in ten dart throws. Part claimed the second leg with a 117 checkout before Taylor made a 13-dart finish to break the tie. Taylor won the next two legs and used an error by Part in leg five to go 4–1 ahead. Taylor won the remaining six legs to win the match 10–1 with an average of near to 108 and went through to the final; he had a second try at achieving a nine-dart finish by hitting two consecutive maximum scores, but he missed the eighth throw. Taylor said he was delighted to qualify for the final and that he had taken advantage of Part's poor play.

Van Barneveld faced Wade in the other semi-final. Wade took a 2–1 advantage, which Van Barneveld cancelled out with eight of the nine following legs. Wade hit the double ten and eight rings to lower his deficit to Van Barneveld before the latter hit the double 16 ring to be within one leg of reaching the final. A finish on the double six ring allowed Wade to reduce the deficit by one leg before Van Barneveld finished on the double 16 ring to win 10–6 and requite his loss to Wade in the semi-final of the Premier League Darts. Post-match, Van Barneveld said he was relaxed throughout the competition and praised the quality of play. He said he was unhappy not to reach the final of the Premier League Darts but believed he could win the Las Vegas Desert Classic, adding: "Phil will have to play his best darts to beat me."

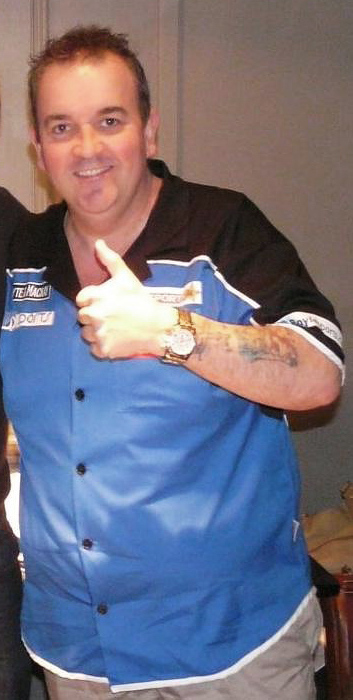
Phil Taylor defeated Van Barneveld to win the fifth Las Vegas Desert Classic of his career.

The best-of-25 legs final between Taylor and Van Barneveld was held on the afternoon of July 5 before almost 1,000 people. The Sky Sports team called the match "a dream final"; the two finalists were ranked first and third in the PDC Order of Merit and noted they had not played each other in a long time since Van Barneveld played in the British Darts Organisation. Eric Bristow, a Sky Sports commentator, observed that Van Barneveld would have to "play at his very, very, very best" to defeat Taylor.

The final began Taylor winning the first leg on a 13-dart finish. Taylor led 3–0 after Van Barneveld could not strike the double 18 ring in the third leg. Van Barneveld entered the first interval 3–2 behind Taylor with consecutive finishes on the bullseye ring. He achieved two successive 11-dart finishes to lead Taylor 4–3 and won a fifth leg in a row on the double two ring. Taylor won the next four legs to reclaim the lead before Van Barneveld finished the double 18 ring in a 13-dart finish to tie the score. Taylor retook the lead with five legs in succession to hold a 11–7 advantage. Van Barneveld won the next three legs before Taylor made an 11-dart finish to be within a leg of victory. Van Barneveld finished on the double 16 ring to win an 11th leg and leg 24 saw Taylor obtain a checkout of 104 to win the match 13–11.

It was Taylor's fifth Las Vegas Desert Classic win, and the third time he had beaten Van Barneveld in the final of a major competition. He earned £30,000 prize money for winning the tournament. Taylor commented on his success: "I'm delighted. It was a super final to be involved in and, in the end, I broke his spirit I think." He added, "Raymond raised his game and there were times during the early stages when I wasn't even getting a chance at a double." Van Barneveld said he was disappointed to have lost in the final. Van Barneveld left the arena upset and his friend apologised to the tournament director for his behaviour.

== Draw ==
Numbers to the left of players' names show the seedings for the tournament's top eight players. The 12 non-automatic qualifiers are indicated by a (Q). The figures in brackets to the right of a competitor's name state their three-dart averages in a match. Names in bold denote match winners of the main draw.

First round 1–2 July best of 11 legs
1	**Phil Taylor** (ENG) 97.97	**6**
Q	Jamie Caven (ENG) 101.60	3
**Dennis Priestley** (ENG) 86.52	**6**
Q	Colin Monk (ENG) 86.75	1
8	Alan Tabern (ENG) 90.28	3
Q	**Wes Newton** (ENG) 87.39	**6**
Wayne Mardle (ENG) 94.39	2
Q	**Gary Anderson** (SCO) 96.57	**6**
4	**John Part** (CAN) 84.96	**6**
Scott Burnett (USA) 81.11	2
Ronnie Baxter (ENG) 92.68	2
Q	**Jelle Klaasen** (NED) 93.10	**6**
5	**Terry Jenkins** (ENG) 94.16	**6**
Q	Simon Whitlock (AUS) 87.84	1
**Colin Lloyd** (ENG) 90.06	**6**
Q	Peter Wright (SCO) 86.81	3
2	**James Wade** (ENG) 89.37	**6**
Q	Phillip Hazel (NZL) 85.44	3
**Andy Hamilton** (ENG) 87.57	**6**
Chris White (USA) 74.42	1
7	**Adrian Lewis** (ENG) 100.57	**6**
Q	Vincent van der Voort (NED) 93.69	5
Mark Walsh (ENG) 95.62	4
Q	**Peter Manley** (ENG) 91.34	**6**
3	**Raymond van Barneveld** (NED) 95.47	**6**
Bill Davis (USA) 83.34	2
Colin Osborne (ENG) 87.52	4
Q	**Co Stompé** (NED) 94.99	**6**
6	**Mervyn King** (ENG) 87.99	**6**
Q	Louis Blundell (ENG) 79.55	3
**Kevin Painter** (ENG) 92.43	**6**
Darin Young (USA) 88.92	2

Second round 3 July best of 15 legs
1	(England) **Phil Taylor** 101.90	**8**
(England) Dennis Priestley 87.36	0
Q	(England) Wes Newton 89.98	3
Q	(Scotland) **Gary Anderson** 91.26	**8**
4	(Canada) **John Part** 87.60	**8**
(Netherlands) Jelle Klaasen 92.03	7
5	(England) **Terry Jenkins** 102.62	**8**
(England) Colin Lloyd 93.17	3
2	(England) **James Wade** 97.25	**8**
(England) Andy Hamilton 92.17	4
7	(England) **Adrian Lewis** 89.98	**8**
Q	(England) Peter Manley 84.08	1
3	(Netherlands) **Raymond van Barneveld** 94.83	**8**
Q	(Netherlands) Co Stompé 87.32	2
6	(England) **Mervyn King** 95.66	**8**
(England) Kevin Painter 95.66	7

Quarter-finals; 4 July best of 19 legs
1	(England) **Phil Taylor** 104.94	**10**
Q	(Scotland) Gary Anderson 98.14	6
4	(Canada) **John Part** 93.84	**10**
5	(England) Terry Jenkins 92.08	8
2	(England) **James Wade** 94.90	**10**
7	(England) Adrian Lewis 92.22	6
3	(Netherlands) **Raymond van Barneveld** 103.23	**10**
6	(England) Mervyn King 92.92	1

Semi-finals; 5 July best of 21 legs
1	(England) **Phil Taylor** 107.82	**11**
4	(Canada) John Part 92.59	1
2	(England) James Wade 93.67	6
3	(Netherlands) **Raymond van Barneveld** 100.31	**11**

Final; 5 July best of 25 legs
1	(England) **Phil Taylor** 102.21	**13**
3	(Netherlands) Raymond van Barneveld 98.52	11
