= 2009 European Championship (darts) =

2009 PartyPoker.net European Championship

Tournament information
- Dates: 29 October–1 November 2009
- Venue: Claus Event Center
- Location: Hoofddorp
- Country: Netherlands
- Organisation(s): PDC
- Format: Legs; Final – best of 21
- Prize fund: £200,000
- Winner's share: £50,000
- High checkout: 170 (Netherlands) Michael van Gerwen

Champion(s)
- (England) Phil Taylor

The 2009 PartyPoker.net European Championship was the second edition of the PDC tournament, the European Championship, which allows the top European players to compete against the highest ranked players from the PDC Order of Merit. The tournament took place from 29 October–1 November 2009 at the Claus Event Center in Hoofddorp, Netherlands. It featured a field of 32 players and £200,000 in prize money, with £50,000 going to the winner.

World number one and defending champion Phil Taylor successfully defended his title, defeating Steve Beaton 11–3 in the final with a record tournament average of 111.54.

== Prize money ==
Position (no. of players)		Prize money (Total: £200,000)
Winner	(1)	£50,000
Runner-Up	(1)	£20,000
Semi-finalists	(2)	£10,000
Quarter-finalists	(4)	£7,500
Last 16 (second round)	(8)	£5,000
Last 32 (first round)	(16)	£2,500

== Qualification ==
The top 16 players from the PDC Order of Merit after the Players Championship double-header in Nuland automatically qualified for the event. The top 8 from these rankings were also the seeded players. The remaining 16 places went to the top 8 non-qualified players from the 2009 Players Championship Order of Merit, and then to the top 8 non-qualified players from the 2009 Continental Europe Order of Merit.

PDC Top 16
1. (England) Phil Taylor (champion)
2. (Netherlands) Raymond van Barneveld (second round)
3. (England) James Wade (semi-finals)
4. (Canada) John Part (first round)
5. (England) Terry Jenkins (first round)
6. (England) Mervyn King (quarter-finals)
7. (England) Adrian Lewis (first round)
8. (England) Ronnie Baxter (second round)
9. (England) Dennis Priestley (first round)
10. (England) Colin Lloyd (quarter-finals)
11. (England) Alan Tabern (first round)
12. (England) Mark Walsh (quarter-finals)
13. (England) Colin Osborne (second round)
14. (England) Andy Hamilton (second round)
15. (England) Kevin Painter (first round)
16. (Scotland) Robert Thornton (second round)

Players Championship qualifiers
1. (Scotland) Gary Anderson (quarter-finals)
2. (England) Steve Beaton (runner-up)
3. (England) Jamie Caven (second round)
4. (England) Wes Newton (first round)
5. (England) Wayne Jones (first round)
6. (Netherlands) Vincent van der Voort (first round)
7. (Australia) Paul Nicholson (first round)
8. (England) Andy Smith (first round)

European qualifiers
1. (Netherlands) Co Stompé (first round)
2. (Spain) Carlos Rodríguez (first round)
3. (Netherlands) Jelle Klaasen (semi-finals)
4. (Netherlands) Michael van Gerwen (second round)
5. (Netherlands) Toon Greebe (first round)
6. (Austria) Mensur Suljović (second round)
7. (Netherlands) Remco van Eijden (first round)
8. (Netherlands) Roland Scholten (first round)

== Draw and results ==
Draw and schedule of play as follows:

First round (best of 11 legs); 29–30 October
1	(England) Phil Taylor 111.03	6
(Netherlands) Toon Greebe 93.31	2
(England) Wes Newton 88.40	4
(Scotland) Robert Thornton 103.04	6
8	(England) Ronnie Baxter 94.78	6
(England) Andy Smith 93.65	2
(Netherlands) Co Stompé 88.07	5
(Scotland) Gary Anderson 93.00	6
5	(England) Terry Jenkins 90.29	4
(England) Jamie Caven 93.30	6
(England) Wayne Jones 86.40	2
(Netherlands) Jelle Klaasen 93.31	6
4	(Canada) John Part 92.27	5
(England) Colin Lloyd 92.90	6
(Austria) Mensur Suljović 93.24	6
(Netherlands) Roland Scholten 87.92	3
2	(Netherlands) Raymond van Barneveld 92.91	6
(England) Dennis Priestley 87.51	5
(England) Kevin Painter 85.35	4
(England) Mark Walsh 84.90	6
7	(England) Adrian Lewis 89.68	2
(England) Steve Beaton 94.17	6
(Netherlands) Michael van Gerwen 86.32	6
(Netherlands) Vincent van der Voort 93.58	2
6	(England) Mervyn King 84.50	6
(Spain) Carlos Rodríguez 84.97	5
(England) Colin Osborne 89.13	6
(Australia) Paul Nicholson 89.18	2
3	(England) James Wade 90.59	6
(England) Alan Tabern 89.60	4
(England) Andy Hamilton 95.30	6
(Netherlands) Remco van Eijden 83.35	3

Second round (best of 17 legs); 31 October
1	(England) Phil Taylor 110.88	9
(Scotland) Robert Thornton 83.24	0
8	(England) Ronnie Baxter 83.58	1
(Scotland) Gary Anderson 93.56	9
(England) Jamie Caven 92.00	8
(Netherlands) Jelle Klaasen 96.21	9
(England) Colin Lloyd 104.00	9
(Austria) Mensur Suljović 91.50	5
2	(Netherlands) Raymond van Barneveld 96.38	7
(England) Mark Walsh 97.45	9
(England) Steve Beaton 84.84	9
(Netherlands) Michael van Gerwen 82.70	7
6	(England) Mervyn King 104.00	9
(England) Colin Osborne 101.80	6
3	(England) James Wade 100.19	9
(England) Andy Hamilton 94.66	5

Quarter-finals (best of 19 legs); 1 November
1	(England) Phil Taylor 118.14	10
(Scotland) Gary Anderson 106.12	3
(Netherlands) Jelle Klaasen 97.49	10
(England) Colin Lloyd 96.98	5
(England) Mark Walsh 93.29	6
(England) Steve Beaton 97.26	10
6	(England) Mervyn King 99.20	6
3	(England) James Wade 97.21	10

Semi-finals (best of 21 legs); 1 November
1	(England) Phil Taylor 109.36	11
(Netherlands) Jelle Klaasen 98.02	3
(England) Steve Beaton 98.50	11
3	(England) James Wade 99.03	10

Final (best of 21 legs); 1 November
1	(England) Phil Taylor 109.35	11
(England) Steve Beaton 97.16	3

Scores after player's names are three-dart averages (total points scored divided by darts thrown and multiplied by 3)

== Statistics ==
Player	Played	Legs Won	Legs Lost	100+	140+	180s	High Checkout	3-dart Average
(England) Phil Taylor	5	47	11			37		111.54
(England) Colin Lloyd	3	20	20			12		97.78
(Scotland) Gary Anderson	3	18	16			14		97.56
(England) James Wade	4	35	26			14		96.76
(Netherlands) Jelle Klaasen	4	28	26			15		96.26
(England) Mervyn King	3	21	21			5		95.90
(England) Colin Osborne	2	12	11			5	81	95.47
(England) Andy Hamilton	2	11	12			6	112	94.98
(Netherlands) Raymond van Barneveld	2	13	14			8	122	94.65
(England) Steve Beaton	5	39	36			21		94.39
(England) Andy Smith	1	2	6			4	96	93.65
(Netherlands) Vincent van der Voort	1	2	6			0	80	93.58
(Austria) Mensur Suljović	2	11	12			1	135	93.07
(England) Jamie Caven	2	14	13			9	124	92.65
(Canada) John Part	1	5	6			2	55	92.27
(Scotland) Robert Thornton	2	6	13			4	95	92.17
(England) Mark Walsh	3	21	21			9		91.88
(Netherlands) Toon Greebe	1	2	6			1	70	91.02
(England) Terry Jenkins	1	4	6			3	60	90.30
(England) Adrian Lewis	1	2	6			1	48	89.68
(England) Alan Tabern	1	4	6			0	61	89.60
(England) Ronnie Baxter	2	7	11			1	110	89.58
(Australia) Paul Nicholson	1	2	6			0	124	89.18
(Netherlands) Co Stompé	1	5	6			2	100	88.07
(Netherlands) Roland Scholten	1	3	6			1	85	87.92
(England) Dennis Priestley	1	5	6			1	70	87.51
(England) Wes Newton	1	4	6			2	58	86.54
(England) Wayne Jones	1	2	6			2	68	86.40
(England) Kevin Painter	1	4	6			2	50	85.35
(Spain) Carlos Rodríguez	1	5	6			3	66	84.97
(Netherlands) Michael van Gerwen	2	13	11			5	170	84.51
(Netherlands) Remco van Eijden	1	3	6			0	65	83.35
