= 2008 Las Vegas Desert Classic =

2008 partypoker.com Las Vegas Desert Classic

Tournament information
- Dates: 2–6 July 2008
- Venue: Mandalay Bay Resort
- Location: Paradise
- Country: United States
- Organisation(s): PDC
- Format: Legs; Final – best of 25
- Prize fund: £126,400
- Winner's share: £20,000
- High checkout: 170 (England) James Wade

Champion(s)
- (England) Phil Taylor

The 2008 partypoker.com Las Vegas Desert Classic was the seventh installment of the Las Vegas Desert Classic, a darts tournament organised by the Professional Darts Corporation. It was held in the evenings (GMT, morning local time/PST) between 2–6 July 2008 at Mandalay Bay, Paradise, United States.

Phil Taylor emerged as the champion, in all but one match posting above a 100 average, beating James Wade in the final. This was his fourth Desert Classic title, having bounced back from a first round defeat to Mark Dudbridge in the 2007 Las Vegas Desert Classic.

Last year's champion Raymond van Barneveld was looking to retain his title, but he was knocked out in the second round by Alan Tabern.

== Prize money ==
A total prize fund of £126,400 was available for the tournament, unchanged from the previous year.

Stage (no. of players)		Prize money (Total: £126,400)
Winner	(1)	£20,000
Runner-up	(1)	£10,000
Semi-finalists	(2)	£7,000
Quarter-finalists	(4)	£5,000
Second round losers	(8)	£3,000
First round losers	(16)	£2,000
Qualifying round losers	(32)	£200

== Qualified Players ==
PDC Top 12
1. (England) Phil Taylor
2. (Netherlands) Raymond van Barneveld
3. (England) James Wade
4. (Canada) John Part
5. (England) Terry Jenkins
6. (England) Andy Hamilton
7. (England) Adrian Lewis
8. (England) Colin Lloyd
9. (Netherlands) Roland Scholten
10. (England) Wayne Mardle
11. (England) Peter Manley
12. (England) Dennis Priestley

BEN-Pro Qualifiers
1. (United States) Darin Young
2. (United States) Bill Davis
3. (United States) Larry Butler

Canadian Number One
1. (Canada) Gerry Convery

Monday Qualifiers
- (England) Adrian Gray
- (England) Mervyn King
- (Netherlands) Co Stompé
- (Canada) Shawn Brenneman
- (England) Mark Walsh
- (Scotland) Robert Thornton
- (England) Martin Burchell
- (England) Steve Maish

Tuesday Qualifiers
- (Netherlands) Jelle Klaasen
- (Wales) Barrie Bates
- (Republic of Ireland) Mick McGowan
- (England) Dennis Smith
- (England) Kevin Painter
- (England) Matt Clark
- (England) Sam Rooney
- (England) Alan Tabern

== Draw ==
Round 1 (best of 11 legs); 2-3 July
1	(England) Phil Taylor 108.84	6
(England) Kevin Painter 103.68	4
(England) Dennis Priestley 88.54	6
(Netherlands) Co Stompé 86.07	2
8	(England) Colin Lloyd 82.94	5
(England) Sam Rooney 84.38	6
(England) Wayne Mardle 87.98	4
(England) Adrian Gray 84.39	6
4	(Canada) John Part 87.38	4
(England) Mervyn King 89.29	6
(United States) Darin Young 83.22	6
(England) Martin Burchell 80.34	4
5	(England) Terry Jenkins 81.38	6
(Republic of Ireland) Mick McGowan 82.06	4
(Netherlands) Roland Scholten 87.70	6
(Wales) Barrie Bates 83.96	4
2	(Netherlands) Raymond van Barneveld 91.09	6
(England) Matt Clark 87.13	0
(United States) Larry Butler 86.12	4
(England) Alan Tabern 90.62	6
7	(England) Adrian Lewis 91.73	6
(Scotland) Robert Thornton 89.00	5
(England) Peter Manley 95.71	6
(England) Steve Maish 92.32	3
3	(England) James Wade 92.63	6
(England) Dennis Smith 89.07	1
(United States) Bill Davis 80.83	5
(England) Mark Walsh 87.75	6
6	(England) Andy Hamilton 100.50	6
(Canada) Shawn Brenneman 73.44	1
(Canada) Gerry Convery 86.91	1
(Netherlands) Jelle Klaasen 95.24	6

Round 2 (best of 15 legs); 4 July
1	(England) Phil Taylor 103.67	8
(England) Dennis Priestley 93.19	4
(England) Sam Rooney 88.95	3
(England) Adrian Gray 85.34	8
(England) Mervyn King 97.18	8
(United States) Darin Young 91.45	6
5	(England) Terry Jenkins 94.11	6
(Netherlands) Roland Scholten 94.73	8
2	(Netherlands) Raymond van Barneveld 93.78	4
(England) Alan Tabern 90.85	8
7	(England) Adrian Lewis 96.74	6
(England) Peter Manley 98.67	8
3	(England) James Wade 88.30	8
(England) Mark Walsh 88.19	5
6	(England) Andy Hamilton 87.53	8
(Netherlands) Jelle Klaasen 86.53	7

Quarter-finals (best of 21 legs); 5 July
1	(England) Phil Taylor 99.00	11
(England) Adrian Gray 88.53	4
(England) Mervyn King 85.36	2
(Netherlands) Roland Scholten 88.81	11
(England) Alan Tabern 86.91	8
(England) Peter Manley 87.52	11
3	(England) James Wade 92.88	11
6	(England) Andy Hamilton 92.10	7

Semi-finals (best of 21 legs); 6 July
1	(England) Phil Taylor 103.26	11
(Netherlands) Roland Scholten 92.83	2
(England) Peter Manley 95.36	8
3	(England) James Wade 98.73	11

Final (best of 25 legs); 6 July
1	(England) Phil Taylor 105.53	13
3	(England) James Wade 92.26	7
