= Scott Burnett =

American darts player

Personal information
- Nickname: "Scotty B"
- Born: 4 February 1974 (age 52) Sacramento, California, U.S.
- Home town: Sacramento, California, U.S.

Sport
- Sport: Darts
- Playing since: 1989
- Darts: 21g Shot
- Laterality: Right-handed
- Walk-on music: "Sharp Dressed Man" by ZZ Top

Organisation (see split in darts)
- PDC: 2004–2014
- WDF: 2004

PDC premier events – best performances
- World Championship: Last 64: 2010
- Desert Classic: Last 32: 2009
- US Open/WSoD: Last 64: 2009, 2010

Other tournament wins
- Tournament: Years
- ADO Tahoe Biltmore Open ADO Yuba-Sutter Open North American Darts Championship: 2010, 2013; 2011, 2014; 2009

Scotty Burnett (born February 4, 1974) is an American former professional darts player. His nickname is Scotty B.

== Career ==
Burnett won the North American Darts Championship in 2009, defeating Darin Young in the final. He qualified for the 2009 Las Vegas Desert Classic, where he was beaten 6–2 by John Part.

Burnett finished 2nd in the North American Order of Merit, and as a result qualified for the 2010 PDC World Darts Championship. He was defeated 3–0 by 2008 runner-up Kirk Shepherd in the first round.

Burnetts son Tyler Burnett won the CDC Youth Championship and has played on Team USA in the World Cup in Barbados.

== World Championship results ==
=== PDC ===
- 2010: 1st Round (lost to Kirk Shepherd 0–3) (sets)
