= Alan Tabern =

English darts player (born 1966)

Personal information
- Nickname: "The Saint"
- Born: 29 September 1966 (age 60) St. Helens, Merseyside, England

Sport
- Sport: Darts
- Playing since: 1985
- Darts: 20g A180
- Laterality: Left-handed
- Walk-on music: "The Saints Are Coming" by Skids

Organisation (see split in darts)
- BDO: 2004
- PDC: 2005–2024 (Tour Card: 2011–2013, 2015–2016, 2018–2021)

WDF major events – best performances
- Int. Darts League: Preliminary round: 2007

PDC premier events – best performances
- World Championship: Quarter-final: 2007
- World Matchplay: Quarter-final: 2008
- World Grand Prix: Last 16: 2007. 2011
- UK Open: Semi-final: 2006
- Grand Slam: Group Stage: 2008
- European Championship: Quarter-final: 2008
- Championship League: Winners group, semi-finals: 2008
- Desert Classic: Quarter-final: 2008
- US Open/WSoD: Semi-final: 2009
- PC Finals: Last 16: 2009

Other tournament wins
- Years
Midlands Open	2008
PDC Challenge Tour (×4)	2014 (×3), 2017
Southport Open	2009
Players Championships
2008 (×3)
UK Open Regionals/Qualifiers
UK Open Regional (North West England)	2006

Alan Tabern (born 29 September 1966) is an English former professional darts player who competed in Professional Darts Corporation (PDC) events. He is nicknamed "the Saint".

== Darts career ==
=== 2005–2007: Early career ===
Tabern joined the Professional Darts Corporation in 2005, making his televised debut at the UK Open. A left-handed player, he made his World Championship debut the following year, defeating Alex Roy in the first round before losing to Mark Dudbridge.

In March 2006, Tabern won the North West Regional Final of the UK Open qualifiers, defeating Steve Maish in the final. He subsequently reached the semi-finals of the 2006 UK Open, beating Denis Ovens and Andy Callaby in the last 16 and quarter-finals respectively, before losing 11–9 to Barrie Bates. This remained his best result at the tournament.

Tabern achieved his best World Championship result at the 2007 tournament, defeating Alan Warriner-Little, Denis Ovens and Dave Askew to reach the quarter-finals. He was subsequently beaten 5–0 by eventual champion Raymond van Barneveld. At the 2008 World Championship, held in December 2007, he defeated Per Laursen and Andy Jenkins before losing a closely contested third-round match 4–3 to Phil Taylor.

=== 2008: Career peak ===
The 2008 season was the most successful of Tabern's career on the PDC Pro Tour. He won three Players Championship titles, claiming his first in Wigan in March, followed by victories in Atlanta in August and Newport in September. These results helped him break into the top ten of the PDC Order of Merit for the first time, ending the year ranked ninth in the world.

Tabern also enjoyed several notable performances in televised tournaments. At the 2008 Las Vegas Desert Classic, he defeated defending champion Raymond van Barneveld 8–4 in the second round before losing to Peter Manley in the quarter-finals. At the 2008 World Matchplay, he defeated reigning world champion John Part to reach another quarter-final, where he was narrowly beaten by Dennis Priestley. He also reached the last eight of the 2008 UK Open and the inaugural European Championship.

At the 2008 Grand Slam of Darts, Tabern won two of his three group matches but finished level with Andy Hamilton on both points and leg difference. The two players contested the first televised nine-dart shootout to determine who would advance to the knockout stage. Hamilton won 265–169, eliminating Tabern from the tournament.

=== 2009–2017: Decline and Challenge Tour success ===
Tabern remained a regular participant in major PDC tournaments during the following seasons, although he was unable to reproduce his success from 2008. He reached the second round of the World Championship in four consecutive editions between 2009 and 2012, losing to Co Stompé, Mark Dudbridge, Mark Walsh and Paul Nicholson respectively. His results gradually declined, and he lost his PDC Tour Card at the end of the 2013 season.

In 2014, Tabern competed on the PDC Challenge Tour, where he enjoyed a successful season. He won three events, Challenge Tour 3, 8 and 9, and finished second in the final Order of Merit behind Mark Frost. His performance earned him a two-year Tour Card for the 2015 and 2016 seasons.

After failing to retain his Tour Card, Tabern returned to the Challenge Tour in 2017. He reached the final of Challenge Tour 7, losing to Mark Dudbridge, before winning Challenge Tour 20 in Wigan with a 5–3 victory over Adam Smith-Neale. He finished sixth in the season's Order of Merit, having earned £5,200 in prize money.

=== 2018–2021: Return to the Pro Tour ===
In January 2018, at the age of 51, Tabern regained his PDC Tour Card at Q-School in Wigan. He won eight matches on the second day of competition, securing a place on the professional circuit for the 2018 and 2019 seasons after a one-year absence.

During the 2018 season, Tabern reached the third round of two PDC European Tour events, the German Darts Grand Prix and the German Darts Open. He also qualified for the 2019 PDC World Darts Championship, marking his first appearance at the event since 2012. In the first round, played in December 2018, he defeated Australian Raymond Smith 3–2 before losing 3–1 to world number one Michael van Gerwen.

Following a difficult 2019 season, Tabern lost his Tour Card again. However, he immediately regained it through the UK Q-School Order of Merit in January 2020, securing another two years on the PDC Pro Tour.

Tabern reached the fifth round of the 2020 UK Open, but struggled to achieve consistent results during his final two-year spell as a Tour Card holder. In November 2021, he qualified for the 2021 Players Championship Finals, where he lost 6–4 to Jonny Clayton in the first round. He subsequently lost his Tour Card at the end of the season.

=== 2022–2024: Later career ===
Tabern returned to the Challenge Tour in 2022 and continued competing in 2023, but did not regain his PDC Tour Card. He also competed on the World Seniors Darts Tour, reaching the final of the fifth Open Series event in Manchester in October 2022. After defeating Andy Hamilton 6–4 in the semi-finals, he narrowly lost 6–5 to Darren Johnson in the final.

Tabern continued his attempts to return to the professional circuit, including appearances at PDC Q-School in 2023 and 2024, but did not secure another Tour Card.

== World Championship results ==
=== PDC ===
- 2006: 2nd round (lost to Mark Dudbridge 0–4)
- 2007: Quarter-final (lost to Raymond van Barneveld 0–5)
- 2008: 3rd round (lost to Phil Taylor 3–4)
- 2009: 2nd round (lost to Co Stompé 1–4)
- 2010: 2nd round (lost to Mark Dudbridge 3–4)
- 2011: 2nd round (lost to Mark Walsh 3–4)
- 2012: 2nd round (lost to Paul Nicholson 0–4)
- 2019: 2nd round (lost to Michael van Gerwen 1–3)

== Performance timeline ==
=== PDC ===
Tournament	2005	2006	2007	2008	2009	2010	2011		2012	2013	2014	2015	2016	2017	2018	2019	2020	2021
PDC ranked televised events
PDC World Championship	DNQ	2R	QF	3R	2R	2R	2R		2R	Did not qualify						2R	DNQ	
UK Open	2R	SF	4R	QF	QF	5R	3R		3R	DNQ	Prel.	2R	1R	5R	DNQ	3R	5R	2R
World Matchplay	DNQ	1R	1R	QF	2R	2R	1R		Did not qualify									
World Grand Prix	DNQ		2R	1R	1R	1R	2R		Did not qualify									
European Championship	Not held			QF	1R	1R	1R		Did not qualify									
Grand Slam of Darts	Not held		DNQ	RR	Did not qualify													
Players Championship Finals	Not held			2R	1R	1R	1R	1R	DNQ						1R	DNQ		1R
PDC non-ranked televised events
Championship League Darts	Not held			SF	RR	RR	RR		DNQ		Not held							
Past major events
Las Vegas Desert Classic	DNQ		2R	QF	1R	Not held												
Career statistics
Year-end ranking	–	25	17	9	13	23	24		36	53	187	138	99	105	65	70	120	92

==== PDC European Tour ====
Season	1	2	3	4	5	6	7	8	9	10	11	12	13
2012	ADO; 2R	GDC; 2R	EDO; 1R	GDM; 1R	DDM; 2R								
2013	UKM; 1R	DNQ		ADO; 1R	DNQ	GDC; 1R	GDM; 1R	DNQ					
2016	Did not qualify								EDG; 2R	DNQ			
2017	Did not qualify				GDT; 2R	Did not qualify							
2018	DNQ	GDG; 3R	GDO; 3R	ADO; 1R	EDG; 2R	Did not qualify							
2020	DNQ	GDC; 1R	DNQ										

==== PDC Players Championships ====
Season	1	2	3	4	5	6	7	8	9	10	11	12	13	14	15	16	17	18	19	20	21	22	23	24	25	26	27	28	29	30	31	32	33	34	35	36	37
2006	DNP	DNP	HAY; 2R	BLA; 2R	NEW; 1R	DUB; 3R	IRV; 1R	LIS; 2R	LIS; 1R																												
2007	GIB; 4R	GIB; 3R	BAD; 3R	TEM; 3R	SCH; 4R	HEE; 2R	HAY; 1R	HAY; 2R	LVE; 3R	BLA; SF	DNP	CAS; QF	DNP	NEW; SF	DUB; 3R	IRV; 3R	KIR; SF	KIL; 4R	LIS; SF	LIS; 4R																	
2008	GIB; SF	GIB; 3R	BRE; 4R	WIG; W	BAD; SF	BAD; 4R	TEL; SF	TEM; 4R	GLA; 3R	SCH; 2R	BRI; F	BRI; 4R	LVE; 4R	BLA; 4R	DNP	DNP	ATL; W	VEL; 3R	VEL; 4R	DRO; 4R	CHI; 3R	NEW; 4R	NEW; W	DUB; 3R	DUB; 4R	IRV; 4R	IRV; 1R	DIN; QF	DNP	LEI; 3R	LEI; 2R						
2009	DON; 2R	GIB; F	GIB; QF	GLA; QF	GLA; SF	IRV; 3R	WIG; QF	BRE; QF	COV; 2R	NUL; 2R	NUL; 4R	TAU; QF	DER; 3R	NEW; 3R	BAR; 4R	BAR; 4R	DIN; 4R	DIN; 4R	LVE; QF	DNP	ONT; 4R	ATL; 3R	ATL; SF	SAL; SF	SAL; 3R	DUB; 3R	DUB; SF	KIL; 4R	NUL; QF	NUL; 2R	IRV; 3R	IRV; 2R					
2010	GIB; 3R	GIB; 2R	SWI; 4R	DER; 2R	GLA; 2R	GLA; 4R	WIG; 1R	CRA; 3R	BAR; 2R	DER; 1R	WIG; 3R	WIG; 3R	SAL; 1R	SAL; 3R	BAR; 3R	BAR; QF	HAA; 4R	HAA; F	LVE; 4R	LVE; 4R	LVE; 3R	DNP	ONT; 4R	ONT; QF	CRA; 3R	CRA; SF	NUL; QF	NUL; 4R	DUB; QF	DUB; 3R	KIL; 3R	BAD; 4R	BAD; 2R	BAR; 3R	BAR; 3R	DER; 3R	DER; 1R
2011	HAL; 4R	HAL; QF	DER; 3R	DER; 4R	CRA; 2R	CRA; 4R	VIE; 4R	VIE; 3R	CRA; SF	CRA; 2R	BAR; 4R	BAR; 3R	NUL; 3R	NUL; 3R	ONT; 4R	ONT; 3R	DER; 3R	DER; 2R	NUL; 2R	NUL; 3R	DUB; 4R	DUB; 2R	DNP	GLA; 3R	GLA; 4R	ALI; 4R	ALI; 2R	CRA; 1R	CRA; 2R	WIG; 4R	WIG; 3R						
2012	ALI; 3R	ALI; 1R	REA; 2R	REA; 1R	CRA; 1R	CRA; 1R	BIR; 1R	BIR; 2R	CRA; 1R	CRA; 1R	BAR; 2R	BAR; 2R	DUB; 2R	DUB; 1R	KIL; 1R	KIL; 1R	CRA; 1R	CRA; 2R	BAR; 1R	BAR; 2R																	
2013	WIG; 1R	WIG; 1R	WIG; 2R	WIG; 2R	CRA; 1R	CRA; 2R	BAR; 3R	BAR; 2R	DUB; 1R	DUB; 1R	KIL; QF	KIL; 3R	WIG; 3R	WIG; 4R	BAR; 2R	BAR; 1R																					
2015	BAR; 1R	BAR; 1R	BAR; 1R	BAR; 1R	BAR; 1R	COV; 1R	COV; 1R	COV; 1R	CRA; 2R	CRA; 2R	BAR; 1R	BAR; 2R	WIG; 2R	WIG; 2R	BAR; 1R	BAR; 1R	DUB; 1R	DUB; 1R	COV; 1R	COV; 2R																	
2016	BAR; 1R	BAR; 1R	BAR; 1R	BAR; 1R	BAR; 1R	BAR; 2R	BAR; 1R	COV; 3R	COV; 1R	BAR; 1R	BAR; 3R	BAR; 1R	BAR; 1R	BAR; 1R	BAR; 2R	BAR; 1R	DUB; 1R	DUB; 3R	BAR; 1R	BAR; 1R																	
2017 (Note: Not a Tour card holder)	Did not participate								WIG; 2R	WIG; 1R	MIL; 1R	MIL; 1R	Did not participate				BAR; 1R	BAR; 1R	DNP	DNP	BAR; 1R	BAR; 1R															
2018	BAR; 2R	BAR; 1R	BAR; 1R	BAR; 4R	MIL; 4R	MIL; 2R	BAR; 2R	BAR; 3R	WIG; 2R	WIG; 2R	MIL; 2R	MIL; 2R	WIG; 1R	WIG; 1R	BAR; 1R	BAR; 3R	BAR; 3R	BAR; 1R	DUB; 1R	DUB; 1R	BAR; 1R	BAR; 2R															
2019	WIG; 2R	WIG; 4R	WIG; 2R	WIG; 3R	BAR; 1R	BAR; 2R	WIG; 1R	WIG; 4R	BAR; 2R	BAR; 2R	BAR; 1R	BAR; 1R	BAR; 2R	BAR; 3R	BAR; 2R	BAR; 4R	WIG; 1R	WIG; 2R	BAR; 1R	BAR; 2R	HIL; 2R	HIL; 1R	BAR; 1R	BAR; 1R	BAR; 1R	BAR; 2R	DUB; 1R	DUB; 1R	BAR; 1R	BAR; 1R							
2020	BAR; 2R	BAR; 1R	WIG; 1R	WIG; 3R	WIG; 1R	WIG; 3R	BAR; 1R	BAR; 1R	MIL; 2R	MIL; 2R	MIL; 1R	MIL; 1R	MIL; 3R	NIE; 1R	NIE; 1R	NIE; 2R	NIE; 1R	NIE; 1R	COV; 2R	COV; 1R	COV; 1R	COV; 2R	COV; 1R														
2021	BOL; 1R	BOL; 2R	BOL; 2R	BOL; 2R	MIL; 1R	MIL; 1R	MIL; 1R	MIL; 1R	NIE; QF	NIE; 2R	NIE; 1R	NIE; 3R	MIL; 2R	MIL; 2R	MIL; 2R	MIL; 2R	COV; 2R	COV; 2R	COV; 1R	COV; 1R	BAR; 1R	BAR; 1R	BAR; 1R	BAR; 1R	BAR; 2R	BAR; 2R	BAR; 2R	BAR; 3R	BAR; 3R	BAR; 1R							

==== PDC Challenge Tour ====
Season	1	2	3	4	5	6	7	8	9	10	11	12	13	14	15	16	17	18	19	20	21	22	23	24	Prize money	Ranking
2014	WIG; SF	WIG; F	REA; W	REA; L128	WIG; L16	WIG; L128	COV; L128	COV; W	WIG; W	WIG; QF	COV; L64	COV; L128	COV; L64	COV; L16	WIG; L64	WIG; L128									£8,350	2nd
2017	MIL; SF	MIL; SF	MIL; L64	MIL; L32	BAR; L64	BAR; L32	BAR; F	BAR; L16	Did not participate				MIL; L32	MIL; L32	MIL; QF	MIL; L64	WIG; L128	WIG; L32	WIG; L64	WIG; W					£5,200	6th
2022	MIL; L128	MIL; L128	MIL; L128	MIL; L256	MIL; L64	Did not participate										LEI; L128	LEI; L16	LEI; QF	LEI; QF	LEI; L128	LEI; L64	LEI; L32	LEI; L128	LEI; L16	£1,000	63rd
2023	MIL; L32	MIL; L64	MIL; L256	MIL; L512	MIL; L32	Did not participate				MIL; L16	MIL; L32	MIL; L16	MIL; L128	MIL; L64	MIL; L128	MIL; L16	MIL; L256	MIL; L128	MIL; L32	WIG; L32	WIG; L32	WIG; L128	WIG; L256	WIG; L16	£2,450	36th

Performance Table Legend
W	Won the tournament	F	Finalist	SF	Semifinalist	QF	Quarterfinalist	#R; RR; L#	Lost in # round Round-robin; Last # stage	DQ	Disqualified
DNQ	Did not qualify	DNP	Did not participate	WD	Withdrew	NH	Tournament not held	#R; RR; L#	Lost in # round Round-robin; Last # stage	NYF	Not yet founded
