= Phillip Hazel =

New Zealand darts player

Personal information
- Nickname: The Sniper
- Born: 3 January 1956 (age 70) Napier, New Zealand
- Home town: Napier, New Zealand

Sport
- Sport: Darts
- Playing since: 2002
- Darts: 19g Shot
- Laterality: Right-handed
- Walk-on music: "Tubthumping" by Chumbawamba

Organisation (see split in darts)
- PDC: 2008–2013

PDC premier events – best performances
- World Championship: Last 72: 2010
- Desert Classic: Last 32: 2009

Other tournament wins
- Tournament: Years
- DPA Australian Matchplay DPA WA Open Gaels Club Open Mittagong RSL Open PDC World New Zealand Qualifying Event Robina Gold Coast Open: 2010; 2011; 2011; 2010; 2009 2011

Phillip Hazel (born 3 January 1956 in Napier, New Zealand) is a New Zealand former professional darts player.

== Career ==
Hazel reached the final of the Viva Las Vegas NZ tournament, losing to Simon Whitlock. Despite the loss, Hazel was invited to attempt to qualify for the Las Vegas Desert Classic. After losing his first match in the first qualifier, Hazel defeated the likes of Jason Clark, Mark Stephenson and Barrie Bates to qualify. He lost in the first round to James Wade the world number two, but produced a brave battle. He then won the New Zealand National Championships in earned qualification for the 2010 PDC World Darts Championship.

== World Championship results ==
=== PDC ===
- 2010: Last 72 (lost to Osmann Kijamet 2–4) (legs)
