= 2010 PDC World Darts Championship =

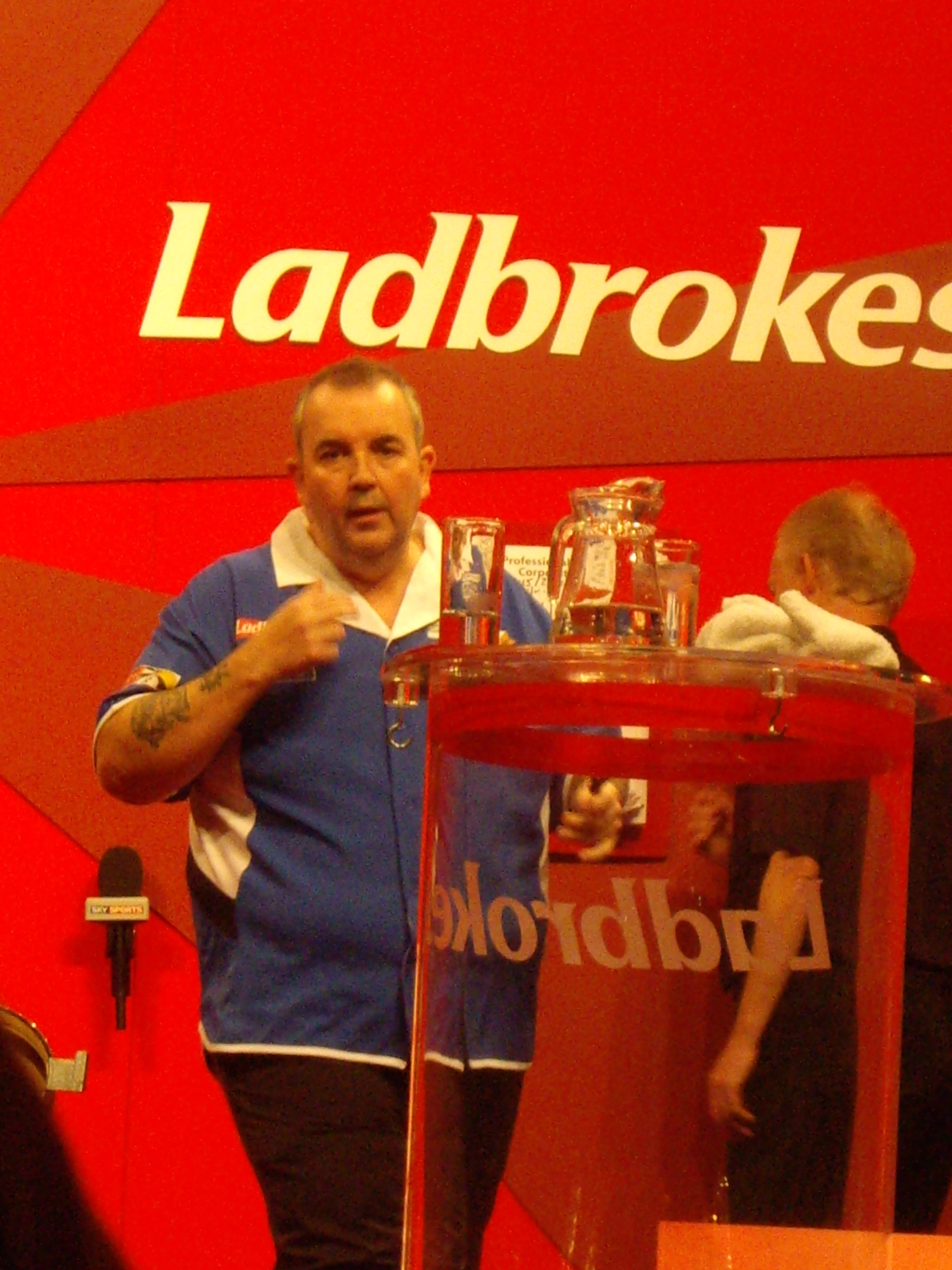

Tournament information
- Dates: 18 December 2009 – 3 January 2010
- Venue: Alexandra Palace
- Location: London, England
- Organisation(s): Professional Darts Corporation (PDC)
- Format: Legs (preliminaries, 3rd/4th place playoff); Sets (from Round 1); Final – first to 7
- Prize fund: £1,000,000
- Winner's share: £200,000
- Nine-dart finish: Raymond van Barneveld
- High checkout: 170; Phil Taylor (x2); Simon Whitlock (x2)

Champion(s)
- Phil Taylor (ENG)

The 2010 PDC World Darts Championship (known for sponsorship reasons as the 2010 Ladbrokes.com World Darts Championship) was the seventeenth World Championship organised by the Professional Darts Corporation since it separated from the British Darts Organisation. The event took place at Alexandra Palace in London from 18 December 2009 to 3 January 2010.

Phil Taylor successfully defended the title with a 7–3 victory over Simon Whitlock in the final. This was Taylor's thirteenth PDC world title, and his fifteenth in all. Raymond van Barneveld recorded the second nine-dart finish in the history of the tournament in his second-round match against Brendan Dolan.

== Format and qualifiers ==
The televised stages featured 72 players, an increase of 2 from last year. The top 32 players in the PDC Order of Merit on 1 December 2009 were seeded for the tournament. They were joined by the 16 highest non qualified players in the Players Championship Order of Merit from events played on the PDC Pro Tour.

These 48 players were joined by 24 international players: the 4 highest names in the European Order of Merit not already qualified, the 3 highest names in the North American Order of Merit not already qualified and 15 further international qualifiers to be determined by the PDC and PDPA. Some of the players, such as the 4 from the European Order of Merit, the top 2 Americans, and Australian players are entered straight into the first round, while others, having won qualifying events in their countries, were entered into the preliminary round.

Order of Merit

1. (England) Phil Taylor
2. (Netherlands) Raymond van Barneveld
3. (England) James Wade
4. (Canada) John Part
5. (England) Mervyn King
6. (England) Terry Jenkins
7. (England) Ronnie Baxter
8. (England) Adrian Lewis
9. (England) Dennis Priestley
10. (England) Colin Lloyd
11. (England) Colin Osborne
12. (England) Alan Tabern
13. (England) Mark Walsh
14. (England) Andy Hamilton
15. (England) Kevin Painter
16. (Scotland) Robert Thornton
17. (England) Wayne Mardle
18. (Netherlands) Vincent van der Voort
19. (England) Steve Beaton
20. (England) Peter Manley
21. (England) Mark Dudbridge
22. (England) Wayne Jones
23. (England) Denis Ovens
24. (Netherlands) Jelle Klaasen
25. (England) Wes Newton
26. (England) Jamie Caven
27. (England) Andy Smith
28. (Netherlands) Co Stompé
29. (England) Kirk Shepherd
30. (Netherlands) Michael van Gerwen
31. (England) Tony Eccles
32. (Netherlands) Roland Scholten

Pro Tour

1. (Scotland) Gary Anderson
2. (Australia) Paul Nicholson
3. (England) Andy Jenkins
4. (Scotland) Peter Wright
5. (Northern Ireland) Brendan Dolan
6. (England) Steve Hine
7. (England) Kevin McDine
8. (England) Steve Brown
9. (England) Matt Clark
10. (England) Colin Monk
11. (England) Steve Maish
12. (Wales) Barrie Bates
13. (Wales) Mark Webster
14. (Netherlands) Toon Greebe
15. (England) Alex Roy
16. (Spain) Carlos Rodriguez

European Order of Merit
First round qualifiers

- (Germany) Andree Welge
- (Austria) Mensur Suljović
- (Gibraltar) Dylan Duo
- (Germany) Jyhan Artut

International qualifiers
First round qualifiers

- (United States) Darin Young
- (United States) Scott Burnett
- (Australia) Simon Whitlock
- (New Zealand) Warren Parry

International qualifiers
Preliminary round qualifiers

- (Canada) Ken MacNeil
- (Sweden) Magnus Caris
- (South Africa) Les Francis
- (New Zealand) Phillip Hazel
- (Poland) Krzysztof Kciuk
- (Slovenia) Osmann Kijamet
- (Finland) Jarkko Komula
- (Russia) Roman Konchikov
- (Denmark) Per Laursen
- (Guyana) Norman Madhoo
- (Japan) Haruki Muramatsu
- (Republic of Ireland) Aodhagan O'Neill
- (Philippines) Ian Perez
- (Netherlands) Jan van der Rassel
- (Spain) Francisco Ruiz
- (Germany) Tomas Seyler

== Prize money ==
The 2010 World Championship featured a prize fund of £1,000,000 – a rise of £260,000 on the previous year, to become darts' first £1 million tournament. All rounds featured more money compared to 2009, and also sees a £10,000 highest checkout prize being to make the fund go up to a million.

In addition, the losing semi-finalists contested a third place play off match on the same night as the Final, played for an extra £20,000 "winner takes all" pot on top of the £40,000 they both already received for being losing semi finalists. This was the first time since 1998 that such a playoff occurred.

The prize money is allocated as follows:

| Position (num. of players) | | Prize money (Total: £1,000,000) |
|---|---|---|
| Winner | (1) | £200,000 |
| Runner-Up | (1) | £100,000 |
| Third place | (1) | £60,000 |
| Fourth place | (1) | £40,000 |
| Quarter-finalists | (4) | £25,000 |
| Third round losers | (8) | £15,000 |
| Second round losers | (16) | £10,000 |
| First round losers | (32) | £6,000 |
| Preliminary round losers | (8) | £3,500 |
| Nine-dart finish | (1) | £25,000 |

== Draw ==
=== Preliminary round ===
The preliminary round draw was made on 29 November, and the format is best of 7 legs.

| Player 1 | Score | Player 2 |
|---|---|---|
| (Denmark) Per Laursen 81.45 | 3–4 | (Philippines) Ian Perez 94.53 |
| (Canada) Ken MacNeil 77.52 | 4–2 | (Guyana) Norman Madhoo 76.25 |
| (Finland) Jarkko Komula 76.09 | 4–3 | (Russia) Roman Konchikov 73.21 |
| (Japan) Haruki Muramatsu 75.98 | 4–1 | (Poland) Krzysztof Kciuk 76.28 |
| (Germany) Tomas Seyler 79.66 | 1–4 | (Netherlands) Jan van der Rassel 83.07 |
| (Sweden) Magnus Caris 87.13 | 4–0 | (Spain) Francisco Ruiz 75.09 |
| (Republic of Ireland) Aodhagan O'Neill 88.06 | 4–2 | (South Africa) Les Francis 79.16 |
| (New Zealand) Phillip Hazel 83.15 | 2–4 | (Slovenia) Osmann Kijamet 85.34 |

(China) Shi Yongsheng was originally drawn to play Tomas Seyler. However, he was forced to withdraw from the competition after he was unable to receive a visa to travel to the UK. Jan van der Rassel, the next non-qualified player from the Players Championship Order of Merit, took his place.

=== Last 64 ===
The first round draw was made live on Sky Sports News on 7 December, and was conducted by Rod Harrington and Eric Bristow.

All sets were best of five legs, unless there is a final set tie-break. All games that went to a final set had to be won by 2 clear legs; if after six more legs the score in the final set reached 5-5, a sudden death leg would take place to decide the winner.

==== Finals ====
Quarter-finals (best of 9 sets); 1 January
1 | (England) Phil Taylor 107.37 | 5
8 | (England) Adrian Lewis 102.95 | 0
28 | (Netherlands) Co Stompé 94.86 | 3
(Wales) Mark Webster 98.54 | 5
2 | (Netherlands) Raymond van Barneveld 95.16 | 5
7 | (England) Ronnie Baxter 90.46 | 0
(Australia) Simon Whitlock 105.37 | 5
3 | (England) James Wade 97.29 | 3

Semi-finals (best of 11 sets); 2 January
1 | (England) Phil Taylor 106.00 | 6
(Wales) Mark Webster 88.02 | 0
2 | (Netherlands) Raymond van Barneveld 98.40 | 5
(Australia) Simon Whitlock 96.04 | 6

Final (best of 13 sets); 3 January
1 | (England) Phil Taylor 104.38 | 7
(Australia) Simon Whitlock 100.51 | 3
3rd place playoff (best of 19 legs)
(Wales) Mark Webster 93.90 | 10
2 | (Netherlands) Raymond van Barneveld 89.93 | 8

==== Rounds 1-4 ====
First round (best of 5 sets); 18–23 December
1 | (England) Phil Taylor 102.48 | 3
(England) Colin Monk 77.66 | 0
32 | (Netherlands) Roland Scholten 84.90 | 2
(England) Steve Hine 83.45 | 3
16 | (Scotland) Robert Thornton 84.29 | 3
(Philippines) Ian Perez 82.75 | 1
17 | (England) Wayne Mardle 72.39 | 0
(Germany) Jyhan Artut 82.24 | 3
8 | (England) Adrian Lewis 106.51 | 3
(Republic of Ireland) Aodhagan O'Neill 75.76 | 0
25 | (England) Wes Newton 86.61 | 3
(Finland) Jarkko Komula 82.73 | 0
9 | (England) Dennis Priestley 93.90 | 2
(England) Kevin McDine 99.06 | 3
24 | (Netherlands) Jelle Klaasen 88.83 | 1
(Wales) Barrie Bates 88.61 | 3
5 | (England) Mervyn King 97.40 | 3
(England) Matt Clark 85.62 | 0
28 | (Netherlands) Co Stompé 87.37 | 3
(England) Steve Maish 82.78 | 1
12 | (England) Alan Tabern 89.41 | 3
(Canada) Ken MacNeil 88.82 | 2
21 | (England) Mark Dudbridge 82.67 | 3
(Germany) Andree Welge 83.10 | 0
4 | (Canada) John Part 95.45 | 3
(Netherlands) Toon Greebe 84.06 | 0
29 | (England) Kirk Shepherd 79.21 | 3
(United States) Scott Burnett 69.91 | 0
13 | (England) Mark Walsh 91.43 | 2
(Wales) Mark Webster 90.75 | 3
20 | (England) Peter Manley 88.76 | 3
(England) Andy Jenkins 88.27 | 2
2 | (Netherlands) Raymond van Barneveld 92.65 | 3
(New Zealand) Warren Parry 78.89 | 0
31 | (England) Tony Eccles 94.36 | 1
(Northern Ireland) Brendan Dolan 94.96 | 3
15 | (England) Kevin Painter 91.17 | 3
(Austria) Mensur Suljović 86.83 | 1
18 | (Netherlands) Vincent van der Voort 93.26 | 3
(Gibraltar) Dylan Duo 74.04 | 0
7 | (England) Ronnie Baxter 94.93 | 3
(Japan) Haruki Muramatsu 83.84 | 0
26 | (England) Jamie Caven 93.17 | 2
(Scotland) Gary Anderson 93.11 | 3
10 | (England) Colin Lloyd 95.55 | 3
(Sweden) Magnus Caris 90.05 | 1
23 | (England) Denis Ovens 83.19 | 3
(Netherlands) Jan van der Rassel 82.12 | 1
6 | (England) Terry Jenkins 93.35 | 3
(Australia) Paul Nicholson 93.12 | 2
27 | (England) Andy Smith 85.41 | 2
(United States) Darin Young 84.56 | 3
11 | (England) Colin Osborne 96.86 | 1
(Australia) Simon Whitlock 101.02 | 3
22 | (England) Wayne Jones 85.61 | 3
(England) Alex Roy 82.54 | 1
3 | (England) James Wade 96.65 | 3
(England) Steve Brown 92.38 | 1
30 | (Netherlands) Michael van Gerwen 89.00 | 3
(Scotland) Peter Wright 83.75 | 1
14 | (England) Andy Hamilton 87.27 | 3
(Slovenia) Osmann Kijamet 78.31 | 0
19 | (England) Steve Beaton 89.52 | 3
(Spain) Carlos Rodriguez 82.07 | 0

Second round (best of 7 sets); 27–29 December
1 | (England) Taylor 103.28 | 4
(England) Hine 86.25 | 0
16 | (Scotland) Thornton 91.71 | 4
(Germany) Artut 83.22 | 1
8 | (England) Lewis 103.68 | 4
25 | (England) Newton 95.26 | 2
(England) McDine 95.73 | 4
(Wales) Bates 90.47 | 0
5 | (England) King 93.10 | 2
28 | (Netherlands) Stompé 99.86 | 4
12 | (England) Tabern 92.34 | 3
21 | (England) Dudbridge 95.06 | 4
4 | (Canada) Part 76.51 | 1
29 | (England) Shepherd 79.35 | 4
(Wales) Webster 89.52 | 4
20 | (England) Manley 84.12 | 2
2 | (Netherlands) van Barneveld 89.95 | 4
(Northern Ireland) Dolan 82.11 | 0
15 | (England) Painter 92.23 | 4
18 | (Netherlands) van der Voort 94.39 | 3
7 | (England) Baxter 97.51 | 4
(Scotland) Anderson 90.98 | 0
10 | (England) Lloyd 88.48 | 4
23 | (England) Ovens 88.74 | 3
6 | (England) T. Jenkins 90.18 | 4
(United States) Young 75.96 | 0
(Australia) Whitlock 99.24 | 4
22 | (England) Jones 92.92 | 0
3 | (England) Wade 97.79 | 4
30 | (Netherlands) van Gerwen 93.92 | 2
14 | (England) Hamilton 94.69 | 4
19 | (England) Beaton 95.72 | 1

Third round (best of 7 sets); 29–30 December
1 | (England) Taylor 104.26 | 4
16 | (Scotland) Thornton 90.42 | 1
8 | (England) Lewis 103.63 | 4
(England) McDine 92.14 | 0
28 | (Netherlands) Stompé 102.42 | 4
21 | (England) Dudbridge 97.89 | 2
29 | (England) Shepherd 88.78 | 1
(Wales) Webster 97.41 | 4
2 | (Netherlands) van Barneveld 89.41 | 4
15 | (England) Painter 88.67 | 1
7 | (England) Baxter 94.15 | 4
10 | (England) Lloyd 89.26 | 1
6 | (England) T. Jenkins 92.07 | 2
(Australia) Whitlock 100.60 | 4
3 | (England) Wade 96.15 | 4
14 | (England) Hamilton 97.66 | 3

Quarter-finals (best of 9 sets); 1 January
1 | (England) Taylor 107.37 | 5
8 | (England) Lewis 102.95 | 0
28 | (Netherlands) Stompé 94.86 | 3
(Wales) Webster 98.54 | 5
2 | (Netherlands) van Barneveld 95.16 | 5
7 | (England) Baxter 90.46 | 0
(Australia) Whitlock 105.37 | 5
3 | (England) Wade 97.29 | 3

Scores after player's names are three-dart averages (total points scored divided by darts thrown and multiplied by 3)

== Final ==
Final: Best of 13 sets. Referees: Paul Hinks (first half) and Bruce Spendley (second half). Alexandra Palace, London, England, 3 January 2010.
| (1) Phil Taylor (England) | 7 – 3 | (Australia) Simon Whitlock (98) |
3 – 1, 2 – 3, 2 – 3, 3 – 1, 3 – 0, 3 – 2, 3 – 0, 3 – 2, 1 – 3, 3 – 1
| 104.38 | Average (3 darts) | 100.51 |
| 9 | 180 scores | 11 |
| 170 | Highest checkout | 170 |
| 0% (0/0) | Checkout summary | 0% (0/0) |

== Statistics ==
| Player | Played | Sets Won | Sets Lost | Legs Won | Legs Lost | 100+ | 140+ | 180s | High checkout | 3-dart average |
|---|---|---|---|---|---|---|---|---|---|---|
| (England) Adrian Lewis | 4 | 11 | 7 | 41 | 30 | 87 | 43 | 37 | 164 | 104.19 |
| (England) Phil Taylor | 6 | 29 | 4 | 68 | 15 | 173 | 108 | 43 | 170 | 104.63 |
| (Australia) Simon Whitlock | 6 | 25 | 18 | 83 | 59 | 223 | 148 | 58 | 170 | 100.46 |
| (England) James Wade | 4 | 14 | 11 | 51 | 48 | 138 | 73 | 25 | 150 | 96.97 |
| (England) Colin Osborne | 1 | 1 | 3 | 8 | 11 | 21 | 14 | 3 | 160 | 96.86 |
| (Netherlands) Co Stompé | 4 | 14 | 10 | 53 | 46 | 113 | 70 | 22 | 132 | 96.13 |
| (England) Kevin McDine | 3 | 7 | 6 | 29 | 27 | 86 | 34 | 9 | 127 | 95.64 |
| (England) Ronnie Baxter | 4 | 11 | 6 | 37 | 33 | 103 | 61 | 7 | 142 | 94.26 |
| (England) Mervyn King | 2 | 5 | 4 | 18 | 18 | 50 | 17 | 11 | 136 | 95.25 |
| (England) Tony Eccles | 1 | 1 | 3 | 5 | 10 | 16 | 16 | 2 | 101 | 94.36 |
| (Wales) Mark Webster | 5 | 16 | 14 | 72 | 59 | 179 | 80 | 14 | 136 | 93.02 |
| (England) Dennis Priestley | 1 | 2 | 3 | 9 | 12 | 34 | 15 | 3 | 150 | 93.90 |
| (Netherlands) Vincent van der Voort | 2 | 6 | 4 | 23 | 17 | 59 | 30 | 9 | 164 | 93.83 |
| (England) Andy Hamilton | 3 | 10 | 5 | 34 | 26 | 78 | 35 | 16 | 140 | 93.21 |
| (England) Jamie Caven | 1 | 2 | 3 | 8 | 13 | 30 | 13 | 5 | 80 | 93.17 |
| (Australia) Paul Nicholson | 1 | 2 | 3 | 10 | 11 | 28 | 15 | 6 | 110 | 93.12 |
| (Netherlands) Raymond van Barneveld | 5 | 21 | 7 | 83 | 46 | 175 | 79 | 30 | 141 | 92.58 |
| (England) Steve Beaton | 2 | 4 | 4 | 19 | 14 | 37 | 25 | 7 | 98 | 92.62 |
| (England) Steve Brown | 1 | 1 | 3 | 4 | 11 | 20 | 9 | 2 | 60 | 92.38 |
| (Scotland) Gary Anderson | 2 | 3 | 6 | 21 | 20 | 53 | 32 | 8 | 121 | 92.05 |
| (England) Terry Jenkins | 3 | 9 | 6 | 34 | 28 | 86 | 45 | 12 | 101 | 91.87 |
| (England) Mark Dudbridge | 3 | 9 | 7 | 41 | 34 | 86 | 62 | 7 | 146 | 91.87 |
| (Netherlands) Michael van Gerwen | 2 | 5 | 5 | 20 | 20 | 58 | 20 | 4 | 125 | 91.46 |
| (England) Mark Walsh | 1 | 2 | 3 | 9 | 11 | 30 | 16 | 4 | 83 | 91.43 |
| (England) Colin Lloyd | 3 | 8 | 8 | 36 | 34 | 91 | 46 | 9 | 133 | 91.10 |
| (England) Wes Newton | 2 | 5 | 4 | 18 | 20 | 53 | 29 | 8 | 124 | 90.94 |
| (England) Alan Tabern | 2 | 6 | 6 | 28 | 31 | 89 | 46 | 16 | 141 | 90.88 |
| (England) Kevin Painter | 3 | 8 | 8 | 36 | 32 | 92 | 49 | 22 | 164 | 90.69 |
| (Wales) Barrie Bates | 2 | 3 | 5 | 16 | 19 | 59 | 22 | 4 | 144 | 89.54 |
| (England) Wayne Jones | 2 | 3 | 5 | 18 | 18 | 56 | 33 | 3 | 121 | 89.27 |
| (Netherlands) Jelle Klaasen | 1 | 1 | 3 | 7 | 10 | 18 | 8 | 4 | 110 | 88.83 |
| (Scotland) Robert Thornton | 3 | 8 | 6 | 26 | 27 | 80 | 43 | 8 | 105 | 88.81 |
| (Philippines) Christian Perez | 2 | 1 | 3 | 11 | 13 | 26 | 21 | 1 | 84 | 88.64 |
| (Sweden) Magnus Caris | 2 | 1 | 3 | 10 | 11 | 35 | 11 | 2 | 108 | 88.59 |
| (Northern Ireland) Brendan Dolan | 2 | 3 | 5 | 13 | 17 | 32 | 30 | 3 | 121 | 88.54 |
| (England) Andy Jenkins | 1 | 2 | 3 | 7 | 12 | 24 | 11 | 2 | 60 | 88.27 |
| (Austria) Mensur Suljović | 1 | 1 | 3 | 4 | 11 | 13 | 14 | 4 | 40 | 86.83 |
| (England) Peter Manley | 2 | 5 | 6 | 21 | 21 | 67 | 25 | 3 | 127 | 86.44 |
| (Canada) John Part | 2 | 4 | 4 | 17 | 14 | 27 | 11 | 6 | 167 | 85.98 |
| (England) Denis Ovens | 2 | 6 | 5 | 25 | 23 | 61 | 30 | 6 | 106 | 85.97 |
| (England) Matt Clark | 1 | 0 | 3 | 2 | 9 | 15 | 4 | 0 | 50 | 85.62 |
| (England) Andy Smith | 1 | 2 | 3 | 13 | 12 | 29 | 19 | 5 | 121 | 85.41 |
| (Netherlands) Roland Scholten | 1 | 2 | 3 | 8 | 12 | 33 | 15 | 2 | 116 | 84.90 |
| (England) Steve Hine | 2 | 3 | 6 | 12 | 8 | 34 | 19 | 4 | 100 | 84.85 |
| (Netherlands) Toon Greebe | 1 | 0 | 3 | 1 | 9 | 9 | 8 | 1 | 150 | 84.06 |
| (Scotland) Peter Wright | 1 | 1 | 3 | 6 | 9 | 18 | 9 | 1 | 106 | 83.75 |
| (Canada) Ken MacNeil | 2 | 2 | 3 | 15 | 14 | 40 | 16 | 4 | 124 | 83.17 |
| (New Zealand) Phillip Hazel | 1 | 0 | 0 | 2 | 4 | 7 | 5 | 1 | 36 | 83.15 |
| (Germany) Andree Welge | 1 | 0 | 3 | 3 | 9 | 14 | 5 | 1 | 48 | 83.10 |
| (England) Steve Maish | 1 | 1 | 3 | 6 | 10 | 22 | 9 | 1 | 136 | 82.78 |
| (Germany) Jyhan Artut | 2 | 4 | 4 | 15 | 14 | 41 | 23 | 4 | 78 | 82.73 |
| (Netherlands) Jan van der Rassel | 2 | 1 | 3 | 11 | 11 | 28 | 16 | 3 | 116 | 82.60 |
| (England) Alex Roy | 1 | 1 | 3 | 6 | 11 | 25 | 9 | 2 | 82 | 82.54 |
| (England) Kirk Shepherd | 3 | 8 | 5 | 25 | 24 | 50 | 23 | 11 | 109 | 82.45 |
| (Spain) Carlos Rodriguez | 1 | 0 | 3 | 2 | 9 | 16 | 4 | 2 | 60 | 82.07 |
| (Republic of Ireland) Aodhagan O'Neill | 2 | 0 | 3 | 5 | 11 | 12 | 11 | 0 | 74 | 81.91 |
| (Slovenia) Osmann Kijamet | 2 | 0 | 3 | 4 | 11 | 22 | 6 | 2 | 60 | 81.83 |
| (Denmark) Per Laursen | 1 | 0 | 0 | 3 | 4 | 10 | 2 | 0 | 116 | 81.45 |
| (United States) Darin Young | 2 | 3 | 6 | 14 | 25 | 47 | 12 | 6 | 86 | 80.26 |
| (Japan) Haruki Muramatsu | 2 | 0 | 3 | 5 | 10 | 20 | 5 | 2 | 75 | 79.91 |
| (Germany) Tomas Seyler | 1 | 0 | 0 | 1 | 4 | 5 | 3 | 1 | 40 | 79.66 |
| (Finland) Jarkko Komula | 2 | 0 | 3 | 8 | 12 | 30 | 9 | 1 | 90 | 79.41 |
| (South Africa) Les Francis | 1 | 0 | 0 | 2 | 4 | 8 | 3 | 0 | 116 | 79.16 |
| (New Zealand) Warren Parry | 1 | 0 | 3 | 0 | 9 | 7 | 3 | 2 | — | 78.89 |
| (England) Colin Monk | 1 | 0 | 3 | 0 | 9 | 5 | 7 | 0 | — | 77.66 |
| (Poland) Krzysztof Kciuk | 1 | 0 | 0 | 1 | 4 | 4 | 1 | 1 | 140 | 76.28 |
| (Guyana) Norman Madhoo | 1 | 0 | 0 | 2 | 4 | 11 | 2 | 0 | 80 | 76.25 |
| (Spain) Francisco Ruiz | 1 | 0 | 0 | 0 | 4 | 2 | 2 | 0 | — | 75.09 |
| (Gibraltar) Dylan Duo | 1 | 0 | 3 | 0 | 9 | 5 | 2 | 0 | — | 74.04 |
| (Russia) Roman Konchikov | 1 | 0 | 0 | 3 | 4 | 8 | 1 | 0 | 90 | 73.21 |
| (England) Wayne Mardle | 1 | 0 | 3 | 3 | 9 | 11 | 4 | 3 | 48 | 72.39 |
| (United States) Scott Burnett | 1 | 0 | 3 | 2 | 9 | 12 | 4 | 2 | 154 | 69.91 |

== Representation from different countries ==
This table shows the number of players by country in the World Championship, the total number including the preliminary round.

| | (England) ENG | (Netherlands) NED | (Scotland) SCO | (Wales) WAL | (Australia) AUS | (Austria) AUT | (Northern Ireland) NIR | (Germany) GER | (Spain) SPA | (South Africa) RSA | (Republic of Ireland) IRL | (Finland) FIN | (United States) USA | (Canada) CAN | (Guyana) GUY | (Japan) JPN | (New Zealand) NZL | (Russia) RUS | (Denmark) DEN | (Poland) POL | (Sweden) SWE | (Gibraltar) GIB | (Philippines) PHI | (Slovenia) SLO | Total |
|---|---|---|---|---|---|---|---|---|---|---|---|---|---|---|---|---|---|---|---|---|---|---|---|---|---|
| Final | 1 | 0 | 0 | 0 | 1 | 0 | 0 | 0 | 0 | 0 | 0 | 0 | 0 | 0 | 0 | 0 | 0 | 0 | 0 | 0 | 0 | 0 | 0 | 0 | 2 |
| Semis | 1 | 1 | 0 | 1 | 1 | 0 | 0 | 0 | 0 | 0 | 0 | 0 | 0 | 0 | 0 | 0 | 0 | 0 | 0 | 0 | 0 | 0 | 0 | 0 | 4 |
| Quarters | 4 | 2 | 0 | 1 | 1 | 0 | 0 | 0 | 0 | 0 | 0 | 0 | 0 | 0 | 0 | 0 | 0 | 0 | 0 | 0 | 0 | 0 | 0 | 0 | 8 |
| Round 3 | 11 | 2 | 1 | 1 | 1 | 0 | 0 | 0 | 0 | 0 | 0 | 0 | 0 | 0 | 0 | 0 | 0 | 0 | 0 | 0 | 0 | 0 | 0 | 0 | 16 |
| Round 2 | 19 | 4 | 2 | 2 | 1 | 0 | 1 | 1 | 0 | 0 | 0 | 0 | 1 | 1 | 0 | 0 | 0 | 0 | 0 | 0 | 0 | 0 | 0 | 0 | 32 |
| Round 1 | 32 | 8 | 3 | 2 | 2 | 1 | 1 | 2 | 1 | 0 | 1 | 1 | 2 | 2 | 0 | 1 | 1 | 0 | 0 | 0 | 1 | 1 | 1 | 1 | 64 |
| Prelim. | 0 | 1 | 0 | 0 | 0 | 0 | 0 | 1 | 1 | 1 | 1 | 1 | 0 | 1 | 1 | 1 | 1 | 1 | 1 | 1 | 1 | 0 | 1 | 1 | 16 |
| Total | 32 | 8 | 3 | 2 | 2 | 1 | 1 | 3 | 2 | 1 | 1 | 1 | 2 | 2 | 1 | 1 | 2 | 1 | 1 | 1 | 1 | 1 | 1 | 1 | 72 |

== Television coverage ==
As they had done for every WDC/PDC World Darts Championship, Sky Sports provided coverage in the UK, broadcasting all 72 matches live in high-definition. Dave Clark presented the coverage with analysis from Rod Harrington and Eric Bristow. They also commentated on matches along with Sid Waddell, John Gwynne, Dave Lanning, Nigel Pearson, Rod Studd and Stuart Pyke. Interviews were either handled by Clark, Bristow or Studd.

== Technical elements ==
Technical crew were supplied by Yorkshire-based Sports Event Services Limited, with Mark Leak heading up their crew and assuming the role of stage manager.
