= Darin Young =

American darts player

Personal information
- Nickname: "Big Daddy"
- Born: February 2, 1973 (age 53) White Haven, Pennsylvania, United States
- Home town: Mountain Top, Pennsylvania, United States

Sport
- Sport: Darts
- Playing since: 1992
- Darts: 23g Gen 2 Signature Cosmo Darts
- Laterality: Left-handed
- Walk-on music: "Daddy Cool" by Boney M.

Organisation (see split in darts)
- BDO: 2014–2017, 2018–2019
- PDC: 1999–2014, 2017–2018, 2019–

PDC premier events – best performances
- World Championship: Last 32: 2010
- Grand Slam: Last 16: 2008, 2009
- Desert Classic: Last 16: 2004, 2005, 2007, 2008
- US Open/WSoD: Last 16: 2010

Other tournament wins
- Years
ADO AT Dreams Come True Shootout	2011
ADO Cleveland Extravaganza	2011
ADO New York / New Jersey Open	2010, 2011
ADO Pacmania	2012
ADO Seacoast Open	2011, 2012
Charlotte Open	2008, 2009, 2015
Las Vegas Open	2006, 2008
Le Skratch Montreal Open	2008
North American Darts Ch'ship	2008
North American Pro Tour Sacramento	2013
PDC Spectacular	2015
Port City Open	2015
Soft Tip Bullshooter World Ch'hip	1999, 2000
Soft Tip Dartslive Japan	2014
USA Dart Classic	2004, 2005, 2008, 2012
Virginia Beach Dart Classic	2007, 2015, 2016, 2019
Windy City Open	2005
World Dart Series Las Vegas	2013
World Dart Series New Orleans	2013
CDC Pro Tour
CDC Pro Tour (Burlington)	2018
CDC Pro Tour (Miamisburg)	2018
CDC Pro Tour (Philadelphia)	2019 (2x)
CDC Pro Tour (Waterdown)	2019

Darin Young (born February 2, 1973) is an American professional darts player who competes in Professional Darts Corporation (PDC) events. His nickname is Big Daddy.

== Career ==
=== PDC ===
Young made his PDC World Darts Championship debut in 2005 where he lost in the first round to fellow left-hander Josephus Schenk. He returned a year later but lost again in the first round, this time losing 3–0 to Mark Dudbridge.

Young has appeared in five successive Las Vegas Desert Classics, reaching the second round in four of them. In 2004, he beat Lionel Sams in the first round before losing to Wayne Mardle. In 2005, he defeated Andy Hamilton in round one, but lost in the second round to Canadian John Part. 2006 saw a first round exit for Young in the Desert Classic, losing to Raymond van Barneveld, who was making his debut in the event. In 2007, Young defeated another Desert Classic debutant Tony Eccles in round one, but lost to Dennis Smith 8–7 in the second round. In the 2008 Desert Classic, Young defeated qualifier Martin Burchell in the first round before losing to Adrian Gray in the second round.

On the eve of the 2008 US Open, Young claimed the biggest win of his career, winning the North American Darts Championship, earning him $15,000. His performances made him the top ranked player in the North American Order of Merit, earning him a spot in the 2008 Grand Slam of Darts. He was drawn in Group F with Terry Jenkins, Colin Lloyd and Wildcard qualifier Wes Newton. Young won his opening group game against Jenkins, coming from 3–0 down to win 5–4. He lost his next group game to Newton but then defeated Lloyd to advance to the second round where he lost to van Barneveld.

Young qualified for the 2009 PDC World Darts Championship as the number one player in the American order of merit. He lost in the first round to Dutch teenager Michael van Gerwen. In the 2009 Grand Slam of Darts, Young again advanced from his group but again lost in the second round, in a last leg decider to Robert Thornton.

At the 2010 PDC World Darts Championship, Young defeated Andy Smith 3–2 in the first round, before losing in the second round 4–0 to Terry Jenkins. Young was then a finalist in the 2010 North American Dart Championship, beating 1994 World Matchplay Darts champion Larry Butler before losing to former three-time world champion John Part in the final.

He topped the North American order of merit once more to reach the 2011 World Championship, but was whitewashed 0–3 to Wes Newton.

Despite winning the first set in the 2012 World Championship first round against Colin Lloyd, Young would go on to lose the match 1–3. He then represented the United States with Gary Mawson in the 2012 PDC World Cup of Darts and reached the quarter-finals, where they were defeated by England 1–3, having beaten Germany in the second round. Young qualified for the 2013 PDC World Championship where, for the second year in a row, he was involved in a tight game with Colin Lloyd in the first round. He took the first set and also led 2–1, but was eventually edged out in a deciding set by six legs to four.

Young played in his third World Cup of Darts and first with Larry Butler in February 2013, but they finished bottom of Group F after losing 4–5 to Finland and 3–5 to Germany. He won two events on the North American Pro Tour during the year and finished runner-up in two others to top the Order of Merit. This earned Young a first round spot in the 2014 PDC World Championship where he suffered a nightmare on doubles against Mervyn King as he could only hit one out of twenty to lose 3–0. In the second round of the 2014 World Cup of Darts, Butler lost to England's Phil Taylor, but Young beat Adrian Lewis meaning a doubles match was required to settle the tie which the United States pair lost 4–1. In September he won the Japanese Soft Tip event by beating Shintaro Inoue in the final. Young also reached the final of the Las Vegas event but lost to Boris Krčmar.

In 2015, Young claimed the Port City Open, Virginia Beach Dart Classic and the PDC Spectacular, the latter of which earned him a place in the 2016 World Championship. He won the first set against Terry Jenkins, but went on to lose 3–1 which marks Young's fifth successive first round exit in the event. Young retained his Virginia Beach Dart Classic title and lost in the final of the North American Qualifier for the 2017 World Championship. At the 2017 World Cup Team USA beat Italy 5–1 in the first round and Young lost 4–1 to Michael van Gerwen in round two, but Butler defeated Raymond van Barneveld 4–2 to send the match into a deciding doubles game which the Netherlands won 4–0.

In the 2020 World Championship, which Young qualified for by being the highest ranked player from the United States on the CDC rankings, he beat Raymond van Barneveld 3–1 in the first round. In round 2, he lost to Jeffrey de Zwaan, after having one match dart at double 8 to win 3–1.

== World Championship results ==
=== PDC ===
- 2005: First round (lost to Josephus Schenk 2–3)
- 2006: First round (lost to Mark Dudbridge 0–3)
- 2009: First round (lost to Michael van Gerwen 1–3)
- 2010: Second round (lost to Terry Jenkins 0–4)
- 2011: First round (lost to Wes Newton 0–3)
- 2012: First round (lost to Colin Lloyd 1–3)
- 2013: First round (lost to Colin Lloyd 2–3)
- 2014: First round (lost to Mervyn King 0–3)
- 2016: First round (lost to Terry Jenkins 1–3)
- 2020: Second round (lost to Jeffrey de Zwaan 2–3)

== Performance timeline ==
Tournament	2004	2005	2006	2007	2008	2009	2010	2011	2012	2013	2014	2015	2016	2017	2018	2019	2020
PDC World Championship	DNQ	1R	1R	DNQ		1R	2R	1R	1R	1R	1R	BDO	1R	BDO	DNQ	BDO	2R
Grand Slam of Darts	Did not qualify				2R	2R	Did not qualify										
Non-ranking televised events
PDC World Cup of Darts	Not held						QF	NH	QF	1R	2R	1R	1R	2R	1R	2R	DNQ
Past major events
Las Vegas Desert Classic	2R	2R	1R	2R	2R	1R	Not held										
