= Toon Greebe =

Dutch darts player (1988–2023)

Personal information
- Born: 25 September 1988 The Hague, Netherlands
- Died: 16 October 2023 (aged 35) Amsterdam, Netherlands
- Home town: 's-Hertogenbosch, Netherlands

Sport
- Sport: Darts
- Playing since: 1997
- Darts: 24g
- Laterality: Right-handed
- Walk-on music: "Let's Get It On" by Marvin Gaye

Organisation (see split in darts)
- BDO: 2010–2012, 2015–2020
- PDC: 2006–2010, 2012–2013
- WDF: 2010–2012, 2015–2022

WDF major events – best performances
- World Masters: Last 16: 2017

PDC premier events – best performances
- World Championship: Last 64: 2008, 2010
- UK Open: Last 96: 2009
- US Open/WSoD: Last 64: 2007

Other tournament wins
- Tournament: Years
- Falkie Open Martzicht Open Open Dussen Open Groenlo Open Oost Nederland Polish Open: 2010; 2010; 2013; 2011; 2009; 2019

Toon Greebe (25 September 1988 – 16 October 2023) was a Dutch professional darts player who played in Professional Darts Corporation (PDC) and World Darts Federation (WDF) tournaments.

== Career ==
Greebe reached the quarter-finals of the 2007 Dutch Open. He beat Spain's Carlos Rodriguez in the last 32 stages and then defeated Stephen Bunting in the last 16, eventually losing to fellow Dutchman Edwin Max. Greebe then began playing in PDC tournaments, reaching the third round of the 2007 US Open, losing 3–1 in sets to Phil Taylor. He then suffered a first round exit in the 2007 UK Open, losing to Steve Cusick of England.

Greebe qualified for the 2008 PDC World Darts Championship, losing in the first round 3–2 in sets to Peter Manley. Afterwards, Greebe began playing for the BDO/WDF again, reaching the quarter-finals in the 2008 Isle of Man Open. But in August 2008, he once more played in the PDC Pro Tour, reaching the second round of the PDC German Players Championship, beating Erwin Extercatte before losing to Mark Dudbridge.

Greebe joined the PDC Pro Tour full-time shortly afterwards and he slowly climbed up the order of merit since with numerous last 16 placings as well as a quarter-final place in the PDPA Players Championship in Nuland and Wales. Greebe also lost 32 kg in weight which received much praise from fellow players and commentators, in particular Rod Harrington who has stated for years that darts players need to keep fit and in shape to compete.

Greebe qualified for the 2010 PDC World Darts Championship through the European Order of Merit but lost in the first round to John Part.

Greebe then left the PDPA due to sponsorship issues and rejoined the BDO circuit. In his first tournament since returning to the BDO, Greebe reached the final of the Welsh Open having beaten Scott Waites, Scott Mitchell, Joey ten Berge, Phill Nixon and Mark Barilli before losing to Paul Jennings. He then reached the quarter finals of the Swiss Open and the semi-finals of the England Open.

Greebe reached the final of the 2017 German Open, losing to world number one Mark McGeeney. In December of that year, Greebe was admitted to hospital with a severe infection and had to have one of his feet amputated.

In May 2019, Greebe won the Police Open beating Sebastian Steyer 6–3 to claim the trophy in Poland.

== Health issues and death ==
In late 2022, Greebe had to have his lower left leg amputated.

Toon Greebe died on 16 October 2023, at the age of 35.

== World Championship Results ==
=== PDC ===
- 2008: 1st Round (lost to Peter Manley 2–3) (sets)
- 2010: 1st Round (lost to John Part 0–3)
