= 2007 Las Vegas Desert Classic =

The 2007 SBets.net Las Vegas Desert Classic (also billed as Las Vegas Desert Classic VI) was the sixth time that the Professional Darts Corporation staged the Las Vegas Desert Classic. The tournament was held at the Mandalay Bay Resort and Casino for the second successive year and was staged between July 3–8, televised on Sky Sports from July 4. There was no title sponsor for the event after PartyPoker.net's sponsorship lasted for just one year.

The opening day of the tournament saw a few surprise results, including Mark Dudbridge defeating three-time Desert Classic champion Phil Taylor 6–5.

Raymond van Barneveld secured his third major PDC title of the year, adding to his World Championship and UK Open successes, by beating Terry Jenkins 13–6 in the final, with a tournament average of 101.24.

== Prize money ==
The prize fund increased for the 2007 event to a total of £120,000. A further £6,400 was also made available for the PDPA qualifying events.

Stage (no. of players)		Prize money (Total: £120,000)
Winner	(1)	£20,000
Runner-up	(1)	£10,000
Semi-finalists	(2)	£7,000
Quarter-finalists	(4)	£5,000
Last 16	(8)	£3,000
Last 32	(16)	£2,000

== Qualification ==
Following the 2007 UK Open at the beginning of June, the top 12 players of the PDC Order of Merit were automatically qualified. They were joined by 4 North American qualifiers from qualification tournaments across the United States and Canada, and 16 further places decided at two qualification days on the eve of the tournament itself. These qualifying events were for lower ranked PDPA members and US residents. Eight players each day joined the automatic qualifiers in the first round of the main event.

PDC Order of Merit

1. Phil Taylor
2. Raymond van Barneveld
3. Colin Lloyd
4. Peter Manley
5. Terry Jenkins
6. Dennis Priestley
7. Adrian Lewis
8. Wayne Mardle
9. Roland Scholten
10. Andy Hamilton
11. James Wade
12. John Part

North American qualifiers

- Darin Young
- John Kuczynski
- Gary Mawson
- Gerry Convery

PDPA qualifier 1

- Wes Newton
- Steve Maish
- Kevin Painter
- Steve Beaton
- Colin Osborne
- Mervyn King
- Ray Carver
- Dennis Smith

PDPA qualifier 2

- Alan Tabern
- Mark Dudbridge
- John Ferrell
- Tony Eccles
- Stuart Holden
- Andy Smith
- Steve Smith
- Vincent van der Voort

== Results ==
A random draw was held after each round meaning no seedings were applied.

=== First round ===
Player	Score	Player	Player	Score	Player
Darin Young 92.37	6 – 3	Tony Eccles 93.60	Mark Dudbridge 90.39	6 – 5	Phil Taylor 91.98
Mervyn King 90.45	6 – 1	Gerry Convery 84.39	Alan Tabern 92.37	6 – 5	John Kuczynski 87.12
Roland Scholten 90.81	6 – 4	Andy Smith 78.03	John Part 96.84	6 – 4	Steve Maish 97.08
Wes Newton 101.37	6 – 3	Colin Lloyd 97.65	Colin Osborne 98.13	6 – 5	James Wade 95.70
Gary Mawson 87.90	6 – 2	Stuart Holden 81.09	Peter Manley 93.99	6 – 4	Vincent van der Voort 90.24
Raymond van Barneveld 102.84	6 – 1	Kevin Painter 92.31	Dennis Smith 96.45	6 – 5	Dennis Priestley 94.77
Steve Beaton 83.19	6 – 5	Andy Hamilton 83.94	Adrian Lewis 93.09	6 – 3	Steve Smith 82.44
Terry Jenkins 90.60	6 – 3	Ray Carver 88.80	Wayne Mardle 85.23	6 – 3	John Ferrell 85.62

=== Second round ===
Player	Score	Player	Player	Score	Player
Roland Scholten 88.62	8 – 5	Steve Beaton 85.32	Terry Jenkins 86.37	8 – 7	Wes Newton 84.66
Peter Manley 87.42	8 – 4	Colin Osborne 87.33	Adrian Lewis 93.00	8 – 6	Mervyn King 89.28
Raymond van Barneveld 98.97	8 – 1	Wayne Mardle 91.74	John Part 92.70	8 – 7	Mark Dudbridge 88.68
Dennis Smith 86.79	8 – 7	Darin Young 92.10	Gary Mawson 86.19	8 – 6	Alan Tabern 83.04

=== Quarter-finals ===
Player	Score	Player
John Part 92.55	10 – 9	Dennis Smith 87.15
Peter Manley 88.65	10 – 8	Adrian Lewis 89.40
Raymond van Barneveld 101.40	10 – 4	Roland Scholten 93.75
Terry Jenkins 96.18	10 – 7	Gary Mawson 92.34

=== Semi-finals and Final ===
Semi-finals
Raymond van Barneveld 101.43	11
John Part 100.86	7
Terry Jenkins 97.95	11
Peter Manley 88.92	8

Final
Raymond van Barneveld 101.55	13
Terry Jenkins 92.37	6

== Television coverage ==
Sky Sports broadcast the event live in the UK & Ireland for the 6th year running. The final between van Barneveld & Jenkins achieved viewing figures of 82,000 - although that was surpassed by other matches during the week.
Wednesday 120,000 (SS1) & 65,000 (SS2)
Thursday 90,000 (SS1) & 115,000 (SS2)
Friday unavailable
Saturday 87,000 (SS2)
Sunday 82,000 (SS1)

== Players Championship ==
On the eve of the Las Vegas Desert Classic, a PDPA Players Championship event was held on Sunday July 1 and was won by Raymond van Barneveld.
