= 2002 Las Vegas Desert Classic =

Tournament information
- Dates: 4–7 July 2002
- Venue: MGM Grand Casino and Hotel
- Location: Las Vegas, Nevada
- Country: United States
- Organisation(s): PDC
- Format: Sets; Final – best of 5
- Prize fund: $58,000
- Winner's share: $20,000

Champion(s)
- (England) Phil Taylor

The 2002 Las Vegas Desert Classic was the inaugural staging of a darts tournament by the Professional Darts Corporation. It featured the top players from the PDC along with an opportunity for players from North America to qualify. Over 200 players entered the event, but the last 16 featured mostly British-based players – the only exceptions being Roland Scholten and former World Champion John Part who participate regularly in UK tournaments.

This event featured an unusual format - sets were played over the best of seven legs, rather than the more standard best of five or three legs.

The total prize fund was US$58,000 and Phil Taylor won the title beating Ronnie Baxter in the final.

== Prize Fund ==
Stage (no. of players)		Prize money (Total: $58,000)
Winner	(1)	$20,000
Runner-Up	(1)	$10,000
Semi-finalists	(2)	$5,000
Quarter-finalists	(4)	$2,500
Round 1 Losers	(8)	$1,000

== Results ==
=== Men's tournament ===
==== Preliminary round ====
Player	Score	Player
(England) Kevin Painter	2 – 0	(England) Rod Harrington
(England) Denis Ovens	2 – 1	(England) Steve Beaton
(England) Simon Whatley	2 – 1	(England) Wes Newton
(England) Lee Palfreyman	2 – 0	(Singapore) Paul Lim
(England) Wayne Mardle	2 – 1	(England) Dave Askew
(England) Dennis Priestley	2 – 0	(England) Alex Roy
(Netherlands) Roland Scholten	2 – 1	(Scotland) Jamie Harvey
(England) Andy Jenkins	2 – 0	(England) Bob Anderson

==== Main Round 4-7 July ====
1st Round (best of 3 sets) (best of 7 legs); July 4–5
(England) Phil Taylor 93.48	2
(England) Kevin Painter 89.13	1
(England) Denis Ovens 98.31	2
(England) Peter Manley 85.95	0
(England) Lee Palfreyman 96.63	2
(England) Colin Lloyd 86.76	0
(England) Simon Whatley 84.93	2
(England) Dennis Smith 79.98	0
(England) Ronnie Baxter 87.90	2
(England) Andy Jenkins 83.40	0
(Canada) John Part 92.13	2
(Wales) Richie Burnett 83.07	0
(Netherlands) Roland Scholten 86.61	2
(England) Dennis Priestley 88.74	0
(England) Wayne Mardle 97.53	2
(England) Alan Warriner 93.90	0

Quarter-finals (best of 3 sets) (best of 7 legs); July 6
(England) Phil Taylor 94.38	2
(England) Denis Ovens 87.93	0
(England) Lee Palfreyman 88.50	2
(England) Simon Whatley 85.92	0
(England) Ronnie Baxter 90.54	2
(Canada) John Part 89.52	1
(Netherlands) Roland Scholten 91.50	2
(England) Wayne Mardle 96.99	0

Semi-finals (best of 5 sets) (best of 7 legs); July 7
(England) Phil Taylor 100.98	3
(England) Lee Palfreyman 85.95	0
(England) Ronnie Baxter 95.76	3
(Netherlands) Roland Scholten 92.25	1

Final (best of 5 sets) (best of 7 legs); July 7
(England) Phil Taylor 103.98	3
(England) Ronnie Baxter 98.46	0

=== Women's tournament ===
Semi-finals (best of 3 sets) (best of 5 legs)
(England) Deta Hedman	2
(United States) Carolyn Mars	0
(England) Crissy Manley	2
(United States) Stacy Bromberg	1

Final (best of 3 sets) (best of 5 legs)
(England) Deta Hedman	2
(England) Crissy Manley	1
