= Las Vegas Desert Classic =

Former American darts tournament

- Sport: Darts
- Founded: 2002
- First season: 2002
- Folded: 2010
- Country: United States
- Venues: MGM Grand (2002–2005); Mandalay Bay Resort (2006–2009)
- Last champion: (England) Phil Taylor (2009)
- Tournament format: Legs; Sets

The Las Vegas Desert Classic was a darts tournament, organized by the Professional Darts Corporation (PDC) and was held each year in July from 2002 until 2009. Its original venue was the MGM Grand Casino and Hotel, Las Vegas, Nevada from 2002 to 2005, but the tournament moved down the strip to the Mandalay Bay Resort and Casino from 2006 to 2009.

== History ==
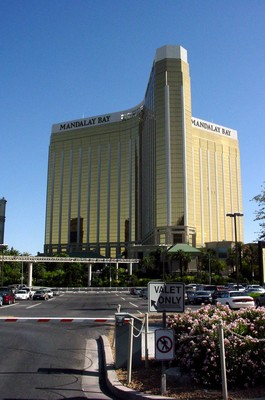
The Mandalay Bay Resort and Casino where the tournament was held from 2006 to 2009

The tournament carried a total prize purse of US$250,000. Due to the time difference between the UK and US, the matches were played in the morning local time – which is prime-time evening in the UK where the tournament was broadcast live on Sky Sports.

Initially Fox Sports World transmitted the tournament live but in recent years they broadcast recorded coverage in the United States. Partypoker.net became the first sponsors of the event in 2006.

The format of the Classic changed over the years. In 2002, the tournament had a sets format with best of 7 legs per set. In 2003, the tournament had a legs only format throughout with a round robin group stage of 8 groups with 3 players each, before it became straight knockout from the quarter-finals onwards. In 2004 and 2005, the tournament reverted to straight knockout with a sets format with best of 5 legs per set throughout. In 2006, the tournament had a legs only format in the Last 32, before reverting to a sets format with best of 5 legs per set for the Last 16, Quarter-finals, Semi-finals and the Final. From 2007 to 2009, the tournament remained straight knockout but moved back to a legs only format throughout.

Phil Taylor won the title five times out of the eight years the event was staged. Peter Manley, John Part and Raymond van Barneveld were the only other winners of the event.

The Las Vegas Desert Classic tournament was retired in 2010 and a new tournament held in Las Vegas, the Tropicana World Series, has been put in its place. However, the tournament is not televised.

== Las Vegas Desert Classic Finals ==
| Year | Champion (average in final) | Score | Runner-up (average in final) | Prize Money | | | Sponsor | Venue |
| Year | Champion (average in final) | Score | Runner-up (average in final) | Total | Champion | Runner-up | Sponsor | Venue |
|---|---|---|---|---|---|---|---|---|
| 2002 | (England) Phil Taylor (103.98) | 3–0 (s) | (England) Ronnie Baxter (98.46) | $58,000 | $20,000 | $10,000 | None | MGM Grand Casino and Hotel |
| 2003 | (England) Peter Manley (96.81) | 16–12 (l) | (Canada) John Part (95.07) | $88,000 | $22,000 | $10,000 | None | MGM Grand Casino and Hotel |
| 2004 | (England) Phil Taylor (100.80) | 6–4 (s) | (England) Wayne Mardle (95.22) | £84,100 | £15,000 | £7,500 | None | MGM Grand Casino and Hotel |
| 2005 | (England) Phil Taylor (101.97) | 6–1 (s) | (England) Wayne Mardle (94.77) | £84,100 | £15,000 | £7,500 | None | MGM Grand Casino and Hotel |
| 2006 | (Canada) John Part (92.79) | 6–3 (s) | (Netherlands) Raymond van Barneveld (92.85) | £90,500 | £15,000 | £7,500 | PartyPoker.com | Mandalay Bay Resort and Casino |
| 2007 | (Netherlands) Raymond van Barneveld (101.55) | 13–6 (l) | (England) Terry Jenkins (92.37) | £120,000 | £20,000 | £10,000 | None | Mandalay Bay Resort and Casino |
| 2008 | (England) Phil Taylor (105.53) | 13–7 (l) | (England) James Wade (92.26) | £120,000 | £20,000 | £10,000 | PartyPoker.com | Mandalay Bay Resort and Casino |
| 2009 | (England) Phil Taylor (102.21) | 13–11 (l) | (Netherlands) Raymond van Barneveld (98.52) | £182,000 | £30,000 | £15,000 | PartyPoker.com | Mandalay Bay Resort and Casino |

== Women's Desert Classic Finals ==
| Year | Champion | Score | Runner-up | Prize Money | | | Sponsor | Venue |
| Year | Champion | Score | Runner-up | Total | Champion | Runner-up | Sponsor | Venue |
|---|---|---|---|---|---|---|---|---|
| 2002 | (England) Deta Hedman | 2–1 (s) | (England) Crissy Manley | £50,000 | £25,000 | £10,000 | PartyPoker.com | MGM Grand Casino and Hotel |
| 2003 | (United States) Stacy Bromberg | 6–4 (l) | (England) Deta Hedman | £50,000 | £25,000 | £10,000 | PartyPoker.com | MGM Grand Casino and Hotel |
| 2004 | (England) Trina Gulliver | 6–5 (l) | (United States) Stacy Bromberg | £50,000 | £25,000 | £10,000 | PartyPoker.com | MGM Grand Casino and Hotel |
| 2005 | (England) Trina Gulliver | 6–1 (l) | (England) Deta Hedman | £50,000 | £25,000 | £10,000 | PartyPoker.com | MGM Grand Casino and Hotel |

== Media coverage ==
The Las Vegas Desert Classic was broadcast in the UK by Sky Sports from the first to the last tournament.

Presenters of Sky Sports

- Jeff Stelling (2002, 2005)
- Dave Clark (2003–2004, 2006–2009)

Co-presenters

- Eric Bristow (2002–2005)
- Rod Harrington (2005–2009)

Commentators

- Sid Waddell (2002–2009)
- Dave Lanning (2002–2009)
- John Gwynne (2002–2009)
- Nigel Pearson (2007–2009)
