= 2008 PDC Pro Tour =

The 2008 PDC Pro Tour was a series of non-televised darts tournaments organised by the Professional Darts Corporation (PDC). They consisted of Professional Dart Players Association (PDPA) Players Championships and UK Open Regional Finals.

== Prize money ==
Stage	Players Championships	UK Open Qualifiers
Second round	£75	£100
Third round	£150	£200
Fourth round	£300	£400
Quarter-finals	£600	£800
Semi-finals	£1,250	£1,600
Final	£2,500	£3,000
Winner	£5,000	£6,000

== Players Championships ==
(All matches – Best of 5 sets, Best of 3 legs per set)

=== Players Championship 1 ===
- Stan James Players Championship 1 was contested in Gibraltar on 19 January

Quarter-finals		Semi-finals		Final
(England) Chris Mason	3
(England) Steve Beaton	2	(England) Chris Mason	3
(England) Alan Tabern	3	(England) Alan Tabern	0
(England) Andy Smith	2			(England) Chris Mason	1
(Canada) John Part	3			(Canada) John Part	3
(England) Alex Roy	1	(Canada) John Part	3
(England) Andy Jenkins	3	(England) Andy Jenkins	0
(England) Kevin Painter	2

Final (Canada) John Part 3–1 Chris Mason (England) (2–1, 1–2, 2–0, 2–1)

=== Players Championship 2 ===
- Stan James Players Championship 2 was contested in Gibraltar on 20 January

Quarter-finals		Semi-finals		Final
(England) Kevin McDine	3
(England) Steve Beaton	0	(England) Kevin McDine	2
(England) Denis Ovens	3	(England) Denis Ovens	3
(England) John Ferrell	2			(England) Denis Ovens	1
(England) James Wade	3			(England) James Wade	3
(England) Alex Roy	0	(England) James Wade	3
(England) Mervyn King	3	(England) Mervyn King	2
(England) Kevin Painter	2

Final (England) James Wade 3–1 Denis Ovens (England) (2–1, 2–0, 0–2, 2–1)

=== Players Championship 3 ===
- Players Championship 3 was contested at the Brentwood Centre, Essex on 1 March

Quarter-finals		Semi-finals		Final
(England) Phil Taylor	3
(England) Wayne Mardle	0	(England) Phil Taylor	3
(England) Adrian Lewis	3	(England) Adrian Lewis	0
(England) Mervyn King	1			(England) Phil Taylor	3
(England) James Wade	3			(England) James Wade	0
(Netherlands) Roland Scholten	1	(England) James Wade	3
(England) Andy Hamilton	3	(England) Andy Hamilton	2
(England) Kevin McDine	0

Final (England) Phil Taylor 3–0 James Wade (England) (2–1, 2–0, 2–0)

=== Players Championship 4 ===
- Players Championship 4 was contested at the JJB Stadium, Wigan on 15 March

Quarter-finals		Semi-finals		Final
(England) Wayne Mardle	3
(England) Ronnie Baxter	0	(England) Wayne Mardle	1
(England) Alan Tabern	3	(England) Alan Tabern	3
(England) Mervyn King	1			(England) Alan Tabern	3
(England) Chris Mason	3			(England) Chris Mason	0
(Netherlands) Roland Scholten	1	(England) Chris Mason	3
(Netherlands) Michael van Gerwen	3	(Netherlands) Michael van Gerwen	1
(England) Kevin Dowling	0

Final (England) Alan Tabern 3–0 Chris Mason (England) (2–1, 2–1, 2–0)

=== Players Championship 5 ===
- Players Championship 5 was contested at the Ramada Hotel, Bad Soden, Germany on 22 March

Quarter-finals		Semi-finals		Final
(Netherlands) Raymond van Barneveld	3
(England) Wayne Mardle	1	(Netherlands) Raymond van Barneveld	3
(England) Alan Tabern	3	(England) Alan Tabern	2
(England) Wayne Jones	1			(Netherlands) Raymond van Barneveld	1
(England) Phil Taylor	3			(England) Phil Taylor	3
(Netherlands) Roland Scholten	0	(England) Phil Taylor	3
(England) Andy Hamilton	3	(England) Andy Hamilton	1
(England) James Wade	2

Final (England) Phil Taylor 3–1 Raymond van Barneveld (Netherlands) (2–0, 1–2, 2–1, 2–1)

=== Players Championship 6 ===
- Players Championship 6 was contested at the Ramada Hotel, Bad Soden, Germany on 23 March

Quarter-finals		Semi-finals		Final
(Netherlands) Vincent van der Voort	3
(England) James Wade	0	(Netherlands) Vincent van der Voort	0
(England) Phil Taylor	3	(England) Phil Taylor	3
(Netherlands) Roland Scholten	0			(England) Phil Taylor	3
(England) Wayne Jones	3			(England) Wayne Jones	1
(England) Adrian Lewis	0	(England) Wayne Jones	3
(England) Tony Eccles	3	(England) Tony Eccles	0
(England) Steve Maish	1

Final (England) Phil Taylor 3–1 Wayne Jones (England) (2–0, 2–0, 1–2, 2–1)

=== Players Championship 7 ===
- Players Championship 7 was contested at the International Centre, Telford on 29 March

Quarter-finals		Semi-finals		Final
(England) Colin Lloyd	3
(Netherlands) Raymond van Barneveld	2	(England) Colin Lloyd	3
(England) Alan Tabern	3	(England) Alan Tabern	0
(England) Wayne Jones	2			(England) Colin Lloyd	0
(England) Phil Taylor	3			(England) Phil Taylor	3
(England) Kevin McDine	2	(England) Phil Taylor	3
(England) Mark Frost	3	(England) Mark Frost	0
(Netherlands) Vincent van der Voort	1

Final (England) Phil Taylor 3–0 Colin Lloyd (England) (2–1, 2–1, 2–1)

=== Players Championship 8 ===
- Antwerp Darts Trophy (Players Championship 8) was contested at the Waasland Expohallen, Temse on 12 April

Quarter-finals		Semi-finals		Final
(England) Colin Lloyd	3
(England) Mark Dudbridge	0	(England) Colin Lloyd	2
(England) Andy Smith	3	(England) Andy Smith	3
(England) Dave Askew	0			(England) Andy Smith	0
(England) Ronnie Baxter	3			(England) Phil Taylor	3
(Austria) Mensur Suljović	0	(England) Ronnie Baxter	0
(England) Phil Taylor	3	(England) Phil Taylor	3
(England) Andy Hamilton	2

Final (England) Phil Taylor 3–0 Andy Smith (England) (2–0, 2–1, 2–1)

=== Players Championship 9 ===
- Scottish Sun Players Championship 9 was contested at the Thistle Hotel, Glasgow on 19 April

Quarter-finals		Semi-finals		Final
(England) Mervyn King	3
(England) Kevin McDine	0	(England) Mervyn King	3
(Republic of Ireland) Mick McGowan	3	(Republic of Ireland) Mick McGowan	0
(England) Colin Osborne	2			(England) Mervyn King	3
(Netherlands) Vincent van der Voort	3			(England) Mark Dudbridge	0
(England) Mark Walsh	2	(Netherlands) Vincent van der Voort	2
(England) Mark Dudbridge	3	(England) Mark Dudbridge	3
(England) Ronnie Baxter	0

Final (England) Mervyn King 3–0 Mark Dudbridge (England) (2–0, 2–0, 2–0)

=== Players Championship 10 ===
- Amsterdam Casino Open Holland Masters (Players Championship 10) on 26 April

Quarter-finals		Semi-finals		Final
(Netherlands) Raymond van Barneveld	3
(England) Mark Walsh	0	(Netherlands) Raymond van Barneveld	3
(Wales) Wayne Atwood	3	(Wales) Wayne Atwood	1
(England) Mervyn King	0			(Netherlands) Raymond van Barneveld	3
(England) Colin Osborne	3			(England) Colin Osborne	0
(Netherlands) Jan van der Rassel	2	(England) Colin Osborne	3
(England) Kevin Painter	disqualified	bye	bye
(England) Adrian Lewis	disqualified

Final (Netherlands) Raymond van Barneveld 3–0 Colin Osborne (England) (2–0, 2–0, 2–1)

- Thialf Darts Trophy in Heerenveen on June 1

Event cancelled

=== Players Championship 11 ===
- Players Championship 11 was contested in Ashton Gate, Bristol on 14 June

Quarter-finals		Semi-finals		Final
(England) Denis Ovens	3
(Netherlands) Vincent van der Voort	2	(England) Denis Ovens	1
(England) Alan Tabern	3	(England) Alan Tabern	3
(Northern Ireland) Brendan Dolan	2			(England) Alan Tabern	0
(England) Matt Clark	3			(England) Phil Taylor	3
(England) Dennis Priestley	2	(England) Matt Clark	0
(England) Phil Taylor	3	(England) Phil Taylor	3
(England) Peter Manley	1

Final (England) Phil Taylor 3–0 Alan Tabern (England) (2–1, 2–1, 2–0)

=== Players Championship 12 ===
- Players Championship 12 was contested in Ashton Gate, Bristol on 15 June

Quarter-finals		Semi-finals		Final
(England) Kevin Painter	3
(Netherlands) Jelle Klaasen	1	(England) Kevin Painter	3
(England) Adrian Lewis	3	(England) Adrian Lewis	1
(England) Gary Welding	1			(England) Kevin Painter	2
(England) Dennis Priestley	3			(England) Dennis Priestley	3
(England) Colin Osborne	2	(England) Dennis Priestley	3
(England) James Wade	3	(England) James Wade	2
(England) Colin Lloyd	0

Final (England) Dennis Priestley 3–2 Kevin Painter (England) (2–0, 2–0, 1–2, 0–2, 2–0)

=== Players Championship 13 ===
- Players Championship 13 at Mandalay Bay Resort and Casino, Las Vegas, Nevada on June 29

Quarter-finals		Semi-finals		Final
(Germany) Michael Rosenauer	3
(England) Mark Frost	2	(Germany) Michael Rosenauer	0
(England) Ronnie Baxter	3	(England) Ronnie Baxter	3
(England) Terry Jenkins	2			(England) Ronnie Baxter	1
(England) Phil Taylor	3			(England) Phil Taylor	3
(Netherlands) Michael van Gerwen	1	(England) Phil Taylor	3
(England) Mark Walsh	3	(England) Mark Walsh	1
(England) James Wade	1

Final (England) Phil Taylor 3–1 Ronnie Baxter (England) (2–1, 0–2, 2–0, 2–0)

=== Players Championship 14 ===
- Bobby Bourn Memorial Trophy at the Winter Gardens, Blackpool on 19 July

Quarter-finals		Semi-finals		Final
(England) Phil Taylor	3
(England) Colin Lloyd	1	(England) Phil Taylor	3
(Canada) John Part	3	(Canada) John Part	1
(England) Dennis Priestley	1			(England) Phil Taylor	3
(Netherlands) Raymond van Barneveld	3			(England) Ronnie Baxter	0
(England) Wayne Mardle	1	(Netherlands) Raymond van Barneveld	2
(England) Ronnie Baxter	3	(England) Ronnie Baxter	3
(England) Nick Fulwell	2

=== Players Championship 15 ===
- Australian Open Players Championship 15 was contested in Shoalhaven, New South Wales, Australia on 10 August

Quarter-finals		Semi-finals		Final
(Scotland) Robert Thornton	3
(Australia) Russell Stewart	2	(Scotland) Robert Thornton	3
(United States) Gary Mawson	3	(United States) Gary Mawson	0
(Australia) Brian Roach	1			(Scotland) Robert Thornton	3
(Australia) Paul Nicholson	3			(Australia) Paul Nicholson	1
(England) Dave Honey	0	(Australia) Paul Nicholson	3
(Australia) Pat Orreal	3	(Australia) Pat Orreal	0
(New Zealand) Warren French	0

=== Players Championship 16 ===
- Kitchener Open Players Championship 16 in Kitchener, Canada on 17 August

Quarter-finals		Semi-finals		Final
(England) Lionel Sams	3
(England) Adrian Gray	0	(England) Lionel Sams	3
(England) Denis Ovens	3	(England) Denis Ovens	2
(England) Ronnie Baxter	1			(England) Lionel Sams	1
(Scotland) Robert Thornton	3			(England) Dennis Priestley	3
(England) Steve Cusick	1	(Scotland) Robert Thornton	0
(England) Dennis Priestley	3	(England) Dennis Priestley	3
(England) Andy Jenkins	1

=== Players Championship 17 ===
- Peachtree Open Players Championship 17 in Atlanta, Georgia on 24 August

Quarter-finals		Semi-finals		Final
(England) Steve Beaton	3
(England) Ronnie Baxter	1	(England) Steve Beaton	2
(England) Andy Hamilton	3	(England) Andy Hamilton	3
(United States) Darin Young	2			(England) Andy Hamilton	1
(England) Alan Tabern	3			(England) Alan Tabern	3
(United States) Roger Carter	2	(England) Alan Tabern	3
(United States) Chris White	3	(United States) Chris White	2
(United States) Gary Mawson	2

=== Players Championship 18 ===
- Players Championship 18 in Koningshof, Netherlands on 30 August

Quarter-finals		Semi-finals		Final
(England) Phil Taylor	3
(Northern Ireland) John MaGowan	0	(England) Phil Taylor	3
(England) Andy Hamilton	3	(England) Andy Hamilton	1
(England) Colin Lloyd	0			(England) Phil Taylor	3
(England) James Wade	3			(England) James Wade	1
(England) Colin Osborne	1	(England) James Wade	3
(England) Tony Eccles	3	(England) Tony Eccles	1
(England) Kevin Painter	0

=== Players Championship 19 ===
- Players Championship 19 in Koningshof, Netherlands on 31 August

Quarter-finals		Semi-finals		Final
(England) Phil Taylor	3
(England) Ronnie Baxter	0	(England) Phil Taylor	3
(Scotland) Robert Thornton	3	(Scotland) Robert Thornton	1
(England) Mervyn King	0			(England) Phil Taylor	3
(England) Wayne Jones	3			(England) Terry Jenkins	0
(England) James Wade	1	(England) Wayne Jones	1
(England) Terry Jenkins	3	(England) Terry Jenkins	3
(England) Kevin Painter	1

=== Players Championship 20 ===
- Ireland Open Autumn Classic (Players Championship 20) at Dromore Leisure Complex, Dromore, County Tyrone on 6 September

Quarter-finals		Semi-finals		Final
(England) Mark Walsh	3
(England) Mervyn King	0	(England) Mark Walsh	2
(England) Chris Mason	3	(England) Chris Mason	3
(England) Alex Roy	1			(England) Chris Mason	1
(Northern Ireland) Felix McBrearty	3			(Northern Ireland) Felix McBrearty	3
(England) Andy Hamilton	2	(Northern Ireland) Felix McBrearty	3
(England) Colin Lloyd	3	(England) Colin Lloyd	0
(Scotland) Robert Thornton	2

Final (Northern Ireland) Felix McBrearty 3–1 Chris Mason (England) (0–2, 2–0, 2–0, 2–0)

=== Players Championship 21 ===
- Windy City Open (Players Championship 21) in Chicago, Illinois on 14 September

Quarter-finals		Semi-finals		Final
(England) Steve Maish	3
(England) Wes Newton	0	(England) Steve Maish	2
(England) Colin Lloyd	3	(England) Colin Lloyd	3
(England) Tony Eccles	0			(England) Colin Lloyd	3
(England) Mark Walsh	3			(England) Wayne Mardle	2
(United States) Ray Carver	1	(England) Mark Walsh	2
(England) Wayne Mardle	3	(England) Wayne Mardle	3
(England) Denis Ovens	2

Final (England) Colin Lloyd 3–2 Wayne Mardle (England) (0–2, 2–1, 0–2, 2–1, 2–0)

=== Players Championship 22 ===
- Players Championship 22 in Newport, Wales on September 20

Quarter-finals		Semi-finals		Final
(England) Peter Manley	3
(England) Steve Hardy	0	(England) Peter Manley	1
(England) Jamie Caven	3	(England) Jamie Caven	3
(Wales) Barrie Bates	0			(England) Jamie Caven	0
(England) Ronnie Baxter	3			(England) Ronnie Baxter	3
(England) Matt Clark	1	(England) Ronnie Baxter	3
(Republic of Ireland) James Keogh	3	(Republic of Ireland) James Keogh	1
(England) Colin Osborne	1

Final (England) Ronnie Baxter 3–0 Jamie Caven (England) (2–0, 2–0, 2–0)

=== Players Championship 23 ===
- Players Championship 23 in Newport, Wales on September 21

Quarter-finals		Semi-finals		Final
(England) Alan Tabern	3
(Netherlands) Vincent van der Voort	0	(England) Alan Tabern	3
(England) Mervyn King	3	(England) Mervyn King	0
(England) Andy Smith	0			(England) Alan Tabern	3
(Netherlands) Co Stompé	3			(England) Colin Osborne	2
(England) Ronnie Baxter	2	(Netherlands) Co Stompé	0
(England) Colin Osborne	3	(England) Colin Osborne	3
(England) Andy Jenkins	0

Final (England) Alan Tabern 3–2 Colin Osborne (England) (2–0, 1–2, 1–2, 2–0, 2–1)

=== Players Championship 24 ===
- Players Championship 24 in Dublin on 4 October

Quarter-finals		Semi-finals		Final
(England) Phil Taylor	3
(England) Andy Hamilton	1	(England) Phil Taylor	3
(Netherlands) Vincent van der Voort	3	(Netherlands) Vincent van der Voort	0
(England) Dennis Priestley	2			(England) Phil Taylor	3
(England) Colin Osborne	3			(England) James Wade	2
(England) Colin Lloyd	1	(England) Colin Osborne	1
(England) James Wade	3	(England) James Wade	3
(Northern Ireland) John MaGowan	2

Final (England) Phil Taylor 3–2 James Wade (England) (1–2, 2–0, 1–2, 2–0, 2–0)

=== Players Championship 25 ===
- Players Championship 25 in Dublin on 5 October

Quarter-finals		Semi-finals		Final
(England) Mervyn King	3
(England) Adrian Lewis	0	(England) Mervyn King	1
(England) Dennis Priestley	3	(England) Dennis Priestley	3
(Netherlands) Jelle Klaasen	0			(England) Dennis Priestley	3
(Netherlands) Raymond van Barneveld	3			(Netherlands) Raymond van Barneveld	1
(England) Colin Lloyd	0	(Netherlands) Raymond van Barneveld	3
(England) Jamie Caven	3	(England) Jamie Caven	1
(England) Ronnie Baxter	0

Final (England) Dennis Priestley 3–1 Raymond van Barneveld (Netherlands) (2–0, 1–2, 2–1, 2–0)

=== Players Championship 26 ===
- Players Championship 26 in Irvine, North Ayrshire on 18 October

Quarter-finals		Semi-finals		Final
(England) Denis Ovens	3
(England) Wayne Jones	2	(England) Denis Ovens	3
(England) Steve Maish	3	(England) Steve Maish	1
(England) Andy Jenkins	1			(England) Denis Ovens	2
(England) Alex Roy	3			(England) Alex Roy	3
(Netherlands) Vincent van der Voort	1	(England) Alex Roy	3
(England) Terry Jenkins	3	(England) Terry Jenkins	2
(England) Andy Hamilton	1

Final (England) Alex Roy 3–2 Denis Ovens (England) (2–0, 1–2, 0–2, 2–0, 2–1)

=== Players Championship 27 ===
- Players Championship 27 in Irvine, North Ayrshire on 19 October

Quarter-finals		Semi-finals		Final
(England) James Wade	3
(Spain) Carlos Rodriguez	1	(England) James Wade	3
(England) Andy Hamilton	3	(England) Andy Hamilton	1
(England) Mervyn King	0			(England) James Wade	3
(England) Mark Walsh	3			(England) Mark Walsh	1
(England) Denis Ovens	1	(England) Mark Walsh	3
(Scotland) Robert Thornton	3	(Scotland) Robert Thornton	1
(England) Andy Smith	2

Final (England) James Wade 3–1 Mark Walsh (England) (0–2, 2–0, 2–0, 2–1)

=== Players Championship 28 ===
- Players Championship 28 in Kirchheim, Hesse, October 25

Quarter-finals		Semi-finals		Final
(Spain) Carlos Rodriguez	3
(England) Peter Manley	0	(Spain) Carlos Rodriguez	3
(England) Kevin Painter	3	(England) Kevin Painter	0
(England) Mark Walsh	2			(Spain) Carlos Rodriguez	2
(England) Colin Osborne	3			(England) Colin Osborne	3
(Scotland) Robert Thornton	0	(England) Colin Osborne	3
(England) Mark Dudbridge	3	(England) Mark Dudbridge	2
(England) Alan Tabern	2

Final (England) Colin Osborne 3–2 Carlos Rodriguez (Spain) (1–2, 2–1, 2–1, 0–2, 2–1)

=== Players Championship 29 ===
- John McEvoy Gold Darts Classic (Players Championship 29 at the National Event Centre, Killarney on 2 November

Quarter-finals		Semi-finals		Final
(England) Terry Jenkins	3
(Northern Ireland) Felix McBrearty	0	(England) Terry Jenkins	3
(England) Kirk Shepherd	3	(England) Kirk Shepherd	0
(England) Jamie Caven	1			(England) Terry Jenkins	3
(Wales) Barrie Bates	3			(England) Andy Jenkins	0
(England) Matt Clark	1	(England) Andy Jenkins	3
(England) Andy Jenkins	3	(Wales) Barrie Bates	2
(England) Kevin Painter	0

Final (England) Terry Jenkins 3–0 Andy Jenkins (England) (2–0, 2–0, 2–0)

=== Players Championship 30 ===
- Players Championship 30 in Leiden, Netherlands on 8 November

Quarter-finals		Semi-finals		Final
(Netherlands) Raymond van Barneveld	3
(England) Colin Osborne	0	(Netherlands) Raymond van Barneveld	3
(England) Andy Hamilton	3	(England) Andy Hamilton	1
(Netherlands) Michael van Gerwen	2			(Netherlands) Raymond van Barneveld	2
(England) Mervyn King	3			(England) Mervyn King	3
(Scotland) Robert Thornton	1	(England) Mervyn King	3
(England) Colin Lloyd	3	(England) Colin Lloyd	1
(England) Denis Ovens	1

Final (England) Mervyn King 3–2 Raymond van Barneveld (Netherlands) (2–0, 0–2, 2–1, 1–2, 2–0)

=== Players Championship 31 ===
- Dutch Darts Trophy (Players Championship 31) in Leiden, Netherlands on 9 November

Quarter-finals		Semi-finals		Final
(England) Mark Walsh	3
(Netherlands) Remco van Eijden	2	(England) Mark Walsh	3
(England) Peter Manley	3	(England) Peter Manley	2
(Scotland) Robert Thornton	1			(England) Mark Walsh	2
(England) James Wade	3			(England) James Wade	3
(England) Adrian Gray	0	(England) James Wade	3
(England) Denis Ovens	3	(England) Denis Ovens	2
(England) Ronnie Baxter	2

Final (England) James Wade 3–2 Mark Walsh (England) (1–2, 2–1, 0–2, 2–0, 2–1)

== UK Open Regional Finals ==
(Quarter-finals best of 11 legs, Semi-finals best of 13 legs, Finals best of 15 legs)

Three of the eight 2008 UK Open qualifying events took place during 2007.

- Blue Square UK Open Welsh Regional Final on September 23, 2007

Quarter-finals		Semi-finals		Final
(England) James Wade	6
(England) Adrian Lewis	3	(England) James Wade	7
(England) Mervyn King	6	(England) Mervyn King	2
(Canada) John Part	5			(England) James Wade	8
(England) Denis Ovens	6			(Netherlands) Raymond van Barneveld	7
(England) Phil Taylor	4	(England) Denis Ovens	3
(Netherlands) Raymond van Barneveld	6	(Netherlands) Raymond van Barneveld	7
(England) Wayne Jones	4

- Blue Square UK Open Irish Regional Final on October 7, 2007

Quarter-finals		Semi-finals		Final
(England) Chris Thompson	6
(England) Steve Brown	1	(England) Chris Thompson	4
(England) Kevin McDine	6	(England) Kevin McDine	7
(England) Andy Smith	2			(England) Kevin McDine	2
(Netherlands) Raymond van Barneveld	6			(Netherlands) Raymond van Barneveld	8
(England) Adrian Lewis	2	(Netherlands) Raymond van Barneveld	7
(England) Colin Monk	6	(England) Colin Monk	0
(Netherlands) Toon Greebe	4

- Blue Square UK Open Scottish Regional Final on October 21, 2007

Quarter-finals		Semi-finals		Final
(England) Ronnie Baxter	6
(England) Mark Dudbridge	1	(England) Ronnie Baxter	7
(England) Denis Ovens	6	(England) Denis Ovens	6
(England) Lionel Sams	1			(England) Ronnie Baxter	2
(Scotland) Jason Clark	6			(England) James Wade	8
(England) Andy Jenkins	3	(Scotland) Jason Clark	3
(England) James Wade	6	(England) James Wade	7
(Netherlands) Jelle Klaasen	1

- Blue Square UK Open North-East Regional Final at International Stadium, Gateshead on January 13, 2008

Quarter-finals		Semi-finals		Final
(England) Wes Newton	6
(England) Alan Tabern	5	(England) Wes Newton	3
(England) Colin Osborne	6	(England) Colin Osborne	7
(England) John Ferrell	3			(England) Colin Osborne	8
(England) James Wade	6			(England) Denis Ovens	6
(England) Chris Mason	1	(England) James Wade	4
(England) Denis Ovens	6	(England) Denis Ovens	7
(England) Ronnie Baxter	4

- Blue Square UK Open South-West Regional Final at Wellsprings Leisure Centre, Taunton, February 10

Quarter-finals		Semi-finals		Final
(Wales) Wayne Atwood	6
(Netherlands) Roland Scholten	3	(Wales) Wayne Atwood	6
(England) Colin Lloyd	6	(England) Colin Lloyd	7
(England) Kevin McDine	3			(England) Colin Lloyd	8
(England) Adrian Lewis	6			(England) Andy Hamilton	6
(Canada) John Part	2	(England) Adrian Lewis	1
(England) Andy Hamilton	6	(England) Andy Hamilton	7
(England) Mark Walsh	5

- Blue Square UK Open South-West Regional Final at the Brentwood Centre, Essex on March 2

Quarter-finals		Semi-finals		Final
(Netherlands) Jelle Klaasen	6
(Netherlands) Michael van Gerwen	3	(Netherlands) Jelle Klaasen	3
(England) Phil Taylor	6	(England) Phil Taylor	7
(Netherlands) Vincent van der Voort	1			(England) Phil Taylor	6
(England) Colin Lloyd	6			(England) Colin Lloyd	8
(Wales) Barrie Bates	3	(England) Colin Lloyd	7
(England) Wayne Jones	6	(England) Wayne Jones	2
(Netherlands) Jan van der Rassel	3

- Blue Square UK Open North-West Regional Final at the JJB Stadium, Wigan on March 16

Quarter-finals		Semi-finals		Final
(England) Colin Osborne	6
(England) Alex Roy	3	(England) Colin Osborne	0
(England) Phil Taylor	6	(England) Phil Taylor	7
(England) Kevin McDine	3			(England) Phil Taylor	8
(England) Chris Thompson	6			(England) Adrian Lewis	7
(England) Mark Frost	3	(England) Chris Thompson	2
(England) Adrian Lewis	6	(England) Adrian Lewis	7
(England) Colin Lloyd	5

- Blue Square UK Open Midlands Regional Final at the International Centre, Telford on March 30

Quarter-finals		Semi-finals		Final
(England) Phil Taylor	6
(England) Chris Mason	1	(England) Phil Taylor	7
(Netherlands) Raymond van Barneveld	6	(Netherlands) Raymond van Barneveld	4
(England) Colin Monk	2			(England) Phil Taylor	8
(Northern Ireland) Brendan Dolan	6			(Northern Ireland) Brendan Dolan	0
(England) Colin Lloyd	3	(Northern Ireland) Brendan Dolan	7
(England) Colin Osborne	6	(England) Colin Osborne	5
(England) Simon Whatley	1

== German Darts Corporation ==
The German Darts Corporation rankings are calculated from events across Germany, Austria and Switzerland. The top player in the rankings automatically qualifies for the 2009 World Championship.

No.	Date	Also known as	Winner	Legs	Runner-up	Ref.
1	Saturday 23 February	GDC Ramada Hotel Koln 1	Dietmar Burger (Austria)	3–1	(Austria) Mensur Suljović	
2	Sunday 24 February	GDC Ramada Hotel Koln 2	Andree Welge (Germany)	3–2	(Germany) Alexander Köhler	
3	Saturday 10 May	GDC Niedernhausen 1	Michael Rosenauer (Germany)	3–0	(Germany) Frank Mast	
4	Sunday 11 May	GDC Niedernhausen 2	Hannes Schnier (Austria)	3–0	(Germany) Alexander Köhler	
5	Saturday 21 June	GDC Ramada Hotel Koln 3	Michael Rosenauer (Germany)	3–1	(Austria) Mensur Suljović	
6	Sunday 22 June	GDC Ramada Hotel Koln 4	Mensur Suljović (Austria)	3–1	(Germany) Kevin Münch	
7	Saturday 3 October	GDC Ramada Hotel Koln 5	Mensur Suljović (Austria)	3–0	(Germany) Marko Puls	
8	Sunday 4 October	GDC Ramada Hotel Koln 6	Andree Welge (Germany)	3–0	(Austria) Hannes Schnier	

== Australian Grand Prix Pro Tour ==
The Australian Grand Prix rankings are calculated from events across Australia. The top player in the rankings automatically qualifies for the 2009 World Championship.

No.	Date	Also known as	Winner	Legs	Runner-up	Ref.
1	Sunday 3 February	Shoalhavens Viva Las Vegas	Russell Stewart (Australia)	6–1	(Australia) Shane Tichowitsch	
2	Saturday 23 February	DPA Australian Matchplay	Russell Stewart (Australia)	6–1	(Australia) Phil Bottrell	
3	Sunday 24 February	Australia Singles Matchplay	Paul Nicholson (Australia)	beat	(Australia) Rod Neeson	
4	Saturday 15 March	Wagga Classic 1	Paul Nicholson (Australia)	beat	(Australia) Peter Corcoran	
5	Sunday 16 March	Wagga Classic 2	Phil Bottrell (Australia)	6–2	(Australia) Shane Tichowitsch	
6	Saturday 29 March	Gaels Club Open 1	Brian Roach (Australia)	6–2	(Australia) Barry Jouannet Jr	
7	Sunday 30 March	Gaels Club Open 2	Paul Nicholson (Australia)	6–2	(Australia) Phil Bottrell	
8	Saturday 5 April	Young RSL Viva NZ 1	Paul Nicholson (Australia)	6–1	(Australia) Rod Crawford	
9	Sunday 6 April	Young RSL Viva NZ 2	Paul Nicholson (Australia)	6–1	(Australia) Daniel Sim	
10	Saturday 19 April	Goulburn Open 1	Anthony Fleet (Australia)	6–5	(Australia) Phil Bottrell	
11	Sunday 20 April	Goulburn Open 2	Craig Strooisma (Australia)	6–4	(Australia) Wayne Brown	
12	Sunday 11 May	Viva Las Vegas NZ	Paul Nicholson (Australia)	6–1	(New Zealand) Warren French	
13	Saturday 7 June	Oak Flats Soundwaves Open	Peter Corcoran (Australia)	6–5	(Australia) Paul Nicholson	
14	Sunday 8 June	Russell Stewart Classic	Russell Stewart (Australia)	6–0	(Australia) Jerry Weyman	
15	Sunday 22 June	Mittagong RSL Open	Russell Stewart (Australia)	6–3	(Australia) Craig Strooisma	
16	Sunday 20 July	Southern Illawarra Open	Paul Nicholson (Australia)	6–5	(Australia) Brian Roach	
17	Saturday 3 August	Shoalhaven Classic 1	Ronnie Baxter (England)	7–4	(Scotland) Robert Thornton	
18	Sunday 4 August	Shoalhaven Classic 2	Ronnie Baxter (England)	7–3	(South Africa) Charles Losper	
19	Saturday 10 August	William Cross Pro Am	James Wade (England)	7–4	(England) Ronnie Baxter	
20	Sunday 11 August	Australian Open Players Championship	Robert Thornton (Scotland)	3–1	(Australia) Paul Nicholson	
21	Saturday 6 September	Mildura Workers Club Open 1	Paul Nicholson (Australia)	beat	(Australia) Phil Bottrell	
22	Sunday 7 September	Mildura Workers Club Open 2	Paul Nicholson (Australia)	beat	(Australia) Steve Duke Jr	
23	Sunday 14 September	Broken Hill Legion Club Championship	Andrew Townes (Australia)	beat	(Australia) Paul Nicholson	
24	Sunday 26 October	Oceanic Masters	Russell Stewart (Australia)	8–4	(Australia) Brian Roach	
25	Saturday 29 November	DPA Australian Singles	Shane Tichowitsch (Australia)	beat	(Australia) Wayne Brown	
26	Sunday 30 November	Bridge Trophies and Partyware Open	Arnel Galvez (Australia)	7–1	(Australia) Wayne Brown	
27	Saturday 6 December	Oceanic Classic	Russell Stewart (Australia)	7–5	(New Zealand) Barry Whittaker	
28	Tuesday 16 December	DPA Oceanic National Championship	Peter Sutton (Australia)	8–7	(Australia) Brad Austen	
29	Wednesday 17 December	DPA Sydney Open	Glen Power (Australia)	10–5	(Australia) Henry Bajowski	
30	Thursday 18 December	DPA Melbourne Classic	Mick Zdun (Australia)	8–7	(Australia) Alan Aird	
31	Friday 19 December	DPA Australian Matchplay	Alan Aird (Australia)	6–5	(Australia) Bill Aitken	

== Other PDC tournaments ==
The PDC also held a number of other tournaments during 2008. These were mainly smaller events with low prize money, and some had eligibility restrictions. All of these tournaments were non-ranking.

Date	Event	Winner	Score	Runner-Up
April 16	London Masters	(England) Phil Taylor	7–4	(England) James Wade
May 17	North American Darts Championship	(United States) Darin Young	8–7	(United States) Brad Wethington
June 10	PDC New Zealand Qualifying Event	(New Zealand) Warren French	beat	(New Zealand) Phillip Hazel
August 31	Irish Matchplay	(Republic of Ireland) Shane O'Connor	7–2	(Republic of Ireland) Garrett Gray
September 27	Emperors Palace South African Open	(South Africa) Charles Losper	4–1	(South Africa) Mark Jackson
September 28	Emperors Palace South African Masters	(England) Phil Taylor	5–2	(Canada) John Part
September 28	PDC World Finland Qualifying Event	(Finland) Marko Kantele	beat	(Finland) Asko Niskala
October 25	PDC Australian Open	(Australia) Paul Nicholson	11–10	(Australia) Simon Whitlock
October 26	Oceanic Masters	(Australia) Russell Stewart	8–4	(Australia) Brian Roach
October 31	PDC World East European Qualifying Event	(Hungary) Nandor Bezzeg	7–5	(Slovenia) Gregor Gorjup
November 1	Gleneagle Irish Masters	(Netherlands) Michael van Gerwen	6–5	(England) Kevin McDine
November 16	Caribbean and South American Masters	(Guyana) Sudesh Fitzgerald	4–1	(Barbados) Mark Cummins
December 12	New Kids On The Oche	(England) Arron Monk	3–0	(England) Joe Cullen
