= 2018 Gibraltar Darts Trophy =

Tournament information
- Dates: 8–10 June 2018
- Venue: Victoria Stadium
- Location: Gibraltar
- Country: Gibraltar
- Organisation(s): PDC
- Format: Legs
- Prize fund: £135,000
- Winner's share: £25,000
- High checkout: 170 (Wales) Gerwyn Price (third round)

Champion(s)
- (Netherlands) Michael van Gerwen

The 2018 Gibraltar Darts Trophy was the seventh of thirteen PDC European Tour events on the 2018 PDC Pro Tour. The tournament took place at Victoria Stadium, Gibraltar from 8–10 June 2018. It featured a field of 48 players and £135,000 in prize money, with £25,000 going to the winner.

Michael Smith was the defending champion after defeating Mensur Suljović 6–4 in the 2017 final, but he lost 6–5 to Jermaine Wattimena in the second round.

Michael van Gerwen won the title for a third time by defeating Adrian Lewis 8–3 in the final.

== Prize money ==
This is how the prize money is divided:

| Stage (num. of players) | | Prize money |
|---|---|---|
| Winner | (1) | £25,000 |
| Runner-up | (1) | £10,000 |
| Semi-finalists | (2) | £6,000 |
| Quarter-finalists | (4) | £4,000 |
| Third round losers | (8) | £3,000 |
| Second round losers | (16) | £2,000 |
| First round losers | (16) | £1,000 |
| Total | £135,000 | |

Prize money will count towards the PDC Order of Merit, the ProTour Order of Merit and the European Tour Order of Merit, with one exception: should a seeded player lose in the second round (last 32), their prize money will not count towards any Orders of Merit, although they still receive the full prize money payment.

== Qualification and format ==
The top 16 entrants from the PDC ProTour Order of Merit on 11 May will automatically qualify for the event and will be seeded in the second round.

The remaining 32 places will go to players from five qualifying events – 18 from the UK Qualifier (held in Milton Keynes on 18 May), eight from the West/South European Qualifier (held on 30 May), four from the Host Nation Qualifier (held on 7 June), one from the Nordic & Baltic Qualifier (held on 25 May) and one from the East European Qualifier (held on 24 February).

The following players will take part in the tournament:

Top 16
1. (Netherlands) Michael van Gerwen (champion)
2. (England) Michael Smith (second round)
3. (Scotland) Peter Wright (quarter-finals)
4. (England) Rob Cross (quarter-finals)
5. (Northern Ireland) Daryl Gurney (third round)
6. (Austria) Mensur Suljović (second round)
7. (England) Joe Cullen (third round)
8. (Wales) Jonny Clayton (quarter-finals)
9. (England) Ian White (second round)
10. (England) Dave Chisnall (second round)
11. (England) James Wade (third round)
12. (England) Darren Webster (second round)
13. (Australia) Simon Whitlock (third round)
14. (England) Mervyn King (second round)
15. (Wales) Gerwyn Price (quarter-finals)
16. (England) Stephen Bunting (second round)

UK Qualifier
- (Wales) Richie Burnett (first round)
- (England) Andy Boulton (third round)
- (England) James Wilson (first round)
- (England) Adrian Lewis (runner-up)
- (England) Michael Barnard (second round)
- (Wales) Barrie Bates (first round)
- (England) Adam Huckvale (second round)
- (England) Mark Dudbridge (first round)
- (England) Steve West (semi-finals)
- (Wales) Jamie Lewis (first round)
- (England) Chris Dobey (third round)
- (Scotland) Robert Thornton (first round)
- (England) Ross Smith (second round)
- (Republic of Ireland) Steve Lennon (first round)
- (England) Matt Padgett (first round)
- (Northern Ireland) Brendan Dolan (second round)
- (Australia) Paul Nicholson (semi-finals)
- (England) Ritchie Edhouse (first round)

West/South European Qualifier
- (Netherlands) Jermaine Wattimena (third round)
- (Netherlands) Jeffrey de Graaf (first round)
- (Spain) Toni Alcinas (first round)
- (Germany) Max Hopp (third round)
- (Spain) Cristo Reyes (second round)
- (Netherlands) Vincent van der Voort (second round)
- (Belgium) Mike De Decker (second round)
- (Austria) Hannes Schnier (second round)

Host Nation Qualifier
- (Gibraltar) Antony Lopez (first round)
- (Gibraltar) Clayton Otton (first round)
- (Gibraltar) Roy Asquez (first round)
- (Gibraltar) Tony Dawkins (first round)

Nordic & Baltic Qualifier
- (Lithuania) Darius Labanauskas (second round)

East European Qualifier
- (Poland) Krzysztof Ratajski (first round)

== Draw ==
First round (best of 11 legs); 8 June
(Netherlands) Vincent van der Voort 96.02 | 6
(Wales) Barrie Bates 86.53 | 3
(England) Ritchie Edhouse 97.43 | 5
(England) Andy Boulton 98.94 | 6
(Austria) Hannes Schnier 77.51 | 6
(Gibraltar) Roy Asquez 69.28 | 2
(Germany) Max Hopp 100.20 | 6
(England) Mark Dudbridge 87.71 | 0
(England) James Wilson 88.97 | 4
(Northern Ireland) Brendan Dolan 88.22 | 6
(England) Steve West 93.34 | 6
(Spain) Toni Alcinas 89.53 | 3
(Scotland) Robert Thornton 90.89 | 5
(Spain) Cristo Reyes 87.07 | 6
(Wales) Richie Burnett 87.64 | 3
(England) Adam Huckvale 94.34 | 6
(Netherlands) Jermaine Wattimena 85.00 | 6
(Gibraltar) Tony Dawkins 71.31 | 1
(England) Matt Padgett 91.59 | 5
(Belgium) Mike De Decker 95.45 | 6
(Netherlands) Jeffrey de Graaf 95.71 | 4
(Lithuania) Darius Labanauskas 95.94 | 6
(Australia) Paul Nicholson 85.08 | 6
(Gibraltar) Antony Lopez 67.79 | 0
(England) Adrian Lewis 85.89 | 6
(Gibraltar) Clayton Otton 67.18 | 0
(Wales) Jamie Lewis 97.01 | 3
(England) Ross Smith 91.99 | 6
(Poland) Krzysztof Ratajski 87.99 | 3
(England) Michael Barnard 95.83 | 6
(England) Chris Dobey 97.03 | 6
(Republic of Ireland) Steve Lennon 91.76 | 2

Second round (best of 11 legs); 9 June
1 | (Netherlands) Michael van Gerwen 107.86 | 6
(Netherlands) Vincent van der Voort 102.43 | 4
16 | (England) Stephen Bunting 91.72 | 4
(England) Andy Boulton 91.61 | 6
8 | (Wales) Jonny Clayton 93.94 | 6
(Austria) Hannes Schnier 80.06 | 0
9 | (England) Ian White 87.94 | 4
(Germany) Max Hopp 94.11 | 6
5 | (Northern Ireland) Daryl Gurney 94.66 | 6
(Northern Ireland) Brendan Dolan 93.71 | 4
12 | (England) Darren Webster 90.25 | 5
(England) Steve West 96.61 | 6
4 | (England) Rob Cross 97.66 | 6
(Spain) Cristo Reyes 91.26 | 5
13 | (Australia) Simon Whitlock 91.76 | 6
(England) Adam Huckvale 78.00 | 1
2 | (England) Michael Smith 95.30 | 5
(Netherlands) Jermaine Wattimena 93.60 | 6
15 | (Wales) Gerwyn Price 91.45 | 6
(Belgium) Mike De Decker 86.11 | 2
7 | (England) Joe Cullen 107.97 | 6
(Lithuania) Darius Labanauskas 95.97 | 1
10 | (England) Dave Chisnall 89.27 | 4
(Australia) Paul Nicholson 94.24 | 6
6 | (Austria) Mensur Suljović 98.95 | 3
(England) Adrian Lewis 95.63 | 6
11 | (England) James Wade 85.61 | 6
(England) Ross Smith 88.67 | 5
3 | (Scotland) Peter Wright 100.61 | 6
(England) Michael Barnard 84.43 | 2
14 | (England) Mervyn King 84.45 | 3
(England) Chris Dobey 84.85 | 6

Third round (best of 11 legs); 10 June
1 | (Netherlands) van Gerwen 103.26 | 6
(England) Boulton 89.53 | 2
8 | (Wales) Clayton 96.59 | 6
(Germany) Hopp 87.64 | 2
5 | (Northern Ireland) Gurney 89.94 | 1
(England) West 93.81 | 6
4 | (England) Cross 101.02 | 6
13 | (Australia) Whitlock 84.45 | 2
(Netherlands) Wattimena 94.72 | 3
15 | (Wales) Price 97.82 | 6
7 | (England) Cullen 95.96 | 5
(Australia) Nicholson 92.85 | 6
(England) A. Lewis 105.97 | 6
11 | (England) Wade 105.60 | 5
3 | (Scotland) Wright 108.82 | 6
(England) Dobey 94.90 | 1

Quarter-finals (best of 11 legs); 10 June
1 | (Netherlands) van Gerwen 97.39 | 6
8 | (Wales) Clayton 86.12 | 2
(England) West 89.74 | 6
4 | (England) Cross 99.87 | 5
15 | (Wales) Price 92.72 | 5
(Australia) Nicholson 87.95 | 6
(England) A. Lewis 95.11 | 6
3 | (Scotland) Wright 92.48 | 3

Semi-finals (best of 13 legs); 10 June
1 | (Netherlands) van Gerwen 105.20 | 7
(England) West 92.14 | 4
(Australia) Nicholson 98.82 | 6
(England) A. Lewis 98.29 | 7

Final (best of 15 legs); 10 June
1 | (Netherlands) van Gerwen 108.13 | 8
(England) A. Lewis 96.69 | 3
