= Nagakawa =

Nagakawa (written: 永川 lit. "long river") is a Japanese surname. Notable people with the surname include:

- Akihiro Nagakawa (永川 明広, born 1972), Japanese darts player
- Katsuhiro Nagakawa (永川 勝浩, born 1980), Japanese baseball player
- Reiji Nagakawa (永川 玲二, 1928–2000), Japanese translator and writer
