= Shi Yongsheng =

Chinese darts player (born 1970)

Personal information
- Born: 2 September 1970 (age 56) Xinyang, China
- Home town: Henan, China

Sport
- Sport: Darts
- Playing since: 1990
- Darts: 21 Gram Harrows Signature
- Laterality: Right-handed
- Walk-on music: "Firestarter" by The Prodigy

Organisation (see split in darts)
- PDC: 2004–2012

PDC premier events – best performances
- World Championship: Last 64: 2007, 2008, 2009

Other tournament wins
- Tournament: Years
- PDC Chinese Qualifying Event Hong Kong Open: 2007, 2008; 2008
- Updated on 12 May 2021

Shi Yongsheng (born 2 September 1970) is a Chinese former professional darts player who competed in Professional Darts Corporation (PDC) tournaments.

== Career ==
In 2004, he lost to Phil Taylor of England 0–3 whitewashed on the 2004 PDC China Telcom Cup.

He played in the 2007 PDC World Darts Championship, losing in the first round to Andy Smith. In November 2007, Shi won the Chinese qualifiers to return to the World Championship for 2008, thus becoming the first Chinese player to play in two World Championships. He defeated India's Ashfaque Sayed in the preliminary round, but lost in the first round to Alan Warriner-Little. He returned to the world championship in 2009 but was beaten in the first round again. He defeated Austrian Hannes Schnier six legs to four in the preliminary round but lost three sets to nil against Mervyn King in the first round.

Shi won the 2009 PDC Chinese Qualifying Event, which would have seen him play a fourth successive World Championship. However, he was forced to withdraw from the competition due to visa issues and was replaced by Jan van der Rassel.

== World Championship results ==
=== PDC ===
- 2007: 1st Round (lost to Andy Smith 0–3) (sets)
- 2008: 1st Round (lost to Alan Warriner-Little 1–3)
- 2009: 1st Round (lost to Mervyn King 0–3)
