= 2008 PDC World Darts Championship =

Tournament information
- Dates: 17 December 2007 – 1 January 2008
- Venue: Alexandra Palace
- Location: London
- Country: England
- Organisation(s): PDC
- Format: Legs (preliminaries); Sets (from Round 1); Final – best of 13
- Prize fund: £589,000
- Winner's share: £100,000
- High checkout: 170; Mervyn King; Wayne Mardle; James Wade

Champion(s)
- John Part

The 2008 PDC World Darts Championship (known for sponsorship reasons as the 2008 Ladbrokes.com World Darts Championship) was the fifteenth World Championship organised by the Professional Darts Corporation since it separated from the British Darts Organisation. The event took place between 17 December 2007 and 1 January 2008 at the Alexandra Palace, London, England.

John Part won his third World Championship, beating the qualifier Kirk Shepherd 7–2 in the final. He joined Phil Taylor, Raymond van Barneveld, Eric Bristow, and John Lowe as the only people to have won more than two world titles, although they have since been joined by Martin Adams, Michael van Gerwen and Glen Durrant. He is also one of seven players to have won the PDC World Darts Championship more than once, along with Phil Taylor, Adrian Lewis, Gary Anderson, Michael van Gerwen, Peter Wright and Luke Littler. In addition, he became the first player to have won World Championships in three different venues; the Lakeside, the Circus Tavern and the Alexandra Palace.

Raymond van Barneveld was the defending champion having won the PDC World Championship at the first attempt in an epic final against Taylor in 2007. He was knocked out in the third round with a 4–2 loss to Kevin Painter.

Taylor failed to reach the final of the competition for the first time in PDC World Championship history, after losing 5–4 to Wayne Mardle in the quarter-finals.

In addition to several highly ranked players failing to reach the latter stages of the competition, an argument could be made that this tournament had, statistically, the lowest standard of play from any PDC World Championship this millennium. A distinct lack of quality was exhibited across the draw: no single player achieved a 3-dart average of over 100 in any match in the entire tournament, the highest being John Part's average of 99.06 in his second-round match against Mensur Suljovic; additionally, there were only six 3-dart averages of 96 or higher in any match in the entire tournament (see Draw below). Kirk Shepherd, meanwhile, incredibly finished runner-up in the tournament without averaging over 90 in any match he played in the tournament - he is the only player to achieve this feat in any PDC World Championship event this millennium. Shepherd was also the first player making his PDC World Championship debut to reach the final, without having played in a BDO World Championship.

After being staged at the Circus Tavern in Purfleet for 14 years, the tournament moved to the Alexandra Palace in London. The championships had been considered to have outgrown the Circus Tavern whose capacity of 800–1,000 spectators was considerably smaller than some Holsten Premier League darts events in 2007 which saw crowds reaching 5,000. The Alexandra Palace was the venue of the News of the World Darts Championship between 1963 and 1977 and boasts a capacity for 2008 of 2,500.

== Format and qualifiers ==
The televised stages featured 68 players. The top 32 players in the PDC Order of Merit on 12 November 2007 received an automatic place in the World Championship. They were joined by 16 PDPA members and 20 international qualifiers determined by the PDC and PDPA.

The 16 PDPA members were made up from the top eight players (who had not already qualified) in the PDC Pro Tour Events during 2007: Jelle Klaasen, Mark Walsh, Tony Eccles, Michael van Gerwen, Steve Brown, Dave Askew, Jason Clark and Matt Clark.

The final eight qualifiers were determined at a PDPA Qualifying event which was held on 17 November 2007 in Wolverhampton – prior to the Grand Slam of Darts tournament. The successful players were Steve Maish, Jan van der Rassel, Colin Monk, Steve Evans, Jamie Caven, Steve Hine, Kirk Shepherd and Jason Barry. Former world champions John Lowe, Eric Bristow, Keith Deller and Richie Burnett all played in the qualifying rounds but failed to reach the televised stages.

Order of Merit

1. (England) Phil Taylor
2. (Netherlands) Raymond van Barneveld
3. (England) James Wade
4. (England) Terry Jenkins
5. (England) Peter Manley
6. (England) Adrian Lewis
7. (England) Andy Hamilton
8. (Netherlands) Roland Scholten
9. (England) Wayne Mardle
10. (England) Dennis Priestley
11. (Canada) John Part
12. (England) Colin Lloyd
13. (Wales) Barrie Bates
14. (England) Ronnie Baxter
15. (England) Kevin Painter
16. (England) Andy Jenkins
17. (England) Alan Tabern
18. (England) Mark Dudbridge
19. (England) Chris Mason
20. (England) Colin Osborne
21. (England) Denis Ovens
22. (England) Andy Smith
23. (England) Wayne Jones
24. (England) Wes Newton
25. (England) Mervyn King
26. (Netherlands) Vincent van der Voort
27. (England) Alex Roy
28. (England) Alan Warriner-Little
29. (Republic of Ireland) Mick McGowan
30. (England) Steve Beaton
31. (England) Bob Anderson
32. (England) Adrian Gray

Pro Tour

1. (Netherlands) Jelle Klaasen
2. (England) Mark Walsh
3. (Netherlands) Michael van Gerwen
4. (England) Steve Brown
5. (England) Matt Clark
6. (England) Tony Eccles
7. (England) Dave Askew
8. (Scotland) Jason Clark

PDPA qualifiers

1. (England) Jamie Caven
2. (England) Kirk Shepherd
3. (England) Steve Hine
4. (England) Steve Maish
5. (Republic of Ireland) Jason Barry
6. (Wales) Steve Evans
7. (Netherlands) Jan van der Rassel
8. (England) Colin Monk

PDC North American Pro Tour
Order of Merit
First round qualifiers

- (United States) Gary Mawson
- (United States) Ray Carver
- (Canada) Gerry Convery
- (Canada) Dan Olson

Dutch/Belgian DDF
Order of Merit
First round qualifiers

- (Netherlands) Leroy Kwadijk
- (Netherlands) Toon Greebe

German Darts Corporation
Order of Merit
First round qualifiers

- (Austria) Mensur Suljović
- (Germany) Michael Rosenauer

Danish Order of Merit
First round qualifiers

- (Denmark) Per Laursen

Australia Order of Merit
First round qualifiers

- (Australia) Steve MacArthur

Oceanic Masters winner
First round qualifiers

- (New Zealand) Warren Parry

South African Open winner
First round qualifiers

- (South Africa) Charles Losper

International qualifiers
Preliminary round qualifiers

- (Japan) Akihiro Nagakawa
- (Barbados) Anthony Forde
- (Philippines) Rizal Barellano
- (Czech Republic) Miloslav Navrátil
- (New Zealand) Alan Bolton
- (Netherlands) Erwin Extercatte
- (India) Ashfaque Sayed
- (China) Shi Yongsheng

== Prize money ==
The 2008 World Championship featured a prize fund of £589,000. The prize money for earlier round losers was increased, whilst the winner and runner-up prize money was unchanged.

Position (num. of players)		Prize money (Total: £589,000)
Winner	(1)	£100,000
Runner-Up	(1)	£50,000
Semi-finalists	(2)	£22,500
Quarter-finalists	(4)	£15,000
Third round losers	(8)	£10,500
Second round losers	(16)	£7,000
First round losers	(32)	£4,000
Preliminary round losers	(4)	£2,500
Nine-dart finish	(0)	£20,000

== Draw ==
=== Preliminary round ===
(best of nine legs, played Wednesday 19 December and Thursday 20 December)

Av.	Player	Score	Player	Av.
68.85	Akihiro Nagakawa (Japan)	2 – 5	(Barbados) Anthony Forde	69.83
68.58	Rizal Barellano (Philippines)	0 – 5	(Czech Republic) Miloslav Navrátil	74.96
60.38	Alan Bolton (New Zealand)	0 – 5	(Netherlands) Erwin Extercatte	63.15
72.03	Ashfaque Sayed (India)	0 – 5	(China) Shi Yongsheng	78.28

=== Draw ===
==== Finals ====
Quarter-finals (best of 9 sets); 29 December
1	(England) Phil Taylor 92.32	4
9	(England) Wayne Mardle 92.20	5
5	(England) Peter Manley 94.27	4
(England) Kirk Shepherd 89.70	5
15	(England) Kevin Painter 87.51	5
7	(England) Adrian Lewis 86.26	2
11	(Canada) John Part 94.81	5
3	(England) James Wade 91.48	4

Semi-finals (best of 11 sets); 30 December
9	(England) Wayne Mardle 92.36	4
(England) Kirk Shepherd 88.77	6
15	(England) Kevin Painter 91.94	2
11	(Canada) John Part 92.84	6

Final (best of 13 sets); 1 January
(England) Kirk Shepherd 85.10	2
11	(Canada) John Part 92.86	7

==== Rounds 1-4 ====
First round (best of 5 sets); 17–22 December
1	(England) Phil Taylor 91.11	3
(Netherlands) Michael van Gerwen 85.99	2
32	(England) Adrian Gray 88.01	2
(England) Mark Walsh 87.63	3
16	(England) Andy Jenkins 86.80	3
(Czech Republic) Miloslav Navrátil 83.12	2
17	(England) Alan Tabern 87.96	3
(Denmark) Per Laursen 84.17	1
8	(Netherlands) Roland Scholten 94.25	3
(England) Matt Clark 93.88	2
25	(England) Mervyn King 95.97	3
(Germany) Michael Rosenauer 86.60	2
9	(England) Wayne Mardle 91.13	3
(United States) Ray Carver 90.30	2
24	(England) Wes Newton 87.15	0
(England) Jamie Caven 89.36	3
5	(England) Peter Manley 90.09	3
(Netherlands) Toon Greebe 89.60	2
28	(England) Alan Warriner-Little 80.98	3
(China) Shi Yongsheng 76.38	1
12	(England) Colin Lloyd 85.75	2
(Netherlands) Jan van der Rassel 90.66	3
21	(England) Denis Ovens 85.08	3
(England) Colin Monk 69.48	0
4	(England) Terry Jenkins 83.62	2
(England) Kirk Shepherd 79.09	3
29	(Republic of Ireland) Mick McGowan 86.66	3
(Republic of Ireland) Jason Barry 87.75	0
13	(Wales) Barrie Bates 82.99	3
(Canada) Gerry Convery 79.50	0
20	(England) Colin Osborne 90.33	1
(Netherlands) Erwin Extercatte 92.58	3
2	(Netherlands) Raymond van Barneveld 89.12	3
(Barbados) Anthony Forde 81.84	0
31	(England) Bob Anderson 91.07	2
(Scotland) Jason Clark 89.70	3
15	(England) Kevin Painter 96.45	3
(United States) Gary Mawson 83.86	0
18	(England) Chris Mason 84.72	3
(England) Steve Brown 77.61	1
7	(England) Adrian Lewis 96.79	3
(England) Dave Askew 90.46	1
26	(Netherlands) Vincent van der Voort 86.94	3
(Netherlands) Jelle Klaasen 90.27	2
10	(England) Dennis Priestley 92.06	1
(England) Steve Maish 92.59	3
23	(England) Wayne Jones 83.71	0
(England) Tony Eccles 91.17	3
6	(England) Andy Hamilton 90.20	3
(Netherlands) Leroy Kwadijk 74.17	1
27	(England) Alex Roy 86.41	3
(New Zealand) Warren Parry 83.56	2
11	(Canada) John Part 94.08	3
(South Africa) Charles Losper 85.21	1
22	(England) Andy Smith 81.11	2
(Austria) Mensur Suljović 83.26	3
3	(England) James Wade 89.82	3
(Australia) Steve MacArthur 75.66	0
30	(England) Steve Beaton 76.99	3
(Wales) Steve Evans 75.56	0
14	(England) Ronnie Baxter 90.31	3
(Canada) Dan Olson 85.17	2
19	(England) Mark Dudbridge 85.46	3
(England) Steve Hine 83.07	1

Second round (best of 7 sets); 22–27 December
1	(England) Taylor 94.52	4
(England) Walsh 89.52	3
16	(England) A. Jenkins 80.04	0
17	(England) Tabern 86.04	4
8	(Netherlands) Scholten 93.10	4
25	(England) King 90.31	2
9	(England) Mardle 89.61	4
(England) Caven 82.35	1
5	(England) Manley 88.96	4
28	(England) Warriner-Little 82.55	1
(Netherlands) van der Rassel 90.99	4
21	(England) Ovens 90.22	1
(England) Shepherd 87.18	4
29	(Republic of Ireland) McGowan 85.09	3
13	(Wales) Bates 82.36	4
(Netherlands) Extercatte 84.00	3
2	(Netherlands) van Barneveld 92.31	4
(Scotland) Clark 87.96	1
15	(England) Painter 92.04	4
18	(England) Mason 83.91	0
7	(England) Lewis 91.81	4
26	(Netherlands) van der Voort 96.46	2
(England) Maish 87.29	3
(England) Eccles 91.08	4
6	(England) Hamilton 90.97	1
27	(England) Roy 91.33	4
11	(Canada) Part 99.06	4
(Austria) Suljović 91.26	1
3	(England) Wade 90.92	4
30	(England) Beaton 87.80	3
14	(England) Baxter 91.82	2
19	(England) Dudbridge 87.92	4

Third round (best of 7 sets); 27–28 December
1	(England) Taylor 96.71	4
17	(England) Tabern 93.42	3
8	(Netherlands) Scholten 91.86	3
9	(England) Mardle 89.28	4
5	(England) Manley 87.75	4
(Netherlands) van der Rassel 86.76	1
(England) Shepherd 85.86	4
13	(Wales) Bates 85.61	2
2	(Netherlands) van Barneveld 90.75	2
15	(England) Painter 95.20	4
7	(England) Lewis 94.19	4
(England) Eccles 97.20	3
27	(England) Roy 85.16	0
11	(Canada) Part 91.32	4
3	(England) Wade 84.54	4
19	(England) Dudbridge 84.96	2

Quarter-finals (best of 9 sets); 29 December
1	(England) Taylor 92.32	4
9	(England) Mardle 92.20	5
5	(England) Manley 94.27	4
(England) Shepherd 89.70	5
15	(England) Painter 87.51	5
7	(England) Lewis 86.26	2
11	(Canada) Part 94.81	5
3	(England) Wade 91.48	4

Scores after player's names are three-dart averages (total points scored divided by darts thrown and multiplied by 3)

== Statistics ==
=== Overall ===
- Highest Checkout: 170 ( (England) Mervyn King, (England) James Wade, (England) Wayne Mardle)
- Total 180's scored: 478
- Highest Match Average: 99.06 ( (Canada) John Part, second round vs (Austria) Mensur Suljović)

=== Individual statistics ===
Player	Played	Sets Won	Sets Lost	Legs Won	Legs Lost	100+	140+	180s	High checkout	3-dart average
(Canada) John Part	6	29	10	98	68	202	112	34	160	94.42
(England) Kirk Shepherd	6	24	23	104	101	237	120	33	160	83.92
(England) Phil Taylor	4	15	13	66	59	162	70	19	137	93.67
(Netherlands) Michael van Gerwen	1	2	3	11	13	29	15	1	106	85.99
(England) Adrian Gray	1	2	3	10	12	28	18	3	104	88.01
(England) Mark Walsh	2	6	6	23	24	52	38	10	156	88.58
(England) Andy Jenkins	2	3	6	14	19	31	15	9	142	83.42
(Philippines) Rizal Barellano	1	0	0	0	5	4	3	0	–	68.58
(Czech Republic) Miloslav Navrátil	2	2	3	12	11	14	8	6	81	79.04
(England) Alan Tabern	3	10	5	39	30	98	55	9	160	89.14
(Denmark) Per Laursen	1	1	3	8	10	30	10	2	68	84.17
(Netherlands) Roland Scholten	3	10	8	36	40	103	56	19	140	93.07
(England) Matt Clark	1	2	3	12	10	25	19	4	100	93.88
(England) Mervyn King	2	5	6	26	24	57	47	10	170	93.14
(Germany) Michael Rosenauer	1	2	3	11	13	29	18	3	116	86.60
(England) Wayne Mardle	5	20	16	81	70	183	135	24	170	90.92
(United States) Ray Carver	1	2	3	8	11	26	7	7	110	90.30
(England) Wes Newton	1	0	3	4	9	14	11	2	81	87.15
(England) Jamie Caven	2	4	4	15	17	39	16	3	121	85.86
(England) Peter Manley	4	15	9	57	49	167	80	14	156	90.27
(Netherlands) Toon Greebe	1	2	3	9	12	22	17	4	94	89.60
(England) Alan Warriner-Little	2	4	5	19	18	46	22	4	108	86.77
(India) Ashfaque Sayed	1	0	0	0	5	4	2	0	–	72.03
(China) Shi Yongsheng	2	1	3	10	11	23	13	0	119	77.33
(England) Colin Lloyd	1	2	3	14	14	29	13	1	120	85.75
(Netherlands) Jan van der Rassel	3	8	7	37	37	103	51	10	116	89.47
(England) Denis Ovens	2	4	4	18	14	46	20	6	100	87.65
(England) Colin Monk	1	0	3	0	9	4	4	0	–	69.48
(England) Terry Jenkins	1	2	3	10	10	32	13	1	56	83.62
(Republic of Ireland) Mick McGowan	2	6	4	25	24	66	35	6	120	85.88
(Republic of Ireland) Jason Barry	1	0	3	5	9	13	13	1	64	87.75
(Wales) Barrie Bates	3	9	7	36	28	101	34	6	120	83.66
(Canada) Gerry Convery	1	0	3	1	9	10	4	2	82	79.50
(England) Colin Osborne	1	1	3	8	9	14	6	10	144	90.33
(New Zealand) Alan Bolton	1	0	0	0	5	3	0	0	–	60.38
(Netherlands) Erwin Extercatte	3	6	5	27	24	61	18	5	147	79.91
(Netherlands) Raymond van Barneveld	3	9	5	34	25	73	36	13	120	90.73
(Japan) Akihiro Nagakawa	1	0	0	2	5	9	1	1	40	68.85
(Barbados) Anthony Forde	2	0	3	9	11	28	11	2	120	75.84
(England) Bob Anderson	1	2	3	10	11	30	16	4	141	91.07
(Scotland) Jason Clark	2	4	6	19	24	53	32	9	104	88.83
(England) Kevin Painter	5	18	10	69	45	159	77	24	137	92.23
(United States) Gary Mawson	1	0	3	2	9	14	4	2	96	83.86
(England) Chris Mason	2	3	5	16	15	39	15	2	136	84.32
(England) Steve Brown	1	1	3	3	11	20	7	0	67	77.61
(England) Adrian Lewis	4	13	11	46	50	118	55	22	136	92.26
(England) Dave Askew	1	1	3	8	10	25	11	3	62	90.46
(Netherlands) Vincent van der Voort	2	5	6	27	28	71	32	19	124	91.70
(Netherlands) Jelle Klaasen	1	2	3	15	15	36	19	6	104	90.27
(England) Dennis Priestley	1	1	3	7	9	28	7	3	130	92.06
(England) Steve Maish	2	6	5	25	24	68	17	7	110	89.94
(England) Wayne Jones	1	0	3	3	9	22	7	0	42	83.71
(England) Tony Eccles	3	10	7	41	33	96	55	10	156	93.15
(England) Andy Hamilton	2	4	5	19	17	35	20	16	144	90.59
(Netherlands) Leroy Kwadijk	1	1	3	3	11	10	6	0	160	74.17
(England) Alex Roy	3	7	7	35	30	108	41	5	124	87.63
(New Zealand) Warren Parry	1	2	3	11	16	41	13	1	91	83.56
(South Africa) Charles Losper	1	1	3	8	11	18	9	4	94	85.21
(England) Andy Smith	1	2	3	11	12	34	16	2	88	81.11
(Austria) Mensur Suljović	2	4	6	17	23	38	15	11	111	87.26
(England) James Wade	4	15	6	59	46	134	72	17	170	89.19
(Australia) Steve MacArthur	1	0	3	1	9	15	5	0	16	75.66
(England) Steve Beaton	2	6	4	23	18	52	23	7	98	82.40
(Wales) Steve Evans	1	0	3	1	9	13	9	1	20	75.56
(England) Ronnie Baxter	2	5	6	23	25	71	25	9	137	91.07
(Canada) Dan Olson	1	2	3	9	13	23	12	6	120	85.17
(England) Mark Dudbridge	3	9	7	38	30	71	38	12	113	86.11
(England) Steve Hine	1	1	3	5	11	17	8	2	100	83.07

== Representation from different countries ==
This table shows the number of players by country in the World Championship, the total number including the preliminary round.

	(England) ENG	(Netherlands) NED	(Scotland) SCO	(Wales) WAL	(Republic of Ireland) IRL	(Canada) CAN	(Germany) GER	(Austria) AUT	(New Zealand) NZL	(Australia) AUS	(United States) USA	(South Africa) RSA	(Denmark) DEN	(China) CHN	(Barbados) BAR	(Czech Republic) CZE	(Japan) JPN	(Philippines) PHI	(India) IND	Total
Final	1	0	0	0	0	1	0	0	0	0	0	0	0	0	0	0	0	0	0	2
Semis	3	0	0	0	0	1	0	0	0	0	0	0	0	0	0	0	0	0	0	4
Quarters	7	0	0	0	0	1	0	0	0	0	0	0	0	0	0	0	0	0	0	8
Round 3	11	3	0	1	0	1	0	0	0	0	0	0	0	0	0	0	0	0	0	16
Round 2	22	5	1	1	1	1	0	1	0	0	0	0	0	0	0	0	0	0	0	32
Round 1	36	9	1	2	2	3	1	1	1	1	2	1	1	1	1	1	0	0	0	64
Prelim.	0	1	0	0	0	0	0	0	1	0	0	0	0	1	1	1	1	1	1	8
Total	36	9	1	2	2	3	1	1	2	1	2	1	1	1	1	1	1	1	1	68

== Tournament review ==
=== Day one ===
Alan Tabern 3–1 Per Laursen
Mark Walsh 0–3 Adrian Gray
Wayne Mardle 3–0 Ray Carver
Jan van der Rassel 3–2 Colin Lloyd

=== Day two ===
Roland Scholten 3–0 Matt Clark
Peter Manley 3–0 Toon Greebe
Phil Taylor 3–2 Michael Van Gerwen
Mervyn King 3–1 Michael Rosenauer

=== Day three, Wednesday 19 December ===
Jamie Caven 2–3 Wes Newton
Denis Ovens 3–1 Colin Monk
Mick Mcgowan 3–0 Jason Barry
Barrie Bates 3–0 Gerry Convery
Jason Clark 3–2 Bob Anderson
Kirk Shepherd 3–1 Terry Jenkins
Chris Mason 3–1 Steve Brown
Kevin Painter 3–0 Gary Mawson

=== Day four, Thursday 20 December ===
Andy Jenkins 3–1 Miloslav Navrátil
Tony Eccles 1–3 Wayne Jones
Andy Hamilton 3–1 Leroy Kwadijk
Alex Roy 3–0 Warren Parry
Steve Maish 3–1 Dennis Priestley
Adrian Lewis 3–1 Dave Askew
Raymond Van Barneveld 3–0 Anthony Forde
Vincent Van Der Voort 3–2 Jelle Klaasen

Day five, Friday 21 December

Alan Warriner-Little 3–1 Shi Yongsheng
Erwin Extercatte 0–3 Colin Osborne
Mensur Suljovic 3–2 Andy Smith
Steve Beaton 3–0 Steve Evans
Ronnie Baxter 3–2 Dan Olson
James Wade 3–0 Steve Macarthur
John Part 3-1 Charles Losper
Mark Dudbridge 3–1 Steve Hine

Alan Tabern 4–0 Andy Jenkins (3–1 3–1 3–1 3–0)
Jan Van Der Rassel 0–4 Denis Ovens (1–3 1–3 2–3 0–3)
Peter Manley 4–2 Shi Yongsheng ( 3–0 3–0 1–3 3–2 0–3 3–1)
Roland Scholten 0–4 Mervyn King ( 0–3 0–3 0–3 1–3)
Phil Taylor 4–1 Adrian Gray ( 1–3 3–0 3–2 3–2 3–0)
Wayne Mardle 4–2 Wes Newton (3–0 1–3 2–3 3–2 3–2 3–1)

=== Sunday 23 December to Tuesday 25 December ===
The tournament went into hiatus for the Christmas period.

Barrie Bates 2–4 Colin Osborne 3–1 2–3 2–3 1–3 3–1 0–3
Kevin Painter 4–0 Chris Mason 3–0 3–0 3–0 3–2
Terry Jenkins 4–0 Mick Mcgowan 3–0 3–1 3–1 3–0
Adrian Lewis 4–3 Vincent Van Der Voort 3–0 3–1 3–0 1–3 1–3 1–3 5–3
John Part 4-1 Mensur Suljovic 3–1 3–1 1–3 3–1 3–1
James Wade 4–0 Steve Beaton 3–2 3–2 3–0 3–0

=== Day eight, Thursday 27 December ===
Wayne Jones 4–0 Steve Maish 3–1 3–0 3–0 3–2
Alex Roy 1–4 Andy Hamilton 3–0 1–3 0–3 2–3 2–3
Mark Dudbridge 2–4 Ronnie Baxter 2–3 2–3 3–1 1–3 3–0 0–3
Raymond Van Barneveld 4–0 Jason Clark 3–0 3–0 3–0 1–3 3–1

Third round (Last 16)

Phil Taylor 4–2 Alan Tabern 0–3 2–3 3–1 3–1 3–0 3–2
Wayne Mardle 4–1 Mervyn King 1–3 3–1 3–2 3–2 3–2

=== Day nine, Friday 28 December ===
Raymond van Barneveld's reign as PDC World Championship was ended by Kevin Painter in a thrilling match which Painter finished off with a ten-dart leg to clinch the match 4–2. Painter hit seven consecutive treble 20s, en route to a possible nine dart leg before missing a treble 19 before completing a remarkable ten darter to go through to the quarter-finals.

Earlier, James Wade overcame flu and Mark Dudbridge 4–2 to go through to his first World quarter-final and Kirk Shepherd defeated Barrie Bates 4–2 to be the surprise quarter-finalist. Peter Manley and John Part both had comfortable wins in their last 16 matches.

The talking point of the day may have been the Adrian Lewis v Tony Eccles clash. Eccles started in sensational fashion winning the first eight legs, but couldn't close out the third set. He missed two darts at a double for a 3–0 sets lead and then Lewis started a fightback winning the next three sets to lead 3–2. Eccles fought back himself to level the match, but controversy came in the final set when the scores were level at 2 legs each. Lewis took an unscheduled comfort break just minutes after a scheduled one and when he came back he found his rhythm to win the next two legs and make the quarter-finals.

Kirk Shepherd 4–2 Barrie Bates (3–0, 1–3, 3–2, 1–3, 3–2, 3–1)
Adrian Lewis 4–3 Tony Eccles (0–3, 0–3, 3–2, 3–0, 3–2, 1–3, 4–2)
James Wade 4–2 Mark Dudbridge (2–3, 3–1, 3–0, 3–2, 1–3, 3–2)
Peter Manley 4–1 Jan Van Der Rassel (2–3, 3–1, 3–2, 3–2, 3–1)
Kevin Painter 4–2 Raymond Van Barneveld (1–3, 3–0, 3–1, 0–3, 3–2, 3–2)
John Part 4-0 Alex Roy (3–1, 3–2, 3–1, 3–1)

=== Day ten, quarter-finals, Saturday 29 December ===
For the first time in the 15-year history of the event, Phil Taylor failed to make it to the final after losing to Wayne Mardle. Taylor took an early 3–0 lead, but after winning a set Mardle's confidence increased and with the crowd behind him brought it back to 3–3. With the sets tied 4–4 the legs went with throw until 4–4 when Mardle broke Taylor with tops after Taylor missed double sixteen when the dart went the wrong side of the wire. Wayne closed out the match on his own darts with 140 and double 18 to win the final set 6–4 and a 5–4 win. Mardle immediately broke down into tears after the win. After the match Mardle said "it's not being in the semis that's important... it's beating that guy there (Taylor); he didn't play well, but I still had to play at my best to beat him"

Taylor said "When I was 3 sets to nil up, I thought I'm going to beat him 5–0... If he gets his game together now he's got the biggest chance of his life to win it".

World Matchplay champion James Wade also went out in the quarter-finals to two-time former World Champion John Part. It was a close match, but Part always stayed in front after establishing a 2–0 set lead. Wade did fight back from 1–3 to level the match.

Kirk Shepherd continued his amazing run and for the third time in the tournament survived his opponent having darts to win the match. Peter Manley had two darts to win the final set 3–0, but Shepherd came back to win the final set 4–2. After sharing the first four sets, Kevin Painter beat Adrian Lewis 5–2.

Kirk Shepherd 5–4 Peter Manley (3–0, 2–3, 3–2, 2–3, 1–3, 3–1, 2–3, 3–1, 4–2)
John Part 5-4 James Wade (3–2, 3–0, 1–3, 3–1, 2–3, 1–3, 3–1, 0–3, 4–2)
Wayne Mardle 5–4 Phil Taylor (0–3, 1–3, 0–3, 3–0, 3–1, 3–2, 2–3, 3–1, 6–4)
Kevin Painter 5–2 Adrian Lewis (3–0, 2–3, 3–0, 1–3, 3–0, 3–1, 3–2)

=== Day Eleven, Semi-finals, Sunday 30 December ===
Kirk Shepherd's sensational run in the tournament continued as he beat Wayne Mardle in the semi-final to reach the final. Shepherd, the 21-year-old qualifier built up a 3–1 set lead and missed five darts to go 4–1 up only to see Mardle come back to take the lead 4–3. Mardle, who had beaten Phil Taylor the previous night in the quarter-finals looked to be on his way to his first world final before Shepherd fought back again to take the next three sets and become the first qualifier to reach the PDC World final.

The other semi-final was a more clinical performance as John Part returned to the final always having the edge over 2004 finalist Kevin Painter. The fourth set was potential decisive as Painter missed darts to take a 2–0 leg lead. Part then took out the next two legs and a 13-darter in the fourth leg gave him a 3–1 set lead. Painter missed a dart at bullseye to bring the score back to 2–3, leaving Part a 44 finish to go 4–1 up – then also missed a chance to take the sixth set. Part took the match with a classy 130 finish for a 6–2 win.

Kirk Shepherd 6–4 Wayne Mardle (0–3, 3–0, 3–2, 3–2, 2–3, 1–3, 2–3, 3–2, 3–1, 3–2)
John Part 6-2 Kevin Painter (3–2, 3–2, 0–3, 3–1, 3–2, 3–2, 0–3, 3–2)

=== Day Twelve, Final, Tuesday 1 January 2008 ===
John Part became World Champion for the third time with a ruthless 7–2 victory over qualifier Kirk Shepherd. Shepherd had beaten world number four Terry Jenkins, three time world finalist Peter Manley and Phil Taylor's conqueror Wayne Mardle to become the first qualifier to reach the PDC World final – but he had no answer to Part's experience in the final. The early stages of the match were close with both of the first two sets going down to a deciding leg. Part just edged the first set and in the deciding leg of the second started with 140, 180 and a 15-dart leg for a 2–0 lead. Part then ran off the next six legs to find himself 4–0 in front and missed a bullseye for a 5–0 lead before Shepherd took his first set. The sixth set again went to last leg with Part re-establishing a four set lead but Shepherd continued to battle away and took the seventh set with a brilliant 160 finish. Part opened the eighth set with a 139 finish, then Shepherd hit an 88 to level it before checkouts of 52 and 80 from Part took him one set away from victory at 6–2. The Canadian closed out victory in the ninth set with a double ten in the fifth leg.

John Part 7-2 Kirk Shepherd (3–2, 3–2, 3–0, 3–0, 2–3, 3–2, 2–3, 3–1, 3–2)

== Trivia ==
- Kirk Shepherd became the youngest player to ever reach a Darts World Championship (PDC or BDO) final. His record was broken on 2 January 2024 when Luke Littler advanced into the 2024 PDC World Darts Championship at the age of 16 years and 348 days.
- No one in the tournament achieved a match average of over 100, for the first time since 1995.
- As a result of Phil Taylor not advancing past the quarter-final stages, Raymond van Barneveld became the world number one.
- The tournament saw the first ever PDC World Championship final without the presence of Phil Taylor.
- None of the 4 semi-finalists from this tournament, the first at Alexandra Palace, have played at World Championship since the 2019 edition with Mardle not having qualified since 2010, Shepherd since 2011, champion Part since 2015, and Painter who failed to qualify in 2019 for the first time since 2001.
- John Part became the first player to win the world championship in three different venues – having won the 1994 BDO World Championship at the Lakeside, the 2003 PDC title at the Circus Tavern and in 2008 at Alexandra Palace.
