= Akihiro Nagakawa =

Japanese darts player (born 1972)

Akihiro Nagakawa 永川 明広
Personal information
- Born: 9 March 1972 (age 54) Tokyo, Japan
- Home town: Hashima, Japan

Sport
- Sport: Darts
- Playing since: 1992
- Darts: 21g Target
- Laterality: Right-handed
- Walk-on music: "Right Here, Right Now" by Fatboy Slim

Organisation (see split in darts)
- PDC: 2006–2010

PDC premier events – best performances
- World Championship: Last 68: 2008
- US Open/WSoD: Last 256: 2010

Other tournament wins
- Tournament: Years
- Japanese National Championships: 2007, 2008

Akihiro Nagakawa (永川 明広, Nagakawa Akihiro; born March 9, 1972) is a Japanese former professional darts player.

== Career ==
Nagakawa qualified for the 2008 PDC World Darts Championship, losing in the preliminary round to Anthony Forde. He qualified again for the 2009 PDC World Darts Championship, but lost again in the preliminary round, this time losing to Warren French. The match with French is widely considered to be the worst match ever in the history of either the PDC or BDO World Championships, where both players averaged 54. The standard was so poor, that Sky Sports stopped broadcasting it halfway through.

== World Championship results ==
=== PDC ===
- 2008: Last 68: (lost to Anthony Forde 2–5) (legs)
- 2009: Last 70: (lost to Warren French 3–5)
