= Sudesh Fitzgerald =

Guyanese darts player (born 1986)

Personal information
- Full name: Sudesh P. Fitzgerald
- Nickname: "His Majesty"
- Born: 8 August 1986 (age 40) Georgetown, Guyana

Sport
- Sport: Darts
- Playing since: 1999
- Darts: 22g Target
- Laterality: Left-handed
- Walk-on music: "Lose Yourself" by Eminem

Organisation (see split in darts)
- BDO: 2002–2008, 2016–2019
- PDC: 2008–2009, 2023-2025

PDC premier events – best performances
- World Championship: Last 70: 2009

Other tournament wins
- Tournament: Years
- Caribbean and South American Masters: 2008

Sudesh P. Fitzgerald (born 8 August 1986, in Georgetown) is a Guyanese former professional darts player. His nickname is His Majesty.

== Playing career ==
Fitzgerald reached the semi-final of the 2008 WDF Americas Cup Singles, losing to Canada's Jerry Hull. Fitzgerald won the 2008 Caribbean and South American Masters to qualify for the 2009 PDC World Darts Championship where he faced South African Charles Losper in the preliminary round and lost 6-4.

=== Regional games ===
- 2010 Mark Persaud and SunFlower Hotel jointly-sponsored tournament, Open Singles darts tournament in 2010.
- 2011 Mark Persaud teamed up with Colin France to play unbeaten in the `501’ league tournament.
- 2012 Fitzgerald and Nicholas Seetaram won the Draw Doubles Darts Tournament, Defended his titles when the National Darts Championships and named player of the year.
- 2013 Guyana Darts Association (GDA) Trophy Stall Pre-Diwali tournament, and Open singles title of the Guyana Darts Association (GDA) tournament.
- 2014 Fitzgerald and Lallchand Rambharose, finished as runners-up in the men’s doubles Bryden’s Barbados Darts Festival. His teammate Rosetta Hiralall, became Guyana's first female international darts title winner during that event. Men’s Doubles 501 was awarded to Fitzgerald and teammate Nicholas Seetaram following the disqualification of the other finalists.
- 2015 Guyana Darts Association Open competition.
- 2016 Led the men’s team to the Caribbean Darts Festival in July 2016 in Barbados and Guyana Darts Association’s (GDA) Massy Industries Colgate/ Palmolive Darts tournament in 2018.

In 2018 he reached the final of the South and Central American 2019 PDC World Darts Championship qualifier in the Open Category and the mixed division, but lost 6–4 to Diogo Portela.

== World Championship Results ==
=== PDC ===
- 2009: Last 70: (lost to Charles Losper 4–6) (legs)
