= Charles Losper =

South African darts player (born 1969)

Personal information
- Nickname: "The Sensation"
- Born: 18 March 1969 (age 57) Retreat, Cape Town, South Africa
- Home town: Cape Town, South Africa

Sport
- Sport: Darts
- Playing since: 1991
- Darts: 24 Gram
- Laterality: Right-handed
- Walk-on music: "Now You're Gone" by Whitesnake

Organisation (see split in darts)
- BDO: 2003–2006
- PDC: 2006–2015, 2021–2025

PDC premier events – best performances
- World Championship: Last 64: 2008, 2009
- Grand Slam: Group Stages: 2007

Other tournament wins
- Years
PDC World South Africa Qualifying	2007, 2008, 2021
SAPDO 501 Double Away	2013
SAPDO Western Cape Ranking	2013
Philippines Open	2021

Charles Losper (born 18 March 1969) is a South African professional darts player who plays in Professional Darts Corporation (PDC) events.

== Darts career ==
Having started playing darts in 1991, Losper's first major tournament appearance was in the 2003 WDF World Cup with the South African team. Having stayed with them for 3 years, he joined the Professional Darts Corporation in 2006 and made his first PDC tournament appearance in the South African Open. He failed to qualify for the final stages of the tournament but returned in 2007 to come through the 155 player field and win the tournament, beating Lodewyk Marais 4–0 in the final. As one of the top four players in the tournament, he qualified for the televised South African Masters the next day, where those top four met the top four players in the PDC. Losper was drawn against then-World Champion Raymond van Barneveld and despite losing 4-1 was the only South African player to win a leg against the professionals.

The South African Open win also guaranteed Losper a place in the inaugural 2007 Grand Slam of Darts. He lost all three group games however, losing to Andy Hamilton, Terry Jenkins and Vincent van der Voort. He also qualified for the 2008 PDC World Championship but lost 3–1 in the first round to John Part, who went on to win the tournament.

In August 2008, Losper made a trip to the Australian leg of the PDC Pro Tour. There he reached the final of the Shoalhaven Classic and the last 16 of the Australian Players Championship. The next month Losper successfully defended his South African Open title with a 4–1 victory over Mark Jackson, which earned him a place in the 2009 PDC World Championship. On the way to his second title Losper played the best leg of the qualifying phase with a 12-dart finish, the best of the tournament. This title also meant he played in the South African Masters for the second successive year, though he lost 4–1 to Wayne Mardle.

At the 2009 PDC World Championship, Losper beat Guyana's Sudesh Fitzgerald in the preliminary round and but lost to Colin Osborne 3–0 in the first round.

Losper quit the PDC in 2015.

In November 2020, Losper played in the African Qualifier but lost to Cameron Carolissen 4–7 in the final.

In October 24, 2021, Losper won the 2021 PDC African Qualifier by defeating Carl Gabriel 7–5 in the final. However, he withdrew from the 2022 PDC World Darts Championship due to visa issues.

== Personal life ==
Outside of darts, Losper works as a policeman in an armed response unit, having been a member of the police force for nearly 20 years.

== World Championship results ==
=== PDC ===
- 2008: First round (lost to John Part 1–3) (sets)
- 2009: First round (lost to Colin Osborne 0–3)
