= Hannes Schnier =

Austrian darts player

Personal information
- Full name: Johannes Schnier
- Nickname: "The Ram"
- Born: 23 March 1977 (age 49) Vienna, Austria
- Home town: Vienna, Austria

Sport
- Sport: Darts
- Playing since: 1992
- Darts: 21g Bull's
- Laterality: Right-handed
- Walk-on music: "Rock Me Amadeus" by Falco

Organisation (see split in darts)
- BDO: 2012–2017
- PDC: 2007–2012, 2018–
- WDF: 2012–2017, 2023–

WDF major events – best performances
- World Championship: Last 32: 2024
- World Masters: Last 64: 2012

PDC premier events – best performances
- World Championship: Last 70: 2009
- European Championship: Last 32: 2008

Other tournament wins
- Years
Balaton Classics	2023
Balaton Masters	2023
Lakitelek Classic	2024
Medal record
Men's Darts
Representing Austria
EDF European Ch'ship
Silver medal – second place	2016 Podčetrtek	Men's cricket
WDF World Cup
Bronze medal – third place	2023 Esbjerg	Men's Pairs

Johannes Schnier (born 23 March 1977) is an Austrian darts player who plays in Professional Darts Corporation (PDC) and World Darts Federation (WDF) events.

== Career ==
In June 2006, Schnier won the Austrian National Championship, beating Dietmar Burger in the final. Since 2007, Schnier has played in tournaments sanctioned by the German Darts Corporation, an affiliate of the PDC where its highest ranked player earns automatic qualification for the PDC World Darts Championship. He has made numerous quarter final and semi final appearances but has so far only managed to win one GDC ranked event in Niedernhausen in May 2008.

Schnier made his televised debut in the inaugural European Darts Championship in Frankfurt, Germany where he lost in the first round to Adrian Lewis.

Schnier finished 2nd in the GDC rankings in 2008 and as the top GDC player Mensur Suljović qualified as one of the four top ranked Europeans on the PDC Order of Merit, Schnier earned qualification for the 2009 PDC World Darts Championship but lost to China's Shi Yongsheng 6–4 in the preliminary round.

Schnier signed a sponsorship deal with UK darts manufacturers Showtime Darts in 2016.

Schnier represented Austria at the 2023 WDF World Cup in Denmark and won a Bronze medal alongside Markus Straub in the Men's Pairs.

Schnier won his first two WDF titles in 2023, winning the Balaton Classic and Masters in Hungary. He added another title in 2024, the Lakitelek Classic, which led to him qualifying for a first WDF World Championship. At Lakeside, Schnier won his opening game 2–1 against Laszlo Kadar with a 90.91 average before losing 3–0 to Jason Brandon in the Last 32.

== World Championship results ==
=== PDC ===
- 2009: Last 70 (lost to Shi Yongsheng 4–6) (legs)

=== WDF ===
- 2024: Last 32 (lost to Jason Brandon 0–3) (sets)
