= Professional Darts Players Association =

Organisation for professional dart players

The Professional Darts Players Association Ltd (PDPA) is an organisation for professional darts players. It was formed in December 1986. Its intention is to look after the interests of all professional players through an annually-elected Board. The association works in partnership with the Professional Darts Corporation (PDC) and the Darts Regulation Authority (DRA). It is headed by President Alan Warriner-Little and Chairman Peter Manley.

== Formation ==
The PDPA was initially formed in the early 1980s with the first members being John Lowe, Dave Whitcombe, Ritchie Gardner, Bob Anderson, Eric Bristow and Alan Evans.

== Current board ==
Board of Directors:

- Alan Warriner-Little (President)
- Peter Manley (chairman)
- Andy Scott (Vice Chairman)
- Jacques Nieuwlaat (Director)
- Jamie Caven (Director)
- Glen Durrant (Director)
- Nicola Johnston (Administrator)

== Work with the Professional Darts Corporation ==
According to PDC Rule 1.1, all players who participate in PDC events must have a PDPA membership. The PDPA has different types of membership status:

- Full Member – Member with a PDC Tour Card or a player who has qualified for a PDC televised event
- Associate Member – PDPA member who does not have a Tour Card
- European Tour Member – Member who pays an additional fee in order to enter PDC European Tour qualifiers
- Secondary Tour Member – Member who is only allowed to play in Secondary Tour events
- Honorary Member – Member awarded the title at the discretion of the PDPA for the person's service to darts

The PDPA holds qualifiers for PDC Tour Card holders to a number of PDC televised events: the PDC World Darts Championship, the Grand Slam of Darts and the World Series of Darts Finals.

In 2020, the PDPA financially assisted PDC Tour Card holders who were negatively impacted by the COVID-19 pandemic, which saw the postponement and cancellation of darts events.
