= 2013 Denmark Open darts =

Denmark Open

Tournament information
- Dates: 6 April 2013
- Country: Denmark
- Organisation(s): BDO, WDF, DDU
- Winner's share: 18,000 DKK

Champion(s)
- (Netherlands) Jeffrey de Graaf

2013 Denmark Open is a darts tournament, which took place in Denmark in 2013.

== Results ==
=== Last 32 ===
Player
(Denmark) Niels Jørgen Hansen
(Denmark) Kim Frithjof
(Denmark) Frede Johansen
(Netherlands) John Lokken
(Denmark) Jan Rasmussen
(Denmark) Nicolai Rasmussen
(Denmark) Klaus Reinhold
(Denmark) Stig Jørgensen
(Denmark) Carl Hansen
(Sweden) Peter Sajwani
(Denmark) Dennis Lindskjold
(Netherlands) Robert van der Gulik
(Denmark) Finn Jacobsen
(Denmark) Tonny Madsen
(Denmark) Kasper Hansen
(Denmark) Jimmi Andersen

=== Last 16 ===
Final 16
(Netherlands)	Jeffrey de Graaf
(Netherlands)	Ron Meulenkamp
(Netherlands)	Yordi Meeuwisse
(Denmark)	John Lind Drue
(Denmark)	Mogens Christensen
(Netherlands)	Martin Jongejan
(Denmark)	Heine Nielsen
(Netherlands)	Willy van de Wiel
(Netherlands)	Jan Dekker
(Denmark)	Daniel Hadberg Drue
(Netherlands)	Remco van Eijden
(Denmark)	Glenn Honore
(Denmark)	Per Laursen
(England)	Sam Head
(Denmark)	Bjarne Iversen
(Denmark)	Ole Jørgensen

Quarter-finals
(Netherlands)	Jeffrey de Graaf
(Netherlands)	Yordi Meeuwisse
(Denmark)	Mogens Christensen
(Denmark)	Heine Nielsen
(Netherlands)	Jan Dekker
(Netherlands)	Remco van Eijden
(Denmark)	Per Laursen
(Denmark)	Bjarne Iversen

Semi-finals
(Netherlands)	Jeffrey de Graaf
(Denmark)	Mogens Christensen
(Netherlands)	Jan Dekker
(Denmark)	Per Laursen

Final
(Netherlands)	Jeffrey de Graaf
(Netherlands)	Jan Dekker
