= 2004 WDF Europe Cup =

Tournament information
- Venue: Scandic Hotel Rosendahl
- Location: Tampere
- Country: Finland
- Established: 13 Oct-16 Oct
- Organisation(s): WDF
- Format: Legs

Champion(s)
- Singles; Raymond van Barneveld (men's singles); Francis Hoenselaar (women's singles); Pairs (Netherlands) Raymond van Barneveld & Vincent van der Voort (men's pairs); Trina Gulliver & Claire Bywaters (women's pairs); Team; England (men's team); Overall; Netherlands (men's overall); England (women's overall)

The 2004 WDF Europe Cup was the 14th edition of the WDF Europe Cup darts tournament, organised by the World Darts Federation. It was held in Tampere, Finland from 27 Aug-30 Aug.

== Entered teams ==
21 countries/associations entered a men's selection in the event.

20 countries/associations entered a women's selection in the event.

Nr.	Country	Men's Selection
1	Austria	Franz Thaler, August Jost, Marcus Haider, Axel Tajmel
2	Belgium	Arnold Paap, Mario Vandenbogaerde, Daniel Bottelbergs, Kurt van de Rijck
3	Denmark	Per Laursen, Soren Behrendsen, Brian Buur, Dennis Lindskjold
4	England	John Walton, Ted Hankey, Martin Adams, Mervyn King
5	Estonia	Tiit Heidak, Raido Kadopa, Mati Leis, Kaido Poldma
6	Finland	Ulf Ceder, Jarkko Komula, Marko Kantele, Kim Viljanen
7	France	Glenn Brooksbank, Cyril Blot, Sebastian Petitieau, Erkan Kaplan
8	Germany	Marcel Schmidt, Andree Welge, Colin Rice, Tomas Seyler
9	Gibraltar	Dylan Duo, Manuel Vilerio, Henry Zapata, Hannu Suominen
10	Greece	Panagiotis Zalonis, Stelios Terezis, Niklos Bouganikolas, John Michael
11	Hungary	Nándor Bezzeg, Tamas Turi, Bela Balogh, Romeo Gyalai
12	Ireland	Richard McMahon, Eddie Cull, Aodhagan O'Neill, Sean McGowan
13	Italy	Luigi Marino, Alen Stacul, Luca Agnelli, Loris Polese
14	Netherlands	Vincent van der Voort, Raymond van Barneveld, Mario Robbe, Dick van Dijk
15	Northern Ireland	Paul Watton, John Elder, Daryl Gurney, Brian Cathcart
16	Norway	Roy Trevland, Stian Lyngfeldt, Jacques Langston, Robert Wagner
17	Russia	Igor Manturov, Vladimir Kurakin, Alexey Zhuravlev, Yuri Salev
18	Scotland	Paul McGimpsey, Paul Hanvidge, Gary Anderson, Mike Veitch
19	Sweden	Ronny Rohr, Johan Engström, Markus Korhonen, Daniel Larsson
20	Switzerland	Urs Von Rufs, Peter Schonauer, Bruno Gfeller, Jurg Engel
21	Wales	Ritchie Davies, Wayne Warren, Martin Phillips, Peter Johns

Nr.	Country	Women's Selection
1	Austria	Judith Walkner & Marion Petschenig
2	Belgium	Wendy Beutels & Christiane Soudan
3	Denmark	Mona Lund & Janni Larsen
4	England	Trina Gulliver & Clare Bywaters
5	Estonia	Reili Roodla & Triin Timmermann
6	Finland	Marika Juhola & Tarja Salminen
7	France	Valere Gaudion & Laetitia Glemin
8	Germany	Beatrix Krockel & Heike Ernst
9	Hungary	Nora Fekete & Adel Urgyan
10	Ireland	Nicola McKenna & Maureen Kelly
11	Italy	Chiara Bassega & Mojca Humar
12	Latvia	Inita Bite & Ligita Vilks
13	Netherlands	Karin Krappen & Francis Hoenselaar
14	Northern Ireland	Denise Cassidy & Grace Crane
15	Norway	Hege Løkken & Tone Eriksen-Wagner
16	Russia	Olga Meyer & Anastasia Dobromyslova
17	Scotland	Anne Kirk & Louise Hepburn
18	Sweden	Maud Jansson & Carina Ekberg
19	Switzerland	Nathalie Kallen & Barbara Guldimann
20	Wales	Jan Robbins & Chris Savvery

== Men's singles ==
1st Round (best of 7 legs)
(England) Martin Adams
Bye
(Switzerland) Peter Schonauer
Bye
(Finland) Kim Viljanen	4
(Wales) Wayne Warren	3
(Denmark) Brian Buur
Bye
(Netherlands) Vincent van der Voort	4
(Estonia) Raido Kadopa	0
(Gibraltar) Henry Zapata
Bye
(Belgium) Daniel Bottelbergs
Bye
(France) Glenn Brooksbank
Bye
(Russia) Vladimir Kurakin	0
(Scotland) Paul McGimpsey	4
(Hungary) Tamas Turi
Bye
(Italy) Alen Stacul
Bye
(Republic of Ireland) Aodhagan O'Neill
Bye
(Austria) August Jost	3
(Norway) Jacques Langston	4
(Greece) Panagiotis Zalonis	2
(Sweden) Johan Engström	4
(Germany) Marcel Schmidt
Bye
(Northern Ireland) John Elder
Bye
(Netherlands) Raymond van Barneveld
Bye
(England) Mervyn King
Bye
(Denmark) Søren Behrendsen
Bye
(Scotland) Paul Hanvidge
Bye
(Sweden) Daniel Larsson
Bye
(Germany) Tomas Seyler
Bye
(Greece) Niklos Bouganikolas
Bye
(Hungary) Bela Balogh	0
(France) Erkan Kaplan	4
(Gibraltar) Manuel Vilerio	0
(Belgium) Kurt van de Rijck	4
(Italy) Loris Polese	4
(Austria) Axel Tajmel	1
(Northern Ireland) Brian Cathcart	3
(Republic of Ireland) Eddie Cull	4
(Norway) Roy Trevland
Bye
(Russia) Igor Manturov
Bye
(Estonia) Mati Leis	0
(Switzerland) Bruno Gfeller	4
(Finland) Jarkko Komula
Bye
(Wales) Ritchie Davies
Bye
(Scotland) Gary Anderson
Bye
(Hungary) Nándor Bezzeg
Bye
(Estonia) Kaido Poldma
Bye
(Italy) Luca Agnelli	2
(Finland) Marko Kantele	4
(France) Sebastian Petitieau
Bye
(Austria) Marcus Haider
Bye
(Norway) Stian Lyngfeldt	1
(Germany) Andree Welge	4
(Switzerland) Urs Von Rufs
Bye
(Northern Ireland) Daryl Gurney
Bye
(England) Ted Hankey	4
(Gibraltar) Dylan Duo	1
(Netherlands) Dick van Dijk	4
(Sweden) Ronny Rohr	0
(Wales) Peter Johns
Bye
(Denmark) Per Laursen	4
(Republic of Ireland) Richard McMahon	0
(Greece) John Michael
Bye
(Russia) Alexey Zhuravlev
Bye
(Belgium) Mario Vandenbogaerde
Bye
(Sweden) Markus Korhonen
Bye
(Wales) Martin Phillips	4
(France) Cyril Blot	0
(Republic of Ireland) Sean McGowan
Bye
(Belgium) Arnold Paap	4
(Greece) Stelios Terezis	0
(Hungary) Romeo Gyalai	2
(Denmark) Dennis Lindskjold	4
(Germany) Colin Rice	1
(Russia) Yuri Salev	4
(Estonia) Tiit Heidak
Bye
(Scotland) Mike Veitch	2
(Northern Ireland) Paul Watton	4
(England) John Walton
Bye
(Finland) Ulf Ceder
Bye
(Norway) Robert Wagner
Bye
(Italy) Luigi Marino
Bye
(Switzerland) Jurg Engel
Bye
(Netherlands) Mario Robbe
Bye
(Gibraltar) Hannu Suominen
Bye
(Austria) Franz Thaler
Bye

2nd Round (best of 7 legs)
(England) Martin Adams	4
(Switzerland) Peter Schonauer	1
(Finland) Kim Viljanen	4
(Denmark) Brian Buur	1
(Netherlands) Vincent van der Voort	4
(Gibraltar) Henry Zapata	0
(Belgium) Daniel Bottelbergs	1
(France) Glenn Brooksbank	4
(Scotland) Paul McGimpsey	4
(Hungary) Tamas Turi	1
(Italy) Alen Stacul	2
(Republic of Ireland) Aodhagan O'Neill	4
(Norway) Jacques Langston	1
(Sweden) Johan Engström	4
(Germany) Marcel Schmidt	0
(Northern Ireland) John Elder	4
(Netherlands) Raymond van Barneveld	4
(England) Mervyn King	0
(Denmark) Søren Behrendsen	4
(Scotland) Paul Hanvidge	1
(Sweden) Daniel Larsson	4
(Germany) Tomas Seyler	2
(Greece) Niklos Bouganikolas	3
(France) Erkan Kaplan	4
(Belgium) Kurt van de Rijck	4
(Italy) Loris Polese	3
(Republic of Ireland) Eddie Cull	3
(Norway) Roy Trevland	4
(Russia) Igor Manturov	4
(Switzerland) Bruno Gfeller	1
(Finland) Jarkko Komula	4
(Wales) Ritchie Davies	1
(Scotland) Gary Anderson	4
(Hungary) Nándor Bezzeg	0
(Estonia) Kaido Poldma	0
(Finland) Marko Kantele	4
(France) Sebastian Petitieau	4
(Austria) Marcus Haider	0
(Germany) Andree Welge	4
(Switzerland) Urs Von Rufs	1
(Northern Ireland) Daryl Gurney	0
(England) Ted Hankey	4
(Netherlands) Dick van Dijk	4
(Wales) Peter Johns	2
(Denmark) Per Laursen	4
(Greece) John Michael	1
(Russia) Alexey Zhuravlev	0
(Belgium) Mario Vandenbogaerde	4
(Sweden) Markus Korhonen	1
(Wales) Martin Phillips	4
(Republic of Ireland) Sean McGowan	4
(Belgium) Arnold Paap	1
(Denmark) Dennis Lindskjold	4
(Russia) Yuri Salev	3
(Estonia) Tiit Heidak	0
(Northern Ireland) Paul Watton	4
(England) John Walton	1
(Finland) Ulf Ceder	4
(Norway) Robert Wagner	4
(Italy) Luigi Marino	3
(Switzerland) Jurg Engel	0
(Netherlands) Mario Robbe	4
(Gibraltar) Hannu Suominen	4
(Austria) Franz Thaler	2

3rd Round (best of 7 legs)
(England) Martin Adams	3
(Finland) Kim Viljanen	4
(Netherlands) Vincent van der Voort	4
(France) Glenn Brooksbank	2
(Scotland) Paul McGimpsey	2
(Republic of Ireland) Aodhagan O'Neill	4
(Sweden) Johan Engström	4
(Northern Ireland) John Elder	2
(Netherlands) Raymond van Barneveld	4
(Denmark) Søren Behrendsen	0
(Sweden) Daniel Larsson	4
(France) Erkan Kaplan	1
(Belgium) Kurt van de Rijck	4
(Norway) Roy Trevland	1
(Russia) Igor Manturov	2
(Finland) Jarkko Komula	4
(Scotland) Gary Anderson	1
(Finland) Marko Kantele	4
(Denmark) Sebastian Petitieau	2
(Germany) Andree Welge	4
(England) Ted Hankey	4
(Netherlands) Dick van Dijk	1
(Denmark) Per Laursen	4
(Belgium) Mario Vandenbogaerde	1
(Wales) Martin Phillips	2
(Republic of Ireland) Sean McGowan	4
(Denmark) Dennis Lindskjold	4
(Northern Ireland) Paul Watton	0
(Finland) Ulf Ceder	2
(Norway) Robert Wagner	4
(Netherlands) Mario Robbe	4
(Gibraltar) Hannu Suominen	1

4th Round (best of 7 legs)
(Finland) Kim Viljanen	2
(Netherlands) Vincent van der Voort	4
(Republic of Ireland) Aodhagan O'Neill	1
(Sweden) Johan Engström	4
(Netherlands) Raymond van Barneveld	4
(Sweden) Daniel Larsson	0
(Belgium) Kurt van de Rijck	2
(Finland) Jarkko Komula	4
(Finland) Marko Kantele	4
(Germany) Andree Welge	2
(England) Ted Hankey	1
(Denmark) Per Laursen	4
(Republic of Ireland) Sean McGowan	2
(Denmark) Dennis Lindskjold	4
(Norway) Robert Wagner	4
(Netherlands) Mario Robbe	1

Quarter-finals (best of 7 legs)
(Netherlands) Vincent van der Voort	4
(Sweden) Johan Engström	1
(Netherlands) Raymond van Barneveld	4
(Finland) Jarkko Komula	3
(Finland) Marko Kantele	4
(Denmark) Per Laursen	2
(Denmark) Dennis Lindskjold	1
(Norway) Robert Wagner	4

Semi-finals (best of 7 legs)
(Netherlands) Vincent van der Voort	0
(Netherlands) Raymond van Barneveld	4
Final (best of 7 legs)
(Netherlands) Raymond van Barneveld	4
(Norway) Robert Wagner	2
(Finland) Marko Kantele	2
(Norway) Robert Wagner	4

== Men's Pairs ==
1st Round (best of 7 legs)
(England) Mervyn King (England) Martin Adams
Bye
(Northern Ireland) Daryl Gurney (Northern Ireland) Paul Watton
Bye
(Sweden) Daniel Larsson (Sweden) Ronny Rohr
Bye
(Austria) Axel Tajmel (Austria) Marcus Haider	2
(Italy) Luca Agnelli (Italy) Alen Stacul	4
(Hungary) Romeo Gyalai (Hungary) Nándor Bezzeg
Bye
(Greece) John Michael (Greece) Niklos Bouganikolas
Bye
(Germany) Marcel Schmidt (Germany) Colin Rice	4
(Republic of Ireland) Aodhagan O'Neill (Republic of Ireland) Richard McMahon	1
(Wales) Ritchie Davies (Wales) Martin Phillips
Bye
(Switzerland) Peter Schonauer (Switzerland) Urs Von Rufs
Bye
(Finland) Kim Viljanen (Finland) Jarkko Komula	4
(Norway) Roy Trevland (Norway) Robert Wagner	2
(Gibraltar) Henry Zapata (Gibraltar) Manuel Vilerio
Bye
(Belgium) Kurt van de Rijck (Belgium) Daniel Bottelbergs
Bye
(Russia) Yuri Salev (Russia) Igor Manturov
Bye
(Estonia) Kaido Poldma (Estonia) Tiit Heidak	1
(Scotland) Paul Hanvidge (Scotland) Paul McGimpsey	4
(Netherlands) Dick van Dijk (Netherlands) Mario Robbe	4
(France) Erkan Kaplan (France) Cyril Blot	0
(Denmark) Brian Buur (Denmark) Soren Behrendsen
Bye
(Scotland) Gary Anderson (Scotland) Mike Veitch
Bye
(Italy) Loris Polese (Italy) Luigi Marino
Bye
(France) Glenn Brooksbank (France) Sebastian Petitieau
Bye
(Gibraltar) Dylan Duo (Gibraltar) Hannu Suominen	4
(Hungary) Bela Balogh (Hungary) Tamas Turi	1
(Denmark) Dennis Lindskjold (Denmark) Per Laursen	4
(Russia) Vladimir Kurakin (Russia) Alexey Zhuravlev	1
(Germany) Tomas Seyler (Germany) Andree Welge
Bye
(Republic of Ireland) Eddie Cull (Republic of Ireland) Sean McGowan
Bye
(Austria) Franz Thaler (Austria) August Jost
Bye
(Finland) Marko Kantele (Finland) Ulf Ceder
Bye
(Sweden) Markus Korhonen (Sweden) Johan Engström
Bye
(Norway) Stian Lyngfeldt (Norway) Jacques Langston
Bye
(Estonia) Raido Kadopa (Estonia) Mati Leis
Bye
(England) John Walton (England) Ted Hankey	4
(Greece) Panagiotis Zalonis (Greece) Stelios Terezis	1
(Northern Ireland) John Elder (Northern Ireland) Brian Cathcart	4
(Belgium) Arnold Paap (Belgium) Mario Vandenbogaerde	2
(Wales) Peter Johns (Wales) Wayne Warren	4
(Switzerland) Bruno Gfeller (Switzerland) Jurg Engel	3
(Netherlands) Vincent van der Voort (Netherlands) Raymond van Barneveld
Bye

2nd Round (best of 7 legs)
(England) Mervyn King (England) Martin Adams	4
(Northern Ireland) Daryl Gurney (Northern Ireland) Paul Watton	2
(Sweden) Daniel Larsson (Sweden) Ronny Rohr	4
(Italy) Luca Agnelli (Italy) Alen Stacul	0
(Hungary) Romeo Gyalai (Hungary) Nándor Bezzeg	3
(Greece) John Michael (Greece) Niklos Bouganikolas	4
(Germany) Marcel Schmidt (Germany) Colin Rice	1
(Wales) Ritchie Davies (Wales) Martin Phillips	4
(Switzerland) Peter Schonauer (Switzerland) Urs Von Rufs	2
(Finland) Kim Viljanen (Finland) Jarkko Komula	4
(Gibraltar) Henry Zapata (Gibraltar) Manuel Vilerio	2
(Belgium) Kurt van de Rijck (Belgium) Daniel Bottelbergs	4
(Russia) Yuri Salev (Russia) Igor Manturov	3
(Scotland) Paul Hanvidge (Scotland) Paul McGimpsey	4
(Netherlands) Dick van Dijk (Netherlands) Mario Robbe	4
(Denmark) Brian Buur (Denmark) Soren Behrendsen	0
(Scotland) Gary Anderson (Scotland) Mike Veitch	4
(Italy) Loris Polese (Italy) Luigi Marino	0
(France) Glenn Brooksbank (France) Sebastian Petitieau	1
(Gibraltar) Dylan Duo (Gibraltar) Hannu Suominen	4
(Denmark) Dennis Lindskjold (Denmark) Per Laursen	4
(Germany) Tomas Seyler (Germany) Andree Welge	0
(Republic of Ireland) Eddie Cull (Republic of Ireland) Sean McGowan	3
(Austria) Franz Thaler (Austria) August Jost	4
(Finland) Marko Kantele (Finland) Ulf Ceder	2
(Sweden) Markus Korhonen (Sweden) Johan Engström	4
(Norway) Stian Lyngfeldt (Norway) Jacques Langston	4
(Estonia) Raido Kadopa (Estonia) Mati Leis	1
(England) John Walton (England) Ted Hankey	4
(Northern Ireland) John Elder (Northern Ireland) Brian Cathcart	3
(Wales) Peter Johns (Wales) Wayne Warren	0
(Netherlands) Vincent van der Voort (Netherlands) Raymond van Barneveld	4

3rd Round (best of 7 legs)
(England) Mervyn King (England) Martin Adams	4
(Sweden) Daniel Larsson (Sweden) Ronny Rohr	3
(Greece) John Michael (Greece) Niklos Bouganikolas	1
(Wales) Ritchie Davies (Wales) Martin Phillips	4
(Finland) Kim Viljanen (Finland) Jarkko Komula	4
(Belgium) Kurt van de Rijck (Belgium) Daniel Bottelbergs	1
(Scotland) Paul Hanvidge (Scotland) Paul McGimpsey	3
(Netherlands) Dick van Dijk (Netherlands) Mario Robbe	4
(Scotland) Gary Anderson (Scotland) Mike Veitch	4
(Gibraltar) Dylan Duo (Gibraltar) Hannu Suominen	1
(Denmark) Dennis Lindskjold (Denmark) Per Laursen	2
(Austria) Franz Thaler (Austria) August Jost	4
(Sweden) Markus Korhonen (Sweden) Johan Engström	4
(Norway) Stian Lyngfeldt (Norway) Jacques Langston	1
(England) John Walton (England) Ted Hankey	0
(Netherlands) Vincent van der Voort (Netherlands) Raymond van Barneveld	4

Quarter-finals (best of 7 legs)
(England) Mervyn King (England) Martin Adams	4
(Wales) Ritchie Davies (Wales) Martin Phillips	2
(Finland) Kim Viljanen (Finland) Jarkko Komula	4
(Netherlands) Dick van Dijk (Netherlands) Mario Robbe	0
(Scotland) Gary Anderson (Scotland) Mike Veitch	4
(Austria) Franz Thaler (Austria) August Jost	1
(Sweden) Markus Korhonen (Sweden) Johan Engström	1
(Netherlands) Vincent van der Voort (Netherlands) Raymond van Barneveld	4

Semi-finals (best of 7 legs)
(England) Mervyn King (England) Martin Adams	4
(Finland) Kim Viljanen (Finland) Jarkko Komula	1
(Scotland) Gary Anderson (Scotland) Mike Veitch	3
(Netherlands) Vincent van der Voort (Netherlands) Raymond van Barneveld	4

Final (best of 7 legs)
(England) Mervyn King (England) Martin Adams	3
(Netherlands) Vincent van der Voort (Netherlands) Raymond van Barneveld	4

== Men's team ==
Round Robin

Group A

Pos	Team	Pld	Win	Lose	LF	LA	+/-
1	Sweden	4	4	0	36	17	+19
2	Scotland	4	2	2	33	26	+7
3	(Republic of Ireland) Ireland	4	2	2	30	28	+2
4	Hungary	4	2	2	25	31	-6
5	Russia	4	0	4	14	36	-22

- Sweden 9 - 8 Scotland
- Sweden 9 - 4 (Republic of Ireland) Ireland
- Sweden 9 - 3 Hungary
- Sweden 9 - 2 Russia
- Scotland 9 - 4 Hungary
- Scotland 9 - 4 Russia
- (Republic of Ireland) Ireland 9 - 7 Scotland
- (Republic of Ireland) Ireland 9 - 3 Russia
- Hungary 9 - 8 (Republic of Ireland) Ireland
- Hungary 9 - 5 Russia

Group B

Pos	Team	Pld	Win	Lose	LF	LA	+/-
1	England	4	4	0	36	16	+20
2	Wales	4	3	1	33	16	+17
3	Germany	4	2	2	25	24	+1
4	Greece	4	1	3	14	32	-18
5	France	4	0	4	16	36	-20

- England 9 - 6 Wales
- England 9 - 4 Germany
- England 9 - 0 Greece
- England 9 - 6 France
- Wales 9 - 3 Germany
- Wales 9 - 2 Greece
- Wales 9 - 2 France
- Germany 9 - 3 Greece
- Germany 9 - 3 France
- Greece 9 - 5 France

Group C

Pos	Team	Pld	Win	Lose	LF	LA	+/-
1	Netherlands	5	5	0	45	19	+26
2	Norway	5	4	1	43	26	+17
3	Northern Ireland	5	3	2	35	29	+6
4	Switzerland	5	2	3	25	38	-13
5	Italy	5	1	4	36	39	-3
6	Estonia	5	0	5	9	45	-36

- Netherlands 9 - 7 Norway
- Netherlands 9 - 3 Northern Ireland
- Netherlands 9 - 3 Switzerland
- Netherlands 9 - 6 Italy
- Netherlands 9 - 0 Estonia
- Norway 9 - 5 Northern Ireland
- Norway 9 - 2 Switzerland
- Norway 9 - 8 Italy
- Norway 9 - 2 Estonia
- Northern Ireland 9 - 2 Switzerland
- Northern Ireland 9 - 5 Italy
- Northern Ireland 9 - 1 Estonia
- Switzerland 9 - 8 Italy
- Switzerland 9 - 3 Estonia
- Italy 9 - 3 Estonia

Group D

Pos	Team	Pld	Win	Lose	LF	LA	+/-
1	Belgium	4	4	0	36	19	+17
2	Finland	4	3	1	34	13	+21
3	Denmark	4	2	2	27	23	+4
4	Gibraltar	4	1	3	16	33	-17
5	Austria	4	0	4	11	36	-25

- Belgium 9 - 7 Finland
- Belgium 9 - 6 Denmark
- Belgium 9 - 7 Gibraltar
- Belgium 9 - 3 Austria
- Finland 9 - 2 Denmark
- Finland 9 - 1 Gibraltar
- Finland 9 - 1 Austria
- Denmark 9 - 4 Gibraltar
- Denmark 9 - 1 Austria
- Gibraltar 9 - 6 Austria

Knock Out

Quarter-finals (best of 17 legs)
A1	Sweden	4
D2	Finland	9
B1	England	9
C2	Norway	3
C1	Netherlands	5
B2	Wales	9
D1	Belgium	8
A2	Scotland	9

Semi-finals (best of 17 legs)
D2	Finland	3
B1	England	9
B2	Wales	6
A2	Scotland	9

Final (best of 17 legs)
B1	England	9
A2	Scotland	7

== Women's singles ==
1st Round (best of 7 legs)
(Netherlands) Francis Hoenselaar
Bye
(Norway) Hege Løkken	4
(Italy) Chiara Bassega	0
(Sweden) Maud Jansson
Bye
(Estonia) Triin Timmermann
Bye
(Northern Ireland) Grace Crane
Bye
(Finland) Marika Juhola
Bye
(Denmark) Janni Larsen	4
(Germany) Beatrix Krockel	3
(Scotland) Anne Kirk
Bye
(Switzerland) Nathalie Kallen
Bye
(Republic of Ireland) Maureen Kelly
Bye
(Austria) Marion Petschenig
Bye
(Latvia) Inita Bite	2
(Russia) Olga Meyer	4
(France) Valere Gaudion
Bye
(England) Clare Bywaters	4
(Belgium) Wendy Beutels	2
(Hungary) Adel Urgyan
Bye
(Wales) Jan Robbins
Bye
(England) Trina Gulliver
Bye
(Finland) Tarja Salminen	4
(Netherlands) Karin Krappen	1
(Austria) Judith Walkner	0
(Hungary) Nora Fekete	4
(Italy) Mojca Humar
Bye
(Wales) Chris Savvery
Bye
(Belgium) Christiane Soudan
Bye
(Switzerland) Barbara Guldimann	0
(Scotland) Louise Hepburn	4
(Denmark) Mona Lund
Bye
(Republic of Ireland) Nicola McKenna
Bye
(Sweden) Carina Ekberg
Bye
(France) Laetitia Glemin	0
(Northern Ireland) Denise Cassidy	4
(Latvia) Ligita Vilks
Bye
(Estonia) Reili Roodla
Bye
(Germany) Heike Ernst
Bye
(Norway) Tone Eriksen-Wagner
Bye
(Russia) Anastasia Dobromyslova
Bye

2nd Round (best of 7 legs)
(Netherlands) Francis Hoenselaar	4
(Norway) Hege Løkken	1
(Sweden) Maud Jansson	4
(Estonia) Triin Timmermann	0
(Northern Ireland) Grace Crane	3
(Finland) Marika Juhola	4
(Denmark) Janni Larsen	3
(Scotland) Anne Kirk	4
(Switzerland) Nathalie Kallen	1
(Republic of Ireland) Maureen Kelly	4
(Austria) Marion Petschenig	0
(Russia) Olga Meyer	4
(France) Valere Gaudion	0
(England) Clare Bywaters	4
(Hungary) Adel Urgyan	0
(Wales) Jan Robbins	4
(England) Trina Gulliver	4
(Finland) Tarja Salminen	2
(Hungary) Nora Fekete	1
(Italy) Mojca Humar	4
(Wales) Chris Savvery	4
(Belgium) Christiane Soudan	0
(Scotland) Louise Hepburn	4
(Denmark) Mona Lund	2
(Republic of Ireland) Nicola McKenna	4
(Sweden) Carina Ekberg	2
(Northern Ireland) Denise Cassidy	4
(Latvia) Ligita Vilks	0
(Estonia) Reili Roodla	0
(Germany) Heike Ernst	4
(Norway) Tone Eriksen-Wagner	0
(Russia) Anastasia Dobromyslova	4

3rd Round (best of 7 legs)
(Netherlands) Francis Hoenselaar	4
(Sweden) Maud Jansson	1
(Finland) Marika Juhola	4
(Scotland) Anne Kirk	3
(Republic of Ireland) Maureen Kelly	4
(Russia) Olga Meyer	1
(England) Clare Bywaters	3
(Wales) Jan Robbins	4
(England) Trina Gulliver	4
(Italy) Mojca Humar	2
(Wales) Chris Savvery	2
(Scotland) Louise Hepburn	4
(Republic of Ireland) Nicola McKenna	4
(Northern Ireland) Denise Cassidy	0
(Germany) Heike Ernst	4
(Russia) Anastasia Dobromyslova	3

Quarter-finals (best of 7 legs)
(Netherlands) Francis Hoenselaar	4
(Finland) Marika Juhola	0
(Republic of Ireland) Maureen Kelly	4
(Wales) Jan Robbins	2
(England) Trina Gulliver	4
(Scotland) Louise Hepburn	0
(Republic of Ireland) Nicola McKenna	2
(Germany) Heike Ernst	4

Semi-finals (best of 7 legs)
(Netherlands) Francis Hoenselaar	4
(Republic of Ireland) Maureen Kelly	0
(England) Trina Gulliver	4
(Germany) Heike Ernst	0

Final (best of 7 legs)
(Netherlands) Francis Hoenselaar	4
(England) Trina Gulliver	3

== Women's Pairs ==
Round Robin

Group A

Pos	Team	Pld	Win	Lose	LF	LA	+/-
1	(Netherlands) Karin Krappen (Netherlands) Francis Hoenselaar	4	4	0	16	5	+11
2	(Republic of Ireland) Nicola McKenna (Republic of Ireland) Maureen Kelly	4	3	1	14	6	+8
3	(Scotland) Anne Kirk (Scotland) Louise Hepburn	4	2	2	13	11	+2
4	(Estonia) Reili Roodla (Estonia) Triin Timmermann	4	1	3	6	12	-6
5	(Austria) Judith Walkner (Austria) Marion Petschenig	4	0	4	1	16	-15

- (Netherlands) Karin Krappen & Francis Hoenselaar 4 - 2 (Republic of Ireland) Nicola McKenna & Maureen Kelly
- (Netherlands) Karin Krappen & Francis Hoenselaar 4 - 3 (Scotland) Anne Kirk & Louise Hepburn
- (Netherlands) Karin Krappen & Francis Hoenselaar 4 - 0 (Estonia) Reili Roodla & Triin Timmermann
- (Netherlands) Karin Krappen & Francis Hoenselaar 4 - 0 (Austria) Judith Walkner & Marion Petschenig
- (Republic of Ireland) Nicola McKenna & Maureen Kelly 4 - 2 (Scotland) Anne Kirk & Louise Hepburn
- (Republic of Ireland) Nicola McKenna & Maureen Kelly 4 - 0 (Estonia) Reili Roodla & Triin Timmermann
- (Republic of Ireland) Nicola McKenna & Maureen Kelly 4 - 0 (Austria) Judith Walkner & Marion Petschenig
- (Scotland) Anne Kirk & Louise Hepburn 4 - 2 (Estonia) Reili Roodla & Triin Timmermann
- (Scotland) Anne Kirk & Louise Hepburn 4 - 1 (Austria) Judith Walkner & Marion Petschenig
- (Estonia) Reili Roodla & Triin Timmermann 4 - 0 (Austria) Judith Walkner & Marion Petschenig

Group B

Pos	Team	Pld	Win	Lose	LF	LA	+/-
1	(Northern Ireland) Denise Cassidy (Northern Ireland) Grace Crane	4	4	0	16	8	+8
2	(Wales) Jan Robbins (Wales) Chris Savvery	4	3	1	15	7	+8
3	(Hungary) Nora Fekete (Hungary) Adel Urgyan	4	2	2	12	10	+2
4	(Finland) Marika Juhola (Finland) Tarja Salminen	4	1	3	7	12	-5
5	(Switzerland) Nathalie Kallen (Switzerland) Barbara Guldimann	4	0	4	3	16	-13

- (Northern Ireland) Denise Cassidy & Grace Crane 4 - 3 (Wales) Jan Robbins & Chris Savvery
- (Northern Ireland) Denise Cassidy & Grace Crane 4 - 2 (Hungary) Nora Fekete & Adel Urgyan
- (Northern Ireland) Denise Cassidy & Grace Crane 4 - 2 (Finland) Marika Juhola & Tarja Salminen
- (Northern Ireland) Denise Cassidy & Grace Crane 4 - 1 (Switzerland) Nathalie Kallen & Barbara Guldimann
- (Wales) Jan Robbins & Chris Savvery 4 - 2 (Hungary) Nora Fekete & Adel Urgyan
- (Wales) Jan Robbins & Chris Savvery 4 - 1 (Finland) Marika Juhola & Tarja Salminen
- (Wales) Jan Robbins & Chris Savvery 4 - 0 (Switzerland) Nathalie Kallen & Barbara Guldimann
- (Hungary) Nora Fekete & Adel Urgyan 4 - 0 (Finland) Marika Juhola & Tarja Salminen
- (Hungary) Nora Fekete & Adel Urgyan 4 - 2 (Switzerland) Nathalie Kallen & Barbara Guldimann
- (Finland) Marika Juhola & Tarja Salminen 4 - 0 (Switzerland) Nathalie Kallen & Barbara Guldimann

Group C

Pos	Team	Pld	Win	Lose	LF	LA	+/-
1	(Sweden) Maud Jansson (Sweden) Carina Ekberg	4	3	1	14	8	+6
2	(Italy) Chiara Bassega (Italy) Mojca Humar	4	3	1	14	9	+5
3	(Russia) Olga Meyer (Russia) Anastasia Dobromyslova	4	3	1	14	10	+4
4	(France) Valere Gaudion (France) Laetitia Glemin	4	1	3	9	14	-5
5	(Belgium) Wendy Beutels (Belgium) Christiane Soudan	4	0	4	4	16	-12

- (Sweden) Maud Jansson & Carina Ekberg 4 - 1 (Italy) Chiara Bassega & Mojca Humar
- (Sweden) Maud Jansson & Carina Ekberg 4 - 0 (France) Valere Gaudion & Laetitia Glemin
- (Sweden) Maud Jansson & Carina Ekberg 4 - 0 (Belgium) Wendy Beutels & Christiane Soudan
- (Italy) Chiara Bassega & Mojca Humar 4 - 2 (Russia) Olga Meyer & Anastasia Dobromyslova
- (Italy) Chiara Bassega & Mojca Humar 4 - 3 (France) Valere Gaudion & Laetitia Glemin
- (Italy) Chiara Bassega & Mojca Humar 4 - 3 (Belgium) Wendy Beutels & Christiane Soudan
- (Russia) Olga Meyer & Anastasia Dobromyslova 4 - 2 (Sweden) Maud Jansson & Carina Ekberg
- (Russia) Olga Meyer & Anastasia Dobromyslova 4 - 1 (Belgium) Wendy Beutels & Christiane Soudan
- (France) Valere Gaudion & Laetitia Glemin 4 - 3 (Russia) Olga Meyer & Anastasia Dobromyslova
- (Belgium) Wendy Beutels & Christiane Soudan 4 - 2 (France) Valere Gaudion & Laetitia Glemin

Group D

Pos	Team	Pld	Win	Lose	LF	LA	+/-
1	(England) Trina Gulliver (England) Clare Bywaters	4	4	0	16	1	+15
2	(Denmark) Mona Lund (Denmark) Janni Larsen	4	3	1	12	9	+3
3	(Norway) Hege Løkken (Norway) Tone Eriksen-Wagner	4	2	2	11	12	-1
4	(Germany) Beatrix Krockel (Germany) Heike Ernst	4	1	3	9	15	-6
5	(Latvia) Inita Bite (Latvia) Ligita Vilks	4	0	4	5	16	-11

- (England) Trina Gulliver & Clare Bywaters 4 - 0 (Denmark) Mona Lund & Janni Larsen
- (England) Trina Gulliver & Clare Bywaters 4 - 1 (Norway) Hege Løkken & Tone Eriksen-Wagner
- (England) Trina Gulliver & Clare Bywaters 4 - 0 (Germany) Beatrix Krockel & Heike Ernst
- (England) Trina Gulliver & Clare Bywaters 4 - 0 (Latvia) Inita Bite & Ligita Vilks
- (Denmark) Mona Lund & Janni Larsen 4 - 2 (Norway) Hege Løkken & Tone Eriksen-Wagner
- (Denmark) Mona Lund & Janni Larsen 4 - 2 (Germany) Beatrix Krockel & Heike Ernst
- (Denmark) Mona Lund & Janni Larsen 4 - 1 (Latvia) Inita Bite & Ligita Vilks
- (Norway) Hege Løkken & Tone Eriksen-Wagner 4 - 3 (Germany) Beatrix Krockel & Heike Ernst
- (Norway) Hege Løkken & Tone Eriksen-Wagner 4 - 1 (Latvia) Inita Bite & Ligita Vilks
- (Germany) Beatrix Krockel & Heike Ernst 4 - 3 (Latvia) Inita Bite & Ligita Vilks

Knock Out

Quarter-finals (best of 7 legs)
A1	(Netherlands) Karin Krappen (Netherlands) Francis Hoenselaar	4
D2	(Denmark) Mona Lund (Denmark) Janni Larsen	1
B1	(Northern Ireland) Denise Cassidy (Northern Ireland) Grace Crane	4
C2	(Italy) Chiara Bassega (Italy) Mojca Humar	3
C1	(Sweden) Maud Jansson (Sweden) Carina Ekberg	2
A2	(Wales) Jan Robbins (Wales) Chris Savvery	4
D1	(England) Trina Gulliver (England) Clare Bywaters	4
B2	(Republic of Ireland) Nicola McKenna (Republic of Ireland) Maureen Kelly	1

Semi-finals (best of 7 legs)
A1	(Netherlands) Karin Krappen (Netherlands) Francis Hoenselaar	4
B1	(Northern Ireland) Denise Cassidy (Northern Ireland) Grace Crane	1
A2	(Wales) Jan Robbins (Wales) Chris Savvery	0
D1	(England) Trina Gulliver (England) Clare Bywaters	4

Final (best of 7 legs)
A1	(Netherlands) Karin Krappen (Netherlands) Francis Hoenselaar	2
A2	(England) Trina Gulliver (England) Clare Bywaters	4
