= 2015 Denmark Open darts =

Denmark Open

Tournament information
- Dates: 2–3 May 2015
- Venue: Sport & Event Park Esbjerg
- Location: Esbjerg
- Country: Denmark
- Organisation(s): BDO, WDF, DDU
- Winner's share: 30,000 DKK

Champion(s)
- (England) Glen Durrant

2015 Denmark Open is a darts tournament, which took place in Esbjerg, Denmark in 2015.

== Results ==
=== Last 64 ===
Round	Player
Last 32	(England) Dave Smith
Last 32	(Netherlands) Willem Mandigers
Last 32	(England) Martin Atkins
Last 32	(Netherlands) Richard Veenstra
Last 32	(Denmark) Klaus Reinhold
Last 32	(Germany) Michel Helder
Last 32	(Denmark) Alex Brian Jensen
Last 32	(Denmark) Anders Zaar
Last 32	(England) Andrew Rose
Last 32	(Denmark) Nicolai Olsen
Last 32	(Denmark) Niels Jørgen Hansen
Last 32	(Wales) Richie Edwards
Last 32	(Denmark) Mogens Christensen
Last 32	(Denmark) Vladimir Andersen
Last 32	(England) Thomas Chant
Last 32	(Sweden) Markus Korhonen
Last 64	(Denmark) Brian Løkken
Last 64	(Netherlands) Frans Borsten
Last 64	(Denmark) Per Laursen
Last 64	(Denmark) Justin Thurley
Last 64	(Netherlands) Mark Brouwers
Last 64	(Denmark) Ivan Madsen
Last 64	(Denmark) Brian Buur
Last 64	(Netherlands) Co Stompé
Last 64	(Denmark) Tonny Madsen
Last 64	(Wales) Dean Reynolds
Last 64	(Denmark) Jimmy Poulsen
Last 64	(Denmark) Bjarne Iversen
Last 64	(Germany) Daniel Vogt
Last 64	(Denmark) Finn Madsen
Last 64	(Denmark) Frede Johansen
Last 64	(Denmark) Jan Christensen
Last 64	(Denmark) Jan Hansen
Last 64	(Denmark) Lars Andersen
Last 64	(Denmark) Mikael Sørensen
Last 64	(Denmark) Morten Steenholdt
Last 64	(Denmark) Per Bertelsen
Last 64	(Denmark) Rene Johansen
Last 64	(Denmark) Rene Madsen
Last 64	(Denmark) Søren Hedegaard
Last 64	(Denmark) Steffen Olling
Last 64	(Denmark) Stig Jørgensen
Last 64	(Denmark) Torben Dollerup
Last 64	(Denmark) Torben Laursen
Last 64	(Latvia) Madars Razma
Last 64	(Denmark) Lars Helsinghof
Last 64	(Wales) Jim Williams
Last 64	(England) Sam Hewson

=== Last 16 ===
Final 16
(England)	Glen Durrant
(Netherlands)	Michel van der Horst
(Netherlands)	Patrick Morelissen
(England)	Tony O'Shea
(England)	Darryl Fitton
(Belgium)	Stefaan de Prez
(Netherlands)	Jeffrey de Graaf
(Lithuania)	Darius Labanauskas
(England)	Pip Blackwell
(Netherlands)	Ryan de Vreede
(Belgium)	Geert De Vos
(England)	Matt Dicken
(England)	Jamie Hughes
(England)	James Hurrell
(England)	Gary Robson
(England)	Tony Martin

Quarter-finals
(England)	Glen Durrant	4
(Netherlands)	Patrick Morelissen	1
(England)	Darryl Fitton	4
(Netherlands)	Jeffrey de Graaf	2
(England)	Pip Blackwell	4
(Belgium)	Geert De Vos	3
(England)	Jamie Hughes	4
(England)	Gary Robson	0

Semi-finals
(England)	Glen Durrant	5
(England)	Darryl Fitton	2
(England)	Pip Blackwell	5
(England)	Jamie Hughes	4

Final
(England)	Glen Durrant	6
(England)	Pip Blackwell	1
