= 2010 Denmark Open darts =

Denmark Open

Tournament information
- Dates: 2010
- Country: Denmark
- Organisation(s): BDO, WDF, DDU
- Winner's share: 10,000 DKK

Champion(s)
- (England) Clive Barden

2010 Denmark Open is a darts tournament, which took place in Denmark in 2010.

== Results ==
=== Last 32 ===
Round	Player
Winner	(England) Clive Barden
Final	(Denmark) Preben Krabben
Semi-finals	(Denmark) Vladimir Andersen
Semi-finals	(Denmark) Ivan Madsen
Quarter-finals	(Denmark) Søren Behrendsen
Quarter-finals	(Denmark) Stig Jørgensen
Quarter-finals	(Norway) Erik Larsen
Quarter-finals	(Denmark) Robert Jakobsen
Last 16	(Denmark) Bo Munk
Last 16	(Denmark) Dennis Lindskjold
Last 16	(Denmark) Henrik Primdal
Last 16	(Denmark) Niels Jørgen Hansen
Last 16	(Denmark) Kristian Svenningsen
Last 16	(Denmark) Gert Sørensen
Last 16	(Denmark) Kasper Hansen
Last 16	(Denmark) Glenn Honore
Last 32	(Denmark) Jan-Ole Gjog
Last 32	(Sweden) Andree Bomander
Last 32	(Denmark) Torben Andersen
Last 32	(Denmark) Klaus Rejnhold
Last 32	(Netherlands) Santino Broer
Last 32	(England) Jake Jones
Last 32	(Netherlands) Rob Radsma
Last 32	(Sweden) Oskar Lukasiak
Last 32	(Denmark) Brian Nymark
Last 32	(Sweden) Tony Andersson
Last 32	(Sweden) Peter Alvesparr
Last 32	(Denmark) Brian Løkken
Last 32	(Denmark) Ivan Larsen
Last 32	(Denmark) Michael Larsen
Last 32	(England) Michael Cooney
Last 32	(Sweden) Joakim Kulan
