= 2016 Danish Darts Challenge =

Tournament information
- Dates: 7 February – 13 March 2016
- Location: Odense
- Country: Denmark
- Established: 2016
- Organization(s): Danish Darts Organization

Champion(s)
- Dennis Lindskjold

The 2016 Danish Darts Challenge was a darts tournament organised by the Danish Darts Organization. The ran from 7 February to 13 March 2016 in Odense. Dennis Lindskjold won the tournament in the final against Per Skau.

== Competitors ==
- Dennis Lindskjold
- Per Skau
- Niels-Jørgen Hansen
- Mogens Christensen
- Stig Jørgensen
- Frede Johansen

== Results ==
=== 7 February (Round 1) ===
	Score	
Frede Johansen; 68.32	5–5	Mogens Christensen; 69.40
Per Skau; 81.75	6–2	Dennis Lindskjold; 72.44
Stig Jørgensen; 73.59	5-5	Niels-Jørgen Hansen; 69.11
Frede Johansen; 77.10	3-6	Per Skau; 80.24
Mogens Christensen; 74.03	6–2	Stig Jørgensen; 73.63
Highest Checkout: Per Skau 114
Most 180s: Per Skau & Niels-Jørgen Hansen 2
Night's 180s: 6

=== 21 February (Round 2) ===
	Score	
Dennis Lindskjold; 83.51	6–4	Niels-Jørgen Hansen; 78.25
Per Skau; 85.87	6–3	Mogens Christensen; 77.37
Stig Jørgensen; 70.37	2-6	Dennis Lindskjold; 78.28
Frede Johansen; 71.26	2-6	Niels-Jørgen Hansen; 79.20
Per Skau; 72.73	6–0	Stig Jørgensen; 66.38
Highest Checkout: Niels-Jørgen Hansen 118
Most 180s: Dennis Lindskjold 4
Night's 180s: 8

=== 28 February (Round 3) ===
	Score	
Mogens Christensen; 78.86	6–2	Niels-Jørgen Hansen; 78.60
Frede Johansen; 81.59	3-6	Dennis Lindskjold; 84.94
Per Skau; 83.41	3-6	Niels-Jørgen Hansen; 88.33
Frede Johansen; 86.51	6-1	Stig Jørgensen; 75.55
Mogens Christensen; 72.46	6–4	Dennis Lindskjold; 75.91
Highest Checkout: Mogens Christensen 99
Most 180s: Niels-Jørgen Hansen 5
Night's 180s: 12

== Table ==
Pos	Name	Pld	W	D	L	LF	LA	+/-	180s	Pts
1	(Denmark) Per Skau	5	4	0	1	27	14	+13	4	12
2	(Denmark) Mogens Christensen	5	3	1	1	26	19	+7	4	10
3	(Denmark) Dennis Lindskjold	5	3	0	2	24	21	+3	7	9
4	(Denmark) Niels-Jørgen Hansen	5	2	1	2	24	22	+2	9	7
5	(Denmark) Frede Johansen	5	1	1	3	19	24	-5	1	4
6	(Denmark) Stig Jørgensen	5	0	1	4	10	29	-19	1	1

== Play-Offs (13 Marts) ==
	Score	
Semi-Finals (best of 13 legs)
Niels-Jørgen Hansen (Denmark); 83.22	4–7	(Denmark) Per Skau; 89.50
Dennis Lindskjold (Denmark); 90.01	7–2	(Denmark) Mogens Christensen; 84.77
Final (best of 17 legs)
Per Skau (Denmark); 85.86	6–9	(Denmark) Dennis Lindskjold; 95.45
High Checkout: Dennis LIndskjold 153 (semi-final)
