= 2004 Denmark Open darts =

Denmark Open

Tournament information
- Dates: 2004
- Country: Denmark
- Organisation(s): BDO, WDF, DDU
- Winner's share: 10,000 DKK

Champion(s)
- (Scotland) Gary Anderson

2004 Denmark Open is a darts tournament, which took place in Denmark in 2004.

== Results ==
Round	Player
Winner	(Scotland) Gary Anderson
Final	(Scotland) Mike Veitch
Semi-finals	(Denmark) Dennis Lindskjold
Semi-finals	(England) Tony Martin
Quarter-finals	(Denmark) Per Laursen
Quarter-finals	(Sweden) Daniel Larsson
Quarter-finals	(Netherlands) Raymond van Barneveld
Quarter-finals	(Germany) Carsten Hoffmann
Last 16	(England) Martin Adams
Last 16	(Netherlands) Co Stompe
Last 16	(Australia) Simon Whitlock
Last 16	(England) Tony West
Last 16	(England) Shaun Greatbatch
Last 16	(England) Tony Eccles
Last 16	(Gibraltar) Tony Dawkins
Last 16	(Norway) Robert Wagner
