= 2012 Denmark Open darts =

Denmark Open

Tournament information
- Dates: 2012
- Country: Denmark
- Organisation(s): BDO, WDF, DDU
- Winner's share: 20,000 DKK

Champion(s)
- (England) Paul Jennings

2012 Denmark Open is a darts tournament, which took place in Denmark in 2012.

== Results ==
=== Last 32 ===
Round	Player
Winner	(England) Paul Jennings
Final	(Norway) Robert Wagner
Semi-finals	(Denmark) Vladimir Andersen
Semi-finals	(Denmark) Mogens Christensen
Quarter-finals	(Germany) Andreas zum Felde
Quarter-finals	(Denmark) Glenn Honore
Quarter-finals	(Belgium) Davyd Venken
Quarter-finals	(Denmark) Stig Jørgensen
Last 16	(Denmark) Søren Hedegaard
Last 16	(Denmark) Bjarne Iversen
Last 16	(Denmark) Kim Frithjof
Last 16	(Denmark) Niels Heinsø
Last 16	(Denmark) Anders Zaar
Last 16	(Denmark) Peter Sønderby
Last 16	(Denmark) Brian Christiansen
Last 16	(Denmark) Jens Rene Antonsen
Last 32	(England) Kevin Hill
Last 32	(Denmark) Frede Johansen
Last 32	(Denmark) Finn Madsen
Last 32	(Denmark) Steen Lysen
Last 32	(Denmark) Henrik Rudolph
Last 32	(Denmark) Per Bertelsen
Last 32	(Denmark) Daniel Jensen
Last 32	(Denmark) Jan-Ole Gjog
Last 32	(Denmark) Kasper Puggaard
Last 32	(Denmark) Nicolai Rasmussen
Last 32	(Denmark) Jack Nielsen
Last 32	(Denmark) Rene Hoffensitz
Last 32	(Norway) Rune Lyngstad
Last 32	(Denmark) Dennis Møller
Last 32	(Denmark) Brian Mikkelsen
Last 32	(Denmark) Jan Nissen
