= 2005 WDF World Cup =

The 2005 WDF World Cup was the 15th edition of the WDF World Cup darts tournament, organised by the World Darts Federation. It was held in Perth, Australia.

== Men's singles ==
=== Preliminary round ===
- (Bermuda) Simon Carruthers 1–4 Warren Parry (New Zealand)
- (Australia) Graham Hunt 4–3 Steven Hickmott (Bermuda)
- (Bermuda) John Almeida 0–4 (United States) John Kuczynski
- (Bermuda) Vernon Daniels 2–4 (Denmark) Per Laursen
- (South Africa) Les Francis 4–0 (Barbados) Winston Cadogan
- (Barbados) Anthony Forde 1–4 (United States) Ray Carver
- (Barbados) Rodger Edwards 2–4 (Canada) Danny MacInnis
- (England) Tony O'Shea 4–0 (Barbados) Mark Griffith

=== Knockout stage ===
Second round
(Netherlands)	Dick van Dijk	4
(Australia)	Graham Hunt	1
(The Bahamas)	Harry Brown	4
(Turks and Caicos Islands)	Sidney Garland	0
(Canada)	Danny MacInnis	4
(Japan)	Hiroshi Watanobe	2
(South Africa)	Les Francis	3
(Sweden)	Markus Korhonen	4
(Republic of Ireland)	Martin McCloskey	3
(United States)	Ray Carver	4
(Norway)	Stian Lyngfeldt	4
(New Zealand)	Warren Parry	2
(England)	Andy Fordham	4
(Scotland)	Paul Hanvidge	2
(Switzerland)	Felix Degen	1
(Italy)	Loris Polese	4
(Wales)	Martin Phillips	3
(United States)	John Kuczynski	4
(Malaysia)	Amin Abdul Ghani	2
(South Africa)	Clifford Stradling	4
(Norway)	Robert Wagner	1
(Belgium)	Dirk Hespeels	4
(Sweden)	Göran Klemme	4
(Australia)	Anthony Fleet	2
(The Bahamas)	Barry Payne	4
(Singapore)	Alexis Lim Keng Leng	3
(England)	Tony O'Shea	2
(Republic of Ireland)	Aodhagan O'Neill	4
(Brazil)	Mauricio Maia	4
(Russia)	Alexei Juravlev	0
(Netherlands)	Vincent van der Voort	2
(Finland)	Kim Viljanen	4
(England)	Martin Adams	4
(Netherlands)	Niels de Ruiter	2
(Italy)	Pasquale Giustra	4
(Philippines)	Rey Sevilla	3
(Finland)	Ulf Ceder	4
(Brazil)	Artur Valle	0
(France)	Cyril Blot	4
(Republic of Ireland)	Luke Nolan	3
(Denmark)	Per Laursen	4
(Singapore)	Kamarudin Ahmad	1
(United States)	Pat Cooke	2
(Scotland)	Gary Anderson	4
(Belgium)	John Snyers	4
(Canada)	Jerry Hull	0
(New Zealand)	Wayne Carey	2
(Japan)	Daisuke Takeyama	4
(Finland)	Jarkko Komula	4
(Sweden)	Daniel Larsson	2
(Republic of Ireland)	Benny Grace	0
(England)	Mervyn King	4
(Netherlands)	Raymond van Barneveld	4
(Malaysia)	Selbaraju Subramaniam	1
(Germany)	Andree Welge	4
(Wales)	Phil Evans	3
(New Zealand)	Bernie Smith	4
(France)	Christophe Gayral	0
(Australia)	Tony David	2
(Italy)	Marco Apollonio	4
(Scotland)	Mike Veitch	3
(Denmark)	Brian Sorensen	4
(Philippines)	Rolando Andrade	3
(Northern Ireland)	Paul Watton	4

Third round
(Netherlands)	Dick van Dijk	4
(The Bahamas)	Harry Brown	3
(Canada)	Danny MacInnis	1
(Sweden)	Markus Korhonen	4
(United States)	Ray Carver	4
(Norway)	Stian Lyngfeldt	1
(England)	Andy Fordham	4
(Italy)	Loris Polese	1
(United States)	John Kuczynski	4
(South Africa)	Clifford Stradling	0
(Belgium)	Dirk Hespeels	0
(Sweden)	Göran Klemme	4
(The Bahamas)	Barry Payne	0
(Republic of Ireland)	Aodhagan O'Neill	4
(Brazil)	Mauricio Maia	4
(Finland)	Kim Viljanen	3
(England)	Martin Adams	4
(Italy)	Pasquale Giustra	3
(Finland)	Ulf Ceder	4
(France)	Cyril Blot	1
(Denmark)	Per Laursen	4
(Scotland)	Gary Anderson	1
(Belgium)	John Snyers	1
(Japan)	Daisuke Takeyama	4
(Finland)	Jarkko Komula	1
(England)	Mervyn King	4
(Netherlands)	Raymond van Barneveld	4
(Germany)	Andree Welge	2
(New Zealand)	Bernie Smith	3
(Italy)	Marco Apollonio	4
(Denmark)	Brian Sorensen	4
(Northern Ireland)	Paul Watton	0

Fourth round
(Netherlands)	Dick van Dijk	4
(Sweden)	Markus Korhonen	2
(United States)	Ray Carver	2
(England)	Andy Fordham	4
(United States)	John Kuczynski	4
(Sweden)	Göran Klemme	2
(Republic of Ireland)	Aodhagan O'Neill	3
(Brazil)	Mauricio Maia	4
(England)	Martin Adams	1
(Finland)	Ulf Ceder	4
(Denmark)	Per Laursen	4
(Japan)	Daisuke Takeyama	0
(England)	Mervyn King	4
(Netherlands)	Raymond van Barneveld	2
(Italy)	Marco Apollonio	3
(Denmark)	Brian Sorensen	4

Quarter-finals
(Netherlands)	Dick van Dijk	4
(England)	Andy Fordham	1
(United States)	John Kuczynski	2
(Brazil)	Mauricio Maia	4
(Finland)	Ulf Ceder	3
(Denmark)	Per Laursen	4
(England)	Mervyn King	4
(Denmark)	Brian Sorensen	1

Semi-finals
(Netherlands)	Dick van Dijk	4
(Brazil)	Mauricio Maia	1
(Denmark)	Per Laursen	4
(England)	Mervyn King	3

Final
(Netherlands)	Dick van Dijk	4
(Denmark)	Per Laursen	1

== Women's singles ==
Quarter-finals
(England)	Trina Gulliver	4
(Japan)	Yukari Nishikawa	1
(Finland)	Tarja Salminen	3
(Germany)	Heike Ernst	4
(Japan)	Mayumi Ouchi	4
(United States)	Marilyn Popp	3
(England)	Clare Bywaters	4
(Canada)	Robin Curry	1

Semi-finals
(England)	Trina Gulliver	4
(Germany)	Heike Ernst	2
(Japan)	Mayumi Ouchi	0
(England)	Clare Bywaters	4

Final
(England)	Trina Gulliver	3
(England)	Clare Bywaters	4

== Other Winners ==
Event	Winner	Score	Runner-up
Men's Team	(Finland) Jarkko Komula; Ulf Ceder; Marko Pusa; Kim Viljanen	9-8	(Australia) Simon Whitlock; Tony David; Graham Hunt; Anthony Fleet
Men's Pairs	(Netherlands) Vincent van der Voort; Raymond van Barneveld	4-1	(Denmark) Per Laursen; Brian Sorensen
Women's Pairs	(England) Trina Gulliver; Clare Bywaters	4-3	(United States) Marilyn Popp; Stacy Bromberg
Youth Singles - Boys	(Netherlands) Jonny Nijs	3-1	(England) Ross Smith
Youth Singles - Girls	(Netherlands) Carla Molema	3-2	(South Africa) Tanya Thomas
Youth Pairs	(Netherlands) Jonny Nijs; Carla Molema	3-2	(South Africa) Roman Ariefdien; Tanya Thomas

== Final Points Tables ==
=== Men ===
Ranking	Team	Points
1	Netherlands	103
2	Finland	83
3	England	74
4	Australia	69
5	Denmark	68

=== Women ===
Ranking	Team	Points
1	England	66
2	United States	29
3	Japan	20
4	Canada	18
4	Germany	18

=== Youth ===
Ranking	Team	Points
1	Netherlands	78
2	England	45
3	South Africa	44
4	Germany	29
5	Sweden	28
