= 1999 Denmark Open darts =

Denmark Open

Tournament information
- Dates: 1999
- Country: Denmark
- Organisation(s): BDO, WDF, DDU

Champion(s)
- (Scotland) Peter Johnstone

1999 Denmark Open is a professional dart's tournament, which took place in Denmark in 1999.

== Results ==
Round	Player
Winner	(Scotland) Peter Johnstone
Final	(England) Denis Ovens
Semi-finals	(Denmark) Stig Jørgensen
Semi-finals	(Denmark) Frede Johansen
Quarter-finals	(England) Matt Clark
Quarter-finals	(England) Ronnie Baxter
Quarter-finals	(Austria) Franz Thaler
Quarter-finals	(Denmark) Troels Rusel
Last 16	(England) Bob Anderson
Last 16	(England) Rod Harrington
Last 16	(England) Peter Manley
Last 16	(England) Peter Evison
Last 16	(England) Keith Deller
Last 16	(England) Dennis Priestley
Last 16	(England) Steve Coote
Last 16	(Netherlands) Roland Scholten
