= 2005 Denmark Open darts =

Denmark Open

Tournament information
- Dates: 2005
- Country: Denmark
- Organisation(s): BDO, WDF, DDU

Champion(s)
- (England) Shaun Greatbatch

2005 Denmark Open is a darts tournament, which took place in Denmark in 2005.

== Results ==
=== Last 16 ===
Round	Player
Winner	(England) Shaun Greatbatch
Final	(England) Tony Eccles
Semi-finals	(Sweden) Veikko Holmkvist
Semi-finals	(England) Ted Hankey
Quarter-finals	(Netherlands) Joey ten Berge
Quarter-finals	(England) Denis Ovens
Quarter-finals	(England) John Walton
Quarter-finals	(Sweden) Stefan Nagy
Last 16	(Finland) Marko Kantele
Last 16	(Netherlands) Co Stompé
Last 16	(Denmark) Dennis Lindskjold
Last 16	(Denmark) Ole Jørgensen
Last 16	(Netherlands) Albertino Essers
Last 16	(England) Tony West
Last 16	(Denmark) Brian Buur
Last 16	(Denmark) Per Laursen
