= 2019 Danish Darts Open =

Tournament information
- Dates: 14–16 June 2019
- Venue: Brøndbyhallen
- Location: Copenhagen
- Country: Denmark
- Organisation(s): PDC
- Format: Legs
- Prize fund: £140,000
- Winner's share: £25,000
- High checkout: 161 (England) James Wade (Wales) Jonny Clayton

Champion(s)
- (England) Dave Chisnall

The 2019 Danish Darts Open was the eighth of thirteen PDC European Tour events on the 2019 PDC Pro Tour. The tournament took place at Brøndbyhallen, Copenhagen, Denmark, from 14–16 June 2019. It featured a field of 48 players and £140,000 in prize money, with £25,000 going to the winner.

Mensur Suljović was the defending champion after defeating Simon Whitlock 8–3 in the final of the 2018 tournament, but he lost 6–5 to Dave Chisnall in the third round.

Chisnall would go on to win the event, his second European Tour title and his first for 6 years, by defeating Chris Dobey 8–3 in the final.

== Prize money ==
This is how the prize money is divided:

| Stage (num. of players) | | Prize money |
|---|---|---|
| Winner | (1) | £25,000 |
| Runner-up | (1) | £10,000 |
| Semi-finalists | (2) | £6,500 |
| Quarter-finalists | (4) | £5,000 |
| Third round losers | (8) | £3,000 |
| Second round losers | (16) | £2,000* |
| First round losers | (16) | £1,000 |
| Total | £140,000 | |

- Seeded players who lose in the second round do not receive this prize money on any Orders of Merit.

== Qualification and format ==
The top 16 entrants from the PDC ProTour Order of Merit on 7 May will automatically qualify for the event and will be seeded in the second round.

The remaining 32 places will go to players from six qualifying events – 18 from the UK Tour Card Holder Qualifier (held on 17 May), six from the European Tour Card Holder Qualifier (held on 17 May), two from the West & South European Associate Member Qualifier (held on 18 May), two from the Host Nation Qualifier (held on 13 June), two from the Nordic & Baltic Qualifier (excluding Danish players, held on 10 March), one from the East European Qualifier (held on 10 March), and one to the highest ranked PDCNB player on the PDC Order of Merit without a Tour Card.

From 2019, the Host Nation, Nordic & Baltic and East European Qualifiers will only be available to non-Tour Card holders. Any Tour Card holders from the applicable regions will have to play the main European Qualifier.

The following players will take part in the tournament:

Top 16

1. (England) Ian White (third round)
2. (Northern Ireland) Daryl Gurney (third round)
3. (Wales) Gerwyn Price (semi-finals)
4. (England) James Wade (third round)
5. (England) Adrian Lewis (third round)
6. (Scotland) Peter Wright (third round)
7. (England) Rob Cross (second round)
8. (Austria) Mensur Suljović (third round)
9. (England) Dave Chisnall (champion)
10. (England) Ricky Evans (second round)
11. (England) Joe Cullen (quarter-finals)
12. (Australia) Simon Whitlock (quarter-finals)
13. (Wales) Jonny Clayton (semi-finals)
14. (England) Stephen Bunting (third round)
15. (England) Darren Webster (second round)
16. (Netherlands) Jermaine Wattimena (quarter-finals)

UK Qualifier
- (England) Steve Beaton (first round)
- (England) Michael Smith (second round)
- (England) Nathan Aspinall (second round)
- (England) Mervyn King (first round)
- (England) Kirk Shepherd (third round)
- (England) Steve West (first round)
- (Northern Ireland) Kevin Burness (second round)
- (England) Chris Dobey (runner-up)
- (England) Reece Robinson (first round)
- (England) Mick Todd (first round)
- (England) Glen Durrant (first round)
- (England) Ryan Harrington (second round)
- (Republic of Ireland) William O'Connor (second round)
- (England) Luke Woodhouse (first round)
- (Australia) Kyle Anderson (second round)
- (England) Scott Taylor (first round)
- (Republic of Ireland) Steve Lennon (first round)
- (England) Ryan Joyce (second round)

European Qualifier
- (Germany) Martin Schindler (second round)
- (Poland) Krzysztof Ratajski (second round)
- (Spain) José Justicia (first round)
- (Portugal) José de Sousa (quarter-finals)
- (Germany) Gabriel Clemens (second round)
- (Netherlands) Vincent van der Voort (first round)

West/South European Qualifier
- (Belgium) Mike De Decker (first round)
- (New Zealand) Cody Harris (second round)

Host Nation Qualifier
- (Denmark) Per Laursen (second round)
- (Denmark) Niels-Jørgen Hansen (first round)

Nordic & Baltic Qualifier
- (Sweden) Dennis Nilsson (second round)
- (Finland) Teuvo Haverinen (first round)

Highest Ranked PDCNB Player on the PDC Order of Merit without a Tour Card
- (Finland) Kim Viljanen (first round)

East European Qualifier
- (Poland) Krzysztof Kciuk (first round)

== Draw ==
First round (best of 11 legs); 14 June
(Finland) Kim Viljanen 83.06 | 0
(Germany) Martin Schindler 85.08 | 6
(England) Steve Beaton 94.96 | 4
(England) Michael Smith 100.02 | 6
(Germany) Gabriel Clemens 95.16 | 6
(England) Mervyn King 89.82 | 3
(Poland) Krzysztof Kciuk 89.32 | 3
(Poland) Krzysztof Ratajski 92.21 | 6
(Belgium) Mike De Decker 90.03 | 2
(Australia) Kyle Anderson 94.03 | 6
(England) Mick Todd 88.86 | 3
(England) Nathan Aspinall 100.13 | 6
(Sweden) Dennis Nilsson 88.41 | 6
(Republic of Ireland) Steve Lennon 81.00 | 0
(Denmark) Per Laursen 85.43 | 6
(England) Reece Robinson 87.99 | 4
(Spain) José Justicia 82.32 | 2
(England) Ryan Joyce 88.81 | 6
(Portugal) José de Sousa 96.84 | 6
(England) Scott Taylor 88.06 | 3
(England) Kirk Shepherd 83.93 | 6
(Netherlands) Vincent van der Voort 83.58 | 5
(England) Steve West 87.29 | 3
(England) Chris Dobey 88.98 | 6
(England) Luke Woodhouse 90.74 | 3
(Republic of Ireland) William O'Connor 94.63 | 6
(England) Glen Durrant 97.59 | 5
(Northern Ireland) Kevin Burness 86.63 | 6
(Denmark) Niels-Jørgen Hansen 75.44 | 4
(England) Ryan Harrington 80.39 | 6
(New Zealand) Cody Harris 80.63 | 6
(Finland) Teuvo Haverinen 60.77 | 1

Second round (best of 11 legs); 15 June
1 | (England) Ian White 93.13 | 6
(Germany) Martin Schindler 94.65 | 5
16 | (Netherlands) Jermaine Wattimena 90.38 | 6
(England) Michael Smith 95.24 | 4
8 | (Austria) Mensur Suljović 90.71 | 6
(Germany) Gabriel Clemens 89.26 | 5
9 | (England) Dave Chisnall 98.90 | 6
(Poland) Krzysztof Ratajski 96.80 | 2
5 | (England) Adrian Lewis 85.76 | 6
(Australia) Kyle Anderson 88.83 | 4
12 | (Australia) Simon Whitlock 92.24 | 6
(England) Nathan Aspinall 93.47 | 4
4 | (England) James Wade 93.84 | 6
(Sweden) Dennis Nilsson 89.87 | 3
13 | (Wales) Jonny Clayton 97.71 | 6
(Denmark) Per Laursen 89.38 | 5
2 | (Northern Ireland) Daryl Gurney 100.90 | 6
(England) Ryan Joyce 91.24 | 1
15 | (England) Darren Webster 93.78 | 5
(Portugal) José de Sousa 93.61 | 6
7 | (England) Rob Cross 95.03 | 4
(England) Kirk Shepherd 92.66 | 6
10 | (England) Ricky Evans 94.45 | 5
(England) Chris Dobey 93.63 | 6
6 | (Scotland) Peter Wright 99.40 | 6
(Republic of Ireland) William O'Connor 84.98 | 2
11 | (England) Joe Cullen 91.34 | 6
(Northern Ireland) Kevin Burness 74.38 | 1
3 | (Wales) Gerwyn Price 100.42 | 6
(England) Ryan Harrington 97.73 | 4
14 | (England) Stephen Bunting 88.87 | 6
(New Zealand) Cody Harris 92.63 | 4

Third round (best of 11 legs); 16 June
1 | (England) White 94.41 | 4
16 | (Netherlands) Wattimena 97.15 | 6
8 | (Austria) Suljović 97.23 | 5
9 | (England) Chisnall 98.59 | 6
5 | (England) Lewis 86.75 | 3
12 | (Australia) Whitlock 89.96 | 6
4 | (England) Wade 101.64 | 2
13 | (Wales) Clayton 101.95 | 6
2 | (Northern Ireland) Gurney 97.31 | 2
(Portugal) de Sousa 100.63 | 6
(England) Shepherd 92.04 | 2
(England) Dobey 97.41 | 6
6 | (Scotland) Wright 93.64 | 4
11 | (England) Cullen 95.31 | 6
3 | (Wales) Price 99.43 | 6
14 | (England) Bunting 87.89 | 2

Quarter-finals (best of 11 legs); 16 June
16 | (Netherlands) Wattimena 90.47 | 1
9 | (England) Chisnall 95.07 | 6
12 | (Australia) Whitlock 92.88 | 1
13 | (Wales) Clayton 97.07 | 6
(Portugal) de Sousa 94.54 | 5
(England) Dobey 99.43 | 6
11 | (England) Cullen 93.60 | 1
3 | (Wales) Price 110.12 | 6

Semi-finals (best of 13 legs); 16 June
9 | (England) Chisnall 101.07 | 7
13 | (Wales) Clayton 95.72 | 6
(England) Dobey 94.06 | 7
3 | (Wales) Price 99.08 | 4

Final (best of 15 legs); 16 June
9 | (England) Chisnall 98.92 | 8
(England) Dobey 85.55 | 3
