= South African Masters (darts) =

Emperors Palace South African Masters

Tournament information
- Venue: Emperors Palace
- Location: Johannesburg
- Country: South Africa
- Established: 2007
- Organisation(s): PDC
- Format: Legs
- Prize fund: £15,000 (2009)
- Month(s) Played: September

Current champion(s)
- (England) Phil Taylor

The Emperors Palace South African Masters was a darts tournament organised by the Professional Darts Corporation which began in 2007, so-named because it took place at the Emperors Palace entertainment resort in Johannesburg, South Africa.

== Format and qualification ==
The tournament had 8 players, 4 of which were the top ranked players on the PDC Order of Merit and the semi-finalists, runner up and winner of the PDC South African Open which takes place the day before. The four players chosen by the PDC were drawn up against the qualifiers from the PDC South African Open in a knock-out tournament. In 2007, Phil Taylor, Raymond van Barneveld, James Wade and Terry Jenkins, ranked numbers one to four in the Order of Merit respectively at the time, participated in the tournament. In the following year, Taylor and Wade, returned to the tournament, being ranked numbers one and three in the world at the time. John Part, ranked number four in the world, also participated, as did Wayne Mardle, who replaced Barneveld (ranked second) due to the Dutchman's two month sabbatical from darts. Taylor, Wade, Part and Mervyn King took part in the 2009 tournament.

Matches were as follows:

- Quarter-final: best of 7 legs
- Semi-final: Best of 9 legs (formerly in 2007 best of 11 legs)
- Final: Best of 11 legs (formerly in 2007 best of 15 legs, in 2008 best of 9 legs)

Since the 2010 tournament, the event is the direct qualification tournament for the World Darts Championship for South African darts players.

== Television ==
The tournament was broadcast live on SuperSport in South Africa. In the United Kingdom, the tournament was broadcast on Challenge in 2007, Nuts TV in 2008, and Sky Sports in 2009.

== Results ==
=== 2007 ===
Quarter-finals; Best of 7 legs			Semi-finals; Best of 11 legs			Final; Best of 15 legs
(England)	Phil Taylor	4
(South Africa)	Mike Ryder	0	(England)	Phil Taylor	6
(England)	Terry Jenkins	4	(England)	Terry Jenkins	4
(South Africa)	Paul Meyer	0				(England)	Phil Taylor	8
(Netherlands)	Raymond van Barneveld	4				(Netherlands)	Raymond van Barneveld	6
(South Africa)	Charles Losper	1	(Netherlands)	Raymond van Barneveld	6
(England)	James Wade	4	(England)	James Wade	5
(South Africa)	Lodewyk Marais	0

=== 2008 ===
Quarter-finals; Best of 7 legs			Semi-finals; Best of 9 legs			Final; Best of 9 legs
(Canada)	John Part	4
(South Africa)	Mark Jackson	0	(Canada)	John Part	5
(England)	James Wade	4	(England)	James Wade	1
(South Africa)	Les Francis	1				(Canada)	John Part	2
(England)	Wayne Mardle	4				(England)	Phil Taylor	5
(South Africa)	Charles Losper	1	(England)	Wayne Mardle	2
(England)	Phil Taylor	4	(England)	Phil Taylor	5
(South Africa)	Shawn Hogan	1

=== 2009 ===
Quarter-finals; Best of 7 legs			Semi-finals; Best of 9 legs			Final; Best of 11 legs
(England)	Phil Taylor	4
(South Africa)	Christo Meiring	1	(England)	Phil Taylor	5
(Canada)	John Part	4	(Canada)	John Part	2
(South Africa)	Devon Petersen	1				(England)	Phil Taylor	6
(England)	James Wade	4				(England)	James Wade	4
(South Africa)	Wynand Havenga	1	(England)	James Wade	5
(England)	Mervyn King	4	(England)	Mervyn King	4
(South Africa)	Les Francis	1

- During the fifth leg of the semi-final between James Wade and Mervyn King, King hit the first ever televised nine-dart finish outside of Europe. He hit two consecutive 180s, and then used T20, T19, D12 to complete the perfect leg. King went 4–1 up as a result of that leg, but still lost the match 5–4.

== Previous winners ==
Year	Champion	Score	Runner-up	Total prize money	Winner's prize
2007	(England) Phil Taylor	8–6	(Netherlands) Raymond van Barneveld	£15,000	£5,000
2008	(England) Phil Taylor	5–2	(Canada) John Part	£15,000	£5,000
2009	(England) Phil Taylor	6–4	(England) James Wade	£15,000	£5,000

World Darts Championship Qualification Tournament

Year	Champion	Score	Runner-up	Semi-finalist 1 (lost to Champion)	Semi-finalist 2 (lost to Runner-Up)
2006	(South Africa) Wynand Havenga	4–1	(South Africa) Paul Meyer	(South Africa) Paul McMahon	(South Africa) Roshan Sivraman
2007	(South Africa) Charles Losper	4–0	(South Africa) Lodewyk Marais	(South Africa) Mike Ryder	(South Africa) Paul Meyer
2008	(South Africa) Charles Losper	4–1	(South Africa) Mark Jackson	(South Africa) Shawn Hogan	(South Africa) Les Francis
2009	(South Africa) Les Francis	4–3	(South Africa) Devon Petersen	(South Africa) Wynand Havenga	(South Africa) Christo Meiring
2010	(South Africa) Devon Petersen	5–4	(South Africa) Les Francis	(South Africa) Charles Losper	(South Africa) Jeff Waterman
2011	(South Africa) Devon Petersen	beat	(South Africa) Nolan Arendse	(South Africa) Brent Robertson	(South Africa) Gary Dowman
2012	(South Africa) Charl Pietersen	8–1	(South Africa) Charles Losper	(South Africa) Shawn Hogan	(South Africa) Jason Hendricks
2013	(South Africa) Devon Petersen	9–3	(South Africa) Graham Filby	(South Africa) Charles Losper	(South Africa) Charl Petersen
2014	(South Africa) Nolan Arendse	9–5	(South Africa) Devon Petersen	(South Africa) Shawn Hogan	(South Africa) Charl Pietersen
2015	(South Africa) Warrick Scheffer	9–2	(South Africa) Clifford Stradling	(South Africa) Charl Pietersen	(South Africa) Charles Losper
2021	(South Africa) Cameron Carolissen	9–8	(South Africa) Charles Losper	(South Africa) Carl Gabriel	(South Africa) Warrick Scheffer
2022	(South Africa) Stefan Vermaak	9–8	(South Africa) Charles Losper	(South Africa) Shawn Hogan	(South Africa) Cameron Carolissen
2023	(South Africa) Wynand Havenga	7–0	(South Africa) Deon Oliver	(South Africa) Charles Losper	(South Africa) Stefan Vermaak
2024	(South Africa) Simon Adams	12–10	(South Africa) Leslie Gouvea	(South Africa) Wynand Havenga	(South Africa) Deon Oliver
