= Rico Vonck =

Dutch darts player

Personal information
- Nickname: "Sparky"
- Born: 12 March 1987 (age 39) Roermond, Netherlands
- Home town: Posterholt, Netherlands

Sport
- Sport: Darts
- Laterality: Right-handed

Organisation (see split in darts)
- PDC: 2006–2008

PDC premier events – best performances
- World Championship: Last 16: 2007
- UK Open: Last 160: 2007

Rico Vonck (born 12 March 1987) is a Dutch former darts player.

== Career ==
Vonck qualified for the 2007 PDC World Darts Championship, having finished second in the Dutch Darts Federation (DDF) rankings. Michael van Gerwen had finished top of the list, but opted to play in the BDO version instead.

Vonck was only 19 years old when he won his place at the Circus Tavern. He won his first round match against world number 16 Mark Walsh, who was suffering from dartitis at the time. Vonck then went on to beat Canadian qualifier Brian Cyr in the second round but failed to win a single leg against fellow Dutchman and four-time World Champion Raymond van Barneveld in the last 16, losing 0–4.

== World Championship results ==
=== PDC ===
- 2007: Third round (lost to Raymond van Barneveld 0–4)

== Sources ==
- Rico Vonck's darts database
