= 2007 PDC World Darts Championship =

Tournament information
- Dates: 18 December 2006 – 1 January 2007
- Venue: Circus Tavern
- Location: Purfleet
- Country: England
- Organisation(s): PDC
- Format: Sets; Final – best of 13
- Prize fund: £500,000
- Winner's share: £100,000
- High checkout: 170 Raymond van Barneveld

Champion(s)
- Raymond van Barneveld

The 2007 PDC World Darts Championship (known for sponsorship reasons as the 2007 Ladbrokes.com World Darts Championship) was the fourteenth World Championship organised by the Professional Darts Corporation since it separated from the British Darts Organisation. The tournament took place between 18 December 2006 – 1 January 2007. The championship was once again held at the Circus Tavern in Purfleet, Essex, where it had been staged since the first PDC World Championship in 1994. However, it would turn out to be the last time the tournament would be held at the Tavern: in April 2007, the PDC announced that the event would be moving to Alexandra Palace from 2008.

This was the fifth year of Ladbrokes' sponsorship deal, with the tournament prize fund now at a record £500,000. The PDC had introduced a bonus for a nine-dart finish at the 2006 World Matchplay, which started at £5,000 and rolled over to the next Premier tour event if not won; for this tournament, the bonus stood at £15,000, as a nine-darter had not been achieved at the Matchplay or the World Grand Prix. The bonus was not won, so it rolled over again, to the 2007 UK Open.

Raymond van Barneveld became the first player in the history of the sport to play in the BDO World Championship final and the PDC World Championship final in consecutive years, having decided to switch organisations on 15 February 2006. Barneveld was close to defeat against top seed Colin Lloyd in the second round, but then never dropped another set on his way to the final, which was much anticipated between the best players of the current era. Barneveld and Phil Taylor had 17 World Championships between them and in one of the greatest matches in darts history, Barneveld came back from 3–0 down in sets to win 7–6 after a sudden-death leg. It was Barneveld's fifth world title overall.

Taylor maintained his record of reaching every single PDC World Championship final to date, but the defeat ended a 21-match unbeaten run at the Tavern, as well as his three-year reign as World Champion.

== Qualifiers ==
In addition to the top 32 ranked PDC players, 32 places were awarded to qualifiers. 16 players progressed from a Professional Dart Players Association (PDPA) qualifying event and 16 qualifiers were determined by the PDC in consultation with the PDPA. This involved various qualifying tournaments across the world in territories where television coverage of the PDC is broadcast, plus some wildcards awarded by international broadcasters and the PDC.

The full list of the 16 players who made it to the Circus Tavern as an International Qualifier are:

- (United States) Bill Davis – won a playoff of four American players in Las Vegas, Nevada
- (United States) John Kuczynski – best American player in World Series of Darts
- Warren French – won the New Zealand National Singles Championship
- (Australia) Mitchell Clegg – won Oceanic Masters
- (Australia) Tony Fleet – won the Australian Grand Prix
- (Canada) Brian Cyr
- (Canada) Ron Miller
- (Canada) Gerry Convery - Second-ranked Canadian
- (South Africa) Wynand Havenga – won South African Masters
- (Japan) Tetsuya Wada – won Japanese qualifying event
- (China) Shi Yongsheng – won Chinese qualifying event
- (Denmark) Per Laursen – won Danish qualifying event
- (Netherlands) Rico Vonck – via Dutch Darts Foundation (DDF) Rankings (finished second to Michael van Gerwen who opted to play in the BDO championship)
- (Netherlands) Josephus Schenk – SBS-6 Wildcard (third in DDF rankings)
- (Germany) Tomas Seyler – DSF Wildcard
- (Austria) Anton Pein – won a 128-man play off comprising German, Austrian and Swiss players

Mitchell Clegg, from New South Wales, Australia was the youngest ever qualifier for a World Darts Championship (BDO or PDC). In October 2006, he won the Oceanic Masters at the age of 15 to earn a place at the Circus Tavern in January. He celebrated his 16th birthday in November 2006. He lost to eventual champion Raymond van Barneveld in the 1st round – ironically both players were making their Circus Tavern debuts despite their vastly different levels of experience.

It is the only World Darts Championship to date (PDC, BDO or WDF) to not have a qualifier from Scotland.

== PDPA Qualifying tournament ==
172 players lined up at the Holte Suite, Villa Park, Birmingham for the qualifiers for the World Championship on 2 December 2006. They included four former World Champions, Eric Bristow, John Lowe, Richie Burnett and Keith Deller. Former World Matchplay winners Peter Evison and Rod Harrington also attempted to qualify alongside two-time World Grand Prix finalist Shayne Burgess and former World finalist, Dave Whitcombe

They were all faced with a minimum of three matches (4 for Evison and Burnett) to qualify. Harrington and Evison both went at the first hurdle. Bristow, Lowe and Deller all managed to win their first matches, but then all fell in their second games (Lowe 4–5 to Ian Branks, Bristow 0–5 to Dennis Smith and Deller 4–5 to Dave Ladley). Burgess and Whitcombe also fell two matches short of qualification.

Richie Burnett managed to win four qualifying rounds to qualify for the first round proper at the Circus Tavern. He was joined by Alan Green, Alan Tabern, Steve Smith, Wayne Atwood, Ian Branks, Adrian Gray, Martin Burchell, Colin Osborne, Darren Webster, Alan Caves, Dave Ladley, Gary Welding, Dave Jowett, Mick McGowan and Mark Lawrence.

The draw for the main tournament was made after the qualifiers were completed.

== Order of Merit ==
Order of Merit

1. (England) Colin Lloyd (second round)
2. (England) Phil Taylor (runner-up)
3. (England) Dennis Priestley (third round)
4. (Netherlands) Roland Scholten (third round)
5. (England) Adrian Lewis (third round)
6. (England) Terry Jenkins (quarter-finals)
7. (England) Peter Manley (second round)
8. (England) Wayne Mardle (first round)
9. (England) Denis Ovens (second round)
10. (England) Ronnie Baxter (first round)
11. (England) James Wade (third round)
12. (England) Kevin Painter (first round)
13. (England) Andy Jenkins (semi-finals)
14. (England) Mark Dudbridge (second round)
15. (England) Chris Mason (third round)
16. (England) Mark Walsh (first round)
17. (Wales) Barrie Bates (first round)
18. (Canada) John Part (second round)
19. (England) Andy Hamilton (semi-finals)
20. (England) Wes Newton (second round)
21. (England) Andy Smith (second round)
22. (England) Lionel Sams (first round)
23. (England) Bob Anderson (first round)
24. (England) Alan Warriner-Little (first round)
25. (England) Dave Askew (third round)
26. (England) Steve Maish (first round)
27. (England) Steve Beaton (second round)
28. (England) Wayne Jones (second round)
29. (England) Alex Roy (second round)
30. (England) Colin Monk (first round)
31. (England) Matt Clark (first round)
32. (Netherlands) Raymond van Barneveld (champion)

PDPA Qualifiers

1. (Wales) Richie Burnett (first round)
2. (England) Alan Green (first round)
3. (England) Alan Tabern (quarter-finals)
4. (England) Steve Smith (first round)
5. (Wales) Wayne Atwood (first round)
6. (Northern Ireland) Ian Branks (first round)
7. (England) Adrian Gray (second round)
8. (England) Martin Burchell (first round)
9. (England) Colin Osborne (quarter-finals)
10. (England) Darren Webster (quarter-finals)
11. (England) Alan Caves (second round)
12. (England) Dave Ladley (second round)
13. (England) Gary Welding (first round)
14. (England) Dave Jowett (first round)
15. (Republic of Ireland) Mick McGowan (second round)
16. (England) Mark Lawrence (first round)

International Qualifiers
- (United States) Bill Davis (first round)
- (United States) John Kuczynski (first round)
- (New Zealand) Warren French (first round)
- (Australia) Mitchell Clegg (first round)
- (Australia) Tony Fleet (first round)
- (Canada) Brian Cyr (second round)
- (Canada) Ron Miller (first round)
- (Canada) Gerry Convery (first round)
- (South Africa) Wynand Havenga (third round)
- (Japan) Tetsuya Wada (first round)
- (China) Shi Yongsheng (first round)
- (Denmark) Per Laursen (second round)
- (Germany) Tomas Seyler (first round)
- (Netherlands) Rico Vonck (third round)
- (Netherlands) Josephus Schenk (first round)
- (Austria) Anton Pein (first round)

== Prize money ==
The total prize fund for the 2007 World Championship was £500,000.

Position (num. of players)		Prize money (Total: £500,000)
Winner	(1)	£100,000
Runner-Up	(1)	£50,000
Semi-finalists	(2)	£20,000
Quarter-finalists	(4)	£12,500
Third round losers	(8)	£8,500
Second round losers	(16)	£5,000
First round losers	(32)	£3,500
Nine-dart finish	(0)	£15,000

== Draw ==
=== Finals ===
Quarter-finals (best of 9 sets); 29 December
32	(Netherlands) Raymond van Barneveld 96.31	5
(England) Alan Tabern 84.42	0
12	(England) Andy Jenkins 89.91	5
(England) Colin Osborne 90.09	4
2	(England) Phil Taylor 101.51	5
(England) Darren Webster 95.13	1
6	(England) Terry Jenkins 97.32	4
19	(England) Andy Hamilton 97.86	5

Semi-finals (best of 11 sets); 30 December
32	(Netherlands) Raymond van Barneveld 99.23	6
12	(England) Andy Jenkins 86.42	0
2	(England) Phil Taylor 105.90	6
19	(England) Andy Hamilton 90.96	0

Final (best of 13 sets); 1 January
32	(Netherlands) Raymond van Barneveld 100.93	7
2	(England) Phil Taylor 100.86	6

=== Rounds 1-4 ===
First round (best of 5 sets); 18–21 December
1	(England) Colin Lloyd 90.59	3
(Germany) Tomas Seyler 86.33	0
32	(Netherlands) Raymond van Barneveld 88.99	3
(Australia) Mitchell Clegg 77.26	0
16	(England) Mark Walsh 71.10	0
(Netherlands) Rico Vonck 87.15	3
17	(Wales) Barrie Bates 87.21	2
(Canada) Brian Cyr 86.86	3
8	(England) Wayne Mardle 89.31	2
(England) Alan Caves 83.11	3
25	(England) Dave Askew 82.73	3
(England) Martin Burchell 80.39	2
9	(England) Denis Ovens 84.55	3
(England) Steve Smith 73.67	0
24	(England) Alan Warriner-Little 77.14	0
(England) Alan Tabern 89.06	3
5	(England) Adrian Lewis 92.65	3
(Australia) Tony Fleet 76.50	0
28	(England) Wayne Jones 81.48	3
(Northern Ireland) Ian Branks 78.58	0
12	(England) Andy Jenkins 84.43	3
(United States) Bill Davis 81.72	1
21	(England) Andy Smith 75.99	3
(China) Shi Yongsheng 67.16	0
4	(Netherlands) Roland Scholten 89.89	3
(Canada) Ron Miller 65.31	0
29	(England) Alex Roy 85.21	3
(Wales) Richie Burnett 79.80	0
13	(England) Kevin Painter 89.96	1
(England) Colin Osborne 86.62	3
20	(England) Wes Newton 85.08	3
(Japan) Tetsuya Wada 73.29	0
2	(England) Phil Taylor 96.62	3
(Austria) Anton Pein 76.49	0
31	(England) Matt Clark 88.31	1
(Republic of Ireland) Mick McGowan 94.06	3
15	(England) Chris Mason 94.96	3
(Wales) Wayne Atwood 84.65	0
18	(Canada) John Part 86.56	3
(England) Alan Green 80.64	2
7	(England) Peter Manley 79.88	3
(England) Dave Jowett 77.29	0
26	(England) Steve Maish 89.19	2
(South Africa) Wynand Havenga 79.30	3
10	(England) Ronnie Baxter 90.09	2
(England) Adrian Gray 91.13	3
23	(England) Bob Anderson 74.68	1
(England) Darren Webster 88.28	3
6	(England) Terry Jenkins 88.75	3
(England) Mark Lawrence 85.92	1
27	(England) Steve Beaton 90.18	3
(Canada) Gerry Convery 81.04	0
11	(England) James Wade 81.45	3
(New Zealand) Warren French 78.60	1
22	(England) Lionel Sams 89.91	1
(England) Dave Ladley 85.53	3
3	(England) Dennis Priestley 91.12	3
(Netherlands) Josephus Schenk 74.99	0
30	(England) Colin Monk 84.19	0
(Denmark) Per Laursen 86.78	3
14	(England) Mark Dudbridge 86.82	3
(United States) John Kuczynski 82.68	1
19	(England) Andy Hamilton 88.11	3
(England) Gary Welding 85.18	0

Second round (best of 7 sets); 22–27 December
1	(England) Lloyd 91.18	3
32	(Netherlands) van Barneveld 96.13	4
(Netherlands) Vonck 78.47	4
(Canada) Cyr 77.15	2
(England) Caves 88.04	2
25	(England) Askew 85.16	4
9	(England) Ovens 91.92	3
(England) Tabern 89.73	4
5	(England) Lewis 96.46	4
28	(England) Jones 89.08	3
12	(England) A. Jenkins 84.44	4
21	(England) Smith 86.24	2
4	(Netherlands) Scholten 91.64	4
29	(England) Roy 88.51	3
(England) Osborne 90.32	4
20	(England) Newton 87.02	2
2	(England) Taylor 109.00	4
(Republic of Ireland) McGowan 101.82	1
15	(England) Mason 90.49	4
18	(Canada) Part 85.56	2
7	(England) Manley 81.83	3
(South Africa) Havenga 84.39	4
(England) Gray 78.69	1
(England) Webster 89.14	4
6	(England) T. Jenkins 91.33	4
27	(England) Beaton 85.64	3
11	(England) Wade 83.36	4
(England) Ladley 82.72	3
3	(England) Priestley 89.76	4
(Denmark) Laursen 89.35	3
14	(England) Dudbridge 93.52	3
19	(England) Hamilton 95.29	4

Third round (best of 7 sets); 27–28 December
32	(Netherlands) van Barneveld 102.48	4
(Netherlands) Vonck 79.65	0
25	(England) Askew 85.10	3
(England) Tabern 90.33	4
5	(England) Lewis 94.61	3
12	(England) A. Jenkins 93.60	4
4	(Netherlands) Scholten 87.19	2
(England) Osborne 93.77	4
2	(England) Taylor 99.34	4
15	(England) Mason 94.78	0
(South Africa) Havenga 86.43	2
(England) Webster 83.59	4
6	(England) T. Jenkins 89.42	4
11	(England) Wade 81.66	3
3	(England) Priestley 94.92	1
19	(England) Hamilton 98.73	4

Quarter-finals (best of 9 sets); 29 December
32	(Netherlands) van Barneveld 96.31	5
(England) Tabern 84.42	0
12	(England) A. Jenkins 89.91	5
(England) Osborne 90.09	4
2	(England) Taylor 101.51	5
(England) Webster 95.13	1
6	(England) T. Jenkins 97.32	4
19	(England) Hamilton 97.86	5

Scores after player's names are three-dart averages (total points scored divided by darts thrown and multiplied by 3)

== Statistics ==
- Highest three-dart checkout: 170 ( (Netherlands) Raymond van Barneveld, Final)
- Tournament 180s scored: 503 (in 1298 legs thrown)

=== Top 180 scorers ===
Rank	Player	180s
1	(Netherlands) Raymond van Barneveld	51
2	(England) Andy Hamilton	46
3	(England) Phil Taylor	28
4	(England) Colin Osborne	25
4	(England) Adrian Lewis	25
6	(England) Andy Jenkins	21
7	(England) Dennis Priestley	18
7	(England) Mark Dudbridge	18
7	(England) Terry Jenkins	18
7	(England) Alan Tabern	18

== Representation from different countries ==
This table shows the number of players by country in the World Championship.

	(England) ENG	(Netherlands) NED	(Wales) WAL	(Republic of Ireland) IRL	(Canada) CAN	(South Africa) RSA	(Germany) GER	(Australia) AUS	(New Zealand) NZL	(United States) USA	(China) CHN	(Austria) AUT	(Japan) JPN	(Denmark) DEN	Total
Final	1	1	0	0	0	0	0	0	0	0	0	0	0	0	2
Semis	3	1	0	0	0	0	0	0	0	0	0	0	0	0	4
Quarters	7	1	0	0	0	0	0	0	0	0	0	0	0	0	8
Round 3	12	3	0	0	0	1	0	0	0	0	0	0	0	0	16
Round 2	24	3	0	1	2	1	0	0	0	0	0	0	0	1	32
Round 1	41	4	3	1	4	1	1	2	1	2	1	1	1	1	64
Total	41	4	3	1	4	1	1	2	1	2	1	1	1	1	64

== Television coverage ==
The following television stations broadcast the 2007 PDC World Championships.

- Sky Sports in the UK
- SBS6 in the Netherlands
- Sports 1 in the Netherlands, Czech Republic and Hungary
- DSF in Germany
- Supersport in South Africa
- Ten Sports in India (quarter finals onwards)

The UK television ratings for the World Championship included the following highlights

409,000 viewers Thursday 28 December (Taylor v Mason QF) 6th highest rated programme on Sky Sports 1 that week.
354,000 viewers Saturday 30 December (semi-finals) highest rated programme on Sky Sports 2 that week.

The viewing figures for the final were 1,028,000. The Newcastle United v Manchester United game which immediately preceded the darts on Sky Sports 1 achieved viewing figures of 1,761,000 – (also known as the "lead-in" audience for the darts).

Dutch television audience

1,339,000 viewers watched the final on Monday 1 January on the Dutch SBS6 channel

== Tournament review ==
- Day One – Monday 18 December

Phil Taylor opened the defence of his title with a comfortable 3–0 victory over Austrian qualifier Anton Pein, without dropping a single leg during the match and only allowing Pein three darts on a double in the final leg of the final set. Number seven seed Peter Manley also had little trouble in despatching Dave Jowett with the loss of only one leg.

The big upset came when Ronnie Baxter, twice a finalist in the BDO World Championship went out in the first round for the second year running. He lost 2–3 to 25-year-old Sussex player, Adrian Gray who was never behind in the entire match.

Former World Champion John Part struggled through to the second round against Merseyside debutant Alan Green 3–2, when the final set went right down to the wire. The Canadian only just avoided going down to a tie-break leg clinching the final set 6 legs to 4. Wynand Havenga, the first ever South African at the PDC World Darts Championship reached the second round by eliminating 26th seed Steve Maish.

Elsewhere, 6th seed Terry Jenkins dispatched Mark Lawrence 3–1, Mick McGowan defeated 31st seed Matt Clark who produced the highest checkout of the tournament thus far with a 161 finish, and Chris Mason cruised through against Wayne Atwood 3–0.

- Day Two – Tuesday 19 December

The afternoon session provided a series of shocks as three of the four seeded players in action were toppled. Bob Anderson lost to 38-year-old Darren Webster, from Norfolk 1–3. Anderson was always in trouble, having dropped the first five legs of the match. The Limestone Cowboy had been struggling with a trapped nerve in his neck, but battled back to win the third set, but Webster closed out the match with two 14-dart legs.

Canadian debutant, Bryan Cyr put out Barrie Bates, who had been an in-form player in 2006. Cyr took the first two sets before Bates fought back to level, but Cyr was strongest on the doubles to clinch the final set. Dutch teenager, Rico Vonck had earlier defeated world number 16 Mark Walsh, who it seemed may be struggling with dartitis.

The evening session went more in favour of the seeds as world number 1, Colin Lloyd defeated Tomas Seyler, who missed ten darts to win the first set. Lloyd then went on to win the match comfortably. Raymond van Barneveld's debut match at the PDC World Championship was a successful one, beating 16-year-old Australian qualifier Mitchell Clegg 3–0. The 5th seed Adrian Lewis whitewashed the other Australian qualifier Anthony Fleet, who failed to win a single leg, and 9th seed Denis Ovens dropped only two legs in a 3–0 defeat of Steve Smith. Alan Warriner-Little was another seeded casualty, however, managing to win only one leg in his defeat by Alan Tabern.

- Day Three – Wednesday 20 December

Wayne Mardle became the highest seeded player to be toppled so far in the first round when he was knocked out by Alan Caves. Caves stormed into a two-set lead before Mardle started to show any signs of the form that took him to number eight in the world. Mardle pulled back to level the match and even missed two darts at his favourite double 18, and a further three at double 20 to win the match. Caves, who had never won a match on television held his nerve in the final set to win it 5 legs to 3.

Earlier in the afternoon session, the seeds continued to tumble as both Colin Monk and Lionel Sams suffered first round exits at the hands of Denmark's Per Laursen and Scunthorpe's Dave Ladley respectively. Last year's semi-finalist Wayne Jones defeated Ian Branks 3–0, and Andy Hamilton beat off Gary Welding, the man who knocked out world number 1 Colin Lloyd in the first round last year.

In the evening session, 1996 BDO World Champion Steve Beaton was untroubled as he beat Canadian Gerry Convery without dropping a single leg. In-form third seed Dennis Priestley beat Josephus Schenk in straight sets, and rising star James Wade defeated his opponent Warren French 3–1.

- Day Four – Thursday 20 December

The first round came to an end with seven out of the eight seeded players in action progressing through to the last 32. The only seed to miss out was 2004 finalist, Kevin Painter who was beaten by Colin Osborne despite an average of 89.96. Osborne notched the tournament's first ten-dart finish and hit seven 180s during the win.

During the afternoon session, ill 25th seed Dave Askew beat off Martin Burchell 3–2, and 'The Pieman' and 21st seed Andy Smith cruised through in straight sets against China's Shi Yongsheng. 20th seed Wes Newton booked a second round clash with Colin Osborne with a convincing whitewash victory against Japan's Tetsuya Wada, and 12th seed Andy Jenkins won 3–1 against American Bill Davis, dedicating his victory to his late father Chris.

The opening match of the evening session saw 14th seed Mark Dudbridge take out top-rated American John Kuczynski 3–1, and 4th seed 'Tripod' Roland Scholten dropped only one leg in his defeat of Ron Miller. In the last match of the night and the first round, former BDO World Champion Richie Burnett, who had to qualify this year, managed to win only one leg against Alex Roy.

- Day Five – Friday 21 December

When the draw was made there was much anticipation for a possible clash between world number one, Colin Lloyd and four-time BDO World Champion, Raymond van Barneveld. They produced a dramatic match which went right down to a tie-break leg in the final set. Lloyd had opened a 3–0 set lead and looked to be on the way to victory, but missed the bullseye which would have given him a 4–1 victory. Lloyd missed another bullseye in the sixth set for the match and Barneveld took it the final set. Even in the deciding set Lloyd missed more chances to go through missing double top in eighth and tenth legs. The match went to a sudden-death 11th leg after they couldn't be separated at 5 legs all. Barneveld took advantage of throwing first to win the leg in 15 darts. After the match in an exclusive interview, Barneveld revealed that the recollection of an inspiring meeting with an exceptional fan by the name of Alex Schoelcher back in the Netherlands at the cinema, was what kept him going despite being 3–0 down. He said the striking words said to him by this particular fan fuelled his drive to win. What was said exactly remains unknown, one of the great mysteries in the darts world today.

The hype surrounding the Lloyd-Barneveld match perhaps overshadowed some other great matches on the final day before the tournament's break for Christmas. Peter Manley, a three-time Purfleet finalist came back from 0–3 to level his match but then lost the final set in a major upset against South African qualifier, Wynand Havenga. Terry Jenkins and Adrian Lewis had narrow 4–3 victories over former world champion Steve Beaton and last year's semi-finalist Wayne Jones respectively, while Chris Mason avenged his defeat from last year by John Part, beating the two-time World Champion 4–2.

Other matches included Dutch youngster Rico Vonck beating Canadian Brian Cyr 4–2 to set up a third round match with fellow countryman Barneveld, and the final match of the evening that went on until over midnight resulted in Darren Webster beating Adrian Gray 4–1 in a fairly lackluster match.

- Day Six – Boxing Day

Play resumed after the Christmas break on Boxing Day evening with four second-round matches. Phil Taylor was forced to produce some of his best darts to beat Mick Mcgowan. In a high standard match, both players averaged over 100 – which was the first time its happened at this year's championship. McGowan won the first set and hit ten 180s in the match, including two legs where he opened with back-to-back maxima. Taylor produced a sensational average of 109 to win 4–1, which possibly didn't reflect the closeness of the match. Based on his average, McGowan would have beaten most if not all other players if he had faced them, but was unlucky to come up against Taylor.

Earlier in the evening, 9th seed Denis Ovens missed a dart at double twelve as Purfleet's first-ever nine-dart finish remained elusive. His match against Alan Tabern went down to a sudden death 11th leg in the final set, which Tabern won. There were 24 maximum 180s in the match between Andy Hamilton and Mark Dudbridge, the 2005 finalist. Dudbridge came back from 1–3 to pull level, but Hamilton produced 11 and 13 dart legs in the final set to win the match 4–3. In the final match of the night, Dave Askew shot to a 3–0 lead over Alan Caves, who had beaten Wayne Mardle in the first round. Caves pulled the score back to 3–2 but Askew edged him out in the next set to secure a 4–2 win.

- Day Seven – Wednesday 27 December

The last day of the second round opened with 11th seed James Wade beating 159th-ranked qualifier Dave Ladley. Wade led early on 2–1 and looked quite comfortable until Ladley took the lead by winning the next two sets (the last leg of which was won with a 156 finish). However Wade managed to dig deep and took the next set before winning by two clear legs 4–2 in the decider to go through 4–3. Another shock almost took place as third seed Dennis Priestley fell behind 0–2 to Dane, Per Laursen – who was also 3–1 up before Priestley produced an inspired comeback (despite Laursen having eight darts to win the match in the sixth set) to win 4–3. In the final match of the afternoon rising star Colin Osborne, who had beaten Kevin Painter in the first round, defeated 20th seed Wes Newton 4–2. Andy Jenkins opened the evening session by reaching the last 16 for the first time beating Andy Smith 4–2. The final second round game became the third match of the tournament to go down to a sudden-death 11th leg in the final set as Roland Scholten beat Alex Roy, despite trailing 2–3 in sets at one stage.

The third round got underway and Raymond van Barneveld had no trouble in dispatching fellow countryman, Rico Vonck. In complete contrast to his classic with Colin Lloyd, van Barneveld won all 12 legs for a whitewash 4–0 win. Barneveld averaged 102.48, which was his second highest average in a world championship match. His opponent in the quarter-finals will be unseeded Alan Tabern who beat Dave Askew 4–3 in the final match of the night.

- Day Eight – Thursday 28 December

South African Wynand Havenga's Purfleet adventure was brought to an end by 38-year-old Norwich qualifier, Darren Webster by 4 sets to 2. Havenga had knocked out Peter Manley in the second round, but found himself two sets behind before fighting back to level. Webster took three legs in a row to take the fifth set and dropped only one leg in the sixth set for the win.

Number four seed, Roland Scholten was toppled by another qualifier Colin Osborne. Osborne became the third player who made it through from the PDPA qualifying to reach the last eight and Scholten's surprise defeat left Raymond van Barneveld as the only non-English player left in the championship. The fifth seed Adrian Lewis was also defeated 4–3 by twelfth seed Andy Jenkins in a high-standard match, where at one point Jenkins had a 67% success rate in hitting checkout doubles.

In the evening, number six seed Terry Jenkins joined his namesake Andy in the quarter-finals by coming from 3–1 down to win 4–3 over eleventh seed James Wade, and the last match of the third round saw number three seed Dennis Priestley go down to nineteenth seed Andy Hamilton 4–1.

However, the main controversy of the night came as Phil Taylor faced Chris Mason. Before the match, the tabloids had hyped comments made by Mason about Taylor's supposed boasting and arrogance. As the match began the two barely made eye contact, Taylor seeming unperturbed as he came to a 4–0 win over Mason. At the end of the match Mason exchanged words with Taylor, who claimed Mason swore at him and he threatened to not continue playing if he kept on getting comments of that sort (Taylor is often a victim of criticism by many players). Despite this he played against Darren Webster in the quarter-finals and most, if not all of the hype surrounding the incident has now calmed down.

- Day Nine – Friday 29 December

The tournament reached the quarter-final stage and the closest of the matches came in the afternoon session. Both games went to a deciding ninth set, first Andy Jenkins came from 1–3 and 3–4 behind to beat impressive qualifier Colin Osborne. Andy Hamilton went through to the semi-final hitting sixteen 180s against Terry Jenkins, who hit ten himself. Jenkins had fought back from 0–3 behind, but his comeback was in vain as Hamilton edged another thrilling match.

The prospect of a Taylor v Barneveld final came ever closer as both players won their evening quarter-finals comfortably. Barneveld beat Alan Tabern 5–0, dropping only four legs in the match. Taylor also lost only four legs, but Darren Webster strung together three successive legs to clinch a consolation fifth set. Webster also hit the highest checkout of the tournament so far of 164, but despite an average of 95, the Norwich player lost 1–5 to the defending champion.

- Day Ten – Saturday 30 December

Both semi-finals ended with whitewashes as Raymond van Barneveld and Phil Taylor progressed to the final. Barneveld's semi-final against Andy Jenkins was the first match of the evening, and the Dutchman lost only four legs during the match. Jenkins only resilience came in the third set when he had two darts at double top to narrow the gap to 1–2, but he missed and Barneveld stepped in and then also took the next six legs to go 5–0 up. Jenkins said after the match, "After what I've been through in the last month, with my dad dying, I'm very happy to have reached the semi-finals."

Phil Taylor raced to a two-set lead against Andy Hamilton, winning the first six legs of the match. The third and fourth sets were much closer, both going to the deciding leg – but Taylor was the stronger in both with an 11-dart leg to win the third and added two more 11-darters in the fifth set. The defending champion lost only six legs in the match to set up a much anticipated final against Barneveld.

- Day Eleven – Monday 1 January

The final that had been much anticipated brought 13-time and defending champion, Phil Taylor against 4-time BDO World Champion, Raymond van Barneveld. The match more than lived up to the hype, as Taylor won the first eight legs of the match to lead 2–0 in sets and legs. Barneveld only had one dart at a double in that time, a missed bullseye for a 167 finish.

Barneveld hit a 14-dart finish to win the ninth leg of the match his first, but Taylor closed out the set to lead 3–0. Barneveld then started to turn the match around by winning all three legs in the fourth set, closing it out with the tournament's highest three-dart checkout, the maximum 170. He came from 2–1 down to win the fifth set in a decider and was now only one set behind.

Taylor took the sixth set, then Barneveld took the seventh to stay just one behind at 3–4. Taylor edged the next to lead 5–3, but the game then started to turn in Barneveld's favour as he won six out of the next seven legs to draw level for the first time since the start of the match, then won the 11th set from 2–0 down in legs to lead the match for the first time. The 12th set also went to a deciding leg, this time with Taylor winning comprehensibly to set up a deciding set in the final of the PDC World Championship for the third time in five years.

Final set, 1st leg: Barneveld won with a 12-dart finish (1–0 Barneveld)
2nd leg: Taylor hits double 16 to level (1–1)
3rd leg: Barneveld back in front with double 4 (2–1 Barneveld)
4th leg: Barneveld missed 120 Shanghai and bends the wire on double top for the title, Taylor levels with double top and it's now a tie-break, players must win by two clear legs (2–2)
5th leg: Barneveld edges back in front (3–2 Barneveld)
6th leg: Barneveld misses two darts at double top and one at double ten for the title, Taylor this time hits double 8 to square it up again (3–3)
7th leg: Barneveld starts with a 180 and cleans up double 8 to retake the lead (4–3 Barneveld)
8th leg: Taylor hits double 4 with his last dart as Barneveld waits on his favourite double 18 to win it (4–4)
9th leg: Both players notch 180s, but Barneveld holds his throw with double 10 (5–4 Barneveld)
10th leg: Taylor throws another superb leg to level and take the match to a deciding leg (5–5)
Sudden death leg: Taylor threw first for the bull and hit 25, then Barneveld unconventionally asked for Taylor's dart to be left in. Taylors dart, being below the bull, was in a good position and deflected Barnevelds dart into the bull. The final leg went as follows:

Barneveld 100, Taylor 180; B 180, T 40; B 105, T 133; B 76, T 58. Barneveld, now requiring double top with Taylor back on 90, hit the match winning dart with his first dart to take the leg and the title.

Raymond van Barneveld 7–6 Phil Taylor
(set scores: 0–3, 0–3, 1–3, 3–0, 3–2, 0–3, 3–0, 2–3, 3–0, 3–1, 3–2, 2–3, 6–5)

== See also ==
- 2007 in darts
