= Les Francis =

South African darts player

Personal information
- Full name: Leslie Francis
- Nickname: "Striker"
- Born: 25 May 1956 (age 70) Gauteng, South Africa
- Home town: Gauteng, South Africa

Sport
- Sport: Darts
- Playing since: 1978
- Darts: 24 Gram Unicorn
- Laterality: Right handed
- Walk-on music: "Sandstorm" by Darude

Organisation (see split in darts)
- BDO: 2005
- PDC: 2008–2010

PDC premier events – best performances
- World Championship: Last 72: 2010

Other tournament wins
- Tournament: Years
- PDC World South Africa Qualifying Event: 2009

Leslie "Les" Francis (born 25 May 1956) is a South African former professional darts player who played in Professional Darts Corporation events.

== Career ==
Born in Gauteng, Francis competed in the singles tournament of the 2005 WDF World Cup where he lost to Markus Korhonen in the first round.

Francis competed in the 2008 and 2009 South African Masters. He didn't manage to get through the first round at both editions, he lost to James Wade and Mervyn King respectively.

He qualified for the 2010 PDC World Darts Championship after beating Devon Petersen in the final of the South African qualifying event. He played against Ireland's Aodhagan O'Neill in the preliminary round and lost 4-2 in legs.

Francis also worked as the director of the Gauteng Sports Council and president of the Gauteng Darts Association.

== World Championship results ==
=== PDC ===
- 2010: Last 72: (lost to Aodhagan O'Neill 2–4) (legs)
