= Josephus Schenk =

Dutch darts player

Personal information
- Nickname: "The Orange Machine"
- Born: 19 August 1980 (age 46) Zutphen, Netherlands

Sport
- Sport: Darts
- Playing since: 1994
- Darts: 23g Unicorn Paul Lim
- Laterality: Left-handed
- Walk-on music: "Desire" by U2

Organisation (see split in darts)
- BDO: 2008–2010
- PDC: 2004–2008

PDC premier events – best performances
- World Championship: Last 16: 2005
- UK Open: Last 128: 2007

Josephus Schenk (born 19 August 1980) is a Dutch former professional darts player.

== Career ==
Schenk began playing in the Professional Darts Corporation made his PDC World Darts Championship debut in 2005 where he defeated Darin Young in the first round and Alan Caves in the second round before defeating Peter Manley in the round three stages. His run was ended though in the Last 16 stages by Andy Hamilton. In the 2007 PDC World Darts Championship, Schenk was beaten in the first round by Dennis Priestley. This was followed by an appearance in the 2007 UK Open but was beaten early in the competition by Geoff Harkup.

In 2008, Schenk began playing in the Nederlandse Darts Bond, an affiliation of the British Darts Organisation and in 2009 he began playing in the BDO/WDF circuit.

In 2019, Schenk competed playing in the Dutch Open Men's Pairs with Derk Telnekes, losing in the quarter-finals to Gino Vos and Berry van Peer.

== World Championship results ==
=== PDC ===
- 2005: Fourth round (lost to Andy Hamilton 1–4) (sets)
- 2007: First round (lost to Dennis Priestley 0–3)
