= Wynand Havenga =

South African darts player (1965–2025)

Personal information
- Nickname: "Springbok"
- Born: 6 September 1965 Parow, South Africa
- Died: 10 January 2025 (aged 59)
- Home town: Cape Town, South Africa

Sport
- Sport: Darts
- Playing since: 1986
- Darts: 19g Harrows
- Laterality: Right-handed
- Walk-on music: "Welcome to the Jungle" by Guns N' Roses

Organisation (see split in darts)
- BDO: 1997–2006
- PDC: 2006–2010

PDC premier events – best performances
- World Championship: Last 16: 2007

Other tournament wins
- Tournament: Years
- Emperors Palace South African Open: 2006

Wynand Havenga (6 September 1965 – 10 January 2025) was a South African professional darts player.

== Career ==
Havenga made his television debut at the 2007 PDC World Darts Championship as a qualifier, having beaten almost 100 players to win the South African Masters and thus earn his place at the Circus Tavern. He beat Steve Maish in the first round and then conquered established pro Peter Manley in round two, but bowed out in the last 16 to Darren Webster. Havenga became a popular figure during the World Championship, his unique celebrations while winning a leg, or even hitting a 180, led comparisons to Cliff Lazarenko and a fan-base, who call themselves the "Havenga Boys". However, he struggled with a shoulder injury and his ranking fell to 500, after the £8,500 he earned at Circus Tavern was wiped off in 2009 due to the two-year-cyclical rule of the PDC Order of Merit.

== Personal life and death ==
Outside darts, he was a business manager for a motor dealer.

Havenga died on 10 January 2025, at the age of 59. The Professional Darts Corporation, as well as fellow South African darts players Devon Petersen and Graham Filby paid tribute to him following his death.

== World Championship results ==
=== PDC ===
- 2007: Third round (lost to Darren Webster 2–4) (sets)
