= Olga Meyer =

Norwegian journalist and radio host (1930–2018)

- Born: 8 August 1930; Fana, Norway
- Died: 27 August 2018 (aged 88); Oslo, Norway
- Occupations: Journalist and radio host

Olga Meyer (8 August 1930 – 27 August 2018) was a Norwegian journalist and radio host.

She was born in Fana, and was educated as schoolteacher from Volda Teachers' College. She was assigned with NRK Radio from 1969. Programs she worked with in include Kvardagen, Forbrukaren har ordet, På direkten, Sånn er livet, Sølvsuper and Nitimen. She was awarded Kringkastingsprisen in 1981, and was named honorary member of Noregs Mållag in 2000.

She died in Oslo in 2018.

== Selected works ==
- Dyrehistorier i Nitimen (1996)
