= Dick van Dijk (darts player) =

Dutch darts player

Personal information
- Nickname: The Undertaker
- Born: 20 May 1970 (age 56) 's-Hertogenbosch, Netherlands
- Home town: The Hague, Netherlands

Sport
- Sport: Darts
- Playing since: 1995
- Darts: 23g Harrows Magnum
- Laterality: Right-handed
- Walk-on music: "How You Remind Me" by Nickelback

Organisation (see split in darts)
- BDO: 2003–2009
- PDC: 2009–2019

WDF major events – best performances
- World Masters: Last 32: 2003
- World Trophy: Last 32: 2004, 2006
- Int. Darts League: Last 32 Group: 2006
- Finder Masters: Quarter-final: 2005

PDC premier events – best performances
- UK Open: Last 128: 2016

Other tournament wins
- Years
WDF World Cup Singles	2005

Dick van Dijk (born 20 May 1970) is a Dutch former professional darts player who competed in British Darts Organisation (BDO) and Professional Darts Corporation (PDC) events.

== Career ==
Van Dijk reached the last 32 of the 2003 Winmau World Masters, beating former world champion Tony David in the first round, then losing to Martin Atkins. In 2005, he won the WDF World Cup, beating Per Laursen in the final. He followed this with a disappointing first round exit at the World Masters, losing to the unknown Swede Bo Larsson. Since then his form has declined, losing in the Last 32 Group Stage of the 2006 International Darts League and the first round of the World Masters, losing to future World Champion Mark Webster.

In April 2007, van Dijk played in the PDC Open Holland Masters, reaching the last 32 and earning £150. He played in another PDC ranked tournament in the Netherlands, playing in two PDPA Players Championship in Eindhoven, winning only £75. Despite these appearances, van Dijk has not yet applied for PDPA membership and remains a WDF/BDO player. He was invited to participate in the 2007 Winmau World Masters but had to withdraw due to bypass surgery.

Van Dijk was unsuccessful in his attempts to qualify for 2009 BDO World Darts Championship. In 2009 he reached the semi-finals of the unranked Vonderke Masters and then reached the last 16 of the Dutch Open. He failed to qualify for the 2010 BDO World Darts Championship and suffered a first round exit in the 2009 World Masters. He then played in three PDC events in the Netherlands and Germany without earning money in the events.

== Career finals ==
=== WDF major finals: 1 (1 title) ===
Outcome	No.	Year	Championship	Opponent in the final	Score
Winner	1.	2005	World Cup Singles	(Denmark) Per Laursen	4–1 (s)
