= Aodhagan O'Neill =

Irish darts player (born 1959)

Personal information
- Full name: Aodhagan Bernard O'Neill
- Nickname: "The Silver Fox"
- Born: 28 October 1959 (age 66) Cavan, Ireland
- Home town: Ballyconnell, Ireland

Sport
- Sport: Darts
- Playing since: 2000
- Darts: 22 Gram
- Laterality: Right-handed
- Walk-on music: "This Is How We Do It" by Montell Jordan

Organisation (see split in darts)
- BDO: 2003–2008
- PDC: 2008–2012

WDF major events – best performances
- World Masters: Last 40: 2007

PDC premier events – best performances
- World Championship: Last 64: 2010
- UK Open: Last 160: 2011
- US Open/WSoD: Last 128: 2010

Other tournament wins
- Years
Tom Kirby Memorial Trophy	2009

Aodhagan Bernard O'Neill (born 28 October 1959) is an Irish former professional darts player who has played in events of the Professional Darts Corporation (PDC).

== Career ==
O'Neill won the 2009 Tom Kirby Memorial Irish Matchplay beating Jason Cullen, Benny Grace and William O'Connor, earning him a place in the 2010 PDC World Darts Championship. He later reached the quarter-finals of the Gleneagle Irish Masters, beating Terry Jenkins, Nick Fullwell, and Andy Jenkins before losing 5-2 to Brendan Dolan.

O'Neill played his staged debut of the 2010 PDC World Darts Championship, defeated by South Africa's Les Francis in the preliminary round, but lost 3-0 to Adrian Lewis in the first round.

O'Neill quit of the PDC in 2012.

O'Neill began playing in the World Inclusio ParaDarts since June 2026.

== Personal life ==
O'Neill makes his living as a chef in the Irish Army.

== World Championship results ==
=== PDC ===
- 2010: 1st Round (lost to Adrian Lewis 0-3) (sets)
