= Niels-Jørgen Hansen =

Danish darts player

Personal information
- Full name: Niels-Jørgen Hansen
- Nickname: The Eagle
- Born: 22 October 1965 (age 60) Denmark

Sport
- Sport: Darts
- Playing since: 1997
- Darts: 23g Ton Machine
- Laterality: Left-handed
- Walk-on music: "Tubthumping" by Chumbawamba

Organisation (see split in darts)
- BDO: 2007–2019
- PDC: 2019–

WDF major events – best performances
- World Masters: Last 80: 2017

Niels-Jørgen Hansen (born 22 October 1965) is a Danish professional darts player who has played in Professional Darts Corporation (PDC) events.

== Career ==
Hansen's first bigger tournament was the German Open in 2007, where he was one of the final 64. Throughout his career, he has competed in several similar tournaments.

In 2012 Scandinavian Darts Corporation Pro Tour in Denmark, he made it to the final, which he lost 3–6 to Dennis Lindskjold.

In the year 2016, Niels-Jørgen Hansen was one of the competitors in the 2016 Danish Darts Challenge that was held in Odense.

He was due to make his PDC European Tour debut in June 2019 at the 2019 Danish Darts Open, where he was scheduled to face Ryan Harrington in the first round.
