= Frede Johansen =

Danish darts player

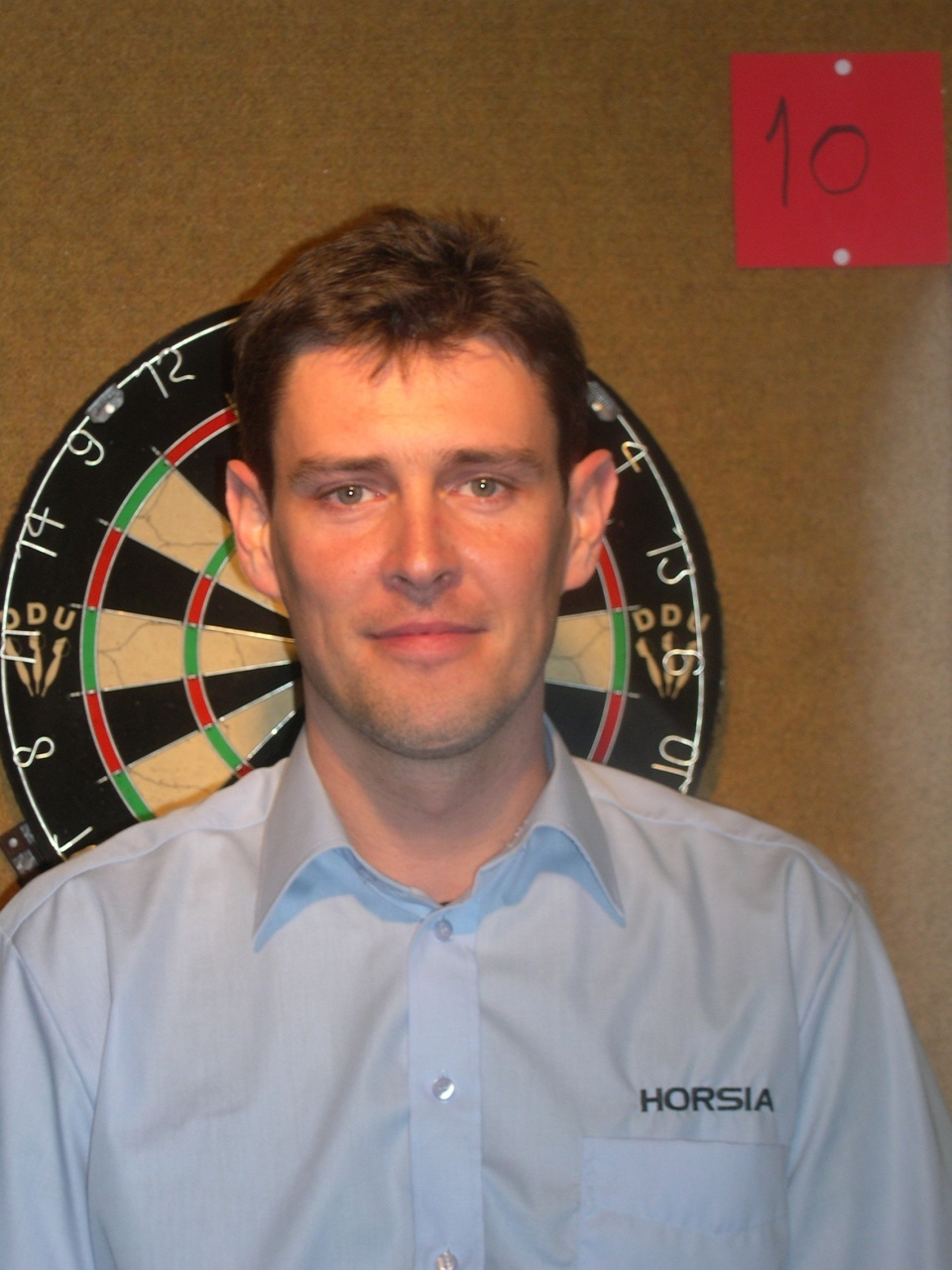
- Johansen in 2004

Personal information
- Full name: Christian Frede Johansen
- Nickname: "The Panther"
- Born: 7 August 1969 (age 57) Horsens, Denmark

Sport
- Sport: Darts
- Playing since: 1989
- Darts: 21g
- Laterality: Right-handed
- Walk-on music: "Swamp Thing" by The Grid

Organisation (see split in darts)
- BDO: 1998–2017

WDF major events – best performances
- World Masters: Last 128: 1998, 2000

Other tournament wins
- Tournament: Years
- Nordic Cup Open WDF Europe Cup Team WDF Europe Cup Overall Nordic Invitational Pairs Danish National Ch'ship: 1998; 2008 2008 2012 1995, 1997, 1998, 1999

Frede Johansen is a Danish former professional darts player who competed in British Darts Organisation (BDO) events.

Johansen is a 4 times Danish Champion, who has been picked 24 times for the Danish national team which put him on the list as number 2, just after Stig Jørgensen.

He reached the semi-final of the 2000 WDF Europe Cup, losing to the eventual winner Mitchell Crooks – he was also a member of the Danish team, who won the Team event and became overall champions at the 2008 WDF Europe Cup with Per Laursen, Stig Jørgensen & Preben Krabben.

In 2012, at the Nordic Championships, he won the pairs event together with Vladimir Andersen beating Daniel Larsson and Johan Engström from Sweden in the final

In 1999 he made one of only six Danish 9-darters during time.
