= Stig Jørgensen =

Danish darts player

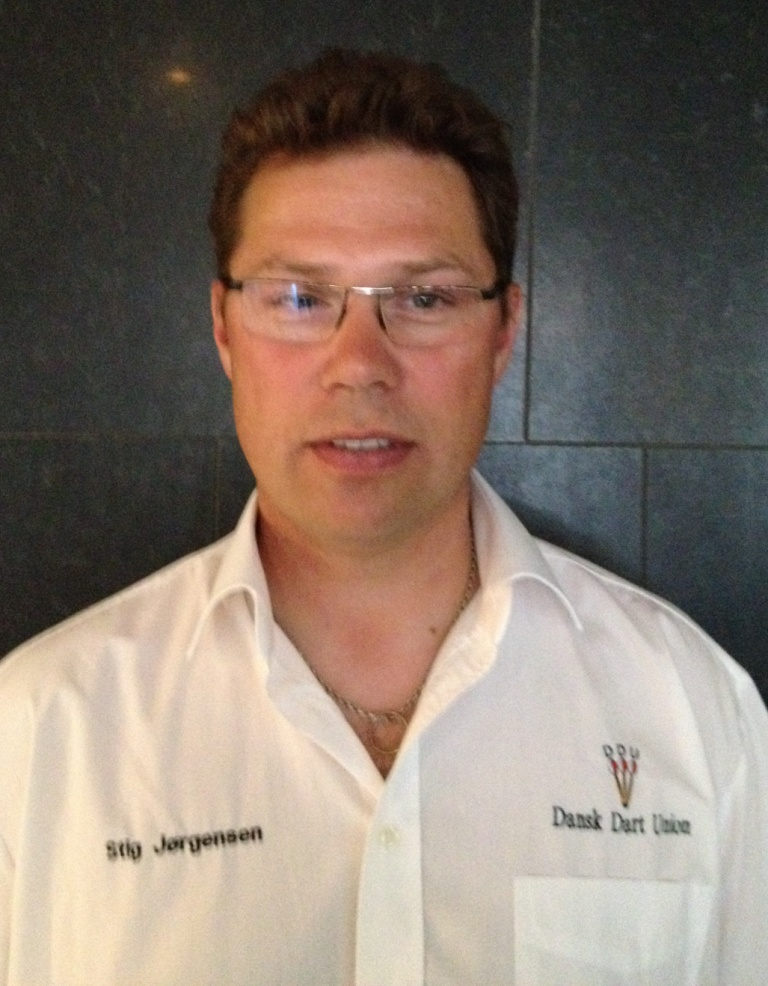

Personal information
- Nickname: "The Stig"
- Born: 30 March 1967 (age 59) Ringsted, Denmark

Sport
- Sport: Darts
- Playing since: 1985
- Darts: 23g
- Laterality: Right-handed
- Walk-on music: "Jump" by Kris Kross

Organisation (see split in darts)
- BDO: 1995–2015

WDF major events – best performances
- World Masters: Last 64: 1998, 1999

Other tournament wins
- Tournament: Years
- WDF Europe Cup Team WDF Europe Cup Overall: 2008 2008

Stig Jørgensen is a Danish former professional darts player who competed in British Darts Organisation (BDO) events.

== Career ==
Jørgensen has been picked 26 times for the Danish national team, which is an all-time record. Among other tournaments, Jørgensen has played 6 WDF World Cups and 5 WDF Europe Cups.

He was part of the Danish team which won the team and overall events at the 2008 WDF Europe Cup together with Frede Johansen, Per Laursen & Preben Krabben.
