= Dennis Lindskjold =

Danish darts player

Personal information
- Nickname: The Beast
- Born: 21 December 1977 (age 48) Augustenborg, Denmark
- Home town: Sønderborg, Denmark

Sport
- Sport: Darts
- Playing since: 1997
- Darts: 22 Gram
- Laterality: Right-handed
- Walk-on music: "No Limit" by 2 Unlimited

Organisation (see split in darts)
- BDO: 2004–2010, 2016–2020
- PDC: 2012–2016

WDF major events – best performances
- World Masters: Last 128: 2004

PDC premier events – best performances
- World Championship: Last 72: 2014

Other tournament wins
- Years
| Nordic Cup Open | 2014 |
| PDC World Scandinavian Qualifying Event | 2013 |
| SDC Denmark | 2012 |

Dennis Lindskjold (born 21 December 1977) is a Danish former professional darts player.

== Career ==
Lindskjold has been picked 7 times for the Danish national team.

In September 2012, he won a Scandinavian Pro Tour event in Denmark by defeating Niels Jorgen Hansen 6–3 in the final. A year later he beat Soren Hedegaard, Jarkko Komula, Magnus Caris and Jani Haavisto to qualify for the 2014 PDC World Championship. At the World Championship, Lindskjold was supposed to face Edward Santos in the preliminary round but due to visa trouble for the Philippine, Lindskjold faced Colin Osborne instead. Lindskjold won the first leg but went on to be beaten 4–1.

He won the 2014 Nordic Cup Open by beating Mats Andersson in the final. Lindskjold made his debut in the World Cup of Darts in 2014, representing Denmark with Per Laursen and they were eliminated 5–2 by Australia in the first round. Laursen defeated Lindskjold in the final of the 2015 DDL Esbjerg event.

In the year 2016, Dennis Lindskjold won the 2016 Danish Darts Challenge tournament in the final against Per Skau. The tournament was held from 7 February to 13 March 2016 in Odense.

== World Championship results ==
=== PDC ===
- 2014: Preliminary round (lost to Colin Osborne 1–4) (legs)
