= Per Laursen =

Danish darts player

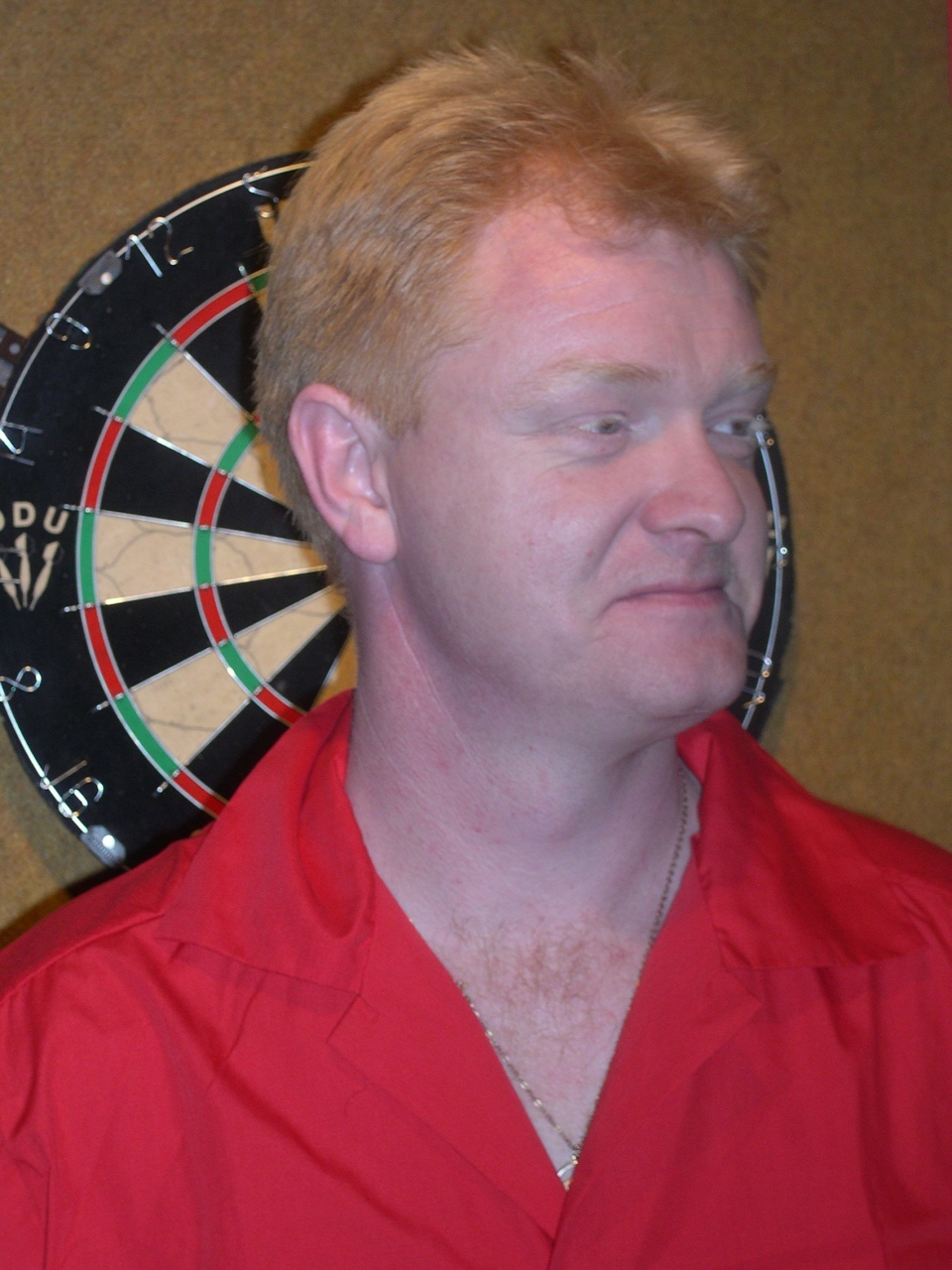
- Laursen in 2004

Personal information
- Nickname: Peachy
- Born: 16 April 1966 (age 60) Denmark
- Home town: Låsby, Denmark

Sport
- Sport: Darts
- Playing since: 1986
- Darts: 25 Gram Savages
- Laterality: Right-handed
- Walk-on music: "Jump" by Van Halen

Organisation (see split in darts)
- BDO: 2000–2006
- PDC: 2006–

WDF major events – best performances
- World Championship: Last 16: 2006
- World Masters: Last 64: 2002, 2003, 2004
- World Trophy: Last 32: 2005
- Int. Darts League: Group stages: 2006

PDC premier events – best performances
- World Championship: Last 32: 2007, 2011, 2014

Other tournament wins
- Years
DDL Esbjerg	2015, 2015
DDL FIOV	2015
DDL Samsø	2015, 2015
Denmark National Ch'hips	2007, 2008
SDC Denmark	2013, 2014
SDC Finland	2013, 2016
SDC Sweden	2015, 2015
Top Gun	2017
Welsh Open	2005

Other achievements
- 2005 WDF World Cup Runner up, single and pairs

Per Laursen (born 16 April 1966) is a Danish professional darts player who plays in Professional Darts Corporation (PDC) and British Darts Organisation (BDO) tournaments.

== BDO career ==
Laursen reached the final of the WDF World Cup in both single and pairs (with Brian Sorensen) in 2005 and won the Welsh Open earlier that year – performances which enabled him to qualify for the BDO World Darts Championship for the first time in 2006.

On his television debut in the 2006 BDO World Darts Championship, he defeated number five seed Tony Eccles in the first round but lost to Shaun Greatbatch in round two.

== PDC career ==
Laursen became the first Dane to play in the PDC World Darts Championship in the 2007 competition beating Colin Monk 3–0 in the first round, but lost to Dennis Priestley in the second round, despite the fact that Laursen was 3–1 up and missed eight darts to win the match before losing 4–3.

He came through the Danish Qualifying system for the second time for the 2008 PDC World Darts Championship but lost 3–1 to Alan Tabern in the first round.

Laursen has had some success in tournaments in his own country, reaching the final of the Danish Open in 2006 (losing to Vincent van der Voort) and winning the Danish National Championships in 2004, 2007 and 2008

Laursen competed in the 2009 PDC World Darts Championship, having finished top of the Danish Darts Standing for a third successive year. He was beaten 3–1 in the first round by Wes Newton.

At the 2010 PDC World Darts Championship Denmark had lost their direct place and Laursen, who had won the Danish qualification for the fourth time, had to qualify through the preliminary round but lost to Christian Perez of the Philippines.

Laursen qualified for the preliminary round of the 2011 World Championship, beating Boris Krcmar from Croatia 4–2 (legs).

In the first round he played three-time world champion John Part and won 3–0 to set up a second round match with defending champion Phil Taylor- a match he lost 4–0 while averaging 93.19.

At the 2012 World Championship he let a 2–0 leg lead slip against Petri Korte in the preliminary round, as he went on to lose the match 3–4. He represented Denmark with Jann Hoffmann in the 2012 PDC World Cup of Darts and together they were beaten 1–3 by Northern Ireland in the second round, having defeated Gibraltar in round 1. In October, he beat Mensur Suljović 6–2 to qualify for the European Tour Event 5, where he was beaten 4–6 by second seed Simon Whitlock in the first round.

Laursen played in his third World Cup of Darts and second with Jann Hoffmann in February 2013 and despite beating South Africa 5–4 in their first match, they finished bottom of Group B on leg difference following a 0–5 loss to the Republic of Ireland. Laursen won two events on the Scandinavian Pro Tour during 2013 and was a losing finalist in two others to finish top of the Order of Merit and qualify for the 2014 World Championship, where he beat Colin McGarry 4–2 in the preliminary round. He then defied a nine-dart finish from Terry Jenkins in the deciding set of the first round to win 3–2, but saw his run come to an end in the next round as he lost 4–2 to Peter Wright.

In January 2014, Laursen received a Tour card for the 2014 PDC Tour by topping last year's Scandinavian Order of Merit. Laursen and Dennis Lindskjold lost 5–2 to Australia in the first round of the World Cup of Darts. Despite being eligible to participate in all PDC events, Laursen only played in Scandinavian tournaments during the year, winning the first Danish event by beating Daniel Larsson 6–2. He won two events on the 2015 Scandinavian Darts Corporation Pro Tour to finish second on the Order of Merit and seal his place in the preliminary round of the 2016 World Championship and a meeting with Andy Boulton which went to a deciding set. Laursen went two legs to none up, but then missed four match darts and would lose 2–1. He won the first Scandinavian Pro Tour event of 2016 and also lost in the final of the penultimate event. Laursen and Daniel Jensen played Australia in the second round of the World Cup after beating Sweden 5–2. Laursen overcame Kyle Anderson 4–2 to send the match into a doubles decider in which Denmark were whitewashed 4–0.

== World Championship results ==
=== BDO ===
- 2006: Second round (lost to Shaun Greatbatch 2–4) (sets)

=== PDC ===
- 2007: Second round (lost to Dennis Priestley 3–4)
- 2008: First round (lost to Alan Tabern 1–3)
- 2009: First round (lost to Wes Newton 1–3)
- 2010: Preliminary round (lost to Christian Perez 3–4) (legs)
- 2011: Second round (lost to Phil Taylor 0–4)
- 2012: Preliminary round (lost to Petri Korte 3–4) (legs)
- 2014: Second round (lost to Peter Wright 2–4)
- 2016: Preliminary round (lost to Andy Boulton 1–2)

== Career finals ==
=== WDF major finals: 1 (1 runner-up) ===
Outcome	No.	Year	Championship	Opponent in the final	Score (Note: (l) = score in legs, (s) = score in sets.)
Runner-up	1.	2005	World Cup Singles	(Netherlands) Dick van Dijk	1–4 (s)
