= Kime (disambiguation) =

Kime is a Japanese martial arts term.

Kime may also refer to:

- Kime (surname)
- Kime, Missouri, U.S. ghost town
- Kime, complex time in physics
