= England Darts Organisation =

England Darts Organisation official logo

The England Darts Organisation was formed in 2007. Previously England Darts was administered by the British Darts Organisation (BDO); however, with the withdrawal of tobacco sponsorship, the BDO withdrew its support for England.

In November 2006 the 43 member English counties of the BDO formed a steering committee to look at the feasibility of forming an independent England. The steering committee consisted of Peter Melton from Cambridgeshire the then existing England team manager, Vic Sexton (Sussex) the current England youth manager within the BDO Board of Directors, Ian Tilley from Lincolnshire and Colin Saunders from the Isle of Wight. Tommy Thompson Lancashire, who had 10 years earlier attempted to form an independent England, was approached to be part of the committee, but declined.

In April 2007 the first England AGM took place at Canley Club in Coventry, where Tommy Thompson was elected chairman, Peter Melton international director, Vic Sexton tournament & youth director, Colin Saunders commercial director, and John Peoples from Cleveland communications director. Sam Hawkins was elected honorary president and Bobby George was elected public relations executive. In 2009 Jean Thomas from Yorkshire replaced Colin Saunders on the board of directors, and Bernie Crouch (Rutland) also joined the board as an executive member dealing with technology. The England Board of Directors was increased to six people on 22 May 2011 at the England AGM. Bernie Crouch was elected to join the existing board as director of I.T.

== Membership ==
The 43 England counties compete in the British Inter-Counties Darts Championships each year between September and May.

== Aims of the organisation ==
The England Darts Organisation was formed to raise money to enable the England national teams to compete at international darts events around the world.

== Events England compete in ==
England competes in the British Internationals each year, with separate men's and ladies' championships. The men's championship consists of 12 players and ladies' six players, and take place each April. The event is held by each of the three countries (England, Scotland and Wales) on a rotating basis. The event in 2011 was England's first opportunity to stage the championships and was held on 9 and 10 April 2011 at The Marine Hall & Waterfront Venue Fleetwood in Lancashire. England men's and ladies' teams both won their respective championships.

The Six Nation Championships take place each February, with England taking their place alongside Wales, Scotland, Republic of Ireland, Northern Ireland and the Netherlands. The matches are played on a round-robin basis with separate events for men and ladies. Four players compete in the men's event, and two in the ladies'. The 2011 event was held at Erskine Bridge Glasgow Scotland, England men won the title, and the Wales ladies took the ladies' title.

The Europe Cup is bi-annual and features men's and ladies' championships.

The World Cup is bi-annual and features men's, ladies', boys', and girls' championships. The World Cup in 2011 was held in the Republic of Ireland. Scott Waites (Yorks), Tony O'Shea (Cheshire), Martin Atkins (Yorks) and Martin Adams (Cambs) and captain represented the men's team. Trina Gulliver (Warwickshire) and Deta Hedman (Oxon) represented the ladies' team. Fallon Sherrock (Bucks) and Jake Jones (Staffs) represented the youth team.

England made history by being the first team to win all three categories. Scott Waites also won the World Cup men's singles title, with Trina Gulliver taking the ladies' title and Fallon Sherrock the girls' title.

Martin Adams and Tony O'Shea won the World Cup pairs men's title. Trina Gulliver and Deta Hedman won the ladies'title, and Jake Jones and Fallon Sherrock won the youth team event. The event was attended by 39 countries including Iran, South Africa, USA, Canada and a number of European countries.

== Events ==
England organise several events. The England Open, now run at the Bunn Leisure Holiday Centre, Selsey in Sussex during June, is the biggest open competition in the world for a comparable entry fee, and has been awarded a Category A status. The England Classic also takes place at Selsey in September each year. The England Masters and The England National Singles have enjoyed many venues, originally hosted at the Cheshire Conference Centre before moving in 2011 to the Norbreck Castle in Blackpool and in 2012 to an Olympic venue, the Ricoh Arena Coventry.

England also organise the England qualifiers into the Winmau World Masters Championships.

England have also set up a unique collaboration with the Welsh Darts Organisation to present the Anglo-Celtic-County-Cup, which is held in June for inter-county teams.

England Darts is now solely responsible for all aspects of the England international tams, where many of the stars of the World Championships can be seen each year on BBC TV, including Martin Adams and Trina Gulliver, current champions of the world, and respective England national team captains.

== Roll of honour ==
=== England Open ===
Year	Ladies' singles	Men's singles	Girls' singles	Boys' singles	Ladies' pairs	Men's pairs	Mixed events	Early Bird
2008	Trina Gulliver	Ross Montgomery	n/a	Shaun Griffiths	Linda Itthuralde & Wendy Reinstadtler	Martin Atkins & John Walton	Barbara Lee & Ian Brand	n/a
2009	Irina Armstrong	Ted Hankey	Zoe Jones	Nathan Pearce	Lisa Ashton & Karen Lawman	Brian Dawson & Dean Winstanley	Dawn Standley & Gary Butcher	n/a
2010	Trina Gulliver	Dean Winstanley	Zoe Jones	Kurtis Atkins	Donna Rainsley & Trish Kidd	Paul Hogan & Paul Gibbs	Karen Lawman, Martin Atkins & John Walton	n/a
2011	Karen Lawman	Gary Robson	Stacey Ellis	Craig Brown	Trina Gulliver & Lisa Ashton	Paul Hogan & Paul Gibbs	Linda Jones, Ash Khayat & David Pallett	Alan Norris
2012	Anastasia Dobromyslova	Wesley Harms	Fallon Sherrock	Andrew Clark	Steph Smee & Wendy Reinstadtler	Garry Thompson & Scott Waites	Anastasia Dobromyslova, Stephen Bunting & Benito Van De Pas	Richie George
2013	Deta Hedman	Stephen Bunting	Natasha Eaves	Kallum Graham	Trina Gulliver & Lisa Ashton	Wesley Harms & Jeffrey de Graaf	Deta Heman, Robbie Green & Alan Norris	Robbie Green
2014	Anastasia Dobromyslova	Wesley Harms	n/a	Billy Holmes	Lorraine Winstanley & Anastasia Dobromyslova	Wesley Harms & Jeffrey de Graaf	Deta Heman, Robbie Green, Alan Norris & Wesley Harms	Jan Dekker
2015	Fallon Sherrock	Wesley Harms	Natasha Eaves	Owen Maiden	Lisa Ashton & Trina Gulliver	Dennis Harbour & Steve Carrett	Lisa Ashton, Martin Atkins, Glen Durrant & Jim Williams	n/a
2016	Deta Hedman	Glen Durrant	Beau Greaves	Alex Gurr	Lorraine Winstanley & Anastasia Dobromyslova	Darius Labanauskas & Madars Razma	Danielle Ashton, Lee Shewan, Rhys Griffin Kieran Smith	n/a
2017	Lorraine Winstanley	Geert de Vos	Beau Greaves	Keelan Kay	Lisa Ashton & Trina Gulliver	Martin Atkins & Glen Durrant	Chris Fidler & Claire Brookin	n/a
2018	Lisa Ashton	Kyle McKinstry	Beau Greaves	Connor Arberry	Fallon Sherrock & Casey Gallagher	Steve Carrett & Dennis Harbour	n/a	n/a
2019	Beau Greaves	Jim Williams	Beau Greaves	Beau Greaves	Lisa Ashton & Maria O Brien	Richard Veenstra & Wesley Harms	Gary Stone, Lorraine Hyde, Ryan Hogarth & Jamie Holmes	n/a
2020	Not held							
2021	Deta Hedman	Brian Raman	Luke Littler	Paige Pauling	Fallon Sherrock & Corrine Hammond	Chris Grannell & Joshua Burksfield	Cameron Menzies, Ryan Hoggarth, Rhys Hayden & Fallon Sherrock	n/a
2024	Beau Greaves	Neil Duff	Ruby Grey	Thomas Banks	Beau Greaves & Deta Hedman	Anthony Allen & James Beeton	Deta Hedman & Neil Duff (Pairs)	n/a
2025	Sophie McKinlay	Jim McEwan	Ruby Grey	Mason Teese	Deta Hedman & Anca Ziljstra	Dave Prins & Mathew Hodgson	Cayden Smith & Nick Fulwell & Lee-May Dalloway (Mixed 3s)	n/a

=== England Masters ===
Year	Ladies' singles	Men's singles	Girls' singles	Boys' singles	Ladies' pairs	Men's pairs
2009	Trina Gulliver	Brian Woods	n/a	Ben Oldroyd	n/a	n/a
2010	Deta Hedman	John Walton	n/a	Ash Khayat	Sandra Greatbatch & Juliet Findley	Tony O'Shea & Darryl Fitton
2011	Anastasia Dobromyslova	John Walton	n/a	Jake Jones	Trina Gulliver & Lisa Ashton	Dean Winstanley & Robbie Green
2012	Anastasia Dobromyslova	Darryl Gurney	n/a	Josh McCarthy	Julie Gore & Tricia Wright	Garry Thompson & Scott Waites
2013	Anastasia Dobromyslova	Stephen Bunting	n/a	Charlie Burns	Claire Ball & Amanda Mallett	Ross Montgomery & Robbie Green
2014	Anastasia Dobromyslova	Gary Robson	Casey Gallagher	Callan Rydz	Lisa Ashton & Trina Gulliver	Robbie Green & Alan Norris
2015	Lisa Ashton	Glen Durrant	n/a	n/a	n/a	n/a
2016	Deta Hedman	Glen Durrant	n/a	n/a	n/a	n/a
2017	Deta Hedman	Andy Baetens	n/a	n/a	n/a	n/a
2018	Anastasia Dobromyslova	Jim Williams	n/a	n/a	n/a	n/a
2019	Lisa Ashton	Scott Mitchell	n/a	n/a	n/a	n/a
2020	Not held					
2021	Not held					
2022	Not held					
2024	Paige Pauling	Reece Colley	n/a	n/a	n/a	n/a
2025	Gemma Hayter	Neil Duff	n/a	n/a	n/a	n/a

=== England International Open ===
Year	Ladies' singles	Men's singles
2022	Lisa Ashton	Luke Littler

=== England Cove Open ===
Year	Winner
2025	Neil Duff

=== England Classic ===
Year	Ladies' singles	Men's singles	Girls' singles	Boys' singles	Ladies' pairs	Men's pairs	Mixed events	Early Bird
2010	Deta Hedman	Stephen Bunting	n/a	Jimmy Hendriks	Hayley Plume & Marlene Badger	John Walton & Martin Atkins	Brian Woods, Jamie Lewis & Deta Hedman	Martin Atkins
2011	Julie Gore	Stephen Bunting	Josie Paterson	Thomas Chant	Trina Gulliver & Lisa Ashton	Ross Montgomery & Steve Douglas	Paul Roe, Steve Shadwell & Ally Judge	Darren Webster
2012	Deta Hedman	Glen Durrant	Natasha Eaves	Andrew Clark	Lorraine Farlam & Anastasia Dobromyslova	Glen Durrant & Tony Eccles	Geoff Heath, Steve Rose & Jo Sibley	James Wilson
2013	Deta Hedman	Glen Durrant	n/a	Josh McCarthy	Trina Gulliver & Lisa Ashton	Tony O'Shea & Jimmy Hendriks	Wesley Harms, Jim Williams & Dee Bateman	TBA
2014	Anastasia Dobromyslova	Mark McGeeney	Natasha Eaves	George Cressey	Zoe Jones & Claire Ball	Martin Atkins & Glen Durrant	Sam Heads Team	Jamie Hughes
2015	Lisa Ashton	Glen Durrant	Beau Greaves	Lewis Gurney	Casey Gallagher & Fallon Sherrock	Madars Razma & Darius Labanauskas	Allan Edwards, Geoff Heath, Jason Heaver & Jo Rolls	n/a
2016	Lisa Ashton	Dean Reynolds	Nicolle Bidgway	Tyler Radlett	Deta Hedman & Rachel Brooks	Glen Durrant & Martin Atkins	Darryl Fitton, Jimmy Hendriks, Conan Whitehead & Julie Thompson	n/a
2017	Lorraine Winstanley	Jeffrey Sparidaans	Beau Greaves	Jarred Cole	Sue Edwards & Rhian Griffiths	Ryan Hogarth & Cameron Menzies	Glen Durrant, James Hurrell, Dean Reynolds & Corrine Hammond	n/a
2018	Anastasia Dobromyslova	Wesley Harms	Beau Greaves	Connor Arberry	Maria O Brien & Trina Gulliver MBE	Richard Veenstra & Wesley Harms	Paul Brown, Glen Durrant, Jim Williams & Fallon Sherrock	n/a
2019	Anastasia Dobromyslova	Wesley Harms	Beau Greaves	Beau Greaves	Lorraine Winstanley & Corrine Hammond	Nick Fulwell & Graham Usher	Paul Brown, Justin Thompson, Dan Day & Fallon Sherrock	n/a
2020	Not held							
2021	Not held							
2022	Beau Greaves	Rob Owen	Paige Pauling	Luke Littler	Beau Greaves & Deta Hedman	Richard Veenstra & Chris Landman	Nick Kenny & Lisa Ashton (Pairs Event)	n/a
2024	Deta Hedman	Jarred Cole	Paige Pauling	Jack Nankervis	Deta Hedman & Paige Pauling	Geoff Heath & Archie Self	James Hurrell, Suzanne Smith & Aaron Turner	n/a
2025	Gemma Hayter	David Pallett	Paige Pauling	Jack Nankervis	Rhian O'Sullivan & Eve Watson	Matt Clark & David Fatum	Geoffrey Heath, Jason Heaver & Anca Zijlstra	n/a

=== England National Singles ===
Year	Ladies' singles	Men's singles
2009	Trina Gulliver	Ian White
2010	Clare Bywaters	Darryl Fitton
2011	Lisa Ashton	Gary Robson
2012	Lisa Ashton	Robbie Green
2013	Trina Gulliver	Garry Thompson
2014	Anastasia Dobromyslova	Steve Carrett
2015	Fallon Sherrock	Dennis Harbour
2016	Deta Hedman	Gary Robson
2017	Deta Hedman	Scott Mitchell
2018	Fallon Sherrock	Scott Mitchell
2019	Beau Greaves	Wesley Harms
2020	Not held	
2021	Fallon Sherrock	Neil Duff
2022	Rhian O'Sullivan	Scott Marsh
2025	Deta Hedman	Jim McEwan

=== England Matchplay ===
Year	Ladies' singles	Men's singles	Girls' singles	Boys' singles
2012	Zoe Jones	Martin Atkins	n/a	n/a
2013	Lisa Ashton	Stephen Bunting	n/a	n/a
2014	Zoe Jones	Scott Mitchell	Casey Gallagher	Josh McCarthy
2015	Anastasia Dobromyslova	Glen Durrant	Beau Greaves	Chris Gower
2016	Lisa Ashton	Glen Durrant	Natasha Eaves	Jack Vincent
2017	Lorraine Winstanley	Glen Durrant	Beau Greaves	Tyler Radlett
2018	Fallon Sherrock	Glen Durrant	Beau Greaves	Brad Phillips
2019	Anastasia Dobromyslova	Scott Mitchell	Beau Greaves	Charlie Manby

=== Isle of Man Festival ===
Year	Ladies' open	Men's open	Youth singles	Girls' singles	Ladies' classic	Men's classic	Ladies' masters	Men's masters	Mixed events	Ladies' pairs	Men's pairs	Cabbages
2016	Lisa Ashton	Tony O'Shea	Luke Durham	Not held	Deta Hedman	Scott Mitchell	N/A	N/A	Anastasia Dobromyslova & Darryl Fitton	Rachel Brooks & Deta Hedman	Darryl Fitton & Tony O'Shea	Darren Clifford
2017	Deta Hedman	Martin Phillips	Bradley Brooks	Not held	Corrine Hammond	Jamie Hughes	N/A	N/A	Deta Hedman, Dan Day & Conan Whitehead	Aileen de Graaf & Sharon Prins	Conan Whitehead & Jim Williams	N/A
2018	Fallon Sherrock	Glen Durrant	Beau Greaves	Not held	Lisa Ashton	Mark McGeeney	Lisa Ashton	Dave Parletti	Anca Zijlstra, Youeri Duijster, Jeffrey Van Egdom & Michael Unterbuchner	Casey Gallagher & Fallon Sherrock	Paul Hogan & Jason Heaver	N/A
2019	Laura Turner	Scott Waites	Luke Littler	Not held	Lorraine Winstanley	Richard Veenstra	Lisa Ashton	Wesley Harms	Lisa Ashton, Martin Atkins, David Evans & Lee Shewan	Casey Gallagher & Fallon Sherrock	Andy Jenkins & Rob Collins	N/A
2020	Fallon Sherrock	Michael Warburton	Luke Littler		Fallon Sherrock	Cameron Menzies	Fallon Sherrock	Thibault Tricole	Laura Turner & Aaron Turner	Casey Gallagher & Fallon Sherrock	Mark Fletcher & Ken Waters	N/A
2021	Cancelled due to COVID-19 pandemic											
2022	Beau Greaves	Dave Prins	Luke Littler	Amy Evans	Beau Greaves	James Hurrell	Beau Greaves	Ryan Hoggarth	Deta Hedman & Neil Duff	Zoe Holland & Dawn Shaw	Darren Johnson & Martyn Turner	N/A
2023	Beau Greaves	Martyn Turner	Luke Littler	Paige Pauling	Beau Greaves	Luke Littler	Beau Greaves	Barry Copeland	N/A	N/A	N/A	N/A
2024	Beau Greaves	Carl Wilkinson	Lewis Bell	Sophie McKinlay	Beau Greaves	Carl Wilkinson	Vicky Pruim	Jim McEwan	N/A	Anca Zijlstra & Rhian O'Sullivan	N/A	N/A
2025	Eve Watson	Christian Perez	Ethan Baines	N/A	Eve Watson	Jim McEwan	Deta Hedman	Paul Hogan	Deta's Team	Roz Hemmings & Lynne Marsden	Paul Goodwin & Ryan Ayres	N/A

=== England Youth Grand Prix Grand Finals ===
Year	Girls' singles	Boys' singles
2018	Beau Greaves	Mitchell McCarthy
2019	Hannah Meadwell	Luke Littler
2022	Paige Pauling	Luke Littler

=== England Youth Grand Prix of Darts regional qualification events ===
Date	Venue	County	Mixed event winner	Mixed event runner up	Girls' event winner	Girls' event runner up
4 February 2018	ClubCue Leisure, Worthing	Sussex	Brad Phillips	Dan Perry	Shannon Reeves	PJ Langridge
4 February 2018	Transport Club, Rotherham	Yorkshire	Beau Greaves	Connor Arberry	Beau Greaves	Natasha Kennedy
6 May 2018	Whitehouse Unique, Ashington	Northumberland	Beau Greaves	Cameron Nicholson	Beau Greaves	Iyla Leightley
17 June 2018	Embassy Club, Selsey	Sussex	Connor Arberry	Jack Vincent	Beau Greaves	Shannon Reeves
29 July 2018	Spots & Stripes, London	London	Tavis Dudeney	Mitchell McCarthy	Shannon Reeves	Holly Meadwell
5 August 2018	Thornaby Sports & Social Club, Thornaby	Cleveland	Beau Greaves	Mitchell McCarthy	Beau Greaves	Holly Meadwell
26 August 2018	Teams Club, Gateshead	Tyne & Wear	Jack Male	Brad Phillips	Beau Greaves	Natasha Kennedy
8 September 2018	Embassy Club, Selsey	Sussex	Connor Arberry	Sam Cromwell	Beau Greaves	Ashleigh Turner
3 February 2019	Bitterne Park Social Club, Southampton	Hampshire	Lewis Gurney	Keelan Kay	Holly Meadwell	Hannah Meadwell
3 February 2019	Glasshoughton WMC, Castleford	Yorkshire	Luke Littler	Connor Arberry	Beau Greaves	Natasha Kennedy
9 March 2019	Villa Marina, Douglas	Isle of Man	Luke Littler	Beau Greaves	Beau Greaves	Neve Turner
14 April 2019	Lennons Snooker Club, Chesterfield	Derbyshire	Jack Male	Brad Phillips	Beau Greaves	Rosie O'Connor
5 May 2019	Shamrock Club, Welwyn Garden City	Hertfordshire	Brad Phillips	Tavis Dudeney	Hannah Meadwell	Ashleigh Turner
5 May 2019	Willington WMC, Crook	County Durham	Beau Greaves	Jack Male	Beau Greaves	Lauren Stokoe
26 May 2019	GER Sports & Social Club, March	Cambridgeshire	Leighton Bennett	Connor Arberry	Hannah Meadwell	Holly Meadwell
15 June 2019	White Horse Complex, Selsey	Sussex	Beau Greaves	Leighton Bennett	Beau Greaves	Shannon Reeves
7 July 2019	Patchway Labour Club, Bristol	West of England	Keelan Kay	Lewis Gurney	Shannon Reeves	Rosie O'Connor
7 July 2019	New Trinity Club, Hull	Humberside	Leighton Bennett	Charlie Manby	Lauren Stokoe	Natasha Kennedy
28 July 2019	Barratts Club, Northampton	Northamptonshire	Jack Male	Luke Littler	Shannon Reeves	Rosie O'Connor
11 August 2019	The Crucible, Newbury	Berkshire	Nathan Potter	Lennon Craddock	Rosie O'Connor	Ashleigh Turner
11 August 2019	Beechwood Club, Blackburn	Lancashire	Luke Littler	Jack Male	Eleanor Cairns	Natasha Kennedy
8 September 2019	White Horse Complex, Selsey	Sussex	Beau Greaves	Freddie Box	Beau Greaves	Alex Dorney
2 February 2020	Manhattan Snooker Club, Harrogate	Yorkshire	Nathan Potter	Maison Wilson	Eleanor Cairns	Natasha Kennedy
22 February 2020	Clubcue Leisure, Worthing	Sussex	Luke Littler	Reece Pauling	Ella Williams	Paige Pauling
15 March 2020	Villa Marina. Douglas	Isle of Man	Luke Littler	Charlie Manby	Sophie McKinlay	Eleanor Cairns
4 July 2021	Cueball Club, Derby	Derbyshire	Tavis Dudeney	Eleanor Cairns	Eleanor Cairns	Ashleigh Turner
1 August 2021	Belgrave Sports & Social Club, Tamworth	Staffordshire	Leighton Bennett	Archie Self	Amy Evans	Hannah Meek
15 August 2021	Coppenhall WMC, Crewe	Cheshire	Luke Littler	Cayden Smith	Eleanor Cairns	Paige Pauling
5 September 2021	Haywards Heath Social Club, Haywards Heath	Sussex	Luke Littler	Tavis Dudeney	Ashleigh Turner	Kacie O'Connor
12 September 2021	White Horse Complex, Selsey	Sussex	Luke Littler	Tavis Dudeney	Paige Pauling	Ella Williams

=== England Youth Girls Pentathlon ===
Year	Date	Venue	1st	2nd	3rd	4th	5th	6th	7th	8th	9th	10th
2019	7 December 2019	New Trinity Club, Hull	Beau Greaves 205	Shannon Reeves 134	Ashleigh Turner 95	Holly Meadwell 93	Rosie O'Connor	Hannah Meadwell 87	Ellie Larsson-Brown 74	Alex Dorney 73	Lauren Stokoe 51	Aleisha Blakestone 26

=== England Youth Boys Pentathlon ===
Year	Date	Venue	1st	2nd	3rd	4th	5th	6th	7th	8th	9th	10th
2019	7 December 2019	New Trinity Club, Hull	Charlie Manby 203	Luke Littler 201	Connor Arberry 199	Brad Phillips 185	Jack Male 169	George Lynch 168	Nathan Potter 166	Tavis Dudeney 165	Mitchell McCarthy 87	TJ Wells 83

=== England Online Youth Grand Prix Series ===
Owing to the COVID-19 Pandemic putting normal darts events off the calendar for 2020 and the start of 2021 affected also, England Darts Organisation had decided to run a few online initiatives to encourage Youth Players and to provide a form guide leading to the international events in late 2021.

Boys Event

Grand Prix Event	Date	Winner	Average	Score	Average	Runner up
OGPS Event 1	17 January 2021	Henry Coates (England)	84.85	5-1	78.73	Rajmund Papp (Hungary)
OGPS Event 2	24 January 2021	Luke Littler (England)	86.73	5-3	82.58	Reece Pauling (England)
OGPS Event 3	31 January 2021	Harry Gregory (England)	84.82	5-4	83.59	Rajmund Papp (Hungary)
OGPS Event 4	7 February 2021	Luke Littler (England)	87.94	5-1	80.17	Henry Coates (England)
Grand Finals	14 February 2021	Luke Littler (England)	89.68	6-2	78.92	Harry Gregory (England)

Girls Event

Grand Prix Event	Date	Winner	Average	Score	Average	Runner up
OGPS Event 1	17 January 2021	Ksenia Klochek (Russia)	74.48	5-3	65.64	Eleanor Cairns (England)
OGPS Event 2	24 January 2021	Ksenia Klochek (Russia)	72.99	5-3	67.94	Lauren Stokoe (England)
OGPS Event 3	31 January 2021	Lauren Stokoe (England)	67.22	5-2	58.18	Tamara Kovacs (Hungary)
OGPS Event 4	7 February 2021	Lauren Stokoe (England)	66.38	5-1	60.21	Eleanor Cairns (England)
Grand Finals	14 February 2021	Ksenia Klochek (Russia)	69.54	6-5	75.42	Lauren Stokoe (England)

== England Youth Diamond League ==
Another initiative during the COVID-19 pandemic for the youth players was the England Youth Diamond League. This three-stage tournament began with qualifying tournaments. The winners qualified for stage 2, the league stage, which contained eight boys and six girls. The top four boys and girls progressed to the finals stage. There was a £1,200 prize fund. The qualifying events took place in February 2021 and the finals stage in March 2021.

=== Boys' qualifying events ===
	Date	Winner	Average	Score	Average	Runner up
Qualifier 1	21 February 2021	Luke Littler (England)	84.68	4-0	77.30	Henry Coates (England)
Qualifier 2	21 February 2021	Nathan Potter (England)	87.68	4-2	81.00	Henry Coates (England)
Qualifier 3	27 February 2021	Henry Coates (England)	78.08	4-0	65.72	Leo Beechey (England)
Qualifier 4	27 February 2021	Harry Gregory (England)	73.47	4-3	71.27	Tavis Dudeney (England)
Qualifier 5	28 February 2021	Lukas Jensen (Denmark)	62.63	4-0	59.42	Lewis Mayes (England)
England Members Qualifier	28 February 2021	Nathan Bell (England)	72.02	4-3	66.97	Leo Beechey (England)

=== Wildcard entries ===
The field for the Diamond League Group stage was topped up with two more wildcards, who were chosen based on their performances during the qualifying events. The two players chosen were:

- Tavis Dudeney (England)
- Leo Beechey (England)

=== Boys' group stages ===
Position	Player	Played	Won	Drawn	Lost	Legs for	Legs against	Leg difference	Points
1	Luke Littler (England)	7	7	0	0	28	7	+21	14
2	Nathan Potter (England)	7	5	1	1	23	13	+10	11
3	Henry Coates (England)	7	4	2	1	23	15	+8	10
4	Harry Gregory (England)	7	2	3	2	19	20	-1	7
5	Leo Beechey (England)	7	3	0	4	18	16	+2	6
6	Nathan Bell (England)	7	2	0	5	13	20	-7	4
7	Tavis Dudeney (England)	7	1	1	5	11	25	-14	3
8	Lukas Jensen (Denmark)	7	0	1	6	8	27	-19	1

=== Boys' knockout stages ===
Semi-finals
1	Luke Littler (96.54)	5
4	Harry Gregory (86.28)	3
2	Nathan Potter (70.82)	4
3	Henry Coates (71.62)	5

Final
1	Luke Littler (92.55)	6
3	Henry Coates (77.63)	2

=== Girls' qualifying events ===
	Date	Winner	Average	Score	Average	Runner up
Qualifier 1	21 February 2021	Eleanor Cairns (England)	63.46	4-3	64.38	Lauren Stokoe (England)
Qualifier 2	21 February 2021	Rosie O'Connor (England)	47.66	4-3	47.74	Ffion Leigh-James (Wales)
Qualifier 3	28 February 2021	Lauren Stokoe (England)	51.38	4-0	41.41	Katie Latham (England)
England Members Qualifier	28 February 2021	Katie Latham (England)	30.32	4-3	31.49	Krystal O'Connor (England)

=== Wildcard Entries ===
The field for the Diamond League Group stage was topped up with two more Wildcards who were chosen based on their performances during the Qualifying Events, the two players chosen were:

Ffion Leigh-James (Wales)

Krystal O'Connor (England)

=== Girls Group Stages ===
Position	Player	Played	Won	Drawn	Lost	Legs For	Legs Against	Leg Difference	Points
1	Lauren Stokoe (England)	5	5	0	0	20	3	+17	10
2	Eleanor Cairns (England)	5	4	0	1	18	4	+14	8
3	Rosie O'Connor (England)	5	3	0	2	13	11	+2	6
4	Ffion Leigh-James (Wales)	5	1	1	3	8	16	-8	3
5	Katie Latham (England)	5	0	2	3	7	18	-11	2
6	Krystal O'Connor (England)	5	0	1	4	5	19	-14	1

=== Girls Knockout Stages ===
Semi-finals
1	Lauren Stokoe (64.65)	4
4	Ffion Leigh-James (47.67)	0
2	Eleanor Cairns (51.83)	4
3	Rosie O'Connor (45.11)	0

Final
1	Lauren Stokoe (64.33)	5
2	Eleanor Cairns (59.15)	1

=== Boys' England Youth Grand Prix Series 2025 ===
	Date	Winner	Average	Score	Average	Runner up
Qualifier 1	25 May 2025	Mason Teese (England)	69.02	5-3	71.02	Jake Shipley (England)
England Open	7th June 2025	TBC (England)	00.00	0-0	00.00	TBC (England)
Qualifier 2	29th June 2025	TBC (England)	00.00	0-0	00.00	TBC (England)
Qualifier 3	13th July 2025	TBC (England)	00.00	0-0	00.00	TBC (England)
Qualifier 4	21st July 2025	TBC (England)	00.00	0-0	00.00	TBC (England)
Qualifier 5	24th August 2025	TBC (England)	00.00	0-0	00.00	TBC (England)
Qualifier 6	7th September 2025	TBC (England)	00.00	0-0	00.00	TBC (England)
British Open	20th September 2025	TBC (England)	00.00	0-0	00.00	TBC (England)
England Classic Open	11th October 2025	TBC (England)	00.00	0-0	00.00	TBC (England)

=== Girls' England Youth Grand Prix Series 2025 ===
	Date	Winner	Average	Score	Average	Runner up
Qualifier 1	25 May 2025	Paige Pauline (England)	69.09	5-1	56.83	Lexi-Jayne Rooksby (England)
England Open	7th June 2025	TBC (England)	00.00	0-0	00.00	TBC (England)
Qualifier 2	29th June 2025	TBC (England)	00.00	0-0	00.00	TBC (England)
Qualifier 3	13th July 2025	TBC (England)	00.00	0-0	00.00	TBC (England)
Qualifier 4	21st July 2025	TBC (England)	00.00	0-0	00.00	TBC (England)
Qualifier 5	24th August 2025	TBC (England)	00.00	0-0	00.00	TBC (England)
Qualifier 6	7th September 2025	TBC (England)	00.00	0-0	00.00	TBC (England)
British Open	20th September 2025	TBC (England)	00.00	0-0	00.00	TBC (England)
England Classic Open	11th October 2025	TBC (England)	00.00	0-0	00.00	TBC (England)

== Player appearances for England ==
=== England Youth Development team ===
Player	County	Hungary P - W	Rep. Ireland P - W	Total P - W
Callum Beddow	Cleveland	1 - 1	1 - 1	2 - 2
Jack Bird	Suffolk	1 - 1		1 - 1
Jack Nankervis	Devon		1 - 1	1 - 1
Oliver Atkinson	Lancashire	1 - 0		1 - 0
Krystal O'Connor	Warwickshire	1 - 0		1 - 0

=== Youth girls ===
Player	County	Europe P - W	Holland P - W	Hungary P - W	Rep. Ireland P - W	Russia P - W	Scotland P - W	Wales P - W	Total P - W
Beau Greaves	Yorkshire					1 - 1	5 - 5	5 - 5	11 - 11
Shan Reeves	Bristol						4 - 1	4 - 3	8 - 4
Casey Gallagher	Sussex						3 - 3	3 - 3	6 - 6
Danielle Ashton	Lancashire						3 - 2	3 - 3	6 - 5
Eleanor Cairns	Lancashire			1 - 1	1 - 1	1 - 1			3 - 3
Lauren Stokoe	County Durham			1 - 1	1 - 1	1 - 1			3 - 3
Felicia Blay	Bedfordshire						1 - 1	1 - 1	2 - 2
Natasha Eaves	Lancashire						1 - 1	1 - 1	2 - 2
Amy Evans	Clwyd			1 - 1	1 - 1				2 - 2
Josie Paterson	Yorkshire						1 - 1	1 - 1	2 - 2
Fallon Sherrock	Bedfordshire						1 - 1	1 - 1	2 - 2
Harriet Wolton	Suffolk	1 - 1	1 - 0						2 - 1
Chelsea Williamson	London						1 - 1	1 - 0	2 - 1
Rosie O'Connor	Warwickshire			1 - 0		1 - 0			2 - 0
Katie Latham	Cornwall				1 - 1				1 - 1
Kellie Hammond	Sussex		1 - 0						1 - 0
Tyrian Jesse	Cornwall	1 - 0							1 - 0

=== Youth boys ===
Player	County	Europe P - W	Holland P - W	Hungary P - W	Rep. Ireland P - W	Russia P - W	Scotland P - W	Wales P - W	Total P - W
Keelan Kay	Devon						3 - 2	3 - 3	6 - 5
Brad Phillips	Hertfordshire						3 - 1	3 - 3	6 - 4
Josh McCarthy	Wiltshire						3 - 2	3 - 1	6 - 3
Jack Vincent	Buckinghamshire						3 - 1	3 - 2	6 - 3
Luke Littler	Merseyside			1 - 1	1 - 1	1 - 1	1 - 1	1 - 1	5 - 5
Tavis Dudeney	Sussex			1 - 1	1 - 0	1 - 0	1 - 1	1 - 0	5 - 2
Nathan Potter	Suffolk				1 - 1	1 - 1	1 - 1	1 - 1	4 - 4
Connor Levett	Sussex						2 - 2	2 - 1	4 - 3
Owen Maiden	West Midlands						2 - 1	2 - 2	4 - 3
Jordan Singh	West Midlands						2 - 2	2 - 1	4 - 3
Bradley Halls	Essex						2 - 2	2 - 0	4 - 2
Leo Beechey	Buckinghamshire			1 - 0	1 - 1	1 - 1			3 - 2
David Pallett	Shropshire	2 - 2	1 - 0						3 - 2
Dan Perry	Hampshire						2 - 1	1 - 0	3 - 1
Alex Gurr	Sussex						1 - 0	2 - 0	3 - 0
Arron Fairweather	Suffolk						1 - 1	1 - 1	2 - 2
Leighton Bennett	Yorkshire						1 - 1	1 - 1	2 - 2
Chris Gower	Essex						1 - 1	1 - 1	2 - 2
Jake Jones	Staffordshire						1 - 1	1 - 1	2 - 2
George Killington	London						1 - 1	1 - 1	2 - 2
Tyler Radlett	Surrey						1 - 1	1 - 1	2 - 2
Olly Raywood	Humberside			1 - 1	1 - 1				2 - 2
Callan Rydz	County Durham						1 - 1	1 - 1	2 - 2
Evan Willoughby	Berkshire			1 - 1	1 - 1				2 - 2
Craig Brown	Isle of Wight						1 - 0	1 - 1	2 - 1
Zac Cross	Wiltshire						1 - 1	1 - 0	2 - 1
Thomas Chant	Hampshire						1 - 0	1 - 1	2 - 1
James Jennings	Essex	2 - 1							2 - 1
Mitchell McCarthy	Bristol						1 - 1	1 - 0	2 - 1
Mason Riou	Hampshire						1 - 0	1 - 1	2 - 1
Archie Self	Berkshire			1 - 1	1 - 0				2 - 1
Nathan Street	Hampshire						1 - 0	1 - 1	2 - 1
Thomas Banks	Hertfordshire				1 - 1				1 - 1
Jarred Cole	Hertfordshire						1 - 1		1 - 1
Richie George	Essex		1 - 1						1 - 1
Ross Smith	Kent		1 - 1						1 - 1
Nathan Bell	County Durham			1 - 0					1 - 0
Jimmy Bristow	Bristol							1 - 0	1 - 0
Ricky Evans	Northamptonshire		1 - 0						1 - 0
Lewis Mayes	County Durham			1 - 0					1 - 0

=== Senior ladies ===
Ladies							
		Holland	N. Ireland	Rep. Ireland	Scotland	Wales	Total
Player	County	P – W	P – W	P – W	P – W	P – W	P – W
Trina Gulliver	Warwickshire	5 – 4	5 – 5	4 – 3	27 - 25	30 - 23	71 - 61
Deta Hedman	Oxfordshire	5 - 5	4 - 4	3 - 3	19 - 17	24 - 19	55 - 48
Lisa Ashton	Lancashire	4 – 4	4 – 4	4 – 4	15 – 14	17 – 15	44 – 41
Lorraine Winstanley	Yorkshire	6 - 5	5 - 5	3 – 3	13 - 12	16 - 11	42 - 36
Apylee Jones	Surrey	2 – 1			11 – 10	13 – 9	26 – 20
Karen Lawman	Yorkshire	1 – 0	1 – 1	1 – 1	11 – 10	11 – 7	25 – 19
Fallon Sherrock	Buckinghamshire	2 - 0	3 - 3	1 - 1	8 - 8	8 - 5	22 - 17
Mandy Solomons	London				9 – 6	12 – 8	21 – 14
Linda Duffy	London				10 – 8	10 – 9	20 – 17
Sharon Colclough	Middlesex		1 – 1	1 – 1	8 – 6	10 – 5	20 – 13
Clare Bywaters	Oxfordshire	2 – 2			7 – 6	9 – 6	18 – 14
Tricia Wright	Surrey	2 – 1			7 – 6	7 – 3	16 – 10
Sue Edwards	Avon		1 – 1	1 – 1	6 – 3	7 – 4	15 – 9
Maureen Flowers	Staffordshire				7 – 6	7 – 6	14 – 12
Claire Brookin	Cambridgeshire	1 – 1			5 – 5	6 – 4	12 – 10
Sharon Kemp	Suffolk				6 – 5	6 – 3	12 – 8
Jayne Kempster	Dorset				4 – 2	4 – 4	8 – 6
Maria O'Brien	Devon		2 - 1		3 - 3	3 - 2	8 - 6
Tammy Montgomery	Yorkshire				4 – 4	3 – 2	7 – 6
Karen Littler	Somerset	1 – 1			2 – 2	3 – 3	6 – 6
Pauline Dyer	Middlesex		1 – 1	1 – 1	2 – 2	2 – 1	6 – 5
Crissy Manley	Cumbria				3 – 1	3 – 3	6 – 4
Linda Smith	Staffordshire				3 – 2	3 – 1	6 – 3
Marie Geaney	Somerset		1 – 1		2 – 2	2 – 2	5 – 5
Margaret Lally	Lancashire				3 – 3	2 – 2	5 – 5
Wendy Caddick	Yorkshire				2 – 1	3 – 3	5 – 4
Jean Dickinson	Cheshire				2 – 2	3 – 1	5 – 3
Viv Dundon	Essex				2 – 2	3 – 1	5 – 3
Sue Talbot	Suffolk				2 – 2	3 – 1	5 – 3
Dawn Standley	Norfolk	1 – 1			2 – 2	3 – 1	5 – 3
Brenda Simpson	Derbyshire				3 – 2	2 – 0	5 – 2
Sandy Earnshaw	Lancashire				2 – 1	2 – 1	4 – 2
Zoe Jones	Worcestershire				2 – 1	2 – 1	4 – 2
Debra Royal	Lincolnshire				2 – 1	2 – 1	4 – 2
Kathy Wones	Norfolk				2 – 1	2 – 1	4 – 2
Sonja Ralphs-Smith	Surrey				2 – 0	2 – 1	4 – 1
Pat Connaughton	Lancashire				2 – 2	1 – 1	3 – 3
Casey Gallagher	Sussex				1 - 1	1 - 1	2 - 2
Ann Westwood	Lancashire				1 – 0	2 – 2	3 – 2
Sandy Wadsworth	Derbyshire				2 – 0	1 – 1	3 – 1
Annie Armour	Hampshire		1 – 1	1 – 1			2 – 2
Nadine Bentley	Cambridgeshire	1 – 1			1 – 1		2 – 2
Audrie Derham	Devon				1 – 1	1 – 1	2 – 2
Lisa Munt	Surrey		1 – 1			1 – 1	2 – 2
Deanna Goddard	Suffolk				1 – 1	1 – 0	2 – 1
Rhoda Harby	Hampshire				1 – 0	1 – 1	2 – 1
Gemma Hayter	Hampshire				1 – 1	1 – 0	2 – 1
Irene Kendrick	Gloucestershire				1 – 1	1 – 0	2 – 1
Louise Perry	Avon		1 – 1		1 – 0		2 – 1
Jane Phillips	Hertfordshire		1 – 0	1 – 1			2 – 1
Pat Piper	Kent				1 – 1	1 – 0	2 – 1
Sue Plenderleith	Devon				1 – 1	1 – 0	2 – 1
Sarah Roberts	West Midlands				1 – 1	1 – 0	2 – 1
Gwen Sutton	Cleveland				1 – 1	1 – 0	2 – 1
Sue Gulliver	Warwickshire	1 – 0				1 – 0	2 – 0
Jane Stubbs	Cheshire				2 – 0		2 – 0
Sue Corry	Lancashire				1 – 1		1 – 1
Merryl Dennis	Devon				1 – 1		1 – 1
Sherrie (Dodd) Yeomans	Cheshire				1 – 1		1 – 1
Sally (Dowell) Rose	Kent				1 -1		1 – 1
Barbara (Lee) Greatbatch	Cambridgeshire					1 – 1	1 – 1
Amanda Abbott	Cambridgeshire				1 – 1		1 – 1
Toni Rundle	Cornwall		1 – 1				1 – 1
Carole Wright	Northumberland				1 – 1		1 – 1
Lynne Stewart	Cheshire					1 – 0	1 – 0
Cathy Waddell	Cleveland				1 – 0		1 – 0

A name in brackets indicates the name that they played under, followed by their married name.

=== Senior men ===
Men							Total
		Holland	N. Ireland	Rep. Ireland	Scotland	Wales	
Player	County	P – W	P – W	P – W	P – W	P – W	P – W
Martin Adams	Cambridgeshire	12 – 8	11 – 9	8 – 7	35 – 22	39 – 28	105 – 74
Tony O'Shea	Cheshire	11 – 9	9 – 7	6 – 4	26 – 21	24 – 18	76 – 59
John Lowe	Derbyshire		5 – 5	8 – 7	28 – 21	28 – 23	69 – 56
Eric Bristow	Merseyside		5 – 5	6 – 5	27 – 22	27 – 24	65 – 56
John Walton	Yorkshire	8 – 5	5 – 5	4 – 2	22 – 15	18 – 13	57 – 40
Cliff Lazarenko	Surrey		4 – 4	5 – 3	22 – 18	22 – 14	53 – 39
Scott Waites	Yorkshire	9 – 4	6 – 4	4 – 4	13 – 8	13 – 11	45 – 31
Martin Atkins	Yorkshire	8 – 6	5 – 4	3 – 3	12 – 6	15 – 12	43 – 31
Dave Whitcombe	London		2 – 1	3 – 3	20 – 13	18 – 10	43 – 27
Mervyn King	Humberside	3 – 2	5 – 5	4 – 4	13 – 9	16 – 14	41 – 34
Scott Mitchell	Dorset	3 – 2	3 – 3	4 – 3	12 – 9	14 – 11	36 – 28
Andy Fordham	Kent	1 – 1	2 – 0	1 – 1	16 – 7	14 – 12	34 – 21
Bob Anderson	Surrey		1 – 1	1 – 1	15 – 10	16 – 11	33 – 23
Bill Lennard	Lancashire		1 – 1	7 – 3	12 – 7	13 – 9	33 – 20
Garry Thompson	Yorkshire	6 – 3	3 – 3	2 – 1	8 – 5	9 – 5	28 – 17
Ronnie Baxter	Lancashire		2 – 2	2 – 2	11 – 8	12 – 10	27 – 22
Alan Glazier	Lancashire			5 – 5	12 – 8	10 – 5	27 – 18
Mike Gregory	Somerset		2 – 1	1 – 0	13 – 10	11 – 7	27 – 18
Steve Beaton	London		1 – 0	1 – 0	10 – 9	14 – 9	26 – 18
Mark McGeeney	Yorkshire	2 – 1	2 – 2	3 – 3	8 – 7	11 – 9	26 – 22
Bobby George	London		3 – 3	2 – 2	9 – 9	11 – 4	25 – 18
Steve Farmer	West Midlands	4 – 2	2 – 2	1 – 0	9 – 6	8 – 6	24 – 16
Tony Brown	Kent		1 – 1	4 – 2	11 – 7	7 – 5	23 – 15
Paul Hogan	Berkshire	1 – 0	1 – 1	1 – 1	17 – 7	9 – 6	23 – 15
Glen Durrant	Cleveland	3 – 3	2 – 2	3 -3	6 – 5	7 – 7	21 – 20
Kevin Painter	Essex		3 – 3	1 – 1	7 – 7	10 – 5	21 – 16
Les Capewell	Staffordshire		2 – 1	1 – 1	9 – 7	9 – 6	21 – 15
Darryl Fitton	Cheshire	2 – 1	3 – 1	1 – 0	8 – 6	6 -3	20 – 11
Dave Lee	London		1 – 1		9 – 5	10 – 3	20 – 9
Denis Ovens	Hertfordshire		2 – 1	1 – 1	8 – 7	8 – 7	19 – 16
Doug McCarthy	County Durham		1 – 1	1 – 1	8 – 4	9 – 7	19 – 13
Alan Warriner-Little	Lancashire			2 – 1	8 – 6	8 – 6	18 – 13
Charlie Ellix	London			4 – 4	8 – 5	6 – 2	18 – 11
Jamie Hughes	Warwickshire	1 – 1	1 – 1	2 – 2	5 – 5	8 – 6	17 – 15
Peter Evison	London			2 – 1	7 – 6	8 – 6	17 – 13
Paul Gosling	Cornwall			3 – 1	5 – 4	9 – 4	17 – 9
Ian Brand	Cambridgeshire	1 – 1	2 – 0	2 – 0	6 – 6	5 – 4	16 – 11
Keith Deller	Suffolk		1 – 0		7 – 7	7 – 4	15 – 11
James Hurrell	Gloucestershire	1 – 1	1 – 1	2 – 1	4 – 3	6 – 4	14 – 10
Tony Eccles	Cheshire	4 – 2		1 – 0	5 – 4	4 – 3	14 – 9
Dennis Harbour	Cambridgeshire	1 – 0		1 – 0	6 – 5	6 – 3	14 – 8
Shaun Greatbatch	Cambridgeshire		3 – 1	1 – 1	5 – 3	4 – 4	13 – 9
Kevin Kenny	Merseyside		1 – 1	1 – 1	4 – 3	6 – 6	12 – 11
Andy Jenkins	Hampshire		1 – 1		5 – 5	6 – 4	12 -10
Ted Hankey	Shropshire		1 – 1		5 – 3	6 – 4	12 – 8
James Wilson	Yorkshire	1 – 1	2 – 1	1 – 1	4 – 4	3 – 3	11 – 10
Dave Askew	Surrey				5 – 3	6 – 5	11 – 8
Joe Dodd	Buckinghamshire		2 – 2		5 – 3	4 – 3	11 – 8
Stephen Bunting	Cheshire	1 – 1			5 – 3	5 – 2	11 – 6
Dennis Hickling	Yorkshire				6 – 3	5 – 3	11 – 6
Colin Monk	Hampshire		1 – 1		4 – 2	6 – 3	11 – 6
Steve Coote	Cheshire				4 – 2	6 – 2	10 – 4
Ritchie Gardner	Surrey				4 – 2	6 – 2	10 – 4
Phil Taylor	Staffordshire				5 – 3	4 – 3	9 – 6
Brian Vaux	Warwickshire			3 – 2	3 – 1	3 – 3	9 – 6
George Simmons	Kent			2 – 2	3 – 2	4 – 1	9 – 5
Davy Richardson	Northumberland				4 – 1	5 – 2	9 – 3
Cliff Inglis	Cheshire			2 – 2	3 – 2	3 – 3	8 – 7
Cyril Hayes	Avon			3 – 3	2 – 0	3 – 3	8 – 6
Albie Brown	Merseyside				4 – 3	4 – 2	8 – 5
Andy Hayfield	London		1 – 1	1 – 1	3 – 2	3 – 1	8 – 5
Robbie Green	Merseyside				4 – 1	4 – 3	8 – 4
Wayne Mardle	Essex				4 – 3	4 – 1	8 – 4
Roy Brown	Hampshire	2 – 0			3 – 1	3 – 1	8 – 2
Ken Summers	Cambridgeshire				3 – 2	4 – 4	7 – 6
Stuart Holden	Yorkshire		1 – 1		3 – 3	3 – 1	7 – 5
Phill Nixon	County Durham	2 – 2			2 – 0	3 – 3	7 – 5
Eric Parkinson	Lancashire				3 – 3	4 – 2	7 – 5
Paul Reynolds	Lancashire				3 – 2	4 – 3	7 – 5
Dennis Priestley	Yorkshire				3 – 1	4 – 3	7 – 4
Shayne Burgess	Kent			1 – 1	2 – 1	4 – 1	7 – 3
Ken Brown	Surrey			1 – 1	1 – 1	4 – 3	6 – 5
Ian Roe	Lancashire		1 – 1	1 – 1	2 – 2	2 – 1	6 – 5
Peter Chapman	London			2 – 0	1 – 1	3 – 1	6 – 1
Julian Bullock	Yorkshire		2 – 2	1 – 1	1 – 1	1 – 1	5 – 5
Paul Williams	Lancashire		1 – 1	1 – 1	2 – 2	1 – 1	5 – 5
Tommy Aldridge	Warwickshire	2 – 2			2 – 1	1 – 1	5 – 4
Steve Gittins	Shropshire				2 – 1	3 – 3	5 – 4
Tony Sontag	London				2 – 2	3 – 2	5 – 4
Ian White	Cheshire	2 – 1			1 – 1	2 – 1	5 – 3
Andy Gudgeon	Lancashire				2 – 0	3 – 2	5 – 2
Graham Collins	Yorkshire				2 – 1	3 – 0	5 – 1
David Copley	Yorkshire				2 – 2	2 – 2	4 – 4
Gene Raymond	Surrey				2 – 2	2 – 2	4 – 4
Chris Whiting	Gloucestershire				2 – 2	2 – 2	4 – 4
Kevin Spiolek	Cambridgeshire				2 – 2	2 – 1	4 – 3
Brian Dawson	Yorkshire				2 – 1	2 – 1	4 – 2
Vic Hubbard	Norfolk				2 – 1	2 – 1	4 – 2
Peter Spurdle	Somerset				2 – 1	2 – 1	4 – 2
John Corden	Derbyshire				2 – 0	2 – 1	4 – 1
Willie Etherington	Hertfordshire			2 – 0		2 – 1	4 – 1
Gerry Haywood	Yorkshire				2 – 1	2 – 0	4 – 1
Graham Miller	London				1 – 0	3 – 1	4 – 1
Darren Peetoom	Essex				2 – 0	2 – 1	4 – 1
Barry Noble	Humberside				1 – 1	2 – 2	3 – 3
Tommy O'Regan*	London			1 – 1	1 – 1	1 – 1	3 – 3
Colin Whiley	Sussex		1 – 1		1 – 1	1 – 1	3 – 3
Ray Battye	Yorkshire				2 – 2	1 – 0	3 – 2
Nijay Kumar	Humberside		1 – 1		1 – 0	1 – 1	3 – 2
Steve McCollum	Kent				2 – 1	1 – 1	3 – 2
Doug Priestner	Avon			1 – 1	1 – 1	1 – 0	3 – 2
Andy Beardmore	Staffordshire				1 – 0	2 – 1	3 – 1
Jim Beardsmore	Derbyshire				1 – 0	2 – 1	3 – 1
Nick Gedney	Warwickshire				2 – 0	1 – 1	3 – 1
Brian Langworth	Yorkshire				2 – 1	1 – 0	3 – 1
Ian Jones	West Midlands	2 – 1			1 – 0		3 – 1
Matt Clark	Kent				1 – 0	2 – 0	3 – 0
Shaun Carroll	West Midlands				1 – 1	1 – 1	2 – 2
Alan Cooper	Avon			1 – 1		1 – 1	2 – 2
Daniel Day	Essex				1 – 1	1 – 1	2 – 2
Kevin Dowling	Warwickshire				1 – 1	1 – 1	2 – 2
Colin Fowler	Worcestershire		1 – 1	1 – 1			2 – 2
Bob Lauder	County Durham				1 – 1	1 – 1	2 – 2
Chris Mason	London				1 – 1	1 – 1	2 – 2
Johnny Nicholls	London			1 – 1	1 – 1		2 – 2
Andy Smith	Worcestershire		1 – 1	1 – 1			2 – 2
David Pallett	Cheshire				1 – 1	1 – 1	2 – 2
Dennis Smith	Wiltshire				1 – 1	1 – 1	2 – 2
Colin Baker	London				1 – 0	1 – 1	2 – 1
Scott Baker	West Midlands				1 – 0	1 – 1	2 – 1
Mick Banyard	Cambridgeshire				1 – 1	1 – 0	2 – 1
Dave Chisnall	Lancashire				1 – 0	1 – 1	2 – 1
Barry 'Nobby' Clark	Lancashire			1 – 1		1 – 0	2 – 1
Mark Day	Buckinghamshire				1 – 0	1 – 1	2 – 1
George Ewart	Northumberland				1 – 1	1 – 0	2 – 1
Steve Douglas	London				2 – 1		2 – 1
Rod Harrington	Essex				1 – 0	1 – 1	2 – 1
Paul Harvey	Nottinghamshire				1 – 1	1 – 0	2 – 1
Michael Haynes	Cheshire				1 – 0	1 – 1	2 – 1
Nigel Heydon	Warwickshire				1 – 0	1 – 1	2 – 1
Steve Johnson	Essex				1 – 1	1 – 0	2 – 1
Ryan Joyce	Tyne & Wear				1 – 0	1 – 1	2 – 1
George Lee	London			1 – 0	1 – 1		2 – 1
Steve McNally	Merseyside			1 – 1	1 – 0		2 – 1
Dave Routledge	Cheshire				1 – 0	1 – 1	2 – 1
Rab Scott	Essex				1 – 1	1 – 0	2 – 1
Roger Smith	Avon			1 – 1		1 – 0	2 – 1
Gary Spedding	Cumbria		1 – 1		1 – 0		2 – 1
James Wade	Hampshire				1 – 1	1 – 0	2 – 1
George Walsh	Cheshire				1 – 1	1 – 0	2 – 1
Conan Whitehead	London				1 – 1	1 – 0	2 – 1
Gary Whiteley	Yorkshire		1 – 1	1 – 0			2 – 1
Dean Winstanley	Yorkshire				1 – 1	1 – 0	2 – 1
Paul Dawkins	Kent				1 – 0	1 – 0	2 – 0
Paul Doggett	London				1 – 0	1 – 0	2 – 0
Ian Carpenter	Kent				1 – 0	1 – 0	2 – 0
John Garner	Cambridgeshire				1 – 0	1 – 0	2 – 0
Joe Matthews	Cleveland				1 – 0	1 – 0	2 – 0
Dave Parletti	Surrey				1 – 0	1 – 0	2 – 0
Gary Robson	Cheshire				1 – 0	1 – 0	2 – 0
Bryan Smart	Lancashire					2 – 0	2 – 0
Lewis Venes	London				1 – 0	1 – 0	2 – 0
John Walls	Northumberland				1 – 0	1 – 0	2 – 0
Tony West	Hertfordshire				1 – 0	1 – 0	2 – 0
Andy Boulton	West Ayrshire				1 – 1		1 – 1
Ged Harrop	Hampshire				1 – 1		1 – 1
Ray Lawrence	Lancashire				1 – 1		1 – 1
Chic Love	Kent				1 – 1		1 – 1
Colin Mayes	Warwickshire					1 – 1	1 – 1
Roy Prestidge	Staffordshire					1 – 1	1 – 1
Terry Rose	Kent			1 – 1			1 – 1
Ian Sarfas	Essex				1 – 1		1 – 1
Ron Tait	County Durham				1 – 1		1 – 1
Jeff Williams	Avon				1 – 1		1 – 1
Tony Bell	Hertfordshire				1 – 0		1 – 0
Pip Blackwell	Kent					1 – 0	1 – 0
Mick Brooks	Merseyside		1 – 0				1 – 0
Joe Bunce	Lancashire				1 – 0		1 – 0
Arnie Bunn	Warwickshire				1 – 0		1 – 0
John Cosnett	West Midlands					1 – 0	1 – 0
Ronnie Davis	Northumberland				1 – 0		1 – 0
Brian Derbyshire	Cheshire				1 – 0		1 – 0
Barry Done	Merseyside					1 – 0	1 – 0
Les Fitton	Lancashire				1 – 0		1 – 0
Terry Fowle	Cambridgeshire				1 – 0		1 – 0
Jamie Robinson	Essex					1 – 0	1 – 0
Kevin Simm	Cheshire					1 – 0	1 – 0
Lionel Smith	Staffordshire				1 – 0		1 – 0
Richard Smith	Cumbria				1 – 0		1 – 0
John Stanton	Lincolnshire			1 – 0			1 – 0
Sammy Wright	Cheshire		1 – 0				1 – 0

Note: O'Regan was the first captain of an England team and also captained Ireland, his country of birth.

== International performance of the national team since the formation of the England Darts Organisation in 2007 ==
Year	British Internationals				Six Nations				Europe Cup				World Cup		
	Men	Ladies	Boys	Girls	Men	Ladies	Boys	Girls	Men	Ladies	Boys	Girls	Men	Ladies	Youth
2025	Winners	R/Up	Winners	Winners	Winners	Winners	N/A	N/A	TBC	TBC	TBC	TBC	N\A	N\A	N\A
2024	Winners	Winners	Winners	Winners	R/Up	R/Up	TBC		Winners	Winners	Winners	Third	N\A	N\A	N\A
2023	Winners	Winners	Winners	Winners	Third	Winners	N/A		Winners	Winners	Winners	Third	N\A	N\A	N\A
2022	Winners	Winners	Winners	Winners	R/Up	R/Up	N/A		Winners	Winners	Winners	Winners	Winners	Winners	Winners
2019	Winners	Winners	Winners	R/up	Third	Winners	N/A				R/Up	Winners	Third	Winners	Winners
2018	Winners	Winners	R/up	Winners	Third	Winners	N/A		Winners	Winners	Third	Winners			
2017	Winners	R/up	Winners	Winners	Winners	Winners	N/A				R/up	Fifth			
2016	Third	Winners	Winners	Winners	Winners	Winners	N/A		R/up	Winners	Fifth	Winners			
2015	Winners	Winners	R/up	R/up	Winners	R/up	N/A				Fourth	Sixth	Winners	Winners	Third
2014	Winners	Winners	Winners	Winners	Winners	Winners	N/A		Winners	Winners	Tenth	Eighth			
2013	Winners	Winners	Winners	Winners	R/up	Third	N/A				Ninth	Winners	Winners	Winners	R/up
2012	Winners	Winners	R/up	Winners	Winners	Winners	N/A		Third	R/up	R/up	Winners			
2011	Winners	Winners	Winners	Winners	Winners	R/up	N/A				R/up	Winners	Winners	Winners	Winners
2010	Winners	Winners			Winners	Winners	N/A		Winners	Third	Winners				
2009	Winners	R/up			Winners		N/A					Winners	R/up	Winners	Fourth
2008	R/up	Winners			R/up		N/A				R/up				
2007	Winners	Winners			Winners		N/A				R/up	R/up	R/up	Fourteenth	R/up

== World Cup performance ==
Men's team
Year	Host	England team	Team event	Pairs A	Pairs B	Singles A	Singles B	Singles C	Singles D	Overall result
2007	Netherlands	Martin Adams, Steve Farmer, Tony O'Shea & John Walton	Winners 9-8 v Netherlands	Adams & Walton - semi-finals	Farmer & O'Shea - Last 64	Martin Adams - Last 16	Steve Farmer - Last 8	Tony O'Shea - Last 64	John Walton - Last 64	Runners up
2009	United States	Martin Adams, Darryl Fitton, Tony O'Shea & Scott Waites	Last 16 7-9 v Scotland	Adams & Waites - semi-finals	Fitton & O'Shea - Last 32	Martin Adams - Last 16	Darryl Fitton - Last 32	Tony O'Shea - Winner	Scott Waites - semi-finals	Runners up
2011	Ireland	Martin Adams, Martin C Atkins, Tony O'Shea & Scott Waites	Winners 9-8 v Finland	Adams & O'Shea - Winners	Atkins & Waites - Last 64	Martin Adams - Runner Up	Martin C Atkins - Last 256	Tony O'Shea - Last 128	Scott Waites - Winner	Winners
2013	Canada	Stephen Bunting, Glen Durrant, Tony O'Shea & Scott Waites	Semi Finals 2-9 v USA	Bunting & O'Shea - Winners	Durrant & Waites - semi-finals	Stephen Bunting - Runner Up	Glen Durrant - Last 64	Tony O'Shea - semi-finals	Scott Waites - Last 64	Winners
2015	Turkey	Glen Durrant, Jamie Hughes, Mark McGeeney & Scott Mitchell	Winners 9-4 v Rep of Ireland	Durrant & Hughes - Last 64	Mitchell & McGeeney - runners up	Glen Durrant - Last 32	Jamie Hughes - Last 64	Mark McGeeney - Last 128	Scott Mitchell - Last 64	Winners
2017	Japan	Did Not Attend	N/A	N/A	N/A	N/A	N/A	N/A	N/A	N/A
2019	Romania	Martin Atkins, Daniel Day, Nigel Heydon & Scott Mitchell	Semi Finals 5-9 v Hong Kong	Atkins & Heydon - Last 32	Day & Mitchell - runners up	Martin Atkins - Last 128	Daniel Day - Last 16	Nigel Heydon - Last 32	Scott Mitchell - Last 32	3rd
2023	Denmark	James Hurrell, Scott Mitchell, Reece Colley, Jamie Atkins	Runners up 7-9 Holland	Hurrell & Mitchell - Last 16	Reece & Atkins Last 64	James Hurrell Last 16	Reece Colley Last 32	Jamie Atkins Last 128	Scott Mitchell Last 256	4th

Women's team
Year	Host	England team	Team event	Pairs A	Pairs B	Singles A	Singles B	Singles C	Singles D	Overall result
2007	Netherlands	Trina Gulliver & Apylee Jones	N/A	Gulliver & Jones - Last 8	N/A	Trina Gulliver - Last 16	Apylee Jones - Last 32	N/A	N/A	14th
2009	United States	Lisa Ashton & Karen Lawman	N/A	Ashton & Lawman - Winners	N/A	Lisa Ashton - Last 8	Karen Lawman - Last 8	N/A	N/A	Winners
2011	Ireland	Trina Gulliver & Deta Hedman	N/A	Gulliver & Hedman - Winners	N/A	Trina Gulliver - Winner	Deta Hedman - semi-finals	N/A	N/A	Winners
2013	Canada	Trina Gulliver & Deta Hedman	N/A	Gulliver & Hedman - Winners	N/A	Trina Gulliver - Last 16	Deta Hedman - Winner	N/A	N/A	Winners
2015	Turkey	Lisa Ashton, Claire Brookin, Deta Hedman & Fallon Sherrock	Winners 9-5 v Germany	Ashton & Brookin - Winners	Hedman & Sherrock - runners up	Lisa Ashton - Winner	Claire Brookin - Last 64	Deta Hedman - Runner Up	Fallon Sherrock - Last 32	Winners
2017	Japan	Did Not Attend	N/A	N/A	N/A	N/A	N/A	N/A	N/A	N/A
2019	Romania	Deta Hedman, Maria O'Brien, Fallon Sherrock & Lorraine Winstanley	Winners 9-4 v Australia	Hedman & O'Brien - Last 8	Sherrock & Winstanley - semi-finals	Deta Hedman - Runner Up	Maria O'Brien - Last 16	Fallon Sherrock - Last 256	Lorraine Winstanley - Last 16	Winners
2023 Denmark	Deta Hedman, Claire Brookin, Beau Greaves & Lorraine Winstanley	S/Finalist 5 - 9 v Wales	Hedman & Greaves - Winners	Brookin & Winstanley Last 128	Beau Greaves Winner	Deta Hedman R/Up	Claire Brookin Last 256	Lorraine Winstanley Last 256	Winners	

Youth team
Year	Host	England team	Girls' singles A	Girls' singles B	Boys' singles A	Boys' singles B	Mixed pairs A	Mixed pairs B	Girls' pairs	Boys' pairs	Overall
2007	Netherlands	Harriet Wolton & Ricky Evans	Harriet Wolton - Runner Up	N/A	Ricky Evans - semi-finals	N/A	Wolton & Evans - semi-finals	N/A	N/A	N/A	Runners Up
2009	United States	Zoe Jones & Shaun Griffiths	Zoe Jones - Runner Up	N/A	Shaun Griffiths - Last 8	N/A	Jones & Griffiths - semi-finals	N/A	N/A	N/A	4th
2011	Ireland	Fallon Sherrock & Jake Jones	Fallon Sherrock - Winner	N/A	Jake Jones - semi-finals	N/A	Sherrock & Jones - Winners	N/A	N/A	N/A	Winners
2013	Canada	Casey Gallagher & Bradley Halls	Casey Gallagher - Winner	N/A	Bradley Halls	N/A	Gallagher & Halls - semi-finals	N/A	N/A	N/A	Runners Up
2015	Turkey	Danielle Ashton, Chelsea Williamson, Chris Gower & Dan Perry	Danielle Ashton - Last 16	Chelsea Williamson - Group 3rd	Chris Gower - semi-finals	Dan Perry - Last 16	Ashton & Gower - Runner Up	Williamson & Perry - Group 3rd	Ashton & Williamson - Last 8	Gower & Perry - Last 8	3rd
2017	Japan	Did Not Attend	N/A	N/A	N/A	N/A	N/A	N/A	N/A	N/A	N/A
2019	Romania	Beau Greaves, Shan Reeves, Keelan Kay & Brad Phillips	Beau Greaves - Winner	Shan Reeves - Last 16	Keelan Kay - Winner	Brad Phillips - Last 16	Greaves & Phillips - Last 8	Reeves & Kay - Last 16	Greaves & Reeves - Winners	Kay & Phillips - Winners	Winners
2023	Denmark	Paige Pauling, Hannah Meek, Jenson Walker & Thomas Banks	Paige Pauling Winner	Hannah Meek Semi-Finalist	Jenson Walker Winner	Thomas Banks Semi-Finalist	Pauling & Banks Winners	Walker & Meek - runners up	Pauling & Meek Winners	Walker & Banks - Winners	Winners

== Europe Cup performance ==
The Europe Cup is held bi-annually for senior teams, while the youth event is held annually and is separate from the senior event.

Men's team
Year	Host	Team	Team event	Pairs A	Pairs B	Singles A	Singles B	Singles C	Singles D	Overall
2008	Denmark	Martin Adams, Darryl Fitton, Tony O'Shea & John Walton	Last 8 8-9 v Scotland	Adams & Walton - Winners	Fitton & O'Shea - Last 32	Martin Adams - semi-finals	Darryl Fitton - Last 64	Tony O'Shea - Last 32	John Walton - Last 32	Unknown
2010	Turkey	Martin Adams, Darryl Fitton, Tony O'Shea & Scott Waites	Last 8 6-9 v Belgium	Adams & Waites - Winners	Fitton & O'Shea - runners up	Martin Adams - Last 8	Darryl Fitton - Last 128	Tony O'Shea - Last 32	Scott Waites - Last 8	Winners
2012	Turkey	Martin Adams, Martin C Atkins, Tony O'Shea & Scott Waites	Runners Up 7-9 v Netherlands	Adams & Atkins - Last 8	O'Shea & Waites - Last 32	Martin Adams - Last 64	Martin C Atkins - Last 8	Tony O'Shea - Last 64	Scott Waites - Last 64	3rd
2014	Romania	Glen Durrant, Scott Mitchell, Scott Waites & James Wilson	Runners Up 7-9 v Wales	Durrant & Wilson - runners up	Mitchell & Waites - Winners	Glen Durrant - Last 8	Scott Mitchell - Last 32	Scott Waites - Last 128	James Wilson - Last 32	Winners
2016	Netherlands	Glen Durrant, Jamie Hughes, James Hurrell & Scott Mitchell	Winners 9-6 v Netherlands	Durrant & Hughes - Last 16	Hurrell & Mitchell - Last 8	Glen Durrant - Last 128	Jamie Hughes - Last 128	James Hurrell - Last 32	Scott Mitchell - Last 128	Runners Up
2018	Hungary	Daniel Day, Nigel Heydon, Paul Hogan & Scott Mitchell	Last 8 8-9 v Netherlands	Day & Mitchell - Winners	Heydon & Hogan - Last 16	Daniel Day - Last 16	Nigel Heydon - Last 8	Paul Hogan - Last 8	Scott Mitchell - Last 32	Winners
2022	Spain	James Hurrell, Luke Littler, Josh Richardson, Scott Williams,	Winners 10-9 v Netherlands	Williams & Richardson - Winners	Littler & Hurrell - Last 8	Luke Littler - Last 8	James Hurrell - Last 16	Scott Williams - Last 16	Josh Richardson - Last 256	Winners

Ladies' team
Year	Host	Team	Team event	Pairs A	Pairs B	Singles A	Singles B	Singles C	Singles D	Overall
2008	Denmark	Lisa Ashton & Trina Gulliver	N/A	Ashton & Gulliver - Quarter Finals	N/A	Lisa Ashton - Runner Up	Trina Gulliver - Last 32	N/A	N/A	Unknown
2010	Turkey	Lisa Ashton & Trina Gulliver	N/A	Ashton & Gulliver - semi-finals	N/A	Lisa Ashton - semi-finals	Trina Gulliver - semi-finals	N/A	N/A	3rd
2012	Turkey	Trina Gulliver & Deta Hedman	N/A	Gulliver & Hedman - semi-finals	N/A	Trina Gulliver - Runner Up	Deta Hedman - Last 16	N/A	N/A	Runners Up
2014	Romania	Lisa Ashton, Trina Gulliver, Deta Hedman & Lorraine Winstanley	Winners 9-3 v Netherlands	Ashton & Gulliver - semi-finals	Hedman & Winstanley - semi-finals	Lisa Ashton - Last 64	Trina Gulliver - Last 32	Deta Hedman - Runner Up	Lorraine Winstanley - semi-finals	Winners
2016	Netherlands	Trina Gulliver, Deta Hedman, Fallon Sherrock & Lorraine Winstanley	Winners 9-3 v Netherlands	Gulliver & Sherrock - Last 32	Hedman & Winstanley - Runner Up	Trina Gulliver - semi-finals	Deta Hedman - Last 64	Fallon Sherrock - Runner Up	Lorraine Winstanley - semi-finals	Winners
2018	Hungary	Deta Hedman, Maria O'Brien, Fallon Sherrock & Lorraine Winstanley	Winners 9-1 v Netherlands	Hedman & O'Brien - Winners	Sherrock & Winstanley - runners up	Deta Hedman - Last 32	Maria O'Brien - Last 8	Fallon Sherrock - Last 8	Lorraine Winstanley - Last 8	Winners
2022	Spain	Deta Hedman, Claire Brookin, Beau Greaves & Lorraine Winstanley	Winners 9-1 v Netherlands	Hedman & Greaves - Winners	Brookin & Winstanley - Last 16	Beau Greaves - Winner	Lorraine Winstanley - Last 8	Deta Hedman - Last 16	Claire Brookin - Last 16	Winners

Boys Team
Year	Host	Team	Team Event	Pairs A	Pairs B	Singles A	Singles B	Singles C	Singles D	Overall
2007	England	Ricky Evans, James Jennings, Arron Monk & David Pallett		Evans & Pallett - runners up	Jennings & Monk	Ricky Evans	James Jennings	Arron Monk -	David Pallett -	Runners Up
2008	Wales	Ricky Evans, Shaun Griffiths, James Hubbard & James Jennings	Runners Up		Shaun Griffiths - Winner					Runners Up
2009	Netherlands									
2010	Germany	Matthew Dicken, Jake Jones, Josh Payne & Ben Songhurst	Example	Example	Example	Example	Example	Example	Example	Winners
2011	Scotland	Thomas Chant, Jake Jones, Josh McCarthy & Josh Payne	Winners 9-6 v Netherlands	Chant & McCarthy - Last 32	Jones & Payne - semi-finals	Thomas Chant - Last 8	Jake Jones - Runner Up	Josh McCarthy - Last 64	Josh Payne - Last 32	Runners Up
2012	Belgium	Zak Cross, Arron Fairweather, Bradley Halls & Josh McCarthy	Runners Up 8-9 v Netherlands	Cross & McCarthy - Last 16	Fairweather & Halls - runners up	Zak Cross - Last 32	Arron Fairweather - Last 64	Bradley Halls - Last 8	Josh McCarthy - Last 16	Runners Up
2013	Hungary	Bradley Halls, George Killington, Mason Riou & Jordan Singh	Last 8 8-9 v Denmark	Halls & Killington - Last 32	Riou & Singh - Last 16	Bradley Halls - Last 16	George Killington - Last 16	Mason Riou - Last 32	Jordan Singh - Last 64	9th
2014	Austria	Connor Levett, Josh McCarthy, Jordan Singh & Nathan Street	Groups - 3rd	Levett & Singh - Last 16	McCarthy & Street - Last 16	Connor Levett - Last 8	Josh McCarthy - Last 32	Jordan Singh - Last 64	Nathan Street - Last 16	10th
2015	Denmark	Chris Gower, Connor Levett, Dan Perry & Jack Vincent	Semi finals 3-9 v Rep of Ireland	Gower & Levett - Last 8	Perry & Vincent - semi-finals	Chris Gower - Last 16	Connor Levett - Last 16	Dan Perry - Last 64	Jack Vincent - Last 32	4th
2016	Hungary	Jimmy Bristow, Owen Maiden, Dan Perry & Tyler Radlett	Last 8 1-9 v Wales	Bristow & Radlett - Last 16	Maiden & Perry - Last 8	Jimmy Bristow - Last 32	Owen Maiden - Last 16	Dan Perry - Last 16	Tyler Radlett - Last 16	5th
2017	Sweden	Jarred Cole, Keelan Kay, Owen Maiden & Jack Vincent	Runners Up 5-9 v Netherlands	Cole & Kay - semi-finals	Maiden & Vincent - Last 8	Jarred Cole - Winner	Keelan Kay - Last 8	Owen Maiden - Group 3rd	Jack Vincent - semi-finals	Runners Up
2018	Turkey	Alex Gurr, Keelan Kay, Brad Phillips & Jack Vincent	Runners Up 5-9 v Netherlands	Gurr & Phillips - Last 8	Kay & Vincent - Last 16	Alex Gurr - Last 32	Keelan Kay - Last 32	Brad Phillips - Last 16	Jack Vincent - semi-finals	3rd
2019	Turkey	Leighton Bennett, Keelan Kay, Mitchell McCarthy & Brad Phillips	Semi finals 4-9 v Rep of Ireland	Bennett & McCarthy - Last 8	Kay & Phillips - semi-finals	Leighton Bennett - Winner	Keelan Kay - Last 8	Mitchell McCarthy - Group 3rd	Brad Phillips - Last 32	Runners Up
2022	Hungary	Luke Littler, Archie Self, Thomas Banks & Charlie Manby	Final 9-0 v Rep of Ireland	Banks & Manby - Winners	Littler & Self - Semi-Finals	Luke Littler - Winner	Archie Self - Runner-Up	Thomas Banks - Quarter-Final	Charlie Manby - Last 32	Winners
2023	Austria	Jenson Walker, Archie Self, Thomas Banks & Callum Beddow	Final 9-3 v Hungary	Banks & Self - Winners	Jenson & Beddow - semi-finals	Thomas Banks - Runner-Up	Jenson Walker Last 16	Archie Self - Group	Callum Beddow - Group	Winners
2024	Latvia	Jenson Walker, Alfie Busby, Ben Gamble & Sam Jackson	Last 16 Scotland v England 9-7	Walker & Busby - Winners	Gamble & Jackson - Group	Jenson Walker - Winner	Alfie Busby Last 16	Ben Gamble - Group	Sam Jackson - Group	Last 16

Girls' team
Year	Host	Team	Pairs	Singles A	Singles B	Overall
2007	England	Tyrian Jesse & Harriet Wolton	Jesse & Wolton	Tyrian Jesse	Harriet Wolton - Runner Up	Runners Up
2008	Wales					
2009	Netherlands	Lauren Hitchins & Zoe Jones	Hitchens & Jones - Winners	Lauren Hitchens	Zoe Jones - Winner	Winners
2010	Germany					
2011	Scotland	Felicia Blay & Fallon Sherrock	Blay & Sherrock - Winners	Felicia Blay - last 16	Fallon Sherrock - last 8	Winners
2012	Belgium	Casey Gallagher & Josie Patterson	Gallagher & Patterson - Winners	Casey Gallagher - Winner	Josie Patterson - last 16	Winners
2013	Hungary	Natasha Eaves & Casey Gallagher	Eaves & Gallagher - Winners	Natasha Eaves - semi-finals	Casey Gallagher - Winner	Winners
2014	Austria	Danielle Ashton & Casey Gallagher	Ashton & Gallagher - Group 6th	Danielle Ashton - Group 6th	Casey Gallgher - last 8	8th
2015	Denmark	Danielle Ashton & Chelsea Williamson	Ashton & Williamson - last 8	Danielle Ashton - last 8	Chelsea Williamson - last 16	6th
2016	Hungary	Danielle Ashton & Beau Greaves	Ashton & Greaves - runners up	Danielle Ashton - last 8	Beau Greaves - Winner	Winners
2017	Sweden	Beau Greaves & Shan Reeves	Greaves & Reeves - last 8	Beau Greaves - last 8	Shan Reeves - last 8	5th
2018	Turkey	Beau Greaves & Shan Reeves	Greaves & Reeves - Winners	Beau Greaves - Winner	Shan Reeves - last 8	Winners
2019	Turkey	Beau Greaves & Shan Reeves	Greaves & Reeves - Winners	Beau Greaves - semi-finals	Shan Reeves - Groups 4th	Winners
2022	Hungary	Amy Evans & Paige Pauling	Evans & Pauling - semi-finals	Amy Evans - Runner-Up	Paige Pauling - semi-finals	Winners
2023	Austria	Hannah Meek & Paige Pauling	Meek & Pauling - runners up	Hannah Meek - Quarte-Finalist	Paige Pauling - last 16	3rd place
2024	Latvia	Paige Pauling & Hannah Meek	Meek & Pauling - semi-finals	Paige Pauling - semi-finals	Hannah Meek - last 16	3rd place

== International honours since 2007 formation ==
England ladies'/girls' honours list
Player	Teams	Years	British international titles	Six Nations titles	World/Europe Cup gold medals	World/Europe silver medals	World/Europe bronze medals	Total
Deta Hedman	BI/SN/EC/WC (L)	Example	7	5	16	6	3	37
Trina Gulliver	BI/SN/EC/WC (L)	Example	8	3	Example	Example	Example	28
Fallon Sherrock	BI/SN/EC/WC (G & L)	2011-2019	4	3 + 2	13	4	1	27
Lorraine Winstanley	BI/SN/EC/WC (L)	Example	7	5	Example	Example	Example	26
Lisa Ashton	BI/SN/EC/WC (L)	Example	7	4	Example	Example	Example	24
Beau Greaves	BI/EC/WC (G)	2016-2019	3	0	Example	Example	Example	15
Casey Gallagher	BI (G & L) EC/WC (G)	2012-2019	3	0	Example	Example	Example	12
Maria O'Brien	BI/SN/EC/WC (L)	Example	2	1	Example	Example	Example	8
Shan Reeves	BI/EC/WC (G)	Example	2	0	Example	Example	Example	8
Zoe Jones	Example	Example	Example	Example	Example	Example	Example	7
Danielle Ashton	Example	Example	Example	Example	Example	Example	Example	6
Claire Brookin	Example	Example	3	0	3	0	0	6
Karen Lawman	Example	Example	Example	Example	Example	Example	Example	5
Harriet Wolton	EC/WC (G)	Example	0	0	0	4	1	5
Clare Bywaters	BI (L)	Example	3	0	0	0	0	3
Natasha Eaves	BI/EC (G)	Example	0	0	2	0	1	3
Josie Patterson	Example	Example	Example	Example	Example	Example	Example	3
Tricia Wright	Example	Example	Example	Example	Example	Example	Example	3
Felicia Blay	EC (G)	2011	0	0	2	0	0	2
Lauren Hitchins	Example	Example	Example	Example	Example	Example	Example	2
Apylee Jones	Example	Example	Example	Example	Example	Example	Example	2
Nadine Bentley	BI (L)	Example	1	0	0	0	0	1
Merryl Dennis	BI (L)	Example	1	0	0	0	0	1
Viv Dundon	BI (L)	Example	1	0	0	0	0	1
Gemma Hayter	BI (L)	Example	1	0	0	0	0	1
Chelsea Williamson	BI/EC/WC (G)		0	0	0	0	1	1
