= Kime (surname) =

Kime is a surname. Notable people with the surname include:

- Geoff Kime (born 1958), English-born Australian darts player
- Haddon Kime (born 1976), American theatre and film composer, lyricist, sound designer, and director
- Hal Kime (1898–1939), American baseball player
- J. William Kime (1934–2006), United States Coast Guard admiral
- Jamie Kime, American guitarist
- Karen Kime, Aboriginal Australian priest and archdeacon
- Otho Kime (1903–1987), American politician from Nebraska
- Robert Kime (1946–2022), British interior decorator

== See also ==
- Kimes
