= 2012 PDPA Players Championship 3 =

Second Round
1	(Scotland) Gary Anderson	6
(Netherlands) Mareno Michels	0
32	(England) Alan Tabern	1
(England) Dennis Smith	6
16	(England) Kevin Painter	3
(England) Jason Crawley	6
(England) Arron Monk	0
(England) Alex Roy	6
8	(England) Dave Chisnall	6
(Republic of Ireland) William O'Connor	5
25	(England) Wayne Jones	6
(England) Andy Jenkins	5
9	(England) Ronnie Baxter	6
(England) Andy Brown	0
(England) Michael Barnard	3
(England) John Bowles	6
5	(Australia) Paul Nicholson	6
(England) Adrian Gray	5
(Wales) Jamie Lewis	6
(England) Darren Whittingham	1
12	(England) Mervyn King	6
(England) Mark Jones	2
21	(England) Jamie Caven	6
(India) Prakash Jiwa	4
4	(England) Wes Newton	6
(England) Brian Woods	1
29	(England) Colin Lloyd	6
(England) Steve West	4
13	(England) Colin Osborne	5
(Republic of Ireland) Connie Finnan	6
20	(England) Steve Beaton	5
(England) Nick Fullwell	6
2	(England) Justin Pipe	2
(England) Michael Smith	6
31	(England) Terry Jenkins	6
(England) Matthew Edgar	3
15	(England) Mark Walsh	6
(Canada) Jeff Smith	2
18	(Wales) Mark Webster	6
(England) Peter Hudson	1
7	(Canada) John Part	2
(Northern Ireland) Brendan Dolan	6
26	(England) Scott Rand	3
(England) Shaun Griffiths	6
10	(Australia) Simon Whitlock	6
(England) Dean Winstanley	1
(England) Kevin McDine	6
(England) Chris Thompson	3
(England) Gary Butcher	6
(England) Nigel Birch	2
27	(Netherlands) Raymond van Barneveld	6
(England) Steve Farmer	3
(Belgium) Kim Huybrechts	6
(Scotland) Les Wallace	5
22	(England) Adrian Lewis	6
(England) Johnny Haines	4
3	(England) Phil Taylor	6
(England) Tony West	1
(Scotland) Robert Thornton	2
(England) Ian White	6
(England) Richie Howson	6
(Netherlands) Roland Scholten	3
19	(England) Andy Smith	6
(England) Darren Johnson	3

Third Round
1	(Scotland) Gary Anderson	6
(England) Dennis Smith	4
(England) Jason Crawley	5
(England) Alex Roy	6
8	(England) Dave Chisnall	6
25	(England) Wayne Jones	3
9	(England) Ronnie Baxter	6
(England) John Bowles	3
5	(Australia) Paul Nicholson	6
(Wales) Jamie Lewis	1
12	(England) Mervyn King	6
21	(England) Jamie Caven	4
4	(England) Wes Newton	6
29	(England) Colin Lloyd	2
(Republic of Ireland) Connie Finnan	6
(England) Nick Fullwell	2
(England) Michael Smith	3
31	(England) Terry Jenkins	6
15	(England) Mark Walsh	5
18	(Wales) Mark Webster	6
(Northern Ireland) Brendan Dolan	6
(England) Shaun Griffiths	5
10	(Australia) Simon Whitlock	6
(England) Kevin McDine	5
(England) Gary Butcher	4
27	(Netherlands) Raymond van Barneveld	6
(Belgium) Kim Huybrechts	6
22	(England) Adrian Lewis	3
3	(England) Phil Taylor	6
(England) Ian White	0
(England) Richie Howson	2
19	(England) Andy Smith	6

Fourth Round
1	(Scotland) Gary Anderson	6
(England) Alex Roy	5
8	(England) Dave Chisnall	6
9	(England) Ronnie Baxter	3
5	(Australia) Paul Nicholson	1
12	(England) Mervyn King	6
4	(England) Wes Newton	6
(Republic of Ireland) Connie Finnan	3
31	(England) Terry Jenkins	6
(Wales) Mark Webster	3
(Northern Ireland) Brendan Dolan	5
10	(Australia) Simon Whitlock	6
27	(Netherlands) Raymond van Barneveld	5
(Belgium) Kim Huybrechts	6
3	(England) Phil Taylor	6
19	(England) Andy Smith	3

Quarter-Finals
1	(Scotland) Gary Anderson	6
8	(England) Dave Chisnall	3
12	(England) Mervyn King	3
4	(England) Wes Newton	6
31	(England) Terry Jenkins	2
10	(Australia) Simon Whitlock	6
(Belgium) Kim Huybrechts	1
3	(England) Phil Taylor	6

Semi-Finals
1	(Scotland) Gary Anderson	4
4	(England) Wes Newton	6
10	(Australia) Simon Whitlock	1
3	(England) Phil Taylor	6

Final
4	(England) Wes Newton	1
3	(England) Phil Taylor	6
