= Kimes =

Kimes is a surname. Notable people with the surname include:

- Beverly Rae Kimes (1939–2008), American automotive journalist
- Ira L. Kimes (1899–1949), U.S. Marine Corps general
- Mina Kimes (born 1985), American journalist
- Royal Wade Kimes (born 1951), American country music singer
- Sante Kimes (1934–2014), American murderer
- Shannon Kimes (born 1977), American politician

== See also ==
- Kime (surname)
- Kimes Buses
