= 2009 WDF World Cup =

The 2009 WDF World Cup was the 17th edition of the WDF World Cup darts tournament, organised by the World Darts Federation. It was held in Charlotte, North Carolina, USA from September 23 to 27.

== Men's singles ==
=== Preliminary round ===
- (Northern Ireland) Gary Elliott 4–1 Christo Meiring (South Africa)
- (Belgium) Kim Huybrechts 4–0 Wynand Havenga (South Africa)
- (Australia) Anthony Fleet 4–2 Les Francis (South Africa)
- (Denmark) Frede Johansen 4–0 Clifford Stradling (South Africa)

=== Knockout stage ===
Second round
(Wales)	Martin Phillips	4
(Belgium)	Kim Huybrechts	0
(Northern Ireland)	Gary Elliot	2
(Republic of Ireland)	Connie Finnan	4
(Spain)	Antonio Hibernon	0
(England)	Darryl Fitton	4
(Germany)	Marko Puls	4
(United States)	Brian Blake	3
(Sweden)	Dennis Nilsson	2
(Australia)	Anthony Fleet	4
(Italy)	Luca Catallo	4
(Cayman Islands)	Rich Campbell	0
(Denmark)	Soren Behrendsen	3
(Russia)	Andrei Ratnikov	4
(Canada)	Clint Clarkson	4
(New Zealand)	Bernie Smith	1
(Australia)	Beau Anderson	3
(Sweden)	Daniel Larsson	4
(Japan)	Atsushi Takeuchi	2
(Canada)	Bernie Miller	4
(Denmark)	Frede Johansen	0
(Scotland)	Mark Barilli	4
(Northern Ireland)	Daryl Gurney	1
(Wales)	David Smith-Hayes	4
(Netherlands)	Joey ten Berge	4
(Malaysia)	Selbaraju Subramaniam	3
(Germany)	Kevin Münch	4
(Cayman Islands)	Eddie Ballantine	0
(Norway)	Jacques Langston	4
(Brazil)	Bruno Rangel	1
(Spain)	Antonio Alcinas	0
(England)	Martin Adams	4
(Netherlands)	Daniel Brouwer	4
(Switzerland)	Roman Bleistein	3
(Australia)	Geoff Kime	4
(Barbados)	Sylvan Jones	0
(Belgium)	Davyd Venken	3
(Turkey)	Eser Tekin	4
(Germany)	Andreas Krockel	2
(United States)	Steve Brown	4
(Canada)	Jerry Hull	1
(Norway)	Oyvind Aasland	4
(Wales)	Wayne Warren	4
(Russia)	Alexei Zhuravlev	0
(Scotland)	John Henderson	2
(England)	Scott Waites	4
(Northern Ireland)	Glen Rodney	2
(Finland)	Jarkko Komula	4
(Republic of Ireland)	Martin McCloskey	4
(Northern Ireland)	John Elder	3
(United States)	Jim Widmayer	1
(Scotland)	Ross Montgomery	4
(Iceland)	Aegir Bjornsson	2
(Denmark)	Stig Jørgensen	4
(Netherlands)	Frans Harmsen	4
(Germany)	Karsten Koch	2
(Australia)	Kyle Anderson	2
(Finland)	Vesa Nuutinen	4
(Turkey)	Bahadir Alev	2
(Japan)	Daisuke Akamatsu	4
(England)	Tony O'Shea	4
(Malaysia)	Clairines Joseph	0
(Russia)	Vladimir Ovchinnikov	1
(Norway)	Robert Wagner	4

Third round
(Wales)	Martin Phillips	2
(Republic of Ireland)	Connie Finnan	4
(England)	Darryl Fitton	2
(Germany)	Marko Puls	4
(Australia)	Anthony Fleet	4
(Italy)	Luca Catallo	3
(Russia)	Andrei Ratnikov	0
(Canada)	Clint Clarkson	4
(Sweden)	Daniel Larsson	3
(Canada)	Bernie Miller	4
(Scotland)	Mark Barilli	2
(Wales)	David Smith-Hayes	4
(Netherlands)	Joey ten Berge	4
(Germany)	Kevin Münch	0
(Norway)	Jacques Langston	0
(England)	Martin Adams	4
(Netherlands)	Daniel Brouwer	1
(Australia)	Geoff Kime	4
(Turkey)	Eser Tekin	4
(United States)	Steve Brown	1
(Norway)	Oyvind Aasland	2
(Wales)	Wayne Warren	4
(England)	Scott Waites	4
(Finland)	Jarkko Komula	3
(Republic of Ireland)	Martin McCloskey	4
(Scotland)	Ross Montgomery	3
(Denmark)	Stig Jørgensen	1
(Netherlands)	Frans Harmsen	4
(Finland)	Vesa Nuutinen	4
(Japan)	Daisuke Akamatsu	0
(England)	Tony O'Shea	4
(Norway)	Robert Wagner	0

Fourth round
(Republic of Ireland)	Connie Finnan	4
(Germany)	Marko Puls	1
(Australia)	Anthony Fleet	4
(Canada)	Clint Clarkson	3
(Canada)	Bernie Miller	3
(Wales)	David Smith-Hayes	4
(Netherlands)	Joey ten Berge	4
(England)	Martin Adams	3
(Australia)	Geoff Kime	3
(Turkey)	Eser Tekin	4
(Wales)	Wayne Warren	3
(England)	Scott Waites	4
(Republic of Ireland)	Martin McCloskey	4
(Netherlands)	Frans Harmsen	0
(Finland)	Vesa Nuutinen	0
(England)	Tony O'Shea	4

Quarter-finals
(Republic of Ireland)	Connie Finnan	5
(Australia)	Anthony Fleet	3
(Wales)	David Smith-Hayes	2
(Netherlands)	Joey ten Berge	5
(Turkey)	Eser Tekin	4
(England)	Scott Waites	5
(Republic of Ireland)	Martin McCloskey	1
(England)	Tony O'Shea	5

Semi-finals
(Republic of Ireland)	Connie Finnan	4
(Netherlands)	Joey ten Berge	6
(England)	Scott Waites	3
(England)	Tony O'Shea	6

Final
(Netherlands)	Joey ten Berge (92.07)	3
(England)	Tony O'Shea (107.13)	7

== Women's singles ==
Quarter-finals
(Wales)	Julie Gore	5
(England)	Lisa Ashton	2
(Republic of Ireland)	Angela De Ward	3
(Russia)	Karina Nagapetyants	5
(New Zealand)	Jannette Jonathan	5
(Sweden)	Carina Ekberg	4
(England)	Karen Lawman	2
(United States)	Stacy Bromberg	5

Semi-finals
(Wales)	Julie Gore	6
(Russia)	Karina Nagapetyants	4
(New Zealand)	Jannette Jonathan	5
(United States)	Stacy Bromberg	6

Final
(Wales)	Julie Gore	3
(United States)	Stacy Bromberg	7

== Other Winners ==
Event	Winner	Score	Runner-up
Men's Team	(Netherlands) Joey ten Berge; Willy van de Wiel; Frans Harmsen; Daniel Brouwer	9-5	(Canada) Ken MacNeil; Clint Clarkson; Bernie Miller; Jerry Hull
Men's Pairs	(Australia) Anthony Fleet; Geoff Kime	6-4	(Northern Ireland) Daryl Gurney; John Elder
Women's Pairs	(England) Lisa Ashton; Karen Lawman	6-4	(Sweden) Maud Jansson; Carina Ekberg
Youth Singles - Boys	(Wales) Jamie Lewis	6-4	(Finland) Tuomas Tikka
Youth Singles - Girls	(Finland) Aliisa Koskivirta	6-5	(England) Zoe Jones
Youth Pairs	(Finland) Tuomas Tikka; Aliisa Koskivirta	6-4	(Republic of Ireland) Paddy Meaney; Aoife Ryan

== Final Points Tables ==
=== Men ===
Ranking	Team	Points
1	Netherlands	100
2	England	84
3	Australia	76
4	Canada	63
5	Northern Ireland	60

=== Women ===
Ranking	Team	Points
1	England	46
2	United States	36
3	Wales	31
3	Sweden	31
5	Russia	25

=== Youth ===
Ranking	Team	Points
1	Finland	82
2	Wales	47
3	Republic of Ireland	42
4	England	39
5	Australia	30
