= Connie Finnan =

Irish professional darts player

Personal information
- Born: 20 May 1962 (age 64) Garryowen, Ireland
- Home town: Limerick, Ireland

Sport
- Sport: Darts
- Playing since: 1993
- Darts: 23 Gram Target
- Laterality: Right-handed
- Walk-on music: "You're Such a Good Looking Woman" by Joe Dolan

Organisation (see split in darts)
- BDO: 2005–2011
- PDC: 2011–2015

WDF major events – best performances
- World Masters: Quarter Final: 2009

PDC premier events – best performances
- World Championship: Last 72: 2012
- World Grand Prix: Last 16: 2013
- UK Open: Last 96: 2013

Other tournament wins
- Years
INDO Irish Masters	2010
INDO Strokestown Singles	2010
Ireland National Championships	2009, 2010
Limerick Classic	2009
Tom Kirby Memorial Trophy	2011

Other achievements
- 9 Dart Finish: PDPA Players Ch'ship Barnsley 2012

Connie Finnan (born 20 May 1962) is an Irish former professional darts player.

== Career ==
=== BDO ===
In September 2009, Finnan qualified for the televised stages of the World Masters. He defeated Darryl Fitton 3–1 in the last 16 before losing 3–0 to Robbie Green in the quarter-finals. Later that month, he reached the semi-finals of the 2009 WDF World Cup men's singles, but was beaten 6–4 by Joey ten Berge.

=== PDC ===
Finnan qualified for the 2012 PDC World Championship after winning the final of the Tom Kirby Memorial Irish Matchplay against Shane O'Connor. He lost 4–3 in the preliminary round to New Zealand's Warren French, having led 3–1.

In January 2012, Finnan won a PDC Pro Tour card for 2012 and 2013 at the PDC's Qualifying School in Barnsley. In November, he threw a nine-dart finish in the fourth round of the 20th Players Championship during a 6–3 win over world number six Wes Newton which earned him £4,800. Finnan was then defeated 1–6 in the quarter-finals to Michael van Gerwen. This was Finnan's best result of 2012, and he went into 2013 ranked world number 78.

Finnan played in his first World Cup of Darts in February 2013 with William O'Connor. The pair beat Denmark 5–0 in their first match and despite losing to South Africa 4–5 they finished top of Group B on leg difference to reach the last 16. They faced Japan and were defeated 3–5. Finnan was beaten 4–5 by Adrian Gray in the second round of the UK Open. Finnan qualified for the World Grand Prix for the first time and pulled off the result of his career in the first round as he defeated Terry Jenkins by two sets to none. He led two-time winner of the event James Wade 1–0 and 2–1 in the next round, but the game went into a deciding set. At 2–1 down in the set Finnan missed a single 10 which would have left him 32 with his last dart and saw Wade step in to finish 91 to win. If Finnan had won the leg he would have been throwing for the match in the next. In the same week he advanced to the final of the Irish Matchplay final, Ireland's biggest domestic darts tournament, and lost 6–4 to Colin McGarry. A win would have seen him clinch a place for the 2014 World Championship.

Finnan's status on the tour he earned two years ago expired after the 2014 World Championship, but he was ranked world number 60 after the tournament inside the top 64 who retain their places. In May he secured wins over top ten players Dave Chisnall and Simon Whitlock at the ninth Players Championship to reach the quarter-finals of a PDC event for the second time in his career, where he lost 6–3 to Justin Pipe. Finnan and O'Connor lost five successive legs in the first round of the World Cup of Darts to be beaten 5–3 by Singapore. Finnan reached the last 32 of three more events during the rest of the season.

He maintained his tour status by starting 2015 ranked world number 63. Finnan and O'Connor's World Cup second round match with Hong Kong went to a doubles match which they lost 4–3. Finnan did not play the full schedule of events in 2015 and lost the £7,000 from the 2013 World Grand Prix on his Order of Merit ranking which meant he needed to enter Q School in January 2016 to remain on tour, which he did not do.

Finnan quit the PDC in 2015.

== Personal life ==
Finnan is married and has two daughters. He is not a full-time darts player and works in a factory making plastic bag closures in Shannon.

== World Championship results ==
=== PDC ===
- 2012: Preliminary round (lost to Warren French 3–4) (legs)
