= Anthony Fleet =

Australian darts player (born 1965)

Personal information
- Nickname: "Fleety"
- Born: 6 September 1965 (age 61) Canberra, Australia

Sport
- Sport: Darts
- Playing since: 1982
- Darts: 20g Target
- Laterality: Right-handed
- Walk-on music: "Down Under" by Men at Work

Organisation (see split in darts)
- BDO: 2000–2005, 2008–2015
- PDC: 2006–2008

WDF major events – best performances
- World Championship: Last 32: 2010
- World Masters: Last 136: 2009

PDC premier events – best performances
- World Championship: Last 64: 2007

Other tournament wins
- Tournament: Years
- Central Coast Australian Classic Oak Flats Soundwaves Open Goulburn Open Pacific Masters Australian Grand Masters: 2003, 2009; 2005; 2008; 2009; 2009, 2010
Medal record
Men's Darts
Representing Australia
WDF Asia-Pacific Cup
| Gold medal – first place | 2010 Tokyo | Men's pairs |
| Bronze medal – third place | 2010 Tokyo | Men's singles |
| Bronze medal – third place | 2002 Bangkok | Team event |
| Bronze medal – third place | 2010 Tokyo | Team event |

Anthony "Tony" Fleet (born 6 September 1965) is an Australian former professional darts player who competed in British Darts Organisation (BDO), World Darts Federation (WDF) and Professional Darts Corporation (PDC) events.

== Career ==
Born in Canberra, Fleet qualified for the 2007 PDC World Darts Championship, but was defeated by Adrian Lewis 3–0 in the first round.

In 2009, Fleet won the Pacific Masters, and the WDF World Cup pairs with Geoff Kime.

Fleet qualified for the 2010 BDO World Championship at the Lakeside Country Club where he was drawn against the 2007 World Champion Martin Adams. In 27 darts, Fleet scored 26, 41, 60, 60, 5, 41 (with his first dart hitting double 1), 22, 80 and 11, and it is largely considered to be "the worst leg in darts history". Adams also struggled to get going in the leg, missing 4 darts at a double before finally finishing on double 3. Fleet achieved a 3-dart average of 65.34 (one of the lowest recorded averages in the history of a major competition), and lost 3–0 in sets without winning a leg. Adams later spoke of his sympathy for Fleet and recalled his nerves the first time he played at the Lakeside saying that "no one knows what its like up there until you get up there."

In February 2011, Fleet won the 2 Mittagong RSL Open events on the DPA Australian Grand Prix Pro Tour. He then won the World Darts Federation's West Coast Classic, held on 20–21 February, defeating Kyle Anderson 5–2 in the final. Fleet won 4 more DPA Australian Grand Prix Pro Tour events during the year.

== World Championship results ==
=== PDC ===
- 2007: First round: (lost to Adrian Lewis 0–3) (sets)

=== BDO ===
- 2010: First round: (lost to Martin Adams 0–3)
