= Geoff Kime =

English–Australian darts player

Personal information
- Full name: Geoffrey Kime
- Nickname: "Big Time"
- Born: 9 January 1958 (age 68) Leeds, England
- Home town: Brisbane, Australia

Sport
- Sport: Darts
- Playing since: 1988
- Darts: 22g Eigen Ontwerp
- Laterality: Right-handed
- Walk-on music: "Back in Black" by AC/DC

Organisation (see split in darts)
- BDO: 2004–2011
- PDC: 2011–2012

PDC premier events – best performances
- World Championship: Last 64: 2012

Other tournament wins
- Tournament: Years
- Oceanic Masters Redcliffe Darts Open WDF World Cup Pairs: 2011; 2011; 2009

Geoffrey "Geoff" Kime (born 9 January 1958) is an English-born Australian former professional darts player who has played in the Professional Darts Corporation (PDC) events.

== Career ==
Kime won the 2009 WDF World Cup men's pairs alongside Anthony Fleet.

Kime won the 2011 Oceanic Masters to qualify for the 2012 PDC World Darts Championship. He played against Mervyn King in the first round, but failed to win a leg and lost 3–0 in sets.

== World Championship performances ==
=== PDC ===
- 2012: 1st Round (lost to Mervyn King 0–3) (sets)
