= Karen Kime =

Aboriginal Australian priest and archdeacon in the Anglican Church of Australia

The Venerable Karen Kime
- Archdeacon for Indigenous Ministries
- Church: Anglican Church of Australia
- Diocese: Canberra & Goulburn
- Appointed: 2012

Orders
- Ordination: 2000 (as priest)

Personal details
- Education: Charles Sturt University

Karen Kime is an Aboriginal Australian priest and archdeacon in the Anglican Church of Australia. She is a Birripi woman.

== Early life ==
Kime grew up in Cabramatta, Sydney. Her extended family come from the Dingo Creek area of Kempsey Shire, New South Wales.

Kime completed a BA in Social Welfare and a MA in Cultural Heritage.

== Career ==
Kime was ordained as a priest in the Anglican Church of Australia in 2000. She was the first Aboriginal woman to become a priest in New South Wales.

In February 2012, Kime was made an archdeacon. She became the first female Aboriginal to hold such a position in the Anglican Church of Australia. She is responsible for indigenous ministry in Canberra and Goulburn and is also the indigenous services manager for Anglicare. Kime has been responsible for bringing the needs of Aboriginal Australians to the attention of the Anglican Church and calling for new appointments and structures to address social inequality. For example, she has stated that all dioceses should join to fund a full-time Aboriginal bishop.

In 2012, she delivered the John Roffey Memorial Lecture at the Anglicare Australia conference.

In 2013, she was a delegate on the United Nations Commission on the Status of Women.

She is an academic fellow at Charles Sturt University and lectures in the university's schools of theology, education and humanities. She developed the first indigenous social welfare and theology subjects for distance education students and the first teacher education program for primary teachers in indigenous teaching and learning. As of 2015, Kime is studying towards a PhD in Aboriginal spirituality.
