= Kime, Missouri =

Extinct hamlet in Missouri, U.S.

Coordinates: 37°03′04″N 90°23′59″W

Kime is an extinct town in Wayne County, in the U.S. state of Missouri. The GNIS classifies it as a populated place.

The community was located approximately 4.5 miles southeast of Greenville about one mile east of the St. Francis River (currently the upper reaches of Lake Wappapello) and adjacent to Missouri Route BB.

A post office called Kime was established in 1904, and remained in operation until 1937. The community has the name of Samuel Kime, an early settler.
