= 2003 UK Open =

2003 Sky Bet UK Open

Tournament information
- Dates: 30 May–1 June 2003
- Venue: Reebok Stadium
- Location: Bolton
- Country: England
- Organisation(s): PDC
- Format: Legs; Final – best of 35
- Prize fund: £124,000
- Winner's share: £30,000
- High checkout: 170 (England) Shayne Burgess (Final) (England) Dave Smith (Quarter-Finals)

Champion(s)
- (England) Phil Taylor

The 2003 Sky Bet UK Open was the first edition of the UK Open darts tournament organised by the Professional Darts Corporation. The tournament was held at the Reebok Stadium in Bolton, England between 30 May–1 June 2003.

Unlike other tournaments, the UK Open had no seeding, and was won by Phil Taylor who defeated Shayne Burgess in the final 18–8 in legs. Players entered at different stages based on their ranking in the UK Open Order of Merit, with the top 32 players entering at the third round and players ranked 33–64 entering at the second round.

== Friday 30 May 2003 ==
=== Preliminary round (best of nine legs) ===
Player	Score	Player
(Scotland) John Henderson	5 – 4	(England) Paul Amos
(Wales) Wayne Palfrey	5 – 4	(Republic of Ireland) Tom Kirby
(England) Paul Hogan	5 – 3	(England) Deta Hedman

=== First round (best of nine legs) ===
Player	Score	Player	Player	Score	Player
(England) Mark Thomson	5 – 4	(Wales) Marshall James	(England) John King	1 – 5	(England) Colin Monk
(England) Les Fitton	5 – 1	(England) James Greenfield	(England) Dave Smith	5 – 1	(England) Dean Taylor
(England) Bob Crawley	5 – 4	(England) Gary Stevens	(England) Andy Belton	4 – 5	(England) Shayne Burgess
(England) Terry Jenkins	5 – 3	(Republic of Ireland) Keith Rooney	(England) John Ferrell	4 – 5	(England) Peter Allen
(England) John Nesbitt	5 – 4	(Northern Ireland) Brendan Dolan	(England) Dave Jowett	5 – 1	(England) Chris Gough
(Australia) David Platt	5 – 2	(Wales) Martyn Freeman	(England) Bill Burksfield	W/O	(Scotland) John Henderson
(Wales) Dave Roberts	1 – 5	(England) Rod Harrington	(England) Wayne Merrick	5 – 3	(England) Keith Wright
(England) David Peploe	2 – 5	(Wales) Wayne Davies	(England) Crissy Manley	2 – 5	(Wales) Wayne Palfrey
(England) Chris McTernan	4 – 5	(England) Paul Whitworth	(Republic of Ireland) Jim Regan	2 – 5	(England) Matt Chapman
(England) Tony Wood	0 – 5	(England) Mick Carrick	(England) Paul Butler	3 – 5	(England) Paul Hogan
(England) Simon Laws	2 – 5	(England) Chris Kenny	(England) Nigel Justice	1 – 5	(England) Norman Fletcher
(England) Michael Kendrick	3 – 5	(Wales) Wayne Atwood	(Wales) Robert Heard	W/O	(England) Adam King
(England) Dean Williams	5 – 2	(England) Leon Womack	(Wales) Steve Evans	W/O	(Northern Ireland) Nigel Peden
(England) Steve Parsons	2 – 5	(England) Dave Weston	(England) Andrew Gillam	2 – 5	(England) Mick Booth
(England) Dick Brittain	1 – 5	(Wales) Glynn Carus	(England) Darren Webster	5 – 2	(England) Keith Read
(England) Andy Smith	5 – 0	(England) Martin Dunford	(England) Darren Moulsley	2 – 5	(Wales) Ian Burnett

=== Second round (best of nine legs) ===
Player	Score	Player		Player	Score	Player
(England) Mark Walsh	5 – 2	(England) Eddie Lovely		(England) Reg Harding	2 – 5	Steve Beaton
(England) Darren Webster	3 – 5	(England) John Lowe		(England) Paul Carter	4 – 5	Cliff Lazarenko
(Wales) Sean Palfrey	4 – 5	(England) Keith Deller		(Wales) Glynn Carus	0 – 5	(England) Wesley Newton
(England) Mark Holden	4 – 5	(Wales) Wayne Davies		(Wales) Ken Thomas	5 – 3	(Wales) Wayne Atwood
(England) Ian Cullingworth	3 – 5	(England) Ian Covill		(England) Chris Kenny	5 – 0	(Northern Ireland) Roy Montgomery
(England) Mick Booth	1 – 5	(Wales) Andrew Davies		(England) Dave Weston	1 – 5	(England) Mark Thomson
(England) Vic Hubbard	0 – 5	(England) Steve Maish		(England) Nigel Peden	5 – 3	John Nesbitt
(England) Barrie Bates	5 – 0	(England) Paul Whitworth		(England) Bob Crawley	1 – 5	(England) Les Fitton
(England) Mark Robinson	5 – 1	Alan Green		(England) Andy Smith	1 – 5	(England) Colin Monk
(England) Wayne Merrick	3 – 5	Matt Chapman		(England) Norman Fletcher	1 – 5	(England) Adrian Gray
(Northern Ireland) Henry O'Neill	5 – 4	(United States) Steve Brown		(England) Dean Williams	3 – 5	Dave Smith
(England) Terry Jenkins	5 – 1	(England) Paul Hogan		(Australia) David Platt	5 – 2	(England) Rod Harrington
(England) Mick Manning	4 – 5	Robbie Widdows		(England) Willie Burksfield	5 – 1	(England) Graeme Stoddart
(England) Dave Jowett	5 – 1	Ian Burnett		(England) Lionel Sams	5 – 2	Mick Carrick
(England) Mick Savvery	5 – 3	(Malta) Andy Keen	5 _ 2	(England) Shayne Burgess	5 – 0	(Wales) Robert Heard
(England) Keith Wetton	2 – 5	(England) Andy Hayfield		(Wales) Wayne Palfrey	3 – 5	(England) Peter Allen

== Saturday 31 May ==
=== Third round (best of nine legs) ===
Player	Score	Player	Player	Score	Player
(England) Mark Dudbridge	2 – 5	(England) Cliff Lazarenko	(Northern Ireland) John MaGowan	3 – 5	(England) Wayne Jones
(Jamaica) Al Hedman	4 – 5	(England) Shayne Burgess	(England) Robbie Widdows	2 – 5	(Wales) Alan Reynolds
(England) Peter Manley	5 – 1	(Wales) Ken Thomas	(England) Dave Smith	W/O	(England) Chris Kenny
(England) Dennis Priestley	5 – 2	(England) Ian Covill	(England) Peter Allen	3 – 5	(England) Tom Wilson
(England) Alex Roy	5 – 2	(England) Peter Evison	(England) Dave Askew	3 – 5	(England) Dennis Smith
(Wales) Wayne Davies	1 – 5	(Northern Ireland) Paul Dillon	(Northern Ireland) Henry O'Neill	5 – 2	(Wales) Andrew Davies
(England) Simon Whatley	5 – 3	(Wales) Barrie Bates	(England) John Lowe	4 – 5	(England) Mark Walsh
(England) Andy Jenkins	5 – 3	(England) Keith Deller	(England) Colin Monk	5 – 1	(England) Matt Chapman
(England) Mark Robinson	3 – 5	(England) Mark Thomson	(Canada) John Part	5 – 2	(England) Lee Palfreyman
(England) Terry Jenkins	3 – 5	(England) Denis Ovens	(England) Dave Jowett	2 – 5	(England) Colin Lloyd
(England) Paul Williams	5 – 4	(Scotland) Jamie Harvey	(Northern Ireland) Nigel Peden	1 – 5	(England) Les Hodkinson
(England) Steve Johnson	3 – 5	(England) Adrian Gray	(England) Steve Beaton	5 – 0	(England) Steve Maish
(England) Kevin Painter	3 – 5	(England) Phil Taylor	(Wales) Richie Burnett	5 – 1	(England) Alan Caves
(England) Bill Burksfield	5 – 2	(England) Mick Savvery	(England) James Wade	5 – 4	(England) Ronnie Baxter
(England) Alan Warriner-Little	3 – 5	(England) Wayne Mardle	(Netherlands) Roland Scholten	5 – 0	(England) Lionel Sams
(Australia) David Platt	3 – 5	(England) Les Fitton	(England) Andy Hayfield	W/O	(England) Wesley Newton

=== Fourth round (best of fifteen legs) ===
Player	Score	Player	Player	Score	Player
(Wales) Richie Burnett	2 – 8	(England) Steve Beaton	(Netherlands) Roland Scholten	8 – 6	(England) Wayne Mardle
(England) Phil Taylor	8 – 3	(England) Dennis Smith	(Canada) John Part	8 – 6	(England) Peter Manley
(England) Alex Roy	8 – 4	(England) James Wade	(England) Colin Monk	8 – 2	(Wales) Alan Reynolds
(England) Shayne Burgess	8 – 6	(England) Simon Whatley	(England) Denis Ovens	3 – 8	(England) Dennis Priestley
(England) Adrian Gray	8 – 7	(England) Colin Lloyd	(England) Andy Jenkins	3 – 8	(England) Tom Wilson
(England) Cliff Lazarenko	8 – 6	(England) Les Hodkinson	(Northern Ireland) Henry O'Neill	1 – 8	(England) Wayne Jones
(England) Paul Williams	8 – 5	(England) Les Fitton	(England) Wesley Newton	6 – 8	(England) Mark Thomson
(England) Mark Walsh	6 – 8	(Northern Ireland) Paul Dillon	(England) Dave Smith	8 – 4	(England) Willie Burksfield

=== Fifth round (best of 17 legs) ===
Player	Score	Player	Player	Score	Player
(England) Paul Williams	9 – 8	(England) Alex Roy	(Netherlands) Roland Scholten	9 – 7	(England) Steve Beaton
(England) Phil Taylor	9 – 1	(Northern Ireland) Paul Dillon	(England) Colin Monk	9 – 8	(Canada) John Part
(England) Tom Wilson	9 – 4	(England) Mark Thomson	(England) Dave Smith	9 – 6	(England) Adrian Gray
(England) Shayne Burgess	9 – 7	(England) Cliff Lazarenko	(England) Wayne Jones	9 – 5	(England) Dennis Priestley

== Sunday 1 June ==
=== Quarter-finals, semi-finals and final ===
Quarter-finals (best of 19 legs)
Phil Taylor 93.55	10
(England) Tom Wilson 80.89	2
(Netherlands) Roland Scholten 85.60	10
(England) Dave Smith 81.90	7
Colin Monk 83.65	5
Shayne Burgess 80.61	10
Paul Williams 81.27	10
Wayne Jones 82.59	8

Semi-finals (best of 19 legs)
Phil Taylor 95.71	11
(Netherlands) Roland Scholten 88.21	5
Shayne Burgess 85.78	11
Paul Williams 89.91	9

Final (best of 35 legs)
Phil Taylor 98.03	18
Shayne Burgess 91.36	8
