= 2009 UK Open =

2009 Blue Square UK Open

Tournament information
- Dates: 4–7 June 2009
- Venue: Reebok Stadium
- Location: Bolton
- Country: England
- Organisation(s): PDC
- Format: Legs; Final – best of 21
- Prize fund: £200,000
- Winner's share: £40,000

Champion(s)
- (England) Phil Taylor

The 2009 Blue Square UK Open was the seventh year of the PDC darts tournament where, following numerous regional qualifying heats throughout Britain, players competed in a single elimination tournament to be crowned champion. The tournament was held at the Reebok Stadium in Bolton, England, between 4–7 June 2009 and has the nickname, "the FA Cup of darts" as a random draw is staged after each round until the final.

Phil Taylor won the title for the third time by defeating Colin Osborne 11–6 in the final.

== 2009 UK Open Regional Finals ==
There were eight regional final events staged between January and May 2009 to determine the UK Open Order of Merit Table. The tournament winners were:

11 January (North-East; Doncaster): Colin Lloyd 6–1 Colin Osborne
8 March (Scotland; Irvine): Robert Thornton 6–2 Dennis Priestley
15 March (North-West; Wigan): James Wade 6–3 Kevin McDine
22 March (South-East; Brentwood): Phil Taylor 6–4 Terry Jenkins
29 March (West Midlands; Coventry): Phil Taylor 6–5 Wayne Jones
12 April (South-West; Taunton): Phil Taylor 6–0 Andy Hamilton
19 April (East Midlands; Derby): Mark Walsh 6–5 Raymond van Barneveld
10 May (Wales; Newport): Jamie Caven 6–5 Alan Tabern

== Format and qualifiers ==
The tournament features 129 players. As in previous years, eight regional UK Open events were staged across the UK where players winning are collated into the UK Open Order Of Merit. The top 96 players and ties in the list, who played a minimum of three events received a place at the final stages.

1. (England) Phil Taylor
2. (England) Mark Walsh
3. (England) Colin Lloyd
4. (England) Jamie Caven
5. (Scotland) Robert Thornton
6. (England) James Wade
7. (England) Dennis Priestley
8. (England) Colin Osborne
9. (England) Wayne Jones
10. (England) Terry Jenkins
11. (England) Andy Hamilton
12. (England) Mark Dudbridge
13. (England) Alan Tabern
14. (Netherlands) Co Stompé
15. (England) Kevin McDine
16. (Netherlands) Raymond van Barneveld
17. (Netherlands) Vincent van der Voort
18. (Netherlands) Jelle Klaasen
19. (England) Kevin Painter
20. (England) Andy Jenkins
21. (England) Peter Manley
22. (Netherlands) Michael van Gerwen
23. (England) Adrian Lewis
24. (England) Steve Hine
25. (England) Mervyn King
26. (England) Lionel Sams
27. (England) Ronnie Baxter
28. (England) Mark Frost
29. (Northern Ireland) Brendan Dolan
30. (Wales) Barrie Bates
31. (Wales) Mark Webster
32. (England) Darren Johnson

The Holsten qualifiers and the players outside the top 32 of the UK Open Order of Merit began the tournament on the Thursday night. They played down to 32 players, and they were joined by the top 32 of the UK Open Order of Merit the following night, to provide the competition's last 64. A random draw was made after each subsequent round.

33. (England) Steve Maish
34. (Wales) Wayne Atwood
35. (England) Michael Barnard
36. (England) Wayne Mardle
37. (England) Matt Clark
38. (England) Tony Eccles
39. (England) Colin Monk
40. (England) Steve Beaton
41. (England) Ken Dobson
42. (England) Denis Ovens
43. (England) Andy Smith
44. (England) Chris Thompson
45. (England) Steve Brown
46. (England) Dennis Smith
47. (Scotland) Gary Anderson
48. (Canada) John Part
49. (Netherlands) Jan van der Rassel
50. (United States) Larry Butler
51. (England) Kevin Dowling
52. (England) Wes Newton
53. (England) Tony Ayres
54. (England) Adrian Gray
55. (England) Paul Knighton
56. (England) Mark Lawrence
57. (Republic of Ireland) Mick McGowan
58. (England) Nick Fullwell
59. (Australia) Paul Nicholson
60. (England) Martyn Turner
61. (England) Kirk Shepherd
62. (Scotland) Jason Clark
63. (England) Dave Honey
64. (England) Dave Askew
65. (Wales) Steve Evans
66. (Netherlands) Toon Greebe
67. (Northern Ireland) John MaGowan
68. (England) Robbie Parker
69. (England) Alex Roy
70. (England) Gary Welding
71. (England) Joe Cullen
72. (England) Ian Jopling
73. (England) Chris Mason
74. (England) James Barton
75. (United States) John Kuczynski
76. (Netherlands) Roland Scholten
77. (England) Dave Smith
78. (Scotland) Peter Wright
79. (England) Louis Blundell
80. (United States) David Fatum
81. (England) Steve Grubb
82. (England) Stephen Hardy
83. (United States) Gary Mawson
84. (Sweden) Par Riihonen
85. (England) Lee Williams
86. (England) Stuart Bousfield
87. (Wales) Richie Burnett
88. (Russia) Anastasia Dobromyslova
89. (England) Mark Jodrill
90. (England) Chris Cooper
91. (England) Ian Critchett
92. (England) Dave Ladley
93. (England) Darren Latham
94. (Scotland) Chris Loudon
95. (Gibraltar) Dyson Parody
96. (England) Justin Pipe
97. (England) Alan Caves
98. (England) Michael Smith

32 players were due to have qualified from four Holsten Pils qualifiers held in Aylesbury, Batley, Birmingham and Salford. However, Peter Green had to withdraw for unknown reasons, thus meaning there were only 31 qualifiers present in Bolton.

Aylesbury

- (England) Phil Currie
- (England) Steve Dolan
- (England) Adrian Genery
- ~~(Wales) Peter Green~~
- (England) John McGuirk
- (England) Steve Penney
- (Scotland) Stuart Pickles
- (Netherlands) Coen Wiekamp
- (England) Eddie Lovely

Batley

- (England) Alan Davie
- (England) Glen Durrant
- (England) Chris Hornby
- (England) Stuart Monaghan
- (England) David Smurthwaite
- (England) Gary Stevens
- (England) Graham Usher
- (England) Darren Weaver

Birmingham

- (England) Paul Cook
- (England) Mark Cox
- (England) Johnny Haines
- (England) Mike Langley
- (Wales) Mark Layton
- (England) Andy Pearce
- (England) Andy Roberts
- (England) Paul Rowley

Salford

- (England) Kevin Beare
- (England) Andy Boulton
- (England) Matthew Campbell
- (England) Les Fitton
- (England) Duane Garfield
- (England) Ken Mather
- (England) Harry Robinson
- (Wales) Derek Williams

== Prize money ==
Stage (no. of players)		Prize money (Total: £200,000)
Winner	(1)	£40,000
Runner-Up	(1)	£20,000
Semi-finalists	(2)	£10,000
Quarter-finalists	(4)	£6,000
Last 16 (fifth round)	(8)	£4,000
Last 32 (fourth round)	(16)	£2,000
Last 64 (third round)	(32)	£1,000
Last 96 (second round)	(32)	n/a
Last 128 (first round)	(32)	n/a
Last 129 (preliminary round)	(1)	n/a

In addition, Holsten offered a £3,000 bonus to the Pub Qualifier to get the furthest into the tournament (shared by Ken Mather and Andy Roberts).

== Draw ==
The draw for the preliminary, first and second rounds was made on 25 May, ahead of the 2009 Premier League Darts play-offs by Sid Waddell and Keith Deller.

=== Preliminary round ===
This match was the best of eleven legs, and was played on 4 June.

Player #1	Score	Player #2
(England) Gary Stephens	3–6	(England) Ken Mather
(England) Andy Roberts 80.00	6–5	(England) Eddie Lovely

=== First round ===
- All matches were the best of eleven legs, and were played on 4 June.

Player #1	Score	Player #2	Player #1	Score	Player #2
(England) James Barton 90.30	3–6	(Netherlands) Toon Greebe 84.58	(England) Alex Roy 97.01	6–1	(Wales) Richie Burnett 87.94
(England) Harry Robinson	0–6	(England) Chris Cooper	(United States) Gary Mawson 83.26	6–1	(England) Darren Weaver 73.06
(England) Matthew Campbell	1–6	(England) Stuart Bousfield	(Wales) Steve Evans	6–3	(England) Mark Layton
(England) Adrian Genery	5–6	(Scotland) Chris Loudon	(England) Gary Welding	6–2	(United States) John Kuczynski
(England) Duane Garfield	3–6	(England) Dave Smith	(England) Stephen Hardy	6–2	(Netherlands) Coen Wiekamp
(England) Chris Mason	3–6	(England) Steve Penney	(England) David Smurthwaite	2–6	(England) Mark Jodrill
(England) Stuart Monaghan	3–6	(England) Alan Davie	(England) Graham Usher	3–6	(England) Glen Durrant
(Netherlands) Roland Scholten	6–1	(Wales) Derek Williams	(England) Phil Currie	2–6	(England) Steve Dolan
(Russia) Anastasia Dobromyslova	2–6	(England) Andy Roberts	(England) Michael Smith	5–6	(England) Dave Ladley
(England) Peter Wright	6–4	(England) Chris Hornby	(England) Andy Pearce	5–6	(England) Johnny Haines
(England) Ian Critchett	6–5	(England) Kevin Beare	(England) Ken Mather	6–4	(England) Robbie Parker
(England) Paul Cook	6–2	(England) Mike Langley	(Sweden) Par Riihonen	5–6	(England) Steve Grubb
(England) John McGuirk	6–2	(Scotland) Stuart Pickles	(United States) David Fatum	5–6	(England) Paul Rowley
(England) Lee Williams	6–1	(England) Alan Caves	(England) Darren Latham	5–6	(England) Andy Boulton
(Gibraltar) Dyson Parody	1–6	(Northern Ireland) John MaGowan	(England) Joe Cullen	1–6	(England) Justin Pipe
(England) Les Fitton	6–5	(England) Mark Cox	(England) Louis Blundell	6–4	(England) Ian Jopling

=== Second round ===
- All matches were the best of eleven legs, and were played on 4 June.

Player #1	Score	Player #2	Player #1	Score	Player #2
(England) Glen Durrant	6–2	(England) John McGuirk	(England) Mark Jodrill	2–6	(England) Chris Thompson
(England) Martyn Turner	4–6	(England) Dave Honey	(Australia) Paul Nicholson 95.45	6–4	(Scotland) Gary Anderson 88.76
(England) Gary Welding	6–0	(Northern Ireland) John MaGowan	(England) Louis Blundell	6–0	(England) Kevin Dowling
(England) Adrian Gray	5–6	(England) Dave Askew	(England) Tony Ayres	3–6	(England) Justin Pipe
(Wales) Steve Evans	5–6	(England) Steve Dolan	(England) Ken Dobson	6–5	(England) Paul Knighton
(England) Dennis Smith	1–6	(England) Ken Mather	(England) Lee Williams	6–4	(Wales) Wayne Atwood
(Netherlands) Roland Scholten	6–1	(England) Ian Critchett	(Scotland) Jason Clark	6–4	(England) Stuart Bousfield
(England) Kirk Shepherd	3–6	(England) Steve Brown	(Scotland) Chris Loudon	5–6	(England) Chris Cooper
(England) Steve Penney	5–6	(England) Steve Grubb	(United States) Gary Mawson	4–6	(England) Johnny Haines
(England) Paul Cook	†	(England) Mark Lawrence	(England) Nick Fullwell	1–6	(England) Andy Smith
(England) Colin Monk	6–5	(United States) Larry Butler	(Republic of Ireland) Mick McGowan 84.38	3–6	(Canada) John Part 88.23
(England) Dave Smith	2–6	(England) Denis Ovens	(England) Paul Rowley	6–3	(England) Dave Ladley
(England) Wes Newton	6–4	(England) Andy Boulton	(England) Alan Davie	2–6	(Scotland) Peter Wright
(England) Stephen Hardy	3–6	(Netherlands) Jan van der Rassel	(England) Michael Barnard	6–0	(England) Steve Maish
(England) Wayne Mardle 84.84	6–4	(England) Les Fitton 85.21	(England) Matt Clark	3–6	(England) Alex Roy
(England) Tony Eccles	6–3	(Netherlands) Toon Greebe	(England) Andy Roberts	6–2	(England) Steve Beaton

† Mark Lawrence was given a bye into round three, as Paul Cook was disqualified.

=== Third round ===
- All matches were the best of seventeen legs, and were played on 5 June.

Player #1	Score	Player #2	Player #1	Score	Player #2
(England) Ronnie Baxter	9–7	(England) Tony Eccles	(England) Lee Williams 84.02	1–9	(England) Phil Taylor 103.68
(England) Gary Welding	9–5	(England) Steve Hine	(England) Mark Dudbridge	9–7	(England) Johnny Haines
(England) Colin Osborne	9–2	(Scotland) Jason Clark	(England) Steve Dolan	1–9	(England) Jamie Caven
(Netherlands) Vincent van der Voort	6–9	(England) Wayne Jones	(Wales) Barrie Bates	3–9	(England) Steve Grubb
(England) Ken Mather	9–7	(Australia) Paul Nicholson	(Netherlands) Co Stompé	6–9	(England) Mark Frost
(England) Mark Walsh	9–2	(England) Wayne Mardle	(England) Alex Roy	9–5	(England) Lionel Sams
(England) Andy Jenkins	9–5	(England) Justin Pipe	(England) Steve Brown	8–9	(England) Mark Lawrence
(Netherlands) Raymond van Barneveld	9–4	(England) Ken Dobson	(Netherlands) Roland Scholten	9–6	(England) Darren Johnson
(England) Kevin Painter	9–4	(England) Dave Askew	(Netherlands) Michael van Gerwen 91.45	4–9	(England) Andy Hamilton 95.66
(England) Denis Ovens	3–9	(England) Alan Tabern	(England) Colin Lloyd	9–8	(Canada) John Part
(England) Dave Honey	5–9	(England) Wes Newton	(Netherlands) Jan van der Rassel	7–9	(Netherlands) Jelle Klaasen
(Northern Ireland) Brendan Dolan	7–9	(England) Kevin McDine	(England) Paul Rowley	1–9	(England) Chris Thompson
(England) Andy Roberts	9–7	(England) Louis Blundell	(England) Dennis Priestley	9–4	(England) Colin Monk
(Wales) Mark Webster	9–6	(Scotland) Peter Wright	(England) Andy Smith	9–3	(England) Chris Cooper
(England) Peter Manley 91.67	9–8	(England) James Wade 90.48	(England) Adrian Lewis 94.61	9–2	(Scotland) Robert Thornton 93.26
(England) Mervyn King	8–9	(England) Michael Barnard	(England) Glen Durrant 83.52	1–9	(England) Terry Jenkins 97.56

=== Fourth round ===
- All matches were the best of seventeen legs, and were played on 6 June.

Player #1	Score	Player #2	Player #1	Score	Player #2
(England) Michael Barnard	6–9	(England) Andy Smith	(England) Gary Welding	1–9	(England) Ronnie Baxter
(England) Dennis Priestley	9–8	(England) Mark Frost	(England) Alex Roy	9–8	(England) Andy Roberts
(England) Peter Manley 91.31	4–9	(Wales) Mark Webster 91.01	(England) Steve Grubb	4–9	(England) Kevin Painter
(England) Colin Lloyd	9–2	(England) Chris Thompson	(England) Andy Hamilton 94.16	7–9	(Netherlands) Raymond van Barneveld 94.89
(England) Phil Taylor 115.51	9–3	(England) Ken Mather 93.49	(England) Jamie Caven	9–6	(Netherlands) Jelle Klaasen
(England) Kevin McDine	7–9	(England) Alan Tabern	(England) Andy Jenkins	7–9	(England) Terry Jenkins
(England) Colin Osborne	9–7	(England) Wayne Jones	(England) Mark Walsh 95.06	9–3	(England) Adrian Lewis 88.44
(England) Wes Newton	9–6	(Netherlands) Roland Scholten	(England) Mark Lawrence	9–4	(England) Mark Dudbridge

=== Final stages ===
5th Round
(England) Colin Osborne 93.38	9
(Netherlands) Raymond van Barneveld 91.45	4
(England) Alex Roy	3
(England) Jamie Caven	9
(England) Kevin Painter 93.10	9
(England) Dennis Priestley 85.52	3
(England) Wes Newton	8
(England) Alan Tabern	9
(England) Ronnie Baxter	9
(England) Mark Walsh	4
(Wales) Mark Webster	7
(England) Terry Jenkins	9
(England) Mark Lawrence	9
(England) Colin Lloyd	3
(England) Phil Taylor 103.71	9
(England) Andy Smith	2

Quarter-finals
(England) Colin Osborne 94.86	10
(England) Jamie Caven 95.85	3
(England) Kevin Painter 92.88	10
(England) Alan Tabern 90.75	8
(England) Ronnie Baxter 92.76	10
(England) Terry Jenkins 93.60	7
(England) Mark Lawrence 93.90	0
(England) Phil Taylor 115.62	10

Semi-finals
(England) Colin Osborne 96.51	10
(England) Kevin Painter 94.77	7
(England) Ronnie Baxter 98.10	6
(England) Phil Taylor 105.69	10

Final
(England) Colin Osborne 96.51	6
(England) Phil Taylor 100.80	11

There was a draw after each round; this bracket has been compiled retrospectively.

== See also ==
- UK Open history of event and previous winners
- 2009 in darts includes extended results of Pro Tour events
- PDC Pro Tour history of PDC "floor events"
