= Alex Roy (darts player) =

English darts player (born 1974)

Personal information
- Full name: Alexander Roy
- Nickname: "Ace of Herts"
- Born: 4 September 1974 (age 52) Watford, England
- Home town: Watford, England

Sport
- Sport: Darts
- Darts: 22g Shot
- Laterality: Right-handed
- Walk-on music: "Let Me Entertain You" by Robbie Williams

Organisation (see split in darts)
- PDC: 1998–2018

WDF major events – best performances
- World Masters: Last 32: 1998

PDC premier events – best performances
- World Championship: Last 16: 2000, 2001, 2004, 2008
- World Matchplay: Quarter-finals: 2000, 2003
- World Grand Prix: Last 16: 2001, 2002, 2005, 2007
- UK Open: Quarter-finals: 2005, 2006
- European Championship: Last 32: 2008
- Championship League: Initial groups, 6th, 2008
- Desert Classic: Last 16: 2005
- PC Finals: Last 32: 2009

Other tournament wins
- Years
PDC Challenge Tour England	2014
PDC World Championship Qualifiers	2010
Players Championship Scotland	2008
UK Open North West Regional Final	2005
Vauxhall Spring Pro	2004
Watford Open	2010

Alexander Roy (born 4 September 1974) is an English former professional darts player who competed in events of the Professional Darts Corporation (PDC). He used the nickname Ace of Herts for his matches and was formerly with Dave Holland Management. In the early 2000s, Roy was inside the PDC's top 8 on the Order of Merit.

== PDC career ==
Roy made his first impression on the darts circuit at the 1998 Dutch Open by reaching the semi-finals. He made his World Championship debut in 1999 but lost his first match to Rod Harrington. His overall record in the World Championship was quite disappointing, winning just three matches in his first eight attempts – but four times he has reached the last 16.

He made quarter-final appearances at the World Matchplay in 2000 and 2003 and also at the UK Open in 2005 and 2006.

Roy won his first PDC title in March 2004 by beating Wayne Mardle at the JR+Vauxhall Holiday Park 128 Plus Classic and in May 2004 he reached the final of the Antwerp Open, losing to Colin Lloyd. In the following March he took his first Pro Tour (non-televised) title at the North West Regional Final of the UK Open beating Ronnie Baxter in the final. He has reached two other PDC non-televised finals since – the 2006 Sheppey Classic (losing 5–6 to Colin Osborne) and the 2007 Welsh Players Championship, when he beat Phil Taylor in the last 32 before losing the final to Raymond van Barneveld. He avenged that defeat to van Barneveld the following month at the Irish Players Championship before losing to Adrian Lewis in the quarter finals.

In October 2008 Roy won his first PDC title since March 2005 with victory at the Scottish Players Championship event in Irvine, beating Denis Ovens in a deciding leg in the final with a 161 checkout.

In 2017, Roy qualified for the UK Open through the amateur qualifiers, maintaining his record of qualifying for every UK Open since the inaugural event in 2003. He is one of eight players to have qualified for every event.

Roy quit the PDC in 2018.

== Outside darts ==
Roy is married and has two children. He enjoys fishing and is a supporter of football club Liverpool F.C. Roy makes his main living as a builder.

== World Championship performances ==
=== PDC ===
- 1999: 1st round (lost to Rod Harrington 0–3) (sets)
- 2000: 2nd round (lost to Alan Warriner-Little 0–3)
- 2001: 2nd round (lost to Dave Askew 2–3)
- 2002: 1st round (lost to Colin Lloyd 2–4)
- 2003: 2nd round (lost to Denis Ovens 1–4)
- 2004: 4th round (lost to Alan Warriner-Little 3–4)
- 2005: 3rd round (lost to Phil Taylor 0–4)
- 2006: 1st round (lost to Alan Tabern 2–3)
- 2007: 2nd round (lost to Roland Scholten 3–4)
- 2008: 3rd round (lost to John Part 0–4)
- 2009: 1st round (lost to Kevin McDine 1–3)
- 2010: 1st round (lost to Wayne Jones 1–3)
- 2011: 1st round (lost to Mark Dudbridge 1–3)

== Performance timeline ==
Tournament	1998	1999	2000	2001	2002	2003	2004	2005	2006	2007	2008	2009	2010	2011	2012	2013	2014	2015	2016	2017	2018
PDC World Championship	DNP	1R	2R	2R	1R	2R	4R	3R	1R	2R	3R	1R	1R	1R	Did not participate						
UK Open	Not held					5R	1R	QF	QF	4R	3R	5R	4R	1R	2R	2R	4R	1R	3R	3R	3R
Las Vegas Desert Classic	Not held				DNQ	RR	1R	2R	Did not qualify				Not held								
World Matchplay	DNP		QF	2R	1R	QF	1R	1R	2R	DNQ	1R	Did not qualify									
World Grand Prix	DNP			2R	2R	1R	1R	2R	DNQ	2R	Did not qualify										
European Championship	Not held										1R	Did not qualify									
Players Championship Finals	Not held											1R	Did not qualify								
Winmau World Masters	3R	DNP																2R	Did not participate		

Performance Table Legend
DNP	Did not play at the event	DNQ	Did not qualify for the event	NYF	Not yet founded	#R	lost in the early rounds of the tournament (WR = Wildcard round, RR = Round robin)
QF	lost in the quarter-finals	SF	lost in the semi-finals	F	lost in the final	W	won the tournament
