= Dudbridge (surname) =

Dudbridge is a surname. Notable people with the surname include:

- Frank Dudbridge, British geneticist
- Glen Dudbridge (1938–2017), British sinologist
- Mark Dudbridge (born 1973), English darts player

== See also ==
- Doddridge (surname)
