= 2004 UK Open =

2004 Budweiser UK Open

Tournament information
- Dates: 4–6 June 2004
- Venue: Reebok Stadium
- Location: Bolton
- Country: England
- Organisation(s): PDC
- Format: Legs; Final – best of 21
- Prize fund: £124,000
- Winner's share: £30,000
- Nine-dart finish: (England) Phil Taylor
- High checkout: 170 (England) Phil Taylor

Champion(s)
- (Netherlands) Roland Scholten

The 2004 Budweiser UK Open was the second time the Professional Darts Corporation held the tournament which had quickly earned the nickname the "FA Cup of Darts". It was held at Bolton Wanderers' Reebok Stadium between 4–6 June 2004. Budweiser became the tournament's new sponsor.

Roland Scholten won the title and the tournament featured Phil Taylor's second televised nine-dart finish during his fourth round win over Matt Chapman.

It was also notable for marking the TV debuts of Adrian Lewis and Andy Hamilton.

130 Players qualified via a ranking table played 8 events across the UK & Ireland.

== Prize money ==
| Stage (no. of players) | | Prize money (Total: £124,000) |
|---|---|---|
| Winner | (1) | £30,000 |
| Runner-Up | (1) | £15,000 |
| Semi-finalists | (2) | £7,500 |
| Quarter-finalists | (4) | £4,000 |
| Last 16 (fifth round) | (8) | £2,000 |
| Last 32 (fourth round) | (16) | £1,000 |
| Last 64 (third round) | (32) | £500 |
| Nine-dart finish | (1) | 501 bottles of Budweiser |

== Friday 4 June 2004 ==
=== 1st Round, best of 9 legs ===
128 players started the chase for the title with the lower ranked players. The competition had earned the nickname, "The FA Cup of Darts" by the nature of its random draw for each round - and there was the extraordinary pairing of former world champions John Lowe against Keith Deller in the first round. Lowe, who had been missing several tournaments on the circuit at the time opted to withdraw from the event so Deller received a bye into round two.

Steve Evans against the Welshman Marshall James in the former 1997 world championship finalist by 5–4 in the preliminary round, Alex Roy showed the worst of his form and temperament against "Odd Job" James Barton, an electrical tester from Bradford. Barton edged Roy out 5-4. Richie Burnett was very poor against Eamon Davies who comfortably beat the Welshman 5-3. Rod Harrington hadn't qualified for a televised tournament for a year and even though his darts were now not falling out of the board, he narrowly lost out to Bedfordshire's Derek Hunt 5-4.

Alan Green took out another known face, Leeds player Dave Smith 5-4 and 'The Horse' Reg Harding was also going home early, as was last year's finalist Shayne Burgess who lost 5-2 to Lee Rose. Mick Manning lost 5-1 to Graeme Stoddart and Cliff Lazarenko stormed through to round two courtesy of a 5-1 win over Andrew Davies. Dennis Harbour beat the only lady in the competition Deta Hedman 5-2 and Dutchman Jan van der Rassel started strongly by beating Steve Ritchie 5-1.

Best match of the first round was former BDO player Colin Monk (now full-time with the PDC) against Lee Palfreyman who was last seen on TV in the Las Vegas tournament two years ago. It was a belter of a game with Monk edging out Palfreyman 5-4. Both players averaged around 96.0 in the match.

==== Preliminary round ====
- (England) Ian Eames – Gary Thomson (England) 5 – 4
- (Wales) Marshall James – Steve Evans (Wales) 4 – 5
- (England) Peter Evison – Dave Roberts (Wales) 5 – 2

==== Results ====
- (England) Alex Roy - James Barton (England) 4 - 5
- (Wales) Richie Burnett - Eamon Davies (England) 3 - 5
- (England) John Lowe - Keith Deller (England) Bye
- (England) Colin Monk - Lee Palfreyman (England) 5 - 4
- (England) Reg Harding - Dale Pinch (Wales) 3 - 5
- (England) Derek Hunt - Rod Harrington (England) 5 - 4
- (England) Andrew Stevenson - Peter Evison (England) 4 - 5
- (Scotland) Stewart Rattray - Mick Kenway (England) 5 - 2
- (England) Phil Rawson - Ian Covill (England) 3 - 5
- (Wales) Steve Evans - Andy Belton (England) 5 - 4
- (England) John Watson - Kelvin Painter (Wales) 2 - 5
- (England) Alan Green - Dave Smith (England) 5 - 4
- (Jersey) Mark Holyoake - Kevin Rudling (England) 5 - 4
- (Northern Ireland) John MaGowan - Moe Whelan (Republic of Ireland) 5 - 0
- (England) John King - Ian Eames (England) 4 - 5
- (England) Dave Ladley - Andrew Findley (England) 5 - 0
- (Wales) Steve Gillett - Nigel Peden (Northern Ireland) 5 - 2
- (Northern Ireland) Brendan Dolan - Jimmy Dunlop (England) 2 - 5
- (England) Gary Stevens - Al Hedman (Jamaica) 5 - 2
- (Netherlands) Jan van der Rassel - Steve Ritchie (Scotland) 5 - 1
- (England) Tim Daniels - Tom Kirby (Republic of Ireland) 3 - 5
- (England) Ian Lever - Mark Harris (Guernsey) 5 - 4
- (Northern Ireland) Ray Farrell - Steve Hine (England) Bye
- (Wales) Dean Williams - Tony Smith (England) 1 - 5
- (England) Shayne Burgess - Lee Rose (Jersey) 2 - 5
- (Wales) Derek Williams - Bob Crawley (England) 5 - 3
- (England) Steve Smith - Rikki Blay (England) 4 - 5
- (England) Dennis Harbour - Deta Hedman (England) 5 - 2
- (Wales) Andrew Davies - Cliff Lazarenko (England) 1 - 5
- (England) James Wheatley - Sam Rooney (England) 2 - 5
- (England) Mick Manning - Graeme Stoddart (England) 1 - 5

=== 2nd Round, best of 9 legs ===
Another 32 players entered the fray for the second round and perhaps not quite as many shocks this time. A slimmed down Alan Warriner who had shed two stones in weight since his last TV appearance got off to a shaky start trailing 3-0 to Eddie Lovely. However the "Ice Man" dug deep and ended up the winner 5-4.

The previous year's local hero Paul Williams was edged out 5-4 by Ian Covill and other local 'The Natural' Les Fitton stormed to a 5-0 win over Tony Smith. Matt Clark went through as did Tom Kirby 5-3 against Keith Wetton. "Fat Boy" Andy Keen took out Simon Whatley 5-2 and Mark Landers beat New Zealand's Tom Williams 5-1. "Uncle Fester" Ritchie Buckle lost out 5-4 to David Platt, who was a "9 dart" challenge qualifier for the 2003 world championship.

Tracking those who came through from the first round, "Odd Job" James Barton won again by beating Alex MacKay 5-4. Dennis Harbour also won again beating the fancied Welshman Wayne Atwood 5-4. "Big" Cliff Lazarenko took out Graeme Stoddart 5-3 and Colin Monk had a slightly easier game this time beating Mark Holyoake 5-2.

==== Results ====
- (England) Paul Williams - Ian Covill (England) 4 - 5
- (England) James Wade - Gary Stevens (England) 5 - 3
- (Scotland) Jamie Harvey - Sean Palfrey (Wales) 3 - 5
- (England) Dennis Harbour - Wayne Atwood (Wales) 5 - 4
- (New Zealand) Tom Williams - Mark Landers (England) 1 - 5
- (England) Wesley Newton - Ian Whillis (England) 4 - 5
- (Jersey) Lee Rose - Robbie Green (England) 1 - 5
- (England) Norman Fletcher - Les Hodkinson (England) 5 - 2
- (Republic of Ireland) Tom Kirby - Keith Wetton (England) 5 - 3
- (England) Steve Johnson - Derek Hunt (England) 5 - 4
- (England) Peter Allen - Derek Williams (Wales) 5 - 1
- (England) Tony Smith - Les Fitton (Jersey) 0 - 5
- (England) Dave Ladley - Barrie Bates (Wales) 4 - 5
- (England) Alan Green - Steve Smith (England) 5 - 2
- (England) Peter Evison - Keith Deller (England) 5 - 3
- (England) Sam Rooney - Matt Clark (England) 2 - 5
- (England) Graeme Stoddart - Cliff Lazarenko (England) 3 - 5
- (Belgium) Erik Clarys - Ian Eames (England) 5 - 0
- (Northern Ireland) John MaGowan - Steve Hine (England) 5 - 2
- (England) Colin Monk - Mark Holyoake (Jersey) 5 - 2
- (England) Ritchie Buckle - David Platt (Australia) 4 - 5
- (Netherlands) Jan van der Rassel - Ken Thomas (Wales) 5 - 2
- (Wales) Dale Pinch - Steve Evans (Wales) 4 - 5
- (England) Simon Whatley - Andy Keen (Malta) 2 - 5
- (England) Ian Lever - Eamon Davies (England) 3 - 5
- (Scotland) Alex MacKay - James Barton (England) 4 - 5
- (England) Ritchie Blake - Robbie Widdows (England) 3 - 5
- (England) Vic Hubbard - Steve Gillett (Wales) 5 - 0
- (Wales) Martyn Freeman - Paul Dillon (Northern Ireland) 5 - 0
- (Wales) Kelvin Painter - Jimmy Dunlop (England) 5 - 1
- (England) Lionel Sams - Stewart Rattray (Scotland) 5 - 2

== Saturday 5 June ==
=== 3rd Round, best of 15 legs ===
The day allowed all those who qualified in the top places during the regional finals. The format was now best of 15 legs, so people had more time to prepare to play for the seasoned dart players.

Darren Webster went down 5-0 to James Wade and it looked all over. However he amazingly pulled the match back to 5-5 before Wade ultimately squeezed through 8-7. Mark Dudbridge and Roland Scholten were neck and neck at 4-4 with all legs going with the throw, Dudbridge even managing the first six perfect darts of a potential 9 darter. However Scholten took a leg against the throw and then stormed ahead to an 8-5 win.

Friday's hero James Barton finally met his match against rising star Mark Walsh who went into round four with an 8-3 win. However Cliff Lazarenko notched up his third win of the tournament edging out Robbie Green 8-7.

Wayne Mardle appeared to struggle for a while against Vic Hubbard before winning through. He joked with interviewer Helen Chamberlain that his wayward throws into the fives were a tactic. Mardle also commented that he is now a full-time pro having quit his accounts job in the City of London.

Dennis Priestley looked to be in good form as he edged out Terry Jenkins 8-7. Priestley commented that while playing on a 'minor' board that the noise and calling from the main stage was off putting. He also said that he was probably the only player brave enough to voice his opinion on this matter!

Les Fitton again produced a whitewash beating Steve Parsons 8-0. That was 13 legs on the trot to 'The Natural' without a loss! John Part took out Eamon Davies 8-4 and commented that his World no. 1 ranking could be a bit false. He suggested we wait for the official rankings after the World Matchplay to see who really is top of the pile.

Phil Taylor had a difficult match against Steve Maish, a player soaring up the PDC rankings list. Taylor won 8-3 but averaged only around 93.0. A bit of Taylor magic was evident though as he took out a 170 - the highest finish. Maish threw six perfect darts and perhaps thought of a 9-darter. He said to Taylor afterwards that he didn't realise he'd have got nothing for it. Taylor later joked, "If he'd hit it, I'd have given him a tenner."

Shock of the round was Peter Manley the no.1 qualifier going straight out to Matt Chapman. 'The Sheriff' Erik Clarys got through to the last 32 as did Peter Evison. No such luck for Lionel Sams who was edged out by Henry O'Neill. Form player before the tournament Colin Lloyd really struggled against 57-year-old Tom Kirby before muscling through 8-6 and Dutchman Jan van der Rassel won his third match taking out Mark Landers 8-4.

==== Results ====
- Roland Scholten - Mark Dudbridge 8 - 4
- Eamon Davies - John Part 4 - 8
- Steve Maish - Phil Taylor 3 - 8
- Tom Kirby - Colin Lloyd 6 - 8
- Vic Hubbard - Wayne Mardle 3 - 8
- Kevin Painter - Kelvin Painter 8 - 5
- Mark Landers - Jan van der Rassel 4 - 8
- Steve Beaton - Dave Askew 8 - 4
- Mark Walsh - James Barton 8 - 5
- Alan Warriner - Mark Robinson 8 - 5
- Alan Reynolds - Sean Palfrey 7 - 8
- Matt Chapman - Peter Manley 8 - 4
- Darren Webster - James Wade 7 - 8
- Bob Anderson - Peter Allen 8 - 5
- Les Fitton - Steve Parsons 8 - 0
- Alan Green - Erik Clarys 5 - 8
- Dennis Harbour - Adrian Lewis 8 - 7
- Andy Keen - Dennis Smith 4 - 8
- Andy Jenkins - Michael Barnard 8 - 7
- Barrie Bates - Ronnie Baxter 5 - 8
- Adrian Gray - Norman Fletcher 8 - 3
- Alan Caves - Robbie Widdows 8 - 7
- Lionel Sams - Henry O'Neill 7 - 8
- Steve Johnson - John MaGowan 4 - 8
- Robbie Green - Cliff Lazarenko 7 - 8
- David Platt - Andy Hayfield 8 - 6
- Peter Evison - Ian Whillis 8 - 4
- Martyn Freeman - Matt Clark 8 - 6
- Terry Jenkins - Dennis Priestley 7 - 8
- Wayne Jones - Colin Monk 2 - 8
- Denis Ovens - Mark Thomson 8 - 4
- Ian Covill - Steve Evans 5 - 8

=== 4th Round, best of 15 legs ===
Andy Jenkins whitewashed Martin Freeman 8-0 for a place in the last 16. John Part had a harder task facing the ever improving Bob Anderson. Anderson led 6-5 and then John Part checked out a beautiful 160 to tie the game. This must have rocked Anderson and Part took the final two legs to make it 8-6.

Alan Warriner raced to a 6-0 lead against Cliff Lazarenko. It was too much for the big man to claw back but he finished with a respectable losing scoreline of 8-4. Ronnie Baxter sailed through to the last 16 as did 62-year-old John Magowan.

Colin Lloyd and James Wade was a match that went to the wire. At 7-7 Lloyd had first throw. He threw 40 which tossed the advantage in Wade's direction. Wade then threw only 24 and Lloyd persevered to win the leg and the match.

Both Peter Evison and Jan van der Rassel had done well in the tournament thus far and in another 8-7 game, "The Fen Tiger" just eclipsed the impressive Van Der Rassel. Alan Caves beat Dennis Smith 8-3 and 'The Natural' Les Fitton continued with his strong form to almost get the better of world finalist Kevin Painter. After his 8-6 win Painter said, "Les is either rubbish or he's brilliant. He's a bit of a spaceship!"

Match of the round had to be Phil Taylor against young Matt Chapman who had taken the scalp of Peter Manley in round three. Taylor won the match 8-2 with an average of 111.0 and made history by taking out his second live televised nine darter, the only player in darts history to do so.

Commentator John Gwynne's quote of "He is very-very extraordinary!!" goes down in darts history along with the nine darter and sums it up. Co-commentator Stuart Pyke noted that Taylor had achieved this without having played a competitive match for six months. The whole of the stadium erupted after the nine darter with the crowd singing for many minutes. Ritchie Buckle was spotted singing along with the crowd and Colin Lloyd stopped his live TV interview to give Taylor a round of applause.

Taylor felt this one was easy because there was no special prize for a nine darter in the tournament so as he threw the final three darts he thought "just do it." And he did! It was reported afterwards that tournament sponsors Budweiser were to present Taylor with 501 bottles of beer for his achievement!

==== Results ====
- John Part - Bob Anderson 8 - 6
- Phil Taylor - Matt Chapman 8 - 2
- Kevin Painter - Les Fitton 8 - 6
- Steve Beaton - Erik Clarys 8 - 6
- Sean Palfrey - Ronnie Baxter 5 - 8
- James Wade - Colin Lloyd 7 - 8
- Martyn Freeman - Andy Jenkins 0 - 8
- Denis Ovens - Mark Walsh 8 - 5
- Steve Evans - John MaGowan 5 - 8
- Jan van der Rassel - Peter Evison 5 - 8
- Dennis Priestley - Adrian Gray 8 - 4
- David Platt - Colin Monk 4 - 8
- Alan Warriner - Cliff Lazarenko 8 - 4
- Alan Caves - Dennis Smith 8 - 3
- Roland Scholten - Henry O'Neill 8 - 6
- Dennis Harbour - Wayne Mardle 6 - 8

== Sunday 6 June ==
=== 5th Round - Last 16, best of 15 legs ===
Dennis Priestley got an advantage of 4-0 over John Part in the UK Open match, after which John scored four successive legs to tie the game at 4-4. John Part went ahead 5-4 when he made a checkout of 156, but Priestley tied the match at 6-6. In the next leg, Dennis Priestley started by scoring six perfect shots on his first throw, with the aim of completing a nine-dart leg, but he eventually won that leg to take a 7-6 lead. When Priestley failed to score his match shot, Part drew the game 7-7 and won the leg to win 8-7.

Andy Jenkins raced off to a 5-0 lead against Colin Monk with an average of over 103.0 but the latter pulled it back to 7-6. Jenkins took the next leg to win 8-6. Alan Warriner also went into the quarter finals beating Alan Caves 8-3.

Denis Ovens and Roland Scholten was neck and neck all the way until Scholten pulled clear at the end for an 8-6 win. John MaGowan went 6-1 up against Kevin Painter and appeared to have the game won but Painter clawed 7 legs on the trot to win 8-6. Colin Lloyd raced to a 6-2 lead against Ronnie Baxter but the latter pulled the game back to 7-7. Lloyd then won the decider for his place in the quarter finals.

Wayne Mardle went into a 4-2 lead against Phil Taylor but "The Power" brought it back to 4-4. At 5-5 Taylor took out a 155 checkout to lead 6-5. The match was neck and neck again going to 7-7. Both players had darts for the match but it was Taylor who hit the double 5 to win. Apparently no love lost between them at the start of the match Phil Taylor seemed to begrudgingly shake Mardle's hand. Apparently at the world championships Wayne Mardle was annoyed that Phil Taylor had brought in a pop star friend to their post match interview. After this game Mardle said, "I'm throwing down the gauntlet - I'm going to beat him." Throughout their post-match interview the players were turned away from each other, Taylor almost with his back to Mardle.

==== Results ====
- Andy Jenkins - Colin Monk 8 - 6
- Phil Taylor - Wayne Mardle 8 - 7
- Dennis Priestley - John Part 7 - 8
- Ronnie Baxter - Colin Lloyd 7 - 8
- Alan Caves - Alan Warriner 3 - 8
- Peter Evison - Steve Beaton 5 - 8
- Denis Ovens - Roland Scholten 6 - 8
- Kevin Painter - John MaGowan 8 - 6

=== Quarter-finals, best of 15 legs ===
Steve Beaton started well against Kevin Painter going 4–2 ahead. He maintained this advantage going 7-4 and ultimately 8-5 to win a place in the semi-finals. After the match Beaton said that he'd stopped smoking a few months ago and decided that he wouldn't be practising for the semi-final and that he'd just chill out before the next match.

Andy Jenkins and Colin Lloyd was a much more tense affair. Jenkins went 3-1 up but Lloyd pulled it back to 3-3. Jenkins then led again at 6-4 but again Lloyd squared the match at 6-6. Jenkins then threw six perfect darts and though the nine darter wasn't on it was enough to lead again at 7-6. He took the match 8-6 and it was an accomplished performance from "Rocky" who started four legs with a maximum.

Match of the round was undoubtedly Phil Taylor and John Part. The live draw placed them on board two much to Taylor's consternation. Part had played on this board before with all the distractions from the main board, but it was a first for Taylor. Part took an early break of throw to go 3-1 up. Taylor broke back and took it to 3 a piece. Part again went into the lead at 5-3 and Taylor once again squared the match at 5-5, then 6-6. As Part said afterwards he just kept his confidence and self-belief high and this was enough to win this tussle with "The Power" 8–6.

Roland Scholten went 3–1 up against Alan Warriner who had said that he'd changed his darts three times since the world championships. Warriner took three on the trot to go ahead 4–3 before Scholten dug deep to take the next three legs. The match ultimately finished 8–6 to Scholten who said afterwards that he was happy with the way he was playing. Asked about the forthcoming semifinal, Scholten said that he would try to play to his ability and see what happened.

==== Results ====
- Phil Taylor - John Part 6 - 8
- Roland Scholten - Alan Warriner 8 - 6
- Steve Beaton - Kevin Painter 8 - 5
- Andy Jenkins - Colin Lloyd 8 - 6

=== Semi-finals, best of 15 legs ===
John Part and Andy Jenkins was another close game. Part was the first to admit he didn't play well in the match. Jenkins took an early 3-2 lead courtesy of a 121 checkout. Part then clawed ahead and kept a one leg advantage up until 6-5 when Jenkins then squared the match again. Ultimately 8-7 to Part who said afterwards that he felt Andy Jenkins had control of the match and that he was "pretty lucky" to get through to the final.

Steve Beaton shot out of the starting blocks against "The Tripod" Roland Scholten going 3-0 up. However where in the past the Dutchman had caved in during the closing stages of a tournament, this time it was a different Roland Scholten. Beaton only took one more leg in the match which went 8-4 to Scholten.

==== Results ====
- John Part - Andy Jenkins 8 - 7
- Steve Beaton - Roland Scholten 4 - 8

=== Final, best of 21 legs ===
Scholten blasted off to a 6-1 lead in this first to 11 legs race courtesy of some impeccable finishing. Part continued to be somewhat off the boil as Scholten took the match to 8-3. Finally Part seemed to get some rhythm going as he won the next two legs to make it 8-5. Scholten won the next and in the fifteenth leg after a 180 by Scholten, Part threw some really wayward darts. At 10-6, Scholten signalled his intent by throwing back to back 180s and the match and the UK Open title was his, along with the payout cheque of £30,000. Part admitted after the match that Roland deserved to be the champion.

Scholten himself said, "The competition is so hard. The day really starts at 7:30 and you are on the go until 10:30 at night. It took lots of focusing and concentration. I'm well happy. My form's been doubtful but I took a lot of confidence from the first and second day. When I reached the final I thought that I might as well do it now. I hope it's a turnaround. A brilliant crowd, a long day and thanks very much!"

==== Result ====
- John Part - Roland Scholten 6 - 11
