= 1996 Denmark Open darts =

Denmark Open

Tournament information
- Dates: 1996
- Country: Denmark
- Organisation(s): BDO, WDF, DDU

Champion(s)
- (England) Ronnie Baxter

1996 Denmark Open is a darts tournament, which took place in Denmark in 1996.

== Results ==
Round	Player
Winner	(England) Ronnie Baxter
Final	(Belgium) Leo Laurens
Semi-finals	(Wales) Richie Burnett
Semi-finals	(Netherlands) Roland Scholten
Quarter-finals	(England) Mervyn King
Quarter-finals	(England) Paul Williams
Quarter-finals	(England) Denis Ovens
Quarter-finals	(England) Andy Jenkins
Last 16	(Northern Ireland) John MaGowan
Last 16	(England) Andy Fordham
Last 16	(Germany) Andreas Krockel
Last 16	(Wales) Marshall James
Last 16	(Australia) Wayne Weening
Last 16	(Germany) Colin Rice
Last 16	(Denmark) Per Skau
Last 16	(Netherlands) Raymond van Barneveld
