= 2006 UK Open =

2006 Budweiser UK Open

Tournament information
- Dates: 9–11 June 2006
- Venue: Reebok Stadium
- Location: Bolton
- Country: England
- Organisation(s): PDC
- Format: Legs
- Prize fund: £124,000
- Winner's share: £30,000

Champion(s)
- (Netherlands) Raymond van Barneveld

The 2006 Budweiser UK Open was the fourth year of the UK Open darts tournament organised by the Professional Darts Corporation. It was held at the Reebok Stadium, Bolton, between 9–11 June 2006.

Phil Taylor was the defending champion but got knocked out at the quarter-final stage by Raymond van Barneveld. Van Barneveld went on to win the title, winning 13–7 against Barrie Bates in the final.

== Format ==
Qualifying events were held at Greene King pubs across the UK – winners from each pub event progressed to one of four Regional Finals, to be staged in their relevant area. Players who reach the final eight in the Regional Finals will qualify for the televised stages of the UK Open in Bolton.

In addition there were eight UK Open Regional Finals for the "professional" players. All events were open to all darts players on payment of an entry fee – which means that players from both the PDC and BDO were eligible to enter. Players who enter through the Greene King Qualifying Round were not eligible to play in the regional qualifying events and vice versa.

The results of the eight qualifiers were then collated into an Order of Merit table (Winner £4000; Runner-up £2000; 3–4 £1000; 5–8 £500; 9–16 £250; 17–32 £100; 33–64 £50). The top 96 players plus ties in this Order of Merit join the 32 Greene King qualifiers at the televised stages in Bolton.

1st round
Players who were ranked between 65 and 96 in the UK Open Order of Merit join the 32 Greene King qualifiers in the first round of the UK Open.

2nd round
Players ranked 33 to 64 join the first round winners.

3rd round
Players ranked in the top 32 join the second round winners.

== 2005/2006 UK Open Regional Finals ==
25 September 2005 (Welsh) Mark Walsh 2–1 Phil Taylor
23 October 2005 (Irish) Colin Lloyd 2–1 Andy Smith
6 November 2005 (Scottish) Adrian Lewis 2–0 Colin Lloyd
8 January 2006 (North East) Kevin Painter 2–0 Colin Lloyd
12 February 2006 (South West) Mark Dudbridge 2–0 Dennis Priestley
5 March 2006 (Southern) Chris Mason 2–1 Barrie Bates
19 March 2006 (North West) Alan Tabern 2–1 Steve Maish
9 April 2006 (Midlands) Raymond van Barneveld 2–0 Ronnie Baxter

== UK Open Qualifiers ==
=== Top 32 in UK Open Order of Merit (receiving byes into third round) ===
1. (England) Colin Lloyd
2. (England) Adrian Lewis
3. (England) Kevin Painter
4. (England) Mark Dudbridge
5. (England) Chris Mason
6. (England) Dennis Priestley
7. (Netherlands) Raymond van Barneveld
8. (England) Mark Walsh
9. (England) Alan Tabern
10. (Wales) Barrie Bates
11. (England) Ronnie Baxter
12. (England) Steve Maish
13. (England) Phil Taylor
14. (England) Andy Smith
15. (England) Andy Jenkins
16. (England) Alex Roy
17. (England) Colin Monk
18. (England) James Wade
19. (England) Terry Jenkins
20. (England) Peter Manley
21. (England) Denis Ovens
22. (England) Andy Hamilton
23. (Republic of Ireland) Tom Kirby
24. (England) Alan Warriner-Little
25. (England) Lionel Sams
26. (Wales) Richie Burnett
27. (Canada) John Part
28. (England) Matt Clark
29. (England) Wayne Mardle
30. (Republic of Ireland) Owen Caffrey
31. (England) Wayne Jones
32. (England) Bob Anderson

=== Numbers 33–64 of UK Open of Merit (receiving byes into second round) ===
33. (England) Peter Allen
34. (England) Darren Latham
35. (England) Wes Newton
36. (England) Steve Beaton
37. (England) Ian Whillis
38. (England) Jimmy Mann
39. (England) Dave Askew
40. (England) Robbie Widdows
41. (Republic of Ireland) Mick McGowan
42. (Northern Ireland) John MaGowan
43. (England) Robbie Green
44. (England) Colin Osborne
45. (Netherlands) Roland Scholten
46. (England) Keith Deller
47. (England) Jason Roberts
48. (England) Kevin Pearson
49. (England) Mark Robinson
50. (Belgium) Erik Clarys
51. (England) Steve Hine
52. (Wales) Alan Reynolds
53. (Scotland) Jason Clark
54. (England) Michael Barnard
55. (England) Simon Whatley
56. (England) Gary Welding
57. (England) Lee Palfreyman
58. (England) Andy Callaby
59. (England) Dennis Smith
60. (England) Matt Chapman
61. (England) Adrian Gray
62. (England) Vic Hubbard
63. (England) Mark Frost
64. (Northern Ireland) Henry O'Neill

=== Remaining numbers of UK Open of Merit (starting in first and preliminary round) ===
65. (England) Alan Green
66. (England) Bob Crawley
67. (England) Steve Coote
68. (England) Cliff Lazarenko
69. (England) Tony Smith
70. (England) Darren Williams
71. (Wales) Wayne Atwood
72. (England) Steve Johnson
73. (England) Rikki Blay
74. (England) Graeme Stoddart
75. (England) Paul Everson
76. (England) Shayne Burgess
77. (England) Darren Johnson
78. (Australia) David Platt
79. (England) Kevin Dowling
80. (England) Tom Wilson
81. (Wales) Sean Palfrey
82. (England) Dave Honey
83. (England) Paul Williams
84. (England) Dave Johnson
85. (England) Gary Noonan
86. (England) Andy Hayfield
87. (Scotland) Jamie Harvey
88. (Belgium) Yves Cottenge
89. (England) Alan Caves
90. (England) Norman Fletcher
91. (England) Simon Craven
92. (England) Dave Jowett
93. (Belgium) Rocco Maes
94. (Netherlands) Jan van der Rassel
95. (England) Chris Allen
96. (Belgium) Guy Christyn
97. (England) Eddie Lovely
98. (England) Kevin Spiolek
99. (England) Mark Thomson
100. (England) Darren Webster
101. (Wales) Steve Evans
102. (Scotland) Shaun McDonald
103. (Jamaica) Al Hedman

=== Greene King Qualifiers ===
- (Scotland) Stuart Pickles
- (England) Nicky Turner
- (England) Geoff Harkup
- (Australia) Wayne Brown
- (England) Pip Brown
- (England) Ian McLean
- (England) David Fairbrass
- (England) Danny Pinhorne
- (England) Chris Hill
- (England) Johnny Haines
- (England) Jess Archer
- (England) Lee Rose
- (Wales) Peter Locke
- (England) Kevin Dalwood
- (Wales) John Harris
- (England) Peter Hall
- (England) Peter Dillingham
- (England) Mick Chambers
- (Northern Ireland) Perry Regan
- (England) Wayne Squirrell
- (Netherlands) Coen Wiekamp
- (England) Gary Miller
- (England) Lee Topper
- (England) Gary Barnett
- (England) Tom Murphy
- (England) Tom Allies
- (England) Nigel Langton
- (England) John Nesbitt
- (England) Glenn Baxter
- (Wales) James Dorenbos
- (England) Ian Haines
- (England) John Quantock
- (England) Dave Whitcombe

== Friday 9 June ==
=== Preliminary round, best of 11 legs ===
Player	Score	Player
(England) Eddie Lovely	3–6	(England) Norman Fletcher
(England) Mark Thomson	6–4	(England) Kevin Spiolek
(Wales) Steve Evans	3–6	(Netherlands) Jan van der Rassel
(England) Simon Craven	6–2	(Belgium) Guy Christyn
(England) Dave Jowett	6–4	(England) Darren Webster
(England) John Quantock	5–6	(Scotland) Shaun McDonald
(Wales) Peter Locke	6–3	(England) Dave Whitcombe
(England) Cliff Lazarenko	6–5	(Jamaica) Al Hedman

=== 1st Round, best of 11 legs ===
Player	Score	Player
(England) Steve Coote	6–3	(England) Kevin Dalwood
(England) Paul Williams	3–6	(England) Gary Noonan
(England) Alan Caves	5–6	(Wales) Sean Palfrey
(England) Cliff Lazarenko	3–6	(England) Shayne Burgess
(England) Bob Crawley	6–2	(England) Alan Green
(Scotland) Jamie Harvey	6–2	(England) Wayne Squirrell
(England) Tom Wilson	5–6	(England) Kevin Dowling
(England) Steve Johnson	6–3	(England) Pip Brown
(Northern Ireland) Perry Regan	6–5	(Wales) James Dorenbos
(England) Danny Pinhorne	4–6	(Belgium) Rocco Maes
(England) Ian Haines	6–2	(England) Andy Hayfield
(England) Darren Williams	6–5	(Australia) Wayne Brown
(England) Chris Hill	3–6	(England) Geoff Harkup
(England) John Harris	1–6	(England) Jess Archer
(England) Chris Allen	6–3	(England) Paul Everson
(England) Norman Fletcher	6–3	(Wales) Peter Locke

Player	Score	Player
(Belgium) Yves Cottenge	6–2	(England) Lee Rose
(England) Darren Johnson	6–4	(England) Rikki Blay
(England) Glen Baxter	1–6	(England) Graeme Stoddart
(England) Gary Barnett	6–1	(England) Peter Dillingham
(England) David Fairbrass	6–1	(England) Tony Smith
(England) Tom Murphy	1–6	(Wales) Wayne Atwood
(England) Peter Hall	1–6	(England) Lee Topper
(England) Mark Thomson	2–6	(England) Nigel Langton
(Australia) David Platt	6–4	(England) Mick Chambers
(Netherlands) Jan van der Rassel	6–2	(Netherlands) Coen Wiekamp
(England) Stuart Pickles	6–2	(England) Gary Miller
(England) Darren Webster	6–0	(England) Ian McLean
(England) Nicky Turner	6–1	(England) Tom Allies
(Scotland) Shaun McDonald	6–0	(England) John Nesbitt
(England) Johnny Haines	6–3	(England) Dave Johnson
(England) Dave Honey	6–1	(England) Simon Craven

=== 2nd Round, best of 15 legs ===
Player	Score	Player
(England) Kevin Dowling	8–3	(England) Shayne Burgess
(England) Jess Archer	4–8	(England) Jason Roberts
(England) Bob Crawley	3–8	(England) Ian Whillis
(Northern Ireland) John MaGowan	8–6	(Belgium) Rocco Maes
(England) Geoff Harkup	8–5	(England) Steve Johnson
(England) Michael Barnard	8–1	(England) Nigel Langton
(Republic of Ireland) Mick McGowan	8–6	(Belgium) Yves Cottenjé
(England) Lee Topper	8–4	(England) Stuart Pickles
(England) Simon Whatley	8–1	(England) Dave Honey
(England) Mark Robinson	8–3	(England) David Fairbrass
(England) Gary Barnett	6–8	(England) Gary Welding
(England) Darren Latham	8–7	(England) Peter Allen
(England) Robbie Widdows	8–4	(England) Andy Hayfield
(England) Graeme Stoddart	8–2	(England) Nicky Turner
(England) Darren Webster	6–8	(England) Darren Johnson
(England) Mark Frost	1–8	(Wales) Alan Reynolds

Player	Score	Player
(England) Dennis Smith	5–8	(England) Adrian Gray
(England) Robbie Green	8–7	(Scotland) Jamie Harvey
(England) Keith Deller	8–6	(England) Steve Beaton
(Netherlands) Roland Scholten	8–3	(England) Vic Hubbard
(England) Colin Osborne	8–5	(Scotland) Jason Clark
(Northern Ireland) Henry O'Neill	5–8	(England) Wesley Newton
(England) Matt Chapman	4–8	(England) Jimmy Mann
(Australia) David Platt	6–8	(England) Andy Callaby
(Wales) Sean Palfrey	7–8	(England) Kevin Pearson
(Wales) Wayne Atwood	8–6	(England) Johnny Haines
(England) Steve Coote	8–3	(Scotland) Shaun McDonald
(England) Chris Allen	8–6	(England) Perry Regan
(Netherlands) Jan van der Rassel	3–8	(England) Lee Palfreyman
(England) Gary Noonan	8–4	(England) Darren Williams
(England) Dave Askew	8–0	(England) Norman Fletcher
(England) Steve Hine	(Note: Steve Hine received a bye in his match versus Eric Clarys.)	(Belgium) Erik Clarys

== Saturday 10 June ==
=== 3rd Round, best of 15 legs ===
Player	Score	Player
(England) Matt Clark	8–6	(England) Steve Coote
(England) Jason Roberts	7–8	(England) Alan Tabern
(England) Darren Johnson	5–8	(England) Graeme Stoddart
(England) Adrian Lewis	8–1	(England) Kevin Dowling
(England) Geoff Harkup (Q)	1–8	(England) Terry Jenkins
(England) Jimmy Mann	8–2	(England) Colin Monk
(Republic of Ireland) Owen Caffrey	3–8	(England) Denis Ovens
(England) Gary Welding	3–8	(Canada) John Part
(England) Chris Allen	5–8	(England) Dennis Priestley
(England) Gary Noonan	4–8	(England) Phil Taylor
(Wales) Barrie Bates	8–6	(Wales) Wayne Atwood
(England) Kevin Pearson	1–8	(England) Alex Roy
(England) Robbie Green	8–4	(England) Chris Mason
(Netherlands) Roland Scholten	8–5	(England) Peter Manley
(England) Simon Whatley	0–8	(Netherlands) Raymond van Barneveld
(England) Mark Robinson	3–8	(England) Adrian Gray

Player	Score	Player
(England) Robbie Widdows	2–8	(England) Keith Deller
(Republic of Ireland) Mick McGowan	7–8	(England) Mark Walsh
(England) Steve Maish	8–6	(England) Colin Osborne
(England) Andy Jenkins	8–7	(Wales) Alan Reynolds
(England) Wayne Jones	8–3	(England) Steve Hine
(Northern Ireland) John MaGowan	8–5	(England) Kevin Painter
(England) Andy Hamilton	8–4	(England) Lee Topper (Q)
(Wales) Richie Burnett	5–8	(England) Bob Anderson
(England) Wesley Newton	8–7	(England) Darren Latham
(England) Dave Askew	8–3	(England) Mark Dudbridge
(England) Ian Whillis	4–8	(England) Wayne Mardle
(England) Michael Barnard	8–4	(England) Lee Palfreyman
(Republic of Ireland) Tom Kirby	7–8	(England) Andy Callaby
(England) Andy Smith	8–6	(England) James Wade
(England) Colin Lloyd	8–2	(England) Alan Warriner – Little
(England) Lionel Sams	3–8	(England) Ronnie Baxter

=== 4th Round, best of 21 legs ===
Player	Score	Player
(England) Adrian Lewis	11–10	(England) Wayne Mardle
(England) Dave Askew	3–11	(England) Phil Taylor
(England) Steve Maish	3–11	(England) Colin Lloyd
(England) Jimmy Mann	4–11	(Netherlands) Raymond van Barneveld
(England) Bob Anderson	11–4	(England) Dennis Priestley
(England) Graeme Stoddart	5–11	(England) Alex Roy
(England) Keith Deller	7–11	(England) Terry Jenkins
(England) Andy Smith	7–11	(England) Alan Tabern

Player	Score	Player
(England) Wesley Newton	5–11	(England) Denis Ovens
(England) Michael Barnard	7–11	(England) Ronnie Baxter
(England) Wayne Jones	8–11	(Wales) Barrie Bates
(England) Andy Hamilton	6–11	(Canada) John Part
(England) Mark Walsh	6–11	(England) Robbie Green
(England) Matt Clark	4–11	(Northern Ireland) John MaGowan
(Netherlands) Roland Scholten	11–5	(England) Andy Jenkins
(England) Andy Callaby	11–6	(England) Adrian Gray

== Sunday 11 June ==
=== Last 16 to Final ===
5th Round; Best of 21 legs
Raymond van Barneveld 94.71	11
Bob Anderson 84.93	3
Phil Taylor 99.72	11
Colin Lloyd 93.00	2
John MaGowan	11
Adrian Lewis	6
Robbie Green	11
Terry Jenkins	6
Barrie Bates	11
Roland Scholten	5
Alex Roy	11
Ronnie Baxter	9
Denis Ovens	10
Alan Tabern	11
John Part	9
Andy Callaby	11

Quarter-finals; Best of 21 legs
Raymond van Barneveld 97.53	11
Phil Taylor 97.05	10
John MaGowan	11
Robbie Green	8
Barrie Bates	11
Alex Roy	10
Alan Tabern	11
Andy Callaby	5

Semi-finals; Best of 21 legs
Raymond van Barneveld 96.45	11
John MaGowan 86.22	7
Barrie Bates 82.80	11
Alan Tabern 85.17	9

Final; Best of 25 legs
Raymond van Barneveld 91.50	13
Barrie Bates 82.98	7

Random draws were made after each round up to the quarter final stage. Draw bracket has been compiled retrospectively.
