= 2000 Denmark Open darts =

Denmark Open

Tournament information
- Dates: 2000
- Country: Denmark
- Organisation(s): BDO, WDF, DDU

Champion(s)
- (England) Martin Adams

2000 Denmark Open is a darts tournament, which took place in Denmark in 2000.

== Results ==
Round	Player
Winner	(England) Martin Adams
Final	(England) Colin Monk
Semi-finals	(England) Steve Beaton
Semi-finals	(England) Ted Hankey
Quarter-finals	(England) Denis Ovens
Quarter-finals	(Scotland) Bob Taylor
Quarter-finals	(England) Paul Williams
Quarter-finals	(Sweden) Stefan Nagy
Last 16	(England) Wayne Mardle
Last 16	(England) Ronnie Baxter
Last 16	(Netherlands) Raymond van Barneveld
Last 16	(Sweden) Magnus Caris
Last 16	(England) Dave Askew
Last 16	(England) Les Fitton
Last 16	(Wales) Ritchie Davies
Last 16	(Finland) Marko Pusa
