= 2003 PDC World Darts Championship =

Tournament information
- Dates: 27 December 2002 – 5 January 2003
- Venue: Circus Tavern
- Location: Purfleet, Essex, England
- Organisation(s): Professional Darts Corporation
- Format: Sets; Final – best of 13
- Prize fund: £237,000
- Winner's share: £50,000
- High checkout: 170 Les Fitton (ENG) Roland Scholten (NED)

Champion(s)
- John Part (CAN)

The 2003 PDC World Darts Championship (known for sponsorship reasons as the 2003 Ladbrokes.com World Darts Championship) was the tenth World Championship organised by the Professional Darts Corporation since its split from the British Darts Organisation in 1993. The tournament took place between 27 December 2002 and 5 January 2003 at the Circus Tavern in Purfleet, England. Ladbrokes (who sponsored the 1996 event with their Vernon's brand) took over sponsorship of the event from Skol.

The field at the televised stages was expanded for the first time since 1999, adding an extra qualifying round that increased the total number of players from 32 to 40. John Part defeated the defending champion and number one seed, Phil Taylor, in the final. This ended Taylor's streak of eight successive World titles and 44 successive victories at the Circus Tavern.

This was Part's second world championship, having also won the 1994 BDO World Championship (the first tournament after the split). As Raymond van Barneveld won the rival BDO World Darts Championship the same year, this was the first time that both versions of the world title were held by a player from outside the British Isles.

== Qualifying criteria ==
The qualifying criteria for the World Championship were as follows:

- Top 32 of the PDC Order of Merit (as of 1 December 2002),
- Four PDPA Qualifiers (Al Hedman, Lee Palfreyman, Mark Robinson, Dave Smith),
- Australian Qualifier (Simon Whitlock),
- Dutch Qualifier (Arjan Moen),
- USA Qualifier (Ray Carver)
- Nine-dart challenge sponsored by The Sunday People (David Platt)

== Seeds ==
1. (England) Phil Taylor
2. (Canada) John Part
3. (England) Ronnie Baxter
4. (England) Alan Warriner
5. (Netherlands) Roland Scholten
6. (England) Peter Manley
7. (England) Colin Lloyd
8. (England) Dennis Smith
9. (England) Denis Ovens
10. (England) Andy Jenkins
11. (Wales) Richie Burnett
12. (England) Dave Askew
13. (England) John Lowe
14. (England) Kevin Painter
15. (Scotland) Jamie Harvey
16. (England) Peter Evison

== Prize money ==
Position (num. of players)		Prize money (Total: £237,000)
Winner	(1)	£50,000
Runner-Up	(1)	£25,000
Semi-finalists	(2)	£12,500
Quarter-finalists	(4)	£7,000
Third round losers	(8)	£5,000
Second round losers	(16)	£3,000
First round losers	(8)	£2,500
Highest finish bonus	(1)	£1,000

- Nine-dart finish: A diamond, worth a six figure sum, will be mounted in the bulls eye of a championship dartboard as a unique prize (not won).

== Results ==
=== First round ===
All matches are the best of 7 sets.

Av.	Player	Score	Player	Av.
80.11	Mark Holden (England)	4–3	(England) Dave Smith	81.65
83.11	Bob Anderson (England)	4–0	(Jamaica) Al Hedman	76.36
81.58	Reg Harding (England)	4–3	(England) Mark Robinson	83.67
86.75	Mick Manning (England)	4–2	(England) Lee Palfreyman	81.13
85.21	Simon Whitlock (Australia)	4–2	(England) Paul Williams	84.88
87.84	Steve Brown (United States)	4–2	(Australia) David Platt	88.05
92.99	Wayne Mardle (England)	4–0	(United States) Ray Carver	82.72
89.85	Shayne Burgess (England)	4–2	(Netherlands) Arjan Moen	84.07

=== Last 32 ===
Second round (best of 7 sets); 28–30 December
1	(England) Phil Taylor 103.44	4
(United States) Steve Brown 89.15	1
16	(England) Peter Evison 87.34	3
(England) Wayne Mardle 96.49	4
8	(England) Dennis Smith 92.96	4
(England) Dennis Priestley 84.46	1
9	(England) Denis Ovens 86.41	4
(England) Alex Roy 82.29	1
5	(Netherlands) Roland Scholten 84.68	4
(England) Shayne Burgess 81.84	1
12	(England) Dave Askew 85.22	4
(England) Steve Beaton 84.89	3
4	(England) Alan Warriner 85.54	4
(England) Rod Harrington 79.78	2
13	(England) John Lowe 72.49	1
(England) Les Fitton 80.90	4
2	(Canada) John Part 88.67	4
(England) Cliff Lazarenko 85.41	1
15	(Scotland) Jamie Harvey 85.07	4
(England) Mark Holden 83.26	1
7	(England) Colin Lloyd 86.36	4
(England) Bob Anderson 92.50	3
10	(England) Andy Jenkins 84.01	2
(England) Chris Mason 90.91	4
6	(England) Peter Manley 86.35	1
(Australia) Simon Whitlock 87.63	4
11	(Wales) Richie Burnett 91.69	4
(England) Keith Deller 87.92	3
3	(England) Ronnie Baxter 96.90	4
(England) Mick Manning 86.38	1
14	(England) Kevin Painter 86.49	4
(England) Reg Harding 86.43	1

Third round (best of 9 sets); 1–2 January
1	(England) Phil Taylor 98.71	5
(England) Wayne Mardle 93.70	3
8	(England) Dennis Smith 91.45	5
9	(England) Denis Ovens 93.44	1
5	(Netherlands) Roland Scholten 87.79	5
12	(England) Dave Askew 84.24	0
4	(England) Alan Warriner 88.76	5
(England) Les Fitton 87.94	4
2	(Canada) John Part 96.69	5
15	(Scotland) Jamie Harvey 92.58	3
7	(England) Colin Lloyd 92.82	1
(England) Chris Mason 96.78	5
(Australia) Simon Whitlock 87.68	3
11	(Wales) Richie Burnett 89.28	5
3	(England) Ronnie Baxter 87.94	3
14	(England) Kevin Painter 87.53	5

Quarter-finals (best of 9 sets); 3 January
1	(England) Phil Taylor 100.37	5
8	(England) Dennis Smith 94.46	3
5	(Netherlands) Roland Scholten 87.98	2
4	(England) Alan Warriner 90.87	5
2	(Canada) John Part 95.50	5
(England) Chris Mason 88.33	0
11	(Wales) Richie Burnett 83.58	2
14	(England) Kevin Painter 90.78	5

Semi-finals (best of 11 sets); 4 January
1	(England) Phil Taylor 95.60	6
4	(England) Alan Warriner 86.77	1
2	(Canada) John Part 93.20	6
14	(England) Kevin Painter 89.47	4

Final (best of 13 sets); 5 January
1	(England) Phil Taylor 99.98	6
2	(Canada) John Part 96.86	7

== Representation from different countries ==
This table shows the number of players by country in the World Championship, the total number including the 1st round.

	(England) ENG	(Netherlands) NED	(Australia) AUS	(Scotland) SCO	(Wales) WAL	(Canada) CAN	(United States) USA	(Jamaica) JAM	Total
Final	1	0	0	0	0	1	0	0	2
Semis	3	0	0	0	0	1	0	0	4
Quarters	5	1	0	0	1	1	0	0	8
Round 3	11	1	1	1	1	1	0	0	16
Round 2	26	1	1	1	1	1	1	0	32
Round 1	11	1	1	0	0	0	2	1	16
Total	30	2	2	1	1	1	2	1	40
