= Doddridge =

Doddridge may refer to:

- Doddridge (surname)
- Doddridge, Arkansas, United States
- Doddridge County, West Virginia, United States
