= Denis Ovens =

English darts player

Personal information
- Nickname: "The Heat"
- Born: 1 July 1957 (age 69) Enfield, England
- Home town: Stevenage, England

Sport
- Sport: Darts
- Playing since: 1976
- Darts: 20g LazerDarts
- Laterality: Right-handed
- Walk-on music: "The Heat Is On" by Glenn Frey

Organisation (see split in darts)
- BDO: 1984–2000
- PDC: 2000–2015

WDF major events – best performances
- World Championship: Last 32: 2000
- World Masters: Quarter-final: 1999
- World Trophy: First Round: 2007

PDC premier events – best performances
- World Championship: Quarter-final: 2005
- World Matchplay: Last 16: 2000, 2002, 2003, 2004, 2005, 2009, 2011
- World Grand Prix: Last 16: 2001, 2003, 2011
- UK Open: Semi-final: 2010, 2011, 2012
- Grand Slam: Last 16: 2008
- European Championship: Last 16: 2008
- Championship League: Semi-final: 2008
- Desert Classic: Quarter-final: 2002
- US Open/WSoD: Quarter-final: 2006
- PC Finals: Last 32: 2009, 2010, 2011

Other tournament wins
- Years
Claims Solutions Classic	2001
Ireland Open Autumn Classic	2007
Irish Masters	2001, 2002
Jersey Festival of Darts	2001
Open Holland	2003
PDC Eastbourne Open	2005
Scottish Open	1999
Players Championships
Players Championship	2010
UK Open Regionals/Qualifiers
UK Open Regional (Southern England)	2005

Denis Ovens (born 1 July 1957) is an English former professional darts player. He is nicknamed "The Heat" and is based in Stevenage.

== BDO ==
Ovens entered the British Darts Organisation (BDO) circuit in 1984, reaching the quarter-final stage at the Double Diamond Masters. He made his World Masters debut in 1986, reaching the last 16. He then reached the semi-finals of the Double Diamond Masters in 1987. Ovens began to rise up the rankings in 1999 after winning the Scottish Open and making the quarter-finals at the World Masters. He made his BDO World Darts Championship debut in 2000, losing to Bobby George in the first round. He switched to the PDC later that year.

== PDC ==
After switching to the PDC, Ovens made his PDC World Championship debut in 2001 Ovens made his PDC World Championship debut in 2001, but lost to Les Fitton in the first round. During the 2001 season, Ovens won the Irish Masters, Claims Solutions Classic and Jersey Darts Festival. Ovens was defeated by Richie Burnett defeated in the second round at the 2002 World Championship, but he won the Irish Masters again that year.

He qualified for the World Matchplay for 12 consecutive years from 2000 to 2011 and the World Grand Prix for 11 years in a row from 2001 to 2011.

Af the 2005 PDC World Darts Championship, he reached his only World Championship quarter-final before losing to former World Masters champion Mark Dudbridge. In 2007 he was beaten by Alan Tabern in a sudden death deciding leg, with Ovens narrowly missing a double 12 for a nine dart finish and a £15,000 bonus), in 2008.

Ovens was runner-up at the inaugural German Darts Championship in 2007, losing to Phil Taylor in the final but qualifying for the 2008 Grand Slam of Darts.

He reached the semi-final of the UK Open in three consecutive years from 2010 to 2012, where he was defeated by Phil Taylor (twice) and Wes Newton.

== World Championship results ==
=== BDO ===
- 2000: 1st Round (lost to Bobby George 1–3)

=== PDC ===
- 2001: 1st round (lost to Les Fitton 1–3)
- 2002: 2nd round (lost to Richie Burnett 4–6)
- 2003: 3rd round (lost to Dennis Smith 1–5)
- 2004: 3rd round (lost to Alex Roy 3–4)
- 2005: Quarter-finals (lost to Mark Dudbridge 3–5)
- 2006: 2nd round (lost to Steve Alker 1–4)
- 2007: 2nd round (lost to Alan Tabern 3–4)
- 2008: 2nd round (lost to Jan van der Rassel 1–4)
- 2009: 2nd round (lost to Ronnie Baxter 1–4)
- 2010: 2nd round (lost to Colin Lloyd 3–4)
- 2011: 2nd round (lost to Simon Whitlock 0–4)
- 2012: 1st round (retired due to injury while trailing Kevin Münch 1–0)
- 2013: 2nd round (lost to Adrian Lewis 1–4)

== Career statistics ==
Performance Table Legend
W	Won the tournament	F	Finalist	SF	Semifinalist	QF	Quarterfinalist	#R; RR; Prel.	Lost in # round Round-robin; Preliminary round	DQ	Disqualified
DNQ	Did not qualify	DNP	Did not participate	WD	Withdrew	NH	Tournament not held	#R; RR; Prel.	Lost in # round Round-robin; Preliminary round	NYF	Not yet founded

=== Performance timeline ===
==== BDO ====
Tournament	1986	1987	1988	1989	1994	1995	1997	1999	2000	2007
BDO World Championship	Did not participate								1R	PDC
World Masters	4R	DNP		2R	3R	1R	2R	QF	2R	PDC
British Professional	2R	1R	1R	Not held						
World Darts Trophy	Not held									1R
News of the World	DNP			1R	Not held		DNP	Not held		

==== PDC ====
Tournament	2000	2001	2002	2003	2004	2005	2006	2007	2008	2009	2010	2011		2012	2013
PDC World Championship	BDO	1R	2R	3R	3R	QF	2R	2R	2R	2R	2R	2R		1R	2R
UK Open	Not held			4R	5R	4R	5R	5R	3R	3R	SF	SF		SF	DNQ
World Matchplay	2R	1R	2R	2R	2R	2R	1R	1R	1R	2R	1R	2R		DNQ	
World Grand Prix	DNP	2R	1R	2R	1R	1R	1R	1R	1R	1R	1R	2R		DNQ	
European Championship	Not held								2R	DNQ	1R	DNQ			
Grand Slam	Not held							DNQ	2R	RR	DNQ				
Players Championship Finals	Not held									1R	1R	1R	1R	DNQ	
Las Vegas Desert Classic	Not held		QF	RR	2R	1R	1R	DNQ			Not held				
