= 2008 UK Open =

2008 Blue Square UK Open

Tournament information
- Dates: 5–8 June 2008
- Venue: Reebok Stadium
- Location: Bolton, England
- Organisation(s): Professional Darts Corporation (PDC)
- Format: Legs; Final – best of 21
- Prize fund: £178,000
- Winner's share: £35,000
- Nine-dart finish: Phil Taylor

Champion(s)
- James Wade

The 2008 Blue Square UK Open was the sixth year of the PDC's UK Open darts tournament where, following numerous regional qualifying heats throughout Britain, players competed in a single elimination tournament to be crowned champion. The tournament was held at Bolton Wanderers' Reebok Stadium, Bolton, England, between 5–8 June 2008.

James Wade won the tournament; it was his first UK Open title, and his third major title inside 12 months. He defeated American Gary Mawson in the final 11–7.

== Format ==
As in previous years, eight regional UK Open events were staged across the UK where players winning were collated into the UK Order Of Merit. The top 128 players in the list, who played a minimum of three events (plus ties) won a place at the final stages.

The final UK Open Order of Merit qualifiers (146) were also joined by 32 Holsten qualifiers from pub tournaments throughout the UK. The Holsten qualifiers and the players outside the top 32 of the UK Open Order of Merit began the tournament on the Thursday night. They played down to 32 players, and they were joined by the top 32 of the UK Open Order of Merit the following night, to provide the competition's last 64. A random draw was made after each subsequent round

== Prize money ==
| Stage (no. of players) | | Prize money (Total: £178,000) |
|---|---|---|
| Winner | (1) | £35,000 |
| Runner-Up | (1) | £15,000 |
| Semi-finalists | (2) | £10,000 |
| Quarter-finalists | (4) | £5,000 |
| Last 16 (fifth round) | (8) | £4,000 |
| Last 32 (fourth round) | (16) | £3,000 |
| Last 64 (third round) | (32) | £1,000 |
| Last 96 (second round) | (32) | n/a |
| Last 128 (first round) | (32) | n/a |
| Last 136 (preliminary round) | (8) | n/a |
| Nine-dart finish | (1) | £25,000 |

== Schedule ==
- Preliminary & First round (Thursday, best of 11 legs): Holsten pub qualifiers and those lowest in the UK Open Order of Merit start the tournament here.
- Second round (Thursday, best of 11 legs): The players just outside the top 32 in UK Open Order of Merit join preliminary and first round winners.
- Third round (Last 64) (Friday, best of 17 legs): Top 32 in UK Open Order of Merit join the 32 survivors from the first night's play.
- Fourth round (Last 32) (Saturday afternoon, best of 17 legs)
- Fifth round (Last 16) (Saturday evening, best of 17 legs)
- Quarter-finals (Sunday afternoon, best of 19 legs)
- Semi-finals (Sunday evening, best of 19 legs)
- Final (Sunday evening, best of 21 legs)

== 2007–2008 UK Open regional finals ==
There were eight regional final events staged between September 2007 and March 2008 to determine the UK Open Order of Merit Table. The tournament winners were:

23 September 2007 (Wales): James Wade 8-7 Raymond van Barneveld
7 October (Ireland): Raymond van Barneveld 8-2 Kevin McDine
21 October (Scotland): James Wade 8-2 Ronnie Baxter
13 January 2008 (North East): Colin Osborne 8-6 Denis Ovens
10 February (South West): Colin Lloyd 8-6 Andy Hamilton
2 March (South): Colin Lloyd 8-6 Phil Taylor
16 March (North West): Phil Taylor 8-7 Adrian Lewis
30 March (Midlands): Phil Taylor 8-0 Brendan Dolan

== Tournament review ==
The tournament has the nickname, the "FA Cup of darts" as a random draw is staged after each round. This provides no protection for the top players, who are usually seeded to avoid each other in early rounds. Raymond van Barneveld and Phil Taylor, the top two in the PDC rankings respectively, met at the quarter-final stage for the third successive year, with the Dutchman coming out on top each occasion, this time 10-9. In addition, Adrian Lewis and Wayne Mardle - two players who played in the 2008 Premier League - played as early as the third Round, the last 64 stage.

Van Barneveld, who had won the tournament for the previous two years went out in the semi-finals to Gary Mawson, which was the Dutchman's first loss at the Reebok Stadium in the event. It also meant that Phil Taylor now overtook him to regain the top spot in the PDC Order of Merit/world rankings, as van Barneveld had failed to defend the £30,000 from the UK Open two years ago.

Earlier in the tournament, Phil Taylor threw his fourth nine dart leg in six years in the UK Open, during a 9-1 victory over Jamie Harvey in the fourth round. In his Fifth round match against Wesley Newton, Taylor achieved the highest televised 3 dart average (to date) of 114.53 surpassing Darryl Fitton's record (114.15) in the International Darts League 2004 against Davy Richardson.

The semi-final line-up contained only one player from the United Kingdom for the first time it the tournament's six-year history. That one player - James Wade, however went on to claim to the title.

Gary Mawson was the first American player to reach the UK Open final, and the first American since Larry Butler in 1994 to reach a major PDC final.

== Results ==
=== Preliminary round ===
Best of 11 legs

- Johnny Haines 6 V 5 John Kuczynski
- Scott Waites 6 V 0 Scott Mitton
- Paul Whitworth 6 V 2 Mark Jodrill
- Nigel Birch 6 V 2 Paul Knighton
- Nicky Turner 6 V 3 Gordon Fitzpatrick
- Alan Casey 6 V 1 Alan Green
- Paul Cooper 6 V 2 Michael Barnard
- Chris Hornby 6 V 4 Steve Hillier

=== First round ===
Best of 11 legs

- Jamie Harvey 6 V 1 Richie Burnett
- Robert Thornton 6 V 5 Anastasia Dobromyslova
- Dennis Priestley 6 V 1 Danny King
- Dave Honey 6 V 1 Nicky Turner
- Mike Smith 6 V 3 Alan Caves
- Gary Mawson 6 V 5 Darren Johnson
- Dave Johnson 6 V 3 Stuart Pickles
- Ian Jopling 6 V 5 Ken Dobson
- Joey Palfreyman 6 V 1 Mel Davies
- Martin Burchell 6 V 3 Darren Sutton
- Dave Harris 6 V 3 Mick Savvery
- Alan Casey 6 V 4 Lee Palfreyman
- John Quantock 6 V 4 Gary Noonan
- Dan Timmins 6 V 0 Andrew Callary Snr
- Tony Ayres 6 V 3 David Howells
- Darren Webster 6 V 1 Chris Hornby
- Martyn Turner 6 V 5 Alan Reynolds
- Bob Crawley 6 V 1 Harry Anderson
- Adrian Welsh 6 V 5 David Woodwards
- Paul Whitworth 6 V 5 Dave Ladley
- Tony Mitchell 6 V 1 Geoff Harkup
- Johnny Haines Bye Darren Williams
- Scott Waites 6 V 3 Aaron Turner
- Shane Passey 6 V 3 Joe Bata
- Sean Palfrey 6 V 5 Jamie Robinson
- Lee White 6 V 5 Ryan Francis
- Nigel Birch 6 V 1 Dale Pinch
- Joe Cullen 6 V 0 Mark Stapleton
- Sam Rooney 6 V 1 Ritchie Corner
- Justin Pipe 6 V 4 Geoff Wylie
- Paul Cooper 6 V 4 Kevin McDine

=== Second round ===
Best of 11 legs

- Terry Jenkins 6 V 0 Joey Palfreyman
- Wayne Mardle 6 V 3 Gary Welding
- Kevin Painter 6 V 2 Tony Eccles
- Matt Clark 6 V 4 Steve Beaton
- Kirk Shepherd 6 V 4 Jan van der Rassel
- Robert Thornton 6 V 2 Bob Crawley
- Joe Cullen 6 V 3 Dennis Smith
- Paul Cooper 6 V 1 Carlos Rodriguez
- John Magowan Bye Jimmy Mann
- Dave Askew 6 V 4 Steve Hine
- Nigel Birch 6 V 5 Shane Passey
- Andy Jenkins 6 V 1 Mike Smith
- Gary Mawson 6 V 0 Mark Frost
- Dave Honey 6 V 2 Kevin Dowling
- Dennis Priestley 6 V 4 Mick McGowan
- Steve Evans 6 V 4 Owen Caffrey
- David Platt 6 V 4 Martin Burchell
- Tony Ayres 6 V 5 Paul Whitworth
- Jason Clark 6 V 0 Johnny Haines
- Steve Smith 6 V 4 Jamie Caven
- Martyn Turner 6 V 1 John Quantock
- Scott Waites 6 V 0 Lee White
- Steve Maish 6 V 1 Ian Jopling
- Alan Warriner-Little 6 V 2 Tony Mitchell
- Jason Barry 6 V 5 Adrian Welsh
- Mark Lawrence 6 V 5 Darren Webster
- Justin Pipe 6 V 2 Lionel Sams
- John Ferrell 6 V 3 Dan Timmins
- Simon Whatley 6 V 2 Sean Palfrey
- Jamie Harvey 6 V 4 Dave Harris
- Alan Casey 6 V 2 Dave Johnson

=== Third round ===
Best of 17 legs

Main Stage

- (Netherlands) M van Gerwen 7-9 R Thornton (Scotland)
- (Netherlands) V van der Voort 9-4 C Lloyd (England)
- (England) J Ferrell 3-9 P Taylor (England)
- (England) A Lewis 9-8 W Mardle (England)
- (Canada) J Part 9-2 C Monk (England)

Board Two

- (England) M King 8-9 W Newton (England)
- (England) T Ayres 0-9 R van Barneveld (Netherlands)
- (England) K Painter 3-9 C Osborne (England)
- (England) J Wade 9-3 J Pipe (England)
- (England) A Smith 1-9 T Jenkins (England)

Board Three

- (England) K Shepherd 8-9 W Jones (England)
- (England) P Cooper 7-9 A Tabern (England)
- (Netherlands) J Klaasen 9-6 D Askew (England)
- (England) M Turner 6-9 J Harvey (Scotland)

Board Four

- (England) M Dudbridge 9-8 A Warriner-Little (England)
- (Wales) B Bates 9-4 J Clark (Scotland)
- (England) P Manley 9-3 D Honey (England)
- (Wales) S Evans 8-9 S Whatley (England)

Board Five

- (England) N Birch 9-8 D Priestley (England)
- (England) M Walsh 9-4 R Scholten (Netherlands)
- (England) A Casey 2-9 J Barry (Republic of Ireland)

Board Six

- (England) S Brown 9-5 K McDine (England)
- (England) M Clark 2-9 A Hamilton (England)
- (England) S Smith 9-7 A Jenkins (England)

Board Seven

- (England) S Waites 9-4 W Atwood (Wales)
- (United States) G Mawson 9-7 A Roy (England)
- (England) D Platt 4-9 M Lawrence (England)
- (England) R Baxter 9-1 S Rooney (England)

Board Eight

- (Northern Ireland) J MaGowan 5-9 B Dolan (Northern Ireland)
- (England) S Maish 9-6 D Ovens (England)
- (England) C Mason 9-5 J Cullen (England)
- (England) C Thompson 9-4 A Gray (England)

=== Fourth round ===
Best of 17 legs,

Main Stage

- (Scotland) J Harvey 1-9 P Taylor (England) *Phil Taylor hit nine-darter*
- (England) R Baxter 9-6 S Waites (England)
- (Republic of Ireland) J Barry 7-9 R van Barneveld (Netherlands)
- (England) P Manley 7-9 M Dudbridge (England)
- (England) C Osborne 8-9 V van der Voort (Netherlands)

Board Two

- (England) T Jenkins 6-9 J Part (Canada)
- (England) J Wade 9-5 S Brown (England)
- (England) A Hamilton 9-6 C Mason (England)
- (Netherlands) J Klaasen 9-3 N Birch (England)

Board Three

- (England) A Tabern 9-6 R Thornton (Scotland)
- (England) W Newton 9-7 M Walsh (England)
- (England) M Lawrence 4-9 G Mawson (United States)

Board Four

- (England) W Jones 9-2 B Bates (Wales)
- (England) A Lewis 8-9 B Dolan (Northern Ireland)
- (England) S Maish 5-9 C Thompson (England)
- (England) S Smith 6-9 S Whatley (England)

=== Final Stages ===
5th round
(England) James Wade 96.72 | 9
(England) Ronnie Baxter 83.72 | 2
(England) Alan Tabern | 9
(England) Simon Whatley | 8
(Netherlands) Vincent van der Voort 95.34 | 9
(Netherlands) Jelle Klaasen 93.50 | 6
(England) Chris Thompson | 9
(Northern Ireland) Brendan Dolan | 2
(England) Wes Newton 97.32 | 3
(England) Phil Taylor 114.53 | 9
(England) Andy Hamilton 98.43 | 4
(Netherlands) Raymond van Barneveld 100.41 | 9
(Canada) John Part | 6
(England) Wayne Jones | 9
(England) Mark Dudbridge | 8
(United States) Gary Mawson | 9

Quarter-finals
(England) Wade 91.72 | 10
(England) Tabern 92.80 | 6
(Netherlands) v d Voort 93.59 | 10
(England) Thompson 92.21 | 5
(England) Taylor 101.38 | 9
(Netherlands) v Barneveld 97.72 | 10
(England) Jones 87.93 | 6
(United States) Mawson 87.14 | 10

Semi-finals
(England) Wade 101.39 | 10
(Netherlands) v d Voort 93.20 | 4
(Netherlands) Barneveld 92.15 | 8
(United States) Mawson 90.66 | 10

Final
(England) James Wade 94.65 | 11
(United States) Gary Mawson 87.33 | 7

Random draws were made after each round up to the semi-final stage. Draw bracket has been compiled retrospectively.
