= 2002 World Grand Prix (darts) =

2002 Paddy Power World Grand Prix

Tournament information
- Dates: 22–27 October 2002
- Venue: Citywest Hotel
- Location: Dublin, Ireland
- Organisation(s): Professional Darts Corporation (PDC)
- Format: Sets "double in, double out"
- Prize fund: £70,000
- Winner's share: £14,000
- High checkout: 153 Phil Taylor

Champion(s)
- Phil Taylor (ENG)

The 2002 Paddy Power World Grand Prix was the fifth staging of the World Grand Prix darts tournament, organised by the Professional Darts Corporation. It was held at the Citywest Hotel in Dublin, Ireland, from 22 to 27 October 2002.

Defending champion Alan Warriner lost in the first round to Ritchie Buckle. Phil Taylor defeated John Part 7–3 in the final to win his fourth Grand Prix title.

== Prize money ==
| Position (num. of players) | | Prize money (Total: £70,000) |
|---|---|---|
| Winner | (1) | £14,000 |
| Runner-Up | (1) | £7,000 |
| Semi-finalists | (2) | £4,000 |
| Quarter-finalists | (4) | £2,250 |
| Second round losers | (8) | £1,500 |
| First round losers | (16) | £1,250 |

== Seeds ==
There were eight seeds for the competition.

1. (England) Phil Taylor
2. (Canada) John Part
3. (England) Alan Warriner
4. (England) Ronnie Baxter
5. (England) Denis Ovens
6. (Netherlands) Roland Scholten
7. (England) Colin Lloyd
8. (England) Peter Manley

== Results ==
Players in bold denote match winners.

**First round** (best of 3 sets); 22–23 October
1 | (England) **Phil Taylor** | **2**
(England) Keith Deller | 0
(England) Cliff Lazarenko | 1
(Republic of Ireland) **Jack McKenna** | **2**
8 | (England) Peter Manley | 0
(England) **Mark Holden** | **2**
(Northern Ireland) Paul Dillon | 0
(England) **Rod Harrington** | **2**
5 | (England) Denis Ovens | 1
(England) **Dave Smith** | **2**
(England) **Peter Evison** | **2**
(England) Les Fitton | 0
4 | (England) **Ronnie Baxter** | **2**
(Wales) Richie Burnett | 0
(England) Dennis Priestley | 0
(England) **Kevin Painter** | **2**
2 | (Canada) **John Part** | **2**
(England) Steve Beaton | 0
(England) John Lowe | 1
(England) **Chris Mason** | **2**
7 | (England) **Colin Lloyd** | **2**
(Scotland) Jamie Harvey | 0
(England) **Dennis Smith** | **2**
(England) Wayne Jones | 0
6 | (Netherlands) **Roland Scholten** | **2**
(England) Dave Askew | 0
(England) Mark Robinson | 1
(England) **Alex Roy** | **2**
3 | (England) Alan Warriner | 1
(England) **Ritchie Buckle** | **2**
(Scotland) Hugh Allison | 0
(England) **Andy Jenkins** | **2**

**Second round** (best of 3 sets); 24 October
1 | (England) **Phil Taylor** | **2**
(Republic of Ireland) Jack McKenna | 0
(England) **Mark Holden** | **2**
(England) Rod Harrington | 0
(England) Dave Smith | 0
(England) **Peter Evison** | **2**
4 | (England) **Ronnie Baxter** | **2**
(England) Kevin Painter | 0
2 | (Canada) **John Part** | **2**
(England) Chris Mason | 0
7 | (England) Colin Lloyd | 0
(England) **Dennis Smith** | **2**
6 | (Netherlands) **Roland Scholten** | **2**
(England) Alex Roy | 1
(England) Ritchie Buckle | 0
(England) **Andy Jenkins** | **2**

**Quarter-finals** (best of 7 sets); 25 October
1 | (England) **Phil Taylor** | **4**
(England) Mark Holden | 0
(England) **Peter Evison** | **4**
(England) Ronnie Baxter | 2
2 | (Canada) **John Part** | **4**
(England) Dennis Smith | 1
6 | (Netherlands) Roland Scholten | 0
(England) **Andy Jenkins** | **4**

**Semi-finals** (best of 11 sets); 26 October
1 | (England) **Phil Taylor** | **6**
(England) Peter Evison | 0
2 | (Canada) **John Part** | **6**
(England) Andy Jenkins | 1

**Final** (best of 13 sets); 27 October
1 | (England) **Phil Taylor** | **7**
2 | (Canada) John Part | 3
