= Dodderidge =

Dodderidge is an English surname. Notable people with the surname include:

- Daisy Dodderidge, fictional character of Harry Potter
- John Dodderidge (1610–1659), English lawyer and politician
- Pentecost Dodderidge (died c. 1650), English politician

== See also ==
- Doddridge (surname)
