= Frank Dudbridge =

Statistical geneticist

- Education: King's College London; Imperial College London
- Scientific career
- Fields: Genetic epidemiology; Statistical genetics
- Institutions: University of Cambridge; London School of Hygiene and Tropical Medicine; University of Leicester
- Thesis: Image Approximation by Self Affine Fractals (1992)
- Academic advisors: John Todd

Frank Dudbridge is Professor of Statistical Genetics in the Department of Health Sciences at the University of Leicester, where he has worked since 2016. His research focuses on the fields of statistical genetics and genetic epidemiology as they relate to common human diseases. Before joining the University of Leicester, he served first as a senior statistician at the MRC Biostatistics Unit at the University of Cambridge, then as Reader and Professor of Statistical Genetics at the London School of Hygiene and Tropical Medicine.
