= Mark Dudbridge =

English darts player (born 1973)

Personal information
- Nickname: Flash
- Born: 11 January 1973 (age 53) Bristol, England

Sport
- Sport: Darts
- Playing since: 1986
- Darts: 21g Harrows Flash Series
- Laterality: Right-handed
- Walk-on music: "Flash" by Queen

Organisation (see split in darts)
- BDO: 2002
- PDC: 2002– (Tour Card: 2011–2015, 2018-2019)

WDF major events – best performances
- World Masters: Winner (1): 2002
- Int. Darts League: Last 16 Group: 2007

PDC premier events – best performances
- World Championship: Runner-up: 2005
- World Matchplay: Runner-up: 2004
- World Grand Prix: Quarter-final: 2005, 2007
- UK Open: Last 16: 2007, 2008
- Premier League: 5th: 2005
- Championship League: Winners group, 6th: 2008
- Desert Classic: Last 16: 2007
- US Open/WSoD: Quarter-final: 2007
- PC Finals: Last 32: 2009, 2010, 2011

WSDT major events – best performances
- World Championship: Quarter-final: 2023, 2024

Other tournament wins
- Years
Ireland Open Autumn Classic	2003
Southern Counties Open	2014
PDC Challenge Tour	2017 (x2)
LP Metal Detecting Series 4	2023
JDB Butlin's Cup	2024
Players Championships
2004
UK Open Regionals
Regional Finals	2003, 2006

Mark Dudbridge (born 11 January 1973) is an English professional darts player who competes in Professional Darts Corporation (PDC) and senior darts events. Nicknamed "Flash", he won the 2002 World Masters before reaching the final of the 2004 World Matchplay and the 2005 PDC World Darts Championship, losing both to Phil Taylor. He also competed in the inaugural 2005 Premier League Darts and won two PDC Challenge Tour titles in 2017. Later in his career, Dudbridge reached the quarter-finals of the World Seniors Darts Championship in both 2023 and 2024.

== Career ==
=== BDO career and switch to the PDC ===
Dudbridge began playing darts in 1986, during his early teens, and cited Dennis Priestley as one of his early influences. His breakthrough came in November 2002, when he unexpectedly won the Winmau World Masters in Bridlington, his first televised major tournament. He defeated defending champion Raymond van Barneveld in the opening round and went on to beat Tony West 7–4 in the final to secure the title.

Following his World Masters victory, Dudbridge decided to switch from the British Darts Organisation (BDO) to the Professional Darts Corporation (PDC). As a result, he never competed at the BDO World Darts Championship. He quickly established himself on the PDC circuit, winning a UK Open regional qualifier and the Ireland Open Autumn Classic in 2003.

=== PDC career ===
==== 2004–2005: World Matchplay and World Championship finals ====
Dudbridge made his PDC World Darts Championship debut at the 2004 PDC World Darts Championship, where he defeated defending champion John Part on his way to the quarter-finals. His run ended with a 5–1 defeat to Kevin Painter.

In July 2004, Dudbridge achieved his first appearance in a PDC televised major final at the 2004 World Matchplay in Blackpool. He defeated Peter Manley 16–9 in the quarter-finals and Ronnie Baxter 17–13 in the semi-finals before losing the final 18–8 to Phil Taylor. Later that year, he also claimed his first Players Championship title in Edinburgh, defeating Manley 3–1 in the final.

At the 2005 PDC World Darts Championship, Dudbridge produced the best World Championship performance of his career. He defeated two former world champions, Richie Burnett and John Part, in his opening matches, before overcoming Denis Ovens 5–3 in the quarter-finals and Wayne Mardle 6–4 in the semi-finals. In the final, he faced Taylor for the second time in a major final within six months. Dudbridge won four sets but was eventually defeated 7–4.

His performances earned him an invitation to the inaugural 2005 Premier League Darts. Competing against six other leading PDC players, Dudbridge recorded three wins, two draws and seven defeats, finishing fifth in the league table and narrowly missing out on the play-offs. His rapid rise also prompted him to become a full-time professional darts player.

==== 2006–2010: Established PDC professional ====
Dudbridge remained a regular competitor on the PDC circuit over the following seasons. He reached the third round of the 2006 PDC World Darts Championship, losing 4–1 to Kevin Painter, and won another UK Open regional qualifier in 2006. At the 2007 PDC World Darts Championship, he was eliminated in the second round by Andy Hamilton following a deciding-set defeat.

In 2007, Dudbridge reached the last 16 of the UK Open and the quarter-finals of the inaugural US Open. He also made the quarter-finals of the World Grand Prix, winning a deciding leg against Andy Jenkins in the second round despite missing nine darts at a starting double. His run ended with a 4–1 defeat to Terry Jenkins. It was his second World Grand Prix quarter-final, having previously reached the same stage in 2005.

At the 2008 PDC World Darts Championship, Dudbridge reached the third round before losing 4–2 to James Wade. He also reached the last 16 of the 2008 UK Open and qualified for the inaugural 2008 Championship League Darts. In that event, Dudbridge won the seventh qualifying group, defeating Adrian Lewis 7–4 in the group final. He subsequently finished sixth in the eight-player Winners Group, missing out on the semi-finals.

Dudbridge continued to qualify for major PDC events, reaching the third round of the World Championship in both 2009 and 2010. He lost 4–0 to Barrie Bates at the 2009 PDC World Darts Championship and 4–2 to Co Stompé at the 2010 PDC World Darts Championship. He also appeared at the Players Championship Finals in 2009 and 2010, but was eliminated in the opening round on both occasions.

==== 2011–2015: Declining results ====
Dudbridge began the following decade with a second-round appearance at the 2011 PDC World Darts Championship, where he lost 4–1 to eventual champion Adrian Lewis. At the 2012 PDC World Darts Championship, he suffered a 3–0 opening-round defeat to Dave Chisnall, beginning a prolonged period without significant success at televised major events.

Despite his declining results, Dudbridge continued to compete on the PDC Pro Tour. In July 2012, he reached the last 16 of the 2012 European Darts Open in Düsseldorf, defeating Co Stompé and Wes Newton before losing 6–2 to Chisnall.

Dudbridge qualified for the 2013 UK Open, his first televised major appearance since the 2012 World Championship, but was eliminated in the opening round. He also returned to the World Championship at the 2014 PDC World Darts Championship, where he was defeated 3–0 by Gary Anderson in the first round. The result marked his final appearance at the PDC World Championship.

His results continued to deteriorate during the 2014 and 2015 seasons. Although he won the Southern Counties Open in 2014 and continued to qualify for occasional European Tour events, he was unable to maintain his position among the leading PDC players. At the 2015 European Darts Trophy, Dudbridge lost 6–5 to Darren Johnson in the first round. He subsequently lost his PDC Tour Card and entered Qualifying School in 2016.

==== 2016–2017: Challenge Tour success and return to the PDC ====
After failing to regain his Tour Card at the 2016 PDC Qualifying School, Dudbridge competed on the PDC Challenge Tour. He reached three finals during the season, losing to Ritchie Edhouse in Event 3, Ryan Searle in Event 7 and Rob Cross in Event 10. Dudbridge finished sixth in the final Challenge Tour Order of Merit with £3,950 in prize money, but did not earn an automatic Tour Card.

Dudbridge enjoyed greater success in 2017, winning two Challenge Tour events. On 16 April, he defeated Alan Tabern 5–2 in the final of Event 7 in Barnsley. He claimed his second title on 11 June, beating Kevin Edwards 5–4 in the final of Event 15 in Milton Keynes. He also reached another final and several other latter stages during the campaign.

His consistency saw him finish second on the 2017 Challenge Tour Order of Merit with £6,500, behind Wayne Jones, who won £10,300. Both players received two-year PDC Tour Cards for the 2018 and 2019 seasons, allowing Dudbridge to return to the professional circuit after two years away.

==== 2018–2019: Return to the Pro Tour ====
Dudbridge resumed competing as a PDC Tour Card holder in 2018. He qualified for the 2018 Gibraltar Darts Trophy, although he lost in the first round. Despite his return to the professional circuit, he was unable to qualify for the World Championship or other major televised events during the season.

In 2019, Dudbridge reached the third round of the 2019 UK Open, where he narrowly lost 6–5 to William O'Connor. Later that month, he qualified for the 2019 German Darts Championship in Hildesheim. He defeated Gabriel Clemens 6–4 in the opening round before losing 6–2 to Gerwyn Price in the second round.

Dudbridge failed to retain his Tour Card at the end of the 2019 season, bringing another period as a full-time PDC professional to an end.

=== Senior darts and later career ===
==== 2023: World Seniors debut ====
Following a period of reduced competitive activity, Dudbridge returned to televised darts at the 2023 World Seniors Darts Championship. His earlier decline had been partly affected by recurring shoulder problems, which required multiple operations and disrupted his throwing action. Speaking after the tournament, Dudbridge said that his return to televised competition had renewed his enthusiasm for the sport.

At the tournament, Dudbridge defeated former Premier League champion Glen Durrant 3–0 in the opening round and Terry Jenkins 3–1 in the second round. He then faced his former rival Kevin Painter in the quarter-finals. Despite winning the opening set, Dudbridge eventually lost 3–1, ending his first appearance at the event in the last eight.

Later that year, Dudbridge competed at the 2023 World Seniors Darts Masters, where he lost 4–2 to eventual champion Leonard Gates in the opening round.

==== 2024: Second World Seniors quarter-final ====
Dudbridge returned to the 2024 World Seniors Darts Championship at the Circus Tavern in February 2024. He again defeated Glen Durrant in the first round, this time winning a five-set contest 3–2. In the second round, he recovered from a 2–1 deficit against Richie Howson to win 3–2 in a deciding set that required additional legs. His tournament ended in the quarter-finals with a 3–1 defeat to Colin McGarry.

==== 2025–2026: Continued participation ====
Dudbridge competed at the 2025 World Seniors Darts Championship, but was eliminated in the first round by Chris Mason, losing 3–1.

In an interview published in June 2025, Dudbridge reflected on his earlier retirement from regular competition and his return through senior darts and the MODUS Super Series. He acknowledged that he remained highly competitive but had found it difficult to maintain the level of practice required to return to his former standard. He also stated that his renewed involvement in televised events had helped restore his interest in competitive darts.

Dudbridge remained active in 2026, making appearances on the PDC Challenge Tour and the MODUS Super Series. In August, he competed in the opening week of the fifteenth MODUS Super Series, finishing fourth in Group B behind Matt Clark, James Buckby and Jonny Barnes.

== Outside darts ==
Dudbridge is a supporter of Bristol City F.C. and has been involved in darts-related businesses in the Bristol area. Together with fellow professional darts player Steve Brown, he has helped run Cafe 501, a sports bar in Staple Hill, Bristol, featuring several darts boards and facilities for local players.

He was also one of the professional players featured in the PDC World Championship Darts video game series.

== World Championship results ==
=== PDC ===
- 2004: Quarter-finals (lost to Kevin Painter 1–5)
- 2005: Runner-up (lost to Phil Taylor 4–7)
- 2006: Third round (lost to Kevin Painter 1–4)
- 2007: Second round (lost to Andy Hamilton 3–4)
- 2008: Third round (lost to James Wade 2–4)
- 2009: Third round (lost to Barrie Bates 0–4)
- 2010: Third round (lost to Co Stompé 2–4)
- 2011: Second round (lost to Adrian Lewis 1–4)
- 2012: First round (lost to Dave Chisnall 0–3)
- 2014: First round (lost to Gary Anderson 0–3)

=== WSDT ===
- 2023: Quarter-finals (lost to Kevin Painter 1–3)
- 2024: Quarter-finals (lost to Colin McGarry 1–3)
- 2025: First round (lost to Chris Mason 1–3)

== Career finals ==
=== BDO major finals: 1 (1 title) ===
Outcome	No.	Year	Championship	Opponent in the final	Score	Ref.
Winner	1.	2002	Winmau World Masters	(England) Tony West	7–4 (s)	

=== PDC premier event finals: 2 (2 runners-up) ===
Legend
World Matchplay (0–1)
World Championship (0–1)

Outcome	No.	Year	Championship	Opponent in the final	Score
Runner-up	1.	2004	World Matchplay	Phil Taylor	8–18 (l)
Runner-up	2.	2005	World Darts Championship	Phil Taylor	4–7 (s)

== Performance timeline ==
=== BDO ===
Tournament	2002	2003	2004	2005	2006	2007
World Masters	W	Did not participate				
International Darts League	NH	Did not participate				RR

=== WSDT ===
Tournament	2022	2023	2024	2025
World Seniors Championship	DNP	QF	QF	1R
World Seniors Masters	DNP	1R	DNP	NH

=== PDC ===
Tournament	2002	2003	2004	2005	2006	2007	2008	2009	2010	2011		2012	2013	2014	2015	2016	2017	2018	2019
PDC Ranked televised events
World Championship	DNQ		QF	F	3R	2R	3R	3R	3R	2R		1R	DNQ	1R	Did not qualify				
UK Open	NH	3R	3R	4R	3R	6R	5R	4R	3R	4R		DNQ	1R	DNQ	1R	2R	DNQ		3R
World Matchplay	DNQ	2R	F	2R	1R	1R	1R	1R	1R	Did not qualify									
World Grand Prix	DNQ	1R	1R	QF	1R	QF	1R	2R	1R	Did not qualify									
European Championship	Not held						DNQ		1R	Did not qualify						DNP		DNQ	
Players Championship Finals	Not held							1R	1R	1R	DNQ	Did not qualify				DNP		DNQ	
PDC Non-ranked televised events
Premier League Darts	Not held			5th	Did not participate						Did not participate								
Championship League Darts	Not held						RR	RR	RR	RR		DNQ		Not held					
Past major events
Las Vegas Desert Classic	DNQ		1R	1R	1R	2R	DNQ		Not held										
World Series of Darts	Not held				QF	Not held													
US Open	Not held					QF	QF	Not held											
Career statistics
Year-end ranking	–	13	10	14	17	18	20	21	28	32		49	61	58	63	168	–	147	114

==== PDC European Tour ====
Season	1	2	3	4	5	6	7	8	9	10	11	12	13
2012	ADO; 2R	DNQ	EDO; 3R	GDM; 1R	DNQ								
2013	Did not qualify					GDC; 2R	DNQ	DDM; 1R					
2014	GDC; 1R	Did not qualify				EDO; 2R	DNQ						
2015	Did not qualify						EDT; 1R	DNQ					
2018	Did not qualify						GDT; 1R	Did not qualify					
2019	DNQ	GDC; 2R	Did not qualify										

==== PDC Players Championships ====
Season	1	2	3	4	5	6	7	8	9	10	11	12	13	14	15	16	17	18	19	20	21	22	23	24	25	26	27	28	29	30	31	32	33	34	35	36	37
2003	BLA; 4R																																				
2004	DNP		DUB; QF	ROT; 4R	EDI; W																																
2005	IOW; 2R	IOW; 4R	BLA; QF	NEW; 2R	DUB; 3R	IRV; 2R	LIS; 1R	LIS; SF																													
2006	DNP	HAY; 2R	HAY; QF	BLA; 2R	NEW; 1R	DUB; 3R	IRV; 3R	LIS; 4R	LIS; QF																												
2007	GIB; 4R	GIB; 3R	DNP	TEM; 2R	DNP		HAY; SF	HAY; QF	LVE; 4R	DNP		CAS; 4R	CHI; 4R	NEW; 3R	DUB; 4R	IRV; 4R	KIR; 2R	KIL; 3R	LIS; 3R	LIS; 1R																	
2008	GIB; 4R	GIB; 4R	BRE; 1R	WIG; 1R	BAD; 1R	BAD; 3R	TEL; 3R	TEM; QF	GLA; F	SCH; 3R	BRI; 3R	BRI; 3R	LVE; 3R	BLA; 3R	DNP			VEL; 1R	VEL; 3R	DRO; 3R	DNP	NEW; 4R	NEW; 4R	DUB; 2R	DUB; 3R	IRV; 3R	IRV; 3R	DIN; SF	KIL; 4R	LEI; 4R	LEI; 3R						
2009	DON; F	GIB; SF	GIB; F	DNP	GLA; 2R	IRV; 1R	DNP	BRE; 2R	COV; 3R	DNP		TAU; 2R	DER; 4R	NEW; 4R	DNP	BAR; 2R	DIN; 2R	DIN; 4R	LVE; 4R	DNP			SAL; 1R	SAL; 3R	DNP	DUB; 2R	KIL; QF	DNP	NUL; 2R	IRV; 3R	IRV; 4R						
2010	GIB; QF	GIB; 4R	SWI; 3R	DNP	GLA; QF	GLA; 3R	WIG; F	CRA; QF	BAR; 4R	DER; 4R	DNP	WIG; 2R	SAL; QF	SAL; 4R	BAR; 2R	BAR; 3R	DNP	HAA; 1R	LVE; 1R	LVE; 3R	LVE; 2R	DNP			CRA; QF	CRA; 3R	NUL; 3R	NUL; 4R	DUB; 2R	DUB; 2R	DNP			BAR; 2R	BAR; 3R	DER; 3R	DER; 4R
2011	HAL; 3R	HAL; 2R	DER; 3R	DER; 2R	CRA; 3R	CRA; 2R	VIE; 3R	VIE; 2R	CRA; 1R	CRA; 2R	BAR; 1R	BAR; 1R	NUL; 1R	NUL; 2R	ONT; 1R	ONT; 3R	DER; 4R	DER; 2R	NUL; 4R	NUL; 2R	DUB; 1R	DUB; 2R	DNP	GLA; 1R	GLA; 1R	ALI; 2R	ALI; 1R	CRA; 1R	CRA; 1R	WIG; 1R	WIG; 1R						
2012	ALI; 2R	ALI; 1R	REA; 1R	REA; 1R	CRA; 2R	CRA; 1R	BIR; 1R	BIR; 2R	CRA; 1R	CRA; 1R	BAR; 2R	BAR; 1R	DUB; 1R	DUB; 2R	Did not participate																						
2013	WIG; 1R	WIG; 1R	WIG; 1R	WIG; 1R	CRA; 1R	CRA; 2R	BAR; 4R	BAR; 1R	DUB; SF	DUB; 4R	KIL; 1R	KIL; 2R	WIG; 1R	WIG; 1R	BAR; SF	BAR; 4R																					
2014	BAR; 4R	BAR; 1R	CRA; 2R	CRA; 1R	WIG; 1R	WIG; 1R	WIG; 1R	WIG; 1R	CRA; 2R	CRA; 2R	COV; 1R	COV; 2R	CRA; 1R	CRA; 1R	DUB; 2R	DUB; 2R	CRA; 1R	CRA; 3R	COV; 1R	COV; 1R																	
2015	BAR; 2R	BAR; 4R	BAR; 2R	BAR; 2R	BAR; 1R	COV; 2R	COV; 3R	COV; 1R	CRA; 1R	CRA; 1R	BAR; 3R	BAR; 3R	WIG; 2R	WIG; 2R	BAR; 1R	BAR; 2R	DUB; 1R	DUB; 1R	COV; 1R	COV; 1R																	
2018	BAR; 1R	BAR; 2R	BAR; 1R	BAR; 1R	MIL; 2R	MIL; 2R	BAR; 1R	BAR; 1R	WIG; 1R	WIG; 1R	MIL; 1R	MIL; 1R	WIG; 1R	WIG; 1R	BAR; 1R	BAR; 1R	BAR; 1R	BAR; 1R	DUB; 1R	DUB; 2R	BAR; 1R	BAR; 1R															
2019	WIG; 4R	WIG; 1R	WIG; 3R	WIG; 1R	BAR; 1R	BAR; 2R	WIG; 1R	WIG; 1R	BAR; 2R	BAR; 1R	BAR; 3R	BAR; 1R	BAR; 1R	BAR; 1R	BAR; 1R	BAR; 1R	WIG; 1R	WIG; 2R	BAR; 2R	BAR; 2R	DNP		BAR; 2R	BAR; 1R	BAR; 1R	BAR; 1R	DUB; 1R	DUB; 1R	BAR; 2R	BAR; 2R							

==== PDC Challenge Tour ====
Season	1	2	3	4	5	6	7	8	9	10	11	12	13	14	15	16	17	18	19	20	21	22	23	24	Prize money	Ranking
2016	WIG; L256	WIG; L64	WIG; F	WIG; L256	WIG; L16	WIG; L64	WIG; F	WIG; L64	MIL; L128	MIL; F	MIL; L128	MIL; L16	WIG; L16	WIG; L32	WIG; L32	WIG; L128									£3,950	6th
2017	MIL; L128	MIL; L256	MIL; L128	MIL; L16	BAR; L64	BAR; L32	BAR; W	BAR; L128	MIL; SF	MIL; L128	MIL; L256	MIL; L32	MIL; F	MIL; L128	MIL; W	MIL; L32	WIG; L64	WIG; QF	WIG; L128	WIG; L32					£6,500	2nd
2025	MIL; L128	MIL; L256	MIL; L128	MIL; L256	MIL; L128	Did not participate																			£0	NC
2026	MIL; L512	MIL; L128	MIL; L128	MIL; L512	MIL; L512	LEI; L128	LEI; L128	LEI; L256	LEI; L256	LEI; L256	Did not participate														£0	NC

Performance Table Legend
W	Won the tournament	F	Finalist	SF	Semifinalist	QF	Quarterfinalist	#R; RR; Prel.	Lost in # round Round-robin; Preliminary round	DQ	Disqualified
DNQ	Did not qualify	DNP	Did not participate	WD	Withdrew	NH	Tournament not held	#R; RR; Prel.	Lost in # round Round-robin; Preliminary round	NYF	Not yet founded
