= Dave Smith (darts player) =

English darts player

Personal information
- Nickname: "The Rhino"
- Born: 17 June 1971 (age 55) Pontefract, Yorkshire, England
- Home town: Knottingley, Wakefield, West Yorkshire, England

Sport
- Sport: Darts
- Playing since: 1984
- Darts: 22 Gram Alan Glazier
- Laterality: Right-handed
- Walk-on music: "Let's Get Rocked" by Def Leppard

Organisation (see split in darts)
- BDO: 2013–2015, 2019–2020
- PDC: 2001–2012
- Current world ranking: (WDF) NR (17 August 2026)

WDF major events – best performances
- World Masters: Last 144: 2014

PDC premier events – best performances
- World Championship: Last 40: 2003
- World Matchplay: Last 32: 2004
- World Grand Prix: Last 16: 2002
- UK Open: Quarter Final: 2003
- Desert Classic: Last 24 Group: 2003

Dave Smith (born 17 June 1971) is an English professional darts player who plays in British Darts Organisation (BDO) events. He is nicknamed The Rhino.

== Career ==
Dave enjoyed most success in the PDC between 2002 and 2004, which included a quarter final in the 2003 UK Open, and qualifying for three other tournaments through a one-off qualifier.

Smith has earned a full PDC Pro Tour card for the 2011 and 2012 seasons via his world ranking.

== World Championship results ==
=== PDC ===
- 2003: Last 40: (lost to Mark Holden 3–4) (sets)
