= Al Hedman =

Jamaican darts player

Personal information
- Full name: Alfanso Hedman
- Nickname: "Daddy Cool"
- Born: 22 November 1953 (age 72) Kingston, Jamaica
- Home town: Kingston, Jamaica

Sport
- Sport: Darts
- Playing since: 1973
- Darts: 22g
- Laterality: Right-handed
- Walk-on music: "Kingston Town" by UB40

Organisation (see split in darts)
- BDO: 1995–1997
- PDC: 2001–2005

WDF major events – best performances
- World Masters: Last 128: 1995

PDC premier events – best performances
- World Championship: Last 40: 2003
- UK Open: Last 64: 2003

Other tournament wins
- Years
British Open	1995

Alfanso Hedman (born 22 November 1953) is a Jamaican former professional darts player who played in Professional Darts Corporation (PDC) events.

== Career ==
Hedman won the 1995 BDO British Open, defeating Andy Fordham of England. He qualified for the 1995 BDO European Darts Masters, but lost at the Last 24 stage to Bob Taylor of Scotland. Hedman lost to Paul Whitworth of England in the 1996 BDO Gold Cup. Hedman qualified for the 2003 PDC World Darts Championship, but lost at the Last-40 stage to Bob Anderson of England. He played in three stages of the UK Open, but losing at the Last-64 stage to Shayne Burgess of England. Hedman left the PDC in 2005.

== World Championship results ==
=== PDC ===
- 2003: Last 40 (lost to Bob Anderson 0–4)

== Personal life ==
Hedman has two children, James and Laura, and has been married to Lesley since 2002. His sister is Deta Hedman.
