= Doddridge (surname) =

Doddridge is an English surname. Notable people with the surname include:

- Eliza Doddridge (born 1999), Australian cricketer
- James Doddridge Patton (1850–1925), American politician
- John Doddridge (1555–1628), English lawyer and politician
- Joseph Doddridge (1746–1826), historian, horticulturist, physician, clergyman, and author
- Mercy Doddridge (1709–1790), British dissenting laywoman and letter-writer
- Philip Doddridge (1702–1751), English Nonconformist
- Philip Doddridge (Virginia politician) (1773–1832), U.S. Representative from Virginia
- Philip Doddridge McCulloch (1851–1928), American lawyer and politician
- Richard Doddridge Blackmore (1825–1900), English novelists

== See also ==
- Dodderidge
