= David Platt (darts player) =

Australian darts player

Personal information
- Nickname: "Babyface"
- Born: 22 April 1967 (age 59) Walsall, England
- Home town: Perth, Australia

Sport
- Sport: Darts
- Playing since: 1986
- Darts: 23 gram Winmau
- Laterality: Right-handed
- Walk-on music: "Working Class Man" by Jimmy Barnes

Organisation (see split in darts)
- BDO: 2011–2019
- PDC: 2002–2010
- WDF: 2020–
- Current world ranking: (WDF) NR (17 August 2026)

PDC premier events – best performances
- World Championship: Last 40: 2003
- UK Open: Last 32: 2004, 2007

Other tournament wins
- Years
Chester Hill Open	2016
DPA ProTour Event	2023
Oceanic Masters	2016
Russell Stewart Classic	2014
Victoria Open	2011, 2015

David Platt (born 22 April 1967) is an English-born Australian professional darts player who competes in events of the World Darts Federation (WDF).

== Career ==
Platt competed at the 2003 PDC World Darts Championship, where he was defeated in the first round by Steve Brown of the United States. He returned to the World Championship in 2006, again losing in the first round to defending champion Phil Taylor.

Platt emigrated from England to Perth in Western Australia in the middle of 2009, and began competing in Darts Players Australia (DPA) events the following year.

Platt finished second behind Corey Cadby in the 2016 DPA Australian Grand Prix rankings, having led the standings heading into the final two ranking events of the year. He went on to win the Oceanic Masters, defeating New Zealand's Cody Harris in the final, to qualify for the 2017 PDC World Championship. After defeating John Bowles by a score of 2 sets to nil in the preliminary round, Platt lost to Taylor by a score of 3 sets to nil in a rematch of his first-round match in 2006.

== World Championship results ==
=== PDC ===
- 2003: First round (lost to Steve Brown 2–4) (sets)
- 2006: First round (lost to Phil Taylor 0–3)
- 2017: First round (lost to Phil Taylor 0–3)
