= John MaGowan =

Northern Irish darts player

John Magowan
Personal information
- Nickname: "Mr Magoo"
- Born: 10 June 1941 (age 85) Newtownards, County Down, Northern Ireland
- Home town: Donaghadee, County Down, Northern Ireland

Sport
- Sport: Darts
- Playing since: 1959
- Darts: 22g Hi-Tec Multi Ring
- Laterality: Right-handed
- Walk-on music: "I'm Shipping Up to Boston" by Dropkick Murphys

Organisation (see split in darts)
- BDO: 1994–2002, 2012–2016
- PDC: 2002–2012

WDF major events – best performances
- World Masters: Last 32: 2001

PDC premier events – best performances
- World Championship: Last 32: 2009
- World Grand Prix: Quarter-finals: 2005
- UK Open: Semi-finals: 2006
- Desert Classic: Last 16: 2006
- US Open/WSoD: Last 128: 2008

John Magowan (born 10 June 1941) is a Northern Irish former professional darts player who has competed in the Professional Darts Corporation (PDC) and British Darts Organisation (BDO) events.

== BDO career ==
MaGowan reached the final of the Isle of Man Open in 1994, losing to Mick Manning. In 1997, MaGowan reached the quarter-finals of the Dutch Open and the WDF World Cup as well as the 1998 Norway Open. MaGowan's only major tournament in the BDO came in the 2001 World Masters, losing in the first round to John Walton.

== PDC career ==
Shortly afterwards, MaGowan switched to the PDC and in his first tournament, he reached the semi-finals of the UK Open Scottish Regional Final. A quarter final in the 2003 Eastbourne Pro followed and MaGowan played in the 2003 UK Open where he entered the third round outright but lost to Wayne Jones. He then played in the 2003 World Grand Prix in Dublin, losing in the first round to Wayne Mardle.

MaGowan reached the last 16 of the 2004 UK Open, starting in the first round with a 5–0 win over Moe Whelan. He then beat Steve Hine, Steve Johnson, and Steve Evans before losing to Kevin Painter.

MaGowan qualified for the 2005 World Grand Prix and beat Alan Caves and then Peter Manley to reach the quarter-finals. The run though was temporarily halted when he and his wife Maggie travelled to his son's wedding by helicopter before returning to the Citywest Hotel for his quarter-final game with Dennis Smith, which he lost 4–0.

MaGowan qualified for the 2006 PDC World Darts Championship where he lost to Dennis Priestley in the first round. He then had one of his best tournaments in the 2006 UK Open Darts when he made it to the semi-finals beating Painter, Matt Clark, Adrian Lewis and Robbie Green before losing 11–7 to the eventual winner of the tournament Raymond van Barneveld. He collected £7,500 in prize money. He then managed to qualify for the 2006 Las Vegas Desert Classic and beat Gerry Convery in the first round before losing to Chris Mason in the second round. His 2007 UK Open campaign began in the third round but was beaten 11–1 by van Barneveld. MaGowan's 2008 UK Open campaign was supposed to start in the second round, but his opponent Jimmy Mann could not play and he received a bye into the third round where he lost to fellow countryman Brendan Dolan.

In 2008 MaGowan wrote darts history by throwing a 9-dart finish at the PDC Players Championship in Eindhoven in the Netherlands. Aged 67 he became the oldest darts-player to throw a 9-darter in an official tournament. He went on to reach the quarter-finals. He returned to Dublin for the 2008 World Grand Prix but lost in the first round to Colin Osborne 1–2.

MaGowan won one of eight places for the 2009 PDC World Darts Championship at the qualifiers in Telford. He defeated Mason 3–0 in the first round but lost to Priestley in the second round 1–4.

MaGowan withdrew from the 2011 UK Open, where he was due to play Shaun Griffiths in the first round, after suffering a hip injury. He has not played in any PDC tournaments since, and at the 2011 World Grand Prix, commentator John Gwynne suggested that MaGowan had retired from professional darts.

== Personal life ==
MaGowan and his wife Maggie were married for 8 years. MaGowan gains most of the practice in a shed in his garden where at one stage, his wife locked him in his shed while going out shopping and was left in his shed for around five hours. Maggie died in May 2010.

MaGowan is an avid Birmingham City fan, with MaGowan using blue flights on his darts to signify this.

== World Championship results ==
=== PDC ===
- 2006: First round: (lost to Dennis Priestley 1–3) (sets)
- 2009: Second round: (lost to Dennis Priestley 1–4)
