= Les Fitton =

English darts player

Personal information
- Full name: Leslie Fitton
- Nickname: "The Natural"
- Born: 21 November 1964 (age 61) Farnworth, Lancashire, England

Sport
- Sport: Darts
- Playing since: 1984
- Darts: 19g
- Laterality: Right-handed
- Walk-on music: "Hi Ho Silver Lining" by Jeff Beck

Organisation (see split in darts)
- BDO: 1998–2000, 2010–2012
- PDC: 2000–2009

WDF major events – best performances
- World Championship: Last 32: 2000
- World Masters: Last 64: 1998, 2000

PDC premier events – best performances
- World Championship: Last 16: 2001, 2003
- World Matchplay: Last 32: 2000, 2002, 2003
- World Grand Prix: Last 32: 2002, 2003
- UK Open: Last 32: 2003, 2004

Other tournament wins
- Years
Lancashire Open	2000
Sheppey Darts Classic	2003
Vauxhall Spring Pro	2002

Leslie Fitton (born 21 November 1964) is an English former professional darts player who last played in Professional Darts Corporation (PDC) events.

Fitton previously played in one BDO World Darts Championships in 2000, losing 3–2 to Mervyn King in the last 32, and played in four PDC World Darts Championships between 2001 and 2004, reaching the last 16 in 2001 and 2003.

== World Championship performances ==
=== BDO ===
- 2000: Last 32: (lost to Mervyn King 2–3) (sets)

=== PDC ===
- 2001: Last 16: (lost to Phil Taylor 1–3)
- 2002: Last 32: (lost to John Lowe 1–4)
- 2003: Last 16: (lost to Alan Warriner 4–5)
- 2004: Last 32: (lost to Dennis Smith 2–4)
