= UK Open =

Annual darts tournament

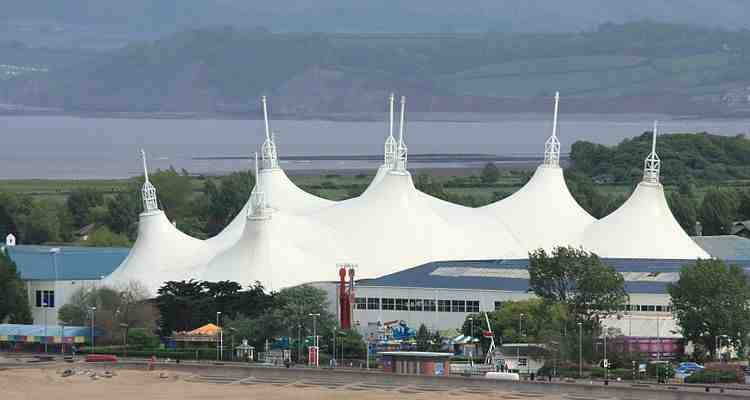
- Butlin's Minehead
- Founded: 2003
- First season: 2003
- Organizing body: PDC
- Country: England
- Venue: Butlin's Minehead
- Most recent champion: Luke Littler (2026)
- Tournament format: Legs

The Ladbrokes UK Open is a ranking major darts tournament held annually at the Butlins Minehead Resort by the Professional Darts Corporation (PDC) in England. The event is often referred to as the "FA Cup of darts" as it has an unseeded open draw made after each round, and entry is open to players at all levels of darts. One-hundred-and-sixty players compete in the multi-board event over eight-stages before the PDC’s Top 32 enter the tournament in the fourth round. The tournament has a prize fund of £600,000; the victor’s prize is £110,000.

== History ==
From 2003 to 2013, the UK Open took place in June each year at the Reebok Stadium, in Bolton. In 2014, it moved to Butlin's Minehead taking place in early March. Phil Taylor beat Shayne Burgess in the inaugural final. Dutchman Raymond van Barneveld won the tournament in 2006, in his first appearance in a PDC ranking event. He knocked out 13-times World Champion Phil Taylor 11–10 en route to the final where he beat Barrie Bates 13–7. He also successfully defended the title in 2007, again beating Taylor en route.

As the event has amateur and semi-professional qualifiers, it has produced some upset results over the years. In 2014, Aden Kirk, playing in his first televised match, beat defending and five-time champion Phil Taylor 9–7 in the third round. Kirk then beat Peter Wright 9–5 in the next round. In 2016, Rileys amateur qualifier Barry Lynn recorded a 9–3 win over reigning world champion Gary Anderson and reached the quarter-finals. A year later, Anderson lost to another Rileys qualifier, Paul Hogan, who followed up by beating Adrian Lewis in the next round.

Taylor achieved the perfect nine-dart finish four times (2004, 2005, 2007 & 2008). Mervyn King (2010), Gary Anderson (2012), Wes Newton (2013), Michael van Gerwen (2016 & 2020), Jonny Clayton (2020), Sebastian Białecki (2021), Jitse van der Wal (2021), José Justicia (2022), James Wade (2022) and Michael Smith (2022) have also achieved a nine-dart leg (although Newton's, Białecki’s, van der Wal’s and Justicia's were not televised live, while Clayton's and Smith's were only live on the PDC website). The tournament had a different runner-up for the first 13 years.

Because of extreme weather conditions and fears for the safety of visiting fans the unprecedented decision was taken by the host venue Butlins to play the entire 2018 UK Open behind closed doors leaving the public only being able to watch the event though ITV4’s live coverage and the PDC live web feed.

The Tournament was moved to the Marshall Arena in 2021 due to the COVID-19 pandemic and played behind closed doors.

== Format ==
Qualifying events for amateur players are organised by Rileys and held in various locations across the UK. 16 players qualify through these events.

The format is as follows (as of 2020):

- First round: The 16 Rileys qualifiers, 8 Challenge Tour qualifiers, 8 Development Tour qualifiers and Tour Card holders ranked 97–128 in the PDC Order of Merit.
- Second round: Players ranked 65–96 in the PDC Order of Merit join the 32 winners of the first round.
- Third round: Players ranked 33–64 join the 32 winners of the second round.
- Fourth round to final: Players ranked 1–32 in the PDC Order of Merit join the 32 winners of the third round.

The draws for the first three rounds are made in full after all qualifying players are known, while the draws for the fourth round onward are made separately on stage as soon as each preceding round has concluded.

== Finals ==
Year	Champion (average in final)	Score	Runner-up (average in final)	Prize money			Sponsor	Venue
Year	Champion (average in final)	Score	Runner-up (average in final)	Total	Champion	Runner-up	Sponsor	Venue
2003	Phil Taylor (98.03)	18–8	Shayne Burgess (91.36)	£124,000	£30,000	£15,000	Sky Bet	Premier Suite at Whites Hotel, Bolton
2004	Roland Scholten (89.49)	11–6	John Part (85.98)	£124,000	£30,000	£15,000	Budweiser	Premier Suite at Whites Hotel, Bolton
2005	Phil Taylor (96.80)	13–7	Mark Walsh (84.52)	£124,000	£30,000	£15,000	Budweiser	Premier Suite at Whites Hotel, Bolton
2006	Raymond van Barneveld (91.51)	13–7	Barrie Bates (82.98)	£124,000	£30,000	£15,000	Budweiser	Premier Suite at Whites Hotel, Bolton
2007	Raymond van Barneveld (94.99)	16–8	Vincent van der Voort (88.76)	£150,000	£30,000	£15,000	Blue Square	Premier Suite at Whites Hotel, Bolton
2008	James Wade (94.65)	11–7	Gary Mawson (87.33)	£178,000	£35,000	£15,000	Blue Square	Premier Suite at Whites Hotel, Bolton
2009	Phil Taylor (100.81)	11–6	Colin Osborne (93.24)	£200,000	£40,000	£20,000	Blue Square	Premier Suite at Whites Hotel, Bolton
2010	Phil Taylor (97.71)	11–5	Gary Anderson (92.41)	£200,000	£40,000	£20,000	Rileys Darts Zones	Premier Suite at Whites Hotel, Bolton
2011	James Wade (96.25)	11–8	Wes Newton (88.51)	£200,000	£40,000	£20,000	Speedy Hire	Premier Suite at Whites Hotel, Bolton
2012	Robert Thornton (95.44)	11–5	Phil Taylor (98.58)	£200,000	£40,000	£20,000	Speedy Hire	Premier Suite at Whites Hotel, Bolton
2013	Phil Taylor (107.04)	11–4	Andy Hamilton (97.95)	£200,000	£40,000	£20,000	Speedy Hire	Premier Suite at Whites Hotel, Bolton
2014	Adrian Lewis (109.13)	11–1	Terry Jenkins (93.15)	£250,000	£50,000	£25,000	Coral	Butlin's Minehead, Minehead
2015	Michael van Gerwen (98.43)	11–5	Peter Wright (99.33)	£300,000	£60,000	£30,000	Coral	Butlin's Minehead, Minehead
2016	Michael van Gerwen (106.68)	11–4	Peter Wright (98.33)	£300,000	£60,000	£30,000	Coral	Butlin's Minehead, Minehead
2017	Peter Wright (100.44)	11–6	Gerwyn Price (97.78)	£350,000	£70,000	£35,000	Coral	Butlin's Minehead, Minehead
2018	Gary Anderson (95.71)	11–7	Corey Cadby (99.78)	£350,000	£70,000	£35,000	Coral	Butlin's Minehead, Minehead
2019	Nathan Aspinall (88.72)	11–5	Rob Cross (84.79)	£450,000	£100,000	£40,000	Ladbrokes	Butlin's Minehead, Minehead
2020	Michael van Gerwen (101.42)	11–9	Gerwyn Price (99.16)	£450,000	£100,000	£40,000	Ladbrokes	Butlin's Minehead, Minehead
2021	James Wade (102.52)	11–5	Luke Humphries (97.95)	£450,000	£100,000	£40,000	Ladbrokes	Arena MK, Milton Keynes
2022	Danny Noppert (84.82)	11–10	Michael Smith (90.33)	£450,000	£100,000	£40,000	Cazoo	Butlin's Minehead, Minehead
2023	Andrew Gilding (95.46)	11–10	Michael van Gerwen (96.74)	£600,000	£110,000	£50,000	Cazoo	Butlin's Minehead, Minehead
2024	Dimitri Van den Bergh (95.18)	11–10	Luke Humphries (96.07)	£600,000	£110,000	£50,000	Ladbrokes	Butlin's Minehead, Minehead
2025	Luke Littler (101.51)	11–2	James Wade (88.06)	£600,000	£110,000	£50,000	Ladbrokes	Butlin's Minehead, Minehead
2026	Luke Littler (99.58)	11–7	James Wade (89.49)	£750,000	£120,000	£60,000	Ladbrokes	Butlin's Minehead, Minehead

== Records and statistics ==
As of 8 March 2026.

=== Total finalist appearances ===
Rank	Player	Won	Runner-up	Finals	Appearances
1	Phil Taylor	5	1	6	14
2	**James Wade**	3	2	5	23
3	**Michael van Gerwen**	3	1	4	18
4	**Raymond van Barneveld**	2	0	2	18
4	**Luke Littler**	2	0	2	3
6	**Peter Wright**	1	2	3	18
7	**Gary Anderson**	1	1	2	17
8	Roland Scholten	1	0	1	11
8	Robert Thornton	1	0	1	13
8	**Adrian Lewis**	1	0	1	20
8	**Nathan Aspinall**	1	0	1	10
8	**Danny Noppert**	1	0	1	8
8	**Andrew Gilding**	1	0	1	12
8	**Dimitri Van den Bergh**	1	0	1	8
15	**Gerwyn Price**	0	2	2	12
15	**Luke Humphries**	0	2	2	8
17	Shayne Burgess	0	1	1	4
17	John Part	0	1	1	14
17	Mark Walsh	0	1	1	13
17	Barrie Bates	0	1	1	12
17	**Vincent van der Voort**	0	1	1	17
17	Gary Mawson	0	1	1	3
17	Colin Osborne	0	1	1	9
17	Wes Newton	0	1	1	14
17	Andy Hamilton	0	1	1	16
17	Terry Jenkins	0	1	1	16
17	Corey Cadby	0	1	1	1
17	**Rob Cross**	0	1	1	10
17	**Michael Smith**	0	1	1	17

- Active players are shown in **bold**
- Only players who reached the final are included
- In the event of identical records, players are sorted by date first achieved

=== Champions by country ===
Country	Players	Total	First title	Last title
England	6	13	2003	2026
Netherlands	4	7	2004	2022
Scotland	3	3	2012	2018
Belgium	1	1	2024	2024

=== Nine-dart finishes ===
Sixteen nine-darters have been thrown at the UK Open. The first one was in 2004, and eleven of them have been televised. Wes Newton in 2013, Sebastian Białecki and Jitse van der Wal in 2021 and José Justicia in 2022 hit nine-darters that were not broadcast.

Player	Year (+ Round)	Method	Opponent	Result	Ref.
Phil Taylor	2004, 4th Round	3 x T20; 3 x T20; T20, T19, D12	Matt Chapman	8–2	
Phil Taylor	2005, Semi-Final	3 x T20; 3 x T20; T20, T19, D12	Roland Scholten	11–6	
Phil Taylor	2007, 5th Round	3 x T20; 3 x T20; T20, T19, D12	Wes Newton	11–5	
Phil Taylor	2008, 4th Round	3 x T20; 2 x T20, T19; 2 x T20, D12	Jamie Harvey	9–1	
Mervyn King	2010, 5th Round	3 x T20; 3 x T20; T20, T19, D12	Gary Anderson	8–9	
Gary Anderson	2012, 3rd Round	3 x T20; 3 x T20; T20, T19, D12	Davey Dodds	9–3	
Wes Newton	2013, 6th Round	3 x T20; 3 x T20; T20, T19, D12†	Adrian Lewis	8–9	
Michael van Gerwen	2016, 4th Round	3 x T20; 3 x T20; T20, T19, D12	Rob Cross	9–5	
Jonny Clayton	2020, 6th Round	3 x T20; 3 x T20; T20, T19, D12	Chris Dobey	10–8	
Michael van Gerwen	2020, Semi-Final	3 x T20; 3 x T20; T20, T19, D12	Daryl Gurney	11–3	
Sebastian Białecki	2021, 1st Round	3 x T20; 3 x T20; 141 CO †	Jim McEwan	6–2	
Jitse van der Wal	2021, 2nd Round	3 x T20; 3 x T20; 141 CO †	Sebastian Białecki	3–6	
José Justicia	2022, 3rd Round	3 x T20; 3 x T20; 141 CO †	Adam Gawlas	5–6	
James Wade	2022, 6th Round	3 x T20; 3 x T20; T20, T19, D12	Boris Krčmar	10–8	
Michael Smith	2022, 6th Round	3 x T20; 3 x T20; T20, T19, D12	Mensur Suljović	10–9	
Danny Noppert	2026, 4th Round	3 x T20; 3 x T20; T20, T19, D12	Dimitri Van den Bergh	10–4	

† not televised

=== High averages ===
Ten highest UK Open one-match averages
Average	Player	Year (+ Round)	Opponent	Result
118.66	Phil Taylor	2010, Last 32	Kevin Painter	9–0
115.92	(Germany) Niko Springer	2025, 1st Round	(Norway) Cor Dekker	6–2
115.62	Phil Taylor	2009, Quarter-Final	Mark Lawrence	10–0
115.51	Phil Taylor	2009, Last 32	Ken Mather	9–3
114.91	Michael van Gerwen	2015, Last 16	Kim Huybrechts	9–2
114.54	Phil Taylor	2008, Last 16	Wes Newton	9–3
113.05	Phil Taylor	2010, Semi-Final	Denis Ovens	10–5
111.67	Phil Taylor	2015, Last 16	Vincent van der Voort	9–3
110.88	Peter Wright	2017, Quarter-Final	Raymond van Barneveld	10–8
110.81	Michael van Gerwen	2020, Quarter-Final	Rob Cross	10–4
110.72	Phil Taylor	2012, Last 16	Ronnie Baxter	9–4

Five highest tournament averages
Average	Player	Year
107.82	Phil Taylor	2015
107.38	Phil Taylor	2009
106.81	Phil Taylor	2013
106.43	Phil Taylor	2010
105.57	Michael van Gerwen	2015

== Media coverage ==
From 2003 until 2013, coverage for the UK Open was shown on Sky Sports in June. In 2014 the tournament was moved to March and coverage of the event moved to ITV4.

== Notes ==
- ^{a} Each year is linked to an article about that particular event's draw.
