= David Fatum =

Canadian-American darts player (born 1968)

Personal information
- Nickname: "The Scorpion"
- Born: 4 August 1968 (age 58) Prince Rupert, British Columbia, Canada
- Home town: Phoenix, Arizona, U.S.

Sport
- Sport: Darts
- Playing since: 1989
- Darts: Cosmo Signature
- Laterality: Right-handed
- Walk-on music: "Thunderstruck" by AC/DC

Organisation (see split in darts)
- BDO: 2013–2017
- PDC: 1994–1996, 2006–2010, 2017–2018
- WDF: 2021–
- Current world ranking: (WDF) 44 ▼1 (17 August 2026)

WDF major events – best performances
- World Championship: Last 32: 2025
- World Masters: Last 32: 2025
- Dutch Open: Runner-up: 2025

PDC premier events – best performances
- World Championship: Last 64: 2009
- UK Open: Last 128: 2009
- US Open/WSoD: Semi-final: 2008

Other tournament wins
- Tournament: Years
- ADO Bluebonnet Classic ADO Camellia Classic ADO Scottsdale Wild West Shootout ADO London Bridge Classic Greater Vancouver Open: 2012 2007, 2008; 2010, 2011; 2014; 2018

David Fatum (born August 4, 1968) is a Canadian-American darts player who competes in World Darts Federation (WDF) and Professional Darts Corporation (PDC) events. Nicknamed "the Scorpion", he was a semi-finalist at the 2008 US Open and runner-up at the 2025 Dutch Open.

== Career ==
Fatum's first major exposure came in the 2008 US Open where he reached the semi-finals losing to Colin Lloyd. In his third-round game, he defeated Davis Snider who had earlier beaten North American Darts champion Darin Young and former BDO world champion Steve Beaton. He then beat Stephen Panuncialman who beat Paul Lim in the third round. He then secured wins over Bill Davis and Chris Mason before eventually bowing out to Lloyd.

His performance contributed to him finishing 3rd in the American order of merit, earning him a place in the 2009 PDC World Darts Championship. He defeated Shane O'Connor in the preliminary round, but was beaten by Wayne Mardle in the first round.

== World Championship results ==
=== PDC ===
- 2009: First round (lost to Wayne Mardle 0–3) (sets)

=== WDF ===
- 2025: Second round (lost to Jenson Walker 1–3)
