= 2008 U.S. Open =

2008 U.S. Open may refer to:

- 2008 U.S. Open (golf), a major golf tournament
- 2008 US Open (tennis), a Grand Slam tennis tournament
- 2008 Lamar Hunt U.S. Open Cup, a soccer tournament for U.S. teams
- 2008 US Open Darts
