= 2009 US Open (darts) =

US Open Players Championship

Tournament information
- Dates: 23 August 2009
- Venue: Holiday Inn Select
- Location: Atlanta, Georgia
- Country: United States
- Organisation(s): PDC
- Format: PDC Pro Tour, Legs
- Prize fund: $50,000
- Winner's share: $12,000

Champion(s)
- (England) Dennis Priestley

The 2009 US Open Players Championship was a professional darts competition and the third edition of the US Open tournament organised by the Professional Darts Corporation (PDC).

In 2009 the US Open became part of the PDC Pro Tour. The two prior editions were PDC Major events.

Dennis Priestley won the tournament, beating Andy Hamilton in the final.

== Draw ==
Players in bold denote match winners.

Third round Best of 11 legs
(England) James Wade | 2
(England) **Colin Monk** | **6**
(Netherlands) Jelle Klaasen | 3
(England) **Kirk Shepherd** | **6**
(England) Colin Osborne | 3
(England) **Steve Beaton** | **6**
(England) Mark Walsh | 5
(England) **Wes Newton** | **6**
(Wales) Mark Webster | 3
(England) **Colin Lloyd** | **6**
(England) **Andy Hamilton** | **6**
(Wales) Barrie Bates | 3
(England) Ronnie Baxter | 5
(England) **Steve Maish** | **6**
(Scotland) **Robert Thornton** | **6**
(England) Tony Eccles | 5
(Canada) John Part | 4
(England) **Dennis Smith** | **6**
(England) **Peter Manley** | **6**
(United States) Donny Joe | 1
(England) **Dennis Priestley** | **6**
(England) Kevin McDine | 3
(England) Wayne Mardle | 2
(England) **Andy Jenkins** | **6**
(England) **Alan Tabern** | **6**
(England) Matt Clark | 4
(England) Kevin Painter | 1
(England) **Jamie Caven** | **6**
(England) **Terry Jenkins** | **6**
(England) Steve Hine | 2
(England) **Denis Ovens** | **6**
(Netherlands) Roland Scholten | 4

Fourth round Best of 11 legs
(England) Colin Monk | 2
(England) **Kirk Shepherd** | **6**
(England) Steve Beaton | 2
(England) **Wes Newton** | **6**
(England) Colin Lloyd | 5
(England) **Andy Hamilton** | **6**
(England) Steve Maish | 2
(Scotland) **Robert Thornton** | **6**
(England) Dennis Smith | 1
(England) **Peter Manley** | **6**
(England) **Dennis Priestley** | **6**
(England) Andy Jenkins | 1
(England) **Alan Tabern** | **6**
(England) Jamie Caven | 1
(England) **Terry Jenkins** | **6**
(England) Denis Ovens | 3

Quarter-finals; Best of 11 legs
(England) Kirk Shepherd | 2
(England) **Wes Newton** | **6**
(England) **Andy Hamilton** | **6**
(Scotland) Robert Thornton | 1
(England) Peter Manley | 1
(England) **Dennis Priestley** | **6**
(England) **Alan Tabern** | **6**
(England) Terry Jenkins | 0

Semi-finals; Best of 11 legs
(England) Wes Newton | 2
(England) **Andy Hamilton** | **6**
(England) **Dennis Priestley** | **6**
(England) Alan Tabern | 2

Final; Best of 11 legs
(England) Andy Hamilton | 3
(England) **Dennis Priestley** | **6**
