= John Kuczynski =

American darts player

Personal information
- Nickname: "Johnny K"
- Born: 16 October 1973 (age 53) Bloomsburg, Pennsylvania, U.S.
- Home town: Zion Grove, Pennsylvania, U.S.

Sport
- Sport: Darts
- Playing since: 1995
- Darts: 23g Dynasty Johnny K Signature
- Laterality: Right-handed
- Walk-on music: "Walk This Way" by Aerosmith and Run-D.M.C.

Organisation (see split in darts)
- BDO: 2001–2006, 2013–2015
- PDC: 2006–2012

WDF major events – best performances
- World Championship: Last 32: 2005
- World Masters: Last 128: 2003

PDC premier events – best performances
- World Championship: Last 16: 2006
- UK Open: Last 64: 2007
- Desert Classic: Last 32: 2004, 2005, 2007
- US Open/WSoD: Last 16: 2006

Other tournament wins
- Tournament: Years
- ADO Long Island Fall Classic Soft Tip Bullshooter Asia Championship Soft Tip Bullshooter World Championship WDF Americas Cup Singles WDF World Cup Team: 2012 2007 2007 2004; 2003

John Kuczynski (born October 16, 1973) is an American former professional darts player. He used the nickname Johnny K for his matches.

== Career ==
For five years running – 2002, 2003, 2004, 2005 and 2006 – he was ranked number one according to American Darts Organisation's (ADO) points standings.

He played at the 2005 BDO World Darts Championship, losing in the first round to former world champion Ted Hankey.

He was the ADO's 2006 National cricket champion. In 2005, he reached the last 32 at the Las Vegas Desert Classic and was a finalist at the Quebec Open and a member of the U.S. World Cup Team.

He played in the 2006 PDC World Darts Championship, whitewashing Lionel Sams in the first round without dropping a single leg. He then went on to beat Dutchman Jan van der Rassel in the second round before losing to Gary Welding in the last 16. Kuczynski had won the first set and could have taken the second before Welding leveled. The American went back in front to lead 2–1, but Welding fought back to take the next three sets and a quarter final place to end Kuczynski's run.

At the 2006 World Series of Darts where the prize for an American winner was $1 million, he was the only American player who managed to progress beyond the opening round. He defeated John Part in the first round but went out in the second round to Wayne Mardle.

He reached the third round of the 2008 US Open, beating Vincent van der Voort and Canadian Daniel Beauregard in the first two rounds before losing to Ben Burton. The next day he reached the quarter-finals of the North American Darts Championship. Kuczynski then suffered a disappointing exit from the 2008 UK Open, losing in the preliminary round to pub qualifier Johnny Haines.

== World Championship Results ==
=== BDO ===
- 2005: 1st Round (lost to Ted Hankey 1–3) (sets)

=== PDC ===
- 2006: 3rd Round (lost to Gary Welding 2–4)
- 2007: 1st Round (lost to Mark Dudbridge 1–3)
