= 2004 World Grand Prix (darts) =

2004 Sky Bet World Grand Prix

Tournament information
- Dates: 18–24 October 2004
- Venue: Citywest Hotel
- Location: Dublin, Ireland
- Organisation(s): Professional Darts Corporation (PDC)
- Format: Sets "double in, double out"
- Prize fund: £100,000
- Winner's share: £20,000
- High checkout: 164 Chris Mason

Champion(s)
- Colin Lloyd (ENG)

The 2004 Sky Bet World Grand Prix was the seventh staging of the World Grand Prix darts tournament, organised by the Professional Darts Corporation. It was held at the Citywest Hotel in Dublin, Ireland, from 18 to 24 October 2004.

The first round saw the finalists for the previous two years, Phil Taylor and John Part, get knocked out, Taylor losing to Andy Callaby and Part to Ronnie Baxter. The final was contested between Colin Lloyd and 2001 champion Alan Warriner, with Lloyd winning 7–3.

== Prize money ==
Position (num. of players)		Prize money (Total: £100,000)
Winner	(1)	£20,000
Runner-Up	(1)	£10,000
Semi-finalists	(2)	£6,000
Quarter-finalists	(4)	£4,000
Second round losers	(8)	£2,250
First round losers	(16)	£1,500

== Seeds ==
The tournament featured eight seeds.

1. (England) Phil Taylor
2. (Canada) John Part
3. (England) Colin Lloyd
4. (England) Peter Manley
5. (Netherlands) Roland Scholten
6. (England) Wayne Mardle
7. (England) Kevin Painter
8. (England) Andy Jenkins

== Draw ==
Players in bold denote match winners.

**First round** (best of 3 sets); 18–19 October
1	(England) Phil Taylor 87.96	0
(England) **Andy Callaby** 91.26	**2**
(Republic of Ireland) Jack McKenna 70.50	1
(England) **Dennis Priestley** 77.64	**2**
8	(England) **Andy Jenkins** 75.75	**2**
(England) Alex Roy 71.76	1
(Scotland) Jamie Harvey 75.57	1
(England) **Alan Warriner** 77.79	**2**
5	(Netherlands) **Roland Scholten** 87.12	**2**
(England) Dave Askew 80.52	0
(England) Peter Evison 68.97	1
(England) **Chris Mason** 68.88	**2**
4	(England) **Peter Manley** 87.24	**2**
(England) Mark Dudbridge 77.49	1
(England) Paul Williams 73.59	1
(England) **Steve Beaton** 73.44	**2**
2	(Canada) John Part 81.36	0
(England) **Ronnie Baxter** 86.31	**2**
(England) Lionel Sams 80.58	0
(England) **Mark Walsh** 80.04	**2**
7	(England) **Kevin Painter** 77.49	**2**
(Republic of Ireland) Peter Quinn 68.61	1
(Northern Ireland) Mark Wilton 54.99	0
(Northern Ireland) **Brendan Dolan** 62.77	**2**
6	(England) Wayne Mardle 77.16	0
(England) **Gary Welding** 85.65	**2**
(England) **Adrian Lewis** 75.75	**2**
(Wales) Richie Burnett 62.10	0
3	(England) **Colin Lloyd** 92.19	**2**
(England) Denis Ovens 90.69	1
(England) Bob Anderson 81.48	0
(England) **Dennis Smith** 84.54	**2**

**Second round** (best of 5 sets); 20–21 October
(England) **Andy Callaby** 82.53	**3**
(England) Dennis Priestley 79.05	2
8	(England) Andy Jenkins 78.72	2
(England) **Alan Warriner** 76.95	**3**
5	(Netherlands) Roland Scholten 82.17	1
(England) **Chris Mason** 82.56	**3**
4	(England) Peter Manley 84.87	1
(England) **Steve Beaton** 87.81	**3**
(England) **Ronnie Baxter** 83.55	**3**
(England) Mark Walsh 77.85	2
7	(England) **Kevin Painter** 73.56	**3**
(Northern Ireland) Brendan Dolan 71.22	1
(England) **Gary Welding** 76.53	**3**
(England) Adrian Lewis 72.09	0
3	(England) **Colin Lloyd** 86.94	**3**
(England) Dennis Smith 81.63	0

**Quarter-finals** (best of 7 sets); 22 October
(England) Andy Callaby 67.50	1
(England) **Alan Warriner** 71.01	**4**
(England) Chris Mason 80.25	3
(England) **Steve Beaton** 77.82	**4**
(England) **Ronnie Baxter** 87.15	**4**
7	(England) Kevin Painter 84.39	2
(England) Gary Welding 64.71	0
3	(England) **Colin Lloyd** 83.37	**4**

**Semi-finals** (best of 11 sets); 23 October
(England) **Alan Warriner** 79.86	**6**
(England) Steve Beaton 78.82	5
(England) Ronnie Baxter 80.73	5
3	(England) **Colin Lloyd** 84.93	**6**

**Final** (best of 13 sets); 24 October
(England) Alan Warriner 77.91	3
3	(England) **Colin Lloyd** 85.29	**7**
