= 2006 Las Vegas Desert Classic =

Las Vegas Desert Classic

In 2006 the Las Vegas Desert Classic, an American darts tournament, was won by the Canadian player John Part.

== Qualifiers ==
=== Pro Qualified players ===
PDC Top 12
1. (England) Phil Taylor
2. (England) Colin Lloyd
3. (England) Ronnie Baxter
4. (England) Peter Manley
5. (England) Wayne Mardle
6. (England) Andy Jenkins
7. (England) Kevin Painter
8. (England) Dennis Priestley
9. (England) Mark Dudbridge
10. (England) Denis Ovens
11. (Netherlands) Roland Scholten
12. (England) Terry Jenkins

North American Qualifiers
1. (United States) Darin Young
2. (United States) Ray Carver
3. (United States) Brad Wethington

Canadian Number One
1. (Canada) Gerry Convery

=== Qualifiers ===
Monday Qualifiers
- (Netherlands) Raymond van Barneveld
- (England) Chris Mason
- (Canada) John Part
- (England) Adrian Lewis
- (England) Steve Beaton
- (England) Bob Anderson
- (Republic of Ireland) Mick McGowan
- (England) Dennis Smith

Tuesday Qualifiers
- (England) Andy Smith
- (England) Andy Hamilton
- (England) Wes Newton
- (Wales) Barrie Bates
- (Northern Ireland) John MaGowan
- (England) Matt Clark
- (England) Steve Smith
- (United States) Bill Davis

== Prize Fund ==
Stage (no. of players)		Prize money (Total: £84,100)
Winner	(1)	$15,000
Runner-Up	(1)	$7,500
Semi-finalists	(2)	$5,000
Quarter-finalists	(4)	$3,500
Round 2	(8)	$2,000
Round 1	(16)	$1,350

== Results ==
Round 1 (best of 11 legs); 28 June
(Canada) John Part	6
(England) Ronnie Baxter	3
(Netherlands) Roland Scholten	6
(England) Bob Anderson	4
(England) Terry Jenkins	6
(United States) Bill Davis	1
(Wales) Barrie Bates	6
(England) Mark Dudbridge	2
(England) Wes Newton	6
(England) Wayne Mardle	3
(Republic of Ireland) Mick McGowan	6
(United States) Ray Carver	3
(England) Chris Mason	6
(England) Colin Lloyd	1
(Northern Ireland) John Magowan	6
(Canada) Gerry Convery	2
(Netherlands) Raymond van Barneveld	6
(United States) Darin Young	2
(England) Steve Smith	6
(England) Denis Ovens	2
(England) Andy Hamilton	6
(England) Kevin Painter	4
(England) Matt Clark	6
(United States) Brad Wethington	3
(England) Phil Taylor	6
(England) Adrian Lewis	0
(England) Andy Jenkins	6
(England) Andy Smith	3
(England) Dennis Priestley	6
(England) Dennis Smith	2
(England) Peter Manley	6
(England) Steve Beaton	4

Round 2 (best of 5 sets); 29 June
(Canada) John Part	3
(Netherlands) Roland Scholten	0
(England) Terry Jenkins	3
(Wales) Barrie Bates	1
(England) Wes Newton	3
(Republic of Ireland) Mick McGowan	1
(England) Chris Mason	3
(Northern Ireland) John Magowan	0
(Netherlands) Raymond van Barneveld	3
(England) Steve Smith	0
(England) Andy Hamilton	3
(England) Matt Clark	0
(England) Phil Taylor	3
(England) Andy Jenkins	0
(England) Dennis Priestley	3
(England) Peter Manley	1

Quarter-finals (best of 5 sets); 30 June
(Canada) John Part (89.07)	3
(England) Terry Jenkins (87.18)	2
(England) Wes Newton (89.82)	3
(England) Chris Mason (91.38)	2
(Netherlands) Raymond van Barneveld (98.73)	3
(England) Andy Hamilton (93.66)	1
(England) Phil Taylor (100.53)	3
(England) Dennis Priestley (98.49)	0

Semi-finals (best of 7 sets); 1 July
(Canada) John Part (90.60)	4
(England) Wes Newton (88.26)	2
(Netherlands) Raymond van Barneveld (98.04)	4
(England) Phil Taylor (99.15)	3

Final (best of 11 sets); 2 July
(Canada) John Part (92.79)	6
(Netherlands) Raymond van Barneveld (92.85)	3
