= Roger Carter (darts player) =

American darts player

Personal information
- Nickname: "Taz"
- Born: October 28, 1961 (age 65) Sandusky, Ohio, U.S.
- Home town: Auburn, Alabama, U.S.

Sport
- Sport: Darts
- Playing since: 1978
- Darts: 20 Gram
- Laterality: Right-handed
- Walk-on music: "I Won't Back Down" by Tom Petty and the Heartbreakers

Organisation (see split in darts)
- BDO: 1995–1999
- PDC: 2000–2012

WDF major events – best performances
- World Championship: Quarter Finals: 1997
- World Masters: Last 16: 1996

PDC premier events – best performances
- UK Open: Last 96: 2007
- Desert Classic: Last 24 Group Stage: 2003
- US Open/WSoD: Last 16: 2008

Other tournament wins
- Tournament: Years
- Virginia Beach Classic ADO Music City Classic Charlotte Open ADO Music City Classic ADO Rocket City Shocktober Open: 1997, 2000, 2001; 2010 2007; 2013; 2013

Roger Carter (born October 28, 1961) is an American former professional darts player who played in British Darts Organisation (BDO) and Professional Darts Corporation (PDC) events.

== Career ==
Carter appeared in the BDO World Darts Championship four times with his best run being in 1997 when he made it to the Quarter finals, where he lost to Marshall James. Since 2000, Carter has played in PDC tournaments, playing mainly in their North American events, including the Las Vegas Desert Classic, the World Series of Darts and the US Open which replaced the World Series in 2007. Carter hit a nine-darter during the Desert Classic qualifiers but eventually failed to qualify for the event.

He currently lives in Auburn, Alabama.

== World Championship results ==
=== BDO ===
- 1996: 1st Round (lost to Geoff Wylie 1–3) (sets)
- 1997: Quarter-Finals (lost to Marshall James 3–4)
- 1998: 2nd Round (lost to Roland Scholten 1–3)
- 1999: 1st Round (lost to Ted Hankey 1–3)
