= 2003 Las Vegas Desert Classic =

Tournament information
- Dates: 30 June – 6 July 2003
- Venue: MGM Grand Casino and Hotel
- Location: Las Vegas, Nevada
- Country: United States
- Organisation(s): PDC
- Format: Legs; Final – best of 31
- Prize fund: $88,000
- Winner's share: $22,000

Champion(s)
- (England) Peter Manley

The 2003 Las Vegas Desert Classic was the second major Professional Darts Corporation Las Vegas Desert Classic darts tournament. It was held in the MGM Grand Casino and Hotel, Las Vegas, Nevada in early July.

26 players competed in the tournament. Peter Manley defeated John Part 16–12 in legs in the final to win his only PDC major title and won $22,000.

== Qualifiers ==
=== Seeds ===
1. (Canada) John Part
2. (England) Phil Taylor
3. (Netherlands) Roland Scholten
4. (England) Peter Manley
5. (England) Ronnie Baxter
6. (England) Colin Lloyd
7. (England) Alan Warriner
8. (England) Dennis Smith

=== Qualifiers ===
- (England) Terry Jenkins
- (England) Alex Roy
- (England) Bob Anderson
- (England) Dave Smith
- (England) Wayne Mardle
- (England) Paul Williams
- (England) Denis Ovens
- (England) Steve Beaton
- (England) Robbie Widdows
- (England) Les Hodkinson
- (England) Dennis Priestley
- (Wales) Andrew Davies
- (Wales) Richie Burnett
- (Scotland) Jamie Harvey
- (United States) Tony Payne
- (United States) Roger Carter
- (United States) Ricky Villanueva
- (Canada) Gerry Convery

== Prize Fund ==
Stage (no. of players)		Prize money (Total: $88,000)
Winner	(1)	$22,000
Runner-up	(1)	$10,000
Semi-finalists	(2)	$6,000
Quarter-finalists	(4)	$4,000
Group Stages (Last 24)	(16)	$1,750

== Results ==
=== Men's tournament ===
==== Preliminary round 30 June ====
Player	Score	Player
(Canada) Gerry Convery	5 – 6	(United States) Roger Carter
(United States) Tony Payne	6 – 5	(United States) Ricky Villanueva

==== Group Stages 1–3 July ====
===== Group A =====
POS	Player	P	W	L	LF	LA	+/-	Pts	Status
1	(Canada) John Part (1)	2	2	0	16	11	+5	4	Advance to the quarter-finals
2	(England) Bob Anderson	2	1	1	12	11	+1	2	Eliminated
3	(England) Dave Smith	2	0	2	10	16	−6	0	Eliminated

Bob Anderson (England)	8 – 3	(England) Dave Smith
John Part (1) (Canada)	8 – 7	(England) Dave Smith
John Part (1) (Canada)	8 – 4	(England) Bob Anderson

===== Group B =====
POS	Player	P	W	L	LF	LA	+/-	Pts	Status
1	(England) Dennis Smith (8)	2	2	0	16	9	+7	4	Advance to the quarter-finals
2	(Wales) Richie Burnett	2	1	1	12	14	-2	2	Eliminated
3	(England) Dennis Priestley	2	0	2	11	16	−5	0	Eliminated

Richie Burnett (Wales)	8 – 6	(England) Dennis Priestley
Dennis Smith (8) (England)	8 – 5	(England) Dennis Priestley
Dennis Smith (8) (England)	8 – 4	(Wales) Richie Burnett

===== Group C =====
POS	Player	P	W	L	LF	LA	+/-	Pts	Status
1	(England) Phil Taylor (2)	2	2	0	16	6	+10	4	Advance to the quarter-finals
2	(England) Terry Jenkins	2	1	1	11	12	-1	2	Eliminated
3	(England) Alex Roy	2	0	2	7	16	−9	0	Eliminated

Terry Jenkins (England)	8 – 4	(England) Alex Roy
Phil Taylor (2) (England)	8 – 3	(England) Alex Roy
Phil Taylor (2) (England)	8 – 3	(England) Terry Jenkins

===== Group D =====
POS	Player	P	W	L	LF	LA	+/-	Pts	Status
1	(England) Alan Warriner (7)	2	2	0	16	8	+8	4	Advance to the quarter-finals
2	(England) Robbie Widdows	2	1	1	11	13	-2	2	Eliminated
3	(England) Les Hodkinson	2	0	2	10	16	−6	0	Eliminated

Robbie Widdows (England)	8 – 5	(England) Les Hodkinson
Alan Warriner (7) (England)	8 – 5	(England) Les Hodkinson
Alan Warriner (7) (England)	8 – 3	(England) Robbie Widdows

===== Group E =====
POS	Player	P	W	L	LF	LA	+/-	Pts	Status
1	(Netherlands) Roland Scholten (3)	2	2	0	16	9	+7	4	Advance to the quarter-finals
2	(England) Wayne Mardle	2	1	1	13	13	0	2	Eliminated
3	(Wales) Andrew Davies	2	0	2	9	16	−7	0	Eliminated

Wayne Mardle (England)	8 – 5	(Wales) Andrew Davies
Roland Scholten (3) (Netherlands)	8 – 4	(Wales) Andrew Davies
Roland Scholten (3) (Netherlands)	8 – 5	(England) Wayne Mardle

===== Group F =====
POS	Player	P	W	L	LF	LA	+/-	Pts	Status
1	(England) Colin Lloyd (6)	2	2	0	16	11	+5	4	Advance to the quarter-finals
2	(Scotland) Jamie Harvey	2	1	1	12	13	-1	2	Eliminated
3	(United States) Roger Carter	2	0	2	12	16	−4	0	Eliminated

Jamie Harvey (Scotland)	8 – 5	(United States) Roger Carter
Colin Lloyd (6) (England)	8 – 7	(United States) Roger Carter
Colin Lloyd (6) (England)	8 – 4	(Scotland) Jamie Harvey

===== Group G =====
POS	Player	P	W	L	LF	LA	+/-	Pts	Status
1	(England) Peter Manley (4)	2	1	1	15	12	+3	2	Advance to the quarter-finals
2	(England) Paul Williams	2	1	1	12	13	-1	2	Eliminated
3	(England) Denis Ovens	2	1	1	13	15	−2	2	Eliminated

Paul Williams (England)	8 – 5	(England) Denis Ovens
Denis Ovens (England)	8 – 7	(England) (4) Peter Manley
Peter Manley (4) (England)	8 – 4	(England) Paul Williams

===== Group H =====
POS	Player	P	W	L	LF	LA	+/-	Pts	Status
1	(England) Steve Beaton	2	2	0	16	11	+5	4	Advance to the quarter-finals
2	(United States) Tony Payne	2	1	1	12	9	+3	2	Eliminated
3	(England) Ronnie Baxter (5)	2	0	2	8	16	−8	0	Eliminated

Steve Beaton (England)	8 – 4	(United States) Tony Payne
Tony Payne (United States)	8 – 1	(England) (5) Ronnie Baxter
Steve Beaton (England)	8 – 7	(England) (5) Ronnie Baxter

==== Main Round 4–6 July ====
Quarter-finals (best of 15 legs); 4 July
1	(Canada) John Part 99.24	8
8	(England) Dennis Smith 84.21	3
2	(England) Phil Taylor 96.72	8
7	(England) Alan Warriner-Little 88.71	5
3	(Netherlands) Roland Scholten 86.97	5
6	(England) Colin Lloyd 85.11	8
4	(England) Peter Manley 89.43	8
(England) Steve Beaton 83.01	6

Semi-finals (best of 25 legs); 5 July
1	(Canada) John Part 95.67	13
2	(England) Phil Taylor 95.76	10
6	(England) Colin Lloyd 86.85	9
4	(England) Peter Manley 89.10	13

Final (best of 31 legs); 6 July
1	(Canada) John Part 95.07	12
4	(England) Peter Manley 96.81	16

=== Women's tournament ===
Semi-finals (best of 7 legs)
(United States) Stacy Bromberg	4
(England) Jane Stubbs	2
(England) Deta Hedman	4
(England) Crissy Manley	0

Final (best of 11 legs)
(United States) Stacy Bromberg	6
(England) Deta Hedman	4
