= 2005 Premier League Darts =

Darts competition

2005 888.com Premier League Darts

Tournament information
- Dates: 20 January–31 May 2005

Champion(s)
- Phil Taylor

The 2005 888.com Premier League was the first season of the Premier League Darts tournament organised by the Professional Darts Corporation.

Phil Taylor, Colin Lloyd, Peter Manley, John Part, Roland Scholten, Wayne Mardle and wildcard entrant Mark Dudbridge were the seven players who competed in a round-robin tournament which had a total prize fund of £140,000 – with £50,000 going to the eventual winner.

== Format ==
The Premier League started in Stoke-on-Trent on 20 January 2005 before moving around the country. The league system the players play each other twice over 12 legs, with two points for a win and one for a draw. All 12 legs were played regardless of whether a result had already been achieved. Phil Taylor achieved two 11–1 wins, although the last few legs were irrelevant to the match result. Legs played in these circumstances were known as 'dead legs'.

== Venues ==
For the inaugural Premier League Darts event, all 11 venues used were in England.

Locations of the 2005 Premier League venues in England.

== Results ==
=== League stage ===
==== 20 January – Week 1 ====
King's Hall, Stoke-on-Trent

	Score	
Wayne Mardle (England); 84.75	5 – 7	(England) Phil Taylor; 98.76
John Part (Canada); 95.61	6 – 6	(Netherlands) Roland Scholten; 96.96
Peter Manley (England); 84.54	4 – 8	(England) Mark Dudbridge; 86.04
Phil Taylor (England); 102.15	6 – 6	(England) Colin Lloyd; 99.15

==== 3 February – Week 2 ====
Rivermead Centre, Reading

	Score	
Mark Dudbridge (England); 95.13	5 – 7	(Netherlands) Roland Scholten; 92.34
Wayne Mardle (England); 85.20	4 – 8	(England) Peter Manley; 87.93
Colin Lloyd (England); 93.69	9 – 3	(Canada) John Part; 87.21
Roland Scholten (Netherlands); 88.71	2 – 10	(England) Phil Taylor; 105.81

==== 17 February – Week 3 ====
Wellsprings Centre, Taunton

	Score	
Colin Lloyd (England); 96.57	6 – 6	(England) Mark Dudbridge; 85.59
John Part (Canada); 93.81	9 – 3	(England) Wayne Mardle; 87.06
Peter Manley (England); 93.54	6 – 6	(Netherlands) Roland Scholten; 94.02
Mark Dudbridge (England); 93.81	5 – 7	(England) Phil Taylor; 95.28

==== 10 March – Week 4 ====
Sports Village, Norwich

	Score	
Phil Taylor (England); 104.70	11 – 1	(England) Wayne Mardle; 89.73
Colin Lloyd (England); 88.23	8 – 4	(England) Peter Manley; 85.92
Mark Dudbridge (England); 86.88	5 – 7	(Canada) John Part; 86.37
Roland Scholten (Netherlands); 90.54	4 – 8	(England) Wayne Mardle; 90.93

==== 31 March – Week 5 ====
Sands Centre, Carlisle

	Score	
Phil Taylor (England); 100.20	8 – 4	(England) Peter Manley; 93.72
Roland Scholten (Netherlands); 99.78	7 – 5	(England) Mark Dudbridge; 99.30
Colin Lloyd (England); 96.57	6 – 6	(England) Wayne Mardle; 97.80
Peter Manley (England); 88.62	6 – 6	(Canada) John Part; 86.82

==== 21 April – Week 6 ====
Pavilions, Plymouth

	Score	
John Part (Canada); 85.71	5 – 7	(England) Peter Manley; 86.91
Mark Dudbridge (England); 98.85	6 – 6	(England) Colin Lloyd; 99.33
Wayne Mardle (England); 98.31	6 – 6	(Netherlands) Roland Scholten; 99.42
Phil Taylor (England); 98.16	7 – 5	(Canada) John Part; 93.03

==== 28 April – Week 7 ====
Glades Arena, Kidderminster

	Score	
Roland Scholten (Netherlands); 95.82	5 – 7	(England) Colin Lloyd; 94.80
Mark Dudbridge (England); 90.99	8 – 4	(England) Wayne Mardle; 98.31
John Part (Canada); 89.67	4 – 8	(England) Phil Taylor; 100.77
Peter Manley (England); 92.73	4 – 8	(England) Colin Lloyd; 94.05

==== 5 May – Week 8 ====
Kingsway Leisure Centre, Widnes

	Score	
Phil Taylor (England); 103.65	9 – 3	(England) Mark Dudbridge; 95.94
Colin Lloyd (England); 88.41	8 – 4	(Netherlands) Roland Scholten; 80.88
Wayne Mardle (England); 91.35	8 – 4	(Canada) John Part; 87.90
Peter Manley (England); 89.73	1 – 11	(England) Phil Taylor; 103.95

==== 12 May – Week 9 ====
The Dome Leisure Centre, Doncaster

	Score	
Roland Scholten (Netherlands); 92.31	7 – 5	(Canada) John Part; 93.90
Colin Lloyd (England); 87.00	2 – 10	(England) Phil Taylor; 103.89
Wayne Mardle (England); 99.81	7 – 5	(England) Mark Dudbridge; 96.36
Roland Scholten (Netherlands); 82.05	5 – 7	(England) Peter Manley; 86.85

==== 19 May – Week 10 ====
Charter Hall, Colchester

	Score	
John Part (Canada); 92.22	5 – 7	(England) Mark Dudbridge; 94.47
Peter Manley (England); 85.59	7 – 5	(England) Wayne Mardle; 86.16
John Part (Canada); 97.20	8 – 4	(England) Colin Lloyd; 95.85
Phil Taylor (England); 98.43	9 – 3	(Netherlands) Roland Scholten; 99.60
Mark Dudbridge (England); 88.59	5 – 7	(England) Peter Manley; 86.40
Wayne Mardle (England); 91.53	5 – 7	(England) Colin Lloyd; 93.30

=== Play-offs – 30–31 May ===
G-Mex, Manchester

	Score	
30 May – Semi-finals (best of 25 legs)
Phil Taylor (England); 91.95	13 – 11	(Netherlands) Roland Scholten; 93.21
Colin Lloyd (England); 96.02	13 – 7	(England) Peter Manley; 93.05
31 May – Final (best of 31 legs)
Phil Taylor (England); 101.01	16 – 4	(England) Colin Lloyd; 97.20

== Table and streaks ==
=== Table ===
Pos	Name	Pld	W	D	L	Pts	LF	LA	+/-	LWAT	A
1	(England) Phil Taylor W	12	11	1	0	23	103	41	+62	46	101.31
2	(England) Colin Lloyd RU	12	6	4	2	16	77	67	+10	28	93.91
3	(England) Peter Manley	12	5	2	5	12	65	79	−14	22	88.54
4	(Netherlands) Roland Scholten	12	3	3	6	9	62	82	−20	17	92.70
5	(England) Mark Dudbridge	12	3	2	7	8	68	76	−8	23	92.66
6	(Canada) John Part	12	3	2	7	8	67	77	−10	19	90.79
7	(England) Wayne Mardle	12	3	2	7	8	62	82	−20	22	91.75

NB: LWAT = Legs Won Against Throw. Players separated by +/- leg difference if tied.

=== Streaks ===
Player	Week																				Play-offs	
Player	1		2		3		4		5		6		7		8		9		10		SF	F
(England) Phil Taylor	W	D	W		W		W		W		W		W		W	W	W		W		W	W
(England) Colin Lloyd	D		W		D		W		D		D		W	W	W		L		L	W	W	L
(England) Peter Manley	L		W		D		L		L	D	W		L		L		W		W	W	L	
(Netherlands) Roland Scholten	D		W	L	D		L		W		D		L		L		W	L	L		L	
(England) Mark Dudbridge	W		L		D	L	L		L		D		W		L		L		W	L		
(Canada) John Part	D		L		W		W		D		L	L	L		L		L		L	W		
(England) Wayne Mardle	L		L		L		L	W	D		D		L		W		W		L	L		

NB: W = Won D = Drawn L = Lost

== Player statistics ==
The statistics shown are for the league stage only. Playoffs are not included.

Player	Longest unbeaten run	Most consecutive wins	Most consecutive draws	Most consecutive losses	Longest without a win	Biggest victory	Biggest defeat
(England) Phil Taylor	12	10	1	0	1	11–1	—N/a
(England) Colin Lloyd	9	3	2	2	2	9–3	2–10
(England) Peter Manley	3	3	1	2	4	8–4	1–11
(Netherlands) Roland Scholten	2	1	1	2	6	7–5	2–10
(England) Mark Dudbridge	2	1	1	4	6	8–4	3–9
(Canada) John Part	3	2	1	6	7	9–3	3–9
(England) Wayne Mardle	3	2	2	4	4	8–4	1–11
