= 2003 World Grand Prix (darts) =

2003 Paddy Power World Grand Prix

Tournament information
- Dates: 20–26 October 2003
- Venue: Citywest Hotel
- Location: Dublin, Ireland
- Organisation(s): Professional Darts Corporation (PDC)
- Format: Sets "double in, double out"
- Prize fund: £76,000
- Winner's share: £15,000
- High checkout: 170 Alan Warriner

Champion(s)
- Phil Taylor (ENG)

The 2003 Paddy Power World Grand Prix was the sixth staging of the World Grand Prix darts tournament, organised by the Professional Darts Corporation. It was held at the Citywest Hotel in Dublin, Ireland, from 20 to 26 October 2003.

For the second consecutive year, the final was contested between Phil Taylor and John Part. Taylor won 7–2 (which included a crucial run of twelve consecutive legs) to secure his fifth Grand Prix title.

== Prize money ==
| Position (num. of players) | | Prize money (Total: £76,000) |
|---|---|---|
| Winner | (1) | £15,000 |
| Runner-Up | (1) | £7,500 |
| Semi-finalists | (2) | £4,750 |
| Quarter-finalists | (4) | £2,500 |
| Second round losers | (8) | £1,750 |
| First round losers | (16) | £1,250 |

== Seeds ==
The World Grand Prix featured eight seeds.

1. (England) Phil Taylor
2. (Canada) John Part
3. (England) Peter Manley
4. (Netherlands) Roland Scholten
5. (England) Colin Lloyd
6. (England) Dennis Smith
7. (England) Ronnie Baxter
8. (England) Alan Warriner

== Draw ==
Players in bold denote match winners.

**First round** (best of 3 sets); 20–21 October
1 | (England) **Phil Taylor** | **2**
(England) Steve Beaton | 0
(England) Peter Evison | 1
(England) **Dennis Priestley** | **2**
8 | (England) **Alan Warriner** | **2**
(England) Bob Anderson | 0
(Northern Ireland) Roy Montgomery | 0
(England) **Keith Deller** | **2**
5 | (England) **Colin Lloyd** | **2**
(Wales) Richie Burnett | 0
(Republic of Ireland) Martin Murphy | 0
(England) **Mark Walsh** | **2**
4 | (Netherlands) **Roland Scholten** | **2**
(England) John Lowe | 0
(England) Dave Askew | 0
(England) **Denis Ovens** | **2**
2 | (Canada) **John Part** | **2**
(England) Alex Roy | 0
(Northern Ireland) John MaGowan | 0
(England) **Wayne Mardle** | **2**
7 | (England) Ronnie Baxter | 1
(England) **Kevin Painter** | **2**
(England) **Andy Jenkins** | **2**
(England) Mark Dudbridge | 1
6 | (England) **Dennis Smith** | **2**
(England) Les Fitton | 1
(Scotland) **Jamie Harvey** | **2**
(England) Alan Caves | 1
3 | (England) **Peter Manley** | **2**
(England) Peter Allen | 0
(England) **Paul Williams** | **2**
(Republic of Ireland) Mattie Murtagh | 0

**Second round** (best of 5 sets); 22–23 October
1 | (England) **Phil Taylor** | **3**
(England) Dennis Priestley | 0
8 | (England) **Alan Warriner** | **3**
(England) Keith Deller | 0
5 | (England) **Colin Lloyd** | **3**
(England) Mark Walsh | 1
4 | (Netherlands) **Roland Scholten** | **3**
(England) Denis Ovens | 1
2 | (Canada) **John Part** | **3**
(England) Wayne Mardle | 2
(England) **Kevin Painter** | **3**
(England) Andy Jenkins | 0
6 | (England) **Dennis Smith** | **3**
(Scotland) Jamie Harvey | 0
3 | (England) **Peter Manley** | **3**
(England) Paul Williams | 1

**Quarter-finals** (best of 7 sets); 24 October
1 | (England) **Phil Taylor** | **4**
8 | (England) Alan Warriner | 1
5 | (England) Colin Lloyd | 0
4 | (Netherlands) **Roland Scholten** | **4**
2 | (Canada) **John Part** | **4**
(England) Kevin Painter | 1
6 | (England) Dennis Smith | 2
3 | (England) **Peter Manley** | **4**

**Semi-finals** (best of 11 sets); 25 October
1 | (England) **Phil Taylor** | **6**
4 | (Netherlands) Roland Scholten | 1
2 | (Canada) **John Part** | **6**
3 | (England) Peter Manley | 3

**Final** (best of 13 sets); 26 October
1 | (England) **Phil Taylor** | **7**
2 | (Canada) John Part | 2
