= John Part =

Canadian darts player (born 1966)

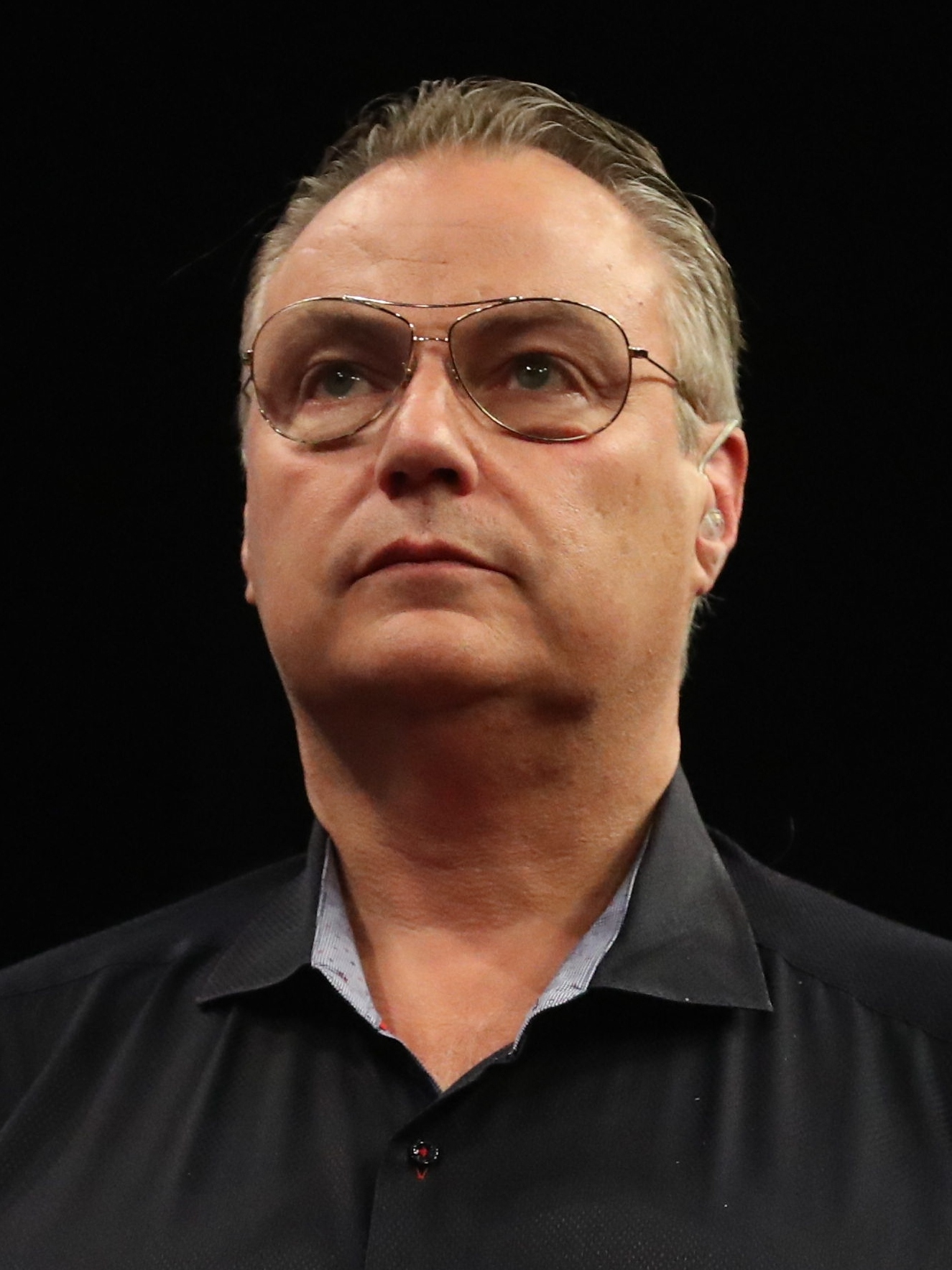
- Part in 2022

Personal information
- Nickname: "Darth Maple"
- Born: 29 June 1966 (age 60) Toronto, Ontario, Canada
- Home town: Oshawa, Ontario, Canada

Sport
- Sport: Darts
- Playing since: 1987
- Darts: 23g Loxley Darts Signature
- Laterality: Right-handed
- Walk-on music: "The Imperial March" (Darth Vader's theme from Star Wars)

Organisation (see split in darts)
- BDO: 1993–1997
- PDC: 1997– (Tour Card: 2011-2018)

WDF major events – best performances
- World Championship: Winner (1): 1994
- World Masters: Last 16: 1995, 1997
- World Trophy: Last 16: 2007
- Int. Darts League: Last 32 Group: 2007

PDC premier events – best performances
- World Championship: Winner (2): 2003, 2008
- World Matchplay: Runner-up: 2002, 2005
- World Grand Prix: Runner-up: 2002, 2003
- UK Open: Runner-up: 2004
- Grand Slam: Quarter-final: 2007, 2012
- European Championship: Last 32: 2008, 2009, 2011, 2013
- Premier League: 6th: 2005, 2009
- Desert Classic: Winner (1) 2006
- US Open/WSoD: Semi-final: 2007
- PC Finals: Last 16: 2009

WSDT major events – best performances
- World Championship: Last 16: 2022, 2023, 2025
- World Matchplay: Last 16: 2022, 2023, 2024
- World Masters: Quarter-final: 2023

Other tournament wins
- Years
BlueBerry Hill Open (x4)	1993, 2000; 2001, 2002
Canadian Mixed Pairs	1995
Canada National Championships (x5)	1995, 2001, 2002, 2004, 2007
Quebec Open (x4)	1994, 1996, 1999, 2002
Sycrause Open (x3)	1991, 1997, 2001
Soft Tip Bullshooter World Championship	2008
Windy City Open (x3)	1994, 2002, 2003
BDO/WDF Events
Bob Jones Memorial	2005
Canadian Open (x3)	1995, 2001, 2004
Cleveland Extravagnza	1995, 2002
Houston Open (x4)	1992, 2002; 2003, 2005
Klondike Open (x3)	1993, 1996, 1998
Las Vegas Open	1998
WDF Americas Cup Singles	2002
WDF Pacific Cup Mixed Pairs	1994
WDF Pacific Cup Overall	1994
WDF World Cup Pairs	1993
Championship Darts Circuit Pro Tour (x1)
2018
PDC Events
Eastbourne Open	2000
Golden Harvest North American Cup	2004
Ireland Autumn Classic	2002
Ireland Spring Classic	2002
Le Skratch Montreal Open	2007
North American Darts Championship	2010
North American Pro Tour Chicago	2012
Nations Cup Singles	2002
Northern Ireland Open	2002
Vauxhall Autumn Open	2003
Vauxhall Spring Open (x2)	2002, 2003
West Tyrone Open	2003
Witch City Pro	2002
European Tour Events (x1)
UK Masters	2013
Players Championships (x5)
2007, 2008, 2011 (x3)
UK Open Qualifiers (x1)
2003

Other achievements
- PDC World Number 1 January to June 2003 Member of Oshawa Sports Hall of Fame; Member of National Darts Federation of Canada Hall of Fame Member of the PDC Hall of Fame
- Updated on 2017

John Part (born 29 June 1966) is a Canadian former professional darts player and current commentator, who competes in Professional Darts Corporation (PDC) events. Nicknamed "Darth Maple", he is a three-time World Champion, having won the 1994 BDO World Darts Championship on his world championship debut, and the PDC World Championship in 2003 and 2008. Widely regarded as one of the greatest players in the history of the sport, Part is statistically North America's greatest darts player to date. He was the first non-British player to win the World Championship, and the only non-European to date to win the PDC World Darts Championship.

Part's first Championship was the second time a non-seeded player won the BDO World Darts Championship, and one of the few times where a player only lost one set in the entire tournament. His nine-year gap between his first and second World Championships is tied with Ted Hankey for the longest gap between World Championships, and his third victory in 2008 saw him become the first player in history to win a world title in three venues, and the first to win at the Alexandra Palace. His 2008 win saw him join Phil Taylor, Eric Bristow, Raymond van Barneveld and John Lowe as the only players with three or more World Championships, and become only the second player (after Taylor) to win multiple PDC titles.

In 2017, he was inducted into the PDC Hall of Fame.

== Career ==
=== 1987–1994: Beginnings and BDO World Championship ===
Born in Toronto, Ontario, Part was given a dartboard by his parents as a Christmas present in 1987. Though television coverage of darts in Canada is rare and live coverage is almost non-existent, Part was still able to view the World Professional Darts Championship and the World Masters, where he would learn his game from some of the most famous champions in the sport, particularly Bob Anderson. Part began playing pub games in 1989, and he won his first significant title at the Syracuse Open in 1991 and became a professional in the same year. Soon, he was representing Canada in the WDF World Cup. Part has stated that he was 'produced as a darts player by the North American game', and that his experiences playing against some of the greatest North American players of the time gave him the capability of winning world championships.

By 1993, Part was Canada's highest ranked player and was competing in prestigious events sanctioned by the British Darts Organisation. A significant win soon came in the 1993 WDF World Cup, where he and Carl Mercer won the Pairs Championship for Canada. Nevertheless, when he qualified for the 1994 BDO World Championship, he was still a relative unknown. This was the first BDO World Championship since the acrimonious split in darts, and, as a result, the field included many newcomers and debutants, including Part himself. In the first round Part defeated second seed Ronnie Baxter in straight sets, and thereafter swept through to the final beating Paul Lim, Steve McCollum and Ronnie Sharp dropping only one set en route. He faced the charismatic veteran Bobby George in the final and won 6–0 in sets. Little over six years after receiving his first dartboard, Part had won a World Championship; he was the first non-British player to do so, and he is one of the few players to win the tournament on their debut. Part's achievement of dropping only one set in winning a World Championship is only matched by Eric Bristow from the 1984 BDO World Darts Championship, and later by Phil Taylor in the 2001 PDC World Darts Championship.

=== 1995–2000: Lean years and move to the PDC ===
Part did not consolidate his early success during most of the 1990s. Despite more wins on the North American circuit, including the Canadian Open and Canadian National Championships in 1995, Part struggled to make an impact in the major tournaments in the United Kingdom after his 1994 BDO World Championship success at Lakeside. In the 1995 BDO World Championship, Part only won one match in defending his title; losing in the second round to Paul Williams. Part and Williams had another match in the first round of the 1996 BDO World Championship, this time with Part winning, but Part did not make it to the quarter-finals of the BDO World Championship again after 1994, nor did he reach the quarter-finals of the World Masters during his entire BDO career. Despite his initial whirlwind success, Part was struggling to reach the heady heights of his breakthrough win. In June 1997, Part left the British Darts Organisation and joined the rival Professional Darts Corporation, and has competed in PDC sanctioned events ever since then. In the 1997 World Matchplay, Part lost to Drew O'Neill 4–6.

Joining the PDC, however, did not initially provide the improvement Part hoped for. His performances in the major events continued to be indifferent, including early exits in the 1998 and 1999 PDC World Championships. The new millennium, however, brought small success for Part. Despite a quiet 2000 PDC World Championship, where he was eliminated in the round of sixteen, he had a smaller victory in the Eastbourne Open in 2000. Part then achieved his highest placing in a major PDC event by reaching the quarter-finals of the 2000 PDC World Grand Prix. These slightly improved results were only a harbinger, however, for what was to be the most storied and successful phase of Part's career.

=== 2001–2003: PDC World Championship and World Number One ===
The 2001 PDC World Darts Championship was a turning point in Part's career, even though he would lose in the final. Part comfortably advanced through the tournament until the semi-final, where he defeated Essex veteran Rod Harrington 6–5 to reach his first major PDC final. There he met Phil Taylor, who had won the last six world championships and was considered as darts' greatest ever player. It was Part's first meeting with Taylor in an official PDC match. Taylor, who had been in stunning form throughout the tournament, averaged 107.46 and had a 72% checkout rate in the final, now considered one of darts' most dominant showings; Part only won three legs in the entire match as Taylor stormed to a 7–0 win. Taylor's performance, described as 'ludicrous' by The Guardian, while simply regarded by darts commentator Sid Waddell as a 'vicious example of near perfection' and an 'annihilation', could have seriously affected Part's confidence. But it would only provide the Canadian with further motivation to challenge the best. Over the next two years, Part won a string of minor titles, rose to number two in the world rankings and developed a rivalry with Taylor that would define this stage of his career.

In the quarter-finals of the 2001 World Matchplay, Taylor beat Part 16–4. In the quarter-finals of the 2002 PDC World Championship, Part was again beaten by Taylor in a world championship, this time 6–0; Taylor went on to win his eighth consecutive world championship and his tenth world championship in all. However, Part gave Taylor a serious test in the 2002 World Matchplay final. In a first to 18 legs contest, Part led 16–15. But Taylor stunned the Canadian by winning three legs in a row to emerge an 18–16 winner in what is now regarded as a classic final. Part's wait for a first PDC major went on while Taylor's dominance continued. In October 2002, Part again reached a major final at the 2002 World Grand Prix, but the result was similar. This time Taylor comfortably defeated Part 7–3 in sets, although Part recovered from a slow start and a 1–5 deficit to give Taylor a challenge in the last 4 sets. Taylor and Part were now considered the two best players in the world, but there were serious doubts over whether Part could beat 'The Power' having already suffered five televised defeats, including two whitewashes in the World Championship and the close loss in the 2002 World Matchplay. Going into the 2003 PDC World Championship, Taylor was the heavy favourite. However, Taylor showed more vulnerabilities during the tournament than at the previous few world championships, with both Wayne Mardle and Dennis Smith winning 3 sets off of Taylor. Taylor also comfortably won an anticlimactic grudge match in the semi-final against Alan Warriner by 6–1. Part, as the number two seed, reached the final as well, with a 5–3 win over Jamie Harvey in the second round, with Part hitting a vital 161 checkout when it was 3–3 in sets and 2–2 in legs with Harvey waiting on 40. Part then crushed Chris Mason 5–0 in the quarter-finals, though Part's semi-final was considerably more difficult. In a testing game, Part defeated Essex-born Kevin Painter 6–4 in a match similar to his 2001 semi-final with Rod Harrington.

Prior to the final, the odds seemed against Part. He had lost 13 straight world championship sets to Taylor in the two years prior; and had lost all five of his televised matches against Taylor. Part had just come through a tiring semi-final against Painter, while Taylor had cruised through against Warriner. Finally, Taylor had won eight consecutive world championships and was on a 44-match winning streak in the tournament. Against the odds, Part announced his intentions immediately in the final; he checked out 121 on the bullseye in the first leg. Thereafter he stunned Taylor by racing into set leads of 3–0 and 4–1, but this only stirred Taylor into taking the next four sets and leading 5–4. Part took the next two sets to lead 6–5 and was one set away from the world title. Taylor then took the next set to take the match into a deciding set. In the deciding set, Part broke Taylor's throw and held his nerve to win the title with his first match dart. He had become world champion for the second time and ended Taylor's eight-tournament winning streak, inflicting Taylor's first defeat at the PDC World Championship since 1994.

The final is now regularly referred to as one of the greatest ever games of darts. Part has stated this win was the most special of all of his victories. Similar to his BDO World Championship achievement, Part was the first non-British player to win the PDC World Championship. He is also one of only four men to have won both versions of the darts world championship. With his victory, Part also ascended to world number one in the PDC world rankings.

=== 2003–2005: Triumphs and regrets ===
The three years following Part's second world championship victory were marked by two distinct and contrasting outcomes. First, Part secured a number of televised victories over his rival Taylor. However, he did not consolidate these victories in the major events, and did not win any major title from February 2003 through 2005. There were minor successes; Part won the first event he entered – the UK Open Southwest Regional Final – after his world championship victory, beating Taylor along the way, and later in 2003 added the Windy City Open and two Vauxhall Opens to his silverware collection. But the major titles were not forthcoming. Part recorded another victory over Taylor in the 2003 Las Vegas Desert Classic semi-final, but lost in the final 16–12 in legs as Peter Manley took the crown. There were exits in the last sixteen of the 2003 UK Open and the 2003 World Matchplay, though Part made a second consecutive appearance in the World Grand Prix final. However, Taylor again comfortably defeated Part in this event, winning the final 7–2. At this point, Taylor had also retaken the world number one ranking from Part.

2004 began with another defeat. The Canadian entered the 2004 PDC World Championship as the reigning champion, but did not win any match in the defence of his title. He was given a bye to the third round, where he came up against debutant Mark Dudbridge but lost 4–3. Phil Taylor would go on to retake the World Championship crown with a 7–6 win over Kevin Painter in the final. In 2004, Part had much success in North America, where he again won the Canadian Open and Canadian National Championships, as well as winning the Golden Harvest North American Cup. Despite Taylor regaining the PDC World Championship, Part once again defeated 'The Power' in the 2004 UK Open quarter-final, with an 8–6 win. Part would then go on to reach his only major final of 2004 at the same event, but was soundly beaten 11–6 in the final by Roland Scholten. At the 2004 World Matchplay, Part began with a 10–0 whitewash of Colin Monk in the first round, and then beat Bob Anderson in the second round, where Part survived four match darts against him and eventually won in a tiebreak by 17–15. In his quarter final match against Andy Jenkins, Part struggled for much of the match and trailed 7–11, but Part fought his way back to eventually win 16–14, setting up a highly anticipated semi final match against Taylor, with Part having won 3 of his previous 4 matches against Taylor on Sky Sports. Despite Part's recent wins over Taylor on TV, Part started the semi-final against Taylor poorly, averaging in the low 80s and seeing Taylor cruise to a 10–0 lead on a mid 90s average, as the 150/1 shot of a 17–0 whitewash looked a possibility. However, Part improved his game from the eleventh leg onwards, but losing the first 10 legs had left Part with far too much to do. Taylor won the match 17–8. After beating Part, Taylor went on to beat Mark Dudbridge 18–8 in the final, to win his fifth consecutive World Matchplay title and his seventh World Matchplay title in all.

In 2005, Part did not win a single tournament. In the 2005 PDC World Championship, Part reached the last sixteen but came up against Dudbridge again. The Bristolian had become something of a bête noire to Part's world championship attempts, and Dudbridge beat Part again, by a 4–2 scoreline (Taylor eventually defeated Dudbridge in the final). Following the world championship, Part was invited into the inaugural Premier League, but it was not a happy campaign. Despite being in a good position after 4–5 weeks, Part then lost six successive matches towards the latter end of the league and finished sixth out of the seven participants. For Part, the highlights of 2005 were two of his most renowned televised clashes against Taylor. While 'The Power' was dominating the televised events, Part was sliding down the rankings. Nevertheless, Part proved to be Taylor's only consistent challenger during this time. In June, Part outplayed Taylor to lead 4–0, 7–1 and 10–6 in legs during their match in the Last 16 of the 2005 UK Open, but Taylor came back to win 11–10 and went on to win the tournament. Part avenged this defeat in July in the quarter-final in the 2005 World Matchplay. Though Taylor led 4–1 in the early stages, Part hit back to lead 5–4 and 7–5. After Taylor drew level at 7–7, the two players traded legs thereafter until they were matched at 11–11. Part then started to pull away and won five straight legs to achieve a 16–11 victory over 'The Power', ending Taylor's 27-match winning streak in the World Matchplay, inflicting Taylor's first defeat at the World Matchplay since 1999. After defeating Taylor, Part faced Peter Manley in the semi-finals, a match that was hyped up as a rematch of the 2003 Las Vegas Desert Classic final that Part had lost to Manley. Manley won his 2005 World Matchplay quarter final match against Wayne Mardle after coming back from 9–14 down to win 16–14. In the semi-final, Part also led Manley by 14–9, and Manley threatened a similar comeback against Part as what he had done against Mardle by getting it back to 14–14 and Manley even went in front at 16–15. Part eventually won the match in a tiebreak, 18–16, to get through to the final. Part, however, was yet again a runner-up in the tournament, as Colin Lloyd beat Part 18–12 in the final, with Lloyd hitting a 170 checkout in the final leg.

Overall, covering the years of 2003, 2004 and 2005, Part defeated Taylor four times on television, meaning that Part was responsible for all but one of Taylor's five losses on television during this period – but Part went on to lose in the final in three of the four televised events where he defeated Taylor. This statistic, combined with the unsuccessful Premier League campaign and the two world championship losses to Dudbridge, made this a less fruitful period for Part, reflected by his slide in the rankings.

=== 2006–2008: Las Vegas Champion and third World Championship ===
The year 2006 was seminal to both the Professional Darts Corporation, and Part's career. 2006 heralded the arrival of four-times BDO World Champion Raymond van Barneveld to the PDC. With van Barneveld's arrival and his immediate impact in the 2006 Premier League, Part was no longer perceived as Taylor's main rival (indeed, Part has not beaten Taylor in a televised match since his 2005 World Matchplay victory). Part's shaken status was not helped by a defeat in the third round of the 2006 PDC World Championship to Wayne Mardle. Despite these setbacks, Part's career experienced something of a renewal in the three years that followed. In July, he won his first major title since the 2003 World Championship with victory in the 2006 Las Vegas Desert Classic. The Desert Classic had long been a fruitful tournament for Part; in its eight-year history he reached six semi-finals, but it was only in 2006 that he won the trophy. In 2003, he had lost out in the final to Peter Manley having beaten Phil Taylor in the semi-final; this time van Barneveld did the same. The Dutchman had beaten Taylor in the semi-final, and in a tense final initially matched Part 3–3. However, the Canadian won nine of the next eleven legs to secure a 6–3 victory and his second major title in the PDC.

Part's other major results in 2006 were indifferent however, including Phil Taylor defeating Part 13–2 in the second round of the 2006 World Matchplay. The match was heavily hyped up beforehand with Part and Taylor having played many classic matches before and Part having beaten Taylor four times on television. However, their match at the 2006 World Matchplay was anticlimactic throughout as Taylor played below average and Part played poorly throughout. Part also had another less successful World Championship in 2007. This time he was eliminated in the second round by Chris Mason. The defeat meant that Part had not reached the quarter-finals of the PDC World Championship since his world title victory in 2003, while van Barneveld went on to defeat Phil Taylor 7–6 in the final. But for the rest of 2007, Part returned to some of his best form. He reached three semi-finals of televised majors: US Open; the World Grand Prix, and the Las Vegas Desert Classic (though he could not defend his title in the latter). These consistent performances meant he entered the 2008 PDC World Championship as the 11th seed, though he was not considered one of the favourites for the event. Nevertheless, Part advanced steadily through the tournament, setting the tournament's highest average in the second round against Mensur Suljović. He then came through a tight quarter-final against the 2007 PDC Player of the Year and third seed James Wade, winning in a deciding set 5–4. In the semi-final he faced Kevin Painter, reminiscent of his 2003 triumph; Part once again emerged victorious, 6–2 this time, and found himself in his fourth world championship final.

In a tournament where the contemporary superpowers of the game had faltered – Taylor had lost 5–4 to Wayne Mardle in the quarter-finals and reigning champion van Barneveld had been eliminated by Painter in the third round – a 500–1 rank outsider would face Part in the final. Debutant Kirk Shepherd, a 21-year-old qualifier and the sport's youngest ever world-finalist, was Part's opponent. The matchup recalled his 1994 final, though Part had moved from novice to established veteran and Shepherd, this time, was the young debutant. But Part was not to suffer the same fate as Bobby George had. While Shepherd had shown remarkable guile, moxie and perhaps good fortune in defeating stalwarts of the PDC's top 10, including Mardle, Peter Manley, and Terry Jenkins, the experience of Part proved a step too far. The Canadian raced into a 4–0 lead and though Shepherd brought the match back to 5–2, Part closed out the match before the comeback could become troubling, winning the final two sets for a 7–2 victory and a third world championship. He thus joined Taylor, van Barneveld, Eric Bristow and John Lowe as the fifth player to have won more than two world championships. With this win he also became the second player to win the PDC World Championship more than once, after Taylor. Part also set a new record in becoming the first player to win the world championship in three venues – having won the 1994 BDO World Championship at the Lakeside, the 2003 PDC title at the Circus Tavern and in 2008 at Alexandra Palace.

However, the years after Part's championship wins in 1994 and 2003 were less successful, and 2008 followed the same trend. Initially, Part enjoyed some success; just as in 2003, he won the first tournament he entered as world champion with a victory in the Gibraltar Players Championship. But it was to be his only PDC victory for the next two years. Invited into the Premier League for the second time, Part was in poor form throughout the tournament and finished bottom of the league. The results hardly improved, as Part's year was marked by early defeats in most televised tournaments despite his high seeding, most pointedly in the first round of the 2008 Las Vegas Desert Classic, a tournament that Part had thrived in for many years. To round off a terrible year, Part's world championship defence ended as poorly as it had in 2004. In the 2009 PDC World Championship, he was drawn against American qualifier Bill Davis, but did not win a set as his third world championship reign ended with a 3–0 defeat in the first round.

=== 2009–2016: Nine-dart finish and slide in rankings ===
Part was defeated in the first round of the 2009 World Championship, losing 3–0 to American Bill Davis – the second time in which Part has lost his first match in the World Championship, having won the title the previous year (he was knocked out by Mark Dudbridge in 2004 having won the title in 2003). Part was defeated by Kirk Shepherd in the second round of the 2010 World Championship in a repeat of the 2008 final, only recording a 76 average in a 4–1 loss. Part dropped down the rankings and did not appear in the 2010 Premier League.

In June 2010, Part came through a large field of players to win the PDC North American Darts Championship in Las Vegas. Part did not make the 2010 Grand Slam of Darts after Adrian Lewis surprisingly defeated Phil Taylor in the semi-finals of the 2010 World Grand Prix. Part was whitewashed 0–3 by Danish qualifier Per Laursen in the 2011 World Championship and almost went out of the top 32.

He won his first players championship since 2007 in February 2011 in Derby beating Mark Walsh 6–0 with 104.86 average. On the previous day he narrowly missed double 12 for a 9 dart finish. Part stated "he had nothing to lose" and that illness had stopped him reaching where he wanted to be at the World Championships. Part's form continued when he won another players championship in May 2011 in Austria by beating Denis Ovens 6–0 in the final, having earlier won against Phil Taylor 6–2. The win granted him qualification for all the major televised tournaments in 2011, which he did not do in 2010 except for the UK Open.

During the first round of the 2011 World Matchplay, Part hit a 9 Darter against Mark Webster and came from 7–1 down to within one leg at 9–8. He subsequently lost the match but hit a milestone in his darting career with his first ever televised perfect game.

He qualified for the World Grand Prix, in which he won his first round match against reigning World Champion Adrian Lewis. He lost in the last 16 against eventual finalist Brendan Dolan, 1–3.

At the 2012 World Championship he made it to the quarter-finals for the first time since his 2008 title. He dropped just three sets on his way to the last 8 by defeating John Henderson, Richie Burnett and Kevin Painter. He then competed in the World Championships against James Wade. Wade opened up a 3–1 set lead, before his form started to dip to coincide with Part scoring heavier and hitting more doubles to win 3 sets in a row. The players broke each other's throws twice in the deciding set to require a sudden-death leg, which Wade won. Part said afterwards that it was "the greatest game I've ever lost!".

Part represented Canada with Ken MacNeil in the 2012 PDC World Cup of Darts and together they were beaten 2–3 by England in the second round, having lost a sudden death leg.

Part won the first PDC North American pro tour event in July 2012, beating top American player Darin Young 6 legs to 1 in the final in Chicago.

Part nevertheless had one of the quietest seasons of his career, as he didn't qualify in any of the majors tournaments. However, he was invited to play at the Grand Slam of Darts in which he managed to win 2 out of 3 matches to qualify for the second round (despite a meagre average of 81 for his three-round robin matches). He eventually reached the quarter-finals stages. Defeating Brendan Dolan 10–6 in the last 16 before losing to Andy Hamilton 12–16.

Despite this season, he was ranked 26th at the World Championships and whitewashed Joe Cullen 3–0 in the first round, before being defeated by Terry Jenkins 1–4 in the second.

Part again represented Canada in the 2013 PDC World Cup of Darts, this time with Jeff Smith. With a win over Sweden and a loss over Scotland, they progressed to the second round in which they were beaten 5–2 by Mark Webster and Richie Burnett. However, bigger success came soon, as Part won the first European Tour event of 2013, the UK Masters. Wins over Kim Huybrechts, Gary Anderson, Mensur Suljović, Simon Whitlock and Adrian Lewis saw Part progress to the final where opponent Stuart Kellett was waiting. With a 6–4 win Part claimed his first PDC ranking title since 2011.

At the European Darts Trophy in Sindelfingen (Germany) Part reached the quarter-finals after defeating Vincent van der Voort, Robert Thornton and Ronnie Baxter. Dutchman Michael van Gerwen ended his chance to win a second successive European Tour event. At the seventh UK Open Qualifier in April, Part won seven games to reach the final which he lost 2–6 to Kim Huybrechts. He was beaten 4–9 in the fourth round of the 2013 UK Open by Andy Hamilton, having led 3–0.

He qualified for the European Championship and lost in the first round 4–6 to Kevin Painter, despite hitting a 170 checkout and having a dart at the bullseye for a second one to lead 5–4. He then qualified for the World Matchplay for the first time in two years. He faced James Wade in his first round match and, despite establishing a lead in the early stages, he lost 8–10.

He qualified for the World Grand Prix, but did not win his first round match, as he was facing Michael van Gerwen who managed to win the match with a 104 average.

His next televised championship was the Players Championship Finals. He earned enough money to be in the top 32 on the PDC Tour and played his first round match against Andy Hamilton. This was the first match where Part wore glasses. It worked for his scoring as he hit seventeen 100+ and three 180s, and he established a 5–1 lead against Hamilton, who wasn't in his best form, averaging under 70 in the five first legs. But Part hit only 13% of his doubles in the five legs he won and missed a total of 18 darts for the match when his opponent found form again to win the match 6–5 with a 158 checkout in the deciding leg.

He entered the 2014 World Championship as the 25th seed and played Mareno Michels in the first round, he won the first two sets of the match and then started to struggle with scoring and finishing. His opponent won the two next sets to force Part playing a deciding set. He won it 3–1 in legs and won the match with an 82 average. He then lost 0–4 to Wes Newton in the last 32. At the end of the season, he finished ranked 28th.

In the 2014 season, Part only reached two quarter finals out of a strings of Pro Tour and European Tour championships. He did not qualify for any televised ranking tournament. He almost went out of the Top 32 in the Order of Merit, having lost 10 places in more than a year, slipping from 21st to 31st. He still qualified for the 2015 World championships where he was beaten 2–3 by 22 years old newcomer Keegan Brown, despite Part's fightback from 0–2 to 2–2. He was still in the top 32 after the tournament, but after the 2015 UK Open, he left the top 32.

Part did not qualify for the 2016 World Championship. This was the first time Part did not qualify for the event after 22 consecutive years in the tournament.

=== 2017–2023: Hall of Fame, televised return, CDC and World Seniors Tour ===
In January 2017, Part was inducted into the PDC Hall of Fame. He was the fourteenth inductee and the first from outside of the United Kingdom – fitting with his World Championship victories. The award acknowledged his achievements, his contributions as a commentator and pundit, and gentlemanly conduct throughout his career. In the same month, he entered the PDC Qualifying School to gain a tour card having fallen out of the world's top 64. Part won through on the third day; beating Kirk Shepherd at the final stage in a rematch of the 2008 World Championship final. In March 2017, Part returned to Unicorn darts after switching to Cosmo darts, joining fellow World Champions for the company Gary Anderson, John Lowe and Bob Anderson. His success in Qualifying School did not transfer to his 2017 season, where he did not progress beyond the last 32 stage of a singles event, taking just £2,250 in prize money in the calendar year. His best showing of the year was at the World Cup of Darts, where he lost in the second round to the Austrian team with his partner, John Norman Jnr.

Competing in the six qualifiers for the 2018 UK Open, Part reached the last 32 stage of the fourth event. The £750 prize money for this was enough for him to qualify as one of the 128 players to take part in the televised stages of the tournament, his first since the 2015 UK Open three years previously. He beat two amateur qualifiers in the first two rounds of the tournament, and followed those wins up with wins over David Evans, Ron Meulenkamp and Mervyn King to reach his first televised quarter final since the 2012 Grand Slam of Darts, and his first quarter-final in any PDC event since the 2014 Austrian Darts Open. He lost at the quarter-final stage to Robert Owen. The £11,500 prize money he collected for this result is his highest earnings from a single event since the 2013 PDC UK Masters, also held at Butlin's Minehead. Part lost his tour card in 2019 after failing to retain it in that year's Q-School.

After losing his PDC Tour Card at the end of the 2018 season, Part unsuccessfully attempted to regain it at the 2019 PDC Qualifying School. He subsequently competed in the first eight events of the 2019 PDC Challenge Tour, reaching the last 16 of the third event before losing to Andy Hamilton. He earned £200 on the circuit that year. Despite speculation about his retirement, Part confirmed in December 2019 that he intended to return to Qualifying School in 2020 and continue his playing career.

Part remained active on the North American Championship Darts Circuit (CDC), having won the inaugural event in 2015 and added further tournament victories in 2017 and 2018. He also returned to the PDC Challenge Tour in 2022, with his best result coming at the ninth event, where he reached the last 16 before losing 3–5 to Jelle Klaasen.

In 2022, Part joined the newly established World Seniors Darts Tour. At the inaugural 2022 World Seniors Darts Championship, he was seeded directly into the second round, where he lost 1–3 in sets to John Walton, in his first televised match since 2018. At the 2022 World Seniors Darts Masters, held at Lakeside, Part recorded his first victory on the seniors circuit by defeating Paul Lim 4–0, before losing by the same scoreline to Phil Taylor. His appearance at the 2022 World Seniors Darts Matchplay ended in a first-round defeat to Peter Manley.

Part continued competing on the seniors circuit in 2023. At the 2023 World Seniors Darts Championship, he defeated Co Stompé in the first round before losing 2–3 to Darryl Fitton in the second. He also reached the quarter-finals of the 2023 World Seniors Darts Masters, defeating Kevin Painter before being eliminated by Robert Thornton. His campaign at the 2023 World Seniors Darts Matchplay ended with a first-round defeat to Phil Taylor.

=== 2024–2026: Continued competition and attempts to regain a Tour Card ===
In January 2024, Part entered PDC Qualifying School in another attempt to regain his professional Tour Card. He progressed to the Final Stage but was unsuccessful, finishing 79th on the UK Q-School Order of Merit. At the 2024 World Seniors Darts Championship, he lost 0–3 to Richie Howson in the first round. Later that year, Part also competed in the 2024 World Seniors Darts Matchplay, narrowly losing 8–10 to Robert Thornton in the opening round.

Part returned to the 2025 World Seniors Darts Championship, where he defeated Jim McEwan 3–2 in the first round. He then faced eventual champion Ross Montgomery in the second round, losing another closely contested match 2–3.

During the 2025 season, Part also made another appearance on the PDC Challenge Tour, competing in events 7–15. His best results were three appearances in the last 64, at events 10, 11 and 12. In August, Part was announced as an entrant for the 2025 WDF World Masters, having last competed in the tournament in 2002.

In January 2026, aged 59, Part once again entered PDC Qualifying School. He reached the last 32 on the final day of the First Stage, recording victories over Alexander Elia, James Waite and Darren McMahon before losing 3–5 to Ultan McDyer. His performance secured him the 47th and final qualifying position on the UK First Stage Order of Merit, earning him a place in the Final Stage. However, he failed to win a match in the Final Stage and again missed out on a Tour Card, finishing joint 121st in its Order of Merit.

Part enjoyed a notable run on the Championship Darts Circuit in June 2026, reaching the final of the DJD Darts Masters in Philadelphia. It was his first CDC final since 2018 and the sixth of his career on the circuit. He defeated David Cameron 6–3 in the quarter-finals and Glen Richard 7–3 in the semi-finals, before losing 3–7 to Leonard Gates in the final.

Alongside his continued participation in competitive darts, Part has remained active as a commentator and pundit for Sky Sports.

== Television commentary ==
In June 1994, BBC commentator Sid Waddell decided to leave the BBC to join Sky Sports. This left just Tony Green as the only darts commentator at the BBC. Part is considered to be one of the game's best "counters" or "spotters" (the ability to work out scoring shots or where the next dart may be thrown). This knowledge is essential to a darts commentator and contributed to Part being chosen by the BBC to join Green in the commentary box during the latter stages of the 1995 Embassy World Championship.

Part continued to commentate on the BDO World Championship even after he started playing in the rival PDC event shown on Sky Sports. He said: "The BDO weren't too thrilled but the BBC didn't care at all. They made sure I was back for them." Part commentated on the BDO World Championship for the BBC from 1995 to 2007. He also commentated on the BBC's coverage of the World Masters from 2001 to 2004, and again in 2006. He missed commentating on the 2005 World Masters because he was in Ireland preparing to play in the 2005 World Grand Prix, and missed commentating on the 2007 World Masters due to competing in the 2007 Grand Slam of Darts. Part then left the BBC commentary team.

In 2012, Part returned to commentary as he was employed by ESPN for the 2012 European Championship.

Part started commentating for Sky Sports at the 2013 World Matchplay, and has since become a regular member of Sky's commentary team.

== Personal life ==
Part attended Upper Canada College in Toronto before studying at the University of Toronto, where he studied Commerce and English but did not graduate. Prior to becoming a professional darts player, he managed a sports store.

In a 2003 interview, he described himself as a keen golfer and a fan of Martin Scorsese's movies. He has been noted as a player who did not drink heavily, at a time when darts was heavily associated with drinking.

== Career finals ==
=== BDO major finals: 1 (1 title) ===
Outcome	No.	Year	Championship	Opponent in the final	Score (Note: (l) = score in legs, (s) = score in sets.)
Winner	1.	1994	World Championship	(England) Bobby George	6–0 (s)

=== PDC major finals: 10 (3 titles) ===
Legend
World Championship (2–1)
World Matchplay (0–2)
World Grand Prix (0–2)
UK Open (0–1)
Las Vegas Desert Classic (1–1)

Outcome	No.	Year	Championship	Opponent in the final	Score
Runner-up	1.	2001	World Championship	Phil Taylor	0–7 (s)
Runner-up	2.	2002	World Matchplay	Phil Taylor	16–18 (l)
Runner-up	3.	2002	World Grand Prix	Phil Taylor	3–7 (s)
Winner	1.	2003	World Championship	Phil Taylor	7–6 (s)
Runner-up	4.	2003	Las Vegas Desert Classic	Peter Manley	12–16 (l)
Runner-up	5.	2003	World Grand Prix (2)	Phil Taylor	2–7 (s)
Runner-up	6.	2004	UK Open	Roland Scholten	6–11 (l)
Runner-up	7.	2005	World Matchplay (2)	Colin Lloyd	12–18 (l)
Winner	2.	2006	Las Vegas Desert Classic	Raymond van Barneveld	6–3 (s)
Winner	3.	2008	World Championship (2)	Kirk Shepherd	7–2 (s)

=== PDC European tour finals: (1 title) ===
Legend
Other (1–0)

Outcome	No.	Year	Championship	Opponent in the final	Score
Winner	1.	2013	UK Masters	Stuart Kellett	6–4 (l)

== World championship performances ==
=== BDO ===
- 1994: Winner (beat Bobby George 6–0)
- 1995: 2nd round (lost to Paul Williams 2–3)
- 1996: 2nd round (lost to Steve Beaton 0–3)
- 1997: 2nd round (lost to Roger Carter 1–3)

=== PDC ===
- 1998: Group Stage (beat Paul Lim 3–1, lost to Peter Evison 2–3)
- 1999: First round (lost to Alan Warriner-Little 0–3)
- 2000: Second round (lost to Dennis Smith 0–3)
- 2001: Runner-up (lost to Phil Taylor 0–7)
- 2002: Quarter-finals (lost to Phil Taylor 0–6)
- 2003: Winner (beat Phil Taylor 7–6)
- 2004: Third round (lost to Mark Dudbridge 3–4)
- 2005: Fourth round (lost to Mark Dudbridge 2–4)
- 2006: Third round (lost to Wayne Mardle 2–4)
- 2007: Second round (lost to Chris Mason 2–4)
- 2008: Winner (beat Kirk Shepherd 7–2)
- 2009: First round (lost to Bill Davis 0–3)
- 2010: Second round (lost to Kirk Shepherd 1–4)
- 2011: First round (lost to Per Laursen 0–3)
- 2012: Quarter-finals (lost to James Wade 4–5)
- 2013: Second round (lost to Terry Jenkins 1–4)
- 2014: Second round (lost to Wes Newton 0–4)
- 2015: First round (lost to Keegan Brown 2–3)

=== WSDT ===
- 2022: Second round (lost to John Walton 1–3)
- 2023: Second round (lost to Darryl Fitton 2–3)
- 2024: First round (lost to Richie Howson 0–3)
- 2025: Second round (lost to Ross Montgomery 2–3)

== Nine-dart finishes ==
John Part televised nine-dart finishes
Date	Opponent	Tournament	Method	Prize
16 July 2011	(Wales) Mark Webster	World Matchplay	3 x T20; 3 x T20; T20, T19, D12	£10,000

== Performance timeline ==
=== BDO ===
Tournament	1993	1994	1995	1996	1997	1998	1999	2000	2001	2002	2007
BDO Ranked televised events
BDO World Championship	DNQ	W	2R	2R	2R	PDC					
World Masters	3R	3R	4R	1R	4R	2R	2R	3R	2R	2R	DNP
World Darts Trophy	Not held									DNP	2R
International Darts League	Not held										RR

=== WSDT ===
Tournament	2022	2023	2024	2025
WSDT televised events
World Seniors Championship	2R	2R	1R	2R
World Seniors Masters	1R	QF	DNP	NH
World Seniors Matchplay	1R	1R	1R	NH

=== PDC ===
Tournament	1997	1998	1999	2000	2001	2002	2003	2004	2005	2006	2007	2008	2009	2010	2011		2012	2013	2014	2015	2016	2017	2018
PDC Ranked televised events
World Championship	BDO	RR	1R	2R	F	QF	W	3R	4R	3R	2R	W	1R	2R	1R		QF	2R	2R	1R	DNQ		
UK Open	Not held						5R	F	6R	5R	5R	5R	3R	3R	4R		3R	4R	2R	1R	DNQ		QF
World Matchplay	Prel.	1R	1R	1R	QF	F	2R	SF	F	2R	2R	2R	1R	DNQ	1R		DNQ	1R	DNQ				
World Grand Prix	NH	1R	RR	QF	QF	F	F	1R	1R	1R	SF	QF	1R	DNQ	2R		DNQ	1R	DNQ				
European Championship	Not held											1R	1R	DNQ	1R		DNQ	1R	DNQ				
Players Championship Finals	Not held												2R	DNQ	DNQ	1R	DNQ	1R	DNQ				
PDC Non-ranked televised events
Premier League Darts	Not held								6th	DNP		8th	6th	DNP									
World Cup	Not held													QF	NH		2R	2R	1R	1R	QF	2R	2R
Grand Slam	Not held										QF	2R	RR	DNQ	2R		QF	DNQ					
PDC Past major events
Las Vegas Desert Classic	Not held					QF	F	SF	SF	W	SF	1R	SF	Not held									
World Series of Darts	Not held									1R	Not held												
US Open	Not held										SF	2R	No longer a major		Not held								
Career statistics
Year-end ranking	-	-	6	7	7	2	2	4	11	18	11	4	4	32	27		24	25	30	53	86	158	97

==== PDC European Tour ====
Season	1	2	3	4	5	6	7	8	9	10	11	12	13
2012	ADO; 1R	GDC; 2R	EDO; 1R	GDM; 1R	DDM; 1R								
2013	UKM; W	EDT; QF	EDO; 2R	ADO; 1R	GDT; 2R	GDC; 1R	GDM; 1R	DDM; 1R					
2014	GDC; QF	DDM; 2R	DNQ	ADO; QF	Did not qualify								
2015	GDC; 1R	Did not qualify					DNP		DNQ				
2016	Did not qualify						Did not participate						
2017	DNP	DNQ	DNP			DNQ		DNP		Did not qualify			
2018	Did not qualify												

==== PDC Players Championships ====
Season	1	2	3	4	5	6	7	8	9	10	11	12	13	14	15	16	17	18	19	20	21	22	23	24	25	26	27	28	29	30	31	32	33	34	35	36	37
2003	BLA; F																																				
2004	BLA; QF	NEW; QF	DUB; 3R	ROT; 3R	DNP																																
2005	IOW; 3R	IOW; 2R	DNP	NEW; 4R	DUB; 3R	IRV; 1R	LIS; QF	LIS; Prel.																													
2006	DNP		HAY; 4R	BLA; 4R	NEW; 3R	DUB; 3R	IRV; 4R	LIS; 2R	LIS; 2R																												
2007	GIB; 3R	GIB; 4R	BAD; 4R	ANT; 1R	SCH; 4R	HEE; SF	HAY; 3R	HAY; W	LVE; 3R	BLA; QF	PEA; QF	DNP	CHI; 3R	NEW; 2R	DUB; 1R	IRV; 1R	DNP		LIS; QF	LIS; SF																	
2008	GIB; W	GIB; 4R	BRE; 1R	WIG; 2R	DNP		TEL; 3R	ANT; 2R	DNP	SCH; 4R	DNP		LVE; 3R	BLA; SF	DNP	KIT; 2R	Did not participate							DUB; 3R	DUB; 1R	Did not participate											
2009	BLA; 4R	Did not participate				IRV; 3R	DNP		COV; 1R	DNP		TAU; 4R	DNP	NEW; 1R	DNP	BAR; 1R	DIN; QF	DIN; 1R	LVE; SF	DNP	ONT; QF	ATL; 4R	SAL; 1R	SAL; 3R	DNP	DUB; 2R	DNP		NUL; 1R	IRV; 3R	IRV; 2R						
2010	GIB; Prel.	GIB; 1R	SWI; Prel.	DNP	GLA; 3R	GLA; 3R	WIG; 1R	CRA; 1R	BAR; 2R	DER; 1R	DNP	WIG; 4R	SAL; 2R	SAL; 2R	BAR; 1R	BAR; 3R	DNP	HAA; 2R	LVE; 2R	LVE; 1R	LVE; 1R	DNP			CRA; 1R	CRA; 3R	NUL; 2R	NUL; 2R	DUB; 1R	DUB; 2R	DNP			BAR; 1R	BAR; 1R	DER; 2R	DER; 2R
2011	HAL; 1R	HAL; 3R	DER; 2R	DER; W	CRA; 3R	CRA; 3R	VIE; W	VIE; QF	CRA; QF	CRA; 3R	BAR; QF	BAR; QF	NUL; 2R	NUL; 4R	ONT; W	ONT; QF	DER; F	DER; SF	DNP		DUB; 4R	DUB; 3R	Did not participate					CRA; 3R	CRA; QF	DNP							
2012	ALI; 2R	ALI; 3R	REA; 2R	REA; 4R	CRA; 1R	CRA; 1R	BIR; 3R	BIR; 3R	CRA; 4R	CRA; 4R	BAR; 4R	BAR; 3R	DUB; 2R	DUB; 1R	KIL; 1R	KIL; 3R	CRA; 1R	CRA; 3R	BAR; 1R	BAR; QF																	
2013	WIG; 2R	WIG; 1R	WIG; 2R	WIG; 3R	CRA; 3R	CRA; 1R	BAR; 1R	BAR; 2R	DUB; 3R	DUB; 3R	KIL; 3R	KIL; 3R	WIG; 3R	WIG; 2R	DNP																						
2014	BAR; 1R	BAR; 3R	CRA; 1R	CRA; 3R	WIG; 1R	WIG; 1R	WIG; 2R	WIG; 2R	CRA; 1R	CRA; 3R	COV; 3R	COV; 1R	CRA; 1R	CRA; 1R	DUB; 2R	DUB; 1R	CRA; 2R	CRA; 1R	COV; 1R	COV; 2R																	
2015	BAR; 1R	BAR; 1R	BAR; 1R	BAR; 1R	BAR; 1R	COV; 1R	COV; 2R	COV; 1R	CRA; 2R	CRA; 4R	BAR; 1R	BAR; 1R	DNP		BAR; 2R	BAR; 1R	DUB; 1R	DUB; 1R	COV; 1R	COV; 1R																	
2016	BAR; 2R	BAR; 1R	BAR; 1R	BAR; 1R	BAR; 2R	BAR; 1R	BAR; 1R	BAR; 1R	COV; 1R	Did not participate							DUB; 1R	DUB; 1R	BAR; 1R	BAR; 3R																	
2017	Did not participate				MIL; 2R	MIL; 1R	Did not participate				MIL; 1R	MIL; 1R	Did not participate				BAR; 2R	BAR; 1R	DUB; 1R	DUB; 3R	BAR; 1R	BAR; 1R															
2018	BAR; 1R	BAR; 1R	BAR; 2R	BAR; 2R	MIL; 2R	MIL; 1R	BAR; 1R	BAR; 1R	WIG; 1R	WIG; WD	MIL; 1R	MIL; 1R	WIG; 1R	WIG; 1R	DNP		BAR; 1R	BAR; 1R	DUB; 1R	DUB; 1R	DNP																

==== PDC Challenge Tour ====
Season	1	2	3	4	5	6	7	8	9	10	11	12	13	14	15	16	17	18	19	20	21	22	23	24	Prize money	Ranking
2019	WIG; L128	WIG; L128	WIG; L16	WIG; L256	WIG; L256	WIG; L256	WIG; L256	WIG; L256	Did not participate																£200	156th
2022	Did not participate					HIL; L128	HIL; L256	HIL; L256	HIL; L16	HIL; L256	Did not participate														£200	194th
2025	Did not participate						HIL; L128	HIL; L256	HIL; L256	HIL; L64	MIL; L64	MIL; L64	MIL; L128	MIL; L128	MIL; L128	Did not participate									£225	208th

Performance Table Legend
W	Won the tournament	F	Finalist	SF	Semifinalist	QF	Quarterfinalist	#R; RR; Prel.	Lost in # round Round-robin; Preliminary round	DQ	Disqualified
DNQ	Did not qualify	DNP	Did not participate	WD	Withdrew	NH	Tournament not held	#R; RR; Prel.	Lost in # round Round-robin; Preliminary round	NYF	Not yet founded
