= 2000 World Grand Prix (darts) =

Tournament information
- Dates: 25–29 October 2000
- Venue: Crosbie Cedars Hotel
- Location: Rosslare, County Wexford, Ireland
- Organisation(s): Professional Darts Corporation (PDC)
- Format: Sets "double in, double out"
- Prize fund: £60,000
- Winner's share: £15,000
- High checkout: 170 Steve Brown

Champion(s)
- Phil Taylor (ENG)

The 2000 World Grand Prix was the third staging of the World Grand Prix darts tournament, organised by the Professional Darts Corporation. It was the first World Grand Prix to take place in Ireland, being held at the Crosbie Cedars Hotel in Rosslare, County Wexford, from 25 to 29 October 2000.

Phil Taylor maintained his unbeaten record in the tournament, defeating Shayne Burgess 6–1 in the final.

== Prize money ==
Position (num. of players)		Prize money (Total: £70,000)
Winner	(1)	£15,000
Runner-Up	(1)	£7,500
Semi-finalists	(2)	£4,350
Quarter-finalists	(4)	£3,000
Second round losers	(8)	£1,850
First round losers	(8)	£1,500

== Seeds ==
1. (England) Phil Taylor
2. (England) Peter Manley
3. (England) Shayne Burgess
4. (England) Rod Harrington
5. (England) Dennis Priestley
6. (England) Alan Warriner
7. (Canada) John Part
8. (England) Keith Deller

== Results ==
First round (best of 5 sets); 25 October
(Northern Ireland) Mitchell Crooks 83.54	2
(England) Kevin Painter 80.06	3
(United States) Steve Brown 76.85	2
(England) Chris Mason 84.13	3
(Northern Ireland) Paul Watton 68.67	0
(England) Dennis Smith 86.76	3
(Scotland) Jamie Harvey 74.41	1
(England) Colin Lloyd 71.43	3
(England) Andy Jenkins 76.04	0
(England) Ronnie Baxter 87.30	3
(England) Dave Askew 71.32	2
(England) Mick Manning 73.47	3
(Netherlands) Roland Scholten 74.36	1
(Wales) Richie Burnett 84.37	3
(England) John Lowe 77.51	1
(England) Peter Evison 82.95	3

Second round (best of 5 sets); 26 October
1	(England) Phil Taylor 94.96	3
(England) Kevin Painter 80.09	2
8	(England) Keith Deller 82.22	0
(England) Chris Mason 89.57	3
5	(England) Dennis Priestley 86.33	3
(England) Dennis Smith 95.33	2
4	(England) Rod Harrington 80.00	2
(England) Colin Lloyd 81.59	3
2	(England) Peter Manley 84.88	3
(England) Ronnie Baxter 80.69	2
7	(Canada) John Part 86.91	3
(England) Mick Manning 84.40	2
6	(England) Alan Warriner 90.75	3
(Wales) Richie Burnett 80.68	0
3	(England) Shayne Burgess 83.41	3
(England) Peter Evison 74.18	0

Quarter-finals (best of 11 sets); 27 October
1	(England) Phil Taylor 94.92	6
(England) Chris Mason 82.32	1
5	(England) Dennis Priestley 82.39	6
(England) Colin Lloyd 77.65	4
2	(England) Peter Manley 86.94	6
7	(Canada) John Part 81.97	4
6	(England) Alan Warriner 88.51	5
3	(England) Shayne Burgess 84.88	6

Semi-finals (best of 11 sets); 28 October
1	(England) Phil Taylor 91.37	6
5	(England) Dennis Priestley 91.09	1
2	(England) Peter Manley 75.98	0
3	(England) Shayne Burgess 91.12	6

Final (best of 11 sets); 29 October
1	(England) Phil Taylor 91.33	6
3	(England) Shayne Burgess 81.48	1
