= 2008 US Open (darts) =

The 2008 US Open is the second year of a darts tournament, organized by the Professional Darts Corporation (PDC). It was played at the Mohegan Sun Casino Resort, Connecticut, USA between May 16 and May 18, 2008.

Phil Taylor successfully defended his title.

== Television coverage and format ==
The event was broadcast on Nuts TV in the UK from the last 16 onwards.

The tournament was open to PDPA members and citizens and Green Card holders from the US and Canada. The elimination tournament was played down to the last 16 on the Friday and the last 16 played off on Saturday. The quarter-finals onwards took place on Sunday.

In addition, the PDC also staged the $50,000 North American Darts Championship on the 16th and 17 May.

== Tournament Review ==
=== Friday 16th May ===
Five American players made it through to the last 16 as there were a series of shock results on the opening day of the event. The biggest shock was when Gary Mawson beat world number one and five-time former World Champion, Raymond van Barneveld in the last 32. Current World Champion, John Part went out in round two to Roger Carter who also progressed to the last 16. Bill Davis beat Tony Eccles to reach Saturday's main stage competition. David Fatum and Ray Carver completed the American line-up of five in the last 16.

World number four, Terry Jenkins also suffered a surprise defeat at the hands of Paul Lim, the man who achieved the first ever World Championship nine darter in 1990. World number seven, Andy Hamilton, was beaten in the third round by Buddy Lessig. Number three seed, James Wade withdrew from the event due to illness. Out of the top 8 seeds, only two, Phil Taylor and Roland Scholten, made it to the last 16.

=== Saturday 17th May ===
The fifth round action opened with David Fatum being the first player and first American to reach the quarter-finals, beating out fellow countryman Bill Davis. Davis however did save some face with a 164 checkout, the highest of the night. Roger Carter was another American player to lose out, to Chris Mason. Mark Dudbridge also put on an impressive display in beating Dave Honey in straight sets.

Veteran Dennis Priestley moved into the quarters, dropping only one leg against Adrian Gray. Phil Taylor continued his imposing form, averaging 107 against Colin Osborne, who did take a set out of 'The Power'. American Gary Mawson, who had earlier knocked out the number one seed Raymond van Barneveld, lost 3–1 to Blackpool's Ronnie Baxter, and Colin Lloyd also looked to be in menacing form, not dropping a leg against world number eight Roland Scholten. The biggest shock of the night came with America's Ray Carver beating Wayne Mardle 3–1 in a high quality match including a 131 checkout from Carver.

== Results ==
Total Prize Fund £126,000 (unchanged from 2007)

Fifth round losers £3,000
(United States)	Gary Mawson 93.18	1
(England)	Ronnie Baxter 90.33	3
(Netherlands)	Roland Scholten 83.77	0
(England)	Colin Lloyd 95.94	3
(United States)	David Fatum 86.14	3
(United States)	Bill Davis 76.74	0
(United States)	Roger Carter 85.79	1
(England)	Chris Mason 90.94	3
(England)	Phil Taylor 107.09	3
(England)	Colin Osborne 93.49	1
(United States)	Ray Carver 90.07	3
(England)	Wayne Mardle 94.43	1
(England)	Dave Honey 82.08	0
(England)	Mark Dudbridge 87.78	3
(England)	Adrian Gray 77.68	0
(England)	Dennis Priestley 90.18	3

Quarter-finals losers £4,000
(England)	Ronnie Baxter 95.17	0
(England)	Colin Lloyd 101.07	3
(United States)	David Fatum 84.69	3
(England)	Chris Mason 83.72	1
(England)	Phil Taylor 100.45	3
(United States)	Ray Carver 93.83	0
(England)	Mark Dudbridge 83.44	0
(England)	Dennis Priestley 92.34	3

Semi-finals losers £5,000
(England)	Colin Lloyd 83.82	3
(United States)	David Fatum 76.08	2
(England)	Phil Taylor 111.35	3
(England)	Dennis Priestley 103.00	0

Final runner up £7,500 winner £12,500
(England)	Colin Lloyd 91.48	0
(England)	Phil Taylor 96.86	3

Scores after player's names are three-dart averages (total points scored divided by darts thrown and multiplied by 3)

== Earlier rounds ==
=== Preliminary round ===
Jerry Hall 3–0 Kurt Tyson
Joe Chaney 3–0 Michael Mitchell

=== First round ===
Raymond van Barneveld 3–0 Christopher Russano Sean Smith 3–1 Mark Carter Taro Yachi 3–0 Kory Nichols Jerry Hall 3–0 Phil Sroka Steve Maish 3–0 Scott Henning Gary Mawson 3–0 Cornelius McLoughlin Robert Peterson 3–0 Ron Linstruth Shawn Brenneman 3–2 Martin Tremblay Denis Ovens 3–0 Joel Beal Kieran Leal 3–0 David Minasian Donnie Strode 3–0 Ron Parent Lar Thao 3–2 John Piepora Ronnie Baxter 3–1 Jerry van Loan Sebastian Gagnon 3–1 Doug Stacey Paul Bolduc 3–0 Jason Roker John Quantock 3–0 Michael Minero Jnr Roland Scholten 3–0 John Finnegan Tom Cocker 3–0 Jason Watt Robert Miske 3–0 Mark Neilson Sean Downs 3–2 James Jordan Wes Newton 3–0 Gordon Dixon David Walsh 3–2 Fred Kreuger Joseph Doolan 3–0 Kevin Lagos Garret Hammond 3–1 Wayne Budgen Colin Lloyd 3–0 Owen Shea Steve Brown 3–0 Jason Benjamin Terry Hayhurst 3–2 Jason Naert James K Horan 3–2 John Jacko John Kuczynski 3–2 Vincent van der Voort Daniel Beauregard 3–1 Luben Izon Jon Archer 3–0 Dave Fennell Ben Burton 3–0 Mike Maguire Terry Jenkins 3–1 Rory Orvis Paul Lim 3–0 Robert Race Stephen Panuncialman 3–0 Tim Lemieux Donald Suiter 3–1 TJ Jackowski Steve Beaton 3–0 Adam Sherlock Davis Snider 3–0 Darin Young Robert Given 3–0 Roland Hall David Fatum 3–2 Simon Craven Barrie Bates 3–0 Kenji Mayama Charles Healy 3–1 Lawrence Gallagher Tony Eccles 3–0 Rob Petelin Paul Cooper 3–0 Joe Davanti Mervyn King 3–2 Dieter Scutsch Garrett French 3–2 Brian Blankenhorn Scott Kirchner 3–1 Darren Starr Bill Davis 3–0 Thomas Pagliuca John Part 3-1 Tom Waterman Roger Carter 3–0 Richard Corless Isen Veljic 3-0 Matt Malone Colin Monk 3–0 Janel Pelletier Mark Walsh 3–0 Jeffrey Borland Paul Cockings 3–1 Roy Chad Brian Cyr 3–1 James Drury Tom Sawyer 3–0 Michael Parks Alan Tabern 3–0 Lee White Chris Thompson 3–0 Larry Butler Darren Johnson 3–0 Scott Pressey Riley Stockman 3–0 Jason Smith Chris Mason 3–0 William Penn Peter Wright 3–0 John Davis Tim O'Gorman 3–0 Anthony Eugenia Michael Brewer 3–0 Richie Sieferheld	Phil Taylor 3–0 Robert St Onge Scott Cummings 3–0 Jason Hill Kevin Dowling 3–0 Henry Heile John MaGowan 3–2 Joe Chaney Alan Warriner-Little 3–0 Thomas Watson Tony Thompson 3–1 Vasilious Gavrielatos Sean Moran 3–2 Michael Burns Brian Blake 3–0 Chris Leslie Kevin Painter 3–0 Bruce Graham Brian Jones 3–0 Jeffrey Stewart George Timpone 3–0 Alexander MacDougall Michael Rountree 3–2 Daniel Thibadeau Colin Osborne 3–0 Nick Dickson Dan Olson 3–0 Steve Hine Joselito Moises 3–0 Craig Akin Dave Ladley 3–0 Jared Gurman Andy Hamilton 3–0 Christopher Eberley Chris White 3–0 Brad Page Buddy Lessig 3–0 Pat Breithaupt Jim Widmayer 3–1 Robert Heckman Alex Roy 3–0 Bill Dewitt Keith Connor 3–2 David Hascup Stowe Buntz 3–0 Thomas J Bunnenberg Ray Carver 3–0 Jim Snook Wayne Mardle 3–1 Tom Curtin Martyn Turner 3–0 Lorne Heinrichs Frank Smith 3–0 Adrian W Lewis Richard Espinosa 3–0 Richard Hammond Andy Smith 3–1 Ross Snook Stephen Lore 3–1 Frank Lerue Pete Riehl 3–0 Irene Mangan David Marienthal 3–0 Darren Latham Adrian Lewis 3–2 Gerry Convery Scott Wollaston 3–0 Stacy Stevens Chester Mackenzie 3–0 Bobby Peters Dave Honey 3–0 Jeffrey Steinberg Mick McGowan 3–0 Danny Pike David Saba 3–2 Kenneth Johnson Dennis Smith 3–0 Barry Todd Yvonne Martin-Cowig Bye (Rick Wadlow withdrawn through illness) Peter Manley 3–1 Mark Schlesinger Timmy Nicoll 3–1 Raymond Knispel Jeff Marks 3–0 James Love Mark Lawrence 3–0 Dennis Sayre Mark Dudbridge 3–0 Bruce Robbins Matt Clark 3–0 Bill Anderson Dave Cameron 3–0 Sean Lodge Brad Wethington 3–1 Mark Prutchick Gerard Zuilkowski Bye (James Wade withdrawn through illness) Robert Baechler 3–0 Damien McKenna Dan Lauby 3–0 Bill Butler Robert Gargan 3–0 Matthew Courtney Adrian Gray 3–0 Cameron Paine Robert Watson-Lang 3–0 J Dwayne Heinrichs Jason Clark 3–1 Chris Linkous Jim Newman 3–1 Michael Garramone Dennis Priestley 3–0 Kevin Czipo Donny Joe 3–0 Thomas Healy Michael van Gerwen 3–0 Kevin McDine Ron Miller 3–0 Joseph Swick Andy Jenkins 3–0 Ron Colvard Jayson Barlow 3–1 Victor Dewild Robert Tafuri 3–1 Dave Watson Jelle Klaasen 3–0 Tim Grossman

=== Second round ===
Raymond van Barneveld 3–0 Sean Smith Jerry Hall 3–0 Taro Yachi Gary Mawson 3–2 Steve Maish Shawn Brenneman 3–0 Robert Peterson Denis Ovens 3–0 Kieran Leal Donnie Strode 3–0 Lar Thao Ronnie Baxter 3–0 Sebastian Gagnon Paul Bolduc 3–1 John Quantock Roland Scholten 3–0 Tom Cocker Robert Miske 3–2 Shaun Downs Wes Newton 3–0 David Walsh Garret Hammond 3–1 Joseph Doolan Colin Lloyd 3–2 Steve Brown James K Horan 3–1 Terry Hayhurst John Kuczynski 3–1 Daniel Beauregard Ben Burton 3–0 Jon Archer Paul Lim 3–2 Terry Jenkins Stephen Panuncialman 3–0 Donald Suiter Davis Snider 3–2 Steve Beaton David Fatum 3–2 Robert Given Barrie Bates 3–0 Charles Healy Tony Eccles 3–2 Paul Cooper Garrett French 3–2 Mervyn King Bill Davis 3–1 Scott Kirchner Roger Carter 3–2 John Part Isen Veljic 3-1 Colin Monk Mark Walsh 3–0 Paul Cockings Brian Cyr 3–2 Tom Sawyer Chris Thompson 3–2 Alan Tabern Darren Johnson 3–0 Riley Stockman Chris Mason 3–1 Peter Wright Michael Brewer 3–2 Tim O'Gorman	Phil Taylor 3–0 Scott Cummings Kevin Dowling 3–2 John MaGowan Alan Warriner-Little 3–0 Tony Thompson Brian Blake 3–0 Sean Moran Kevin Painter 3–0 Brian Jones George Timpone 3–0 Michael Rountree Colin Osborne 3–0 Dan Olson Dave Ladley 3–2 Joselito Moises Andy Hamilton 3–2 Chris White Buddy Lessig 3–1 Jim Widmayer Alex Roy 3–0 Keith Connor Ray Carver 3–0 Stowe Buntz Wayne Mardle 3–1 Martyn Turner Richard Espinosa 3–1 Frank Smith Andy Smith 3–0 Stephen Lore Pete Riehl 3–2 David Marienthal Adrian Lewis 3–1 Scott Wollaston Dave Honey 3–1 Chester Mackenzie Mick McGowan 3–0 David Saba Dennis Smith 3–0 Yvonne Martin-Cowig Peter Manley 3–1 Timmy Nicoll Mark Lawrence 3–1 Jeff Marks Mark Dudbridge 3–2 Matt Clark Brad Wethington 3–2 Dave Cameron Robert Baechler 3–0 Gerard Zuilkowski Dan Lauby 3–2 Robert Gargan Adrian Gray 3–1 Robert Watson-Lang Jason Clark 3–1 Jim Newman Dennis Priestley 3–1 Donny Joe Michael van Gerwen 3–0 Ron Miller Andy Jenkins 3–0 Jayson Barlow Jelle Klaasen 3–0 Robert Tafuri

=== Third round ===
Losers £1,000

Raymond van Barneveld 3–1 Jerry Hall Gary Mawson 3–1 Shawn Brenneman Denis Ovens 3–0 Donnie Strode Ronnie Baxter 3–0 Paul Bolduc Roland Scholten 3–1 Robert Miske Wes Newton 3–0 Garret Hammond Colin Lloyd 3–0 James K Horan Ben Burton 3–0 John Kuczynski Stephen Panuncialman 3–1 Paul Lim David Fatum 3–0 Davis Snider Tony Eccles 3–2 Barrie Bates Bill Davis 3–1 Garrett French Roger Carter 3–2 Isen Veljic Mark Walsh 3–0 Brian Cyr Chris Thompson 3–0 Darren Johnson Chris Mason 3–1 Michael Brewer	Phil Taylor 3–0 Kevin Dowling Alan Warriner-Little 3–2 Brian Blake Kevin Painter 3–0 George Timpone Colin Osborne 3–0 Dave Ladley Buddy Lessig 3–1 Andy Hamilton Ray Carver 3–2 Alex Roy Wayne Mardle 3–1 Richard Espinosa Andy Smith 3–0 Pete Riehl Dave Honey 3–2 Adrian Lewis Mick McGowan 3–1 Dennis Smith Peter Manley 3–0 Mark Lawrence Mark Dudbridge 3–1 Brad Wethington Dan Lauby 3–2 Robert Baechler Adrian Gray 3–2 Jason Clark Dennis Priestley 3–2 Michael van Gerwen Andy Jenkins 3–2 Jelle Klaasen

=== Fourth round ===
Losers £1,500

Gary Mawson 3–2 Raymond van Barneveld Ronnie Baxter 3–1 Denis Ovens Roland Scholten 3–1 Wes Newton Colin Lloyd 3–0 Ben Burton David Fatum 3–2 Stephen Panuncialman Bill Davis 3–2 Tony Eccles Roger Carter 3–0 Mark Walsh Chris Mason 3–1 Chris Thompson	Phil Taylor 3–0 Alan Warriner-Little Colin Osborne 3–1 Kevin Painter Ray Carver 3–1 Buddy Lessig Wayne Mardle 3–1 Andy Smith Dave Honey 3–1 Mick McGowan Mark Dudbridge 3–1 Peter Manley Adrian Gray 3–0 Dan Lauby Dennis Priestley 3–2 Andy Jenkins

== North American Darts Championship ==
For the first time the PDC staged a large tournament available only to citizens and Green Card holders from the US and Canada. The tournament was worth $50,000, with $15,000 going to the winner. It was played separately from the US Open on the 16th and 17 May, though players could enter for both tournaments. Darin Young, who had been knocked out in the first round of the US Open, emerged the victor.

On the first night the main shock was the defeat of World Champion and number one seed John Part, who was beaten by Buddy Lessig in the third round. The number two seed, Gerry Convery, also lost in the second round to Paul Lim. Leading American and third seed Ray Carver was defeated in the fifth round by Brad Wethington and John Kuczynski was beaten in the quarters by Brian Blake.

The second night saw the semi-finals and final being played out. Number eight seed Darin Young beat out Bill Davis in a close 7–5 game in the first semi-final, while Brad Wethington just beat Chris White in a 7–6 affair. The final followed suit. Wethington missed a dart to win the title before Young came back to win 8–7 and claim the title. Young said it was 'the biggest win of [his] career'. That moment was dubbed the 'most interesting' part of the Championship.
