= World Series of Darts (2006 tournament) =

Professional darts tournament, held May 2006

2006 World Series of Darts

Tournament information
- Dates: 19–21 May 2006
- Venue: Mohegan Sun Casino
- Location: Uncasville, Connecticut
- Country: United States
- Organisation(s): PDC
- Format: Legs
- Prize fund: $300,000
- Winner's share: $100,000
- High checkout: 161 John Part (CAN)

Champion(s)
- Phil Taylor (ENG)

The World Series of Darts was a professional darts tournament held from 19 to 21 May 2006 at the Mohegan Sun Casino, in Uncasville, Connecticut. It was the first and only edition of the competition, which was established by the Professional Darts Corporation (PDC) to capitalise on the potentially large North American market. It was the second of four PDC non-ranking events in the 2006 season and featured 32 players: 16 American entrants and 16 PDC players. There was a $1,000,000 bonus to the winner of the tournament if they were from the United States.

Phil Taylor, the 13-time world champion, defeated Adrian Lewis 13 legs to five (13–5) in the final, which was the latter's first appearance in the final of a major broadcast tournament. Before his match with Lewis, Taylor defeated qualifier Tim O'Gorman in the first round, Terry Jenkins in the second round, Mark Dudbridge in the quarter-finals and Ronnie Baxter in the semi-finals. John Part, the two-time world champion, made the tournament's highest checkout, a 161 in leg seven of his first round loss to qualifier and American number one John Kuczynski.

== Background and format ==
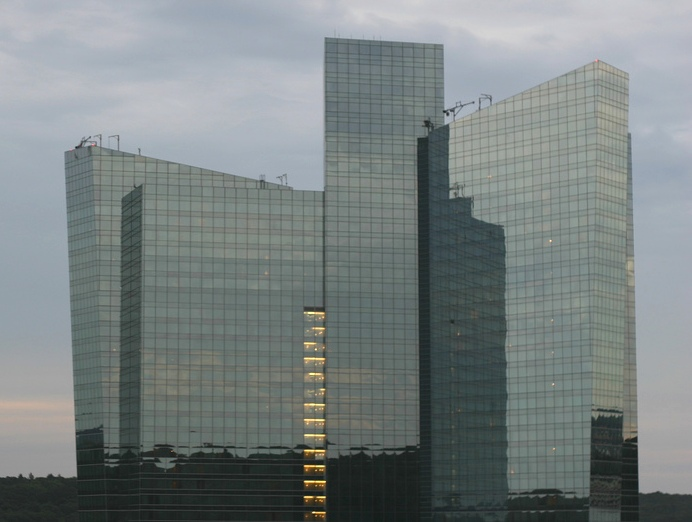
The Mohegan Sun Casino, where the tournament was held

The World Series of Darts was announced in The New York Times as a "made-for-television darts championship" in October 2005. It was launched in early 2006 by sports promoter and Professional Darts Corporation (PDC) chairperson Barry Hearn, and executive producer Michael Davies. This was done because North America was possibly a large market for darts. The tournament was held from 19 to 21 May 2006, in Uncasville, Connecticut, and was the second of four non-ranking PDC-sanctioned events in the 2006 season. It was the only edition of the competition, which became the US Open in 2007. The competition featured a 32-player main draw held at the Mohegan Sun Casino.

A total of 16 PDC players automatically qualified for the tournament based on their positions in the PDC world rankings following the 2006 PDC World Darts Championship. There were 16 seeds: Colin Lloyd, the world number one, was the first seed and Phil Taylor, the 13-time world champion, was seeded second. There were 12 places decided by a series of qualifying rounds held between 4 February and 19 April at various locations across the United States. The remaining 4 spots were decided in a competition which took place at the Mohegan Sun Resort on 19 May. The maximum number of legs played in a match increased from 11 in the first and second rounds to 17 in the quarter-finals and 21 in the semi-finals, leading up to the best-of-25 legs final. (Note: Each leg began with a maximum of 501 points and continued until one player subtracted their score to zero.)

The tournament was broadcast in the United States on ESPN and ESPN2 as a series of eight one-hour highlight programmes through July to September 2006. In the United Kingdom, Sky Sports broadcast a weekly highlights programme of the event from August to October.

=== Prize fund ===
The event had a total prize fund of $300,000 for all PDC entrants; a special $1,000,000 bonus was put up for an American champion because of British dominance in world darts. A PDC player would earn $100,000 for winning the event. The breakdown of prize money is shown below:

- US Winner: $1,000,000
- PDC Winner: $100,000
- Runner-up: $48,000
- Semi-final (×2): $20,000
- Quarter-final (×4): $10,000
- Second-round (×8): $5,000
- First round (×16): $2,000
- Total: $300,000

=== Qualification ===
Entrants in each of the 12 regional qualifying rounds had to be aged 21 or over and be a citizen of the United States. The qualifying events were staged as single-elimination tournaments and featured a total prize fund of $9,600; $800 was available for each competition. All fixtures was best-of-seven legs with the players throwing for the bullseye ring to determine who would play first should a match enter a seventh, game-ending leg. There were four seeds given to the four highest-ranked participants at each competition, based on the Bull's Eye News Pro Rankings.

The two-stage Mohegan Sun tournament "Friday Night Madness" was held late on 19 May. Players had to be citizens of the United States and aged 21 or over; those who were in a previous qualifier could enter. A total of 256 competitors played within a 32-board setup in the arena. The first stage saw players attempt to achieve as low a score as possible in the fewest number of throws. The 16 players with the lowest overall scores including tiebreaks advanced to stage two, which was a single-elimination, bracket system and best-of-seven leg matches with no seeds. The four winners of stage two qualified for the main draw.

Qualifier results
Tournament	Date of tournament	Winner
Virginia Beach Qualifier	4 February 2006	Isen Veljic (Hong Kong)
Atlanta Qualifier	5 February 2006	Roger Carter (USA)
New Jersey Qualifier	11 February 2006	Jim Widmayer (USA)
Philadelphia Qualifier	4 March 2006	Jim Watkins (USA)
Chicago Qualifier	5 March 2006	David DePriest (USA)
Washington, D.C. Qualifier	11 March 2006	Joe Chaney (USA)
Las Vegas Qualifier	12 March 2006	John Kuczynski (USA)
Connecticut Qualifier	18 March 2006	Tim Grossman (USA)
Houston Qualifier	19 March 2006	Joe Slivan (USA)
Marlborough Qualifier	1 April 2006	Ray Carver (USA)
Ronkonkoma Qualifier	2 April 2006	Joe Efter (USA)
Somerville Qualifier	22 April 2006	Tom Curtin (USA)
Friday Night Madness	19 May 2006	Bill Davis (USA)
Friday Night Madness	19 May 2006	Tim O'Gorman (USA)
Friday Night Madness	19 May 2006	Jeff Russell (USA)
Friday Night Madness	19 May 2006	Brad Wethington (USA)

== Tournament summary ==
=== Round 1 ===
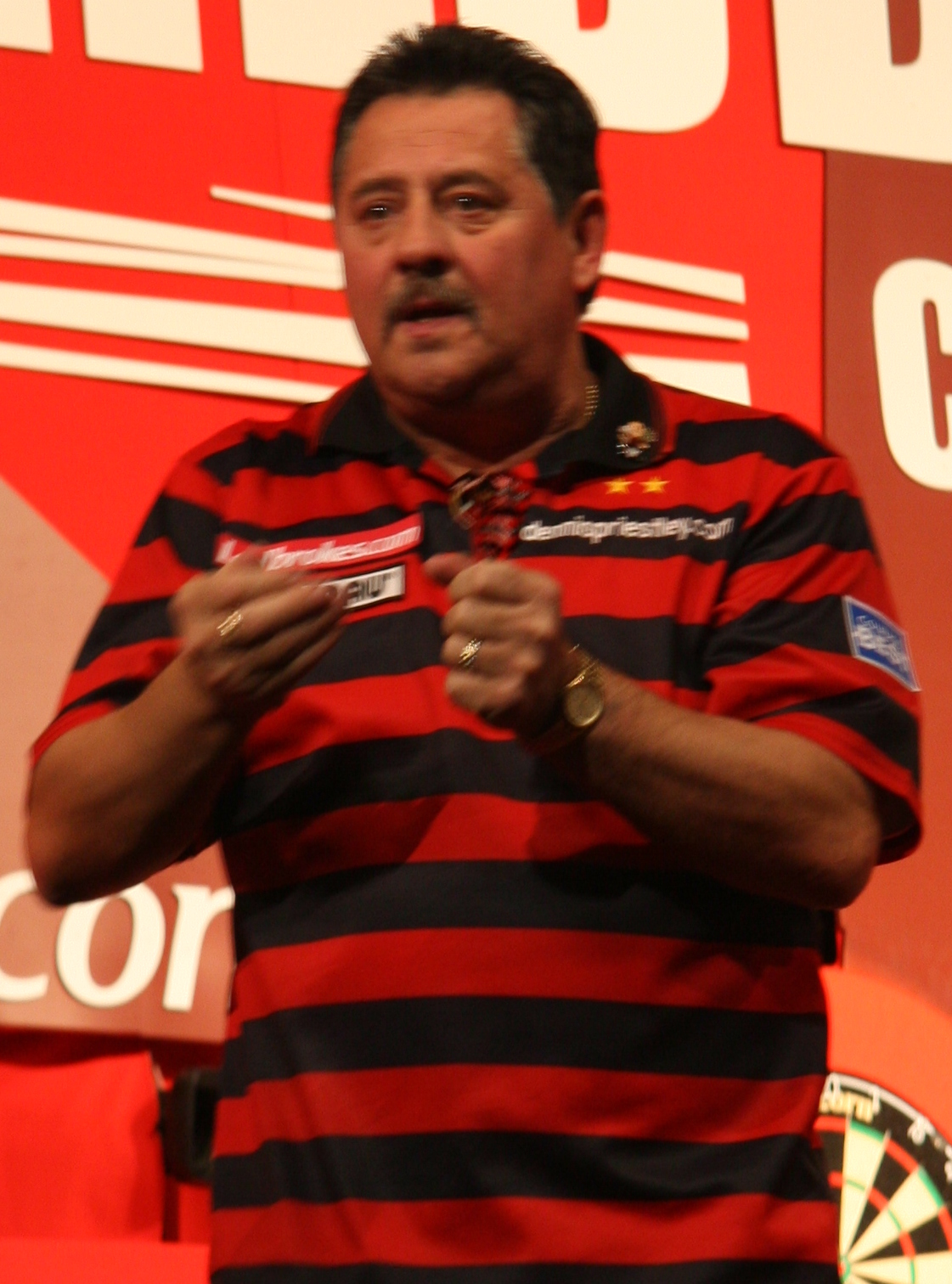
Dennis Priestley (pictured in 2007) reached the semi-finals of the tournament.

The draw for the first round of the championship was conducted by tournament director Tommy Cox as well as Lloyd and Taylor on 27 April. The first round of the competition, in which 32 players participated, took place on 20 May. Lloyd won 6–2 over Isen Veljic on the double 10 ring after losing the first leg to Veljic. Adrian Lewis averaged 81.98 points over three throws in his 6–0 whitewash of Jim Widmayer before fellow qualifier Tom Curtin achieved a 95 checkout in his 6–1 loss to Andy Jenkins. The game between Denis Ovens and Bill Davis began with both players sharing the opening two legs. Ovens took the following three legs before Davis drew to within one leg behind at 5–4. Ovens defeated Davis 6–4 on the double five ring on his final throw. Peter Manley moved 3–1 ahead before his opponent Ray Carver went 4–3 behind. Manley took the following two legs without response to win 6–3. Mark Walsh, the 2005 UK Open finalist, led Friday Night Madness qualifier Jeff Russell 4–0, before his opponent made checkouts of 54 and 121 to go 4–3 behind. The next two legs were shared before Walsh made a 115 checkout to defeat Russell 6–4.

Roland Scholten produced checkouts of 91 and 76 and a finish on the double 20 ring to lead Roger Carter 3–0. Carter won leg four on the double 16 ring before Scholten took three legs in succession for a 6–1 victory. Dennis Priestley, a two-time world champion, beat Joe Efter 6–1 with five legs in a row including a 110 checkout in leg two; Efter took leg six on the double 20 ring. Tim O'Gorman lost 6–2 to Taylor, who achieved a three-dart average of 96.05, before Terry Jenkins led Tim Grossman 3–1 and overcame a mid-game challenge from the latter to win the match 6–4 on the double 20 ring. World number six Kevin Painter defeated World Championship and World Matchplay entrant Jim Watkins 6–3. Leading 3–1, the fifth and six legs were shared before Painter claimed three successive legs to win the match. Mark Dudbridge, a former World Championship finalist, made checkouts of 101 and 66 and a finish on the double 20 ring to whitewash Joe Slivan 6–0.

Wayne Mardle, the number six seed, beat Dave DePriest 6–3. Mardle won the first two legs without reply before DePriest took legs three and four to level at 2–2. Mardle took three legs in succession and DePriest finished on the double 8 ring in leg eight. Mardle completed the win on the double 4 ring in leg nine. John Kuczynski, the United States number one, was the only American to qualify for the next round with a 6–5 win over John Part, the two-time world champion. The first two legs were shared before Part led 2–1 and then Kuczynski 4–2, which included an event-high 161 checkout from Part in leg seven. Both players took the match to an 11th leg that Kuczynski won on his second throw at the double 20 ring. World number three Ronnie Baxter and Brad Wethington exchanged the first two legs of their match before Baxter won five legs in succession for a 6–1 victory, which included a 104 checkout in leg four. The final first round match saw Alan Warriner-Little whitewash Joe Chaney 6–0.

=== Round 2 ===
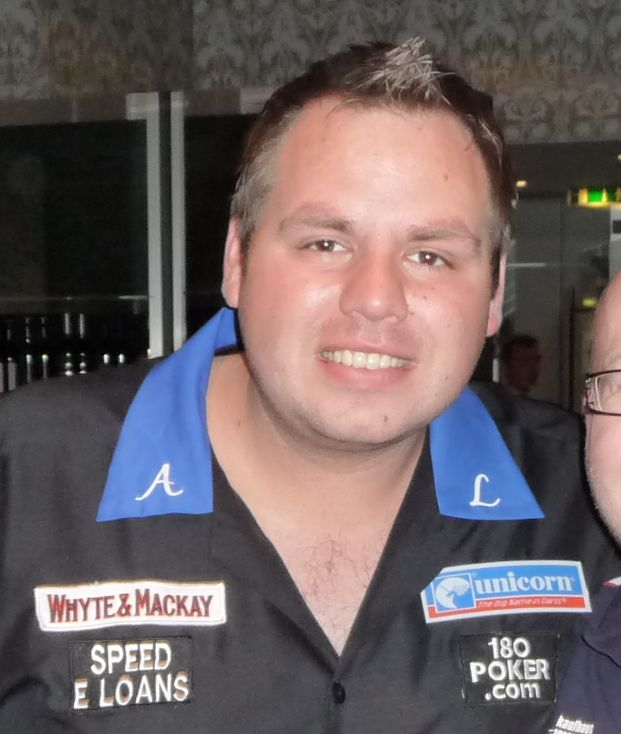
Adrian Lewis (pictured in 2011) qualified for the first major broadcast final of his career at the tournament.

The second round was held from 20 to 21 May; because of time constraints, four-second round matches were staged on the evening of 20 May. Lewis defeated Lloyd 6–5 in a match that went to a final leg decider. Lewis won leg one before Lloyd took two in a row for the lead. After a short interval to check the air conditioning, Lewis took a 5–3 lead before the game went to 5–5 and Lewis won it on the double 12 ring. Ovens came from 3–1 behind Jenkins to tie the match at 3–3. Jenkins clinched leg seven before Ovens took three legs in a row to win 6–4 on a 56 checkout achieved in two throws. Manley led Walsh 5–1 on four finishes on the double 20 ring and a 116 checkout in leg five. Walsh achieved a Shanghai (a 120 checkout) to claim leg seven after Manley failed five times to secure the win. Manley hit the double 10 ring on his second throw in leg seven to win 6–2. Priestley took the first three legs and Scholten the fourth. The game went to 5–3 before Scholten won leg nine on the double 20 ring. Priestley secured a 6–4 win in leg ten on the double 2 ring.

Taylor won the first three legs of his game against Jenkins before the latter took three of the next four. He took the eighth leg on a checkout of 76 and won the match 6–3 in 11 throws in leg nine. Dudbridge defeated Painter 6–5 in a match that concluded with a final leg decider. Painter took the first two legs, which included a 107 checkout in the second. The following three legs were shared before Dudbridge came from 4–3 down to tie in leg eight. Dudbridge took the ninth leg and Painter the tenth on the double 16 ring. The final leg saw Dudbridge win on a 64 checkout completed on the double 8 ring. Mardle led Kuczynski 4–1 before the latter completed a 119 checkout on the bullseye ring to be two legs behind. The seventh leg was won by Mardle and the eighth by Kuczynski on the double 20 ring. Mardle secured leg nine for a 6–3 victory and eliminated the last American player in the competition. The final second round match saw Baxter defeat Warriner-Little 6–4.

=== Quarter-finals ===
All four quarter-finals were played as the best-of-17 legs on 21 May. Lewis and Ovens played the first quarter-final. Ovens led 5–4 as Lewis achieved checkouts of 120, 84 and 74. He claimed leg 11 to put himself 6–5 in front before Lewis took the lead with a 75 checkout in the 13th leg after the former twice failed to finish on the double 16 ring. Lewis finished on the double 20 ring and achieved a 108 checkout completed on the double 18 ring to win 9–6. Manley and Priestley were in the second quarter-final. Priestley led 6–5 by winning four legs in succession before Manley achieved a finish on the double 10 ring to tie the match after Priestley failed to hit a double ring. Priestley retook the lead on a 124 checkout achieved on the bullseye ring in leg 13 before Manley again tied by hitting the double 20 ring after Priestley failed to strike a double ring. Priestley followed up by twice hitting the double 20 ring over the following two legs to defeat Manley 9–7.

The third quarter-final was contested between Dudbridge and Taylor. Trailing 2–1, Dudbridge produced checkouts of 126 and 64 to lead 3–2 before Taylor claimed the following five legs without reply on checkouts of 73, 99 and 88 to lead 7–3. Dudbridge reduced Taylor's lead to one leg before the latter won legs 14 and 15 to defeat Dudbridge 9–6. The last quarter-final was played by Baxter and Mardle. Baxter appeared set for a comfortable victory as he led 7–1 over Mardle with a finish on the double 20 ring and a 97 checkout entering the interval. Mardle took leg nine with a finish on the double 20 ring and the 10th with a 156 checkout. He won the next two to go 7–5 behind before failing on four occasions to win leg 13, which Baxter took. Baxter failed to win the match in the 14th leg, allowing Mardle to finish on the double 6 ring. The next leg saw Baxter complete a checkout of 121 on the double 18 ring to win 9–6.

=== Semi-finals ===
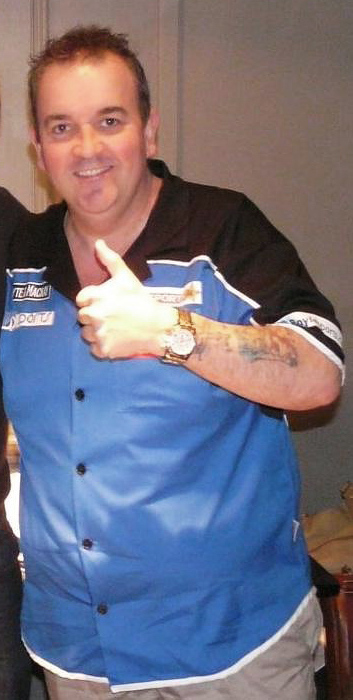
Phil Taylor (pictured in 2009) won the tournament, defeating Lewis in the final.

Both of the semi-finals on 21 May were best-of-21 legs. Lewis and Priestley played the first semi-final. Lewis won the first three legs on a 93 checkout in the first and finishes of 11 and 12 throws in the second and third. Priestley took leg four on the double 8 ring before Lewis went 5–1 ahead and then averaging almost 104 points with a 58 per cent finishing record on the double rings in the next three legs to lead 9–1 at the interval. Lewis' average fell to 98.72 in the next two legs to beat Priestley 11–1 and qualify for the first major broadcast final of his career.

The second semi-final was between Baxter and Taylor. Both players shared the opening two legs before Taylor achieved a checkout of 125 in the third leg and a finish on the double 12 leg in the fourth to lead Baxter 3–1. Checkouts of 69 and 65 gave Baxter the following two legs to equalise at 3–3. The next two legs were shared before Taylor won three in a row to go 7–4 ahead. Baxter claimed leg 12 on a 90 checkout finished on the bullseye ring before Taylor took the next four legs without response to win the match 11–5 on a 160 checkout and a final spot.

=== Final ===
The best-of-25 legs final between Lewis and Taylor took place on the same day. Taylor took the first leg on a 126 checkout and the following four to lead 5–0. Lewis took legs six and seven before Taylor won three legs in succession to increase his lead to 8–2. A checkout of 74 completed on the bullseye ring won Lewis leg 11 and Taylor took the 12th with a 158 checkout. Taylor moved further ahead with a finish on the double 16 ring in the 13th leg before Lewis struck the double 4 ring in leg 14. Taylor claimed two more legs before Lewis won leg 17 on the double 4 ring after Taylor twice failed to hit the double 12 ring. Taylor completed a 78 checkout on the double 10 ring to win the match 13–5.

Taylor achieved a three-dart average of 102.72 and earned $100,000 prize money for winning the competition. He commented on the win: "I’m thrilled to have won this. It was hard for both me and Adrian in the final because we’re very close, and he played brilliantly. I knew I couldn’t let him in and I had to be better than anything he threw at me." Lewis said of his loss to Taylor: "I was looking forward to the final but it was hard to concentrate because it was Phil. But I'll learn from this and I'm confident I can get a different result the next time we meet."

== Main draw ==
Numbers given to the left of players' names show the seedings for the top 16 players in the tournament. The sixteen qualifiers are indicated by (US1/FMN1). The figures in brackets to the right of a competitor's name state their three-dart averages in a match. Players in bold denote match winners of the main draw.

First round Best of 11 legs
1	**Colin Lloyd** (ENG) 87.25	**6**
US1	Isen Veljic (Hong Kong) 81.00	2
16	**Adrian Lewis** (ENG) 81.98	**6**
US3	Jim Widmayer (USA) 73.57	0
8	**Andy Jenkins** (ENG) 88.81	**6**
US12	Tom Curtin (USA) 72.24	1
9	**Denis Ovens** (ENG) 88.03	**6**
FNM2	Bill Davis (USA) 80.25	4
5	**Peter Manley** (ENG) 91.28	**6**
US10	Ray Carver (USA) 84.42	3
12	**Mark Walsh** (ENG) 83.77	**6**
FNM1	Jeff Russell (USA) 85.13	4
4	**Roland Scholten** (NED) 91.24	**6**
US2	Roger Carter (USA) 81.08	1
13	**Dennis Priestley** (ENG) 82.75	**6**
US11	Joe Efter (USA) 72.91	1
2	**Phil Taylor** (ENG) 96.05	**6**
FNM3	Tim O'Gorman (USA) 77.93	2
15	**Terry Jenkins** (ENG) 80.00	**6**
US8	Tim Grossman (USA) 70.66	4
7	**Kevin Painter** (ENG) 77.42	**6**
US4	Jim Watkins (USA) 72.62	3
10	**Mark Dudbridge** (ENG) 92.97	**6**
US9	Joe Slivan (USA) 73.45	0
6	**Wayne Mardle** (ENG) 89.90	**6**
US5	David DePriest (USA) 86.75	3
11	John Part (CAN) 89.08	5
US7	**John Kuczynski** (USA) 86.11	**6**
3	**Ronnie Baxter** (ENG) 84.36	**6**
FNM4	Brad Wethington (USA) 73.98	1
14	**Alan Warriner-Little** (ENG) 87.55	**6**
US6	Joe Chaney (USA) 69.65	0

Second round Best of 11 legs
1	(England) Colin Lloyd 89.25	5
16	(England) **Adrian Lewis** 93.21	**6**
8	(England) Andy Jenkins 84.32	4
9	(England) **Denis Ovens** 89.66	**6**
5	(England) **Peter Manley** 83.10	**6**
12	(England) Mark Walsh 69.35	2
4	(Netherlands) Roland Scholten 97.39	4
13	(England) **Dennis Priestley** 96.21	**6**
2	(England) **Phil Taylor** 104.88	**6**
15	(England) Terry Jenkins 99.59	3
7	(England) Kevin Painter 89.86	5
10	(England) **Mark Dudbridge** 97.19	**6**
6	(England) **Wayne Mardle** 93.44	**6**
US7	(United States) John Kuczynski 89.65	3
3	(England) **Ronnie Baxter** 92.02	**6**
14	(England) Alan Warriner-Little 88.67	4

Quarter-finals; Best of 17 legs
16	(England) **Adrian Lewis** 89.03	**9**
9	(England) Dennis Ovens 86.92	6
5	(England) Peter Manley 88.03	7
13	(England) **Dennis Priestley** 89.94	**9**
2	(England) **Phil Taylor** 105.46	**9**
10	(England) Mark Dudbridge 94.71	6
6	(England) Wayne Mardle 86.20	6
3	(England) **Ronnie Baxter** 94.06	**9**

Semi-finals; Best of 21 legs
16	(England) **Adrian Lewis** 98.72	**11**
13	(England) Dennis Priestley 82.97	1
2	(England) **Phil Taylor** 101.45	**11**
3	(England) Ronnie Baxter 94.81	5

Final; Best of 25 legs
16	(England) Adrian Lewis 93.06	5
2	(England) **Phil Taylor** 102.47	**13**
