= Colin Lloyd =

English darts player (born 1973)

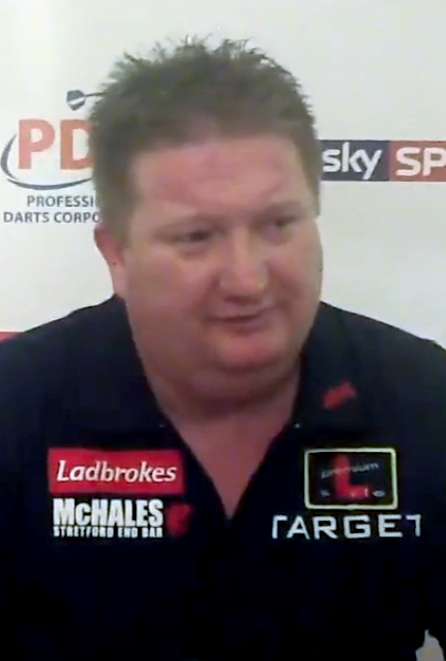
- Lloyd in 2011

Personal information
- Full name: Colin Edward Lloyd
- Nickname: "Jaws"
- Born: 7 August 1973 (age 53) Colchester, Essex, England

Sport
- Sport: Darts
- Playing since: 1985
- Darts: 18g Red Dragon
- Laterality: Right-handed
- Walk-on music: "Monster" by The Automatic

Organisation (see split in darts)
- PDC: 1999–2018

WDF major events – best performances
- World Masters: Last 64: 2001
- World Trophy: Quarter-final: 2006
- Int. Darts League: Runner-up: 2006

PDC premier events – best performances
- World Championship: Semi-final: 2002
- World Matchplay: Winner (1): 2005
- World Grand Prix: Winner (1): 2004
- UK Open: Semi-final: 2007
- Grand Slam: Last 16: 2007, 2009, 2010
- European Championship: Semi-final: 2010
- Premier League: Runner-up: 2005
- Championship League: Runner-up: 2008
- Desert Classic: Semi-final: 2003
- US Open/WSoD: Runner-up: 2008
- PC Finals: Quarter-final: 2009, 2010, 2011

Other tournament wins
- Years
Antwerp Open	2002, 2003, 2004
Bob Anderson Classic	2005
Irish Masters	2006
Le Skratch Montreal Open	2004
Open Holland	2004
Sunparks Masters	2004
Vauxhall Autumn Pro	2005
Vauxhall Spring Pro	2003, 2005
West Tyrone Open	2004, 2005
Players Championships (x10)
Players Championship (Atlanta)	2009
Players Championship (Chicago)	2008
Players Championship (Crawley)	2010, 2012
Players Championship (Dublin)	2004
Players Championship (Gibraltar)	2010
Players Championship (Hayling Island)	2006
Players Championship (Isle of Wight)	2005
Players Championship (Lisse)	2006
Players Championship (Ontario)	2010
UK Open Regionals/Qualifiers (x5)
Regional Final (Ireland)	2005
Regional Final (North East England)	2009
Regional Final (South West England)	2008
Regional Final (Southern England)	2008
UK Open Qualifier	2010

Other achievements
- Nine dart finish – Irish Masters 2006 (non-televised)
- Updated on 17 February 2008

Colin Edward Lloyd (born 7 August 1973), nicknamed "Jaws", is an English former professional darts player. He formerly competed in Professional Darts Corporation events, where he was ranked world number one from April 2005 to January 2007 (except for March–May 2006). He won two major televised titles – the 2004 World Grand Prix and the 2005 World Matchplay.

== Early life ==
Lloyd started playing darts as a schoolboy, representing Essex in the youth leagues at 13 before becoming a county player at 16. He worked as a builder before pursuing darts full time.

== PDC career ==
=== 1999–2004 ===
Lloyd broke onto the scene in 1999, making his TV debut the same year, In the first round he beating Scott Cummings 10–8, thrashing Alan Warriner 13–2 in the second round and the quarter-finals losing to Peter Manley 16–8 of the 1999 PDC World Matchplay. His World Championship debut came in 2000 – but he lost in the first round to Shayne Burgess. After another first round loss at the 2001 World Championships, his major breakthrough was in the 2002 PDC World Championship, where he reached the semi-finals, losing to Peter Manley 6–4. He had beaten Alex Roy, Warriner and Richie Burnett to reach the semi-finals that established him as one of the top players on the PDC circuit.

=== 2004–2006 ===
His long-awaited first major title came in the 2004 World Grand Prix, where he beat Warriner in the final. His success in the non-televised PDC Pro Tour events saw his world ranking continue to rise. By April 2005 he had reached world number one – a position he held (with a brief interruption in June 2006) for almost two years. Soon after becoming World Number One he added the 2005 World Matchplay title in Blackpool, beating John Part in the final, hitting 15 180s and ending the match on a maximum 170 checkout. He also reached the final of the 2005 World Grand Prix before losing 1–7 to Phil Taylor. This good form made him second favourite in the 2006 World Championship, only behind Taylor in terms of odds. Unfortunately for Lloyd, he was knocked out in the first round by qualifier Gary Welding, having led 2–0 in the best-of-five match. He reached the final of the International Darts League in the Netherlands in May 2006, losing to Raymond van Barneveld.

=== 2006–2012 ===
A heavy 2–11 defeat to Taylor at the 2006 UK Open saw his form in televised events dip dramatically. He lost in the first round of the 2006 Las Vegas Desert Classic to Chris Mason, to Steve Maish (despite a ten-dart leg where he was two darts away from a nine dart finish) at the 2006 World Matchplay and to Bob Anderson in the first round of the World Grand Prix. He lost his world number one ranking after a second round loss to eventual world champion van Barneveld at the 2007 PDC World Championship. He had led 3–0 in sets, failed with four match darts, and eventually lost 3–4.

Lloyd lost in the first round of the 2007 US Open to Jim Widmayer before showing some improvement with a run to the semi-finals of the 2007 UK Open. But he continued to lose ranking places as his good results from the two-year ranking period were replaced with further first round losses to Wes Newton at the 2007 Las Vegas Desert Classic and to Mervyn King at the 2007 World Matchplay.

He went into the 2008 World Championship ranked 12th in the world, having been number one just twelve months previously. He missed a dart at bullseye to win his first round match with Jan van der Rassel and then lost 2–3 (6–4 in legs in the final set). Lloyd's poor form at the 2009 World Championship continued as he lost in straight sets to the Netherlands' Jelle Klaasen in the first round. After winning his first round match at the 2009 World Matchplay against Wayne Jones, Lloyd announced that he had just recovered from swine flu and had been placed in isolation for five days.

Whilst playing Andree Welge in the 2011 PDC World Darts Championship first round, Lloyd punched the dart board out of frustration from letting slip a 2–0 lead to be all square at 2–2. Despite this, he eventually won the match 3–2 with a 116 out shot, and after the match said that he regretted what he did and said it was born out of pure frustration.

=== 2012–2015 ===
He comfortably made it to the last 16 of the 2012 World Championship by beating Darin Young and Scott Rand, 3–1 and 4–1 respectively. However, he struggled against world number four Gary Anderson in the next round, losing 1–4 as his opponent averaged 100. In April, Lloyd dropped out of the world's top 16 for the first time in over a decade and will need to qualify for the upcoming major events if he does not regain his place. In his next major event, the UK Open, Lloyd posted an encouraging result by defeating reigning champion James Wade 9–5, but then lost to world number 48 Joe Cullen 8–9 in the last 32. Lloyd hit a nine-dart finish in the first round of the European Tour Event 2 during a 6–5 win over Alex Roy. In July, he won the tenth Players Championship of the year, his first ranking title in almost 2 years. He beat Andy Hamilton 6–5 in the final and briefly returned to the top 16. He was ranked 17th at the cut-off point before the World Matchplay, but still qualified due to his position on the ProTour Order of Merit. Lloyd faced Mark Webster in the first round and was defeated 6–10. After all 33 ProTour events of 2012 had been played, Lloyd was 16th on the Order of Merit, which qualified him for the Players Championship Finals where he was beaten by Peter Wright 5–6 in the first round, after being 5–3 ahead.

Lloyd overcame Darin Young and Mark Webster to face Michael van Gerwen in the last 16 of the 2013 World Championship, and was beaten 4–1. He lost 9–8 to Brendan Dolan in the third round of the UK Open. Lloyd lost each of the five opening legs to Van Gerwen in the first round of the World Matchplay but made a fightback to trail just 7–6 before being eliminated 10–7. Lloyd's best result of 2013 was at the Austrian Darts Open where he beat the likes of Andy Hamilton (6–0) and Wes Newton (6–4) to reach the semi-finals and another meeting with Van Gerwen with Lloyd losing 6–2.

He twice came from a set down to level his first round match at 2–2 in the 2014 World Championship against Beau Anderson. Lloyd then missed 11 darts in the final set to break throw as all ten legs went with throw to send the match into a sudden-death leg which Anderson won to eliminate Lloyd. Lloyd missed out on playing in the UK Open for the first time in the tournament's history this year as he only entered three of the six qualifying events and failed to advance beyond the last 64 in any of them. Lloyd also failed to qualify for both the World Matchplay and World Grand Prix for the first time in 2014. He could not get past the last 64 of any event he entered during the season. Lloyd failed to qualify for the 2015 World Championship as he was 35th on the Order of Merit before the event, outside of the top 32 who automatically earn their places, and was not successful via any other method of qualification; it marked the first World Championship since 1999 to not feature Lloyd, and he vowed to retire if his poor form continued into 2015, saying "I'm not going to say I'm finished yet, because I think I'm far from finished. But this is the worst year I've ever had. It's been an abysmal year. If I get six months into next year and feel I'm not competing at the level I want to, then that will be the time to take a step back". He began 2015 as the world number 41. However, his form did not improve as he could not qualify for a single major tournament and only advanced to the last 32 once in the 31 events he played in. He dropped to 121st in the world after the 2016 World Championship and announced he would not be entering Q School, although he did not rule out the possibility of attempting to return in the future.

== Premier League performances ==
Lloyd qualified for the first three Premier League tournaments between 2005 and 2007. In 2005, he finished second after the league stage but lost to Taylor in the final. In 2006, Lloyd went out to eventual winner Taylor in the semi-finals, then finished fifth in the league stage in 2007. Due to his slip in the rankings, he has not competed in the Premier League since then.

== Personal life ==
Lloyd is diabetic. He lost six stone in 2020 after starting a fitness regime.

== World Championship results ==
=== PDC ===
- 2000: First round (lost to Shayne Burgess 0–3) (sets)
- 2001: First round (lost to John Part 0–3)
- 2002: Semi-finals (lost to Peter Manley 4–6)
- 2003: Third round (lost to Chris Mason 1–5)
- 2004: Fourth round (lost to Wayne Mardle 3–4)
- 2005: Quarter-finals (lost to Wayne Mardle 4–5)
- 2006: First round (lost to Gary Welding 2–3)
- 2007: Second round (lost to Raymond van Barneveld 3–4)
- 2008: First round (lost to Jan van der Rassel 2–3)
- 2009: First round (lost to Jelle Klaasen 0–3)
- 2010: Third round (lost to Ronnie Baxter 1–4)
- 2011: Second round (lost to Mark Hylton 2–4)
- 2012: Third round (lost to Gary Anderson 1–4)
- 2013: Third round (lost to Michael van Gerwen 1–4)
- 2014: First round (lost to Beau Anderson 2–3)

== Career finals ==
=== PDC major finals: 5 (2 titles) ===
Legend
World Matchplay (1–0)
World Grand Prix (1–1)
Premier League (0–1)
US Open (0–1)

Outcome	No.	Year	Championship	Opponent in the final	Score
Winner	1.	2004	World Grand Prix	Alan Warriner-Little	7–3 (s)
Runner-up	1.	2005	Premier League	Phil Taylor	4–16 (l)
Winner	2.	2005	World Matchplay	John Part	18–12 (l)
Runner-up	2.	2005	World Grand Prix	Phil Taylor	1–7 (s)
Runner-up	3.	2008	US Open	Phil Taylor	0–3 (s)

=== BDO major final: 1 (1 runner-up) ===
Outcome	No.	Year	Championship	Opponent in the final	Score
Runner-up	1.	2006	International Darts League	(Netherlands) Raymond van Barneveld	5–13 (s)

== Performance timeline ==
Tournament	1999	2000	2001	2002	2003	2004	2005	2006	2007	2008	2009	2010	2011		2012	2013	2014
PDC World Championship	DNP	1R	1R	SF	3R	4R	QF	1R	2R	1R	1R	3R	2R		3R	3R	1R
UK Open	Not held				4R	QF	4R	5R	SF	3R	5R	3R	3R		4R	3R	DNQ
World Matchplay	QF	1R	1R	SF	SF	QF	W	1R	1R	1R	2R	1R	1R		1R	1R	DNQ
World Grand Prix	DNP	QF	1R	2R	QF	W	RU	1R	QF	QF	2R	1R	1R		1R	1R	DNQ
European Championship	Not held									1R	QF	SF	2R		QF	2R	DNQ
Grand Slam of Darts	Not held								2R	RR	2R	2R	DNQ				
Players Championship Finals	Not held										QF	QF	QF	1R	1R	1R	DNQ
Las Vegas Desert Classic	NH			1R	SF	1R	QF	1R	1R	1R	2R	Not held					
Premier League Darts	Not held						RU	SF	5th	DNP							
US Open/WSoD	Not held							5R	1R	RU	Not held						
Championship League	Not held									RR	RR	RR	RR		RR	RR	NH
Masters of Darts	Not held						RR	NH	RR	Not held							
Winmau World Masters	DNP		2R	Did not participate													
World Darts Trophy	NH			DNP				QF	1R	Not held							
International Darts League	NH				DNP			RU	RR	Not held							

Performance Table Legend
W	Won the tournament	F	Finalist	SF	Semifinalist	QF	Quarterfinalist	#R; RR; Prel.	Lost in # round Round-robin; Preliminary round	DQ	Disqualified
DNQ	Did not qualify	DNP	Did not participate	WD	Withdrew	NH	Tournament not held	#R; RR; Prel.	Lost in # round Round-robin; Preliminary round	NYF	Not yet founded

Sporting positions
Preceded by Phil Taylor	PDC World Number One; February 2005 – 11 June 2006; 18 June 2006 – 1 June 2007	Succeeded by Phil Taylor
