= US Open (darts) =

Tournament information
- Venue: Mohegan Sun Casino Resort
- Location: Uncasville, Connecticut (2007–2008); Atlanta, Georgia (2009–2010)
- Country: United States
- Established: 2007
- Organisation(s): PDC
- Format: (PDC Major 2007–2008) (PDC Pro Tour 2009–2010)
- Prize fund: £31,000 (2010)

Final champion(s)
- (England) Phil Taylor

The US Open was a United States darts tournament, organised by the Professional Darts Corporation (PDC), which launched in May 2007. It replaced the World Series of Darts which ran for one year and was cancelled as a result of poor television ratings on ESPN.

In 2007 and 2008 the tournament was held at the Mohegan Sun Casino Resort in Connecticut – which was also the venue used for the World Series of Darts. The tournament moved to Atlanta, Georgia for the 2009 event. In 2009 and 2010 the event became Players Championship events as part of the PDC Pro Tour.

Phil Taylor won the first two events, but opted not to take part in the 2009 version which Dennis Priestley won. Taylor came back in 2010 and beat Denis Ovens in the final.

== Television coverage ==
The 2007 tournament was broadcast live in the UK on satellite station Challenge, who were broadcasting a PDC tournament for the first time. Limited coverage of the event was shown on US sport channel Versus. In 2008 coverage passed to Nuts TV in the UK.

== Format ==
The US Open was a PDC Major event in 2007 and 2008 . It became a PDC Pro Tour event in 2009 and 2010 for the last two editions of the event.

== Results ==
Year (Note: The 2009 and 2010 editions are not listed in the PDC Roll of Honour for winners of PDC majors. The US Open events in 2009 and 2010 were added to the PDC Pro Tour after the tournament had its major status removed.)	Champion (average in final)	Score	Runner-up (average in final)	Prize fund	Champion	Runner-up
PDC major event
2007	Phil Taylor (103.10)	4–1 (s)	Raymond van Barneveld (99.06)	£126,000	£12,500	£7,500
2008	Phil Taylor (96.86)	3–0 (s)	Colin Lloyd (91.48)	£126,000	£12,500	£7,500
PDC Pro Tour event
2009	Dennis Priestley	6–3 (l)	Andy Hamilton	$50,000	$12,000	$6,000
2010	Phil Taylor	6–3 (l)	Denis Ovens	£31,200	£6,000	£3,000
