= 2012 PDPA Players Championship 8 =

Second Round
1	(England) Justin Pipe	6
(England) Kevin McDine	2
(England) Adrian Lewis	6
(England) Joe Cullen	5
16	(Netherlands) Vincent van der Voort	1
(England) Matt Clark	6
17	(England) Kevin Painter	6
(England) Ian Moss	4
8	(Wales) Mark Webster	5
(England) Dennis Priestley	6
25	(England) Ian White	6
(England) Alex Roy	2
9	(Netherlands) Michael van Gerwen	6
(Wales) Jamie Lewis	4
24	(England) Mark Walsh	6
(England) James Hubbard	4
5	(Scotland) Gary Anderson	6
(England) Adrian Gray	2
(England) Ross Smith	3
(Scotland) Robert Thornton	6
12	(England) Colin Lloyd	2
(England) Steve Brown	6
21	(Wales) Richie Burnett	6
(England) Mark Frost	1
4	(Netherlands) Raymond van Barneveld	6
(England) Matthew Edgar	3
29	(England) Denis Ovens	6
(Netherlands) Jelle Klaasen	1
13	(England) Steve Beaton	6
(South Africa) Devon Petersen	4
(England) Terry Temple	6
(England) Scott Coleman	0
2	(England) Dave Chisnall	6
(England) Alan Tabern	2
(England) Dennis Smith	6
(England) Steve Grubb	3
15	(England) Mervyn King	6
(England) Darren Whittingham	2
18	(England) Michael Smith	6
(England) Kevin Dowling	3
7	(Australia) Simon Whitlock	6
(England) Mark Dudbridge	2
26	(England) Andy Hamilton	6
(England) Shaun Griffiths	1
10	(Canada) John Part	6
(Belgium) Kurt Van De Rijck	2
23	(England) Andy Smith	6
(England) Sam Hill	3
6	(England) Ronnie Baxter	6
(England) Gary Butcher	1
(England) Richie Howson	6
(England) Nick Fullwell	2
11	(England) Colin Osborne	3
(England) Dean Winstanley	6
(England) Andy Jenkins	2
(England) Darren Webster	6
3	(England) Wes Newton	6
(England) Stephen Hardy	3
30	(England) Scott Rand	5
(England) Michael Barnard	6
14	(England) Terry Jenkins	3
(Scotland) John Henderson	6
(England) Brian Woods	6
(Netherlands) Jerry Hendriks	2

Third Round
1	(England) Justin Pipe	6
(England) Adrian Lewis	2
(England) Matt Clark	5
17	(England) Kevin Painter	6
(England) Dennis Priestley	6
25	(England) Ian White	5
9	(Netherlands) Michael van Gerwen	6
24	(England) Mark Walsh	3
5	(Scotland) Gary Anderson	4
(Scotland) Robert Thornton	6
(England) Steve Brown	1
21	(Wales) Richie Burnett	6
4	(Netherlands) Raymond van Barneveld	6
29	(England) Denis Ovens	3
13	(England) Steve Beaton	6
(England) Terry Temple	5
2	(England) Dave Chisnall	6
(England) Dennis Smith	2
15	(England) Mervyn King	6
18	(England) Michael Smith	2
7	(Australia) Simon Whitlock	6
26	(England) Andy Hamilton	3
10	(Canada) John Part	4
23	(England) Andy Smith	6
6	(England) Ronnie Baxter	3
(England) Richie Howson	6
(England) Dean Winstanley	2
(England) Darren Webster	6
3	(England) Wes Newton	6
(England) Michael Barnard	1
(Scotland) John Henderson	6
(England) Brian Woods	2

Fourth Round
1	(England) Justin Pipe	6
17	(England) Kevin Painter	3
(England) Dennis Priestley	3
9	(Netherlands) Michael van Gerwen	6
(Scotland) Robert Thornton	6
21	(Wales) Richie Burnett	0
4	(Netherlands) Raymond van Barneveld	4
13	(England) Steve Beaton	6
2	(England) Dave Chisnall	4
15	(England) Mervyn King	6
7	(Australia) Simon Whitlock	6
23	(England) Andy Smith	5
(England) Richie Howson	2
(England) Darren Webster	6
3	(England) Wes Newton	6
(Scotland) John Henderson	1

Quarter-Finals
1	(England) Justin Pipe	1
9	(Netherlands) Michael van Gerwen	6
(Scotland) Robert Thornton	6
13	(England) Steve Beaton	2
15	(England) Mervyn King	1
7	(Australia) Simon Whitlock	6
(England) Darren Webster	5
3	(England) Wes Newton	6

Semi-Finals
9	(Netherlands) Michael van Gerwen	6
(Scotland) Robert Thornton	2
7	(Australia) Simon Whitlock	6
3	(England) Wes Newton	3

Final
9	(Netherlands) Michael van Gerwen	6
7	(Australia) Simon Whitlock	1
