= 1999 BDO World Darts Championship =

Tournament information
- Dates: 2–10 January 1999
- Venue: Lakeside Country Club
- Location: Frimley Green, Surrey
- Country: England, United Kingdom
- Organisation(s): BDO
- Format: Sets; Final – best of 11
- Prize fund: £167,200
- Winner's share: £42,000
- High checkout: 164 (Belgium) Erik Clarys

Champion(s)
- (Netherlands) Raymond van Barneveld

The 1999 BDO World Darts Championship (known for sponsorship reasons as the 1999 Embassy World Professional Darts Championship) was held from 2–10 January 1999 at the Lakeside Country Club in Frimley Green, Surrey, United Kingdom.

Defending champion Raymond van Barneveld retained his title with victory over Ronnie Baxter in another thrilling final which, like the previous year's decider against Richie Burnett, went to the final set and a tiebreak. Baxter had led at various points throughout the match and missed crucial darts at doubles in the final set. Barneveld became the first player to retain the World Championship since Eric Bristow won it in three consecutive years in 1984, 1985 and 1986.

The standout match of this championship, however, was the quarter-final between Chris Mason and Martin Adams. Adams looked set for victory when he led 4–1 in sets, but he missed nine darts for the match, and this opened the door for Mason to stage a huge comeback, forcing a final-set tiebreak. Finally, Adams missed a double one which would have forced a sudden-death leg, and Mason hit it to secure the win. This match also saw no fewer than 29 180s - 16 for Adams and 13 for Mason.

== Seeds ==
1. (Netherlands) Raymond van Barneveld
2. (England) Ronnie Baxter
3. (England) Colin Monk
4. (Australia) Graham Hunt
5. (Wales) Ritchie Davies
6. (England) Mervyn King
7. (Netherlands) Roland Scholten
8. (Australia) Steve Duke

== Prize money ==
The prize money was £167,200.

Champion: £42,000
Runner-Up: £21,000
Semi-Finalists (2): £9,400
Quarter-Finalists (4): £4,750
Last 16 (8): £3,600
Last 32 (16): £2,350

There was also a 9 Dart Checkout prize of £52,000, along with a High Checkout prize of £2,000.

== The Results ==
=== Preliminary round ===
- (Scotland) Peter Johnstone 3 – 2 Jason Lucas (United States)

=== Last 32 ===
First Round (best of 5 sets)
1	(Netherlands) Raymond van Barneveld (95.88)	3
(Wales) Sean Palfrey (92.01)	0
(Scotland) Les Wallace (92.07)	3
(Scotland) Danny Cunningham (92.43)	0
8	(Australia) Steve Duke (85.95)	3
(England) Steve Beaton (83.37)	0
(Wales) Marshall James (90.42)	3
(Scotland) Peter Johnstone (85.17)	2
5	(Wales) Ritchie Davies (90.75)	1
(England) Chris Mason (90.12)	3
(England) Ted Hankey (100.38)	3
(United States) Roger Carter (90.03)	1
4	(Australia) Graham Hunt (86.13)	3
(England) Andy Jenkins (86.22)	1
(England) Martin Adams (92.70)	3
(England) Mike Gregory (90.27)	1
2	(England) Ronnie Baxter (92.67)	3
(Wales) Richie Burnett (90.69)	0
(England) Kevin Painter (97.83)	3
(England) Robbie Widdows (99.45)	0
7	(Netherlands) Roland Scholten (88.11)	3
(England) John Walton (87.87)	0
(Netherlands) Co Stompé (96.09)	3
(England) Davy Richardson (89.64)	0
6	(England) Mervyn King (94.98)	2
(England) Andy Fordham (96.36)	3
(England) Paul Williams (90.51)	3
(England) Matt Clark (88.71)	2
3	(England) Colin Monk (84.09)	3
(England) Paul Hogan (83.58)	2
(England) Tony Littleton (82.29)	3
(Belgium) Erik Clarys (81.84)	2

Second Round (best of 5 sets)
1	(Netherlands) Raymond van Barneveld (91.95)	3
(Scotland) Les Wallace (88.74)	2
8	(Australia) Steve Duke (87.72)	3
(Wales) Marshall James (86.91)	1
(England) Chris Mason (91.98)	3
(England) Ted Hankey (89.85)	1
4	(Australia) Graham Hunt (86.28)	1
(England) Martin Adams (100.62)	3
2	(England) Ronnie Baxter (99.24)	3
(England) Kevin Painter (87.39)	0
7	(Netherlands) Roland Scholten (90.33)	3
(Netherlands) Co Stompé (88.29)	2
(England) Andy Fordham (98.46)	3
(England) Paul Williams (87.00)	0
3	(England) Colin Monk (84.18)	3
(England) Tony Littleton (84.09)	0

Quarter-Finals (best of 9 sets)
1	(Netherlands) Raymond van Barneveld (98.76)	5
8	(Australia) Steve Duke (88.20)	1
(England) Chris Mason (94.41)	5
(England) Martin Adams (95.61)	4
2	(England) Ronnie Baxter (93.81)	5
7	(Netherlands) Roland Scholten (86.07)	2
(England) Andy Fordham (87.93)	5
3	(England) Colin Monk (86.94)	3

Semi-Finals (best of 9 sets)
1	(Netherlands) Raymond van Barneveld (94.71)	5
(England) Chris Mason (90.39)	2
2	(England) Ronnie Baxter (95.61)	5
(England) Andy Fordham (88.89)	1

Final (best of 11 sets)
1	(Netherlands) Raymond van Barneveld (94.35)	6
2	(England) Ronnie Baxter (94.65)	5
