= 2011 UK Open Qualifier 5 =

UK Open Qualifier 5

Tournament information
- Dates: Saturday 16 April
- Venue: Metrodome
- Location: Barnsley
- Country: England
- Organisation(s): PDC
- Format: Best of 11 legs
- Prize fund: £34,600
- Winner's share: £6,000
- Nine-dart finish: (Wales) Wayne Atwood

Champion(s)
- (Scotland) Gary Anderson

The 2011 UK Open Qualifier 5 was the fifth of eight 2011 UK Open Darts Qualifiers which was held at the Metrodome in Barnsley on Saturday 16 April.

== Prize money ==
Stage	Prize money (Total – £34,600)
Winner	£6,000
Runner Up	£3,000
Semi Final	£2,000
Quarter Final	£1,000
Fourth Round	£600
Third Round	£400
Second Round	£200
First Round	£0
Preliminary Round	£0

== Draw ==
Second round
(England)	Colin Lloyd	6
(England)	Harry Robinson	5
(England)	Kevin Painter	6
(Netherlands)	Michael van Gerwen	4
(England)	Steve Beaton	6
(Scotland)	Robert Thornton	4
(England)	Ronnie Baxter	6
(England)	Gary Eastwood	1
(Spain)	Antonio Alcinas	6
(Wales)	Barrie Bates	3
(England)	Dennis Priestley	4
(Austria)	Mensur Suljović	6
(Republic of Ireland)	William O'Connor	6
(Sweden)	Magnus Caris	4
(Canada)	John Part	6
(Wales)	Steve Evans	4
(Northern Ireland)	John MaGowan	4
(England)	Justin Pipe	6
(England)	Mark Stephenson	0
(Scotland)	Gary Anderson	6
(England)	Colin Osborne	6
(Northern Ireland)	Brendan Dolan	2
(England)	Reece Robinson	3
(England)	Steve Brown	6
(England)	Wayne Jones	2
(England)	Alan Tabern	6
(England)	Terry Temple	6
(England)	Alex Roy	5
(England)	Steve Farmer	0
(England)	Mervyn King	6
(England)	Mark Walsh	4
(England)	Andy Jenkins	6
(England)	James Wade	6
(England)	Mark Frost	4
(England)	Darren Johnson	6
(England)	Peter Hudson	0
(England)	Peter Manley	4
(Australia)	Simon Whitlock	6
(Scotland)	John Henderson	6
(Netherlands)	Vincent van der Voort	2
(England)	Ian White	6
(England)	Kirk Shepherd	1
(England)	Kevin McDine	4
(England)	Matt Jackson	6
(England)	Chris Thompson	1
(England)	Phil Taylor	6
(England)	Jason Crawley	6
(Germany)	Jyhan Artut	2
(England)	Jamie Caven	6
(England)	Dave Chisnall	5
(Northern Ireland)	Michael Mansell	6
(England)	Mark Dudbridge	5
(Wales)	Richie Burnett	6
(England)	Colin Monk	2
(England)	Scott Rand	6
(England)	Michael Smith	5
(Australia)	Paul Nicholson	6
(England)	Andy Smith	4
(England)	Wes Newton	6
(England)	Dennis Smith	3
(Wales)	Wayne Atwood	6
(Republic of Ireland)	Mick McGowan	1
(England)	Adrian Lewis	6
(England)	Tony Ayres	3

Third round
(England)	Colin Lloyd	2
(England)	Kevin Painter	6
(England)	Steve Beaton	1
(England)	Ronnie Baxter	6
(Spain)	Antonio Alcinas	0
(Austria)	Mensur Suljović	6
(Republic of Ireland)	William O'Connor	4
(Canada)	John Part	6
(England)	Justin Pipe	4
(Scotland)	Gary Anderson	6
(England)	Colin Osborne	6
(England)	Steve Brown	1
(England)	Alan Tabern	3
(England)	Terry Temple	6
(England)	Mervyn King	6
(England)	Andy Jenkins	3
(England)	James Wade	6
(England)	Darren Johnson	4
(Australia)	Simon Whitlock	6
(Scotland)	John Henderson	3
(England)	Ian White	6
(England)	Matt Jackson	3
(England)	Phil Taylor	6
(England)	Jason Crawley	0
(England)	Jamie Caven	6
(Northern Ireland)	Michael Mansell	5
(Wales)	Richie Burnett	6
(England)	Scott Rand	2
(Australia)	Paul Nicholson	4
(England)	Wes Newton	6
(Wales)	Wayne Atwood	4
(England)	Adrian Lewis	6

Fourth round
(England)	Kevin Painter	6
(England)	Ronnie Baxter	3
(Austria)	Mensur Suljović	0
(Canada)	John Part	6
(Scotland)	Gary Anderson	6
(England)	Colin Osborne	0
(England)	Terry Temple	3
(England)	Mervyn King	6
(England)	James Wade	3
(Australia)	Simon Whitlock	6
(England)	Ian White	1
(England)	Phil Taylor	6
(England)	Jamie Caven	4
(Wales)	Richie Burnett	6
(England)	Wes Newton	6
(England)	Adrian Lewis	4

Quarter-finals
(England)	Kevin Painter	5
(Canada)	John Part	6
(Scotland)	Gary Anderson	6
(England)	Mervyn King	3
(Australia)	Simon Whitlock	3
(England)	Phil Taylor	6
(Wales)	Richie Burnett	0
(England)	Wes Newton	6

Semi-finals
(Canada)	John Part	2
(Scotland)	Gary Anderson	6
(England)	Phil Taylor	6
(England)	Wes Newton	5

Final
(Scotland)	Gary Anderson	6
(England)	Phil Taylor	4
