= 2012 UK Open Qualifier 4 =

UK Open Qualifier 4

Tournament information
- Dates: Sunday 25 March
- Venue: Barnsley Metrodome
- Location: Barnsley
- Country: England
- Organisation(s): PDC
- Format: Best of 11 legs
- Prize fund: £34,600
- Winner's share: £6,000

Champion(s)
- (England) Phil Taylor

The 2012 UK Open Qualifier 4 was the fourth of eight 2012 UK Open Darts Qualifiers which was held at the Metrodome in Barnsley on Sunday 25 March.

== Prize money ==
Stage	Prize money (Total-£34,600)
Winner	£6,000
Runner Up	£3,000
Semi Final	£2,000
Quarter Final	£1,000
Fourth Round	£600
Third Round	£400
Second Round	£200
First Round	£0
Preliminary Round	£0

== Draw ==
Second round
(England)	Michael Smith	6
(England)	Tony Littleton	3
(England)	Adam Smith-Neale	4
(England)	Dennis Smith	6
(England)	Matthew Tedstone	1
(England)	Colin Osborne	6
(Canada)	John Part	3
(England)	Peter Hudson	6
(Netherlands)	Gino Vos	1
(Republic of Ireland)	Connie Finnan	6
(Republic of Ireland)	Liam Kelly	1
(India)	Prakash Jiwa	6
(Scotland)	Gary Anderson	6
(England)	Andy Brown	0
(England)	Mark Walsh	4
(Belgium)	Kim Huybrechts	6
(Netherlands)	Roland Scholten	0
(England)	Justin Pipe	6
(England)	Joe Murnan	2
(Netherlands)	Co Stompé	6
(England)	Reece Robinson	3
(England)	Chris Thompson	6
(England)	Johnny Haines	1
(England)	Darren Webster	6
(England)	Nigel Birch	5
(England)	James Hubbard	6
(Wales)	Richie Burnett	6
(England)	Gaz Cousins	3
(England)	Karl Forrington	2
(England)	Wayne Jones	6
(Spain)	Antonio Alcinas	5
(England)	Dennis Priestley	6
(England)	Andy Hamilton	4
(England)	Adam Hunt	6
(Netherlands)	Jerry Hendriks	3
(South Africa)	Devon Petersen	6
(England)	Adrian Gray	1
(England)	Stuart Kellett	6
(Netherlands)	Michael van Gerwen	3
(England)	Phil Taylor	6
(England)	Steve West	3
(England)	Ronnie Baxter	6
(England)	Jimmy Mann	5
(England)	Wes Newton	6
(Wales)	Mark Webster	6
(England)	Andy Hibbert	1
(England)	Joe Cullen	2
(Netherlands)	Raymond van Barneveld	6
(Scotland)	Peter Wright	5
(England)	Adrian Lewis	6
(Republic of Ireland)	William O'Connor	3
(England)	Jason Crawley	6
(Germany)	Bernd Roith	3
(Scotland)	Keith Stephen	6
(England)	Terry Temple	6
(England)	Fred Smith	3
(Northern Ireland)	Brendan Dolan	6
(England)	Steve Brown	4
(Netherlands)	Mareno Michels	1
(England)	Dean Winstanley	6
(England)	Andy Smith	6
(England)	Alex Roy	1
(England)	Brandon Walsh	2
(England)	Mark Jones	6

Third round
(England)	Michael Smith	5
(England)	Dennis Smith	6
(England)	Colin Osborne	6
(England)	Peter Hudson	4
(Republic of Ireland)	Connie Finnan	4
(India)	Prakash Jiwa	6
(Scotland)	Gary Anderson	6
(Belgium)	Kim Huybrechts	4
(England)	Justin Pipe	6
(Netherlands)	Co Stompé	4
(England)	Chris Thompson	3
(England)	Darren Webster	6
(England)	James Hubbard	0
(Wales)	Richie Burnett	6
(England)	Wayne Jones	0
(England)	Dennis Priestley	6
(England)	Adam Hunt	2
(South Africa)	Devon Petersen	6
(England)	Stuart Kellett	3
(England)	Phil Taylor	6
(England)	Ronnie Baxter	2
(England)	Wes Newton	6
(Wales)	Mark Webster	4
(Netherlands)	Raymond van Barneveld	6
(England)	Adrian Lewis	6
(England)	Jason Crawley	2
(Scotland)	Keith Stephen	2
(England)	Terry Temple	6
(Northern Ireland)	Brendan Dolan	3
(England)	Dean Winstanley	6
(England)	Andy Smith	6
(England)	Mark Jones	4

Fourth round
(England)	Dennis Smith	6
(England)	Colin Osborne	1
(India)	Prakash Jiwa	6
(Scotland)	Gary Anderson	4
(England)	Justin Pipe	5
(England)	Darren Webster	6
(Wales)	Richie Burnett	5
(England)	Dennis Priestley	6
(South Africa)	Devon Petersen	1
(England)	Phil Taylor	6
(England)	Wes Newton	5
(Netherlands)	Raymond van Barneveld	6
(England)	Adrian Lewis	5
(England)	Terry Temple	6
(England)	Dean Winstanley	6
(England)	Andy Smith	5

Quarter-finals
(England)	Dennis Smith	6
(India)	Prakash Jiwa	1
(England)	Darren Webster	5
(England)	Dennis Priestley	6
(England)	Phil Taylor	6
(Netherlands)	Raymond van Barneveld	4
(England)	Terry Temple	2
(England)	Dean Winstanley	6

Semi-finals
(England)	Dennis Smith	6
(England)	Dennis Priestley	5
(England)	Phil Taylor	6
(England)	Dean Winstanley	1

Final
(England)	Dennis Smith	3
(England)	Phil Taylor	6
