= 1998 BDO World Darts Championship =

Tournament information
- Dates: 3–11 January 1998
- Venue: Lakeside Country Club
- Location: Frimley Green, Surrey
- Country: England, United Kingdom
- Organisation(s): BDO
- Format: Sets; Final – best of 11
- Prize fund: £166,000
- Winner's share: £40,000
- High checkout: 164 (England) Andy Fordham

Champion(s)
- (Netherlands) Raymond van Barneveld

The 1998 BDO World Darts Championship (known for sponsorship reasons as the 1998 Embassy World Professional Darts Championship) was held from 3–11 January 1998 at the Lakeside Country Club in Frimley Green, Surrey.

It saw Dutchman Raymond van Barneveld, the number one seed, win the first of four BDO world titles (and five overall), avenging his defeat by Richie Burnett in the 1995 final by beating him in a decider which went to the final set and a tiebreak. Barneveld became the first top seed to win the world title since his future rival Phil Taylor in 1992, and the second champion from outside the United Kingdom after John Part in 1994.

Defending champion Les Wallace lost in the second round to 1996 champion Steve Beaton.

== Seeds ==
There were eight seeds for the tournament.

1. (Netherlands) Raymond van Barneveld
2. (England) Ronnie Baxter
3. (Netherlands) Roland Scholten
4. (England) Martin Adams
5. (England) Mervyn King
6. (Wales) Sean Palfrey
7. (Wales) Marshall James
8. (Scotland) Les Wallace

== Prize money ==
The prize money was £160,400.

Champion: £40,000
Runner-Up: £20,000
Semi-Finalists (2): £9,000
Quarter-Finalists (4): £4,600
Last 16 (8): £3,500
Last 32 (16): £2,250

There was also a 9 Dart Checkout prize of £52,000, along with a High Checkout prize of £1,600.

== Results ==
Players in bold denote match winners.

**First Round** (best of 5 sets)
1	(Netherlands) **Raymond van Barneveld** (85.86)	**3**
(England) Michael Marshall (83.40)	1
(England) **Andy Fordham** (89.61)	**3**
(England) Andy Jenkins (81.72)	1
8	(Scotland) **Les Wallace** (91.35)	**3**
(England) Andy Smith (80.04)	2
(England) **Steve Beaton** (88.62)	**3**
(England) Paul Williams (90.15)	1
5	(England) **Mervyn King** (95.46)	**3**
(England) Matt Clark (93.42)	0
(England) **Ted Hankey** (101.55)	**3**
(Australia) Wayne Weening (89.10)	0
4	(England) Martin Adams (90.93)	2
(England) **Robbie Widdows** (90.24)	**3**
(England) **Colin Monk** (87.60)	**3**
(Wales) Ritchie Davies (83.43)	1
2	(England) Ronnie Baxter (85.17)	2
(Scotland) **Peter Johnstone** (85.95)	**3**
(England) **Chris Mason** (88.32)	**3**
(Northern Ireland) Geoff Wylie (82.77)	1
7	(Wales) Marshall James (88.98)	1
(Wales) **Richie Burnett** (93.63)	**3**
(England) **Kevin Painter** (98.88)	**3**
(Belgium) Erik Clarys (89.37)	1
6	(Wales) **Sean Palfrey** (87.87)	**3**
(Australia) Peter Hinkley (80.85)	1
(England) **Bobby George** (87.60)	**3**
(Spain) Braulio Roncero (81.69)	1
3	(Netherlands) **Roland Scholten** (82.77)	**3**
(Netherlands) Co Stompé (81.72)	2
(United States) **Roger Carter** (89.88)	**3**
(Scotland) Bob Taylor (84.30)	1

**Second Round** (best of 5 sets)
1	(Netherlands) **Raymond van Barneveld** (91.95)	**3**
(England) Andy Fordham (91.95)	2
8	(Scotland) Les Wallace (87.93)	2
(England) **Steve Beaton** (91.17)	**3**
5	(England) Mervyn King (92.58)	0
(England) **Ted Hankey** (92.37)	**3**
(England) Robbie Widdows (91.08)	2
(England) **Colin Monk** (91.38)	**3**
(Scotland) **Peter Johnstone** (88.44)	**3**
(England) Chris Mason (88.17)	0
(Wales) **Richie Burnett** (96.72)	**3**
(England) Kevin Painter (95.25)	1
6	(Wales) **Sean Palfrey** (84.24)	**3**
(England) Bobby George (82.08)	2
3	(Netherlands) **Roland Scholten** (91.47)	**3**
(United States) Roger Carter (89.31)	1

**Quarter-Finals** (best of 9 sets)
1	(Netherlands) **Raymond van Barneveld** (95.46)	**5**
(England) Steve Beaton (93.60)	0
(England) Ted Hankey (91.26)	2
(England) **Colin Monk** (92.10)	**5**
(Scotland) Peter Johnstone (86.40)	2
(Wales) **Richie Burnett** (92.16)	**5**
6	(Wales) Sean Palfrey (88.56)	4
3	(Netherlands) **Roland Scholten** (90.51)	**5**

**Semi-Finals** (best of 9 sets)
1	(Netherlands) **Raymond van Barneveld** (97.08)	**5**
(England) Colin Monk (93.12)	3
(Wales) **Richie Burnett** (93.57)	**5**
3	(Netherlands) Roland Scholten (84.51)	1

**Final** (best of 11 sets)
1	(Netherlands) **Raymond van Barneveld** (93.96)	**6**
(Wales) Richie Burnett (97.14)	5
