= 2004 Las Vegas Desert Classic =

Tournament information
- Dates: 30 June–4 July 2004
- Venue: MGM Grand Casino and Hotel
- Location: Las Vegas, Nevada
- Country: United States
- Organisation(s): PDC
- Format: Sets; Final – best of 11
- Prize fund: £84,100
- Winner's share: £15,000
- High checkout: 164 (Canada) John Part

Champion(s)
- (England) Phil Taylor

The 2004 Las Vegas Desert Classic, promoted at the time as the Las Vegas Desert Classic III, was the third year that the Professional Darts Corporation held a major darts tournament in the United States. It was held between 30 June and July 4, 2004.

The tournament was held at the MGM Grand Las Vegas in Las Vegas, Nevada and was broadcast in the UK by Sky Sports. The layout of the playing hall had been modified from the previous year, and attracted larger crowds.

Peter Manley, who went on to win the title the previous year, lost his title defence to compatriot Kevin Painter in the second round, by 3 sets to 0.

The tournament was won by Phil Taylor, who beat Wayne Mardle 6–4 in sets in the final.

== Qualified players ==
=== Prequalified players ===
PDC Top 12
1. (England) Phil Taylor
2. (Canada) John Part
3. (England) Colin Lloyd
4. (England) Peter Manley
5. (Netherlands) Roland Scholten
6. (England) Wayne Mardle
7. (England) Kevin Painter
8. (England) Andy Jenkins
9. (England) Alan Warriner
10. (England) Denis Ovens
11. (England) Ronnie Baxter
12. (England) Dennis Smith

North American Qualifiers
1. (United States) Darin Young
2. (United States) Bruce Cottrell
3. (United States) Ricky Villanueva

Canadian Number One
1. (Canada) Gerry Convery

=== Qualifiers ===
Monday Qualifiers

- (England) Adrian Lewis
- (Wales) Richie Burnett
- (Singapore) Paul Lim
- (England) Dennis Priestley
- (England) Steve Coote
- (England) Mark Dudbridge
- (England) Bob Anderson
- (England) Lionel Sams

Tuesday Qualifiers

- (England) Darren Webster
- (England) Wes Newton
- (England) Adrian Gray
- (United States) John Kuczynski
- (England) Steve Beaton
- (England) Paul Williams
- (England) James Wade
- (England) Alex Roy

== Prize money ==
Stage (no. of players)		Prize money (Total: £84,100)
Winner	(1)	£15,000
Runner-Up	(1)	£7,500
Semi-finalists	(2)	£5,000
Quarter-finalists	(4)	£3,500
Round 2	(8)	£2,000
Round 1	(16)	£1,350

== Results ==
=== Men's tournament ===
Round 1 (best of 3 sets); June 30
(England) Phil Taylor	2
(England) Adrian Lewis	0
(England) Alan Warriner	2
(England) Mark Dudbridge	1
(England) Steve Coote	w/o
(United States) Ricky Villanueva †	w/d
(England) Andy Jenkins	2
(England) Bob Anderson	0
(England) Kevin Painter	2
(England) James Wade	1
(England) Peter Manley	2
(Singapore) Paul Lim	0
(England) Dennis Smith	2
(England) Paul Williams	0
(Canada) Gerry Convery	2
(England) Darren Webster	0
(England) Wayne Mardle	2
(England) Wes Newton	1
(United States) Darin Young	2
(England) Lionel Sams	1
(England) Ronnie Baxter	2
(England) Steve Beaton	0
(England) Denis Ovens	2
(United States) John Kuczynski	1
(Canada) John Part	2
(England) Alex Roy	1
(England) Adrian Gray	2
(United States) Bruce Cottrell	0
(Wales) Richie Burnett	2
(England) Colin Lloyd	1
(England) Dennis Priestley	2
(Netherlands) Roland Scholten	1

Round 2 (best of 5 sets); July 1
(England) Phil Taylor	3
(England) Alan Warriner	1
(England) Steve Coote	3
(England) Andy Jenkins	2
(England) Kevin Painter	3
(England) Peter Manley	0
(England) Dennis Smith	3
(Canada) Gerry Convery	1
(England) Wayne Mardle	3
(United States) Darin Young	0
(England) Ronnie Baxter	3
(England) Denis Ovens	2
(Canada) John Part	3
(England) Adrian Gray	0
(Wales) Richie Burnett	3
(England) Dennis Priestley	1

Quarter-finals (best of 5 sets); July 2
(England) Phil Taylor 98.37	3
(England) Steve Coote 90.93	0
(England) Kevin Painter 90.78	3
(England) Dennis Smith 90.03	1
(England) Wayne Mardle 91.20	3
(England) Ronnie Baxter 86.10	0
(Canada) John Part 91.77	3
(Wales) Richie Burnett 92.70	1

Semi-finals (best of 7 sets); July 3
(England) Phil Taylor 96.39	4
(England) Kevin Painter 91.02	2
(England) Wayne Mardle 87.42	4
(Canada) John Part 87.90	1

Final (best of 11 sets); July 4
(England) Phil Taylor 100.80	6
(England) Wayne Mardle 95.22	4

† Ricky Villanueva withdrew from the tournament for unknown reasons

=== Women's tournament ===
Semi-finals (best of 7 legs)
(England) Trina Gulliver	4
(Canada) Gayl King	1
(United States) Stacy Bromberg	4
(United States) Carolyn Mars	1

Final (best of 11 legs)
(England) Trina Gulliver	6
(United States) Stacy Bromberg	5

== Tournament summary ==
=== Round One ===
Featured the last 32 and was not televised. Phil Taylor had the highest average in the best of 3 sets matches of 100.6 and coverage began live on Sky Sports with Round Two, the last 16 on Thursday 1 July.

=== Round Two ===
The first match featured Kevin Painter against Peter Manley. Manley was erratic in the first set which went to Painter, who then went on to beat Manley 3-0 including checkouts of 143, 124 and 102. Painter averaged of 94.5.

The last American in the tournament, Darin Young (who was World Soft Tip Darts Champion) had beaten Lionel Sams in the first round and faced "Hawaii 501" – Wayne Mardle. The first two sets were close, but Mardle went through comfortably 3–0.

John Part also had a comfortable win against Adrian Gray and in the early stages of the match he was averaging 111.33. It was a 3–0 win for Part who also checked out 161 and a 164.

Alan Warriner faced Phil Taylor and started well. "The Ice Man" was two legs up in the first set only for Taylor to level at 2–2 before Warriner took the deciding leg. Taylor won the next two sets and started the fourth with a 147 checkout. Although Warriner won the next leg, Taylor pulled away to win the match.

The battle of two former World Champions saw Richie Burnett beat Dennis Priestley – the Welshman had to hit a 117 checkout to tie the match at 1–1, which was possibly the turning point and Burnett went on to win 3–1.

=== Quarterfinals ===
John Part overcame Richie Burnett 3–1 in a match that wasn't necessarily reflected by the scoreline. Burnett came close to winning the first set having levelled it with a 137 finish. But Part won the decider. Even as Part looked to be coasting to victory at 2–0 in both sets and legs, Burnett put on a fightback to win 3 consecutive legs. Part held him off in the end for a 3–1 win.

Vegas-loving Wayne Mardle, took the first set against Ronnie Baxter – averaging 101 to Baxter's 94.30. Mardle then appeared to slow the game down which possibly affected both players. Baxter was possibly affected the most as he lost 0–3.

Steve Coote put up a valiant battle against Phil Taylor. The first set went to the deciding leg, and Coote held a 2–1 lead in the second – but Taylor always had the better of his opponent when it mattered and won the match 3–0.

Dennis Smith had been suffering from toothache throughout the tournament and combined with an in-form Kevin Painter was too much for "Smiffy" winning 3–1

=== Semifinals ===
Part was dogged by a failure to hit his doubles against Mardle in the semi. Neither player was outstanding, yet Mardle raced to a 3–0 lead. Despite a mini-fightback from the Canadian to win the 4th set, it was Mardle who went to the final a 4–1 winner.

Kevin Painter v Phil Taylor was a repeat of the World Final from January. Taylor started the better, with a 114 winning the first set. Painter levelled and both players traded blows to stay level at 2–2. Taylor then surged to win the fifth and sixth sets to claim his place in the final.

=== Final ===
Taylor and Mardle had exchanged some verbal battles in the run-up to the match. The match started with Taylor in fine form, a first set average of 104 gave him the set 3 legs to 1. Taylor also took the second and started the third set with a 10 dart leg – his average now at 103.0. Mardle fought back to win the next two legs, but after Mardle missed darts to close the gap to 2 sets to 1, Taylor stretched the lead to 3–0.

"Hawaii 501" began to hit back. He took the fourth set by 3 legs to 1 with a 12 dart leg for the set. Close again in the next set and Taylor checked out a 135 to go 2 legs to 1 up and then the next leg for the set and a 4 sets to 1 lead.

Mardle then began an amazing comeback. He took the sixth set to make it 2–4 and despite being 2 legs behind in the seventh set – three consecutive legs made it 3–4. His surge continued as he tied the match at 4–4 and the ninth set went to the deciding leg. Taylor kept his match average at 101 and won that crucial deciding leg for a 5–4 set lead and was then able to win the 10th set to clinch the title.
