= 1997 Malta Open darts =

Malta Open

Tournament information
- Dates: 1997
- Country: Malta
- Organisation(s): BDO, WDF, MDA
- Winner's share: Lm 500

Champion(s)
- (Cyprus) George Trypiniotis

1997 Malta Open was a darts tournament part of the annual, Malta Open, which took place in Malta in 1997.

== Results ==
| Round | Player |
|---|---|
| Winner | (Cyprus) George Trypiniotis |
| Final | (Malta) Godfrey Abela |
| Semi-finals | (Malta) Emmanuel Ciantar |
| Semi-finals | (England) Ted Hankey |
| Quarter-finals | (Malta) Vincent Busuttil |
| Quarter-finals | (Malta) Andy Keen |
| Quarter-finals | (Wales) Sean Palfrey |
| Quarter-finals | (Malta) Tony Demanuele |
