= 2012 UK Open Qualifier 2 =

UK Open Qualifier 2

Tournament information
- Dates: Sunday 12 February
- Venue: K2 Centre
- Location: Crawley
- Country: England
- Organisation(s): PDC
- Format: Best of 11 legs
- Prize fund: £34,600
- Winner's share: £6,000

Champion(s)
- (Netherlands) Michael van Gerwen

The 2012 UK Open Qualifier 2 was the second of eight 2012 UK Open Darts Qualifiers which was held at the K2 Centre in Crawley on Sunday 12 February.

== Prize money ==
Stage	Prize money (Total-£34,600)
Winner	£6,000
Runner Up	£3,000
Semi Final	£2,000
Quarter Final	£1,000
Fourth Round	£600
Third Round	£400
Second Round	£200
First Round	£0
Preliminary Round	£0

== Draw ==
Second round
(Scotland)	Robert Thornton	6
(Republic of Ireland)	Keith Rooney	2
(Netherlands)	Toon Greebe	3
(England)	Matthew Edgar	6
(Republic of Ireland)	Paddy Meaney	2
(England)	Johnny Haines	6
(England)	Dean Winstanley	6
(England)	Colin Monk	1
(England)	James Hubbard	4
(England)	John Bowles	6
(England)	James Wade	5
(England)	Alan Tabern	6
(England)	Mark Frost	4
(Wales)	Jamie Lewis	6
(Republic of Ireland)	Liam Kelly	4
(Netherlands)	Vincent van der Voort	6
(England)	Ted Hankey	6
(England)	John Scott	2
(Netherlands)	Roland Scholten	6
(England)	Ian White	4
(Northern Ireland)	Brendan Dolan	6
(England)	Chris Aubrey	1
(Scotland)	Gary Anderson	5
(England)	Wes Newton	6
(Spain)	Antonio Alcinas	5
(England)	Dave Chisnall	6
(Scotland)	Peter Wright	1
(England)	Steve Farmer	6
(England)	Steve Hine	6
(England)	Steve West	1
(Northern Ireland)	Michael Mansell	6
(Netherlands)	Jelle Klaasen	0
(England)	Kevin Painter	2
(Belgium)	Kim Huybrechts	6
(England)	Andrew Cornwall	0
(England)	Justin Pipe	6
(England)	Ross Smith	6
(England)	Darren Webster	4
(England)	Andy Hamilton	6
(England)	Dave Smith	1
(Netherlands)	Michael van Gerwen	6
(England)	Stuart Kellett	3
(England)	Richie Howson	6
(Republic of Ireland)	Mick McGowan	5
(Scotland)	James Young	1
(England)	Jamie Caven	6
(England)	Mark Walsh	3
(Canada)	John Part	6
(England)	Brian Woods	6
(England)	Mark Jones	4
(England)	Dave Ladley	1
(England)	Nigel Heydon	6
(Australia)	Simon Whitlock	6
(England)	Dave Honey	0
(England)	Joe Cullen	2
(England)	Shaun Griffiths	6
(England)	Andy Smith	6
(England)	Jimmy Mann	2
(England)	Peter Hudson	6
(England)	Kirk Shepherd	1
(England)	Kevin McDine	6
(England)	Gareth Cousins	3
(Scotland)	John Henderson	6
(England)	Mervyn King	5

Third round
(Scotland)	Robert Thornton	3
(England)	Matthew Edgar	6
(England)	Johnny Haines	6
(England)	Dean Winstanley	5
(England)	John Bowles	6
(England)	Alan Tabern	2
(Wales)	Jamie Lewis	0
(Netherlands)	Vincent van der Voort	6
(England)	Ted Hankey	1
(Netherlands)	Roland Scholten	6
(Northern Ireland)	Brendan Dolan	6
(England)	Wes Newton	5
(England)	Dave Chisnall	6
(England)	Steve Farmer	2
(England)	Steve Hine	3
(Northern Ireland)	Michael Mansell	6
(Belgium)	Kim Huybrechts	1
(England)	Justin Pipe	6
(England)	Ross Smith	4
(England)	Andy Hamilton	6
(Netherlands)	Michael van Gerwen	6
(England)	Richie Howson	3
(England)	Jamie Caven	6
(Canada)	John Part	5
(England)	Brian Woods	6
(England)	Nigel Heydon	5
(Australia)	Simon Whitlock	6
(England)	Shaun Griffiths	4
(England)	Andy Smith	6
(England)	Peter Hudson	2
(England)	Kevin McDine	6
(Scotland)	John Henderson	4

Fourth round
(England)	Matthew Edgar	3
(England)	Johnny Haines	6
(England)	John Bowles	5
(Netherlands)	Vincent van der Voort	6
(Netherlands)	Roland Scholten	6
(Northern Ireland)	Brendan Dolan	3
(England)	Dave Chisnall	6
(Northern Ireland)	Michael Mansell	4
(England)	Justin Pipe	5
(England)	Andy Hamilton	6
(Netherlands)	Michael van Gerwen	6
(England)	Jamie Caven	2
(England)	Brian Woods	5
(Australia)	Simon Whitlock	6
(England)	Andy Smith	6
(England)	Kevin McDine	2

Quarter-finals
(England)	Johnny Haines	5
(Netherlands)	Vincent van der Voort	6
(Netherlands)	Roland Scholten	1
(England)	Dave Chisnall	6
(England)	Andy Hamilton	2
(Netherlands)	Michael van Gerwen	6
(Australia)	Simon Whitlock	6
(England)	Andy Smith	1

Semi-finals
(Netherlands)	Vincent van der Voort	3
(England)	Dave Chisnall	6
(Netherlands)	Michael van Gerwen	6
(Australia)	Simon Whitlock	0

Final
(England)	Dave Chisnall	1
(Netherlands)	Michael van Gerwen	6
