= 1995 BDO World Darts Championship =

Tournament information
- Dates: 1–8 January 1995
- Venue: Lakeside Country Club
- Location: Frimley Green, Surrey
- Country: England, United Kingdom
- Organisation(s): BDO
- Format: Sets; Final – best of 11
- Prize fund: £143,000
- Winner's share: £34,000
- High checkout: 161 (England) Andy Fordham

Champion(s)
- (Wales) Richie Burnett

The 1995 BDO World Professional Darts Championship (known for sponsorship reasons as the 1995 Embassy World Darts Championship) was held from 1 to 8 January 1995 at the Lakeside Country Club in Frimley Green, Surrey. Richie Burnett became the second Welshman to be crowned World Champion after the inaugural winner Leighton Rees. Burnett defeated Dutchman Raymond van Barneveld 6 sets to 3 in the final. Defending champion John Part of Canada lost in the second round to qualifier Paul Williams.

This particular edition saw Peter Wright make his World Championship debut, where he would lose to Burnett in the first round. He eventually became world champion 25 years later by winning the 2020 PDC World Darts Championship.

== Seeds ==
1. (England) Steve Beaton
2. (Wales) Richie Burnett
3. (Canada) John Part
4. (England) Martin Adams
5. (England) Mike Gregory
6. (England) Andy Fordham
7. (Wales) Sean Palfrey
8. (England) Colin Monk

== Prize money ==
The prize money was £138,200.

Champion: £34,000
Runner-Up: £17,000
Semi-Finalists (2): £8,000
Quarter-Finalists (4): £4,000
Last 16 (8): £3,000
Last 32 (16): £1,950

There was also a 9 Dart Checkout prize of £52,000, along with a High Checkout prize of £1,600.

== The Results ==
First Round (best of 5 sets)
1	(England) Steve Beaton (85.47)	2
(England) Dave Askew (87.79)	3
(Netherlands) Raymond van Barneveld (90.81)	3
(Scotland) Les Wallace (94.74)	2
8	(England) Colin Monk (92.40)	3
(Netherlands) Roland Scholten (85.72)	1
(New Zealand) Peter Hunt (81.21)	3
(Belgium) Stefan Eeckelaert (78.48)	0
5	(England) Mike Gregory (89.61)	3
(Canada) Yves Chamberland (84.72)	2
(England) Ian Brand (91.50)	3
(Australia) Wayne Atkins (78.45)	0
4	(England) Martin Adams (89.40)	3
(Belgium) Bruno Raes (80.07)	1
(England) Kevin Painter (82.56)	3
(Sweden) Magnus Caris (82.59)	2
2	(Wales) Richie Burnett (90.57)	3
(England) Peter Wright (89.82)	1
(Australia) Russell Stewart (80.37)	3
(Scotland) Alan Brown (79.65)	2
7	(Wales) Sean Palfrey (86.34)	3
(England) Andy Jenkins (82.32)	1
(England) Paul Hogan (86.37)	3
(Denmark) Per Skau (81.93)	1
6	(England) Andy Fordham (88.71)	3
(England) Nicky Turner (86.76)	2
(Scotland) Ronnie Sharp (92.55)	3
(England) Bobby George (82.68)	0
3	(Canada) John Part (82.92)	3
(England) Paul Knighton (81.27)	2
(England) Paul Williams (90.75)	3
(Scotland) Bob Taylor (82.17)	0

Second Round (best of 5 sets)
(England) Dave Askew (84.12)	0
(Netherlands) Raymond van Barneveld (89.56)	3
8	(England) Colin Monk (94.23)	3
(New Zealand) Peter Hunt (85.58)	2
5	(England) Mike Gregory (90.42)	3
(England) Ian Brand (87.96)	2
4	(England) Martin Adams (94.29)	3
(England) Kevin Painter (84.96)	0
2	(Wales) Richie Burnett (90.54)	3
(Australia) Russell Stewart (86.88)	2
7	(Wales) Sean Palfrey (88.05)	0
(England) Paul Hogan (87.66)	3
6	(England) Andy Fordham (88.71)	3
(Scotland) Ronnie Sharp (85.47)	2
3	(Canada) John Part (86.25)	2
(England) Paul Williams (87.63)	3

Quarter-Finals (best of 7 sets)
(Netherlands) Raymond van Barneveld (91.77)	4
8	(England) Colin Monk (93.24)	2
5	(England) Mike Gregory (95.40)	3
4	(England) Martin Adams (91.23)	4
2	(Wales) Richie Burnett (91.32)	4
(England) Paul Hogan (88.32)	2
6	(England) Andy Fordham (94.11)	4
(England) Paul Williams (93.75)	2

Semi-Finals (best of 9 sets)
(Netherlands) Raymond van Barneveld (92.55)	5
4	(England) Martin Adams (93.03)	4
2	(Wales) Richie Burnett (89.04)	5
6	(England) Andy Fordham (90.33)	2

Final (best of 11 sets)
(Netherlands) Raymond van Barneveld (91.23)	3
2	(Wales) Richie Burnett (93.63)	6
