= Braulio Roncero =

Dutch darts player (1951–2018)

Personal information
- Born: 3 March 1951 Extremadura, Spain
- Died: 27 July 2018 (aged 67) Oss, Netherlands

Sport
- Sport: Darts
- Playing since: 1981
- Darts: 23g
- Laterality: Right-handed
- Walk-on music: "Red Red Wine" by UB40

Organisation (see split in darts)
- BDO: 1993–1998, 2010–2014
- PDC: 1999–2010

WDF major events – best performances
- World Championship: Last 32: 1998
- World Masters: Last 32: 1994

PDC premier events – best performances
- World Championship: Last 32: 2000

Other tournament wins
- Years
Catalonia International Open	2001
Benidorm Open	2010
Open Zuid West Nederland	2008

Braulio Roncero (3 March 1951 – 27 July 2018) was a Spanish-born Dutch professional darts player who played in Professional Darts Corporation (PDC) events.

== Career ==
From Extremadura, Spain. Roncero played in the 1994 Winmau World Masters, but who lost Andy Jenkins of England.

Roncero (whilst representing the Netherlands) played in one BDO World Darts Championships in 1998, losing 3–1 to Bobby George and played in one PDC World Darts Championships in 2000, losing 3–2 to Dennis Priestley.

Although he was Spanish by birth, Roncero played for the Dutch team. Here he played regularly with Raymond van Barneveld.

Roncero died on 27 July 2018.

== World Championship results ==
=== BDO ===
- 1998: Last 32: (lost to Bobby George 1–3) (sets)

=== PDC ===
- 2000: Last 32: (lost to Dennis Priestley 2–3)
