= 1994 World Masters (darts) =

The 1994 Winmau World Masters was held on 3 December 1994. Richie Burnett won the tournament by beating Steve Beaton in the final.

== Men's tournament ==
=== Top 16 seeds ===
1. (England) Steve Beaton
2. (Wales) Richie Burnett
3. (Canada) John Part
4. (England) Martin Adams
5. (England) Mike Gregory
6. (England) Andy Fordham
7. (England) Dave Askew
8. (England) Colin Monk
9. (Netherlands) Roland Scholten
10. (Netherlands) Raymond van Barneveld
11. (England) Kevin Painter
12. (Denmark) Per Skau
13. (Scotland) Alan Brown
14. (Scotland) Bob Taylor
15. (England) Andy Jenkins
16. (Scotland) Les Wallace

=== Draw ===
Players in bold denote match winners.

**Last 32**
1	(England) **Steve Beaton**	**2**
(Gibraltar) George Federico	0
16	(Scotland) **Les Wallace**	**2**
(Wales) Eric Burden	0
8	(England) Colin Monk	1
(Wales) **Derek Hampton**	**2**
9	(Netherlands) **Roland Scholten**	**2**
(Belgium) Stefan Eeckelaert	1
5	(England) **Mike Gregory**	**2**
(England) Dennis Harbour	1
12	(Denmark) Per Skau	0
(Northern Ireland) **Louis Doherty**	**2**
4	(England) **Martin Adams**	**2**
(Canada) Blaine Ogden	0
(England) Nicky Turner	1
(Wales) **Mark Salmon**	**2**
2	(Wales) **Richie Burnett**	**2**
(England) Denis Ovens	1
15	(England) **Andy Jenkins**	**2**
(Netherlands) Braulio Roncero	0
7	(England) Dave Askew	0
(Norway) **Helge Knapskog**	**2**
10	(Netherlands) **Raymond van Barneveld**	**2**
(Wales) Martin Phillips	0
6	(England) **Andy Fordham**	**2**
(England) Mervyn King	0
11	(England) **Kevin Painter**	**2**
(England) Vijay Kumar	0
3	(Canada) John Part	0
(Germany) **Andreas Krockel**	**2**
14	(Scotland) Bob Taylor	1
(England) **Paul Williams**	**2**

**Last 16**
1	(England) **Steve Beaton**	**2**
16	(Scotland) Les Wallace	1
(Wales) Derek Hampton	0
9	(Netherlands) **Roland Scholten**	**2**
5	(England) Mike Gregory	1
(Northern Ireland) **Louis Doherty**	**2**
4	(England) **Martin Adams**	**2**
(Wales) Mark Salmon	1
2	(Wales) **Richie Burnett**	**2**
15	(England) Andy Jenkins	1
(Norway) **Helge Knapskog**	**2**
10	(Netherlands) Raymond van Barneveld	1
6	(England) **Andy Fordham**	**2**
11	(England) Kevin Painter	1
(Germany) Andreas Krockel	0
(England) **Paul Williams**	**2**

**Quarter-finals**
1	(England) **Steve Beaton**	**3**
9	(Netherlands) Roland Scholten	1
(Northern Ireland) Louis Doherty	0
4	(England) **Martin Adams**	**3**
2	(Wales) **Richie Burnett**	**3**
(Norway) Helge Knapskog	1
6	(England) **Andy Fordham**	**3**
(England) Paul Williams	1

**Semi-finals**
1	(England) **Steve Beaton 100.25**	**3**
4	(England) Martin Adams	2
2	(Wales) **Richie Burnett**	**3**
6	(England) Andy Fordham	2

**Final**
1	(England) Steve Beaton	2
2	(Wales) **Richie Burnett**	**3**

== Youth's tournament ==
=== Preliminary round ===
- (Australia) Andrew Pollard 1–3 (United States) Barry Russell
- (England) Robert Pascall 3–0 (Finland) Ilkka Kovanen
- (Wales) Vincent Barrett 3–2 (Austria) Kurt Bradac
- (Scotland) Paul Littlejohns 0–3 (Denmark) Brian Sorensen
- (France) Chris Grelat 1–3 (Germany) Karsten Wieggrebe
- (Belgium) Cindy Jonckheere 0–3 (England) Nick Buckingham
- (England) Peter Mainhardt 3–2 (Malta) Gordon Stanmore
- (Italy) Simon Colomban 3–0 (Northern Ireland) Paul McShannock
- (Finland) Minna Niemineu 0–3 (England) Alan Sutch
- (Belgium) Steven de Brucker 3–2 (South Africa) Joel Olweny
- (England) Martin Whatmough 3–1 (Brazil) Dafne Barbalho
- (Scotland) Alan Soutar 3–0 (Latvia) Ivars Skesters
- (Bulgaria) Stefan Stoev 3–1 (Australia) Jeremy Fagg
- (Canada) Peter Kelloway 3–2 (Australia) Barry Jouannet
- (England) Lee Palfreyman 3–1 (Finland) Marko Pusa
- (Netherlands) Arjan Moen 3–0 (Uganda) Denis Ojok

=== Last 32 ===
- (Czech Republic) Ondres Veselovsky bye (Bulgaria) Stefan Stoev
- (Latvia) Evija Sulce 0–3 (United States) Barry Russell
- (England) Robert Pascall 3–2 (Wales) Vincent Barrett
- (Brazil) Jorge Henrique 3–1 (Uganda) Harriet Wakooli
- (England) Daniel Harrington 0–3 (Netherlands) Arjan Moen
- (Spain) Rafael Carmona 2–3 (Denmark) Brian Sorensen
- (Germany) Karsten Wieggrebe 0–3 (England) Nick Buckingham
- (Canada) Peter Kelloway 3–0 (Norway) Bill-Tore Ingles
- (England) Nigel Russell 3–0 (Slovakia) Samuel Szunyog
- (Czech Republic) Lucie Tomancova 2–3 (England) Peter Mainhardt
- (Italy) Simon Colomban 0–3 (England) Alan Sutch
- (England) Matt Chapman 3-2 (Netherlands) Mieke de Boer
- (France) Emilie Levillain 0–3 (Wales) David Pearce
- (England) Martin Harris 1–3 (Belgium) Steven de Brucker
- (England) Martin Whatmough 2–3 (Scotland) Alan Soutar
- (Canada) Crystal Keer 0–3 (England) Lee Palfreyman

=== Last 16 ===
- (England) Lee Palfreyman 3–0 (Czech Republic) Ondres Veselovsky
- (United States) Barry Russell 0–3 (England) Robert Pascall
- (Brazil) Jorge Henrique 1–3 (Netherlands) Arjan Moen
- (Denmark) Brian Sorensen 0–3 (England) Nick Buckingham
- (Canada) Peter Kelloway 3–1 (England) Nigel Russell
- (England) Peter Mainhardt 3–1 (England) Alan Sutch
- (England) Matt Chapman 3–1 (Wales) David Pearce
- (Belgium) Steven de Brucker 3–1 (Scotland) Alan Soutar

=== Quarter-finals ===
- (England) Lee Palfreyman 3–1 (England) Robert Pascall
- (Netherlands) Arjan Moen 3–2 (England) Nick Buckingham
- (Canada) Peter Kelloway 3–0 (England) Peter Mainhardt
- (England) Matt Chapman 1–3 (Belgium) Steven de Brucker

=== Semi-finals ===
- (England) Lee Palfreyman 3–2 (Netherlands) Arjan Moen
- (Canada) Peter Kelloway 1–3 (Belgium) Steven de Brucker

=== Final ===
best of 5 legs

- (England) Lee Palfreyman 0–3 (Belgium) Steven de Brucker
