= 1999 Malta Open darts =

Malta Open

Tournament information
- Dates: 12 November 1999
- Country: Malta
- Organisation(s): BDO, WDF, MDA
- Winner's share: Lm 500

Champion(s)
- (Wales) Sean Palfrey

1999 Malta Open is a darts tournament part of the annual, Malta Open, which took place in Malta in 1999.

== Results ==
Round	Player
Winner	(Wales) Sean Palfrey
Final	(England) Terry Adoltho
Semi-finals	(England) Andy Foden
Semi-finals	(Cyprus) Marios Demetriou
Quarter-finals	(England) Frank Skillen
Quarter-finals	(England) Andy Keen
Quarter-finals	(Malta) Felix Zerri
Quarter-finals	(Malta) Paul Sammat
