= 1998 Malta Open darts =

Malta Open

Tournament information
- Dates: 12 November 1998
- Country: Malta
- Organisation(s): BDO, WDF, MDA
- Winner's share: Lm 500

Champion(s)
- (England) Gary Spedding

1998 Malta Open was a darts tournament part of the annual, Malta Open, which took place in Malta in 1998.

== Results ==
Round	Player
Winner	(England) Gary Spedding
Final	(Sweden) Gunnar Glaso
Semi Final	(England) John Walton
Semi Final	(Malta) Andy Keen
Quarter Final	(England) Ted Hankey
Quarter Final	(England) Tony Littleton
Quarter Final	(Malta) Vincent Busuttil
Quarter Final	(Wales) Sean Palfrey
