= John Bowles (darts player) =

English darts player

Personal information
- Nicknames: "Bulldog", "Double Hood"
- Born: 26 May 1967 (age 59) England
- Home town: Widnes, Cheshire, England

Sport
- Sport: Darts
- Playing since: 1990
- Darts: 26 Gram Target
- Laterality: Right-handed
- Walk-on music: "Gangnam Style" by Psy

Organisation (see split in darts)
- PDC: 2010–

PDC premier events – best performances
- World Championship: Last 32: 2013
- UK Open: Last 16: 2011

Other tournament wins
- Years
Tarporley Open	2010

John Bowles (born 26 May 1967) is an English professional darts player who plays in Professional Darts Corporation (PDC) events. He has twice come through Q School to play on the tour. He is best known for hitting a double "Robin Hood" on live television.

== Career ==
Bowles made his television debut at the 2011 UK Open at the Reebok Stadium in Bolton as a pub qualifier. He defeated Peter Manley, Devon Petersen, Justin Pipe and Steve Beaton before losing 4–9 to Dave Chisnall in the last 16 earning himself £4,000 in the process. That year was the furthest a pub qualifier has gone in the history of the UK Open sharing the feat with Andy Boulton.

He won a two-year PDC Pro Tour card in 2012 via Q School. His best results of 2012 were last 16 defeats in the second UK Open Qualifier and the sixth Players Championship, losing to Vincent van der Voort 5–6 on both occasions. He also lost in the last 96 of the UK Open 1–4 to Nigel Heydon.

In November 2012, Bowles won six games to reach the final of the PDC World Championship qualifier, where he lost 1–5 to Stuart Kellett. However, his run to the final earned him a spot in the preliminary round in what was his first appearance at the World Championship. He beat Spain's Carlos Rodríguez by four legs to two in the preliminary round and then came from 1–2 down in sets against Jamie Caven to win 3–2. Bowles cited a 121 checkout to win the fourth set as the key to winning the match. He played fourth seed Gary Anderson in the second round and lost 3–4 in sets in an extremely close match. Bowles missed one dart at double 20 in three separate legs to reach the last 16. After the tournament Bowles was ranked world number 64. He reached his first PDC semi-final in the sixth 2013 UK Open Qualifier in April, having defeated the likes of Mervyn King (with an average of 108) and Brendan Dolan, but lost 3–6 to Kim Huybrechts. This result helped him finish 22nd on the UK Open Order of Merit to enter the competition at the third round stage, where he beat Paul Nicholson 9–5. He played Terry Temple in the next round and lost 7–9. He reached the last 16 once during the rest of the year, at the seventh Players Championship, in a run that included a 6–0 whitewash over Andy Hamilton before he lost 6–4 to Peter Wright. Bowles missed out on reaching the 2014 World Championship by just £650 on the ProTour Order of Merit.

Bowles' ranking increased by 14 places in 2013 to begin 2014 world number 50. He lost 5–1 to Dirk van Duijvenbode in the second round of the UK Open. Bowles had his best results in Players Championship events, losing in the last 16 of two events, before reaching the quarter-finals of the 19th tournament with wins over Stuart Kellett, Mervyn King, Andy Smith and Vincent van der Voort. He faced Brendan Dolan and was edged out 6–5.

Bowles lost his prize money from the 2013 World Championship on the Order of Merit at the beginning of 2015, which was largely the reason which saw him drop to world number 61, still inside the top 64 who retain their tour cards. He qualified for the 2015 German Darts Championship and beat Chris Aubrey 6–2, before losing 6–3 to Steve Beaton in the second round. Bowles played in the UK Open for the sixth successive year, but lost 5–2 to Steve Douglas in the first round. Bowles could only reach the last 16 of one tournament this year, which came at the 11th Players Championship and he was beaten 6–1 by Nigel Heydon.

Bowles was ranked 73rd on the PDC Order of Merit after the 2016 World Championship, meaning he had to enter Q School to win his place back. He was successful at the first attempt and stated that he was looking to add more consistency to his game and hoped that the darts room he had built at his house would help him do this. He failed to qualify for the 2016 UK Open, but did make the German Darts Masters and saw off Fabian Herz 6–3 in the first round, before losing 6–4 to Adrian Lewis. Bowles' best run of the year was at the 8th Players Championship event where he ousted Devon Petersen, Alan Norris and Berry van Peer in advancing to the last 16. He was beaten 6–1 by Dave Chisnall.

Bowles won through to the final round of the qualifier for the 2017 World Championship, but lost 5–0 to Kevin Simm. This was still enough to win a place in the preliminary round and he was beaten 2–0 by David Platt, losing both sets in deciding legs.

== Personal life ==
Whilst playing amateur rugby league for local club Simms Cross, Bowles suffered a serious broken arm leaving him with metal screws holding his arm together. Bowles is a builder by trade.

== World Championship results ==
=== PDC ===
- 2013: Second round (lost to Gary Anderson 3–4)
- 2017: Preliminary round (lost to David Platt 0–2)
