= 2013 Championship League Darts =

Championship League Darts

Tournament information
- Dates: September 24 – October 24
- Venue: Crondon Park Golf Club
- Location: Stock, Essex
- Country: England
- Organisation(s): PDC
- Format: Legs
- Prize fund: £200,000
- Nine-dart finish: (England) Phil Taylor (England) Mervyn King (Netherlands) Michael van Gerwen

Champion(s)
- (England) Phil Taylor

The 2013 Championship League Darts was the sixth and last edition of a darts competition — the Championship League Darts. The competition was organised and held by the Professional Darts Corporation, with the 2013 edition having a prize fund over £200,000.

The format of the tournament is similar to the Premier League Darts tournament, also organized by the PDC, except it is contested by a larger pool of players who are split up into a number of groups. Phil Taylor was the defending champion and won his fourth Championship League title with a 6–3 defeat over Michael van Gerwen in the final.

== Format ==
The first group consists of the top eight players from the PDC Order of Merit. These eight players will play each other over the course of a day, receiving two points for each win. All matches were contested over a maximum of 11 legs with a player winning the match on reaching six legs. After all players play each other, the four players with the most points will progress to the semi-finals with the winners of those matches progressing into the final.

The winner of the final advances to the winners group which will take place at the end of the competition. The runner-up, losing semi-finalists and the players finishing fifth and sixth move into group two, where they will be joined by the next three players in the Order of Merit. The format of the second group was the same as the first group with players moving into the third group. In total there are eight groups before the final group takes place.

This format ensures that all players who do not win the group or finish in the last two positions have another chance to qualify for the winners group.

== Prize money ==
The Championship League Darts awards prize money per leg won, as well as to the eventual winner, runner-up and semi-finalists of the entire tournament.
The amount of prize money awarded per leg won is:

Stage	Match	Prize money per leg won
Group stage	Group matches	£50
Group stage	Semi-finals & final	£100
Winners group	Group matches	£100
Winners group	Semi-finals & final	£200

The amount of prize money awarded to the winner, runner-up and semi-finalists of the tournament is:

Stage	Prize money
Winner	£10,000
Runner-up	£5,000
Semi-finalists	£2,500

== Tournament dates ==
The tournament takes place over nine days throughout September and October 2013. One group is played on each day. The dates are as follows:

- Group 1 – Tuesday, September 24
- Group 2 – Wednesday, September 25
- Group 3 – Thursday, September 26
- Group 4 – Tuesday, October 15
- Group 5 – Wednesday, October 16
- Group 6 – Thursday, October 17
- Group 7 – Tuesday, October 22
- Group 8 – Wednesday, October 23
- Winners Group – Thursday, October 24

The tournament takes place at the Crondon Park Golf Club in Essex.

Group 1

- (England) Phil Taylor (1)
- (Netherlands) Michael van Gerwen (2)
- (England) Adrian Lewis (3)
- (Australia) Simon Whitlock (4)
- (England) James Wade (5)
- (England) Andy Hamilton (6)
- (England) Dave Chisnall (7)
- (England) Wes Newton (8)

Group 2

- (Netherlands) Michael van Gerwen (2)
- (England) Adrian Lewis (3)
- (England) Andy Hamilton (6)
- (England) Dave Chisnall (7)
- (England) Wes Newton (8)
- (England) Justin Pipe (9)
- (Scotland) Robert Thornton (11)
- (England) Kevin Painter (12)

Group 3

- (Netherlands) Michael van Gerwen (2)
- (England) Adrian Lewis (3)
- (England) Dave Chisnall (7)
- (England) Wes Newton (8)
- (England) Kevin Painter (12)
- (England) Mervyn King (13)
- (Northern Ireland) Brendan Dolan (14)
- (Belgium) Kim Huybrechts (15)

Group 4

- (Netherlands) Michael van Gerwen (2)
- (England) Dave Chisnall (7)
- (England) Kevin Painter (12)
- (England) Mervyn King (13)
- (Belgium) Kim Huybrechts (15)
- (England) Terry Jenkins (16)
- (Scotland) Peter Wright (17)
- (Scotland) Gary Anderson (18)

Group 5

- (Netherlands) Michael van Gerwen (2)
- (England) Mervyn King (13)
- (Belgium) Kim Huybrechts (15)
- (Scotland) Peter Wright (17)
- (Scotland) Gary Anderson (18)
- (Australia) Paul Nicholson (19)
- (England) Ronnie Baxter (20)
- (Wales) Mark Webster (21)

Group 6

- (England) Mervyn King (13)
- (Belgium) Kim Huybrechts (15)
- (Scotland) Peter Wright (17)
- (Scotland) Gary Anderson (18)
- (Australia) Paul Nicholson (19)
- (England) Colin Lloyd (22)
- (England) Ian White (23)
- (England) Jamie Caven (24)

Group 7

- (Belgium) Kim Huybrechts (15)
- (Scotland) Peter Wright (17)
- (Scotland) Gary Anderson (18)
- (Australia) Paul Nicholson (19)
- (England) Jamie Caven (24)
- (Wales) Richie Burnett (25)
- (Canada) John Part (26)
- (England) Steve Beaton (27)

Group 8

- (Belgium) Kim Huybrechts (15)
- (Scotland) Peter Wright (17)
- (Scotland) Gary Anderson (18)
- (Australia) Paul Nicholson (19)
- (England) Steve Beaton (27)
- (England) Andy Smith (28)
- (England) Mark Walsh (30)
- (England) Colin Osborne (31)

Note: (Netherlands) Raymond van Barneveld (10) and (Netherlands) Vincent van der Voort (29) chose not to compete in the tournament.

Winners Group

- (England) Phil Taylor (1)
- (Netherlands) Michael van Gerwen (2)
- (England) Andy Hamilton (6)
- (England) Wes Newton (8)
- (Belgium) Kim Huybrechts (15)
- (England) Terry Jenkins (16)
- (England) Ian White (23)
- (Wales) Richie Burnett (25)

== Group stage ==
=== Group 1 ===
Played on Tuesday 24 September and was won by Phil Taylor. He also hit a nine-dart finish during a 6–5 league stage defeat to Adrian Lewis. Simon Whitlock and James Wade were eliminated.

		Tay	Lew	Chi	New	Ham	MVG	Whi	Wad	Points, Legs
1	(England) Phil Taylor		5–6	6–5	6–2	4–6	6–2	6–3	6–4	10, 39–28
2	(England) Adrian Lewis	6–5		6–3	6–5	4–6	6–4	6–1	4–6	10, 38–30
3	(England) Dave Chisnall	5–6	3–6		3–6	6–0	6–2	6–4	6–1	8, 35–25
4	(England) Wes Newton	2–6	5–6	6–3		6–5	2–6	6–4	6–4	8, 33–34
5	(England) Andy Hamilton	6–4	6–4	0–6	5–6		4–6	6–4	6–4	8, 33–34
6	(Netherlands) Michael van Gerwen	2–6	4–6	2–6	6–2	6–4		6–5	6–4	8, 32–33
7	(Australia) Simon Whitlock	3–6	1–6	4–6	4–6	4–6	5–6		6–1	2, 27–37
8	(England) James Wade	4–6	6–4	1–6	4–6	4–6	4–6	1–6		2, 24–40

Semi-finals
1	(England) Phil Taylor	6
4	(England) Wes Newton	2
2	(England) Adrian Lewis	6
3	(England) Dave Chisnall	2

Final
1	(England) Phil Taylor	6
2	(England) Adrian Lewis	2

=== Group 2 ===
Played on Wednesday 25 September and was won by Andy Hamilton. Robert Thornton and Justin Pipe were eliminated.

		Chi	Ham	Lew	MVG	Pai	New	Tho	Pip	Points, Legs
1	(England) Dave Chisnall		5–6	6–3	6–4	5–6	6–2	6–4	6–1	10, 40–26
2	(England) Andy Hamilton	6–5		2–6	6–4	6–2	6–2	3–6	6–5	10, 35–30
3	(England) Adrian Lewis	3–6	6–2		6–4	1–6	6–4	6–5	6–2	10, 34–29
4	(Netherlands) Michael van Gerwen	4–6	4–6	4–6		6–1	6–2	6–5	6–1	8, 36–27
5	(England) Kevin Painter	6–5	2–6	6–1	1–6		4–6	6–5	6–5	8, 31–34
6	(England) Wes Newton	2–6	2–6	4–6	2–6	6–4		6–4	6–5	6, 28–37
7	(Scotland) Robert Thornton	4–6	6–3	5–6	5–6	5–6	4–6		6–3	4, 35–36
8	(England) Justin Pipe	1–6	5–6	2–6	1–6	5–6	5–6	3–6		0, 22–42

Semi-finals
1	(England) Dave Chisnall	3
4	(Netherlands) Michael van Gerwen	6
2	(England) Andy Hamilton	6
3	(England) Adrian Lewis	2

Final
4	(Netherlands) Michael van Gerwen	5
2	(England) Andy Hamilton	6

=== Group 3 ===
Played on Thursday 26 September and was won by Wes Newton. Brendan Dolan and Adrian Lewis were eliminated.

		MVG	Huy	New	Chi	Kin	Pai	Dol	Lew	Points, Legs
1	(Netherlands) Michael van Gerwen		4–6	6–3	6–1	6–0	6–1	6–5	6–2	12, 40–18
2	(Belgium) Kim Huybrechts	6–4		2–6	6–5	6–4	6–2	6–4	6–3	12, 38–28
3	(England) Wes Newton	3–6	6–2		6–4	3–6	5–6	6–4	6–5	8, 35–33
4	(England) Dave Chisnall	1–6	5–6	4–6		1–6	6–1	6–2	6–1	6, 29–28
5	(England) Mervyn King	0–6	4–6	6–3	6–1		6–4	5–6	6–5	6, 31–33
6	(England) Kevin Painter	1–6	2–6	6–5	1–6	6–4		6–4	1–6	6, 23–37
7	(Northern Ireland) Brendan Dolan	5–6	4–6	4–6	2–6	6–5	4–6		6–4	4, 31–39
8	(England) Adrian Lewis	2–6	3–6	5–6	1–6	5–6	6–1	4–6		2, 26–37

Semi-finals
1	(Netherlands) Michael van Gerwen	4
4	(England) Dave Chisnall	6
2	(Belgium) Kim Huybrechts	3
3	(England) Wes Newton	6

Final
4	(England) Dave Chisnall	4
3	(England) Wes Newton	6

=== Group 4 ===
Played on Tuesday 15 October and was won by Terry Jenkins. Mervyn King and Michael van Gerwen threw nine-dart finishes during the day. Dave Chisnall and Kevin Painter were eliminated.

		Jen	MVG	Wri	And	Huy	Kin	Chi	Pai	Points, Legs
1	(England) Terry Jenkins		6–4	3–6	6–3	6–3	6–1	6–2	6–4	12, 39–23
2	(Netherlands) Michael van Gerwen	4–6		6–5	6–4	6–3	5–6	6–0	6–5	10, 39–29
3	(Scotland) Peter Wright	6–3	5–6		6–5	6–1	3–6	6–3	5–6	8, 37–30
4	(Scotland) Gary Anderson	3–6	4–6	5–6		5–6	6–4	6–5	6–4	6, 35–37
5	(Belgium) Kim Huybrechts	3–6	3–6	1–6	6–5		6–1	5–6	6–2	6, 30–32
6	(England) Mervyn King	1–6	6–5	6–3	4–6	1–6		6–4	2–6	6, 26–36
7	(England) Dave Chisnall	2–6	0–6	3–6	5–6	6–5	4–6		6–0	4, 26–35
8	(England) Kevin Painter	4–6	5–6	6–5	4–6	2–6	6–2	0–6		4, 27–37

Semi-finals
1	(England) Terry Jenkins	6
4	(Scotland) Gary Anderson	1
2	(Netherlands) Michael van Gerwen	6
3	(Scotland) Peter Wright	4

Final
1	(England) Terry Jenkins	6
2	(Netherlands) Michael van Gerwen	5

=== Group 5 ===
Played on Wednesday 16 October and was won by Michael van Gerwen. Mark Webster and Ronnie Baxter were eliminated.

		Wri	MVG	Kin	And	Huy	Nic	Web	Bax	Points, Legs
1	(Scotland) Peter Wright		6–4	6–3	6–2	6–4	6–2	6–5	5–6	12, 41–26
2	(Netherlands) Michael van Gerwen	4–6		6–4	5–6	6–3	6–2	6–3	6–2	10, 39–26
3	(England) Mervyn King	3–6	4–6		6–4	6–4	6–5	5–6	6–1	8, 36–32
4	(Scotland) Gary Anderson	2–6	6–5	4–6		6–5	6–5	6–4	2–6	8, 32–37
5	(Belgium) Kim Huybrechts	4–6	3–6	4–6	5–6		6–3	6–2	6–3	6, 34–32
6	(Australia) Paul Nicholson	2–6	2–6	5–6	5–6	3–6		6–1	6–2	4, 29–33
7	(Wales) Mark Webster	5–6	3–6	6–5	4–6	2–6	1–6		6–4	4, 27–39
8	(England) Ronnie Baxter	6–5	2–6	1–6	6–2	3–6	2–6	4–6		4, 24–37

Semi-finals
1	(Scotland) Peter Wright	6
4	(Scotland) Gary Anderson	3
2	(Netherlands) Michael van Gerwen	6
3	(England) Mervyn King	4

Final
1	(Scotland) Peter Wright	4
2	(Netherlands) Michael van Gerwen	6

=== Group 6 ===
Played on Thursday 17 October and was won by Ian White. Kim Huybrechts threw a nine-darter in the league stage. Mervyn King and Colin Lloyd were eliminated.

		Nic	Huy	Wri	Whi	And	Cav	Kin	Lyd	Points, Legs
1	(Australia) Paul Nicholson		5–6	6–4	6–4	6–2	6–4	3–6	6–3	10, 38–29
2	(Belgium) Kim Huybrechts	6–5		5–6	6–1	5–6	5–6	6–2	6–3	8, 39–29
3	(Scotland) Peter Wright	4–6	6–5		5–6	6–4	2–6	6–4	6–2	8, 35–33
4	(England) Ian White	4–6	1–6	6–5		4–6	6–5	6–3	6–2	8, 33–33
5	(Scotland) Gary Anderson	2–6	6–5	4–6	6–4		6–4	6–4	4–6	8, 34–35
6	(England) Jamie Caven	4–6	6–5	6–2	5–6	4–6		5–6	6–3	6, 36–34
7	(England) Mervyn King	6–3	2–6	4–6	3–6	4–6	6–5		5–6	4, 30–38
8	(England) Colin Lloyd	3–6	3–6	2–6	2–6	6–4	3–6	6–5		4, 25–39

Semi-finals
1	(Australia) Paul Nicholson	4
4	(England) Ian White	6
2	(Belgium) Kim Huybrechts	3
3	(Scotland) Peter Wright	6

Final
4	(England) Ian White	6
3	(Scotland) Peter Wright	4

=== Group 7 ===
Played on Tuesday 22 October and was won by Richie Burnett. Jamie Caven and John Part were eliminated.

		Bur	Bea	And	Huy	Wri	Nic	Cav	Par	Points, Legs
1	(Wales) Richie Burnett		3–6	2–6	6–5	6–3	6–0	6–4	6–3	10, 35–27
2	(England) Steve Beaton	6–3		4–6	6–3	6–3	6–4	6–5	3–6	10, 37–30
3	(Scotland) Gary Anderson	6–2	6–4		4–6	5–6	2–6	6–3	6–1	8, 35–28
4	(Belgium) Kim Huybrechts	5–6	3–6	6–4		4–6	6–3	6–4	6–1	8, 36–30
5	(Scotland) Peter Wright	3–6	3–6	6–5	6–4		5–6	6–5	6–2	8, 35–34
6	(Australia) Paul Nicholson	0–6	4–6	6–2	3–6	6–5		6–2	6–3	8, 31–30
7	(England) Jamie Caven	4–6	5–6	3–6	4–6	5–6	2–6		6–4	2, 29–40
8	(Canada) John Part	3–6	6–3	1–6	1–6	2–6	3–6	4–6		2, 20–39

Semi-finals
1	(Wales) Richie Burnett	6
4	(Belgium) Kim Huybrechts	3
2	(England) Steve Beaton	3
3	(Scotland) Gary Anderson	6

Final
1	(Wales) Richie Burnett	6
3	(Scotland) Gary Anderson	5

=== Group 8 ===
Played on Wednesday 23 October and was won by Kim Huybrechts. Colin Osborne and Mark Walsh were eliminated.

		Nic	Smi	Wri	Huy	And	Bea	Osb	Wal	Points, Legs
1	(Australia) Paul Nicholson		6–1	6–3	6–2	3–6	6–4	6–4	6–2	12, 39–22
2	(England) Andy Smith	1–6		6–5	6–4	6–3	6–0	6–1	6–2	12, 37–21
3	(Scotland) Peter Wright	3–6	5–6		6–4	6–4	6–4	5–6	6–4	8, 37–34
4	(Belgium) Kim Huybrechts	2–6	4–6	4–6		6–4	5–6	6–1	6–2	6, 33–32
5	(Scotland) Gary Anderson	6–3	3–6	4–6	4–6		3–6	6–2	6–5	6, 32–34
6	(England) Steve Beaton	4–6	0–6	4–6	6–5	6–3		6–4	2–6	6, 28–36
7	(England) Colin Osborne	4–6	1–6	6–5	1–6	2–6	4–6		6–5	4, 29–40
8	(England) Mark Walsh	2–6	2–6	4–6	2–6	5–6	6–2	5–6		2, 27–38

Semi-finals
1	(Australia) Paul Nicholson	3
4	(Belgium) Kim Huybrechts	6
2	(England) Andy Smith	1
3	(Scotland) Peter Wright	6

Final
1	(Belgium) Kim Huybrechts	6
3	(Scotland) Peter Wright	4

== Winners Group ==
Played on 24 October and was won by Phil Taylor.

		Tay	MvG	Bur	New	Whi	Huy	Ham	Jen	Points, Legs
1	(England) Phil Taylor		3–6	6–3	6–4	6–5	6–5	6–5	6–5	12, 39–33
2	(Netherlands) Michael van Gerwen	6–3		0–6	6–5	6–4	3–6	6–1	6–2	10, 33–27
3	(Wales) Richie Burnett	3–6	6–0		5–6	0–6	6–3	6–2	6–5	8, 32–28
4	(England) Wes Newton	4–6	5–6	6–5		4–6	6–2	6–4	6–5	8, 37–34
5	(England) Ian White	5–6	4–6	6–0	6–4		6–5	5–6	3–6	6, 35–33
6	(Belgium) Kim Huybrechts	5–6	6–3	3–6	2–6	5–6		6–3	6–3	6, 33–33
7	(England) Andy Hamilton	5–6	1–6	2–6	4–6	6–5	3–6		6–5	4, 27–40
8	(England) Terry Jenkins	5–6	2–6	5–6	5–6	6–3	3–6	5–6		2, 31–39

Semi-finals
1	(England) Phil Taylor	6
4	(England) Wes Newton	1
2	(Netherlands) Michael van Gerwen	6
3	(Wales) Richie Burnett	2

Final
1	(England) Phil Taylor	6
2	(Netherlands) Michael van Gerwen	3
