= 2013 UK Masters =

Tournament information
- Dates: 8–10 March 2013
- Venue: Butlin's
- Location: Minehead
- Country: England
- Organisation(s): Professional Darts Corporation (PDC)
- Format: Legs; First to 6 legs
- Prize fund: £100,000
- Winner's share: £20,000

Champion(s)
- John Part

The 2013 UK Masters was the first of eight PDC European Tour events on the 2013 PDC Pro Tour. The tournament took place at Butlin's in Minehead, England, from 8–10 March 2013. It featured a field of 64 players and £100,000 in prize money, with £20,000 going to the winner.

John Part won his first European Tour title and first ranking title in 18 months by defeating Stuart Kellett 6–4 in the final.

== Prize money ==
Stage (num. of players)		Prize money
Winner	(1)	£20,000
Runner-up	(1)	£10,000
Semi-finalists	(2)	£5,000
Quarter-finalists	(4)	£3,000
Third round losers	(8)	£2,000
Second round losers	(16)	£1,000
First round losers	(32)	£500
Total	£100,000	

== Qualification ==
The top 32 players from the PDC ProTour Order of Merit on the 29 January 2013 automatically qualified for the event. The remaining 32 places went to players from two qualifying events - 24 from the UK Qualifier (held in Crawley on 22 February), and eight from the European Qualifier (held in Hamburg on 31 January).

1–32

1. (England) Dave Chisnall (third round)
2. (Australia) Simon Whitlock (quarter-finals)
3. (Netherlands) Michael van Gerwen (third round)
4. (Netherlands) Raymond van Barneveld (third round)
5. (England) Phil Taylor (quarter-finals)
6. (England) Wes Newton (second round)
7. (England) Justin Pipe (first round)
8. (England) Ian White (first round)
9. (Scotland) Robert Thornton (quarter-finals)
10. (Belgium) Kim Huybrechts (first round)
11. (England) Adrian Lewis (semi-finals)
12. (England) Terry Jenkins (second round)
13. (England) Andy Hamilton (semi-finals)
14. (England) James Wade (quarter-finals)
15. (England) Ronnie Baxter (third round)
16. (England) Colin Lloyd (second round)
17. (Scotland) Peter Wright (first round)
18. (England) Andy Smith (second round)
19. (England) Mervyn King (second round)
20. (Northern Ireland) Brendan Dolan (second round)
21. (Wales) Richie Burnett (third round)
22. (Australia) Paul Nicholson (first round)
23. (Scotland) Gary Anderson (second round)
24. (Netherlands) Vincent van der Voort (first round)
25. (England) Mark Walsh (second round)
26. (England) Colin Osborne (first round)
27. (Wales) Mark Webster (third round)
28. (England) Jamie Caven (second round)
29. (England) Kevin Painter (second round)
30. (England) Steve Beaton (first round)
31. (England) Wayne Jones (second round)
32. (England) James Hubbard (first round)

UK Qualifier

- (England) Adam Hunt (first round)
- (England) Simon Craven (first round)
- (England) Paul Rowley (first round)
- (England) David Pallett (second round)
- (Scotland) John Henderson (first round)
- (England) Arron Monk (third round)
- (England) Alan Tabern (first round)
- (Scotland) Jim Walker (first round)
- (England) Nigel Heydon (second round)
- (Republic of Ireland) Keith Rooney (first round)
- (England) Ross Smith (first round)
- (England) Stuart Kellett (runner-up)
- (England) Michael Smith (first round)
- (Canada) John Part (winner)
- (England) Dave Honey (first round)
- (England) Kevin McDine (first round)
- (Northern Ireland) Daryl Gurney (first round)
- (England) Ian Moss (first round)
- (England) Steve West (first round)
- (England) Darren Webster (first round)
- (England) Tony West (second round)
- (England) Reece Robinson (first round)
- (England) Andy Pearce (first round)
- (England) Brian Woods (first round)

European Qualifier

- (Belgium) Kurt van de Rijck (second round)
- (Austria) Mensur Suljović (third round)
- (Austria) Michael Rasztovits (first round)
- (Finland) Jarkko Komula (first round)
- (Germany) Tomas Seyler (first round)
- (Germany) Bernd Roith (second round)
- (Germany) Jyhan Artut (first round)
- (Netherlands) Jelle Klaasen (first round)

== Draw ==
First round (best of 11 legs); 8 March
1	(England) Dave Chisnall 92.20	6
(England) Darren Webster 87.57	5
32	(England) James Hubbard	4
(England) Nigel Heydon	6
16	(England) Colin Lloyd 93.55	6
(England) Brian Woods 84.38	3
17	(Scotland) Peter Wright 91.29	0
(England) Stuart Kellett 91.09	6
8	(England) Ian White 90.80	4
(England) Arron Monk 91.30	6
25	(England) Mark Walsh 76.88	6
(England) Paul Rowley 74.29	2
9	(Scotland) Robert Thornton 106.09	6
(Scotland) John Henderson 88.61	0
24	(Netherlands) Vincent van der Voort 86.82	2
(England) Tony West 94.95	6
5	(England) Phil Taylor 99.63	6
(England) Andy Pearce 85.86	1
28	(England) Jamie Caven 88.40	6
(Scotland) Jim Walker 82.91	5
12	(England) Terry Jenkins 87.58	6
(England) Kevin McDine 78.28	1
21	(Wales) Richie Burnett 93.94	6
(Austria) Michael Rasztovits 80.58	0
4	(Netherlands) Raymond van Barneveld 89.97	6
(Germany) Tomas Seyler 83.15	1
29	(England) Kevin Painter 86.56	6
(England) Steve West 85.26	5
13	(England) Andy Hamilton 94.93	6
(Northern Ireland) Daryl Gurney 85.31	0
20	(Northern Ireland) Brendan Dolan 96.84	6
(England) Reece Robinson 78.62	1
2	(Australia) Simon Whitlock 89.50	6
(Finland) Jarkko Komula 76.11	3
31	(England) Wayne Jones 85.13	6
(Germany) Jyhan Artut 88.06	3
15	(England) Ronnie Baxter 89.81	6
(England) Alan Tabern 84.06	4
18	(England) Andy Smith 88.88	6
(Republic of Ireland) Keith Rooney 84.62	1
7	(England) Justin Pipe 86.14	2
(Germany) Bernd Roith 93.24	6
26	(England) Colin Osborne 93.74	3
(Austria) Mensur Suljović 97.55	6
10	(Belgium) Kim Huybrechts 76.99	4
(Canada) John Part 86.36	6
23	(Scotland) Gary Anderson 93.80	6
(England) Ian Moss 84.06	1
6	(England) Wes Newton 96.89	6
(England) Ross Smith 93.10	4
27	(Wales) Mark Webster 101.44	6
Simon Craven 87.08	2
11	(England) Adrian Lewis 89.44	6
(England) Dave Honey 84.40	5
22	(Australia) Paul Nicholson 93.59	3
(England) David Pallett 93.59	6
3	(Netherlands) Michael van Gerwen 103.69	6
(Netherlands) Jelle Klaasen 101.24	5
30	(England) Steve Beaton 86.44	4
(Belgium) Kurt van de Rijck 82.47	6
14	(England) James Wade 92.77	6
(England) Adam Hunt 88.43	4
19	(England) Mervyn King 96.11	6
(England) Michael Smith 97.14	5

Second round (best of 11 legs); 9 March
1	(England) Chisnall 93.59	6
(England) Heydon 95.47	5
16	(England) Lloyd 88.68	1
(England) Kellett 94.42	6
(England) Monk 96.85	6
25	(England) Walsh 91.08	4
9	(Scotland) Thornton 100.41	6
(England) T. West 95.06	4
5	(England) Taylor 106.97	6
28	(England) Caven 96.00	1
12	(England) Jenkins 87.58	2
21	(Wales) Burnett 96.75	6
4	(Netherlands) van Barneveld 107.45	6
29	(England) Painter 91.28	2
13	(England) Hamilton 87.22	6
20	(Northern Ireland) Dolan 88.04	4
2	(Australia) Whitlock 89.29	6
31	(England) Jones 84.65	0
15	(England) Baxter 112.90	6
18	(England) A. Smith 99.03	3
(Germany) Roith 88.70	5
(Austria) Suljović 94.80	6
(Canada) Part 93.99	6
23	(Scotland) Anderson 95.80	3
6	(England) Newton 81.08	3
27	(Wales) M. Webster 84.99	6
11	(England) Lewis 97.71	6
(England) Pallett 84.74	3
3	(Netherlands) van Gerwen 102.09	6
(Belgium) van de Rijck 87.65	1
14	(England) Wade 91.76	6
19	(England) King 77.37	1

Third round (best of 11 legs); 10 March
1	(England) Chisnall 93.47	5
(England) Kellett 99.75	6
(England) Monk 89.27	5
9	Thornton 92.76	6
5	(England) Taylor 100.31	6
21	(Wales) Burnett 94.88	5
4	van Barneveld 97.38	3
13	(England) Hamilton 97.36	6
2	(Australia) Whitlock 100.81	6
15	(England) Baxter 94.32	2
(Austria) Suljović 81.93	5
(Canada) Part 88.02	6
27	(Wales) M. Webster 83.14	1
11	(England) Lewis 95.64	6
3	(Netherlands) van Gerwen 102.94	4
14	(England) Wade 98.72	6

Quarter-finals (best of 11 legs); 10 March
Kellett 93.70	6
9	Thornton 88.80	1
5	(England) Taylor 105.70	3
13	Hamilton 103.23	6
2	(Australia) Whitlock 93.59	4
(Canada) Part 96.54	6
11	(England) Lewis 98.74	6
14	(England) Wade 98.28	2

Semi-finals (best of 11 legs); 10 March
Kellett 93.47	6
13	Hamilton 93.70	3
(Canada) Part 96.43	6
11	(England) Lewis 86.36	2

Final (best of 11 legs); 10 March
Kellett 88.77	4
(Canada) Part 94.04	6
