= 2005 World Grand Prix (darts) =

2005 Sky Bet World Grand Prix

Tournament information
- Dates: 24–30 October 2005
- Venue: Citywest Hotel
- Location: Dublin, Ireland
- Organisation(s): Professional Darts Corporation (PDC)
- Format: Sets "double in, double out"
- Prize fund: £100,000
- Winner's share: £20,000
- High checkout: 170 Dave Askew

Champion(s)
- Phil Taylor (ENG)

The 2005 Sky Bet World Grand Prix was the eighth staging of the World Grand Prix darts tournament, organised by the Professional Darts Corporation. It was held at the Citywest Hotel in Dublin, Ireland, from 24 to 30 October 2005.

Phil Taylor won his sixth Grand Prix title, defeating defending champion Colin Lloyd in the final by a score of 7 sets to 1.

== Prize money ==
Position (num. of players)		Prize money (Total: £100,000)
Winner	(1)	£20,000
Runner-Up	(1)	£10,000
Semi-finalists	(2)	£6,000
Quarter-finalists	(4)	£4,000
Second round losers	(8)	£2,250
First round losers	(16)	£1,500

== Seeds ==
There were eight seeds for the tournament.

1. (England) Colin Lloyd
2. (England) Phil Taylor
3. (England) Ronnie Baxter
4. (Netherlands) Roland Scholten
5. (England) Wayne Mardle
6. (England) Peter Manley
7. (England) Kevin Painter
8. (Canada) John Part

== Draw ==
Players in bold denote match winners.

**First round** (best of 3 sets); 24–25 October
1	(England) **Colin Lloyd** 77.91	**2**
(Republic of Ireland) Tom Kirby 76.70	1
(England) **Wes Newton** 79.39	**2**
(England) Steve Hine 73.17	1
8	(Canada) John Part 72.85	0
(England) **Steve Beaton** 79.23	**2**
(England) Kevin J Harris 70.93	0
(England) **Gary Welding** 76.93	**2**
5	(England) **Wayne Mardle** 84.52	**2**
(England) Lionel Sams 74.45	0
(England) **Alex Roy** 81.19	**2**
(England) Alan Warriner 73.75	0
4	(Netherlands) Roland Scholten 82.66	0
(England) **Dennis Priestley** 80.92	**2**
(England) James Wade 71.96	1
(Republic of Ireland) **Keith Rooney** 72.34	**2**
2	(England) **Phil Taylor** 81.29	**2**
(Republic of Ireland) Joe Collins 85.93	0
(England) Bob Anderson 71.83	1
(England) **Andy Jenkins** 83.14	**2**
7	(England) **Kevin Painter** 82.72	**2**
(England) Terry Jenkins 79.19	0
(England) Dave Askew 81.29	0
(England) **Mark Dudbridge** 85.93	**2**
6	(England) **Peter Manley** 83.27	**2**
(England) Denis Ovens 78.98	1
(England) Alan Caves 70.27	1
(Northern Ireland) **John Magowan** 77.93	**2**
3	(England) **Ronnie Baxter** 86.38	**2**
(Scotland) Jamie Harvey 80.71	0
(England) **Dennis Smith** 79.71	**2**
(England) Mark Walsh 80.04	1

**Second round** (best of 5 sets); 26–27 October
1	(England) **Colin Lloyd** 82.80	**3**
(England) Wes Newton 81.48	0
(England) **Steve Beaton** 71.49	**3**
(England) Gary Welding 71.58	1
5	(England) **Wayne Mardle** 78.12	**3**
(England) Alex Roy 72.87	1
(England) **Dennis Priestley** 77.28	**3**
(Republic of Ireland) Keith Rooney 73.32	2
2	(England) **Phil Taylor** 89.82	**3**
(England) Andy Jenkins 79.11	0
7	(England) Kevin Painter 82.92	2
(England) **Mark Dudbridge** 85.74	**3**
6	(England) Peter Manley 78.66	1
(Northern Ireland) **John Magowan** 78.45	**3**
3	(England) Ronnie Baxter 85.14	2
(England) **Dennis Smith** 80.46	**3**

**Quarter-finals** (best of 7 sets); 28 October
1	(England) **Colin Lloyd** 81.15	**4**
(England) Steve Beaton 76.92	3
5	(England) Wayne Mardle 78.27	1
(England) **Dennis Priestley** 83.61	**4**
2	(England) **Phil Taylor** 98.07	**4**
(England) Mark Dudbridge 82.77	0
(Northern Ireland) John Magowan 69.90	0
(England) **Dennis Smith** 75.63	**4**

**Semi-finals** (best of 11 sets); 29 October
1	(England) **Colin Lloyd** 83.22	**6**
(England) Dennis Priestley 82.65	4
2	(England) **Phil Taylor** 94.92	**6**
(England) Dennis Smith 73.44	0

**Final** (best of 13 sets); 30 October
1	(England) Colin Lloyd 82.05	1
2	(England) **Phil Taylor** 90.75	**7**
