= 2012 European Championship (darts) =

2012 PartyPoker.net European Championship

Tournament information
- Dates: 20–23 September 2012
- Venue: RWE-Sporthalle
- Location: Mülheim
- Country: Germany
- Organisation(s): PDC
- Format: Legs
- Prize fund: £200,000
- Winner's share: £50,000
- High checkout: 167 (England) Dave Chisnall (Australia) Simon Whitlock

Champion(s)
- (Australia) Simon Whitlock

The 2012 PartyPoker.net European Championship was the fifth edition of the Professional Darts Corporation tournament, the European Championship, which allows the top European players to compete against the highest ranked players from the PDC Order of Merit. The tournament took place from 20 to 23 September 2012 at the RWE-Sporthalle in Mülheim, Germany.

Phil Taylor was once again defending the title, after winning each of the four previous playings of this tournament since the inaugural edition in 2008. However, he lost for the first time in the quarter-finals 6–10 to Brendan Dolan.

Simon Whitlock won his first major title, defeating Wes Newton 11–5 in the final.

== Prize money ==
The 2012 European Championship has a total prize fund of £200,000. The following is the breakdown of the fund:

Position (no. of players)		Prize money (Total: £200,000)
Winner	(1)	£50,000
Runner-Up	(1)	£20,000
Semi-finalists	(2)	£10,000
Quarter-finalists	(4)	£7,500
Last 16 (second round)	(8)	£5,000
Last 32 (first round)	(16)	£2,500

== Qualification ==
The top 16 players from the PDC Order of Merit after the two Players Championship events in Barnsley automatically qualified for the event. The top 8 from them were also the seeded players. The remaining 16 places went to the top 8 non-qualified players from the PDC Pro Tour Order of Merit, with further places awarded to the top 8 non-qualified players from the Continental Europe Order of Merit.

These are the participants:

- Fourth placed Gary Anderson was banned from the event due to breaching the PDC's rules at the 2012 German Darts Championship.

PDC Top 16
1. (England) Phil Taylor (quarter-finals)
2. (England) Adrian Lewis (first round)
3. (England) James Wade (first round)
4. (England) Wes Newton (runner-up)
5. (England) Andy Hamilton (quarter-finals)
6. (Australia) Simon Whitlock (champion)
7. (England) Terry Jenkins (first round)
8. (Wales) Mark Webster (first round)
9. (Netherlands) Raymond van Barneveld (quarter-finals)
10. (England) Justin Pipe (first round)
11. (England) Kevin Painter (second round)
12. (England) Dave Chisnall (second round)
13. (England) Ronnie Baxter (second round)
14. (England) Mark Walsh (first round)
15. (Australia) Paul Nicholson (first round)
16. (Netherlands) Vincent van der Voort (first round)

Players Championship qualifiers
1. (England) Ian White (second round)
2. (Belgium) Kim Huybrechts (semi-finals)
3. (Netherlands) Michael van Gerwen (second round)
4. (England) Colin Lloyd (quarter-finals)
5. (Wales) Richie Burnett (second round)
6. (Northern Ireland) Brendan Dolan (semi-finals)
7. (England) Andy Smith (first round)
8. (England) Mervyn King (first round)

European qualifiers
1. (Sweden) Magnus Caris (first round)
2. (Netherlands) Co Stompé (first round)
3. (Netherlands) Gino Vos (first round)
4. (Netherlands) Jerry Hendriks (second round)
5. (Austria) Mensur Suljović (first round)
6. (Germany) Andree Welge (second round)
7. (Germany) Michael Rosenauer (first round)
8. (Germany) Tomas Seyler (first round)

== Draw and results ==
The draw was held on 9 September 2012.

First round (best of 11 legs); 20–21 September
1	(England) Phil Taylor 91.66	6
(Sweden) Magnus Caris 90.00	3
(Netherlands) Jerry Hendriks 84.42	6
(Austria) Mensur Suljović 81.09	2
8	(Wales) Mark Webster 91.35	4
(Germany) Andree Welge 92.28	6
(England) Justin Pipe 96.48	3
(Northern Ireland) Brendan Dolan 90.47	6
5	(England) Andy Hamilton 93.94	6
(Australia) Paul Nicholson 83.08	0
(England) Ronnie Baxter 90.34	6
(Germany) Michael Rosenauer 80.51	1
4	(England) Wes Newton 106.09	6
(Germany) Tomas Seyler 88.19	0
(England) Mervyn King 96.49	4
(England) Kevin Painter 96.64	6
2	(England) Adrian Lewis 90.67	0
(England) Ian White 99.10	6
(Belgium) Kim Huybrechts 92.05	6
(Netherlands) Vincent van der Voort 89.96	4
7	(England) Terry Jenkins 92.13	1
(Netherlands) Raymond van Barneveld 113.04	6
(Netherlands) Michael van Gerwen 100.51	6
(England) Andy Smith 95.98	5
6	(Australia) Simon Whitlock 96.71	6
(England) Mark Walsh 84.55	2
(England) Dave Chisnall 81.94	6
(Netherlands) Gino Vos 77.75	3
3	(England) James Wade 93.44	3
(England) Colin Lloyd 97.59	6
(Wales) Richie Burnett 93.40	6
(Netherlands) Co Stompé 90.13	3

Second round (best of 19 legs); 22 September
1	(England) Phil Taylor 98.38	10
(Netherlands) Jerry Hendriks 93.68	7
(Germany) Andree Welge 86.10	5
(Northern Ireland) Brendan Dolan 88.36	10
5	(England) Andy Hamilton 88.98	10
(England) Ronnie Baxter 89.52	8
4	(England) Wes Newton 94.69	10
(England) Kevin Painter 88.23	5
(England) Ian White 93.55	5
(Belgium) Kim Huybrechts 97.00	10
(Netherlands) Raymond van Barneveld 102.25	10
(Netherlands) Michael van Gerwen 103.86	9
6	(Australia) Simon Whitlock 97.49	10
(England) Dave Chisnall 93.39	5
(England) Colin Lloyd 90.21	10
(Wales) Richie Burnett 93.37	8

Quarter-finals (best of 19 legs); 23 September
1	(England) Phil Taylor 89.88	6
(Northern Ireland) Brendan Dolan 89.90	10
5	(England) Andy Hamilton 90.33	7
4	(England) Wes Newton 92.03	10
(Belgium) Kim Huybrechts 92.50	10
(Netherlands) Raymond van Barneveld 94.81	8
6	(Australia) Simon Whitlock 93.01	10
(England) Colin Lloyd 89.68	7

Semi-finals (best of 21 legs); 23 September
(Northern Ireland) Brendan Dolan 88.88	9
4	(England) Wes Newton 91.61	11
(Belgium) Kim Huybrechts 93.47	9
6	(Australia) Simon Whitlock 98.81	11

Final (best of 21 legs); 23 September
4	(England) Wes Newton 89.47	5
6	(Australia) Simon Whitlock 94.91	11

== Statistics ==
Player	Played	Legs Won	Legs Lost	LWAT	100+	140+	180s	High checkout	3-dart average
(Australia) Simon Whitlock	5	48	28	15	99	52	19	167	96.19
(England) Wes Newton	5	42	32	14	88	45	28	129	94.78
(Belgium) Kim Huybrechts	4	35	28	12	74	37	20	164	93.76
(Northern Ireland) Brendan Dolan	4	35	25	11	93	37	10	106	89.40
(Netherlands) Raymond van Barneveld	3	24	20	10	57	38	11	156	103.37
(England) Phil Taylor	3	22	20	6	49	18	6	164	93.31
(England) Colin Lloyd	3	23	21	12	51	41	8	164	92.49
(England) Andy Hamilton	3	23	18	8	52	20	8	160	91.08
(Netherlands) Michael van Gerwen	2	15	15	5	37	22	10	128	102.19
(England) Ian White	2	11	10	5	25	16	5	104	96.33
(Wales) Richie Burnett	2	14	13	7	32	22	8	130	93.39
(England) Kevin Painter	2	11	14	4	38	15	4	134	92.44
(England) Ronnie Baxter	2	14	11	5	30	21	6	138	89.93
(Germany) Andree Welge	2	11	14	3	34	18	0	130	89.19
(Netherlands) Jerry Hendriks	2	13	12	4	31	17	5	142	89.05
(England) Dave Chisnall	2	11	13	4	36	11	6	167	87.67
(England) Andy Smith	1	5	6	1	10	12	3	98	95.68
(England) Mervyn King	1	4	6	1	9	9	2	84	96.49
(Wales) Mark Webster	1	4	6	1	12	5	3	84	91.35
(Netherlands) Vincent van der Voort	1	4	6	1	11	8	1	80	89.96
(England) Justin Pipe	1	3	6	1	11	12	1	130	96.48
(England) James Wade	1	3	6	3	7	8	3	120	93.44
(Netherlands) Co Stompé	1	3	6	1	12	8	0	88	90.13
(Sweden) Magnus Caris	1	3	6	1	13	9	0	38	90.00
(Netherlands) Gino Vos	1	3	6	1	11	6	1	56	77.75
(England) Mark Walsh	1	2	6	0	10	4	1	80	84.55
(Austria) Mensur Suljović	1	2	6	1	8	6	0	46	81.09
(England) Terry Jenkins	1	1	6	0	10	6	1	26	92.13
(Germany) Michael Rosenauer	1	1	6	0	4	2	3	59	80.51
(England) Adrian Lewis	1	0	6	0	5	8	3	–	90.67
(Germany) Tomas Seyler	1	0	6	0	8	6	0	–	88.19
(Australia) Paul Nicholson	1	0	6	0	8	3	0	–	83.03

Source: Match reports from the results

== Broadcasts ==
The tournament was broadcast in the UK on ESPN.
