= Keith Rooney =

Irish professional darts player

Personal information
- Full name: Keith Rooney
- Nickname: Titanium
- Born: 13 February 1981 (age 45) Duleek, County Meath, Ireland
- Home town: Duleek, County Meath, Ireland

Sport
- Sport: Darts
- Playing since: 1998
- Darts: 23g Winmau
- Laterality: Right-handed

Organisation (see split in darts)
- PDC: 2001–2019, 2023 Q school

WDF major events – best performances
- World Masters: Last 48: 2017

PDC premier events – best performances
- World Grand Prix: Last 16: 2005
- UK Open: Last 128: 2003

Other tournament wins
- Years
Ireland Players Championship	2010
Northern Ireland Open	2016

Keith Rooney (born 13 February 1981) is an Irish professional darts player who has played in Professional Darts Corporation events.

Known as Titanium, Rooney qualified for the 2005 World Grand Prix, where he defeated James Wade in the first round, before losing to Dennis Priestley in the second round.

He qualified for the 2013 UK Masters on the PDC European Tour, but lost his first round match to Andy Smith of England.

He would win an Ireland Players Championship event in 2010, as well as the Northern Ireland Open in 2016.

He Runner-up an Ireland Darts Masters in 2019 he lost to Lewy Williams for Wales 3–6 (legs).
