= Richie Burnett =

Welsh darts player (born 1967)

Personal information
- Full name: Richard Burnett
- Nickname: "The Prince of Wales"
- Born: 7 February 1967 (age 59) Cwmparc, Treorchy, Wales

Sport
- Sport: Darts
- Playing since: 1983
- Darts: 23g Red Dragon Signature
- Laterality: Right-handed
- Walk-on music: "Dakota" by Stereophonics

Organisation (see split in darts)
- BDO: 1994–1999
- PDC: 1999–present (Tour Card: 2011–2014, 2017–2018, 2022–2023)

WDF major events – best performances
- World Championship: Winner (1): 1995
- World Masters: Winner (1): 1994
- Dutch Open: Winner (1): 1994

PDC premier events – best performances
- World Championship: Quarter-final: 2002, 2003
- World Matchplay: Runner-up: 2001
- World Grand Prix: Semi-final: 2011
- UK Open: Quarter-final: 2023
- European Championship: Last 16: 2012
- Championship League: Semi-final: 2013
- Desert Classic: Quarter-final: 2004
- US Open/WSoD: Last 64: 2010
- PC Finals: Last 32: 2011, 2011, 2012, 2013

WSDT major events – best performances
- World Championship: Quarter-final: 2025
- Champions: Semi-final: 2025

Other tournament wins
- Years
| BDO Gold Cup | 2001 |
| British Pentathlon | 1995 |
| Denmark Open | 1994 |
| Estonia Open | 2005 |
| Great Mountain Workingmens Club Open | 2010 |
| Las Vegas Open | 2014 |
| PDC Challenge Tour | 2016 (x2), 2024 |
| Welsh Open | 1994, 1995 |
| Witch City Open | 2001 |
Players Championships
| 2011 |

Richard Burnett (born 7 February 1967), nicknamed Prince of Wales, is a Welsh professional darts player who competes in Professional Darts Corporation (PDC) and previously competed in British Darts Organisation (BDO) events. He was formerly ranked BDO world number one. Burnett won the BDO World Championship in 1995 and the World Masters in 1994.

He is known for his fiery personality, fighting with Adrian Lewis on stage during the 2012 Players Championship Finals.

== BDO career ==
Burnett was born in Cwmparc, Treorchy, Rhondda Cynon Taff, and first came to prominence shortly after the split in the game, after the PDC and the BDO players went their separate ways. Burnett began to win many titles in the BDO in 1994, which included the Dutch Open, Welsh Open, British Matchplay and the Denmark Open. He then added one of the two BDO major titles, the Winmau World Masters beating Steve Beaton in the final.

Although the 1995 BDO World Darts Championship was his debut, he had risen in the rankings to become number two seed. After defeating Peter Wright, Russell Stewart, Paul Hogan and Andy Fordham, he went on to win the title, beating Raymond van Barneveld 6–3 (sets) in the final.

Burnett would also reach the final of the BDO World Championship on two more occasions, losing in 1996 to Steve Beaton, and in 1998 to Raymond van Barneveld. His 1996 final defeat was his first match loss at Lakeside and ended a run of nine consecutive match wins. The 1998 final went into the 11th and deciding set, and into a tiebreak. Burnett had had an out-shot for the title, but narrowly missed his second dart at treble-14 which would have left him on double 20, and did not get another opportunity to win the match.

In the two years after winning the 1994 Winmau World Masters title, Burnett suffered upset losses in the Winmau World Masters finals of 1995 and 1996, losing to Erik Clarys and Colin Monk respectively.

After a first-round defeat in the 1999 BDO World Championship to Ronnie Baxter, Burnett switched to compete on the PDC circuit. However, Burnett continued playing at the Winmau World Masters until 2001, reaching the semi-finals in 2001, where he lost to his old rival, Raymond van Barneveld.

== PDC career ==
=== 1997–2006 ===
Burnett had first competed in the PDC in April 1997, at the Antwerp Open. In June 1997, Burnett played in a challenge match against the PDC World Champion, Phil Taylor, which was the main event at the Battle of the Champions card at the Circus Tavern, broadcast on Sky Sports. Although Burnett was in good form, Taylor was in top form and won the match 4-1 in sets. A few weeks later, Burnett reached the semi-finals of the 1997 World Matchplay, losing to Alan Warriner.

Burnett played in the World Matchplay again in 1999, losing in the first round to eventual finalist, Peter Manley, and again in 2000, when he reached the semi-finals for the first time since 1997, this time losing to eventual champion, Phil Taylor. Burnett's best televised performance to date in the PDC was in reaching the final of the 2001 World Matchplay, where he again lost to Taylor.

At the PDC World Championships, Burnett was never able to achieve the same kind of results that he had in the BDO or at the PDC World Matchplay. His best results at the PDC World Championship were to twice reach the quarter-finals (2002 and 2003), but his world ranking steadily fell afterwards, and by the end of 2005 he had almost slipped out of the top 50. As a result, he had to qualify for all the major PDC tournaments and failed to qualify for the World Championships for the first time in 2006.

=== 2006–2010 ===
This led to many years of poor form and falling world rankings, with his only television appearances between 2005 and 2010 coming at the UK Open, apart from his run in the qualifying rounds for the 2007 PDC World Darts Championship when he won four matches to make it to the television stages. However, he lost in the first round to Alex Roy. He was also reported to be suffering from dartitis at this time, which was visible at the 2008 UK Open, where he lost in the first round to Jamie Harvey.

Burnett stopped playing darts for a few months in 2009, and it was reported in September that year that he had financial difficulties and was on the dole.

=== 2010–2014 ===
He showed an improvement in his form in October 2010, by reaching the semi-finals of the John McEvoy Gold Dart Classic, losing in a last-leg decider to Gary Anderson. A week later, he reached two successive PDC Pro Tour finals in Bad Nauheim, Germany – losing 4–6 to fellow Welshman Mark Webster on Saturday, and then by the same scoreline to Simon Whitlock on Sunday. His improved form earned him qualification for the 2011 World Championships and the 2011 Players Championship Finals (February). The improvement continued throughout 2011 reaching the semi-finals of the World Grand Prix, where he lost to Phil Taylor, which was Burnett's best result at a television event for 10 years. Burnett also claimed his first-ever PDC Pro Tour title in September, beating Dave Chisnall in the final.

Burnett secured the first shock of the 2012 World Championships by defeating fellow countryman and number six seed, Mark Webster, 3–2 in the first round. He lost nine out of the first ten legs in his second round match to John Part and, although he did win a set, was beaten 1–4. He then teamed up with Webster for the World Cup and together they reached the semi-finals with wins over Croatia and South Africa. They could not reach the final however, as the English pair of Phil Taylor and Adrian Lewis won 1–3. In March he hit a nine-dart finish in the fourth UK Open Qualifier during a first round match against Michael Barnard. Burnett was later knocked out in the fourth round of the event by Dennis Priestley. He then made it to the quarter-finals of the Austrian Darts Open where he lost 3–6 to Raymond van Barneveld. Burnett lost 4–9 in the last 32 of the UK Open to Peter Wright. In the first round of the European Darts Open Burnett produced a stunning 121 average during a 6–2 win over Andy Jenkins, and went on to reach the semi-finals where he lost 4–6 to Raymond van Barneveld. At the World Matchplay, Burnett suffered a 5–10 defeat to James Wade in the first round. After all 33 ProTour events of 2012 had been played, Burnett was 22nd on the Order of Merit, comfortably inside the top 32 who qualified for the Players Championship Finals. He was defeated by Adrian Lewis 3–6 in the first round.

In the first round of the 2013 World Championship, Burnett came through a deciding set against James Hubbard and a partisan crowd to set up a clash with Andy Hamilton. Burnett won the first set, but then missed five darts to go 2–0 up and went on to lose 1–4. He played in his second World Cup of Darts with Mark Webster and they reached the semi-finals where they faced the number one seeds of Phil Taylor and Adrian Lewis. Webster lost to Taylor, but Burnett defeated Lewis 4–3 meaning a doubles match was needed to settle the tie. Burnett missed one dart at double ten to complete a 140 finish for the match and Wales would lose 4–3. Burnett beat Webster 9–2 in the third round of the UK Open, but then lost 9–6 to Steve West in the subsequent round. At the German Darts Championship Burnett came through final leg deciders against James Richardson and Robert Thornton and then averaged almost 102 in beating Steve Brown 6–2. His best run of the year continued with a 6–4 quarter-final success over Jamie Caven before missing one match dart in the semis against Peter Wright to lose 6–5. Burnett topped Group 7 of the Championship League and then beat Kim Huybrechts 6–3 in the semi-finals and survived five match darts in the final against Gary Anderson to win 6–5. In the Winners Group he won four of his seven games to finish third in the table and advance to the play-offs where he was defeated 6–2 by Michael van Gerwen.

Burnett beat Dean Winstanley 3–1 in the opening round of the 2014 World Championship and then saw off Andy Hamilton 4–1 to advance to the third round for the first time since 2005. He led Ian White 3–1 but could only win two of the next eleven legs to lose 4–3. Burnett and Webster advanced to the quarter-finals of the World Cup of Darts, where their match against the Australian pairing of Simon Whitlock and Paul Nicholson went into a deciding doubles match which Wales lost 4–0. Burnett was involved in two one-sided contests at the World Matchplay as he defeated Brendan Dolan 10–4 in the first round and then lost 13–2 to James Wade in the second. In September he reached his first final on the PDC tour in almost three years at the 13th Players Championship, beating world number one Michael van Gerwen along the way, and led Gary Anderson 3–1 and 5–3, but would lose 6–5. He missed 11 starting doubles in the deciding leg of his first round match against Simon Whitlock at the World Grand Prix, but still managed to win the match with a 121 finish. Burnett stated afterwards that he felt the only thing keeping from being a top eight ranked player was consistency. His run continued with a 3–1 win over Terry Jenkins, before losing by a reverse of this scoreline to Stephen Bunting in the quarter-finals.

=== Positive drugs test ===
Burnett was due to play at the 2015 World Championship as the 26th seed, but was removed from the field the day before the first round draw was made for personal reasons. In January 2015, it was announced that Burnett did not renew his PDC Tour Card for the 2015 season. In October 2015, it was confirmed by UK Anti-Doping that Burnett had tested positive for cocaine at the Grand Slam of Darts Qualifier in November 2014. He was banned for 18 months.

=== Comeback ===
Burnett returned to competitive darts in May 2016 and he won two Challenge Tour tournaments. He tried to get his Tour Card status back at Q School in January 2017 and succeeded on the third day by beating Paul Nicholson 5–3 in the final round. His best result on the 2017 Pro Tour was when he reached the last 32, which he achieved twice. He failed to qualify for any of the European tour events and also failing to qualify for the 2018 World Championship. Burnett would lose his Tour Card after failing to qualify for the 2019 World Championship and was unable to get it back at Q-School.

Burnett competed in the 2020 PDC Challenge Tour, where he made it to a final in Challenge Tour 6, but lost to David Evans in a deciding leg 5–4.

In August 2021, Burnett was given an invitation to compete in the inaugural World Seniors Darts Championship come February 2022. But he had to later turn it down after winning a PDC Tour Card at PDC Q-School in January.

In November 2022, Burnett successfully qualified for the 2023 PDC World Championship, via the PDC Tour Card Holder Qualifiers. He lost a very close round 1 game to Czech player Adam Gawlas 3–2.

In March 2023, Burnett reached the quarter-finals stage of the 2023 UK Open, a first appearance at this stage of a ranked televised tournament since 2014. He most notably defeated world ranked number two Peter Wright in the sixth round before falling to a 10–2 defeat to Dimitri van den Bergh.

Burnett would again enter the PDC Tour Card Holder Qualifiers for the 2024 PDC World Championship. He was eliminated in the round of 16 to Alan Soutar 6–4. Burnett would end the 2023 season in 76th place on the PDC Order of Merit and lost his Tour Card again after the 2 years.

=== Later career ===
After an unsuccessful run at Q-School, Burnett would enter the 2024 World Seniors Darts Championship as an invited player in February. He started with a 3–1 victory over 1983 BDO World Champion Keith Deller but lost by the same score line in the second round to the eventual runner-up Colin McGarry.

Burnett also competed on the 2024 PDC Challenge Tour. He started off strongly by winning the very first Challenge Tour in January, beating Darryl Pilgrim in a deciding leg 5–4. Burnett later made the semi-finals in Challenge Tour 13, but lost to the eventual winner Connor Scutt 5–4. Burentt also made it to the quarterfinals in Challenge Tour 23, where he lost to Alexander Merkx 5–3. Burnett ended in 20th place on the Challenge Tour order of merit.

Burnett's results in the Challenge Tour allowed him to get regular call-ups to Players Championship events to fill-in for a number of absence players who had a Tour Card. His best result was reaching the last 16 at Players Championship 10, where he lost to Krzysztof Ratajski 6–2.

Burnett would return for the 2025 World Seniors Darts Championship in February, via the qualifiers. He started off with a close 3–2 victory over Kevin Painter in the first round, before going on to beat Richie Howson in the second round 3–1. Burnett lost to Steve Beaton in a whitewash quarterfinal game 3–0. Burnett would later enter the 2025 World Seniors Champion of Champions tournament in June. He recorded wins over Simon Whitlock and John Henderson before losing to defending champion Richie Howson in the semi-finals 6–4. Burnett was meant to face Neil Duff in the first round of the 2025 World Seniors Matchplay in November. Unfortunately, the WSD had to cancel the tournament in August, following the unexpected demise of the organisation.

Burnett again competed on the PDC Challenge Tour but failed to make an impact throughout.

In January 2026, Burnett joined the 2026 Challenge Tour.

== World Championship results ==
=== BDO ===
- 1995: Winner (beat Raymond van Barneveld 6–3) (sets)
- 1996: Runner-up (lost to Steve Beaton 3–6)
- 1997: Second round (lost to Leo Laurens 0–3)
- 1998: Runner-up (lost to Raymond van Barneveld 5–6)
- 1999: First round (lost to Ronnie Baxter 0–3)

=== PDC ===
- 2001: Second round (lost to Keith Deller 2–3)
- 2002: Quarter-finals (lost to Colin Lloyd 4–6)
- 2003: Quarter-finals (lost to Kevin Painter 2–5)
- 2004: Third round (lost to Simon Whatley 3–4)
- 2005: Third round (lost to Mark Dudbridge 3–4)
- 2007: First round (lost to Alex Roy 0–3)
- 2011: First round (lost to Alan Tabern 2–3)
- 2012: Second round (lost to John Part 1–4)
- 2013: Second round (lost to Andy Hamilton 1–4)
- 2014: Third round (lost to Ian White 3–4)
- 2023: First round (lost to Adam Gawlas 2–3)

=== WSDT ===
- 2024: Second round (lost to Colin McGarry 1–3)
- 2025: Quarter-finals (lost to Steve Beaton 0–3)

== Career finals ==
=== BDO major finals: 7 (3 titles) ===
Legend
World Championship (1–2)
World Masters (1–2)
British Matchplay (1–0)

| Outcome | No. | Year | Championship | Opponent in the final | Score (Note: (l) = score in legs, (s) = score in sets.) |
|---|---|---|---|---|---|
| Winner | 1. | 1994 | British Matchplay | (England) Ronnie Baxter | 5–4 (s) |
| Winner | 2. | 1994 | World Masters | (England) Steve Beaton | 3–2 (s) |
| Winner | 3. | 1995 | World Championship | (Netherlands) Raymond van Barneveld | 6–3 (s) |
| Runner-up | 1. | 1995 | World Masters | (Belgium) Erik Clarys | 0–3 (s) |
| Runner-up | 2. | 1996 | World Championship | (England) Steve Beaton | 3–6 (s) |
| Runner-up | 3. | 1996 | World Masters | (England) Colin Monk | 2–3 (s) |
| Runner-up | 4. | 1998 | World Championship | (Netherlands) Raymond van Barneveld | 5–6 (s) |

=== PDC major finals: 1 ===
| Outcome | No. | Year | Championship | Opponent in the final | Score |
|---|---|---|---|---|---|
| Runner-up | 1. | 2001 | World Matchplay | (England) Phil Taylor | 10–18 (l) |

== Performance timeline ==
BDO

| Tournament | 1985 | 1991 | 1993 | 1994 | 1995 | 1996 | 1997 | 1998 | 1999 | 2000 | 2001 | 2007 |
|---|---|---|---|---|---|---|---|---|---|---|---|---|
| BDO World Championship | DNQ | | | | W | F | 2R | F | 1R | PDC | | |
| World Masters | 3R | RR | 2R | W | F | F | 1R | 2R | 1R | 3R | SF | PDC |
| European Masters | Not held | | | | SF | Not held | | | | | | |
| International Darts League | Not held | | | | | | | | | | | RR |

PDC

| Tournament | 1997 | 1998 | 1999 | 2000 | 2001 | 2002 | 2003 | 2004 | 2005 | 2006 | 2007 | 2008 | 2009 | 2010 | 2011 | | 2012 | 2013 | 2014 | 2018 | 2021 | 2022 | 2023 |
|---|---|---|---|---|---|---|---|---|---|---|---|---|---|---|---|---|---|---|---|---|---|---|---|
PDC Ranked televised events
| World Championship | DNP | | | | 2R | QF | QF | 3R | 3R | DNQ | 1R | DNQ | | | 1R | | 2R | 2R | 3R | DNQ | | | 1R |
| UK Open | Not held | | | | | | 4R | 1R | 4R | 3R | 6R | 1R | 1R | 1R | 5R | | 4R | 4R | 3R | 1R | 1R | 2R | QF |
| World Matchplay | SF | DNP | 1R | SF | F | 1R | 2R | 1R | DNQ | | | | | | | | 1R | DNQ | 2R | Did not qualify | | | |
| World Grand Prix | NH | DNP | | 2R | 2R | 1R | 1R | 1R | DNQ | | | | | | SF | | 1R | 1R | QF | Did not qualify | | | |
| European Championship | Not held | | | | | | | | | | | DNQ | | | | | 2R | Did not qualify | | | | | |
| Players Championship Finals | Not held | | | | | | | | | | | | DNQ | | 1R | 1R | 1R | 1R | Did not qualify | | | | |
PDC Non-ranked televised events
| World Cup | Not held | | | | | | | | | | | | | DNP | NH | | SF | SF | QF | Did not participate | | | |
PDC Past major events
| Las Vegas Desert Classic | Not held | | | | | 1R | RR | QF | DNQ | | | | | Not held | | | | | | | | | |
| Championship League | Not held | | | | | | | | | | | DNQ | | | | | RR | SF | Not held | | | | |
| Year-end ranking | - | - | - | - | - | - | - | - | - | - | - | - | 146 | 62 | 37 | | 25 | 28 | 26 | 94 | - | 101 | 76 |

WSD

| Tournament | 2024 | 2025 |
|---|---|---|
WSD Televised events
| World Seniors Darts Championship | 2R | QF |
| World Seniors Champion of Champions | DNP | SF |

PDC European Tour

| Season | 1 | 2 | 3 | 4 | 5 | 6 | 7 | 8 | 9 | 10 | 11 | 12 | 13 |
|---|---|---|---|---|---|---|---|---|---|---|---|---|---|
| 2012 | ADO; QF | GDC; 1R | EDO; SF | GDM; 2R | DDM; DNQ | | | | | | | | |
| 2013 | UKM; 3R | EDT; 1R | EDO; 2R | ADO; 1R | GDT; 2R | GDC; SF | GDM; 2R | DDM; 1R | | | | | |
| 2014 | GDC; 1R | DDM; 3R | DNQ | | GDT; 1R | DNQ | | EDT; 1R | | | | | |
| 2018 | DNQ | | | ADO; 2R | DNP | | GDT; 1R | Did not participate/qualify | | | | | |
| 2023 | DNQ | | IDO; 1R | Did not qualify | | | | | | | | | |

PDC Players Championships

| Season | 1 | 2 | 3 | 4 | 5 | 6 | 7 | 8 | 9 | 10 | 11 | 12 | 13 | 14 | 15 | 16 | 17 | 18 | 19 | 20 | 21 | 22 | 23 | 24 | 25 | 26 | 27 | 28 | 29 | 30 | 31 | 32 | 33 | 34 |
|---|---|---|---|---|---|---|---|---|---|---|---|---|---|---|---|---|---|---|---|---|---|---|---|---|---|---|---|---|---|---|---|---|---|---|
| 2017 | BAR; 2R | BAR; 1R | BAR; 3R | BAR; 2R | MIL; 2R | MIL; 3R | BAR; 1R | BAR; 1R | WIG; 1R | WIG; 1R | MIL; 3R | MIL; 2R | WIG; 1R | WIG; 2R | BAR; 1R | BAR; 2R | BAR; 2R | BAR; 1R | DUB; 1R | DUB; 1R | BAR; 2R | BAR; 2R | | | | | | | | | | | | |
| 2018 | Did not participate | | | | | | | | | | | | | | | | BAR; 1R | BAR; 1R | DUB; 1R | DUB; 1R | BAR; 2R | BAR; 1R | | | | | | | | | | | | |
| 2020 | Did not participate | | | | | | | | | | | | | | | | | | COV; 1R | COV; 1R | COV; 1R | COV; 2R | COV; 1R | | | | | | | | | | | |
| 2022 | BAR; 3R | BAR; 2R | WIG; 1R | WIG; 1R | BAR; 1R | BAR; 1R | NIE; 1R | NIE; 1R | BAR; 1R | BAR; 2R | BAR; 2R | BAR; 1R | BAR; 2R | WIG; 3R | WIG; 1R | NIE; 2R | NIE; 1R | BAR; 2R | BAR; 1R | BAR; 1R | BAR; 2R | BAR; 1R | BAR; 2R | BAR; 3R | BAR; 1R | BAR; 1R | BAR; 4R | BAR; 2R | BAR; 3R | BAR; 2R | | | | |
| 2023 | BAR; 1R | BAR; 3R | BAR; 1R | BAR; 1R | BAR; 1R | BAR; 1R | HIL; 2R | HIL; 1R | WIG; 1R | WIG; 1R | LEI; 2R | LEI; 1R | HIL; 2R | HIL; 2R | LEI; 2R | LEI; 1R | HIL; 3R | HIL; 3R | BAR; 1R | BAR; 3R | BAR; 1R | BAR; 1R | BAR; 1R | BAR; 1R | BAR; 1R | BAR; 1R | BAR; 1R | BAR; 2R | BAR; 2R | BAR; 1R | | | | |
| 2024 | WIG; DNP | WIG; 1R | LEI; DNP | LEI; 1R | HIL; 1R | HIL; 1R | LEI; DNP | | HIL; 1R | HIL; 4R | HIL; 2R | HIL; 1R | MIL; 2R | MIL; 2R | MIL; 1R | MIL; 1R | MIL; 1R | MIL; 1R | MIL; 1R | WIG; DNP | | LEI; 1R | LEI; 1R | WIG; 1R | WIG; 1R | WIG; 1R | WIG; 2R | WIG; 1R | LEI; 1R | LEI; 2R | | | | |

Key

Performance Table Legend
| W | Won the tournament | F | Finalist | SF | Semifinalist | QF | Quarterfinalist | #R; RR; Prel. | Lost in # round Round-robin; Preliminary round | DQ | Disqualified |
| DNQ | Did not qualify | DNP | Did not participate | WD | Withdrew | NH | Tournament not held | #R; RR; Prel. | Lost in # round Round-robin; Preliminary round | NYF | Not yet founded |
