= Jerry Hendriks =

Dutch darts player

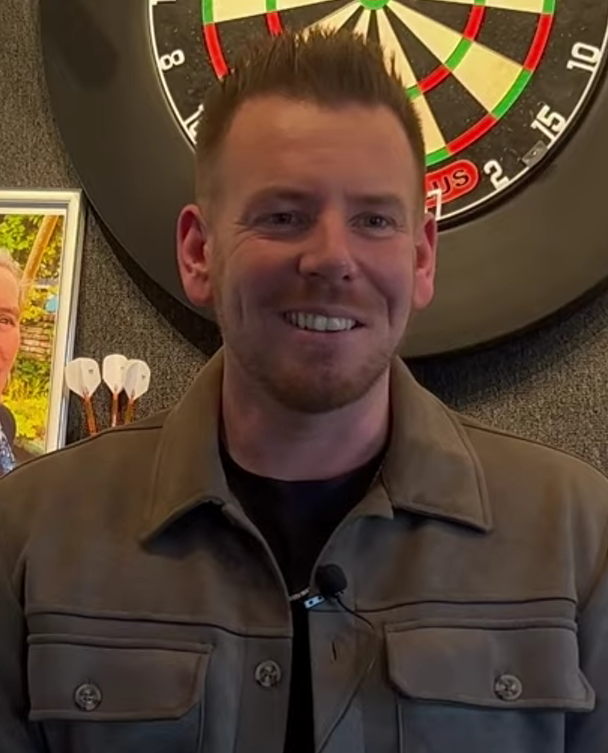
- Hendriks in 2026

Personal information
- Nickname: "Electric"
- Born: 25 October 1988 (age 37) Eindhoven, Netherlands
- Home town: Venlo, Netherlands

Sport
- Sport: Darts
- Playing since: 2003
- Laterality: Right-handed
- Walk-on music: "Freed from Desire" by Gala

Organisation (see split in darts)
- BDO: 2003–2012
- PDC: 2012–

WDF major events – best performances
- World Masters: Last 16: 2010
- Dutch Open: Last 16: 2024

PDC premier events – best performances
- World Championship: Last 32: 2013
- UK Open: Last 128: 2012
- European Championship: Last 16: 2012

Other tournament wins
- Years
WDF World Youth Cup	2003

Jerry Hendriks (born 25 October 1988) is a Dutch darts player who plays in Professional Darts Corporation (PDC) events.

== Career ==
=== BDO ===
Hendriks won the 2003 WDF World Youth Cup. During his time in the BDO he was a losing semi-finalist in the French Open and Swiss Open and was defeated in the last 16 of the 2010 World Masters.

=== PDC ===
In 2012, he qualified for the European Championship through the European Order of Merit, and beat Mensur Suljović 6–2 in the first round. He played fifteen-time world champion Phil Taylor in the second round and in an even contest, Hendriks was edged out 7–10, stating afterwards that his goal for the remainder of the season was to qualify for the World Championship for the first time. He achieved this by finishing eighth on the European Order of Merit, taking the fourth and final spot that was available for non-qualified players. Hendriks beat Wayne Jones 3–0 in the first round, winning each of his sets by three legs to two and clinched the match with a 156 checkout. He faced Taylor again in the second round and won the first set, but went on to lose 1–4. Hendriks was ranked world number 58 after the event, inside the top 64 who guarantee their entry into all the PDC Pro Tour events for 2013.

He had a poor run of form in the 2013 UK Open qualifiers as he played in all eight but only won two matches to not even feature in the UK Open Order of Merit as he failed to earn any money. Hendriks qualified for three European Tour events during the year but lost in the first round on each occasion. He held on to his place on the tour by being ranked 57th after the conclusion of the 2014 World Championship.

Hendriks qualified for the 2014 German Darts Masters and lost 6–4 to Magnus Caris in the first round. The £1,000 he earned was the only money he won during the whole year and, as he lost the £10,000 from the 2013 World Championship in the rankings, he fell 86 places during the year to world number 143. Hendriks was unable to earn a tour card through Q School, but he still had entry into European Tour and UK Open qualifiers in 2015. His standout result during the year was a 6–3 win over Wes Newton in the first round of the Dutch Darts Masters, before losing 6–3 to Terry Jenkins in the subsequent round. A poor 2016 saw his best performances being a last 64 exit in a UK Open Qualifier and a last 32 exit in a Challenge Tour event. He also played in the BDO's German Open, but was knocked out in the last 32.

Hendriks claimed a spot in the 2017 World Championship by seeing off Jan Dekker 6–4 in the final of the Central European Qualifier and defeated Warren Parry 2–0 in the preliminary round. In the first round he could only win two legs against Peter Wright, one of which came via a 156 checkout, as he lost 3–0. He attempted to win a tour card at Q School, but failed to progress past the last 64 during the four days of play.

== World Championship results ==
=== PDC ===
- 2013: Second round (lost to Phil Taylor 1–4)
- 2017: First round (lost to Peter Wright 0–3)
