= Terry Temple =

English darts player

Personal information
- Full name: Terence Temple
- Nickname: The Terminator
- Born: 16 August 1961 (age 65) Conisbrough, Yorkshire, England
- Home town: Whitwell-on-the-Hill, Yorkshire, England

Sport
- Sport: Darts
- Playing since: 2000
- Darts: 21 Gram Harrows
- Laterality: Right-handed

Organisation (see split in darts)
- BDO: 2006–2010
- PDC: 2010–2020
- WDF: 2022–

WDF major events – best performances
- World Masters: Last 64: 2006

PDC premier events – best performances
- UK Open: Last 16: 2013

Other tournament wins
- Years
North Ormesby Open	2014

Terence Temple (born 16 August 1961) is an English professional darts player currently playing in World Darts Federation (WDF) events. He has come through Qualifying School to earn a place on the PDC three times and is exempt to play events until the end of the 2017 season.

== Career ==
Temple made his television debut at the 2012 UK Open at the Reebok Stadium in Bolton. He lost out 6–9 to Simon Whitlock in the last 64, earning himself £1,000 in the process.

Temple's best result of 2012 came in the UK Open Qualifier 4 at the Barnsley Metrodome, defeating the likes of reigning world champion Adrian Lewis before losing 2–6 to Dean Winstanley in the quarter-finals. He qualified for the fourth European Tour event of 2012, the German Darts Masters and beat three time world champion John Part 6–2 in the first round, before losing to Tony West 4–6 in the last 32. Temple also qualified for the next event, the Dutch Darts Masters, but Co Stompé defeated him 2–6 in the first round. Temple came within one match of qualifying for his first World Championship when he reached the semi-finals of the qualifying event. He had won five matches to get to this stage and knew that a win over Stuart Kellet would guarantee him a place in the preliminary round at least. However, he was beaten 1–5.

Temple was ranked world number 71 after the World Championship, outside of the top 64 who retain their tour cards for the 2013 season. He therefore entered Q School in a bid to win a two-year card and was one match away from doing so on the final day, but lost to Royden Lam 6–3. Temple therefore did not have automatic entry into PDC Pro Tour events for 2013. He qualified for the UK Open by finishing 50th on the UK Open Order of Merit. He enjoyed wins over Prakash Jiwa, Mark Lawrence and John Bowles to reach the last 16 for the first time in his career. He faced Andy Hamilton and comprehensively lost 1–9. His deepest run in the rest of the year came two weeks later at the fifth Players Championship where he was defeated 6–2 by Kevin Painter in the quarter-finals. Temple once again competed in Q School in an attempt to earn a new PDC tour card. He got closest to doing so on the first day when he lost 5–3 to Brian Woods in the last 16. However, after all four days were completed Temple was ranked 19th on the Q School Order of Merit, inside the top 24 who earn their places for the 2014 and 2015 seasons.

In February 2014, Temple won the North Ormesby Open by beating Dave Prins in the final. He failed to qualify for the UK Open, but had a good season in the Players Championship events by reaching the last 16 two times and the quarter-finals of the 11th tournament where he was whitewashed 6–0 by Gary Anderson.

Temple entered the 2015 UK Open at the second round stage and missed three matches darts against Kyle Anderson to be defeated 5–4. His sole European Tour appearance came at the European Darts Matchplay where he lost 6–3 against Tony Newell. After making last 32 and last 16 appearances during the four days of 2016 Q School, Temple finished sixth on the Order of Merit to earn a two-year tour card. However, during 2016 he was unable to get beyond the last 64 of any event.
