= Andy Jenkins =

English darts player (born 1971)

Personal information
- Nickname: "Rocky"
- Born: 11 March 1971 (age 55) Portsmouth, Hampshire, England
- Home town: Cosham, Hampshire, England

Sport
- Sport: Darts
- Playing since: 1980s
- Darts: 21g Red Dragon
- Laterality: Right-handed
- Walk-on music: "Gonna Fly Now" by Bill Conti

Organisation (see split in darts)
- BDO: 1994–2002
- PDC: 2002–2025 (Tour Card: 2011–2017)

WDF major events – best performances
- World Championship: Last 16: 1996
- World Masters: Quarter-finals: 1999, 2000
- World Trophy: Last 40: 2007
- Int. Darts League: Group stage: 2007
- Finder Masters: Last 16 Group: 2001

PDC premier events – best performances
- World Championship: Semi-finals: 2007
- World Matchplay: Quarter-finals: 2001, 2004
- World Grand Prix: Semi-finals: 2002
- UK Open: Semi-finals: 2004
- Grand Slam: Last 16: 2008
- European Championship: Last 32: 2008
- Championship League: Initial groups, 8th, 2008
- Desert Classic: Last 16: 2002, 2004, 2005, 2006
- US Open/WSoD: Last 16: 2006
- PC Finals: Last 32: 2009

WSDT major events – best performances
- World Championship: Last 16: 2023

Other tournament wins
- Years
Bob Anderson Classic	2003
Cosham Xmas Open	2002, 2011
England Open	2000
Japan Open	2001
Mill Rythe Darts Festival	1992, 1998, 2002
PDC Challenge Tour	2019, 2022
Portsmouth Grand Prix	2015
Swiss Open	2001
Target Open Series 7	2023
Vauxhall Autumn Open	2000
UK Open Regionals
Southern England	2002

Andrew Jenkins (born 11 March 1971) is an English former professional darts player who competed in Professional Darts Corporation (PDC) events. He was nicknamed "Rocky" due to his rough personality. Jenkins has reached high rankings in the PDC, but has never won a major tournament. In 2009, Jenkins was given a PDC ban for almost two years for an assault on Terry Jenkins during a non-televised PDC tournament. In 2025, Jenkins was banned from DRA regulated events for eleven years after being found guilty of match-fixing.

== Career ==
=== BDO ===
Jenkins began his career playing in British Darts Organisation competitions and had some success in the open events. He took the British Gold Cup Singles in 1994, England Open in 2000, Swiss Open and Japan Open in 2001 and the Isle of Man Open in 2002.

He made his debut at the Lakeside BDO World Darts Championship in 1995, and managed only one win in his seven consecutive appearances. His only victory came in 1996 against Bruno Raes, and suffered defeats to Sean Palfrey (1995), Andy Fordham (1996, 1998), Ronnie Baxter (1997), Graham Hunt (1999), Colin Monk (2000) and Kevin Painter (2001).

Despite his poor record at Lakeside, Jenkins made it to the semi-finals of the revived News of the World Darts Championship in 1997, and the quarter-finals of the World Masters in 1999 and 2000.

=== PDC ===
He decided to switch to the Professional Darts Corporation in 2002 he also continued to lose in the first round of the PDC World Darts Championship – he lost to Denis Ovens at the 2002 edition. He rose steadily up the PDC World Rankings after PDC and was seeded 10th for the 2003 World Championship. Again he went out in the first round to Chris Mason.

When the World Championship field expanded in 2004, the top players joined in at the third round stage – where Jenkins again lost his first match (to Bob Anderson). At the 2005 World Championship, Jenkins finally notched up a victory over Peter Evison,. Jenkins went out to Painter in the last 16. A second round defeat came in the 2006 World Championship – Jenkins was seeded eight (his highest ever ranking) who defeat Patrick Bulen and but went down to Wayne Jones.

He went into the 2007 World Championship as the number 12 seed. He beat Adrian Lewis in the last 16 on his way to the semi-finals where Raymond van Barneveld woj 6–0. In the 2008 World Championship, Jenkins got through a tough first-round game against Czech qualifier Miloslav Navratil but was then beaten 4–0 by Alan Tabern in the second round.

Jenkins has had more success away from the World Championships. He reached the semi-finals of the World Grand Prix in 2002 and the semi-finals of the UK Open in 2004 – losing to John Part on both occasions.

Jenkins received a suspension from the tour following misconduct at the PDC's German Open event. He returned to the circuit on 15 May, with another nine months suspended in case of future misdemeanours. His suspension however cost him a place in the 2008 World Matchplay as he didn't win enough money to qualify.

He beat Phil Taylor at the 2008 Grand Slam of Darts but went out in the last 16 to Simon Whitlock.

Jenkins suffered a first round exit in the 2009 PDC World Championship, losing to Co Stompé. His inability to defend semi-final prize money from the 2007 Championship, meant that Jenkins dropped out of the top 32 on the PDC Order of Merit.

In November 2009, the Darts Regulation Authority gave Jenkins a 24-month ban (20 months suspended) for an assault on Terry Jenkins that took place at the Nuland Players Championship in the Netherlands in October.

He lost in the first round of the 2010 World Championship to Peter Manley. He was due to participate in the 2010 Players Championship Finals, but due to his ban, his place in the draw was taken by Manley. After four months out, Jenkins returned the PDC circuit, but failed to qualify for any major events that year. His failure to qualify for the 2011 World Championship was his first absence from either World Championship since 1994. Jenkins qualified for the 2013 World Championship via the Pro Tour Order of Merit and lost to Justin Pipe 3–0 in sets in the first round, winning only two legs during the match. He lost 9–3 to Stephen Bunting in the third round of the UK Open. In November, Jenkins reached his first ranking final for five years at the 14th Players Championship of the year. Whilst the top 16 in the Order of Merit were competing in the Masters, Jenkins was winning six games before losing 6–3 to Ian White in the final. Jenkins came agonisingly close to reaching the 2014 World Championship as he finished just £200 behind the final qualifier on the ProTour Order of Merit. He therefore played in the qualifier and won four games to advance to the semi-finals where a fifth win would guarantee him at least a place in the preliminary round, but he was beaten 5–3 by Matt Clark.

Jenkins could not qualify for the 2014 UK Open as he failed to progress past the last 128 in any of the six qualifiers. His best result of the year was in the reaching the last 16 of the 13th Players Championship where he lost 6–5 to Mervyn King.

Jenkins' ranking of world number 69 at the beginning of 2015 meant he needed to enter Q School as he was outside the top 64 who remain on tour and he qualified for a two-year tour card on the second day by beating Chris Dobey 5–3. He was eliminated of the UK Open 9–6 by Josh Payne in the third round. Successive wins over Dave Chisnall and Ronnie Baxter saw Jenkins play in his only quarter-final this year at the 12th Players Championship where he lost 6–2 to Peter Wright.

Jenkins had 6–5 and 9–5 wins over Wayne Jones and Richie Corner at the 2016 UK Open, before losing 9–2 to Vincent van der Voort in the fourth round. He had his best run of the year at the eighth Players Championship by knocking out Kevin Painter, Steve Brown, Michael Smith and Justin Pipe to play in the quarter-finals, where he was whitewashed 6–0 by Jamie Caven. Jenkins beat Steve West 6–3 and watched Alan Norris miss match darts to win 6–5 at the European Darts Trophy. He lost 6–3 to James Wade in the third round. As well as his quarter-final, a last 16 finish and a number of last 32 finishes saw Jenkins earn a place in the Players Championship Finals, where he lost 6–3 to Justin Pipe in the first round.

Jenkins qualified for the 2019 UK Open on 9 February 2019 following success at the Riley's qualifier in South Benfleet.

In November 2023, Jenkins was one of three players suspended by the Darts Regulation Authority over suspicious betting patterns on matches in the Modus Super Series. In April 2025, he received an eleven year ban from DRA events and a £17,850 fine for match-fixing.

== World Championship results ==
=== BDO ===
- 1995: First round (lost to Sean Palfrey 1–3)
- 1996: Second round (lost to Andy Fordham 2–3)
- 1997: First round (lost to Ronnie Baxter 0–3)
- 1998: First round (lost to Andy Fordham 1–3)
- 1999: First round (lost to Graham Hunt 1–3)
- 2000: First round (lost to Colin Monk 2–3)
- 2001: First round (lost to Kevin Painter 0–3)

=== PDC ===
- 2002: First round (lost to Denis Ovens 3–4)
- 2003: Second round (lost to Chris Mason 2–4)
- 2004: Third round (lost to Bob Anderson 1–4)
- 2005: Fourth round (lost to Kevin Painter 3–4)
- 2006: Second round (lost to Wayne Jones 3–4)
- 2007: Semi-finals (lost to Raymond van Barneveld 0–6)
- 2008: Second round (lost to Alan Tabern 0–4)
- 2009: First round (lost to Co Stompé 1–3)
- 2010: First round (lost to Peter Manley 2–3)
- 2013: First round (lost to Justin Pipe 0–3)

=== WSDT ===
- 2023: Second round (lost to Richie Howson 1–3)

== Career statistics ==
Performance Table Legend
W	Won the tournament	F	Finalist	SF	Semifinalist	QF	Quarterfinalist	#R; RR; Prel.	Lost in # round Round-robin; Preliminary round	DQ	Disqualified
DNQ	Did not qualify	DNP	Did not participate	WD	Withdrew	NH	Tournament not held	#R; RR; Prel.	Lost in # round Round-robin; Preliminary round	NYF	Not yet founded

=== Performance timeline ===
BDO

Tournament	1994	1995	1996	1997	1998	1999	2000	2001
BDO World Championship	DNQ	1R	2R	1R	1R	1R	1R	1R
World Masters	4R	2R	4R	1R	3R	QF	QF	1R
Zuiderduin Masters	Not held						DNP	RR
News of the World Darts Championship	NH			SF	Not held			

PDC

Tournament	1997	1998	1999	2000	2001	2002	2003	2004	2005	2006	2007	2008	2009	2010	2011	2012	2013	2014	2015	2016	2017	2018	2019	2020
PDC World Championship	BDO					1R	2R	3R	4R	2R	SF	2R	1R	1R	DNQ		1R	Did not qualify						
UK Open	Not held						4R	SF	4R	4R	4R	3R	4R	DNQ	2R	1R	3R	DNQ	3R	4R	2R	1R	2R	1R
World Matchplay	1R	1R	DNQ	1R	QF	1R	2R	QF	2R	2R	2R	DNQ	1R	Did not qualify										
World Grand Prix	NH	DNP		1R	1R	SF	2R	2R	2R	1R	2R	Did not qualify												
European Championship	Not held											1R	Did not qualify											
Grand Slam of Darts	Not held										RR	2R	Did not qualify											
Players Championship Finals	Not held												1R	Did not qualify						1R	Did not qualify			
Las Vegas Desert Classic	Not held					1R	DNQ	2R	2R	2R	DNQ			Not held										
