= Paul Williams (darts player) =

English darts player (born 1964)

Personal information
- Nickname: "Mr. Smiler"
- Born: 16 November 1964 (age 61) Bolton, Lancashire, England
- Home town: Bolton, Lancashire, England

Sport
- Sport: Darts
- Playing since: 1984
- Darts: 24g
- Laterality: Right-handed
- Walk-on music: "We Will Rock You" by Queen

Organisation (see split in darts)
- BDO: 1990–2001
- PDC: 2001–2012

WDF major events – best performances
- World Championship: Quarter-Finals: 1995, 1997
- World Masters: Semi-Finals: 1993

PDC premier events – best performances
- World Championship: Last 16: 2005
- World Matchplay: Last 32: 2002, 2003, 2004, 2005
- World Grand Prix: Last 16: 2003
- UK Open: Semi-Finals: 2003
- Desert Classic: Last 24: 2003

Other tournament wins
- Years
Finnish Open	1999
Torremolinos Open	1992, 1993, 1994

Paul Williams (born 16 November 1964) is an English professional darts player.

== Career ==
Williams played in six BDO World Championships between 1995 and 2000, reaching the quarter-finals on two occasions, and played in four PDC World Championships between 2002 and 2005, reaching the last 16 in 2005.

== World Championship performances ==
=== BDO ===
- 1995: Quarter-Finals: (lost to Andy Fordham 2–4) (sets)
- 1996: Last 32: (lost to John Part 2–3)
- 1997: Quarter-Finals: (lost to Les Wallace 0–4)
- 1998: Last 32: (lost to Steve Beaton 1–3)
- 1999: Last 16: (lost to Andy Fordham 0–3)
- 2000: Last 32: (lost to Kevin Painter 1–3)

=== PDC ===
- 2002: Last 32: (lost to Phil Taylor 1–4)
- 2003: Last 40: (lost to Simon Whitlock 2–4)
- 2004: Last 32: (lost to Kevin Painter 3–4)
- 2005: Last 16: (lost to Wayne Mardle 3–4)
