= Sean Palfrey =

Welsh darts player

Personal information
- Nickname: Silver
- Born: 24 July 1968 (age 58) Newport, Wales
- Home town: Tonypandy, Rhondda, Wales

Sport
- Sport: Darts
- Playing since: 1986
- Darts: 19g Red Dragon
- Laterality: Left-handed
- Walk-on music: "Uptown Girl" by Westlife

Organisation (see split in darts)
- BDO: 1988–2002
- PDC: 2002–2009

WDF major events – best performances
- World Championship: Quarter Finals: 1998
- World Masters: Last 16: 1988, 1993, 1996, 2000

PDC premier events – best performances
- UK Open: Last 32: 2004

Other tournament wins
- Tournament: Years
- BDO Gold Cup British Teenage Open Malta Open Norway Open WDF Europe Cup Pairs WDF World Cup Pairs WDF World Cup Team: 1997; 1988; 1999; 1998; 1998; 1997; 1997

Sean Palfrey (born 24 July 1968) is a Welsh former professional darts player who played in Professional Darts Corporation (PDC) events.

== Career ==
Palfrey was a regular in the British Darts Organisation (BDO) World Professional Darts Championship, where his best result was reaching the quarter-finals in 1998. He played for the Welsh men's team in the WDF World Cup darts competition in 1997. He made a total of 32 international appearances for Wales.

== World Championship results ==
=== BDO ===
- 1991: 1st round (lost to Bob Anderson 1–3)
- 1994: 1st round (lost to Roland Scholten 0–3)
- 1995: 2nd round (lost to Paul Hogan 0–3)
- 1997: 1st round (lost to Raymond van Barneveld 0–3)
- 1998: Quarter-finals (lost to Roland Scholten 4–5)
- 1999: 1st round (lost to Raymond van Barneveld 0–3)
- 2000: 1st round (lost to Steve Duke 2–3)
