= Gary Welding =

English darts player (born 1963)

Personal information
- Nickname: Capper/The Hitman
- Born: 23 May 1963 (age 63)
- Home town: St Helens, Lancashire, England

Sport
- Sport: Darts
- Darts: 21g Tony O'Shea
- Laterality: Right

Organisation (see split in darts)
- BDO: 1985-2004, 2015-2019
- PDC: 2004-2011

WDF major events – best performances
- World Masters: Last 64 1999

PDC premier events – best performances
- World Championship: Quarter Final 2006
- World Grand Prix: Quarter Final 2004
- UK Open: Last 32 2005, 2009

Other achievements
- England National Singles 1999

Gary Welding (born 23 May 1963) is a former professional English darts player who played in both BDO and PDC events.

== Career ==
A St Helens county player, Welding achieved his first notable success in 1999, winning the English National Singles, a satellite event of the then-British Darts Organisation. That helped him to qualify for that year's World Masters, although he would only reach the last 64, eventually losing to Andy Fordham.

Welding's next notable tournament run would come following a switch to the PDC in 2004, where he had a surprise run to the quarter finals of that year's World Grand Prix, defeating sixth seed Wayne Mardle and Adrian Lewis before losing out to Colin Lloyd.

In 2005, Welding would reach the last 32 of the UK Open (claiming the scalp of Steve Beaton) and the last 16 of that year's Grand Prix, before qualifying for the World Championships, where he would arguably have the most notable run of his career. Drawn against top seed Colin Lloyd, Welding produced a 3-2 victory that was cited as one of the biggest shocks in World Championship history. He would then defeat Erwin Extercatte and John Kuczynski to secure a surprise quarter-final berth, before eventually losing to Wayne Jones.

This would prove to be the peak of his televised results in the PDC, with only one further World Championship appearance in 2007 (losing in the first round to Andy Hamilton) and a handful of UK Open appearances to show for his years on the PDC circuit. He did, however, reach a tour event final in the 2006 Eastbourne Open, losing to Barrie Bates.

Welding would remain with the PDC until the end of 2011, although he never recaptured the form that saw him break through from 2004 to 2006. He would play a handful of BDO events in the years after this, last playing in the professional ranks at the Welsh Classic in 2019.

== Tournament record ==
=== BDO ===
Tournament	1999
World Masters	L64

=== PDC ===
Tournament	2004	2005	2006	2007	2008	2009	2010	2011
UK Open	DNQ	L32	L64	L64	L96	L32	DNQ	L160
World Grand Prix	QF	L16	DNQ					
World Championship	DNQ		QF	L64	DNQ			

== World Championship record ==
=== PDC ===
- 2006: Quarter Final (lost to Wayne Jones 5-0)
- 2007: Last 64 (lost to Andy Hamilton 3-0)

== Personal life ==
Welding was a block paver outside of darts.
