= 2015 in darts =

This article documents all major events in the sport of darts over the course of 2015.

== January ET ==
- January 3–11: 2015 BDO World Darts Championship in (England) Frimley Green
  - Men's winner: (England) Scott Mitchell
  - Women's winner: (England) Lisa Ashton
- January 14: Youth Pacific Masters in Australia
  - Boy's winner: (Australia) Matthew Thompson
  - Girl's winner: (Australia) Tori Kewish
- January 18: 2015 Quebec Open in Sherbrooke
  - Men's winner: (Canada) Dawson Murschell
  - Women's winner: (Canada) Dianne Gobeil
- January 23–25: Fleetwood Memorial – Las Vegas Open in (United States) Las Vegas
  - Men's winner: (Canada) Jeff Smith
  - Women's winner: (United States) Paula Murphy
- January 23–25: Romanian Classic Darts Open in (Romania) Bucharest
  - Men's winner: (England) Jamie Hughes
  - Women's winner: (Czech Republic) Hana Belobradkova
- January 24–25: German Gold Cup in (Germany) Bremen
  - Men's winner: (Germany) Kevin Münch
  - Women's winner: (Germany) Irina Armstrong
- January 30 – February 1: Dutch Open Darts in Netherlands
  - Men's winner: (England) Martin Adams
  - Women's winner: (Netherlands) Aileen de Graaf

== February ET ==
- February 6 – 8: Camellia Classic in United States
  - Men's winner: (United States) Larry Butler
  - Women's winner: (United States) Stacy Pace
- February 27 – March 1: Port City Open in United States
  - Men's winner: (United States) Darin Young
  - Women's winner: (Canada) Robin Curry
- February 28 – March 1: Halifax Open in (Nova Scotia) Halifax
  - Men's singles: (Canada) Kiley Edmunds
  - Men's doubles: (Canada) Delton McDonald / Willie MacIsaac
  - Women's singles: (Canada) Tammy Perry
  - Women's doubles: (Canada) Donna Starrett / Linda Macleod
  - Mixed doubles: (Canada) Darlene MacLeod / Adam Stella

== March ET ==
- March 7–8: Trakai Castle Cup in Lithuania
  - Men's winner: (England) Russell Jenkins
  - Women's winner: (Finland) Lumi Silvan
- March 12–15: Virginia Beach Classic in (United States) Virginia Beach
  - Men's winner: (United States) Darin Young
  - Women's winner: (Canada) Trish Grzesik
- March 14–15: West Coast Classic in Australia
  - Men's winner: (Australia) Justin Miles
  - Women's winner: (Australia) Pam Burr
- March 14–15: Greater Vancouver Open in (British Columbia) Vancouver
  - Men's winner: (Canada) Dawson Murschell
  - Women's winner: (Canada) Ivy Wieshlow
- March 14–15: Winmau Iceland Open in Reykjavík
  - Men's winner: (Netherlands) Barry Zander
  - Women's winner: (Iceland) Elínborg Björnsdóttir
- March 14: Kronenbourg 1664 Gibraltar Open in Gibraltar
  - Men's winner: (England) John Ferrell
  - Women's winner: (Scotland) Susanna Young
- March 20–22: Berwick Youth Easter Darts in (Scotland) Berwick-upon-Tweed
  - Boy's winner: (England) Callan Rydz
  - Girl's winner: (Scotland) Rebecca Graham
- March 21: HAL Masters in Netherlands
  - Men's winner: (Belgium) Roger Janssen
  - Women's winner: (England) Deta Hedman
- March 22: Youth Novgorod Cup in (Russia) Veliky Novgorod
  - Boy's winner: (Russia) Mikhail Kuritcin
  - Girl's winner: (Russia) Inna Ramonova
- March 22: HAL Open Darts in Netherlands
  - Men's winner: (England) Martin Adams
  - Women's winner: (Netherlands) Aileen de Graaf

== April ET ==
- April 3 – 5: Darts Victoria Easter Classic in Australia
  - Men's winner: (Australia) Robbie King
  - Women's winner: (Australia) Corrine Hammond
  - Youth winner: (Australia) Tori Kewish
- April 4: Riga Open in (Latvia) Riga
  - Men's winner: (Lithuania) Darius Labanauskas
  - Women's winner: (Finland) Kaisu Rekinen
  - Youth winner: (Lithuania) Ugnius Jankunas
- April 5: Moscow Open Youth in (Russia) Moscow
  - Boy's winner: (Russia) Mikhail Kuritcin
  - Girl's winner: (Russia) Elena Golyasheva
- April 10 – 12: Mediterranean Open in (Turkey) Antalya
  - Men's winner: (Turkey) Ümit Uygunsözlü
  - Women's winner: (Turkey) Şennur Yaşlı
  - Boy's winner: (Turkey) Mertcan Türkyilmaz
  - Girl's winner: (Russia) Olga Abromova
- April 10 – 12: White Mountain Shootout in United States
  - Men's winner: (United States) Tom Sawyer
- April 11: Silver Cup Challenge in (Alberta) Medicine Hat
  - Boy's winner: (Canada) Dawson Murschell
  - Girl's winner: (Canada) Clover Arndt
- April 18: Bull's German Open in Germany
  - Men's winner: (Netherlands) Wesley Harms
  - Women's winner: (England) Deta Hedman
- April 19: Bull's Darts Masters in Germany
  - Men's winner: (Netherlands) Jeffrey de Graaf
  - Women's winner: (England) Lorraine Winstanley
  - Boy's winner: (England) Callum Rydz
  - Girl's winner: (Denmark) Sofia Jan Bendorff
- April 24 – 26: Estonia Open in Tallinn
  - Men's winner: (Lithuania) Darius Labanauskas
  - Women's winner: (Finland) Maret Liiri
- April 26: North Island Masters Singles in New Zealand
  - Men's winner: (New Zealand) Cody Harris
  - Women's winner: (New Zealand) Tina Osborne

== May ET ==
- May 1 – 3: Cleveland Extravaganza in United States
  - Men's winner: (United States) Marlise Kiel
  - Women's winner: (Canada) Trish Grzesik
- May 2: Zakamsk Youth Cup in (Russia) Perm
  - Boy's winner: (Russia) Sergei Goncharov
  - Girl's winner: (Russia) Anastasia Kliucek
- May 2: Denmark Open in Denmark
  - Men's winner: (England) Glen Durrant
  - Women's winner: (Netherlands) Aileen de Graaf
  - Boy's winner: (Denmark) Andreas Bergø
  - Girl's winner: (Netherlands) Kyana Frauenfelder
- May 3: Udmurtia Youth Cup in (Russia) Izhevsk
  - Boy's winner: (Russia) Mikhail Kuirtcin
  - Girl's winner: (Russia) Anastasia Suvorova
- May 3: Denmark Masters in Denmark
  - Men's winner: (Netherlands) Jeffrey de Graaf
  - Women's winner: (England) Fallon Sherrock
  - Boy's winner: (Netherlands) Maikel Verberk
  - Girl's winner: (Denmark) Sofie Jahn Bendorff
- May 8 – 10: Hungarian Open in (Hungary) Győr
  - Men's winner: (England) Aaron Hardy
  - Women's winner: (Hungary) Veronika Ihász
  - Boy's winner: (Hungary) György Vörösházi
  - Girl's winner: (Hungary) Vivien Czipó
- May 9: Target Finnish Open in Finland
  - Men's winner: (Sweden) Daniel Larsson
  - Women's winner: (Finland) Lumi Silvan
- May 10: Target Finnish Masters in Finland
  - Men's winner: (England) James Hurrell
  - Women's winner: (Finland) Kaisu Rekinen
- May 13 – 16: Mediterranean Cup (Invitation) in (Italy) Jesolo
  - Overall winner: Greece
- May 15 – 17: DFW Metroplex Open in United States (postponed)
- May 15 – 17: Uganda International Darts Open in Kampala
- May 16: Bull's Trophy Gelsenkirchen in Germany
  - Men's winner: (Netherlands) Ryan de Vreede
  - Women's winner: (Netherlands) Aileen de Graaf
- May 16 – 17: Lithuania Open in Lithuania
  - Men's winner: (Lithuania) Darius Labanauskas
  - Women's winner: (England) Amanda Abbot
- May 17: Bull's Classics Gelsenkirchen in Germany
  - Men's winner: (Netherlands) Fabian Roosenbrand
  - Women's winner: (Germany) Irina Armstrong
- May 17: Italy Med Cup Open in Jesolo
  - Men's winner: (Italy) Mer Cabril Allarce
  - Women's winner: (Turkey) Şennur Yaşlı
- May 23: Winmau Polish Open in Poland
  - Girl's winner: (Denmark) Sofie Bendorff
  - Boy's winner: (Netherlands) Javanico Jansen
  - Men's winner: (Lithuania) Darius Labanauskas
  - Women's winner: (England) Deta Hedman
- May 23 – 24: Sunshine State Classic in (Australia) Brisbane
  - Men's winner: (Australia) Nathan Paice
  - Women's winner: (Australia) Corrine Hammond
  - Boy's winner: (Australia) Braidon Charlton
  - Women's winner: (Australia) Candice Whitley
- May 24: Police Masters in Poland
  - Girl's winner: (Denmark) Sofie Bendorff
  - Boy's winner: (Netherlands) Javanico Jansen
  - Men's winner: (Wales) Martin Phillips
  - Women's winner: (England) Deta Hedman
- May 30: SA Youth Singles in (Australia) Ridleyton
- May 31: Canterbury Open in New Zealand
  - Men's winner: (New Zealand) Craig Caldwell
  - Women's winner: (New Zealand) Carol Williams

== June ET ==
- June 5–7: SDA Swiss Open in (Switzerland) Lausen
  - Men's winner: (England) Dave Prins
  - Women's winner: (Denmark) Ann-Louise Peters
  - Boy's winner: (Netherlands) Maikel Verberk
- June 5–7: BDO International Open in United Kingdom
  - Men's winner: (England) Martin Atkins
  - Women's winner: (England) Deta Hedman
- June 13: Scottish Classic in Scotland
  - Men's winner: (Scotland) Steve Ritchie
  - Women's winner: (England) Deta Hedman
- June 13: PUMA NZ Masters in New Zealand
- June 20: Canadian Open in (Ontario) St. Catharines
  - Men's winner: (Manitoba) Rory Orvis
  - Women's winner: (Ontario) Cindy Hayhurst
- June 27–28: Central Coast Classic in Australia
  - Men's winner: (Australia) Raymond Smith
  - Women's winner: (Australia) Corrine Hammond
- June 27–28: Austrian Open Vienna in (Austria) Vienna
  - Men's winner: (Netherlands) Danny Blom
  - Women's winner: (Hungary) Veronika Ihász
  - Boy's winner: (Austria) Rusty-Jake Rodriguez
  - Girl's winner: (Hungary) Vivien Czipó

== July ET ==
- July 3–5: Australian Grand Masters in (Australia) Canberra
- July 5: Apatin Open in Serbia
  - Men's winner: (Croatia) Boris Krčmar
  - Women's winner: (Hungary) Veronika Ihász
- July 8–11: WDF Europe Cup Youth in (Denmark) Bredsten
  - Netherlands and Ireland share the Boys overall Championship.
  - Hungary take the Girls title.
- July 12: Japan Open in Japan
  - Men's winner: (Japan) Seigo Asada
  - Women's winner: (England) Fallon Sherrock
  - Youth winner: (Japan) Kakeru Saito
- July 26: Pacific Masters in (Australia) Perth
  - Men's winner: (Australia) Peter Machin
  - Women's winner: (Australia) Lorraine Burn
- July 31 – August 2: Winmau Belgium Open in Belgium
  - Men's winner: (Netherlands) Jeffrey de Graaf
  - Women's winner: (England) Fallon Sherrock
  - Men's Youth winner: (Netherlands) Maarten Dirk Woord
  - Women's Youth winner: (Netherlands) Kyana Frauenfelder

== August ET ==
- August 5: PUMA NZ Open in New Zealand
  - Men's winner: (New Zealand) Cody Harris
  - Women's winner: (New Zealand) Tina Osborne
- August 7–9: USA Classic in United States
  - Men's winner: (United States) Larry Butler
  - Men's Winner: (United States) Marlise Kiel
  - Boy's winner: (United States) Dominik Pundt
  - Girl's winner: (United States) Kerena Reese
- August 14–16: Antwerp Open in Belgium
  - Men's winner: (Wales) Jim Williams
  - Women's winner: (England) Deta Hedman
  - Youth winner: (Netherlands) Job ten Heuvel
  - Women's Youth winner: (Netherlands) Kyana Frauenfelder
- August 21–23: Swedish Open in Sweden
  - Men's winner: (England) Jamie Hughes
  - Women's winner: (England) Casey Gallagher
  - Boys Youth winner: (Sweden) Kevin Lundeström
  - Girls Youth winner: (Denmark) Samantha Krop
- August 21: LDO Swedish Classic in Sweden
  - Winner: (England) Casey Gallagher
- August 29–30: International French Open in France
  - Men's winner: (Wales) Dean Reynolds
  - Women's winner: (England) Fallon Sherrock
  - Youth winner: (Netherlands) Levy Frauenfelder

== September ET ==
- September 11–13: Winmau Bulgaria Open in Sofia
  - Men's winner: (Greece) Kostas Pantelidis
  - Women's winner: (Bulgaria) Anelia Eneva
- September 11–13: Baltic Cup Open in Estonia
  - Men's winner: (Scotland) John Imrie
  - Women's winner: (Latvia) Sarmīte Lavrentjeva
- September 12: Catalonia Open in Catalonia
  - Men's winner: (Catalonia) Carles Arola
  - Women's winner: (Netherlands) Sharon Prins
- September 13: FCD Anniversary Open in Catalonia
  - Men's winner: (England) Kevin Simm
  - Women's winner: (Netherlands) Sharon Prins
- September 18: Auckland Open in New Zealand
  - Men's winner: (New Zealand) Craig Caldwell
  - Women's winner: (New Zealand) Sha Hohipa
- September 25–27: Luxembourg Winmau Open in Luxembourg
  - Men's winner: (Switzerland) Thomas Junghans
  - Women's winner: (England) Deta Hedman
  - Youth winner: (Netherlands) Geert Nentjes
- September 26–27: North QLD Classic in (Australia) Townsville
  - Men's winner: (Australia) Raymond Smith
  - Women's winner: (Australia) Natalie Carter

== October ET ==
- October 2–4: Malaysian Open in (Malaysia) Kuala Lumpur
- October 6–11: BDO Winmau World Masters (Invitation) + (World Pro Play-Offs, Invitation) in England
  - Men's winner: (England) Glen Durrant
  - Women's winner: (Netherlands) Aileen de Graaf
  - Boy's winner: (Netherlands) Justin van Tergouw
  - Girl's winner: (England) Danielle Ashton
- October 9: Klondike Open in (Canada) Edmonton
  - Men's winner: (Canada) Ken MacNeil
  - Women's winner: (Canada) Kim Bellay-Rousselle
- October 16–18: Witch City Open in United States
  - Men's winner: (Canada) Jeff Smith
  - Women's winner: (Canada) Robin Curry
- October 17–18: Australian Geelong Masters in Australia
- October 17–18: Hong Kong Open in Hong Kong
- October 21–25: Turkish Open in Turkey
  - Men's winner: (Wales) Jim Williams
  - Women's winner: (England) Deta Hedman
- October 23–25: Colorado Open in United States
  - Men's winner: (United States) Timmy Nicoll
  - Women's winner: (United States) Marlise Kiel
- October 23–25: Bob Jones Memorial in (Canada) Trenton
  - Men's winner: (Canada) David Cameron
  - Women's winner: (Canada) Roxanne Van Tassel
- October 25: Next Talent of Darts in Netherlands
  - (Netherlands) Geert Nentjes, Cassandra Hof and Owen Roelofs
- October 26–31: WDF World Cup (Invitation) in Turkey
  - Men's winner: (Wales) Jim Williams
  - Women's winner: (England) Lisa Ashton
  - Men's Youth winner: (Netherlands) Maikel Verberk
  - Women's Youth winner: (South Africa) Tayla Carolissen
- October 30 – November 1: Ghost On The Coast in United States
  - Men's winner: (United States) Danny Pace
  - Women's winner: (United States) Stacey Pace

== November ET ==
- November 6–8: Northern Ireland Open in Northern Ireland
  - Men's winner: (Northern Ireland) Colin McGarry
  - Women's winner: (England) Deta Hedman
  - Boy's winner: (Northern Ireland) Nathan Rafferty
  - Girl's winner: (Republic of Ireland) Jamie O'Connor
- November 10–12: Malta Open in Buġibba
  - Men's winner: (Turkey) Ümit Uygunsözlü
  - Women's winner: (Germany) Ann-Kathrin Wigmann
- November 13–15: Latvia Open in Riga
  - Men's winner: (Finland) Ulf Ceder
  - Women's winner: (Sweden) Maud Jansson
  - Youth winner: (Latvia) Rihards Slišāns
- November 13–15: Seacoast Open in United States
  - Men's winner: (United States) Larry Butler
  - Women's winner: (Canada) Robin Curry
- November 15: Ted Clements Memorial (Levin Open) in New Zealand
  - Men's winner: (New Zealand) Craig Caldwell
  - Women's winner: (New Zealand) Judy Fenton
- November 20–22: Sunparks Masters in Belgium
  - Men's winner: (Netherlands) Yordi Meeuwisse
  - Women's winner: (Russia) Anastasia Dobromyslova
  - Youth winner: (Netherlands) Justin van Tergouw
  - Women's Youth winner: (Netherlands) Kyana Frauenfelder
- November 20–22: Czech Open in Czech Republic
  - Men's winner: (Netherlands) Jeffrey Sparidaans
  - Women's winner: (Netherlands) Aileen de Graaf
  - Youth winner: (Netherlands) Wessel Nijman
  - Women's Youth winner: (Hungary) Vivien Czipó
- November 21 & 22: Italian Grand Master in Italy
  - Men's winner: (Malta) Norbert Attard
  - Women's winner: (Italy) Giada Ciofi

== December ET ==
- December 5–7: Finder Darts Masters in Netherlands
- December 6: Youth Ural Cup in (Russia) Yekaterinburg
