= 2004 PDC World Darts Championship =

Tournament information
- Dates: 27 December 2003 – 4 January 2004
- Venue: Circus Tavern
- Location: Purfleet
- Country: England
- Organisation(s): PDC
- Format: Sets; Final – best of 13
- Prize fund: £257,000
- Winner's share: £50,000
- High checkout: 170; Peter Manley; Ronnie Baxter

Champion(s)
- Phil Taylor

The 2004 PDC World Darts Championship (known for sponsorship reasons as the 2004 Ladbrokes.com World Darts Championship) was the eleventh PDC version of the World Darts Championship. The tournament took place between 27 December 2003 and 4 January 2004 at the Circus Tavern, Purfleet, England.

An extra round was added, with the top 16 seeds given a bye to the third round, bringing the total players at the televised stages to 48. Ladbrokes, who sponsored the event initially for one year in 2003, decided to extend their deal and the prize fund was increased to £256,000. The Dutch television station, RTL 5 and Sky Sports both extended their deals with the PDC by three years. PDC chairman Barry Hearn announced that the tournament would be shown in Malaysia on pay-per-view.

Defending champion and number two seed, John Part suffered a surprise first-round defeat to Mark Dudbridge, his first match of the 2004 campaign.

The final became only the second ever (and first PDC) world final to go to a sudden-death leg. The first time it happened was when Phil Taylor beat Mike Gregory in the 1992 BDO final, Taylor was again involved and came out victorious against Kevin Painter. He came from 4–1 down to win his 11th world title.

The two losing semi-finalists came from different ends of darts experience. 56-year-old Bob Anderson, a World Champion 16 years earlier lost to Painter and Wayne Mardle was making his first PDC World Championship semi-final appearance. Mardle lost to Taylor for the second year running, following a third-round defeat as an unseeded player in 2003.

== Seeds ==
There were sixteen seeds in the World Championship.

Seeded players
Enter in third round

1. (England) Phil Taylor
2. (Canada) John Part
3. (England) Peter Manley
4. (Netherlands) Roland Scholten
5. (England) Colin Lloyd
6. (England) Dennis Smith
7. (England) Ronnie Baxter
8. (England) Denis Ovens
9. (England) Alan Warriner
10. (England) Kevin Painter
11. (England) Andy Jenkins
12. (England) Wayne Mardle
13. (Wales) Richie Burnett
14. (England) Dave Askew
15. (Scotland) Jamie Harvey
16. (England) Dennis Priestley

Unseeded players
Enter in third round

- (England) John Lowe
- (England) Alex Roy
- (England) Peter Evison
- (England) Keith Deller
- (England) Bob Anderson
- (England) Les Fitton
- (England) Paul Williams
- (England) Steve Beaton

Enter in second round

- (England) Mark Holden
- (United States) Steve Brown
- (England) Cliff Lazarenko
- (England) Mark Walsh
- (England) Lionel Sams
- (England) Mick Manning
- (England) Mark Dudbridge
- (England) Simon Whatley

PDPA Qualifiers
Enter in first round

- (Northern Ireland) Colin McGarry
- (England) Ritchie Buckle
- (England) Steve Maish
- (Belgium) Erik Clarys
- (Scotland) Alex MacKay
- (Wales) Wayne Atwood
- (England) Steve Smith
- (England) Robbie Widdows

International Qualifiers
Enter in first round

- (United States) Tony Payne
- (United States) Dan Lauby
- (Australia) Barry Jouannet
- (Netherlands) Jan van der Rassel
- (Canada) Rory Orvis
- (Japan) Toru Sano
- (Guyana) Norman Madhoo
- (Northern Ireland) Henry O'Neill

=== International qualifying tournaments ===
- Highest Placed North American in the Desert Classic: (United States) Tony Payne bt Ricky Villanueva (United States)
- American Darters Association: (United States) Dan Lauby bt Ray Carver (United States)
- Oceanic Masters: (Australia) Barry Jouannet bt Mick Parker (Australia)
- RTL Television Holland Playoff: (Netherlands) Jan van der Rassel bt Bert Vlaardingerbroek (Netherlands)
- Canada Winner: Rory Orvis bt Seymour Dixon
- Japan Winner: Toru Sano bt Hiroshi Watanobe
- Caribbean Winner: (Guyana) Norman Madhoo bt Anthony Forde (Barbados)
- Ireland Winner: (Northern Ireland) Henry O'Neill bt John MaGowan (Northern Ireland)

== Prize money ==
Position (num. of players)		Prize money (Total: £257,000)
Winner	(1)	£50,000
Runner-Up	(1)	£25,000
Semi-finalists	(2)	£12,500
Quarter-finalists	(4)	£7,500
Fourth round losers	(8)	£5,250
Third round losers	(16)	£3,250
Second round losers	(8)	£2,500
First round losers	(8)	£1,500
Highest finish bonus	(1)	£1,000

== New format ==
To accommodate the change in the number of entries into the competition to 48, the format of the World Championship was again changed. 16 qualifiers would contest the first round, with the eight winners going through to the second round to meet players ranked between 25 and 32 in the PDC. The eight second round winners would go through to join the top 24 in the third round, where the tournament proceeded from the last 32 to the Final.

== Results ==
Players in bold denote match winners.

=== Rounds 1-2 ===
**First round** (best of 5 sets); 27 December
(Canada) Rory Orvis 82.00	0
(Northern Ireland) **Colin McGarry** 88.60	**3**
(England) **Ritchie Buckle** 87.15	**3**
(Netherlands) Jan van der Rassel 83.76	1
(United States) Tony Payne 73.21	0
(England) **Steve Maish** 82.04	**3**
(United States) Dan Lauby 65.59	0
(Belgium) **Erik Clarys** 79.24	**3**
(Australia) Barry Jouannet 75.51	2
(Scotland) **Alex MacKay** 85.15	**3**
(Wales) **Wayne Atwood** 77.34	**3**
(Japan) Toru Sano 66.52	0
(Guyana) Norman Madhoo 74.06	1
(England) **Steve Smith** 80.49	**3**
(England) **Robbie Widdows** 84.64	**3**
(Northern Ireland) Henry O'Neill 82.06	2

**Second round** (best of 5 sets); 28 December
(England) Mark Holden 75.63	0
(Northern Ireland) **Colin McGarry** 86.21	**3**
(United States) Steve Brown 83.42	0
(England) **Ritchie Buckle** 91.71	**3**
(England) Cliff Lazarenko 80.53	2
(England) **Steve Maish** 82.20	**3**
(England) Mark Walsh 72.29	0
(Belgium) **Erik Clarys** 79.21	**3**
(England) **Lionel Sams** 85.83	**3**
(Scotland) Alex MacKay 84.77	2
(England) Mick Manning 80.57	0
(Wales) **Wayne Atwood** 87.94	**3**
(England) **Mark Dudbridge** 81.70	**3**
(England) Steve Smith 78.26	0
(England) **Simon Whatley** 80.34	**3**
(England) Robbie Widdows 81.86	1

=== Round 3 onwards ===
**Third round** (best of 7 sets); 29–31 December
1	(England) **Phil Taylor** 97.89	**4**
Q	(Northern Ireland) Colin McGarry 81.79	0
16	(England) **Dennis Priestley** 83.02	**4**
Q	(England) Ritchie Buckle 84.18	3
8	(England) Denis Ovens 85.70	3
(England) **Alex Roy** 85.49	**4**
9	(England) **Alan Warriner** 94.95	**4**
(England) John Lowe 90.26	3
5	(England) **Colin Lloyd** 98.62	**4**
(England) Peter Evison 78.84	1
12	(England) **Wayne Mardle** 92.61	**4**
Q	(England) Steve Maish 87.09	2
4	(Netherlands) Roland Scholten 88.05	2
(England) **Lionel Sams** 88.78	**4**
13	(Wales) Richie Burnett 82.21	3
(England) **Simon Whatley** 80.06	**4**
2	(Canada) John Part 90.09	3
(England) **Mark Dudbridge** 88.99	**4**
15	(Scotland) Jamie Harvey 79.00	0
(England) **Steve Beaton** 87.58	**4**
7	(England) **Ronnie Baxter** 86.85	**4**
Q	(Belgium) Erik Clarys 82.53	2
10	(England) **Kevin Painter** 88.62	**4**
(England) Paul Williams 82.47	3
6	(England) **Dennis Smith** 81.77	**4**
(England) Les Fitton 82.24	2
11	(England) Andy Jenkins 77.97	1
(England) **Bob Anderson** 83.98	**4**
3	(England) **Peter Manley** 89.34	**4**
Q	(Wales) Wayne Atwood 85.60	3
14	(England) Dave Askew 75.32	3
(England) **Keith Deller** 76.60	**4**

**Fourth round** (best of 7 sets); 1 January
1	(England) **Phil Taylor** 94.50	**4**
16	(England) Dennis Priestley 87.06	1
(England) Alex Roy 85.33	3
9	(England) **Alan Warriner** 82.97	**4**
5	(England) Colin Lloyd 87.39	3
12	(England) **Wayne Mardle** 91.01	**4**
(England) Lionel Sams 83.77	1
(England) **Simon Whatley** 82.84	**4**
(England) **Mark Dudbridge** 84.36	**4**
(England) Steve Beaton 77.62	1
7	(England) Ronnie Baxter 89.62	2
10	(England) **Kevin Painter** 90.74	**4**
6	(England) Dennis Smith 86.21	3
(England) **Bob Anderson** 86.23	**4**
3	(England) **Peter Manley** 93.33	**4**
(England) Keith Deller 92.58	2

**Quarter-finals** (best of 9 sets); 2 January
1	(England) **Phil Taylor** 98.15	**5**
9	(England) Alan Warriner 90.35	1
12	(England) **Wayne Mardle** 87.93	**5**
(England) Simon Whatley 77.24	1
(England) Mark Dudbridge 83.37	1
10	(England) **Kevin Painter** 90.26	**5**
(England) **Bob Anderson** 90.91	**5**
3	(England) Peter Manley 89.87	2

**Semi-finals** (best of 11 sets); 3 January
1	(England) **Phil Taylor** 99.61	**6**
12	(England) Wayne Mardle 96.49	2
10	(England) **Kevin Painter** 96.71	**6**
(England) Bob Anderson 88.95	0

**Final** (best of 13 sets); 4 January
1	(England) **Phil Taylor** 96.00	**7**
10	(England) Kevin Painter 90.47	6

== Representation from different countries ==
This table shows the number of players by country in the World Championship, the total number including round 1&2.

	(England) ENG	(Netherlands) NED	(Scotland) SCO	(Australia) AUS	(Wales) WAL	(Northern Ireland) NIR	(Belgium) BEL	(Canada) CAN	(United States) USA	(Japan) JPN	(Guyana) GUY	Total
Final	2	0	0	0	0	0	0	0	0	0	0	2
Semis	4	0	0	0	0	0	0	0	0	0	0	4
Quarters	8	0	0	0	0	0	0	0	0	0	0	8
Round 4	16	0	0	0	0	0	0	0	0	0	0	16
Round 3	25	1	1	0	2	1	1	1	0	0	0	32
Round 2	11	0	1	0	1	1	1	0	1	0	0	16
Round 1	5	1	1	1	1	1	1	1	2	1	1	16
Total	32	2	2	1	2	1	1	2	3	1	1	48
