= Steve Alker =

Welsh darts player

Personal information
- Nickname: "The Snakeman"
- Born: 14 February 1964 (age 62) Cardiff, Wales
- Home town: Pontyberem, Wales

Sport
- Sport: Darts
- Playing since: 1985
- Darts: 10g Unicorn
- Laterality: Right-handed
- Walk-on music: "Real Wild Child (Wild One)" by Iggy Pop

Organisation (see split in darts)
- BDO: 1998–2005, 2007–2019
- PDC: 2005–2006

WDF major events – best performances
- World Championship: Last 32: 2001
- World Masters: Last 32: 2002, 2016, 2017

PDC premier events – best performances
- World Championship: Last 16: 2006
- UK Open: Last 32: 2005

Other tournament wins
- Tournament: Years
- Welsh Open: 1998

Steve "Snakeman" Alker (born 14 February 1964) is a Welsh former professional darts player who competed in British Darts Organisation (BDO) and Professional Darts Corporation (PDC) events.

== Career ==
Alker won the 1998 Welsh Open, beating Colin Monk in the final. He was also a semi-finalist in the 2000 British Open. He played in the 2001 BDO World Darts Championship and 2002 Winmau World Masters but lost in the first round of both tournaments.

At the 2005 UK Open, where starting in the preliminary round, he went on to win five matches, including a victory over Kevin Painter before losing to Phil Taylor in the fifth round. In the 2006 PDC World Darts Championship he reached the last 16, beating Alan Caves and Denis Ovens before losing to Wayne Jones.

Alker quit the BDO in 2019.

== Personal life ==
Alker and his wife were convicted in 2016 of animal welfare offences and banned from keeping animals for ten years.

== World Championship results ==
=== BDO ===
- 2001: 1st Round (lost to Matt Clark 0–3)

=== PDC ===
- 2006: 3rd Round (lost to Wayne Jones 1–4)
