= 2006 Malta Open darts =

Malta Open

Tournament information
- Dates: 25 November 2006
- Country: Malta
- Organisation(s): BDO, WDF, MDA
- Winner's share: Lm 500

Champion(s)
- (Germany) Michael Rosenauer

2006 Malta Open was a darts tournament part of the annual, Malta Open, which took place in Malta in 2006.

== Results ==
| Round | Player |
|---|---|
| Winner | (Germany) Michael Rosenauer |
| Final | (Malta) Godfrey Abela |
| Semi-finals | (Malta) Vincent Busuttil |
| Semi-finals | (England) Tony Eccles |
| Quarter-finals | (Greece) John Michael |
| Quarter-finals | (England) Joe Palmer |
| Quarter-finals | (England) Andy Keen |
| Quarter-finals | (Malta) Emmanuel Ciantar |
| Last 16 | (Malta) Charles Ghiller |
| Last 16 | (England) David Davies |
| Last 16 | (England) Roy Brown |
| Last 16 | (Germany) Colin Rice |
| Last 16 | (England) Alan Yates |
| Last 16 | (Malta) Godwin Cesareo |
| Last 16 | (Netherlands) Pieter Otten |
| Last 16 | (England) Michael Lloyd |
| Last 32 | (Northern Ireland) Ian Branks |
| Last 32 | (England) Johnny Haines |
| Last 32 | (England) Dave Jowett |
| Last 32 | (England) Andy Callaby |
| Last 32 | (Germany) Andreas Krockel |
| Last 32 | (England) Mark Landers |
| Last 32 | (England) David Platt |
| Last 32 | (England) Alan Green |
| Last 32 | (England) Martin Burchell |
| Last 32 | (England) Andy Hayfield |
| Last 32 | (England) Kevin Edwards |
| Last 32 | (Scotland) Jason Clark |
| Last 32 | (Wales) Richie Burnett |
| Last 32 | (Netherlands) Coen Wiekamp |
| Last 32 | (England) Gary Noonan |
| Last 32 | (England) Ian Whillis |
