= Andy Callaby =

English darts player (born 1965)

Personal information
- Nickname: Super Cally
- Born: 10 March 1965 (age 61) Wisbech, Cambridgeshire, England

Sport
- Sport: Darts
- Playing since: 2004
- Darts: 21g Rab Smith
- Laterality: Right-handed

Organisation (see split in darts)
- PDC: 2004–2010

PDC premier events – best performances
- World Grand Prix: Quarter-final: 2004
- UK Open: Quarter-final: 2006
- Desert Classic: Last 16: 2005

Andy Callaby (born 10 March 1965) is an English former professional darts player who competed in Professional Darts Corporation (PDC) events.

== Career ==
Callaby made his first appearance in a PDC tournament by qualifying for the 2004 World Grand Prix, when he made an instant impact by defeating then-defending champion Phil Taylor in the first round, a result frequently cited as one of the biggest shocks in darts history. Callaby then went on to defeat former world champion Dennis Priestley to reach the quarter finals, before being defeated by eventual finalist Alan Warriner-Little.

This appearance proved to be his only televised appearance in 2004, but he would return to a major tournament at the 2005 UK Open, losing in the third round to Andy Belton., before qualifying for the Las Vegas Desert Classic, where his run to the last sixteen saw him defeat Mark Dudbridge before falling to finalist Wayne Mardle.

Having failed to qualify for that year's World Championship, his next major appearance would be a return to the UK Open in 2006, in which he equalled his best major result in running to the quarter-finals, defeating John Part in the fifth round before losing out 11-5 to Alan Tabern. He would also return to the World Grand Prix later that year, but despite beating Kevin Painter in the first round, he was unable to repeat his 2004 heroics, losing out in the next round, once again to an eventual finalist, Terry Jenkins.

His last PDC major appearance was in 2007, losing in the fifth round of the UK Open. He continued to play sporadically on the PDC Pro Tour until 2010.

== Performance timeline ==
Tournament	2004	2005	2006	2007
UK Open	DNQ	3R	QF	5R
World Grand Prix	QF	DNQ	2R	DNQ
Las Vegas Desert Classic	DNQ	L16	DNQ	

PDC Players Championships

Season	1	2	3	4	5	6	7	8	9	10	11	12	13	14	15	16	17	18	19	20	21	22	23	24	25	26	27	28	29	30	31	32	33	34	35	36	37
2004	Did not participate			ROT; L64	EDI; DNP																																
2005	IOW; SF	IOW; L64	BLA; DNP	NEW; L32	DUB; DNP	IRV; L64	LIS; L64	LIS; L64																													
2006	Did not participate			BLA; L128	NEW; L256	DUB; L32	IRV; L64	LIS; DNP																													
2007	Did not participate								LVE; L128	BLA; L256	Did not participate																										
2008	Did not participate																																				
2009	DON; L32	Did not participate				IRV; L128	Did not participate																		DUB; L64	Did not participate				IRV; L128	IRV; L128						
2010	GIB; DNP		SWI; L128	DER; L128	GLA; L128	GLA; L128	WIG; L64	CRA; DNP	BAR; L128	DER; L128	WIG; L128	DNP			BAR; L64	BAR; L128	Did not participate								CRA; L128	CRA; L128	Did not participate							BAR; L128	BAR; L128	DER; DNP	

Performance Table Legend
W	Won the tournament	F	Finalist	SF	Semifinalist	QF	Quarterfinalist	#R; RR; L#	Lost in # round Round-robin; Last # stage	DQ	Disqualified
DNQ	Did not qualify	DNP	Did not participate	WD	Withdrew	NH	Tournament not held	#R; RR; L#	Lost in # round Round-robin; Last # stage	NYF	Not yet founded
