= Norman Madhoo =

Guyanese darts player

Personal information
- Nickname: "The Storm"
- Born: 9 April 1964 (age 62) Georgetown, Guyana
- Home town: Georgetown, Guyana

Sport
- Sport: Darts
- Playing since: 1992
- Darts: 23 gram Bottelsen
- Laterality: Right-handed
- Walk-on music: "Old School" by Carlos Torre

Organisation (see split in darts)
- BDO: 2018–2019
- PDC: 2002–

PDC premier events – best performances
- World Championship: Last 48: 2004

Other tournament wins
- Years
ADO Glenn Silva Memorial / Florida Open	2012
Caribbean and South American Masters	2003, 2009, 2010
CDLC Tour (x4)	2023 (x2), 2024, 2026
Cherry Bomb International	2014

Norman Madhoo (born 9 April 1964) is a Guyanese professional darts player.

He is a three-time winner of the Caribbean and South American Masters, claiming the titles in 2003, 2009 and 2010. Madhoo first qualified for the PDC World Darts Championship in 2004, losing in the first round to Steve Smith.

He qualified again in 2010, losing to Canada's Ken MacNeil by 4 legs to 2 in the preliminary round. He qualified for his third PDC World Championship in 2011, where he was beaten by South Africa's Devon Petersen by 4 legs to 3 in the preliminary round.

In 2012, Madhoo won the Florida Open by beating Don Carrico in the final.

== World Championship results ==
=== PDC ===
- 2004: Last 48 (lost to Steve Smith 1–3) (sets)
- 2010: Last 72 (lost to Ken MacNeil 2–4) (legs)
- 2011: Last 72 (lost to Devon Petersen 3–4) (legs)
- 2024: Last 96 (lost to Jim Williams 0–3) (sets)
