= 2013 German Darts Masters =

Tournament information
- Dates: 20–22 September 2013
- Venue: Glaspalast
- Location: Sindelfingen
- Country: Germany
- Organisation(s): PDC
- Format: Legs
- Prize fund: £100,000
- Winner's share: £20,000

Champion(s)
- (England) Steve Beaton

The 2013 German Darts Masters was the seventh of eight PDC European Tour events on the 2013 PDC Pro Tour. The tournament took place at the Glaspalast in Sindelfingen, Germany, between 20–22 September 2013. It featured a field of 64 players and £100,000 in prize money, with £20,000 going to the winner.

Steve Beaton won his first European Tour title by defeating Mervyn King 6–5 in the final.

== Prize money ==
Stage (num. of players)		Prize money
Winner	(1)	£20,000
Runner-up	(1)	£10,000
Semi-finalists	(2)	£5,000
Quarter-finalists	(4)	£3,000
Third round losers	(8)	£2,000
Second round losers	(16)	£1,000
First round losers	(32)	£500
Total	£100,000	

== Qualification ==
The top 32 players from the PDC ProTour Order of Merit on the 2 July 2013 automatically qualified for the event. The remaining 32 places went to players from three qualifying events - 20 from the UK Qualifier (held in Barnsley on 12 July), eight from the European Qualifier and four from the Host Nations Qualifier (both held at the venue in Sindelfingen on 19 September).

Phil Taylor withdrew from the event before it started and was replaced by an additional European Qualifier. Ted Hankey suffered whiplash injuries a week earlier in a minor car crash and had not recovered in time to participate in the event. He was replaced by an additional Host Nation Qualifier.

1–32

1. (Netherlands) Michael van Gerwen (second round)
2. (Australia) Simon Whitlock (semi-finals)
3. (Scotland) Robert Thornton (third round)
4. (Scotland) Peter Wright (third round)
5. (England) Wes Newton (third round)
6. (England) Jamie Caven (third round)
7. (England) Dave Chisnall (third round)
8. ~~(England) Phil Taylor (withdrew)~~
9. (Belgium) Kim Huybrechts (second round)
10. (England) Adrian Lewis (second round)
11. (Canada) John Part (first round)
12. (Australia) Paul Nicholson (second round)
13. (England) Mervyn King (runner-up)
14. (England) Ian White (second round)
15. (Netherlands) Raymond van Barneveld (second round)
16. (England) Andy Hamilton (second round)
17. (Scotland) Gary Anderson (third round)
18. (England) Stuart Kellett (third round)
19. (Northern Ireland) Brendan Dolan (quarter-finals)
20. (England) Ronnie Baxter (second round)
21. (England) James Wade (quarter-finals)
22. (England) Steve Beaton (winner)
23. (England) Kevin Painter (quarter-finals)
24. (England) Andy Smith (first round)
25. (England) Colin Lloyd (second round)
26. (England) Justin Pipe (second round)
27. (England) Terry Jenkins (second round)
28. (England) Arron Monk (first round)
29. (England) Mark Walsh (first round)
30. (Wales) Richie Burnett (second round)
31. (England) Colin Osborne (first round)
32. (England) Wayne Jones (semi-finals)

UK Qualifier

- (England) Paul Amos (second round)
- (England) Kevin McDine (first round)
- (England) Michael Smith (second round)
- (England) Andy Jenkins (first round)
- (England) Mark Lawrence (first round)
- (England) James Hubbard (first round)
- (England) Darren Johnson (first round)
- (Northern Ireland) Daryl Gurney (first round)
- (England) Steve Brown (first round)
- (England) Josh Payne (first round)
- (England) Ricky Evans (first round)
- (England) Dennis Smith (first round)
- (Republic of Ireland) William O'Connor (first round)
- (England) Ross Smith (first round)
- (England) Jamie Robinson (second round)
- (England) Joe Murnan (first round)
- (England) Alan Tabern (first round)
- (Northern Ireland) Mickey Mansell (first round)
- ~~(England) Ted Hankey (withdrew)~~
- (England) Mick Todd (first round)

European Qualifier

- (Austria) Maik Langendorf (second round)
- (Netherlands) Ryan de Vreede (first round)
- (Netherlands) Mareno Michels (quarter-finals)
- (Croatia) Dragutin Horvat (first round)
- (Belgium) Ronny Huybrechts (first round)
- (Austria) Mensur Suljović (first round)
- (Netherlands) Jelle Klaasen (first round)
- (Austria) Michael Rasztovits (first round)
- (Netherlands) Vincent van der Voort (third round)

Home Nation Qualifier

- (Germany) Tomas Seyler (first round)
- (Germany) Michael Hurtz (first round)
- (Germany) Dirk Becker (first round)
- (Germany) Peter Schöffmann (first round)
- (Germany) Max Hopp (first round)

== Draw ==
First round (best of 11 legs); 20 September
1	(Netherlands) Michael van Gerwen 96.04	6
(England) Ricky Evans 91.02	4
32	(England) Wayne Jones 99.00	6
(England) Ross Smith 92.44	4
16	(England) Andy Hamilton 90.23	6
(Northern Ireland) Mickey Mansell 88.09	5
17	(Scotland) Gary Anderson 94.78	6
(England) Andy Jenkins 92.59	5
Alt	(Netherlands) Vincent van der Voort 86.42	6
(Northern Ireland) Daryl Gurney 86.79	3
25	(England) Colin Lloyd 97.44	6
(England) James Hubbard 80.46	1
9	(Belgium) Kim Huybrechts 84.12	6
(England) Darren Johnson 81.40	1
24	(England) Andy Smith 81.51	2
(Netherlands) Mareno Michels 83.56	6
5	(England) Wes Newton 93.63	6
(Netherlands) Ryan de Vreede 89.02	3
28	(England) Arron Monk 89.24	5
(Austria) Maik Langendorf 91.45	6
12	(Australia) Paul Nicholson 95.48	6
(England) Mark Lawrence 86.11	3
21	(England) James Wade 94.82	6
(England) Kevin McDine 93.25	5
4	(Scotland) Peter Wright 96.38	6
(Netherlands) Jelle Klaasen 92.02	5
29	(England) Mark Walsh 85.40	5
(England) Jamie Robinson 81.49	6
13	(England) Mervyn King 90.37	6
(Austria) Michael Rasztovits 87.24	2
20	(England) Ronnie Baxter 100.72	6
(England) Dennis Smith 97.28	3
2	(Australia) Simon Whitlock 104.01	6
(Austria) Mensur Suljović 95.78	3
31	(England) Colin Osborne 83.89	4
(England) Michael Smith 84.96	6
15	(Netherlands) Raymond van Barneveld 87.00	6
(England) Josh Payne 85.75	4
18	(England) Stuart Kellett 90.04	6
(England) Alan Tabern 86.37	3
7	(England) Dave Chisnall 100.20	6
(Germany) Dirk Becker 60.97	0
26	(England) Justin Pipe 99.15	6
(England) Joe Murnan 84.57	2
10	(England) Adrian Lewis 98.27	6
(Germany) Michael Hurtz 89.32	3
23	(England) Kevin Painter 94.11	6
(Belgium) Ronny Huybrechts 88.81	3
6	(England) Jamie Caven 94.26	6
(England) Steve Brown 91.43	5
27	(England) Terry Jenkins 101.49	6
(Germany) Peter Schofmann 78.67	1
11	(Canada) John Part 80.95	5
(England) Paul Amos 82.07	6
22	(England) Steve Beaton 103.66	6
(England) Mick Todd 96.00	0
3	(Scotland) Robert Thornton 87.36	6
(Germany) Max Hopp 82.79	2
30	(Wales) Richie Burnett 92.12	6
(Republic of Ireland) William O'Connor 84.77	4
14	(England) Ian White 85.82	6
(Croatia) Dragutin Horvat 86.17	5
19	(Northern Ireland) Brendan Dolan 92.97	6
(Germany) Tomas Seyler 75.28	0

Second round (best of 11 legs); 21 September
1	(Netherlands) van Gerwen 91.33	5
32	(England) Jones 85.48	6
16	(England) Hamilton 93.17	0
17	(Scotland) Anderson 98.02	6
Alt	(Netherlands) van der Voort 90.00	6
25	(England) Lloyd 92.68	3
9	(Belgium) K. Huybrechts 91.29	4
(Netherlands) Michels 90.70	6
5	(England) Newton 94.86	6
(Austria) Langendorf 89.54	5
12	(Australia) Nicholson 90.08	4
21	(England) Wade 84.94	6
4	(Scotland) Wright 99.76	6
(England) Robinson 89.72	2
13	(England) King 97.13	6
20	(England) Baxter 93.97	3
2	(Australia) Whitlock 96.91	6
(England) M. Smith 88.11	2
15	(Netherlands) van Barneveld 82.60	5
18	(England) Kellett 86.46	6
7	(England) Chisnall 98.63	6
26	(England) Pipe 93.60	3
10	(England) Lewis 90.76	5
23	(England) Painter 89.32	6
6	(England) Caven 90.38	6
27	(England) T. Jenkins 89.50	5
(England) Amos 75.62	1
22	(England) Beaton 92.26	6
3	(Scotland) Thornton 89.29	6
30	(Wales) Burnett 72.84	0
14	(England) White 92.70	2
19	(Northern Ireland) Dolan 93.93	6

Third round (best of 11 legs); 22 September
32	(England) Jones 95.28	6
17	(Scotland) Anderson 95.21	4
Alt	(Netherlands) van der Voort 90.87	1
(Netherlands) Michels 87.03	6
12	(England) Newton 94.39	3
21	(England) Wade 97.91	6
4	(Scotland) Wright 93.20	5
13	(England) King 95.08	6
2	(Australia) Whitlock 91.74	6
18	(England) Kellett 89.52	5
7	(England) Chisnall 101.94	1
23	(England) Painter 101.12	6
6	(England) Caven 86.66	1
22	(England) Beaton 96.30	6
3	(Scotland) Thornton 94.33	3
19	(Northern Ireland) Dolan 92.36	6

Quarter-finals (best of 11 legs); 22 September
32	(England) Jones 83.50	6
(Netherlands) Michels 79.03	0
21	(England) Wade 81.27	0
13	(England) King 85.08	6
2	(Australia) Whitlock 98.68	6
23	(England) Painter 90.22	3
22	(England) Beaton 98.30	6
19	(Northern Ireland) Dolan 96.74	2

Semi-finals (best of 11 legs); 22 September
32	(England) Jones 89.52	4
13	(England) King 91.06	6
2	(Australia) Whitlock 92.93	3
22	(England) Beaton 100.13	6

Final (best of 11 legs); 22 September
13	(England) King 87.14	5
22	(England) Beaton 90.79	6
