= 2007 UK Open =

2007 Blue Square UK Open

Tournament information
- Dates: 7–10 June 2007
- Venue: Reebok Stadium
- Location: Bolton
- Country: England
- Organisation(s): PDC
- Format: Legs; Final – best of 31
- Prize fund: £150,000
- Winner's share: £30,000
- Nine-dart finish: (England) Phil Taylor
- High checkout: 170 (England) Colin Osborne

Champion(s)
- (Netherlands) Raymond van Barneveld

The 2007 Blue Square UK Open was the fifth year of the PDC's UK Open darts tournament where, following numerous regional qualifying heats throughout Britain, players competed in a single elimination tournament to be crowned champion. The tournament took place at the Reebok Stadium, Bolton, England, between 7–10 June 2007. Blue Square took over as title sponsor after Budweiser's three-year deal expired.

There were two changes being introduced this year where a tournament bracket was introduced from the quarter-final stage to prevent players being forced into playing long back-to-back matches. Previously there had been a random draw after each round and the tournament had earned the nickname the "FA Cup of darts" as a result. The number of players was expanded from 128 to 168 for the 2007 tournament, but due to players tied on 168th position in the Order of Merit the starting field was 176 players.

Raymond van Barneveld defended his title, by defeating fellow Dutchman Vincent van der Voort 16–8 in the final.

== Prize money ==
Stage (no. of players)		Prize money (Total: £150,000)
Winner	(1)	£30,000
Runner-Up	(1)	£15,000
Semi-finalists	(2)	£8,500
Quarter-finalists	(4)	£4,000
Last 16 (fifth round)	(8)	£2,000
Last 32 (fourth round)	(16)	£1,500
Last 64 (third round)	(32)	£1,000
Last 96 (second round)	(32)	n/a
Last 128 (first round)	(32)	n/a
Last 160 (preliminary round)	(32)	n/a
Nine-dart finish	(1)	£15,000

== Format ==
Qualifying events are held at Punch Taverns pubs across the UK – winners from each pub event progress to one of four Regional Finals, to be staged in their relevant area. Players who reach the final eight in the Regional Finals will qualify for the televised stages of the UK Open in Bolton.

In addition there are eight UK Open Regional Finals for the "professional" players. All events are open to all darts players on payment of an entry fee – which means that players from both the PDC and BDO are eligible to enter. Players who enter through the Punch Taverns Qualifying round are not eligible to play in the regional qualifying events and vice versa.

The results of the eight qualifiers are then collated into an Order of Merit table (winner £4000; runner-up £2000; 3–4 £1000; 5–8 £500; 9–16 £250; 17–32 £100; 33–64 £50). This was raised to winner £5000; runner-up £2500; 3–4 £1250; 5–8 £600; 9–16 £300; 17–32 £150; 33–64 £75 from January 2007. The top 128 players (plus ties) in this Order of Merit join the 32 Punch Taverns qualifiers at the televised stages in Bolton.

The format for the event changes in 2007 to allow the tournament to expand by an extra day, and increase the number of players in the field.

- Day 1, Preliminary round – best of 15 legs

16 Matches drawn from a pool of 32 Punch Taverns Qualifiers and the 31 players with £50 or £75 in UK Open Order of Merit

1st round – best of 15 legs

32 Matches with 16 Preliminary round survivors, the remaining 31 players who were not drawn in Preliminary round and players ranked 97–113 in UK Open Order of Merit

- Day 2, 2nd round – best of 15 legs

Players ranked 65 to 96 join the first round winners.

3rd round – best of 15 legs

Players ranked 33 to 64 join the second round winners.

- Day 3, 4th round – best of 21 legs

Players ranked in the top 32 join the third round winners.

5th round – best of 21 legs

Last 32 of competition

6th round – best of 21 legs

Last 16 of competition followed by draw for quarter-finals in bracket form to avoid players being drawn in consecutive matches.

- Day 4, Quarter-finals – best of 21 legs

Semi-finals – best of 21 legs
Final – best of 31 legs

== UK Open Regional Final results ==
The UK Open Order of Merit was based on the results of the eight qualifying events across the UK. The eight final results were:-

24 September 2006 (Wales) Phil Taylor 2–1 Adrian Lewis
22 October (Ireland) Raymond van Barneveld 2–1 Colin Lloyd
5 November (Scotland) Raymond van Barneveld 2–0 Barrie Bates
6 January 2007 (North-East) Raymond van Barneveld 2–0 Roland Scholten
11 February (South-West) Dennis Priestley 2–0 James Wade
4 March (South) Phil Taylor 2–0 Wayne Mardle
18 March (North-West) James Wade 2–0 Terry Jenkins
1 April (Midlands) Andy Hamilton 2–0 James Wade

== Results ==
Collated results from later stages:-

=== Fourth round ===
- Board One

(England) Chris Mason 4–11 Mervyn King (England)
(England) Tony Eccles 8–11 Michael van Gerwen (Netherlands)
(England) Peter Manley 3–11 Phil Taylor (England)
(Northern Ireland) John MaGowan 1–11 Raymond van Barneveld (Netherlands)

- Board Two

(Wales) Barrie Bates 9–11 Adrian Lewis (England)
(Netherlands) Roland Scholten 5–11 James Wade (England)
(England) Dennis Smith 4–11 Colin Lloyd (England)
(England) Wayne Mardle 7–11 Denis Ovens (England)

- Board Three

(England) Kevin Painter 11–6 Nigel Birch (England)
(England) Kevin McDine 7–11 Alan Green (England)
(England) Wayne Jones 11–4 Gary Spedding (England)
(England) Darren Johnson 6–11 Brendan Dolan (Northern Ireland)

- Board Four

(Canada) John Part 11-7 Garrett Gray (Republic of Ireland)
(England) Steve Hine 11–1 Alan Tabern (England)
(Wales) Richie Burnett 11–9 Jelle Klaasen (Netherlands)
(England) Colin Osborne 11–10 Steve Maish (England)

- Board Five

(England) Terry Jenkins 11–8 Andy Roberts (Wales)
(England) Andy Smith 11–9 Robbie Green (England)
(England) Dennis Priestley 11–5 Mick McGowan (Republic of Ireland)
(England) Mark Dudbridge 11–8 Simon Whatley (England)

- Board Six

(England) Sam Rooney 11–6 Gary Welding (England)
(Wales) Wayne Atwood 7–11 Andy Callaby (England)
(Republic of Ireland) Owen Caffrey 11–6 Jason Clark (Scotland)
(Netherlands) Vincent van der Voort 11–5 John Kuczynski (United States)

- Board Seven

(England) Steve Beaton 7–11 Adrian Gray (England)
(England) Mark Holden 11–8 Andy Jenkins (England)
(England) Alex Roy 11–5 Lee Palfreyman (England)
(England) Andy Hamilton 7–11 Darren Webster (England)

- Board Eight

(England) Colin Monk 11–8 Tony Randell (England)
(England) Steve Smith 11–8 Alan Reynolds (Wales)
(Australia) David Platt 11–7 Mark Lawrence (England)
(England) Wes Newton 11–8 Jimmy Mann (England)

5th Round best of 21 legs losers £1,500
(Netherlands) Vincent van der Voort	11
(England) Alex Roy	3
(Wales) Richie Burnett	11
(England) Sam Rooney	6
(England) Terry Jenkins	11
(Australia) David Platt	3
(England) Mark Dudbridge	11
(England) Adrian Lewis	7
(England) Colin Osborne	11
(Netherlands) Michael van Gerwen	7
(England) Mervyn King	11
(England) Denis Ovens	5
(England) Alan Green	11
(England) Andy Callaby	4
(England) Darren Webster	11
(England) James Wade	7
(Netherlands) Raymond van Barneveld	11
(Canada) John Part	10
(England) Wayne Jones	11
(England) Mark Holden	6
(England) Phil Taylor	11
(England) Wes Newton	5
(England) Dennis Priestley	11
(Northern Ireland) Brendan Dolan	4
(England) Colin Lloyd	11
(England) Andy Smith	7
(England) Kevin Painter	11
(England) Steve Smith	7
(England) Steve Hine	11
(England) Adrian Gray	6
(England) Colin Monk	11
(Republic of Ireland) Owen Caffrey	7

6th Round best of 21 legs losers £2,000
v der Voort	11
Burnett	5
T. Jenkins	11
Dudbridge	4
Osborne	11
King	10
A. Green	11
Webster	8
v Barneveld	11
W. Jones	5
Taylor	11
Priestley	3
Lloyd	11
Painter	9
Hine	11
Monk	8

Quarter-finals best of 21 legs losers £4,000
v der Voort 80.68	11
T. Jenkins 86.25	10
Osborne 89.86	11
A. Green 85.39	6
v Barneveld 96.08	11
Taylor 97.14	4
Lloyd 94.90	11
Hine 84.82	6

Semi-finals best of 21 legs losers £8,500
v der Voort 89.17	11
Osborne 89.19	10
v Barneveld 102.82	11
Lloyd 95.23	4

Final best of 31 legs winner £30,000; Runner-up £15,000
Vincent van der Voort 88.76	8
Raymond van Barneveld 94.99	16

Random draws were made after each round up to the quarter-final stage; draw bracket has been compiled retrospectively.

== Tournament Review ==
=== Day One – Thursday 7 June 2007 ===
The first round was played on Thursday and featured 81 players competing for a place in the second round. Winmau World Masters champion Michael van Gerwen, playing his first match on Sky Television in the UK, beat 37-year-old Chris McTernan a pub qualifier from Bacup. Former World Champion Richie Burnett and Cliff Lazarenko also played on the opening day – both progressing to the second round.

=== Day Two – Friday 8 June 2007 ===
There were very few shocks on day two of the tournament, although former world champions Bob Anderson and Keith Deller, who were both struggling for form, were both knocked out. Cliff Lazarenko's run in the event ended in the third round. The draw for the fourth round, featuring the top 32 players in the world was staged at the end of Friday's play.

=== Day Three – Saturday 9 June 2007 ===
64 players remained when matches got underway on Saturday afternoon, after a late night on Friday. Raymond Barneveld would book a place in Round 5 with an 11–1 win over John "Mr. Magoo" MaGowan, who he defeated 11–7 in the Semi-finals twelve months ago. It was a different story against John Part with less doubles hit for Barney (compared to 80% against MaGowan). Part led 10–9, but van Barneveld squeezed through to hit double 16 and edge a great match 11–10.

Phil Taylor achieved his third nine dart finish at Bolton in the fifth round against Wes Newton – it is also his fifth televised perfect game. Taylor was playing on the second main stage and whilst his match was in progress Colin Osborne was on his way to an 11–7 victory against Michael van Gerwen, including a 170 finish within moments of Taylor hitting the nine-darter. Osborne also saw off Mervyn King 11–10 – his second deciding leg victory of the day to reach the quarter-finals. Kevin Painter came within one dart of matching Phil Taylor's nine-darter missing double 12 for the finish which would have been the first time that a tournament had witnessed two nine-darters on the same day.

The draw for the final day's matches took place at the end of Saturday's play and the quarter-final line-up featured a repeat of the previous year's quarter-final between Phil Taylor and Raymond van Barneveld.

=== Day Four – Sunday 10 June 2007 ===
The tournament reached the quarter-finals stage and the first match on the main board saw Vincent van der Voort come from 0–5 behind to edge out Premier League finalist Terry Jenkins 11–10 to reach his first PDC semi-final. Colin Osborne beat Alan Green 11–6 on board two. Colin Lloyd followed on board two with another comeback, having been 0–4 behind he beat Steve Hine 11–6.

The clash between the world's top two ranked players ended with a convincing victory for Raymond van Barneveld against Phil Taylor. Van Barneveld won four successive legs from 3–2 up and then further extended his lead to 9–3. Taylor took the 13th leg when he took out 182 with a usual combination of a maximum 180 and double one on his next visit. But van Barneveld won the next leg to win 11–4 and give Taylor one of his heaviest defeats on television.

Vincent van der Voort produced a second successive 11–10 win to reach the final by beating Colin Osborne in the semi-final whilst defending champion Raymond van Barneveld had a more comfortable win 11–4 over Colin Lloyd – meaning he'd beaten his two rivals in the top three of the world rankings on the same day. In the final, van Barneveld raced to a 4–0 win hitting his double on the first attempt each time before van der Voort managed to get two legs on the scoreboard. Van Barneveld then took the next four legs, then further extended his lead to 13–5. Van der Voort tried to stay with van Barneveld and took three of the next five legs but a double top in the 24th leg sealed a second successive UK Open title for van Barneveld.
