= 2006 PDC World Darts Championship =

Tournament information
- Dates: 19 December 2005 – 2 January 2006
- Venue: Circus Tavern
- Location: Purfleet
- Country: England
- Organisation(s): PDC
- Format: Sets; Final – best of 13
- Prize fund: £500,000
- Winner's share: £100,000
- High checkout: 170; Jimmy Mann; Phil Taylor

Champion(s)
- Phil Taylor

The 2006 PDC World Darts Championship (known for sponsorship reasons as the 2006 Ladbrokes.com World Darts Championship) was the thirteenth World Championship organised by the Professional Darts Corporation (PDC) since it separated from the British Darts Organisation (BDO). It was held from 19 December 2005 to 2 January 2006 at the Circus Tavern, Purfleet, Essex.

== Format and qualifiers ==
A record field of 64 finalists assembled to battle for Phil Taylor's world crown. Play was not held between 22 December and Christmas Day due to the Christmas break. Play resumed on Boxing Day in the lead-up to the final. A day's break was also held on New Year's Eve for the New Year. Record prize money of £100,000 for the winner was on offer.

Despite the record field, there was a notable absentee. John Lowe's world ranking had fallen to a level which meant he was forced to qualify for the event – which he failed to do for the first time in his career. His run of 28 successive appearances (including the BDO World Championship) had come to an end. He was the last player to have appeared in a world championship each year since it began in 1978. Bob Anderson, who made his debut in 1984, now had the longest unbroken run – making his 23rd consecutive appearance for these championships.

A major shock came in the first round when world number one and top seed Colin Lloyd lost to Gary Welding – it was only the second time in the history of the PDC World Championship that the top seed fell in the first round (Peter Manley being the first in 2001). Welding, who had recovered from two sets down in his best-of-five-sets match against Lloyd, went on to reach the quarter-finals.

Phil Taylor became World Champion for the 13th time, this being his 11th PDC success. His toughest battle en route to the championship was a tight semi-final against Wayne Mardle which he managed to win by 6 sets to 5. The final was a more one-sided affair as Taylor overcame Peter Manley 7–0. It was Manley's third final defeat against Taylor and the second time he was whitewashed, mirroring the result of the 2002 final.

== Order of Merit ==
Order of Merit

1. (England) Colin Lloyd (first round)
2. (England) Phil Taylor (champion)
3. (England) Ronnie Baxter (first round)
4. (Netherlands) Roland Scholten (third round)
5. (England) Peter Manley (runner-up)
6. (England) Wayne Mardle (semi-finals)
7. (England) Kevin Painter (quarter-finals)
8. (England) Andy Jenkins (second round)
9. (England) Denis Ovens (second round)
10. (England) Mark Dudbridge (third round)
11. (Canada) John Part (third round)
12. (England) Mark Walsh (second round)
13. (England) Dennis Priestley (second round)
14. (England) Alan Warriner-Little (quarter-finals)
15. (England) Terry Jenkins (second round)
16. (England) Lionel Sams (first round)
17. (England) Steve Beaton (first round)
18. (England) Bob Anderson (first round)
19. (England) Dave Askew (first round)
20. (England) Adrian Lewis (quarter-finals)
21. (England) Dennis Smith (third round)
22. (England) Chris Mason (second round)
23. (England) Alex Roy (first round)
24. (England) Alan Caves (first round)
25. (England) James Wade (first round)
26. (England) Wes Newton (second round)
27. (Belgium) Erik Clarys (second round)
28. (England) Steve Maish (first round)
29. (Scotland) Jamie Harvey (first round)
30. (England) Colin Monk (first round)
31. (England) Matt Clark (second round)
32. (England) Darren Webster (first round)

PDPA Qualifiers

1. (England) Andy Smith (third round)
2. (England) Steve Hine (first round)
3. (Wales) Steve Alker (third round)
4. (Australia) David Platt (first round)
5. (England) Jimmy Mann (first round)
6. (Northern Ireland) Geoff Wylie (first round)
7. (England) Wayne Jones (semi-finals)
8. (England) Dave Whitcombe (first round)
9. (England) Gary Welding (quarter-finals)
10. (Scotland) Jason Clark (second round)
11. (England) Alan Tabern (second round)
12. (England) Dale Newton (first round)
13. (England) Kevin Spiolek (first round)
14. (Wales) Mark Salmon (first round)
15. (England) Dave Honey (first round)
16. (England) Andy Hamilton (third round)

International Qualifiers

- (United States) John Kuczynski (third round)
- (United States) Darin Young (first round)
- (United States) Ray Carver (second round)
- (Canada) Ken Woods (first round)
- (Canada) Gerry Convery (second round)
- (Australia) Brian Roach (first round)
- (New Zealand) Warren Parry (first round)
- (Northern Ireland) John MaGowan (first round)
- (Barbados) Winston Cadogan (first round)
- (Japan) Yasuhiko Matsunaga (first round)
- (China) Chengan Liu (first round)
- (Netherlands) Jan van der Rassel (second round)
- (Netherlands) Erwin Extercatte (second round)
- (Belgium) Patrick Bulen (first round)
- (Germany) Tomas Seyler (second round)
- (Germany) Andree Welge (first round)

== Prize money ==
Position (num. of players)		Prize money (Total: £500,000)
Winner	(1)	£100,000
Runner-Up	(1)	£50,000
Semi-finalists	(2)	£20,000
Quarter-finalists	(4)	£12,500
Third round losers	(8)	£8,500
Second round losers	(16)	£5,000
First round losers	(32)	£3,500

== Results ==
=== Finals ===
Quarter-finals (best of 9 sets); 30 December
(England) Gary Welding 75.48	0
(England) Wayne Jones 86.67	5
5	(England) Peter Manley 91.92	5
20	(England) Adrian Lewis 90.90	3
2	(England) Phil Taylor 105.57	5
7	(England) Kevin Painter 89.13	1
6	(England) Wayne Mardle 94.80	5
14	(England) Alan Warriner-Little 83.37	0

Semi-finals (best of 11 sets); 1 January
(England) Wayne Jones 91.29	0
5	(England) Peter Manley 98.43	6
2	(England) Phil Taylor 97.14	6
6	(England) Wayne Mardle 95.46	5

Final (best of 13 sets); 2 January
5	(England) Peter Manley 91.72	0
2	(England) Phil Taylor 106.74	7

=== Rounds 1-4 ===
First round (best of 5 sets); 19–22 December
1	(England) Colin Lloyd 95.70	2
(England) Gary Welding 90.25	3
32	(England) Darren Webster 86.47	2
Q	(Netherlands) Erwin Extercatte 83.19	3
16	(England) Lionel Sams 72.47	0
Q	(United States) John Kuczynski 81.98	3
17	(England) Steve Beaton 82.72	0
Q	(Netherlands) Jan van der Rassel 85.68	3
8	(England) Andy Jenkins 91.78	3
Q	(Belgium) Patrick Bulen 85.61	1
25	(England) James Wade 83.41	2
(England) Wayne Jones 85.11	3
9	(England) Denis Ovens 82.65	3
(Northern Ireland) Geoff Wylie 78.63	1
24	(England) Alan Caves 83.58	1
(Wales) Steve Alker 86.73	3
5	(England) Peter Manley 83.52	3
(England) Kevin Spiolek 70.44	0
28	(England) Steve Maish 87.77	2
(Scotland) Jason Clark 88.36	3
12	(England) Mark Walsh 89.68	3
Q	(New Zealand) Warren Parry 82.06	0
21	(England) Dennis Smith 87.29	3
(Wales) Mark Salmon 83.45	2
4	(Netherlands) Roland Scholten 84.97	3
(England) Dave Whitcombe 76.92	1
29	(Scotland) Jamie Harvey 80.96	0
Q	(Germany) Tomas Seyler 87.79	3
13	(England) Dennis Priestley 95.69	3
Q	(Northern Ireland) John MaGowan 86.78	1
20	(England) Adrian Lewis 90.50	3
(England) Dave Honey 83.20	0
2	(England) Phil Taylor 96.82	3
(Australia) David Platt 84.82	0
31	(England) Matt Clark 86.04	3
Q	(Canada) Ken Woods 83.27	0
15	(England) Terry Jenkins 99.34	3
(England) Jimmy Mann 94.13	2
18	(England) Bob Anderson 87.74	2
(England) Andy Hamilton 88.48	3
7	(England) Kevin Painter 86.46	3
(England) Dale Newton 76.59	1
26	(England) Wes Newton 81.98	3
Q	(Japan) Yasuhiko Matsunaga 74.55	0
10	(England) Mark Dudbridge 84.09	3
Q	(United States) Darin Young 78.58	0
23	(England) Alex Roy 90.35	2
(England) Alan Tabern 87.97	3
6	(England) Wayne Mardle 85.93	3
Q	(Australia) Brian Roach 74.00	1
27	(Belgium) Erik Clarys 80.28	3
Q	(Barbados) Winston Cadogan 60.00	0
11	(Canada) John Part 93.38	3
Q	(China) Chengan Liu 80.41	0
22	(England) Chris Mason 91.32	3
(England) Steve Hine 85.74	1
3	(England) Ronnie Baxter 89.91	2
Q	(United States) Ray Carver 87.71	3
30	(England) Colin Monk 80.36	0
(England) Andy Smith 87.77	3
14	(England) Alan Warriner-Little 78.18	3
Q	(Germany) Andree Welge 74.16	0
19	(England) Dave Askew 82.33	0
Q	(Canada) Gerry Convery 83.37	3

Second round (best of 7 sets); 26–28 December
(England) Welding 85.56	4
Q	(Netherlands) Extercatte 80.22	1
Q	(United States) Kuczynski 87.42	4
Q	(Netherlands) van der Rassel 84.18	3
8	(England) A. Jenkins 86.19	3
(England) Jones 88.62	4
9	(England) Ovens 86.91	1
(Wales) Alker 93.81	4
5	(England) Manley 84.24	4
(Scotland) J. Clark 85.11	3
12	(England) Walsh 77.61	0
21	(England) D. Smith 87.99	4
4	(Netherlands) Scholten 87.57	4
Q	(Germany) Seyler 84.87	2
13	(England) Priestley 87.57	2
20	(England) Lewis 92.79	4
2	(England) Taylor 102.39	4
31	(England) M. Clark 85.62	1
15	(England) T. Jenkins 93.03	1
(England) Hamilton 96.09	4
7	(England) Painter 86.67	4
26	(England) Newton 86.37	3
10	(England) Dudbridge 94.62	4
(England) Tabern 84.60	0
6	(England) Mardle 88.62	4
27	(Belgium) Clarys 77.79	1
11	(Canada) Part 95.46	4
22	(England) Mason 95.49	3
Q	(United States) Carver 87.78	3
(England) A. Smith 89.22	4
14	(England) Warriner-Little 87.63	4
Q	(Canada) Convery 78.96	0

Third round (best of 7 sets); 28–29 December
(England) Welding 83.31	4
Q	(United States) Kuczynski 84.09	2
(England) Jones 91.26	4
(Wales) Alker 92.37	1
5	(England) Manley 88.74	4
21	(England) D. Smith 86.67	3
4	(Netherlands) Scholten 92.28	3
20	(England) Lewis 95.13	4
2	(England) Taylor 108.30	4
(England) Hamilton 97.05	0
7	(England) Painter 95.73	4
10	(England) Dudbridge 91.98	1
6	(England) Mardle 92.19	4
11	(Canada) Part 93.39	2
(England) A. Smith 85.44	2
14	(England) Warriner-Little 86.34	4

Quarter-finals (best of 9 sets); 30 December
(England) Welding 75.48	0
(England) Jones 86.67	5
5	(England) Manley 91.92	5
20	(England) Lewis 90.90	3
2	(England) Taylor 105.57	5
7	(England) Painter 89.13	1
6	(England) Mardle 94.80	5
14	(England) Warriner-Little 83.37	0

== Representation from different countries ==
This table shows the number of players by country in the World Championship.

	(England) ENG	(Netherlands) NED	(Scotland) SCO	(Wales) WAL	(Belgium) BEL	(Australia) AUS	(Northern Ireland) NIR	(Germany) GER	(United States) USA	(Canada) CAN	(China) CHN	(Japan) JPN	(New Zealand) NZL	(Barbados) BAR	Total
Final	2	0	0	0	0	0	0	0	0	0	0	0	0	0	2
Semis	4	0	0	0	0	0	0	0	0	0	0	0	0	0	4
Quarters	8	0	0	0	0	0	0	0	0	0	0	0	0	0	8
Round 3	12	1	0	1	0	0	0	0	1	1	0	0	0	0	16
Round 2	21	3	1	1	1	0	0	1	2	2	0	0	0	0	32
Round 1	40	3	2	2	2	1	2	2	3	3	1	1	1	1	64
Total	40	3	2	2	2	1	2	2	3	3	1	1	1	1	64
