= Mareno Michels =

Dutch darts player (born 1984)

Personal information
- Nickname: The Miracle
- Born: 23 October 1984 (age 42) Dordrecht, Netherlands
- Home town: Dordrecht, Netherlands

Sport
- Sport: Darts
- Laterality: Right-handed
- Walk-on music: "Party Hard" by Andrew W.K.

Organisation (see split in darts)
- BDO: 2004–2010
- PDC: 2010–2020
- Current world ranking: -

WDF major events – best performances
- World Championship: Last 32: 2006, 2010
- World Masters: Last 64: 2006
- World Trophy: Quarter-final: 2005
- Int. Darts League: Last 32 group: 2006
- Finder Masters: Last 24 Group: 2009

PDC premier events – best performances
- World Championship: Last 64: 2014
- UK Open: Last 96: 2012

Other tournament wins
- Years
French Open	2008
Hungarian Open	2008
Open Holland	2009
West Brabant Open	2008

Mareno Michels (born 23 October 1984) is a Dutch darts player who competes in Professional Darts Corporation (PDC) events.

== Career ==
=== BDO ===
Michels made three quarter final appearances in the BDO Open events in 2005, doing so in the Welsh Open, English Open and the German Open. He followed it up with another quarter final appearance, this time at the World Darts Trophy, one of the WDF majors. He defeated Tony Martin and Simon Whitlock before losing to Mervyn King. He then made the final of the Swedish Open, losing to Tony Eccles.

Michels made his World Championship debut in 2006 but lost in the first round to Paul Hogan. It was a disappointing year for Michels, as he also suffered early exits in the World Darts Trophy and the International Darts League.

Despite a semi-final showing in the Dortmund Open, 2007 was also a disappointment. As well as early exits in open tournaments, Michels played in three PDC Pro Tour events in the Netherlands and Belgium, losing in the first round in all three tournaments.

2008 was an improvement for the Dutchman, winning his maiden open tournament with the unranked West Brabent Open. He followed it up with a second tournament win with the Hungarian Open, beating local favourite Nándor Bezzeg in the final.

On 27 September 2008 Michels added the 2008 WDF French Open to his growing list of titles defeating Welshman Robert Hughes in the final five legs to four. Despite his two ranking tournament wins, Michels did not earn enough points to earn a place in the 2009 BDO World Darts Championship and was forced to qualify for the event, but lost in the second round to Belgium's Kim Huybrechts.

Michels has been able to maintain his form in 2009, reaching the semi-finals in the Vonderke Masters, German Gold Cup, Dortmund Open and the Swiss Open as well as winning the Open Holland. This form helped Michels qualify for the 2010 BDO World Darts Championship. He was defeated 3–1 in the first round by John Henderson.

=== PDC ===
Michels switched to the PDC circuit shortly afterwards, taking part in his first Players Championship in Gibraltar. His PDC career started badly as he earned no money in his first eight events before finally winning £200 for a last 64 place in a Players Championship in Wigan. He failed to qualify for the 2010 UK Open, earning just £200 in eight qualifying events.

2011 proved to be a better year for Michels. He qualified for the UK Open where he lost in the first round to Antonio Alcinas and reached the last 16 of a Players Championship event in Canada.

In January 2012, he entered the PDC 'Q School' qualifying tournament. He didn't qualify directly through any of the four events, but did finish joint 7th on the Order of Merit, comfortably inside the top 24 who received a Tour Card. In April, Michels earned a place in the Austrian Darts Open by defeating Dyson Parody and Tobias Hontsch in the European qualifier. He played Simon Whitlock in the first round and lost 6–4. He also qualified for the second European Tour event, the German Darts Championship courtesy of wins over Ante Vranjeka and Gino Vos. Michels played compatriot Raymond van Barneveld in the first round of the event in Berlin and was beaten 6–1.

Michels failed to qualify for the 2013 UK Open as he finished 142nd on the Order of Merit, outside of the top 96 who claimed their places. He qualified for the European Darts Open, but lost 6–3 to Wes Newton in the first round. In September, Michels qualified for the German Darts Masters and beat Andy Smith 6–2 in the opening round, before coming back from 4–2 down to see off top 20 player Kim Huybrechts. Michels kept his run going with a 6–1 victory over compatriot Vincent van der Voort to reach the quarter-finals of a PDC event for the first time. However, the pressure of the occasion seemed to affect Michels as he averaged just 79.03 in a 6–0 defeat against Wayne Jones. His run in the event earned him £3,000 which was the main reason in Michels finishing the year ninth on the European Order of Merit which has seen him qualify for his first PDC World Championship by claiming the second of four spots which were available to non-qualified players. Michels played John Part in the first round and lost the first two sets and was 2–0 down in legs in the third. However, Michels rallied to win the set and the next by taking out 120 with treble 20, double 20, double 10 to level the game, but couldn't win a leg in the decider to bow out of the tournament 3–2.

Michels was 75th on the Order of Merit after the World Championship, outside of the top 64 who had full playing rights on the PDC. He entered Q School in an attempt to earn his place and lost in the final round 5–3 to Steve West on the fourth day. However, this result saw him finish inside the top 24 on the Q School Order of Merit to win a two-year tour card. Michels won three matches at the 10th Players Championship of the year, before losing 6–2 to Andy Hamilton in the last 16. This was very much Michels stand out display of 2014 as he could not get past the last 64 in any other event. He qualified for the 2015 German Darts Championship, but missed eight match darts during a 6–5 first round defeat to Ronny Huybrechts. In 2016 he played in all of the Challenge Tour events and reached the quarter-finals of the third one, where he lost 5–2 to Ryan Searle.

== World Championship results ==
=== BDO ===
- 2006: First round (lost to Paul Hogan 0–3)
- 2010: First round (lost to John Henderson 1–3)

=== PDC ===
- 2014: First round (lost to John Part 2–3)
