= 2013 European Darts Open =

Tournament information
- Dates: 17–19 May 2013
- Venue: Maritim Hotel
- Location: Düsseldorf
- Country: Germany
- Organisation(s): PDC
- Format: Legs
- Prize fund: £100,000
- Winner's share: £20,000

Champion(s)
- (Netherlands) Michael van Gerwen

The 2013 European Darts Open was the third of eight PDC European Tour events on the 2013 PDC Pro Tour. The tournament took place at the Maritim Hotel in Düsseldorf, Germany, from 17 to 19 May 2013. It featured a field of 64 players and £100,000 in prize money, with £20,000 going to the winner.

Michael van Gerwen won his first European Tour title with a 6–2 defeat of Simon Whitlock in the final.

== Prize money ==
Stage (num. of players)		Prize money
Winner	(1)	£20,000
Runner-up	(1)	£10,000
Semi-finalists	(2)	£5,000
Quarter-finalists	(4)	£3,000
Third round losers	(8)	£2,000
Second round losers	(16)	£1,000
First round losers	(32)	£500
Total	£100,000	

== Qualification ==
The top 32 players from the PDC ProTour Order of Merit on the 17 April 2013 automatically qualified for the event. The remaining 32 places went to players from three qualifying events - 20 from the UK Qualifier (held in Wigan on 26 April), eight from the European Qualifier and four from the Host Nation Qualifier (both held at the venue in Düsseldorf on 16 May).

1–32

1. (Netherlands) Michael van Gerwen (winner)
2. (Australia) Simon Whitlock (runner-up)
3. (England) Dave Chisnall (second round)
4. (England) Wes Newton (second round)
5. (Scotland) Robert Thornton (third round)
6. (Netherlands) Raymond van Barneveld (third round)
7. (England) Justin Pipe (quarter-finals)
8. (England) Ian White (second round)
9. (Canada) John Part (second round)
10. (England) Adrian Lewis (third round)
11. (Belgium) Kim Huybrechts (quarter-finals)
12. (Scotland) Peter Wright (semi-final)
13. (England) Andy Hamilton (quarter-finals)
14. (England) Phil Taylor (second round)
15. (Australia) Paul Nicholson (second round)
16. (England) Ronnie Baxter (second round)
17. (England) Terry Jenkins (third round)
18. (England) James Wade (third round)
19. (England) Mervyn King (third round)
20. (England) Colin Lloyd (first round)
21. (Wales) Mark Webster (second round)
22. (England) Stuart Kellett (second round)
23. (Wales) Richie Burnett (second round)
24. (Northern Ireland) Brendan Dolan (third round)
25. (Scotland) Gary Anderson (quarter-finals)
26. (England) Andy Smith (first round)
27. (England) Kevin Painter (second round)
28. (England) Mark Walsh (first round)
29. (England) Colin Osborne (third round)
30. (England) Jamie Caven (semi-finals)
31. (England) Arron Monk (second round)
32. (England) Wayne Jones (second round)

UK Qualifier

- (England) Dennis Smith (first round)
- (England) Andy Parsons (second round)
- (England) Stephen Hardy (first round)
- (England) Darren Johnson (first round)
- (England) Mark Cox (second round)
- (England) Steve Beaton (first round)
- (England) Mark Jones (first round)
- (India) Prakash Jiwa (first round)
- (England) Terry Temple (first round)
- (England) Steve Maish (first round)
- (Scotland) Keith Stephen (first round)
- (England) Alex Roy (second round)
- (England) Chris Aubrey (first round)
- (England) Paul Amos (first round)
- (England) Kevin Dowling (first round)
- (England) Kevin McDine (first round)
- (England) David Pallett (first round)
- (England) Matt Clark (first round)
- (England) Adam Hunt (first round)
- (England) Shaun Griffiths (first round)

European Qualifier

- (Belgium) Kurt van de Rijck (first round)
- (Netherlands) Mareno Michels (first round)
- (Netherlands) Bobby Biemans (first round)
- (Austria) Maik Langendorf (first round)
- (Austria) Mensur Suljović (first round)
- (Belgium) Ronny Huybrechts (first round)
- (Netherlands) Jelle Klaasen (first round)
- (Netherlands) Jerry Hendriks (first round)

Host Nation Qualifier

- (Germany) Max Hopp (first round)
- (Germany) Tomas Seyler (first round)
- (Germany) Jyhan Artut (first round)
- (Germany) Andree Welge (first round)

== Draw ==
First round (best of 11 legs); 17 May
1	(Netherlands) Michael van Gerwen 92.84	6
(Germany) Andree Welge 83.81	1
32	(England) Wayne Jones 93.32	6
(Netherlands) Bobby Biemans 84.54	1
16	(England) Ronnie Baxter 95.17	6
(Austria) Maik Langendorf 81.94	2
17	(England) Terry Jenkins 90.14	6
(England) Mark Jones 78.36	2
8	(England) Ian White 90.84	6
(England) Kevin Dowling 87.94	2
25	(Scotland) Gary Anderson 100.01	6
(England) Shaun Griffiths 92.79	1
9	(Canada) John Part 80.01	6
(Netherlands) Jerry Hendriks 75.19	1
24	(Northern Ireland) Brendan Dolan 95.20	6
(Netherlands) Jelle Klaasen 94.81	5
5	(Scotland) Robert Thornton 82.64	6
(Belgium) Kurt van de Rijck 79.56	5
28	(England) Mark Walsh 73.03	2
(England) Alex Roy 79.40	6
12	(Scotland) Peter Wright 91.96	6
(Belgium) Ronny Huybrechts 89.72	2
21	(Wales) Mark Webster 88.90	6
(England) Darren Johnson 84.46	1
4	(England) Wes Newton 86.63	6
(Netherlands) Mareno Michels 81.43	3
29	(England) Colin Osborne 90.38	6
(England) Terry Temple 78.91	4
13	(England) Andy Hamilton 92.46	6
(Austria) Mensur Suljović 90.93	5
20	(England) Colin Lloyd 88.20	5
(England) Andy Parsons 83.32	6
2	(Australia) Simon Whitlock 95.59	6
(Germany) Tomas Seyler 69.97	1
31	(England) Arron Monk 91.96	6
(England) Kevin McDine 88.73	5
15	(Australia) Paul Nicholson 89.13	6
(England) Stephen Hardy 75.65	1
18	(England) James Wade 97.51	6
(Germany) Jyhan Artut 90.67	2
7	(England) Justin Pipe 92.56	6
(Germany) Max Hopp 86.45	5
26	(England) Andy Smith 89.39	2
(England) Mark Cox 93.39	6
10	(England) Adrian Lewis 90.32	6
(Scotland) Keith Stephen 82.65	1
23	(Wales) Richie Burnett 84.09	6
(England) Steve Beaton 87.73	5
6	(Netherlands) Raymond van Barneveld 95.70	6
(England) Adam Hunt 94.14	5
27	(England) Kevin Painter 95.08	6
(England) David Pallett 84.70	3
11	(Belgium) Kim Huybrechts 96.71	6
(England) Steve Maish 90.90	1
22	(England) Stuart Kellett 95.18	6
(England) Dennis Smith 94.01	4
3	(England) Dave Chisnall 101.58	6
(England) Chris Aubrey 81.18	1
30	(England) Jamie Caven 89.61	6
(England) Paul Amos 80.38	3
14	(England) Phil Taylor 99.29	6
(England) Matt Clark 84.59	1
19	(England) Mervyn King 87.61	6
(India) Prakash Jiwa 89.25	5

Second round (best of 11 legs); 18 May
1	(Netherlands) van Gerwen 96.02	6
32	(England) Jones 90.53	5
16	(England) Baxter 91.74	4
17	(England) Jenkins 94.44	6
8	(England) White 94.15	3
25	(Scotland) Anderson 101.54	6
9	(Canada) Part 78.90	0
24	(Northern Ireland) Dolan 90.18	6
5	(Scotland) Thornton 90.52	6
(England) Roy 91.15	4
12	(Scotland) Wright 94.86	6
21	(Wales) Webster 89.35	3
4	(England) Newton 94.32	3
29	(England) Osborne 91.72	6
13	(England) Hamilton 83.64	6
(England) Parsons 75.45	3
2	(Australia) Whitlock 93.95	6
31	(England) Monk 83.90	4
15	(Australia) Nicholson 87.79	2
18	(England) Wade 92.28	6
7	(England) Pipe 86.63	6
(England) Cox 80.89	2
10	(England) Lewis 87.78	6
23	(Wales) Burnett 90.91	4
6	(Netherlands) van Barneveld 89.69	6
27	(England) Painter 83.77	1
11	(Belgium) K. Huybrechts 108.51	6
22	(England) Kellett 103.03	1
3	(England) Chisnall 90.97	3
30	(England) Caven 96.02	6
14	(England) Taylor 100.72	2
19	(England) King 93.58	6

Third round (best of 11 legs); 19 May
1	(Netherlands) van Gerwen 102.50	6
17	(England) Jenkins 98.53	3
25	(Scotland) Anderson 105.25	6
24	(Northern Ireland) Dolan 94.50	1
5	(Scotland) Thornton 96.33	4
12	(Scotland) Wright 97.59	6
29	(England) Osborne 86.52	1
13	(England) Hamilton 92.81	6
2	(Australia) Whitlock 96.33	6
18	(England) Wade 96.82	3
7	(England) Pipe 88.76	6
10	(England) Lewis 91.92	5
6	(Netherlands) van Barneveld 94.69	5
11	(Belgium) K. Huybrechts 100.39	6
30	(England) Caven 86.31	6
19	(England) King 90.10	5

Quarter-finals (best of 11 legs); 19 May
1	(Netherlands) van Gerwen 93.24	6
25	(Scotland) Anderson 89.43	3
12	(Scotland) Wright 97.83	6
13	(England) Hamilton 97.44	3
2	(Australia) Whitlock 99.47	6
7	(England) Pipe 89.36	2
11	(Belgium) K. Huybrechts 92.09	3
30	(England) Caven 92.49	6

Semi-finals (best of 11 legs); 19 May
1	(Netherlands) van Gerwen 98.88	6
12	(Scotland) Wright 94.28	3
2	(Australia) Whitlock 97.25	6
30	(England) Caven 89.19	4

Final (best of 11 legs); 19 May
1	(Netherlands) van Gerwen 106.68	6
2	(Australia) Whitlock 92.41	2
