= 2005 UK Open =

2005 Budweiser UK Open

Tournament information
- Dates: 10–12 June 2005
- Venue: Reebok Stadium
- Location: Bolton
- Country: England
- Organisation(s): PDC
- Format: Legs
- Prize fund: £124,000
- Winner's share: £30,000
- Nine-dart finish: (England) Phil Taylor

Champion(s)
- (England) Phil Taylor

The 2005 Budweiser UK Open was the third year of the darts tournament organised by the Professional Darts Corporation. 170 players took part in the competition, which was held at the Reebok Stadium, Bolton, between 10 and 12 June 2005.

Phil Taylor eventually took the trophy with a 13–7 final victory over Mark Walsh.

The tournament also featured Phil Taylor's third televised nine-dart finish in his semi-final victory over defending champion Roland Scholten.

== 2004/2005 UK Open Regional Finals ==
26 September 2004 (Welsh) Phil Taylor 2–0 Tom Wilson
17 October 2004 (Irish) Phil Taylor beat Mark Walsh
12 November 2004 (Scottish) Andy Smith 2–1 Gary Anderson
19 January 2005 (North East) Steve Hine 2–0 Bob Anderson
6 February 2005 (South West) Andy Smith 2–0 Andy Jenkins
6 March 2005 (Southern) Denis Ovens 2–1 Mark Dudbridge
20 March 2005 (North West) Alex Roy 2–1 Ronnie Baxter
10 April 2005 (Midlands) Jimmy Mann 2–0 Mark Walsh

== Prize money ==
The prize fund was £124,000.

Stage (no. of players)		Prize money (Total: £124,000)
Winner	(1)	£30,000
Runner-Up	(1)	£15,000
Semi-finalists	(2)	£7,500
Quarter-finalists	(4)	£4,000
Last 16 (fifth round)	(8)	£2,000
Last 32 (fourth round)	(16)	£1,000
Last 64 (third round)	(32)	£500
Nine-dart finish	(1)	501 bottles of Budweiser

== Friday 10 June ==
=== Preliminary round, best of 7 legs ===
Player	Score	Player
(England) James Barton	0—4	(Wales) Steve Alker
(England) John Lowe	4—2	(Scotland) Jimmy Pryde
(England) Mike Smith	2—4	(England) Mark Tiller
(Netherlands) Marcus Knapman	3—4	(England) Alan Tabern
(Wales) Wayne Atwood	4—1	(England) Clive Barden
(England) Gary Ellis	4—2	(Wales) Robert Heard
(England) Mel Porter	0—4	(England) Andy Boulton
(England) John Quantock	3–4	(Jamaica) Al Hedman

Player	Score	Player
(England) Arthur Griffiths	4—1	(England) Vernon Sheppard
(England) Ian Crichett	4—2	(England) Mark Davis
(England) Ian Lever	4—1	(England) Scott Lacroix
(England) Nick Doabe	3—4	(England) Mark Holyoake
(England) Geoff Harkup	1—4	(England) Eamon Lily
(England) Kevin Rudling	0—4	(England) Steve Gittins
(England) Richard Cantwell	2—4	(England) Rikki Blay
(Australia) Ian Wise	4—1	(England) Matt Sheehan

=== 1st Round, best of 7 legs ===
Player	Score	Player
(Northern Ireland) Paul Dillon	3—4	(England) Kevin Spiolek
(Scotland) Jason Clark	3—4	(England) Aaron Turner
(England) Nigel Russell	4—2	(Scotland) Steve Ritchie
(England) Ian Critchett	3—4	(Italy) Sergio Bongiovanni
(Republic of Ireland) Mick McGowan	4—0	(Scotland) Barry McLean
(Belgium) Joeri Raets	4—0	(England) Paul Everson
(Belgium) Yves Cottenje	4—2	(England) Mark Holyoake
(England) Ian Lever	4—0	(England) Steve Griffin
(England) Bob Avenell	1—4	(England) Deka Kennedy
(England) Darren Moulsey	2—4	(England) Glen Durrant
(England) Andy Boulton	4—3	(England) Roger Haines
(Jamaica) Al Hedman	0—4	(Wales) Steve Alker
(England) Gary Blades	3—4	(England) Gary Flynn
(Wales) Chris Gough	4—3	(England) David Venables
(England) Eamon Lily	0—4	(Wales) Robert Alford
(England) Gary Ellis	4—2	(England) Paul Hollis

Player	Score	Player
(England) Andrew Stevenson	3—4	(England) Glenn Moody
(England) Jamie Robinson	4—1	(Wales) Ken Thomas
(England) Ken Dobson	4—3	(England) Mark Tiller
(England) Ben Burton	1—4	(Wales) Wayne Atwood
(England) Sam Rooney	4—1	(England) John King
(England) Norman Fletcher	4—3	(England) Lee Topper
(Australia) Ian Wise	4—3	(England) Jason Gilbert
(England) Arthur Griffiths	1—4	(England) Phil Wathen
(England) Gary Noonan	4—0	(England) Leon Bartrup
(England) Darren Johnson	4—2	(England) Mark Frost
(Scotland) Stuart Pickles	4—3	(Republic of Ireland) Andy McGovern
(England) John Lowe	4—3	(Wales) Steve Evans
(England) Jimmy Dunlop	3—4	(England) Rikki Blay
(England) Gary Creamer	1—4	(Wales) Shaun Walsh
(England) Chris Hook	4—1	(England) Terry Hays
(England) Dave Honey	2—4	(England) Alan Tabern

=== 2nd Round, best of 7 legs ===
Player	Score	Player
(Wales) Richie Burnett	4—0	(England) Peter Evison
(England) Jason Roberts	2—4	(England) Keith Deller
(England) Norman Fletcher	4—2	(Australia) David Platt
(England) Gary Ellis	4—3	(England) Matt Chapman
(Wales) Kelvin Painter	0—4	(England) Graeme Stoddart
(England) Deta Hedman	4—3	(England) Aaron Turner
(England) Nigel Russell	3—4	(England) Rod Harrington
(England) John Lowe	4—3	(England) Mark Lawrence
(Wales) Andrew Davies	4—2	(England) Tony Randell
(Republic of Ireland) Mick McGowan	3—4	(England) James Wheatley
(England) Ian Lever	4—3	(Wales) Chris Gough
(Scotland) Stewart Rattray	4—0	(England) Paul Heston
(England) Chris Hook	3—4	(England) Gary Noonan
(Malta) Andy Keen	2—4	(England) Darren Johnson
(England) Kevin Spiolek	1—4	(Belgium) Joeri Raets

Player	Score	Player
(England) Tony Smith	4—2	(England) Simon Whatley
(England) Phil Wathen	4—3	(England) Alan Tabern
(England) Vic Hubbard	4—0	(Australia) Ian Wise
(England) Dave Jowett	4—2	(England) Gary Flynn
(England) Gary Dellow	4—3	(Wales) Robert Allford
(England) Ray Cornibert	4—3	(England) Glen Durrant
(England) Sam Rooney	1—4	(England) Glenn Moody
(Scotland) Peter Wright	4—3	(England) John Watson
(England) Dave Smith	4—3	(Scotland) Stuart Pickles
(Italy) Sergio Bongiovanni	3—4	(England) Andy Boulton
(England) Robbie Widdows	3—4	(Wales) Wayne Atwood
(Wales) Gareth Pass	2—4	(England) Ian Whillis
(England) Jamie Robinson	4—3	(England) Deka Kennedy
(Wales) Shaun Walsh	1—4	(England) Ken Dobson
(England) Rikki Blay	0—4	(Wales) Steve Alker

== Saturday 11 June ==
=== 3rd Round, best of 9 legs ===
Player	Score	Player
(Republic of Ireland) Tom Kirby	2—5	(England) Mark Landers
(England) Cliff Lazarenko	5—1	(England) Adrian Gray
(England) Alan Warriner	0—5	(Canada) John Part
(England) Wes Newton	4—5	(England) Andy Hamilton
(England) Dennis Smith	5—4	(England) Kevin Pearson
(England) Eddie Lovely	4—5	(England) Steve Coote
(Wales) Barrie Bates	5—1	(Scotland) Jamie Harvey
(England) Gary Welding	5—3	(England) Steve Beaton
(England) Andy Hayfield	5—3	(England) Steve Maish
(Wales) Steve Alker	5—4	(England) Ken Dobson
(Wales) Wayne Atwood	5—2	(England) Ray Cornibert
(Belgium) Yves Cottenje	5—2	(Wales) Sean Palfrey
(England) Mark Robinson	5—4	(England) James Wheatley
(England) Graeme Stoddart	3—5	(England) Paul Williams
(Belgium) Joeri Raets	5—2	(England) Gary Noonan
(Scotland) Stewart Rattray	5—2	(England) Gary Dellow

Player	Score	Player
(England) Andy Nye	4—5	(England) Kevin Dowling
(Wales) Andrew Davies	5—2	(England) Gary Ellis
(England) Bob Crawley	5—2	(England) Rod Harrington
(England) Deta Hedman	5—3	(England) Norman Fletcher
(England) Keith Deller	0—5	(Wales) Richie Burnett
(England) Glenn Moody	0—5	(England) Lionel Sams
(England) Dennis Priestley	5—1	(England) Phil Wathen
(England) Vic Hubbard	5—2	(England) Ian Lever
(England) Dave Jowett	4—5	(England) Darren Webster
(England) Andy Belton	5—4	(England) Andy Callaby
(England) Colin Osborne	5—1	(England) Andy Boulton
(England) Dave Smith	5—4	(Scotland) Peter Wright
(England) Jamie Robinson	2—5	(England) Ian Whillis
(England) Peter Allen	5—3	(England) Darren Williams
(England) Steve Johnson	0—5	(England) John Lowe
(England) Tony Smith	4—5	(England) Darren Johnson

=== 4th Round, best of 15 legs ===
Player	Score	Player
(England) Michael Barnard	7—8	(Netherlands) Roland Scholten
(England) Colin Lloyd	8—2	(England) Andy Hayfield
(England) Ronnie Baxter	6—8	(England) Phil Taylor
(England) Wayne Mardle	6—8	(England) James Wade
(England) Mark Dudbridge	5—8	(England) Mark Walsh
(England) Andy Jenkins	6—8	(England) Bob Anderson
(England) Peter Manley	8—3	(England) Steve Coote
(Wales) Steve Alker	8—6	(England) Kevin Painter
(England) Bob Crawley	6—8	(England) Steve Hine
(England) Darren Webster	8—7	(England) Matt Clark
(England) Denis Ovens	6—8	(England) Alex Roy
(England) Jimmy Mann	6—8	(England) Mark Landers
(England) Mick Manning	8—6	(England) Kevin Dowling
(England) Tom Wilson	6—8	(England) Gary Welding
(Wales) Wayne Atwood	8—1	(England) Deta Hedman
(England) Colin Osborne	8—5	(Belgium) Yves Cottenge

Player	Score	Player
(England) Andy Smith	8—5	(England) Wayne Jones
(Wales) Andrew Davies	0—8	(England) Mark Holden
(England) Dave Smith	5—8	(England) Cliff Lazarenko
(England) Chris Mason	8—1	(England) Paul Williams
(England) Alan Caves	5—8	(England) Colin Monk
(Scotland) Stewart Rattray	6—8	(Belgium) Erik Clarys
(Canada) John Part	8—5	(England) Dennis Priestley
(England) Darren Johnson	5—8	(England) John Lowe
(England) Andy Belton	8—4	(England) Peter Allen
(England) Ian Whilis	5—8	(Wales) Alan Reynolds
(England) Lionel Sams	8—5	(England) Dennis Smith
(Wales) Richie Burnett	0—8	(England) Mark Thomson
(England) Terry Jenkins	5—8	(England) Dave Askew
(Wales) Barrie Bates	8—3	(Belgium) Joeri Raets
(England) Adrian Lewis	8—2	(England) Vic Hubbard
(England) Mark Robinson	4—8	(England) Andy Hamilton

=== Last 32 to final ===
5th round (best of 21 legs); 11 June
(England) Phil Taylor	11
(Wales) Steve Alker	1
(England) Mark Landers	3
(Canada) John Part	11
(England) Chris Mason	11
(England) Colin Lloyd	7
(England) Adrian Lewis	11
(England) Colin Monk	0
(Netherlands) Roland Scholten	11
(England) Andy Smith	6
(England) Andy Belton	4
(England) John Lowe	11
(England) Colin Osborne	11
(England) Mick Manning	10
(England) Lionel Sams	11
(Wales) Barrie Bates	10
(England) Mark Walsh	11
(England) Andy Hamilton	4
(England) Mark Thomson	11
(England) Gary Welding	6
(Belgium) Erik Clarys	11
(Wales) Wayne Atwood	6
(England) Mark Holden	11
(England) Steve Hine	9
(England) Peter Manley	11
(Wales) Alan Reynolds	3
(England) James Wade	11
(England) Bob Anderson	9
(England) Alex Roy	11
(England) Cliff Lazarenko	5
(England) Dave Askew	11
(England) Darren Webster	8

6th round (best of 21 legs); 12 June
(England) Phil Taylor	11
(Canada) John Part	10
(England) Chris Mason	11
(England) Adrian Lewis	8
(Netherlands) Roland Scholten	11
(England) John Lowe	10
(England) Colin Osborne	11
(England) Lionel Sams	6
(England) Mark Walsh	11
(England) Mark Thomson	10
(Belgium) Erik Clarys	11
(England) Mark Holden	6
(England) Peter Manley	11
(England) James Wade	4
(England) Alex Roy	11
(England) Dave Askew	3

Quarter-finals (best of 21 legs); 12 June
(England) Phil Taylor	11
(England) Chris Mason	3
(Netherlands) Roland Scholten	11
(England) Colin Osborne	4
(England) Mark Walsh	11
(Belgium) Erik Clarys	2
(England) Peter Manley	11
(England) Alex Roy	5

Semi-finals (best of 21 legs); 12 June
(England) Phil Taylor (100.62)	11
(Netherlands) Roland Scholten (91.59)	6
(England) Mark Walsh (79.92)	11
(England) Peter Manley (85.02)	7

Final (best of 25 legs); 12 June
(England) Phil Taylor (97.80)	13
(England) Mark Walsh (89.52)	7

Random draws were made after each round, draw bracket has been compiled retrospectively.
