= Ritchie Buckle =

English darts player

Personal information
- Full name: Richard Buckle
- Nickname: Uncle Fester
- Born: 28/02/60 Dover, Kent, England
- Died: 18 August 2026 Ashford
- Home town: Dover, Kent, England

Sport
- Sport: Darts
- Playing since: 1987
- Darts: 23gram
- Laterality: Right-handed
- Walk-on music: Addams family theme song

Organisation (see split in darts)
- PDC: 2002–2009

PDC premier events – best performances
- World Championship: Last 32: 2004
- World Grand Prix: Last 16: 2002
- UK Open: Last 96: 2004

Other tournament wins
- Years
Dover Invitation Dart League Singles	2009

Richard "Ritchie" Buckle (born 28th of February 1960 from Dover, Kent) was a former English professional darts player, who played in Professional Darts Corporation events. He was nicknamed Uncle Fester.

== Career ==
Buckle qualified for the 2004 PDC World Darts Championship, who defeating at the Last 48 to Jan van der Rassel of Netherlands and Steve Brown of United States in the Last 40, but he lost at the Last 32 stage to Dennis Priestley of England.

Buckle quit the PDC in 2009.

== World Championship performances ==
=== PDC ===
- 2004: Last 32: (lost to Dennis Priestley 3–4) (sets)
