= Colin McGarry =

Northern Irish darts player (born 1965)

Personal information
- Full name: Colin Edward McGarry
- Nickname: "The Chief"
- Born: 22 July 1965 (age 61) Larne, County Antrim, Northern Ireland

Sport
- Sport: Darts
- Playing since: 1985
- Darts: 24g Unicorn
- Laterality: Right-handed
- Walk-on music: "Crazy Horses" by The Osmonds

Organisation (see split in darts)
- BDO: 2014–2016
- PDC: 2003–2014
- WSDT: 2021–2025

WDF major events – best performances
- World Masters: Last 128: 2016

PDC premier events – best performances
- World Championship: Last 32: 2004
- Grand Slam: Group Stage: 2008

WSDT major events – best performances
- World Championship: Runner-up: 2024
- World Matchplay: Quarter-final: 2022
- World Masters: Last 16: 2023

Other tournament wins
- Tournament: Years
- Northern Ireland Open Tom Kirby Memorial Trophy: 2015; 2013

Colin Edward McGarry (born 22 July 1965) is a Northern Irish former professional darts player who competed in Professional Darts Corporation (PDC) and World Seniors Darts (WSD) tournaments. He was nicknamed the Chief.

== Career ==
McGarry qualified for the 2004 PDC World Darts Championship where he beat Rory Orvis 3-0 and Mark Holden 3–0 to reach the third round, losing 4–0 to Phil Taylor. Despite his good showing in Purfleet, McGarry failed to qualify for the 2006 World Matchplay and the 2006 and 2007 World Championship.

McGarry caused a surprise in the Grand Slam of Darts Wildcard Qualifier where he reached the final, beating Mark Dudbridge and Jamie Caven along the way, but lost in the final to Wes Newton. The result meant McGarry took one of the reserved spots for the event and eventually earned qualification. He was drawn into Group C with Mervyn King, Michael van Gerwen and BDO World Champion Mark Webster. McGarry recorded a win over Webster in a final-leg decider in his opening group game. However, defeats to King and van Gerwen meant that the Ulsterman would be eliminated in the group stages.

McGarry qualified for the 2014 PDC World Darts Championship by winning the 2013 Irish Matchplay, defeating Connie Finnan six legs to four. He lost to Per Laursen 4–2 in the preliminary round.

== World Championship results ==
=== PDC ===
- 2004: Third round (lost to Phil Taylor 0–4) (sets)
- 2006: Preliminary round (lost to Yasuhiko Matsunaga 3–5) (legs)
- 2007: Preliminary round (lost to Gerry Convery 3–5)
- 2014: Preliminary round (lost to Per Laursen 2–4)

=== WSDT ===
- 2023: First round (lost to Phil Taylor 2–3)
- 2024: Runner-up (lost to John Henderson 0–5)
- 2025: First round (lost to Steve Beaton 2–3)
