= Steve Smith (darts player) =

English darts player

Personal information
- Full name: Steven Smith
- Nickname: "Smudger"
- Born: 16 May 1979 (age 47) Maidstone, Kent, England
- Home town: Maidstone, Kent, England

Sport
- Sport: Darts
- Playing since: 1996
- Darts: 22g Signature
- Laterality: Right-handed
- Walk-on music: "Everything Is Average Nowadays" by Kaiser Chiefs

Organisation (see split in darts)
- PDC: 2003–2019

PDC premier events – best performances
- World Championship: Last 40: 2004
- UK Open: Last 32: 2007, 2008
- Desert Classic: Last 16: 2006

Other tournament wins
- Years
WDF Europe Cup Youth Boys Overall	1997
WDF Europe Cup Youth Boys Pairs	1997
WDF Europe Cup Youth Boys Teams	1997
Torremolinos Open	2022

Steven "Steve" Smith (born 16 May 1979) is an English former professional darts player who played in Professional Darts Corporation (PDC) events. He has the nickname Smudger.

== Career ==
Smith played in the 2004 PDC World Darts Championship, beating Norman Madhoo of Guyana in the last 48 to reach the last 40 stage, where he lost 3–0 to Mark Dudbridge of England.

Smith's best performance in a PDC major was arguably his last 16 performance in the 2006 Desert Classic, where he lost 3–0 in sets to Raymond van Barneveld.

Smith played in his second world championship in the 2007 PDC World Darts Championship, where he lost 3–0 to Denis Ovens of England in the last 64 stage.

== Playing style ==
Smith was a consistent scorer and finisher who was aggressive on high checkouts. His stance incorporated a prominent lean and he threw at a steady pace.

== World Championship results ==
=== PDC ===
- 2004: Last 40: (lost to Mark Dudbridge 0–3)
- 2007: Last 64: (lost to Denis Ovens 0–3)
