= Rory Orvis =

Canadian darts player

Personal information
- Born: 1975 or 1976 (age 50–51) Winnipeg, Manitoba, Canada
- Home town: Winnipeg, Manitoba, Canada

Sport
- Sport: Darts
- Playing since: 1989
- Darts: 21g Winmau
- Laterality: Right-handed
- Walk-on music: "Back in Black" by AC/DC

Organisation (see split in darts)
- BDO: 1998–2003
- PDC: 2003–2023

WDF major events – best performances
- World Masters: Last 128: 2003, 2015

PDC premier events – best performances
- World Championship: Last 48: 2004
- US Open/WSoD: Last 256: 2008

Other tournament wins
- Years
| Canada National Championships | 2003 |
| Bob Jones Memorial | 2003 |
| Canadian Open | 2015 |

Rory Orvis (born 22 February 1975) is a Canadian former professional darts player who has played in the Professional Darts Corporation (PDC) events.

== Darts career ==
Orvis played in the 2004 PDC World Darts Championship, but he lost in the last 48 to Colin McGarry of Northern Ireland by 3 sets to 0.

== World Championship results ==
=== PDC ===
- 2004: Last 48: (lost to Colin McGarry 0–3) (sets)
