= Wayne Jones (darts player) =

English darts player (born 1965)

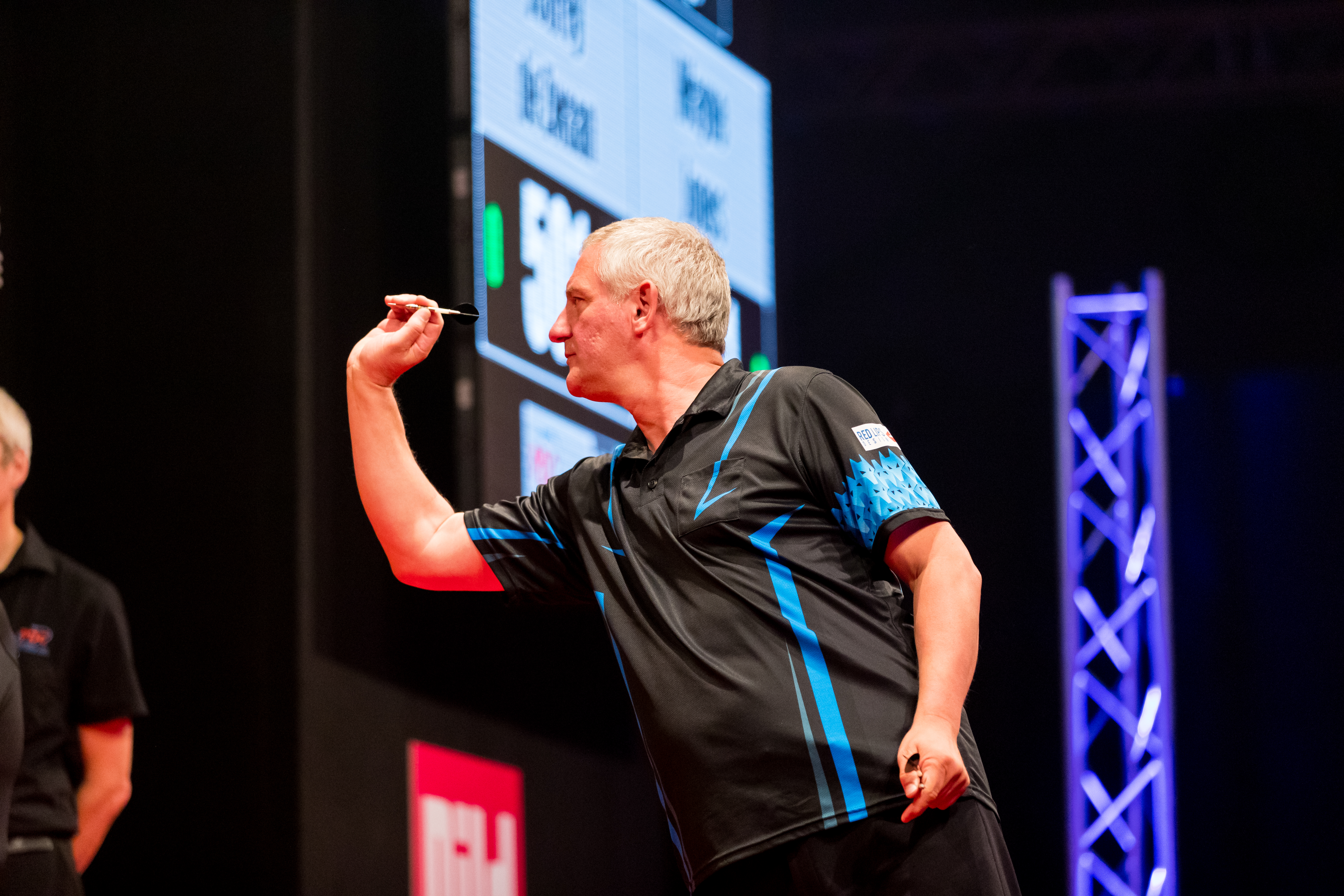

Personal information
- Nickname: "The Wanderer"
- Born: 24 April 1965 (age 61) Wolverhampton, England

Sport
- Sport: Darts
- Playing since: 1983
- Darts: 21g Target
- Laterality: Right-handed
- Walk-on music: "Enter Sandman" by Metallica

Organisation (see split in darts)
- BDO: 1988–2002
- PDC: 2002– (Tour Card: 2011–2016; 2018–2021)

WDF major events – best performances
- World Championship: Quarter-final: 2002
- World Masters: Runner-up: 1999
- World Trophy: Quarter-final: 2002
- Int. Darts League: Preliminary Round Group Stage: 2007

PDC premier events – best performances
- World Championship: Semi-final: 2006
- World Matchplay: Quarter-final: 2010
- World Grand Prix: Quarter-final: 2010
- UK Open: Quarter-final: 2003, 2008
- Grand Slam: Semi-final: 2010
- European Championship: Runner-up: 2010
- US Open/WSoD: Last 16: 2007
- PC Finals: Quarter-final: 2010
- World Series Finals: Last 24: 2019

WSDT major events – best performances
- World Masters: Last 16: 2022

Other tournament wins
- Years
Border Classic	2008
Midlands Open	2009, 2010
PDC Challenge Tour	2017 (x3)
Modus Super Series Weekly Winner	2024

Wayne Alan Jones (born 24 April 1965) is an English professional darts player who competes in Professional Darts Corporation (PDC) events. Nicknamed "The Wanderer", he reached the semi-finals of the 2006 PDC World Darts Championship and the 2010 Grand Slam of Darts, and was runner-up at the 1999 World Masters and the 2010 European Championship. He has also won four PDC Challenge Tour titles.

== Career ==
=== BDO career ===
Jones began his darts career in the British Darts Organisation (BDO) in the late 1980s. He reached the final of the British Open in 1990, losing to Alan Warriner-Little. His greatest achievement in the organisation came at the 1999 World Masters, where he finished runner-up after losing 3–1 in sets to Andy Fordham.

Jones made his BDO World Darts Championship debut in 2001, defeating Bob Taylor before losing 3–0 to Fordham in the second round. At the 2002 championship, he defeated Tony Eccles and defending champion Ted Hankey to reach the quarter-finals, where he lost 5–1 to Martin Adams. He also reached the quarter-finals of the 2002 World Darts Trophy before switching to the PDC later that year.

=== PDC career ===
==== 2002–2009: Early PDC career and World Championship semi-final ====
Following his move to the PDC in 2002, Jones reached the quarter-finals of the 2003 UK Open. He made his PDC World Darts Championship debut at the 2005 championship, advancing to the second round before losing 4–2 to Kevin Painter.

At the 2006 PDC World Darts Championship, Jones achieved his best World Championship performance, reaching the semi-finals before suffering a 6–0 defeat to Peter Manley. He subsequently established himself as a regular participant in major PDC tournaments, including the World Matchplay, World Grand Prix and European Championship. In 2008, he reached the quarter-finals of the UK Open for the second time.

==== 2010–2013: European Championship final and European Tour success ====
The 2010 season was the most successful of Jones's PDC career. He reached the quarter-finals of the 2010 World Matchplay, World Grand Prix and 2010 Players Championship Finals. He also reached his first televised PDC major final at the European Championship, defeating Raymond van Barneveld 10–8 in the quarter-finals and Colin Lloyd 11–10 in the semi-finals before losing 11–1 to Phil Taylor.

His European Championship performance secured qualification for the 2010 Grand Slam of Darts in his hometown of Wolverhampton. Jones advanced from the group stage and defeated Robert Thornton 10–6 in the second round. In the quarter-finals, he recovered from a 15–13 deficit against Gary Anderson, winning the final three legs to claim a 16–15 victory. His run ended in the semi-finals with a 16–6 defeat to James Wade.

At the 2012 PDC World Darts Championship, Jones reached the third round after victories over Scott MacKenzie and Roland Scholten. He was then defeated 4–0 by defending champion Adrian Lewis.

In October 2012, Jones reached the semi-finals of the Dutch Darts Masters. He defeated Phil Taylor 6–5 in the quarter-finals, recording a three-dart average of 101.49, before losing 6–3 to Paul Nicholson. He subsequently qualified for the 2012 Players Championship Finals, where he whitewashed top seed Dave Chisnall 6–0 in the opening round before losing 10–7 to Peter Wright.

Jones began 2013 with a first-round defeat to Jerry Hendriks at the 2013 PDC World Darts Championship. He reached the semi-finals of the eighth Players Championship event in September, losing 6–1 to Ian White. Later that month, he recorded another European Tour semi-final at the German Darts Masters. His run included victories over Michael van Gerwen (6–5), Gary Anderson (6–4) and Mareno Michels (6–0), before he lost 6–4 to Mervyn King.

Jones also qualified for the World Grand Prix, where he defeated King 2–0 in the opening round before losing 3–1 to Chisnall. At the 2013 Players Championship Finals, he lost a deciding leg to Brendan Dolan, who completed a 126 checkout to secure a 6–5 victory.

==== 2014–2017: Decline and Challenge Tour success ====
Jones suffered a first-round defeat to Kevin McDine at the 2014 PDC World Darts Championship, losing 3–2 after missing 26 darts at doubles. The result saw him drop outside the top 32 of the PDC Order of Merit. His only other appearance at a major tournament later that year came at the 2014 World Matchplay, where he lost 10–3 to Andy Hamilton in the first round.

At the 2015 PDC World Darts Championship, Jones led Dean Winstanley 2–1 in sets but eventually lost 3–2, marking his third consecutive first-round exit at the tournament. He also qualified for the 2015 Grand Slam of Darts, although he was eliminated in the group stage after defeats to Michael Smith, Andy Fordham and Adrian Lewis.

Jones failed to qualify for the 2016 PDC World Darts Championship, ending a run of eleven consecutive appearances between 2005 and 2015. He had dropped outside the automatic qualification places and was eliminated in the quarter-finals of the final qualifying event. During the 2016 season, he reached the quarter-finals of the seventh Players Championship event, defeating Ross Smith, Simon Whitlock, Vincent van der Voort and Ian White before losing 6–2 to Dave Chisnall. However, he finished the year outside the top 64 of the PDC Order of Merit and lost his Tour Card.

Jones failed to regain his Tour Card at the 2017 PDC Qualifying School and subsequently competed on the PDC Challenge Tour. He enjoyed a successful campaign, winning three tournaments – Events 6, 8 and 19 – and finishing top of the Challenge Tour Order of Merit with £10,300 in prize money. This earned him a two-year Tour Card for the 2018 and 2019 seasons.

==== 2018–2021: Return to the professional circuit ====
Jones returned to the professional circuit in 2018 and qualified for the 2019 PDC World Darts Championship through the Pro Tour Order of Merit, making his first appearance at the tournament since 2015. He faced Devon Petersen in the first round and recovered from a 2–0 deficit in sets to level the match, but missed six match darts before losing 3–2.

In 2019, Jones reached the final day of the 2019 European Darts Matchplay and qualified for the 2019 World Series of Darts Finals, where he lost to Jonny Clayton in the opening round. After dropping off the professional circuit at the end of the season, he regained his Tour Card through the 2020 PDC Qualifying School Order of Merit.

Despite a season disrupted by the COVID-19 pandemic, Jones qualified for the 2020 Players Championship Finals. He defeated Glen Durrant 6–3 in the first round with a three-dart average of 100.13, before losing 6–4 to Jeffrey de Zwaan in the second round.

Jones also qualified for the 2021 PDC World Darts Championship, where he defeated Ciarán Teehan in the first round before losing 3–0 to Joe Cullen in the second round. On 16 March 2021, he achieved a nine-dart finish during a Players Championship match against Gerwyn Price. Jones completed the perfect leg with two maximum scores and a 141 checkout, although he lost the match 6–1.

After failing to qualify for the 2022 PDC World Darts Championship, Jones lost his Tour Card again at the end of the 2021 season.

==== 2022–present: Challenge Tour, senior darts and MODUS Super Series ====
Jones was unsuccessful at the 2022 PDC Qualifying School but continued competing in PDC events. In February 2022, he qualified for the 2022 International Darts Open on the PDC European Tour, losing 6–4 to Madars Razma in the first round.

Having become eligible for senior darts events, Jones qualified for the 2022 World Seniors Darts Masters at Lakeside. He defeated Roland Scholten 4–1 in the preliminary round before losing 4–2 to Martin Adams in the last 16.

On 5 May 2023, Jones won Event 11 of the 2023 PDC Challenge Tour in Milton Keynes. He defeated Cameron Crabtree 5–1 in the semi-finals and Daniel Ayres 5–2 in the final, securing his fourth career Challenge Tour title and his first since 2017.

Jones also began competing in the MODUS Super Series. In August 2023, he reached the final of the opening week of Series Five, defeating Jamie Kelling 4–1 in the semi-finals before losing 4–2 to Matt Clark.

On 20 January 2024, Jones won Week Nine of the MODUS Super Series, defeating Mark Dudbridge 4–2 in the semi-finals and Mareno Michels 4–1 in the final. The victory secured him a place in Champions Week.

Jones continued to compete on the PDC Challenge Tour in subsequent seasons, including in 2026.

== World Championship performances ==
=== BDO ===
- 2001: Second round (lost to Andy Fordham 0–3)
- 2002: Quarter-finals (lost to Martin Adams 1–5)

=== PDC ===
- 2005: Second round (lost to Kevin Painter 2–4)
- 2006: Semi-finals (lost to Peter Manley 0–6)
- 2007: Second round (lost to Adrian Lewis 3–4)
- 2008: First round (lost to Tony Eccles 0–3)
- 2009: First round (lost to Robert Thornton 1–3)
- 2010: Second round (lost to Simon Whitlock 0–4)
- 2011: Second round (lost to Vincent van der Voort 2–4)
- 2012: Third round (lost to Adrian Lewis 0–4)
- 2013: First round (lost to Jerry Hendriks 0–3)
- 2014: First round (lost to Kevin McDine 2–3)
- 2015: First round (lost to Dean Winstanley 2–3)
- 2019: First round (lost to Devon Petersen 2–3)
- 2021: Second round (lost to Joe Cullen 0–3)

== Career finals ==
=== Major finals: 2 ===
Outcome	No.	Year	Championship	Opponent in the final	Score (Note: (l) = score in legs, (s) = score in sets.)
Runner-up	1.	1999	World Masters	(England) Andy Fordham	1–3 (s)
Runner-up	2.	2010	European Championship	(England) Phil Taylor	1–11 (l)

== Performance timeline ==
=== BDO ===
Tournament	1987	1999	2000	2001	2002
BDO Ranked televised events
World Championship	DNQ			2R	QF
World Masters	4R	F	2R	3R	DNP
British Professional	QF	Not held			
World Darts Trophy	Not held				QF

=== WSDT ===
Tournament	2022
WSDT Non-ranked televised events
World Seniors Masters	1R

=== PDC ===
Tournament	2002	2003	2004	2005	2006	2007	2008	2009	2010	2011		2012	2013	2014	2015	2016	2017	2018	2019	2020	2021	2022
PDC Ranked televised events
World Championship	Did not participate			3R	SF	2R	1R	1R	2R	2R		3R	1R	1R	1R	Did not qualify			1R	DNQ	2R	DNQ
UK Open	NH	QF	3R	4R	4R	6R	QF	4R	5R	3R		2R	2R	2R	2R	2R	3R	2R	2R	2R	2R	DNP
World Matchplay	DNP					1R	1R	1R	QF	2R		DNQ		1R	Did not qualify							
World Grand Prix	1R	Did not qualify				1R	1R	2R	QF	1R		DNQ	2R	Did not qualify								
European Championship	Not held						1R	1R	F	1R		Did not qualify										
Grand Slam	Not held					RR	DNQ		SF	2R		RR	DNQ		RR	Did not qualify						
Players Championship Finals	Not held							2R	QF	1R	2R	2R	1R	Did not qualify						2R	DNQ	DNP
PDC Non-ranked televised events
World Series Finals	Not held														Did not qualify				1R	DNQ		DNP
Career statistics
Year-end ranking	Not ranked				28	23	25	23	13	14		30	31	37	44	63	103	93	78	80	80	213

==== PDC European Tour ====
Season	1	2	3	4	5	6	7	8	9	10	11	12	13
2012	ADO; 1R	GDC; 2R	EDO; 1R	GDM; 3R	DDM; SF								
2013	UKM; 2R	DNQ	EDO; 2R	ADO; 2R	GDT; 1R	DNQ	GDM; SF	DDM; 2R					
2014	GDC; 3R	DDM; 1R	Did not qualify				EDG; 1R	DNQ					
2015	DNQ	GDT; 3R	DNQ	DDM; 1R	Did not qualify								
2016	DNQ		GDT; 1R	DNQ	ADO; 1R	Did not qualify							
2017	Did not qualify						ADO; 1R	Did not qualify					
2018	EDO; 1R	DNQ		ADO; 3R	DNQ	DDM; 2R	DNQ	DDO; 1R	DNQ		DDC; 2R	DNQ	
2019	EDO; 1R	DNQ		GDO; 1R	Did not qualify						EDM; 3R	DNQ	
2020	Did not qualify												
2021	DNQ	GDT; 1R											
2022	IDO; 1R	Did not qualify											

==== PDC Players Championships ====
Season	1	2	3	4	5	6	7	8	9	10	11	12	13	14	15	16	17	18	19	20	21	22	23	24	25	26	27	28	29	30	31	32	33	34	35	36	37
2003	BLA; 1R																																				
2004	DNP	NEW; QF	DUB; 1R	DNP																																	
2005	IOW; 1R	DNP		NEW; 4R	DUB; 2R	IRV; 1R	LIS; 1R	LIS; 3R																													
2006	GIB; 4R	HAY; 2R	HAY; 1R	BLA; 1R	NEW; 4R	DUB; 3R	IRV; 3R	LIS; 2R	LIS; 3R																												
2007	GIB; QF	GIB; 2R	BAD; 3R	TEM; QF	SCH; 3R	DNP	HAY; 1R	HAY; 1R	DNP	BLA; 2R	DNP	CAS; 4R	DNP	NEW; 3R	DUB; 3R	DNP		KIL; 2R	LIS; 3R	LIS; 3R																	
2008	GIB; 4R	GIB; 2R	BRE; 1R	WIG; 2R	BAD; QF	BAD; F	TEL; QF	TEM; 4R	GLA; 2R	SCH; 1R	BRI; 3R	BRI; 3R	DNP	BLA; 3R	DNP			VEL; 3R	VEL; SF	DRO; 3R	DNP	NEW; 2R	NEW; 1R	DUB; 3R	DUB; 3R	IRV; QF	IRV; 1R	DNP		LEI; 1R	LEI; 3R						
2009	DON; 2R	GIB; 4R	GIB; 4R	GLA; 4R	GLA; 3R	IRV; QF	WIG; SF	BRE; 3R	COV; QF	NUL; 4R	NUL; 3R	TAU; 3R	DER; QF	NEW; SF	BAR; 3R	BAR; 4R	DIN; SF	DIN; 1R	Did not participate				ATL; QF	SAL; QF	SAL; QF	DUB; 2R	DUB; SF	KIL; 3R	NUL; 3R	NUL; 3R	IRV; 4R	DNP					
2010	GIB; F	GIB; 4R	SWI; QF	DER; 3R	GLA; F	GLA; 1R	WIG; 2R	CRA; 3R	BAR; QF	DER; QF	WIG; 3R	WIG; 2R	SAL; QF	SAL; 4R	BAR; QF	BAR; 1R	HAA; F	HAA; 4R	Did not participate						CRA; 4R	CRA; 2R	NUL; 1R	NUL; 1R	DUB; 2R	DUB; 4R	DNP	BAD; 3R	BAD; 4R	BAR; 2R	BAR; 4R	DER; 3R	DER; 3R
2011	HAL; 2R	HAL; 2R	DER; 1R	DER; 2R	CRA; 4R	CRA; QF	VIE; 2R	VIE; 3R	CRA; QF	CRA; 1R	BAR; 3R	BAR; QF	NUL; 4R	NUL; 3R	DNP		DER; 3R	DER; 4R	NUL; 3R	NUL; 3R	DUB; 2R	DUB; 2R	KIL; 4R	GLA; 4R	GLA; 4R	ALI; 2R	ALI; 3R	CRA; 3R	CRA; 2R	WIG; 2R	WIG; 4R						
2012	ALI; 2R	ALI; 2R	REA; 3R	REA; 1R	CRA; 2R	CRA; 1R	BIR; 3R	BIR; 1R	CRA; 1R	CRA; 1R	BAR; 3R	BAR; 4R	DUB; 1R	DUB; 3R	KIL; 1R	KIL; 1R	CRA; 3R	CRA; 3R	BAR; 3R	BAR; 3R																	
2013	WIG; 1R	WIG; 4R	WIG; 1R	WIG; 1R	CRA; 2R	CRA; 1R	BAR; 4R	BAR; SF	DUB; 4R	DUB; 4R	KIL; 2R	KIL; 3R	WIG; 2R	WIG; 2R	BAR; 1R	BAR; 2R																					
2014	BAR; 3R	BAR; 4R	CRA; 2R	CRA; 3R	WIG; 4R	WIG; 3R	WIG; 1R	WIG; 3R	CRA; 2R	CRA; 2R	COV; 3R	COV; 1R	CRA; 4R	CRA; 3R	DUB; 1R	DUB; 2R	CRA; 1R	CRA; 3R	COV; 1R	COV; 1R																	
2015	BAR; 1R	BAR; 1R	BAR; 2R	BAR; 2R	BAR; 1R	COV; 2R	COV; 1R	COV; 2R	CRA; 3R	CRA; 1R	BAR; 1R	BAR; 2R	WIG; 1R	WIG; 4R	BAR; 4R	BAR; 2R	DUB; 1R	DUB; 4R	COV; 2R	COV; 2R																	
2016	BAR; 1R	BAR; 1R	BAR; 1R	BAR; 2R	BAR; 1R	BAR; 2R	BAR; QF	COV; 3R	COV; 1R	BAR; 2R	BAR; 1R	BAR; 3R	BAR; 3R	BAR; 1R	BAR; 2R	BAR; 1R	DUB; 1R	DUB; 1R	BAR; 1R	BAR; 2R																	
2017 (Note: Not a Tour card holder)	BAR; 2R	BAR; 3R	DNP		MIL; 2R	DNP		BAR; 4R	WIG; 3R	WIG; 3R	MIL; 1R	MIL; 2R	WIG; 1R	WIG; 4R	BAR; 2R	BAR; 1R	BAR; 1R	BAR; 1R	DUB; 2R	DUB; 1R	BAR; 1R	BAR; 2R															
2018	BAR; 3R	BAR; 1R	BAR; 2R	BAR; 2R	MIL; 4R	MIL; 1R	BAR; 2R	BAR; 1R	WIG; 2R	WIG; 1R	MIL; 2R	MIL; 1R	WIG; 1R	WIG; 1R	BAR; 1R	BAR; 1R	BAR; 4R	BAR; 1R	DUB; 1R	DUB; 3R	BAR; 2R	BAR; 1R															
2019	WIG; 1R	WIG; 1R	WIG; 3R	WIG; 1R	BAR; 1R	BAR; 1R	WIG; 1R	WIG; 1R	BAR; 2R	BAR; 4R	BAR; 1R	BAR; 1R	BAR; 1R	BAR; 1R	BAR; 2R	BAR; 1R	WIG; 1R	WIG; 1R	BAR; 1R	BAR; 2R	HIL; 1R	HIL; 2R	BAR; 1R	BAR; 1R	BAR; 2R	BAR; 1R	DUB; 1R	DUB; 1R	BAR; 2R	BAR; 2R							
2020	BAR; 3R	BAR; 2R	WIG; 2R	WIG; 1R	WIG; 1R	WIG; 2R	BAR; 1R	BAR; 2R	MIL; 2R	MIL; 1R	MIL; 2R	MIL; 3R	MIL; SF	NIE; 2R	NIE; 2R	NIE; 1R	NIE; 1R	NIE; 1R	COV; 1R	COV; 1R	COV; 2R	COV; 2R	COV; 2R														
2021	Did not participate				MIL; 2R	MIL; 1R	MIL; 2R	MIL; 1R	NIE; 1R	NIE; 1R	NIE; 1R	NIE; 2R	MIL; 1R	MIL; 1R	MIL; 1R	MIL; 1R	COV; 1R	COV; 1R	COV; 1R	COV; 1R	BAR; 2R	BAR; 1R	BAR; 1R	BAR; 1R	BAR; 3R	BAR; 1R	BAR; 1R	BAR; 2R	BAR; 1R	BAR; 2R							
2023	Did not participate										LEI; 1R	LEI; 1R	DNP		LEI; 2R	LEI; 1R	Did not participate																				

==== PDC Challenge Tour ====
Season	1	2	3	4	5	6	7	8	9	10	11	12	13	14	15	16	17	18	19	20	21	22	23	24	Prize money	Ranking
2017	MIL; L16	MIL; L64	MIL; L256	MIL; L16	BAR; QF	BAR; W	BAR; L64	BAR; W	MIL; QF	MIL; L32	MIL; F	MIL; L16	MIL; L64	MIL; L128	MIL; L128	MIL; QF	WIG; F	WIG; SF	WIG; W	WIG; L64					£10,300	1st
2022	MIL; L32	MIL; L128	MIL; L128	MIL; L256	MIL; L32	Did not participate										LEI; L256	LEI; L256	LEI; L16	LEI; L64	LEI; L64	LEI; L64	LEI; L128	LEI; L16	LEI; SF	£1,250	54th
2023	MIL; L256	MIL; L256	MIL; L128	MIL; L256	MIL; QF	Did not participate				MIL; L64	MIL; W	MIL; L16	MIL; L32	MIL; L128	Did not participate					WIG; L128	WIG; L128	WIG; L64	WIG; L64	WIG; L16	£3,925	22nd
2024	Did not participate										LEI; L64	LEI; L128	LEI; QF	LEI; L256	LEI; L256	Did not participate					LEI; L32	LEI; L64	LEI; L16	LEI; L64	£1,225	82nd
2026	MIL; L256	MIL; L256	MIL; L256	MIL; L64	DNP	LEI; L256	LEI; L256	LEI; L64	LEI; L128	LEI; L256	Did not participate										WIG; L64	WIG; L16	WIG; L128	DNP	£900	131st

Performance Table Legend
W	Won the tournament	F	Finalist	SF	Semifinalist	QF	Quarterfinalist	#R; RR; Prel.	Lost in # round Round-robin; Preliminary round	DQ	Disqualified
DNQ	Did not qualify	DNP	Did not participate	WD	Withdrew	NH	Tournament not held	#R; RR; Prel.	Lost in # round Round-robin; Preliminary round	NYF	Not yet founded
