= Lionel Sams =

English darts player

Personal information
- Full name: Lionel Jeffrey Sams
- Nickname: "The Lion"
- Born: 20 January 1961 (age 65) Paddington, London, England
- Home town: Letchworth, Hertfordshire, England

Sport
- Sport: Darts
- Playing since: 1986
- Darts: A180/Lionel Sams 19gm Tungsten
- Laterality: Left-handed
- Walk-on music: "Jungle Rock" by Hank Mizell

Organisation (see split in darts)
- BDO: 1986–2001, 2011–2012
- PDC: 2001–2010, 2013–2015

WDF major events – best performances
- World Masters: Last 64: 1995

PDC premier events – best performances
- World Championship: Last 16: 2004
- World Matchplay: Last 16: 2006
- World Grand Prix: Last 16: 2006
- UK Open: Last 16: 2005
- Desert Classic: Last 32: 2004, 2005
- US Open/WSoD: Last 32: 2007

Other tournament wins
- Tournament: Years
- Bury St Edmunds Open Cosham Xmas Open Hersham Open Kent Open West Tyrone Open: 2013 2001; 2003; 2008; 2007

Other achievements
- Nine dart finish Le Skratch Open, Montreal, 12 May 2002
- Updated on 11 February 2008

Lionel Jeffrey Sams (born 20 January 1961) is an English former darts player who played in events of the British Darts Organisation (BDO) and Professional Darts Corporation (PDC). His nickname was The Lion.

Sams' first televised darts match was on Anglia Television in 1986 at the Ladbrokes Festival (British Matchplay). He reached the final, but lost to Terry O'Dea. He then had some minor tournament victories including the Camber Sands Singles (1988) and Kent Open (1988 and 1989) but it was a long time before he made any impact on the darts circuit. Lional won the over 60s British Table Tennis Title in December 2024.

== Career ==
Sams' career turned for the better after joining the PDC. He hit a perfect nine-dart leg in a match against Ronnie Baxter in Montreal in May 2002 – there was no prize for the achievement, but players passed round a hat to collect $400.

During the mid-2000s, Sams was a regular in televised PDC majors. He consistently reached the last 16 of tournaments on the PDC circuit, which helped him to maintain a world ranking inside the top 32.

He was successful at the West Tyrone Open in February 2007, winning the singles and the doubles event, with Sean McGowan.

=== Decline ===
Sams' record at the World Championship has been poor since reaching the last 16 in 2004 and he lost his first match at each of the 2005, 2006 and 2007 Championships. He also failed to achieve success in the other televised tournaments, being unable to reach the quarter-final stage of any of the majors. He slipped outside the top 32 towards the end of 2007, and as a result, he inadvertently failed to enter himself for the qualifying rounds for the 2008 World Championship, missing out on the tournament for the first time since 2003. He has failed to qualify for the PDC World Championship since 2007.

During 2009, he reached two quarter finals on the PDC Pro Tour, but ended the year with only £6,100 in total prize money. He had a further decline in 2010, picking up just £600 in total prize money, as he entered fewer events and then failed to get past the last 64 stage of any Pro Tour Event. His PDC ranking fell to near 100 at the start of 2011 and he chose to decline a Pro Tour card for the year, effectively ending his PDC career. He joined the British Darts Organisation circuit in 2011.

== World Championship results ==
=== PDC ===
- 2004: 4th Round (lost to Simon Whatley 1–4) (sets)
- 2005: 3rd Round (lost to Dennis Priestley 1–4)
- 2006: 1st Round (lost to John Kuczynski 0–3)
- 2007: 1st Round (lost to Dave Ladley 1–3)
