= 2001 PDC World Darts Championship =

Tournament information
- Dates: 28 December 2000 – 3 January 2001
- Venue: Circus Tavern
- Location: Purfleet, Essex, England
- Organisation(s): Professional Darts Corporation
- Format: Sets; Final – best of 13
- Prize fund: £125,000
- Winner's share: £33,000
- High checkout: 167 Phil Taylor (ENG)

Champion(s)
- Phil Taylor (ENG)

The 2001 PDC World Darts Championship (known for sponsorship reasons as the 2001 Skol World Darts Championship) was a professional darts tournament held from 28 December 2000 and 3 January 2001 at the Circus Tavern in Purfleet, Essex, England. It was the eighth staging of the competition since the 1994 competition. The competition was the first of 34 Professional Darts Corporation (PDC) tournaments in the 2001 season. The tournament was broadcast on Sky Sports and was sponsored by Skol.

Phil Taylor, the tournament's defending champion, whitewashed the competition's first non-British finalist John Part 7–0 in the final. It was Taylor's seventh consecutive championship and his ninth overall since his first success in the 1990 BDO world championship. He defeated Nigel Justice, Les Fitton, Keith Deller and Dave Askew en route to the final. Taylor achieved the competition's highest checkout of 167 in the third set of the final against Part.

== Tournament summary ==
=== Background ===
The Professional Darts Corporation (PDC) was established under the World Darts Council name by the managers John Markovic, Tommy Cox and Dick Allix and the world's top 16 players in January 1992 as a separate body from the British Darts Organisation (BDO). The first edition of the PDC World Darts Championship was the 1994 competition; it is one of two world championships in the game of darts: the other being the BDO World Darts Championship. The 2001 tournament was held between 28 December 2000 and 3 January 2001 in Purfleet, Essex, England, and was the first of 34 PDC-sanctioned events that year. It was the eighth edition of the tournament and featured a 32-player main draw that was played at the Circus Tavern.

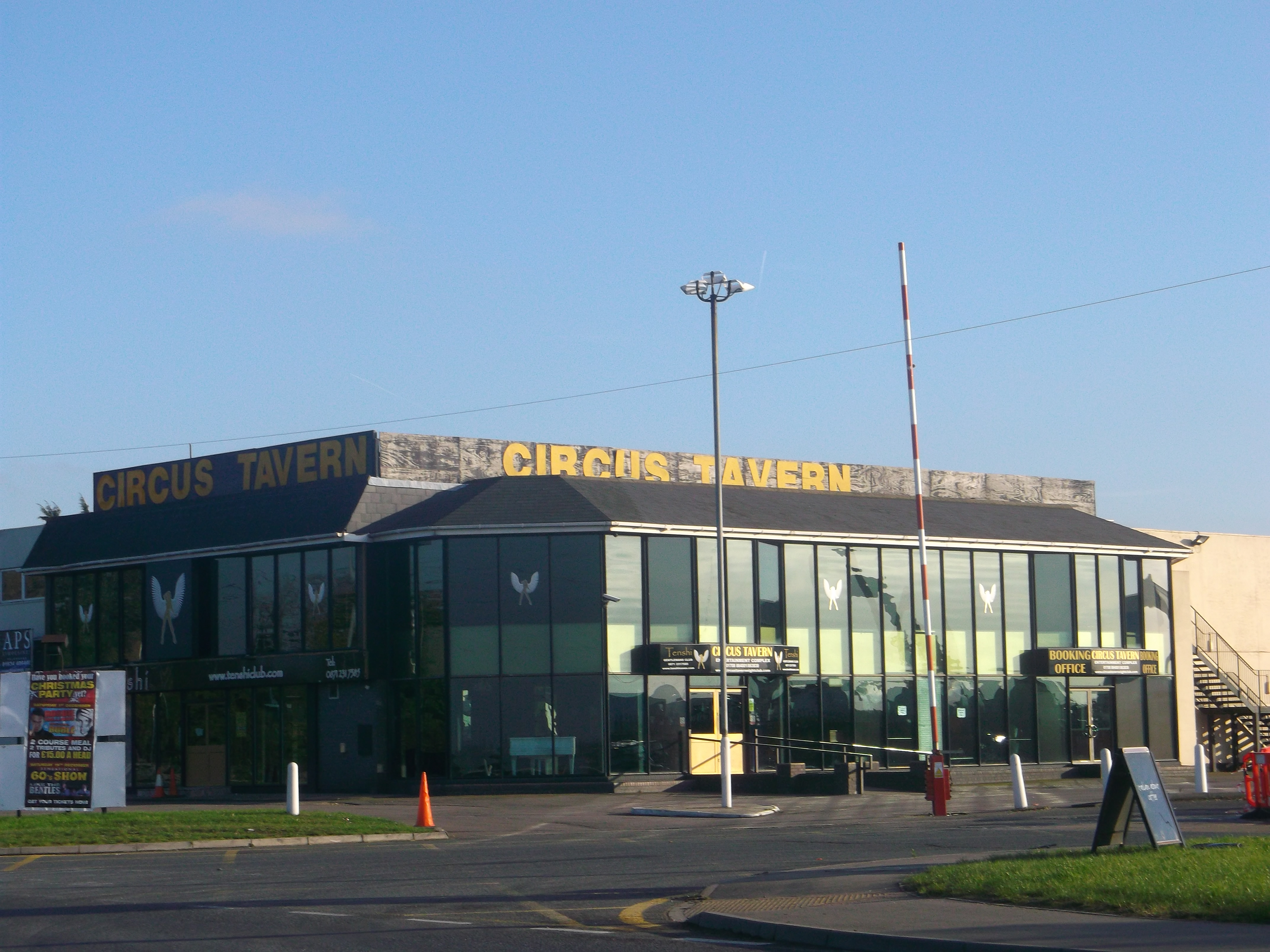
The Circus Tavern, where the tournament was held

32 players automatically qualified for the main draw with eight of them seeded. Peter Manley was seeded first and Alan Warriner was the second seed. Seven players debuted at the world championship; three were required by a tomlin order not to enter any PDC-sanctioned darts competitions for one year. They were Richie Burnett, Roland Scholten and Denis Ovens. Dave Askew, Les Fitton and Gary Spedding were the other three men to qualify for the event. Burnett was the first player from Wales to play in a PDC World Championship. The tournament featured the first woman, Gayl King, to play in a PDC world championship after the organisation invited her to take part. The maximum number of sets contested in a match increased from five in the first and second rounds to seven in the quarter-finals and eleven in the semi-finals, leading up to the final which was played as best-of-thirteen sets. Sponsored by Skol, it had a total prize fund of £125,000, and the host broadcaster was Sky Sports.

Bookmakers and the press considered the tournament's defending champion Phil Taylor the favourite to retain his title for the seventh successive year. The second favourite to claim the world championship was Shayne Burgess after he was the runner-up in the World Grand Prix two months prior. Taylor expressed confidence he could compile a nine-dart finish after having done so in an exhibition match against Warriner.

=== Round 1 ===
The draw for the first round of the championship was made on Sky Sports' website by Tommy Cox, Alex Roy and Sid Waddell on the afternoon of 7 December 2000. The first round of the competition, in which 32 players participated, took place from 28 and 29 December 2000. In this round, eighth seed Askew defeated Mick Manning 3–2. Askew had attempted a nine-dart finish before he missed the triple 19 ring in the third leg of the opening set. Ahead 2–0, Askew lost his advantage when Manning won two sets in a row. The match ended with a sudden death leg in the fifth set that Askew took with a finish of thirteen darts to requite his loss from the World Grand Prix. Askew was the first player to enter the second round.

Roy beat Steve Raw 3–2; the match saw Roy claim two successive sets until Raw won the next two to require a deciding fifth set that Roy took after five legs. The 1995 BDO world champion Burnett had a 103.4 average en route to whitewashing Steve Brown 3–0. Fitton took a 3–1 victory against Ovens. Manley, the world number one, was the highest ranked player to lose in the round when he lost 2–3 to world number 21 Jamie Harvey. His opponent won five legs for the first two sets before Manley took two sets 3–1. Harvey took the concluding set 3–1 to win. After the match Manley attributed his loss to Harvey's slow play and accuracy on hitting the double rings.

John Lowe, a former world champion, defeated Spedding 3–1 after his opponent failed to win the third and fourth sets. Fifth seed Dennis Priestley lost 3–2 against Keith Deller. The first two sets were won by Deller. Priestley won the next two to force a final set decider that Deller won 6–4 on the bullseye ring. Taylor had an average of 94.08 over Nigel Justice and had a 151 checkout in a 3–0 whitewash. Paul Lim averaged 89.49 and made checkouts of 110 and 128 to defeat Dan Lauby 3–1. World number 32 Graeme Stoddart won 3–1 over King after the latter came from two legs down to claim the first set. Stoddart complimented King on her play and the latter said she enjoyed the atmosphere. Warriner and Cliff Lazarenko whitewashed Reg Harding and Scott Cummings respectively 3–0.

Seventh seed John Part whitewashed Colin Lloyd 3–0. The 2000 tournament semi-finalist and world number eleven Dennis Smith won the first set 3–2 over the pre-match favourite Peter Evison. He took the next two sets unchallenged to win 3–0. Bob Anderson, the 1988 BDO world champion, lost 1–3 to the sixth seed and two time World Matchplay champion Rod Harrington. Anderson went two sets behind Harrington after the first seven legs. He scored highly in the third set to go 2–1 behind before Harrington compiled a 119 checkout with a finish on the double 16 ring to win 3–1. In the final first round match, Roland Scholten whitewashed Burgess 3–0 and reached the second round of a PDC tournament for the first time in two prior attempts.

=== Round 2 ===
The second round was held on 30 December 2000. Askew took a 3–2 victory over Roy, a match that saw both players compile thirteen maximum scores between them. He converted a 2–1 deficit to win the match after he took the final two sets. Askew said afterwards: "I was really pleased to battle back. Alex is a great player but I'm just pleased that I've won." Warriner defeated Lim 3–2 in a game where both players had sub-par performances; Warriner secured the opening two sets before Lim took the third and fourth sets to require the match to conclude with a fifth set due to the scores being tied at 2–2. Lim missed two opportunities to win the match and Warriner took the final set 5–3. In the match between Smith and Part, both players shared the first four sets to force a game-ending fifth set. Smith took the first leg before Part won three successive legs to win 3–2. Scholten whitewashed Lazarenko 3–0 from set victories of 3–2, 3–2 and 3–0.

Harvey averaged a 60 per cent finishing record to whitewash Lowe 3–0 and compiled a series of maximums; Lowe was unable to convert multiple opportunities provided to him and prolong the game. Deller continued his run in the competition as he edged out Burnett 3–2. Both players tied at 2–2 to force a final set decider that Deller won with a 144 checkout. Taylor lost the first set of his match against world number 26 Fitton 3–2 before he secured three consecutive sets and a 3–1 victory with an average of 32.32 points per dart. Taylor said afterwards he was concerned about being eliminated from the tournament. The final match of the second round saw Harrington whitewash Stoddart 3–0 and earn the final berth in the quarter-finals. Harrington did not lose a leg to Stoddart as he won set one. He clinched the second after a final leg decider and then completed the match in set three 3–1.

=== Quarter-finals ===
The four quarter-finals were played to the best-of-seven sets on 1 January 2001. Askew produced a three-dart average finish close to 100 and achieved three maximums to win the first set from Harvey. He then compiled a 161 checkout and three maximums as he took the next three sets to whitewash Harvey 4–0 and was the first player to reach the semi-finals. Askew said him not partaking in celebrations for the start of 2001 allowed for his victory: "Jamie could have pushed me a lot harder. He didn't play as well as he could." The second quarter-final saw Harrington beat Scholten 4–2. Harrington took the first set without losing a leg and had a 116 checkout. Scholten took the lead with victories in the following two sets. Harrington made three maximums to level the match after Scholten's dart did not land in the double 16 ring. Harrington then made a 12-dart finish in set five and won the match in the following set. He commented on his victory: "I really worked hard there. That was a good win and I'm feeling good. I could have gone in the ring with Mike Tyson and I think I would have given a good account of myself because that's how I felt. I was really pumped up."

In the third quarter-final, Part defeated Warriner 4–1. The match was tied after two sets before Part took a 2–1 advantage. In the second leg of the fifth set, Part could not complete a nine-dart finish. He then compiled a 69 checkout in thirteen dart throws. Part claimed set five 3–0 and became the third player to progress to the semi-finals. The last quarter-final saw Deller whitewashed 4–0 by Taylor and the latter increased his unbeaten televised game streak to 21. He attained a three-dart finishing average of 103.19 and took the opening leg 3–0. He missed hitting the doubles and caused the second set to conclude after five legs. Taylor achieved a 120 checkout in the third set and a finish of ten darts in the fourth set to win the match. Taylor said his performance had improved and that Deller did not play to the best of his ability: "He's a professional darts player so you've got to knock his confidence down a bit because otherwise he can get in front and his confidence goes up."

=== Semi-finals ===
Both of the semi-finals were played to the best-of-eleven sets on 2 January 2001. Taylor whitewashed Askew 6–0 with a three-dart finish average of almost 103 and compiled 14 maximums. Taylor won the first four sets and Askew commenced the fifth with a 126 checkout. Taylor then claimed six consecutive legs including an 11-dart finish to win. After the match, Taylor said he felt he could improve his throw because it was out of trajectory and that he had put pressure onto Askew from the beginning of the game. He was considered the favourite to win the title the following day and commented that wanted to claim his ninth world championship, "I want to be ten times world champion. This is the biggest chance I've got to make it nine and I can't see anybody beating me. Certainly not tomorrow."

The other semi-final was contested between Harrington and Part. Both players shared the first two sets before Part extended his lead to 3–1 after he won the fourth set. A finish of eleven darts and misses from Part allowed Harrington to take set five before Part won the following two sets. Harrington then took three more sets to require the match to conclude in a final-set decider. The first leg saw Part win with a 122 checkout before he missed the double 16 ring in the third leg. Harrington tied the set at 2–2 on the double 20 ring. This required a player to win the match in a tiebreak. Part achieved checkouts of 161 and 86 to claim a 6–5 win. This made Part the first non-British player to reach the final of the PDC world championship. Part said post-match that he "was almost crying, I really was. I knew Rod was the quality player he is and that I couldn't let him back the way I did. I think I'm really fortunate that I got out of that."

=== Final ===
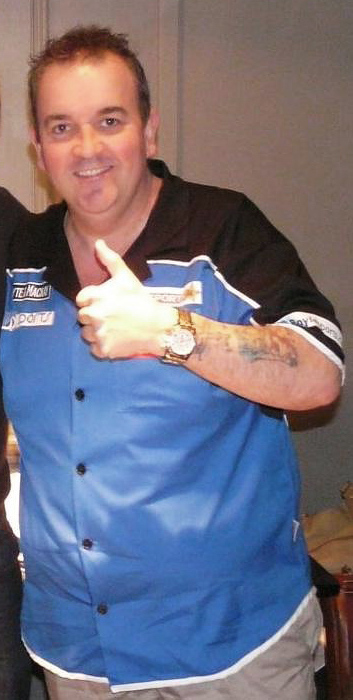
Phil Taylor (pictured in 2009) won his ninth world darts championship with a 7–0 whitewash of Part.

The final between Part and Taylor on 3 January 2001 was held to the best-of-thirteen sets. To reach the 2001 final, Taylor had defeated Nigel Justice, Les Fitton, Keith Deller and Dave Askew, while Part had beaten Colin Lloyd, Dennis Smith, Alan Warriner and Rod Harrington. This was Taylor's tenth world championship final and his eighth consecutive in the PDC. He had previously won the world championship eight times in 1990, 1992, 1995, 1996, 1997, 1998, 1999 and 2000. Part had been the BDO world champion in 1994 and appeared in his second career world final. It was the first time Taylor and Part had played each other in professional competition.

The game was attended by 1,000 people. Taylor won the first two legs and Part threw 12 darts to win the third with a 127 checkout. Taylor won the first set 3–1 with a 14-dart finish, then took the second set with a 121 checkout and stopped Part from getting a chance to hit a double ring. In set three, Taylor compiled the tournament's highest checkout, a 167, in its second leg and won the set after Part missed the bullseye ring in the first leg. He then won six successive legs to go 5–0 ahead with a finish of ten dart throws and an 82 checkout. Part took the first leg of the sixth set with a 120 checkout to stop a loss of 14 legs in a row before Taylor complied three consecutive 13-dart finishes to claim the set 3–1. The seventh set began with Part claiming one leg until Taylor completed a 7–0 whitewash by winning the set 3–1 and the tournament. It was Taylor's ninth world darts championship and his seventh in succession. He had a 72.4 per cent checkout and a three-dart average of 107.46.

Taylor earned £33,000 for winning the tournament and £1,000 for compiling the highest checkout. He commented on his win: "I must admit that I did think John would have given me more of a push but I didn't give him a chance to be fair. My finishing was superb tonight. But you can't give him a chance because otherwise you'll be runner-up." Taylor also stated his belief the result was similar to his defeat of Dennis Priestley at the 1998 tournament. Part said Taylor had defeated him meticulously. "Playing Phil is completely oppressive, take Tiger Woods and double it, He really killed me with his outshots, his doubles percentage must have been around 80 per cent, which is ridiculous. It takes away your hope when a guy never misses a double. It was a special performance, unreal, and I just couldn't measure up.", stated Part.

== Prize fund ==
The breakdown of prize money for 2001 is shown below.

- Champion: £33,000
- Runner-up: £18,000
- Semi-finalists: £8,500 (×2)
- Quarter-finalist: £4,000 (×4)
- Second-round: £2,000 (×8)
- First round: £1,500 (×16)
- 9 Dart Checkout: £100,000
- Highest checkout: £1,000
- Total: £125,000

== Draw ==
Numbers given to the left of players' names show the seedings for the top eight participants in the tournament. The figures to the right of a competitor's name state their three-dart averages in a match. Players in bold denote match winners.

**First round** (best of 5 sets); 28–29 December
1	Peter Manley (ENG) 86.31	2
**Jamie Harvey** (SCO) 86.46	**3**
**John Lowe** (ENG) 88.23	**3**
Gary Spedding (ENG) 81.85	1
8	**Dave Askew** (ENG) 93.85	**3**
Mick Manning (ENG) 87.91	2
**Alex Roy** (ENG) 85.44	**3**
Steve Raw (ENG) 86.37	2
5	Dennis Priestley (ENG) 85.77	2
**Keith Deller** (ENG) 88.13	**3**
**Richie Burnett** (WAL) 103.39	**3**
Steve Brown (USA) 85.50	0
4	**Phil Taylor** (ENG) 94.09	**3**
Nigel Justice (ENG) 78.43	0
**Les Fitton** (ENG) 89.19	**3**
Denis Ovens (ENG) 91.31	1
2	**Alan Warriner** (ENG) 87.92	**3**
Reg Harding (ENG) 80.41	0
**Paul Lim** (SIN) 89.50	**3**
Dan Lauby (USA) 80.93	1
7	**John Part** (CAN) 89.78	**3**
Colin Lloyd (ENG) 85.31	0
**Dennis Smith** (ENG) 93.22	**3**
Peter Evison (ENG) 84.67	0
6	**Rod Harrington** (ENG) 91.63	**3**
Bob Anderson (ENG) 92.28	1
**Graeme Stoddart** (ENG) 78.92	**3**
Gayl King (CAN) 69.34	1
3	Shayne Burgess (ENG) 93.89	0
**Roland Scholten** (NED) 93.09	**3**
**Cliff Lazarenko** (ENG) 87.51	**3**
Scott Cummings (CAN) 81.01	0

**Second round** (best of 5 sets); 30 December
(Scotland) **Jamie Harvey** 85.89	**3**
(England) John Lowe 85.18	0
8	(England) **Dave Askew** 88.56	**3**
(England) Alex Roy 87.54	2
(England) **Keith Deller** 91.92	**3**
(Wales) Richie Burnett 96.39	2
4	(England) **Phil Taylor** 96.95	**3**
(England) Les Fitton 96.67	1
2	(England) **Alan Warriner** 84.61	**3**
(Singapore) Paul Lim 85.73	2
7	(Canada) **John Part** 90.94	**3**
(England) Dennis Smith 88.51	2
6	(England) **Rod Harrington** 91.75	**3**
(England) Graeme Stoddart 80.43	0
(Netherlands) **Roland Scholten** 83.86	**3**
(England) Cliff Lazarenko 74.19	0

**Quarter-Finals** (best of 7 sets); 1 January
(Scotland) Jamie Harvey 80.48	0
8	(England) **Dave Askew** 96.86	**4**
(England) Keith Deller 85.57	0
4	(England) **Phil Taylor** 103.19	**4**
2	(England) Alan Warriner 87.25	1
7	(Canada) **John Part** 93.26	**4**
6	(England) **Rod Harrington** 93.51	**4**
(Netherlands) Roland Scholten 86.80	2

**Semi-finals** (best of 11 sets); 2 January
8	(England) Dave Askew 88.35	0
4	(England) **Phil Taylor** 102.75	**6**
7	(Canada) **John Part** 90.99	**6**
6	(England) Rod Harrington 95.80	5

**Final** (best of 13 sets); 3 January
4	(England) **Phil Taylor** 107.46	**7**
7	(Canada) John Part 92.60	0
