= 2002 PDC World Darts Championship =

Darts tournament

2002 Skol World Darts Championship

Tournament information
- Dates: 28 December 2001 – 5 January 2002
- Venue: Circus Tavern
- Location: Purfleet, Essex, England
- Organisation(s): Professional Darts Corporation
- Format: Sets; Final – best of 13
- Prize fund: £205,000
- Winner's share: £50,000
- High checkout: 167 Phil Taylor (ENG)

Champion(s)
- Phil Taylor (ENG)

The 2002 PDC World Darts Championship (known for sponsorship reasons as the 2002 Skol World Darts Championship) was a professional darts tournament held from 28 December 2001 to 5 January 2002 at the Circus Tavern in Purfleet, Essex. It was the ninth staging of the competition beginning with the 1994 edition and the ninth time it was held at the Circus Tavern. The competition was the first of 30 Professional Darts Corporation (PDC) tournaments in the 2002 season.

Nine-time world champion Phil Taylor whitewashed second-time finalist Peter Manley 7–0 in the final. It was a rematch of the final of the 1999 PDC World Championship, which Taylor also won. Taylor won his eighth consecutive world championship and tenth overall. He defeated Paul Williams, Shayne Burgess, the 2001 tournament runner-up John Part, and Dave Askew on his way to the final. Taylor also achieved a 167 checkout, the highest of the competition, in his second round match against Burgess.

== Tournament summary ==
=== Background ===
The Professional Darts Corporation (PDC) was established under the World Darts Council name by the managers John Markovic, Tommy Cox and Dick Allix and the world's top 16 players in January 1992 as a separate body from the British Darts Organisation (BDO). The PDC World Darts Championship was first held in 1994 and is one of two world championships in the game of darts: the other being the BDO World Darts Championship. The 2002 tournament was held between 28 December 2001 and 5 January 2002 in Purfleet, Essex, and was the first of 30 PDC-sanctioned events in the 2002 season. It was the ninth edition of the tournament and featured a 32-player main draw that was played at the Circus Tavern.

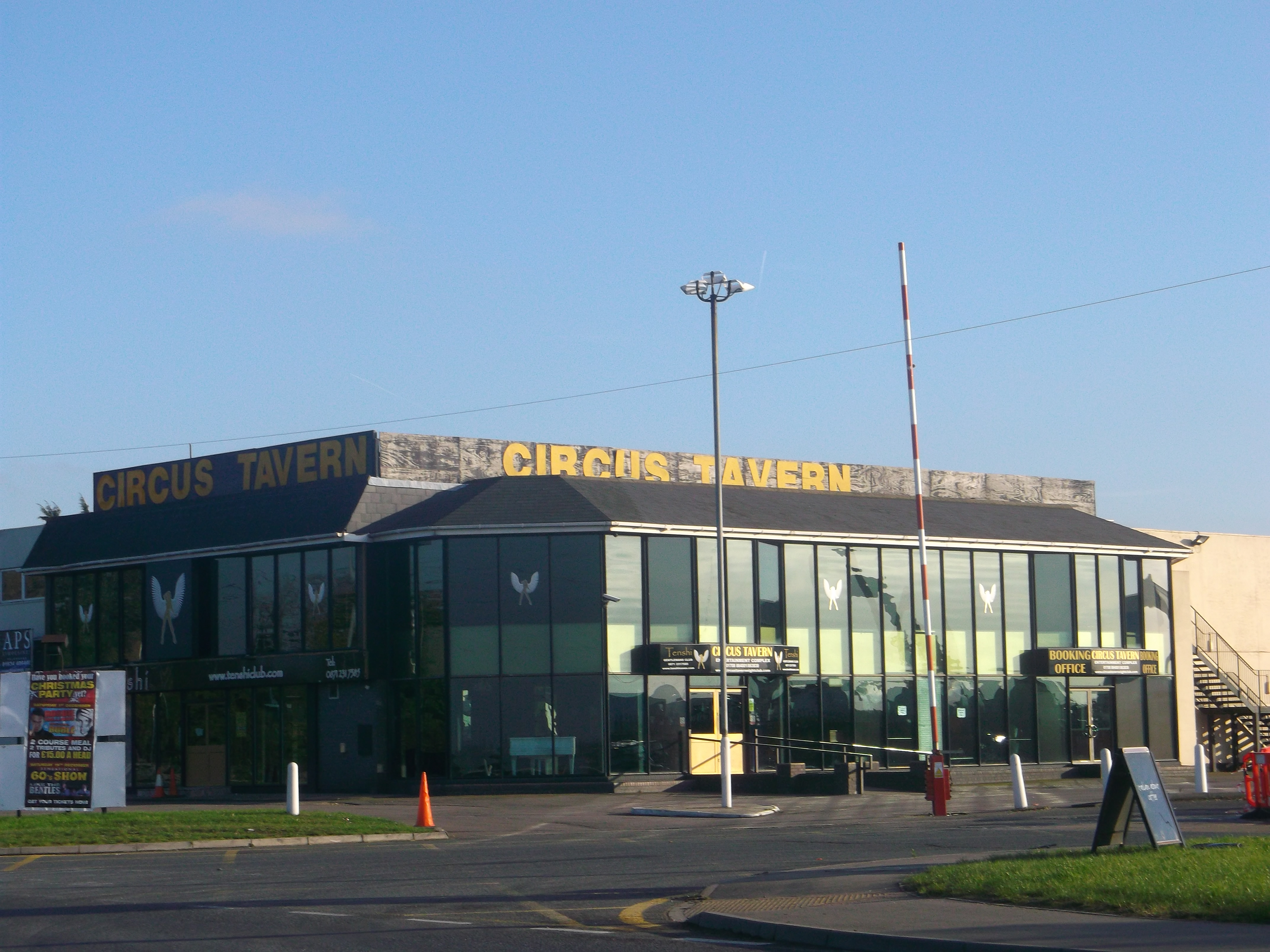
The Circus Tavern, where the tournament was held

A total of 31 players automatically qualified for the main draw with 16 of them seeded. Alan Warriner was seeded first and Phil Taylor was the second seed. The remaining place was decided by a play-off round contested by members of the Professional Dart Players Association at the Beaufort Arms, Birmingham on 8 December 2001. Matt Chapman was the player who advanced from qualifying to the main draw, making his debut and only appearance at the tournament. Six more players debuted in the competition: Ronnie Baxter, Steve Beaton, Andy Jenkins, Chris Mason, Kevin Painter and Paul Williams after they moved to the PDC from the BDO. The maximum number of sets contested in a match increased from seven in the first round to eleven from the second round to the semi-finals, leading up to the final which was played as best-of-thirteen sets. Sponsored by the lager company Skol, the tournament had a total prize fund of £205,000, and the host broadcaster was Sky Sports.

Bookmakers and pundits considered Taylor the favourite to claim his eighth world championship in a row and tenth overall. Taylor said he had practised heavily to prepare for the tournament after he lost to Painter in the first round of the World Grand Prix: "I'm hungrier than I've ever been, so all those players who feel I can be beaten are going to be shown I am out to win and no one will be in my way. I have been doing loads of practice, three or four hours a day. I'm feeling good."

=== Round 1 ===
The draw for the first round of the championship was televised live on Sky Sports News and conducted by the broadcaster Sid Waddell, the director of the world championship Tommy Cox, and Painter in the late afternoon on 10 December 2001. The first round of the competition, in which all 32 players participated, took place from 28 and 30 December 2001. In this round the 2001 World Grand Prix champion Warriner defeated Reg Harding 4–2. Warriner won the first two sets before Harding took sets three and five for a 3–2 scoreline. He beat Harding 3–2 in the sixth set to win the match. Warriner said afterwards that his performance was inadequate. Colin Lloyd won 4–2 over Alex Roy after he came from 2–0 behind in the first and completing the fourth set with a 100 checkout. World number five and World Grand Prix semi-finalist Dennis Smith achieved the tournament's first whitewash when he defeated Paul Lim 4–0; Lim won only three legs during the match.

Former world champion and eighth ranked Richie Burnett compiled checkouts of 142 and 124 points to defeat Peter Evison 4–1, a game which saw Evison fail to complete a nine-dart finish in the first leg of the third set after one of his darts landed less than 0.25 in (6.4 mm) away from the double 18 outer ring. Baxter achieved a three-dart average of 103 to defeat Painter 4–2. He led 3–1 before Painter won set five; Baxter won with a finish on the double 16 inner ring. The Irish Masters champion Denis Ovens converted a two-set deficit to Jenkins to force a final set decider which he won to claim a 4–3 victory. World number four Peter Manley achieved set victories of 3–1 and 3–0 to lead Steve Brown 2–0. Brown made a 115 checkout to win the third set before Manley took sets four and five to win 4–1 and progress to the second round of a PDC tournament for the first time since October 2000. In his 25th world championship appearance, John Lowe came from one set against Les Fitton to win four sets in a row. Lowe finished on the double nine outer ring to win 4–1.

Shayne Burgess defeated Jamie Harvey 4–3; trailing 2–1 Burgess took the first two legs of set four and another three to equal the scoreline. He then took the next set before Harvey forced a final set decider. Checkouts of 111 and 85 put Burgess ahead until Harvey reduced his advantage. Harvey then missed five dart throws to land in an outer double ring and Burgess won the match. Another 4–3 victory occurred when Steve Beaton defeated Bob Anderson after leading 3–1 and Anderson won two sets in a row. After winning the sixth set, Beaton forced a final set decider, which he won 5–3. Taylor achieved a three-dart average of 98.2 points in defeating Paul Williams 4–1. Dave Askew defeated the English Open champion Mason 4–3 in a seven-set match. The World Grand Prix runner-up Roland Scholten won 4–1 over Cliff Lazarenko. Scholten took the opening set before Lazarenko made an 82 checkout to win the second. Scholten won three consecutive sets to enter the second round.

John Part, the runner-up of the 2001 edition, won 4–2 against Mick Manning. Part took the first two sets and Manning the third. Manning compiled a 110 checkout and had a finish on the double ten outer ring to win set four after Part missed five chances to hit an outer double ring. Part then won six legs in a row to win the match. World number three Rod Harrington beat Keith Deller, the 1983 world champion, 4–3. Tied 2–2, Harrington argued with Deller about a perceived positioning of Deller's left leg in retrieving his darts from the board and the time it took to do so. That caused Harrington to clip Deller's heel while he was throwing, which he did not admit to doing until 2016. Deller won the fifth set with a finish on the outer double 16 ring. Harrington took the sixth set to force a final set decider, which he won on a 58 checkout. Harrington kicking Deller was the catalyst for the creation of the exclusion zone, an area that players are not allowed to enter when their opponent is in action. In the first round's final match the two-time world champion Dennis Priestley lost a solitary set in a 4–1 win over Chapman.

=== Round 2 ===
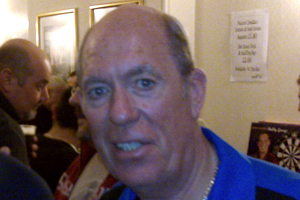
John Lowe (pictured in 2009) was eliminated in the second round of the tournament

The second round was played to the best-of-11 sets from 30 December 2000 and 2 January 2001. Lloyd became the first player through to the quarter-finals with a 6–4 victory over Warriner, who was the first player ranked in the top ten to lose in the tournament. Lloyd took the first three sets before Warriner took a 4–3 lead. He then recovered to win the match, calling it "one of the best performances of my career." Burnett took more than two hours to defeat Ovens 6–4 after neither player led by more than a set until the end of the match. Baxter took a little more than one hour to beat Smith 6–1. He claimed the first set and Smith the second. Baxter's higher finishing average won him six consecutive legs in the middle of the game en route to victory. Manley defeated Lowe 6–5. He took the lead in set one before Lowe claimed the second with a 121 checkout. Lowe won sets three and four to take the lead until Manley nullified this to tie the match. The game went to a final set decider which Manley won 3–0. After the match, Manley said he had not expected a strong performance from Lowe.

Taylor had a three-dart average of 111.21 points, completed respective checkouts of 140 and 167 points and two finishes of ten dart throws to defeat Burgess 6–1; Burgess won four legs during the game's concluding two sets. Winning nine consecutive legs for the third, fourth and fifth set, Taylor averaged 124.10 in those three sets, including two sets finished in 35 darts each, averaging 128.83 in each of them.

Askew overcame a challenge from Scholten to win 6–3. Both players equalled each other's form before Askew moved ahead with victories in the fifth and sixth sets. Scholten subsequently made a 13-dart finish to claim set seven before Askew replied to win the next two sets and the match. Part compiled ten maximum scores (180), checkouts of 116 and 117 and achieved a three-dart average of 98.68 points to complete a 6–0 whitewash of Beaton. The final second round match saw Priestley play the two time World Matchplay champion Harrington. After both players began at a slow pace with Harrington compiling high scores and missing checkouts and Priestley making checkouts without high scores, the latter took the lead in the match and a 6–3 victory after Harrington failed to complete a 169 checkout.

=== Quarter-finals ===
The four quarter-finals were played as best-of-11 sets on 3 January 2002. The first quarter-final match was played between Lloyd and Burnett. Although Burnett was heavily favoured to win, Lloyd took a 5–0 lead and appeared set to complete a 6–0 whitewash until Burnett won four consecutive sets to go 5–4 behind. Lloyd took three successive legs to win the match 6–4 and was the first player to earn a semi-final berth. Lloyd said post-match that he was surprised over his early lead: "I've played good darts in the last three games but I've let them come back at me. But the main thing about my play this year is that I haven't let my head drop. They have come back at me but I've said 'keep fighting Lloydy' and you're going to get there. That's what's made the difference. I'm not going to give up." The second game had Askew take an early lead over Priestley until the latter won two sets in a row to lead 2–1. Askew then tied the match at 2–2 and took four more sets and made a 100 checkout to win 6–2.

In the next quarter-final, pre-match favourite Baxter played Manley. Both players shared the first four sets before Manley achieved a 123 checkout in the fifth set to move into a clear lead. Manley claimed three more sets for a 6–2 victory. The final match of the quarter-finals saw Taylor play Part in a rematch of the 2001 world championship final. Taylor took the first three sets before he achieved seven maximums and failed to complete a nine-dart finish in the fourth set when his eighth dart throw landed inside the single seven ring. He then completed a 6–0 whitewash of Part after he won two more sets and had achieved a three-dart average of 100.23 points; Part forced a final leg decider in the fifth and sixth sets before Taylor defeated him. Taylor admitted he had not expected to whitewash Part: "I thought I would be beat him but not so easily. I think John is a better player than that. The way he played against Steve Beaton was brilliant and no one beats Steve 6–0 easily."

=== Semi-finals ===
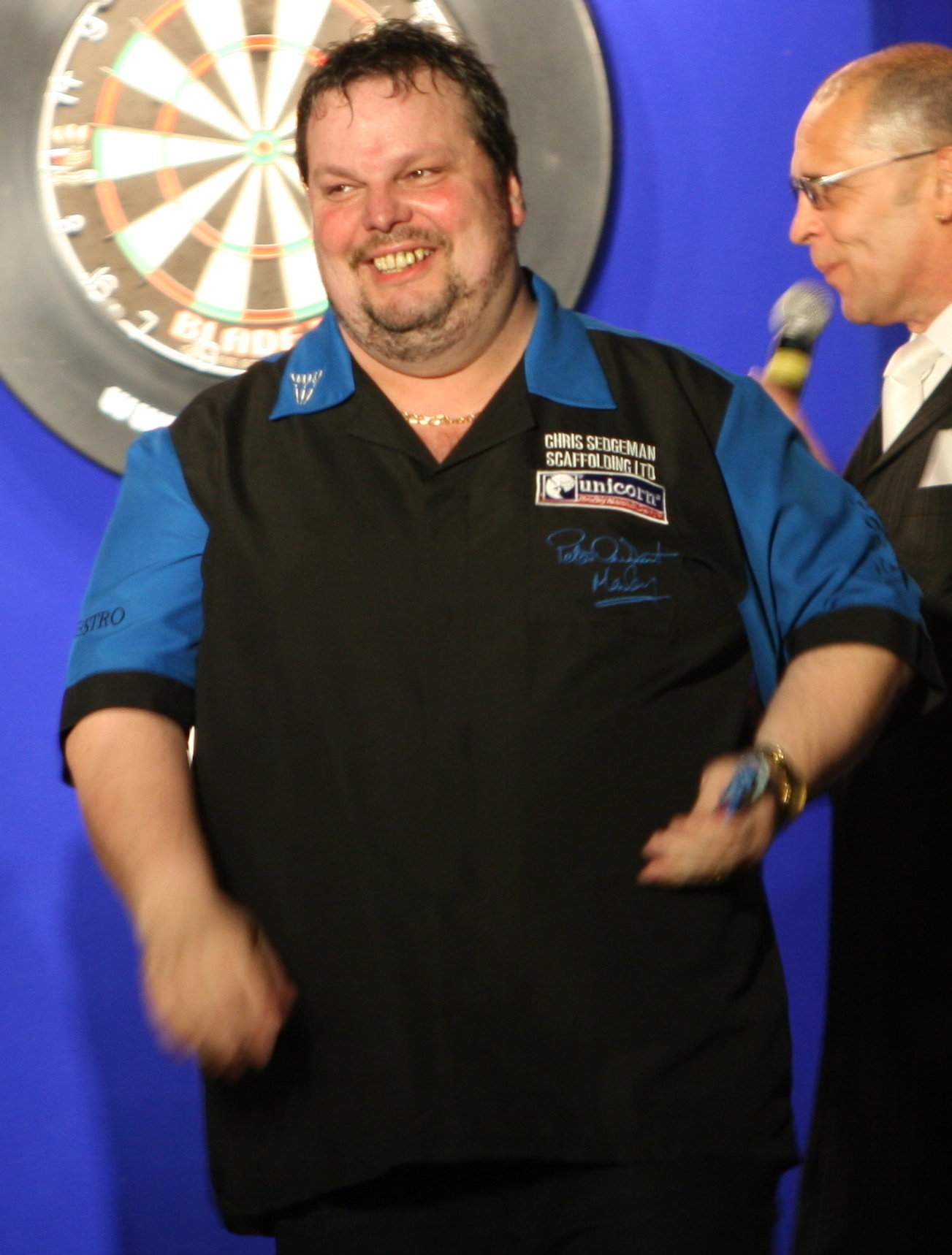
Peter Manley (pictured in 2007) reached the second world championship final of his career with a 6–4 win over Colin Lloyd.

Both of the semi-finals were best-of-11 sets on 4 January 2002. The first semi-final pitted Manley against Lloyd. Manley won the first set and Lloyd the second from checkouts of 105, 137 and 46. Lloyd took the third set after Manley produced a 111 checkout from eleven darts thrown. Both players shared the following two sets; Manley took the fourth on the outer double ten ring and Lloyd the fifth from checkouts of 134 and 91. Manley won sets six and seven and Lloyd the eighth. Manley retook the lead after the ninth set and claimed a 6–4 victory after the final set went to a fifth leg which he won on the outer double eight ring. Lloyd made ten maximums to Manley's eight. Manley said he was annoyed with the easy removal of flights on Lloyd's darts and felt the latter slowed the match. Lloyd stated a warm arena reduced his hand grip and denied employing gamesmanship to slow Manley.

Taylor faced Askew in the other semi-final. Askew took the first two legs of the first set. Taylor came from behind to claim the set after Askew missed four opportunities to hit a double in its third leg. Taylor subsequently won the next six legs to lead 3–0. Askew ended the streak by winning one leg in the fourth set as Taylor secured the set. Taylor then took sets five and six for a 6–1 win, only losing one leg in each of the final two sets. Post-match Taylor said Askew had put him under pressure: "I could feel Dave was under pressure from the start and I knew that if he hit 140, then I had to follow him. I just kept on top of him", and commented on Manley's challenge to him, "It's either going to be a walkover or a cracker, and I think it will be a good match. Peter will push me, but If I push him back he'll go."

=== Final ===
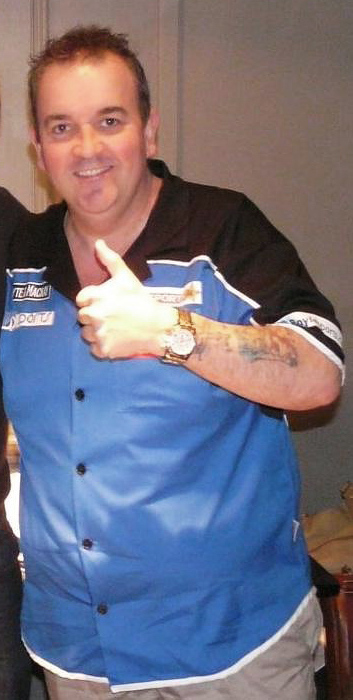
Phil Taylor (pictured in 2009) won his tenth world darts championship and eighth in a row with a 7–0 whitewash of Manley.

The final between Manley and Taylor on 5 January 2002 was contested as the best-of-13 sets. To reach the 2002 final, Taylor had defeated Paul Williams, Shayne Burgess, John Part and Dave Askew, while Manley had beaten Steve Brown, John Lowe, Ronnie Baxter and Colin Lloyd. This was Taylor's eleventh world championship final and his ninth in a row in the PDC. He had previously won the world championship nine times in 1990, 1992, 1995, 1996, 1997, 1998, 1999, 2000 and 2001. Manley appeared in his second world championship final, having finished runner-up to Taylor in the 1999 tournament.

Taylor won the first set 3–0. Manley was unable to land a dart in the outer double 20 ring in the second set before he completed a checkout on the outer double ten ring to win his first leg of the match. He then was unable to convert eight more opportunities and Taylor's finishing allowed him to clinch set two 3–1. In the third set Taylor produced a 104 checkout and a 13-dart finish to win it 3–0. Taylor led the fourth set 2–0 when he failed to convert a 100 checkout and Manley won the third leg. He then responded to compile a 11-dart finish and take the set. The fifth set saw Manley win his first leg after he missed the outer double eight ring on his first try. Taylor took four legs in a row to win the fifth set 3–1 and the sixth 3–0. In the first leg of the final set, Manley was unable to land a dart in the outer double ten ring and Taylor whitewashed him 7–0 to win the world championship. It was Taylor's tenth world championship win and eighth in a row; he won £50,000 for winning the tournament and a further £1,000 for compiling its highest checkout, a 167.

After the match, Manley did not shake Taylor's hand and walked off the stage to use the urinal facilities. He later shook Taylor's hand but not before the crowd booed him. Taylor said he was delighted to win the championship and represented Manley leaving the stage as less important than it was: "What you must remember is all the professionals are winners and Peter deserved to be up here in the final. He was gutted but he came back and shook my hand and that is the end of it. It is extra special because it is £50,000 and I do feel sorry for people who had a bet on a nine-darter because with me and Pete I thought it might come." Taylor said he wanted to win 13 world championships because it is his lucky number. Manley said he enjoyed playing in the final and complimented Taylor's ability: "I had some hard games to come through and I beat my mate Ronnie Baxter and he would probably have been a better player to beat Phil tonight. But Phil is the greatest player ever to walk the earth."

Writing for The Daily Telegraph journalist Simon Hughes felt Taylor's tenth world championship had exceeded the achievements of the snooker players Steve Davis and Stephen Hendry and the rower Steve Redgrave. Mel Webb of The Times felt Taylor's number of world championships was unlikely to be eclipsed by other players bar Taylor himself: "Nobody, not even Tiger Woods or Don Bradman, has dominated his sport as overwhelmingly as Taylor does his."

== Prize fund ==
The breakdown of prize money for 2002 is shown below.

- Winner: £50,000
- Runner-up: £25,000
- Semi-finalists (×2): £12,500
- Quarter-finalists (×4): £7,000
- Last 16 (×8): £4,500
- Last 32 (×16): £2,500
- 9 dart checkout: £100,000
- Highest checkout: £1,000
- Total: £205,000

== Draw ==
Numbers given to the left of players' names show the seedings for the top 16 in the tournament. The sole qualifier is indicated by a (Q). The figures to the right of a competitor's name state their three-dart averages in a match. Players in bold denote match winners.

=== Last 32 ===
**First round** (best of 7 sets); 28–30 December
1	**Alan Warriner** (ENG) 80.78	**4**
Reg Harding (ENG) 82.71	2
16	Alex Roy (ENG) 90.29	2
**Colin Lloyd** (ENG) 91.37	**4**
8	**Richie Burnett** (WAL) 94.37	**4**
Peter Evison (ENG) 81.78	1
9	**Denis Ovens** (ENG) 88.44	**4**
Andy Jenkins (ENG) 83.49	3
5	**Dennis Smith** (ENG) 86.50	**4**
Paul Lim (SGP) 78.34	0
12	**Ronnie Baxter** (ENG) 99.39	**4**
Kevin Painter (ENG) 89.90	2
4	**Peter Manley** (ENG) 90.33	**4**
Steve Brown (USA) 80.87	1
13	**John Lowe** (ENG) 80.79	**4**
Les Fitton (ENG) 83.29	1
2	**Phil Taylor** (ENG) 98.24	**4**
Paul Williams (ENG) 88.06	1
15	Jamie Harvey (SCO) 89.06	3
**Shayne Burgess** (ENG) 85.12	**4**
7	**John Part** (CAN)93.52	**4**
Mick Manning (ENG) 85.88	2
10	**Steve Beaton** (ENG) 85.24	**4**
Bob Anderson (ENG) 85.56	3
6	**Roland Scholten** (NED) 89.48	**4**
Cliff Lazarenko (ENG) 88.03	1
11	**Dave Askew** (ENG) 88.54	**4**
Chris Mason (ENG) 88.08	3
3	**Rod Harrington** (ENG) 82.72	**4**
Keith Deller (ENG) 81.15	3
14	**Dennis Priestley** (ENG) 83.63	**4**
Q	Matt Chapman (ENG) 83.73	1

**Second round** (best of 11 sets); 30 December – 2 January
1	(England) Alan Warriner 85.14	4
(England) **Colin Lloyd** 88.62	**6**
8	(Wales) **Richie Burnett** 90.18	**6**
9	(England) Denis Ovens 89.35	4
5	(England) Dennis Smith 91.34	1
12	(England) **Ronnie Baxter** 92.81	**6**
4	(England) **Peter Manley** 89.23	**6**
13	(England) John Lowe 86.89	5
2	(England) **Phil Taylor** 111.21	**6**
(England) Shayne Burgess 90.53	1
7	(Canada) **John Part** 98.68	**6**
10	(England) Steve Beaton 95.84	0
6	(Netherlands) Roland Scholten 89.67	3
11	(England) **Dave Askew** 87.69	**6**
3	(England) Rod Harrington 79.55	3
14	(England) **Dennis Priestley** 80.85	**6**

**Quarter-finals** (best of 11 sets); 3 January
(England) **Colin Lloyd** 91.27	**6**
8	(Wales) Richie Burnett 91.12	4
12	(England) Ronnie Baxter 90.89	2
4	(England) **Peter Manley** 92.21	**6**
2	(England) **Phil Taylor** 100.23	**6**
7	(Canada) John Part 92.90	0
11	(England) **Dave Askew** 87.94	**6**
14	(England) Dennis Priestley 91.26	2

**Semi-finals** (best of 11 sets); 4 January
(England) Colin Lloyd 88.83	4
4	(England) **Peter Manley** 89.80	**6**
2	(England) **Phil Taylor** 99.97	**6**
11	(England) Dave Askew 87.54	0

**Final** (best of 13 sets); 5 January
4	(England) Peter Manley 91.36	0
2	(England) **Phil Taylor** 98.47	**7**
