= Steve Raw =

English darts player

Personal information
- Nickname: "The Lion"
- Born: 1966
- Home town: Barnard Castle, County Durham, England

Sport
- Sport: Darts
- Playing since: 1986
- Darts: 17g
- Laterality: Right-handed

Organisation (see split in darts)
- PDC: 1994–2001

PDC premier events – best performances
- World Championship: Last 16: 2000
- World Matchplay: Last 16: 1999

Other tournament wins
- Years
| Witch City Open Pairs | 1995 |

Steve Raw is an English former professional darts player who competed in Professional Darts Corporation (PDC) events.

== Career ==
Originally a county player in the North East, Raw became one of the earliest members of the newly-formed Professional Darts Corporation (then WDC) in 1994, playing in the inaugural World Matchplay and losing in the first round to eventual champion Larry Butler. Raw would become a mainstay of early PDC events thereafter. attracting attention in his first World Championship appearance due to being a replacement for former world champion Jocky Wilson.

Despite a relatively pedestrian televised event record (not passing the last sixteen in either the World Matchplay or World Championship), he did achieve one notable result in a major event, reaching the 1996 PDC World Pairs final in conjunction with Chris Mason. They lost 18-15 to Phil Taylor and Bob Anderson. He would also be contemporaneously noted for a strange throwing action by fellow dart player Paul Nicholson.

Raw left the professional dart scene in 2001 after deciding not to return from a trip he had taken to the United States with fellow dart player Shayne Burgess. He still resides in America to this day.

== World Championship performances ==
=== PDC ===
- 1996: Last 24 Group: (beat Gary Mawson 3–0 & lost to Peter Evison 2–3)
- 1997: Last 24 Group: (beat Cliff Lazarenko 3–1 & lost to Peter Evison 1–3)
- 1998: Last 24 Group: (beat Eric Bristow 3–0 & lost to Dennis Priestley 0–3)
- 1999: Last 32: (lost to Graeme Stoddart 1–3)
- 2000: Last 16: (lost to Peter Evison 1–3)
- 2001: Last 32: (lost to Alex Roy 2–3)

== Performance timeline ==
PDC

| Tournament | 1994 | 1995 | 1996 | 1997 | 1998 | 1999 | 2000 | 2001 |
|---|---|---|---|---|---|---|---|---|
| PDC World Championship | DNP | DNP | L24 | L24 | L24 | L32 | L16 | L32 |
| World Matchplay | L32 | L32 | L32 | L32 | L32 | L16 | L32 | DNP |
