= 1998 Denmark Open darts =

Denmark Open

Tournament information
- Dates: 1998
- Country: Denmark
- Organisation(s): BDO, WDF, DDU

Champion(s)
- (England) Rod Harrington

1998 Denmark Open is a darts tournament, which took place in Denmark in 1998.

== Results ==
Round	Player
Winner	(England) Rod Harrington
Final	(England) Peter Manley
Semi-finals	(England) Robbie Widdows
Semi-finals	(England) Mervyn King
Quarter-finals	(England) Chris Mason
Quarter-finals	(England) Andy Jenkins
Quarter-finals	(England) Tony Smith
Quarter-finals	(England) Peter Smith
Last 16	(England) Darryl Fitton
Last 16	(England) Alex Roy
Last 16	(England) Dennis Priestley
Last 16	(England) Peter Evison
Last 16	(England) Shayne Burgess
Last 16	(England) Alan Warriner
Last 16	(England) Ronnie Baxter
Last 16	(Netherlands) Raymond van Barneveld
