= Dennis Smith (darts player) =

English darts player (born 1969)

Personal information
- Nickname: Smiffy
- Born: 2 August 1969 (age 57) Reading, Berkshire, England
- Home town: Swindon, Wiltshire, England

Sport
- Sport: Darts
- Playing since: 1978
- Darts: 18 Gram Red Dragon
- Laterality: Right-handed
- Walk-on music: "London Calling" by The Clash

Organisation (see split in darts)
- PDC: 1994–2016

WDF major events – best performances
- World Masters: Last 128: 2002

PDC premier events – best performances
- World Championship: Semi-final: 2000
- World Matchplay: Quarter-final: 1996, 2001, 2003, 2005
- World Grand Prix: Semi-final: 2001, 2005
- UK Open: Last 32: 2003, 2004, 2010, 2012
- Desert Classic: Quarter-final: 2003, 2004, 2007
- US Open/WSoD: Last 64: 2007

Other tournament wins
- Years
Eastbourne Open	2013
LPKD Find a Pro Day	2010
Sunparks Masters	2001
Vauxhall Autumn Pro	2004
WDC National Pro Dart League	1996
Weoley Castle Open	2010

Dennis Smith (born 2 August 1969) is a former English professional darts player who played in Professional Darts Corporation (PDC) events. He was a stalwart on the PDC circuit, having played there since 1994, but has yet to capture a major title to add to his collection of Open wins. Smith has a very unusual throwing action, turning the dart into a 'flight first' position before returning it to a 'point first' position, rolling his eyes and then throwing. He has a unique, measured action learning his trade under the tutelage of Bob Anderson.

== PDC career ==
Smith's first major event came in the inaugural World Matchplay in 1994, beating Dave Kelly in the first round but lost in the second round to Shayne Burgess. Smith then made his PDC World Darts Championship debut in 1995, defeating Alan Warriner and Tom Kirby to win group 4 and reach the quarter-finals, losing to John Lowe. Smith then suffered a first-round exit in the 1995 World Matchplay and the 1996 PDC World Darts Championship. He reached the quarter-finals of the 1996 World Matchplay, beating Eric Bristow in the first round and then beat Lowe in round two before losing to Jamie Harvey. He then suffered a second successive first-round exit in the 1997 World Championship.

Smith then went through a poor run of form, reaching the second round in the 1997 World Matchplay, but suffered first-round exits in the 1998 World Championship and the 1998 World Matchplay. At the 1999 PDC World Darts Championship, he beat Peter Evison and Mick Manning to reach the quarter-finals, losing to Peter Manley. Though another first-round exit at the World Matchplay followed, Smith achieved his best run in the 2000 PDC World Darts Championship, beating Cliff Lazarenko, John Part and Lowe to reach the semi-finals for the first time, losing 5–0 to Taylor.

Smith then reached the second round of the 2000 World Matchplay and the 2000 World Grand Prix as well as the 2001 PDC World Darts Championship. Smith followed up with a quarter-final place in the 2001 World Matchplay and a semi-final place in the 2001 World Grand Prix. A second-round exit in the World Championship followed. Smith played in the first Las Vegas Desert Classic in 2002, losing in the first round to Simon Whatley. He also lost in the first round of the 2002 World Matchplay but followed up by reaching the semi-finals of the Bob Anderson Classic and the quarter-finals of the World Grand Prix as well as the 2003 World Championship.

Smith made three quarter-finals in major tournaments in 2003, in the Desert Classic, World Matchplay and the World Grand Prix, but lost in the second round of the 2004 World Championship. Another quarter final in the Desert Classic in 2004 was followed up by a spell of poor form as Smith began battling personal problems while going through a divorce. Though he reached the quarter-finals of the World Matchplay and the semi-finals of the World Grand Prix in 2005, poor performances in floor events saw Smith slide down the rankings. Smith reached the second round in the 2006 PDC World Darts Championship. It would begin a complete loss of form for Smith where poor performances including a second-round exit from the 2006 UK Open forced him to qualify for major tournaments. He qualified for the 2006 Las Vegas Desert Classic, losing in the first round to Dennis Priestley. He then suffered a first-round defeat in the World Matchplay and failed to qualify for the World Grand Prix and then failed to qualify for the World Championship for the first time.

Smith qualified for the Desert Classic. He was knocked out in the quarter-finals by Part after beating Priestley and Darin Young. He then qualified again for the Desert Classic in 2008, but lost in the first round to James Wade.

He qualified for the 2009 PDC World Darts Championship, winning four matches at the qualifiers in Telford to take one of the last eight places at the Alexandra Palace. He caused a surprise by beating number five seed Terry Jenkins in the first round. He then defeated Kevin McDine in the second round, coming from three sets to nil down to level the match at three sets all and eventually won the match 4–3. He went out in round three, losing 4–1 to Mervyn King.

He attempted unsuccessfully to win a PDC Tour Card at 2020 Q School.

== World Championship performances ==
=== PDC ===
- 1995: Quarter-finals (lost to John Lowe 0–4)
- 1996: Last 24 group (lost to John Lowe 0–3) & (lost to Tom Kirby 1–3)
- 1997: Last 24 group (lost to Keith Deller 2–3) & (beat Kevin Spiolek 3–0)
- 1998: Last 24 group (lost to Phil Taylor 3–0) & (beat Kevin Spiolek 3–1)
- 1999: Quarter-finals (lost to Peter Manley 0–4)
- 2000: Semi-finals (lost to Phil Taylor 0–5)
- 2001: 2nd round (lost to John Part 2–3)
- 2002: 2nd round (lost to Ronnie Baxter 1–6)
- 2003: Quarter-finals (lost to Phil Taylor 3–5)
- 2004: 4th round (lost to Bob Anderson 3–4)
- 2005: 3rd round (lost to Bob Anderson 2–4)
- 2006: 3rd round (lost to Peter Manley 3–4)
- 2009: 3rd round (lost to Mervyn King 1–4)
- 2011: 1st round (lost to Andy Hamilton 0–3)
- 2012: 1st round (lost to Simon Whitlock 0–3)
- 2014: 1st round (lost to Adrian Lewis 0–3)

== Performance timeline ==
Tournament	1994	1995	1996	1997	1998	1999	2000	2001	2002	2003	2004	2005	2006	2007	2008	2009	2010	2011	2012	2013	2014	2015	2016
PDC World Championship	DNQ	QF	RR	RR	RR	QF	SF	2R	2R	QF	4R	3R	3R	DNQ		3R	DNQ	1R	1R	DNQ	1R	DNQ	
World Matchplay	2R	1R	QF	2R	1R	1R	2R	QF	1R	QF	2R	QF	1R	Did not qualify									
World Grand Prix	Not held						2R	SF	QF	QF	2R	SF	Did not qualify										
Las Vegas Desert Classic	Not held								1R	QF	QF	DNQ	1R	QF	1R	DNQ	Not held						
UK Open	Not held									4R	4R	4R	2R	4R	2R	2R	4R	1R	4R	3R	2R	2R	1R
Winmau World Masters	Did not participate								1R	Did not participate													

Performance Table Legend
DNP	Did not play at the event	DNQ	Did not qualify for the event	NYF	Not yet founded	#R	lost in the early rounds of the tournament (WR = Wildcard round, RR = Round robin)
QF	lost in the quarter-finals	SF	lost in the semi-finals	F	lost in the final	W	won the tournament
