= 2000 PDC World Darts Championship =

Tournament information
- Dates: 28 December 1999 – 4 January 2000
- Venue: Circus Tavern
- Location: Purfleet
- Country: England
- Organisation(s): PDC
- Format: Sets; Final – best of 13
- Prize fund: £111,000
- Winner's share: £31,000
- High checkout: 170 Steve Raw

Champion(s)
- Phil Taylor

The 2000 PDC World Darts Championship (known for sponsorship reasons as the 2000 Skol World Darts Championship) was the seventh World Championship organised by the Professional Darts Corporation (PDC). It was held between 28 December 1999 and 4 January 2000 at the Circus Tavern in Purfleet, Essex.

Phil Taylor beat Dennis Priestley in the final by 7 sets to 3, thus notching up his sixth successive World Championship and his eighth overall. As the tournament is staged earlier in the calendar year than most other World Championships in sport, Sky Sports commentators claimed that Taylor was the "first World Champion of the new millennium". For Priestley, it was the fourth time that he had lost to Taylor in the final in five years.

Eric Bristow's first-round defeat to American Steve Brown virtually signalled the end of the legendary player's career at the top level: this was to be the last time he appeared at a World Championship, having done so in 23 consecutive years stretching back to the inaugural event of 1978. John Lowe thus became the last remaining player with an unbroken appearance record.

== Seeds ==
1. (England) Peter Manley
2. (England) Phil Taylor
3. (England) Rod Harrington
4. (England) Shayne Burgess
5. (England) Dennis Priestley
6. (Canada) John Part
7. (England) Alan Warriner
8. (England) Peter Evison

== Prize money ==
The prize fund was £111,000.

Position (num. of players)		Prize money (Total: £111,000)
Winner	(1)	£31,000
Runner-Up	(1)	£16,400
Semi-finalists	(2)	£6,400
Quarter-finalists	(4)	£3,400
Second round losers	(8)	£1,825
First round losers	(16)	£1,350
Highest finish bonus	(1)	£1,000

== Results ==
First round (best of 5 sets); 28–29 December
1	(England) Peter Manley 85.54	3
(England) Bob Anderson 82.76	0
(United States) Steve Brown 83.09	3
(England) Eric Bristow 82.58	2
8	(England) Peter Evison 88.37	3
(United States) Gerald Verrier 79.74	0
(England) Steve Raw 87.46	3
(Canada) Scott Cummings 81.65	2
5	(England) Dennis Priestley 96.31	3
(Spain) Braulio Roncero 88.77	2
(Scotland) Jamie Harvey 87.58	3
(England) Kevin Spiolek 82.05	2
4	(England) Shayne Burgess 92.02	3
(England) Colin Lloyd 84.69	0
(England) Nigel Justice 81.25	3
(England) Dean Allsop 72.69	0
2	(England) Phil Taylor 103.26	3
(England) Mick Manning 78.83	0
(England) Graeme Stoddart 77.04	3
(United States) Dan Lauby 75.19	2
7	(England) Alan Warriner 92.26	3
(Singapore) Paul Lim 85.90	0
(England) Alex Roy 79.31	3
(England) Reg Harding 81.06	0
6	(Canada) John Part 97.32	3
(England) John Ferrell 79.57	0
(England) Dennis Smith 92.19	3
(England) Cliff Lazarenko 86.57	1
3	(England) Rod Harrington 93.55	2
(England) John Lowe 90.89	3
(England) Keith Deller 82.13	3
(United States) Gary Mawson 74.35	0

Second round (best of 5 sets); 30 December
1	(England) Peter Manley 90.49	3
(United States) Steve Brown 84.68	1
8	(England) Peter Evison 80.32	3
(England) Steve Raw 77.26	1
5	(England) Dennis Priestley 83.58	3
(Scotland) Jamie Harvey 84.91	2
4	(England) Shayne Burgess 91.60	3
(England) Nigel Justice 82.20	0
2	(England) Phil Taylor 103.80	3
(England) Graeme Stoddart 84.36	0
7	(England) Alan Warriner 90.00	3
(England) Alex Roy 78.25	0
6	(Canada) John Part 90.49	0
(England) Dennis Smith 91.31	3
(England) John Lowe 85.62	3
(England) Keith Deller 87.51	2

Quarter-finals (best of 9 sets); 1–2 January
1	(England) Peter Manley 87.13	5
8	(England) Peter Evison 80.71	1
5	(England) Dennis Priestley 90.24	5
4	(England) Shayne Burgess 89.37	4
2	(England) Phil Taylor 105.88	5
7	(England) Alan Warriner 92.25	0
(England) Dennis Smith 87.23	5
(England) John Lowe 87.61	3

Semi-finals (best of 9 sets); 3 January
1	(England) Peter Manley 97.07	2
5	(England) Dennis Priestley 98.76	5
2	(England) Phil Taylor 105.14	5
(England) Dennis Smith 88.40	0

Final (best of 13 sets); 4 January
5	(England) Dennis Priestley 91.79	3
2	(England) Phil Taylor 94.42	7

== Representation from different countries ==
This table shows the number of players by country in the World Championship. Six countries were represented in the World Championship, one more than in the previous championship.

	(England) ENG	(United States) USA	(Canada) CAN	(Scotland) SCO	(Spain) ESP	(Singapore) SGP	Total
Final	2	0	0	0	0	0	2
Semis	4	0	0	0	0	0	4
Quarters	8	0	0	0	0	0	8
Round 2	13	1	1	1	0	0	16
Round 1	23	4	2	1	1	1	32
