= Jamie Harvey =

Scottish darts player (1955–2025)

Personal information
- Nickname: "Bravedart"
- Born: 15 August 1955 Glasgow, Scotland
- Died: 4 September 2025 (aged 70) Barrhead, Scotland

Sport
- Sport: Darts
- Playing since: 1977
- Darts: 21g B&W Signature
- Laterality: Right-handed
- Walk-on music: "The Bonnie Banks o' Loch Lomond" by Runrig

Organisation (see split in darts)
- BDO: 1983–1993; 2011–2013
- PDC: 1993–2009 (founding member)

WDF major events – best performances
- World Championship: Last 16: 1992
- World Masters: Last 32: 1988, 1991, 1992

PDC premier events – best performances
- World Championship: Semi-final: 1996
- World Matchplay: Semi-final: 1996
- World Grand Prix: Last 16: 2003
- UK Open: Last 32: 2008
- Desert Classic: Last 24 Group: 2003

Other tournament wins
- Years
Antwerp Open	2000
Isle of Man Open	1991
Scottish Masters	1992
WDF Europe Cup Pairs	1992
- Updated on 18 February 2019

Jamie Harvey (15 August 1955 – 4 September 2025) was a Scottish professional darts player, who competed in Professional Darts Corporation (PDC) and British Darts Organisation (BDO) tournaments. Originally nicknamed “the Tartan Terror” he later used the nickname Bravedart for his matches – a play on the lead character from the film Braveheart. As darts began to introduce entrance tunes for its players during the 1990s, Harvey used to come to stage whilst the tune "The Bonnie Banks o' Loch Lomond" was played.

== Career ==
Having made his World Championship debut in 1992, Harvey was one of the players who started the Professional Darts Corporation (then known as the World Darts Council, WDC) in 1993 and played at every PDC World Championship between 1994 and 2006.

His best performance came in 1996 at the Circus Tavern, when he reached the semi-finals but lost 1–5 to Dennis Priestley. Later that year he also reached the semi-finals of the World Matchplay – losing 9–13 to eventual champion Peter Evison. He never made the final of any of the major PDC tournaments, but has won the Antwerp Open and also the Scottish Masters in his home country. He remained one of the most popular players on the circuit throughout his career.

Although he reached the quarter-finals of the 2001 World Championship and the quarter-finals of the 2004 World Matchplay his ranking began to decline in the followihg years. He started 2007 ranked 48 in the world, but failed to qualify for the World Championship for the first time that year. In the 2008 PDC World Darts Championship qualifiers, he won four matches before falling at the final hurdle to Jacko Barry and he slipped to 73rd in the PDC Order of Merit. He still competed at nine PDC Pro Tour events in 2007, but collected only £300 in prize money with a last 32 performance being his best. Harvey dropped to 129th on the PDC Order of Merit.

His final televised match was at the 2008 UK Open, where he reached the fourth round. Phil Taylor defeated him 9–1, hitting a nine-dart finish along the way.

Having been diagnosed with throat cancer, Harvey underwent surgery in September 2009 to remove a cancerous growth in his throat and also had his voice box removed.

In 2011, Harvey returned to the BDO, competing only in Scottish events.

== Death ==
Harvey died at his home in Barrhead, on the morning of 4 September 2025, at the age of 70.

== World Championship results ==
=== BDO ===
- 1992: 2nd round (lost to Kevin Kenny 2–3)
- 1993: 1st round (lost to Mike Gregory 0–3)

=== PDC ===
- 1994: Group stage (lost to Phil Taylor 1–3) & (lost to Jim Watkins 2–3)
- 1995: Quarter-final (lost to Rod Harrington 2–4)
- 1996: Semi-final (lost to Dennis Priestley 1–5)
- 1997: Quarter-final (lost to Peter Evison 3–5)
- 1998: Group stage (Beat John Ferrell 3–0) & (lost to Rod Harrington 2–3)
- 1999: 2nd round (lost to Bob Anderson 2–3)
- 2000: 2nd round (lost to Dennis Priestley 2–3)
- 2001: Quarter-final (lost to Dave Askew 0–4)
- 2002: 1st round (lost to Shayne Burgess 3–4)
- 2003: 3rd round (lost to John Part 3–5)
- 2004: 3rd round (lost to Steve Beaton 0–4)
- 2005: 3rd round (lost to Roland Scholten 2–4)
- 2006: 1st round (lost to Tomas Seyler 0–3)

== Performance timeline ==
BDO

Tournament	1983	1988	1989	1990	1991	1992	1993	2000
World Championship	Did not participate					2R	1R	DNP
Winmau World Masters	2R	3R	1R	1R	3R	3R	DNP	RR

PDC

Tournament	1994	1995	1996	1997	1998	1999	2000	2001	2002	2003	2004	2005	2006	2007	2008
World Championship	RR	QF	SF	QF	RR	2R	2R	QF	1R	3R	3R	3R	1R	DNQ	
World Matchplay	QF	2R	SF	1R	2R	2R	1R	1R	2R	2R	QF	1R	Did not qualify		
World Grand Prix	Not held				DNQ		1R	DNQ	1R	2R	1R	1R	Did not qualify		
Las Vegas Desert Classic	Not held								DNQ	RR	Did not qualify				
UK Open	Not held									3R	2R	3R	2R	3R	4R

Performance Table Legend
W	Won the tournament	F	Finalist	SF	Semifinalist	QF	Quarterfinalist	#R; RR; Prel.	Lost in # round Round-robin; Preliminary round	DQ	Disqualified
DNQ	Did not qualify	DNP	Did not participate	WD	Withdrew	NH	Tournament not held	#R; RR; Prel.	Lost in # round Round-robin; Preliminary round	NYF	Not yet founded
