= 1987 British Professional Championship =

Darts tournament

British Professional Championship

Tournament information
- Venue: Coatham Bowl
- Location: Redcar
- Country: England
- Organisation(s): BDO
- Format: Sets
- Month(s) Played: September

The 1987 British Professional Championship was a major darts tournament on the BDO/WDF calendar for 1987. It took place in late September at the Coatham Bowl, Redcar. It was broadcast on BBC Television.

The tournament featured 32 of the best players from around the world.

== Prize money ==
Total Prize fund was £38,200

- Champion £10,000
- Runner-up £5,500

== Results ==
First round (best of 5 sets)
(England) Mike Gregory	3
(England) Steve Jones	2
(England) Dennis Hickling	3
(England) Rod Booker	0
(Wales) Brian Cairns	3
(England) Cliff Lazarenko	0
(England) Steve Gittins	3
(England) Randy Bache	1
(England) Dave Whitcombe	3
(England) Ray Battye	2
(Wales) Leighton Rees	3
(England) Scott Coleman	2
(England) Olly Varney	3
(England) Eric Bristow	1
(England) Wayne Jones	3
(England) Denis Ovens	2
(England) John Lowe	3
(England) Alan Glazier	0
(Scotland) Ronnie Sharp	3
(Scotland) Peter MacDonald	0
(Scotland) Jocky Wilson	3
(England) Peter Masson	0
(England) Lyndon Hextall	3
(Wales) Chris Johns	2
(England) Keith Deller	3
(Wales) Peter Locke	0
(Scotland) Steve Parkes	3
(Scotland) Robert MacKenzie	1
(England) Ritchie Gardner	3
(England) Bob Anderson	0
(England) Peter Evison	3
(England) Paul Reynolds	2

Second round (best of 7 sets)
(England) Mike Gregory	3
(England) Dennis Hickling	4
(Wales) Brian Cairns	4
(England) Steve Gittins	3
(England) Dave Whitcombe	1
(Wales) Leighton Rees	4
(England) Olly Varney	1
(England) Wayne Jones	4
(England) John Lowe	1
(Scotland) Ronnie Sharp	4
(Scotland) Jocky Wilson	4
(England) Lyndon Hextall	1
(England) Keith Deller	4
(Scotland) Steve Parkes	2
(England) Ritchie Gardner	3
(England) Peter Evison	4

Quarter-finals (best of 9 sets)
(England) Dennis Hickling	5
(Wales) Brian Cairns	2
(Wales) Leighton Rees	5
(England) Wayne Jones	0
(Scotland) Ronnie Sharp	5
(Scotland) Jocky Wilson	4
(England) Keith Deller	5
(England) Peter Evison	2

Semi-finals (best of 11 sets)
(England) Dennis Hickling	5
(Wales) Leighton Rees	6
(Scotland) Ronnie Sharp	2
(England) Keith Deller	6

Final (best of 13 sets)
(Wales) Leighton Rees	5
(England) Keith Deller	7
