= 1999 World Matchplay =

Tournament information
- Dates: 25–31 July 1999
- Venue: Winter Gardens
- Location: Blackpool
- Country: England
- Organisation(s): PDC
- Format: Legs
- Prize fund: £58,000
- Winner's share: £14,000
- High checkout: 170 (England) Peter Evison (England) Colin Lloyd

Champion(s)
- (England) Rod Harrington

The 1999 World Matchplay was a darts tournament held in the Empress Ballroom at the Winter Gardens, Blackpool between 25–31 July 1999. The tournament was won for the second year in a row by Rod Harrington, who defeated Peter Manley in the final. With his victory, Harrington became the first player to retain the World Matchplay title. In the 30th leg of the final Manley missed a shot at bullseye which, had he hit it would have been the first televised PDC 9 dart finish.

This was the first time that the first round was best of 19 legs, instead of best of 15 legs used from the 1994 World Matchplay to the 1998 World Matchplay.

== Prize money ==
The prize fund was £58,000.

| Position (no. of players) | | Prize money (Total: £58,000) |
|---|---|---|
| Winner | (1) | £14,000 |
| Runner-Up | (1) | £7,000 |
| Semi-finalists | (2) | £3,500 |
| Quarter-finalists | (4) | £2,000 |
| Second round | (8) | £1,250 |
| First round | (16) | £750 |

== Seeds ==
There were eight seeds for the World Matchplay.

1. (England) Rod Harrington
2. (England) Peter Manley
3. (England) Phil Taylor
4. (England) Shayne Burgess
5. (England) Dennis Priestley
6. (Canada) John Part
7. (England) Alan Warriner
8. (England) Keith Deller

== Results ==
Players in bold denote match winners.

**First round** (best of 19 legs); 25–27 July
1 | (England) **Rod Harrington** 99.30 | **10**
(England) John Lowe 88.50 | 7
(England) Cliff Lazarenko 73.95 | 6
(England) **Steve Raw** 78.46 | **10**
8 | (England) Keith Deller 84.00 | 10
(England) **Bob Anderson** 84.48 | **12**
(England) **Peter Evison** 85.29 | **12**
(England) Dean Allsop 82.92 | 10
5 | (England) **Dennis Priestley** 95.28 | **10**
(United States) Paul Lim 82.11 | 6
(England) Dennis Smith 85.08 | 10
(United States) **Gary Mawson** 83.43 | **12**
4 | (England) **Shayne Burgess** 97.56 | **10**
(England) Kevin Spiolek 81.42 | 1
(England) **Mick Manning** 89.67 | **10**
(England) Eric Bristow 83.01 | 2
2 | (England) **Peter Manley** 94.41 | **10**
(Wales) Richie Burnett 91.71 | 4
(United States) Dan Lauby 84.06 | 5
(Scotland) **Jamie Harvey** 90.96 | **10**
7 | (England) **Alan Warriner** 85.29 | **10**
(England) John Ferrell 78.09 | 4
(Canada) Scott Cummings 84.05 | 8
(England) **Colin Lloyd** 89.52 | **10**
6 | (Canada) John Part 89.46 | 3
(England) **Chris Mason** 97.89 | **10**
(England) Graeme Stoddart 83.01 | 5
(United States) **Steve Brown** 87.26 | **10**
3 | (England) **Phil Taylor** 96.18 | **10**
(England) Ronnie Baxter 91.38 | 5
(England) **Reg Harding** 89.39 | **10**
(United States) Gerald Verrier 83.46 | 6

**Second round** (best of 25 legs); 27–28 July
1 | (England) **Rod Harrington** 87.03 | **13**
(England) Steve Raw 79.32 | 7
(England) Bob Anderson 83.12 | 8
(England) **Peter Evison** 89.41 | **13**
5 | (England) **Dennis Priestley** 91.04 | **13**
(United States) Gary Mawson 88.26 | 8
4 | (England) **Shayne Burgess** 102.03 | **13**
(England) Mick Manning 88.14 | 1
2 | (England) **Peter Manley** 89.73 | **13**
(Scotland) Jamie Harvey 85.41 | 7
7 | (England) Alan Warriner 82.85 | 2
(England) **Colin Lloyd** 89.40 | **13**
(England) **Chris Mason** 97.17 | **13**
(United States) Steve Brown 91.98 | 11
3 | (England) **Phil Taylor** 99.81 | **13**
(England) Reg Harding 94.38 | 10

**Quarter-finals** (best of 31 legs); 29 July
1 | (England) **Rod Harrington** 89.49 | **16**
(England) Peter Evison 81.85 | 9
5 | (England) **Dennis Priestley** 92.82 | **16**
4 | (England) Shayne Burgess 94.50 | 12
2 | (England) **Peter Manley** 89.43 | **16**
(England) Colin Lloyd 88.80 | 8
(England) Chris Mason 91.14 | 11
3 | (England) **Phil Taylor** 100.23 | **16**

**Semi-finals** (best of 33 legs); 30 July
1 | (England) **Rod Harrington** 93.83 | **17**
5 | (England) Dennis Priestley 93.81 | 10
2 | (England) **Peter Manley** 91.70 | **17**
3 | (England) Phil Taylor 95.01 | 14

**Final** (best of 35 legs); 31 July
1 | (England) **Rod Harrington** 85.94 | **19**
2 | (England) Peter Manley 86.92 | 17
