= 1998 PDC World Darts Championship =

Tournament information
- Dates: 29 December 1997 – 4 January 1998
- Venue: Circus Tavern
- Location: Purfleet
- Country: England
- Organisation(s): PDC
- Format: Sets; Final – best of 11
- Prize fund: £72,500
- Winner's share: £20,000
- High checkout: 170 Peter Evison

Champion(s)
- Phil Taylor

The 1998 PDC World Darts Championship (known for sponsorship reasons as the 1998 Skol World Darts Championship) was held between 29 December 1997 and 4 January 1998 at the Circus Tavern in Purfleet, Essex. Skol, who sponsored the inaugural event in 1994 returned as title sponsors – which they were to fulfil for the next five years.

Following an out-of-court settlement (Tomlin Order) on 30 June 1997, the World Darts Council (WDC) agreed to change its name to the Professional Darts Corporation (PDC) and the tournament was thus the PDC World Darts Championship.

John Part, who won the first BDO World Championship after the 1992–93 "split" had joined the PDC but failed to qualify beyond the group stage. Peter Manley had emerged as a rising talent in the PDC and was seeded 7th for the championship. He lost a close quarter-final to eventual finalist, Dennis Priestley. Priestley lost his third successive final to Phil Taylor – this defeat being the most convincing 6 sets to 0. Rod Harrington was the only player who managed to take any sets from the Power during his 2–5 semi-final defeat. This was the last year the PDC used the group stage in the championship.

Phil Taylor became the most successful player in World Championship history – winning his 6th title (4 in the PDC and 2 in the BDO), eclipsing Eric Bristow who won five titles during the 1980s. It was also Taylor's fourth title in a row.

== Seeds ==
1. (England) Phil Taylor
2. (England) Dennis Priestley
3. (England) Alan Warriner
4. (England) Peter Evison
5. (England) Rod Harrington
6. (England) Keith Deller
7. (England) Peter Manley
8. (England) Bob Anderson

== Prize money ==
The prize fund was £72,500.

Position (num. of players)		Prize money (Total: £72,500)
Winner	(1)	£20,000
Runner-Up	(1)	£10,000
Third place	(1)	£5,000
Fourth place	(1)	£4,000
Quarter-finalists	(4)	£2,000
Group stage	(16)	£1,500
Highest finish bonus	(1)	£1,500

== Results ==
=== Group stage ===
==== Group A ====
Pos	Player	P	W	L	SF	SA	+/-	Pts
1	(England) (1) Phil Taylor	2	2	0	6	0	+6	4
2	(England) Dennis Smith	2	1	1	3	4	–1	2
3	(England) Kevin Spiolek	2	0	2	1	6	–5	0

29 December–1 January

83.05 (1) Phil Taylor (England)	3 – 0	(England) Kevin Spiolek 66.99
81.98 Dennis Smith (England)	3 – 1	(England) Kevin Spiolek 81.21
96.96 (1) Phil Taylor (England)	3 – 0	(England) Dennis Smith 80.88

==== Group B ====
Pos	Player	P	W	L	SF	SA	+/-	Pts
1	(England) Shayne Burgess	2	2	0	6	0	+6	4
2	(England) (8) Bob Anderson	2	1	1	3	4	-1	2
3	(United States) Gerald Verrier	2	0	2	1	6	–5	0

29 December–1 January

79.60 (8) Bob Anderson (England)	0 – 3	(England) Shayne Burgess 84.40
83.92 (8) Bob Anderson (England)	3 – 1	(United States) Gerald Verrier 76.31
87.03 Shayne Burgess (England)	3 – 0	(United States) Gerald Verrier 80.07

==== Group C ====
Pos	Player	P	W	L	SF	SA	+/-	Pts
1	(England) (5) Rod Harrington	2	2	0	6	2	+4	4
2	(Scotland) Jamie Harvey	2	1	1	5	3	+2	2
3	(England) John Ferrell	2	0	2	0	6	−6	0

29 December–1 January

89.61 (5) Rod Harrington (England)	3 – 2	(Scotland) Jamie Harvey 88.31
89.47 Jamie Harvey (Scotland)	3 – 0	(England) John Ferrell 77.55
81.79 (5) Rod Harrington (England)	3 – 0	(England) John Ferrell 78.62

==== Group D ====
Pos	Player	P	W	L	SF	SA	+/-	Pts
1	(England) (4) Peter Evison	2	2	0	6	2	+4	4
2	(Canada) John Part	2	1	1	5	4	+1	2
3	(United States) Paul Lim	2	0	2	1	6	−5	0

29 December–1 January

85.61 (4) Peter Evison (England)	3 – 2	(Canada) John Part 85.31
74.82 Paul Lim (United States)	1 – 3	(Canada) John Part 81.43
82.97 (4) Peter Evison (England)	3 – 0	(United States) Paul Lim 84.29

==== Group E ====
Pos	Player	P	W	L	SF	SA	+/-	Pts
1	(England) (2) Dennis Priestley	2	2	0	6	0	+6	4
2	(England) Steve Raw	2	1	1	3	3	0	2
3	(England) Eric Bristow	2	0	2	0	6	−6	0

29 December–1 January

96.87 (2) Dennis Priestley (England)	3 – 0	(England) Steve Raw 82.01
78.74 Eric Bristow (England)	0 – 3	(England) Steve Raw 86.53
85.82 (2) Dennis Priestley (England)	3 – 0	(England) Eric Bristow 81.53

==== Group F ====
Pos	Player	P	W	L	SF	SA	+/-	Pts
1	(England) (7) Peter Manley	2	2	0	6	0	+6	4
2	(United States) Gary Mawson	2	1	1	3	3	0	2
3	(England) John Lowe	2	0	2	0	6	−6	0

29 December–1 January

91.36 (7) Peter Manley (England)	3 – 0	(United States) Gary Mawson 86.57
67.38 John Lowe (England)	0 – 3	(United States) Gary Mawson 76.83
90.88 (7) Peter Manley (England)	3 – 0	(England) John Lowe 79.63

==== Group G ====
Pos	Player	P	W	L	SF	SA	+/-	Pts
1	(England) (6) Keith Deller	2	1	1	5	4	+1	2
2	(England) Graeme Stoddart	2	1	1	4	3	+1	2
3	(England) Mick Manning	2	1	1	3	5	−2	2

29 December–1 January

77.82 (6) Keith Deller (England)	2 – 3	(England) Mick Manning 79.18
85.13 (6) Keith Deller (England)	3 – 1	(England) Graeme Stoddart 81.66
69.58 Mick Manning (England)	0 – 3	(England) Graeme Stoddart 79.69

==== Group H ====
Pos	Player	P	W	L	SF	SA	+/-	Pts
1	(England) Harry Robinson	2	1	1	5	3	+2	2
2	(United States) Steve Brown	2	1	1	4	5	−1	2
3	(England) (3) Alan Warriner	2	1	1	3	4	–1	2

29 December–1 January

85.28 (3) Alan Warriner (England)	0 – 3	(England) Harry Robinson 83.66
81.31 (3) Alan Warriner (England)	3 – 1	(United States) Steve Brown 78.93
82.86 Steve Brown (United States)	3 – 2	(England) Harry Robinson 76.00

=== Knockout stages ===
Quarter-finals (best of 7 sets); 2 January
A1	(England) Phil Taylor (1) 101.85	4
B1	(England) Shayne Burgess 85.42	0
C1	(England) Rod Harrington (5) 94.54	4
D1	(England) Peter Evison (4) 84.34	0
E1	(England) Dennis Priestley (2) 88.10	4
F1	(England) Peter Manley (7) 88.91	3
G1	(England) Keith Deller (6) 79.22	4
H1	(England) Harry Robinson 81.09	1

Semi-finals (best of 9 sets); 3 January
A1	(England) Phil Taylor (1) 103.08	5
C1	(England) Rod Harrington (5) 98.01	2
E1	(England) Dennis Priestley (2) 87.14	5
G1	(England) Keith Deller (6) 79.36	1

Final (best of 11 sets); 4 January
A1	(England) Phil Taylor (1) 103.99	6
E1	(England) Dennis Priestley (2) 90.75	0
Third-place play-off (best of 7 sets)
C1	(England) Rod Harrington (5) 90.00	4
G1	(England) Keith Deller (6) 81.69	1

== Representation from different countries ==
This table shows the number of players by country in the World Championship. Four countries were represented in the World Championship, no more than in the previous championship.

	(England) ENG	(United States) USA	(Canada) CAN	(Scotland) SCO	Total
Final	2	0	0	0	2
Semis	4	0	0	0	4
Quarters	8	0	0	0	8
Group Stages	18	4	1	1	24
