= Gayl King =

Canadian darts player

Personal information
- Born: 2 January 1964 (age 62) Newfoundland and Labrador, Canada
- Home town: Edmonton, Alberta, Canada

Sport
- Sport: Darts
- Playing since: 1981
- Darts: 23 Gram
- Laterality: right-handed
- Prize money: £1,500

Organisation (see split in darts)
- BDO: 1988–2000
- PDC: 2000–2006

WDF major events – best performances
- World Masters: First Round: 2000

PDC premier events – best performances
- World Championship: First Round: (2001)

Other tournament wins
- Tournament: Years
- Ladies Canadian Open Ladies Klondike Open The Main Event Ladies: 2000, 2002, 2003; 2002, 2003; 2003, 2004

Gayl King (born 2 January 1964) is a Canadian former professional darts player. She was the first woman to be invited by the darts organization Professional Darts Corporation (PDC) to complete in the PDC World Darts Championship in the 2001 tournament and was the winner of several regional and national darts competitions in Canada.

== Personal background ==
King was born and raised in a small community in the Canadian province of Newfoundland and Labrador and has fourteen siblings. She has two grown-up sons, and worked as a bookkeeper for a restaurant chain in Edmonton, Alberta prior to her debut in the PDC World Darts Championship.

== Darts career ==
King was introduced to the throwing game of darts by one of her older sisters Mary; her brother-in-law provided her with an instructional book which strengthened her interest in the sport. She made her British Darts Organisation debut in the 1989 World Masters where she was defeated in the preliminary round by Linda Beaver. She finished runner-up to Lillian Skears in the 1995 Klondike Open and repeated the result to Lorraine Colenutt in the 1996 contest. In 1997, King paired with Kim Whaley to win the women's doubles events of the Klondike Open, adding to a success in the tournament's ladies' cricket pairs division with Terry Towey in 1995. Two years later she won the women's singles and the ladies' doubles of the Manitoba Open and the Saskatoon Open ladies' pairs and ladies' cricket pairs with Laurie Court.

King played in the 1997 WDF World Cup Ladies Pairs tournament in Perth, Australia with Patricia Farrell, where the duo lasted until the semi-finals. She also played for the Canadian national women's team. King went on to claim the singles, doubles and the mixed doubles divisions of the 2000 Canadian National Darts Championships, before she followed up with victories in the London Open in the singles and ladies pairs divisions, and that year's Ladies Canadian Open. She took a victory in the ladies cricket pairs and the mixed pairs divisions of the 2000 Klondike Open. King was runner-up to Stacy Bromberg in that year's Windy City Open Ladies and reached the last 64 of the World Ladies Masters. She played in the 2000 BDO World Masters and reached the tournament's first round.

After a PDC World Darts Championship play-off qualification round of eight women players due to be held in conjunction with the 2000 World Grand Prix tournament was cancelled, the Professional Darts Corporation invited her to compete in the 2001 PDC World Darts Championship in Purfleet, Essex; it began in December 2000 and lasted until January 2001 and the PDC council allowed women to compete in the event. It telephoned King and she accepted their invitation. She became the first woman to participate in the PDC world championship. King lost her first round match 3–1 to the world number 29 Graeme Stoddart.

Later in 2001, King reached the last 16 of the WDF World Cup Singles where she was defeated by Francis Hoenselaar. She won the Ladies Canadian Open and the Klondike Open twice more over the next four years in the singles divisions. King also played in the 2004 Las Vegas Desert Classic and had her final two professional matches at the 2005 and 2006 editions of the Vauxhall Open.

== Post-darts career ==
She retired from competitive darts after a shoulder injury caused her to lose the endurance required to play in tournaments. King found employment at a cheese-making company working as an administrative assistant.

== World Championship results ==
=== PDC ===
- 2001: First Round: (lost to Graeme Stoddart 1–3) (sets)
