= 1997 WDC World Darts Championship =

Tournament information
- Dates: 29 December 1996 – 5 January 1997
- Venue: Circus Tavern
- Location: Purfleet
- Country: England
- Organisation(s): PDC (WDC)
- Format: Sets; Final – best of 11
- Prize fund: £99,500
- Winner's share: £45,000
- High checkout: 170; Peter Evison (2x); Steve Raw; Dennis Priestley

Champion(s)
- Phil Taylor

The 1997 WDC World Darts Championship (known for sponsorship reasons as the 1997 Red Band World Darts Championship) was held between 29 December 1996 and 5 January 1997 at the Circus Tavern in Purfleet, Essex. It was the fourth World Championship organised by the World Darts Council, which had acrimoniously split from the British Darts Organisation in 1992–93. As a result of an ongoing legal battle, this would be the last time that the WDC name would be used – an out-of-court settlement (Tomlin Order) in June 1997 meant that the organisation had to change its name to the Professional Darts Corporation (PDC).

Paul Lim, who famously hit a nine dart finish at the 1990 BDO World Darts Championship appeared at his first WDC World Championship – he had only managed to qualify once for the BDO World Championship since the split, losing a second round match to John Part in 1994.

The Championship saw two tight semi-finals, the most memorable of which was the clash between mentor and protégé – Eric Bristow and Phil Taylor. Taylor emerged victorious 5–4 in sets to reach the final. He matched his mentor's feat of five World Championship titles when he beat Dennis Priestley 6–3 in the final. They were now level as the most successful players of all-time.

== Seeds ==
1. (England) Dennis Priestley
2. (England) Phil Taylor
3. (England) Bob Anderson
4. (England) Peter Evison
5. (Scotland) Jamie Harvey
6. (England) Alan Warriner
7. (England) Keith Deller
8. (England) Rod Harrington

== Prize money ==
The prize fund was £99,500.

| Position (num. of players) | | Prize money (Total: £99,500) |
|---|---|---|
| Winner | (1) | £45,000 |
| Runner-Up | (1) | £10,000 |
| Third place | (1) | £5,000 |
| Fourth place | (1) | £4,000 |
| Quarter-finalists | (4) | £3,000 |
| Group stage runners-up | (8) | £1,500 |
| Group stage 3rd place | (8) | £1,250 |
| Highest finish bonus | (1) | £1,500 |

== Results ==
=== Preliminary round ===
A best of five sets preliminary round match took place between the players who were tied on the rankings.

| Av. | Player | Score | Player | Av. |
|---|---|---|---|---|
| 85.89 | Ritchie Gardner (England) | 3 – 1 | (United States) Dave Kelly | 78.20 |
| 90.00 | Paul Lim (United States) | 3 – 2 | (Republic of Ireland) Tom Kirby | 83.00 |
| 95.05 | Chris Mason (England) | 3 – 0 | (England) Peter Manley | 89.10 |
| 101.89 | Gary Mawson (United States) | 3 – 1 | (England) Harry Robinson | 87.33 |
| 75.21 | Graeme Stoddart (England) | 3 – 1 | (England) Paul Knighton | 51.83 |
| 79.44 | Steve Raw (England) | 3 – 2 | (United States) Jason Lucas | 60.10 |
| 93.99 | Dennis Smith (England) | 3 – 0 | (United States) Jerry Umberger | 50.01 |
| 73.45 | Sean Downs (United States) | 3 – 2 | (Canada) Tony Holyoake | 69.47 |

=== Group Stages ===
==== Group A ====
| Pos | Player | P | W | L | SF | SA | +/− | Pts |
|---|---|---|---|---|---|---|---|---|
| 1 | (England) Eric Bristow | 2 | 1 | 1 | 4 | 4 | 0 | 2 |
| 2 | (England) (3) Bob Anderson | 2 | 1 | 1 | 4 | 4 | 0 | 2 |
| 3 | (United States) Gary Mawson | 2 | 1 | 1 | 4 | 4 | 0 | 2 |

Bristow qualified with a higher tournament average.

29 December–1 January

| 85.10 (3) Bob Anderson (England) | 1 – 3 | (England) Eric Bristow 87.47 |
| 80.06 (3) Bob Anderson (England) | 3 – 1 | (United States) Gary Mawson 78.63 |
| 81.17 Eric Bristow (England) | 1 – 3 | (United States) Gary Mawson 80.96 |

==== Group B ====
| Pos | Player | P | W | L | SF | SA | +/− | Pts |
|---|---|---|---|---|---|---|---|---|
| 1 | (England) (6) Alan Warriner | 2 | 2 | 0 | 6 | 2 | +4 | 4 |
| 2 | (England) Graeme Stoddart | 2 | 1 | 1 | 4 | 4 | 0 | 2 |
| 3 | (United States) Larry Butler | 2 | 0 | 2 | 2 | 6 | –4 | 0 |

29 December–1 January

| 86.01 (6) Alan Warriner (England) | 3 – 1 | (United States) Larry Butler 80.73 |
| 87.89 Graeme Stoddart (England) | 3 – 1 | (United States) Larry Butler 80.58 |
| 91.07 (6) Alan Warriner (England) | 3 – 1 | (England) Graeme Stoddart 86.96 |

==== Group C ====
| Pos | Player | P | W | L | SF | SA | +/− | Pts |
|---|---|---|---|---|---|---|---|---|
| 1 | (England) (7) Keith Deller | 2 | 2 | 0 | 6 | 2 | +4 | 4 |
| 2 | (England) Dennis Smith | 2 | 1 | 1 | 5 | 3 | +2 | 2 |
| 3 | (England) Kevin Spiolek | 2 | 0 | 2 | 0 | 6 | −6 | 0 |

29 December–1 January

| 83.49 (7) Keith Deller (England) | 3 – 0 | (England) Kevin Spiolek 75.97 |
| 82.18 Dennis Smith (England) | 3 – 0 | (England) Kevin Spiolek 69.06 |
| 83.79 (7) Keith Deller (England) | 3 – 2 | (England) Dennis Smith 85.71 |

==== Group D ====
| Pos | Player | P | W | L | SF | SA | +/− | Pts |
|---|---|---|---|---|---|---|---|---|
| 1 | (England) (2) Phil Taylor | 2 | 2 | 0 | 6 | 0 | +6 | 4 |
| 2 | (United States) Gerald Verrier | 2 | 1 | 1 | 3 | 4 | −1 | 2 |
| 3 | (England) Chris Mason | 2 | 0 | 2 | 1 | 6 | −5 | 0 |

29 December–1 January

| 90.18 (2) Phil Taylor (England) | 3 – 0 | (England) Chris Mason 79.96 |
| 84.54 Gerald Verrier (United States) | 3 – 1 | (England) Chris Mason 80.04 |
| 87.83 (2) Phil Taylor (England) | 3 – 0 | (United States) Gerald Verrier 76.10 |

==== Group E ====
| Pos | Player | P | W | L | SF | SA | +/− | Pts |
|---|---|---|---|---|---|---|---|---|
| 1 | (England) (4) Peter Evison | 2 | 2 | 0 | 6 | 1 | +5 | 4 |
| 2 | (England) Steve Raw | 2 | 1 | 1 | 4 | 4 | 0 | 2 |
| 3 | (England) Cliff Lazarenko | 2 | 0 | 2 | 1 | 6 | −5 | 0 |

29 December–1 January

| 88.77 (4) Peter Evison (England) | 3 – 1 | (England) Steve Raw 82.07 |
| 81.76 Cliff Lazarenko (England) | 1 – 3 | (England) Steve Raw 78.75 |
| 92.02 (4) Peter Evison (England) | 3 – 0 | (England) Cliff Lazarenko 73.49 |

==== Group F ====
| Pos | Player | P | W | L | SF | SA | +/− | Pts |
|---|---|---|---|---|---|---|---|---|
| 1 | (Scotland) (5) Jamie Harvey | 2 | 2 | 0 | 6 | 4 | +2 | 4 |
| 2 | (England) John Lowe | 2 | 1 | 1 | 5 | 4 | +1 | 2 |
| 3 | (United States) Paul Lim | 2 | 0 | 2 | 3 | 6 | −3 | 0 |

29 December–1 January

| 87.34 (5) Jamie Harvey (Scotland) | 3 – 2 | (United States) Paul Lim 87.75 |
| 83.45 John Lowe (England) | 3 – 1 | (United States) Paul Lim 82.73 |
| 82.00 (5) Jamie Harvey (Scotland) | 3 – 2 | (England) John Lowe 81.18 |

==== Group G ====
| Pos | Player | P | W | L | SF | SA | +/− | Pts |
|---|---|---|---|---|---|---|---|---|
| 1 | (England) (8) Rod Harrington | 2 | 1 | 1 | 5 | 4 | +1 | 2 |
| 2 | (United States) Sean Downs | 2 | 1 | 1 | 4 | 4 | 0 | 2 |
| 3 | (England) Shayne Burgess | 2 | 1 | 1 | 4 | 5 | −1 | 2 |

29 December–1 January

| 85.62 (8) Rod Harrington (England) | 2 – 3 | (England) Shayne Burgess 83.82 |
| 80.54 (8) Rod Harrington (England) | 3 – 1 | (United States) Sean Downs 76.52 |
| 86.76 Shayne Burgess (England) | 1 – 3 | (United States) Sean Downs 82.85 |

==== Group H ====
| Pos | Player | P | W | L | SF | SA | +/− | Pts |
|---|---|---|---|---|---|---|---|---|
| 1 | (England) (1) Dennis Priestley | 2 | 2 | 0 | 6 | 1 | +5 | 4 |
| 2 | (United States) Steve Brown | 2 | 1 | 1 | 3 | 5 | –2 | 2 |
| 3 | (England) Ritchie Gardner | 2 | 0 | 2 | 3 | 6 | −3 | 0 |

29 December–1 January

| 90.98 (1) Dennis Priestley (England) | 3 – 0 | (United States) Steve Brown 84.33 |
| 77.60 Ritchie Gardner (England) | 2 – 3 | (United States) Steve Brown 80.19 |
| 88.41 (1) Dennis Priestley (England) | 3 – 1 | (England) Ritchie Gardner 81.26 |

=== Knockout stages ===
Quarter-finals (best of 9 sets); 2–3 January
A1 | (England) Eric Bristow 85.78 | 5
B1 | (England) Alan Warriner (6) 88.81 | 3
C1 | (England) Keith Deller (7) 87.39 | 1
D1 | (England) Phil Taylor (2) 98.58 | 5
E1 | (England) Peter Evison (4) 91.39 | 5
F1 | (Scotland) Jamie Harvey (5) 83.96 | 3
G1 | (England) Rod Harrington (8) 94.50 | 2
H1 | (England) Dennis Priestley (1) 94.73 | 5

Semi-finals (best of 9 sets); 4 January
A1 | (England) Eric Bristow 86.97 | 4
D1 | (England) Phil Taylor (2) 93.73 | 5
E1 | (England) Peter Evison (4) 91.32 | 4
H1 | (England) Dennis Priestley (1) 94.34 | 5

Final (best of 11 sets); 5 January
D1 | (England) Phil Taylor (2) 100.91 | 6
H1 | (England) Dennis Priestley (1) 96.79 | 3
Third place play-off (best of 7 sets)
A1 | (England) Eric Bristow 83.23 | 2
E1 | (England) Peter Evison (4) 83.25 | 4

== Representation from different countries ==
This table shows the number of players by country in the World Championship. Four countries were represented in the World Championship, one less than in the previous championship.

| | (England) ENG | (United States) USA | (Canada) CAN | (Scotland) SCO | (Republic of Ireland) IRL | Total |
|---|---|---|---|---|---|---|
| Final | 2 | 0 | 0 | 0 | 0 | 2 |
| Semis | 4 | 0 | 0 | 0 | 0 | 4 |
| Quarters | 7 | 0 | 0 | 1 | 0 | 8 |
| Group Stages | 18 | 5 | 1 | 1 | 1 | 26 |
