= Dan Lauby =

American darts player

Personal information
- Nickname: "The Cujo"
- Born: 6 March 1960 (age 66) Terre Haute, Indiana, U.S.

Sport
- Sport: Darts
- Playing since: 1980
- Darts: 25g Target
- Laterality: Right-handed
- Walk-on music: "Jump" by Van Halen

Organisation (see split in darts)
- PDC: 1998–2022

WDF major events – best performances
- World Masters: Last 192: 2001

PDC premier events – best performances
- World Championship: Last 32: 1999, 2000, 2001
- World Matchplay: Last 32: 1999
- US Open/WSoD: Last 32: 2008

Daniel Lauby (sometimes referred to as Dan Lauby Snr; born March 6, 1960) is an American former professional darts player who played in Professional Darts Corporation (PDC) events. His son Danny Lauby Jr. is also a professional darts player.

== Career ==
Lauby played in four PDC World Darts Championships between 1999 and 2004, although he never won a game.

Lauby He made his debut of the 1999 World Matchplay, losing to Jamie Harvey of Scotland 5–10 in the last 32.

== World Championship performances ==
=== PDC ===
- 1999: Last 32: (lost to Mick Manning 1–3) (sets)
- 2000: Last 32: (lost to Graeme Stoddart 2–3)
- 2001: Last 32: (lost to Paul Lim 1–3)
- 2004: Last 48: (lost to Erik Clarys 0–3)
