= 1996 WDC World Darts Championship =

Tournament information
- Dates: 26 December 1995 – 1 January 1996
- Venue: Circus Tavern
- Location: Purfleet
- Country: England
- Organisation(s): PDC (WDC)
- Format: Sets; Final – best of 11
- Prize fund: £62,500
- Winner's share: £14,000
- High checkout: 170; Phil Taylor; Kevin Spiolek

Champion(s)
- Phil Taylor

The 1996 WDC World Darts Championship (known for sponsorship reasons as the 1996 Vernons World Darts Championship) was the third year that the Professional Darts Corporation (then known as the World Darts Council) held their own World Championships following an acrimonious split from the British Darts Organisation during 1992/93. The tournament had its third sponsor in as many years, with Vernons taking over from Proton Cars. The tournament was held at the Circus Tavern in Purfleet between 26 December 1995 and 1 January 1996.

Although he had not officially announced his retirement, Jocky Wilson had played his last televised competitive darts match at the World Matchplay in Blackpool in the summer of 1995, and had walked away from darts suddenly on 23 December 1995, so didn't appear at the 1996 World Championship, with Phil Taylor and Dennis Priestley both making an appeal after their 1996 World Championship final for Jocky and Malvina (Jocky's wife) to return. Nigel Justice and Steve Raw were the two English players making their WDC World Championship debuts.

Phil Taylor defeated Dennis Priestley 6–4 in the final, with Taylor gaining revenge for his 1994 final defeat against Priestley. It was Taylor's fourth overall World Championship victory.

== Seeds ==
1. (England) Phil Taylor
2. (England) Rod Harrington
3. (England) Dennis Priestley
4. (England) John Lowe
5. (England) Peter Evison
6. (England) Alan Warriner
7. (England) Bob Anderson
8. (England) Kevin Spiolek

== Prize money ==
The prize fund was £62,500.

Position (num. of players)		Prize money (Total: £62,500)
Winner	(1)	£14,000
Runner-Up	(1)	£7,000
Semi-finalists	(2)	£4,000
Quarter-finalists	(4)	£2,500
Group stage runners-up	(8)	£1,500
Group stage 3rd place	(8)	£1,250
Highest finish bonus	(1)	£1,500

== Results ==
=== Group stage ===
==== Group A ====
Pos	Player	P	W	L	SF	SA	+/-	Pts
1	(England) (1) Phil Taylor	2	2	0	6	0	+6	4
2	(England) Shayne Burgess	2	1	1	3	4	−1	2
3	(England) Cliff Lazarenko	2	0	2	1	6	−5	0

26 December

91.78 (1) Phil Taylor (England)	3 – 0	(England) Cliff Lazarenko 76.66

27 December

92.07 Shayne Burgess (England)	3 – 1	(England) Cliff Lazarenko 84.02

28 December

100.95 (1) Phil Taylor (England)	3 – 0	(England) Shayne Burgess 85.40

==== Group B ====
Pos	Player	P	W	L	SF	SA	+/-	Pts
1	(England) Keith Deller	2	2	0	6	3	+3	4
2	(United States) Sean Downs	2	1	1	4	3	+1	2
3	(England) (8) Kevin Spiolek	2	0	2	2	6	–4	0

26 December

79.24 (8) Kevin Spiolek (England)	0 – 3	(United States) Sean Downs 85.57

27 December

80.14 (8) Kevin Spiolek (England)	2 – 3	(England) Keith Deller 82.35

28 December

76.77 Sean Downs (United States)	1 – 3	(England) Keith Deller 78.90

==== Group C ====
Pos	Player	P	W	L	SF	SA	+/-	Pts
1	(England) (5) Peter Evison	2	2	0	6	2	+4	4
2	(England) Steve Raw	2	1	1	5	3	+2	2
3	(United States) Gary Mawson	2	0	2	0	6	−6	0

26 December

83.83 (5) Peter Evison (England)	3 – 0	(United States) Gary Mawson 73.34

27 December

78.44 Steve Raw (England)	3 – 0	(United States) Gary Mawson 76.03

28 December

86.10 (5) Peter Evison (England)	3 – 2	(England) Steve Raw 85.44

==== Group D ====
Pos	Player	P	W	L	SF	SA	+/-	Pts
1	(England) (4) John Lowe	2	2	0	6	2	+4	4
2	(England) Dennis Smith	2	1	1	3	4	−1	2
3	(Republic of Ireland) Tom Kirby	2	0	2	3	6	−3	0

26 December

84.41 (4) John Lowe (England)	3 – 0	(England) Dennis Smith 83.66

27 December

76.19 Dennis Smith (England)	3 – 1	(Republic of Ireland) Tom Kirby 83.11

28 December

90.92 (4) John Lowe (England)	3 – 2	(Republic of Ireland) Tom Kirby 86.49

==== Group E ====
Pos	Player	P	W	L	SF	SA	+/-	Pts
1	(United States) Larry Butler	2	2	0	6	4	+2	4
2	(England) (2) Rod Harrington	2	1	1	5	4	+1	2
3	(England) Nigel Justice	2	0	2	3	6	−3	0

26 December

77.10 (2) Rod Harrington (England)	3 – 1	(England) Nigel Justice 71.71

27 December

81.23 Larry Butler (United States)	3 – 2	(England) Nigel Justice 80.25

28 December

81.68 (2) Rod Harrington (England)	2 – 3	(United States) Larry Butler 79.20

==== Group F ====
Pos	Player	P	W	L	SF	SA	+/-	Pts
1	(Scotland) Jamie Harvey	2	2	0	6	4	+2	4
2	(England) (7) Bob Anderson	2	1	1	5	4	+1	2
3	(United States) Gerald Verrier	2	0	2	3	6	−3	0

26 December

83.82 (7) Bob Anderson (England)	2 – 3	(Scotland) Jamie Harvey 83.33

27 December

83.98 (7) Bob Anderson (England)	3 – 1	(United States) Gerald Verrier 78.29

28 December

81.04 Gerald Verrier (United States)	2 – 3	(Scotland) Jamie Harvey 82.71

==== Group G ====
Pos	Player	P	W	L	SF	SA	+/-	Pts
1	(England) (6) Alan Warriner	2	2	0	6	2	+4	4
2	(United States) Steve Brown	2	1	1	3	5	−2	2
3	(England) Graeme Stoddart	2	0	2	4	6	−2	0

26 December

96.08 (6) Alan Warriner (England)	3 – 0	(United States) Steve Brown 87.07

27 December

80.35 Graeme Stoddart (England)	2 – 3	(United States) Steve Brown 80.08

28 December

82.47 (6) Alan Warriner (England)	3 – 2	(England) Graeme Stoddart 80.41

==== Group H ====
Pos	Player	P	W	L	SF	SA	+/-	Pts
1	(England) (3) Dennis Priestley	2	2	0	6	0	+6	4
2	(England) Eric Bristow	2	1	1	3	5	–2	2
3	(England) Ritchie Gardner	2	0	2	2	6	−4	0

26 December

92.85 (3) Dennis Priestley (England)	3 – 0	(England) Eric Bristow 84.23

27 December

80.66 Eric Bristow (England)	3 – 2	(England) Ritchie Gardner 84.59

28 December

86.16 (3) Dennis Priestley (England)	3 – 0	(England) Ritchie Gardner 66.16

=== Knockout stages ===
Quarter-finals (best of 7 sets); 29 December
A1	(England) Phil Taylor (1) 96.01	4
B1	(England) Keith Deller 78.77	0
C1	(England) Peter Evison (5) 82.78	2
D1	(England) John Lowe (4) 85.33	4
E1	(United States) Larry Butler 81.93	0
F1	(Scotland) Jamie Harvey 90.55	4
G1	(England) Alan Warriner (6) 89.99	1
H1	(England) Dennis Priestley (3) 90.56	4

Semi-finals (best of 9 sets); 30 December
A1	(England) Phil Taylor (1) 94.84	5
D1	(England) John Lowe (4) 83.78	1
F1	(Scotland) Jamie Harvey 85.13	1
H1	(England) Dennis Priestley (3) 90.38	5

Final (best of 11 sets); 1 January
A1	(England) Phil Taylor (1) 98.52	6
H1	(England) Dennis Priestley (3) 101.48	4
