= Scott Cummings (darts player) =

Canadian darts player

Personal information
- Nickname: "The Full Monty"
- Born: 3 October 1970 (age 56) Hamilton, Ontario, Canada
- Home town: Hamilton, Ontario, Canada

Sport
- Sport: Darts
- Playing since: 1990
- Darts: 21g 95% Tungsten
- Laterality: Right-handed

Organisation (see split in darts)
- PDC: 1998–2001

PDC premier events – best performances
- World Championship: Last 32: 1999, 2000, 2001
- World Matchplay: Last 32: 1999

Scott Cummings (born 3 October 1970) is a Canadian former professional darts player who played in Professional Darts Corporation (PDC) events.

== Career ==
Cummings played in three PDC World Darts Championships between 1999 and 2001, although he never won a game.

Cummings played in the 1999 World Matchplay, losing in the Last 32 to Colin Lloyd of England 8–10.

== World Championship performances ==
=== PDC ===
- 1999: Last 32: (lost to Shayne Burgess 0–3) (sets)
- 2001: Last 32: (lost to Cliff Lazarenko 0–3)
