= Nigel Justice =

English darts player

Personal information
- Born: 29 August 1956 (age 70) Cippenham, Berkshire, England

Sport
- Sport: Darts
- Playing since: 1979
- Darts: 26g
- Laterality: Right-handed

Organisation (see split in darts)
- BDO: 1990–1994
- PDC: 1994–2003

PDC premier events – best performances
- World Championship: Last 16: 2000
- World Matchplay: Quarter-Finals: 1995
- UK Open: Last 128: 2003

Nigel Justice (born 29 August 1956) is an English former professional darts player who played in Professional Darts Corporation (PDC) events.

== Career ==
Justice played in three PDC World Darts Championships between 1996 and 2001, with his best run being to the last 16 in 2000, before losing to Shayne Burgess. He also reached the quarter-finals of the 1995 World Matchplay after beating Jef Scheyltjens and Jocky Wilson. He lost to Cliff Lazarenko.

Justice qualified for the 2003 UK Open, but lost 5-1 in legs during the first round to Norman Fletcher.

He quit the PDC in 2003.

== World Championship performances ==
=== PDC ===
- 1996: Last 24 group: (lost to Larry Butler 2–3 and lost to Rod Harrington 0–3)
- 2000: Last 16: (lost to Shayne Burgess 0–3)
- 2001: Last 32: (lost to Phil Taylor 0–3)
