= Keith Deller =

English darts player (born 1959)

Keith Deller MBE
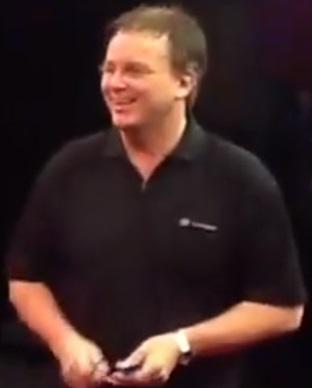
- Deller in 2011

Personal information
- Full name: Keith Noel Deller
- Nicknames: "The Fella" "Milky Bar Kid" "The Delboy"
- Born: 24 December 1959 (age 66) Ipswich, England
- Home town: Icklingham, England

Sport
- Sport: Darts
- Playing since: 1972
- Darts: 23g Loxley
- Laterality: Right-handed
- Walk-on music: "Things Can Only Get Better" by D Ream

Organisation (see split in darts)
- BDO: 1983–1993
- PDC: 1993–2007 (founding member)

WDF major events – best performances
- World Championship: Winner (1): 1983
- World Masters: Runner-up: 1984

PDC premier events – best performances
- World Championship: Semi-final: 1998
- World Matchplay: Semi-final: 1998
- World Grand Prix: Quarter-final: 1999
- UK Open: Last 32: 2006

WSDT major events – best performances
- World Championship: Last 16: 2022, 2023
- World Matchplay: Last 20: 2022
- World Masters: Quarter-final: 2022

Other tournament wins
- Years
Double Diamond Masters	1983
Unipart British Professional	1987
WDF World Cup – Team	1983
Nations Cup – Team	1984
PDC Eastbourne Open	2001
Eastbourne Pro	2001
- Updated on 12 April 2019

Keith Deller (born 24 December 1959) is an English former professional darts player best known for winning the 1983 BDO World Darts Championship. He also won the British Professional Championship in 1987.

He was the first qualifier to win the World Darts Championship and remains one of the youngest champions in history. For his World Championship win, Deller used 18-gram spring-loaded darts, later banned for tournament play but now legal again.

== Career ==
=== BDO ===
Deller's victory over Eric Bristow in the 1983 BDO World Darts Championship by six sets to five was probably the biggest upset in the history of the championship. He had also beaten world number three John Lowe in the quarter-finals and defending champion and world number two Jocky Wilson in the semi-final, to become the only player in history to defeat the world's top three ranked players in the World Championship. The tabloid headlines the following day were "Killed Three", an anagram of his name. The champion's prize money in 1983 was £8,000.

His checkout of 138 to clinch the trophy is amongst the most memorable in darting history. Bristow had left himself 50 to stay in the match, but decided to throw for single 18 with his last dart to leave double 16 instead of a more difficult attempt at the bullseye. Deller then hit treble 20, treble 18, double 12 for the title, and even to this day commentators often refer to 138 as the "Deller checkout" if a player is left with that score.

Despite a meteoric rise to world champion, his career results failed to maintain that level. On the defence of his world title, he lost in the first round to Nicky Virachkul, and he only won three further matches in the BDO World Championship in subsequent years. He did win the British Professional Championship in 1987, but generally his world ranking continued to fall, and he failed to qualify for the World Championship between 1989 and 1993. One of his more notable achievements in the years following his world title win is his 100.30 average in his quarter-final match against John Lowe in the 1985 World Championship; this made him the first-ever player to record a three-figure average in a BDO world championship match.

=== PDC ===
Deller was one of the players who broke away from the British Darts Organisation in 1992 and joined the WDC, now the PDC. This saw him gain some more television exposure, and he did produce a few resurgent performances to reach the semi-finals of the 1998 PDC World Championship and also the semi-finals of the 1998 PDC World Matchplay. Deller dropped out of the top 32 of the PDC's World Rankings around 2005 and therefore had to attempt qualification for their major tournaments – which he failed to do for the 2006, 2007 and 2008 PDC World Championships.

== Records ==
Deller's name has been in the record books on a couple of occasions. He held the Guinness World Record for the fastest three legs of 301 in 97 seconds. On 13 October 1984 he was on the wrong end of a piece of darting history when Lowe hit the first-ever televised nine-dart finish against him in the quarter-finals of the MFI World Matchplay. He became the first player to achieve a match average of 100 in a BDO World Championship match.

On 7 August 2012, Deller recorded a 25-second 301, checking out 130 on the bullseye for a new world record time. This beat the record of 33 seconds by Dean Gould, recorded earlier on the same day at the same venue, the Olympia Great British Beer Festival.

== Spotter ==
Deller has for many years been part of the Sky Sports broadcasting team acting as a "spotter" for the cameras. His knowledge of the players and scoring shots helps the director and camera operators to anticipate where the next dart will be thrown.

== Personal life ==
Deller supports his local football club, Ipswich Town. He lives with his wife Kim and has two children.

He was appointed Member of the Order of the British Empire (MBE) in the 2024 New Year Honours, having raised large sums of money for various charities, including over £500,000 for Macmillan Cancer Support.

== World Championship performances ==
=== BDO ===
Deller's BDO results are as follows:

- 1983: Winner (beat Eric Bristow 6–5)
- 1984: First round (lost to Nicky Virachkul 1–2)
- 1985: Quarter-final (lost to John Lowe 2–4)
- 1986: Second round (lost to Alan Glazier 1–3)
- 1987: First round (lost to Brian Cairns 0–3)
- 1988: First round (lost to John Lowe 1–3)

=== PDC ===
Deller's PDC results are as follows:

- 1994: Group Stage (lost to Steve Brown 1–3 and Kevin Spiolek 1–3)
- 1995: Group Stage (lost to Larry Butler 2–3 and Kevin Spiolek 1–3)
- 1996: Quarter-finals (lost to Phil Taylor 0–4)
- 1997: Quarter-finals (lost to Phil Taylor 1–5)
- 1998: Semi-finals (lost to Dennis Priestley 1–5 and lost the third place match to Rod Harrington 1–4)
- 1999: First round (lost to Bob Anderson 2–3)
- 2000: Second round (lost to John Lowe 1–3)
- 2001: Quarter-finals (lost to Phil Taylor 0–4)
- 2002: First round (lost to Rod Harrington 3–4)
- 2003: Second round (lost to Richie Burnett 3–4)
- 2004: Fourth round (lost to Peter Manley 2–4)
- 2005: Second round (lost to Wayne Jones 1–3)

=== WSDT ===
Deller's WSDT results are as follows:

- 2022: Second round (lost to Larry Butler 2–3)
- 2023: Second round (lost to Neil Duff 0–3)
- 2024: First round (lost to Richie Burnett 1–3)

== Career finals ==
=== BDO major finals: 5 (2 titles) ===
Legend
World Championship (1–0)
Winmau World Masters (0–1)
British Professional Championship (1–0)
British Matchplay (0–2)

Outcome	No.	Year	Championship	Opponent in the final	Score (Note: (l) = score in legs, (s) = score in sets.)
Winner	1.	1983	World Darts Championship	(England) Eric Bristow	6–5 (s)
Runner-up	1.	1983	British Matchplay	(England) Eric Bristow	2–3 (s)
Runner-up	2.	1984	Winmau World Masters	(England) Eric Bristow	1–3 (s)
Runner-up	3.	1984	British Matchplay	(England) Mike Gregory	2–3 (s)
Winner	2.	1987	British Professional Championship	(England) Leighton Rees	7–5 (s)

== Performance timeline ==
Deller's performance timeline is as follows:

BDO

Tournament	1983	1984	1985	1986	1987	1988
BDO World Championship	W	1R	QF	2R	1R	1R
Winmau World Masters	4R	F	3R	3R	3R	2R
British Matchplay	F	F	SF	DNP		
British Professional Championship	1R	2R	2R	SF	W	QF
Butlins Grand Masters	1R	DNP	QF	1R	Not held	
MFI World Matchplay	NH	QF	1R	1R	SF	1R

WDF majors performances
Tournament	Event	World Cup 1983
WDF World Cup & WDF Europe Cup	Singles	QF
WDF World Cup & WDF Europe Cup	Pairs	QF
WDF World Cup & WDF Europe Cup	Team	W
WDF World Cup & WDF Europe Cup	Overall	W

PDC

Tournament	1994	1995	1996	1997	1998	1999	2000	2001	2002	2003	2004	2005	2006	2007
PDC World Championship	RR	RR	QF	QF	SF	1R	2R	QF	1R	2R	4R	2R	DNQ	
World Matchplay	2R	QF	1R	1R	SF	1R	1R	1R	QF	2R	1R	1R	DNQ	
World Grand Prix	Not held				1R	QF	2R	2R	1R	2R	Did not qualify			
UK Open	Not held									3R	2R	3R	4R	3R

Performance Table Legend
W	Won the tournament	F	Finalist	SF	Semifinalist	QF	Quarterfinalist	#R; RR; Prel.	Lost in # round Round-robin; Preliminary round	DQ	Disqualified
DNQ	Did not qualify	DNP	Did not participate	WD	Withdrew	NH	Tournament not held	#R; RR; Prel.	Lost in # round Round-robin; Preliminary round	NYF	Not yet founded
