= Rod Harrington =

English darts player (born 1957)

Personal information
- Full name: Rodney Kenneth Harrington
- Nickname: The Prince of Style
- Born: 30 December 1957 (age 68) Boreham, Essex, England
- Home town: Chelmsford, Essex, England

Sport
- Sport: Darts
- Playing since: 1977
- Darts: Durro Rod Harrington 21 gram
- Laterality: Right-handed
- Walk-on music: "Sharp Dressed Man" by ZZ Top

Organisation (see split in darts)
- BDO: 1987–1993
- PDC: 1993–2007 (Founding Member)

WDF major events – best performances
- World Championship: Quarter Final: 1992
- World Masters: Winner (1) 1991

PDC premier events – best performances
- World Championship: Runner Up: 1995
- World Matchplay: Winner (2) 1998, 1999
- World Grand Prix: Runner Up: 1998
- UK Open: Last 96: 2003, 2005

Other tournament wins
- Years
| Austrian Open | 1992 |
| Belgium Open | 1991, 1992 |
| British Gold Cup | 1990 |
| Calgary Golden Harvest | 1998 |
| Cleveland Darts Extravaganza | 1993 |
| Denmark Open | 1991, 1992, 1998 |
| Double Diamond Masters | 1987 |
| French Open | 1991, 1993 |
| Golden Harvest North American Cup | 1997, 1998, 1999 |
| Jersey Festival of Darts | 1992 |
| Malta Open | 1991 |
| Swedish Open | 1991 |
| Swiss Open | 1998 |
| Windy City Open | 1992 |

Other achievements
- PDC World Number 1 (Apr 1995 to Aug 1996), (Aug 1998 to Aug 2000)
- Updated on 27 December 2018

Rodney Kenneth Harrington (born 30 December 1957) is an English former professional darts player and commentator. He used the nickname "The Prince of Style" for his matches, often wearing a suit and waistcoat for his games. Harrington enjoyed some major success during his professional career including the prestigious Winmau World Masters in 1991 and two successive World Matchplays in 1998 and 1999. At the PDC Awards Dinner held in January 2019, Harrington was inducted into the PDC Hall of Fame.

== Darts career ==
=== BDO career ===
He started his career before the game split into two separate organisations during the early 1990s. He accumulated many Open tournament titles including the Belgian Open (1991, 1992), Denmark Open (1991, 1992), French Open (1991, 1993) and the Swedish Open (1991). Harrington's 1991 Winmau World Masters victory over Phil Taylor remains one of Taylor's rare major final defeats – although Taylor was only a one-time World Champion at the time and had lost his world crown to Dennis Priestley in January 1991.

Harrington made his World Championship debut in 1992, reaching the quarter-finals before losing to eventual runner-up Mike Gregory. At the 1993 World Championship, Harrington was seeded fourth but lost 2–3 to Wayne Weening in the first round. After those championships, the majority of the top players left the governing body, the British Darts Organisation, to form the WDC (now PDC) in an acrimonious split in the game.

=== PDC career ===
After the WDC/PDC started their own World Championship in 1994, Harrington would be ever-present in the event for the first ten years. He reached the quarter-finals in the inaugural tournament, but his best ever achievement came in the 1995 World Championship – by reaching the final. He lost the final 2–6 to Taylor, who was winning the third of his world championship titles at the time.

He reached the World semi-finals on two further occasions, 1998 (where he was beaten by that year's eventual winner, Taylor) and 2001 (where he lost to that year's runner-up, John Part) and the quarter-finals in 1997. However, after the 2002 World Championship (where he was seeded third), his form slumped dramatically to the point where he was outside the top 16 by 2003 – and a first round defeat by Alan Warriner would turn out to be his last appearance in the World Championship.

He did have some success at the other major PDC tournaments. In 1998, he beat Ronnie Baxter in the final of the World Matchplay, helped along the way by his now famous 125 checkout (Treble 15, Double 20, Double 20); he then successfully defended the title in 1999 with a victory over Peter Manley. He and Phil Taylor remained the only players to retain a major PDC title until Raymond van Barneveld retained his UK Open title in 2007. Harrington also reached the final of the first World Grand Prix event in 1998 losing to Taylor. Along with Richie Burnett he also reached the final of the PDC World Pairs tournament in 1997, losing in the final to the pairing of van Barneveld and Roland Scholten.

=== Final years ===
After three knee operations in the first half of 2001, Harrington's form dropped dramatically, although he never officially announced a retirement from the game. He still attempted to qualify for the major UK tournaments until the 2007 World Championship – where he lost in the first qualifying round. Harrington retired from professional darts in 2007.

Harrington became a director of the PDC and later regularly acted in the capacity of a commentator and analyst on Sky Sports' live darts coverage. He retired from Sky and the PDC in 2022. At one time, he was also the manager of former PDC world number one Colin Lloyd.

== Personal life ==
Harrington is married to Dawn and has three children: Victoria, Curtis, and Ryan. His son Ryan (born 1990) is a darts player on the PDC circuit.

== World Championship results ==
=== BDO ===
- 1992: Quarter-finals (lost to Mike Gregory 3–4)
- 1993: 1st round (lost to Wayne Weening 2–3)

=== PDC ===
- 1994: Quarter-finals (lost to Peter Evison 1–4)
- 1995: Runner-up (lost to Phil Taylor 2–6)
- 1996: Group stage (beat Nigel Justice 3–0, lost to Larry Butler 2–3)
- 1997: Quarter-finals (lost to Dennis Priestley 2–5)
- 1998: Semi-finals (lost to Phil Taylor 2–5), (beat Keith Deller for third place 4–1)
- 1999: 2nd round (lost to Shayne Burgess 1–3)
- 2000: 1st round (lost to John Lowe 2–3)
- 2001: Semi-finals (lost to John Part 5–6)
- 2002: 2nd round (lost to Dennis Priestley 3–6)
- 2003: 2nd round (lost to Alan Warriner-Little 2–4)

== Career finals ==
=== BDO major finals: 1 (1 title) ===
| Outcome | No. | Year | Championship | Opponent in the final | Score |
|---|---|---|---|---|---|
| Winner | 1. | 1991 | Winmau World Masters | (England) Phil Taylor | 3–2 (s) |

=== PDC major finals: 4 (2 titles) ===
Legend
World Championship (0–1)
World Matchplay (2–0)
World Grand Prix (0–1)

| Outcome | No. | Year | Championship | Opponent in the final | Score |
|---|---|---|---|---|---|
| Runner-up | 1. | 1995 | World Championship | Phil Taylor | 2–6 (s) |
| Winner | 1. | 1998 | World Matchplay | Ronnie Baxter | 19–17 (l) |
| Runner-up | 2. | 1998 | World Grand Prix | Phil Taylor | 8–13 (s) |
| Winner | 2. | 1999 | World Matchplay (2) | Peter Manley | 19–17 (l) |

== Performance timeline ==
| Tournament | 1990 | 1991 | 1992 | 1993 | 1994 | 1995 | 1996 | 1997 | 1998 | 1999 | 2000 | 2001 | 2002 | 2003 | 2004 | 2005 |
|---|---|---|---|---|---|---|---|---|---|---|---|---|---|---|---|---|
| BDO World Championship | DNP | | QF | 1R | No longer a BDO Member | | | | | | | | | | | |
| Winmau World Masters | 4R | W | 3R | DNP | | | | | 1R | DNP | | | | | | |
| PDC World Championship | Not yet founded | | | | QF | F | RR | QF | SF | 2R | 1R | SF | 2R | 2R | DNQ | |
| World Matchplay | Not held | | | | SF | 1R | QF | SF | W | W | QF | 1R | 1R | DNQ | | |
| World Grand Prix | Not held | | | | | | | | F | SF | 2R | 1R | 2R | DNQ | | |
| UK Open | Not held | | | | | | | | | | | | | 2R | 1R | 3R |

Performance Table Legend
| W | Won the tournament | F | Finalist | SF | Semifinalist | QF | Quarterfinalist | #R; RR; Prel. | Lost in # round Round-robin; Preliminary round | DQ | Disqualified |
| DNQ | Did not qualify | DNP | Did not participate | WD | Withdrew | NH | Tournament not held | #R; RR; Prel. | Lost in # round Round-robin; Preliminary round | NYF | Not yet founded |

Sporting positions
| Preceded by Dennis Priestley; Alan Warriner | PDC World Number One; 10 April 1995 – August 1996; 1 August 1998 – 29 July 2000 | Succeeded by Phil Taylor; Phil Taylor |
