= Peter Evison =

English darts player (born 1964)

Personal information
- Nickname: "The Fen Tiger"
- Born: 27 May 1964 (age 62) Chiswick, London, England
- Home town: West Drayton, Middlesex, England

Sport
- Sport: Darts
- Playing since: 1980s
- Darts: 22g B&W Signature
- Laterality: Right-handed
- Walk-on music: "Eye of the Tiger" by Survivor

Organisation (see split in darts)
- BDO: 1985–1993, 2008–2011
- PDC: 1993–2007, 2011–2018

WDF major events – best performances
- World Championship: Quarter-final: 1988, 1989
- World Masters: Winner (1) 1989

PDC premier events – best performances
- World Championship: Semi-final: 1994 (4th), 1995 (4th), 1997 (3rd)
- World Matchplay: Winner (1) 1996
- World Grand Prix: Semi-final: 2002
- UK Open: Last 16: 2004

WSDT major events – best performances
- World Matchplay: Last 16: 2022

Other tournament wins
- Tournament: Years
- Finnish Open French Open German Open Norway Open PDC Samson Darts Classic Swiss Open: 1988; 1997, 1999; 1992, 1993; 1991, 1992; 1994 1987

Peter Evison (born 27 May 1964) is an English former professional darts player who competed in Professional Darts Corporation (PDC) and British Darts Organisation (BDO) events. Nicknamed the Fen Tiger, his greatest achievements were winning the 1989 World Masters and the 1996 World Matchplay.

== Darts career ==
=== BDO ===
Before appearing in a major tournament, Evison was a contestant on Bullseye. He, along with his teammate, failed however, to get to Bully's prize board. Evison later appeared on the show in which he scored 300 points on the "Pounds for points" charity round. Evison appeared on the show again in 1989, scoring 323 points in 9 darts in the "Pounds for points" round. He appeared again one more time where he scored 306.

Evison burst on the darts scene in 1986 with a surprise victory over John Lowe in the British Professional Championship, a major televised tournament in that era.

Evison made his World Championship debut in 1988, and went on to reach the quarter-finals, before losing to the eventual champion, Bob Anderson. Evison returned to the same stage the following year, only to be defeated by Eric Bristow in a close quarter-final match. Evison avenged this defeat in the final of the prestigious Winmau World Masters later in 1989, to take the title. However, 1989 was the year of the big slump in darts' television coverage and prize money. As a result, Evison's 1989 World Masters win was not televised, and he received only half of the prize money that the 1988 World Masters champion, Bob Anderson, had received for winning the tournament the year before Evison. Evison was one of the tournament favourites to win the 1990 World Championship. However, despite hitting a 170 checkout, Evison was beaten in the first round by Jack McKenna.

=== PDC ===
Evison was one of the top players who left the British Darts Organisation to form the World Darts Council (now the Professional Darts Corporation, PDC). Evison reached the semi-final of the inaugural 1994 PDC World Darts Championship losing to eventual champion, Dennis Priestley.

Rod Harrington halted him in the semi-final of the 1995 PDC World Darts Championship. A quarter-final defeat followed in 1996, before he reached (and lost) his third semi-final in the 1997 PDC World Darts Championship. There was a third-placed play-off in that year and he beat Eric Bristow to finish third. Evison also got to the quarter-finals of the 1998 PDC World Darts Championship, losing to Harrington.

Evison reached the quarter-finals again in 2000 – losing this time to Peter Manley.

Evison's best performances in the PDC came during the week in which he won the 1996 World Matchplay. He beat the defending champion, Phil Taylor, 8–1 in the second round, and beat Dennis Priestley 16–14 in the final to clinch the title, averaging over 100 in both matches. The defence of his title the following year ended with a quarter-final loss to Richie Burnett. He had further quarter-final appearances in 1999 and 2003, but he also suffered a humiliating 10–0 whitewash in the 2004 World Matchplay to Ronnie Baxter which was his last appearance in Blackpool.

Evison also reached the semi-final of the 2002 World Grand Prix but lost 0–6 to Phil Taylor.

In 2008, it was announced that Evison was one of eight players to take part in the BetFred League of Legends alongside the likes of Bristow, Bobby George and Lowe. He would go on to reach the semi-finals of the tournament. It was also announced that Evison had re-joined the BDO system, becoming one of only a handful of players to return to the BDO after switching to the rival PDC.

== World Championship results ==
=== BDO ===
- 1988: Quarter-finals (lost to Bob Anderson 0–4) (sets)
- 1989: Quarter-finals (lost to Eric Bristow 3–4)
- 1990: 1st round (lost to Jack McKenna 1–3)
- 1991: 2nd round (lost to Kevin Kenny 1–3)
- 1992: 1st round (lost to Keith Sullivan 1–3)

=== PDC ===
- 1994: Semi-finals (lost to Dennis Priestley 3–5)
- 1995: Semi-finals (lost to Rod Harrington 1–5)
- 1996: Quarter-finals (lost to John Lowe 2–4)
- 1997: Semi-finals (lost to Dennis Priestley 4–5)
- 1998: Quarter-finals (lost to Rod Harrington 0–4)
- 1999: 1st round (lost to Dennis Smith 0–3)
- 2000: Quarter-finals (lost to Peter Manley 1–5)
- 2001: 1st round (lost to Dennis Smith 0–3)
- 2002: 1st round (lost to Richie Burnett 1–4)
- 2003: 2nd round (lost to Wayne Mardle 3–4)
- 2004: 3rd round (lost to Colin Lloyd 1–4)
- 2005: 3rd round (lost to Andy Jenkins 0–4)

== Career finals ==
=== BDO major finals: 1 (1 title) ===
Outcome	No.	Year	Championship	Opponent in the final	Score
Winner	1.	1989	World Masters	(England) Eric Bristow	3–2 (s)

=== PDC major finals: 1 (1 title) ===
Outcome	No.	Year	Championship	Opponent in the final	Score
Winner	1.	1996	World Matchplay	Dennis Priestley	16–14 (l)

=== Independent major finals: 1 (1 runner-up) ===
Outcome	No.	Year	Championship	Opponent in the final	Score
Runner-up	1.	1987	News of the World Championship	(England) Mike Gregory	0–2 (l)

== Performance timeline ==
=== BDO ===
Tournament	1986	1987	1988	1989	1990	1991	1992	1997	1999	2009	2010	2011
BDO World Championship	DNQ		QF	QF	1R	2R	1R	PDC		Did not qualify		
World Masters	1R	DNQ	SF	W	1R	2R	4R	2R	1R	3R	2R	1R
British Matchplay	DNP		SF	DNP	QF	Did not participate			Not held			
British Professional	2R	QF	1R	Not held								
MFI World Matchplay	DNQ		SF	Not held								
News of the World	???	F	???		QF	NH		DNP	Not held			

=== PDC ===
Tournament	1994	1995	1996	1997	1998	1999	2000	2001	2002	2003	2004	2005
PDC World Championship	SF	SF	QF	SF	QF	1R	QF	1R	1R	2R	3R	3R
World Matchplay	1R	2R	W	QF	1R	QF	1R	1R	1R	QF	1R	DNP
World Grand Prix	Not yet founded				1R	QF	2R	1R	SF	1R	1R	DNP
UK Open	Not held									3R	5R	3R

Performance Table Legend
W	Won the tournament	F	Finalist	SF	Semifinalist	QF	Quarterfinalist	#R; RR; Prel.	Lost in # round Round-robin; Preliminary round	DQ	Disqualified
DNQ	Did not qualify	DNP	Did not participate	WD	Withdrew	NH	Tournament not held	#R; RR; Prel.	Lost in # round Round-robin; Preliminary round	NYF	Not yet founded
