= Graeme Stoddart =

English darts player

Personal information
- Nickname: "Shark"
- Born: 30 July 1959 (age 67) Newcastle, England
- Home town: Newcastle, England

Sport
- Sport: Darts
- Playing since: 1975
- Darts: 15g Copper Tungsten
- Laterality: Right-handed
- Walk-on music: "Fog on the Tyne" by Paul Gascoigne

Organisation (see split in darts)
- BDO: 1983–1994
- PDC: 1994–2013

WDF major events – best performances
- World Masters: Last 64: 1984

PDC premier events – best performances
- World Championship: Last 16: 1999, 2000, 2001
- World Matchplay: Last 16: 1994, 1996
- World Grand Prix: Quarter Finals: 1998
- UK Open: Last 32: 2006

Other tournament wins
- Tournament: Years
- Amsterdam Open: 2003

Graeme Stoddart (born 30 July 1959) is an English former professional darts player who played in Professional Darts Corporation (PDC) events. His nickname was Shark.

== Career ==
Stoddart represented Holland in the 1984 European Cup. He came to prominence after being invited from the WDC rankings for the inaugural WDC World Darts Championship in 1994. He was drawn in Group 8, where he defeated Jocky Wilson, before being knocked out in the final group match by the eventual champion, Dennis Priestley.

He entered many majors in the early years of the WDC/PDC, eventually reaching the quarter-finals of the 1998 World Grand Prix, beating Paul Lim, and where he lost to Rod Harrington. He hit a 9-dart finish in the Swiss Open in 2000 (with a set of borrowed darts after leaving his set at home), which was the 2nd recorded in the PDC, after Ronnie Baxter had hit the first in the 1999 Antwerp Open. In 2001, history was created: it was the first year a lady, Gayl King from Canada, entered the WC; she lost 1–3 against Stoddart.

Stoddart won the 2003 Amsterdam Open defeating Bert Vlaardingerbroek of Netherlands.

His last appearance at a PDC event was at a Players Championship event in Scotland in 2009. Stoddart retired from the PDC in 2013 for health reasons.

== World Championship results ==
=== PDC ===
- 1994: Last 24 Group (beat Jocky Wilson 3–1 & lost to Dennis Priestley 0–3) (sets)
- 1995: Last 24 Group (lost to Peter Evison 2–3 & lost to Cliff Lazarenko 2–3)
- 1996: Last 24 Group (lost to Alan Warriner-Little 2–3 & lost to Steve Brown 2–3)
- 1997: Last 24 Group (lost to Alan Warriner-Little 2–3 & beat Larry Butler 3–1)
- 1998: Last 24 Group (lost to Keith Deller 1–3 & beat Mick Manning 3–0)
- 1999: 2nd Round (lost to Peter Manley 0–3)
- 2000: 2nd Round (lost to Phil Taylor 0–3)
- 2001: 2nd Round (lost to Rod Harrington 0–3)
