= Shayne Burgess =

English darts player (born 1964)

Personal information
- Nickname: "The Bulldog"
- Born: 1 June 1964 (age 62) Hastings, East Sussex, England
- Home town: Hastings, East Sussex, England

Sport
- Sport: Darts
- Playing since: 1978
- Darts: 19 gm Elven
- Laterality: Right-handed
- Walk-on music: "Blockbuster" The Sweet

Organisation (see split in darts)
- BDO: 1988–1994, 2012–2014
- PDC: 1994–2008, 2018

WDF major events – best performances
- World Championship: Last 32: 1994
- World Masters: Quarter-final: 1993

PDC premier events – best performances
- World Championship: Semi-final: 1999
- World Matchplay: 3rd Place: 1994
- World Grand Prix: Runner-up: 1999, 2000
- UK Open: Runner-up: 2003

Other tournament wins
- Tournament: Years
- BDO Gold Cup Pacific Masters Witch City Open Ireland Spring Classic German Open N.Ireland Open: 1993; 1993; 1998; 1999, 2000; 2000; 2000

Other achievements
- Nine dart finish at Eastbourne Open, 2001
- Updated on 16 April 2019

Shayne Burgess (born 1 June 1964) is an English former professional darts player who competed in Professional Darts Corporation (PDC) tournaments. He is known for his unorthodox throwing action, where he draws the point of the dart up close to his eyeball before releasing.

== Career ==
=== Early career ===
Burgess reached the quarter-finals of the British Open in 1992 and the quarter-finals of the Winmau World Masters in 1993. Burgess switched to the PDC (then known as the WDC), and reached the semi-finals of the 1994 World Matchplay in his first televised event in the WDC.

=== Peak years ===
He reached the semi-finals of the 1999 PDC World Championship, when he lost a 4–5 in to Peter Manley, and the quarter-finals of the 2000 PDC World Championship. Burgess also finished as runner-up in both the 1999 and 2000 World Grand Prixs, losing to Phil Taylor in both finals.

Aside from achieving a 9-dart finish at the Eastbourne Pro event in February 2001, Burgess' form declined for a couple of years after his 1998–2000 peak. However, Burgess then suddenly reached the final of the inaugural UK Open in 2003, again losing to Taylor.

=== Career after the PDC ===
In 2008, after years of a big decline in his form, Burgess left the PDC circuit. In 2011, Burgess was playing on the BDO circuit, and he hit the second 9-dart finish of his career in September 2012, during a Sussex Super League game. Burgess continues to play for the Hastings team of the Sussex Superleague's East Division, along with fellow former PDC player Adrian Gray.

Burgess attempted to gain qualification to the 2018 UK Open beating players like Ricky Evans and Terry Jenkins in the qualifying stages despite not gaining qualification. He also has played in the Modus Super Series and World Seniors Darts Tour.

== World Championship Results ==
=== BDO ===
- 1994: 1st round (lost to Steve McCollum 0–3)

=== PDC ===
- 1995: Last 24 group (lost to Eric Bristow 0–3 and lost to Rod Harrington 2–3)
- 1996: Last 24 group (lost to Phil Taylor 0–3 and beat Cliff Lazarenko 3–1)
- 1997: Last 24 group (beat Rod Harrington 3–2 and lost to Sean Downs 1–3)
- 1998: Quarter-final (lost to Phil Taylor 0–4)
- 1999: Semi-final (lost to Peter Manley 4–5)
- 2000: Quarter-final (lost to Dennis Priestley 4–5)
- 2001: 1st round (lost to Roland Scholten 0–3)
- 2002: 2nd round (lost to Phil Taylor 1–6)
- 2003: 2nd round (lost to Roland Scholten 1–4)

== Career finals ==
=== PDC major finals: 3 (3 runners-up) ===
Legend
World Grand Prix (0–2)
UK Open (0–1)

Outcome	No.	Year	Championship	Opponent in the final	Score
Runner-up	1.	1999	World Grand Prix	Phil Taylor	1–6 (s)
Runner-up	2.	2000	World Grand Prix (2)	Phil Taylor	1–6 (s)
Runner-up	3.	2003	UK Open	Phil Taylor	8–18 (l)

== Performance timeline ==
Tournament	1992	1993	1994	1995	1996	1997	1998	1999	2000	2001	2002	2003	2004	2005	2006	2007	2008	2009	2010	2011	2012	2013	2014
BDO World Championship	DNQ		L32	No longer a BDO Member																		DNQ	
Winmau World Masters	L32	QF	DNP						L32	DNP											L272	DNP	L32
PDC World Championship	NYF		DNP	L24G	L24G	L24G	QF	SF	QF	L32	L16	L32	DNP										
World Matchplay	NYF		SF	L16	L32	L16	L32	QF	L16	L32	L32	DNP											
World Grand Prix	Not yet founded						SF	RU	RU	L16	DNQ	DNP											
UK Open	Not held											RU	L128	DNP	L96	DNP					L128	DNP	
News of the World	Not held					L32	Not held																

Performance Table Legend
DNP	Did not play at the event	DNQ	Did not qualify for the event	NYF	Not yet founded	L#	lost in the early rounds of the tournament (WR = Wildcard round, RR = Round robin)
QF	lost in the quarter-finals	SF	lost in the semi-finals	RU	lost in the final	W	won the tournament
