= Circus Tavern =

Entertainment venue in Purfleet, England

Coordinates: 51.4859°N 0.2461°E

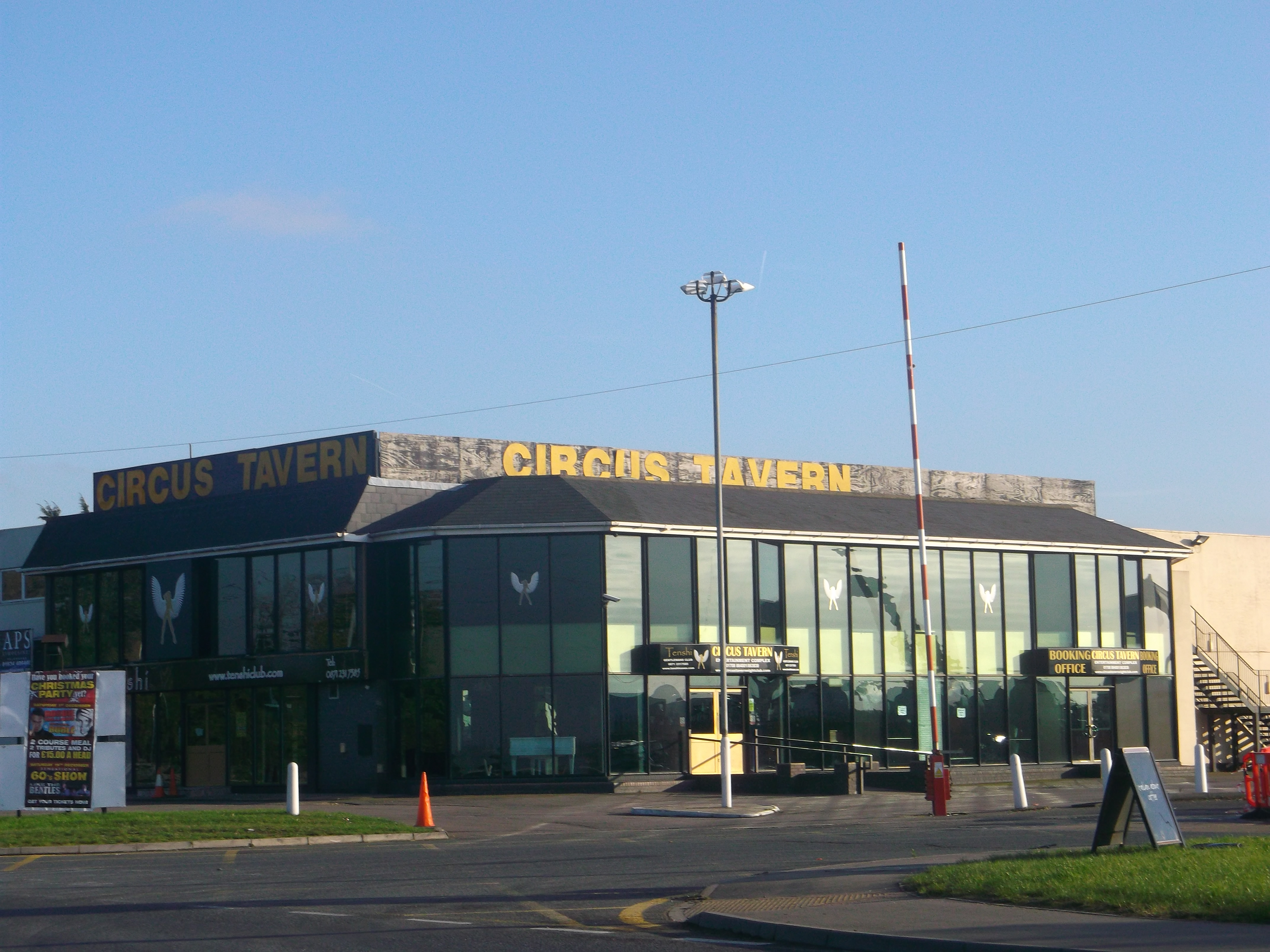
The Circus Tavern

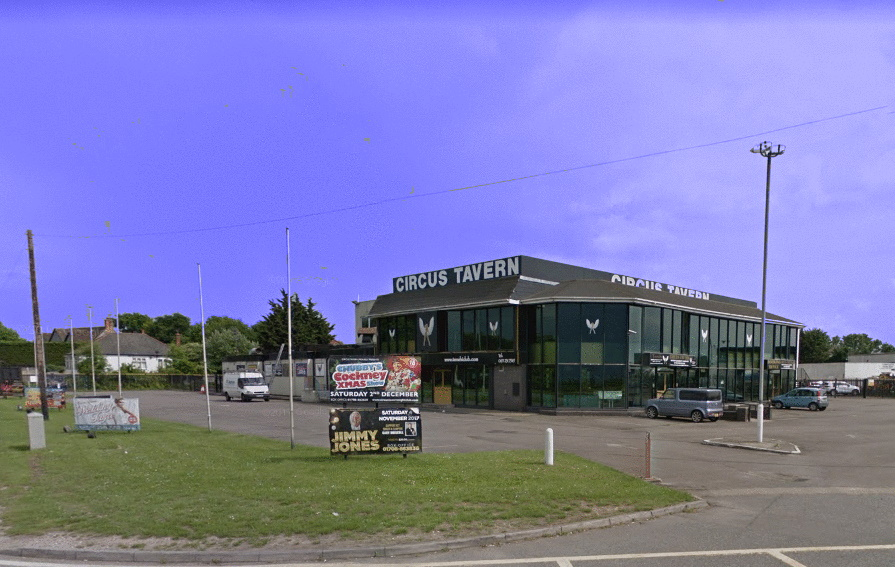
The Circus Tavern in 2018

The Circus Tavern is an entertainment venue in Purfleet, Essex, England, that hosts functions, cabaret acts and is also a nightclub venue. First opened in 1974, it is most famous as having been a long-time venue of the PDC World Darts Championship. Its capacity is 1,100 seated.

== Darts championships ==
The Circus Tavern was the venue of the PDC World Darts Championships from its inauguration event in 1994, up until 2007, and broadcast on Sky Sports. Phil Taylor reached the final in all 14 of the PDC World Darts Championship tournaments that were held at the Circus Tavern, winning 11 of those 14 finals (he lost to Dennis Priestley in 1994, John Part in 2003, and Raymond van Barneveld in 2007). The last World Championship match held at the Circus Tavern was the 2007 PDC World Darts Championship final, where Barneveld came from 0–3 down in sets to defeat Taylor, 7–6 in sets, after a sudden death leg. Many consider this match to be the greatest in the history of darts. At the time of the match, it was not known that it would be the last World Championship to be held at the Circus Tavern.

On 2 April 2007, Barry Hearn announced that the 2008 PDC World Darts Championship would be held at the Alexandra Palace in London.

Other darts events were held at the Circus Tavern in the three years following. In 2008, the Circus Tavern was the venue for the opening round and the play-offs of the BetFred League of Legends, broadcast on Setanta Sports. In 2009 and 2010, the Players Championship Finals were held at the Circus Tavern, broadcast on ITV, featuring the top 32 players from the previous year's Players Championship Order of Merit. In 2019, the BDO signed a contract to hold the World Masters at the Circus Tavern.

There were also two other televised darts events held at the Circus Tavern:

- "The Battle of the Champions" on 29 June 1997, broadcast on Sky Sports. This event featured Dennis Priestley defeating John Part 3–0 in sets in the battle between the 1994 World Champions, Eric Bristow defeating Alan Evans 3–0 in sets in a Legends match between two old rivals, and reigning PDC World Champion Phil Taylor defeating 1995 BDO World Champion Richie Burnett 4–1 in sets in the Main Event.
- "The Showdown" on 21 November 2004, broadcast on Sky Box Office. This event featured Eric Bristow defeating John Lowe 6–1 in legs in a Legends match between the two old rivals, Roland Scholten defeating Wayne Mardle 6–5 in legs in the second match, and the Main Event between the reigning PDC World Champion Phil Taylor and the reigning BDO World Champion Andy Fordham. Originally intended to be best of 13 sets, Taylor was leading 5–2 when Fordham suffered breathing difficulties and was forced to retire.

Since 2022, the Circus Tavern has hosted the World Seniors Darts Championship.
