= 2007 Grand Slam of Darts =

2007 PartyBets.com Grand Slam of Darts

Tournament information
- Dates: 17–25 November 2007
- Venue: Wolverhampton Civic Hall
- Location: Wolverhampton
- Country: England
- Organisation(s): PDC
- Format: Legs
- Prize fund: £300,000
- Winner's share: £80,000
- High checkout: 170 (England) James Wade

Champion(s)
- (England) Phil Taylor

The 2007 PartyBets.com Grand Slam of Darts was the inaugural staging of the darts tournament, the Grand Slam of Darts, held by the Professional Darts Corporation. The tournament invited the best performing players from the PDC and its rival the British Darts Organisation. There had been two previous head-to-head matches between the champions of the two organisations and a few tournaments have also featured BDO v PDC clashes. This tournament was the first of its kind to be held in the United Kingdom.

The 2007 tournament was staged at the Wolverhampton Civic Hall, Wolverhampton, England from 17–25 November 2007. Phil Taylor won the title, beating Andy Hamilton 18–11 in the final. In one of the early group matches which may not have stood out at the time, John Part narrowly beat Mark Webster 5–4 and less than two months later the two players became the World Champions of their respective organisations.

== Format ==
The 32 players were split into eight groups of four players with the top two from each group qualifying for the last 16 knockout stages. Each player was therefore guaranteed three matches in the competition. Two points were awarded for a win. All group games were best of 9 legs, the second-round games were extended to best of 19 legs, the semi-finals best of 25 legs, and the final best of 35 legs.

== Prize money ==
PartyPoker.net increased the prize fund for the event from the original announcement of £250,000 to £300,000 making it the second richest tournament in 2007 – ahead of both the Premier League and the BDO World Championship.

Position (num. of players)		Prize money (Total: £300,000)
Winner	(1)	£80,000
Runner-up	(1)	£35,000
Semi-finalists	(2)	£15,000
Quarter-finalists	(4)	£10,000
Last 16 (second round)	(8)	£6,000
Last 32 (group stage)	(16)	£4,000

== Controversy ==
Controversy hit the tournament in May when it was confirmed by the BDO that the Winmau World Masters had been moved from its original dates of 26–28 October to a new date of 16–18 November, clashing directly with the Grand Slam. This meant that players from the BDO were forced into a direct choice between competing at the Masters for valuable ranking points or taking their place at the Grand Slam for better prize money. BDO World Champion Martin Adams almost immediately confirmed that he would participate in the Masters, though he was the only BDO player to do so. Adams went out in the quarter-finals of the World Masters meaning his pay cheque of £1,250 was significantly less than the £4,000 he would have received simply for turning up at the Grand Slam. Adams also declined the chance to compete in 2008, even though the two tournaments did not clash as the Masters was moved to December.

== Qualifiers ==
The PDC Chairman Barry Hearn announced on 21 February 2007 that all major tournament finalists for the past two years from both the BDO and PDC will be invited to the event. Also World Championship semi-finalists from the same period would receive an invite.

The tournaments used for the qualifying criteria were the two World Championships, the World Matchplay, World Grand Prix and World Masters (2006 only), UK Open, Las Vegas Desert Classic, Premier League, World Series of Darts, International Darts League and the World Darts Trophy with the field set at 32 players.

BDO players Gary Anderson, Mark Webster, Shaun Greatbatch, Niels de Ruiter, Phill Nixon and Scott Waites all accepted invites to the event leaving Martin Adams (the BDO World Champion) as the only player to have rejected the opportunity to play. He participated in the 2007 Winmau World Masters instead, losing at the quarter-final stage.

=== PDC ===
Tournament	Year	Position	Player	Qualifiers
PDC World Darts Championship	2006	Winner	(England) Phil Taylor	(England) Phil Taylor (England) Peter Manley (England) Wayne Jones (England) Wayne Mardle (Netherlands) Raymond van Barneveld (England) Andy Hamilton (England) Andy Jenkins (England) James Wade (England) Terry Jenkins (Canada) John Part (Wales) Barrie Bates (Netherlands) Vincent van der Voort (England) Adrian Lewis (Netherlands) Roland Scholten
PDC World Darts Championship	2006	Runner-up	(England) Peter Manley	(England) Phil Taylor (England) Peter Manley (England) Wayne Jones (England) Wayne Mardle (Netherlands) Raymond van Barneveld (England) Andy Hamilton (England) Andy Jenkins (England) James Wade (England) Terry Jenkins (Canada) John Part (Wales) Barrie Bates (Netherlands) Vincent van der Voort (England) Adrian Lewis (Netherlands) Roland Scholten
PDC World Darts Championship	2006	Semi-finalists	(England) Wayne Jones (England) Wayne Mardle	(England) Phil Taylor (England) Peter Manley (England) Wayne Jones (England) Wayne Mardle (Netherlands) Raymond van Barneveld (England) Andy Hamilton (England) Andy Jenkins (England) James Wade (England) Terry Jenkins (Canada) John Part (Wales) Barrie Bates (Netherlands) Vincent van der Voort (England) Adrian Lewis (Netherlands) Roland Scholten
PDC World Darts Championship	2007	Winner	(Netherlands) Raymond van Barneveld	(England) Phil Taylor (England) Peter Manley (England) Wayne Jones (England) Wayne Mardle (Netherlands) Raymond van Barneveld (England) Andy Hamilton (England) Andy Jenkins (England) James Wade (England) Terry Jenkins (Canada) John Part (Wales) Barrie Bates (Netherlands) Vincent van der Voort (England) Adrian Lewis (Netherlands) Roland Scholten
PDC World Darts Championship	2007	Runner-up	(England) Phil Taylor	(England) Phil Taylor (England) Peter Manley (England) Wayne Jones (England) Wayne Mardle (Netherlands) Raymond van Barneveld (England) Andy Hamilton (England) Andy Jenkins (England) James Wade (England) Terry Jenkins (Canada) John Part (Wales) Barrie Bates (Netherlands) Vincent van der Voort (England) Adrian Lewis (Netherlands) Roland Scholten
PDC World Darts Championship	2007	Semi-finalists	(England) Andy Hamilton (England) Andy Jenkins	(England) Phil Taylor (England) Peter Manley (England) Wayne Jones (England) Wayne Mardle (Netherlands) Raymond van Barneveld (England) Andy Hamilton (England) Andy Jenkins (England) James Wade (England) Terry Jenkins (Canada) John Part (Wales) Barrie Bates (Netherlands) Vincent van der Voort (England) Adrian Lewis (Netherlands) Roland Scholten
World Matchplay	2006	Winner	(England) Phil Taylor	(England) Phil Taylor (England) Peter Manley (England) Wayne Jones (England) Wayne Mardle (Netherlands) Raymond van Barneveld (England) Andy Hamilton (England) Andy Jenkins (England) James Wade (England) Terry Jenkins (Canada) John Part (Wales) Barrie Bates (Netherlands) Vincent van der Voort (England) Adrian Lewis (Netherlands) Roland Scholten
World Matchplay	2006	Runner-up	(England) James Wade	(England) Phil Taylor (England) Peter Manley (England) Wayne Jones (England) Wayne Mardle (Netherlands) Raymond van Barneveld (England) Andy Hamilton (England) Andy Jenkins (England) James Wade (England) Terry Jenkins (Canada) John Part (Wales) Barrie Bates (Netherlands) Vincent van der Voort (England) Adrian Lewis (Netherlands) Roland Scholten
World Matchplay	2007	Winner	(England) James Wade	(England) Phil Taylor (England) Peter Manley (England) Wayne Jones (England) Wayne Mardle (Netherlands) Raymond van Barneveld (England) Andy Hamilton (England) Andy Jenkins (England) James Wade (England) Terry Jenkins (Canada) John Part (Wales) Barrie Bates (Netherlands) Vincent van der Voort (England) Adrian Lewis (Netherlands) Roland Scholten
World Matchplay	2007	Runner-up	(England) Terry Jenkins	(England) Phil Taylor (England) Peter Manley (England) Wayne Jones (England) Wayne Mardle (Netherlands) Raymond van Barneveld (England) Andy Hamilton (England) Andy Jenkins (England) James Wade (England) Terry Jenkins (Canada) John Part (Wales) Barrie Bates (Netherlands) Vincent van der Voort (England) Adrian Lewis (Netherlands) Roland Scholten
World Grand Prix	2006	Winner	(England) Phil Taylor	(England) Phil Taylor (England) Peter Manley (England) Wayne Jones (England) Wayne Mardle (Netherlands) Raymond van Barneveld (England) Andy Hamilton (England) Andy Jenkins (England) James Wade (England) Terry Jenkins (Canada) John Part (Wales) Barrie Bates (Netherlands) Vincent van der Voort (England) Adrian Lewis (Netherlands) Roland Scholten
World Grand Prix	2006	Runner-up	(England) Terry Jenkins	(England) Phil Taylor (England) Peter Manley (England) Wayne Jones (England) Wayne Mardle (Netherlands) Raymond van Barneveld (England) Andy Hamilton (England) Andy Jenkins (England) James Wade (England) Terry Jenkins (Canada) John Part (Wales) Barrie Bates (Netherlands) Vincent van der Voort (England) Adrian Lewis (Netherlands) Roland Scholten
World Grand Prix	2007	Winner	(England) James Wade	(England) Phil Taylor (England) Peter Manley (England) Wayne Jones (England) Wayne Mardle (Netherlands) Raymond van Barneveld (England) Andy Hamilton (England) Andy Jenkins (England) James Wade (England) Terry Jenkins (Canada) John Part (Wales) Barrie Bates (Netherlands) Vincent van der Voort (England) Adrian Lewis (Netherlands) Roland Scholten
World Grand Prix	2007	Runner-up	(England) Terry Jenkins	(England) Phil Taylor (England) Peter Manley (England) Wayne Jones (England) Wayne Mardle (Netherlands) Raymond van Barneveld (England) Andy Hamilton (England) Andy Jenkins (England) James Wade (England) Terry Jenkins (Canada) John Part (Wales) Barrie Bates (Netherlands) Vincent van der Voort (England) Adrian Lewis (Netherlands) Roland Scholten
Las Vegas Desert Classic	2006	Winner	(Canada) John Part	(England) Phil Taylor (England) Peter Manley (England) Wayne Jones (England) Wayne Mardle (Netherlands) Raymond van Barneveld (England) Andy Hamilton (England) Andy Jenkins (England) James Wade (England) Terry Jenkins (Canada) John Part (Wales) Barrie Bates (Netherlands) Vincent van der Voort (England) Adrian Lewis (Netherlands) Roland Scholten
Las Vegas Desert Classic	2006	Runner-up	(Netherlands) Raymond van Barneveld	(England) Phil Taylor (England) Peter Manley (England) Wayne Jones (England) Wayne Mardle (Netherlands) Raymond van Barneveld (England) Andy Hamilton (England) Andy Jenkins (England) James Wade (England) Terry Jenkins (Canada) John Part (Wales) Barrie Bates (Netherlands) Vincent van der Voort (England) Adrian Lewis (Netherlands) Roland Scholten
Las Vegas Desert Classic	2007	Winner	(Netherlands) Raymond van Barneveld	(England) Phil Taylor (England) Peter Manley (England) Wayne Jones (England) Wayne Mardle (Netherlands) Raymond van Barneveld (England) Andy Hamilton (England) Andy Jenkins (England) James Wade (England) Terry Jenkins (Canada) John Part (Wales) Barrie Bates (Netherlands) Vincent van der Voort (England) Adrian Lewis (Netherlands) Roland Scholten
Las Vegas Desert Classic	2007	Runner-up	(England) Terry Jenkins	(England) Phil Taylor (England) Peter Manley (England) Wayne Jones (England) Wayne Mardle (Netherlands) Raymond van Barneveld (England) Andy Hamilton (England) Andy Jenkins (England) James Wade (England) Terry Jenkins (Canada) John Part (Wales) Barrie Bates (Netherlands) Vincent van der Voort (England) Adrian Lewis (Netherlands) Roland Scholten
UK Open	2006	Winner	(Netherlands) Raymond van Barneveld	(England) Phil Taylor (England) Peter Manley (England) Wayne Jones (England) Wayne Mardle (Netherlands) Raymond van Barneveld (England) Andy Hamilton (England) Andy Jenkins (England) James Wade (England) Terry Jenkins (Canada) John Part (Wales) Barrie Bates (Netherlands) Vincent van der Voort (England) Adrian Lewis (Netherlands) Roland Scholten
UK Open	2006	Runner-up	(Wales) Barrie Bates	(England) Phil Taylor (England) Peter Manley (England) Wayne Jones (England) Wayne Mardle (Netherlands) Raymond van Barneveld (England) Andy Hamilton (England) Andy Jenkins (England) James Wade (England) Terry Jenkins (Canada) John Part (Wales) Barrie Bates (Netherlands) Vincent van der Voort (England) Adrian Lewis (Netherlands) Roland Scholten
UK Open	2007	Winner	(Netherlands) Raymond van Barneveld	(England) Phil Taylor (England) Peter Manley (England) Wayne Jones (England) Wayne Mardle (Netherlands) Raymond van Barneveld (England) Andy Hamilton (England) Andy Jenkins (England) James Wade (England) Terry Jenkins (Canada) John Part (Wales) Barrie Bates (Netherlands) Vincent van der Voort (England) Adrian Lewis (Netherlands) Roland Scholten
UK Open	2007	Runner-up	(Netherlands) Vincent van der Voort	(England) Phil Taylor (England) Peter Manley (England) Wayne Jones (England) Wayne Mardle (Netherlands) Raymond van Barneveld (England) Andy Hamilton (England) Andy Jenkins (England) James Wade (England) Terry Jenkins (Canada) John Part (Wales) Barrie Bates (Netherlands) Vincent van der Voort (England) Adrian Lewis (Netherlands) Roland Scholten
World Series of Darts	2006	Winner	(England) Phil Taylor	(England) Phil Taylor (England) Peter Manley (England) Wayne Jones (England) Wayne Mardle (Netherlands) Raymond van Barneveld (England) Andy Hamilton (England) Andy Jenkins (England) James Wade (England) Terry Jenkins (Canada) John Part (Wales) Barrie Bates (Netherlands) Vincent van der Voort (England) Adrian Lewis (Netherlands) Roland Scholten
World Series of Darts	2006	Runner-up	(England) Adrian Lewis	(England) Phil Taylor (England) Peter Manley (England) Wayne Jones (England) Wayne Mardle (Netherlands) Raymond van Barneveld (England) Andy Hamilton (England) Andy Jenkins (England) James Wade (England) Terry Jenkins (Canada) John Part (Wales) Barrie Bates (Netherlands) Vincent van der Voort (England) Adrian Lewis (Netherlands) Roland Scholten
US Open	2007	Winner	(England) Phil Taylor	(England) Phil Taylor (England) Peter Manley (England) Wayne Jones (England) Wayne Mardle (Netherlands) Raymond van Barneveld (England) Andy Hamilton (England) Andy Jenkins (England) James Wade (England) Terry Jenkins (Canada) John Part (Wales) Barrie Bates (Netherlands) Vincent van der Voort (England) Adrian Lewis (Netherlands) Roland Scholten
US Open	2007	Runner-up	(Netherlands) Raymond van Barneveld	(England) Phil Taylor (England) Peter Manley (England) Wayne Jones (England) Wayne Mardle (Netherlands) Raymond van Barneveld (England) Andy Hamilton (England) Andy Jenkins (England) James Wade (England) Terry Jenkins (Canada) John Part (Wales) Barrie Bates (Netherlands) Vincent van der Voort (England) Adrian Lewis (Netherlands) Roland Scholten
Premier League Darts	2006	Winner	(England) Phil Taylor	(England) Phil Taylor (England) Peter Manley (England) Wayne Jones (England) Wayne Mardle (Netherlands) Raymond van Barneveld (England) Andy Hamilton (England) Andy Jenkins (England) James Wade (England) Terry Jenkins (Canada) John Part (Wales) Barrie Bates (Netherlands) Vincent van der Voort (England) Adrian Lewis (Netherlands) Roland Scholten
Premier League Darts	2006	Runner-up	(Netherlands) Roland Scholten	(England) Phil Taylor (England) Peter Manley (England) Wayne Jones (England) Wayne Mardle (Netherlands) Raymond van Barneveld (England) Andy Hamilton (England) Andy Jenkins (England) James Wade (England) Terry Jenkins (Canada) John Part (Wales) Barrie Bates (Netherlands) Vincent van der Voort (England) Adrian Lewis (Netherlands) Roland Scholten
Premier League Darts	2007	Winner	(England) Phil Taylor	(England) Phil Taylor (England) Peter Manley (England) Wayne Jones (England) Wayne Mardle (Netherlands) Raymond van Barneveld (England) Andy Hamilton (England) Andy Jenkins (England) James Wade (England) Terry Jenkins (Canada) John Part (Wales) Barrie Bates (Netherlands) Vincent van der Voort (England) Adrian Lewis (Netherlands) Roland Scholten
Premier League Darts	2007	Runner-up	(England) Terry Jenkins	(England) Phil Taylor (England) Peter Manley (England) Wayne Jones (England) Wayne Mardle (Netherlands) Raymond van Barneveld (England) Andy Hamilton (England) Andy Jenkins (England) James Wade (England) Terry Jenkins (Canada) John Part (Wales) Barrie Bates (Netherlands) Vincent van der Voort (England) Adrian Lewis (Netherlands) Roland Scholten
Note: Players in italics had already qualified for the tournament.				(England) Phil Taylor (England) Peter Manley (England) Wayne Jones (England) Wayne Mardle (Netherlands) Raymond van Barneveld (England) Andy Hamilton (England) Andy Jenkins (England) James Wade (England) Terry Jenkins (Canada) John Part (Wales) Barrie Bates (Netherlands) Vincent van der Voort (England) Adrian Lewis (Netherlands) Roland Scholten

=== BDO ===
Tournament	Year	Position	Player	Qualifiers
BDO World Darts Championship	2006	Winner	(Netherlands) Jelle Klaasen	(Netherlands) Jelle Klaasen (England) Shaun Greatbatch (England) Phill Nixon (England) Mervyn King (Netherlands) Niels de Ruiter (Netherlands) Michael van Gerwen
BDO World Darts Championship	2006	Runner-up	(Netherlands) Raymond van Barneveld	(Netherlands) Jelle Klaasen (England) Shaun Greatbatch (England) Phill Nixon (England) Mervyn King (Netherlands) Niels de Ruiter (Netherlands) Michael van Gerwen
BDO World Darts Championship	2006	Semi-finalists	(England) ~~Martin Adams~~ (England) Shaun Greatbatch	(Netherlands) Jelle Klaasen (England) Shaun Greatbatch (England) Phill Nixon (England) Mervyn King (Netherlands) Niels de Ruiter (Netherlands) Michael van Gerwen
BDO World Darts Championship	2007	Winner	(England) ~~Martin Adams~~	(Netherlands) Jelle Klaasen (England) Shaun Greatbatch (England) Phill Nixon (England) Mervyn King (Netherlands) Niels de Ruiter (Netherlands) Michael van Gerwen
BDO World Darts Championship	2007	Runner-up	(England) Phill Nixon	(Netherlands) Jelle Klaasen (England) Shaun Greatbatch (England) Phill Nixon (England) Mervyn King (Netherlands) Niels de Ruiter (Netherlands) Michael van Gerwen
BDO World Darts Championship	2007	Semi-finalists	(England) Mervyn King (Netherlands) Niels de Ruiter	(Netherlands) Jelle Klaasen (England) Shaun Greatbatch (England) Phill Nixon (England) Mervyn King (Netherlands) Niels de Ruiter (Netherlands) Michael van Gerwen
World Masters	2006	Winner	(Netherlands) Michael van Gerwen	(Netherlands) Jelle Klaasen (England) Shaun Greatbatch (England) Phill Nixon (England) Mervyn King (Netherlands) Niels de Ruiter (Netherlands) Michael van Gerwen
World Masters	2006	Runner-up	(England) ~~Martin Adams~~	(Netherlands) Jelle Klaasen (England) Shaun Greatbatch (England) Phill Nixon (England) Mervyn King (Netherlands) Niels de Ruiter (Netherlands) Michael van Gerwen
Note: Players in italics had already qualified for the tournament.				(Netherlands) Jelle Klaasen (England) Shaun Greatbatch (England) Phill Nixon (England) Mervyn King (Netherlands) Niels de Ruiter (Netherlands) Michael van Gerwen

=== Defunct Tournaments ===
Tournament	Year	Position	Player	Qualifiers
International Darts League	2006	Winner	(Netherlands) Raymond van Barneveld	(England) Colin Lloyd (Scotland) Gary Anderson (Wales) Mark Webster
International Darts League	2006	Runner-up	(England) Colin Lloyd	(England) Colin Lloyd (Scotland) Gary Anderson (Wales) Mark Webster
International Darts League	2007	Winner	(Scotland) Gary Anderson	(England) Colin Lloyd (Scotland) Gary Anderson (Wales) Mark Webster
International Darts League	2007	Runner-up	(Wales) Mark Webster	(England) Colin Lloyd (Scotland) Gary Anderson (Wales) Mark Webster
World Darts Trophy	2006	Winner	(England) Phil Taylor	(England) Colin Lloyd (Scotland) Gary Anderson (Wales) Mark Webster
World Darts Trophy	2006	Runner-up	(England) ~~Martin Adams~~	(England) Colin Lloyd (Scotland) Gary Anderson (Wales) Mark Webster
World Darts Trophy	2007	Winner	(Scotland) Gary Anderson	(England) Colin Lloyd (Scotland) Gary Anderson (Wales) Mark Webster
World Darts Trophy	2007	Runner-up	(England) Phil Taylor	(England) Colin Lloyd (Scotland) Gary Anderson (Wales) Mark Webster
Note: Players in italics had already qualified for the tournament.				(England) Colin Lloyd (Scotland) Gary Anderson (Wales) Mark Webster

=== Other qualifiers ===
Criteria	Player
Highest Ranked PDC Non-Qualifier	(England) Dennis Priestley
Highest Ranked BDO Non-Qualifier	(England) Scott Waites
Wildcard Qualifier	(England) Chris Mason (England) Kevin McDine
DPA Australia Open Winner	(Australia) Pat Orreal
South African Open Winner	(South Africa) Charles Losper
North American Order Of Merit Leader	(United States) Gary Mawson
Late Entry Highest PDC Non-Qualifiers	(England) Ronnie Baxter (England) Kevin Painter

== Draws ==
=== Group stages ===
All matches race-to-5/best of 9.

NB in Brackets: Number = Seeds; BDO = BDO Darts player; RQ = Ranking qualifier; Q = Qualifier
NB: P = Played; W = Won; L = Lost; LF = Legs for; LA = Legs against; +/- = Plus/minus record, in relation to legs; Average = 3-dart average; Pts = Points

==== Group A ====
POS	Player	P	W	L	LF	LA	+/-	Pts	Status
1	(Netherlands) Raymond van Barneveld (1)	3	3	0	15	8	+7	6	Qualified
2	(England) Adrian Lewis	3	2	1	13	9	+4	4	Qualified
3	(England) Dennis Priestley (RQ)	3	1	2	11	14	−3	2	Eliminated
4	(England) Chris Mason (Q)	3	0	3	7	15	−8	0	Eliminated

17 November

105.26 Raymond van Barneveld (Netherlands)	5 – 3	(England) Chris Mason 95.94
94.08 Adrian Lewis (England)	5 – 4	(England) Dennis Priestley 95.93

18 November

100.94 Raymond van Barneveld (Netherlands)	5 – 3	(England) Adrian Lewis 94.03
81.44 Chris Mason (England)	4 – 5	(England) Dennis Priestley 87.81

19 November

82.48 Chris Mason (England)	0 – 5	(England) Adrian Lewis 101.55
104.08 Raymond van Barneveld (Netherlands)	5 – 2	(England) Dennis Priestley 103.53

==== Group B ====
POS	Player	P	W	L	LF	LA	+/-	Pts	Status
1	(England) Andy Hamilton	3	3	0	15	8	+7	6	Qualified
2	(England) Terry Jenkins (8)	3	2	1	12	9	+3	4	Qualified
3	(Netherlands) Vincent van der Voort	3	1	2	10	11	−1	2	Eliminated
4	(South Africa) Charles Losper (Q)	3	0	3	6	15	−9	0	Eliminated

17 November

97.39 Vincent van der Voort (Netherlands)	3 – 5	(England) Andy Hamilton 100.94
94.34 Terry Jenkins (England)	5 – 2	(South Africa) Charles Losper 85.75

18 November

93.24 Andy Hamilton (England)	5 – 2	(England) Terry Jenkins 86.28
96.85 Vincent van der Voort (Netherlands)	5 – 1	(South Africa) Charles Losper 89.18

19 November

85.78 Andy Hamilton (England)	5 – 3	(South Africa) Charles Losper 82.56
82.23 Vincent van der Voort (Netherlands)	2 – 5	(England) Terry Jenkins 90.06

==== Group C ====
POS	Player	P	W	L	LF	LA	+/-	Pts	Status
1	(England) James Wade (4)	3	3	0	15	6	+9	6	Qualified
2	(Australia) Pat Orreal (Q)	3	2	1	11	10	+1	4	Qualified
3	(England) Phill Nixon (BDO)	3	1	2	13	10	+3	2	Eliminated
4	(Netherlands) Niels de Ruiter (BDO)	3	0	3	2	15	−13	0	Eliminated

17 November

91.82 James Wade (England)	5 – 4	(England) Phill Nixon 92.19
76.61 Niels de Ruiter (Netherlands)	1 – 5	(Australia) Pat Orreal 86.21

18 November

102.79 James Wade (England)	5 – 1	(Australia) Pat Orreal 90.35
81.68 Phill Nixon (England)	5 – 0	(Netherlands) Niels de Ruiter 75.69

19 November

97.42 James Wade (England)	5 – 1	(Netherlands) Niels de Ruiter 85.15
76.61 Phill Nixon (England)	4 – 5	(Australia) Pat Orreal 81.89

==== Group D ====
POS	Player	P	W	L	LF	LA	+/-	Pts	Status
1	(Netherlands) Jelle Klaasen (5)	3	2	1	14	9	+5	4	Qualified
2	(England) Kevin McDine (Q)	3	2	1	13	8	+5	4	Qualified
3	(England) Shaun Greatbatch (BDO)	3	1	2	7	11	−4	2	Eliminated
4	(England) Peter Manley	3	1	2	8	14	−6	2	Eliminated

17 November

86.82 Jelle Klaasen (Netherlands)	5 – 1	(England) Shaun Greatbatch 86.07
87.83 Peter Manley (England)	2 – 5	(England) Kevin McDine 97.62

18 November

91.62 Jelle Klaasen (Netherlands)	5 – 3	(England) Kevin McDine 91.48
95.29 Shaun Greatbatch (England)	5 – 1	(England) Peter Manley 81.65

19 November

93.56 Jelle Klaasen (Netherlands)	4 – 5	(England) Peter Manley 92.71
97.47 Kevin McDine (England)	5 – 1	(England) Shaun Greatbatch 90.87

==== Group E ====
POS	Player	P	W	L	LF	LA	+/-	Pts	Status
1	(England) Phil Taylor (2)	3	3	0	15	5	+10	6	Qualified
2	(England) Colin Lloyd	3	2	1	11	9	+2	4	Qualified
3	(England) Wayne Mardle	3	1	2	8	12	−4	2	Eliminated
4	(England) Ronnie Baxter (RQ)	3	0	3	7	15	−8	0	Eliminated

17 November

91.64 Phil Taylor (England)	5 – 2	(England) Wayne Mardle 87.45
99.37 Colin Lloyd (England)	5 – 3	(England) Ronnie Baxter 91.76

18 November

104.82 Phil Taylor (England)	5 – 1	(England) Colin Lloyd 91.45
85.68 Wayne Mardle (England)	5 – 2	(England) Ronnie Baxter 81.59

20 November

86.09 Ronnie Baxter (England)	2 – 5	(England) Phil Taylor 97.24
93.91 Colin Lloyd (England)	5 – 1	(England) Wayne Mardle 80.75

==== Group F ====
POS	Player	P	W	L	LF	LA	+/-	Pts	Status
1	(Canada) John Part (7)	3	2	1	12	9	+3	4	Qualified
2	(United States) Gary Mawson (Q)	3	2	1	11	10	+1	4	Qualified
3	(Wales) Mark Webster (BDO)	3	1	2	10	11	−1	2	Eliminated
4	(England) Andy Jenkins	3	1	2	8	11	−3	2	Eliminated

17 November

93.54 Mark Webster (Wales)	1 – 5	(England) Andy Jenkins 96.45
81.50 John Part (Canada)	2 – 5	(United States) Gary Mawson 87.03

18 November

97.70 Mark Webster (Wales)	4 – 5	(Canada) John Part 94.89
85.23 Andy Jenkins (England)	3 – 5	(United States) Gary Mawson 87.57

20 November

95.13 Andy Jenkins (England)	0 – 5	(Canada) John Part 95.13
85.76 Gary Mawson (United States)	1 – 5	(Wales) Mark Webster 96.20

==== Group G ====
POS	Player	P	W	L	LF	LA	+/-	Pts	Status
1	(England) Kevin Painter (RQ)	3	2	1	14	6	+8	4	Qualified
2	(Scotland) Gary Anderson (BDO, 3)	3	2	1	11	6	+5	4	Qualified
3	(Wales) Barrie Bates	3	1	2	5	11	−6	2	Eliminated
4	(England) Wayne Jones	3	1	2	7	14	−7	2	Eliminated

17 November

93.54 Gary Anderson (Scotland)	1 – 5	(England) Kevin Painter 96.45
86.50 Barrie Bates (Wales)	5 – 1	(England) Wayne Jones 80.82

18 November

87.38 Kevin Painter (England)	5 – 0	(Wales) Barrie Bates 83.14
94.86 Gary Anderson (Scotland)	5 – 1	(England) Wayne Jones 86.41

20 November

91.79 Kevin Painter (England)	4 – 5	(England) Wayne Jones 101.48
86.78 Barrie Bates (Wales)	0 – 5	(Scotland) Gary Anderson 107.36

==== Group H ====
POS	Player	P	W	L	LF	LA	+/-	Pts	Status
1	(Netherlands) Roland Scholten	3	3	0	15	4	+11	6	Qualified
2	(England) Mervyn King	3	2	1	13	10	+3	4	Qualified
3	(Netherlands) Michael van Gerwen	3	1	2	8	14	−6	2	Eliminated
4	(England) Scott Waites (BDO, RQ, 6)	3	0	3	7	15	−8	0	Eliminated

17 November

88.07 Michael van Gerwen (Netherlands)	5 – 4	(England) Scott Waites 84.92
98.35 Roland Scholten (Netherlands)	5 – 3	(England) Mervyn King 102.05

18 November

87.83 Scott Waites (England)	3 – 5	(England) Mervyn King 95.31
97.62 Michael van Gerwen (Netherlands)	1 – 5	(Netherlands) Roland Scholten 110.21

20 November

104.38 Roland Scholten (Netherlands)	5 – 0	(England) Scott Waites 90.55
94.61 Mervyn King (England)	5 – 2	(Netherlands) Michael van Gerwen 90.42

=== Knockout stages ===
Second round (best of 19 legs); 21–22 November
A1	(Netherlands) Raymond van Barneveld (1) 101.01	7
B2	(England) Terry Jenkins (8) 102.14	10
B1	(England) Andy Hamilton 96.60	10
A2	(England) Adrian Lewis 96.08	8
C1	(England) James Wade (4) 102.55	7
D2	(England) Kevin McDine (Q) 105.79	10
D1	(Netherlands) Jelle Klaasen (5) 89.14	10
C2	(Australia) Pat Orreal (Q) 85.47	9
E1	(England) Phil Taylor (2) 103.17	10
F2	(United States) Gary Mawson (Q) 91.12	4
F1	(Canada) John Part (7) 96.18	10
E2	(England) Colin Lloyd 93.67	7
G1	(England) Kevin Painter (RQ) 97.27	10
H2	(England) Mervyn King 92.57	7
H1	(Netherlands) Roland Scholten 95.70	7
G2	(Scotland) Gary Anderson (BDO, 3) 98.35	10

Quarter-finals (best of 19 legs); 23 November
B2	(England) Terry Jenkins (8) 93.59	8
B1	(England) Andy Hamilton 98.24	10
D2	(England) Kevin McDine (Q) 98.97	10
D1	(Netherlands) Jelle Klaasen (5) 91.90	3
E1	(England) Phil Taylor (2) 99.28	10
F1	(Canada) John Part (7) 92.61	7
G1	(England) Kevin Painter (RQ) 91.74	7
G2	(Scotland) Gary Anderson (BDO, 3) 94.06	10

Semi-finals (best of 25 legs); 24 November
B1	(England) Andy Hamilton 94.30	13
D2	(England) Kevin McDine (Q) 94.73	12
E1	(England) Phil Taylor (2) 96.86	13
G2	(Scotland) Gary Anderson (BDO, 3) 99.11	11

Final (best of 35 legs); 25 November
B1	(England) Andy Hamilton 100.97	11
E1	(England) Phil Taylor (2) 101.75	18

== Statistics ==
Player	Played	Legs Won	Legs Lost	100+	140+	180s	High checkout	3-dart average
Raymond van Barneveld	4	22	18	47	32	14	120	102.82
Adrian Lewis	4	21	19	60	25	6	150	96.44
Dennis Priestley	3	11	14	42	11	7	88	95.76
Chris Mason	3	7	15	33	6	4	157	86.62
Andy Hamilton	7	59	54	127	76	33	145	95.61
Vincent van der Voort	3	10	11	22	20	3	96	92.16
Terry Jenkins	5	30	26	70	52	10	140	93.28
Charles Losper	3	6	15	25	14	1	68	85.83
James Wade	4	22	16	49	31	10	170	98.65
Phill Nixon	3	13	10	31	13	4	116	83.49
Pat Orreal	4	20	20	40	28	7	115	85.98
Niels de Ruiter	3	2	15	20	6	1	98	79.15
Jelle Klaasen	5	27	28	84	33	9	125	90.61
Kevin McDine	6	45	31	114	45	23	161	97.68
Shaun Greatbatch	3	7	11	25	14	3	164	90.74
Peter Manley	3	8	14	34	15	2	76	87.40
Phil Taylor	7	66	39	128	89	29	153	99.25
Wayne Mardle	3	8	12	26	7	3	65	86.57
Colin Lloyd	4	18	19	39	33	7	150	94.60
Ronnie Baxter	3	7	15	25	13	4	134	86.48
Gary Mawson	4	16	20	46	25	5	136	87.87
Andy Jenkins	3	8	11	25	15	2	141	90.84
John Part	5	29	26	66	28	9	126	92.06
Mark Webster	3	10	11	25	17	2	117	95.81
Kevin Painter	5	31	23	66	33	19	120	92.82
Gary Anderson	6	42	33	99	67	22	158	97.50
Barrie Bates	3	5	11	26	10	0	123	85.47
Wayne Jones	3	7	14	27	21	2	81	89.57
Roland Scholten	4	22	14	56	28	10	144	102.16
Mervyn King	4	20	20	57	30	8	78	96.14
Michael van Gerwen	3	8	14	25	19	6	76	92.04
Scott Waites	3	7	15	25	11	3	96	87.77

== Television coverage ==
The tournament was televised by ITV. The first afternoon session on 17 November, the Sunday afternoon session on 18 November, the semi-finals, and the final were all broadcast live on ITV1. The rest of the tournament was shown live on ITV4. It was ITV's first televised darts tournament since they ceased coverage of the Winmau World Masters in 1988 – although they did show the first Clash of Champions match between Phil Taylor and Raymond van Barneveld in 1999.

The ITV Sport team consisted of lead presenter Matt Smith, analysts Steve Beaton and Alan Warriner-Little, and commentators John Rawling from ITV Boxing, Stuart Pyke from Sky Sports and Nigel Pearson of Talksport.
