= 2010 Players Championship Finals =

2010 totesport.com Players Championship Finals

Tournament information
- Dates: 28–31 January 2010
- Venue: Circus Tavern
- Location: Purfleet, England
- Organisation(s): Professional Darts Corporation (PDC)
- Format: Legs
- Prize fund: £250,000
- Winner's share: £60,000
- High checkout: 170 Paul Nicholson

Champion(s)
- Paul Nicholson (AUS)

The 2010 Players Championship Finals (officially the 2010 totesport.com Players Championship Finals) was a professional darts tournament held at the Circus Tavern in Purfleet, England, from 28 to 31 January 2010. It was the first of the five Professional Darts Corporation (PDC) premier events in the 2010 calendar and the second edition of the tournament. The event was sponsored by the betting company totesport.com and featured an increased prize fund of £250,000 with £60,000 going to the winner.

Phil Taylor, the world number one, was the tournament's defending champion, having won the first edition in 2009. Taylor was eliminated in the semi-finals by Paul Nicholson, who won the match 10 legs to 9 and proceeded to qualify for the final, defeating Dennis Priestley, Steve Beaton and Adrian Lewis in the three intervening rounds. Nicholson's opponent in the final was Mervyn King, whom he beat 13–11 for his first major PDC tournament win. He also achieved a tournament-high checkout of 170 in the ninth leg of his semi-final match against Taylor.

== Overview ==
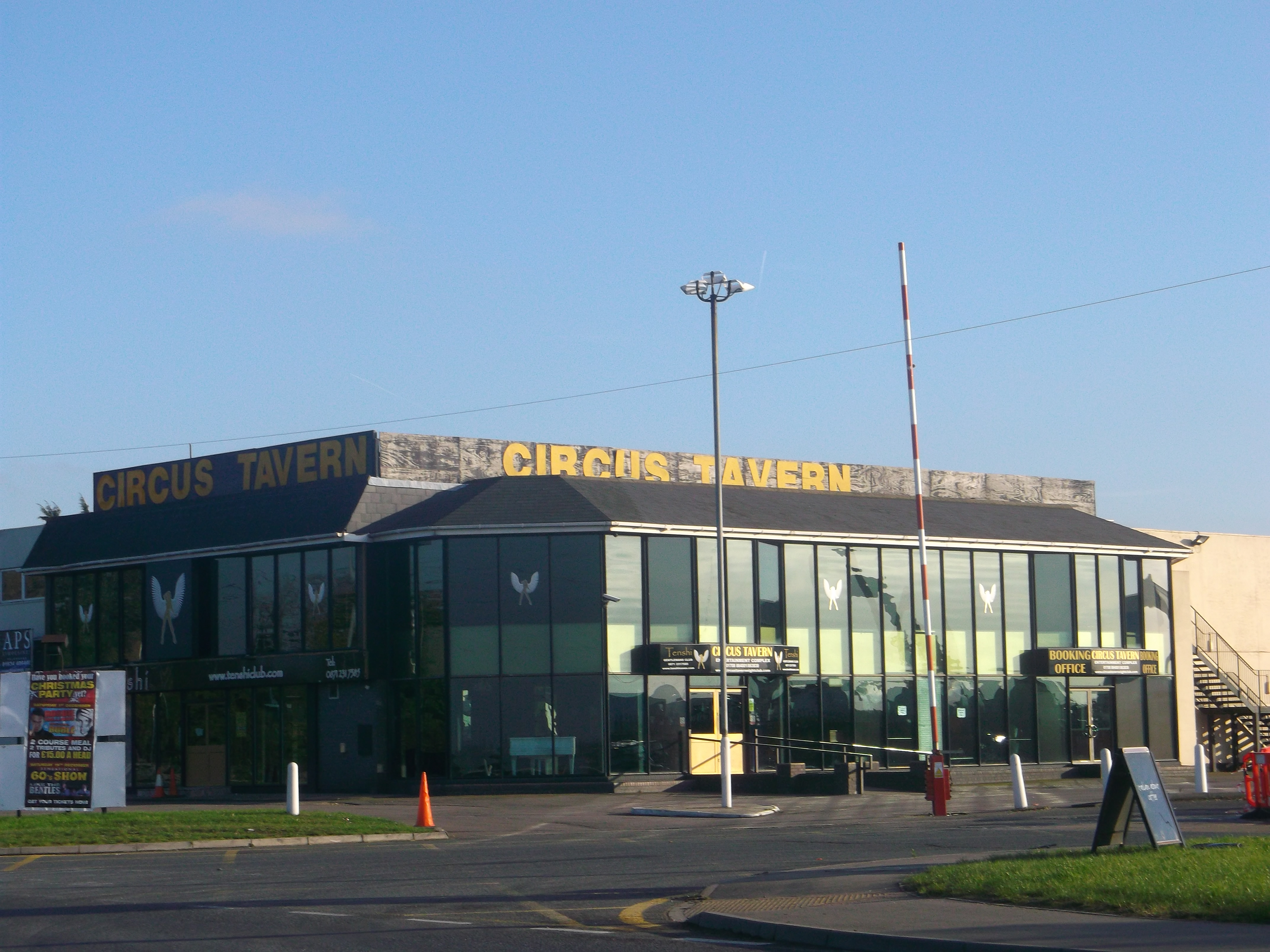
The Circus Tavern (pictured in 2012), where the competition took place

The Players Championship Finals was first organised by the Professional Darts Corporation (PDC) in 2009 and is the final tournament for the best players on the PDC Pro Tour. It occurred at the start of the season according to the final rankings of the year before. The 2010 competition was held between 28 and 31 January, and was the first of the five premier PDC events in the 2010 season. It was the second edition of the tournament and featured a 32-player draw at the Circus Tavern in Purfleet, Essex for the second successive year. Sponsored by the betting company totesport.com, it had a total prize fund of £250,000, and the host broadcaster was ITV4.

A total of 32 players from the final standings in the 2009 PDC Players Championship Order of Merit following the final Players Championship event of the 2009 season qualified for the competition with all of them seeded. (Note: Andy Jenkins qualified for the tournament but was suspended before it began and was replaced by Peter Manley.) The first seed was drawn against the 32nd seed while the second seed played the 31st seed and so on. Phil Taylor, the world number one and the 2009 Players Championship Finals winner, was the first seed and Mark Walsh was seeded second. Colin Osborne was seeded third and Adrian Lewis was the fourth seed. The maximum number of legs played in a match increased from 11 in the first round to 15 in the second and 17 and 19 in the quarter and semi-finals respectively, leading up to the best-of-25 legs final.

Bookmakers installed Taylor as the favourite to win the competition. He said he would like to retain the title at the Circus Tavern for the second successive year and commented on its format: "It's a short format in the first round but that will suit me because I've not played competitively since the World Championship. I haven't had a lot of time to prepare properly for this but I'm going into the tournament very relaxed."

== Prize fund ==
The Professional Dart Players Association donated £50,000 to raise the overall prize fund from £200,000 in 2009 to £250,000 in 2010, with the winner receiving £60,000. The breakdown of prize money for the 2010 tournament is shown below.

Position (no. of players)		Prize money (Total: £250,000)
Winner	(1)	£60,000
Runner-Up	(1)	£24,000
Semi-finalists	(2)	£15,000
Quarter-finalists	(4)	£10,000
Last 16 (second round)	(8)	£6,000
Last 32 (first round)	(16)	£3,000

== Qualification ==
The top 32 players from the PDC Players Championship Order of Merit after the last Players Championship of 2009 qualified for the event.

1. (England) Phil Taylor (semi-finals)
2. (England) Mark Walsh (second round)
3. (England) Colin Osborne (semi-finals)
4. (England) Adrian Lewis (quarter-finals)
5. (England) Steve Beaton (second round)
6. (England) Wes Newton (quarter-finals)
7. (Scotland) Gary Anderson (first round)
8. (England) Colin Lloyd (quarter-finals)
9. (Scotland) Robert Thornton (first round)
10. (England) James Wade (first round)
11. (England) Ronnie Baxter (second round)
12. (England) Dennis Priestley (first round)
13. (England) Alan Tabern (first round)
14. (England) Jamie Caven (first round)
15. (England) Wayne Jones (quarter-finals)
16. (England) Terry Jenkins (second round)
17. (Netherlands) Vincent van der Voort (first round)
18. (England) Andy Smith (first round)
19. (Netherlands) Michael van Gerwen (second round)
20. (England) Andy Hamilton (second round)
21. (Australia) Paul Nicholson (champion)
22. (England) Mark Dudbridge (first round)
23. (England) Mervyn King (runner-up)
24. (England) Kevin Painter (second round)
25. (England) Denis Ovens (first round)
26. (Netherlands) Jelle Klaasen (second round)
27. (Scotland) Peter Wright (first round)
28. (England) Tony Eccles (first round)
29. (Northern Ireland) Brendan Dolan (first round)
30. (Netherlands) Co Stompé (first round)
31. (England) Steve Hine (first round)
32. (England) Peter Manley (first round)

== Tournament summary ==
=== Round 1 ===
The first round of the competition, in which all 32 players participated, took place from 28 to 29 January. Colin Lloyd tied Denis Ovens four times before winning 6–5 on the double 16 ring in the final leg. Steve Beaton took a 5–0 lead and then won 6–2 over Tony Eccles after the latter prevented a whitewash with two finishes on the double 16 ring. Paul Nicholson, the 2009 Australian Open champion, defeated two-time world champion Dennis Priestley 6–2; Nicholson failed to complete a 170 checkout when he missed the bullseye ring in leg eight. Priestley said some errors lost him opportunities early on: "I may be getting too long in the tooth now but it didn't seem to go for me." Andy Hamilton led Alan Tabern 4–2 but Tabern tied at 4–4 with a 130 checkout and a finish on the double 13 ring. Hamilton then took legs nine and ten to win 6–4. Terry Jenkins was 5–3 behind Vincent van der Voort but achieved a 15-dart finish and a double 3 ring finish to win 6–5. Taylor used Peter Manley's misses at the double rings to win 6–2, while 2009 finalist Robert Thornton lost 6–3 to Kevin Painter after being 5–0 down but stopped a whitewash by winning three successive legs on checkouts of 121 and 77. Lewis overturned a 3–1 deficit to defeat Brendan Dolan 6–5 with a 100.49 three-dart average.

Wayne Jones beat the unwell Andy Smith 6–2 on checkouts of 68 and 74. Wes Newton used Peter Wright's errors to win 6–2 and attain a three-dart average of 97.59. Osborne led 3–1 and finished on the double 4 and 16 rings to beat Co Stompé 6–3 and requite his loss to the latter in the first round of the 2009 Las Vegas Desert Classic. Walsh led Steve Hine 3–0 before the latter took four of the next six legs to go 5–4 ahead. Walsh twice threw on an 84 checkout to win 6–4. Both Jelle Klaasen and Gary Anderson shared the first two legs of their match before Klaasen took five consecutive legs to win 6–1. Anderson said he practised well but did not perform during the game. Mervyn King beat James Wade 6–5. Trailing 5–2, checkouts of 130 and 96 allowed King to force a final leg decider, which he won on a 106 checkout after two errors from Wade. After coming from 4–1 down, Ronnie Baxter defeated Mark Dudbridge 6–5 in a final leg decider forced by Dudbridge and won by Baxter on a double 8 ring finish. Baxter failed to complete a nine-dart finish after missing the double 12 ring on his ninth throw. The final first round match saw Michael van Gerwen defeat Jamie Caven 6–2.

=== Round 2 ===
The second round consisted on best-of-15 legs on 30 January. Beaton became the second world champion to be eliminated from the tournament when he lost 8–5 to Nicholson. The two players twice shared the lead in the first eight legs before Nicholson led by two legs en route to earning the first quarter-final spot on a 70 checkout in leg 13. Lloyd came from 4–2 down to win six successive legs on checkouts of 106 and 108 with a three-dart average of 102.36 in an 8–4 victory over Painter. Jones came from 5–2 behind Walsh to secure six legs in a row and win 8–5. The afternoon's final match saw Newton defeat Baxter 8–7 on a final leg decider. He led 5–2 from checkouts of 99, 124 and a 13-dart finish before Baxter's 116 checkout and finish on the double 20 ring saw him win three of the next five legs. Five misses for Newton allowed Baxter to win the next two legs on finishes on the double 6 ring to force a final leg decider won by the former on the double 4 ring.

The evening session commenced with Lewis achieving 8–7 victory over Hamilton. Lewis established a 6–3 advantage on checkouts of 120 and 84 as well as finishes of 13 and 15 darts to which Hamilton came back to reduce the deficit to a single leg. Lewis took leg 12 and Hamilton the 13th after the former missed the double 16 ring. Hamilton's finish on the double 8 ring moved the match to a final leg decider, which Lewis won on a 56 checkout. King made finishes on the double 4, 8 and 18 rings and a ninth-leg match-winning checkout of 61 to defeat Klassen 8–1; the one leg Klassen took came on a 96 checkout in leg six. King expressed sympathy for Klassen and called it "an awkward match." Taylor and Jenkins were never separated by more than a single leg in their game, which Taylor won 8–7 on a 14-dart finish. Taylor made a 160 checkout in the ninth leg. In the last second-round game, Osborne achieved a 160 checkout in his 6–2 defeat of Van Gerwen, saying afterwards: "Michael wasn't at his best but I can only worry about my own darts and that's what I did."

=== Quarter-finals ===
The four best-of-19 leg quarter-finals took place on the afternoon of 31 January. Lewis and Nicholson played the first quarter-final. Nicholson led 3–1 from finishes on the double 20 and 2 rings as well a checkout of 101 in leg two. Both players shared the following nine legs to tie at 7–7 score before Nicholson achieved a 13-dart finish and a double 8 ring finish to win the match 9–7 and qualified for his first televised semi-final. The second quarter-final was between Osborne and Newton. Osborne, the 2009 Championship League Darts champion, opened up a 6–3 lead from errors made by Newton in the first nine legs. He was unable to complete a nine-dart finish when his seventh throw at the triple 20 ring was unsuccessful, allowing Osborne to claim two more legs on a 70 checkout and a finish on the double 20 ring to put himself a leg away from entry to the semi-finals. Checkouts of 96 and 124 from Newton forced the game to end with a 17th leg, which Osborne clinched on a finish on the double 8 ring for a 9–8 victory following errors by Newton.

The third quarter-final was between Lloyd and Taylor. Lloyd led 5–3 as both players exchanged the lead. Taylor took the lead on a 112 checkout in the 9th leg, a 15-dart finish in the 10th, a finish on the double 8 ring in the 11th and a 76 checkout in the 12th. Lloyd won two more legs on checkouts of 130 and 121 as Taylor sealed a 9–7 victory on a 14-dart finish in leg 15 and a three-dart average of 106.44. Taylor said Lloyd "seemed to take the darts off me" and commented that Nicholson would be a difficult opponent. King and Jones played the last quarter-final. Finishes on the double 5 and 16 rings and checkouts of 72 and 64 put King 6–1 ahead before Jones achieved an 11-dart finish in the eighth leg for a second leg. King subsequently took the next three legs on a 64 checkout and a finish on the double 16 ring for the last semi-final spot in a 9–2 win. King said post-match he was doubtful in one leg but would accept the result.

=== Semi-finals and final ===
Both of the best-of-21 leg semi-finals were held later that evening. The first semi-final was played by King and Osborne. King took four of the first five legs with finishes on the double 2, 8 and 16 rings. Osborne won the next two with finishes in 13 and 14 throws respectively before his errors allowed King to claim the next three legs on a checkout of 101 and the double 20 ring. Both players shared the following four legs, which saw King be within a leg of victory, until Osborne produced finishes on the double 16 and 8 rings and an 81 checkout. King struck the double 20 ring in the 18th leg to end the match an 10–8 winner and earn a spot in the final. King expressed his surprise to lead at the first interval but was delighted to qualify for the final. Osborne said the beginning of the match was when he became aware of what he was confronted with and conceded "it wasn't good enough at the end of the day."

Nicholson and Taylor contested the second semi-final. Taylor led 3–1 from checkouts of 61 and 79 as well as a 14-dart finish. Nicholson made checkouts of 121 and 130 in legs five and six to draw level. The two players exchanged the next two legs before Nicholson took a 6–4 lead on a checkout of 76 completed on the double 16 ring in leg eight and a tournament-high checkout of 170 in the ninth. Nicholson moved two legs ahead with a 13-dart finish in the 10th leg, which Taylor nullified by winning legs 11 and 12. Two misses from Taylor at the double 16 ring allowed Nicholson to obtain a three-leg advantage and go within one leg of taking the second berth in the final. But Taylor used errors from Nicholson to win the next two legs on the double 4 ring and a subsequent 64 checkout to force a final leg decider. Nicholson took the lead on two scores of more than 100 and hit the double five ring to win 10–9. Post-match, Nicholson said his finishing was the key to victory and Taylor felt the latter was a deserved winner due to Nicholson playing better.

The best-of-25 legs final between King and Nicholson commenced at 21:30 local time that same evening. Nicholson took the first leg on a 105 checkout and King the second to level at 1–1. Both of the following two legs were shared, which saw a 96 checkout from Nicholson in leg four, before King took the lead on the double 16 ring at the first interval. Nicholson returned to the lead by securing another two legs until King's finishes on the double 16 and 10 rings regained him the lead. Nicholson restored the score to a tie with a finish on the double 12 ring, but King clinched four of the next six legs to go 9–7 in front. Checkouts of 76, 90 and 68 won Nicholson back the lead and King took the 20th leg. Nicholson achieved finishes of 14 and 11 throws to be within a leg of victory until King made an 80 checkout to secure an 11th leg. The match was won by Nicholson 13–11 on the double 8 ring.

Nicholson won his first major PDC tournament, earning £60,000 prize money for doing so; he progressed to 16th in the PDC Order of Merit. Nicholson commented on the effect of his victory: "It's absolutely incredible and means a massive amount to me, I had a lot of my energy sapped from the semi-final against Phil, but I was desperate to win the final." He added his play was receding following a Players Championship event in Barnsley in June 2009 and that advice from King helped him. Although King lost to Nicholson, he moved to fourth in the PDC Order of Merit. He said he was upset to lose because he felt the final was his worst performance of the competition but hoped to win the tournament in the future.

== Draw ==
First round (best of 11 legs); 28–29 January
1	(England) Phil Taylor 95.58	6
32	(England) Peter Manley 83.98	2
16	(England) Terry Jenkins 90.66	6
17	(Netherlands) Vincent van der Voort 88.44	5
8	(England) Colin Lloyd 91.81	6
25	(England) Denis Ovens 92.32	5
9	(Scotland) Robert Thornton 87.20	3
24	(England) Kevin Painter 97.36	6
5	(England) Steve Beaton 90.23	6
28	(England) Tony Eccles 88.01	2
12	(England) Dennis Priestley 84.30	2
21	(Australia) Paul Nicholson 96.69	6
4	(England) Adrian Lewis 100.49	6
29	(Northern Ireland) Brendan Dolan 88.57	5
13	(England) Alan Tabern 92.01	4
20	(England) Andy Hamilton 93.78	6
2	(England) Mark Walsh 87.35	6
31	(England) Steve Hine 83.57	4
15	(England) Wayne Jones 81.25	6
18	(England) Andy Smith 74.35	2
7	(Scotland) Gary Anderson 88.31	1
26	(Netherlands) Jelle Klaasen 97.97	6
10	(England) James Wade 99.95	5
23	(England) Mervyn King 102.18	6
6	(England) Wes Newton 97.59	6
27	(Scotland) Peter Wright 84.23	2
11	(England) Ronnie Baxter 92.72	6
22	(England) Mark Dudbridge 85.68	5
3	(England) Colin Osborne 91.07	6
30	(Netherlands) Co Stompé 88.12	3
14	(England) Jamie Caven 88.43	2
19	(Netherlands) Michael van Gerwen 92.90	6

Second round (best of 15 legs); 30 January
1	(England) Phil Taylor 99.90	8
16	(England) Terry Jenkins 93.45	7
8	(England) Colin Lloyd 102.36	8
24	(England) Kevin Painter 93.41	4
5	(England) Steve Beaton 91.37	5
21	(Australia) Paul Nicholson 93.93	8
4	(England) Adrian Lewis 93.28	8
20	(England) Andy Hamilton 92.02	7
2	(England) Mark Walsh 88.83	5
15	(England) Wayne Jones 92.67	8
26	(Netherlands) Jelle Klaasen 82.26	1
23	(England) Mervyn King 100.81	8
6	(England) Wes Newton 93.88	8
11	(England) Ronnie Baxter 91.77	7
3	(England) Colin Osborne 90.98	8
19	(Netherlands) Michael van Gerwen 90.88	2

Quarter-finals (best of 17 legs); 31 January
1	(England) Phil Taylor 106.44	9
8	(England) Colin Lloyd 100.95	7
21	(Australia) Paul Nicholson 93.18	9
4	(England) Adrian Lewis 97.44	7
15	(England) Wayne Jones 95.60	2
23	(England) Mervyn King 96.13	9
6	(England) Wes Newton 88.16	8
3	(England) Colin Osborne 88.68	9

Semi-finals (best of 19 legs); 31 January
1	(England) Phil Taylor 99.40	9
21	(Australia) Paul Nicholson 95.86	10
23	(England) Mervyn King 96.32	10
3	(England) Colin Osborne 94.22	8

Final (best of 25 legs); 31 January
21	(Australia) Paul Nicholson 92.75	13
23	(England) Mervyn King 89.74	11

== Statistics ==
Player statistics
Player	Eliminated	Played	Legs Won	Legs Lost	LWAT	100+	140+	180s	High checkout	3-dart average
(Australia) Paul Nicholson	Winner	5	46	34	18	133	61	12	170	94.48
(England) Mervyn King	Final	5	44	29	19	88	83	13	130	97.04
(England) Phil Taylor	Semi-finals	4	32	26	13	90	36	11	160	100.33
(England) Colin Osborne	Semi-finals	4	31	23	12	56	40	13	160	91.24
(England) Colin Lloyd	Quarter-finals	3	21	18	8	56	34	6	130	98.37
(England) Adrian Lewis	Quarter-finals	3	21	21	10	43	25	20	147	97.07
(England) Wayne Jones	Quarter-finals	3	16	16	7	52	22	6	101	89.84
(England) Wes Newton	Quarter-finals	3	22	18	8	48	28	8	124	93.21
(England) Andy Hamilton	Second round	2	13	12	6	29	13	6	84	92.90
(England) Ronnie Baxter	Second round	2	13	13	7	49	16	2	116	92.25
(England) Terry Jenkins	Second round	2	13	13	3	31	19	9	120	92.06
(England) Kevin Painter	Second round	2	10	11	3	20	17	4	81	95.39
(Netherlands) Michael van Gerwen	Second round	2	8	10	4	18	16	2	58	91.89
(England) Mark Walsh	Second round	2	11	12	5	29	12	4	84	88.09
(England) Steve Beaton	Second round	2	11	10	5	27	14	4	95	90.80
(Netherlands) Jelle Klaasen	Second round	2	7	9	3	15	6	3	96	90.12
(Northern Ireland) Brendan Dolan	First round	1	5	6	2	12	4	2	122	88.57
(Netherlands) Vincent van der Voort	First round	1	5	6	1	15	6	0	86	88.44
(England) Jamie Caven	First round	1	2	6	1	9	3	1	36	88.43
(Scotland) Gary Anderson	First round	1	1	6	0	6	7	1	80	88.31
(Netherlands) Co Stompé	First round	1	3	6	2	10	6	3	108	88.12
(England) Tony Eccles	First round	1	2	6	1	12	5	1	50	88.01
(England) Denis Ovens	First round	1	5	6	1	23	5	1	84	92.32
(England) Alan Tabern	First round	1	4	6	1	16	8	2	130	92.01
(Scotland) Robert Thornton	First round	1	3	6	1	8	9	0	121	87.20
(England) Mark Dudbridge	First round	1	5	6	3	9	7	1	80	85.68
(England) Dennis Priestley	First round	1	2	6	0	9	4	1	65	84.30
(Scotland) Peter Wright	First round	1	2	6	0	8	7	0	80	84.23
(England) Peter Manley	First round	1	2	6	1	9	6	2	45	83.98
(England) James Wade	First round	1	5	6	2	11	9	4	103	99.95
(England) Steve Hine	First round	1	4	6	2	15	3	0	120	83.57
(England) Andy Smith	First round	1	2	6	0	9	2	2	25	74.35
