= Ronnie Baxter =

English darts player (born 1961)

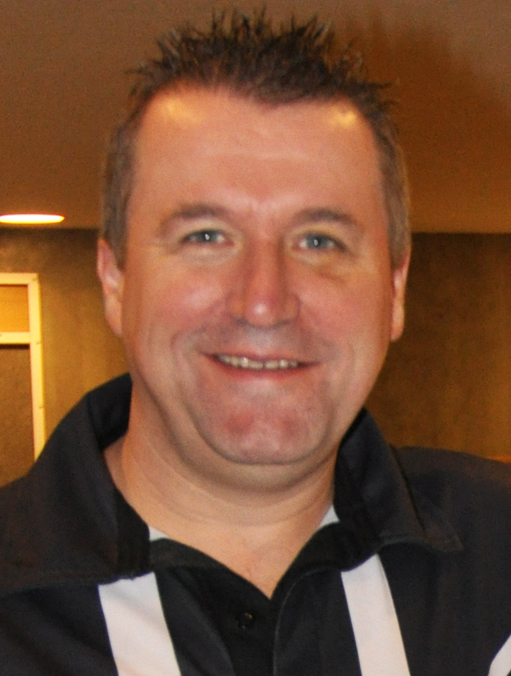
- Baxter in 2009

Personal information
- Nickname: "The Rocket"
- Born: 5 February 1961 (age 65) Blackpool, Lancashire, England

Sport
- Sport: Darts
- Playing since: 1980s
- Darts: 23 gram Tommy's Darts
- Laterality: Right-handed
- Walk-on music: "Don't Stop Me Now" by Queen

Organisation (see split in darts)
- BDO: 1987–2001
- PDC: 2001–2018 (Tour Card: 2011–2018)

WDF major events – best performances
- World Championship: Runner-up: 1999, 2000
- World Masters: Runner-up: 1997
- World Trophy: Semi-final: 2006
- Int. Darts League: Last 16 Group: 2006
- Finder Masters: Semi-final: 2001

PDC premier events – best performances
- World Championship: Quarter-final: 2002, 2010
- World Matchplay: Runner-up: 1998
- World Grand Prix: Semi-final: 2004
- UK Open: Semi-final: 2009
- Grand Slam: Last 16: 2010
- European Championship: Quarter-final: 2008, 2010
- Premier League: 5th: 2006, 2010
- Championship League: Winners Group – 6th: 2012
- Desert Classic: Runner-up: 2002
- US Open/WSoD: Semi-final: 2006
- PC Finals: Semi-final: 2009

WSDT major events – best performances
- World Championship: Last 32: 2023
- World Matchplay: Last 16: 2022

Other tournament wins
- Years
British Matchplay	1992, 1998
British Pentathlon	1997
Denmark Open	1996
Eastbourne Pro	2005, 2006
England GP of Darts Blackpool	2012
Finnish Open	1998
German Open	1995
Hampshire Open	2001
Irish Masters	2003
Isle of Man Open	1996, 1997, 2000
Jersey Festival of Darts	1989
Shoalhaven Classic	2008, 2008
Swiss Open	1997
Syracuse Open	1987
Vauxhall Autumn Open	2001
Welsh Open	1991, 1993
Windy City Open	2007
Winmau Darts Dazzler Batley	2009
Players Championships
2004, 2005, 2008, 2009, 2010, 2011 (×2), 2012
UK Open Regionals/Qualifiers
Regional Final Ireland	2003

Ronnie Baxter (born 5 February 1961) is an English former professional darts player who competed in the British Darts Organisation (BDO) and the Professional Darts Corporation (PDC). Nicknamed "The Rocket" because of his fast throwing style, he reached five major televised finals during his career, including two consecutive BDO World Championship finals in 1999 and 2000. He also reached the finals of the 1998 World Matchplay and the 2002 Las Vegas Desert Classic, but never won a televised major title.

== BDO ==
Baxter began competing in darts during the 1980s, initially playing extensively on the North American circuit. He subsequently established himself on the British and European circuits, winning numerous open tournaments, including the Welsh Open, German Open, Denmark Open, Swiss Open and Finnish Open. He also won the Isle of Man Open on three occasions.

Baxter made his BDO World Championship debut in 1991, defeating Bruno Raes in the first round before losing to Jocky Wilson. In 1992, he was eliminated in the opening round by Bob Anderson. Following the split in professional darts, Baxter entered the 1994 World Championship as the second seed, but lost his opening match to eventual champion John Part. He reached his first World Championship quarter-final in 1996, losing 4–2 to Richie Burnett.

In December 1997, Baxter reached his first major televised final at the Winmau World Masters. He defeated Ted Hankey 3–2 in the semi-finals before losing the final by the same score to Graham Hunt. Despite being seeded second at the 1998 World Championship, he suffered another early exit, losing 3–2 to Peter Johnstone in the first round.

Baxter reached his first World Championship final in 1999. He defeated Richie Burnett, Kevin Painter, Roland Scholten and Andy Fordham on his way to the final against Raymond van Barneveld. Baxter led 3–1 and later 5–4, but van Barneveld recovered to win 6–5 and retain his world title.

He returned to the final in 2000, having defeated Scott Wollaston, Bobby George, Colin Monk and Co Stompé. However, his second consecutive appearance ended in a 6–0 defeat to Ted Hankey. Baxter made his final BDO World Championship appearance in 2001, reaching the quarter-finals before losing 5–3 to Wayne Mardle.

== PDC ==
=== Early career and major finals (1998–2008) ===
Although still competing in the BDO, Baxter made his World Matchplay debut in 1998 at the Winter Gardens in his hometown of Blackpool. He defeated Andy Jenkins, John Ferrell, defending champion Phil Taylor and Chris Mason to reach the final. In the quarter-finals, he recovered from a 9–5 deficit to beat Taylor 13–10.

In the final against Rod Harrington, Baxter led 17–14 and missed a championship dart at double 20. Harrington recovered to level the match and completed a 19–17 victory, denying Baxter the title in one of the tournament's most memorable finals.

Baxter joined the PDC in 2001 and reached the quarter-finals on his debut at the 2002 PDC World Darts Championship. Later that year, he reached the final of the inaugural Las Vegas Desert Classic, defeating Andy Jenkins, John Part and Roland Scholten before losing 3–0 to Phil Taylor.

Over the following years, Baxter remained a regular competitor in major PDC tournaments. He reached the semi-finals of the 2004 World Grand Prix and qualified for the 2006 Premier League Darts, finishing fifth in the league table. He also reached the quarter-finals of the 2008 European Darts Championship.

During this period, Baxter established himself as a successful player on the PDC Pro Tour, collecting multiple Players Championship titles. Despite his consistent appearances in the latter stages of major events, he was unable to add a televised major title to his achievements.

=== Resurgence and later major performances (2009–2013) ===
Baxter enjoyed a resurgence in 2009. He reached the semi-finals of the inaugural 2009 Players Championship Finals, losing 13–2 to Phil Taylor, and also progressed to the semi-finals of the 2009 UK Open, where Taylor defeated him 10–6.

At the 2009 PDC World Darts Championship, Baxter defeated Marko Kantele and Denis Ovens before facing Raymond van Barneveld in the third round. The match went to a deciding leg in the seventh set, with Baxter missing two match darts before van Barneveld secured victory.

In July 2009, Baxter reached another semi-final at the 2009 World Matchplay. Playing in front of his home crowd in Blackpool, he defeated Jelle Klaasen, Alan Tabern and James Wade, beating the latter 16–10 in the quarter-finals. His run ended with a 17–12 semi-final defeat to Terry Jenkins.

Baxter reached the quarter-finals of the 2010 PDC World Darts Championship, defeating Haruki Muramatsu, Gary Anderson and Colin Lloyd before losing 5–0 to van Barneveld. His performances lifted him to sixth in the PDC Order of Merit and secured qualification for the 2010 Premier League Darts. He spent much of the competition in contention for the play-offs, but eventually finished fifth, level on points with fourth-placed Mervyn King.

In June 2012, Baxter won the seventh Players Championship event of the season in Birmingham, defeating reigning world champion Adrian Lewis 6–3 in the final. It was his first PDC ranking title for ten months. He subsequently reached the final of the ninth Players Championship event, losing 6–4 to Dave Chisnall.

At the 2012 World Matchplay, Baxter defeated Chisnall, Dean Winstanley and Justin Pipe to reach the semi-finals. There he lost 17–10 to Phil Taylor, having recovered from a 6–0 deficit to reduce the gap to 8–6. His performance helped him return to the world's top 16. Later that year, he also qualified for the Winners Group of the 2012 Championship League Darts, finishing sixth.

At the 2013 PDC World Darts Championship, Baxter recovered from 3–1 down in sets against Kevin Painter to force a deciding set, but ultimately lost 4–3. He also reached the quarter-finals of the 2013 UK Open, defeating Ken MacNeil, Lee Palfreyman and Jelle Klaasen. Against Raymond van Barneveld, Baxter led 7–4 before eventually losing 10–9 after missing a match dart.

=== Decline and loss of Tour Card (2014–2018) ===
Baxter's results began to decline in the following seasons. At the 2014 PDC World Darts Championship, he lost 3–0 in the opening round to newcomer Ricky Evans. He nevertheless reached the semi-finals of the 2014 German Darts Championship, defeating four opponents before losing 6–4 to Gary Anderson. He also reached five Players Championship quarter-finals during the season.

At the 2015 PDC World Darts Championship, Baxter defeated Daryl Gurney 3–1 in the first round before losing 4–0 to Robert Thornton. He reached the fourth round of the 2015 UK Open, but failed to qualify for the World Matchplay, ending a run of 17 consecutive appearances at the tournament. His best Players Championship result that year was a quarter-final appearance at the 11th event, where he defeated Phil Taylor 6–2 before losing 6–3 to Dave Chisnall. He also failed to qualify for the 2016 PDC World Darts Championship, the first World Championship without him since 1995.

In 2016, Baxter missed the UK Open for the first time since the tournament's inception in 2003. However, he reached the semi-finals of the eighth Players Championship event, recording victories over players including Kim Huybrechts and Simon Whitlock before losing 6–4 to Gerwyn Price. He qualified for the 2016 Players Championship Finals, but was eliminated 6–3 by Daryl Gurney in the opening round.

After the 2017 PDC World Darts Championship, Baxter was ranked 73rd in the PDC Order of Merit and lost his automatic Tour Card eligibility. He entered the 2017 PDC Qualifying School, where he reached the final qualifying round on the last day before losing 5–0 to Kirk Shepherd. Nevertheless, he finished joint third on the Q-School Order of Merit with 15 points, earning a new two-year PDC Tour Card.

During 2017, Baxter reached the fourth round of the UK Open and qualified for the 2017 German Darts Masters, where he was defeated in the first round. He reduced his playing schedule in 2018, entering only 12 of the 22 Players Championship events. His final recorded PDC appearance came at Players Championship 16 in Barnsley on 27 June 2018. He finished the season outside the world's top 64 and lost his Tour Card.

In July 2019, Baxter attended the World Matchplay in Blackpool and stated that he hoped to return to professional competition in 2020 after taking time away from the sport. However, he did not return to the regular PDC circuit.

== World Seniors Darts Tour ==
Baxter returned to televised competitive darts in July 2022 at the inaugural World Seniors Darts Matchplay in Kingston upon Hull. He received a bye into the last 16, where he faced fellow former PDC professional Terry Jenkins. Baxter averaged 75.37 but lost the match 8–5.

In February 2023, Baxter competed at the 2023 World Seniors Darts Championship at the Circus Tavern in Purfleet. He faced Kevin Painter in the first round and was defeated 3–0, winning only one leg during the match.

== World Championship performances ==
=== BDO ===
- 1991: Second round (lost to Jocky Wilson 1–3)
- 1992: First round (lost to Bob Anderson 1–3)
- 1994: First round (lost to John Part 0–3)
- 1996: Quarter-finals (lost to Richie Burnett 2–4)
- 1997: Second round (lost to Mervyn King 2–3)
- 1998: First round (lost to Peter Johnstone 2–3)
- 1999: Runner-up (lost to Raymond van Barneveld 5–6)
- 2000: Runner-up (lost to Ted Hankey 0–6)
- 2001: Quarter-finals (lost to Wayne Mardle 3–5)

=== PDC ===
- 2002: Quarter-finals (lost to Peter Manley 2–6)
- 2003: Third round (lost to Kevin Painter 3–5)
- 2004: Fourth round (lost to Kevin Painter 2–4)
- 2005: Fourth round (lost to Bob Anderson 2–4)
- 2006: First round (lost to Ray Carver 2–3)
- 2007: First round (lost to Adrian Gray 2–3)
- 2008: Second round (lost to Mark Dudbridge 2–4)
- 2009: Third round (lost to Raymond van Barneveld 3–4)
- 2010: Quarter-finals (lost to Raymond van Barneveld 0–5)
- 2011: Second round (lost to Mark Webster 0–4)
- 2012: First round (lost to Steve Farmer 2–3)
- 2013: Second round (lost to Kevin Painter 3–4)
- 2014: First round (lost to Ricky Evans 0–3)
- 2015: Second round (lost to Robert Thornton 0–4)

=== WSDT ===
- 2023: First round (lost to Kevin Painter 0–3)

== Performance timeline ==
=== BDO ===
Tournament	1988	1989	1990	1991	1992	1993	1994	1995	1996	1997	1998	1999	2000	2001	2002	2003	2004	2005	2006	2007
BDO Ranked televised events
World Championship	DNQ			2R	1R	DNQ	1R	DNQ	QF	2R	1R	F	F	QF	PDC					
World Masters	QF	DNQ	QF	2R	Prel.	1R	2R	QF	2R	F	QF	3R	4R	3R	4R	PDC				
European Masters	Not held								1R	Not held										
Zuiderduin Masters	Not held												DNP	SF	PDC					
International Darts League	Not held															DNP			RR	RR
World Darts Trophy	Not held														DNP				SF	RR
News of the World	QF	DNP	Not held						DNP	Not held										

=== WSDT ===
Tournament	2022	2023
WSDT televised events
World Seniors Darts Championship	DNQ	1R
World Seniors Darts Matchplay	2R	DNP

=== PDC ===
Tournament	1998	1999	2000	2001	2002	2003	2004	2005	2006	2007	2008	2009	2010	2011		2012	2013	2014	2015	2016	2017	2018
PDC Ranked televised events
World Championship	BDO				QF	3R	4R	4R	1R	1R	2R	3R	QF	2R		1R	2R	1R	2R	DNQ		
UK Open	Not held					3R	5R	4R	5R	3R	5R	SF	5R	4R		5R	QF	3R	4R	DNQ	4R	DNQ
World Matchplay	F	1R	SF	2R	QF	1R	SF	SF	QF	QF	2R	SF	2R	1R		SF	1R	1R	DNQ			
World Grand Prix	DNP		2R	1R	QF	1R	SF	2R	2R	1R	1R	1R	1R	1R		1R	2R	1R	DNQ			
European Championship	Not held										QF	2R	QF	2R		2R	1R	DNQ				
Grand Slam	Not held									RR	DNQ		2R	DNQ								
Players Championship Finals	Not held											SF	2R	1R	1R	2R	1R	1R	DNQ	1R	DNQ	
PDC Non-ranked televised events
Premier League	Not held							DNP	5th	DNP			5th	DNP								
PDC Past major events
Las Vegas Desert Classic	Not held				F	RR	QF	1R	1R	DNQ		1R	Not held									
World Series of Darts	Not held								SF	Not held												
Championship League	Not held										RR	RR	RR	RR		6th	RR	Not held				
Career statistics
Year-end ranking	Not ranked			12	3	7	6	3	10	14	15	7	8	14		18	19	24	38	61	117	109

==== PDC European Tour ====
Season	1	2	3	4	5	6	7	8	9	10	11	12	13
2012	ADO; 1R	GDC; 3R	EDO; 2R	GDM; 1R	DDM; 2R								
2013	UKM; 3R	EDT; 3R	EDO; 2R	ADO; 3R	GDT; 2R	GDC; 2R	GDM; 2R	DDM; 3R					
2014	GDC; SF	DNQ	GDM; 2R	ADO; 3R	DNQ	EDO; 1R	DNQ	EDT; 1R					
2015	Did not qualify												
2016	DDM; 1R	Did not qualify											
2017	DNQ	GDM; 1R	Did not qualify									DNP	
2018	DNP				DNQ				DNP				

==== PDC Players Championships ====
Season	1	2	3	4	5	6	7	8	9	10	11	12	13	14	15	16	17	18	19	20	21	22	23	24	25	26	27	28	29	30	31	32	33	34	35	36	37
2004	DNP	NEW; QF	DUB; QF	ROT; W	EDI; SF																																
2005	IOW; W	IOW; 2R	DNP	NEW; 4R	DUB; 2R	IRV; 1R	LIS; 1R	LIS; QF																													
2006	GIB; QF	HAY; 2R	DNP	BLA; 3R	NEW; 2R	DUB; 3R	IRV; SF	LIS; 4R	LIS; 2R																												
2007	GIB; SF	GIB; 3R	BSO; F	ANT; 2R	HEN; 4R	HEE; 4R	HAY; 2R	HAY; 1R	LAS; 4R	BLA; 2R	ATL; 3R	DUB; 2R	CHI; W	NEW; 1R	DUB; 4R	IRV; 3R	KIR; QF	KIL; QF	LIS; 3R	LIS; 4R																	
2008	DNP		BRE; 2R	WIG; QF	BSO; 4R	BSO; 4R	TEL; 4R	ANT; SF	GLA; 4R	HEN; 3R	BRI; 4R	BRI; 4R	LAS; F	BLA; F	SHO; 2R	KIT; 4R	ATL; 4R	VEL; 3R	VEL; QF	DUB; 3R	CHI; 1R	NEW; W	NEW; QF	DUB; 2R	DUB; QF	IRV; 3R	IRV; 3R	DIN; 2R	DNP	LEI; 4R	LEI; 4R						
2009	DNP	GIB; 1R	GIB; 2R	GLA; 4R	DNP	IRV; QF	WIG; 1R	BRE; F	COV; 1R	NUL; QF	NUL; 4R	TAU; 4R	DER; SF	NEW; 3R	BAR; 4R	BAR; 3R	DIN; 3R	DIN; QF	LAS; W	DNP	CAN; 3R	ATL; 3R	SAL; 3R	SAL; 1R	DUB; 3R	DUB; 4R	KIL; 4R	DNP		IRV; 3R	IRV; 2R						
2010	GIB; 2R	GIB; 3R	SWI; SF	DER; 3R	GLA; 3R	GLA; 3R	WIG; 1R	CRA; 1R	BLA; 2R	DER; QF	DNP	WIG; 4R	SAL; 3R	SAL; 3R	BAR; 3R	BAR; W	HAA; 2R	HAA; 4R	ATL; 3R	LAS; QF	LAS; 4R	DNP			CRA; 2R	CRA; 4R	NUL; 4R	NUL; 1R	DUB; 4R	DUB; SF	KIL; 4R	BNA; 4R	BNA; SF	BAR; 4R	BAR; SF	DER; 1R	DER; 1R
2011	HAL; 3R	HAL; W	DER; SF	DER; 3R	CRA; QF	CRA; 3R	WNE; 4R	WNE; 4R	CRA; 3R	CRA; 3R	BAR; 1R	BAR; 4R	NUL; 4R	NUL; 4R	CAN; 4R	CAN; W	DER; 2R	DER; 1R	NUL; 2R	NUL; 2R	DUB; 3R	DUB; 3R	KIL; 2R	GLA; 2R	GLA; 3R	BEN; 4R	BEN; 4R	CRA; 3R	CRA; 2R	WIG; SF	WIG; 1R						
2012	BEN; 3R	BEN; 3R	REA; 4R	REA; 3R	CRA; QF	CRA; 2R	BIR; W	BIR; 3R	CRA; SF	CRA; 1R	BAR; 2R	BAR; 1R	DUB; 1R	DUB; 4R	KIL; 1R	KIL; 1R	CRA; 4R	CRA; 1R	BAR; 4R	BAR; 1R																	
2013	WIG; 2R	WIG; QF	WIG; 2R	WIG; 4R	CRA; 1R	CRA; 2R	BAR; 2R	BAR; 1R	DUB; 2R	DUB; 4R	KIL; 2R	KIL; 3R	WIG; 4R	WIG; 3R	BAR; 4R	BAR; 3R																					
2014	BAR; QF	BAR; 4R	CRA; QF	CRA; 3R	WIG; 1R	WIG; 3R	WIG; QF	WIG; 2R	CRA; 1R	CRA; QF	COV; QF	COV; 2R	CRA; 1R	CRA; 2R	DUB; 1R	DUB; 3R	CRA; 4R	CRA; 3R	COV; 3R	COV; 1R																	
2015	BAR; 1R	BAR; 1R	BAR; 1R	BAR; 1R	BAR; 2R	COV; 1R	COV; 1R	COV; 1R	CRA; 1R	CRA; 1R	BAR; QF	BAR; 4R	WIG; 2R	WIG; 1R	BAR; 1R	BAR; 2R	DUB; 1R	DUB; 1R	COV; 1R	COV; 1R																	
2016	BAR; 1R	BAR; 2R	BAR; 1R	BAR; 1R	BAR; 1R	BAR; 1R	BAR; 2R	COV; SF	COV; 1R	BAR; 2R	BAR; 1R	BAR; 3R	BAR; 4R	BAR; 2R	BAR; 2R	BAR; 2R	DUB; 1R	DUB; 4R	BAR; 1R	BAR; 3R																	
2017	BAR; 2R	BAR; 2R	BAR; 1R	BAR; 1R	MIL; 2R	MIL; 1R	BAR; 1R	BAR; 2R	WIG; 2R	WIG; 1R	MIL; 1R	MIL; 1R	WIG; 1R	WIG; 1R	BAR; 1R	BAR; 1R	BAR; 1R	BAR; 1R	Did not participate																		
2018	BAR; 1R	BAR; 1R	Did not participate				BAR; 2R	BAR; 1R	WIG; 2R	WIG; 2R	MIL; 1R	MIL; 1R	WIG; 1R	WIG; 1R	BAR; 2R	BAR; 2R	Did not participate																				

Performance Table Legend
W	Won the tournament	F	Finalist	SF	Semifinalist	QF	Quarterfinalist	#R; RR; Prel.	Lost in # round Round-robin; Preliminary round	DQ	Disqualified
DNQ	Did not qualify	DNP	Did not participate	WD	Withdrew	NH	Tournament not held	#R; RR; Prel.	Lost in # round Round-robin; Preliminary round	NYF	Not yet founded

=== BDO major finals: 3 (3 runners-up) ===
Legend
World Championship (0–2)
Winmau World Masters (0–1)

Outcome	No.	Year	Championship	Opponent in the final	Score (Note: (l) = score in legs, (s) = score in sets.)
Runner-up	1.	1997	World Masters	(Australia) Graham Hunt	2–3 (s)
Runner-up	2.	1999	World Championship	(Netherlands) Raymond van Barneveld	5–6 (s)
Runner-up	3.	2000	World Championship (2)	(England) Ted Hankey	0–6 (s)

=== PDC major finals: 2 (2 runner-up) ===
Outcome	No.	Year	Championship	Opponent in the final	Score (Note: (l) = score in legs, (s) = score in sets.)
Runner-up	1.	1998	World Matchplay	Rod Harrington	17–19 (l)
Runner-up	2.	2002	Las Vegas Desert Classic	Phil Taylor	0–3 (s)
