= 2007 PDC Pro Tour =

The 2007 PDC Pro Tour was a series of non-televised darts tournaments organised by the Professional Darts Corporation (PDC). They consisted of Professional Dart Players Association (PDPA) Players Championships and UK Open Regional Finals.

== Prize money ==
Stage	Players Championships and UK Open Qualifiers
Second round	£75
Third round	£150
Fourth round	£300
Quarter-finals	£600
Semi-finals	£1,250
Final	£2,500
Winner	£5,000

== Players Championships ==
(All matches – Best of 5 sets, Best of 3 legs per set)

- Stan James Players Championship at the Queensway Club, Gibraltar on 20 January

Quarter-finals		Semi-finals		Final
(Netherlands) Raymond van Barneveld	3
(England) Wayne Mardle	1	(Netherlands) Raymond van Barneveld	3
(England) Ronnie Baxter	3	(England) Ronnie Baxter	1
(Netherlands) Roland Scholten	1			(Netherlands) Raymond van Barneveld	3
(England) Adrian Lewis	3			(England) Adrian Lewis	1
(England) Colin Lloyd	2	(England) Adrian Lewis	3
(England) Peter Manley	3	(England) Peter Manley	1
(England) Wayne Jones	1

Final (Netherlands) Raymond van Barneveld 3–1 Adrian Lewis (England) (2–0, 2–1, 0–2, 2–0)

- StanJames.com Players Championship at the Queensway Club, Gibraltar on 21 January

Quarter-finals		Semi-finals		Final
(England) Alan Warriner-Little	3
(Netherlands) Michael van Gerwen	1	(England) Alan Warriner-Little	1
(England) Andy Hamilton	3	(England) Andy Hamilton	3
(England) Terry Jenkins	0			(England) Andy Hamilton	3
(England) Colin Lloyd	3			(England) Colin Lloyd	1
(England) Adrian Lewis	1	(England) Colin Lloyd	3
(England) Colin Osborne	3	(England) Colin Osborne	1
(England) Peter Manley	2

Final (England) Andy Hamilton 3–1 Colin Lloyd (England) (2–0, 2–0, 1–2, 2–0)

- Partypoker.net Players Championship at the Ramada Hotel, Bad Soden, Frankfurt on 24 March

Quarter-finals		Semi-finals		Final
(Netherlands) Raymond van Barneveld	3
(England) Andy Hamilton	2	(Netherlands) Raymond van Barneveld	3
(Netherlands) Roland Scholten	3	(Netherlands) Roland Scholten	1
(Wales) Sean Palfrey	2			(Netherlands) Raymond van Barneveld	3
(England) Colin Lloyd	3			(England) Ronnie Baxter	1
(England) James Wade	0	(England) Colin Lloyd	1
(England) Ronnie Baxter	3	(England) Ronnie Baxter	3
(England) Mervyn King	2

Final (Netherlands) Raymond van Barneveld 3–1 Ronnie Baxter (England) (2–0, 2–0, 1–2, 2–0)

- Antwerp Darts Trophy (Players Championship) in Antwerp on 15 April

Quarter-finals		Semi-finals		Final
(England) Andy Hamilton	3
(England) Steve Brown	1	(England) Andy Hamilton	2
(England) Terry Jenkins	3	(England) Terry Jenkins	3
(England) Colin Osborne	2			(England) Terry Jenkins	3
(England) Colin Lloyd	3			(England) Colin Lloyd	1
(England) Wayne Mardle	0	(England) Colin Lloyd	3
(England) Adrian Gray	3	(England) Adrian Gray	2
(England) Wayne Jones	1

Final (England) Terry Jenkins 3–1 Colin Lloyd (England) (0–2, 2–0, 2–1, 2–1)

- Open Holland Masters (Players Championship) in Schiedam on 29 April

Quarter-finals		Semi-finals		Final
(England) James Wade	3
(England) Chris Mason	1	(England) James Wade	3
(Wales) Barrie Bates	3	(Wales) Barrie Bates	0
(Netherlands) Erwin Extercatte	0			(England) James Wade	0
(England) Peter Manley	3			(England) Peter Manley	3
(England) Wayne Mardle	0	(England) Peter Manley	3
(England) Terry Jenkins	3	(England) Terry Jenkins	2
(Netherlands) Roland Scholten	2

Final (England) Peter Manley 3–0 James Wade (England) (2–1, 2–0, 2–0)

- Thialf Darts Trophy (Players Championship) in Heerenveen on 3 June

Quarter-finals		Semi-finals		Final
(Netherlands) Leroy Kwadijk	3
(England) James Wade	2	(Netherlands) Leroy Kwadijk	0
(Netherlands) Roland Scholten	3	(Netherlands) Roland Scholten	3
(England) Kevin Painter	0			(Netherlands) Roland Scholten	3
(Canada) John Part	3			(England) Chris Mason	1
(Netherlands) Jelle Klaasen	2	(Canada) John Part	2
(England) Chris Mason	3	(England) Chris Mason	3
(England) Adrian Lewis	2

- Players Championship at Hayling Island on 16 June

Quarter-finals		Semi-finals		Final
(England) Steve Beaton	3
(England) Colin Osborne	0	(England) Steve Beaton	2
(England) Terry Jenkins	3	(England) Terry Jenkins	3
(Netherlands) Michael van Gerwen	2			(England) Terry Jenkins	3
(England) Mark Dudbridge	3			(England) Wes Newton	0
(England) Dennis Priestley	0	(England) Mark Dudbridge	1
(England) Wes Newton	3	(England) Wes Newton	3
(England) Steve Brown	0

- Players Championship at Hayling Island on 17 June

Quarter-finals		Semi-finals		Final
(England) Mervyn King	3
(England) Kevin McDine	0	(England) Mervyn King	3
(England) Tony Eccles	3	(England) Tony Eccles	2
(Wales) Barrie Bates	1			(England) Mervyn King	1
(England) Dennis Priestley	3			(Canada) John Part	3
(England) Mark Dudbridge	0	(England) Dennis Priestley	2
(Canada) John Part	3	(Canada) John Part	3
(England) Peter Manley	1

- Players Championship at Mandalay Bay Resort and Casino, Las Vegas, Nevada on 1 July

Quarter-finals		Semi-finals		Final
(England) Mervyn King	3
(United States) Ray Carver	2	(England) Mervyn King	0
(England) Terry Jenkins	3	(England) Terry Jenkins	3
(Wales) Barrie Bates	0			(England) Terry Jenkins	2
(Netherlands) Raymond van Barneveld	3			(Netherlands) Raymond van Barneveld	3
(Netherlands) Roland Scholten	0	(Netherlands) Raymond van Barneveld	3
(England) Dennis Priestley	3	(England) Dennis Priestley	0
(England) Colin Lloyd	2

Final (Netherlands) Raymond van Barneveld 3–2 Terry Jenkins (England) (2–1, 0–2, 2–0, 1–2, 2–1)

- Bobby Bourne Memorial Players Championship at Winter Gardens, Blackpool, on 21 July

Quarter-finals		Semi-finals		Final
(England) Phil Taylor	3
(Canada) John Part	1	(England) Phil Taylor	3
(Wales) Wayne Atwood	3	(Wales) Wayne Atwood	2
(Wales) Barrie Bates	0			(England) Phil Taylor	3
(England) Adrian Lewis	3			(England) Adrian Lewis	1
(Netherlands) Raymond van Barneveld	1	(England) Adrian Lewis	3
(England) Alan Tabern	3	(England) Alan Tabern	0
(England) Dennis Priestley	1

Final (England) Phil Taylor 3–1 Adrian Lewis (England) (2–0, 1–2, 2–0, 2–0)

- Peachtree Open (Players Championship) in Atlanta, Georgia, on 26 August

Quarter-finals		Semi-finals		Final
(England) James Wade	3
(Canada) John Part	1	(England) James Wade	3
(Netherlands) Vincent van der Voort	3	(Netherlands) Vincent van der Voort	0
(England) Colin Osborne	1			(England) James Wade	2
(England) Wayne Mardle	3			(England) Wayne Mardle	3
(England) Alan Warriner-Little	1	(England) Wayne Mardle	3
(England) Denis Ovens	3	(England) Denis Ovens	2
(Netherlands) Roland Scholten	1

- Ireland Open Classic (Players Championship) at the Royal Hotel, Castlebar, County Mayo on 9 September

Quarter-finals		Semi-finals		Final
(England) Denis Ovens	3
(England) Kevin Painter	2	(England) Denis Ovens	3
(England) Adrian Lewis	3	(England) Adrian Lewis	0
(England) Alan Tabern	1			(England) Denis Ovens	3
(England) Mark Walsh	3			(England) Colin Osborne	0
(England) Wayne Jones	1	(England) Mark Walsh	0
(England) Colin Osborne	3	(England) Colin Osborne	3
(Netherlands) Michael van Gerwen	2

Final (England) Denis Ovens 3–0 Colin Osborne (England) (2–1, 2–1, 2–1)

- Windy City Open (Players Championship) at the Holiday Inn, Chicago, Illinois on 16 September

Quarter-finals		Semi-finals		Final
(England) James Wade	3
(England) Adrian Gray	0	(England) James Wade	3
(England) Colin Lloyd	3	(England) Colin Lloyd	1
(Netherlands) Vincent van der Voort	1			(England) James Wade	1
(England) Kevin Painter	3			(England) Ronnie Baxter	3
(England) Steve Brown	2	(England) Kevin Painter	2
(England) Ronnie Baxter	3	(England) Ronnie Baxter	3
(England) Peter Manley	1

- Players Championship at the Newport Centre, Newport on 22 September

Quarter-finals		Semi-finals		Final
(England) Alex Roy	3
(England) Andy Smith	1	(England) Alex Roy	3
(England) Alan Tabern	3	(England) Alan Tabern	2
(England) Denis Ovens	2			(England) Alex Roy	0
(Netherlands) Raymond van Barneveld	3			(Netherlands) Raymond van Barneveld	3
(Northern Ireland) John MaGowan	0	(Netherlands) Raymond van Barneveld	3
(England) Wayne Mardle	3	(England) Wayne Mardle	1
(England) Mervyn King	1

Final (Netherlands) Raymond van Barneveld 3–0 Alex Roy (England) (2–1, 2–1, 2–0)

- Players Championship at the City West Hotel, Dublin on 6 October

Quarter-finals		Semi-finals		Final
(England) Phil Taylor	3
(England) Tony Eccles	1	(England) Phil Taylor	3
(England) Chris Mason	3	(England) Chris Mason	2
(England) Terry Jenkins	2			(England) Phil Taylor	3
(England) Adrian Lewis	3			(England) James Wade	0
(England) Alex Roy	1	(England) Adrian Lewis	2
(England) James Wade	3	(England) James Wade	3
(England) Mervyn King	0

- Players Championship at the Magnum Centre, Irvine on 20 October

Quarter-finals		Semi-finals		Final
(Scotland) Jason Clark	3
(England) Dennis Priestley	2	(Scotland) Jason Clark	1
(England) Andy Smith	3	(England) Andy Smith	3
(England) Denis Ovens	1			(England) Andy Smith	3
(England) James Wade	3			(England) James Wade	0
(England) Dave Askew	0	(England) James Wade	3
(England) Tony Randell	3	(England) Tony Randell	0
(England) Wayne Mardle	2

Final (England) Andy Smith 3–0 James Wade (England) (2–1, 2–0, 2–1)

- Players Championship at the SeePark, Kirchheim on 27 October

Quarter-finals		Semi-finals		Final
(England) Wayne Mardle	3
(Netherlands) Raymond van Barneveld	1	(England) Wayne Mardle	3
(England) Kevin Painter	3	(England) Kevin Painter	0
(Netherlands) Vincent van der Voort	1			(England) Wayne Mardle	3
(England) James Wade	3			(England) James Wade	1
(England) Ronnie Baxter	1	(England) James Wade	3
(England) Alan Tabern	3	(England) Alan Tabern	1
(England) Andy Jenkins	1

Final (England) Wayne Mardle 3–1 James Wade (England) (2–0, 1–2, 2–0, 2–1)

- John McEvoy Gold Dart Classic (Players Championship) at National Events Centre in Killarney on 4 November

Quarter-finals		Semi-finals		Final
(England) Colin Lloyd	3
(England) Colin Monk	0	(England) Colin Lloyd	1
(Netherlands) Jelle Klaasen	3	(Netherlands) Jelle Klaasen	3
(England) Ronnie Baxter	0			(Netherlands) Jelle Klaasen	3
(Netherlands) Vincent van der Voort	3			(Netherlands) Vincent van der Voort	2
(England) Colin Osborne	1	(Netherlands) Vincent van der Voort	3
(England) Bob Anderson	3	(England) Bob Anderson	1
(England) Dave Askew	0

Final (Netherlands) Jelle Klaasen 3–2 Vincent van der Voort (Netherlands) (1–2, 1–2, 2–0, 2–1, 2–1)

- Players Championship at Golden Tulip Hotel in Lisse on 10 November.

Quarter-finals		Semi-finals		Final
(England) Phil Taylor	3
(England) Wayne Mardle	0	(England) Phil Taylor	3
(Northern Ireland) Ray Farrell	3	(Northern Ireland) Ray Farrell	0
(Canada) John Part	2			(England) Phil Taylor	3
(England) Alan Tabern	3			(England) Chris Mason	0
(England) Andy Hamilton	1	(England) Chris Mason	3
(England) Chris Mason	3	(England) Alan Tabern	0
(England) Dennis Priestley	2

Final (England) Phil Taylor 3–0 Chris Mason (England) (2–1, 2–0, 2–0)

- Players Championship at Golden Tulip Hotel in Lisse on 11 November.

Quarter-finals		Semi-finals		Final
(England) Phil Taylor	3
(England) Wayne Mardle	2	(England) Phil Taylor	3
(Canada) John Part	3	(Canada) John Part	2
(Netherlands) Vincent van der Voort	1			(England) Phil Taylor	3
(Netherlands) Raymond van Barneveld	3			(Netherlands) Raymond van Barneveld	2
(England) Andy Hamilton	1	(Netherlands) Raymond van Barneveld	3
(England) Adrian Lewis	3	(England) Adrian Lewis	1
(England) James Wade	1

Final (England) Phil Taylor 3–2 Raymond van Barneveld (Netherlands) (1–2, 2–1, 2–1, 1–2, 2–0)

== UK Open Regional Finals ==
(Quarter-finals best of 9 legs)
(Semi-finals and Finals best of 3 sets, 5 legs per set)

Three of the eight 2007 UK Open qualifying events took place during 2006.

- Blue Square UK Open Welsh Regional Final on 24 September 2006

Quarter-finals		Semi-finals		Final
(England) Colin Lloyd	5
(England) Andy Hamilton	2	(England) Colin Lloyd	0
(England) Phil Taylor	5	(England) Phil Taylor	2
(England) James Wade	1			(England) Phil Taylor	2
(Netherlands) Raymond van Barneveld	5			(England) Adrian Lewis	0
(England) Terry Jenkins	4	(Netherlands) Raymond van Barneveld	0
(England) Adrian Lewis	5	(England) Adrian Lewis	2
(England) Kevin Painter	1

- Blue Square UK Open Irish Regional Final on 22 October 2006

Quarter-finals		Semi-finals		Final
(Netherlands) Raymond van Barneveld	5
(England) Mark Lawrence	0	(Netherlands) Raymond van Barneveld	2
(Netherlands) Roland Scholten	5	(Netherlands) Roland Scholten	0
(England) Andy Hamilton	4			(Netherlands) Raymond van Barneveld	2
(England) Colin Lloyd	5			(England) Colin Lloyd	1
(England) Phil Taylor	2	(England) Colin Lloyd	2
(England) Terry Jenkins	5	(England) Terry Jenkins	1
(Republic of Ireland) Mick McGowan	4

- Blue Square UK Open Scottish Regional Final on 5 November 2006

Quarter-finals		Semi-finals		Final
(England) Dennis Priestley	5
(England) Peter Manley	2	(England) Dennis Priestley	0
(Netherlands) Raymond van Barneveld	5	(Netherlands) Raymond van Barneveld	2
(England) Colin Lloyd	3			(Netherlands) Raymond van Barneveld	2
(Republic of Ireland) Mick McGowan	5			(Wales) Barrie Bates	0
(Netherlands) Roland Scholten	1	(Republic of Ireland) Mick McGowan	1
(Wales) Barrie Bates	5	(Wales) Barrie Bates	2
(Scotland) Robert Thornton	4

- Blue Square UK Open North-East Regional Final at Park Hotel, Tynemouth on 6 January 2007

Quarter-finals		Semi-finals		Final
(Netherlands) Roland Scholten	5
(England) Andy Hamilton	3	(Netherlands) Roland Scholten	2
(England) Alan Tabern	5	(England) Alan Tabern	1
(England) James Wade	4			(Netherlands) Roland Scholten	0
(England) Terry Jenkins	5			(Netherlands) Raymond van Barneveld	2
(England) Andy Jenkins	4	(England) Terry Jenkins	1
(Netherlands) Raymond van Barneveld	5	(Netherlands) Raymond van Barneveld	2
(England) Denis Ovens	0

Final (Netherlands) Raymond van Barneveld 2–0 Roland Scholten (Netherlands) (3–0, 3–1)

- Blue Square UK Open South-West Regional Final at the Talbot Inn, Keynsham on 11 February

Quarter-finals		Semi-finals		Final
(England) Andy Hamilton	5
(Northern Ireland) Brendan Dolan	1	(England) Andy Hamilton	0
(England) Dennis Priestley	5	(England) Dennis Priestley	2
(England) Martyn Turner	1			(England) Dennis Priestley	2
(England) James Wade	5			(England) James Wade	0
(England) Steve Smith	3	(England) James Wade	2
(England) Tony Eccles	5	(England) Tony Eccles	0
(England) Colin Osborne	3

Final (England) Dennis Priestley 2–0 James Wade (England) (3–2, 3–0)

- Blue Square UK Open Southern Regional Final at the Torch, Wembley, North London on 4 March

Quarter-finals		Semi-finals		Final
(England) Colin Lloyd	5
(England) Steve Beaton	3	(England) Colin Lloyd	1
(England) Phil Taylor	5	(England) Phil Taylor	2
(England) Dennis Priestley	0			(England) Phil Taylor	2
(England) Wayne Mardle	5			(England) Wayne Mardle	0
(England) Mervyn King	4	(England) Wayne Mardle	2
(Netherlands) Vincent van der Voort	5	(Netherlands) Vincent van der Voort	0
(England) Terry Jenkins	2

Final (England) Phil Taylor 2–0 Wayne Mardle (England) (3–2, 3–0)

- Blue Square UK Open North-West Regional Final at Bigwigs, Sale, Greater Manchester on 18 March

Quarter-finals		Semi-finals		Final
(England) Steve Hine	5
(England) Denis Ovens	1	(England) Steve Hine	0
(England) Terry Jenkins	5	(England) Terry Jenkins	2
(Northern Ireland) John MaGowan	3			(England) Terry Jenkins	0
(England) Colin Osborne	5			(England) James Wade	2
(England) Wayne Mardle	2	(England) Colin Osborne	0
(England) James Wade	5	(England) James Wade	2
(England) Phil Taylor	2

Final (England) James Wade 2–0 Terry Jenkins (England) (3–0, 3–1)

- Blue Square UK Open Midlands Regional Final at the Festival, Trowell, Nottingham on 1 April

Quarter-finals		Semi-finals		Final
(England) Andy Hamilton	5
(England) Mervyn King	4	(England) Andy Hamilton	2
(England) Wayne Mardle	5	(England) Wayne Mardle	0
(England) Steve Hine	1			(England) Andy Hamilton	2
(England) James Wade	5			(England) James Wade	0
(Wales) Barrie Bates	3	(England) James Wade	2
(England) Kevin McDine	5	(England) Kevin McDine	0
(England) Jimmy Mann	4

Final (England) Andy Hamilton 2–0 James Wade (England) (3–2, 3–1)

== German Darts Corporation ==
The German Darts Corporation rankings are calculated from events across Germany, Austria and Switzerland. The top player in the rankings automatically qualifies for the 2008 World Championship.

No.	Date	Also known as	Winner	Legs	Runner-up	Ref.
1	Saturday 24 February	GDC Ramada Hotel Koln	Michael Rosenauer (Germany)	beat	(Germany) Jyhan Artut	
2	Sunday 15 April	GDC Wiesbaden	Mensur Suljović (Austria)	3–0	(Austria) Dietmar Burger	
3	Saturday 26 May	GDC Halle 1	Mensur Suljović (Austria)	beat	(Austria) Dietmar Burger	
4	Sunday 27 May	GDC Halle 2	Michael Rosenauer (Germany)	beat	(Germany) Marko Puls	
5	Saturday 23 June	GDC Salzdetfurth	Michael Rosenauer (Germany)	beat	(Austria) Mensur Suljović	
6	Saturday 18 August	GDC Hurth bei Koln	Mensur Suljović (Austria)	beat	(Germany) Michael Rosenauer	
7	Saturday 29 September	GDC Koln bei Hurth	Michael Rosenauer (Germany)	beat	(Austria) Mensur Suljović	

== Australian Grand Prix Pro Tour ==
The Australian Grand Prix rankings are calculated from events across Australia. The top player in the rankings automatically qualifies for the 2008 World Championship.

No.	Date	Also known as	Winner	Legs	Runner-up	Ref.
1	Saturday 17 March	Wagga Classic 1	Simon Whitlock (Australia)	beat	(Australia) Shane Haddy	
2	Sunday 18 March	Wagga Classic 2	Simon Whitlock (Australia)	beat	(Australia) Brian Roach	
3	Sunday 22 April	Condobolin Classic	Steve MacArthur (Australia)	6–5	(Australia) Glen Power	
4	Sunday 6 May	Nanango Open	Russell Homer (Australia)	beat	(Australia) Peter Corcoran	
5	Sunday 3 June	Goulburn Open	Simon Whitlock (Australia)	6–0	(Australia) Russell Stewart	
6	Saturday 9 June	Oak Flats Soundwaves Open	Simon Whitlock (Australia)	beat	(Australia) Russell Stewart	
7	Sunday 10 June	Russell Stewart Classic	Simon Whitlock (Australia)	6–1	(Australia) Steve McArthur	
8	Sunday 24 June	Mittagong RSL Open	Simon Whitlock (Australia)	6–0	(Australia) Mike Bonser	
9	Sunday 22 July	Southern Illawarra Open	Simon Whitlock (Australia)	beat	(Australia) Glen Power	
10	Sunday 29 July	Punchbowl Open	Glen Power (Australia)	beat	(Australia) Dave Fitzpatrick	
11	Sunday 5 August	Shoalhaven Classic	Glen Power (Australia)	6–5	(Wales) Richie Burnett	
12	Sunday 12 August	William Cross Pro Am	James Wade (England)	beat	(England) Andy Jenkins	
13	Sunday 26 August	Mid North Classic	Craig Atze (Australia)	beat	(Australia) Andrew Townes	
14	Saturday 15 September	Inland Championship	Andrew Townes (Australia)	beat	(Australia) Barry Jouannet Jr	
15	Sunday 16 September	Broken Hill Legion Club Championship	Glen Power (Australia)	beat	(Australia) Rob Modra	
16	Sunday 23 September	Australian Open	Glen Power (Australia)	10–7	(Australia) Pat Orreal	
17	Sunday 7 October	Gaels Club Open	Pat Orreal (Australia)	beat	(Australia) Brian Roach	
18	Sunday 14 October	Pine Rivers Open	Simon Whitlock (Australia)	7–2	(Australia) Glen Power	
19	Wednesday 12 December	DPA Australian Singles	Paul Nicholson (Australia)	beat	(Australia) Brian Roach	
20	Saturday 15 December	DPA Wattle Time	Steve MacArthur (Australia)	8–7	(Australia) Dave Anderson	
21	Sunday 16 December	DPA Coota	Glen Power (Australia)	6–5	(Australia) Jim Lynn	

== Other PDC tournaments ==
The PDC also held a number of other tournaments during 2007. These were mainly smaller events with low prize money, and some had eligibility restrictions. All of these tournaments were non-ranking.

Date	Event	Winner	Score	Runner-Up
24 February	West Tyrone Open	(England) Lionel Sams	8–4	(Northern Ireland) Ray Farrell
25 February	West Tyrone Classic	(Northern Ireland) Ray Farrell	8–7	(Netherlands) Bert Vlaardingerbroek
14 April	Antwerp Open	(England) Terry Jenkins	beat	(England) Colin Lloyd
28 April	Open Holland	(Netherlands) Michael van Gerwen	3–1	(England) Colin Osborne
24 February	PDC World New Zealand Qualifying Event	(New Zealand) Alan Bolton	beat	(New Zealand) Wayne Carey
23 September	Australian Open	(Australia) Glen Power	10–7	(Australia) Pat Orreal
29 September	Emperors Palace South African Open	(South Africa) Charles Losper	4–0	(South Africa) Lodewyk Marais
30 September	Emperors Palace South African Masters	(England) Phil Taylor	8–6	(Netherlands) Raymond van Barneveld
28 October	Oceanic Masters	(New Zealand) Warren Parry	8–7	(Australia) Brian Roach
3 November	Gleneagle Irish Masters	(England) Mark Walsh	6–5	(Netherlands) Vincent van der Voort
14 November	Caribbean and South American Masters	(Barbados) Anthony Forde	beat	(Trinidad and Tobago) Vivekanand Dyal
18 November	Gleneagle Irish Classic	(Republic of Ireland) Jacko Barry	6–3	(Republic of Ireland) James Keogh
19 November	Gleneagle Irish Open	(Netherlands) Raymond van Barneveld	6–5	(England) Phil Taylor
