= 1998 World Matchplay =

Tournament information
- Dates: 27 July–1 August 1998
- Venue: Winter Gardens
- Location: Blackpool
- Country: England
- Organisation(s): PDC
- Format: Legs
- Prize fund: £58,000
- Winner's share: £14,000
- High checkout: 167 (England) Alan Warriner

Champion(s)
- (England) Rod Harrington

The 1998 World Matchplay was a darts tournament held in the Empress Ballroom at the Winter Gardens, Blackpool. The tournament ran from 27 July–1 August 1998, and was won by Rod Harrington.

A classic final between Harrington and Ronnie Baxter was characterised with deadly finishing from Baxter, who led the final for most of the way, and Harrington's stubbornness in clinging on and keeping the match neck-and-neck. However, Harrington eventually trailed 14–17 and was only 1 leg from defeat. Baxter had a championship dart at double 20 in the 33rd leg but missed. At 17-17, a moment of significant darting history occurred when Harrington took out 125 via treble 15 and two consecutive double 20s. The standard check out route on 80 with two darts in hand had been, up to this point, almost invariably treble 20 and double ten. From then on, it would become more common to see players attempt the Harrington route. With Baxter (who had looked likely to regain the lead) demoralised, Harrington maintained a clear lead throughout the next leg, and sealed the title on double five.

Phil Taylor was the reigning champion going into the tournament, but lost 10-13 to Baxter in the quarter finals. Taylor had led 9-5 and 10-8.

== Prize money ==
The prize fund was £58,000.

Position (no. of players)		Prize money (Total: £58,000)
Winner	(1)	£14,000
Runner-Up	(1)	£7,000
Semi-finalists	(2)	£3,500
Quarter-finalists	(4)	£2,000
Second round	(8)	£1,250
First round	(16)	£750

== Seeds ==
There were eight seeds for the competition.

1. (England) Rod Harrington
2. (England) Alan Warriner
3. (England) Phil Taylor
4. (England) Peter Manley
5. (England) Peter Evison
6. (England) Dennis Priestley
7. (Canada) John Part
8. (United States) Steve Brown

== Results ==
Players in bold denote match winners.

**First round** (best of 15 legs); 26–27 July
1	(England) **Rod Harrington** 92.04	**8**
(England) Kevin Spiolek 86.79	4
(United States) **Gary Mawson** 89.82	**9**
(United States) Paul Lim 88.32	7
8	(United States) **Steve Brown** 87.09	**8**
(England) Dennis Smith 83.55	4
(England) **Bob Anderson** 85.62	**8**
(England) Cliff Lazarenko 81.75	2
5	(England) Peter Evison 95.64	4
(England) **Keith Deller** 94.80	**8**
(England) **Mick Manning** 91.32	**9**
(England) Reg Harding 89.70	7
4	(England) **Peter Manley** 91.02	**8**
(England) Ritchie Gardner 83.73	5
(Scotland) **Jamie Harvey** 87.15	**8**
(England) Steve Raw 91.08	6
2	(England) **Alan Warriner** 92.46	**8**
(England) Harry Robinson 78.00	2
(England) **Steve Beaton** 87.30	**8**
(England) Shayne Burgess 87.06	4
7	(Canada) John Part 87.18	5
(England) **Chris Mason** 90.78	**8**
(United States) **Gerald Verrier** 76.14	8
(England) Eric Bristow 73.44	5
6	(England) Dennis Priestley 90.45	7
(England) **John Ferrell** 83.34	**9**
(England) **Ronnie Baxter** 89.34	**14**
(England) Andy Jenkins 81.75	12
3	(England) **Phil Taylor** 96.18	**8**
(England) Graeme Stoddart 80.10	1
(England) **Robbie Widdows**	**8**
(England) John Lowe	6

**Second round** (best of 15 legs); 28 July
1	(England) **Rod Harrington** 91.32	**8**
(United States) Gary Mawson 86.73	6
8	(United States) Steve Brown 93.96	4
(England) **Bob Anderson** 92.13	**8**
(England) **Keith Deller** 81.12	**8**
(England) Mick Manning 90.21	6
4	(England) **Peter Manley** 90.99	**8**
(Scotland) Jamie Harvey 92.16	6
2	(England) Alan Warriner 93.69	7
(England) **Steve Beaton** 88.95	**9**
(England) **Chris Mason** 77.61	**8**
(United States) Gerald Verrier 68.19	3
(England) John Ferrell 87.72	5
(England) **Ronnie Baxter** 93.81	**8**
3	(England) **Phil Taylor**	**8**
(England) Robbie Widdows	2

**Quarter-finals** (best of 25 legs); 29–30 July
1	(England) **Rod Harrington** 92.04	**14**
(England) Bob Anderson 89.88	12
(England) **Keith Deller** 84.36	**13**
4	(England) Peter Manley 89.07	9
(England) Steve Beaton 89.07	6
(England) **Chris Mason** 94.20	**13**
(England) **Ronnie Baxter** 97.05	**13**
3	(England) Phil Taylor 99.48	10

**Semi-finals** (best of 25 legs); 31 July
1	(England) **Rod Harrington** 92.82	**13**
(England) Keith Deller 82.65	10
(England) Chris Mason 97.74	11
(England) **Ronnie Baxter** 97.38	**13**

**Final** (best of 35 legs); 1 August
1	(England) **Rod Harrington** 95.04	**19**
(England) Ronnie Baxter 94.08	17
