= Pat Orreal =

Australian darts player

Personal information
- Full name: Patrick Orreal
- Nickname: "Choppa"
- Born: 17 March 1964 (age 62) Brisbane, Australia
- Home town: Brisbane, Australia

Sport
- Sport: Darts
- Playing since: 1988
- Darts: 23g
- Laterality: Right-handed
- Walk-on music: "Need You Tonight" by INXS

Organisation (see split in darts)
- BDO: 2010–2017
- PDC: 2005–2010

PDC premier events – best performances
- Grand Slam: Last 16: 2007

Other tournament wins
- Tournament: Years
- Gales Club Open Sunshine State Classic Australian Masters Redcliffe Darts Open: 2007; 2010; 2010, 2011; 2013

Patrick Orreal (born 17 March 1964) is an Australian former professional darts player.

== Career ==
Orreal qualified for the inaugural Grand Slam of Darts for reaching the final of the PDC Australian Open where he lost to Glen Power. The result meant that Power had initially qualified for the event but was forced to withdraw due to visa problems and Orreal replaced him. He reached the last 16 of the 2007 Grand Slam of Darts, defeating Niels de Ruiter and Phill Nixon to finish second in his group before losing to Jelle Klaasen 10–9.

In February 2008, it was announced that Orreal was to join the PDC full-time but failed to recapture his form from the Grand Slam, winning prize money in only one of his first ten events and failed to qualify for the UK Open. He then reached the semi-final of the Australian Open Players Championship, achieving wins against Mellisa Sinnott, Barry Jouannet, Denis Ovens and Warren French before losing to Paul Nicholson. He then suffered a first round exit from the Oceanic Masters, a tournament where the winner wins a place in the PDC World Darts Championship.

Orreal soon departed from the Pro Tour and returned to the AGP circuit.
