= 2007 World Darts Trophy =

World Darts Trophy

Tournament information
- Dates: 31 August 2007 – 9 September 2007
- Venue: De Vechtsebanen
- Location: Utrecht, Utrecht
- Country: the Netherlands
- Organisation(s): BDO, WDF
- Format: Sets; Final – Best of 13 Sets

Champion(s)
- (Scotland) Gary Anderson

The 2007 Bullit World Darts Trophy was the sixth and last edition of the World Darts Trophy, a professional darts tournament held at the De Vechtsebanen in Utrecht, the Netherlands, run by the British Darts Organisation and the World Darts Federation.

It had a playing format comparable with both World Championships (BDO and PDC) and features the majority of top ranked players from both organisations. The event featured the top 12 ranked players from the PDC and BDO, seven world champions (including both incumbents) and 23 world title winners – making it possibly the strongest field assembled since the split in 1992/93.

Raymond van Barneveld, the PDC World Champion, was beaten in the first round by fellow countryman Jelle Klaasen. The BDO World Champion Martin Adams fell at the quarter-final stage to Andy Hamilton. The final featured Gary Anderson against Phil Taylor. Taylor wasn't able to successfully defend his title despite hitting 17 maximum 180s in the final. Both players averaged over 100 in an excellent final – played over the same 13 set format as the BDO & PDC World Finals. Anderson captured his second major title – adding to his International Darts League success back in May.

== Prize fund ==
- 2007 prize money

Winner €45,000
Runner-up €22,500
Semi finalists €11,250
Quarter finalists €6,000
Last 16 €3,000
First round losers €2,000
Nine dart finish: Alfa Romeo Brera 2.4 JTDM 20V worth €50,000 (not won)
Highest check-out €1,000
Total €221,000

== Qualified players ==
The players in bold automatically qualify for the main stage and are seeded. The players in regular text automatically qualify for the main round but are not seed. The players in italics must go through the qualifiers:

=== BDO / WDF ===
**World Darts Trophy Merit Table**
1 to 8 on WDT Merit Table can be told based on seedings.

1. (Scotland) **Gary Anderson**
2. (Wales) **Mark Webster**
3. (England) **Martin Adams**
4. (England) **Darryl Fitton**
5. (Australia) **Simon Whitlock**
6. (England) **Scott Waites**
7. (England) **Tony O'Shea**
8. (Netherlands) **Remco van Eijden**

9 to 12 on WDT Merit Table can be told based on rest of the automatic qualifiers.
Exact order of which players are 9 to 12 is unknown.

- (Netherlands) Niels de Ruiter
- (Scotland) Mike Veitch
- (England) John Walton
- (Netherlands) Co Stompé

**Likely BDO / WDF qualifiers or wildcards**

- (New Zealand) Craig Pullen
- (Austria) Dietmar Burger
- (Netherlands) Edwin Max
- (England) Gary Robson
- (Finland) Jarkko Komula
- (Netherlands) Mario Robbe
- (Scotland) Mark Barilli
- (England) Martin Atkins
- (Germany) Michael Rosenauer
- (Scotland) Paul Hanvidge
- (England) Phill Nixon
- (New Zealand) Robert Grant
- (England) Shaun Greatbatch
- (Australia) Steve Duke
- (Australia) Shane Tichowitsch
- (England) Steve West

=== Professional Darts Corporation ===
**PDC Order of Merit**

1. (England) **Phil Taylor**
2. (Netherlands) **Raymond van Barneveld**
3. (England) **Colin Lloyd**
4. (England) **Peter Manley**
5. (England) **Terry Jenkins**
6. (England) **Dennis Priestley**
7. (England) **Adrian Lewis**
8. (Canada) **John Part**
9. (Netherlands) Roland Scholten
10. (England) Andy Hamilton
11. (England) James Wade
12. (England) Wayne Mardle
13. (Wales) Barrie Bates
14. (England) Ronnie Baxter
15. (England) Kevin Painter
16. (England) Andy Jenkins

**PDC qualifiers**

- (England) Mark Walsh
- (England) Denis Ovens
- (England) Andy Smith
- (Wales) Wayne Atwood
- (England) Bob Anderson
- (England) Peter Allen
- (England) Alan Caves
- (England) Gary Spedding

**Wildcards**

- (England) Mervyn King
- (Netherlands) Michael van Gerwen
- (Netherlands) Vincent van der Voort
- (Netherlands) Jelle Klaasen

== Qualifying ==
The top 12 players from the PDC Order of Merit and the top 12 BDO / WDF Players from the World Darts Trophy Merit Table automatically qualified for the event. Following controversy (see IDL 2007) regarding the number of players promised an invitation, a qualifying competition was held to fill the other eight places in the first round. Seven PDC players progressed to the first round including Dutchmen Michael van Gerwen, Jelle Klaasen and Vincent van der Voort. The other four PDC players were Denis Ovens, Kevin Painter, Mervyn King and Wayne Atwood. The only BDO player who made it through was Shaun Greatbatch.

First preliminary round (Best of 5 sets)

	Score	
(England) Andy Jenkins	3–0	(England) Phill Nixon
(Scotland) Paul Hanvidge	0–3	(Wales) Wayne Atwood
(Austria) Dietmar Burger	0–3	(England) Andy Smith
(Netherlands) Michael van Gerwen	3–0	(New Zealand) Robert Grant
(England) Ronnie Baxter	3–0	(Australia) Steve Duke
(Finland) Jarkko Komula	0–3	(England) Denis Ovens
(Germany) Michael Rosenauer	3–1	(England) Bob Anderson
(Netherlands) Jelle Klaasen	3–1	(Netherlands) Edwin Max
(England) Kevin Painter	3–1	(Australia) Shane Tichowitsch
(Netherlands) Mario Robbe	3–1	(England) Gary Spedding
(England) Steve West	3–0	(England) Peter Allen
(England) Mervyn King	3–1	(New Zealand) Craig Pullen
(England) Shaun Greatbatch	Bye	(Wales) Barrie Bates
(England) Martin Atkins	3–0	(England) Alan Caves
(England) Gary Robson	3–0	(England) Mark Walsh
(Netherlands) Vincent van der Voort	3–0	(Scotland) Mark Barilli

- (Wales) Barrie Bates withdrew due to broken foot.

Second preliminary round (Best of 5 sets)

	Score	
(England) Andy Jenkins	2–3	(Wales) Wayne Atwood
(England) Andy Smith	1–3	(Netherlands) Michael van Gerwen
(England) Ronnie Baxter	2–3	(England) Denis Ovens
(Germany) Michael Rosenauer	0–3	(Netherlands) Jelle Klaasen
(England) Kevin Painter	3–0	(Netherlands) Mario Robbe
(England) Steve West	1–3	(England) Mervyn King
(England) Shaun Greatbatch	3–2	(England) Martin Atkins
(England) Gary Robson	0–3	(Netherlands) Vincent van der Voort

== Tournament Proper ==
First round Best of 5 sets
1	(Scotland) Gary Anderson 98.16	3
(Wales) Wayne Atwood 82.77	0
16	(Canada) John Part 91.32	3
(Netherlands) Niels de Ruiter 81.21	1
9	(Australia) Simon Whitlock 93.03	3
(England) Wayne Mardle 88.56	2
8	(England) Peter Manley 85.23	3
(Netherlands) Michael van Gerwen 84.99	1
5	(England) Martin Adams 93.36	3
(England) Denis Ovens 82.02	1
12	(England) Dennis Priestley 93.45	3
(Scotland) Mike Veitch 87.36	1
13	(England) Tony O'Shea 91.77	0
(England) Andy Hamilton 90.81	3
4	(Netherlands) Raymond van Barneveld 101.49	1
(Netherlands) Jelle Klaasen 97.77	3
3	(Wales) Mark Webster 95.13	3
(England) Kevin Painter 90.99	2
14	(England) Adrian Lewis 92.43	3
(England) John Walton 87.30	0
11	(England) Scott Waites 91.50	3
(England) James Wade 89.88	2
6	(England) Colin Lloyd 88.14	1
(England) Mervyn King 92.85	3
7	(England) Darryl Fitton 90.28	0
(England) Shaun Greatbatch 90.23	3
10	(England) Terry Jenkins 93.17	3
(Netherlands) Co Stompé 93.80	2
15	(Netherlands) Remco van Eijden 81.16	1
(Netherlands) Roland Scholten 92.48	3
2	(England) Phil Taylor 98.08	3
(Netherlands) Vincent van der Voort 91.34	1

Second round Best of 5 sets
1	(Scotland) Gary Anderson 93.27	3
16	(Canada) John Part 90.54	1
9	(Australia) Simon Whitlock 95.19	2
8	(England) Peter Manley 95.25	3
5	(England) Martin Adams 92.01	3
12	(England) Dennis Priestley 91.77	1
(England) Andy Hamilton 86.34	3
(Netherlands) Jelle Klaasen 88.02	0
3	(Wales) Mark Webster 95.37	3
14	(England) Adrian Lewis 91.83	1
11	(England) Scott Waites 95.43	2
(England) Mervyn King 91.38	3
(England) Shaun Greatbatch 87.12	1
10	(England) Terry Jenkins 91.02	3
(Netherlands) Roland Scholten 91.35	1
2	(England) Phil Taylor 105.30	3

Quarter-finals; Best of 9 sets
1	(Scotland) Gary Anderson 95.37	5
8	(England) Peter Manley 90.15	1
5	(England) Martin Adams 94.47	4
(England) Andy Hamilton 94.74	5
3	(Wales) Mark Webster 92.43	3
(England) Mervyn King 94.17	5
10	(England) Terry Jenkins 96.78	3
2	(England) Phil Taylor 101.85	5

Semi-finals; Best of 11 sets
1	(Scotland) Gary Anderson 96.63	6
(England) Andy Hamilton 94.80	5
(England) Mervyn King 99.24	2
2	(England) Phil Taylor 102.72	6

Final; Best of 13 sets
1	(Scotland) Gary Anderson 103.32	7
2	(England) Phil Taylor 102.30	3

== Television coverage ==
The tournament was broadcast by SBS6 in the Netherlands, but was not shown in the UK. An internet feed from SBS was available - however this may be restricted to the Netherlands only due to contractual restrictions.
