= 2006 Premier League Darts =

Darts competition

2006 Holsten Premier League Darts

Tournament information
- Dates: 16 February–29 May 2006
- Nine-dart finish: Raymond van Barneveld

Champion(s)
- Phil Taylor

The 2006 Holsten Premier League was the second year of the Professional Darts Corporation's popular darts league. The 2006 league was launched with the top six players in the PDC world rankings and the addition of a wildcard player, Raymond van Barneveld who decided to switch from the British Darts Organisation just weeks after reaching their 2006 World Championship final.

Barneveld, a four-times BDO World Champion went on to achieve the perfect nine-dart finish on 23 March against Peter Manley, on the fifth night of the 2006 Premier League at the Bournemouth International Centre. It was the same night that he faced Phil Taylor for the first time since his switch, the match ended in a 7–7 draw.

Taylor and Barneveld dominated the league stages, with both players winning every match in the league phase against the other 5 players in the league. Taylor came out on top 8–6 in their other meeting in Doncaster.

Given the form of Taylor and Barneveld in the group matches, there was much anticipation of a clash between the two in the final. However, it failed to materialise as Roland Scholten averaged 104.13 in the semi-final to hammer Barneveld (average 91.79) by 11 legs to 3. Phil Taylor averaged 105.03 in his 11–3 semi-final win over Colin Lloyd (average 99.42).

Phil Taylor successfully defended his title by seeing off Scholten in the final by 16 legs to 6. Taylor's average in the final was 101.41 to Scholten's 92.01.

Barneveld and Taylor would ultimately have their next meeting in the final of the 2007 PDC World Darts Championship, with Barneveld ending Taylor's three-year reign as champion.

== Format ==
The format had a slight change from 2005. Previously, all twelve legs of a match had to be completed – regardless of whether a winner had already been determined. From 2006, a match would finish when a player reached the 8 legs victory target, unless the match reached 7–7 when the points would be shared and the match drawn.

== Venues ==
Like the inaugural Premier League Darts event, all 11 venues were used, but this time venues in Scotland (Aberdeen) and Wales (Newport) were also used.

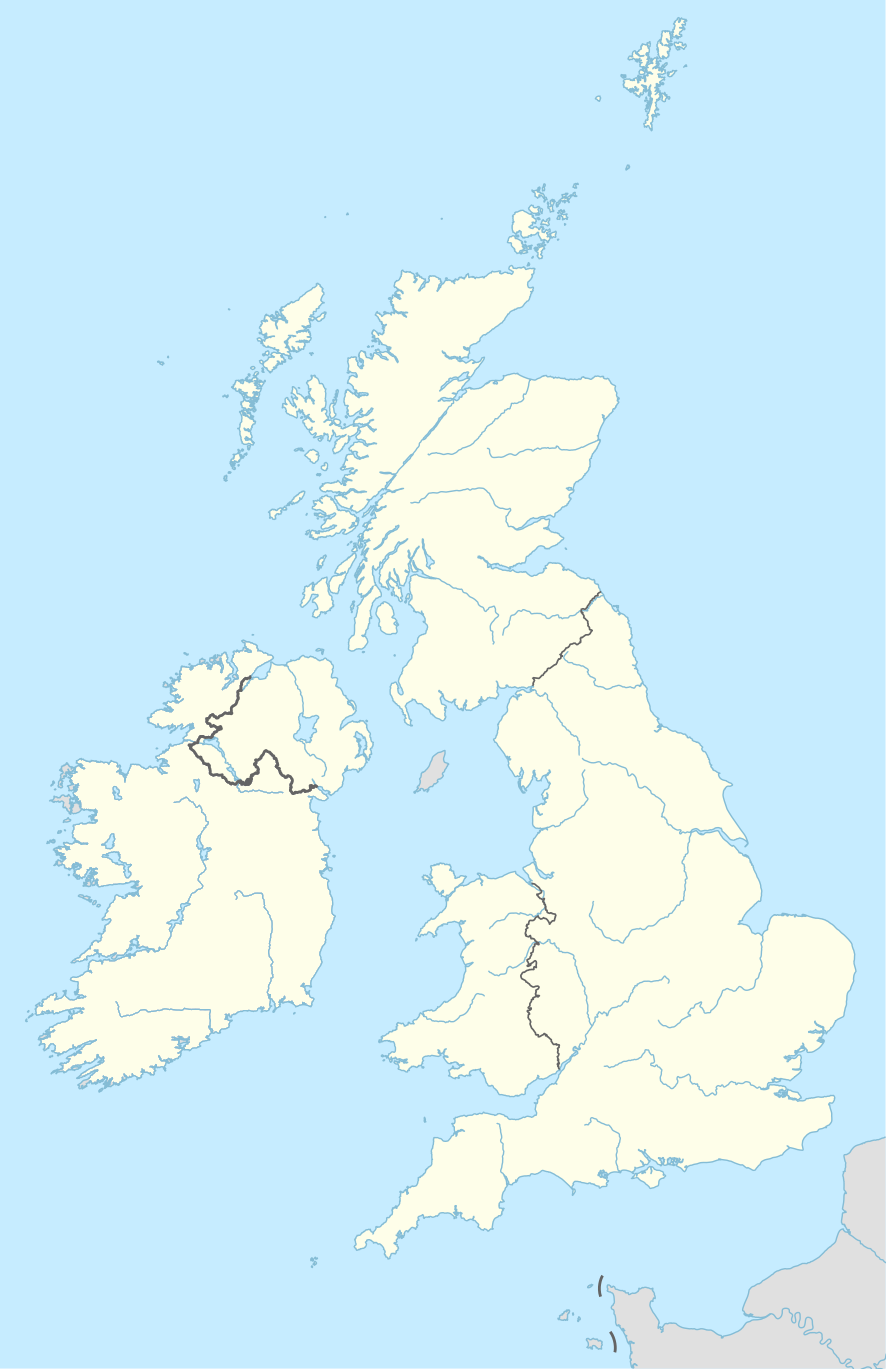
Locations of the 2006 Premier League venues in the United Kingdom.

== Results ==
=== 16 February – Week 1 ===
(England) King George's Hall, Blackburn

	Score	
Wayne Mardle (England); 95.01	6 – 8	(England) Phil Taylor; 99.45
Peter Manley (England); 86.38	4 – 8	(Netherlands) Roland Scholten; 90.15
Raymond van Barneveld (Netherlands); 98.66	8 – 1	(England) Ronnie Baxter; 92.03
Phil Taylor (England); 106.79	8 – 1	(England) Colin Lloyd; 95.59

=== 23 February – Week 2 ===
(England) Seaburn Leisure Centre, Sunderland

	Score	
Ronnie Baxter (England); 87.22	4 – 8	(Netherlands) Roland Scholten; 89.23
Wayne Mardle (England); 92.98	4 – 8	(Netherlands) Raymond van Barneveld; 100.55
Colin Lloyd (England); 92.16	8 – 6	(England) Peter Manley; 88.25
Roland Scholten (Netherlands); 94.66	4 – 8	(England) Phil Taylor; 97.71

=== 2 March – Week 3 ===
(Scotland) AECC, Aberdeen

	Score	
Colin Lloyd (England); 92.33	3 – 8	(England) Ronnie Baxter; 85.20
Peter Manley (England); 87.21	8 – 5	(England) Wayne Mardle; 85.88
Raymond van Barneveld (Netherlands); 91.48	8 – 3	(Netherlands) Roland Scholten; 80.28
Ronnie Baxter (England); 95.35	4 – 8	(England) Phil Taylor; 101.05

=== 16 March – Week 4 ===
(England) Wolverhampton Civic Hall, Wolverhampton

	Score	
Phil Taylor (England); 97.09	8 – 2	(England) Wayne Mardle; 85.20
Colin Lloyd (England); 86.02	6 – 8	(England) Peter Manley; 89.89
Ronnie Baxter (England); 98.95	8 – 3	(England) Peter Manley; 91.45
Roland Scholten (Netherlands); 93.28	8 – 3	(England) Wayne Mardle; 88.62

=== 23 March – Week 5 ===
(England) Bournemouth International Centre, Bournemouth

	Score	
Raymond van Barneveld (Netherlands); 100.69	8 – 3	(England) Peter Manley; 95.18
Roland Scholten (Netherlands); 90.17	7 – 7	(England) Ronnie Baxter; 88.98
Colin Lloyd (England); 87.82	7 – 7	(England) Wayne Mardle; 90.33
Phil Taylor (England); 100.88	7 – 7	(Netherlands) Raymond van Barneveld; 94.14

==== Nine-dart finish ====
The Premier League's first nine-dart finish occurred, when Raymond van Barneveld hit one during the ninth leg of his match against Peter Manley, checking out with T20, T19 and D12.

=== 30 March – Week 6 ===
(England) Sands Centre, Carlisle

	Score	
Phil Taylor (England); 107.75	8 – 1	(England) Peter Manley; 100.35
Ronnie Baxter (England); 97.02	4 – 8	(England) Colin Lloyd; 99.44
Wayne Mardle (England); 88.47	7 – 7	(Netherlands) Roland Scholten; 89.38
Peter Manley (England); 86.41	3 – 8	(Netherlands) Raymond van Barneveld; 96.83

=== 6 April – Week 7 ===
(Wales) Newport Centre, Newport

	Score	
Roland Scholten (Netherlands); 86.97	8 – 5	(England) Colin Lloyd; 91.67
Ronnie Baxter (England); 92.66	7 – 7	(England) Wayne Mardle; 86.87
Peter Manley (England); 84.56	3 – 8	(England) Phil Taylor; 102.19
Raymond van Barneveld (Netherlands); 101.72	8 – 4	(England) Colin Lloyd; 90.35

=== 20 April – Week 8 ===
(England) The Dome Leisure Centre, Doncaster

	Score	
Phil Taylor (England); 93.24	8 – 5	(England) Ronnie Baxter; 97.64
Colin Lloyd (England); 99.67	8 – 6	(Netherlands) Roland Scholten; 97.44
Wayne Mardle (England); 86.44	3 – 8	(England) Peter Manley; 91.00
Raymond van Barneveld (Netherlands); 101.04	6 – 8	(England) Phil Taylor; 104.75

=== 27 April – Week 9 ===
(England) Stevenage Arts & Leisure Centre, Stevenage

	Score	
Roland Scholten (Netherlands); 84.35	6 – 8	(England) Peter Manley; 86.36
Colin Lloyd (England); 87.59	3 – 8	(England) Phil Taylor; 99.35
Wayne Mardle (England); 94.60	8 – 5	(England) Ronnie Baxter; 89.41
Roland Scholten (Netherlands); 83.89	3 – 8	(Netherlands) Raymond van Barneveld; 92.98

=== 4 May – Week 10 ===
(England) Rivermead Centre, Reading

	Score	
Peter Manley (England); 86.71	3 – 8	(England) Ronnie Baxter; 86.39
Raymond van Barneveld (Netherlands); 103.44	8 – 5	(England) Wayne Mardle; 97.78
Raymond van Barneveld (Netherlands); 96.14	8 – 6	(England) Colin Lloyd; 92.11
Phil Taylor (England); 93.48	8 – 3	(Netherlands) Roland Scholten; 86.26
Ronnie Baxter (England); 101.33	2 – 8	(Netherlands) Raymond van Barneveld; 104.35
Wayne Mardle (England); 83.58	4 – 8	(England) Colin Lloyd; 91.07

=== Play-offs – 29 May ===
(England) Plymouth Pavilions, Plymouth

	Score	
Semi-finals (best of 21 legs)
Roland Scholten (Netherlands); 104.13	11 – 3	(Netherlands) Raymond van Barneveld; 91.79
Phil Taylor (England); 105.03	11 – 3	(England) Colin Lloyd; 99.42
Final (best of 31 legs)
Phil Taylor (England); 101.41	16 – 6	(Netherlands) Roland Scholten; 92.01

== Table and streaks ==
=== Table ===
Pos	Name	Pld	W	D	L	Pts	LF	LA	+/-	LWAT	100+	140+	180s	A	HC
1	(England) Phil Taylor W	12	11	1	0	23	95	45	+50	35	173	113	44	100.31	148
2	(Netherlands) Raymond van Barneveld	12	10	1	1	21	93	49	+44	37	190	114	45	98.50	164
3	(Netherlands) Roland Scholten RU	12	4	2	6	10	71	78	−7	25	178	98	40	88.84	137
4	(England) Colin Lloyd	12	4	1	7	9	67	83	−16	20	174	96	29	92.15	161
5	(England) Ronnie Baxter	12	3	2	7	8	63	79	−16	21	174	85	26	92.68	158
6	(England) Peter Manley	12	4	0	8	8	58	84	−26	19	214	112	13	89.48	160
7	(England) Wayne Mardle	12	1	3	8	5	61	90	−29	16	201	98	24	89.65	140

NB: LWAT = Legs Won Against Throw. Players separated by +/- leg difference if tied.

=== Streaks ===
Player	Week																					Play-offs	
Player	1		2		3		4		5		6		7		8		9		10			SF	F
(England) Phil Taylor	W	W	W		W		W		D		W		W		W	W	W		W			W	W
(Netherlands) Raymond van Barneveld	W		W		W		—N/a		W	D	W		W		L		W		W	W	W	L	—N/a
(Netherlands) Roland Scholten	W		W	L	L		W		D		D		W		L		L	L	L			W	L
(England) Colin Lloyd	L		W		L		L		D		W		L	L	W		L		L		W	L	—N/a
(England) Ronnie Baxter	L		L		W	L	W		D		L		D		L		L		W		L	—N/a	
(England) Peter Manley	L		L		W		W	L	L		L	L	L		W		W		L			—N/a	
(England) Wayne Mardle	L		L		L		L	L	D		D		D		L		W		L		L	—N/a	

NB: W = Won D = Drawn L = Lost N/A = Did not play

== Player statistics ==
The following statistics are for the league stage only. Playoffs are not included.

=== Phil Taylor ===
- Longest unbeaten run: 12
- Most consecutive wins: 6
- Most consecutive draws: 1
- Most consecutive losses: 0
- Longest without a win: 1
- Biggest victory: 8–1 (v. Colin Lloyd and v. Peter Manley)
- Biggest defeat: Player Undefeated

=== Raymond van Barneveld ===
- Longest unbeaten run: 7
- Most consecutive wins: 4
- Most consecutive draws: 1
- Most consecutive losses: 1
- Longest without a win: 1
- Biggest victory: 8–1 (v. Ronnie Baxter)
- Biggest defeat: 6–8 (v. Phil Taylor)

=== Roland Scholten ===
- Longest unbeaten run: 4
- Most consecutive wins: 2
- Most consecutive draws: 2
- Most consecutive losses: 4
- Longest without a win: 4
- Biggest victory: 8–3 (v. Wayne Mardle)
- Biggest defeat: 3–8 (v. Raymond van Barneveld (twice) and v. Phil Taylor)

=== Colin Lloyd ===
- Longest unbeaten run: 2
- Most consecutive wins: 1
- Most consecutive draws: 1
- Most consecutive losses: 2
- Longest without a win: 3
- Biggest victory: 8–4 (v. Ronnie Baxter and v. Wayne Mardle)
- Biggest defeat: 1–8 (v. Phil Taylor)

=== Ronnie Baxter ===
- Longest unbeaten run: 2
- Most consecutive wins: 1
- Most consecutive draws: 1
- Most consecutive losses: 2
- Longest without a win: 5
- Biggest victory: 8–3 (v. Colin Lloyd and v. Peter Manley)
- Biggest defeat: 1–8 (v. Raymond van Barneveld)

=== Peter Manley ===
- Longest unbeaten run: 2
- Most consecutive wins: 2
- Most consecutive draws: 0
- Most consecutive losses: 5
- Longest without a win: 5
- Biggest victory: 8–3 (v. Wayne Mardle)
- Biggest defeat: 1–8 (v. Phil Taylor)

=== Wayne Mardle ===
- Longest unbeaten run: 3
- Most consecutive wins: 1
- Most consecutive draws: 3
- Most consecutive losses: 5
- Longest without a win: 9
- Biggest victory: 8–5 (v. Ronnie Baxter)
- Biggest defeat: 2–8 (v. Phil Taylor)

== Top match Averages ==
Darts averages are based on the total number of points scored divided number of darts thrown (multiplied by 3 in this case to give a "3 dart average"). There were 16 matches where a player managed an average in excess of 100 per visit to the board. Phil Taylor achieved this during seven matches, Raymond van Barneveld six times. Roland Scholten, Ronnie Baxter and Peter Manley each averaged over 100 during one match in the competition.

- 107.75 – Phil Taylor v Peter Manley (week 6)
- 106.79 – Phil Taylor v Colin Lloyd (week 1)
- 105.03 – Phil Taylor v Roland Scholten (final)
- 104.75 – Phil Taylor v Raymond van Barneveld (week 8)
- 104.35 – Raymond van Barneveld v Ronnie Baxter (week 10)
- 104.13 – Roland Scholten v Raymond van Barneveld (semi-final)
- 103.44 – Raymond van Barneveld v Wayne Mardle (week 10)
- 102.19 – Phil Taylor v Peter Manley (week 7)
- 101.33 – Ronnie Baxter v Raymond van Barneveld (week 10, Baxter lost match 2–8)
- 101.72 – Raymond van Barneveld v Colin Lloyd (week 7)
- 101.05 – Phil Taylor v Ronnie Baxter (week 3)
- 101.04 – Raymond van Barneveld v Phil Taylor (week 8, Barneveld lost match 6–8)
- 100.88 – Phil Taylor v Raymond van Barneveld (week 5)
- 100.69 – Raymond van Barneveld v Peter Manley (week 5)
- 100.55 – Raymond van Barneveld v Wayne Mardle (week 2)
- 100.35 – Peter Manley v Phil Taylor (week 6, Manley lost match 1–8)
