= 2009 Players Championship Finals =

2009 coral.co.uk Players Championship Finals

Tournament information
- Dates: 30 January–1 February 2009
- Venue: Circus Tavern
- Location: Purfleet, England
- Organisation(s): Professional Darts Corporation (PDC)
- Format: Legs; Final – best of 31
- Prize fund: £200,000
- Winner's share: £50,000
- High checkout: 167; James Wade; Ronnie Baxter

Champion(s)
- Phil Taylor (ENG)

The 2009 coral.co.uk Players Championship Finals was the inaugural edition of the PDC tournament, the Players Championship Finals, which saw the top 32 players from the 2008 PDC Players Championship Order of Merit taking part. The tournament took place between 30 January to 1 February 2009 and was held at the Circus Tavern, Purfleet, England – the former venue of the PDC World Darts Championship.

== Prize money ==
The 2009 Players Championship Finals featured a prize fund of £200,000.

Position (no. of players)		Prize money (Total: £200,000)
Winner	(1)	£50,000
Runner-Up	(1)	£25,000
Semi-finalists	(2)	£12,500
Quarter-finalists	(4)	£8,500
Last 16 (second round)	(8)	£4,000
Last 32 (first round)	(16)	£4,000
Highest Checkout	(2)	£2,000

== Qualification ==
The top 32 players from the PDC Players Championship Order of Merit after the last Players Championship of 2008 qualified for the event.

1. (England) Phil Taylor (champion)
2. (England) James Wade (semi-finals)
3. (England) Alan Tabern (second round)
4. (England) Mervyn King (quarter-finals)
5. (England) Ronnie Baxter (semi-finals)
6. (England) Dennis Priestley (quarter-finals)
7. (England) Colin Osborne (first round)
8. (England) Colin Lloyd (quarter-finals)
9. (England) Andy Hamilton (second round)
10. (Netherlands) Raymond van Barneveld (quarter-finals)
11. (England) Denis Ovens (first round)
12. (England) Terry Jenkins (first round)
13. (England) Mark Walsh (first round)
14. (Scotland) Robert Thornton (runner-up)
15. (England) Kevin Painter (second round)
16. (Netherlands) Vincent van der Voort (second round)
17. (England) Chris Mason (first round)
18. (England) Alex Roy (first round)
19. (England) Mark Dudbridge (first round)
20. (England) Wayne Mardle (second round)
21. (England) Wayne Jones (second round)
22. (Canada) John Part (second round)
23. (England) Andy Jenkins (first round)
24. (England) Peter Manley (first round)
25. (England) Jamie Caven (first round)
26. (England) Andy Smith (second round)
27. (England) Steve Maish (first round)
28. (England) Tony Eccles (first round)
29. (Northern Ireland) Felix McBrearty (first round)
30. (England) Adrian Lewis (first round)
31. (England) Steve Beaton (first round)
32. (Netherlands) Michael van Gerwen (first round)

== Draw ==
First round (best of 11 legs); 30 January
1	(England) Phil Taylor 108.49	6
32	(Netherlands) Michael van Gerwen 92.10	3
16	(Netherlands) Vincent van der Voort 80.29	6
17	(England) Chris Mason 76.51	2
8	(England) Colin Lloyd 95.21	6
25	(England) Jamie Caven 81.23	1
9	(England) Andy Hamilton 90.00	6
24	(England) Peter Manley 88.25	2
5	(England) Ronnie Baxter 90.82	6
28	(England) Tony Eccles 93.16	4
12	(England) Terry Jenkins 101.84	2
21	(England) Wayne Jones 99.08	6
4	(England) Mervyn King 93.79	6
29	(Northern Ireland) Felix McBrearty 81.69	2
13	(England) Mark Walsh 94.06	4
20	(England) Wayne Mardle 97.36	6
2	(England) James Wade 97.05	6
31	(England) Steve Beaton 83.34	2
15	(England) Kevin Painter 91.98	6
18	(England) Alex Roy 87.51	5
7	(England) Colin Osborne 79.74	1
26	(England) Andy Smith 99.03	6
10	(Netherlands) Raymond van Barneveld 99.77	6
23	(England) Andy Jenkins 90.75	4
6	(England) Dennis Priestley 87.46	6
27	(England) Steve Maish 81.98	3
11	(England) Denis Ovens 84.80	3
22	(Canada) John Part 90.19	6
3	(England) Alan Tabern 97.02	6
30	(England) Adrian Lewis 86.13	3
14	(Scotland) Robert Thornton 84.61	6
19	(England) Mark Dudbridge 83.97	5

Second round (best of 11 legs); 31 January
1	(England) Phil Taylor 108.63	6
16	(Netherlands) Vincent van der Voort 98.11	3
8	(England) Colin Lloyd 100.51	6
9	(England) Andy Hamilton 91.65	2
5	(England) Ronnie Baxter 92.30	6
21	(England) Wayne Jones 93.75	4
4	(England) Mervyn King 96.25	6
20	(England) Wayne Mardle 95.92	4
2	(England) James Wade 93.43	6
15	(England) Kevin Painter 86.00	5
26	(England) Andy Smith 89.07	0
10	(Netherlands) Raymond van Barneveld 99.10	6
6	(England) Dennis Priestley 91.42	6
22	(Canada) John Part 93.02	5
3	(England) Alan Tabern 97.30	2
14	(Scotland) Robert Thornton 96.05	6

Quarter-finals (best of 17 legs); 31 January
1	(England) Phil Taylor 92.65	9
8	(England) Colin Lloyd 83.83	0
5	(England) Ronnie Baxter 94.87	9
4	(England) Mervyn King 95.59	5
2	(England) James Wade 97.58	9
10	(Netherlands) Raymond van Barneveld 100.07	8
6	(England) Dennis Priestley 90.69	5
14	(Scotland) Robert Thornton 94.33	9

Semi-finals (best of 25 legs); 1 February
1	(England) Phil Taylor 101.58	13
5	(England) Ronnie Baxter 92.68	2
2	(England) James Wade 93.86	10
14	(Scotland) Robert Thornton 95.40	13

Final (best of 31 legs); 1 February
1	(England) Phil Taylor 98.04	16
14	(Scotland) Robert Thornton 88.52	9

Scores after player's names are three-dart averages (total points scored divided by darts thrown and multiplied by 3)

== Statistics ==
Player	Played	Legs Won	Legs Lost	100+	140+	180s	High Checkout	3-dart Average
(England) Terry Jenkins	1	2	6	16	7	1	40	101.84
(England) Phil Taylor	5	50	17	84	65	11	161	100.65
(Netherlands) Raymond van Barneveld	3	20	13	41	43	4	96	99.79
(England) Alan Tabern	2	8	9	26	15	4	121	97.15
(England) Wayne Mardle	2	10	10	31	12	6	119	96.65
(England) Wayne Jones	2	10	8	28	12	5	127	96.09
(England) Mervyn King	3	17	15	37	32	7	118	95.31
(England) James Wade	4	31	28	76	49	16	167	95.24
(England) Andy Smith	2	6	7	16	15	3	161	94.54
(England) Mark Walsh	1	4	6	17	3	2	66	94.06
(England) Tony Eccles	1	4	6	11	9	2	56	93.16
(England) Ronnie Baxter	4	23	26	54	31	6	167	92.82
(England) Colin Lloyd	3	12	12	25	19	5	72	92.49
(Netherlands) Michael van Gerwen	1	3	6	13	5	1	60	92.10
(Canada) John Part	2	11	9	26	9	5	101	91.73
(Scotland) Robert Thornton	5	43	38	99	58	20	150	91.62
(England) Andy Hamilton	2	8	8	23	11	1	44	90.78
(England) Andy Jenkins	1	4	6	15	5	0	84	90.75
(England) Dennis Priestley	3	17	17	48	24	6	156	90.03
(England) Kevin Painter	2	11	11	28	17	3	105	89.02
(England) Peter Manley	1	2	6	13	7	0	101	88.25
(Netherlands) Vincent van der Voort	2	9	8	17	13	4	161	88.22
(England) Alex Roy	1	5	6	15	6	2	114	87.51
(England) Adrian Lewis	1	3	6	6	7	1	121	86.13
(England) Denis Ovens	1	3	6	13	4	3	78	84.80
(England) Mark Dudbridge	1	5	6	12	9	3	52	83.97
(England) Steve Beaton	1	2	6	8	2	2	106	83.34
(England) Steve Maish	1	3	6	13	6	0	76	81.98
(Northern Ireland) Felix McBrearty	1	2	6	8	4	0	40	81.69
(England) Jamie Caven	1	1	6	8	2	0	78	81.23
(England) Colin Osborne	1	1	6	6	3	1	92	79.74
(England) Chris Mason	1	2	6	5	4	2	56	76.51

== Television Coverage ==
ITV4 screened live coverage of the tournament, becoming ITV's third televised tournament after the Grand Slam of Darts and the European Championship. Also, there was nightly highlights shown on ITV1. Again, Matt Smith presented the coverage, with analysis from Chris Mason (once he had lost to van der Voort) and Alan Warriner-Little, commentary from Mason, Stuart Pyke, John Rawling and Warriner-Little, and reports from Ned Boulting.
