= 2017 German Darts Masters =

The name 2017 German Darts Masters was used for two darts tournaments organised by the Professional Darts Corporation in 2017:

- The 2017 German Darts Masters (European Tour), an event held in Jena in April 2017 as part of the 2017 European Tour
- The 2017 German Darts Masters (World Series of Darts), an event held in Düsseldorf in October 2017 as part of the 2017 World Series of Darts
