= 2009 Premier League Darts =

Darts competition

2009 Whyte & Mackay Premier League Darts

Tournament information
- Dates: 5 February–25 May 2009

Champion(s)
- James Wade

The 2009 Whyte & Mackay Premier League was a darts tournament organised by the Professional Darts Corporation.

The tournament kicked off at the Echo Arena Liverpool, which hosted the biggest ever crowd for a PDC event of almost 8,000 in 2008.

New venues in Edinburgh and Exeter joined some of the UK's biggest arenas, including Belfast's Odyssey Arena, Manchester's MEN Arena, Birmingham's National Indoor Arena, the Sheffield Arena and Newcastle's Metro Radio Arena.

The tournament came to a conclusion with the play-offs on Monday 25 May at the Wembley Arena – coinciding with the Football League play-offs at the neighbouring Wembley Stadium over the same weekend. Phil Taylor was defending his Whyte & Mackay Premier League title once again, however he failed to retain it after losing to Mervyn King 10–6 in the semi-finals. James Wade beat King 13–8 in the final, to claim the £125,000 first prize and the first Premier League not to be claimed by Taylor.

== Qualification ==
The top six players from the PDC Order of Merit following the 2009 PDC World Darts Championship were confirmed on 5 January. Jelle Klaasen and Wayne Mardle were named as the two Sky Sports wild card selections on 9 January.

Qualifiers are as follows:

1. (England) Phil Taylor
2. (England) James Wade
3. (Netherlands) Raymond van Barneveld
4. (Canada) John Part
5. (England) Terry Jenkins
6. (England) Mervyn King
7. (England) Wayne Mardle
8. (Netherlands) Jelle Klaasen

== Venues ==
Fifteen venues were used in the 2009 Premier League, with the only changes from 2008 being Edinburgh and Exeter replacing Plymouth and Bournemouth.

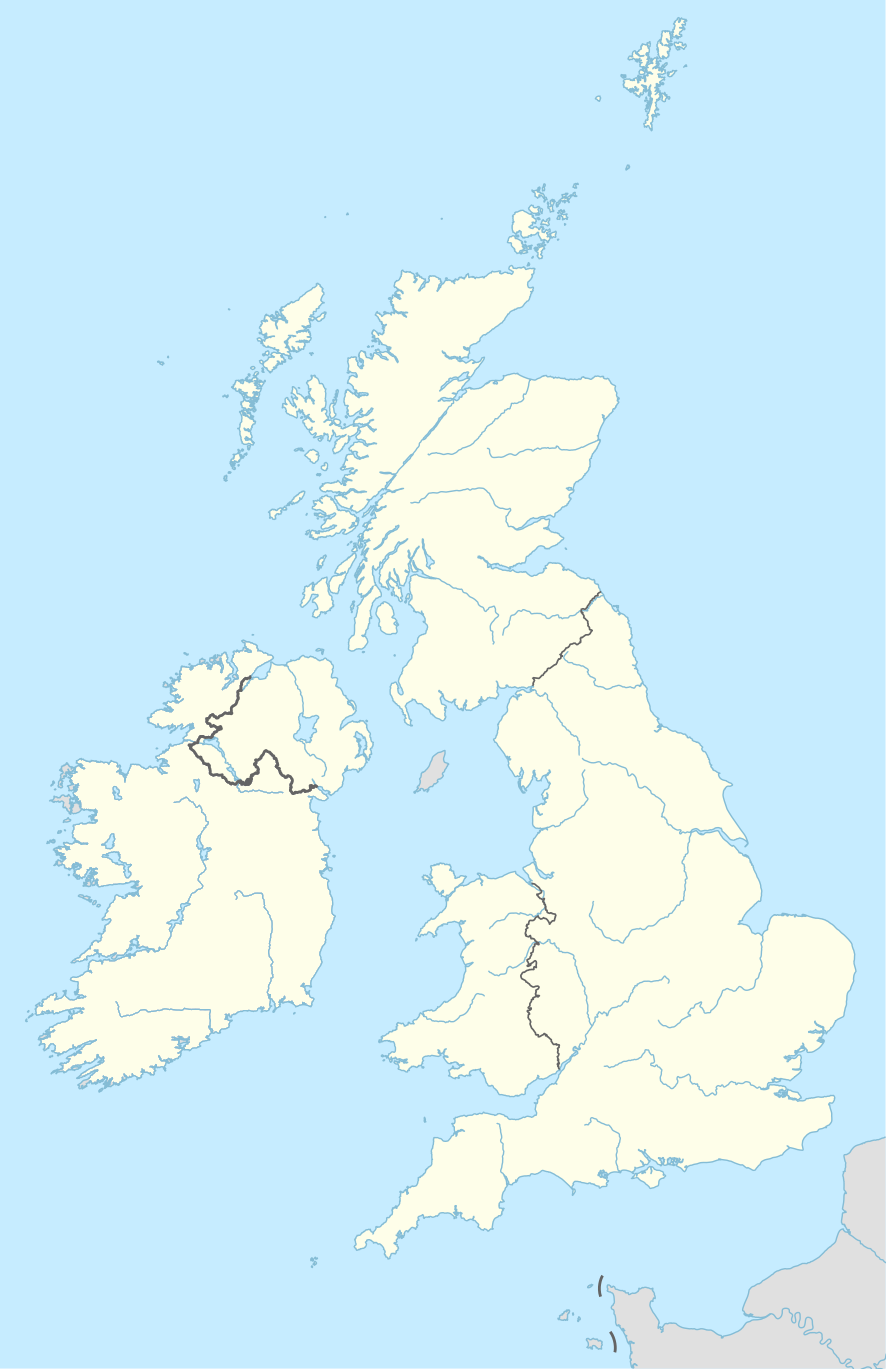
Locations of the 2009 Premier League venues in the United Kingdom.

(England) Liverpool	(Scotland) Edinburgh	(England) Coventry	(Northern Ireland) Belfast	(England) Newcastle
Echo Arena Liverpool; 5 February	Royal Highland Showground; 12 February	Ricoh Arena; 19 February	Odyssey Arena; 26 February	Metro Radio Arena; 5 March
(England) Manchester	(England) Brighton	(England) Birmingham	(Scotland) Glasgow	(England) Exeter
MEN Arena; 12 March	Brighton Centre; 19 March	National Indoor Arena; 26 March	SECC; 2 April	Westpoint Arena; 9 April
(England) Nottingham	(Scotland) Aberdeen	(England) Sheffield	(Wales) Cardiff	(England) London
Trent FM Arena; 16 April	AECC; 23 April	Sheffield Arena; 30 April	Cardiff International Arena; 7 May	Wembley Arena; 25 May

== Prize money ==
The prize fund increased again with the top prize now reaching £125,000, and the total prize fund rising to £400,000.

Stage	Prize money
Winner	£125,000
Runner-up	£65,000
Semi-finalists (x2)	£40,000
5th place	£32,500
6th place	£30,000
7th place	£27,500
8th place	£25,000
High Checkout (per night)	£1,000
Total	£400,000

== Results ==
- Players in italics are challengers, and games involving them are best of 12 legs, not best of 14 as the regular matches, and they also don't count towards the standings.

=== League stage ===
==== 5 February – Week 1 ====
(England) Echo Arena, Liverpool

Player	Legs	Player
James Wade (England); 93.12	7 – 7	(Canada) John Part; 88.23
Jelle Klaasen (Netherlands); 97.50	7 – 7	(England) Terry Jenkins; 96.95
~~Mervyn King~~ (England); ~~97.63~~	~~8 – 1~~	(England) ~~Wayne Mardle~~; ~~85.76~~
Raymond van Barneveld (Netherlands); 96.55	4 – 8	(England) Phil Taylor; 107.50
High Checkout: Raymond van Barneveld 161

==== 12 February – Week 2 ====
(Scotland) Royal Highland Centre, Edinburgh

Player	Legs	Player
John Part (Canada); 92.43	7 – 7	(Netherlands) Raymond van Barneveld; 99.87
~~Wayne Mardle~~ (England); ~~88.62~~	~~7 – 7~~	(England) ~~Terry Jenkins~~; ~~95.82~~
Phil Taylor (England); 101.94	8 – 2	(Netherlands) Jelle Klaasen; 82.41
James Wade (England); 90.56	1 – 8	(England) Mervyn King; 104.00
High Checkout: ~~Wayne Mardle 160~~

==== 19 February – Week 3 ====
(England) Ricoh Arena, Coventry

Player	Legs	Player
Terry Jenkins (England); 99.36	7 – 7	(England) Phil Taylor; 101.86
Raymond van Barneveld (Netherlands); 103.19	4 – 8	(England) James Wade; 107.77
Mervyn King (England); 103.09	8 – 2	(Canada) John Part; 94.98
~~Jelle Klaasen~~ (Netherlands); ~~88.49~~	~~6 – 8~~	(England) ~~Wayne Mardle~~; ~~88.29~~
High Checkout: ~~Wayne Mardle 156~~

==== 26 February – Week 4 ====
(Northern Ireland) Odyssey Arena, Belfast

Player	Legs	Player
~~John Part~~ (Canada); ~~87.90~~	~~8 – 1~~	(England) ~~Wayne Mardle~~; ~~88.68~~
Mervyn King (England); 97.61	8 – 4	(Netherlands) Jelle Klaasen; 88.38
James Wade (England); 105.35	8 – 4	(England) Phil Taylor; 104.69
Terry Jenkins (England); 101.71	6 – 8	(Netherlands) Raymond van Barneveld; 106.51
High Checkout: Jelle Klaasen 158

==== 5 March – Week 5 ====
(England) Metro Radio Arena, Newcastle upon Tyne

Player	Legs	Player
Jelle Klaasen (Netherlands); 94.51	6 – 8	(England) James Wade; 91.46
Phil Taylor (England); 106.36	7 – 7	(England) Mervyn King; 102.97
~~Wayne Mardle~~ (England); ~~90.76~~	~~7 – 7~~	(Netherlands) ~~Raymond van Barneveld~~; ~~95.70~~
John Part (Canada); 92.14	8 – 5	(England) Terry Jenkins; 92.62
High Checkout: James Wade 170

==== 12 March – Week 6 ====
(England) MEN Arena, Manchester

Player	Legs	Player
Raymond van Barneveld (Netherlands); 105.82	8 – 3	(England) Mervyn King; 100.80
Jelle Klaasen (Netherlands); 90.57	7 – 7	(Canada) John Part; 88.63
Terry Jenkins (England); 94.97	5 – 8	(England) James Wade; 92.50
~~Phil Taylor~~ (England); ~~99.17~~	~~8 – 4~~	(England) ~~Wayne Mardle~~; ~~90.44~~
High Checkout: Jelle Klaasen 170

==== 19 March – Week 7 ====
(England) Brighton Centre, Brighton

Player	Legs	Player
Mervyn King (England); 89.27	5 – 8	(England) Terry Jenkins; 94.92
~~Wayne Mardle~~ (England); ~~91.31~~	~~3 – 8~~	(England) ~~James Wade~~; ~~98.74~~
Raymond van Barneveld (Netherlands); 91.51	8 – 3	(Netherlands) Jelle Klaasen; 85.99
Phil Taylor (England); 104.05	8 – 3	(Canada) John Part; 95.14
High Checkout: Phil Taylor 170

==== 26 March – Week 8 ====
(England) National Indoor Arena, Birmingham

Player	Legs	Player
~~Wayne Mardle~~ (England); ~~85.06~~	~~2 – 8~~	(England) ~~Mervyn King~~; ~~96.24~~
Terry Jenkins (England); 89.88	6 – 8	(Netherlands) Jelle Klaasen; 95.40
John Part (Canada); 99.28	7 – 7	(England) James Wade; 99.22
Phil Taylor (England); 101.32	8 – 2	(Netherlands) Raymond van Barneveld; 96.76
High Checkout: Mervyn King 126

==== 2 April – Week 9 ====
(Scotland) SECC, Glasgow

Player	Legs	Player
Raymond van Barneveld (Netherlands); 103.32	8 – 1	(Canada) John Part; 94.75
~~Terry Jenkins~~ (England); ~~92.74~~	~~8 – 2~~	(England) ~~Wayne Mardle~~; ~~87.00~~
Jelle Klaasen (Netherlands); 93.43	6 – 8	(England) Phil Taylor; 101.31
Mervyn King (England); 86.50	8 – 3	(England) James Wade; 84.55
High Checkout: Mervyn King 119

==== 9 April – Week 10 ====
(England) Westpoint Arena, Exeter

Player	Legs	Player
John Part (Canada); 88.95	8 – 6	(England) Mervyn King; 87.43
Phil Taylor (England); 97.51	7 – 7	(England) Terry Jenkins; 94.89
James Wade (England); 100.45	8 – 5	(Netherlands) Raymond van Barneveld; 98.58
John Part (Canada) †; 90.67	7 – 7	(Netherlands) Jelle Klaasen; 89.47
High Checkout: John Part 150

==== 16 April – Week 11 ====
(England) Trent FM Arena, Nottingham

Player	Legs	Player
Jelle Klaasen (Netherlands); 97.23	7 – 7	(England) Mervyn King †; 95.80
James Wade (England); 108.17	8 – 1	(England) Terry Jenkins; 95.71
Mervyn King (England); 97.62	7 – 7	(Netherlands) Raymond van Barneveld; 96.84
Phil Taylor (England); 103.85	7 – 7	(England) James Wade †; 94.18
High Checkout: James Wade 145

==== 23 April – Week 12 ====
(Scotland) AECC, Aberdeen

Player	Legs	Player
James Wade (England); 105.26	7 – 2	(Scotland) Robert Thornton; 86.59
Terry Jenkins (England); 97.18	7 – 7	(England) Mervyn King; 99.42
Jelle Klaasen (Netherlands); 89.70	5 – 8	(Netherlands) Raymond van Barneveld; 96.88
John Part (Canada); 100.05	3 – 8	(England) Phil Taylor; 116.01*
High Checkout: Phil Taylor 161

==== 30 April – Week 13 ====
(England) Sheffield Arena, Sheffield

Player	Legs	Player
Raymond van Barneveld (Netherlands); 101.86	7 – 5	(England) Adrian Lewis; 98.70
Phil Taylor (England); 98.94	7 – 4	(England) Dennis Priestley; 97.31
Terry Jenkins (England); 98.87	8 – 3	(Canada) John Part; 83.33
James Wade (England); 102.00	8 – 4	(Netherlands) Jelle Klaasen; 90.23
High Checkout: James Wade 170

==== 7 May – Week 14 ====
(Wales) Cardiff International Arena, Cardiff

Player	Legs	Player
Jelle Klaasen (Netherlands); 94.90	7 – 3	(Wales) Mark Webster; 84.72
John Part (Canada); 93.54	4 – 7	(Scotland) Gary Anderson; 107.40
Raymond van Barneveld (Netherlands); 93.76	7 – 7	(England) Terry Jenkins; 93.61
Mervyn King (England); 95.49	2 – 8	(England) Phil Taylor; 106.74
High Checkout: Gary Anderson 121

==== Notes ====
† – Wayne Mardle didn't play in week ten because of a virus. John Part played two matches in week ten, with Mardle due to play two matches in week eleven, giving Part the night off that week. However, Mardle was rushed into hospital with mumps on 15 April, which ruled him out of week eleven. This meant that Mervyn King and James Wade each played twice during week eleven, with Mardle now due to play five matches in the last three weeks. Mardle had been due to play two matches in both weeks thirteen and fourteen, which would give King the night off in Sheffield, and Wade the night off in Cardiff. However, Mardle was re-admitted to hospital, ruling him out of week twelve, and in accordance with tournament regulations after missing three consecutive Premier League match nights, was removed from the tournament. Mardle's match results from the tournament were also annulled, hurting some of the remaining players more than others. Following Mardle's removal from the tournament, in order for each remaining night to have four matches, there was a series of challenge matches featuring Robert Thornton, Adrian Lewis, Dennis Priestley, Mark Webster and Gary Anderson.

* – Phil Taylor's average of 116.01 was, at the time, the highest recorded three-dart average in televised darts history. He broke his own record of 114.53, set against Wes Newton during the 2008 UK Open.

=== Play-offs – 25 May ===
(England) Wembley Arena, London

	Score	
Semi-finals (best of 19 legs)
Phil Taylor (England); 95.78	6 – 10	(England) Mervyn King; 89.86
James Wade (England); 97.93	10 – 8	(Netherlands) Raymond van Barneveld; 95.26
Final (best of 25 legs)
Mervyn King (England); 85.83	8 – 13	(England) James Wade; 90.38
High Checkout: Mervyn King 156 (Final)

== Table and Streaks ==
=== Table ===
Pos	Name	Pld	W	D	L	Pts	LF	LA	+/-	LWAT	100+	140+	180s	A	HC
1	(England) Phil Taylor	12	7	4	1	18	88	58	+30	29	194	128	56	104.43	170
2	(England) James Wade W	12	7	3	2	17	81	66	+15	28	181	114	43	97.44	170
3	(Netherlands) Raymond van Barneveld	12	5	3	4	13	76	71	+5	25	188	122	43	99.13	167
4	(England) Mervyn King RU	12	4	4	4	12	76	70	+6	28	203	114	37	96.67	130
5	(England) Terry Jenkins	12	2	5	5	9	74	83	−9	26	207	129	46	95.89	141
6	(Canada) John Part	12	2	5	5	9	63	86	−23	18	180	72	25	92.38	150
7	(Netherlands) Jelle Klaasen	12	1	4	7	6	66	90	−24	26	173	93	33	91.24	170

Top four qualify for Play-offs after Week 14.
NB: LWAT = Legs Won Against Throw. Players separated by +/- leg difference if tied.

=== Streaks ===
Player		Week																Play-offs	
Player		1	2	3	4	5	6	7	8	9	10		11		12	13	14	SF	F
(England) Phil Taylor		W	W	D	L	D	~~W~~	W	W	W	D		D		W	~~W~~	W	L	—N/a
(England) James Wade		D	L	W	W	W	W	~~W~~	D	L	W		W	D	~~W~~	W	—N/a	W	W
(Netherlands) Raymond van Barneveld		L	D	L	W	D	W	W	L	W	L		D		W	~~W~~	D	L	—N/a
(England) Mervyn King		~~W~~	W	W	W	D	L	L	~~W~~	W	L		D	D	D	—N/a	L	W	L
(England) Terry Jenkins		D	D	D	L	L	L	W	L	~~W~~	D		L		D	W	D	—N/a	
(Canada) John Part		D	D	L	~~W~~	W	D	L	D	L	W	D	—N/a		L	L	L	—N/a	
(Netherlands) Jelle Klaasen		D	L	L	L	L	D	L	W	L	D		D		L	L	~~W~~	—N/a	
(England) Wayne Mardle		L	D	~~W~~	L	D	L	L	L	L	—N/a		—N/a		Withdrawn			—N/a	
Challengers	(Scotland) Robert Thornton	—N/a													L	—N/a		—N/a	
Challengers	(England) Adrian Lewis	—N/a														L	—N/a	—N/a	
Challengers	(England) Dennis Priestley	—N/a														L	—N/a	—N/a	
Challengers	(Wales) Mark Webster	—N/a															L	—N/a	
Challengers	(Scotland) Gary Anderson	—N/a															~~W~~	—N/a	

NB: W = Won; D = Drawn; L = Lost; N/A = Did Not Play; – indicates match did not count towards final standings

== Player statistics ==
The following statistics are only for league stage games that contributed to the final standings. Annulled fixtures, challenge matches and play-offs are not included.

=== Phil Taylor ===
- Longest unbeaten run: 6
- Most consecutive wins: 3
- Most consecutive draws: 2
- Most consecutive losses: 1
- Longest without a win: 3
- Biggest victory: 8–2 (v. Jelle Klaasen, v. Raymond van Barneveld and v. Mervyn King)
- Biggest defeat: 4–8 (v. James Wade)

=== James Wade ===
- Longest unbeaten run: 5
- Most consecutive wins: 4
- Most consecutive draws: 1
- Most consecutive losses: 1
- Longest without a win: 2
- Biggest victory: 8–1 (v. Terry Jenkins)
- Biggest defeat: 1–8 (v. Mervyn King)

=== Raymond van Barneveld ===
- Longest unbeaten run: 3
- Most consecutive wins: 3
- Most consecutive draws: 1
- Most consecutive losses: 1
- Longest without a win: 3
- Biggest victory: 8–1 (v. John Part)
- Biggest defeat: 2–8 (v. Phil Taylor)

=== Mervyn King ===
- Longest unbeaten run: 4
- Most consecutive wins: 3
- Most consecutive draws: 3
- Most consecutive losses: 2
- Longest without a win: 5
- Biggest victory: 8–1 (v. James Wade)
- Biggest defeat: 2–8 (v. Phil Taylor)

=== Terry Jenkins ===
- Longest unbeaten run: 3
- Most consecutive wins: 1
- Most consecutive draws: 2
- Most consecutive losses: 3
- Longest without a win: 5
- Biggest victory: 8–3 (v. John Part)
- Biggest defeat: 1–8 (v. James Wade)

=== John Part ===
- Longest unbeaten run: 2
- Most consecutive wins: 1
- Most consecutive draws: 2
- Most consecutive losses: 2
- Longest without a win: 4
- Biggest victory: 8–5 (v. Terry Jenkins)
- Biggest defeat: 1–8 (v. Raymond van Barneveld)

=== Jelle Klaasen ===
- Longest unbeaten run: 2
- Most consecutive wins: 1
- Most consecutive draws: 2
- Most consecutive losses: 3
- Longest without a win: 6
- Biggest victory: 8–6 (v. Terry Jenkins)
- Biggest defeat: 2–8 (v. Phil Taylor)
