= Wayne Mardle =

English darts player (born 1973)

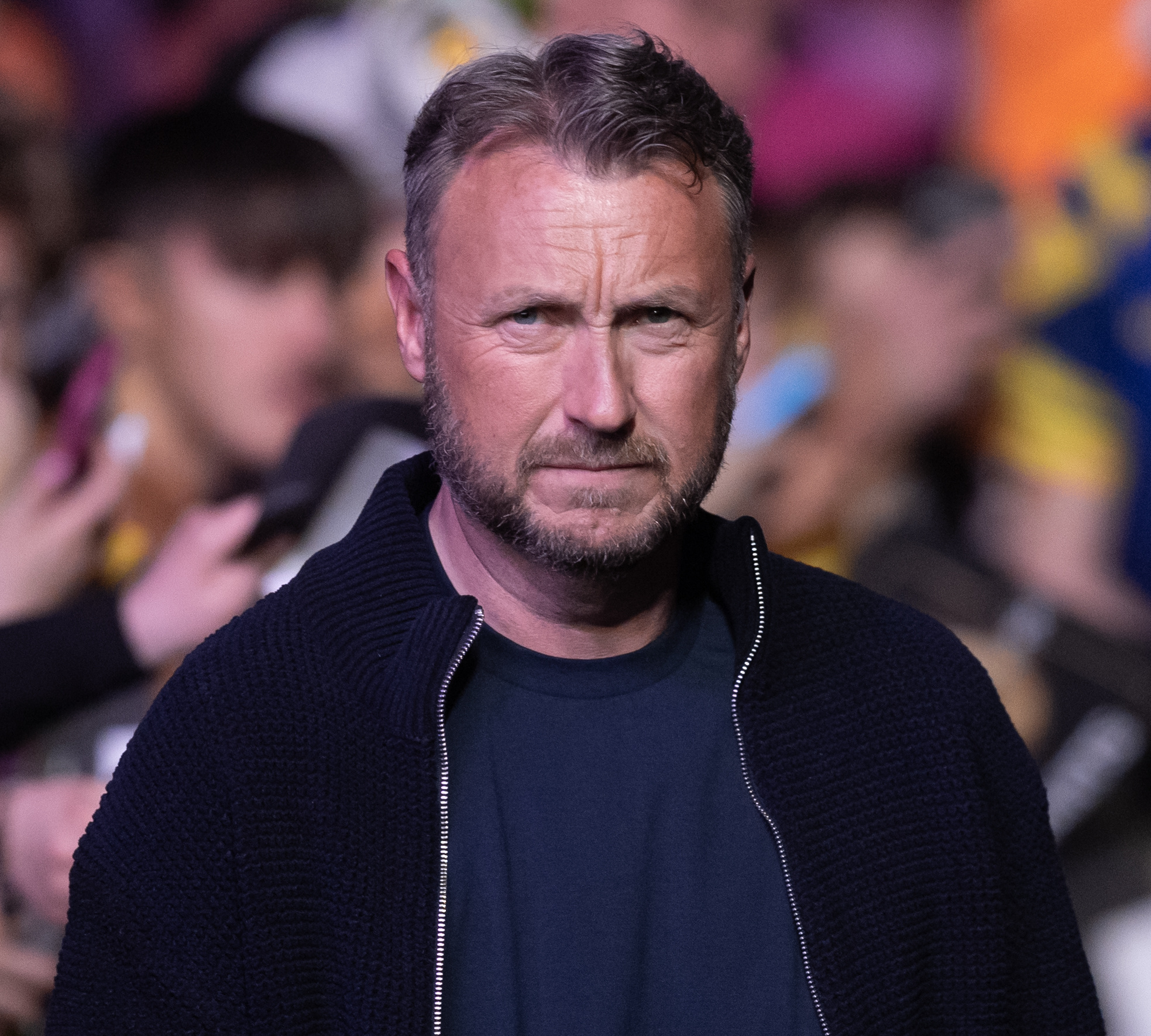
- Mardle in 2026

Personal information
- Nickname: "Hawaii 501"
- Born: 10 May 1973 (age 53) Tottenham, London, England
- Home town: Romford, London, England

Sport
- Sport: Darts
- Playing since: 1986
- Darts: 22g Target Signature
- Laterality: Right-handed
- Walk-on music: "Hawaii Five-O Theme" by The Ventures

Organisation (see split in darts)
- BDO: 1993–2002
- PDC: 2002–2011

WDF major events – best performances
- World Championship: Semi-final: 2001
- World Masters: Last 16: 2001
- World Trophy: Last 32: 2002, 2007
- Finder Masters: Quarter-final: 2000
- Dutch Open: Winner (1): 2000

PDC premier events – best performances
- World Championship: Semi-final: 2004, 2005, 2006, 2008
- World Matchplay: Runner-up: 2003
- World Grand Prix: Quarter-final: 2005
- UK Open: Last 16: 2004
- Grand Slam: Group Stage: 2007, 2008, 2009
- European Championship: Last 16: 2008
- Premier League: 5th: 2008
- Desert Classic: Runner-up: 2004, 2005
- PC Finals: Last 16: 2009

Other tournament wins
- Years
British Teenage Open	1989
Denmark Open	2001
Vauxhall Autumn Open	2002
Vauxhall Autumn Pro	2002, 2003
Vauxhall Spring Open	2004, 2006
Players Championships (x3)
2004 (x1); 2007 (x2)
UK Open Regionals/Qualifiers
UK Open Regional (Midlands)	2004
- Updated on 17 February 2008

Wayne Mardle (born 10 May 1973) is an English former professional darts player who competed in Professional Darts Corporation (PDC) and British Darts Organisation (BDO) events. He finished as the runner-up in three PDC majors, losing to Phil Taylor in the final on each occasion. He was also a five times world championship semi-finalist (four PDC and one BDO). He currently works as a pundit and commentator.

He has been known as "Hawaii 501" since 2000, a play on the title of the popular television series Hawaii Five-O, due to the Hawaiian shirts he started wearing in 1998 for a bet, and 501 being the start score of a leg of darts. This dress sense coupled with his crowd-pleasing onstage activity (such as dancing to the interval music) saw him become one of the most popular players on the circuit.

== Early life and career ==
Mardle was born in Tottenham, North London, England. He started playing darts at the age of 11, when he practised with his dad. His first 180 came two weeks after he started playing. He soon became better than his dad, and his first competition win was in a pub called the 'Double Top' on his thirteenth birthday in 1986.

His Lakeside debut came in 2000, where he lost to Matt Clark in the first round. In 2001, he reached the semi-finals, beating Co Stompé and Ronnie Baxter before losing to eventual winner John Walton. His attempt in 2002 saw him fall in the last eight to Colin Monk.

== PDC career ==
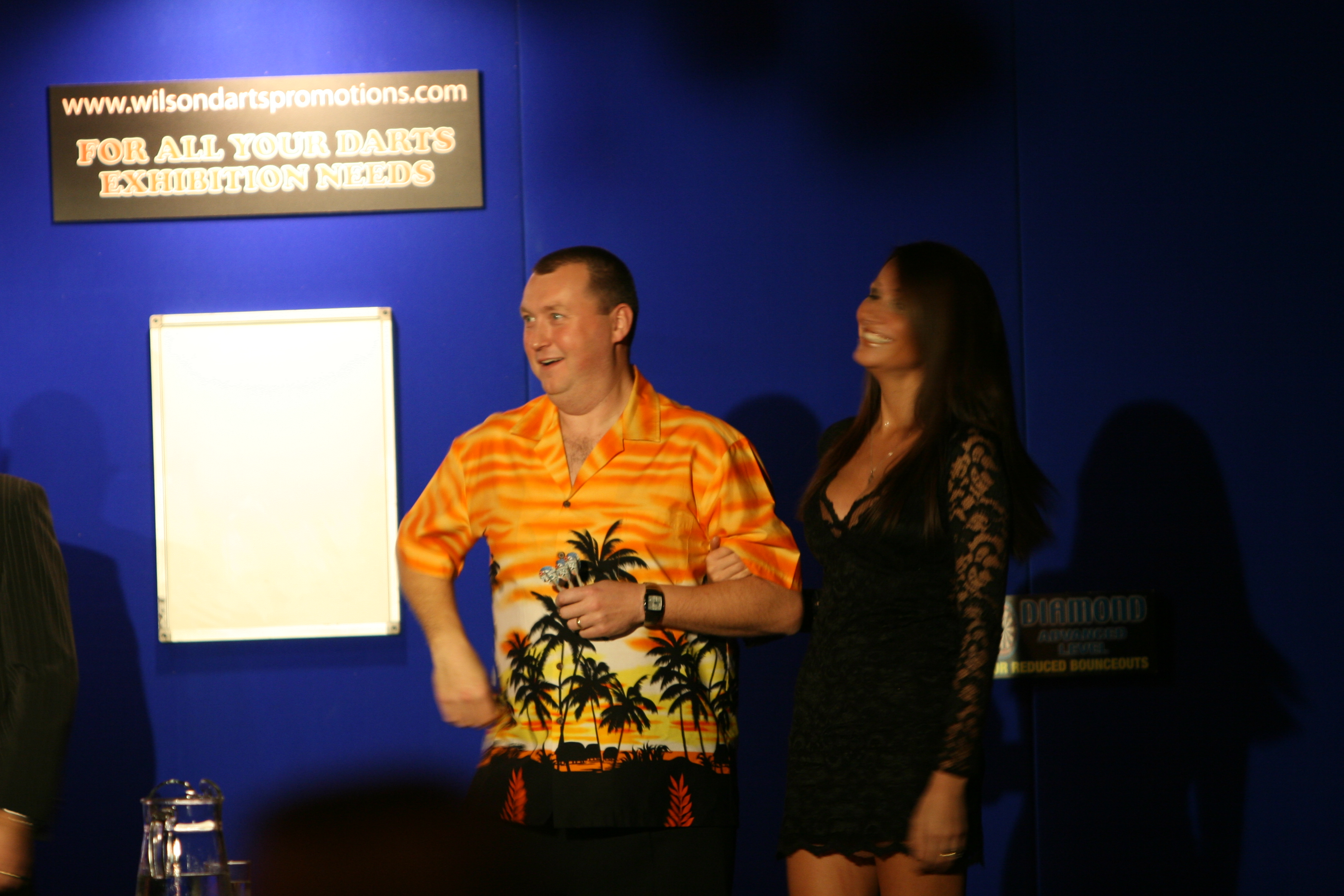
Mardle in 2007

Mardle joined the Professional Darts Corporation in time for the 2003 World Championship. His first appearance at the Circus Tavern saw him lose in the third round to Phil Taylor. His debut at Blackpool's Winter Gardens in the World Matchplay was better, beating World Champion John Part, Alan Warriner and Colin Lloyd to reach the final, where he again lost to Taylor. From 2004 to 2006, Mardle reached three consecutive world championship semi-finals, losing to Taylor in 2004 and 2006, and Mark Dudbridge in 2005. He peaked at fifth in the World Rankings.

Mardle played in the first two editions of the Premier League in 2005 and 2006, finishing bottom of the table in both years. Poor form meant he was not selected in 2007, though he returned in 2008 and 2009.

In 2007, Mardle was beaten in the opening round of the World Championship by unseeded Alan Caves, and subsequently failed to reach the latter stages of a single event that year. He found form at the 2008 World Championship, and in a big upset he beat then-13-time champion Phil Taylor 5–4 in the quarter-finals, a match in which he had trailed 3–0. This was the first time in the history of the PDC championship that Taylor had been beaten before the final. After his win over Taylor, Mardle was made bookmakers' favourite to win the tournament, especially as his semi-final opponent was 21-year-old qualifier Kirk Shepherd, ranked 142nd. Mardle lost the match 6–4. He later described his attitude going into the match as "nonchalant" and stated that he did not give Shepherd the respect he deserved.

In January 2008 Mardle was confirmed as the Sky Sports wildcard entry to the 2008 Premier League following his performance at the World Championships. Whilst this decision was questioned by some, Mardle proved the doubters wrong with a steady campaign which saw him finish in fifth place, missing out on the Play-Offs by just two legs to Adrian Lewis. He reached the semi-finals of the 2008 World Matchplay, losing 17–5 to James Wade.

At the 2009 Premier League, Mardle amassed only four points from his opening nine games, then missed week ten due to a virus. He had been due to return the following week, but was rushed into hospital the day before the matches due to mumps. With five matches to play in the final three weeks, one more missed week would eliminate Mardle from the competition. Having been passed fit for a week twelve return, Mardle was re-admitted to hospital, and in accordance with tournament regulations, was removed from the tournament. His results from the tournament were also annulled. Mardle later stated that his form never recovered after his six-month absence due to mumps.

Mardle made his final World Championship appearance in 2010, losing 3–0 to Jyhan Artut in the first round, averaging only 72. Mardle continued to drop out the rankings and was ranked as low as 85th in the Order of Merit.

Mardle also attempted to qualify for the 2012 PDC World Championship via the PDPA qualifier which was held in Wigan and was whitewashed 5–0 in the preliminary round by Ken Dobson.

Mardle's slide down the world rankings meant he was no longer assured of a PDC tour card to play on the Pro Tour, and had to enter the Q School to try and earn one. However, on the eve of the first Q School qualifier, Mardle announced on his Twitter page that he had decided not to go to Q School and instead focus on commentating for Sky Sports and playing in exhibitions.

== Commentary ==
Mardle made his commentating debut for the PDC at the 2011 PDC World Darts Championship, working alongside Sid Waddell in a few matches. He also co-presented some of the event with Dave Clark and predicting some of the match results with Rod Harrington and Eric Bristow. Mardle continued his analyzing and commentary career at the 2011 Premier League Darts apart from weeks 3, 5, 9, 10, 11 and 14.

He continued his commentary career in the 2012 PDC World Darts Championship, where he co-commentated on every night of the televised event. He has since become a regular on all Sky televised tournaments both as a commentator during matches and as the main pundit in the studio portions of the show. During the World Championships Mardle also has regular segments where he rewards crowd participation, either dancing, fancy dress outfits or funny signs, with a "Wayne's World" T-shirt.

== Personal life ==
In 2006, Mardle had a darts book published (co-authored with Ian Spragg) entitled Hawaii 501 – Life as a Darts Pro. It chronicles the ups and downs of his life as a professional player during 2005.

Mardle supports the football team Tottenham Hotspur and appeared in the May 2009 edition of Hotspur, the football club's official club magazine.

On 15 December 2024, shortly before the start of the 2025 PDC World Darts Championship, it was announced that his wife Donna had died earlier in the week at age 52.

== World Championship results ==
=== BDO ===
- 2000: 1st round (lost to Matt Clark 1–3)
- 2001: Semi-finals (lost to John Walton 3–5)
- 2002: Quarter-finals (lost to Colin Monk 4–5)

=== PDC ===
- 2003: 3rd round (lost to Phil Taylor 3–5)
- 2004: Semi-finals (lost to Phil Taylor 2–6)
- 2005: Semi-finals (lost to Mark Dudbridge 4–6)
- 2006: Semi-finals (lost to Phil Taylor 5–6)
- 2007: 1st round (lost to Alan Caves 2–3)
- 2008: Semi-finals (lost to Kirk Shepherd 4–6)
- 2009: 3rd round (lost to Co Stompé 0–4)
- 2010: 1st round (lost to Jyhan Artut 0–3)

== Career finals ==
=== PDC major finals: 3 ===
Legend
World Matchplay (0–1)
Las Vegas Desert Classic (0–2)

Outcome	No.	Year	Championship	Opponent in the final	Score
Runner-up	1.	2003	World Matchplay	Phil Taylor	12–18 (l)
Runner-up	2.	2004	Las Vegas Desert Classic	Phil Taylor	4–6 (s)
Runner-up	2.	2005	Las Vegas Desert Classic (2)	Phil Taylor	1–6 (s)

== Performance timeline ==
BDO

Tournament	2000	2001	2002	2007
BDO World Championship	1R	SF	QF	PDC
World Masters	DNP	L16	DNP	
World Darts Trophy	NH		DNP	1R
International Darts League	Not held			RR

PDC

Tournament	2002	2003	2004	2005	2006	2007	2008	2009	2010	2011
PDC World Championship	DNP	3R	SF	SF	SF	1R	SF	3R	1R	DNQ
Premier League Darts	Not held			7th	7th	DNP	5th	~~RR~~	DNP	
Las Vegas Desert Classic	QF	RR	RU	RU	1R	2R	1R	1R	NH	
WSoD/US Open	Not held				QF	5R	4R	NH		
UK Open	NH	4R	5R	3R	4R	3R	3R	3R	3R	2R
World Matchplay	DNP	RU	1R	QF	QF	2R	SF	2R	DNQ	
World Grand Prix	DNP	2R	1R	QF	2R	2R	2R	1R	DNQ	
Grand Slam of Darts	Not held					RR	RR	RR	DNQ	
European Championship	Not held						2R	DNQ		
Masters of Darts	Not held			RR	NH	RR	Not held			

Performance Table Legend
W	Won the tournament	F	Finalist	SF	Semifinalist	QF	Quarterfinalist	#R; RR; Prel.	Lost in # round Round-robin; Preliminary round	DQ	Disqualified
DNQ	Did not qualify	DNP	Did not participate	WD	Withdrew	NH	Tournament not held	#R; RR; Prel.	Lost in # round Round-robin; Preliminary round	NYF	Not yet founded
