= 2005 Las Vegas Desert Classic =

Tournament information
- Dates: 28 June–3 July 2005
- Venue: MGM Grand Casino and Hotel
- Location: Las Vegas, Nevada
- Country: United States
- Organisation(s): PDC
- Format: Sets; Final – best of 11
- Prize fund: £84,100
- Winner's share: £15,000
- High checkout: 164 (Canada) John Part

Champion(s)
- (England) Phil Taylor

The 2005 Las Vegas Desert Classic was the 2005 edition of the Las Vegas Desert Classic darts tournament on 27 June until 3 July 2005. It was held at the MGM Grand Las Vegas, and was won by Phil Taylor.

== Qualified Players ==
=== Pro Qualified players ===
PDC Top 12
1. (England) Colin Lloyd
2. (England) Phil Taylor
3. (England) Peter Manley
4. (Netherlands) Roland Scholten
5. (England) Ronnie Baxter
6. (England) Wayne Mardle
7. (Canada) John Part
8. (England) Kevin Painter
9. (England) Denis Ovens
10. (England) Andy Jenkins
11. (England) Mark Dudbridge
12. (England) Alan Warriner

North American Qualifiers
1. (United States) John Kuczynski
2. (United States) Darin Young
3. (United States) George Walls

Canadian Number One
1. (Canada) Gerry Convery

=== Qualifiers ===
Saturday Qualifiers
- (England) Darren Webster
- (Belgium) Erik Clarys
- (England) Wes Newton
- (England) Adrian Lewis
- (England) James Wade
- (England) Andy Smith
- (England) Andy Hamilton
- (England) Chris Mason

Sunday Qualifiers
- (United States) Ray Carver
- (England) Mark Holden
- (England) Adrian Gray
- (England) Steve Hine
- (England) Alex Roy
- (England) Andy Callaby
- (England) Mark Walsh
- (England) Lionel Sams

== Prize Fund ==
Stage (no. of players)		Prize money (Total: £84,100)
Winner	(1)	$15,000
Runner-up	(1)	$7,500
Semi-finalists	(2)	$5,000
Quarter-finalists	(4)	$3,500
Round 2	(8)	$2,000
Round 1	(16)	$1,350

== Results ==
=== Men's tournament ===
Round 1 (best of 3 sets); 27-28 June
(England) Phil Taylor	2
(England) Mark Holden	0
(England) Andy Jenkins	2
(England) Andy Smith	0
(England) Kevin Painter	2
(England) Adrian Lewis	0
(England) Alex Roy	2
(Canada) Gerry Convery	1
(England) Wes Newton	2
(United States) George Walls	0
(England) Mark Walsh	2
(England) Peter Manley	1
(United States) Ray Carver	2
(England) Denis Ovens	1
(England) Adrian Gray	2
(United States) John Kuczynski	1
(England) Wayne Mardle	2
(England) Lionel Sams	1
(England) Andy Callaby	2
(England) Mark Dudbridge	1
(England) Colin Lloyd	2
(England) Steve Hine	0
(Belgium) Erik Clarys	2
(England) Alan Warriner	0
(Canada) John Part	2
(England) Darren Webster	0
(United States) Darin Young	2
(England) Andy Hamilton	0
(Netherlands) Roland Scholten	2
(England) Chris Mason	0
(England) James Wade	2
(England) Ronnie Baxter	1

Round 2 (best of 5 sets); 29-30 June
(England) Phil Taylor	3
(England) Andy Jenkins	0
(England) Kevin Painter	3
(England) Alex Roy	2
(England) Wes Newton	3
(England) Mark Walsh	0
(United States) Ray Carver	3
(England) Adrian Gray	2
(England) Wayne Mardle	3
(England) Andy Callaby	0
(England) Colin Lloyd	3
(Belgium) Erik Clarys	0
(Canada) John Part	3
(United States) Darin Young	2
(Netherlands) Roland Scholten	3
(England) James Wade	1

Quarter-finals (best of 5 sets); 1 July
(England) Phil Taylor 102.30	3
(England) Kevin Painter 92.70	1
(England) Wes Newton 87.84	3
(United States) Ray Carver 84.45	1
(England) Wayne Mardle 96.78	3
(England) Colin Lloyd 100.47	2
(Canada) John Part 89.16	3
(Netherlands) Roland Scholten 85.98	1

Semi-finals (best of 7 sets); 2 July
(England) Phil Taylor 107.04	4
(England) Wes Newton 95.58	0
(England) Wayne Mardle 97.89	4
(Canada) John Part 95.25	2

Final (best of 11 sets); 3 July
(England) Phil Taylor 101.97	6
(England) Wayne Mardle 94.77	1

=== Women's tournament ===
Semi-finals
(England) Trina Gulliver	W
(United States) Stacy Bromberg	L
(England) Deta Hedman	W
(England) Tricia Wright	L

Final (best of 11 legs)
(England) Trina Gulliver	6
(England) Deta Hedman	1
