= 2007 World Grand Prix (darts) =

2007 Sky Bet World Grand Prix

Tournament information
- Dates: 8–14 October 2007
- Venue: Citywest Hotel
- Location: Dublin, Ireland
- Organisation(s): Professional Darts Corporation (PDC)
- Format: Sets "double in, double out"
- Prize fund: £200,000
- Winner's share: £50,000
- High checkout: 156 Andy Hamilton

Champion(s)
- James Wade (ENG)

The 2007 Sky Bet World Grand Prix was the tenth staging of the PDC World Grand Prix which took place between 8 and 14 October 2007. It was the seventh year that the event was being staged at the Citywest Hotel, Dublin, Ireland. Phil Taylor went into the event as defending champion having won it for the previous two years - and seven times in all, but suffered a surprise first round defeat to Adrian Gray.

James Wade followed up his success at the 2007 World Matchplay by adding this title to his collection. He beat World Champion Raymond van Barneveld in the semi-final and Terry Jenkins in the final. Jenkins suffered his fifth televised final defeat in twelve months as his search for his first major title continued.

The top 24 players in the PDC Order of Merit qualified automatically. There were four further qualifiers from the PDPA Players Championship Order of Merit (the best performers from up to 20 non-televised events during the year) and there were four PDPA Irish qualifiers. The All-Ireland qualifiers were held on 16 September.

As in previous years, the format of the tournament features much shorter first round matches (best of three sets) and players must start each leg on a double, as well as finish on a double.

== Prize money ==
The 2007 event has an increased prize fund of £200,000.

Position (num. of players)		Prize money (Total: £200,000)
Winner	(1)	£50,000
Runner-Up	(1)	£20,000
Semi-finalists	(2)	£10,000
Quarter-finalists	(4)	£7,500
Second round losers	(8)	£5,000
First round losers	(16)	£2,500

== Qualification ==
PDC Top 16
1. (England) Phil Taylor (first round)
2. (Netherlands) Raymond van Barneveld (semi-finals)
3. (England) James Wade (winner)
4. (England) Terry Jenkins (runner-up)
5. (England) Peter Manley (first round)
6. (England) Colin Lloyd (quarter-finals)
7. (England) Adrian Lewis (quarter-finals)
8. (England) Andy Hamilton (first round)
9. (England) Dennis Priestley (first round)
10. (Netherlands) Roland Scholten (second round)
11. (England) Wayne Mardle (second round)
12. (Canada) John Part (semi-finals)
13. (Wales) Barrie Bates (first round)
14. (England) Kevin Painter (first round)
15. (England) Ronnie Baxter (first round)
16. (England) Andy Jenkins (second round)

PDPA Players Championship qualifiers
1. (England) Mark Dudbridge (quarter-finals)
2. (England) Denis Ovens (first round)
3. (England) Colin Osborne (first round)
4. (England) Chris Mason (second round)
5. (England) Alan Tabern (second round)
6. (England) Wayne Jones (first round)
7. (England) Andy Smith (second round)
8. (England) Wes Newton (first round)
9. (England) Mervyn King (second round)
10. (England) Alex Roy (second round)
11. (Netherlands) Vincent van der Voort (first round)
12. (England) Adrian Gray (quarter-finals)

Irish qualifiers
1. (Republic of Ireland) Jason Barry (first round)
2. (Republic of Ireland) James Keogh (first round)
3. (Northern Ireland) John Elder (first round)
4. (Republic of Ireland) Billy Matthews (first round)

== Race for the Premier League ==
The World Grand Prix is the cut-off point for qualification for the 2008 Premier League. The top six players in the world rankings after this tournament will seal automatic qualification for the lucrative event. Phil Taylor, Raymond van Barneveld, James Wade, Terry Jenkins and Peter Manley all looked assured of a place - but a good run at this tournament for any number of players could have stolen the last guaranteed place in the league. Adrian Lewis secured the spot when John Part lost in the semi-finals. Part needed to win the event to climb to sixth in the rankings. Two further players will receive a wildcard at a later date.

== Draw ==
Players in bold denote match winners.

**First round** (best of 3 sets); 8–9 October
1	(England) Phil Taylor 87.69	0
(England) **Adrian Gray** 89.14	**2**
(England) Ronnie Baxter 68.94	1
(England) **Andy Smith** 78.00	**2**
8	(England) Andy Hamilton 74.45	1
(England) **Wayne Mardle** 82.88	**2**
(Canada) **John Part** 80.51	**2**
(Republic of Ireland) Billy Matthews 73.06	0
5	(England) Peter Manley 80.07	1
(England) **Mark Dudbridge** 76.22	**2**
(Republic of Ireland) Jason Barry 74.21	1
(England) **Andy Jenkins** 81.66	**2**
4	(England) **Terry Jenkins** 83.45	**2**
(England) Wayne Jones 83.05	1
(England) **Chris Mason** 85.57	**2**
(England) Colin Osborne 87.00	0
2	(Netherlands) **Raymond van Barneveld** 89.07	**2**
(Netherlands) Vincent van der Voort 74.96	1
(Northern Ireland) John Elder 83.91	0
(England) **Mervyn King** 82.30	**2**
7	(England) **Adrian Lewis** 83.35	**2**
(Republic of Ireland) James Keogh 70.31	0
(England) Kevin Painter 71.51	1
(Netherlands) **Roland Scholten** 76.36	**2**
6	(England) **Colin Lloyd** 87.04	**2**
(England) Dennis Priestley 90.14	0
(England) **Alan Tabern** 81.60	**2**
(Wales) Barrie Bates 70.07	1
3	(England) **James Wade** 94.80	**2**
(England) Denis Ovens 81.00	0
(England) **Alex Roy** 79.23	**2**
(England) Wes Newton 77.53	1

**Second round** (best of 5 sets); 10–11 October
(England) **Adrian Gray** 78.98	**3**
(England) Andy Smith 78.69	1
(England) Wayne Mardle 81.09	0
(Canada) **John Part** 87.83	**3**
(England) **Mark Dudbridge** 81.86	**3**
(England) Andy Jenkins 75.96	2
4	(England) **Terry Jenkins** 81.62	**3**
(England) Chris Mason 84.31	2
2	(Netherlands) **Raymond van Barneveld** 84.91	**3**
(England) Mervyn King 79.65	0
7	(England) **Adrian Lewis** 82.44	**3**
(Netherlands) Roland Scholten 76.49	1
6	(England) **Colin Lloyd** 89.52	**3**
(England) Alan Tabern 84.14	0
3	(England) **James Wade** 76.60	**3**
(England) Alex Roy 72.62	1

**Quarter-finals** (best of 7 sets); 12 October
(England) Adrian Gray 86.62	2
(Canada) **John Part** 80.48	**4**
(England) Mark Dudbridge 82.78	1
4	(England) **Terry Jenkins** 85.57	**4**
2	(Netherlands) **Raymond van Barneveld** 92.48	**4**
7	(England) Adrian Lewis 83.39	3
6	(England) Colin Lloyd 79.17	0
3	(England) **James Wade** 82.81	**4**

**Semi-finals** (best of 9 sets); 13 October
(Canada) John Part 83.71	3
4	(England) **Terry Jenkins** 90.36	**5**
2	(Netherlands) Raymond van Barneveld 84.00	1
3	(England) **James Wade** 90.43	**5**

**Final** (best of 11 sets); 14 October
4	(England) Terry Jenkins 84.58	3
3	(England) **James Wade** 86.03	**6**
