= Adrian Gray =

English darts player (born 1981)

Personal information
- Nickname: "The Conqueror"
- Born: 28 February 1981 (age 45) Hastings, East Sussex, England
- Home town: St Leonards-on-Sea, East Sussex, England

Sport
- Sport: Darts
- Playing since: 1999
- Darts: 21g Trinidad Adrian Gray
- Laterality: Right-handed
- Walk-on music: "Freestyler" by Bomfunk MC's

Organisation (see split in darts)
- PDC: 2002–

PDC premier events – best performances
- World Championship: Last 32: 2007
- World Matchplay: Last 32: 2007, 2008
- World Grand Prix: Quarter-finals: 2007
- UK Open: Last 16: 2003
- Championship League: Initial groups: 8th, 2008
- Desert Classic: Quarter-finals: 2008
- US Open/WSoD: Last 64: 2007

Other tournament wins
- Years
Soft Tip Dartslive Asia Open	2014
Soft Tip Dartslive Singapore	2015

Adrian Gray (born 28 February 1981) is an English darts player who plays in Professional Darts Corporation (PDC) events.

== Career ==
Gray made his televised debut at the 2003 UK Open. He only began playing darts at the age of 18, and within three years had defeated players such as three-time world champion John Part.

He made his debut in the PDC World Darts Championship in 2006, defeating Ronnie Baxter in the first round before losing to Darren Webster. Gray's run to the semi-finals at the Antwerp Darts Trophy in 2007 saw him earn a Stan James World Matchplay qualifying spot but he lost 10–12 to Kevin Painter in the first round.

Gray had previously come through to win a place at the 2005 Las Vegas Desert Classic, where he overcame American John Kuczynski in the first round before going down to Ray Carver.

He produced a major upset at the 2007 World Grand Prix when he became only the third player in the history of the tournament to defeat Phil Taylor. Despite losing the first two legs of their first-round match, Gray took five successive legs to move within one of the match. In the fourth leg of the second set, Gray hit back-to-back 180s and finished the match with a double seven.

Hoping to build on his success over Taylor in Ireland, Gray suffered a disappointing first round exit from the 2008 World Championship, losing 3–2 to Mark Walsh. This was followed up by a disappointing 2008 UK Open, losing 9–4 to Chris Thompson in the third round. However, Gray bounced back in the 2008 Las Vegas Desert Classic, reaching the quarter-finals for the first time in the competition before being defeated by Taylor.

Gray suffered a first-round exit in the 2009 PDC World Darts Championship in a 3–0 defeat against Newcastle-born Australian Paul Nicholson, losing all nine legs in the match.

In January 2012, Gray entered the PDC 'Q School'. On the third day of action he earned a PDC Pro Tour card with a 6–5 win over John Scott after also beating Geoff Kime, Steven Pearson and Brian Kirk before reaching the final stage. His best result of 2012 came in October, when he reached the semi-finals of the 15th Players Championship. He beat the likes of Brendan Dolan and Andy Hamilton, before losing 4–6 to Peter Wright.

He went into 2013 ranked world number 74. At the UK Open he beat Steve Brown, Connie Finnan and Dean Stewart to reach the fourth round, where he met Phil Taylor. Taylor averaged 105 in the match as he comfortably beat Gray 9–2. He advanced to the quarter-finals of the 10th Players Championship of the year where he lost 6–1 to Andrew Gilding. Gray entered Q School in January 2014 and had his best run on the second day when he was beaten 5–4 by Stuart White in the last 32. He did not do enough over the four days to earn a tour card and only had PDPA Associate Member status for 2014 which gave him entry to UK Open and European Tour qualifiers as well as the Challenge Tour. He qualified for the UK Open and was whitewashed 5–0 by Ronny Huybrechts in the second round. In April, Gray beat Yuji Eguchi to win the Soft Tip Dartslive Asia Open and $15,000. A second soft tip title came in 2015 when he took the Dartslive Singapore event by defeating Hyun Chul Park.

In January 2019, Gray regained his PDC Tour Card via the Q-School Order of Merit, sealing at least two years on the ProTour. Two last 16 appearances in the first 18 events were followed by a run to the semi-finals of Players Championship 20, where Gray beat the likes of Max Hopp, Justin Pipe, Nathan Aspinall and Steve Beaton before succumbing to Peter Wright.

== World Championship results ==
=== PDC ===
- 2007: Second round (lost to Darren Webster 1–4)
- 2008: First round (lost to Mark Walsh 2–3)
- 2009: First round (lost to Paul Nicholson 0–3)

== Personal life ==
Gray lives in St Leonards-on-Sea in East Sussex. He is not a full-time professional – he makes his living as a carpet fitter, where he is a business partner with Colin Barnes. In 2006, Gray and Barnes were named East Sussex carpet fitters of the year – a title Gray referred to when interviewed on stage later that year. Gray also darts for the Hastings side in the East Division of the Sussex Superleague, alongside other former prominent PDC player Shayne Burgess.
