= 2003 World Matchplay =

2003 Stan James World Matchplay

Tournament information
- Dates: 27 July–2 August 2003
- Venue: Winter Gardens
- Location: Blackpool
- Country: England
- Organisation(s): PDC
- Format: Legs
- Prize fund: £80,000
- Winner's share: £15,000
- High checkout: 160 (England) Colin Lloyd

Champion(s)
- (England) Phil Taylor

The 2003 Stan James World Matchplay was a darts tournament held in the Empress Ballroom at the Winter Gardens, Blackpool.

This was the fourth World Matchplay tournament to be sponsored by UK bookmaker Stan James. The tournament ran from 27 July–2 August 2003, and was won by Phil Taylor.

== Prize money ==
The prize fund was £80,000.

Position (no. of players)		Prize money (Total: £80,000)
Winner	(1)	£15,000
Runner-Up	(1)	£8,000
Semi-finalists	(2)	£5,000
Quarter-finalists	(4)	£2,750
Second round	(8)	£2,000
First round	(16)	£1,250

== Seeds ==
1. (England) Phil Taylor
2. (England) Colin Lloyd
3. (England) Alan Warriner
4. (England) Peter Manley
5. (England) Ronnie Baxter
6. (Canada) John Part
7. (Netherlands) Roland Scholten
8. (England) Denis Ovens
9. (England) Dennis Smith
10. (England) Dave Askew
11. (England) Wayne Mardle
12. (England) Kevin Painter
13. (England) John Lowe
14. (England) Andy Jenkins
15. (Wales) Richie Burnett
16. (Scotland) Jamie Harvey

== Results ==
First round (best of 19 legs); 27–29 July
1	(England) Phil Taylor 108.12	10
(England) Les Fitton 85.26	0
16	(Scotland) Jamie Harvey 83.91	10
(England) Simon Whatley 82.65	3
8	(England) Denis Ovens 89.73	11
(England) Steve Beaton 89.34	9
9	(England) Dennis Smith 83.10	10
(United States) Steve Brown 77.49	3
5	(England) Ronnie Baxter 81.72	4
(England) Bob Anderson 91.41	10
12	(England) Kevin Painter 87.90	10
(England) Alex Roy 90.60	12
4	(England) Peter Manley 81.36	10
(England) Mark Holden 70.83	1
13	(England) John Lowe 76.77	3
(England) Keith Deller 85.50	10
2	(England) Colin Lloyd 88.23	10
(England) Terry Jenkins 87.63	8
15	(Wales) Richie Burnett 81.27	10
(England) Cliff Lazarenko 70.77	3
7	(Netherlands) Roland Scholten 81.03	5
(England) Peter Evison 80.59	10
10	(England) Dave Askew 83.70	7
(England) Mark Dudbridge 87.69	10
6	(Canada) John Part 90.30	10
(England) Dennis Priestley 82.80	8
11	(England) Wayne Mardle 96.75	10
(England) Paul Williams 91.08	7
3	(England) Alan Warriner 86.07	10
(England) Mark Walsh 77.37	7
14	(England) Andy Jenkins 81.05	14
(England) Mick Manning 78.81	12

Second round (best of 25 legs); 29–30 July
1	(England) Phil Taylor 102.12	13
16	(Scotland) Jamie Harvey 86.43	3
8	(England) Denis Ovens 90.95	13
9	(England) Dennis Smith 92.73	15
(England) Bob Anderson 88.56	11
(England) Alex Roy 86.13	13
4	(England) Peter Manley 83.13	13
(England) Keith Deller 83.67	11
2	(England) Colin Lloyd 85.83	13
15	(Wales) Richie Burnett 85.32	10
(England) Peter Evison 86.07	13
(England) Mark Dudbridge 86.19	11
6	(Canada) John Part 92.52	14
11	(England) Wayne Mardle 93.42	16
3	(England) Alan Warriner 85.59	13
14	(England) Andy Jenkins 82.05	8

Quarter-finals (best of 31 legs); 31 July
1	(England) Phil Taylor 94.50	16
9	(England) Dennis Smith 88.65	7
(England) Alex Roy 80.43	5
4	(England) Peter Manley 90.81	16
2	(England) Colin Lloyd 84.99	16
(England) Peter Evison 82.02	11
11	(England) Wayne Mardle 93.21	16
3	(England) Alan Warriner 86.97	8

Semi-finals (best of 33 legs); 1 August
1	(England) Phil Taylor 91.17	17
4	(England) Peter Manley 89.04	10
2	(England) Colin Lloyd 81.00	11
11	(England) Wayne Mardle 82.71	17

Final (best of 35 legs); 2 August
1	(England) Phil Taylor 94.38	18
11	(England) Wayne Mardle 97.44	12
