= Phil Taylor (darts player) =

English darts player (born 1960)

- Taylor in 2026

Personal information
- Full name: Philip Douglas Taylor
- Nicknames: "The Power" "The Crafty Potter"
- Born: 13 August 1960 (age 66) Stoke-on-Trent, England

Sport
- Sport: Darts
- Darts: 26g Target Signature Gen 11
- Laterality: Right-handed
- Walk-on music: "The Power" by Snap!

Organisation (see split in darts)
- BDO: 1987–1993
- PDC: 1993–2018 (founding member)

WDF major events – best performances
- World Championship: Winner (2): 1990, 1992
- World Masters: Winner (1): 1990
- World Trophy: Winner (1): 2006
- Int. Darts League: Quarter-final: 2006

PDC premier events – best performances
- World Championship: Winner (14): 1995, 1996, 1997, 1998, 1999, 2000, 2001, 2002, 2004, 2005, 2006, 2009, 2010, 2013
- World Matchplay: Winner (16): 1995, 1997, 2000, 2001, 2002, 2003, 2004, 2006, 2008, 2009, 2010, 2011, 2012, 2013, 2014, 2017
- World Grand Prix: Winner (11): 1998, 1999, 2000, 2002, 2003, 2005, 2006, 2008, 2009, 2011, 2013
- UK Open: Winner (5): 2003, 2005, 2009, 2010, 2013
- Grand Slam: Winner (6): 2007, 2008, 2009, 2011, 2013, 2014
- European Championship: Winner (4): 2008, 2009, 2010, 2011
- Premier League: Winner (6): 2005, 2006, 2007, 2008, 2010, 2012
- Championship League: Winner (4): 2008, 2011, 2012, 2013
- Desert Classic: Winner (5): 2002, 2004, 2005, 2008, 2009
- US Open/WSoD: Winner (3): 2006, 2007, 2008
- PC Finals: Winner (3): 2009, 2011, 2012
- Masters: Winner (1): 2013
- Champions League: Winner (1): 2016
- World Series Finals: Semi-final: 2015, 2016

WSDT major events – best performances
- World Championship: Quarter-final: 2022, 2023
- World Matchplay: Runner-up: 2022
- World Masters: Runner-up: 2022
- Champions: Quarter-final: 2023, 2024

Other tournament wins
- Years
PDC World Cup of Darts (team event)	2012, 2013, 2015, 2016
Masters of Darts	2005
News of the World Championship	1997
WDC UK Masters	1994
WDC UK Matchplay	1996
WDF Europe Cup Singles	1990, 1992
WDF Europe Cup Pairs	1990
WDF Europe Cup Teams	1990, 1992
WDF World Cup Team	1991
World Team Championship	1996
Jocky Wilson Cup	2009
World Cricket Championship	2010

Other achievements
2006	PDC Player of the Year
2007	PDC Fans' Player of the Year
2008	Fans' Player of the Year, PDC Player of the Year and PDPA Player's Player of the Year
2009	PDC Player of the Year, PDPA Players' Player of the Year, Fans' Player of the Year and Best PDC Pro Tour Player
2010	Inaugural inductee into Stoke-on-Trent Sporting Hall of Fame
- Updated on 24 December 2016

Philip Douglas Taylor (born 13 August 1960) is an English former professional darts player. Nicknamed "the Power", he dominated darts across three decades and is considered the greatest darts player of all time, having won 214 professional tournaments, including a record 87 major titles and a record 16 World Championships. In 2015, the BBC rated Taylor among the ten greatest British sportsmen of the last 35 years.

Taylor took up darts seriously in his mid-twenties and was sponsored and mentored in his early professional career by five-time world champion Eric Bristow. An unseeded 125/1 outsider at the 1990 BDO World Darts Championship, he defeated Bristow 6–1 in the final to win his first world title at age 29. He won his second world title in 1992, defeating Mike Gregory 6–5 in a tiebreak leg after Gregory had missed six championship darts.

In 1993, Taylor was among 16 top players who broke away from the British Darts Organisation (BDO) to form the World Darts Council, later renamed the Professional Darts Corporation (PDC). He won the PDC World Darts Championship eight consecutive times from 1995 to 2002, reached 14 consecutive finals from 1994 to 2007 and reached 21 world finals overall, all of which are records. He held the world number one ranking for thirteen years in total, including eight in a row from 2006 to 2013. He won 70 PDC Pro Tour events, which was a record until Michael van Gerwen surpassed it in February 2019. Taylor hit a record 11 televised nine-dart finishes (and 22 overall). He was the first person to hit two nine-dart finishes in the same match.

Taylor won the PDC Player of the Year award six times (2006, 2008, 2009, 2010, 2011 and 2012) and was twice nominated for the BBC Sports Personality of the Year, in 2006 and 2010; in the latter year, he finished as runner-up, making him the first darts player to finish in the top two. He was inducted into the PDC Hall of Fame in 2011. He retired from professional darts after the 2018 World Championship, where he finished as runner-up. He competed in the first three World Seniors Darts Championships from 2022 to 2024 but no longer plays darts competitively.

== Early life ==
Philip Douglas Taylor was born on 13 August 1960 in Stoke-on-Trent, the only child of Douglas and Elizabeth Taylor. His father worked at Platt's tile factory in Tunstall and the family lived in a dilapidated terraced house nearby, sleeping downstairs because the upstairs was condemned and boarded up. His childhood home had no electricity or running water, and he often scavenged for scrap metal or coal with his parents. As a child, Taylor enjoyed watching boxing, and he played cricket for Mill Hill Middle School in Tunstall. After leaving school at 16, he worked in a variety of manual jobs, including as a sheet metal worker, but his main occupation became manufacturing ceramic toilet roll holders, for which he earned £52 a week.

In 1977, when he was 17, Taylor met 15-year-old Yvonne at a disco in Tunstall. In 1982, after dating for five years, they began living together in a terraced house in Burslem that Taylor had purchased for £7,500, paying a mortgage of £80 a month. The first of their four children was born the following year. Taylor's father had taught him to play darts, and he occasionally played money games in pubs against county players, using his winnings to buy household items for the family home. He once won £500, which he used to have an electric shower fitted. "It was great. You'd have thought we were in Buckingham Palace," he commented.

In 1985, Taylor and Yvonne attended an exhibition match in Smallthorne by then-reigning world champion Eric Bristow, who had recently moved to North Staffordshire. After Taylor claimed he could beat Bristow, Yvonne bought him a new set of darts for his 25th birthday. He started practising regularly, often at Bristow's pub, the Crafty Cockney (now the Moorland Inn) in Burslem. Within two years, Taylor was playing county darts for Staffordshire alongside Bristow. Impressed by Taylor's potential, Bristow lent him £10,000 to take care of his family as he established himself as a professional darts player, on condition that he give up his job in the ceramics industry.

== Early career (1987–1993) ==
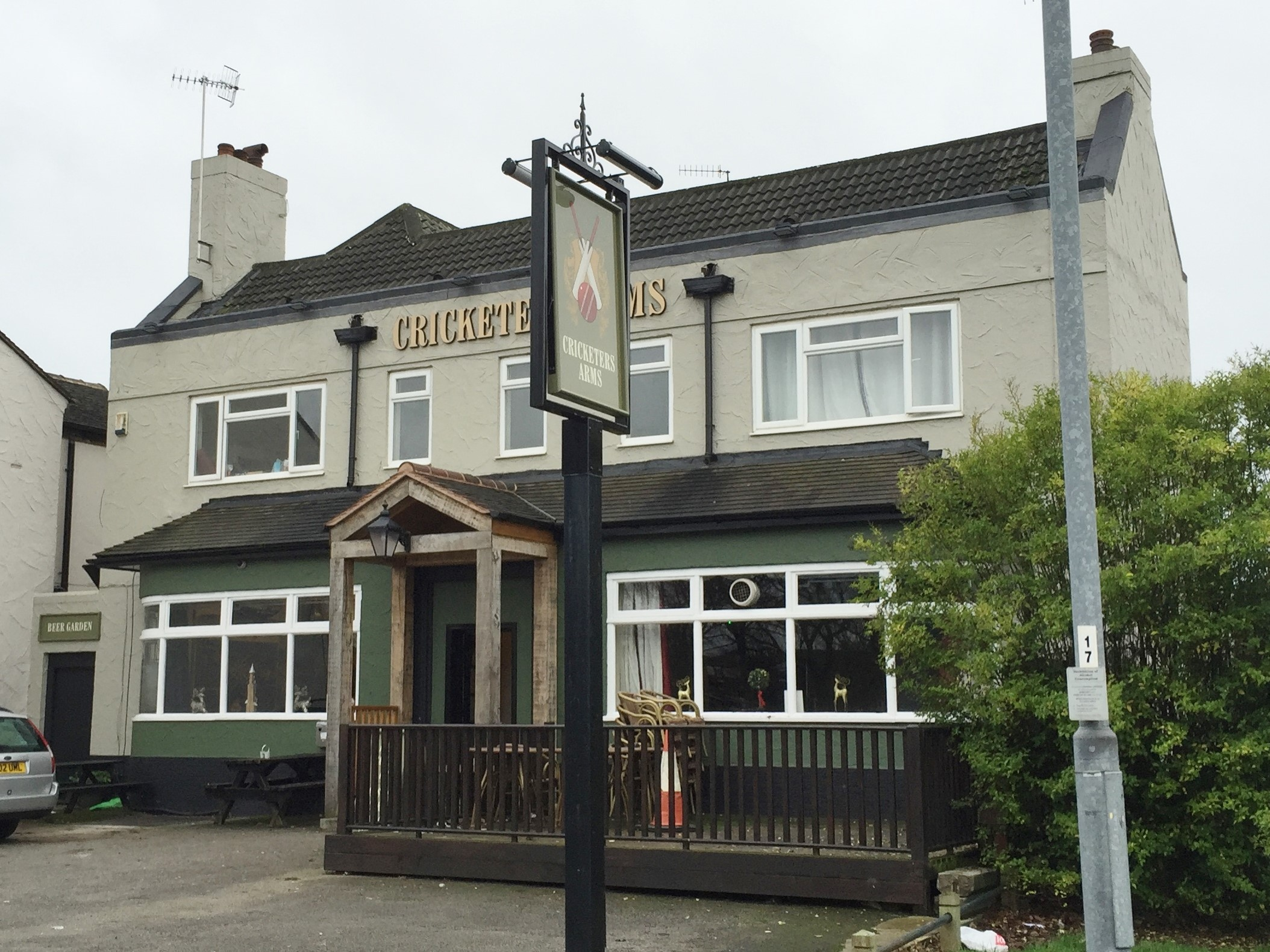
The Cricketers Arms, where Taylor became the landlord in 1993

Bristow sponsored Taylor and they travelled to Las Vegas where Taylor was beaten in the first round of the North American Open as he struggled during his first year on tour.

Taylor's first title came at the Canadian Open in 1988, defeating then World Champion Bob Anderson in the final. After reaching the quarter-final of the British Open and the semi-final of the Winmau World Masters in 1989, he qualified for the World Championship for the first time in 1990. Although he had achieved some success in Open events, he went into the 1990 World Championship as a 125–1 unseeded outsider. He beat number six seed Russell Stewart 3–1 in the first round, Dennis Hickling 3–0 in the second round, Ronnie Sharp 4–2 in the quarter-finals and Cliff Lazarenko 5–0 to reach the final. He would then meet his mentor, Eric Bristow.

Bristow had been suffering with dartitis since 1986 but had recovered his world number one ranking to be the top seed in the event. After sharing the first two sets, Taylor beat Bristow 6–1 in sets (Note: Each set is best of five legs of 501 points each.) to claim his first world title. For the rest of 1990, Taylor dominated the Open events taking the titles in the Isle of Man, Finland, North America, Denmark as well as the British Pentathlon, British Masters, Europe Cup and the game's second major tournament at the time, the Winmau World Masters.

Taylor's defence of the World Championship in 1991 ended at the quarter-final stage with a loss to Dennis Priestley, who went on to win his first world title. He picked up fewer titles in 1991 losing both his Danish Open and World Masters titles in finals to Rod Harrington. Taylor regained the World Championship title the following year beating Mike Gregory 6–5 in the final in a deciding leg. Gregory had missed six darts to win the title himself. Taylor has described the win as one of the favourites of his career. In 1993, Taylor became the landlord at the Cricketers Arms in Newcastle-under-Lyme.

== Split in darts ==
From a peak during the 1980s, the game of darts had lost many sponsors and almost all television coverage. Players felt that the BDO was no longer serving the interests of the game at the top level. In 1993, Taylor was among a group of top players, which included every previous world champion, who broke away from the game's ruling body, the British Darts Organisation, and formed their own organisation, the World Darts Council (WDC), later renamed the Professional Darts Corporation (PDC).

In the 1993 World Championship, the last unified World Championship to be held, Taylor lost in the second round to Kevin Spiolek. The BDO refused to allow the new organisation to set up and run their own tournaments, so the WDC players decided that they would no longer compete in the BDO World Championship. They founded the WDC World Darts Championship as an alternative. In the first WDC World Championship in 1994, Taylor lost to Priestley. However, Taylor would go on to dominate the event for the following decade and beyond.

== PDC career ==
=== 1994 to 1998 ===
After losing to Priestley in the final of the first PDC World Championship in 1994, Taylor began to dominate the event. Rod Harrington reached his first World Championship final in 1995 and, although he had won his previous three finals against Taylor in 1991 and 1992, Taylor took the title 6–2. It would be Harrington's only appearance in a World Final.

The finals of 1996, 1997 and 1998 would all feature Taylor and Priestley in a repeat of the inaugural final in 1994. Priestley achieved the first 100 average in a final in 1996 but still lost 6–4. The 1997 final saw Taylor recover from 0–2 down to win the title 6–3, and the 1998 final saw Taylor lose just two legs in the entire match en route to a 6–0 win and an average of 103.98. Taylor's victory and sixth title in 1998 meant that he had surpassed his mentor Eric Bristow's haul of five World Championships.

Taylor's record at Blackpool in the WDC's second major event, the World Matchplay, was not as strong early in his career as it has been in recent times. Taylor lost to Bob Anderson in 1994, Peter Evison in 1996 and Ronnie Baxter in 1998. However, he still won the event twice in the first five years of its existence, beating Priestley 16–11 in 1995 and Alan Warriner-Little 16–11 in 1997.

=== 1999 to 2004 ===
Taylor stretched his PDC World Championship unbeaten run to a record eight consecutive years beating Peter Manley in the 1999 and 2002 finals, Priestley for a fourth time in 2000, and John Part in 2001. Part would finally end the run by beating Taylor 7–6 (sets) in the 2003 World Championship final. Sid Waddell attributed this defeat to a weight-loss of three stone which he claimed affected Taylor's balance and resulted in him throwing "a quarter to half an inch below the 60 bed". Taylor went into the game a 1/7 favourite with bookmakers, but Part raced into leads of 3–0 and 4–1. Taylor fought back before ultimately being defeated 7–6.

Taylor would improve his record at Blackpool during this spell. After losing the 1999 semi-final of the World Matchplay to Manley, he would go on to win the title for the next five years (2000–2004) beating five different opponents in the final: Alan Warriner-Little (2000), Richie Burnett (2001), John Part (2002), Wayne Mardle (2003) and Mark Dudbridge (2004). By the end of 2004, Taylor had won 11 World Championships and seven World Matchplays.

Taylor has faced the incumbent BDO World Champion in challenge matches on two occasions. In 1999, he beat Raymond van Barneveld by 21 legs to 10 in a one-hour challenge dubbed "The Match of the Century" at the Wembley Conference Centre. The second challenge match came in 2004 against Andy Fordham at the Circus Tavern. Taylor was leading 5–2 in sets when Fordham, suffering a suspected asthma attack, abandoned the match.

=== 2004 to 2008 ===
Taylor reclaimed the World Championship in 2004 after edging Kevin Painter in the final 7–6 following a sudden death leg. After the match, having trailed 4–1 and 5–3, Taylor described himself as "a very lucky man" claiming that "Kevin out-played me". Referring to the epic World Championship final the previous year in which he had been defeated by John Part, Taylor added: "Last year was a good final, but this is one of the best".

Taylor would continue his dominance throughout 2005. However, after winning his 13th World Championship title in January 2006, he lost four matches in televised tournaments during the first half of the year. He lost to Jelle Klaasen and Simon Whitlock in the International Darts League tournament, and twice in a row to Raymond van Barneveld in the UK Open and the Las Vegas Desert Classic. He bounced back in the second half of the year to win the World Matchplay, the World Darts Trophy (a BDO affiliated event), and the World Grand Prix.

The 2007 World Final was contested between Taylor and Raymond van Barneveld. The match was tied at 6–6 in sets with van Barneveld leading 2–1 in legs. However, Van Barneveld missed four darts and Taylor tied the set at 2–2. The set went to 5–5 before van Barneveld won the sudden death leg for his fifth World Championship (four with the BDO and one with the PDC). Taylor said: "Of all the finals I've played in, I would probably put this one as the best."

=== 2007 to 2008 ===
Chris Mason hit the headlines for criticising Taylor in the newspapers before their last 16 match at the 2007 World Championship and allegedly swearing at him during the post-match handshake on-stage after Taylor beat him 4–0. He did apologise to Taylor after the tournament ended, but received a £750 fine and a four-month ban (suspended for 12 months) from the Darts Regulation Authority.

2007 proved to be Taylor's most barren year in terms of major title success. He was defeated at the International Darts League and the World Darts Trophy in the Netherlands. At the UK Open in Bolton, he suffered an 11–4 loss to van Barneveld. He lost to Mark Dudbridge at the Las Vegas Desert Classic, and lost at the World Matchplay in Blackpool. At the World Grand Prix in Dublin, he lost to Adrian Gray. Taylor feared that his career was in decline but vowed to continue until 2012.

Having appeared in 14 out of 14 PDC World Darts Championship finals between 1994 and 2007, Taylor's record run came to an end in 2008 where he was beaten in the quarter-final. This was the first time that he had not reached the final stage of the PDC World Darts Championship. Taylor had been taken to the final set in each of his first three rounds before eventually losing to Wayne Mardle 5–4 (sets) after winning the opening three sets.

Before the start of the Premier League tournament, Taylor unveiled some new black 26g darts. After a poor start to his Premier League Darts campaign which included three defeats in his first four matches, Taylor ultimately finished at the top of the Premier League standings. He beat Adrian Lewis 11–1 with a 112.68 average in the semi-final, and went on to win his fourth consecutive Premier League title with a 16–8 victory over Wade whilst averaging 108.36. He won his second US Open title in May 2008, defeating Colin Lloyd in the final. At the UK Open, Taylor was defeated 10–9 in the quarter-final by Raymond van Barneveld.

Taylor went on a surge of form from the spring of 2008, by winning his fourth Las Vegas Desert Classic title. Taylor then went on to win the World Matchplay, World Grand Prix, the inaugural European Championship, and the Grand Slam of Darts.

=== 2009 to 2011 ===
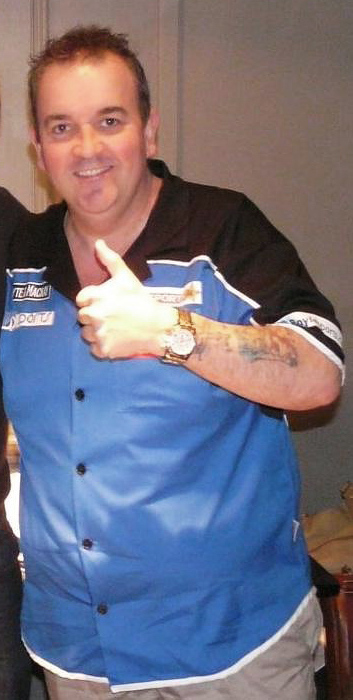
Taylor in 2009

In the 2009 world final, Taylor beat Raymond van Barneveld 7–1 for his fourteenth World Championship title. His 110.94 three-dart average was the highest recorded in a PDC final. His average during the course of the tournament was 104.08. In June, Taylor beat Colin Osborne 11–6 in the final of the UK Open. It was his third title overall at the event and his first since 2005. His tournament average was 107.38.

More success followed throughout 2009 with Taylor winning his fifth Las Vegas Desert Classic at what was the final instalment of the event. Taylor would also win the World Matchplay, the World Grand Prix, the European Darts Championship (achieving an overall 3-dart average per tournament of 111.54) and, for the third successive time, the Grand Slam of Darts in November.

Taylor began 2010 by winning his fifteenth World Championship title. He beat Simon Whitlock in the final 7–3 with an average of 104.38 and sealed victory with a 131 checkout. Taylor lost in the semi-final of the Players Championship at the Circus Tavern in Purfleet. Whilst attempting to defend the title he won in 2009 at the inaugural staging of the event, Taylor lost to eventual champion Paul Nicholson. Taylor admitted, following his defeat, that he had had little time to practice after his World Championship win. Taylor made history in the 2010 Premier League final against defending champion James Wade by hitting two nine-dart finishes in the same match. This was the first time that this had been done in professional darts.

By the summer of 2010, Taylor was the holder of the World Championship, the World Matchplay, the Premier League, the UK Open, the European Championship, the World Grand Prix and the Grand Slam of Darts. In fact, the only major televised title not held by Taylor at this time was the Players Championship Finals. At the UK Open, Taylor broke the world record for the highest average in a televised game by averaging 118.66 against Kevin Painter in round four- he won the match 9–0. These noteworthy performances, in addition to his longevity, contributed to Taylor's nomination for the BBC Sports Personality of the Year award in 2010. He was voted runner-up to A.P. McCoy.

However, defeats in the World Grand Prix, the Grand Slam, as well as a surprising loss to Mark Webster five sets to two in the quarter-final of the 2011 World Championship, meant that Taylor began 2011 as holder of four major titles- the World Matchplay, the Premier League, the European Championship and the UK Open. He would bounce back and win his first major tournament in seven months at the 2011 Players Championship by beating Gary Anderson 13–12 in a thrilling final.

Taylor went on to win the World Matchplay for a record 12th time in 18 years in 2011. He beat Mark Hylton 10–8 in the 1st round, Wayne Jones 13–7 in the 2nd round, Wes Newton 16–5 in the quarter-final, Andy Hamilton 17–9 in the semi-final and James Wade 18–8 in the final. His overall tournament average was more than 106.

One week later, Taylor went to Düsseldorf to compete in the 2011 European Championship. He was aiming to win his fourth consecutive European title and did just that by beating John Michael 6–3, Mervyn King 10–3, Paul Nicholson 10–7, Simon Whitlock 11–4 and Adrian Lewis 11–8. He had a tournament average of 105.15.

Taylor competed in the Championship League. In the winner's group, Taylor won all seven of his qualifying games. He beat Gary Anderson 6–5, Steve Beaton 6–3, Mervyn King 6–3 (hitting his 10th nine-dart finish in competition in the process), Mark Walsh 6–3, Simon Whitlock 6–5, Paul Nicholson 6–1 and Dennis Priestley 6–2 to qualify top of the group. He beat Steve Beaton 6–1 in the semi-final and Paul Nicholson 6–1 in the final to win his second Championship League title. Taylor won £6,600 in the group stages as well as a further £10,000 for winning the title.

In November, Taylor won the Grand Slam of Darts by beating Gary Anderson in the final 16–4.

=== 2012 ===
In 2012, Taylor failed to make the quarter-finals of the PDC World Championship for the first time in his career following a shock four sets to one defeat in the second round by Dave Chisnall.

Taylor, looking to improve upon England's second round exit in 2010, represented England alongside Adrian Lewis in his second World Cup of Darts. A comfortable 5–1 win over Wales booked England's place in the final against the Australian pairing of Simon Whitlock and Paul Nicholson. Taylor won both his singles matches. However, England lost the doubles meaning that the tie was level on points at 3–3 and consequently, would require a sudden-death leg. It proved to be a tense finale as Australia missed four darts to win the title. Taylor also missed two before Lewis took out double five to clinch England's first World Cup of Darts title.

Four days later, Taylor played Lewis in the first week of the 2012 Premier League and managed to draw 7–7 from a 6–1 deficit. He averaged 112.79, which was until 2015 the highest average achieved by someone without actually winning the match. Taylor hit the ninth televised nine-darter of his career in the second week of the Premier League on the way to an 8–5 win against Kevin Painter. Two weeks later, he beat Simon Whitlock 8–4 and registered the highest three-dart average in the history of the tournament of 117.35. In week 13, Taylor beat James Wade 8–1 and averaged 116.10 in the process. Taylor ended the league campaign top of the table (eight points ahead of second placed Simon Whitlock) and was the only player to have a positive leg difference. In the 14 game league phase, Taylor had registered five of the top fifteen televised three-dart averages in the history of the game. In the semi-finals, he faced James Wade against whom he had inflicted heavy 8–1 and 8–2 defeats during the league stage. The semi-final, however, was much more competitive. Taylor trailed early on before winning four consecutive legs to lead 6–4 before Wade responded to level at 6–6. Taylor then took out a 149 finish, with Wade on 57, to break before closing out the match 8–6 to reach the final against Simon Whitlock. Taylor looked to be heading for a comfortable win in the final as he raced into a 7–2 lead. However, the Australian stormed back to level at 7–7. Nevertheless, Taylor held his nerve to win the last three legs of the match to complete a 10–7 win and to seal his sixth Premier League title.

Taylor won the third event of the Players Championship in March with a 6–1 victory over Wes Newton while averaging 113.54. He also hit a nine-darter earlier in the tournament during his second round match against Tony West. He reached the final of the fourth Players Championship event a day later where he lost 6–5 to Dave Chisnall. Taylor hit his second nine-dart finish of the weekend in a first round match against Peter Hudson.

In June, Taylor looked on course to win his fifth UK Open title after registering convincing wins over Ronnie Baxter, Terry Jenkins and Denis Ovens to book a place in the final against Robert Thornton. Taylor won the first two legs, but the Scot then won nine of the next 10 before closing out the match 11–5. Taylor had missed a total of 23 darts at doubles and, in doing so, suffered his sixth defeat in a major PDC final out of the 72 he had contested. Taylor then played in his first European Tour event and gained revenge for his defeat in the World Championship by beating Chisnall 6–2 in the final. He had beaten Raymond van Barneveld 6–5 in the quarter-finals and Wes Newton 6–3 in the semis at the event in Berlin. In July, Taylor walked off the stage at the Shetland Open during a semi-final match with Raymond van Barneveld.

Taylor then won his fifth consecutive World Matchplay title and thirteenth in total. He beat Mervyn King 10–8, Ian White 13–3, Andy Hamilton 16–11 and Ronnie Baxter 17–10 to face James Wade in the final for the fourth time. The final proved to be tight and tense, with Taylor edging it 18–15 and extending his unbeaten run at the event to 25 games.

In September, Taylor suffered defeat in the European Championship for the first time in a 10–6 quarter-final loss to Brendan Dolan. He averaged just 89.88 in a defeat which ended his run of four consecutive titles stretching back to the inaugural tournament in 2008. Taylor then lost to Thornton in a major event for the second time this year as he missed six match darts on the way to a three sets to two defeat in the second round of the World Grand Prix.

Taylor qualified from Group 4 of the Championship League winning all nine of his games and concluding with a 6–1 win over Mark Walsh. In the winners' group, he won each of his seven league matches before defeating Dave Chisnall 6–0 in the semi-finals (averaging 112.73) and Simon Whitlock 6–4 in the final (averaging 108.20) to clinch his third Championship League title.

Taylor finished second in Group A of the Grand Slam of Darts to face Michael van Gerwen in the last 16. It was a match that was billed as a clash between the two best players in the world. Taylor averaged 105 but failed to hit a single maximum as van Gerwen hit seven and averaged 108 in a 10–5 win.

Taylor lost in consecutive Players Championship finals over the last weekend of November to both Chisnall and Van Gerwen, averaging 110 in the latter. He finished sixth on the ProTour Order of Merit to qualify for the Finals where he won his third title. Taylor defeated Mark Webster and Adrian Lewis in the first two rounds, but was then 9–5 down in the quarter-finals to Andy Hamilton in a best of 19 legs match. However, Taylor allowed Hamilton only one chance to win the match when on a 60 finish. Hamilton missed the board with his first dart and failed to hit double 20 with his third as Taylor won the five consecutive legs he required to win 10–9. He outplayed Simon Whitlock in the semi-finals in an 11–2 victory and, with the scores at 5–5 in the final against Kim Huybrechts, Taylor produced a devastating run of form to win eight of the following nine legs to secure the title.

=== 2013 ===
Taylor won his 16th World Championship at the 2013 staging of the event. He lost nine legs on the way to the semi-finals where he played Raymond van Barneveld. Before the match, Taylor had taken offence to comments made by van Barneveld about not being scared of him and wanting to face him rather than Taylor's quarter-final opponent Andy Hamilton. Taylor raced into a five sets to one lead and withstood a strong fightback from van Barneveld before winning 6–4. After the match, Taylor reacted angrily when van Barneveld attempted to pull him back to congratulate him after their handshake. The pair were escorted from the stage separately by security staff. The next day, Taylor apologised for his behaviour which he described as "disgraceful". Taylor faced Michael van Gerwen in the final and, from 4–2 down, won five sets in a row to become the first man to lift the Sid Waddell Trophy. A day later, he was named the PDC Player of the Year.

Taylor retained his World Cup of Darts crown alongside Adrian Lewis in February. They survived two match darts against South Africa in the last 16 and one against Wales in the semi-finals before facing the Belgian brothers Ronny and Kim Huybrechts in the final. Taylor beat Ronny 4–0 and went into his second singles match knowing that a win against Kim would secure the title. He did just that by virtue of a 4–1 win.

Taylor did not finish top of the Premier League for the first time this year. He won eight, drew four and lost four of his 16 matches to finish third in the table. He played Van Barneveld in the semi-finals who he had beaten 7–3 and drawn with 6–6 during the league stage. From 3–3, Taylor surged ahead to triumph 8–4 and book his spot in the final against Van Gerwen. Taylor started the better of the two as he led 5–3 at the break. However, he then lost four successive legs upon the resumption of play. In the 14th leg, Van Gerwen opted not to go for the bull when on 87 and Taylor stepped in to hit a 160 finish to level the match at 7–7. At 9–8 down, Taylor had left 40 after 12 darts. Nonetheless, Van Gerwen hit a 132 finish on the bull to seal a 10–8 win and the title.

Taylor won his fifth UK Open title at his next event. He had to compete in the second round due to being ranked 44th on the UK Open Order of Merit after competing in four of the eight Qualifiers and not advancing beyond the quarter-finals in any of them. At the tournament, he dropped three legs in his first three matches before getting lucky in the last 16 against Brendan Dolan. Dolan missed three match darts to win 9–7 before Taylor threw an 11 dart leg in the decider. He produced an average of 106.56 to beat Van Gerwen 10–7 before easing past Peter Wright 10–5 in the semi-finals and Andy Hamilton 11–4 in the final. Taylor's combined average during the six matches he played was more than 100.

Taylor then won the Gibraltar Darts Trophy. He dropped just seven legs in the six matches he played which concluded with a 6–1 victory over Jamie Lewis in the final. However, Taylor's win in Gibraltar was later the subject of controversy as footage emerged showing him winning a leg and retrieving his dart when he had actually missed the double. Neither referee Russ Bray nor his opponent Dean Winstanley noticed the error and Taylor went on to win the match 6–1. Taylor insisted that he had not realised that the dart had missed and offered to replay the match and forfeit his prize money. The PDC released a statement blaming the incident on human error. The incident led to a feud with Taylor's old mentor Eric Bristow who stated: "The player knows if it's not in the bed and has to declare it. You don't want cheats in the game". Taylor responded by claiming that Bristow's comments were "hurtful" and that he would not be talking to Bristow again.

At the European Championship, Taylor lost in the second round to Ronny Huybrechts 10–5. Taylor then won his sixth consecutive World Matchplay crown and 14th in total by defeating Adrian Lewis 18–13 in the final with an average of 111.23, a record for a Matchplay final. His tournament average through 123 legs was 105.81. Taylor's next event was the Sydney Darts Masters which he won by beating Van Gerwen 10–3 in the final whilst averaging 109.46. Taylor continued his dominance in the major events by claiming his 11th World Grand Prix title in October. He thrashed Dave Chisnall 6–0 in sets in the final with Chisnall having to wait until the final set to pick up his first leg of the match. Taylor then won the Championship League title for the fourth time in six years. After claiming Group 1 by beating Lewis 6–1, having also hit a nine-darter earlier in the day, Taylor topped the Winners Group and went on to defeat Van Gerwen 6–3 in the final. At the inaugural staging of the Masters, a tournament which only features the top 16 on the Order of Merit, Taylor cruised to the title dropping just seven legs during the event which included 10–1 thrashings of James Wade and Lewis in the semi-finals and final respectively.

Taylor was involved in a high quality darts match in the semi-finals of the Grand Slam of Darts against Lewis as he averaged 109.76 to Lewis' 110.99 (the highest recorded combined average) in a 16–9 win. Taylor's finishing in the high scoring match proved to be the difference and included checkouts of 167 and 160. The players hit 32 180s between them breaking the PDC record of 31 which was set in the 2007 World Championship final, a match which had 32 more legs than this one. Both players described the game as the greatest they had been involved in afterwards. The final proved to be a more low-key affair as Taylor gained revenge over Robert Thornton for his loss in the 2012 UK Open to win 16–6 and seal his fifth Grand Slam title.

Taylor eased through to the final of the Players Championship Finals but fell victim to one of Van Gerwen's purple patches as, from 6–3 down, the Dutchman won seven legs in a row and went on to defeat Taylor 11–7.

=== 2014 ===
Taylor was 1/50 with bookmakers to win his second round match against Michael Smith in the 2014 World Championship but suffered a huge upset by losing 4–3 to the world number 32. Taylor lost the world number one spot to Michael van Gerwen after the event as the Dutchman won his first world title. He returned to action at the Premier League six weeks later with a new set of darts having switched manufacturers. However, Taylor suffered his first whitewash in the tournament's history as Van Gerwen thrashed him 7–0 in 13 minutes. Taylor bounced back a few days later to win the third UK Open Qualifier by defeating Adrian Lewis 6–2 and sealing the title with a nine-darter. It was his second perfect leg of the day after he had also hit one in the last 16 against Andy Hamilton. However, his poor start to the Premier League continued as he lost three of his next four games to find himself in real danger of relegation. At the UK Open, he was the victim of the biggest shock in the tournament's history as factory worker Aden Kirk, ranked world number 137 and making his television debut, beat Taylor 9–7. This run of form prompted The Guardian's Rob Smyth to write an article suggesting that Taylor's decline was now terminal.

Taylor lost 6–5 against Gary Anderson in the final of the third Players Championship. Earlier in the tournament, he had beaten Van Gerwen 6–5, who averaged 114 and hit a nine-darter. He had also seen off Terry Jenkins 6–4, who averaged 111. 24 hours later he won the fourth event following a 6–0 thrashing of Ian White in the final. Taylor played seven matches on the day and ended up with an overall average of 106.59, which included an average of 118.42 against Vincent van der Voort in the last 16. Taylor claimed another title at the German Darts Masters by beating Van Gerwen 6–4 in the final.

His form in the Premier League picked up remarkably as he remained unbeaten in his final 11 matches which included a 7–4 victory over Van Gerwen. Taylor finished third in the table for the second year in a row to qualify for the play-offs. Taylor led Raymond van Barneveld 3–0 in the semi-finals, but hit 26% of his doubles during the match and, ultimately, was defeated 8–5. This was the first time that the Dutchman had beaten him in the tournament in 21 attempts. Later, Taylor said that the six missed darts at double to move 5–2 ahead had played heavily on his mind and had made him nervous during the match- a feeling which he had never experienced before during his 26-year career.

Taylor and Lewis could not complete a hat-trick of World Cup of Darts titles as they were defeated by the Netherlands in the final. Taylor lost 4–0 to Van Gerwen, while Lewis was beaten 4–0 by Van Barneveld and 4–2 by Van Gerwen, which meant that the tie was over before Taylor's second singles match. Taylor later reflected on the first half of 2014 as the worst spell of form in his career.

Taylor threw his 10th televised nine-dart finish in the second round of the World Matchplay during a 13–6 win over Michael Smith. He returned to top form during the event beating Gary Anderson 17–15 with an average of 105.27 in the semi-finals. However, Taylor saved his best performance for the final as he raced into 7–1 and 13–2 leads over Van Gerwen and went on to seal his seventh consecutive Matchplay title and 15th in total with an 18–9 victory whilst averaging 107.27.

Taylor won the inaugural Perth Darts Masters after beating Van Gerwen in the final 11–9 whilst averaging 105.08. He then defended his Sydney Darts Masters title by beating Stephen Bunting 11–3 in the final. In the quarter-finals of the World Grand Prix, Taylor lost 3–1 against James Wade. This was the first time that Wade had beaten Taylor in a major televised knockout tournament. At the European Championship, Taylor lost 10–9 in a thriller to Stephen Bunting. Taylor comfortably progressed to the final of the Grand Slam and a meeting with Dave Chisnall. Following an initial 5–0 lead, the final was by far his closest match of the event as Chisnall fought back to 10–10, before Taylor rediscovered his best form to win another five unanswered legs and seal his sixth Grand Slam title 16–13.

=== 2015 ===
Taylor reached the semi-finals of the 2015 World Championship without facing a top 16 player. His closest game came in the third round where he edged past Kim Huybrechts 4–3. Taylor maintained his unbeaten semi-final record in World Championships as he won his 20th by beating Raymond van Barneveld 6–2 and faced Gary Anderson in the final. From 3–1 down, Taylor won nine of the next ten legs to move 4–3 up and then missed three darts to lead 5–3. Instead he fell 6–4 behind, but again rallied to draw level missing one dart at double 12 for a nine darter in the process. However, more failed attempts at doubles proved costly as he could not take out double 16 with three darts to hold throw in the deciding set and was defeated 7–6. The 32 180s the pair threw during the game broke the PDC World Championship final record of 31 which was set in Taylor's match against Van Barneveld in the 2007 final.

Taylor won the last UK Open Qualifier by overcoming Ian White 6–2 in the final. He lost 10–6 in the quarter-finals of the UK Open itself. In week seven of the Premier League, Taylor averaged 115.80 against Van Barneveld but was defeated 7–4. It is the eighth highest televised average of all-time and the highest to lose a match. He went into the penultimate round of fixtures needing a victory over Anderson to stand a chance of progressing but, when he lost 7–5, it marked the first time in the 11-year history of the event that Taylor did not qualify for the play-offs. He did average 102.95 over his 16 matches, second to Van Gerwen's 105.15. Taylor picked up his second title of the year at the ninth Players Championship with a 6–4 victory over Anderson in the final. He thrashed Anderson 11–3 in the semi-finals of the Dubai Darts Masters, before missing too many doubles from 8–6 ahead of Van Gerwen in the final, to lose 11–8. Taylor and Lewis played in the final of the World Cup against Scotland's Anderson and Peter Wright and it went all the way to the final singles match in which Lewis beat Wright to win England's third title in the event. Taylor had kicked off the final by beating Wright 4–0 whilst setting the highest individual average in the history of the event at 113.43. He followed that up by holding on from 7–2 ahead of Wright in the final of the inaugural Japan Darts Masters to edge it 8–7.

Taylor's 38-match unbeaten streak at the World Matchplay dating back to 2007 ended this year at the semi-final stage as Wade defeated him 17–14. After the event he slipped from second place to third in the Order of Merit, but then retained his Perth Darts Masters title by seeing off Wade 11–7. His third World Series of Darts win of the year came at the Sydney Darts Masters with an 11–3 thrashing of Adrian Lewis. A shock 2–0 elimination in the first round of the World Grand Prix followed at the hands of Vincent van der Voort. He also missed a dart at the bullseye for a nine-dart finish during the match.

Taylor held 3–0 and 7–3 leads over Van Gerwen in the final of the Grand Slam, but then missed far too many doubles and went on to lose 16–13. The defeat meant that Taylor held no majors for the first time since 1994.

=== 2016 ===
In the third round of the 2016 World Championship, Jelle Klaasen missed one dart to knock Taylor out and the match went to a deciding set. Taylor went 2–0 up in legs and a missed a match dart himself in the next, before Klaasen fought back to win the final set 4–2. In the semi-finals of the Masters, Taylor missed seven match darts to beat Van Gerwen and would lose 11–10. Taylor reached the final of the first UK Open Qualifier and lost to Adrian Lewis 6–2, but went one better in the third event as he averaged 109.59 in a 6–2 win over Van Gerwen to end a nine-month drought of a ranking title win. Van Gerwen broke Taylor's world record televised average with 123.40 in week four of the Premier League. An hour later Taylor averaged 115.25, currently the 12th highest of all-time as he overcame Dave Chisnall 7–5. In March, Taylor was beaten in the semi-finals of the UK Open 10–6 by Van Gerwen. He was also well beaten by Van Gerwen in his eighth Premier League final by 11 legs to 3.

Taylor and Lewis won their fourth World Cup crown by overcoming the Netherlands in the final, with Lewis beating Van Gerwen in the deciding match. Taylor competed in one PDC European Tour event during 2016, which was the Austrian Darts Open, but he won the title, defeating Michael Smith 6–4 in the final. During the final of the World Matchplay, Taylor encouraged the crowd to do a clapping chant made famous by the Icelandic football team in Euro 2016 when Van Gerwen was throwing. It did not seem to affect Van Gerwen though, as he won 18–10. Taylor is still the only player to have won the Sydney Darts Masters after he beat Van Gerwen 11–9 for his fourth title in the event.

He participated in the inaugural Champions League of Darts, an event that was broadcast on the BBC. It was the first time since 1993 that Taylor had played in an event shown by the station and he dominated it by winning 52 legs over the weekend whilst losing 19, culminating with an 11–5 victory over Van Gerwen in the final. Taylor had surprise 2–0 and 10–3 defeats to Steve West in first round of the World Grand Prix and Mensur Suljović in the quarter-finals of the European Championship. He also lost 16–10 to Peter Wright in the quarter-finals of the Grand Slam.

=== 2017 ===
Taylor matched John Lowe's record by making 28 consecutive appearances at the World Championship in the 2017 edition. He didn't drop a set in matches against David Platt and Kevin Painter and had a three sets to nil lead against Kim Huybrechts in their third round match. Huybrechts took two consecutive sets, but missed darts to force a decider and Taylor hit double seven to set up a quarter-final match against Raymond van Barneveld. In a rematch of the final ten years prior, Taylor recovered from a 3–1 deficit but lost the next two sets and, consequently, the match.

Taylor was sixth in the world rankings after the World Championship. On 27 January 2017, in an interview conducted before the start of the 2017 Masters, Taylor officially confirmed that he would retire after the 2018 World Darts Championship. He also stated that he would cut down on his non-televised appearances in the 2017 season. He did not play in the Grand Prix or UK Open. He reached the semi-finals of the Masters, losing 11–9 to Gary Anderson. He finished third in the table in the 2017 Premier League and trailed Peter Wright 4–0 in the semi-finals. Taylor gained the lead for the first time at 7–6, but missed a host of doubles including one to win the match and was beaten 10–9.

Taylor did make a final appearance at the World Matchplay, which he had previously said was his favourite tournament. He won the tournament for a sixteenth time, progressing to the final with victories over career-rivals van Barneveld (11–3), van Gerwen (16–6), Lewis (17–9), before beating Peter Wright 18–8 in the final, in what would be his last major win. Taylor also won a world series event in his final season, and reached the final of his last event in the series, which he lost to Wright. In August, Taylor won the inaugural Melbourne Darts Masters by successfully defeating Peter Wright 11–8 in the final.

=== 2018 ===
The 2018 PDC World Darts Championship was Taylor's 29th world championship appearance, surpassing the record he held jointly with John Lowe. He had previously announced that he would retire after the tournament. He entered the tournament ranked 6th in the PDC Order of Merit. Wins over Chris Dobey, Justin Pipe, Keegan Brown, Gary Anderson and Jamie Lewis took him to his 21st world final, extending his own record. However, he was beaten 7–2 in the final by Rob Cross, who was making his first appearance in the tournament. During the match, Taylor also missed a double for a nine-dart finish, which would have been his first in a world championship match. Taylor said afterwards: "I tried my best but he was like me 25 years ago, he was relentless and didn't stop putting me under pressure." He added: "It was like an old man against a young man, it was a mis-match. That's it for me because I haven't got the energy or interest to beat Michael van Gerwen or him (Cross)."

== Post-retirement ==
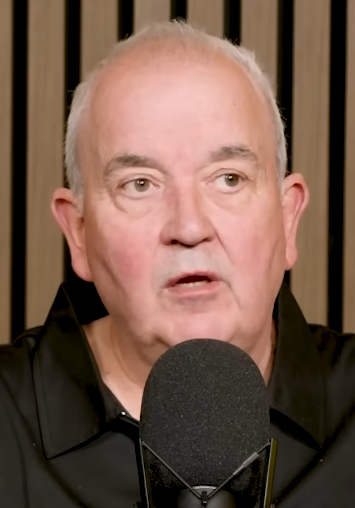
Taylor in 2026

Taylor took part in his first competitive darts event since 2018, when he entered the inaugural 2022 World Seniors Darts Championship. He lost to Kevin Painter in the quarter-finals. Taylor played his final world championship match at the 2024 World Seniors Darts Championship, where he was beaten 3–2 by debutant Manfred Bilderl.

== Rivalries ==
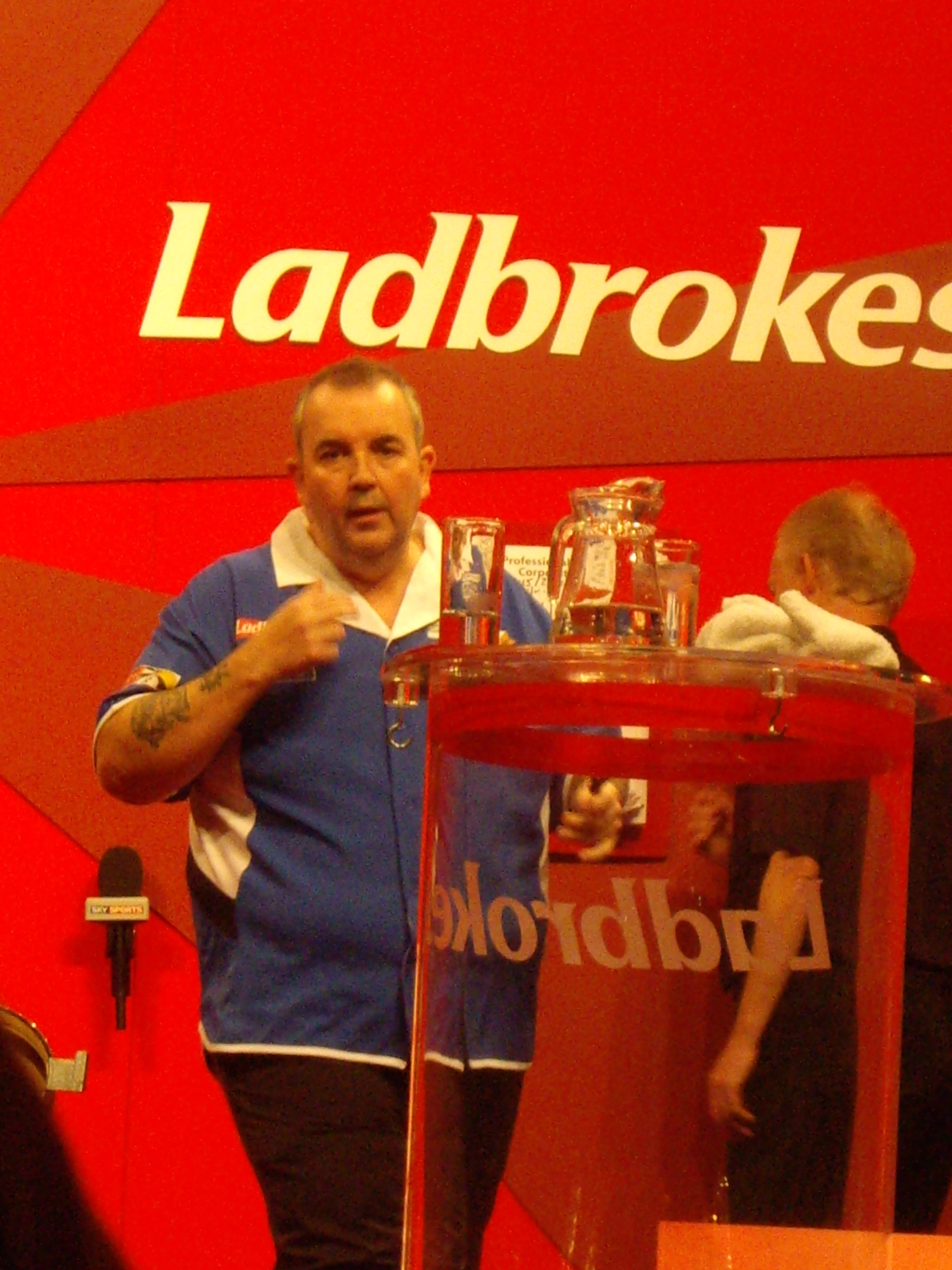
Taylor during his 2010 World Championship quarter-final match against Adrian Lewis

=== Dennis Priestley ===
Dennis Priestley and Phil Taylor played each other in five World Finals, with Priestley winning in 1994 and Taylor emerging victorious in 1996, 1997, 1998 and 2000.

Taylor and Priestley first met in major competition in the 1990 World Masters. Taylor won that semi-final encounter en route to the title. Priestley then assumed the upper hand in their rivalry, however, with victories over Taylor in the quarter-finals of the 1991 World Championship, and in the British Matchplay final later that year. Their early meetings in the WDC were also won by Priestley, who defeated Taylor in the final of the 1994 World Championship, and in the Last 16 of the 1995 UK Matchplay.

However, since Taylor's win over Priestley in the 1995 World Matchplay final, Taylor has lost once in all competitions and has not been beaten on television by Priestley since 1995. Taylor and Priestley remain great friends. At the 2009 Las Vegas championship Taylor was emotional when he beat Dennis Priestley 8–0 in the second round. He later said it was tough to beat such a great friend that way. Taylor and Priestley met in competition on at least 44 occasions, with Taylor winning 37 and Priestley winning 6, with 1 draw.

=== John Part ===
Taylor's next rivalry was with Canadian John Part, who won the BDO World Championship in 1994 and moved to the PDC in 1997. Their first meeting in the PDC came at the 2001 PDC World Championship final. The match was one-sided as Taylor averaged 107 and won 7–0. Taylor won their first five encounters including a 6–0 Quarter-final win at the 2002 PDC World Championships, a much closer match at the 2002 World Matchplay final, 18–16 and the 2002 World Grand Prix final, where Taylor again ended Part's attempt at a title by winning 7–3.

A turning point came in the 2003 World Championship, where Part and Taylor met in the final. Part took a 4–1 lead but Taylor hit back to take the lead, 5–4. At 6–6 Part held his nerve and beat Taylor 7–6 to end Taylor's eight tournament unbeaten run in the championship. Taylor's other losses to Part came in the 2003 Las Vegas Desert Classic (13–10 in the semi-final), the 2004 UK Open (8–6 in the quarter-final) and at the 2005 World Matchplay (16–11 in the quarter-final).

Part won the 2008 PDC World Championship and became the second player after Taylor to have won the tournament more than once. Taylor and Part met in competition on at least 37 occasions, with Taylor winning 31 and Part winning 6.

=== Raymond van Barneveld ===
Van Barneveld switched to the PDC in 2006. Their first clash came in the 2006 Premier League Darts tournament and ended in a 7–7 draw. The return match went in Taylor's favour. Barneveld's first PDC win over Taylor came at the 2006 UK Open with an 11–10 quarter-final success, which he followed up with success in the semi-finals of the Las Vegas Desert Classic, winning by four sets to three. Taylor later defeated van Barneveld by three sets to one in the World Grand Prix.

They then met in the final of the 2007 PDC World Championship at the Circus Tavern. The match has been described as the greatest game in the history of darts. Taylor was defeated by van Barneveld seven sets to six in a sudden-death leg. Taylor responded to his loss by defeating van Barneveld on two occasions in the 2007 Premier League Darts and beating him in the final of the inaugural US Open. Van Barneveld later defeated Taylor in the quarter-finals of the UK Open by 11 legs to four. Taylor lost his top spot in the PDC World Rankings to van Barneveld in January 2008, but regained it in June.

In major PDC tournaments in 2008, Taylor defeated van Barneveld twice in the Premier League, lost by 10 legs to nine in the quarter-finals of the UK Open, but won the World Grand Prix against his rival by six sets to two. The rivalry continued into 2009 with the two meeting in the World Championship final for a second time, with Taylor winning 7–1 with a 110.94 three-dart average. The two then met in the 2010 World Matchplay final; Taylor won 18–12, averaging more than 105, which was higher than van Barneveld's 100.11 average. After the game Barneveld acknowledged "I'm the number two at the moment, and players like James Wade, Simon Whitlock and Gary Anderson are all trying but he's just too good for everyone". The first win for Van Barneveld in a televised tournament after the 2008 UK Open came almost six years later. In the 2014 Premier League Darts the pair met three times. Twice during the league states, with both matches ending in a draw. Then, in the semi-finals they met again. After an early 4–1 lead for Taylor, the match turned around and Van Barneveld won the match 8–5 to claim his first televised victory against Taylor in more than six years. Van Barneveld defeated Taylor in both their league encounters in the 2015 Premier League, winning 7–4 and 7–2, with Taylor hitting a 115.80 average in the former. In the 2017 World Championship van Barneveld defeated Taylor in the quarter-final. Taylor and van Barneveld met in competition on at least 83 occasions, with Taylor winning 61 and van Barneveld winning 18, with 4 draws.

=== James Wade ===
James Wade has won nine PDC major titles since he burst onto the scene in 2006. Wade handed Taylor his first defeat in a Premier League match in 2008. Another major win for Wade against Taylor was in the final of Championship League Darts 2010. The quarter-finals of the 2014 World Grand Prix was the first time Wade defeated Taylor in a televised knockout match. They have met in the final of the World Matchplay four times in 2006, 2008, 2011 and 2012 with Taylor victorious each time. In the 2014 Masters, Wade knocked out Taylor in the semi-final en route to winning the tournament. In the 2015 World Matchplay Wade broke Taylor's 38 match winning streak at the Winter Gardens by defeating Taylor 17–14 in the semi-final. Taylor and Wade met in competition on at least 71 occasions, with Taylor winning 51 and Wade winning 14, with 6 draws.

=== Adrian Lewis ===
During the early part of Adrian Lewis' career until 2007, he was Taylor's protégé having practised together in their home city Stoke-on-Trent and made his television debut in 2004, aged 19, at the UK Open. However, Lewis has kicked on since then and has amassed four PDC major titles including two consecutive World titles in 2011 and 2012. The pair have been part of what has been a feisty rivalry at times. Taylor beat Lewis 5–0 in the World Championship quarterfinal in 2010. They met again in October 2010 in the World Grand Prix semi-final. Lewis would win that encounter five sets to four. Lewis and Taylor have met in four PDC major finals during their rivalry. These have included the finals of the 2008 and 2011 European Championship which Taylor won 11–5 and 11–8 respectively, the final of the 2013 Masters which Taylor won 10–1, as well as the final of the 2013 World Matchplay where Taylor averaged 111.23 and won 18–13. The latter involved Lewis playing in his first Matchplay final where he averaged 105.92 and hit 19 maximums. Taylor and Lewis met in competition on at least 74 occasions, with Taylor winning 55 and Lewis winning 17, with 2 draws.

=== Michael van Gerwen ===
In 2013, Michael van Gerwen became the world number two behind Taylor and was tipped to take over Taylor's dominance of the sport. The pair's first meeting saw Taylor win 3–2 when the Dutchman was 17 years old, before van Gerwen beat him 3–0 in the Masters of Darts and 7–6 in the International Darts League. Taylor then won 15 consecutive games against him encompassing a span of five years, during which van Gerwen struggled for form and confidence.

However, in October 2012 van Gerwen won his first PDC major and when the two met in the last 16 of the 2012 Grand Slam of Darts, the match was billed as a clash between the two best players in the world. It was this match which truly started the rivalry as both players averaged more than 110 for long parts of it, with Taylor at one point gesturing for van Gerwen to get out of his way when he paused in retrieving his darts. Van Gerwen took the match 10–5 with it being signalled as the start of a new era in darts. The two then met in a Players Championship final with van Gerwen coming back from 5–4 down with back to back finishes of 164 and 124 to win in a final against Taylor for the first time.

At the 2013 World Championship, the two met in the final, where Taylor fought back from 2–0 and 4–2 down in sets to win 7–4. Van Gerwen averaged between 105 and 108 in the early sets but as his average dropped, Taylor's average reached 103, winning five successive sets to claim his 16th title over a rival he admitted in the post-match interview was 'hard to crack'.

A few months later, van Gerwen became the first player other than Taylor to finish top of the table of the Premier League with the two meeting in the final which van Gerwen won 10–8. Afterwards Van Gerwen called Taylor the greatest and said that no one will match his achievements in darts.

Taylor then won the next three high-profile meetings which included the finals of the Sydney Darts Masters and Championship League Darts. Taylor had won six major titles since the Premier League loss, whilst Van Gerwen hadn't won any until they met in the final of the 2013 Players Championship Finals. Van Gerwen won seven successive legs from 6–3 down before emerging victorious 11–7.

In January 2014, Van Gerwen won the World Championship and replaced Taylor as the world number one, and a month later inflicted the first whitewash over Taylor in Premier League history by beating him 7–0 in 13 minutes with an average of 109.59. Van Gerwen whitewashed Taylor 4–0 in the final of the World Cup, en route to the Netherlands' 3–0 win over England. In July, they contested the final of the World Matchplay; Taylor won 11 of the first 13 legs and went on to win 18–9, averaging 107.27. The loss reduced Van Gerwen to tears on the stage afterwards. In August, the pair met in the final of the inaugural Perth Darts Masters with Taylor fighting back from 6–3 down in legs to win 11–9 whilst averaging 105.08.

At the 2016 Masters van Gerwen became the first player to win 5 matches in a row against Taylor. Taylor defeated Van Gerwen 11–5 in the final of the inaugural Champions League of Darts tournament in September 2016, having defeated him 10–4 in an earlier group match. When Taylor retired, he had played Van Gerwen 62 times, winning 34 and losing 26, with 2 draws. Taylor won 6 of his last 9 matches against Van Gerwen before his retirement.

== Nickname ==
Taylor had the nickname "The Crafty Potter" in the early 1990s, reflecting his status as the protégé of Eric Bristow (who was nicknamed "The Crafty Cockney") and his job in the ceramic industry. However, Taylor soon achieved success in his own right. In July 1995, Taylor was given the nickname "The Power" by Sky Sports production manager, Peter Judge, during the 1995 World Matchplay in Blackpool. Judge told Taylor that he should have a nickname and "The Power" became the serendipitous choice after Judge stepped on an empty CD case of Snap!'s "The Power".

== Outside darts ==
=== Personal life ===
Taylor's father, Douglas, died from bowel cancer in 1997, aged 57. His mother, Elizabeth, died from a lung condition in 2015, aged 74. Taylor married Yvonne in 1988; the couple separated in 2011 and divorced in 2016. They have four children together, three daughters and a son. In 2015, their two youngest daughters were reported to be estranged from Taylor and living on state benefits following the breakdown of their parents' marriage. One daughter, then aged 26, was reported to be unemployed and living in a hostel in Stoke-on-Trent that was also used by prostitutes and drug addicts. Their youngest daughter, then aged 22, was reported to be pregnant with her fourth child and living in a council house. Both daughters claimed that Taylor, while continuing to support his two oldest children financially, had refused their requests for assistance. During divorce hearings in 2016, Taylor's net worth was estimated at £3.4 million.

Taylor's 2003 autobiography, The Power, was ghostwritten by the late Sky TV darts commentator Sid Waddell. He was inducted into the Stoke-on-Trent Hall of Fame when it was opened in January 2011. He is a supporter of Port Vale F.C.

=== Indecent assault conviction ===
On 10 October 1999, after an exhibition match at a hotel in Leslie, Fife, Taylor offered two intoxicated 23-year-old women a lift home in his campervan, driven by a hired driver. Both women subsequently accused him of indecent assault. He denied the charges, but the matter became public knowledge in March 2001 after he was found guilty in Dunfermline Sheriff Court. One of the women testified that Taylor had tried to kiss her and unzip her trousers, before unhooking her bra and touching her breasts. The second woman testified that Taylor had put his hands down her shirt and touched her breasts beneath her bra. The women clarified that they had both verbally and physically objected to being touched. At the sentencing in May 2001, the Sheriff commented that the offences were not serious enough to merit a custodial sentence, but she fined Taylor £2,000.

As a result of his conviction, Taylor's Member of the Order of the British Empire (MBE) nomination from the 2001 New Year Honours was annulled before he was awarded it. Both of Taylor's youngest daughters later claimed that they had been bullied at school over the incident. His youngest daughter claimed that this bullying had resulted in her leaving school without any academic qualifications.

=== Television and music appearances ===
Taylor's achievements in darts have led to guest appearances on television. He made several appearances on the ITV game show Bullseye, hosted by comedian Jim Bowen and professional darts commentator Tony Green. He has also appeared on several BBC television shows.

On 2 February 2009, he made a cameo appearance in ITV's long-running soap opera Coronation Street, playing the part of 'Disco Dave', the captain of a rival darts team to the Rovers Return.

In May 2012, Taylor, together with the seven other players who competed in the Premier League, recorded a charity single with Chas Hodges and his band called "Got My Tickets for the Darts" which was written by Chas. It was released on 18 May, the night after the play-offs at the O2 in London, where it was premiered. Proceeds from the single were donated to the Haven House Children's Hospice.

== Awards and records ==
Rob Cross is the only player with a winning record against Taylor, having faced him once in the 2018 World Championship final. Taylor has a 56.67% win rate against Michael van Gerwen, the player with the most victories against him.

On 9 January 2007, Taylor won the 2006 PDC Player of the Year award at the inaugural PDC Awards Dinner held at the Dorchester Hotel in London's Park Lane. He was one of ten nominees for the BBC Sports Personality of the Year award in 2006; the award went to Zara Phillips.

Taylor was voted the 2007 Fans' Player of the Year following a vote conducted on the website Planet Darts. He received the award at the annual PDC Awards Dinner in January 2008. After his fifteenth World Championship victory, Taylor was made an inaugural inductee to the Stoke-on-Trent Sporting Hall of Fame on 7 January 2010.

Awards excluding the Hall of Fame are handed out the following January.

- PDC Player of the Year: 2006, 2008–2012
- PDC Fans' Player of the Year: 2007–2011
- Best PDC Pro Tour Player/Floor Player: 2008, 2009
- PDPA Players' Player of the Year: 2008, 2009
- Best Televised Performance of the Year: 2016
- PDC Nine-Dart Club: 2006*, 2007+, 2008*+, 2009**, 2010*, 2011*+, 2012*, 2015*+ (*: Gold Pin Badge (Televised), +: Silver Pin Badge (Non-Televised))
- PDC Hall of Fame: 2011
- BBC Sports Personality of the Year (Runner-up): 2010

== Career statistics ==
=== World Championship results ===
==== BDO ====
- 1990: Winner (beat Eric Bristow 6–1)
- 1991: Quarter-finals (lost to Dennis Priestley 3–4)
- 1992: Winner (beat Mike Gregory 6–5)
- 1993: Second round (lost to Kevin Spiolek 1–3)

==== PDC ====
- 1994: Runner-up (lost to Dennis Priestley 1–6)
- 1995: Winner (beat Rod Harrington 6–2)
- 1996: Winner (beat Dennis Priestley 6–4)
- 1997: Winner (beat Dennis Priestley 6–3)
- 1998: Winner (beat Dennis Priestley 6–0)
- 1999: Winner (beat Peter Manley 6–2)
- 2000: Winner (beat Dennis Priestley 7–3)
- 2001: Winner (beat John Part 7–0)
- 2002: Winner (beat Peter Manley 7–0)
- 2003: Runner-up (lost to John Part 6–7)
- 2004: Winner (beat Kevin Painter 7–6)
- 2005: Winner (beat Mark Dudbridge 7–4)
- 2006: Winner (beat Peter Manley 7–0)
- 2007: Runner-up (lost to Raymond van Barneveld 6–7)
- 2008: Quarter-finals (lost to Wayne Mardle 4–5)
- 2009: Winner (beat Raymond van Barneveld 7–1)
- 2010: Winner (beat Simon Whitlock 7–3)
- 2011: Quarter-finals (lost to Mark Webster 2–5)
- 2012: Second round (lost to Dave Chisnall 1–4)
- 2013: Winner (beat Michael van Gerwen 7–4)
- 2014: Second round (lost to Michael Smith 3–4)
- 2015: Runner-up (lost to Gary Anderson 6–7)
- 2016: Third round (lost to Jelle Klaasen 3–4)
- 2017: Quarter-finals (lost to Raymond van Barneveld 3–5)
- 2018: Runner-up (lost to Rob Cross 2–7)

==== WSDT ====
- 2022: Quarter-finals (lost to Kevin Painter 0–3)
- 2023: Quarter-finals (lost to Richie Howson 1–3)
- 2024: First round (lost to Manfred Bilderl 2–3)

== Nine-dart finishes ==
Phil Taylor's televised nine-dart finishes
Date	Opponent	Tournament	Method
1 August 2002	(England) Chris Mason	World Matchplay	3 x T20; 3 x T20; T20, T19, D12
5 June 2004	(England) Matt Chapman	UK Open	3 x T20; 3 x T20; T20, T19, D12
12 June 2005	(Netherlands) Roland Scholten	UK Open	3 x T20; 3 x T20; T20, T19, D12
8 May 2007	(Netherlands) Raymond van Barneveld	International Darts League	3 x T20; 3 x T20; T20, T19, D12
9 June 2007	(England) Wes Newton	UK Open	3 x T20; 3 x T20; T20, T19, D12
6 June 2008	(Scotland) Jamie Harvey	UK Open	3 x T20; 2 x T20, T19; 2 x T20, D12
24 May 2010	(England) James Wade	Premier League	T20, 2 x T19; 3 x T20; T20, T17, D18
24 May 2010	(England) James Wade	Premier League	3 x T20; 3 x T20; T20, T19, D12
16 February 2012	(England) Kevin Painter	Premier League	3 x T20; T20, 2 x T19; T20, T17, D18
23 July 2014	(England) Michael Smith	World Matchplay	3 x T20; 2 x T20, T19; 2 x T20, D12
22 August 2015	(Scotland) Peter Wright	Sydney Darts Masters	3 x T20; 3 x T20; T20, T19, D12

== Notes ==
=== References ===
Sporting positions
Preceded by Rod Harrington; Rod Harrington; Alan Warriner; Alan Warriner; John Part; Colin Lloyd; Colin Lloyd; Raymond van Barneveld	PDC World Number One; August 1996 – September 1996; 29 July 2000 – 24 September 2000; 5 January 2002 – February 2002; May 2002 – 4 January 2003; July 2003 – February 2005; 11 June 2006 – 18 June 2006; 1 January 2007 – 1 January 2008; 8 June 2008 – 1 January 2014	Succeeded by Alan Warriner; Peter Manley; Alan Warriner; John Part; Colin Lloyd; Colin Lloyd; Raymond van Barneveld; Michael van Gerwen
Records
Preceded by Eric Bristow; Darryl Fitton	World record highest televised average 5 December 1991 – 9 May 2005; 7 June 2008 – 25 February 2016	Succeeded by Darryl Fitton; Michael van Gerwen
Awards
Preceded by New creation James Wade	PDC Player of the Year; 2006; 2008, 2009, 2010, 2011, 2012	Succeeded by James Wade; Michael van Gerwen
