= 2008 Premier League Darts =

Darts competition

2008 Whyte & Mackay Premier League Darts

Tournament information
- Dates: 31 January–26 May 2008

Champion(s)
- Phil Taylor

The 2008 Whyte & Mackay Premier League was a darts tournament organised by the Professional Darts Corporation. The prize money was increased by £75,000 compared to 2007. The overall fund was £340,000 with the eventual winner taking home £100,000.

Phil Taylor continued his dominance of this tournament by taking the title for the fourth year in a row despite losing for the first time in 44 matches, losing the opening game 8–6 to newcomer James Wade and going on to lose twice more in his first four matches. Taylor beat Wade 16–8 in the final.

Sky Sports secured television coverage of the event until 2010, and Whyte & Mackay sponsored the tournament for the same duration – taking over from Holsten who sponsored the event in 2006 and 2007.

== Qualifiers ==
The World Grand Prix in October 2007 was the cut-off point for automatic qualification for the event. The top six players in the World Rankings after the tournament received an automatic place in the Premier League. The qualifiers were thus:

- (England) Phil Taylor
- (Netherlands) Raymond van Barneveld
- (England) James Wade
- (England) Terry Jenkins
- (England) Peter Manley
- (England) Adrian Lewis
- (Canada) John Part (PDC wildcard)
- (England) Wayne Mardle (Sky Sports wildcard)

== Venues ==
Fifteen venues were used for the 2008 Premier League, including a first trip to Northern Ireland for a night in Belfast.

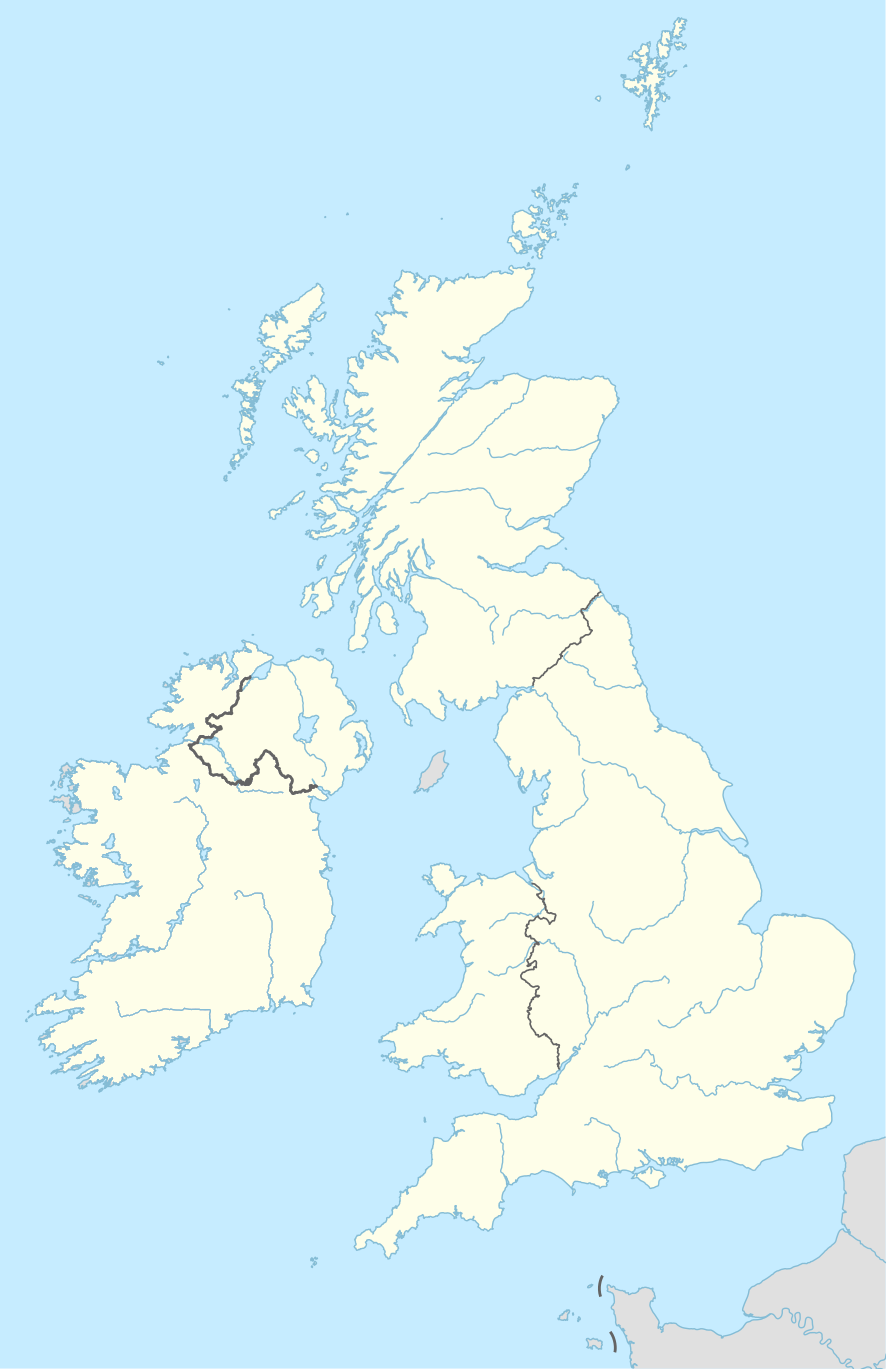
Locations of the 2008 Premier League venues in the United Kingdom.

(Scotland) Glasgow	(England) Plymouth	(England) Manchester	(England) Coventry	(England) Bournemouth
SECC; 31 January	Plymouth Pavilions; 7 February	MEN Arena; 14 February	Ricoh Arena; 21 February	Bournemouth International Centre; 28 February
(England) Nottingham	(England) Sheffield	(England) Brighton	(England) Birmingham	(Scotland) Aberdeen
Trent FM Arena; 6 March	Sheffield Arena; 13 March	Brighton Centre; 20 March	National Indoor Arena; 27 March	AECC; 3 April
(England) Liverpool	(England) London	(Northern Ireland) Belfast	(England) Newcastle	(Wales) Cardiff
Echo Arena Liverpool; 10 April	Wembley Arena; 17 April	Odyssey Arena; 24 April	Metro Radio Arena; 1 May	Cardiff International Arena; 26 May

== Prize money ==
The prize fund increases for 2008 – with the top prize of £100,000 matching the amount that the 2008 PDC World Champion received. The guaranteed prize for reaching the Premier League is now £20,000.

Stage	Prize money
Winner	£100,000
Runner-up	£50,000
Semi-finalists (x2)	£40,000
5th place	£27,500
6th place	£25,000
7th place	£22,500
8th place	£20,000
High Checkout (per night)	£1,000
Total	£340,000

== Results ==
=== League stage ===
==== 31 January – week 1 ====
(Scotland) SECC, Glasgow

Player	Legs	Player
Raymond van Barneveld (Netherlands); 91.24	8 – 4	(England) Wayne Mardle; 90.91
Adrian Lewis (England); 87.97	8 – 5	(England) Terry Jenkins; 86.76
Peter Manley (England); 90.90	7 – 7	(Canada) John Part; 94.33
Phil Taylor (England); 93.76	6 – 8	(England) James Wade; 94.77
High Checkout: John Part 157

==== 7 February – week 2 ====
(England) Plymouth Pavilions, Plymouth

Player	Legs	Player
John Part (Canada); 91.81	4 – 8	(Netherlands) Raymond van Barneveld; 94.34
James Wade (England); 88.29	8 – 6	(England) Terry Jenkins; 89.34
Phil Taylor (England); 95.71	8 – 4	(England) Adrian Lewis; 96.79
Peter Manley (England); 94.47	7 – 7	(England) Wayne Mardle; 96.12
High Checkout: Terry Jenkins 104

==== 14 February – week 3 ====
(England) MEN Arena, Manchester

Player	Legs	Player
Terry Jenkins (England); 96.49	8 – 5	(England) Phil Taylor; 96.76
Raymond van Barneveld (Netherlands); 96.58	8 – 4	(England) Peter Manley; 91.56
Wayne Mardle (England); 91.35	6 – 8	(Canada) John Part; 95.90
Adrian Lewis (England); 93.81	7 – 7	(England) James Wade; 92.09
High Checkout: Adrian Lewis 146

==== 21 February – Week 4 ====
(England) Ricoh Arena, Coventry

Player	Legs	Player
John Part (Canada); 88.57	4 – 8	(England) James Wade; 96.51
Wayne Mardle (England); 84.92	6 – 8	(England) Adrian Lewis; 91.70
Peter Manley (England); 102.02	8 – 3	(England) Phil Taylor; 94.96
Terry Jenkins (England); 92.51	8 – 5	(Netherlands) Raymond van Barneveld; 91.88
High Checkout: Terry Jenkins 156

==== 28 February – Week 5 ====
(England) Bournemouth International Centre, Bournemouth

Player	Legs	Player
Adrian Lewis (England); 84.17	7 – 7	(England) Peter Manley; 85.70
Phil Taylor (England); 96.97	8 – 0	(England) Wayne Mardle; 88.43
James Wade (England); 89.54	6 – 8	(Netherlands) Raymond van Barneveld; 91.09
John Part (Canada); 95.66	2 – 8	(England) Terry Jenkins; 98.28
High Checkout: Peter Manley 160

==== 6 March – Week 6 ====
(England) Trent FM Arena, Nottingham

Player	Legs	Player
Wayne Mardle (England); 91.92	7 – 7	(England) James Wade; 92.61
Adrian Lewis (England); 85.58	6 – 8	(Canada) John Part; 85.20
Terry Jenkins (England); 93.28	7 – 7	(England) Peter Manley; 87.75
Raymond van Barneveld (Netherlands); 94.10	3 – 8	(England) Phil Taylor; 111.14
High Checkout: Phil Taylor 167

==== 13 March – Week 7 ====
(England) Sheffield Arena, Sheffield

Player	Legs	Player
Wayne Mardle (England); 88.68	8 – 5	(England) Terry Jenkins; 91.08
James Wade (England); 97.60	8 – 5	(England) Peter Manley; 91.53
Raymond van Barneveld (Netherlands); 93.42	8 – 2	(England) Adrian Lewis; 87.64
Phil Taylor (England); 107.39	8 – 3	(Canada) John Part; 102.74
High Checkout: Phil Taylor 164

==== 20 March – Week 8 ====
(England) Brighton Centre, Brighton

Player	Legs	Player
Terry Jenkins (England); 96.43	3 – 8	(England) Adrian Lewis; 101.81
Wayne Mardle (England); 94.88	8 – 5	(Netherlands) Raymond van Barneveld; 94.78
John Part (Canada); 96.68	8 – 5	(England) Peter Manley; 90.88
James Wade (England); 102.13	4 – 8	(England) Phil Taylor; 104.45
High Checkout: Phil Taylor 164

==== 27 March – Week 9 ====
(England) National Indoor Arena, Birmingham

Player	Legs	Player
Terry Jenkins (England); 88.63	4 – 8	(England) James Wade; 101.77
Raymond van Barneveld (Netherlands); 93.38	8 – 6	(Canada) John Part; 89.33
Wayne Mardle (England); 89.30	8 – 5	(England) Peter Manley; 90.90
Phil Taylor (England); 101.41	7 – 7	(England) Terry Jenkins; 92.46
High Checkout: Wayne Mardle 114

† = Terry Jenkins replaced Adrian Lewis on 27 March show against Phil Taylor because Lewis was too ill to play. The next week, Lewis played his match against Taylor and James Wade, giving Jenkins the night off.

==== 3 April – week 10 ====
(Scotland) AECC, Aberdeen

Player	Legs	Player
Adrian Lewis (England); 89.11	3 – 8	(England) Phil Taylor; 104.38
Peter Manley (England); 88.99	8 – 6	(Netherlands) Raymond van Barneveld; 93.40
John Part (Canada); 94.89	5 – 8	(England) Wayne Mardle; 98.35
James Wade (England); 103.15	8 – 1	(England) Adrian Lewis; 76.09
High Checkout: James Wade 121

==== 10 April – week 11 ====
(England) Echo Arena, Liverpool

Player	Legs	Player
James Wade (England); 101.45	8 – 5	(England) Wayne Mardle; 97.57
John Part (Canada); 92.33	2 – 8	(England) Adrian Lewis; 98.96
Peter Manley (England); 102.96	8 – 5	(England) Terry Jenkins; 98.74
Phil Taylor (England); 103.02	8 – 2	(Netherlands) Raymond van Barneveld; 94.96
High Checkout: Adrian Lewis 170

==== 17 April – week 12 ====
(England) Wembley Arena, London

Player	Legs	Player
Terry Jenkins (England); 83.84	7 – 7	(England) Wayne Mardle; 85.61
Peter Manley (England); 89.67	6 – 8	(England) James Wade; 92.61
Adrian Lewis (England); 96.25	4 – 8	(Netherlands) Raymond van Barneveld; 92.59
John Part (Canada); 103.66	3 – 8	(England) Phil Taylor; 111.74
High Checkout: Phil Taylor 139

==== 24 April – week 13 ====
(Northern Ireland) Odyssey Arena, Belfast

Player	Legs	Player
Peter Manley (England); 89.79	7 – 7	(England) Adrian Lewis; 91.04
Wayne Mardle (England); 85.54	1 – 8	(England) Phil Taylor; 107.21
Raymond van Barneveld (Netherlands); 98.81	8 – 6	(England) James Wade; 93.86
Terry Jenkins (England); 93.13	5 – 8	(Canada) John Part; 92.50
High Checkout: Terry Jenkins 161

==== 1 May – week 14 ====
(England) Metro Radio Arena, Newcastle upon Tyne

Player	Legs	Player
James Wade (England); 95.32	8 – 5	(Canada) John Part; 97.68
Raymond van Barneveld (Netherlands); 93.51	8 – 1	(England) Terry Jenkins; 81.16
Adrian Lewis (England); 92.23	7 – 7	(England) Wayne Mardle; 87.75
Phil Taylor (England); 107.21	8 – 1	(England) Peter Manley; 101.59
High Checkout: Phil Taylor 167

=== Play-offs – 26 May ===
(Wales) Cardiff International Arena, Cardiff

	Score	
Semi-finals (best of 21 legs)
Phil Taylor (England); 112.68	11 – 1	(England) Adrian Lewis; 97.33
James Wade (England); 89.62	11 – 8	(Netherlands) Raymond van Barneveld; 90.65
Final (best of 31 legs)
Phil Taylor (England); 108.36	16 – 8	(England) James Wade; 100.14
High Checkout: n/a

== Table and Streaks ==
=== Table ===
Pos	Name	Pld	W	D	L	Pts	LF	LA	+/-	LWAT	100+	140+	180s	A	HC
1	(England) Phil Taylor W	14	10	1	3	21	101	55	+46	31	208	133	46	102.58	167
2	(England) James Wade RU	14	9	2	3	20	102	76	+26	40	255	145	42	95.84	161
3	(Netherlands) Raymond van Barneveld	14	9	0	5	18	93	77	+16	37	213	111	35	93.77	157
4	(England) Adrian Lewis	14	4	4	6	12	80	92	−12	30	197	102	38	90.94	170
5	(England) Wayne Mardle	14	4	4	6	12	82	96	−14	31	218	139	32	90.76	123
6	(England) Peter Manley	14	3	5	6	11	85	97	−12	30	288	147	21	92.84	160
7	(England) Terry Jenkins	14	3	3	8	9	79	97	−18	23	269	109	28	91.72	161
8	(Canada) John Part	14	4	1	9	9	73	101	−28	28	190	116	31	94.38	157

NB: LWAT = Legs Won Against Throw. Players separated by +/- leg difference if tied.

=== Streaks ===
Player	Week																Play-offs	
Player	1	2	3	4	5	6	7	8	9		10		11	12	13	14	SF	F
(England) Phil Taylor	L	W	L	L	W	W	W	W	D		W		W	W	W	W	W	W
(England) James Wade	W	W	D	W	L	D	W	L	W		W		W	W	L	W	W	L
(Netherlands) Raymond van Barneveld	W	W	W	L	W	L	W	L	W		L		L	W	W	W	L	—N/a
(England) Adrian Lewis	W	L	D	W	D	L	L	W	—N/a		L	L	W	L	D	D	L	—N/a
(England) Wayne Mardle	L	D	L	L	L	D	W	W	W		W		L	D	L	D	—N/a	
(England) Peter Manley	D	D	L	W	D	D	L	L	L		W		W	L	D	L	—N/a	
(England) Terry Jenkins	L	L	W	W	W	D	L	L	L	D	—N/a		L	D	L	L	—N/a	
(Canada) John Part	D	L	W	L	L	W	L	W	L		L		L	L	W	L	—N/a	

NB: W = Won D = Drawn L = Lost N/A = Did Not Play

== Player statistics ==
The following statistics are for the league stage only. Playoffs are not included.

=== Phil Taylor ===
- Longest unbeaten run: 10
- Most consecutive wins: 5
- Most consecutive draws: 1
- Most consecutive losses: 2
- Longest without a win: 2
- Biggest victory: 8-0 (v. Wayne Mardle)
- Biggest defeat: 3-8 (v. Peter Manley)

=== James Wade ===
- Longest unbeaten run: 4
- Most consecutive wins: 4
- Most consecutive draws: 1
- Most consecutive losses: 1
- Longest without a win: 2
- Biggest victory: 8-1 (v. Adrian Lewis)
- Biggest defeat: 4-8 (v. Phil Taylor)

=== Raymond van Barneveld ===
- Longest unbeaten run: 3
- Most consecutive wins: 3
- Most consecutive draws: 0
- Most consecutive losses: 2
- Longest without a win: 2
- Biggest victory: 8-1 (v. Terry Jenkins)
- Biggest defeat: 2-8 (v. Phil Taylor)

=== Adrian Lewis ===
- Longest unbeaten run: 3
- Most consecutive wins: 1
- Most consecutive draws: 2
- Most consecutive losses: 2
- Longest without a win: 3
- Biggest victory: 8-2 (v. John Part)
- Biggest defeat: 1-8 (v. James Wade)

=== Wayne Mardle ===
- Longest unbeaten run: 5
- Most consecutive wins: 4
- Most consecutive draws: 1
- Most consecutive losses: 3
- Longest without a win: 6
- Biggest victory: 8-5 (v. Terry Jenkins, v. Raymond van Barneveld, v. Peter Manley and v. John Part)
- Biggest defeat: 0-8 (v. Phil Taylor)

=== Peter Manley ===
- Longest unbeaten run: 3
- Most consecutive wins: 2
- Most consecutive draws: 2
- Most consecutive losses: 3
- Longest without a win: 5
- Biggest victory: 8-3 (v. Phil Taylor)
- Biggest defeat: 1-8 (v. Phil Taylor)

=== Terry Jenkins ===
- Longest unbeaten run: 4
- Most consecutive wins: 3
- Most consecutive draws: 1
- Most consecutive losses: 3
- Longest without a win: 9
- Biggest victory: 8-2 (v. John Part)
- Biggest defeat: 1-8 (v. Raymond van Barneveld)

=== John Part ===
- Longest unbeaten run: 1
- Most consecutive wins: 1
- Most consecutive draws: 1
- Most consecutive losses: 4
- Longest without a win: 4
- Biggest victory: 8-5 (v. Peter Manley and v. Terry Jenkins)
- Biggest defeat: 2-8 (v. Terry Jenkins and v. Adrian Lewis)
