= 2002 World Matchplay =

Professional darts tournament

2002 Stan James World Matchplay

Tournament information
- Dates: 28 July–3 August 2002
- Venue: Winter Gardens
- Location: Blackpool
- Country: England
- Organisation(s): PDC
- Format: Legs
- Prize fund: £75,500
- Winner's share: £15,000
- Nine-dart finish: Phil Taylor (ENG)
- High checkout: 170 Keith Deller (ENG)

Champion(s)
- Phil Taylor (ENG)

The 2002 Stan James World Matchplay was a professional darts tournament held from 28 July to 3 August 2002 at the Empress Ballroom in the Winter Gardens of Blackpool. It was the ninth staging of the competition since the 1994 edition and the 18th of 35 Professional Darts Corporation (PDC) tournaments in the 2002 season. The tournament was broadcast on Sky Sports and was sponsored by the betting company Stan James.

The tournament's defending champion Phil Taylor defeated John Part by 18 legs to 16 in the final, winning his third consecutive World Matchplay title and his fifth overall since his first in the 1995 event. He defeated qualifier Shayne Burgess in round one, Kevin Painter in round two Chris Mason in the quarter-finals and John Lowe in the semi-finals en route to the final. Taylor made a nine-dart finish in the fifth leg of his quarter-final match against Mason, the first time the achievement had been broadcast live in the United Kingdom. Keith Deller achieved the competition's highest checkout, a 170, in his second-round match against Alan Warriner.

== Tournament summary ==
=== Background ===
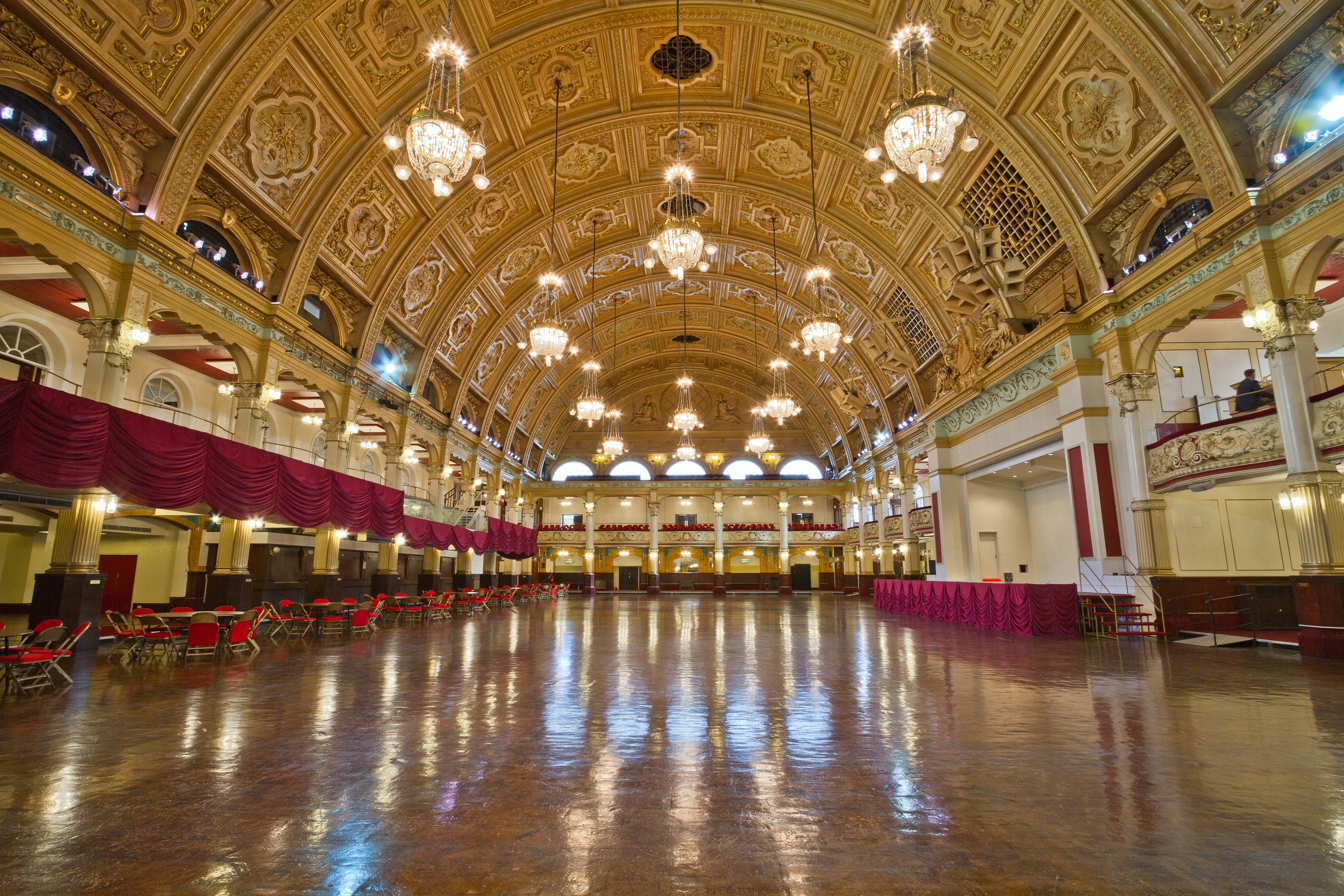
The Empress Ballroom, where the tournament was held.

Tommy Cox, the tournament director and co-founder of the Professional Darts Corporation (PDC), conceived the idea of staging a darts tournament in the North West England seaside resort of Blackpool in the early 1990s. The World Matchplay was first held in 1994 and is the second most prestigious competition in the PDC in terms of prize money behind the World Championship. The 2002 tournament was held between 28 July to 3 August in Blackpool, England, and was the 18th of 35 PDC-sanctioned events that year. It was the ninth edition of the tournament and featured a 32-player main draw that was played at the Empress Ballroom in the Winter Gardens.

A total of 28 players automatically qualified for the main draw according to their final position from 1 to 28 in the PDC rankings with 16 seeds. The tournament's defending champion Phil Taylor was seeded first and Alan Warriner was the second seed. The remaining four places were decided by a two-stage play-off tournament contested by members of the Professional Dart Players Association at the Cardiff International Arena in Cardiff, Wales, on 20 July. Shayne Burgess, Mark Holden, Mark Walsh and Paul Whitworth were the four players who progressed from qualifying to the main draw. The maximum number of legs played in a match increased from 19 in the first round to 25 in the second and 31 and 33 in the quarter and semi-finals respectively, leading up to the final which was played as best-of-35 legs. Sponsored by the betting company Stan James, it had a total prize fund of £75,500, and the host broadcaster was Sky Sports.

=== Round 1 ===
The draw for the first round of the championship was conducted on Sky Sports News by Cox and Sid Waddell on 19 June. The first round of the competition, in which 32 players participated, took place from 28 to 30 July. Steve Brown defeated the ninth seed Dennis Smith 10–7. Brown led 5–3 with a 137 checkout before Smith took the next two legs to tie at 5–5. Brown then reestablished a two-leg lead and won the match on the double 20 outer ring. Kevin Painter, the 16th seed, averaged 53.85 points per dart to win 10–4 over former world champion Dennis Priestley. Taylor achieved a three-dart average of 100.74 and a checkout of 161 in whitewashing qualifier Burgess 10–0; he attempted to complete a nine-dart finish in leg seven before he missed the triple 20 inner ring on his seventh throw.

A 64 checkout gave Holden the opening leg of his match against the Las Vegas Desert Classic runner-up Ronnie Baxter, who won ten legs in a row to win by 10–1 with finishes of 121 and 70. Fourth seed Denis Ovens was untroubled in a game with Whitworth and made a checkout of 121 in leg five en route to a 10–4 win. 12th seed Jamie Harvey emerged a 10–5 winner over Andy Jenkins as both missed their targets. Harvey said afterwards he required a victory at the tournament due to him being drawn to play Taylor in the previous two years. John Lowe made a three-dart average of 90.93, a checkout ratio of 30.31 and a checkout of 114 to defeat Alex Roy 10–2. A 52 finish and a 89.60 three-dart average allowed Chris Mason to win 10–1 over Richie Burnett, the 2001 World Matchplay runner-up. Mason failed to achieve a nine-dart finish because he missed the triple 19 inner ring at his eighth throw. Second seed Warriner won 11–9 over Les Fitton. Both players took the game to 9–9 and Warriner won by two legs over Fitton on a tie-break.

Number 20 seed Keith Deller, who had lost in the first round of the previous three World Matchplays, came from 4–1 and 6–3 behind the two-time tournament winner Rod Harrington for a 10–8 victory with finishes of 116, 32 and 76 after the latter had a series of bounce outs that affected his flow. Another tie-break was required in a match between Bob Anderson and seed eight Peter Manley in which the former won 18–16; both competitors compiled high scores with checkouts of 111 and 116. World number eight Colin Lloyd came from 4–7 behind Mick Manning to claim six legs in succession and win 10–7, saying afterwards, "I started thinking am I going to hit the double? And saying to myself 'keep going the way you are and the doubles will come'" Dave Askew won 10–4 over Peter Evison. Both players tied at 2–2 before Askew took a 4–3 lead. Askew won the following six legs and Evison the thirteenth. Askew took victory on the double eight outer ring and had an average finish of 93.29.

John Part, the Ireland Open Class champion, had a three-dart average of 84.92 in whitewashing the error-prone Walsh 10–0. Part said he felt slightly awkward for Walsh not performing and that "it ended more or less like a practice match." Cliff Lazarenko averaged 98.67 in defeating Steve Beaton 10–8. The match saw Lazarenko lead 5–1 before Beaton responded to bring it to 8–9; the former finished on the double 16 outer ring to win. The final first round match was played between the world number six Roland Scholten and Paul Williams. Scholten compiled high scores as the game went to 4–4 and later 8–8 before winning two more legs for a 10–8 victory on the double 20 outer ring.

=== Round 2 ===
The second round consisted of best-of-25 legs between 30 and 31 July. Taylor was the first player to progress to the quarter-finals with a 13–6 victory over Painter. He led Painter 3–2 and later 6–4. before checkouts of 68, 127 and 167 gave him the win; he missed compiling a 170 checkout. Mason won 13–6 over Brown; he had an average of 97 in the first six legs, which he won. Brown subsequently returned to contention before Mason won the match. The next second-round match saw Baxter beat Harvey 13–7. Baxter threw accurately enough to claim the opening three legs until Harvey mounted a short comeback. Harvey had a three-dart average of 85 before he was unable to complete a 140 checkout and Baxter returned to a three-leg lead at 7–3. Harvey took a further four legs in the match before Baxter claimed victory. Lowe beat Ovens 14–12. The game was closely contested until the 14th leg, when Ovens hit the double one ring to go 8–6 in front. It went to 10–11 and then 11–11 before Lowe took the win.

Lloyd earned a 13–5 victory against Scholten. Both players shared the first two legs before Lloyd claimed seven sets in a row to lead Scholten 9–2. Scholten then lowered his deficit to 9–3 until Lloyd had finishes in the double five and fifteen outer rings to earn a spot in the quarter-final. Deller emerged from 5–2 behind Warriner to level the score at 6–6 and then 7–7. As Warriner drew clear, Deller made the tournament's highest checkout of 170 in the 18th leg and then finished in the double one, five and sixteen rings to win by 13–11; Deller's form allowed him to hit 13 out of 30 targets. Anderson defeated Askew 13–9 after he overcame a late match challenge from his opponent. He led 8–2 when Askew took 7 of the next 11 legs before Anderson won the match by hitting the double 20 outer ring in the 22nd leg. The last second-round match was contested by Part and Lazarenko. Both players shared the first 18 legs with neither taking a clear advantage. At 9–9, Part clinched the 19th leg and made a checkout of 117 to lead 11–9. He then won two more legs for a 13–11 victory.

=== Quarter-finals ===
The four quarter-finals entailed best-of-31 legs on 1 August. Lloyd defeated Deller 16–6 in the first match. Level at 2–2 after checkouts of 138 and 60, Lloyd won two legs in a row before Deller took leg seven after Lloyd was unable to complete a checkout of 130. Lloyd then won four consecutive legs, and responded each time Deller won a leg to claim a 16–6 victory and a berth in the semi-final. Part beat Anderson 16–5 for the second semi-final spot. He won 11 legs in succession and 15 of the last 16 to set up a semi-final meeting with Lloyd.

Taylor made the first nine-dart finish (two maximums and completing a 141 checkout by hitting the triple 20 and 19 inner rings and the double 12 outer ring) to be broadcast live in the United Kingdom in the fifth leg of his 16–7 victory over Mason and won £100,000 for doing so. (Note: Tournament broadcasters Sky Sports erroneously stated that Taylor's nine-dart finish was the first in history to be televised live. Shaun Greatbatch had made a nine-dart finish earlier in 2002 live on Dutch television in the Dutch Open.) He had a three-dart average of 112.17 with checkouts of 120, 126, 167, 87 and 106 for victory. Of the achievement, Taylor said: "I was a bit tearful at the end but I had to dig in.... Once I'd done the nine-darter it was a bit off-putting to then win the match. When everyone's waving betting slips at you, it takes you a few legs to think that this fella could knock me out of the competition if I'm not careful." Lowe took the last semi-final berth with a 16–13 win over Baxter. The players split the first two legs before Baxter won the third. Lowe then won three legs in a row until Baxter tied at 5–5. The score went to 8–7 and then 11–11 until Lowe claimed another three legs to be within two of victory. Baxter claimed two more legs until Lowe took two in succession to win.

=== Semi-finals ===
Both of the semi-finals were contested as best-of-33 legs on 2 August. Part was the first player to reach the final when he defeated Lloyd 17–12. Lloyd won the first two legs with a checkout of 76 and a finish on the double 14 outer ring. Part used Lloyd's inability to convert his throws to claim the next four legs. The game was closely contested with neither player going more than two legs ahead after 18 legs. After a short interval, Part moved into a 15–10 lead and won a 16th leg with a checkout of 122. Lloyd delayed victory by claiming the 27th leg and the 28th saw Part win the match by finishing on the double eight outer ring. Part said after the match that he had not produced his best performance of the competition, "I didn't have my best game on hand, but it was a great fight. Colin and I gave it our best."

The other semi-final was between Lowe and Taylor. The players split the opening two legs before Taylor won two in a row from checkouts of 106 and 64. Both players had an equal amount of competitiveness and came back several times during the match with checkouts over 100 until Taylor won 17–15 by completing a checkout on the double 16 outer ring in the 32nd leg. Taylor praised Lowe's play and commented on the final: "I can relax now and enjoy it. John's got to play well against me. Every time I've played him I've given him a good hiding but tomorrow's a different story. John wants to beat me badly and it's going to be a good final." Mel Webb of The Times wrote that the match had seen Taylor taken further than he had been in a major darts competition since his semi-final tie with Eric Bristow at the 1997 WDC World Darts Championship went to nine sets.

=== Final ===
The final between Taylor and Part on 3 August was played to the best-of-35 legs. The pair shared the first two legs before Taylor took legs three and four and added the fifth after the two had missed chances to secure it earlier on. Part replied by compiling checkouts of 72 and 81 to remain in close contention, and took the lead by winning leg eleven. From the 12th to 18th legs, both players levelled the scoreline until Taylor ended the deadlock. Part later achieved a checkout of 104 in the twentieth leg as Taylor grew more frustrated by the 25th leg. Taylor made a 161 checkout to which Part replied with checkouts of 160 and 87 to regain an advantage over the former. The match was tied once again until Part returned to the lead with a 61 checkout on the 31st leg. Taylor claimed the 33rd and 34th legs to win the match 18–16 and the tournament.

It was Taylor's third consecutive World Matchplay title and his fifth overall since first winning it at the 1995 edition. He won £15,000 for winning the competition and £100,000 for his nine-dart finish, earning him a cumulative total of £115,000. Taylor commented on Part's form during the game: "He really pushed me. Every time I missed, he would finish his shots. At 16-all, I thought this is a best of three now and I need to do the business. Adrenaline and the will to win pulled me through." He called it "one of the hardest tournaments I’ve ever played in" because he had underestimated players whom he perceived as sub-par and called them "vultures", adding: "They are getting fed up with losing, and you can tell by the way they are playing against me."

== Prize fund ==
The breakdown of prize money for 2002 is shown below.

- Winner: £15,000
- Runner-up: £7,500
- Semi-finalists (×2): £4,500
- Quarter-finalists (×4): £2,500
- Last 16 (×8): £1,750
- Last 32 (×16): £1,250
- 9-Dart checkout: £100,000
- Highest checkout: £0
- Total: £75,500

== Main draw ==
Numbers given to the left of players' names show the seedings for the top 16 players in the tournament. The four qualifiers are indicated by a (Q). The figures in brackets to the right of a competitor's name state their three-dart averages in a match. Players in bold denote match winners.

**First round** (best of 19 legs); 28–30 July
1	**Phil Taylor** (ENG)100.86	**10**
Q	Shayne Burgess (ENG) 87.72	0
16	**Kevin Painter** (ENG) 94.98	**10**
Dennis Priestley (ENG) 91.38	4
8	Richie Burnett (WAL) 78.03	1
**Chris Mason** (ENG) 89.01	**10**
9	Dennis Smith (ENG) 89.02	7
**Steve Brown** (USA) 90.67	**10**
5	**Ronnie Baxter** (ENG) 92.01	**10**
Q	Mark Holden (ENG) 75.68	1
12	**Jamie Harvey** (SCO) 82.74	**10**
Andy Jenkins (ENG) 72.49	5
4	**Denis Ovens** (ENG) 85.89	**10**
Q	Paul Whitworth (ENG) 82.67	3
13	**John Lowe** (ENG) 90.93	**10**
Alex Roy (ENG) 82.38	2
2	**Alan Warriner** (ENG) 79.67	**11**
Les Fitton (ENG) 79.25	9
15	Rod Harrington (ENG) 76.95	8
**Keith Deller** (ENG) 76.23	**10**
7	**Colin Lloyd** (ENG) 85.32	**10**
Mick Manning (ENG) 85.87	7
10	**Roland Scholten** (NED) 92.85	**10**
Paul Williams (ENG) 89.47	8
6	Peter Manley (ENG) 85.74	15
**Bob Anderson** (ENG) 87.52	**17**
11	**Dave Askew** (ENG) 93.29	**10**
Peter Evison (ENG) 85.69	4
3	**John Part** (CAN) 84.90	**10**
Q	Mark Walsh (ENG) 64.59	0
14	Steve Beaton (ENG) 82.23	8
**Cliff Lazarenko** (ENG) 83.71	**10**

**Second round** (best of 25 legs); 30–31 July
1	(England) **Phil Taylor** 104.01	**13**
16	(England) Kevin Painter 98.40	6
(England) **Chris Mason** 98.71	**13**
(United States) Steve Brown 88.56	6
5	(England) **Ronnie Baxter** 94.41	**13**
12	(Scotland) Jamie Harvey 84.79	7
4	(England) Denis Ovens 91.53	12
13	(England) **John Lowe** 93.92	**14**
2	(England) Alan Warriner 84.34	11
(England) **Keith Deller** 83.65	**13**
7	(England) **Colin Lloyd** 84.15	**13**
10	(Netherlands) Roland Scholten 78.50	5
(England) **Bob Anderson** 81.70	**13**
11	(England) Dave Askew 78.12	9
3	(Canada) **John Part** 96.15	**13**
(England) Cliff Lazarenko 88.68	9

**Quarter-finals** (best of 31 legs); 1 August
1	(England) **Phil Taylor** 112.17	**16**
(England) Chris Mason 98.79	7
5	(England) Ronnie Baxter 89.61	13
13	(England) **John Lowe** 92.52	**16**
(England) Keith Deller 76.89	6
7	(England) **Colin Lloyd** 82.74	**16**
(England) Bob Anderson 88.89	5
3	(Canada) **John Part** 95.19	**16**

**Semi-finals** (best of 33 legs); 2 August
1	(England) **Phil Taylor** 95.91	**17**
13	(England) John Lowe 90.48	15
7	(England) Colin Lloyd 88.95	12
3	(Canada) **John Part** 91.32	**17**

**Final** (best of 35 legs); 3 August
1	(England) **Phil Taylor** 98.76	**18**
3	(Canada) John Part 94.14	16
