= 2000 World Matchplay =

2000 Stan James World Matchplay

Tournament information
- Dates: 23–29 July 2000
- Venue: Winter Gardens
- Location: Blackpool
- Country: England
- Organisation(s): PDC
- Format: Legs
- Prize fund: £58,000
- Winner's share: £14,000
- High checkout: 170 (England) Alex Roy (United States) Steve Brown

Champion(s)
- (England) Phil Taylor

The 2000 Stan James World Matchplay was a darts tournament held in the Empress Ballroom at the Winter Gardens, Blackpool. This was the first World Matchplay tournament to be sponsored by UK bookmaker Stan James.

The tournament ran from 23 to 29 July 2000, and was won by Phil Taylor.

Paul Lim Had to pull out of this tournament due to visa issues his place was taken by Alex Roy, The opening night of action was not televised by Sky Sports

== Prize money ==
The prize fund was £58,000.

Position (no. of players)		Prize money (Total: £58,000)
Winner	(1)	£14,000
Runner-Up	(1)	£7,000
Semi-finalists	(2)	£3,500
Quarter-finalists	(4)	£2,000
Second round	(8)	£1,250
First round	(16)	£750

== Seeds ==
There were eight seeds for the competition.

1. (England) Phil Taylor
2. (England) Peter Manley
3. (England) Shayne Burgess
4. (England) Rod Harrington
5. (England) Dennis Priestley
6. (England) Alan Warriner
7. (Canada) John Part
8. (England) Keith Deller

== Results ==
Players in bold denote match winners.

**First round** (best of 19 legs); 23–25 July
1	(England) **Phil Taylor** 101.01	**10**
(Scotland) Jamie Harvey 88.71	2
(England) Colin Lloyd 87.96	7
(England) **Nigel Justice** 84.33	**10**
8	(England) Keith Deller 80.46	7
(England) **John Lowe** 81.24	**10**
(England) **Chris Mason** 84.39	**10**
(United States) Gary Mawson 76.86	4
5	(England) **Dennis Priestley** 90.69	**10**
(England) Steve Raw 80.22	1
(Wales) **Richie Burnett** 86.67	**10**
(England) Les Fitton 83.22	7
4	(England) **Rod Harrington** 87.65	**11**
(Netherlands) Roland Scholten 84.65	9
(England) **Bob Anderson** 86.61	**10**
(England) Graeme Stoddart 75.72	1
2	(England) Peter Manley 90.84	6
(England) **Ronnie Baxter** 94.65	**10**
(England) Dave Askew 83.58	3
(England) **Denis Ovens** 90.35	**10**
7	(Canada) John Part 93.57	8
(England) **Dennis Smith** 86.52	**10**
(United States) **Steve Brown** 76.78	**10**
(England) John Ferrell 67.89	2
6	(England) **Alan Warriner** 92.07	**10**
(England) Reg Harding 83.67	8
(England) **Mick Manning** 83.76	**15**
(England) Andy Jenkins 87.90	13
3	(England) **Shayne Burgess** 94.19	**15**
(England) Martin Adams 92.09	13
(England) **Alex Roy** 85.71	**10**
(England) Peter Evison 83.94	4

**Second round** (best of 25 legs); 25–26 July
1	(England) **Phil Taylor** 96.51	**13**
(England) Nigel Justice 79.36	3
(England) **John Lowe** 89.81	**13**
(England) Chris Mason 96.82	11
5	(England) Dennis Priestley 95.43	12
(Wales) **Richie Burnett** 93.36	**14**
4	(England) **Rod Harrington** 92.83	**13**
(England) Bob Anderson 90.85	7
(England) **Ronnie Baxter** 94.26	**13**
(England) Denis Ovens 88.08	3
(England) Dennis Smith 87.10	11
(United States) **Steve Brown** 89.64	**13**
6	(England) **Alan Warriner** 93.39	**13**
(England) Mick Manning 89.82	8
3	(England) Shayne Burgess 89.37	16
(England) **Alex Roy** 90.30	**18**

**Quarter-finals** (best of 31 legs); 27 July
1	(England) **Phil Taylor** 95.91	**16**
(England) John Lowe 83.53	4
(Wales) **Richie Burnett** 92.40	**16**
4	(England) Rod Harrington 94.38	13
(England) **Ronnie Baxter** 91.65	**16**
(United States) Steve Brown 86.46	5
6	(England) **Alan Warriner** 88.70	**16**
(England) Alex Roy 80.58	10

**Semi-finals** (best of 33 legs); 28 July
1	(England) **Phil Taylor** 102.15	**17**
(Wales) Richie Burnett 97.08	9
(England) Ronnie Baxter 90.45	7
6	(England) **Alan Warriner** 97.86	**17**

**Final** (best of 35 legs); 29 July
1	(England) **Phil Taylor** 100.32	**18**
6	(England) Alan Warriner 97.14	12
