= 2005 PDC World Darts Championship =

Tournament information
- Dates: 26 December 2004 – 3 January 2005
- Venue: Circus Tavern
- Location: Purfleet
- Country: England
- Organisation(s): PDC
- Format: Sets; Final – best of 13
- Prize fund: £300,000
- Winner's share: £60,000
- High checkout: 170 Kevin Painter

Champion(s)
- Phil Taylor

The 2005 PDC World Darts Championship (known for sponsorship reasons as the 2005 Ladbrokes.com World Darts Championship) was the twelfth edition of the PDC World Darts Championship, and was held at the Circus Tavern, Purfleet taking place between 26 December 2004 and 3 January 2005.

Phil Taylor went on to clinch his 12th World Championship (10 in the PDC, 2 in the BDO) with a 7–4 final victory over Mark Dudbridge.

The tournament format remained the same as the previous year, with a preliminary round featuring eight international players against eight qualifiers from the Professional Dart Players Association (PDPA) qualifying tournament. The winners were then to meet the players ranked between 25 and 32 in the PDC world rankings.

John Lowe, playing in his last and 28th consecutive world championship, suffered a defeat to Canadian John Verwey. The match went to a tie-break 11th leg in the deciding set.

The final between Taylor and Dudbridge looked for a long time as though it would be as close as the previous year's classic between Taylor and Kevin Painter. Dudbridge led by 2 sets to 1, and having fallen 2–3 behind managed to level again. But Taylor then produced a surge to take the next three sets, and the 10th set provided a mere consolation for Dudbridge. Taylor prevailed 7–4 to claim the £60,000 first prize with his 12th title.

== Seeds ==
1. (England) Colin Lloyd
2. (England) Phil Taylor
3. (England) Peter Manley
4. (Canada) John Part
5. (Netherlands) Roland Scholten
6. (England) Ronnie Baxter
7. (England) Kevin Painter
8. (England) Wayne Mardle
9. (England) Alan Warriner
10. (England) Andy Jenkins
11. (England) Dennis Smith
12. (England) Denis Ovens
13. (England) Mark Dudbridge
14. (England) Steve Beaton
15. (England) Dennis Priestley
16. (England) Dave Askew

== Prize money ==
Position (num. of players)		Prize money (Total: £300,000)
Winner	(1)	£60,000
Runner-Up	(1)	£30,000
Semi-finalists	(2)	£15,000
Quarter-finalists	(4)	£9,000
Fourth round losers	(8)	£6,500
Third round losers	(16)	£3,500
Second round losers	(8)	£2,750
First round losers	(8)	£1,750

== Results ==
First round (best of 5 sets); 26 December
(Scotland) Jason Clark 81.44	3
(Japan) Yasuhiko Matsunaga 72.74	0
(China) Tang Jun 72.45	0
(Canada) Gerry Convery 84.54	3
(Canada) John Verwey 83.55	3
(Barbados) Anthony Forde 80.48	2
(United States) Darin Young 82.74	2
(Netherlands) Josephus Schenk 84.89	3
(England) Mark Holden 94.42	3
(England) James Wade 88.14	0
(England) Mark Landers 76.70	3
(Wales) Alan Reynolds 79.51	2
(Australia) Barry Jouannet 82.18	0
(England) Wayne Jones 91.38	3
(England) Mark Thomson 81.56	0
(England) Andy Hamilton 85.87	3

Second round (best of 5 sets); 27 December
(England) Chris Mason 95.51	3
(Scotland) Jason Clark 87.76	1
(England) Wes Newton 81.53	0
(Canada) Gerry Convery 84.06	3
(England) John Lowe 84.91	2
(Canada) John Verwey 82.73	3
(England) Alan Caves 77.37	0
(Netherlands) Josephus Schenk 83.51	3
(England) Simon Whatley 81.93	0
(England) Mark Holden 89.51	3
(England) Peter Evison 77.71	3
(England) Mark Landers 74.89	0
(England) Keith Deller 77.64	1
(England) Wayne Jones 82.30	3
(England) Mick Manning 89.44	0
(England) Andy Hamilton 92.49	3

=== Last 32 ===
Third round (best of 7 sets); 28–30 December
1	(England) Colin Lloyd 89.17	4
(Canada) John Verwey 77.29	1
16	(England) Dave Askew 89.48	3
(England) Chris Mason 92.10	4
8	(England) Wayne Mardle 84.32	4
(England) Mark Walsh 82.02	2
9	(England) Alan Warriner 67.86	1
(England) Paul Williams 78.95	4
5	(Netherlands) Roland Scholten 90.07	4
(Scotland) Jamie Harvey 85.42	2
12	(England) Denis Ovens 98.75	4
(England) Mark Holden 83.81	1
4	(Canada) John Part 89.80	4
(Canada) Gerry Convery 87.62	1
13	(England) Mark Dudbridge 86.87	4
(Wales) Richie Burnett 85.66	3
2	(England) Phil Taylor 102.87	4
(England) Alex Roy 87.13	0
15	(England) Dennis Priestley 77.87	4
(England) Lionel Sams 80.50	1
7	(England) Kevin Painter 87.17	4
(England) Wayne Jones 84.16	2
10	(England) Andy Jenkins 85.22	4
(England) Peter Evison 67.34	0
6	(England) Ronnie Baxter 93.54	4
(England) Terry Jenkins 90.79	2
11	(England) Dennis Smith 86.10	2
(England) Bob Anderson 86.55	4
3	(England) Peter Manley 85.61	2
(Netherlands) Josephus Schenk 82.67	4
14	(England) Steve Beaton 84.53	2
(England) Andy Hamilton 89.33	4

Fourth round (best of 7 sets); 31 December
1	(England) Colin Lloyd 90.91	4
(England) Chris Mason 94.69	3
8	(England) Wayne Mardle 86.25	4
(England) Paul Williams 84.65	3
5	(Netherlands) Roland Scholten 87.36	2
12	(England) Denis Ovens 88.61	4
4	(Canada) John Part 91.67	2
13	(England) Mark Dudbridge 96.30	4
2	(England) Phil Taylor 100.31	4
15	(England) Dennis Priestley 91.32	0
7	(England) Kevin Painter 91.50	4
10	(England) Andy Jenkins 87.27	3
6	(England) Ronnie Baxter 88.62	2
(England) Bob Anderson 89.08	4
(Netherlands) Josephus Schenk 83.40	1
(England) Andy Hamilton 85.96	4

Quarter-finals (best of 9 sets); 1 January
1	(England) Colin Lloyd 83.76	4
8	(England) Wayne Mardle 86.82	5
12	(England) Denis Ovens 84.18	3
13	(England) Mark Dudbridge 91.15	5
2	(England) Phil Taylor 99.72	5
7	(England) Kevin Painter 93.90	1
(England) Bob Anderson 94.33	5
(England) Andy Hamilton 94.46	1

Semi-finals (best of 11 sets); 2 January
8	(England) Wayne Mardle 90.44	4
13	(England) Mark Dudbridge 90.48	6
2	(England) Phil Taylor 93.54	6
(England) Bob Anderson 91.61	2

Final (best of 13 sets); 3 January
13	(England) Mark Dudbridge 90.66	4
2	(England) Phil Taylor 96.14	7

== Representation from different countries ==
This table shows the number of players by country in the World Championship, the total number including round 1 & 2.

	(England) ENG	(Netherlands) NED	(Scotland) SCO	(Wales) WAL	(Canada) CAN	(China) CHN	(Barbados) BAR	(United States) USA	(Japan) JPN	(Australia) AUS	Total
Final	2	0	0	0	0	0	0	0	0	0	2
Semis	4	0	0	0	0	0	0	0	0	0	4
Quarters	8	0	0	0	0	0	0	0	0	0	8
Round 4	13	2	0	0	1	0	0	0	0	0	16
Round 3	25	2	1	1	3	0	0	0	0	0	32
Round 2	12	1	1	0	2	0	0	0	0	0	16
Round 1	6	1	1	1	2	1	1	1	1	1	16
Total	34	2	2	2	3	1	1	1	1	1	48
