= 2001 World Matchplay =

2001 Stan James World Matchplay

Tournament information
- Dates: 29 July–4 August 2001
- Venue: Winter Gardens
- Location: Blackpool
- Country: England
- Organisation(s): PDC
- Format: Legs
- Prize fund: £65,000
- Winner's share: £14,000
- High checkout: 170 (England) Dave Askew

Champion(s)
- (England) Phil Taylor

The 2001 Stan James World Matchplay was a darts tournament held in the Empress Ballroom at the Winter Gardens, Blackpool. This was the second World Matchplay tournament to be sponsored by UK bookmaker Stan James.

The tournament ran from 29 July–4 August 2001, and was won by Phil Taylor.

== Prize money ==
The prize fund was £65,000.

Position (no. of players)		Prize money (Total: £65,000)
Winner	(1)	£14,000
Runner-Up	(1)	£7,000
Semi-finalists	(2)	£4,000
Quarter-finalists	(4)	£2,000
Second round	(8)	£1,500
First round	(16)	£1,000

== Seeds ==
There were eight seeds for the competition.

1. (England) Peter Manley
2. (England) Alan Warriner
3. (England) Phil Taylor
4. (England) Rod Harrington
5. (England) Dennis Priestley
6. (Canada) John Part
7. (England) Ronnie Baxter
8. (England) Dave Askew

== Results ==
Players in bold denote match winners.

**First round** (best of 19 legs); 29–31 July
1	(England) Peter Manley 89.69	8
(England) **Steve Beaton** 89.16	**10**
(Netherlands) **Roland Scholten** 90.56	**10**
(United States) Steve Brown 80.19	4
8	(England) **Dave Askew** 77.30	**10**
(England) Graeme Stoddart 76.91	8
(England) Colin Lloyd 82.23	10
(England) **Cliff Lazarenko** 84.36	**12**
5	(England) **Dennis Priestley** 86.40	**10**
(England) Kevin Painter 85.50	7
(England) Bob Anderson 81.22	7
(Wales) **Richie Burnett** 87.97	**10**
4	(England) Rod Harrington 84.93	7
(England) **Andy Jenkins** 89.13	**10**
(England) Shayne Burgess 66.83	5
(England) **Nigel Justice** 72.70	**10**
2	(England) **Alan Warriner** 89.53	**11**
(England) Denis Ovens 85.11	9
(England) **Martin Adams** 87.68	**10**
(England) Mick Manning 88.19	7
7	(England) **Ronnie Baxter** 93.87	**10**
(England) Peter Evison 84.18	3
(England) Chris Mason 77.17	4
(England) **Dennis Smith** 93.88	**10**
6	(Canada) **John Part** 93.57	**10**
(England) Keith Deller 86.77	4
(England) Reg Harding 81.10	5
(England) **John Lowe** 86.27	**10**
3	(England) **Phil Taylor** 101.16	**10**
(Scotland) Jamie Harvey 85.84	2
(United States) Paul Lim 77.57	6
(England) **Alex Roy** 88.61	**10**

**Second round** (best of 25 legs); 31 July–1 August
(England) **Steve Beaton** 94.44	**15**
(Netherlands) Roland Scholten 94.15	13
(England) Dave Askew 78.58	9
(England) **Cliff Lazarenko** 84.23	**13**
5	(England) Dennis Priestley 93.72	13
(Wales) **Richie Burnett** 94.75	**15**
(England) **Andy Jenkins** 85.87	**13**
(England) Nigel Justice 76.87	7
2	(England) Alan Warriner 92.12	11
(England) **Martin Adams** 90.21	**13**
7	(England) Ronnie Baxter 92.76	13
(England) **Dennis Smith** 95.00	**15**
6	(Canada) **John Part** 95.34	**13**
(England) John Lowe 88.19	7
3	(England) **Phil Taylor** 97.71	**13**
(England) Alex Roy 82.02	5

**Quarter-finals** (best of 31 legs); 2 August
(England) **Steve Beaton** 92.32	**16**
(England) Cliff Lazarenko 82.77	7
(Wales) **Richie Burnett** 92.01	**16**
(England) Andy Jenkins 90.42	13
(England) **Martin Adams** 94.26	**16**
(England) Dennis Smith 94.74	12
6	(Canada) John Part 92.55	4
3	(England) **Phil Taylor** 101.37	**16**

**Semi-finals** (best of 33 legs); 3 August
(England) Steve Beaton 84.39	6
(Wales) **Richie Burnett** 91.11	**17**
(England) Martin Adams 94.95	9
3	(England) **Phil Taylor** 102.99	**17**

**Final** (best of 35 legs); 4 August
(Wales) Richie Burnett 90.99	10
3	(England) **Phil Taylor** 99.57	**18**
