= Anthony Forde (darts player) =

Barbadian darts player (born 1962)

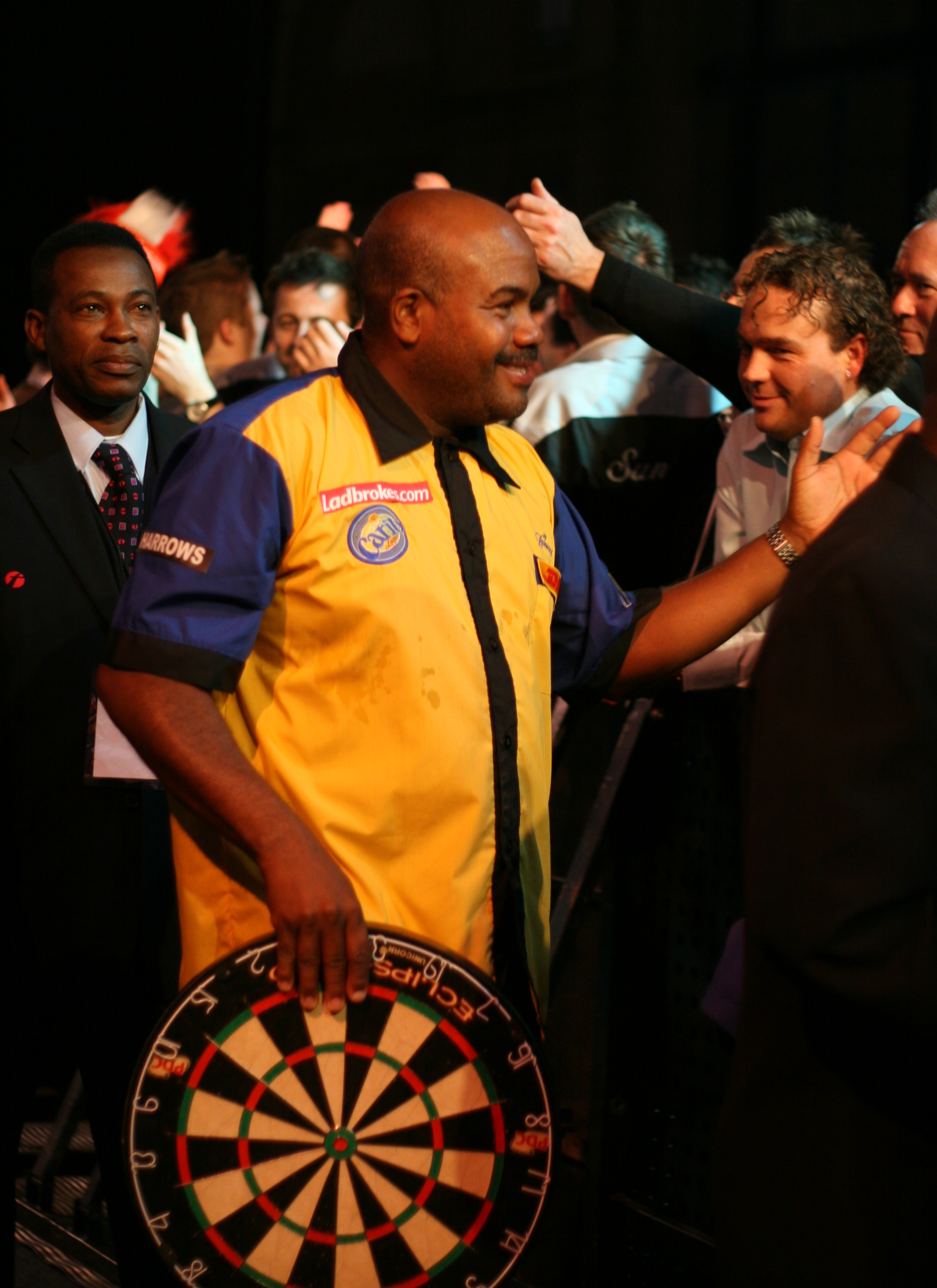
- Forde in 2007

Personal information
- Born: 6 July 1962 (age 64) Bridgetown, Barbados
- Home town: Bridgetown, Barbados

Sport
- Sport: Darts
- Playing since: 1990
- Darts: 22 Gram
- Laterality: Right-handed
- Walk-on music: "Sun Is Shining" by Bob Marley

Organisation (see split in darts)
- PDC: 2004–2018

PDC premier events – best performances
- World Championship: Last 48: 2005

Other tournament wins
- Tournament: Years
- Caribbean and South American Masters: 2004, 2007

Anthony Forde (born July 6, 1962) is a Barbadian former professional darts player.

== Career ==
Forde won the 2004 Caribbean and South American Masters which earned him a place in the 2005 PDC World Darts Championship, where he lost in the first round to John Verwey. He won the tournament again in 2007, which earned him a place in the 2008 PDC World Darts Championship. He defeated Japan's Akihiro Nagakawa in the preliminary round and faced reigning champion Raymond van Barneveld in the first round where he lost 3-0.

Forde was denied a third visit to the World Championship after losing in the final of the 2009 Caribbean and South American Masters to 2003 champion Norman Madhoo of Guyana.

Forde finished as the runner-up in the 2018 WDF Americas Cup, losing to Robin Albury 1–4.

Forde quit the PDC in 2018.

== World Championship results ==
=== PDC ===
- 2005: Last 48 (lost to John Verwey 2–3) (sets)
- 2008: Last 64 (lost to Raymond van Barneveld 0–3)
