= 1997 World Matchplay =

1997 Webster's World Matchplay

Tournament information
- Dates: 28 July–2 August 1997
- Venue: Winter Gardens
- Location: Blackpool
- Country: England
- Organisation(s): PDC
- Format: Legs
- Prize fund: £46,000
- Winner's share: £12,000
- High checkout: 164 (England) Phil Taylor

Champion(s)
- (England) Phil Taylor

The 1997 Webster's World Matchplay was the fourth time the World Matchplay darts tournament had been held in the Empress Ballroom at the Winter Gardens, Blackpool from 28 July to 2 August 1997.

Two Preliminary round ties were decided even before the players could even reach the oche, with the USA's Larry Butler and Holland's Raymond Barneveld being disqualified for failing to arrive at the venue in enough time to play their rivals, allowing Dean Allsop and Mick Manning an easy passage to the first round.

This was brewery Samuel Webster's third and final year as tournament sponsor. The tournament was won by Phil Taylor.

== Prize money ==
The prize fund was £46,000.

Position (no. of players)		Prize money (Total: £46,000)
Winner	(1)	£12,000
Runner-Up	(1)	£6,000
Third place	(1)	£3,250
Fourth place	(1)	£2,750
Quarter-finalists	(4)	£1,700
Second round	(8)	£900
First round	(16)	£500

== Seeds ==
There were eight seeds for the tournament.

1. (England) Phil Taylor
2. (England) Peter Evison
3. (England) Dennis Priestley
4. (England) Rod Harrington
5. (England) Keith Deller
6. (England) Alan Warriner
7. (Scotland) Jamie Harvey
8. (England) Bob Anderson

== Results ==
Players in bold denote match winners.

=== Preliminary round ===
Player	Score	Player
**John Ferrell** (England)	6–1	(England) Paul Cook
**Anthony Ridler** (Wales)	6–1	(United States) Gerome Vardaro
**Darryl Fitton** (England)	6–4	(England) Ritchie Gardner
**Andy Jenkins** (England)	6–3	(Canada) Avtar Gill
**Drew O'Neill** (Scotland)	6–4	(Canada) John Part
**Richie Burnett** (Wales)	6–1	(England) Colin Monk
**Mick Manning** (England)	bye	(Netherlands) Raymond van Barneveld
**Dean Allsop** (England)	bye	(United States) Larry Butler

=== Last 32 ===
**First round** (best of 15 legs); 28–29 July
1	(England) **Phil Taylor** 113.43	**8**
(United States) Gary Mawson 95.22	0
Q	(England) **Mick Manning** 76.20	**8**
(England) Harry Robinson 78.21	3
8	(England) **Bob Anderson** 85.62	**8**
Q	(England) Dean Allsop 78.15	5
(United States) **Steve Brown** 86.49	**8**
(United States) Sean Downs 73.35	0
5	(England) Keith Deller 75.84	4
(England) **Kevin Spiolek** 81.30	**8**
Q	(Scotland) **Drew O'Neill** 80.40	**8**
Q	(England) John Ferrell 77.88	5
4	(England) **Rod Harrington** 101.22	**8**
(England) Cliff Lazarenko 89.37	2
(England) **Dennis Smith** 86.07	**8**
(England) Eric Bristow 81.15	2
2	(England) **Peter Evison** 89.37	**8**
(England) Graeme Stoddart 73.17	1
Q	(Wales) **Anthony Ridler**	**8**
(United States) Gerald Verrier	5
7	(Scotland) Jamie Harvey 87.57	6
(United States) **Paul Lim** 89.13	**8**
Q	(Wales) **Richie Burnett** 93.57	**8**
(England) Chris Mason 88.05	5
6	(England) **Alan Warriner** 96.57	**8**
(England) Steve Raw 82.89	3
(England) **Peter Manley** 84.63	**8**
Q	(England) Darryl Fitton 83.55	6
3	(England) **Dennis Priestley** 85.77	**8**
Q	(England) Andy Jenkins 84.51	6
(England) **Shayne Burgess** 93.36	**15**
(England) John Lowe 95.13	13

**Second round** (best of 15 legs); 30 July
1	(England) **Phil Taylor** 92.01	**8**
Q	(England) Mick Manning 74.91	2
8	(England) **Bob Anderson** 88.23	**8**
(United States) Steve Brown 85.50	4
(England) **Kevin Spiolek** 79.50	**8**
(Scotland) Drew O'Neill 68.85	4
4	(England) **Rod Harrington** 86.07	**8**
(England) Dennis Smith 82.59	2
2	(England) **Peter Evison**	**8**
Q	(Wales) Anthony Ridler	5
(United States) Paul Lim 84.54	7
Q	(Wales) **Richie Burnett** 86.13	**9**
6	(England) **Alan Warriner** 92.91	**8**
(England) Peter Manley 87.00	1
3	(England) **Dennis Priestley** 94.77	**8**
(England) Shayne Burgess 90.06	5

**Quarter-finals** (best of 21 legs); 31 July
1	(England) **Phil Taylor** 97.29	**11**
8	(England) Bob Anderson 88.92	2
(England) Kevin Spiolek 83.88	5
4	(England) **Rod Harrington** 93.51	**11**
2	(England) Peter Evison 91.11	9
Q	(Wales) **Richie Burnett** 96.00	**11**
6	(England) **Alan Warriner** 101.55	**11**
3	(England) Dennis Priestley 97.23	7

**Semi-finals** (best of 25 legs); 1 August
1	(England) **Phil Taylor** 99.21	**13**
4	(England) Rod Harrington 95.31	9
Q	(Wales) Richie Burnett 87.60	9
6	(England) **Alan Warriner** 91.05	**13**

**Final** (best of 31 legs); 2 August
1	(England) **Phil Taylor** 106.32	**16**
6	(England) Alan Warriner 98.43	11

Third place playoff (best of 21 legs) (England) (4) Rod Harrington 11–10 Richie Burnett (Wales)
