= 2001 Denmark Open darts =

Denmark Open

Tournament information
- Dates: 2001
- Country: Denmark
- Organisation(s): BDO, WDF, DDU

Champion(s)
- (England) Wayne Mardle

2001 Denmark Open is a darts tournament, which took place in Denmark, Farum in 2001.

== Results ==
Round	Player
Winner	(England) Wayne Mardle
Final	(Finland) Jarkko Komula
Semi-finals	(Finland) Marko Pusa
Semi-finals	(England) Ted Hankey
Quarter-finals	(England) Kevin Painter
Quarter-finals	(England) Andy Morris
Quarter-finals	(England) Mark Landers
Quarter-finals	(Wales) Martyn Freeman
Last 16	(England) Ronnie Baxter
Last 16	(England) Andy Jenkins
Last 16	(England) John Walton
Last 16	(England) Steve Beaton
Last 16	(England) Chris Mason
Last 16	(Australia) Tony David
Last 16	(England) Wayne Jones
Last 16	(Netherlands) Vincent van der Voort
