= Ian Sarfas =

English darts player

Personal information
- Born: 10 June 1970 (age 56) London, England
- Home town: Plaistow, Newham, England

Sport
- Sport: Darts
- Playing since: 1990
- Darts: 19g
- Laterality: Right-handed

Organisation (see split in darts)
- BDO: 1993–1994

WDF major events – best performances
- World Championship: Last 16: 1994

Ian Sarfas (born 10 June 1970) is an English former professional darts player who competed in British Darts Organisation events in the 1990s.

== Darts career ==
Sarfas played in the 1994 BDO World Darts Championship, beating Dave Askew in the first round before losing to Denmark's Troels Rusel in the second round. Sarfas previously reached the quarter-finals of the 1993 British Open.

== World Championship Results ==
=== BDO ===
- 1994: Second round: (lost to Troels Rusel 1–3) (sets)
