= Dave Askew =

English darts player

Personal information
- Nickname: "Diamond Dave"
- Born: 3 April 1963 (age 63) Redhill, Surrey, England
- Home town: Redhill, Surrey, England

Sport
- Sport: Darts
- Darts: 19 Gram Phil Taylor
- Laterality: Right-handed
- Walk-on music: "Diamonds Are Forever" by Shirley Bassey

Organisation (see split in darts)
- BDO: 1988–2000
- PDC: 2000–2010

WDF major events – best performances
- World Championship: Last 16: 1995
- World Masters: Quarter Final: 1993

PDC premier events – best performances
- World Championship: Semi Final: 2001, 2002
- World Matchplay: Last 16: 2001, 2002, 2005
- World Grand Prix: Quarter Final: 2001
- UK Open: Last 16: 2005
- US Open/WSoD: Last 64: 2007

Other tournament wins
- Tournament: Years
- Denmark Open French Open Cockney Classic WDF World Cup Windy City Open British Internationals Scandinavian Open Mill Rythe Darts Festival: 1988; 1989; 1989; 1993; 2000; 1992, 1993, 1994, 1995, 2002

Other achievements
- Nine dart finish PDPA Players Championships Germany, 2008

Dave Askew (born 3 April 1963) is a former English professional darts player who competed from 1988 to 2010 in events of the British Darts Organisation (BDO) and Professional Darts Corporation (PDC). He is a two-time semi-finalist of the PDC World Championship (2001 and 2002), losing to eventual winner Phil Taylor on both occasions.

Askew was never a full-time professional and earned his living as a bricklayer.

== Career ==
=== BDO ===
Askew first made his name in 1988 when he defeated Cliff Lazarenko 6–0 in sets to win the Denmark Open. In the same year, he also reached the final of the Swedish Open but lost out to Simon Duke. In 1989 Askew then won the French Open and lifted his first title on TV, the Cockney Classic when he defeated Steve Smith. Askew reached the last 16 of the World Masters in 1992 and narrowly missed out on reaching the World Championship for the first time. He enjoyed a rich vein of form in 1993 reaching the final of the BDO British Open where he lost to Dennis Priestley. Askew then hit a top average of 104.20 in reaching the Final of the Sky Darts Masters on Sky Sports where he was defeated by Scott Coleman of Englishman. A number of other good runs secured his debut at the 1994 BDO World Darts Championship but he was disappointing in losing out Ian Sarfas. In 1995 he came from 2 sets down to defeat number one seed Steve Beaton in the first round of the World Championship before losing to Raymond van Barneveld, who went on to reach his first world final that year. In 1995 Askew defeated Martin Adams and Ronnie Baxter to reach the final of British Matchplay but lost 4–5 in the final to Andy Fordham. Askew also represented England in the British Internationals on numerous occasions and played ten matches, winning eight of these and losing two, he won the title with England on five occasions. He was also selected to represent the English team in the 1993 World Cup and won the title alongside Steve Beaton, Ronnie Baxter and Kevin Kenny by defeating Wales 9–3 in the final. Despite defeating Raymond Van Barneveld in the 1998 World Masters and reaching the semi-finals of the BDO British Open Askew virtually disappeared from the circuit for a few years.

=== PDC ===
Askew resurfaced in the PDC in 2000 and quickly tasted success, enjoying good runs in a number of tournaments. He reached the final of the German Open in March 2000 losing to Shayne Burgess before narrowly losing 3–4 to Phil Taylor in a high-quality final at the Golden Harvest North American Cup. In September 2000 he then won the Windy City Open. He entered the 2001 World Championship as the 8th seed where he produced some great darts in reaching the semi-finals also coming close to a 9 dart finish. Shortly after this, he reached the final of the Irish Masters (losing to Denis Ovens). He beat Chris Mason, Roland Scholten and Dennis Priestley in another fine run to the semi-final of the 2002 World Championship. Shortly after the Worlds, he reached the semi-finals of the Irish Masters again.

Askew was one of the most consistent performers in PDC Floor events enabling him to remain in the World's Top 16 until 2005. However, he struggled to match his early success in TV Tournaments. Askew entered the 2007 World Championship needing to reach the quarter-finals in order to remain in the world's top 32. Askew produced some good form in winning a few matches but just fell short of his target, narrowly losing in the last 16 to Alan Tabern. After dropping out the 32 Askew remained on the cusp of world's top 32 for a while after. His performances on the tour during 2007 earned him a place at the 2008 World Championship where he performed well despite losing out to rising star Adrian Lewis. In 2008, Askew hit a nine-darter on the PDC tour and narrowly missed out on qualification for the World Matchplay. He came within one leg of reaching the 2009 World Championship losing in the final qualifying round 4–5 to Michael Barnard.

Since then, Askew's appearances on the tour became less frequent, failing to enter many PDC Pro Tour events. After the 2009 UK Open in June, Askew did not enter another event until February 2010. His missing of events, in addition to his fading form, led to the end of his PDC career.

== World Championship performances ==
=== BDO ===
- 1994: 1st Round (lost to Ian Sarfas 0–3)
- 1995: 2nd Round (lost to Raymond van Barneveld 0–3)

=== PDC ===
- 2001: Semi Finals (lost to Phil Taylor 0–6)
- 2002: Semi Finals (lost to Phil Taylor 0–6)
- 2003: 3rd Round (lost to Roland Scholten 0–5)
- 2004: 3rd Round (lost to Keith Deller 3–4)
- 2005: 3rd Round (lost to Chris Mason 3–4)
- 2006: 1st Round (lost to Gerry Convery 0–3)
- 2007: 3rd Round (lost to Alan Tabern 3–4)
- 2008: 1st Round (lost to Adrian Lewis 1–3)

== Performance timeline ==
Tournament	1988	1989	1990	1991	1992	1993	1994	1995	1996	1997	1998	1999	2000	2001	2002	2003	2004	2005	2006	2007	2008	2009
BDO World Championship	DNP						L32	L16	DNP					No longer a BDO Member								
Winmau World Masters	L32	DNP			L16	QF	L32	DNP			L32	DNP	L16	DNP								
PDC World Championship	NYF						DNP							SF	SF	L16	L32	L32	L64	L16	L64	DNQ
World Matchplay	NYF						DNP						L32	L16	L16	L32	L32	L16	L32	DNQ		
World Grand Prix	Not held										DNP		L24	QF	L32	L32	L32	L32	L32	DNQ		
UK Open	Not held															L64	L64	L16	L32	L96	L64	L64

Performance Table Legend
DNP	Did not play at the event	DNQ	Did not qualify for the event	NYF	Not yet founded	L#	lost in the early rounds of the tournament (WR = Wildcard round, RR = Round robin)
QF	lost in the quarter-finals	SF	lost in the semi-finals	RU	lost in the final	W	won the tournament

== Personal life ==
Askew was never a full-time professional and earned his living as a bricklayer. He has a son, Jason, who is also a professional darts player. In 2020, he qualified for the UK Open.
