= Peter Manley =

English darts player

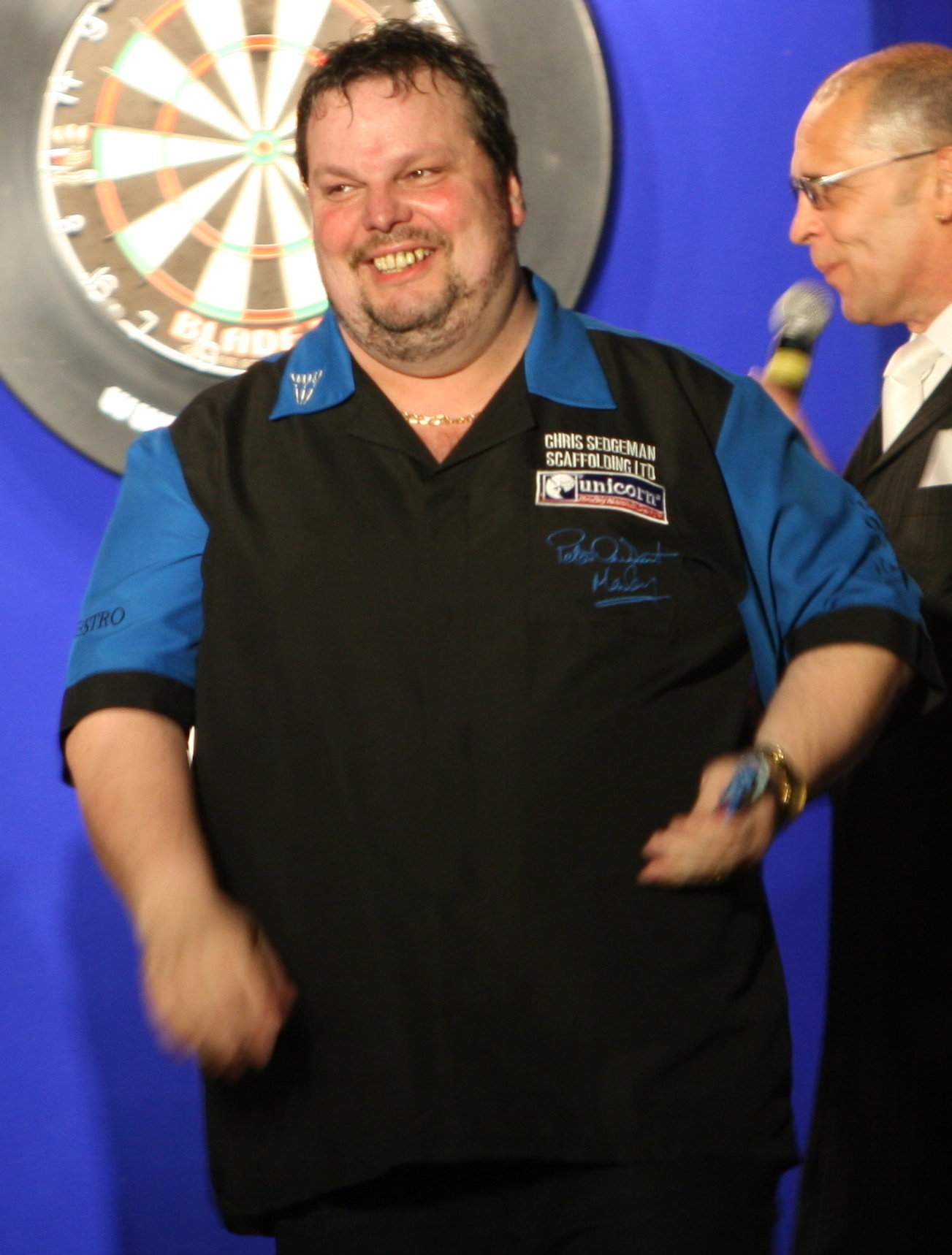
- Manley in 2007

Personal information
- Full name: Peter David Manley
- Nickname: "One Dart"
- Born: 7 March 1962 (age 64) Cheam, London, England
- Home town: Carlisle, Cumbria, England

Sport
- Sport: Darts
- Playing since: 1974
- Darts: 21g Winmau Signature
- Laterality: Right-handed
- Walk-on music: "Amarillo" by Tony Christie preceded opening to "Who Are You" by The Who

Organisation (see split in darts)
- BDO: 1995–1996
- PDC: 1996–2017

WDF major events – best performances
- World Masters: Last 16: 1998
- World Trophy: Quarter-final: 2007
- Int. Darts League: Last 32 Group: 2007
- Finder Masters: Semi-final: 2000

PDC premier events – best performances
- World Championship: Runner-up: 1999, 2002, 2006
- World Matchplay: Runner-up: 1999
- World Grand Prix: Semi-final: 1998, 1999, 2000, 2003, 2006
- UK Open: Semi-final: 2005
- Grand Slam: Group Stages: 2007
- European Championship: Semi-final: 2008
- Premier League: Semi-final: 2005
- Championship League: Group Six: 2008
- Desert Classic: Winner (1): 2003
- US Open/WSoD: Last 16: 2007
- PC Finals: Last 32: 2009, 2010

WSDT major events – best performances
- World Championship: Last 16: 2022
- World Matchplay: Quarter-final: 2022

Other tournament wins
- Years
Canadian Open	2000
England Open	1999
French Open	1998
Ireland Open Spring Classic	2001
Irish Masters	2004
Isle of Man Open	1998, 2004
Le Skratch Montreal Open	2000
North American Open	1997
Open Holland Masters	2007
PDC Eastbourne Open	2003
PDC Northern Ireland Open	2001
Sunparks Masters	2002
Vauxhall Autumn Open	2005
UK Open Regionals (x4)
2002, 2003 (x3)

Other achievements
PDC World number one, September 2000 to October 2001
- Updated on 11 August 2018

Peter David Manley (born 7 March 1962) is an English former professional darts player who competed in Professional Darts Corporation (PDC) events from 1996 until 2017. He won one major title, the Las Vegas Desert Classic, in 2003, and twice held the number one ranking. He also reached the World Championship final in 1999, 2002 and 2006, losing to Phil Taylor on each occasion. Declining form led to him losing his place on the PDC tour in 2011.

Manley was nicknamed "One Dart" by commentator Tony Green after hitting the winning double on numerous occasions with his first dart during his first televised appearance at the 1995 Unipart European Masters, where he eventually lost in the final to Mike Gregory. Manley was also known for his walk on and personality. Described as someone whom "darts crowds love to hate", his antics sometimes led to run-ins with fellow players.

== Darting career ==
Manley made his debut in 1996 PDC World Matchplay Last 40 to Paul Cook, 5–2, in Last 32 to Dave Kelly 8-2 and Last 16 his losing to Jamie Harvey, 8–3.

Manley is perhaps most famous for his long-running feud with Phil Taylor resulting from his refusal to shake Taylor's hand after losing 7–0 to him in the 2002 PDC World Darts Championship final. He has finished runner-up to Taylor in two other World Championships – losing 6–2 in 1999 and 7–0 in 2006.

His biggest tournament win was 2003 Las Vegas Desert Classic when he beat John Part 16–12 in the final. He is also the chairman of the Professional Darts Players Association, a position he has held for six years. Manley attempted getting a PDC Tour card in the Q-School in 2012, 2013, 2014, 2015, 2016, 2017, 2018 and 2019 but was unsuccessful.

In 2022, Manley appeared in the inaugural World Seniors Darts Championship and reached the second round, where after winning against former BDO world finalist, Deta Hedman 3 – 1 he suffered a 3 – 1 defeat to old time rival Phil Taylor. Although not competing in the 2022 World Seniors Darts Masters, he made an appearance at the 2022 World Seniors Darts Matchplay in which he managed to reach the Quarter Finals after beating John Part in a deciding leg. His run was then ended once more by Phil Taylor. Manley entered the Modus Online Super League, in December 2022 in preparation for the 2023 World Seniors Darts Championship in which he pulled off a 4 – 2 win over Alan Norris.

=== Crowd popularity ===
Manley's refusal to shake Taylor's hand after his 7-0 World Championship thrashing in 2002 led to darts fans booing him for many years. The boos became more ironic and good-natured when in 2005 Manley changed his entrance theme from Chumbawamba's Tubthumping to Tony Christie's "Is This the Way to Amarillo". By the end of his career Manley was seen by darts crowds as being more of a 'pantomime villain' rather than subject to genuine animosity which had occurred previously. Manley has gone on to say that whilst the booing and crowd reaction was hard for him and his family to take in the early days, it helped him as his career went on and ensured his popularity on the exhibition circuit.

=== Controversy ===
Despite being chairman of the Players' Union (the Professional Darts Players Association – PDPA), Manley was often the subject of controversy with fellow players. Most notably Taylor in the aforementioned incident, and also in the 2006 PDC World Darts Championship. During that tournament, Manley was accused of gamesmanship against Dennis Smith and in a later round against Taylor's protégé, Adrian Lewis. Manley muttered the words "diddley diddley dum" to his opponent, resulting in Lewis leaving the stage in anger. Despite serving as Mardle's best man at his wedding Manley also had a notable spat with the former PDC professional player Wayne Mardle. Mardle accused Manley of being a cheat in his autobiography. Manley has also had notable spats with the likes of Roland Scholten, John Lowe, Rod Harrington, Dave Jowett and Wynand Havenga.

== World Championship results ==
=== PDC ===
- 1997: Preliminary round (lost to Chris Mason 0–3) (sets)
- 1998: Quarter-finals (lost to Dennis Priestley 3–4)
- 1999: Runner-up (lost to Phil Taylor 2–6)
- 2000: Semi-finals (lost to Dennis Priestley 2–5)
- 2001: First round (lost to Jamie Harvey 2–3)
- 2002: Runner-up (lost to Phil Taylor 0–7)
- 2003: Second round (lost to Simon Whitlock 1–4)
- 2004: Quarter-finals (lost to Bob Anderson 2–5)
- 2005: Third round (lost to Josephus Schenk 2–4)
- 2006: Runner-up (lost to Phil Taylor 0–7)
- 2007: Second round (lost to Wynand Havenga 3–4)
- 2008: Quarter-finals (lost to Kirk Shepherd 4–5)
- 2009: First round (lost to Mensur Suljović 2–3)
- 2010: Second round (lost to Mark Webster 2–4)

=== WSDT ===
- 2022: Second round (lost to Phil Taylor 1–3)
- 2023: First round (lost to Scott Mitchell 0–3)

== Career finals ==
=== PDC major finals: 5 (1 title) ===
Legend
World Championship (0–3)
World Matchplay (0–1)
Las Vegas Desert Classic (1–0)

Outcome	No.	Year	Championship	Opponent in the final	Score
Runner-up	1.	1999	World Championship	Phil Taylor	2–6 (s)
Runner-up	2.	1999	World Matchplay	Rod Harrington	17–19 (l)
Runner-up	3.	2002	World Championship (2)	Phil Taylor	0–7 (s)
Winner	1.	2003	Las Vegas Desert Classic	John Part	16–12 (l)
Runner-up	4.	2006	World Championship (3)	Phil Taylor	0–7 (s)

=== Independent major finals: 1 ===
Outcome	No.	Year	Championship	Opponent in the final	Score
Runner-up	1.	2007	Masters of Darts	(Netherlands) Raymond van Barneveld	0–7 (s)

== Career statistics ==
=== Performance timeline ===
==== BDO ====
Tournament	1995	1996	1997	1998	1999	2000	2001	2002	2003	2004	2005	2006	2007
BDO Ranked televised events
World Masters	DNP		1R	4R	2R	2R	2R	3R	DNP				
European Masters	F	Not held											
Finder Darts Masters	Not held					SF	RR	DNP				NH	DNP
World Darts Trophy	Not held							DNP				1R	QF
International Darts League	Not held								DNP				RR
News of the World	Not held		QF	Not held									

==== PDC ====
Tournament	1996	1997	1998	1999	2000	2001	2002	2003	2004	2005	2006	2007	2008	2009	2010	2011
PDC Ranked televised events
World Championship	DNP	Prel.	QF	F	SF	1R	F	2R	QF	3R	F	2R	QF	1R	2R	DNQ
UK Open	Not held							4R	3R	SF	3R	4R	4R	4R	2R	1R
World Matchplay	2R	2R	QF	F	1R	1R	1R	SF	QF	SF	1R	1R	2R	DNQ		
World Grand Prix	Not held		SF	SF	SF	1R	1R	SF	2R	2R	SF	1R	1R	DNQ		
Grand Slam	Not held												RR	DNQ		
European Championship	Not held												SF	DNQ		
Players Championship Finals	Not held													1R	1R	DNQ
PDC Non-ranked televised events
Premier League	Not held									SF	6th	6th	6th	DNP		
PDC Past major events
Las Vegas Desert Classic	Not held						1R	W	2R	1R	2R	SF	SF	2R	NH	
Masters of Darts	Not held									DNP	NH	F	Not held			
Career statistics
Year-end ranking	NR	7	4	1	1	4	6	3	3	5	7	5	13	20	38	66

Performance Table Legend
W	Won the tournament	F	Finalist	SF	Semifinalist	QF	Quarterfinalist	#R; RR; Prel.	Lost in # round Round-robin; Preliminary round	DQ	Disqualified
DNQ	Did not qualify	DNP	Did not participate	WD	Withdrew	NH	Tournament not held	#R; RR; Prel.	Lost in # round Round-robin; Preliminary round	NYF	Not yet founded

Sporting positions
Preceded by Phil Taylor	PDC World Number One; 24 September 2000 – 28 October 2001	Succeeded by Alan Warriner
