= Chris Mason (darts player) =

English darts player (born 1969)

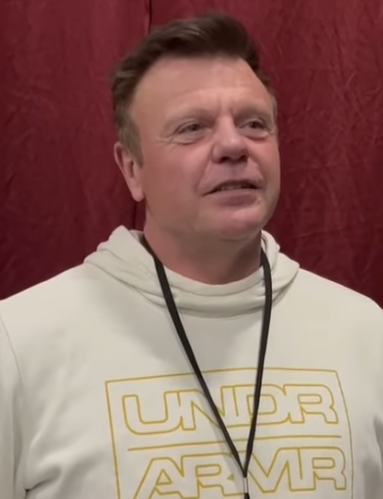
- Mason in 2023

Personal information
- Full name: Christopher John Mason
- Nickname: "Mace the Ace"
- Born: 17 December 1969 (age 56) Bristol, England
- Home town: Tiverton, England

Sport
- Sport: Darts
- Playing since: 1990
- Darts: 24g Custom Made
- Laterality: Right-handed
- Walk-on music: "Ace of Spades" by Motörhead

Organisation (see split in darts)
- BDO: 1994–1996, 1998–2001, 2015–2016
- PDC: 1996–1997, 2002–2014

WDF major events – best performances
- World Championship: Semi-final: 1999, 2000
- World Masters: Semi-final: 2000
- Int. Darts League: Preliminary Stage: 2007

PDC premier events – best performances
- World Championship: Quarter-final: 2003
- World Matchplay: Semi-final: 1998
- World Grand Prix: Quarter-final: 1999, 2000, 2004
- UK Open: Quarter-final: 2005
- Grand Slam: Group Stage: 2007
- European Championship: Last 32: 2008
- Championship League: Initial Groups, 7th, 2008
- Desert Classic: Quarter-finals: 2006
- US Open/WSoD: Quarter-final: 2008
- PC Finals: Last 32: 2009

WSDT major events – best performances
- World Championship: Quarter-final: 2024
- World Matchplay: Last 16: 2024
- World Masters: Quarter-final: 2023

Other tournament wins
- Tournament: Years
- England Open Irish Masters Scottish Open Vauxhall Autumn Open Vauxhall Spring Open West Tyrone Open UK Open Regionals Regional Finals (Southern England): 2001; 2000; 1995; 2004; 2005; 2006 2006

Christopher John Mason (born 17 December 1969) is an English former professional darts player who competed in Professional Darts Corporation (PDC) and British Darts Organisation (BDO) events. Nicknamed Mace the Ace, Mason reached back to back semi-finals of the BDO World Championship in 1999 and 2000. He also reached the semi-finals at the 2000 Winmau World Masters and the PDC's 1998 World Matchplay.

== BDO and first PDC spell ==
Mason began his career in the British Darts Organisation, making his World Championship debut at the 1996 BDO World Championship. He lost 0–3 to Andy Fordham. After joining the World Darts Council in 1996, Mason competed in the 1996 World Matchplay, losing to Alan Warriner. In October 1996, Mason reached the final of the Sky Sports World Pairs partnered by Steve Raw, where they were narrowly beaten by Phil Taylor and Bob Anderson. Mason then competed in the 1997 WDC World Championship, where he lost 1–3 to Gerald Verrier and 0–3 to Taylor in the group stage.

Shortly after the BDO and PDC agreed the Tomlin Order in June 1997, some BDO players participated in the World Matchplay event between 1997 and 2001, and in the World Grand Prix event between 1998 and 2001. Mason went back to playing in the BDO World Championship after the Tomlin Order, but continued to play in other PDC televised majors outside of their World Championship. After a second round defeat in the BDO world championships in 1998, he went on to reach the semi-finals of the 1998 World Matchplay, narrowly losing 11–13 to Ronnie Baxter. The following year, Mason reached the quarter-finals of the 1999 World Matchplay, losing 11–16 to Taylor. Mason also reached the quarter-finals of the World Grand Prix events in 1999 and 2000, losing to Peter Manley and Taylor respectively.

Mason enjoyed his best achievement in the 1999 BDO World Championship, when he recovered from 1–4 down in sets in his best-of-nine quarter-final match against Martin Adams, survived many match darts against him before eventually winning 5–4 in sets, winning by 6–4 in legs in the deciding set. This match is regarded as one of the best matches on television, and it included 29 180s between the players; 13 for Mason and 16 for Adams. He lost the semi-final 2–5 to reigning BDO World Champion, Raymond van Barneveld, three of those sets on deciding legs.

Mason avenged the defeat to van Barneveld the following year by beating van Barneveld 3–1 in the first round, averaging over 100. Mason also beat Fordham in the quarter-finals before losing 4–5 to Ted Hankey in the semi-finals, after leading 4–2. This match holds the 180 record for a 9 set match with 38 180's hit in the match, 16 of them from Mason, marking the second consecutive year that he had lost to the eventual champion in the semi-finals.

Mason's last appearance at Lakeside was a first round defeat to Mervyn King in 2001. He also reached the semi-final of the BDO's other major tournament, the Winmau World Masters in 2000, losing to the eventual champion, John Walton.

Mason hit a nine dart finish in the last 64 stage of the 1999 Winmau World Masters.

== PDC career ==
In late 2001, the news came through that virtually all PDC televised tournaments would be closed off to players who did not play in the PDC World Darts Championship. As a result, Mason became one of the "Skol Six" who decided to play the PDC World Championship from 2002 onwards, so that they could continue to play in other PDC televised events.

Mason lost in the first round of the 2002 PDC World Championship to Dave Askew, but reached the quarter-finals in 2003 – losing to eventual champion, John Part. He missed most tournaments in 2003 and 2004 while he served a prison sentence – but he returned to play in the 2004 World Grand Prix in October, and reached the quarter-finals of the event for the third time, this time losing to Steve Beaton.

Mason has many titles to his name including the Irish Masters and the Vauxhall Pro Open on 3 occasions. Mason won the Irish Masters which was screened by Sky and also has lifted the Scottish Open and the English Open titles to his impressive résumé. Mason was Taylor's opposition at the 2002 World Matchplay when Taylor hit the first PDC nine-dart finish to be televised live on British screens.

Mason has reached the quarter-finals in a few other PDC events, including the 2005 UK Open, the 2006 Las Vegas Desert Classic, and the 2006 World Matchplay.

== Retirement ==
Whilst commentating on the 2010 Grand Slam of Darts, on broadcaster ITV, Mason announced that he intended to retire from darts following the forthcoming qualifying rounds of the 2011 PDC World Championship, declaring that "even if I do qualify, which is unlikely, the World Championships will be my swansong". It was later announced by the PDC that he declined the opportunity of a Pro Tour Card for 2011, effectively confirming his decision – although he would be eligible to compete in qualifiers for Pro Tour event or switch to the BDO circuit instead. Mason hinted that he may get back into darts but it would be a very professional job stating that he would begin to give 100% as he claimed he only gave 70% during his career.

== Out of retirement ==
In January 2012, he entered the Professional Darts Corporation Pro Tour 'Q School' qualifying tournament but failed to win a PDC Tour Card. He re-attempted to obtain a PDC Tour Card in January 2014, however he was not successful.

Mason competed in both the 2023 World Seniors Darts Championship and the 2024 World Seniors Darts Championship. He was knocked out in the first round and quarter-finals respectively.

In February 2025, he announced his ultimate retirement from the sport after the 2025 World Seniors Darts Championship.

== Controversy ==
Mason's personal life has been under much scrutiny. Mason was convicted of assault and assault with intent to resist arrest in March 1990 and sentenced to 180 hours community service. This was followed by a three-month jail sentence suspended for 12 months for actual bodily harm and, in August 1993, by three years' probation for assault causing actual bodily harm.

=== Prison sentence ===
On 14 April 2003, Mason and two friends Mark and Simon Gibson, were found guilty of aggravated burglary with intent to cause grievous bodily harm. The victim of the attack, Poole scaffolder Neal Harley, was left with a broken nose, scalp cuts, facial swelling and bruising. The attack was sparked by a Yorkshire terrier dog named Doris which Mark Gibson had bought for Harley's fiancée Jane Graham while they were having a relationship some years earlier and had been "hostile" towards her new boyfriends. On 3 April 2002, Ms Graham had agreed to care for the dog but later returned it as it behaved too aggressively. Prosecutor, Mark Worsley, said that because of this Mark Gibson decided to confront Mr Harley and turned up that night with a hammer and his accomplices, saying: "Come on boys, let's do him". The Gibson brothers received five- and six-year sentences and Mason received a three-year sentence on 2 June 2003, but he served just over a year.

=== 2007 World championship ===
Mason hit the headlines for criticising Phil Taylor in the newspapers before their last 16 match at the 2007 World Championship and allegedly swearing at him during the post-match handshake on-stage after Taylor beat him 4–0. He did apologise to Taylor after the tournament ended, but received a £750 fine and a four-month ban (suspended for 12 months) from the Darts Regulation Authority.

=== Benefit fraud ===
In June 2010, he was given a community order at Newcastle Magistrates Court for benefit fraud charges after he admitted to not declaring £45,000 of winnings between 2006 and 2007 while claiming benefits. He had been arrested whilst preparing to compete at the UK Open televised tournament.

== Television pundit ==
In 2007, Mason became one of ITV's pundits on the inaugural Grand Slam of Darts, initially alongside the 1996 BDO World Champion, Steve Beaton, but since then by the 2001 World Grand Prix champion and 1993 World Championship runner-up, Alan Warriner-Little. It was ITV's return to broadcasting tournament darts after an absence of over a decade. Mason has remained a feature of ITV's darts coverage as a match summariser and co-commentator during ITV's coverage of the Grand Slam of Darts up to 2010, the European Championship, the Players Championship Finals, The Masters, as well as the UK Opens from 2014 onwards.

== Personal life ==
Mason took the decision to move from Kilkenny, Ireland to Stoke-on-Trent late in 2006. A few top players had made Stoke their home and Mason made the move partly so he could practice with Andy Hamilton. However, shortly after the World Championship Hamilton switched to practising with Taylor – who broke off from mentoring Adrian Lewis.

Mason is a supporter of football club Chelsea F.C.

== World Championship performances ==
=== BDO ===
- 1996: First round (lost to Andy Fordham 0–3)
- 1998: Second round (lost to Peter Johnstone 0–3)
- 1999: Semi-finals (lost to Raymond van Barneveld 2–5)
- 2000: Semi-finals (lost to Ted Hankey 4–5)
- 2001: First round (lost to Mervyn King 2–3)

=== PDC ===
- 1997: Group Stage (lost to Gerald Verrier 1–3) & (lost to Phil Taylor 0–3)
- 2002: First round (lost to Dave Askew 3–4)
- 2003: Quarter-finals (lost to John Part 0–5)
- 2005: Third round (lost to Colin Lloyd 3–4)
- 2006: Second round (lost to John Part 3–4)
- 2007: Third round (lost to Phil Taylor 0–4)
- 2008: Second round (lost to Kevin Painter 0–4)
- 2009: First round (lost to John Magowan 0–3)

=== WSDT ===
- 2023: First round (lost to Terry Jenkins 2–3)
- 2024: Quarter-finals (lost to Lisa Ashton 1–3)
- 2025: Second round (lost to John Henderson 2–3)

== Performance timeline ==
BDO

| Tournament | 1996 | 1998 | 1999 | 2000 | 2001 |
|---|---|---|---|---|---|
| World Championship | 1R | 2R | SF | SF | 1R |
| Winmau World Masters | DNP | 1R | 1R | SF | 2R |

PDC

| Tournament | 1996 | 1997 | 1998 | 1999 | 2000 | 2001 | 2002 | 2003 | 2004 | 2005 | 2006 | 2007 | 2008 | 2009 |
|---|---|---|---|---|---|---|---|---|---|---|---|---|---|---|
| World Championship | DNP | RR | DNP | | | | 1R | QF | DNP | 4R | 2R | 3R | 2R | 1R |
| US Open | Not held | | | | | | | | | | | 3R | QF | DNP |
| UK Open | Not held | | | | | | | DNP | | QF | 3R | 3R | 4R | 1R |
| Las Vegas Desert Classic | Not held | | | | | | DNP | | | 1R | QF | DNP | | |
| World Matchplay | 1R | 1R | SF | QF | 2R | 1R | QF | DNP | | | QF | 1R | 1R | DNP |
| World Grand Prix | Not held | | DNP | QF | QF | DNP | 2R | DNP | QF | DNP | 1R | 2R | 1R | DNP |
| Grand Slam | Not held | | | | | | | | | | | RR | DNP | |
| European Championship | Not held | | | | | | | | | | | | 1R | DNP |
| Players Championship Finals | Not held | | | | | | | | | | | | | 1R |

Performance Table Legend
| W | Won the tournament | F | Finalist | SF | Semifinalist | QF | Quarterfinalist | #R; RR; Prel. | Lost in # round Round-robin; Preliminary round | DQ | Disqualified |
| DNQ | Did not qualify | DNP | Did not participate | WD | Withdrew | NH | Tournament not held | #R; RR; Prel. | Lost in # round Round-robin; Preliminary round | NYF | Not yet founded |
