= Dennis Priestley =

English darts player (born 1950)

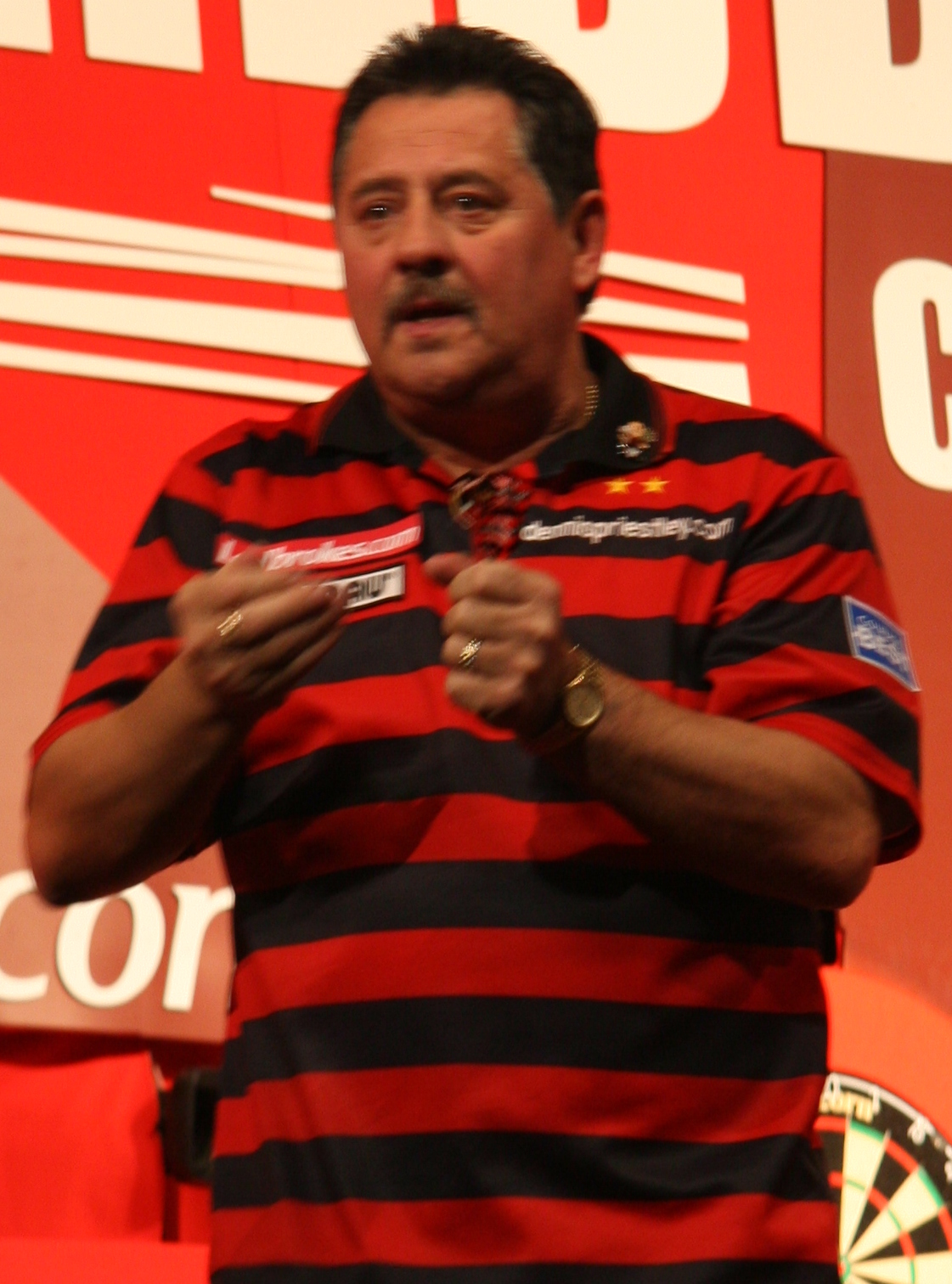
- Priestley in 2007

Personal information
- Nickname: "The Menace"
- Born: 16 July 1950 (age 76) Mexborough, Yorkshire, England

Sport
- Sport: Darts
- Playing since: 1975
- Darts: 17g Winmau Signature
- Laterality: Right-handed
- Walk-on music: "The Long Good Friday" by Francis Monkman "Hell Raiser" by The Sweet

Organisation (see split in darts)
- BDO: 1989–1993
- PDC: 1993–2014 (founding member)

WDF major events – best performances
- World Championship: Winner (1): 1991
- World Masters: Winner (1): 1992
- World Trophy: Last 16: 2007
- Int. Darts League: Last 32 Group: 2007

PDC premier events – best performances
- World Championship: Winner (1): 1994
- World Matchplay: Runner-up: 1994, 1995, 1996
- World Grand Prix: Semi-final: 2000, 2005, 2006
- UK Open: Last 16: 2003, 2004, 2007, 2009, 2012
- Grand Slam: Group Stage: 2007
- European Championship: Last 16: 2008
- Premier League: Semi-final: 2007
- Championship League: Winners Group 7th: 2011
- Desert Classic: Quarter-final: 2006
- PC Finals: Quarter-final: 2009

Other tournament wins
- Years
Antwerp Open	1994, 1995
Australian Masters	1992
British Classic	1997
British Gold Cup	1991, 1992
British Matchplay	1991
British Open	1993
British Pentathlon	1992
Canadian Open	1993, 1994
Gem City Open	1996
Golden Harvest North American Cup	1996
Isle of Man Open	1988, 1989
Jersey Festival of Darts	1991
Le Skratch Montreal Open	2003, 2005
Los Angeles Open	1989, 1992
Pacific Masters	1992
WDC UK Matchplay	1993, 1994
PDC World Pairs	1995
Quebec Open	2003
Vauxhall Spring Pro	2006
Welsh Open	1992
Windy City Open	1997
Witch City Open	1994
World Champions Challenge	1991
Players Championships (×7)
2006, 2008 (×3), 2009 (×2), 2010
UK Open Regionals/Qualifiers
UK Open Regional (South West England)	2007

Other achievements
- November 1994 to April 1995 WDC World Ranked 1
- Updated on 17 February 2008

Dennis Priestley (born 16 July 1950) is an English former professional darts player who competed in British Darts Organisation (BDO) and Professional Darts Corporation (PDC) events. He is a two-time world champion, and was the first player to win both the BDO and WDC (now PDC) world championships, in 1991 and 1994 respectively. He was nicknamed "the Menace", after the Beano character Dennis the Menace, and reflected this by wearing red-and-black and using red-and-black flights.

== Early career ==
Born in Mexborough, West Riding of Yorkshire, Priestley was originally a coal merchant by trade, and did not enter professional darts until he was almost 40 years old. In 1989 he reached the final of the News of the World Darts Championship, in which he was beaten by Dave Whitcombe. Priestley then reached the semi-finals of the 1990 Winmau World Masters, losing to eventual champion Phil Taylor.

== Rise to the top ==
Shortly after becoming a newsagent, Priestley won the 1991 Embassy World Championship, beating Eric Bristow 6–0 in the final and earning £27,000 in prize money. He had defeated defending champion Taylor in his quarter-finals and 1988 champion Bob Anderson in his semi-final. He won the 1992 Winmau World Masters and also picked up many BDO Open events between 1991 and 1993.

=== WDC/PDC ===
Priestley was a founder member of the World Darts Council (WDC) which split from the British Darts Organisation in 1993. As a consequence, Priestley was precluded from assuming the role of England captain which he had been awarded shortly beforehand.

Priestley won the inaugural WDC World Darts Championship in 1994. This high point was surrounded by several wins on the WDC's new professional circuit (including the Skol Matchplay, UK Matchplay, Antwerp Open, and Samson Darts Classic) in 1993 and 1994. Since then, he has been a PDC World Championship runner-up four times, in 1996, 1997, 1998 and 2000, losing to Taylor on all four occasions. Priestley has also been a three-times World Matchplay runner-up, losing to American Larry Butler in 1994, Taylor in 1995 and Peter Evison in 1996.

Between 1991 and 1994, Priestley was the only player to win more than one grand slam/major title (he won three), while he also claimed more top professional events on either circuit than any other player and attained the number-one ranking.

Priestley's ascendancy was ended by Taylor's World Championship and World Matchplay triumphs in 1995. He did win a further major televised title later that year – the inaugural PDC World Pairs partnering Bristow.

His 1996 World Championship Final with Taylor is often seen as one of the best matches in the history of the PDC. Although Priestley hit 15 180s and averaged 101.48 in the match, he was edged out 4–6 by Taylor. Priestley struck 14 180s, had a 10-dart leg and led two-sets-to-nil in the following year's final. It was to no avail as Taylor won 6–3. Taylor stated in his autobiography that Priestley is the "best player [he has] ever faced".

== Other achievements ==
Priestley is the only man to date to win both the BDO and PDC World Championships at his first attempt. Priestley won the 1991 BDO title in his first appearance in the main draw of the Lakeside event, while he won the inaugural PDC World Professional Darts Championship in 1994.

He is the first man to average over 100 in a World Championship final, when he averaged 101.48 in the 1996 WDC World Championship Final in a 4–6 loss to Taylor, despite Taylor's average being almost three points lower at 98.52.

In 1992, Priestley entered the 1993 Embassy World Championship as the number-one seed. In his first-round tie against Jocky Wilson, he set a new record for the highest match average (102.6) at the championship, which stood until 2004.

In his World Championship debut in 1991, he set a new tournament record for 180s (25). That record was broken by Mike Gregory in 1992.

Priestley held the number-one spot in the PDC world rankings between November 1994 and April 1995 and was seeded number-one for the WDC World Championships of 1995 and 1997.

In 1997, Priestley won the British Classic in Blackpool, the first BDO event which PDC players were allowed to enter – as a result of the Tomlin Order – since the 1993 split. Priestley also took the pairs title with Taylor. At around this time, Priestley also took part in a 'Battle of the Champions' contest to mark the resolution of the dispute between the governing bodies. In a match-up of 1994 World Champions, Priestley defeated Part 3–0 in sets.

== Setbacks and bouncebacks ==
The World Matchplay was often considered as Priestley's 'bogey' event, as he has never won it despite reaching the final in the tournament's first three years. In the 1994 final, Priestley held a 7–3 in legs lead over Butler and was on course to victory, when the American alerted Priestley's attention to a distraction in the arena; Butler's intervention could have had an effect on Priestley, as Butler won eight of the next nine legs to lead 11–8, and Butler eventually won 16–12.

The following year, Priestley suffered the first of five PDC major final defeats to Taylor, losing 11–16 in legs. He reached the final of the 1996 Matchplay but lost to Peter Evison 14-16. Priestley also reached the semi-finals of the event in 1999, but lost 10–17 to eventual winner Rod Harrington, with Priestley missing a dart at double 18 during the match which would have given him a nine-dart finish and a £25,000 prize. In later years, Priestley contested some close Blackpool encounters with Taylor. His 13–15 loss to Taylor in the second round of the 2005 event was followed by a 13–16 loss to Taylor in the quarter-finals the following year, and his 2008 campaign came to an end courtesy of an 8–17 semi-final exit.

Though Priestley has won a number of non-televised ranking events over the years, Priestley was close to quitting darts in 2003, unhappy with his form over the previous couple of years and had problems with his eyesight. He returned to better form in 2005 following his World Matchplay epic against Taylor. That year he reached his first major semi-final in five years at the World Grand Prix in Dublin. Priestley repeated that feat the following year and ended 2006 with a top-three ranking behind Taylor and Colin Lloyd.

== Friendship and rivalry with Phil Taylor ==
Priestley is a friend of Phil Taylor, who described Priestley as a darting "soul-mate" in his autobiography. During the early years of the PDC, Priestley and Taylor had an agreement where they would share prize money won at events. The agreement eventually ended when the prize money grew to a level where the players could individually sustain a better living and this coincided with Priestley's sharp dip in form.

Taylor and Priestley first met in major competition in the 1990 World Masters. Taylor won that semi-final encounter en route to the title. Priestley quickly assumed the upper hand in their rivalry, as he defeated Taylor in the quarter-finals of the 1991 World Championship, where Priestley trailed 1–3 and survived two match darts against him in the fifth set, before coming back to win the match, hitting a 161 outshot in the final leg of the match to win 4–3 in sets. Priestley went on to win the 1991 World Championship.

Priestley defeated Taylor again later in the year in the 1991 British Matchplay final. Their early meetings in the WDC were also won by Priestley, who defeated Taylor in the quarter-finals of the very first WDC event, the 1992 Lada UK Masters, and in the final of the very first WDC World Championship in 1994, the latter seeing Priestley win by 6–1 in sets. Priestley also defeated Taylor in the Last 16 of the 1995 UK Matchplay, before Taylor beat Priestley in the 1995 World Matchplay final.

The peak of the Taylor/Priestley rivalry arguably came in the 1996 WDC World Championship Final. Although Taylor was a hot favourite after his 1995 successes of winning both the World Championship and the World Matchplay, the match was very evenly poised: Taylor was the defending champion and reigning World Matchplay champion, while Priestley was the former champion and reigning World Pairs champion. Both players had conceded only a handful of sets between them en route to the final and produced (statistically) the greatest World Final ever at the time: not only was Priestley's average of 101.48 a landmark, Taylor's winning average of 98.52 was also higher than any previous World Finalist. Taylor won 6–4 in sets.

In he 1997 WDC World Championship Final, a series of 180s took Priestley to an early 2–0 lead in sets before Taylor's took control. Trailing 2–4 in sets and 0–2 in legs, Priestley recovered to 2–2 in legs before clinching the set with a 160 checkout against the throw. Priestley found himself 0–2 down in the following set. Again he recovered to 2–2 before fractionally missing a 140 checkout for a similar escape, which would have made the match all square at 4–4. Taylor won that set to lead 5–3 in sets, and then won the next for a 6–3 win.

Although only one set 'against the throw' proved decisive in both the 1996 and 1997 WDC World Championship finals, the 1998 PDC World Championship final proved to be one-sided. Becoming the only duo to contest three successive World Finals, Taylor and Priestley were unable to produce another epic contest. This time Taylor won 6–0 in sets and lost just two legs in the whole match (3–0, 3–0, 3–0, 3–0, 3–2, 3–0). Taylor's win evidenced a cross-roads in their respective careers. While Priestley started getting some motivational problems and struggled to remain at the top of the PDC ranks.

Priestley bounced back to reach his sixth World Championship Final in 2000. An average of 98 gave him a 5–2 semi-final win over top seed Peter Manley, while Taylor blitzed into the final without losing a set. The form of both players subsequently dipped in the final, where – from 3–2 2–2 – Taylor pulled away to a 7–3 win.

The pair provided another epic contest in the early rounds of the 2004 World Championship. After Taylor took the opening 2 sets, Priestley won 7 of the next 10 legs before Taylor wrapped up a 4–1 win.

The pair met again in the last 16 of the following year's World Matchplay. Priestley took Taylor into sudden death, leading 13-12 before Taylor won the last three legs to win 15–13. This heralded something of a turning point in Priestley's career; since the 2000 world final, he had been through a barren patch. Following this, he rose far enough in the rankings to appear in the 2007 Premier League.

Priestley's last win against Taylor came in a non-televised ranking event in 2006. His last major victory over Taylor came in 1994.

Perhaps for this reason, Priestley was highly regarded by Sid Waddell who, in the documentary "the Power and the Glory" commented that "Priestley was the only one (in Darts) who could do anything with [Taylor]" between 1994 and 1998, while Bristow endorsed the 1996 WDC World Championship Final because "Priestley didn't drop from the 100 average he played against other players" when faced with Taylor.

The continuing closeness between the two players was evident when Taylor was close to tears after beating Priestley 8–0 in the 2009 Las Vegas Desert Classic.

== Later years ==
In January 2007, Priestley made his debut in the Premier League Darts. In the opening weeks, Priestley defeated Roland Scholten and Adrian Lewis, gained a draw against Taylor and had wins over Terry Jenkins, Colin Lloyd, and van Barneveld. Although Priestley failed to maintain that form, his good start proved sufficient to earn him a semi-final place. Once again, however, he went down to a loss (6–11 in legs) to eventual winner Taylor.

In February 2007, he won the UK Open South-West Regional tournament, beating James Wade in the final. Priestley's form dipped later in 2007, although this was greatly overshadowed by his battle with prostate cancer.

Priestley failed to qualify for the Grand Slam of Darts in 2009, but he did win the US Open.

Priestley exited the 2010 PDC World Championship in the first round after losing 3–2 to Kevin McDine. He exited the 2011 PDC World Championships in the second round of the tournament after losing 4–2 to Gary Anderson.

In the 2011 season, Priestley dropped out of the top 32 in the PDC Order of Merit meaning he would have to try to qualify for the World Championship via the PDPA Qualifying tournament and was narrowly beaten at the quarter-final stage 5–4 by Joe Cullen after letting slip a 4–0 lead in that match. This meant that Priestley would not be taking part in the World Championship for the first time in 20 years.

In 2012, Priestley qualified for the 2012 UK Open, where he lost in the fifth round to eventual winner Robert Thornton. He also qualified for his first European Tour Event, the Dutch Darts Masters, and was beaten 3–6 by Andy Smith in the first round. In November, Priestley reached the final of the Players Championship 17 in Crawley, where he was beaten 2–6 by Simon Whitlock, having defeated an in-form Michael van Gerwen 6–1 in the semi-finals, despite his opponent averaging 105. His run to the final and successive quarter-final defeats in the last two events secured his qualification for the World Championship in December through the ProTour Order of Merit. He played Ronnie Baxter in the first round and lost 1–3.

Priestley only entered a handful of events in 2013 and his best finish came in May at the third Players Championship where he lost 6–2 in the quarter-finals to Robert Thornton. Despite this, he still had a tour card for 2014, as he was world number 51 at the start of the season, inside the top 64.

At the start of 2015, Priestley announced that he had retired from professional darts, but would still do exhibitions.

== Personal life ==
Away from darts, Priestley is married and has four children, and two granddaughters. He is a football fan who supports Barnsley and Manchester United.

In November 2007, Priestley was diagnosed with prostate cancer and issued a statement through the PDC regarding his health. He was forced to withdraw from the John McEvoy Darts Classic in Ireland with pains in his abdomen having been diagnosed with the disease in the run up to the event. He had stated his thoughts were to undergo surgery at some point in early 2008, however, after losing 5–2 to Van Barneveld in the second round of the Grand Slam of Darts (despite averaging 103.5), he announced that he would be making arrangements to undergo surgery in the days following the event. This did not prevent him taking his place in the 2008 World Championship where he lost in the first round to Steve Maish.

After an extended period of treatment and recuperation, Priestley returned to the PDC circuit in May 2008. He quickly regained his form and reached the semi-finals of the US Open where he was beaten, once again, by Taylor. He also lost to Taylor again after a run to the semis of the 2008 World Matchplay.

== Awards and honours ==
In 2009, Priestley was only the third player to be awarded an induction into the PDC Hall of Fame, having maintained a place within the world's top players for nearly two decades.

== World Championship results ==
=== BDO ===
Priestley's BDO results are as follows:

- 1991: Winner (beat Eric Bristow 6–0)
- 1992: 2nd round (lost to Alan Warriner-Little 2–3)
- 1993: 2nd round (lost to Steve Beaton 1–3)

=== PDC ===
Priestley's PDC results are as follows:

- 1994: Winner (beat Phil Taylor 6–1)
- 1995: Group Stage (lost to John Lowe 0–3) & (beat Jocky Wilson 3–2)
- 1996: Runner-up (lost to Phil Taylor 4–6)
- 1997: Runner-up (lost to Phil Taylor 3–6)
- 1998: Runner-up (lost to Phil Taylor 0–6)
- 1999: 1st round (lost to John Ferrell 0–3)
- 2000: Runner-up (lost to Phil Taylor 3–7)
- 2001: 1st round (lost to Keith Deller 2–3)
- 2002: Quarter-finals (lost to Dave Askew 2–6)
- 2003: 2nd round (lost to Dennis Smith 1–4)
- 2004: 4th round (lost to Phil Taylor 1–4)
- 2005: 4th round (lost to Phil Taylor 0–4)
- 2006: 2nd round (lost to Adrian Lewis 2–4)
- 2007: 3rd round (lost to Andy Hamilton 1–4)
- 2008: 1st round (lost to Steve Maish 1–3)
- 2009: 3rd round (lost to Paul Nicholson 2–4)
- 2010: 1st round (lost to Kevin McDine 2–3)
- 2011: 2nd round (lost to Gary Anderson 2–4)
- 2013: 1st round (lost to Ronnie Baxter 1–3)

== Career finals ==
=== BDO major finals ===
Priestly's appeared in three BDO major finals and has won three titles.

Legend
World Championship (1–0)
Winmau World Masters (1–0)
British Matchplay (1–0)

Outcome	No.	Year	Championship	Opponent in the final	Score (Note: (l) = score in legs, (s) = score in sets.)
Winner	1.	1991	World Darts Championship	(England) Eric Bristow	6–0 (s)
Winner	2.	1991	British Matchplay	(England) Phil Taylor	5–2 (s)
Winner	3.	1992	Winmau World Masters	(England) Mike Gregory	3–2 (s)

=== PDC major finals: 8 (1 titles, 7 runners-up) ===
Legend
World Championship (1–4)
World Matchplay (0–3)

Outcome	No.	Year	Championship	Opponent in the final	Score
Winner	1.	1994	World Darts Championship	Phil Taylor	6–1 (s)
Runner-up	1.	1994	World Matchplay	Larry Butler	12–16 (l)
Runner-up	2.	1995	World Matchplay (2)	Phil Taylor	11–16 (l)
Runner-up	3.	1996	World Darts Championship	Phil Taylor	4–6 (s)
Runner-up	4.	1996	World Matchplay (3)	Peter Evison	14–16 (l)
Runner-up	5.	1997	World Darts Championship (2)	Phil Taylor	3–6 (s)
Runner-up	6.	1998	World Darts Championship (3)	Phil Taylor	0–6 (s)
Runner-up	7.	2000	World Darts Championship (4)	Phil Taylor	3–7 (s)

=== Independent major finals ===
Priestley has appeared in one independent major final and finished runner-up.

Outcome	No.	Year	Championship	Opponent in the final	Score
Runner-up	1.	1989	News of the World Championship	(England) Dave Whitcombe	1–2 (l)

== Performance timeline ==
Priestley's performance timeline is as follows:

BDO

Tournament	1989	1990	1991	1992	1993	1994–2006	2007
BDO World Championship	DNP		W	L16	L16	PDC	
Winmau World Masters	DNP	SF	L16	W	PDC		
World Darts Trophy	Not held					PDC	L16
International Darts League	Not held					PDC	RR
British Matchplay	DNP		W	DNP		Not held	
News of the World Darts Championship	RU	DNP	Not held				

PDC

Tournament	1994	1995	1996	1997	1998	1999	2000	2001	2002	2003	2004	2005	2006	2007	2008	2009	2010	2011	2012	2013
PDC World Championship	W	RR	RU	RU	RU	L32	RU	L32	QF	L32	L16	L16	L32	L16	L64	L16	L64	L32	DNQ	L64
Premier League Darts	Not held											DNP		SF	DNP					
UK Open	Not held									L16	L16	L64	L32	L16	L64	L16	L64	L32	L16	DNQ
Las Vegas Desert Classic	Not held								L16	RR	L16	DNQ	QF	L32	L16	L16	DNP			
US Open/WSoD	Not held												SF	L16	SF	DNP	Not held			
World Matchplay	RU	RU	RU	QF	L32	SF	L16	L16	L32	L32	L16	L16	QF	L16	SF	L32	L32	DNP		
World Grand Prix	Not held				QF	QF	SF	L32	L32	L16	L16	SF	SF	L32	QF	L16	L32	DNP		
Grand Slam of Darts	Not held													RR	DNQ					DNP
European Championship	Not held														L16	L32	L32	DNP		
Championship League Darts	Not held														RR	RR	RR	RR	DNP	
Players Championship Finals	Not held															QF	L32	L16	DNP	DNP

Performance Table Legend
W	Won the tournament	RU	Runner-up	SF	Semifinalist	QF	Quarterfinalist	#R; RR; L#	Lost in # round Round-robin; Last # stage	DQ	Disqualified
DNQ	Did not qualify	DNP	Did not participate	WD	Withdrew	NH	Tournament not held	#R; RR; L#	Lost in # round Round-robin; Last # stage	NYF	Not yet founded

Sporting positions
Preceded by Alan Warriner	WDC World Number One; 6 November 1994 – 10 April 1995	Succeeded by Rod Harrington
