= John Verwey =

Canadian darts player

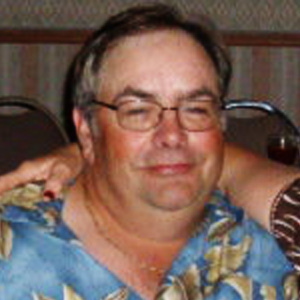
- John Verwey circa 2010

Personal information
- Nickname: "The Walrus"
- Born: 27 July 1957 (age 69) Toronto, Ontario, Canada
- Home town: Huron County, Ontario, Canada

Sport
- Sport: Darts
- Playing since: 1982
- Darts: 26 Gram
- Laterality: Right-handed
- Walk-on music: "Thunderstruck" by AC/DC

Organisation (see split in darts)
- BDO: 1996–2004, 2013–2015
- PDC: 2004–2009

WDF major events – best performances
- World Masters: Last 128: 1998

PDC premier events – best performances
- World Championship: Last 32: 2005

John Verwey (born 27 July 1957), nicknamed The Walrus, is a Canadian former professional darts player who played in Professional Darts Corporation (PDC) and British Darts Organisation (BDO) tournaments. During a 25-year career, he enjoyed numerous wins competing in his native Ontario, going on to represent the province at the national level on four occasions. In 2005, Verwey earned a spot in the PDC World Darts Championship where he lost in the third round to Colin Lloyd.

== Career ==
Verwey practiced darts throughout most of his youth, only turning professional in the mid-nineties. There he participated in the Canada National Championships. Primarily knownas a singles champion, John Verwey often forayed into the doubles scene alongside fellow darts player and spouse, Heather.

Verwey was defeated by Colin Lloyd in the 2005 World Darts Championship.

Verwey is currently unranked, and as such, receives no benefit of sponsorship as many professional darts players often do.

== Personal life ==
Verwey is a dual-ticketed millwright and electrician and currently operates a laboratory at the Bruce Nuclear Generating Station near Port Elgin. He maintains a sprawling farm estate in Auburn, Ontario, with his wife, three children and relatives.

== World Championship results ==
=== PDC ===
- 2005: Last 32 (lost to Colin Lloyd 1–4)
