= World Matchplay (darts) =

Professional darts tournament

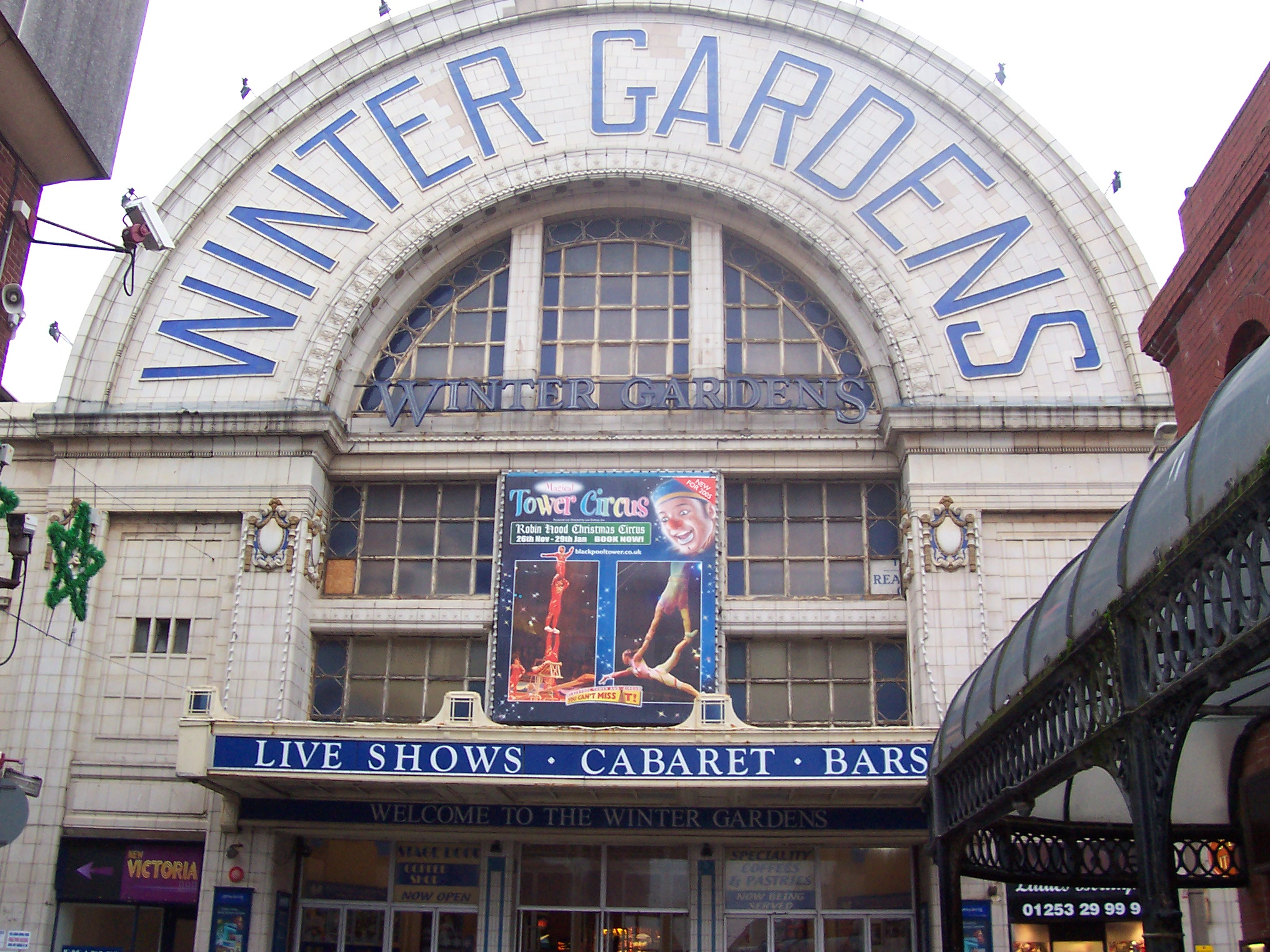
- The Winter Gardens in Blackpool, where the tournament has been held for every edition except 2020.
- Founded: 1994
- First season: 1994
- Country: England
- Venues: Winter Gardens (1994–2019, 2021–); Marshall Arena (2020)
- Most recent champion: (England) Luke Littler (2026)
- Tournament format: Legs

The World Matchplay, also known as the Betfred World Matchplay for sponsorship purposes, is a professional darts tournament and one of three legs of the Triple Crown. It is played in a legs format, and is run by the Professional Darts Corporation (PDC). Luke Littler is the current champion after winning the 2026 edition.

== History ==
The World Matchplay has been played annually since 1994 in the Empress Ballroom at the Winter Gardens, Blackpool. The first ever winner was Larry Butler, who beat Dennis Priestley 16–12, and the current holder is Luke Littler.

The 1995 World Matchplay turned out to be Jocky Wilson's last appearance in a major televised event. Wilson had reached the quarter-finals of the inaugural tournament in 1994 and he beat Rod Harrington in the 1st round in 1995, but a 2nd round defeat against Nigel Justice was effectively the end of his career.

From 1994 to 2012, matches at the World Matchplay had to be won by two clear legs. For example, the first round was usually played over the first to 10 legs, but if the score reached 9–9, play continued until either player gained a two-leg lead. Starting with the 2013 World Matchplay, if a two leg-lead hadn't been established after six extra legs, then a sudden death leg is played, so sudden death would come into play in a first round match at 12–12.

Over the course of the tournament's 33-year existence, there have been fourteen different winners: Phil Taylor (16), Michael van Gerwen (3), Rod Harrington (2), Luke Littler (2), Gary Anderson (1), Nathan Aspinall (1), Larry Butler (1), Rob Cross (1), Peter Evison (1), Luke Humphries (1), Colin Lloyd (1), Dimitri Van den Bergh (1), James Wade (1) and Peter Wright (1).

From 2018 onwards, the World Matchplay champion will receive the Phil Taylor Trophy, as was announced by the PDC following the retirement of the sixteen-time winner of the tournament.

Due to the COVID-19 pandemic in the United Kingdom, the 2020 World Matchplay was held at the Marshall Arena, Milton Keynes, behind closed doors.

== World Matchplay finals ==
Year	Champion (average in final)	Score	Runner-up (average in final)	Prize money			Sponsor	Venue
Year	Champion (average in final)	Score	Runner-up (average in final)	Total	Champion	Runner-up	Sponsor	Venue
1994	(United States) Larry Butler (92.70)	16–12	(England) Dennis Priestley (91.59)	£42,400	£10,000	£6,000	Proton Cars	Winter Gardens, Blackpool
1995	(England) Phil Taylor (90.72)	16–11	(England) Dennis Priestley (87.63)	£42,400	£10,000	£6,000	Webster's	Winter Gardens, Blackpool
1996	(England) Peter Evison (100.51)	16–14	(England) Dennis Priestley (96.67)	£46,000	£12,000	£7,000	Webster's	Winter Gardens, Blackpool
1997	(England) Phil Taylor (106.32)	16–11	(England) Alan Warriner (98.42)	£46,000	£12,000	£6,000	Webster's	Winter Gardens, Blackpool
1998	(England) Rod Harrington (95.03)	19–17	(England) Ronnie Baxter (94.07)	£58,000	£14,000	£7,000	PDC	Winter Gardens, Blackpool
1999	(England) Rod Harrington (85.95)	19–17	(England) Peter Manley (86.91)	£58,000	£14,000	£7,000	PDC	Winter Gardens, Blackpool
2000	(England) Phil Taylor (100.32)	18–12	(England) Alan Warriner (97.14)	£58,000	£14,000	£7,000	Stan James	Winter Gardens, Blackpool
2001	(England) Phil Taylor (99.57)	18–10	(Wales) Richie Burnett (90.99)	£65,000	£14,000	£7,000	Stan James	Winter Gardens, Blackpool
2002	(England) Phil Taylor (98.76)	18–16	(Canada) John Part (94.14)	£75,500	£15,000	£7,500	Stan James	Winter Gardens, Blackpool
2003	(England) Phil Taylor (94.38)	18–12	(England) Wayne Mardle (97.44)	£80,000	£15,000	£8,000	Stan James	Winter Gardens, Blackpool
2004	(England) Phil Taylor (100.20)	18–8	(England) Mark Dudbridge (89.24)	£100,000	£20,000	£10,000	Stan James	Winter Gardens, Blackpool
2005	(England) Colin Lloyd (97.89)	18–12	(Canada) John Part (94.53)	£120,000	£25,000	£12,500	Stan James	Winter Gardens, Blackpool
2006	(England) Phil Taylor (100.08)	18–11	(England) James Wade (90.01)	£150,000	£30,000	£15,000	Stan James	Winter Gardens, Blackpool
2007	(England) James Wade (96.83)	18–7	(England) Terry Jenkins (91.62)	£200,000	£50,000	£20,000	Stan James	Winter Gardens, Blackpool
2008	(England) Phil Taylor (109.47)	18–9	(England) James Wade (102.58)	£300,000	£60,000	£30,000	Stan James	Winter Gardens, Blackpool
2009	(England) Phil Taylor (106.05)	18–4	(England) Terry Jenkins (92.32)	£400,000	£100,000	£50,000	Stan James	Winter Gardens, Blackpool
2010	(England) Phil Taylor (105.16)	18–12	(Netherlands) Raymond van Barneveld (100.11)	£400,000	£100,000	£50,000	Stan James	Winter Gardens, Blackpool
2011	(England) Phil Taylor (103.84)	18–8	(England) James Wade (98.84)	£400,000	£100,000	£50,000	Sky Bet	Winter Gardens, Blackpool
2012	(England) Phil Taylor (98.97)	18–15	(England) James Wade (95.92)	£400,000	£100,000	£50,000	Betfair	Winter Gardens, Blackpool
2013	(England) Phil Taylor (111.23)	18–13	(England) Adrian Lewis (105.92)	£400,000	£100,000	£50,000	BetVictor	Winter Gardens, Blackpool
2014	(England) Phil Taylor (107.19)	18–9	(Netherlands) Michael van Gerwen (101.49)	£450,000	£100,000	£50,000	BetVictor	Winter Gardens, Blackpool
2015	(Netherlands) Michael van Gerwen (99.91)	18–12	(England) James Wade (90.37)	£450,000	£100,000	£50,000	BetVictor	Winter Gardens, Blackpool
2016	(Netherlands) Michael van Gerwen (103.93)	18–10	(England) Phil Taylor (101.13)	£450,000	£100,000	£50,000	BetVictor	Winter Gardens, Blackpool
2017	(England) Phil Taylor (104.24)	18–8	(Scotland) Peter Wright (99.74)	£500,000	£115,000	£55,000	BetVictor	Winter Gardens, Blackpool
2018	(Scotland) Gary Anderson (101.12)	21–19	(Austria) Mensur Suljović (104.43)	£500,000	£115,000	£55,000	BetVictor	Winter Gardens, Blackpool
2019	(England) Rob Cross (95.16)	18–13	(England) Michael Smith (95.91)	£700,000	£150,000	£70,000	Betfred	Winter Gardens, Blackpool
2020	(Belgium) Dimitri Van den Bergh (98.31)	18–10	(Scotland) Gary Anderson (92.81)	£700,000	£150,000	£70,000	Betfred	Marshall Arena, Milton Keynes
2021	(Scotland) Peter Wright (105.90)	18–9	(Belgium) Dimitri Van den Bergh (100.88)	£700,000	£150,000	£70,000	Betfred	Winter Gardens, Blackpool
2022	(Netherlands) Michael van Gerwen (101.19)	18–14	(Wales) Gerwyn Price (96.92)	£800,000	£200,000	£100,000	Betfred	Winter Gardens, Blackpool
2023	(England) Nathan Aspinall (96.21)	18–6	(Wales) Jonny Clayton (93.56)	£800,000	£200,000	£100,000	Betfred	Winter Gardens, Blackpool
2024	(England) Luke Humphries (100.94)	18–15	(Netherlands) Michael van Gerwen (98.74)	£800,000	£200,000	£100,000	Betfred	Winter Gardens, Blackpool
2025	(England) Luke Littler (107.24)	18–13	(England) James Wade (101.54)	£800,000	£200,000	£100,000	Betfred	Winter Gardens, Blackpool
2026	(England) Luke Littler (111.53)	18–9	(Wales) Gerwyn Price (104.97)	£1,000,000	£225,000	£125,000	Betfred	Winter Gardens, Blackpool

== Records and statistics ==
As of 26 July 2026.

=== Total finalist appearances ===
Rank	Player	Nationality	Won	Runner-up	Finals	Appearances
1	Phil Taylor	England	16	1	17	24
2	**Michael van Gerwen**	Netherlands	3	2	5	18
3	Rod Harrington	England	2	0	2	9
3	**Luke Littler**	England	2	0	2	3
5	**James Wade**	England	1	6	7	21
6	**Gary Anderson**	Scotland	1	1	2	18
6	**Dimitri Van den Bergh**	Belgium	1	1	2	5
6	**Peter Wright**	Scotland	1	1	2	15
9	Larry Butler	United States	1	0	1	3
9	Peter Evison	England	1	0	1	11
9	Colin Lloyd	England	1	0	1	15
9	**Rob Cross**	England	1	0	1	10
9	**Nathan Aspinall**	England	1	0	1	8
9	**Luke Humphries**	England	1	0	1	6
15	Dennis Priestley	England	0	3	3	17
16	Alan Warriner	England	0	2	2	14
16	John Part	Canada	0	2	2	15
16	Terry Jenkins	England	0	2	2	13
16	**Gerwyn Price**	Wales	0	2	2	11
20	Ronnie Baxter	England	0	1	1	17
20	Peter Manley	England	0	1	1	13
20	**Richie Burnett**	Wales	0	1	1	9
20	Wayne Mardle	England	0	1	1	7
20	Mark Dudbridge	England	0	1	1	8
20	**Raymond van Barneveld**	Netherlands	0	1	1	15
20	**Adrian Lewis**	England	0	1	1	17
20	**Mensur Suljović**	Austria	0	1	1	7
20	**Michael Smith**	England	0	1	1	12
20	**Jonny Clayton**	Wales	0	1	1	9

- Active players are shown in **bold**
- Only players who reached the final are included
- In the event of identical records, players are sorted by date first achieved

=== Champions by country ===
Country	Players	Total	First title	Last title
England	9	26	1995	2026
Netherlands	1	3	2015	2022
Scotland	2	2	2018	2021
United States	1	1	1994	1994
Belgium	1	1	2020	2020

=== Nine-dart finishes ===
Eleven nine-dart finishes have been thrown at the World Matchplay. The first one was in 2002, when Phil Taylor hit the first live 9-darter in UK television history.

Player	Year (+ Round)	Method	Opponent	Result
(England) Phil Taylor	2002, Quarter-Finals	3 x T20; 3 x T20; T20, T19, D12	(England) Chris Mason	Won
(Netherlands) Raymond van Barneveld	2010, 1st Round	3 x T20; 3 x T20; T20, T19, D12	(England) Denis Ovens	Won
(Canada) John Part	2011, 1st Round	3 x T20; 3 x T20; T20, T19, D12	(Wales) Mark Webster	Lost
(Netherlands) Michael van Gerwen	2012, 2nd Round	3 x T20; 3 x T20; T20, T19, D12	(England) Steve Beaton	Won
(England) Wes Newton	2012, 2nd Round	3 x T20; 2 x T20, T19; 2 x T20, D12	(England) Justin Pipe	Lost
(England) Phil Taylor	2014, 2nd Round	3 x T20; 2 x T20, T19; 2 x T20, D12	(England) Michael Smith	Won
(Scotland) Gary Anderson	2018, Quarter-Finals	3 x T20; 3 x T20; T20, T19, D12	(England) Joe Cullen	Won
(Wales) Gerwyn Price	2022, Semi-Finals	3 x T20; 3 x T20; T19, T20, D12	(Netherlands) Danny Noppert	Won
(Belgium) Dimitri Van den Bergh	2024, 1st Round	3 x T20; 3 x T20; T19, T20, D12	(Germany) Martin Schindler	Won
(England) Luke Littler	2025, Semi-Finals	3 x T20; 3 x T20; T20, T17, D15	(Northern Ireland) Josh Rock	Won
(England) Luke Littler	2026, 2nd Round	3 x T20; 3 x T20; T20, T17, D15	(England) Nathan Aspinall	Won

=== Tournament records ===
A match in progress on the World Matchplay stage.

Longest match in Matchplay history
The 2018 final went to 40 legs as a result of the format of "2 clear legs".
Longest unbeaten run
Phil Taylor from 2008 to 2015: Won 38 matches in a row. Taylor only lost eight matches in the history of the event:

- 1994 Bob Anderson 9–11 (tiebreak, second round)
- 1996 Peter Evison 1–8 (second round)
- 1998 Ronnie Baxter 10–13 (quarter-finals)
- 1999 Peter Manley 14–17 (semi-finals)
- 2005 John Part 11–16 (quarter-finals)
- 2007 Terry Jenkins 11–17 (semi-finals)
- 2015 James Wade 14–17 (semi-finals)
- 2016 Michael van Gerwen 10–18 (Final)

=== Averages ===
In 2010, Phil Taylor became the first player to average over 100 in all five rounds of the tournament. He repeated this feat in 2011 and 2013. Luke Littler achieved this feat at the 2026 World Matchplay.

An average of over 105 in a match in the World Matchplay has been achieved 37 times, of which Phil Taylor is responsible for 24. The highest match average ever in the World Matchplay is 114.99 by Phil Taylor in his Last 32 victory over Barrie Bates in 2010. The highest match average ever in the World Matchplay Final is 111.53 by Luke Littler against Gerwyn Price in 2026.

Ten highest PDC World Matchplay one-match averages
Average	Player	Year (+ Round)	Opponent	Result
114.99	(England) Phil Taylor	2010, Last 32	(Wales) Barrie Bates	10–6
113.68	(England) Luke Littler	2026, Last 16	(England) Nathan Aspinall	11–8
113.43	(England) Phil Taylor	1997, Last 32	(Canada) Gary Mawson	8–0
112.17	(England) Phil Taylor	2002, Quarter-Final	(England) Chris Mason	16–7
111.53	(England) Luke Littler	2026, Final	(Wales) Gerwyn Price	18–9
111.23	(England) Phil Taylor	2013, Final	(England) Adrian Lewis	18–13
110.93	(Netherlands) Michael van Gerwen	2015, Last 16	(Wales) Jamie Lewis	13–2
110.88	(England) Luke Littler	2026, Semi-Final	(Netherlands) Dirk van Duijvenbode	17–5
110.51	(England) Adrian Lewis	2014, Last 32	(England) Andrew Gilding	10–0
110.37	(Scotland) Peter Wright	2021, Semi-Final	(Netherlands) Michael van Gerwen	17–10

Five highest losing averages
Average	Player	Year (+ Round)	Opponent	Result
105.92	(England) Adrian Lewis	2013, Final	(England) Phil Taylor	13–18
105.68	(Scotland) Gary Anderson	2014, Semi-Final	(England) Phil Taylor	15–17
105.17	(Scotland) Gary Anderson	2017, Last 16	(Northern Ireland) Daryl Gurney	9–11
104.97	(Wales) Gerwyn Price	2026, Final	(England) Luke Littler	9–18
104.57	(Scotland) Peter Wright	2019, Quarter-Final	(Northern Ireland) Daryl Gurney	13–16

Different players with a 100+ match average (Updated 26/07/26)
Player	Total	Highest Av.	Year (+ Round)
(England) Phil Taylor	62	114.99	2010, Last 32
(Netherlands) Michael van Gerwen	20	110.93	2015, Last 16
(Scotland) Peter Wright	15	110.37	2021, Semi-Final
(Scotland) Gary Anderson	13	109.96	2026, Last 32
(England) James Wade	11	104.44	2025, Last 32
(England) Luke Littler	10	113.68	2026, Last 16
(England) Adrian Lewis	9	110.51	2014, Last 32
(Wales) Gerwyn Price	9	108.73	2025, Last 16
(England) Luke Humphries	7	108.76	2024, Last 32
(England) Rob Cross	7	106.99	2024, Last 16
(Belgium) Dimitri Van den Bergh	6	103.68	2021, Last 16
Josh Rock	4	104.32	2025, Last 32
(England) Michael Smith	4	102.08	2024, Last 32
(England) Nathan Aspinall	3	105.32	2026, Last 32
(England) Ryan Searle	3	105.19	2023, Last 32
(Northern Ireland) Daryl Gurney	3	104.43	2023, Last 16
(Netherlands) Raymond van Barneveld	3	103.86	2010, Last 16
(Wales) Jonny Clayton	3	101.90	2023, Last 16
(England) Mervyn King	3	101.06	2014, Last 32
(Poland) Krzysztof Ratajski	2	107.53	2020, Last 32
(England) Glen Durrant	2	106.93	2020, Last 32
(Austria) Mensur Suljović	2	104.43	2018, Final
(England) Peter Evison	2	103.77	1996, Last 16
(Netherlands) Dirk van Duijvenbode	2	103.61	2022, Last 32
(England) Ian White	2	103.51	2015, Last 32
(England) Dave Chisnall	2	103.02	2018, Last 16
(England) Stephen Bunting	2	102.48	2016, Last 32
(Netherlands) Danny Noppert	2	102.36	2022, Last 16
(England) Andrew Gilding	2	101.82	2025, Last 32
(England) Steve Beaton	2	100.98	2011, Last 32
(Australia) Damon Heta	2	100.93	2024, Last 32
(England) Joe Cullen	2	100.67	2023, Last 32
(Netherlands) Kevin Doets	1	104.19	2026, Last 32
(Germany) Martin Schindler	1	103.45	2025, Last 32
(Portugal) José de Sousa	1	103.26	2022, Last 16
(Netherlands) Jeffrey de Zwaan	1	103.22	2018, Quarter-Final
(England) Colin Lloyd	1	102.57	2005, Last 16
(England) Shayne Burgess	1	102.03	1999, Last 16
(England) Andy Hamilton	1	101.88	2006, Semi-Final
(Netherlands) Wessel Nijman	1	101.72	2025, Last 32
(England) Alan Warriner-Little	1	101.55	1997, Quarter-Final
(Scotland) John Henderson	1	101.33	2019, Last 32
(Spain) Cristo Reyes	1	101.29	2017, Last 32
(England) Rod Harrington	1	101.22	1997, Last 32
(England) Jamie Hughes	1	101.13	2020, Last 32
(England) Kevin Painter	1	101.01	2009, Last 32
(Netherlands) Gian van Veen	1	100.81	2024, Last 32
(Germany) Ricardo Pietreczko	1	100.74	2024, Last 32
(England) Ross Smith	1	100.55	2026, Last 32
(England) Mark Walsh	1	100.41	2008, Last 32

Five highest tournament averages
Average	Player	Year
111.04	(England) Luke Littler	2026
106.31	(England) Phil Taylor	2010
105.81	(England) Phil Taylor	2013
105.73	(England) Phil Taylor	2009
105.50	(England) Phil Taylor	2011

== Format ==
From the beginning of the tournament in 1994, the World Matchplay has always been a legs only event. The length of matches for each round has changed several times over the years, with the table below showing how many legs needed to win.

Year	Round 1	Round 2	Quarters	Semis	Final	Notes
1994	8	8	11	11	16	Must win by 2 clear legs
1995–1996	8	8	11	13	16	Must win by 2 clear legs
1997	8	8	11	13	16	Preliminary round: First to 6 legs All rounds: Must win by 2 clear legs
1998	8	8	13	13	18	Must win by 2 clear legs
1999–2012	10	13	16	17	18	Must win by 2 clear legs
2013–2015	10	13	16	17	18	Must win by 2 clear legs Sudden death after 6 extra legs
2016–present	10	11	16	17	18	Must win by 2 clear legs Sudden death after 6 extra legs

== Women's World Matchplay ==
Since 2022, the PDC have held a Women's event on the Sunday afternoon before the main event final. The winner qualifies for the World Championship and the Grand Slam of Darts.

Year	Winner (average in final)	Score	Runner-up (average in final)	Prize money			Venue
Year	Winner (average in final)	Score	Runner-up (average in final)	Total	Winner	Runner-up	Venue
2022	Fallon Sherrock (82.41)	6–3	Aileen de Graaf (76.30)	£25,000	£10,000	£5,000	Winter Gardens, Blackpool
2023	Beau Greaves (79.85)	6–1	Mikuru Suzuki (72.12)	£25,000	£10,000	£5,000	Winter Gardens, Blackpool
2024	Beau Greaves (98.75)	6–3	Fallon Sherrock (87.60)	£25,000	£10,000	£5,000	Winter Gardens, Blackpool
2025	Lisa Ashton (85.49)	6–5	Fallon Sherrock (89.61)	£25,000	£10,000	£5,000	Winter Gardens, Blackpool
2026	Beau Greaves (88.63)	6–5	Fallon Sherrock (87.84)	£40,000	£15,000	£8,000	Winter Gardens, Blackpool

== Media coverage ==
The World Matchplay has been broadcast in the UK by Sky Sports since the first tournament.
