= Mick Manning (darts player) =

English darts player

Personal information
- Full name: Michael Manning
- Born: 4 October 1962 (age 64) London, England

Sport
- Sport: Darts
- Darts: 22g Eric Bristow
- Laterality: Right-handed

Organisation (see split in darts)
- BDO: 1987–1992
- PDC: 1994–2005

PDC premier events – best performances
- World Championship: Last 16: 1999
- World Matchplay: Last 16: 1996, 1997, 1998, 1999, 2000
- World Grand Prix: Last 16: 1998, 2000, 2001
- UK Open: Last 32: 2005

Other tournament wins
- Years
Isle of Man Open	1994
Las Vegas Open	2002
Soft Tip Bullshooter World Championship	1998, 2004

Michael John Manning (born 4 October 1962) is an English former professional darts player who competed in British Darts Organisation (BDO) and Professional Darts Corporation (PDC) events.

== Career ==
Mick Manning broke through into the televised darts scene in 1988, making a surprise semi-final appearance in the BDO British Open, defeating Keith Deller before losing to eventual winner John Lowe. Manning followed that with another deep televised tournament run, achieving the runner-up spot in the Dry Blackthorn Cider Masters, beating then-World Champion Bob Anderson along the way.

He was unable to sustain that early momentum, however, and despite spending many years in the BDO system, he was unable to qualify for the World Championship. Following the 1993 split in darts, Manning would win one BDO event, the 1994 Isle Of Man Open, before switching to the PDC.

His PDC career began in 1994's World Matchplay, exiting in the first round to Bob Anderson. He would repeat the same result the following year, this time losing to Dennis Priestley. He would fare better in 1996, starting in the preliminary round of the Matchplay before winning through to the last 16 by virtue of wins over Garry Haynes and Paul Bratherton. A walkover victory over Raymond Van Barneveld (who did not appear to play in the tournament due to the ongoing split in darts) the next year led to another last 16 finish, with Manning defeating Harry Robinson before falling to Phil Taylor. In all, he would participate in the Matchplay on eleven occasions (reaching the last 16 five times), with the run ending at the conclusion of his professional career in 2005.

He would finally compete in his first PDC World Championship in 1998, going out in the group stages. He would return for the next seven years, although he rarely progressed beyond the first round, except in 1999, where he lost in the last 16 to Dennis Smith. He also made three appearances at the World Grand Prix in 1998, 2000 and 2001, but again found the last sixteen to be his ceiling. He did, however, achieve better success in non-televised tournaments, at one point ranking in the world's top ten. His most prominent results were winning the Las Vegas Open in 2002 and reaching the final of 2003's Antwerp Open.

Manning's last major televised events in the PDC were 2005's Matchplay and the UK Open, reaching the last 32 in both, although he would continue to play the occasional tour event in the early 2000s. He retired from the PDC in 2005 as an active player after failing to qualify for that year's World Championship, although he did find time to serve on the board of both the Professional Darts Players Association and the Darts Regulation Authority until 2006.

Outside of the PDC, Manning did find some success in soft-tip darts, winning the Soft Tip Bullshooter World Championship on two occasions in 1998 and 2004.

== World Championship performances ==
=== PDC ===
- 1998: Last 24 Group: (lost to Graeme Stoddart 0–3) & (beat to Keith Deller 3–2)
- 1999: Last 16: (lost to Dennis Smith 1–3)
- 2000: Last 32: (lost to Phil Taylor 0–3)
- 2001: Last 32: (lost to Dave Askew 2–3)
- 2002: Last 32: (lost to John Part 2–4)
- 2003: Last 32: (lost to Ronnie Baxter 1–4)
- 2004: Last 40: (lost to Wayne Atwood 0–3)
- 2005: Last 40: (lost to Andy Hamilton 0–3)
