= Stan James =

Online gambling company

SJU Limited
- Company type: Ltd
- Industry: Gambling
- Founded: 1973
- Headquarters: Marina Bay, Gibraltar
- Products: Bookmaking, online casino, online poker, betting shops, online gambling

StanJames.com was a remote gambling operator offering online, on mobile and telephone sports betting, Casino, Games and Poker. It was a significant part of the Stan James brand which began life in 1973 as a single betting shop in Wantage, Oxfordshire. In the forty years since, the brand had grown to become one of the most trusted names in UK betting and gaming.

== History ==
The Stan James brand began life in 1973 as a single betting shop in Wantage, Oxfordshire. The company was founded by Steve Fisher and James Holder, and is now owned by Unibet Group plc. The company was named 'Stan James' by taking the first two letters of Steve and his wife, Anne (Stan), and from James. Nowadays, the Stan James operations are primarily online and on mobile though there is a shop estate of over 90 betting shops in the UK. Stan James opened their first shop in Compton, Berkshire in 1973.

StanJames.com was the trading name of SJU Limited and was licensed and regulated by the Government of Gibraltar and the Gambling Commission of Great Britain. The company's online gambling operations are located in Gibraltar. The CEO of StanJames.com was Denis Kelly. The StanJames.com brand was available in markets across the world, with sports and casino customers from over 120 countries worldwide, but they focused in particular on the UK market and UK customers.

In December 2007, the firm bought the Betdirect bookmaking company, which was established in 1998, from 32Red for £5.75 million. The Betdirect operation was merged with Stan James in February 2009. In 2008, they bought the online betting business betterbet.com from the London bookmaker Better. In 2009 Stan James started a co-operation with the Austrian BETKICK Sportwettenservice GmbH, together they found the brand SJBET and SJBET24.com (Internet betting) especially for betting shops in Austria, Germany, and Europe. In May 2010 they bought 27 branches of regional bookmaker Pagebet after the company went bankrupt. In September 2015, Unibet Group plc acquired the online gambling business of Stan James Group plc together with full rights and assets for £19 million.

On 26 February 2018 the Stan James website was shut down. All accounts were transferred to Kindred Group (formerly Unibet).

== Partnerships ==
StanJames.com had been present in several emerging markets where they had operated under alternative brands in partnership with local companies. These included 'Goldenpark.com' in Spain, where StanJames.com partnered with the Spanish land-based casino Group MGA; 'Racing2Day' in the United States, where they were part of a limited partnership licensed by the Oregon Racing Commission; and 'Betpack' in Ireland, which was created in 2009 to offer online betting and gaming to the betting shop network of the same name.

== Sports sponsorships ==
StanJames.com had been involved in numerous marketing campaigns since the online business was conceived in the late 1990s, including the Stan James World Matchplay from 2000 to 2010, during which time the event grew in size and stature to become the second most important event in darts.

StanJames.com had been notable supporters of British horse racing. The company sponsored the 'Stan James Guineas Festival' at Newmarket Racecourse from 2006 to 2010, and the King George Chase at Kempton Park from 2005 to 2008. Presently, StanJames.com sponsor 'Stan James Champion Hurdle' at the Cheltenham Festival. The Stan James Champion Hurdle is the final race in the 'Road To Cheltenham' series of races, all of which are sponsored by StanJames.com and had been since 2010. Since the six-race sponsorship began, Cheltenham Racecourse footfall and television viewer ratings had increased year-on-year for the Stan James Champion Hurdle.

== Marketing campaigns ==
In 2012, StanJames.com launched the 'Who are you with?' advertising campaign. The campaign revolved around two characters called Stan and James who are best friends but completely opposite characters, notably when it comes to having a bet. The campaign's strapline is 'Who are you with?', which was intended to provoke customers to align themselves with either Stan or James, as well as making the suggestion they should join StanJames.com.
