= 2026 PDC World Masters =

2026 Winmau World Masters

Tournament information
- Dates: 29 January – 1 February 2026 (Main tournament)
- Venue: Arena MK
- Location: Milton Keynes, England
- Organisation(s): Professional Darts Corporation (PDC)
- Format: Sets (best of 3 legs); Final – first to 6 sets
- Prize fund: £500,000
- Winner's share: £100,000
- Nine-dart finish: Luke Humphries
- High checkout: 161; Jonny Clayton Gerwyn Price

Champion(s)
- Luke Littler (ENG)

The 2026 PDC World Masters (known for sponsorship reasons as the 2026 Winmau World Masters) was a professional darts tournament that was held from 29 January to 1 February 2026 at Arena MK in Milton Keynes, England. The preliminary rounds of the tournament were held at Arena MK on 28 January 2026. Organised by the Professional Darts Corporation (PDC), it was the second edition of the PDC World Masters, previously called the Masters, since the event's rebrand in 2025. The winner received £100,000 from a total prize fund of £500,000.

The main tournament featured a 32-player field. The top 24 players on the PDC Order of Merit following the 2026 PDC World Championship automatically qualified for the main tournament. They were joined by eight qualifiers who advanced from the preliminary rounds, which featured players from outside of the top 24 and players from the PDC's affiliated tours. Two-time world champion Peter Wright failed to qualify for the tournament for the first time, while Gian van Veen reached the semi-finals in his World Masters debut.

Luke Humphries was the defending champion, having defeated Jonny Clayton 6–5 in the 2025 final. Humphries reached his second successive final, where he was defeated 6–5 by Luke Littler, who won his first World Masters title. Littler survived match darts against Mike De Decker and Gerwyn Price during his campaign.

Humphries hit a nine-dart finish during his second-round victory over Luke Woodhouse.

== Overview ==
=== Background ===
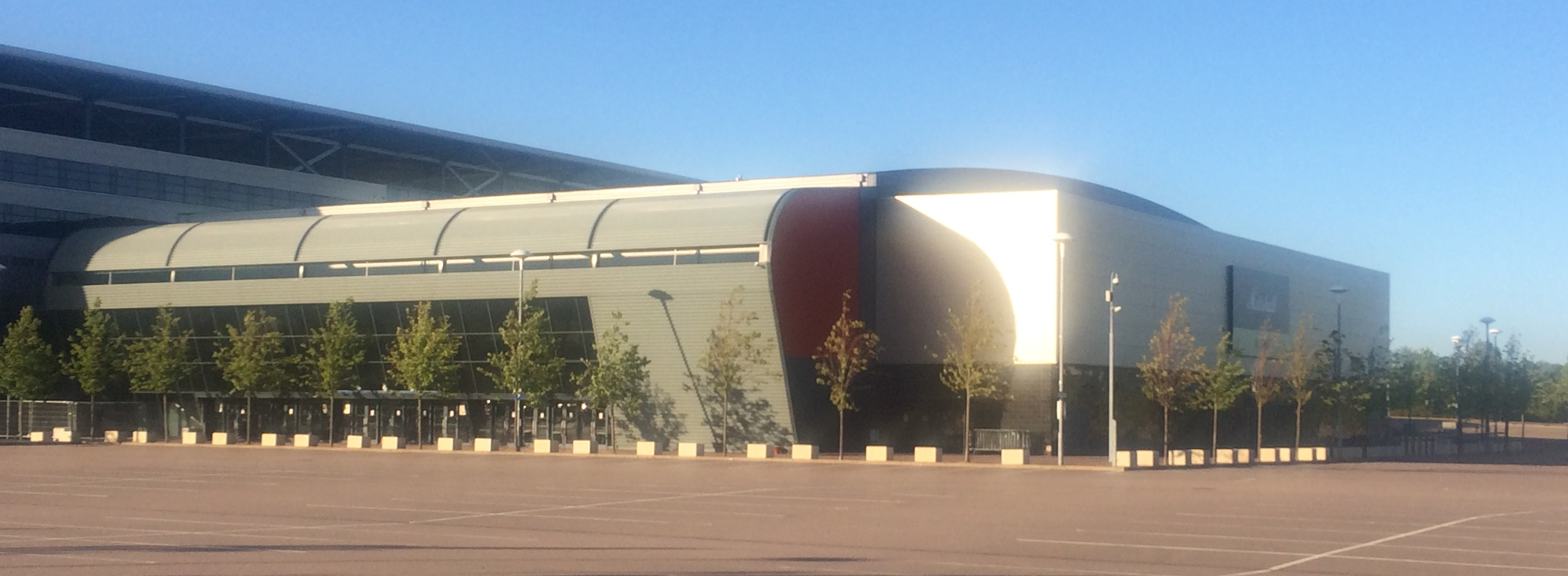
The preliminary rounds and main tournament were held at Arena MK in Milton Keynes, England.

The inaugural edition of the Masters, the 2013 Masters, was staged by the Professional Darts Corporation (PDC) from 1 to 3 November 2013 at the Royal Highland Centre in Edinburgh, Scotland. Phil Taylor won the first final, defeating Adrian Lewis 10–1. Since 2015, the tournament has been held in Milton Keynes, England. The tournament initially featured the top 16 players in the world before increasing to the top 24 in 2021.

In August 2024, it was announced that the field would expand to 32 players and the Masters would become a ranked event, starting from the 2025 edition. This preceded a bigger announcement that was made on 28 October 2024. The PDC announced a complete revamp of the competition, rebranding it from the Masters to the World Masters, emulating the World Masters which was first held in 1975 and organised by the British Darts Organisation and later the World Darts Federation. The revamp saw a change in format from leg play to set play, and saw preliminary rounds introduced to determine the eight qualifiers who would join the top 24 players on the PDC Order of Merit in the main competition.

Sponsored by darts manufacturer Winmau, the 2026 PDC World Masters was held from 29 January to 1 February 2026, preceded by the preliminary rounds held on 28 January; all matches were held at Arena MK in Milton Keynes. Luke Humphries entered the tournament as defending champion, having defeated Jonny Clayton 6–5 in the 2025 final.

=== Format ===
The top 16 players on the PDC Order of Merit were seeded for the first round and were drawn against the remaining 16 participants. All matches were played in traditional World Masters set format, where all sets are played to the best of three legs. The number of sets required to win increased as the tournament progressed.

Round	Best of (sets)	First to (sets)
Preliminary	5	3
First	5	3
Second	7	4
Quarter-finals	7	4
Semi-finals	9	5
Final	11	6

=== Prize money ===
The total prize fund for the tournament was £500,000. The winner's prize money was £100,000.

Position (no. of players)		Prize money (Total: £500,000)
Winner	(1)	£100,000
Runner-up	(1)	£50,000
Semi-finalists	(2)	£30,000
Quarter-finalists	(4)	£17,500
Second round losers	(8)	£10,000
First round losers	(16)	£5,000
Preliminary round Last 16 losers	(8)	£2,500
Preliminary round Last 32 losers	(16)	£1,000
Preliminary round Last 64 losers	(32)	£750

=== Broadcasts ===
The tournament was broadcast on ITV4 and ITVX in the United Kingdom. Other broadcasters included Viaplay in the Netherlands and the Nordic countries; DAZN in Germany, Austria and Switzerland; Fox Sports in Australia; Sky Sport in New Zealand; VTM in Belgium; Nova in Czechia and Slovakia; FanDuel TV Extra in the United States and Canada; AMC Network in Hungary; Zonasport in Croatia; TV3 in the Baltic states; Arena Sport in Serbia, Bosnia and Herzegovina, Montenegro, North Macedonia and Kosovo; and Eurasian Broadcasting in Armenia, Azerbaijan, Belarus, Georgia, Kazakhstan, Kyrgyzstan, Moldova, Tajikistan, Turkmenistan and Uzbekistan. It was also available for subscribers outside of Germany, Austria and Switzerland on the PDC's streaming service, PDCTV.

== Qualifiers ==
The top 24 players on the PDC Order of Merit following the 2026 World Championship automatically qualified for the main tournament, with the 16 highest-ranked players being seeds. They were joined by eight qualifiers from the preliminary rounds to complete a 32-player field.

Two-time world champion Peter Wright, who won the 2020 Masters, failed to reach the main tournament for the first time. Other notable players to be eliminated in the preliminary rounds were the 2023 world champion Michael Smith, 2022 Masters champion Joe Cullen, and 2025 World Masters semi-finalist Dimitri Van den Bergh.

Seeded players

1. Luke Littler (ENG) (champion)
2. Luke Humphries (ENG) (runner-up)
3. Gian van Veen (NED) (semi-finals)
4. Michael van Gerwen (NED) (first round)
5. Jonny Clayton (WAL) (second round)
6. Gary Anderson (SCO) (second round)
7. Stephen Bunting (ENG) (second round)
8. Ryan Searle (ENG) (first round)
9. Josh Rock (NIR) (quarter-finals)
10. Danny Noppert (NED) (quarter-finals)
11. James Wade (ENG) (quarter-finals)
12. Gerwyn Price (WAL) (semi-finals)
13. Chris Dobey (ENG) (quarter-finals)
14. Nathan Aspinall (ENG) (second round)
15. Martin Schindler (GER) (first round)
16. Ross Smith (ENG) (second round)

Order of Merit qualifiers

- Damon Heta (AUS) (second round)
- Jermaine Wattimena (NED) (first round)
- Mike De Decker (BEL) (first round)
- Rob Cross (ENG) (second round)
- Luke Woodhouse (ENG) (second round)
- Dave Chisnall (ENG) (first round)
- Daryl Gurney (NIR) (first round)
- Ryan Joyce (ENG) (first round)

Preliminary rounds qualifiers

- Niels Zonneveld (NED) (first round)
- Jeffrey de Graaf (SWE) (first round)
- Madars Razma (LAT) (first round)
- Wessel Nijman (NED) (first round)
- Shane McGuirk (IRL) (first round)
- Connor Scutt (ENG) (first round)
- Jimmy van Schie (NED) (first round)
- James Hurrell (ENG) (first round)

== Summary ==
=== Preliminary rounds ===
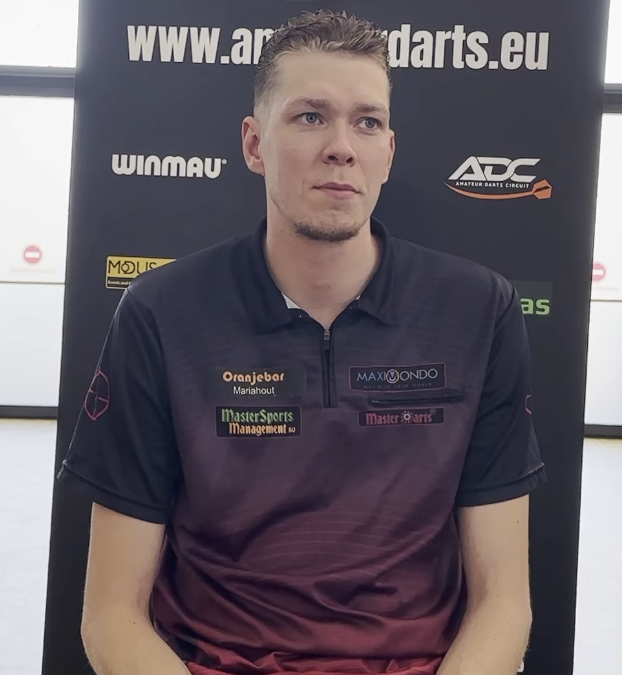
Jimmy van Schie, the reigning WDF world champion, advanced to the main tournament through the preliminary rounds.

The preliminary rounds (best of five sets) took place on 28 January. The field for the preliminary rounds comprised all PDC Tour Card holders ranked outside of the top 24, invited players from each of the PDC's secondary tours and Global Affiliate Tours, and four representatives from the Junior Darts Corporation (JDC). Eight players from the preliminary rounds qualified for the main tournament.

Jimmy van Schie, the reigning WDF world champion, progressed to the main competition in his first tournament as a PDC Tour Card holder, having transitioned to the PDC by earning a Tour Card at 2026 Q-School. He defeated Ritchie Edhouse and Richard Veenstra in the knockout stage before beating Scott Williams 3–1 to advance. Fellow tour newcomer Shane McGuirk, the 2024 WDF world champion, also reached the main tournament. Compatriots Wessel Nijman and Niels Zonneveld joined Van Schie to complete the trio of Dutch players to advance from the preliminary rounds, defeating Gabriel Clemens and Kim Huybrechts in their respective final matches. James Hurrell recorded a three-dart average of 111.33 in his 3–0 win over the 2022 Masters champion Joe Cullen, before beating Alan Soutar 3–1 to qualify. Jeffrey de Graaf reached the main tournament with successive 3–0 victories against Wesley Plaisier, Rhys Griffin and Jack Tweddell. Madars Razma defeated Krzysztof Ratajski 3–1 to earn his place, while Connor Scutt also advanced by beating Graham Hall by the same scoreline. Jamai van den Herik hit a nine-dart finish during his loss to Dominik Grüllich in the group stage.

=== First round ===
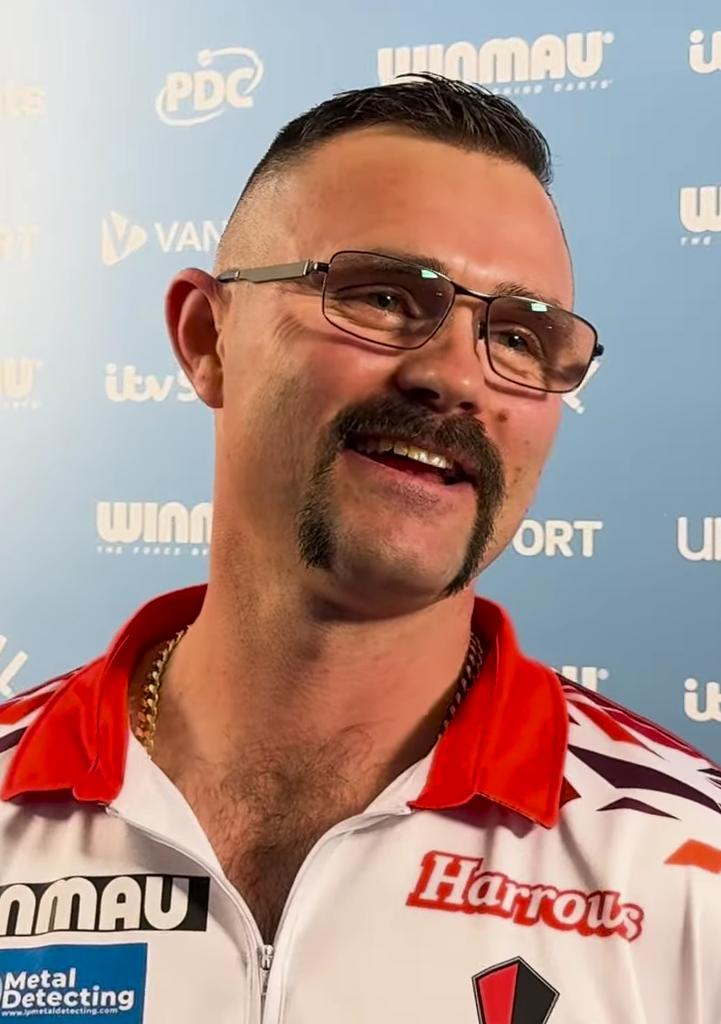
Damon Heta (pictured in 2025) eliminated five-time champion Michael van Gerwen in the first round.

The first round (best of five sets) took place on 29 and 30 January. Five-time Masters champion and three-time world champion Michael van Gerwen, who had recently won the Bahrain Darts Masters, was eliminated in a 3–1 defeat to the Australian number one Damon Heta, who converted a 101 checkout to win the match. "It was special that I got the win, it didn't matter who I played," said Heta afterwards. "Me and Michael [van Gerwen] have had a few battles over the years, but to get a win over him is definitely a feather in the cap." Making his full debut after failing to qualify for the main stage of the 2025 edition, the 2026 World Championship runner-up Gian van Veen lost the opening set of his match with Ryan Joyce but came back to claim a 3–1 victory. Van Veen admitted that he "made it a little bit difficult" for himself, acknowledging that his proficiency on double 16 helped him take the win. The 2021 world champion Gerwyn Price produced a three-dart average of 108.51 as he defeated James Hurrell 3–0. "I think I was a little bit ruthless in that game," commented Price, who said he needed to play well against a "fantastic" Hurrell. The 2021 Masters champion Jonny Clayton hit checkouts of 161 and 136 on his way to beating Wessel Nijman 3–1. Two-time world champion Gary Anderson and the 2014 Masters champion James Wade both advanced by winning in a deciding set, getting past Niels Zonneveld and Madars Razma, respectively. Shane McGuirk went 1–0 ahead against Nathan Aspinall before Aspinall won 3–1 with a run of six consecutive legs, while 2023 Masters champion Chris Dobey defeated Jermaine Wattimena 3–0.

Reigning world champion Luke Littler and the 2024 World Grand Prix champion Mike De Decker traded the first two sets of their match, with De Decker taking the next to lead 2–1. After Littler missed double 15 for a nine-dart finish, De Decker missed a match dart on double 11 for a 142 checkout. Littler then levelled the match before winning the next two legs to claim a 3–2 victory. He labelled the contest "tough" and said that De Decker deservedly took the second and third sets. After missing darts to win the opening set, the defending champion Luke Humphries defeated Dave Chisnall 3–1. "If you're not hitting your doubles you're going to put yourself under pressure, but I'm really pleased with the way I ended that match," commented Humphries, who called the World Masters a "cut-throat tournament". Luke Woodhouse achieved his highest televised three-dart average, 108.64, as he beat Martin Schindler 3–0. "I've just shown tonight what I'm capable of, so now it's about doing it over a long period of time and in the big TV events," said Woodhouse afterwards. The 2024 Masters champion Stephen Bunting defeated Jeffrey de Graaf 3–1, while 2018 world champion Rob Cross earned a 3–1 win over recent World Championship semi-finalist Ryan Searle. Ross Smith landed a 150 checkout in the penultimate set of his match against Jimmy van Schie before triumphing 3–1. Josh Rock and Danny Noppert were also 3–1 winners, defeating Connor Scutt and Daryl Gurney, respectively.

=== Second round ===
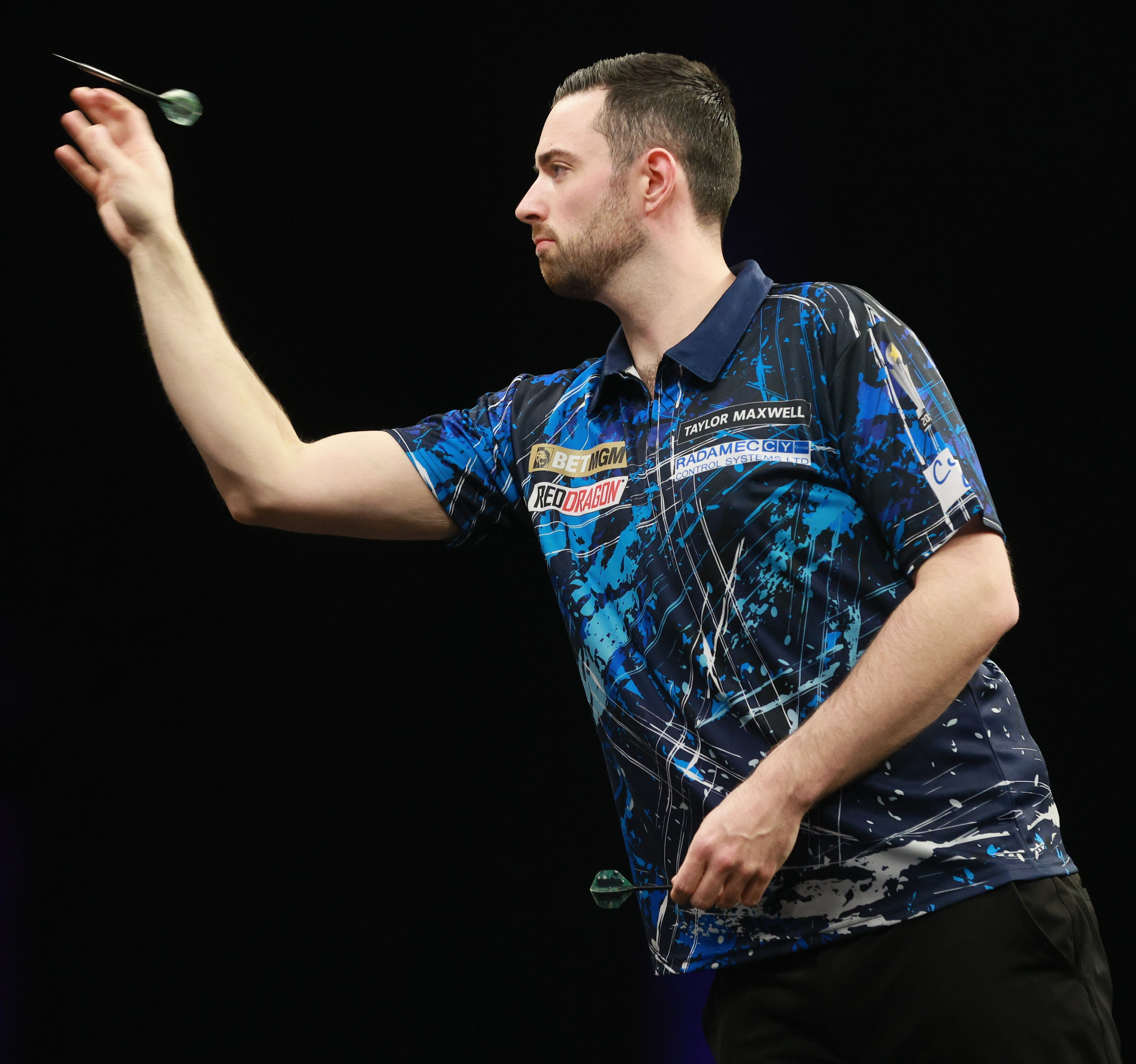
Defending champion Luke Humphries (pictured in 2025) hit a nine-dart finish during his 4–3 victory over Luke Woodhouse in the second round.

The second round (best of seven sets) took place on 31 January. In the afternoon session, Gerwyn Price landed finishes of 161 and 126 as he came back from 2–0 down to defeat Welsh compatriot Jonny Clayton 4–3. Price progressed to the quarter-finals of the tournament for the first time since the 2022 edition. Similarly, James Wade overturned a 2–0 deficit to beat Gary Anderson 4–3. Gian van Veen capitalised on missed doubles from Nathan Aspinall to win 4–2; Van Veen hit 56 per cent of his attempts at double, while Aspinall hit 19 per cent. After establishing a 3–1 lead, Chris Dobey was taken to a deciding set by Damon Heta. Dobey landed a 127 checkout on the bullseye before completing a 4–3 victory.

In the evening session, Luke Humphries hit a nine-dart finish, his third televised nine-darter in the space of a year, to take a 2–0 lead against Luke Woodhouse. However, Humphries missed a match dart on double 19 in the fifth set before missing more as he was brought to a last-leg decider. Humphries halted Woodhouse's comeback by pinning double 10 to win 4–3. "I would rather win the game and not hit a nine-darter than hit a nine-darter and lose, so I am just glad I did both," commented Humphries afterwards. Josh Rock advanced to his first World Masters quarter-final by defeating Rob Cross 4–1. "Rob [Cross] has taught me a lot mentally, and it's always tough playing him, but we’re here to do a job," said Rock after the match. Luke Littler raced into a 3–0 lead against Ross Smith, who won the next set to avoid defeat. The pair entered a deciding leg in the fifth set, where Littler converted a 92 checkout to prevail 4–1. Stephen Bunting was eliminated in a 4–0 defeat to Danny Noppert, who won eight out of nine legs during the match.

=== Quarter-finals ===
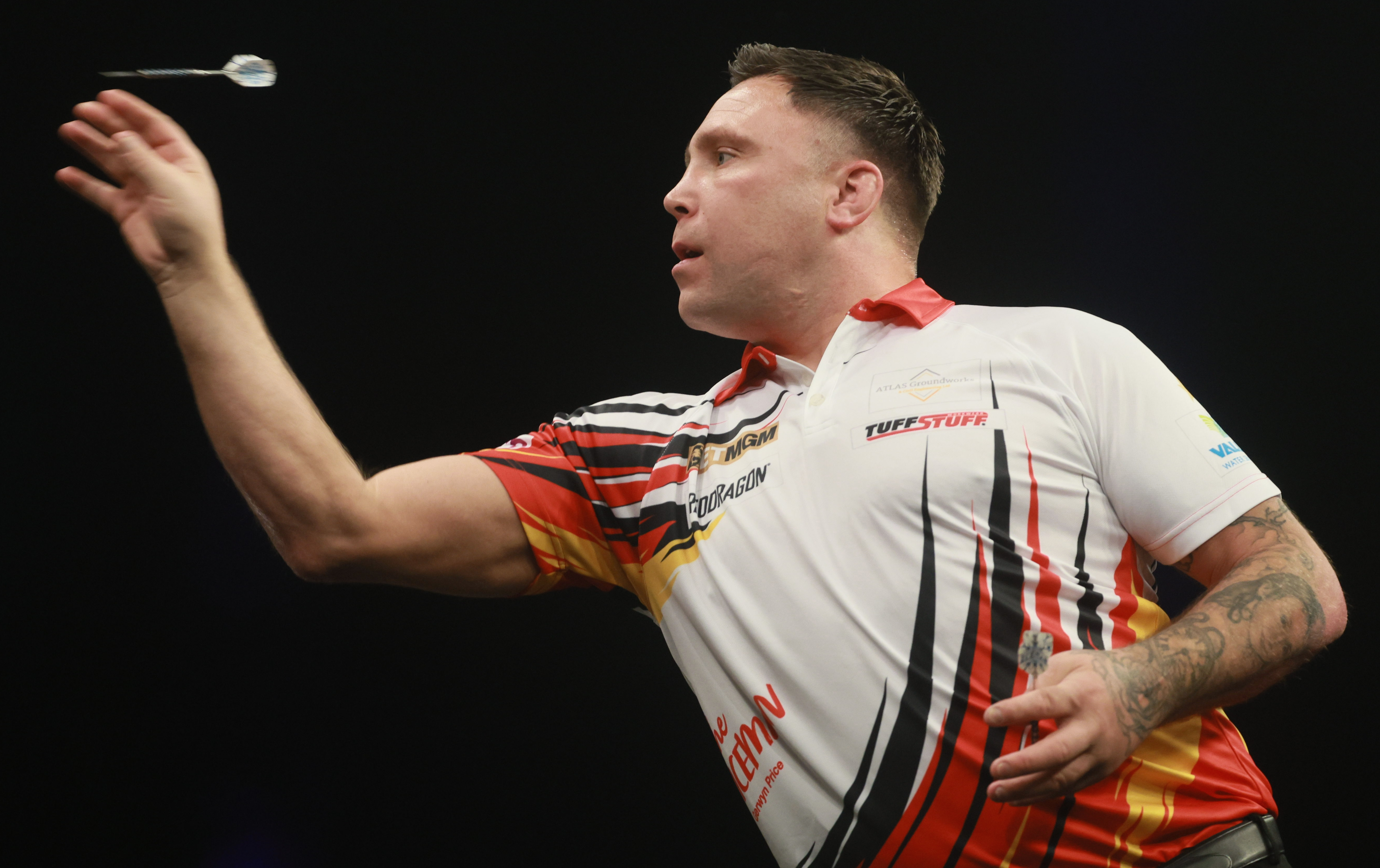
Gerwyn Price reached the semi-finals for the first time since the 2021 edition.

The quarter-finals (best of seven sets) took place in the afternoon session on 1 February. Gerwyn Price advanced to his first World Masters semi-final since 2021 by defeating Chris Dobey 4–2. Luke Littler hit eight maximums as he defeated Josh Rock 4–0, only allowing Rock to register a single leg. A semi-final match between Price and Littler guaranteed a first-time World Masters finalist. "This is where I fell last year, in the quarter-finals, so it's always good to win and guarantee my place," commented Littler.

Gian van Veen converted 73 per cent of his shots at double during his 4–2 win over James Wade. "In my own sets I wasn't really performing and that really frustrated me during the game, but with that finish percentage I got the job done," said Van Veen afterwards. "He [James Wade] beat me in the Matchplay last year and loads of European Tours and floor tournaments. I needed to get one back over him." Luke Humphries completed the semi-final lineup by beating Danny Noppert 4–0.

=== Semi-finals ===
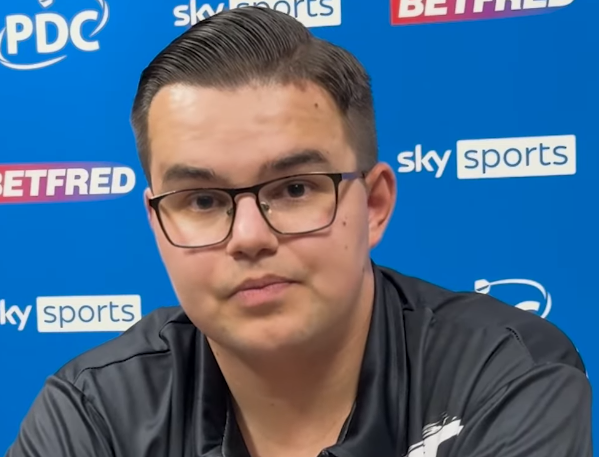
Gian van Veen reached the semi-finals in his tournament debut.

The semi-finals (best of nine sets) took place in the evening session on 1 February. Gerwyn Price faced Luke Littler and Gian van Veen faced Luke Humphries. Price and Littler had previously met twice on the 2026 World Series of Darts; Price eliminated Littler from the Bahrain Darts Masters, while Littler defeated Price on his way to winning the Saudi Arabia Darts Masters a week later. Van Veen entered his semi-final with Humphries having beaten the Englishman in their last five meetings, including a 5–1 win over Humphries in the quarter-finals of the 2026 World Championship. All four semi-finalists were set to compete in the 2026 Premier League.

In the first semi-final, Littler took the lead four times, only for Price to equalise in every subsequent set as the pair went to a decider at 4–4. Price found a break of throw to go within one leg of victory before setting up a 107 finish to win the match. However, he missed a match dart at double 20, allowing Littler to level and then hold his throw in the deciding leg to triumph 5–4. Speaking after the match on ITV4, commentator Wayne Mardle said that Littler's missed doubles—25 out of 37 attempts—went "under the radar" until they "caught up with him" in the final set, saying that Littler ultimately "found a way to get away with it".

In the second semi-final, Humphries recorded a three-dart average of 107.80 as he defeated Van Veen 5–0 to set up a final with Littler. His second victory of the day without dropping a set, Humphries won 10 of the match's 12 legs. "There was some ego in that performance from Luke Humphries. He wanted to get one over on Gian van Veen," said commentator Chris Mason.

=== Final ===
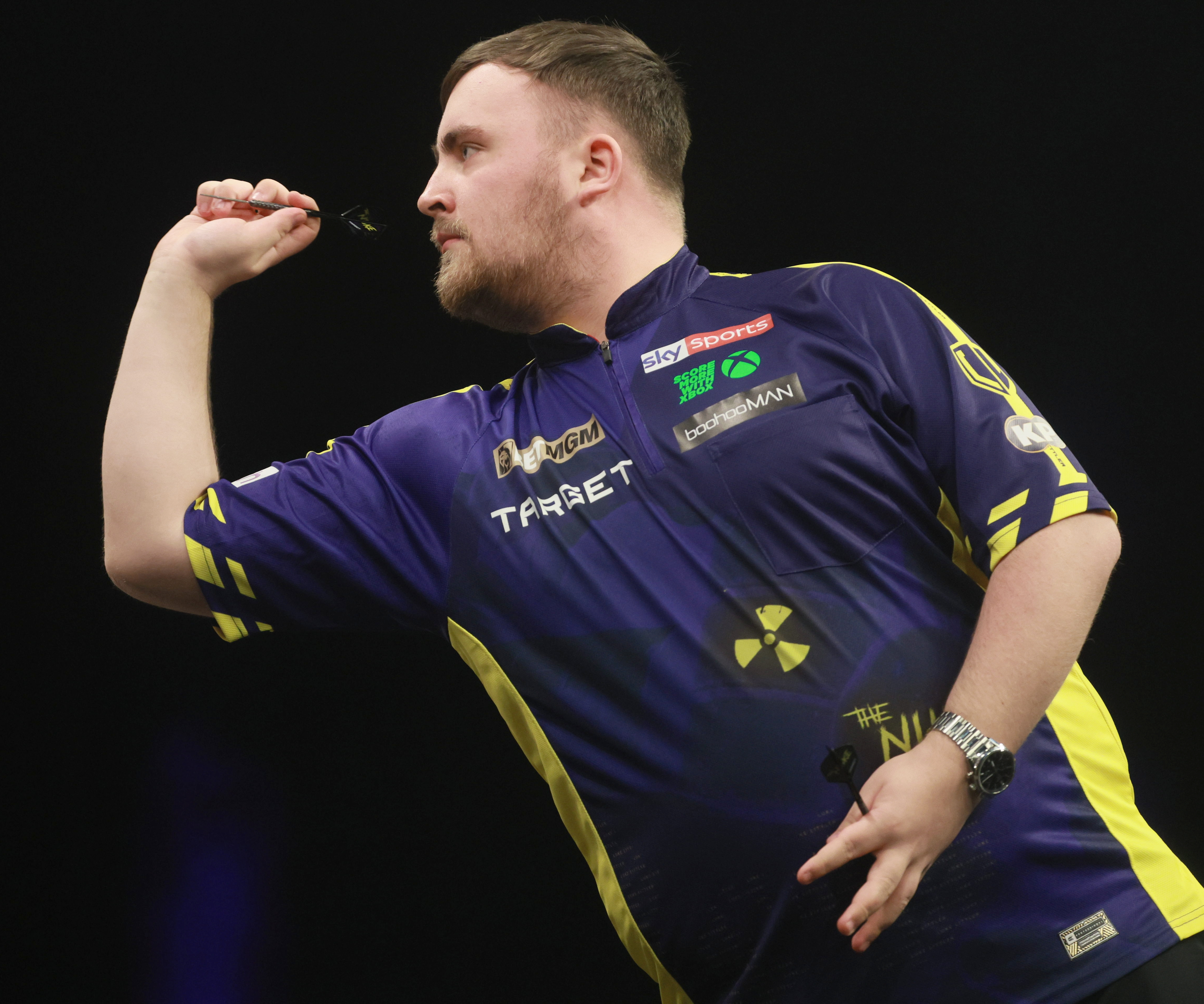
Luke Littler won the World Masters for the first time, his 11th PDC major title and his fourth in a row.

The final between reigning world champion Luke Littler and defending champion Luke Humphries, the tournament's first and second seeds, took place in the evening session on 1 February. Humphries contested his second successive World Masters final, having defeated Jonny Clayton to win the 2025 edition, while Littler reached his first final. It was the seventh major final contested between the pair, with a tied head-to-head record of 3–3 in their previous six meetings. Humphries aimed to retain his title, while Littler looked to achieve a fourth consecutive major win. Commentator Mark Webster called it "the perfect final", also saying that Littler needed a mix of luck and class to make it to the deciding match.

The defending champion claimed the opening set but Littler responded with a 153 checkout to open the next, soon levelling the contest at 1–1. The world champion established a two-set advantage by pinning back-to-back 121 checkouts in the fourth set, with the latter being finished on the bullseye. Humphries then won the next four legs to restore parity at 3–3. He squandered an opportunity to lead by missing three darts to win the seventh set, which Littler capitalised on by going in front once more. Littler missed three darts for another two-set lead, allowing Humphries to equalise again at 4–4. Humphries took a 5–4 lead to go one set away from victory, but Littler completed 13-dart and 12-dart legs to force a deciding set. Littler secured a break of throw before pinning double 10 to win the match 6–5. Littler finished the final with a three-dart average of 104.72, slightly less than Humphries's 105.51, and hit 13 of the match's 25 maximums.

Littler won the World Masters for the first time, his 11th PDC major title. A total of 11 major titles put him joint-third in the PDC's all-time list alongside James Wade, only beaten by Phil Taylor's 79 and Michael van Gerwen's 48. Winning the World Masters also meant that Littler had won all but one of the available PDC major singles titles, only missing the European Championship from his list of honours. "I'm shattered, absolutely knackered. Going into the last break at 5-4 [down], I said I have nothing left, absolutely nothing, but I just managed to dig deep," commented Littler afterwards, adding: "It has been me and Luke [Humphries] in the first major of the year and I'm sure it will continue." Humphries said the three missed darts to win the seventh set were the "only hole" of his game, claiming: "If I hit that shot, the possibility is I go on to win the game." "He [Luke Littler] has shown that true class. I said to him at the end I don't think he has a heart—he never folds under pressure," Humphries said about his opponent. "It may be premature, but I think he's the greatest darts player that's ever lived."

== Preliminary rounds ==
The preliminary rounds began with a group stage, with one seeded player, ranked 57–88, per group. The winner of each group progressed to the last 64 where they faced players ranked 25–56. The eight winners of the last 16 matches qualified for the main tournament.

=== Participants ===
The following PDC Tour Card holders competed in the preliminary rounds.

Nine Tour Card holders—Raymond van Barneveld, Mickey Mansell, Ryan Meikle, Thibault Tricole, Maximilian Czerwinski, Adam Leek, Jurjen van der Velde, Filip Bereza and Matthias Ehlers—withdrew prior to the preliminary rounds.

Seeded players in knockout stage
25. Dimitri Van den Bergh (BEL)
26. Cameron Menzies (SCO)
27. Ritchie Edhouse (ENG)
28. Krzysztof Ratajski (POL)
29. Wessel Nijman (NED) (Qualifier 4)
30. Dirk van Duijvenbode (NED)
31. Peter Wright (SCO)
32. Michael Smith (ENG)
33. Andrew Gilding (ENG)
34. Ricardo Pietreczko (GER)
35. Joe Cullen (ENG)
36. Martin Lukeman (ENG)
37. Kevin Doets (NED)
38. Callan Rydz (ENG)
39. Ricky Evans (ENG)
40. Brendan Dolan (IRL)
41. Niels Zonneveld (NED) (Qualifier 1)
42. William O'Connor (IRL)
43. Scott Williams (ENG)
44. Madars Razma (LAT) (Qualifier 3)
45. Gabriel Clemens (GER)
46. James Hurrell (ENG) (Qualifier 8)
47. Connor Scutt (ENG) (Qualifier 6)
48. Justin Hood (ENG)
49. Jeffrey de Graaf (SWE) (Qualifier 2)
50. Ian White (ENG)
51. Alan Soutar (SCO)
52. Niko Springer (GER)
53. Mensur Suljović (AUT)
54. Richard Veenstra (NED)
55. Keane Barry (IRL)
56. Nick Kenny (WAL)

Seeded players in group stage
57. Kim Huybrechts (BEL)
58. Lukas Wenig (GER)
59. Robert Owen (WAL)
60. Mario Vandenbogaerde (BEL)
61. Karel Sedláček (CZE)
62. Bradley Brooks (ENG)
63. Cam Crabtree (ENG)
64. Wesley Plaisier (NED)
65. Sebastian Białecki (POL)
66. Max Hopp (GER)
67. Adam Lipscombe (ENG)
68. Dominik Grüllich (GER)
69. Cor Dekker (NOR)
70. Maik Kuivenhoven (NED)
71. Andy Boulton (SCO)
72. Tavis Dudeney (ENG)
73. Oskar Lukasiak (SWE)
74. Darryl Pilgrim (ENG)
75. Tom Bissell (ENG)
76. Christian Kist (NED)
77. Leon Weber (GER)
78. Dennie Olde Kalter (NED)
79. Jim Long (CAN)
80. Thomas Lovely (ENG)
81. Marvin van Velzen (NED)
82. Viktor Tingström (SWE)
83. Adam Warner (ENG)
84. Greg Ritchie (SCO)
85. Adam Paxton (ENG)
86. Tytus Kanik (POL)
87. Stefaan Henderyck (BEL)
88. Rusty-Jake Rodriguez (AUT)

Other Tour Card holders

- Pero Ljubić (CRO)
- Kai Gotthardt (GER)
- Beau Greaves (ENG)
- Owen Bates (ENG)
- Stefan Bellmont (SUI)
- Darius Labanauskas (LTU)
- Arno Merk (GER)
- Rhys Griffin (WAL)
- Jeffrey Sparidaans (NED)
- Cristo Reyes (ESP)
- Carl Sneyd (ENG)
- Niall Culleton (IRL)
- Yorick Hofkens (GER)
- Tom Sykes (ENG)
- Shane McGuirk (IRL) (Qualifier 5)
- Jeffrey de Zwaan (NED)
- Sietse Lap (NED)
- Samuel Price (ENG)
- Jimmy van Schie (NED) (Qualifier 7)
- Stephen Burton (ENG)
- Charlie Manby (ENG)
- Chris Landman (NED)
- Mervyn King (ENG)
- Marvin Kraft (GER)
- Tyler Thorpe (ENG)
- Benjamin Pratnemer (SVN)
- Stephen Rosney (IRL)
- Adam Gawlas (CZE)
- David Sharp (SCO)
- Alexander Merkx (NED)
- Pascal Rupprecht (GER)

The following players, who placed in the top eight of their respective secondary or affiliate tour in 2025, participated in the preliminary rounds.

Development Tour

- Jamai van den Herik (NED)
- Ryan Branley (ENG)
- James Beeton (ENG)
- Jenson Walker (ENG)
- Patrik Williams (ENG)
- Nathan Potter (ENG)
- Henry Coates (ENG)

Challenge Tour

- Ted Evetts (ENG)
- Jack Tweddell (ENG)
- Sam Spivey (ENG)
- Scott Waites (ENG)
- Scott Campbell (SCO)
- Danny van Trijp (NED)
- Graham Hall (ENG)

Women's Series

- Fallon Sherrock (ENG)
- Lisa Ashton (ENG)

PDCNB Tour

- Andreas Harrysson (SWE)
- Teemu Harju (FIN)
- Andreas Hyllgaardhus (DEN)

CDC Tour

- Gary Mawson (USA)

CDLC Tour

- Jesús Sálate (ARG)

JDC representatives

- Archie Self (ENG)
- Mason Teese (ENG)
- Nico Bado (GIB)
- Taylor McGuckian (ENG)

=== Results ===
The preliminary rounds were played on 28 January 2026. All matches were played to the best of five sets. The results of the knockout phase are shown below.

==== Section 1 ====
Last 64
1	Dimitri Van den Bergh 83.25	3
Danny van Trijp 84.67	2
32	Nick Kenny 89.35	1
Kim Huybrechts 89.31	3
16	Brendan Dolan 87.54	0
Henry Coates 94.47	3
17	Niels Zonneveld 87.21	3
Jesús Sálate 88.96	0

Last 32
1	Dimitri Van den Bergh 90.85	1
Kim Huybrechts 101.36	3
Henry Coates 93.14	1
17	Niels Zonneveld 94.00	3

Last 16
Kim Huybrechts 89.95	1
17	Niels Zonneveld 90.13	3

==== Section 2 ====
Last 64
8	Michael Smith 87.78	1
Rhys Griffin 92.44	3
25	Jeffrey de Graaf 94.15	3
Wesley Plaisier 81.51	0
9	Andrew Gilding 89.69	1
Jack Tweddell 93.53	3
24	Justin Hood 109.38	3
Sebastian Białecki 102.33	0

Last 32
Rhys Griffin 87.62	0
25	Jeffrey de Graaf 103.25	3
Jack Tweddell 97.26	3
24	Justin Hood 86.90	1

Last 16
25	Jeffrey de Graaf 98.44	3
Jack Tweddell 93.53	0

==== Section 3 ====
Last 64
4	Krzysztof Ratajski 94.77	3
Scott Campbell 75.97	0
29	Mensur Suljović 98.93	1
Mario Vandenbogaerde 97.92	3
13	Kevin Doets 90.89	3
Christian Kist 79.97	0
20	Madars Razma 97.91	3
Cor Dekker 98.00	1

Last 32
4	Krzysztof Ratajski 101.22	3
Mario Vandenbogaerde 92.70	0
13	Kevin Doets 85.95	2
20	Madars Razma 87.08	3

Last 16
4	Krzysztof Ratajski 86.55	1
20	Madars Razma 82.03	3

==== Section 4 ====
Last 64
5	Wessel Nijman 101.05	3
Stefan Bellmont 93.72	1
28	Niko Springer 87.83	3
Pascal Rupprecht 85.14	1
12	Martin Lukeman 92.72	3
Charlie Manby 96.04	2
21	Gabriel Clemens 89.28	3
Dominik Grüllich 87.58	2

Last 32
5	Wessel Nijman 94.48	3
28	Niko Springer 87.46	0
12	Martin Lukeman 89.27	0
21	Gabriel Clemens 96.17	3

Last 16
5	Wessel Nijman 105.57	3
21	Gabriel Clemens 99.41	1

==== Section 5 ====
Last 64
2	Cameron Menzies 94.46	1
Shane McGuirk 92.55	3
31	Keane Barry 85.75	3
Lukas Wenig 87.88	1
15	Ricky Evans 93.35	2
Scott Waites 93.24	3
18	William O'Connor 89.29	0
Patrik Williams 96.34	3

Last 32
Shane McGuirk 94.76	3
31	Keane Barry 93.68	2
Scott Waites 90.00	3
Patrik Williams 82.05	0

Last 16
Shane McGuirk 89.55	3
Scott Waites 96.28	1

==== Section 6 ====
Last 64
7	Peter Wright 92.40	2
Graham Hall 88.32	3
26	Ian White 81.56	2
Cam Crabtree 89.22	3
10	Ricardo Pietreczko 83.38	2
Jeffrey de Zwaan 89.43	3
23	Connor Scutt 91.69	3
Max Hopp 91.18	2

Last 32
Graham Hall 88.43	3
Cam Crabtree 88.00	2
Jeffrey de Zwaan 89.24	2
23	Connor Scutt 99.51	3

Last 16
Graham Hall 95.38	1
23	Connor Scutt 100.30	3

==== Section 7 ====
Last 64
3	Ritchie Edhouse 81.43	1
Jimmy van Schie 88.82	3
30	Richard Veenstra 103.66	3
Robert Owen 88.43	0
14	Callan Rydz 97.04	2
Owen Bates 96.25	3
19	Scott Williams 80.83	3
Benjamin Pratnemer 85.63	2

Last 32
Jimmy van Schie 99.22	3
30	Richard Veenstra 91.24	2
Owen Bates 80.75	0
19	Scott Williams 91.01	3

Last 16
Jimmy van Schie 92.64	3
19	Scott Williams 94.40	1

==== Section 8 ====
Last 64
6	Dirk van Duijvenbode 88.58	1
Beau Greaves 88.72	3
27	Alan Soutar 106.77	3
Bradley Brooks 109.03	1
11	Joe Cullen 98.71	3
Stephen Burton 96.12	1
22	James Hurrell 99.74	3
Kai Gotthardt 82.00	0

Last 32
Beau Greaves 95.96	1
27	Alan Soutar 93.78	3
11	Joe Cullen 99.78	0
22	James Hurrell 111.61	3

Last 16
27	Alan Soutar 91.82	1
22	James Hurrell 89.19	3

== Main draw ==
The draw for the televised stages was announced on 26 January.

Numbers to the left of a player's name show the 16 seeded players for the tournament. The eight preliminary round qualifiers are indicated by 'Q'. The figures to the right of a player's name show their three-dart average in a match. Players in bold denote match winners.

**First round** (best of 5 sets); 29–30 January
**1**	**Luke Littler 98.62**	**3**
Mike De Decker 91.42	2
**16**	**Ross Smith 94.13**	**3**
Q	Jimmy van Schie 93.23	1
8	Ryan Searle 93.73	1
**Rob Cross 91.13**	**3**
**9**	**Josh Rock 95.57**	**3**
Q	Connor Scutt 92.27	1
4	Michael van Gerwen 88.36	1
**Damon Heta 86.46**	**3**
**13**	**Chris Dobey 99.36**	**3**
Jermaine Wattimena 89.73	0
**5**	**Jonny Clayton 102.83**	**3**
Q	Wessel Nijman 91.82	1
**12**	**Gerwyn Price 108.51**	**3**
Q	James Hurrell 101.10	0
**2**	**Luke Humphries 104.13**	**3**
Dave Chisnall 86.75	1
15	Martin Schindler 95.55	0
**Luke Woodhouse 108.64**	**3**
**7**	**Stephen Bunting 98.96**	**3**
Q	Jeffrey de Graaf 89.61	1
**10**	**Danny Noppert 99.30**	**3**
Daryl Gurney 95.85	1
**3**	**Gian van Veen 96.75**	**3**
Ryan Joyce 90.50	1
**14**	**Nathan Aspinall 105.80**	**3**
Q	Shane McGuirk 89.67	1
**6**	**Gary Anderson 101.21**	**3**
Q	Niels Zonneveld 95.01	2
**11**	**James Wade 102.56**	**3**
Q	Madars Razma 95.89	2

**Second round** (best of 7 sets); 31 January
**1**	**Luke Littler 107.88**	**4**
16	Ross Smith 102.14	1
Rob Cross 98.09	1
**9**	**Josh Rock 101.66**	**4**
Damon Heta 95.74	3
**13**	**Chris Dobey 99.17**	**4**
5	Jonny Clayton 93.68	3
**12**	**Gerwyn Price 102.66**	**4**
**2**	**Luke Humphries 105.00**	**4**
Luke Woodhouse 102.84	3
7	Stephen Bunting 88.85	0
**10**	**Danny Noppert 96.43**	**4**
**3**	**Gian van Veen 95.36**	**4**
14	Nathan Aspinall 99.41	2
6	Gary Anderson 94.16	3
**11**	**James Wade 96.71**	**4**

**Quarter-finals** (best of 7 sets); 1 February
**1**	**Luke Littler 105.92**	**4**
9	Josh Rock 94.10	0
13	Chris Dobey 96.20	2
**12**	**Gerwyn Price 96.95**	**4**
**2**	**Luke Humphries 101.67**	**4**
10	Danny Noppert 97.63	0
**3**	**Gian van Veen 102.66**	**4**
11	James Wade 103.68	2

**Semi-finals** (best of 9 sets); 1 February
**1**	**Luke Littler 101.56**	**5**
12	Gerwyn Price 99.73	4
**2**	**Luke Humphries 107.80**	**5**
3	Gian van Veen 102.93	0

**Final** (best of 11 sets); 1 February
**1**	**Luke Littler 104.72**	**6**
2	Luke Humphries 105.51	5

== Final ==
Best of 11 sets Referee: Huw Ware; Arena MK, Milton Keynes, England, 1 February 2026
Luke Littler	6–5	Luke Humphries
1–2, 2–1, 2–0, 2–1, 1–2, 0-2, 2–1, 1–2, 1–2, 2–0, 2–0
104.72	Average (3 darts)	105.51
33	100+ scores	34
25	140+ scores	27
13	180 scores	12
153	Highest checkout	108
3	100+ Checkouts	1
16/43 (37,2%)	Checkout summary	13/28 (46,4%)

== Highest averages ==
This table shows all three-dart averages over 100 achieved by players throughout the tournament. For players with multiple high averages, this is indicated by the number in brackets.

The three-dart average is the most cited statistic in darts matches as it gives a rough estimate of a player's form. For comparison with previous years, see the highest ever recorded averages in the World Masters.

World Masters main draw
Player	Round	Average	Opponent	Result
Luke Woodhouse	1	108.64	Martin Schindler	Won
Gerwyn Price	1	108.51	James Hurrell	Won
Luke Littler	2	107.88	Ross Smith	Won
Luke Humphries	SF	107.80	Gian van Veen	Won
Luke Littler (2)	QF	105.92	Josh Rock	Won
Nathan Aspinall	1	105.80	Shane McGuirk	Won
Luke Humphries (2)	F	105.51	Luke Littler	Lost
Luke Humphries (3)	2	105.00	Luke Woodhouse	Won
Luke Littler (3)	F	104.72	Luke Humphries	Won
Luke Humphries (4)	1	104.13	Dave Chisnall	Won
James Wade	QF	103.68	Gian van Veen	Lost
Gian van Veen	SF	102.93	Luke Humphries	Lost
Luke Woodhouse (2)	2	102.84	Luke Humphries	Lost
Jonny Clayton	1	102.83	Wessel Nijman	Won
Gerwyn Price (2)	2	102.66	Jonny Clayton	Won
Gian van Veen (2)	QF	102.66	James Wade	Won
James Wade (2)	1	102.56	Madars Razma	Won
Ross Smith	2	102.14	Luke Littler	Lost
Luke Humphries (5)	QF	101.67	Danny Noppert	Won
Josh Rock	2	101.66	Rob Cross	Won
Luke Littler (4)	SF	101.56	Gerwyn Price	Won
Gary Anderson	1	101.21	Niels Zonneveld	Won
James Hurrell	1	101.10	Gerwyn Price	Lost

16 different players achieved a three-dart average over 100 during the preliminary rounds.

World Masters preliminary draw
Player	Round	Average	Opponent	Result
James Hurrell	2	111.61	Joe Cullen	Won
Justin Hood	1	109.38	Sebastian Białecki	Won
Bradley Brooks	1	109.03	Alan Soutar	Lost
Alan Soutar	1	106.77	Bradley Brooks	Won
Wessel Nijman	3	105.57	Gabriel Clemens	Won
Richard Veenstra	1	103.66	Robert Owen	Won
Lukas Wenig	GS	103.62	Pero Ljubić	Won
Beau Greaves	GS	102.53	Adam Warner	Won
Sebastian Białecki	1	102.33	Justin Hood	Lost
Kim Huybrechts	2	101.36	Dimitri Van den Bergh	Won
Krzysztof Ratajski	2	101.22	Mario Vandenbogaerde	Won
Wessel Nijman (2)	1	101.05	Stefan Bellmont	Won
Connor Scutt	3	100.30	Graham Hall	Won
