= 2025 PDC World Masters =

Darts tournament

2025 Winmau World Masters

Tournament information
- Dates: 30 January – 2 February 2025 (Main tournament)
- Venue: Arena MK
- Location: Milton Keynes, England
- Organisation(s): Professional Darts Corporation (PDC)
- Format: Sets (best of 3 legs); Final – first to 6 sets
- Prize fund: £500,000
- Winner's share: £100,000
- Nine-dart finish: Dimitri Van den Bergh
- High checkout: 170 William Borland

Champion(s)
- Luke Humphries (ENG)

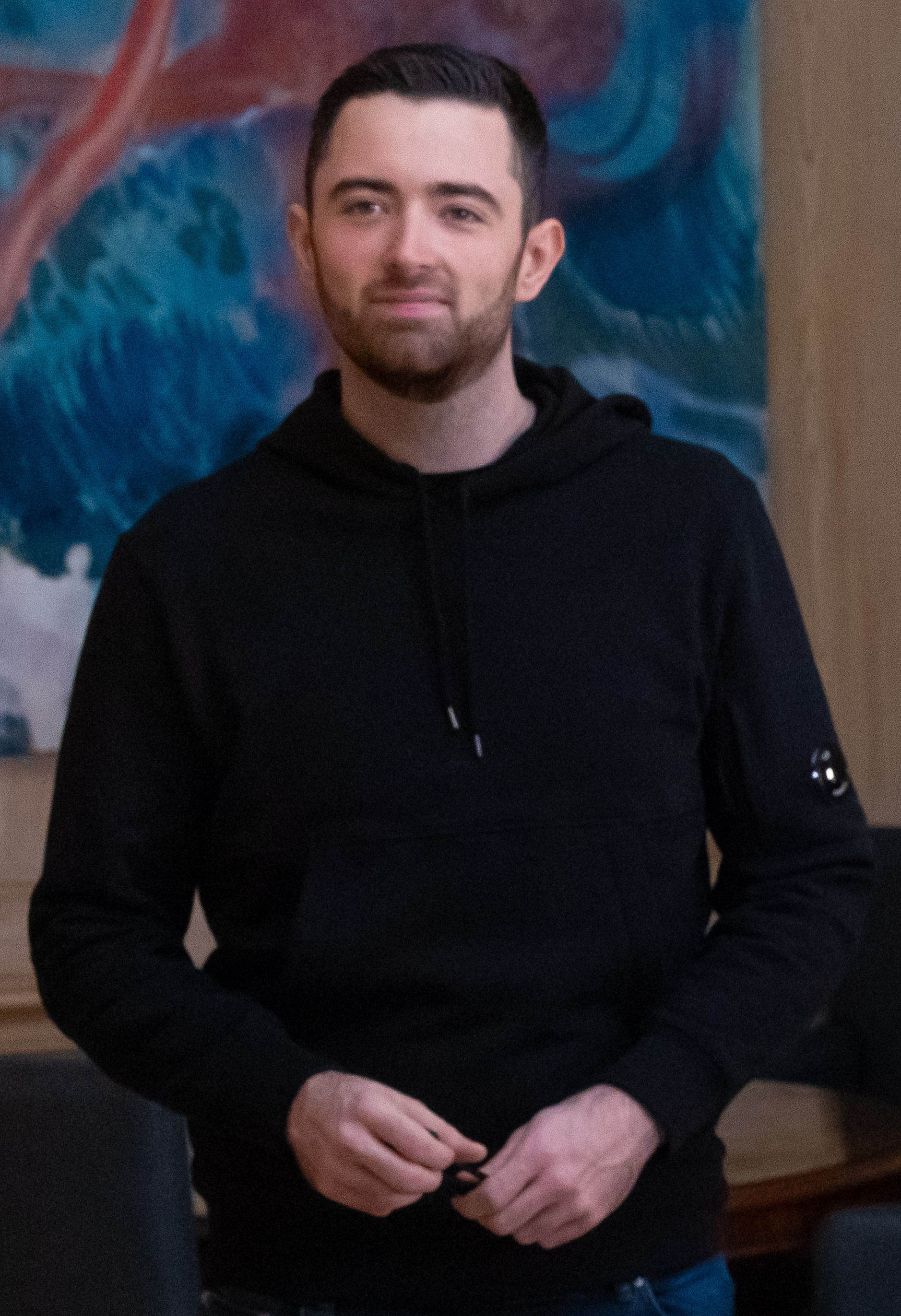
Luke Humphries won the World Masters for the first time in his career.

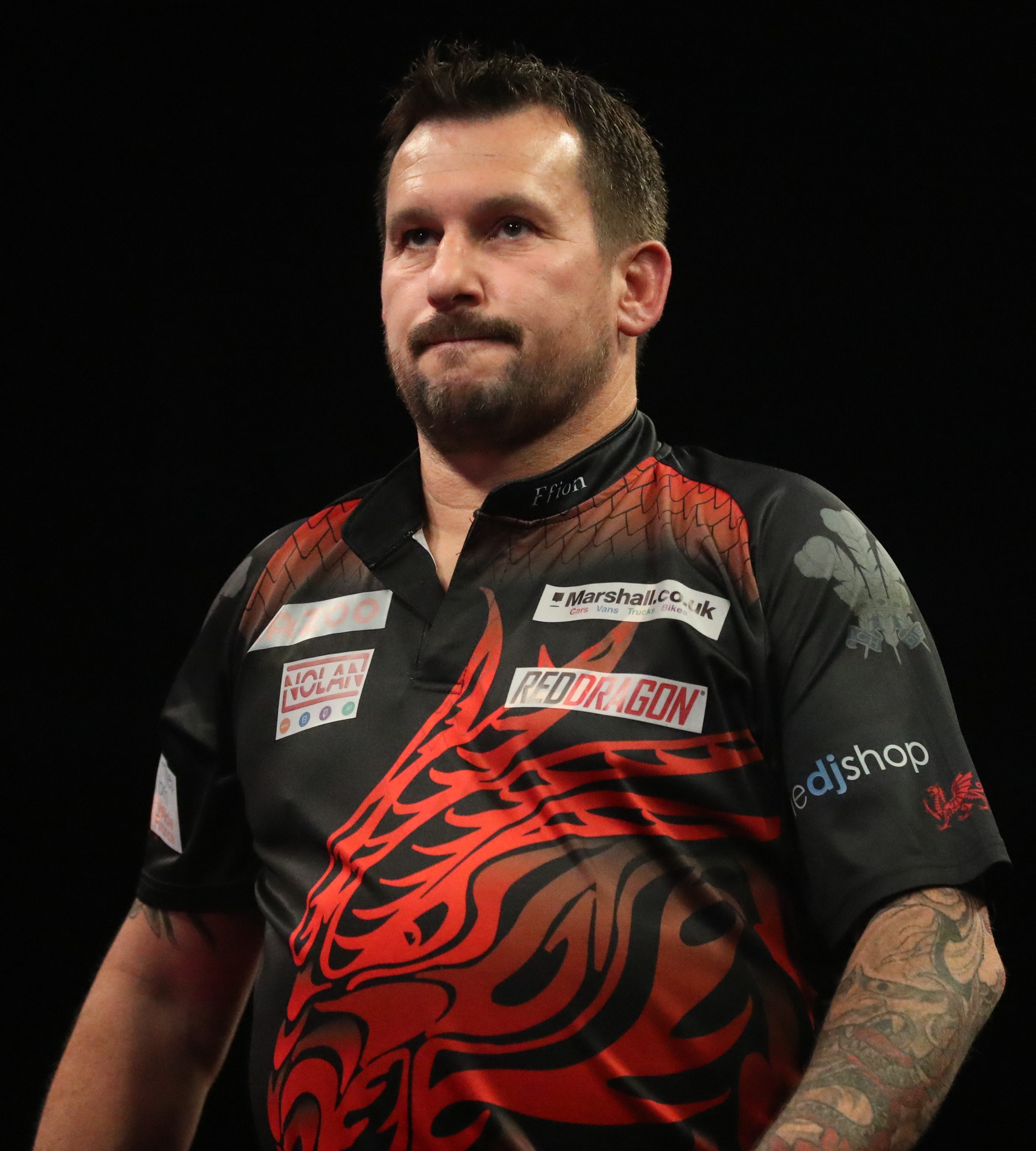
2021 Masters champion Jonny Clayton was defeated in the final.

The 2025 PDC World Masters (known for sponsorship reasons as the 2025 Winmau World Masters) was a professional darts tournament that took place at the Arena MK in Milton Keynes, England, from 30 January to 2 February 2025. The preliminary rounds of the tournament were held at the Marshall Arena on 29 January 2025. It was the 13th Masters to be organised by the Professional Darts Corporation and the first under the World Masters rebrand. It was the first time the tournament was ranked and was using set play.

Stephen Bunting was the defending champion after beating Michael van Gerwen 11–7 in the 2024 final. However, he lost 4–3 to Danny Noppert in the quarter-finals. Luke Humphries won the tournament, defeating Jonny Clayton 6–5 in the final.

Dimitri Van den Bergh hit a nine-dart finish during his second round victory over Michael van Gerwen.

== Overview ==
=== Background ===
The inaugural edition of the Masters, the 2013 Masters, was held by the Professional Darts Corporation (PDC) from 1–3 November 2013 at the Royal Highland Centre in Edinburgh, Scotland and was broadcast live on ITV4. Phil Taylor won the first final, defeating Adrian Lewis 10–1. Since 2015, the tournament has been held in Milton Keynes. The tournament initially featured the top 16 players in the world before increasing to the top 24 in 2021.

In August 2024, it was announced that for the 2025 event, the field would expand to 32 players and it would be the first edition where the tournament was ranked. However, this preceded a bigger announcement that was made on 28 October. The PDC announced a complete revamp of the competition, rebranding it from the Masters to the World Masters (sponsored by Winmau), emulating the World Masters which was first held in 1975 and organised by the British Darts Organisation and later the World Darts Federation. The revamp saw a change in format from leg play to classic World Masters set play (best of 3 legs in a set), and saw preliminary rounds introduced for players outside of the top 24 and players from the PDC's affiliated tours to determine who would join the top 24 in the main competition.

The 2025 event was held from 30 January to 2 February at the Marshall Arena in Milton Keynes, England. The defending champion was Stephen Bunting, who won his first PDC televised title by defeating Michael van Gerwen 11–7 in the 2024 final.

=== Format ===
All matches were played as straight in (player begins scoring with their first throw no matter what section is hit), double out (a segment on the outer ring or the bullseye), requiring the players to score 501 points to win a leg, finishing on a double. The matches were played in set format, with a minimum of two sets required to win a match. All sets were played to the best of three legs.

Round	Best of (sets)	First to (sets)
Preliminary	3	2
First	5	3
Second	7	4
Quarter-finals	7	4
Semi-finals	9	5
Final	11	6

=== Prize money ===
The prize money for the tournament was £500,000 in total. The winner's prize money was £100,000.

Position (no. of players)		Prize money (Total: £500,000)
Winner	(1)	£100,000
Runner-up	(1)	£50,000
Semi-finalists	(2)	£30,000
Quarter-finalists	(4)	£17,500
Second round losers	(8)	£10,000
First round losers	(16)	£5,000
Preliminary round Last 16 losers	(8)	£2,500
Preliminary round Last 32 losers	(16)	£1,000
Preliminary round Last 64 losers	(32)	£750

== Qualifiers ==
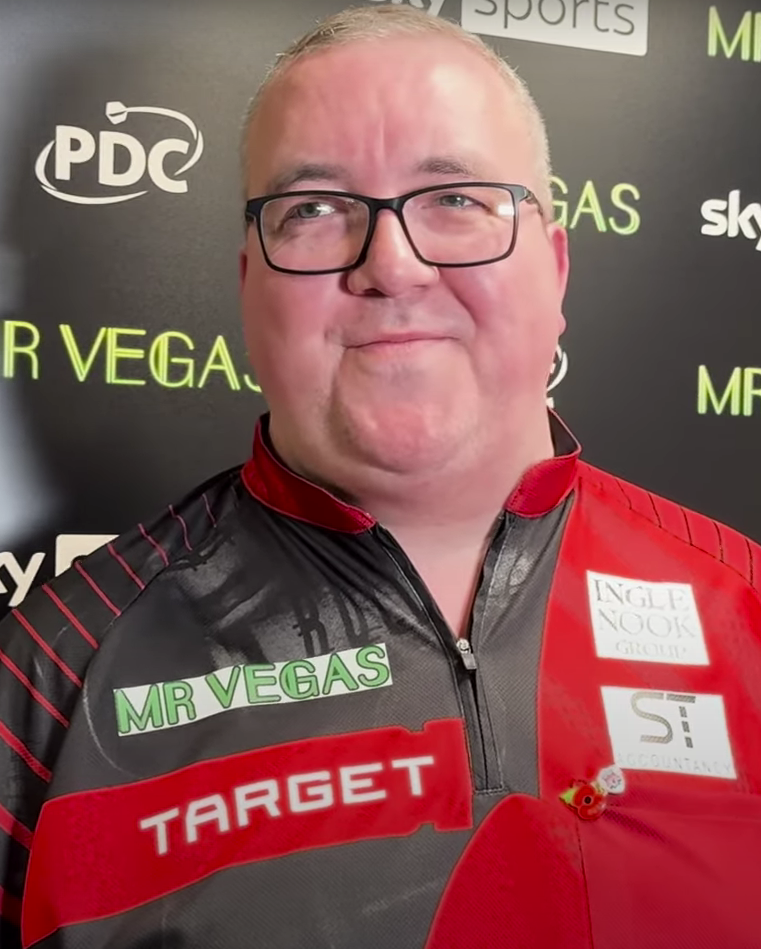
Stephen Bunting was the defending champion going into the tournament.

The World Masters featured the top 24 players in the PDC Order of Merit after the 2025 PDC World Darts Championship automatically qualifying for the first round, while the 2025 Tour Card Holders ranked outside the top 24 competed in preliminary rounds held on 29 January 2025 alongside players from affiliated tours to determine the last eight players in the main field. The top sixteen players on the Order of Merit were seeded for the tournament.

The list of participants was as follows:

Seeded Players

1. Luke Humphries (champion)
2. Luke Littler (quarter-finals)
3. Michael van Gerwen (second round)
4. Rob Cross (first round)
5. Stephen Bunting (quarter-finals)
6. Dave Chisnall (first round)
7. Jonny Clayton (runner-up)
8. Damon Heta (quarter-finals)
9. Gerwyn Price (second round)
10. Chris Dobey (first round)
11. Nathan Aspinall (quarter-finals)
12. Peter Wright (second round)
13. Danny Noppert (semi-finals)
14. Gary Anderson (first round)
15. James Wade (second round)
16. Josh Rock (second round)

Order of Merit Qualifiers

1. Michael Smith (first round)
2. Dimitri Van den Bergh (semi-finals)
3. Ryan Searle (second round)
4. Andrew Gilding (first round)
5. Ross Smith (first round)
6. Martin Schindler (first round)
7. Joe Cullen (first round)
8. Mike De Decker (first round)

Preliminary Round Qualifiers

1. Kevin Doets (first round)
2. Bradley Brooks (first round)
3. Andy Baetens (first round)
4. Florian Hempel (first round)
5. William Borland (first round)
6. Jermaine Wattimena (first round)
7. Cameron Menzies (second round)
8. William O'Connor (second round)

== Preliminary rounds ==
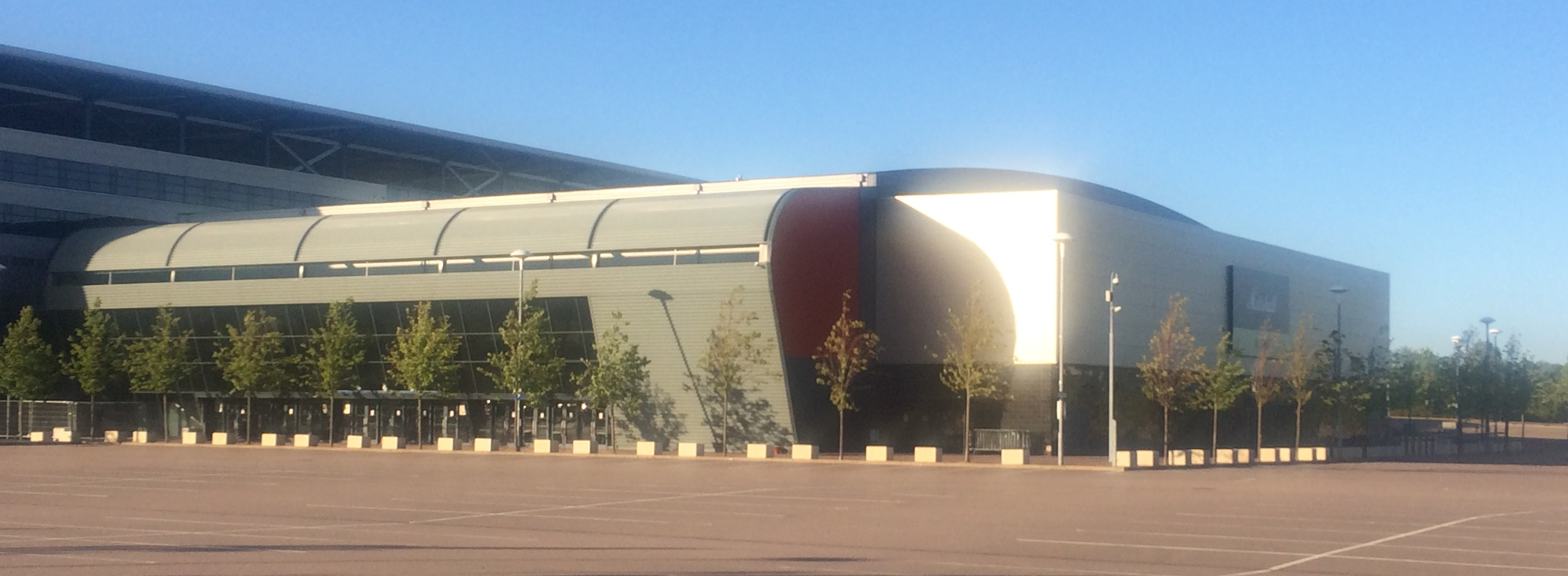
The preliminary rounds and main tournament were held at the Marshall Arena in Milton Keynes, England.

The preliminary rounds began with a group stage, with one seeded player per group (the players ranked 57–88 were seeded). The winner of each group progressed to the last 64 where they faced players ranked 25–56. The eight winners of the last 16 matches qualified for the main tournament.

Raymond van Barneveld (ranked world number thirty-four) did not enter the preliminary rounds. Dylan Slevin therefore received a bye to the last 64.

The following players participated in the last 64 of the preliminary rounds:

=== Number 25–56 on the PDC Order of Merit (seeded players) ===
25. Daryl Gurney
26. Dirk van Duijvenbode
27. Gian van Veen
28. Ritchie Edhouse
29. Ryan Joyce
30. Ricardo Pietreczko
31. Brendan Dolan
32. Krzysztof Ratajski
33. Luke Woodhouse
34. Jermaine Wattimena (qualified)
35. Scott Williams
36. Gabriel Clemens
37. Martin Lukeman
38. Cameron Menzies (qualified)
39. Callan Rydz
40. Kevin Doets (qualified)
41. Madars Razma
42. Mickey Mansell
43. Ricky Evans
44. José de Sousa
45. Kim Huybrechts
46. Richard Veenstra
47. Niels Zonneveld
48. Ian White
49. Keane Barry
50. Jim Williams
51. William O'Connor (qualified)
52. Florian Hempel (qualified)
53. Matt Campbell
54. Wessel Nijman
55. Alan Soutar
56. Dylan Slevin

=== Group winners ===
1. Joshua Richardson
2. William Borland (qualified)
3. Aden Kirk (Note: Qualified via the PDC Challenge Tour)
4. Darius Labanauskas (Note: Qualified via the PDC Nordic & Baltic Tour)
5. Adam Hunt
6. Jeffrey de Graaf
7. Nick Kenny
8. Owen Bates
9. Cam Crabtree
10. Nathan Girvan (Note: Qualified via the PDC Development Tour)
11. Ryan Meikle
12. Jitse van der Wal
13. Andreas Harrysson
14. Berry van Peer
15. Jimmy van Schie
16. Andy Boulton
17. Radek Szagański
18. Brett Claydon
19. Karel Sedláček
20. Andy Baetens (qualified)
21. Tom Bissell
22. Marvin van Velzen
23. Oskar Lukasiak
24. Bradley Brooks (qualified)
25. Thibault Tricole
26. Thomas Lovely
27. Danny Lauby
28. Mensur Suljović
29. Adam Lipscombe
30. Pero Ljubić
31. Henry Coates
32. Ryan Branley (Note: Qualified as a JDC representative)

The draw for the preliminary rounds was made on 29 January 2025.

All matches were played to the best of three sets (the first player to win two sets wins the match).

The knockout phase results are shown below.

=== Section 1 ===
Last 64 (best of 3 sets); 29 January
25	Daryl Gurney 92.58	2
Joshua Richardson 88.46	1
56	Dylan Slevin 88.75	2
Ryan Branley 89.66	0
40	Kevin Doets 92.46	2
Andy Boulton 93.20	0
41	Madars Razma 88.18	1
Radek Szagański 80.82	2

Last 32 (best of 3 sets); 29 January
25	Daryl Gurney 93.06	1
56	Dylan Slevin 92.29	2
40	Kevin Doets 91.69	2
Radek Szagański 88.09	1

Last 16 (best of 3 sets); 29 January
56	Dylan Slevin 87.09	0
40	Kevin Doets 91.09	2

=== Section 2 ===
Last 64 (best of 3 sets); 29 January
32	Krzysztof Ratajski 91.48	2
Owen Bates 91.23	0
49	Keane Barry 83.58	2
Thibault Tricole 82.47	1
33	Luke Woodhouse 95.50	1
Cam Crabtree 89.05	2
48	Ian White 92.10	0
Bradley Brooks 91.96	2

Last 32 (best of 3 sets); 29 January
32	Krzysztof Ratajski 100.19	2
49	Keane Barry 92.67	1
Cam Crabtree 83.70	0
Bradley Brooks 91.89	2

Last 16 (best of 3 sets); 29 January
32	Krzysztof Ratajski 89.43	0
Bradley Brooks 96.60	2

=== Section 3 ===
Last 64 (best of 3 sets); 29 January
28	Ritchie Edhouse 70.33	0
Darius Labanauskas 70.73	2
53	Matt Campbell 85.11	2
Adam Lipscombe 84.34	0
37	Martin Lukeman 76.76	2
Andreas Harrysson 80.70	1
44	José de Sousa 83.70	1
Andy Baetens 85.94	2

Last 32 (best of 3 sets); 29 January
Darius Labanauskas 97.92	2
53	Matt Campbell 89.01	1
37	Martin Lukeman 86.18	0
Andy Baetens 96.04	2

Last 16 (best of 3 sets); 29 January
Darius Labanauskas 97.55	0
Andy Baetens 100.87	2

=== Section 4 ===
Last 64 (best of 3 sets); 29 January
29	Ryan Joyce 94.72	2
Adam Hunt 85.52	0
52	Florian Hempel 110.57	2
Mensur Suljović 96.82	1
36	Gabriel Clemens 80.16	2
Jitse van der Wal 71.57	0
45	Kim Huybrechts 87.03	2
Tom Bissell 77.13	0

Last 32 (best of 3 sets); 29 January
29	Ryan Joyce 90.12	0
52	Florian Hempel 92.19	2
36	Gabriel Clemens 88.18	2
45	Kim Huybrechts 81.93	0

Last 16 (best of 3 sets); 29 January
52	Florian Hempel 87.73	2
36	Gabriel Clemens 88.06	0

=== Section 5 ===
Last 64 (best of 3 sets); 29 January
26	Dirk van Duijvenbode 89.80	1
William Borland 101.63	2
55	Alan Soutar 89.65	2
Henry Coates 89.55	1
39	Callan Rydz 100.76	1
Jimmy van Schie 95.29	2
42	Mickey Mansell 87.96	2
Brett Claydon 80.16	1

Last 32 (best of 3 sets); 29 January
William Borland 81.16	2
55	Alan Soutar 87.53	1
Jimmy van Schie 92.08	1
42	Mickey Mansell 92.85	2

Last 16 (best of 3 sets); 29 January
William Borland 92.18	2
42	Mickey Mansell 87.91	1

=== Section 6 ===
Last 64 (best of 3 sets); 29 January
31	Brendan Dolan 89.89	1
Nick Kenny 85.45	2
50	Jim Williams 87.74	2
Thomas Lovely 83.31	1
34	Jermaine Wattimena 95.81	2
Nathan Girvan 71.56	0
47	Niels Zonneveld 98.97	2
Oskar Lukasiak 84.28	1

Last 32 (best of 3 sets); 29 January
Nick Kenny 91.42	2
50	Jim Williams 84.53	1
34	Jermaine Wattimena 99.00	2
47	Niels Zonneveld 93.30	0

Last 16 (best of 3 sets); 29 January
Nick Kenny 95.22	1
34	Jermaine Wattimena 95.97	2

=== Section 7 ===
Last 64 (best of 3 sets); 29 January
27	Gian van Veen 92.29	2
Aden Kirk 90.08	0
54	Wessel Nijman 101.90	2
Pero Ljubić 92.94	0
38	Cameron Menzies 92.95	2
Berry van Peer 86.05	1
43	Ricky Evans 81.09	2
Karel Sedláček 90.40	0

Last 32 (best of 3 sets); 29 January
27	Gian van Veen 106.01	2
54	Wessel Nijman 100.71	1
38	Cameron Menzies 92.49	2
43	Ricky Evans 87.81	0

Last 16 (best of 3 sets); 29 January
27	Gian van Veen 94.37	0
38	Cameron Menzies 106.16	2

=== Section 8 ===
Last 64 (best of 3 sets); 29 January
30	Ricardo Pietreczko 80.38	0
Jeffrey de Graaf 88.41	2
51	William O'Connor 93.94	2
Danny Lauby 90.35	0
35	Scott Williams 90.49	0
Ryan Meikle 95.58	2
46	Richard Veenstra 96.62	2
Marvin van Velzen 90.08	1

Last 32 (best of 3 sets); 29 January
Jeffrey de Graaf 77.63	1
51	William O'Connor 91.97	2
Ryan Meikle 78.59	0
46	Richard Veenstra 81.31	2

Last 16 (best of 3 sets); 29 January
51	William O'Connor 86.45	2
46	Richard Veenstra 85.74	0

== Schedule ==
Thursday, 30 January

Evening session (19:00 GMT)
Match no.	Round	Player 1	Score	Player 2	Set 1	Set 2	Set 3	Set 4	Set 5
01	1	Josh Rock 98.16	3–1	Jermaine Wattimena 94.75	2–1	0–2	2–0	2–1	—N/a
02	1	Damon Heta 92.32	3–1	Ross Smith 96.81	2–1	0–2	2–0	2–1	—N/a
03	1	Rob Cross 103.19	1–3	William O'Connor 98.75	2–0	1–2	0–2	1–2	—N/a
04	1	Gerwyn Price 97.49	3–0	Florian Hempel 92.08	2–0	2–0	2–1	—N/a	
05	1	Peter Wright 101.28	3–2	Kevin Doets 97.42	1–2	2–0	0–2	2–1	2–1
06	1	Luke Humphries 98.62	3–1	Joe Cullen 92.50	2–1	2–0	1–2	2–0	—N/a
07	1	Stephen Bunting 96.14	3–2	William Borland 82.74	0–2	1–2	2–0	2–1	2–1
08	1	Danny Noppert 97.32	3–1	Michael Smith 96.99	2–0	1–2	2–1	2–1	—N/a

Friday, 31 January

Evening session (19:00 GMT)
Match no.	Round	Player 1	Score	Player 2	Set 1	Set 2	Set 3	Set 4	Set 5
09	1	James Wade 92.61	3–2	Mike De Decker 91.76	2–0	0–2	2–0	1–2	2–0
10	1	Dave Chisnall 90.69	1–3	Cameron Menzies 87.74	1–2	0–2	2–0	0–2	—N/a
11	1	Jonny Clayton 112.77	3–1	Martin Schindler 105.05	2–1	2–0	0–2	2–0	—N/a
12	1	Nathan Aspinall 103.77	3–0	Andrew Gilding 101.26	2–0	2–0	2–1	—N/a	
13	1	Chris Dobey 91.83	1–3	Ryan Searle 90.93	1–2	2–1	1–2	1–2	—N/a
14	1	Luke Littler 104.33	3–0	Andy Baetens 95.94	2–1	2–0	2–0	—N/a	
15	1	Michael van Gerwen 95.87	3–1	Bradley Brooks 91.17	2–0	1–2	2–0	2–0	—N/a
16	1	Gary Anderson 100.03	1–3	Dimitri Van den Bergh 102.43	2–0	0–2	0–2	0–2	—N/a

Saturday, 1 February

Afternoon session (13:00 GMT)
Match no.	Round	Player 1	Score	Player 2	Set 1	Set 2	Set 3	Set 4	Set 5	Set 6	Set 7
17	2	William O'Connor 88.16	0–4	Danny Noppert 96.27	1–2	1–2	1–2	1–2	—N/a		
18	2	Damon Heta 94.58	4–3	Gerwyn Price 96.37	2–0	0–2	2–1	2–0	1–2	0–2	2–1
19	2	Stephen Bunting 93.67	4–2	Peter Wright 94.84	2–0	2–1	0–2	2–1	1–2	2–1	—N/a
20	2	Luke Humphries 94.63	4–0	Josh Rock 94.78	2–1	2–1	2–0	2–0	—N/a		

Evening session (19:00 GMT)
Match no.	Round	Player 1	Score	Player 2	Set 1	Set 2	Set 3	Set 4	Set 5	Set 6	Set 7
21	2	Jonny Clayton 93.54	4–3	Ryan Searle 93.87	2–0	1–2	0–2	1–2	2–1	2–0	2–1
22	2	Cameron Menzies 83.75	1–4	Nathan Aspinall 90.84	2–1	1–2	0–2	1–2	0–2	—N/a	
23	2	Luke Littler 105.47	4–0	James Wade 91.87	2–0	2–0	2–0	2–0	—N/a		
24	2	Michael van Gerwen 98.63	3–4	Dimitri Van den Bergh 97.70	2–0	1–2	1–2	2–1	2–1	1–2	0–2

Sunday, 2 February

Afternoon session (13:00 GMT)
Match no.	Round	Player 1	Score	Player 2	Set 1	Set 2	Set 3	Set 4	Set 5	Set 6	Set 7
25	QF	Luke Humphries 104.24	4–1	Damon Heta 97.78	2–1	1–2	2–1	2–0	2–0	—N/a	
26	QF	Danny Noppert 97.58	4–3	Stephen Bunting 101.28	1–2	2–0	2–0	2–0	0–2	1–2	2–1
27	QF	Luke Littler 108.50	2–4	Jonny Clayton 103.96	1–2	2–0	0–2	1–2	2–1	1–2	—N/a
28	QF	Dimitri Van den Bergh 100.35	4–1	Nathan Aspinall 93.87	2–0	1–2	2–0	2–0	2–0	—N/a	

Evening session (19:00 GMT)
Match no.	Round	Player 1	Score	Player 2	Set 1	Set 2	Set 3	Set 4	Set 5	Set 6	Set 7	Set 8	Set 9	Set 10	Set 11
29	SF	Luke Humphries 99.71	5–2	Danny Noppert 88.33	0–2	0–2	2–0	2–0	2–1	2–0	2–0	—N/a			
30	SF	Jonny Clayton 90.51	5–2	Dimitri Van den Bergh 85.19	2–0	0–2	2–0	2–0	1–2	2–1	2–1	—N/a			
31	F	Luke Humphries 100.42	6–5	Jonny Clayton 98.25	1–2	2–0	0–2	2–0	2–1	2–0	2–1	0–2	0–2	1–2	2–1

== Main draw ==
The draw for the televised stages was made on 21 January.

First round (best of 5 sets); 30–31 January
1	Luke Humphries 98.62	3
Joe Cullen 92.50	1
16	Josh Rock 98.16	3
Q	Jermaine Wattimena 94.75	1
8	Damon Heta 92.32	3
Ross Smith 96.81	1
9	Gerwyn Price 97.49	3
Q	Florian Hempel 92.08	0
4	Rob Cross 103.19	1
Q	William O'Connor 98.75	3
13	Danny Noppert 97.32	3
Michael Smith 96.99	1
5	Stephen Bunting 95.03	3
Q	William Borland 92.06	2
12	Peter Wright 101.28	3
Q	Kevin Doets 97.42	2
2	Luke Littler 104.33	3
Q	Andy Baetens 95.94	0
15	James Wade 92.61	3
Mike De Decker 91.76	2
7	Jonny Clayton 112.77	3
Martin Schindler 105.05	1
10	Chris Dobey 91.83	1
Ryan Searle 90.93	3
3	Michael van Gerwen 95.87	3
Q	Bradley Brooks 91.17	1
14	Gary Anderson 100.03	1
Dimitri Van den Bergh 102.43	3
6	Dave Chisnall 90.69	1
Q	Cameron Menzies 87.74	3
11	Nathan Aspinall 103.77	3
Andrew Gilding 101.26	0

Second round (best of 7 sets); 1 February
1	Luke Humphries 94.63	4
16	Josh Rock 94.78	0
8	Damon Heta 94.58	4
9	Gerwyn Price 96.37	3
Q	William O'Connor 88.16	0
13	Danny Noppert 96.27	4
5	Stephen Bunting 93.67	4
12	Peter Wright 94.84	2
2	Luke Littler 105.47	4
15	James Wade 91.42	0
7	Jonny Clayton 93.54	4
Ryan Searle 93.87	3
3	Michael van Gerwen 98.63	3
Dimitri Van den Bergh 97.70	4
Q	Cameron Menzies 83.75	1
11	Nathan Aspinall 90.84	4

Quarter-finals (best of 7 sets); 2 February
1	Luke Humphries 104.24	4
8	Damon Heta 97.78	1
13	Danny Noppert 97.58	4
5	Stephen Bunting 101.28	3
2	Luke Littler 108.50	2
7	Jonny Clayton 103.96	4
Dimitri Van den Bergh 100.35	4
11	Nathan Aspinall 93.87	1

Semi-finals (best of 9 sets); 2 February
1	Luke Humphries 99.71	5
13	Danny Noppert 88.33	2
7	Jonny Clayton 90.51	5
Dimitri Van den Bergh 85.19	2

Final (best of 11 sets); 2 February
1	Luke Humphries 100.42	6
7	Jonny Clayton 98.25	5

== Highest averages ==
This table shows all averages over 100 achieved by players throughout the tournament. For players with multiple high averages, this is indicated by the number in brackets.

The three-dart average is the most cited statistic in darts matches as it gives a rough estimate of a player's form. For comparison with previous years, see the highest ever recorded averages in the World Masters.

World Masters Main Draw
Player	Round	Average	Opponent	Result
Jonny Clayton	1	112.77	Martin Schindler	Won
Luke Littler	QF	108.50	Jonny Clayton	Lost
Luke Littler (2)	2	105.47	James Wade	Won
Martin Schindler	1	105.05	Jonny Clayton	Lost
Luke Littler (3)	1	104.33	Andy Baetens	Won
Luke Humphries	QF	104.24	Damon Heta	Won
Jonny Clayton (2)	QF	103.96	Luke Littler	Won
Nathan Aspinall	1	103.77	Andrew Gilding	Won
Rob Cross	1	103.19	William O'Connor	Lost
Dimitri Van den Bergh	1	102.43	Gary Anderson	Won
Peter Wright	1	101.28	Kevin Doets	Won
Andrew Gilding	1	101.28	Nathan Aspinall	Lost
Stephen Bunting	QF	101.28	Danny Noppert	Lost
Luke Humphries (2)	F	100.42	Jonny Clayton	Won
Dimitri Van den Bergh (2)	QF	100.35	Nathan Aspinall	Won
Gary Anderson	1	100.03	Dimitri Van den Bergh	Lost

The preliminary draw had 129 players participating. 16 different players achieved over 100 on three-dart average during the preliminaries. The preliminaries were only available to watch on PDCTV, which makes these averages non-televised.

World Masters Preliminary Draw
Player	Round	Average	Opponent	Result
Berry van Peer	GS	117.88	Christian Kist	Won
Florian Hempel	1	110.57	Mensur Suljović	Won
Cameron Menzies	3	106.16	Gian van Veen	Won
Gian van Veen	2	106.01	Wessel Nijman	Won
Adam Hunt	GS	103.66	Lee Cocks	Won
Nathan Girvan	GS	103.66	Max Hopp	Won
Kieran Thompson	GS	102.49	Kai Gotthardt	Won
Wessel Nijman	1	101.90	Pero Ljubić	Won
William Borland	1	101.63	Dirk van Duijvenbode	Won
Jeffrey de Graaf	GS	101.13	Tytus Kanik	Won
Andy Baetens	3	100.87	Darius Labanauskas	Won
Callan Rydz	1	100.76	Jimmy van Schie	Loss
Wessel Nijman (2)	2	100.71	Gian van Veen	Loss
George Killington	GS	100.20	Wesley Plaisier	Won
Marvin van Velzen	GS	100.20	Dennie Olde Kalter	Won
Thibault Tricole	GS	100.20	Kieran Thompson	Won
Krzysztof Ratajski	2	100.19	Keane Barry	Won

== Media coverage ==
The main tournament was broadcast on ITV4 in the United Kingdom, DAZN in Germany, Austria and Switzerland, Viaplay in the Netherlands, FanDuel in the United States, Fox Sports in Australia. The preliminary round was offered on the PDC.tv live streaming platform.
