= PDC World Masters =

Tournament information
- Venue: Arena MK
- Location: Milton Keynes
- Country: Scotland (2013–2014); England (since 2015)
- Established: 2013
- Organisation(s): Professional Darts Corporation (PDC)
- Format: Legs (2013–2024), Sets (2025–)
- Prize fund: £500,000 (2025)
- Month(s) Played: November (2013–14); January/February (2015–present)

Current champion(s)
- Luke Littler (ENG)

The PDC World Masters, known for sponsorship purposes as the Winmau World Masters and formerly known as simply the Masters, is a professional darts tournament organised by the Professional Darts Corporation (PDC). The tournament was introduced in 2013 and has been held at Arena MK in Milton Keynes, England, since 2015. Since the 2025 edition, the tournament has featured the top 24 darts players according to the PDC Order of Merit, plus eight qualifiers from a preliminary round to complete a 32-player field.

== History ==
The inaugural edition of The Masters, held in 2013, was won by Phil Taylor, who defeated Adrian Lewis 10–1 in the final. James Wade won the following year by defeating Mervyn King 11–10 in the 2014 final. Michael van Gerwen became the third different champion in three years when he defeated Raymond van Barneveld 11–6.

In 2013 and 2014, the tournament took place in the Royal Highland Centre in Edinburgh, Scotland and was played in early November. However, the tournament was moved to early February in 2015 and had a new venue at Arena MK (renamed Marshall Arena in 2019) in Milton Keynes, England. The tournament has been held in late January/early February ever since.

In 2024, the PDC announced The Masters would get rebranded into the "Winmau World Masters" for the 2025 edition, emulating the World Masters tournament organised by the British Darts Organisation and later the World Darts Federation which was also sponsored by Winmau.

== Format ==
From 2013 to 2020, the tournament featured the Top 16 of the PDC Order of Merit, in a fixed draw (1 plays 16, 2 plays 15 and so on). The first round and the quarter-finals were played over best of 19 legs, the semi-finals and the final were played over best of 21 legs.

For the 2021 tournament, the participants increased from the Top 16 to the Top 24, with the Top 8 automatically going to the second round and the players ranked 9 to 24 playing in the first round over best of 11 legs.

From the 2025 tournament, the field expanded to 32 players, with the Top 16 being seeded in the first round and drawn to play the players ranked 17 to 24 and eight more qualifiers. The eight qualifiers are determined through a preliminary round held the day before the main tournament, featuring the remaining PDC Tour Card holders and players from the PDC's affiliated tours. The 2025 tournament also saw the introduction of set play, with all sets being played to the best of three legs.

== Masters finals ==
Year	Champion (average in final)	Score	Runner-up (average in final)	Prize money			Sponsor	Venue
Year	Champion (average in final)	Score	Runner-up (average in final)	Total	Champion	Runner-up	Sponsor	Venue
The Masters (non-ranking event)
2013	(England) Phil Taylor (108.50)	10–1 (l)	(England) Adrian Lewis (100.03)	£160,000	£50,000	£20,000	Coral	(Scotland) Royal Highland Centre, Edinburgh
2014	(England) James Wade (91.39)	11–10 (l)	(England) Mervyn King (92.15)	£160,000	£50,000	£20,000	Unibet	(Scotland) Royal Highland Centre, Edinburgh
2015	(Netherlands) Michael van Gerwen (112.49)	11–6 (l)	(Netherlands) Raymond van Barneveld (96.13)	£200,000	£60,000	£25,000	Unibet	(England) Arena MK, Milton Keynes (known as Marshall Arena from 2018 to 2025)
2016	(Netherlands) Michael van Gerwen (98.94)	11–6 (l)	(England) Dave Chisnall (96.71)	£200,000	£60,000	£25,000	Unibet	(England) Arena MK, Milton Keynes (known as Marshall Arena from 2018 to 2025)
2017	(Netherlands) Michael van Gerwen (109.42)	11–7 (l)	(Scotland) Gary Anderson (103.58)	£200,000	£60,000	£25,000	Unibet	(England) Arena MK, Milton Keynes (known as Marshall Arena from 2018 to 2025)
2018	(Netherlands) Michael van Gerwen (105.85)	11–9 (l)	(Netherlands) Raymond van Barneveld (100.55)	£200,000	£60,000	£25,000	Unibet	(England) Arena MK, Milton Keynes (known as Marshall Arena from 2018 to 2025)
2019	(Netherlands) Michael van Gerwen (99.82)	11–5 (l)	(England) James Wade (87.44)	£200,000	£60,000	£25,000	BetVictor	(England) Arena MK, Milton Keynes (known as Marshall Arena from 2018 to 2025)
2020	(Scotland) Peter Wright (95.01)	11–10 (l)	(England) Michael Smith (89.71)	£200,000	£60,000	£25,000	Ladbrokes	(England) Arena MK, Milton Keynes (known as Marshall Arena from 2018 to 2025)
2021	(Wales) Jonny Clayton (104.10)	11–8 (l)	(England) Mervyn King (94.95)	£220,000	£60,000	£25,000	Ladbrokes	(England) Arena MK, Milton Keynes (known as Marshall Arena from 2018 to 2025)
2022	Joe Cullen (96.89)	11–9 (l)	Dave Chisnall (90.23)	£220,000	£60,000	£25,000	Ladbrokes	(England) Arena MK, Milton Keynes (known as Marshall Arena from 2018 to 2025)
2023	(England) Chris Dobey (94.05)	11–7 (l)	(England) Rob Cross (90.20)	£275,000	£65,000	£30,000	Cazoo	(England) Arena MK, Milton Keynes (known as Marshall Arena from 2018 to 2025)
2024	(England) Stephen Bunting (102.50)	11–7 (l)	(Netherlands) Michael van Gerwen (98.27)	£275,000	£65,000	£30,000	Cazoo	(England) Arena MK, Milton Keynes (known as Marshall Arena from 2018 to 2025)
World Masters (ranking event)
2025	(England) Luke Humphries (100.42)	6–5 (s)	(Wales) Jonny Clayton (98.25)	£500,000	£100,000	£50,000	Winmau	(England) Arena MK, Milton Keynes
2026	(England) Luke Littler (104.72)	6–5 (s)	(England) Luke Humphries (105.51)	£500,000	£100,000	£50,000	Winmau	(England) Arena MK, Milton Keynes

== Records and statistics ==
As of 2026, Michael van Gerwen, James Wade and Dave Chisnall are the only players to appear in all 14 editions of the Masters.

As of 1 February 2026.

=== Total finalist appearances ===
Rank	Player	Nationality	Won	Runner-up	Finals	Appearances
1	**Michael van Gerwen**	Netherlands	5	1	6	14
2	**James Wade**	England	1	1	2	14
2	**Jonny Clayton**	Wales	1	1	2	8
2	**Luke Humphries**	England	1	1	2	5
5	Phil Taylor	England	1	0	1	5
5	**Peter Wright**	Scotland	1	0	1	13
5	**Joe Cullen**	England	1	0	1	8
5	**Chris Dobey**	England	1	0	1	5
5	**Stephen Bunting**	England	1	0	1	8
5	**Luke Littler**	England	1	0	1	2
11	**Raymond van Barneveld**	Netherlands	0	2	2	6
11	**Mervyn King**	England	0	2	2	5
11	**Dave Chisnall**	England	0	2	2	14
14	Adrian Lewis	England	0	1	1	8
14	**Gary Anderson**	Scotland	0	1	1	11
14	**Michael Smith**	England	0	1	1	10
14	**Rob Cross**	England	0	1	1	9

- Active players are shown in **bold**
- Only players who reached the final are included
- In the event of identical records, players are sorted by date first achieved

=== Champions by country ===
Country	Players	Total	First title	Last title
England	7	7	2013	2026
Netherlands	1	5	2015	2019
Scotland	1	1	2020	2020
Wales	1	1	2021	2021

=== High averages ===
Masters highest one-match averages
Average	Player	Year (+ round)	Opponent	Result (Note: (l) = score in legs, (s) = score in sets.)
112.77	(Wales) Jonny Clayton	2025, first round	(Germany) Martin Schindler	3–1 (s)
112.49	(Netherlands) Michael van Gerwen	2015, final	(Netherlands) Raymond van Barneveld	11–6 (l)
112.32	(England) Rob Cross	2023, second round	(Scotland) Gary Anderson	10–6 (l)
112.20	(Netherlands) Michael van Gerwen	2016, first round	(England) Stephen Bunting	10–1 (l)
111.17	(Scotland) Gary Anderson	2023, second round	(England) Rob Cross	6–10 (l)
111.14	(Netherlands) Michael van Gerwen	2018, quarter-final	(England) James Wade	10–2 (l)
110.28	(Netherlands) Michael van Gerwen	2015, quarter-final	(England) Dave Chisnall	10–9 (l)
110.05	(England) Phil Taylor	2014, first round	(England) Wes Newton	10–4 (l)
109.74	(Scotland) Gary Anderson	2017, first round	(Netherlands) Benito van de Pas	10–3 (l)
109.42	(Netherlands) Michael van Gerwen	2017, final	(Scotland) Gary Anderson	11–7 (l)

Masters highest one-match losing averages
Average	Player	Year (+ round)	Opponent	Result
111.17	(Scotland) Gary Anderson	2023, second round	(England) Rob Cross	6–10 (l)
108.50	(England) Luke Littler	2025, quarter-final	(Wales) Jonny Clayton	2–4 (s)
108.09	(England) Dave Chisnall	2015, quarter-final	(Netherlands) Michael van Gerwen	9–10 (l)
106.95	(England) Adrian Lewis	2014, quarter-final	(England) James Wade	6–10 (l)
106.48	(England) Dave Chisnall	2018, first round	(Netherlands) Raymond van Barneveld	9–10 (l)

Different players with a 100+ match average (Updated 01/02/26)
Player	Total	Highest Av.	Year (+ round)
(Netherlands) Michael van Gerwen	20	112.49	2015, final
(Scotland) Gary Anderson	10	111.17	2023, second round
(England) Phil Taylor	10	110.05	2014, first round
(Wales) Jonny Clayton	9	112.77	2025, first round
(Scotland) Peter Wright	8	104.72	2021, quarter-finals
(England) Luke Littler	7	108.50	2025, quarter-final
(England) Luke Humphries	7	107.80	2026, semi-final
(England) Dave Chisnall	6	109.26	2024, first round
(Netherlands) Raymond van Barneveld	6	103.51	2018, quarter-finals
(England) Adrian Lewis	5	107.93	2013, quarter-finals
(England) James Wade	5	105.56	2014, semi-finals
(England) Michael Smith	5	105.49	2022, second round
(Wales) Gerwyn Price	4	108.51	2026, first round
(Austria) Mensur Suljović	4	106.12	2019, first round
(England) Stephen Bunting	4	102.50	2024, final
(England) Rob Cross	3	112.32	2023, second round
(England) Joe Cullen	3	106.30	2022, second round
(Belgium) Dimitri Van den Bergh	3	105.31	2022, first round
(England) Mervyn King	3	101.97	2021, first round
(England) Luke Woodhouse	2	108.64	2026, first round
(Australia) Simon Whitlock	2	105.90	2021, second round
(England) Nathan Aspinall	2	105.80	2026, first round
(Germany) Martin Schindler	2	105.05	2025, first round
(Australia) Damon Heta	2	102.96	2024, second round
(Netherlands) Gian van Veen	2	102.93	2026, semi-final
(Belgium) Kim Huybrechts	1	106.43	2013, first round
(England) Ross Smith	1	102.14	2026, second round
(England) Ian White	1	101.78	2022, first round
(Northern Ireland) Josh Rock	1	101.66	2026, second round
(Portugal) José de Sousa	1	101.29	2021, first round
(England) Andrew Gilding	1	101.26	2025, first round
(England) James Hurrell	1	101.10	2026, first round
(England) Justin Pipe	1	100.40	2014, first round
(Netherlands) Vincent van der Voort	1	100.14	2016, first round

== Media coverage ==
The Masters is broadcast by ITV4 in the United Kingdom, DAZN in Germany, Austria and Switzerland, and Viaplay in the Netherlands. The preliminary rounds are also broadcast on pdc.tv.
