= 2017 Masters (darts) =

2017 Unibet Masters

Tournament information
- Dates: 27–29 January 2017
- Venue: Arena MK
- Location: Milton Keynes, England
- Organisation(s): Professional Darts Corporation (PDC)
- Format: Legs; Final: best of 21 legs
- Prize fund: £200,000
- Winner's share: £60,000
- High checkout: 170 Raymond van Barneveld

Champion(s)
- Michael van Gerwen (NED)

The 2017 PDC Masters (known for sponsorship reasons as the 2017 Unibet Masters) was the fifth staging of the non-ranking Masters darts tournament, held by the Professional Darts Corporation (PDC). It was held from 27 to 29 January 2017 at the Arena MK in Milton Keynes, England.

Michael van Gerwen was the defending champion by beating Dave Chisnall 11–6 in 2016, and successfully defended his title, winning his third Masters title in a row, after defeating Gary Anderson 11–7 in the final.

== Qualifiers ==
The Masters only features the top 16 players in the PDC Order of Merit. The following players comprised the top 16 of the PDC Order of Merit after the 2017 PDC World Darts Championship:

1. (Netherlands) Michael van Gerwen (winner)
2. (Scotland) Gary Anderson (runner-up)
3. (Scotland) Peter Wright (quarter-finals)
4. (England) Adrian Lewis (semi-finals)
5. (England) James Wade (first round)
6. (England) Phil Taylor (semi-finals)
7. (England) Dave Chisnall (first round)
8. (Austria) Mensur Suljović (quarter-finals)
9. (Netherlands) Jelle Klaasen (first round)
10. (Netherlands) Raymond van Barneveld (quarter-finals)
11. (England) Michael Smith (first round)
12. (Scotland) Robert Thornton (quarter-finals)
13. (Belgium) Kim Huybrechts (first round)
14. (England) Ian White (first round)
15. (Netherlands) Benito van de Pas (first round)
16. (Australia) Simon Whitlock (first round)

== Prize money ==
The prize money is £200,000 in total. The prize money is the same as in 2016.

Stage (no. of players)		Prize money (Total: £200,000)
Winner	(1)	£60,000
Runner-up	(1)	£25,000
Semi-finalists	(2)	£17,500
Quarter-finalists	(4)	£10,000
First round losers	(8)	£5,000

== Draw ==
First round (best of 19 legs); 27–28 January
1	(Netherlands) Michael van Gerwen 105.42	10
16	(Australia) Simon Whitlock 99.43	6
8	(Austria) Mensur Suljović 100.40	10
9	(Netherlands) Jelle Klaasen 92.98	4
4	(England) Adrian Lewis 102.16	10
13	(Belgium) Kim Huybrechts 93.77	6
5	(England) James Wade 91.57	9
12	(Scotland) Robert Thornton 92.91	10
2	(Scotland) Gary Anderson 109.74	10
15	(Netherlands) Benito van de Pas 93.89	3
7	(England) Dave Chisnall 96.59	5
10	(Netherlands) Raymond van Barneveld 99.48	10
3	(Scotland) Peter Wright 96.56	10
14	(England) Ian White 95.65	5
6	(England) Phil Taylor 104.80	10
11	(England) Michael Smith 100.42	6

Quarter-finals (best of 19 legs); 29 January
1	(Netherlands) Michael van Gerwen 107.75	10
8	(Austria) Mensur Suljović 103.34	4
4	(England) Adrian Lewis 104.77	10
12	(Scotland) Robert Thornton 95.49	6
2	(Scotland) Gary Anderson 106.50	10
10	(Netherlands) Raymond van Barneveld 100.21	6
3	(Scotland) Peter Wright 94.68	5
6	(England) Phil Taylor 100.14	10

Semi-finals (best of 21 legs); 29 January
1	(Netherlands) Michael van Gerwen 101.69	11
4	(England) Adrian Lewis 89.23	5
2	(Scotland) Gary Anderson 102.12	11
6	(England) Phil Taylor 98.03	9

Final (best of 21 legs); 29 January
1	(Netherlands) Michael van Gerwen 109.42	11
2	(Scotland) Gary Anderson 103.58	7
