= 2019 Masters (darts) =

Seventh staging of the Masters darts tournament of the PDC

2019 BetVictor Masters

Tournament information
- Dates: 1–3 February 2019
- Venue: Arena MK
- Location: Milton Keynes, England
- Organisation(s): Professional Darts Corporation (PDC)
- Format: Legs; Final: best of 21 legs
- Prize fund: £200,000
- Winner's share: £60,000
- High checkout: Michael van Gerwen (×2)

Champion(s)
- Michael van Gerwen (NED)

The 2019 PDC Masters (known for sponsorship reasons as the 2019 BetVictor Masters) was the seventh staging of the non-ranking Masters darts tournament, held by the Professional Darts Corporation (PDC). It was held from 1 to 3 February 2019 at Arena MK in Milton Keynes, England.

Michael van Gerwen was the four-time defending champion, after defeating Raymond van Barneveld 11–9 in the 2018 final.

He successfully defended his title, beating James Wade 11–7 in the final and therefore winning the event for the fifth consecutive time and extending his unbeaten run to 20 matches in the Masters.

== Qualifiers ==
The Masters only features the top 16 players in the PDC Order of Merit after the 2019 PDC World Darts Championship:. Darren Webster, Joe Cullen, and Jonny Clayton made their debuts in the event, while Adrian Lewis returned after a one-year absence. World number four Gary Anderson withdrew with a back injury and was replaced in the draw by seventeenth-ranked Stephen Bunting, who therefore qualified for the first time since 2016.

The following 16 players took part in the tournament:

1. (Netherlands) Michael van Gerwen (champion)
2. (England) Rob Cross (first round)
3. (Scotland) Peter Wright (semi-finals)
4. (Scotland) ~~Gary Anderson~~ (withdrew)
5. (Northern Ireland) Daryl Gurney (first round)
6. (England) Michael Smith (quarter-finals)
7. (Wales) Gerwyn Price (first round)
8. (Austria) Mensur Suljović (quarter-finals)
9. (Australia) Simon Whitlock (first round)
10. (England) James Wade (runner-up)
11. (England) Ian White (first round)
12. (England) Dave Chisnall (semi-finals)
13. (England) Darren Webster (first round)
14. (England) Adrian Lewis (first round)
15. (England) Joe Cullen (quarter-finals)
16. (Wales) Jonny Clayton (first round)
17. (England) Stephen Bunting (quarter-finals)

== Prize money ==
The prize money was £200,000 in total, which was the same as in 2018.

Stage (no. of players)		Prize money (Total: £200,000)
Winner	(1)	£60,000
Runner-up	(1)	£25,000
Semi-finalists	(2)	£17,500
Quarter-finalists	(4)	£10,000
First round losers	(8)	£5,000

== Draw ==
First round (best of 19 legs); 1–2 February
1	(Netherlands) Michael van Gerwen 99.12	10
16	(Wales) Jonny Clayton 89.92	5
8	(Austria) Mensur Suljović 106.12	10
9	(Australia) Simon Whitlock 87.50	1
5	(Northern Ireland) Daryl Gurney 93.90	8
12	(England) Dave Chisnall 97.56	10
Alt/17	(England) Stephen Bunting 86.58	10
13	(England) Darren Webster 86.67	9
2	(England) Rob Cross 97.70	6
15	(England) Joe Cullen 94.89	10
7	(Wales) Gerwyn Price 94.27	7
10	(England) James Wade 86.80	10
6	(England) Michael Smith 101.41	10
11	(England) Ian White 92.15	5
3	(Scotland) Peter Wright 89.46	10
14	(England) Adrian Lewis 92.20	9

Quarter-finals (best of 19 legs); 3 February (afternoon)
1	(Netherlands) Michael van Gerwen 102.92	10
8	(Austria) Mensur Suljović 96.76	5
12	(England) Dave Chisnall 99.74	10
Alt/17	(England) Stephen Bunting 93.31	4
15	(England) Joe Cullen 91.76	6
10	(England) James Wade 95.37	10
6	(England) Michael Smith 94.96	6
3	(Scotland) Peter Wright 95.07	10

Semi-finals (best of 21 legs); 3 February (evening)
1	(Netherlands) Michael van Gerwen 100.05	11
12	(England) Dave Chisnall 93.31	7
10	(England) James Wade 94.45	11
3	(Scotland) Peter Wright 98.17	9

Final (best of 21 legs); 3 February (evening)
1	(Netherlands) Michael van Gerwen 99.82	11
10	(England) James Wade 87.44	5
