= 2016 Masters (darts) =

2016 Unibet Masters

Tournament information
- Dates: 30–31 January 2016
- Venue: Arena MK
- Location: Milton Keynes, England
- Organisation(s): Professional Darts Corporation (PDC)
- Format: Legs; Final: best of 21 legs
- Prize fund: £200,000
- Winner's share: £60,000
- High checkout: 161; Peter Wright; Michael van Gerwen

Champion(s)
- Michael van Gerwen (NED)

The 2016 PDC Masters (known for sponsorship reasons as the 2016 Unibet Masters) was the fourth staging of the non-ranking Masters darts tournament, held by the Professional Darts Corporation. It was held between 30 and 31 January 2016 at the Arena MK in Milton Keynes, England.

Michael van Gerwen retained his 2015 title, beating Dave Chisnall 11–6 in the tournament's final.

== Qualifiers ==
The Masters only features the top 16 players in the PDC Order of Merit. These are:

1. (Netherlands) Michael van Gerwen (winner)
2. (Scotland) Gary Anderson (first round)
3. (England) Adrian Lewis (first round)
4. (England) Phil Taylor (semi-finals)
5. (Scotland) Peter Wright (quarter-finals)
6. (England) James Wade (semi-finals)
7. (Scotland) Robert Thornton (first round)
8. (England) Michael Smith (quarter-finals)
9. (Netherlands) Raymond van Barneveld (first round)
10. (England) Dave Chisnall (runner-up)
11. (England) Terry Jenkins (first round)
12. (England) Ian White (first round)
13. (Netherlands) Jelle Klaasen (first round)
14. (Belgium) Kim Huybrechts (quarter-finals)
15. (Netherlands) Vincent van der Voort (quarter-finals)
16. (England) Stephen Bunting (first round)

== Prize money ==
The total prize fund is £200,000.

| Stage (no. of players) | | Prize money (Total: £200,000) |
|---|---|---|
| Winner | (1) | £60,000 |
| Runner-up | (1) | £25,000 |
| Semi-finalists | (2) | £17,500 |
| Quarter-finalists | (4) | £10,000 |
| First round losers | (8) | £5,000 |

== Draw ==
First round (best of 19 legs); 30 January
1 | (Netherlands) Michael van Gerwen 112.20 | 10
16 | (England) Stephen Bunting 94.35 | 1
8 | (England) Michael Smith 90.93 | 10
9 | (Netherlands) Raymond van Barneveld 86.83 | 7
4 | (England) Phil Taylor 102.03 | 10
13 | (Netherlands) Jelle Klaasen 97.29 | 6
5 | (Scotland) Peter Wright 100.15 | 10
12 | (England) Ian White 96.89 | 7
2 | (Scotland) Gary Anderson 98.18 | 7
15 | (Netherlands) Vincent van der Voort 100.14 | 10
7 | (Scotland) Robert Thornton 87.94 | 9
10 | (England) Dave Chisnall 90.33 | 10
3 | (England) Adrian Lewis 90.53 | 4
14 | (Belgium) Kim Huybrechts 94.29 | 10
6 | (England) James Wade 91.41 | 10
11 | (England) Terry Jenkins 89.62 | 8

Quarter-finals (best of 19 legs); 31 January
1 | (Netherlands) Michael van Gerwen 105.86 | 10
8 | (England) Michael Smith 92.35 | 3
4 | (England) Phil Taylor 104.48 | 10
5 | (Scotland) Peter Wright 104.36 | 9
15 | (Netherlands) Vincent van der Voort 93.16 | 4
10 | (England) Dave Chisnall 104.40 | 10
14 | (Belgium) Kim Huybrechts 91.71 | 5
6 | (England) James Wade 91.64 | 10

Semi-finals (best of 21 legs); 31 January
1 | (Netherlands) Michael van Gerwen 103.30 | 11
4 | (England) Phil Taylor 103.45 | 10
10 | (England) Dave Chisnall 99.18 | 11
6 | (England) James Wade 93.77 | 6

Final (best of 21 legs); 31 January
1 | (Netherlands) Michael van Gerwen 98.94 | 11
10 | (England) Dave Chisnall 96.71 | 6
