= 2018 Masters (darts) =

2018 Unibet Masters

Tournament information
- Dates: 26–28 January 2018
- Venue: Arena MK
- Location: Milton Keynes, England
- Organisation(s): Professional Darts Corporation (PDC)
- Format: Legs; Final: best of 21 legs
- Prize fund: £200,000
- Winner's share: £60,000
- High checkout: 167 Rob Cross

Champion(s)
- Michael van Gerwen (NED)

The 2018 PDC Masters (known for sponsorship reasons as the 2018 Unibet Masters) was the sixth staging of the non-ranking Masters darts tournament, held by the Professional Darts Corporation (PDC). It was held from 26 to 28 January 2018 at the Arena MK in Milton Keynes, England.

Michael van Gerwen was the defending champion, after defeating Gary Anderson 11–7 in the 2017 final, and he successfully retained his title, by beating Raymond van Barneveld 11–9 in the final. It was Van Gerwen's fourth consecutive Masters title.

== Qualifiers ==
The Masters only features the top 16 players in the PDC Order of Merit. The following players comprised the top 16 of the PDC Order of Merit after the 2018 PDC World Darts Championship, with the exception of Phil Taylor, who despite being #4 in the rankings, had announced his retirement, following the final of the World Championship:

1. (Netherlands) Michael van Gerwen (winner)
2. (Scotland) Peter Wright (quarter-finals)
3. (England) Rob Cross (quarter-finals)
4. (Scotland) Gary Anderson (semi-finals)
5. (Northern Ireland) Daryl Gurney (first round)
6. (Austria) Mensur Suljović (semi-finals)
7. (England) Dave Chisnall (first round)
8. (Australia) Simon Whitlock (first round)
9. (England) James Wade (quarter-finals)
10. (Netherlands) Raymond van Barneveld (runner-up)
11. (England) Michael Smith (first round)
12. (Wales) Gerwyn Price (quarter-finals)
13. (Netherlands) Benito van de Pas (first round)
14. (England) Ian White (first round)
15. (England) Alan Norris (first round)
16. (Belgium) Kim Huybrechts (first round)

== Prize money ==
The prize money is £200,000 in total. The prize money is the same as in 2017.

Stage (no. of players)		Prize money (Total: £200,000)
Winner	(1)	£60,000
Runner-up	(1)	£25,000
Semi-finalists	(2)	£17,500
Quarter-finalists	(4)	£10,000
First round losers	(8)	£5,000

== Draw ==
First round (best of 19 legs); 26–27 January
1	(Netherlands) Michael van Gerwen 102.68	10
16	(Belgium) Kim Huybrechts 96.96	6
8	(Australia) Simon Whitlock 97.18	8
9	(England) James Wade 95.79	10
5	(Northern Ireland) Daryl Gurney 96.90	7
12	(Wales) Gerwyn Price 98.72	10
4	(Scotland) Gary Anderson 90.55	10
13	(Netherlands) Benito van de Pas 82.78	4
2	(Scotland) Peter Wright 97.76	10
15	(England) Alan Norris 88.87	5
7	(England) Dave Chisnall 106.48	9
10	(Netherlands) Raymond van Barneveld 101.09	10
6	(Austria) Mensur Suljović 99.89	10
11	(England) Michael Smith 96.93	8
3	(England) Rob Cross 102.08	10
14	(England) Ian White 92.90	3

Quarter-finals (best of 19 legs); 28 January
1	(Netherlands) Michael van Gerwen 111.14	10
9	(England) James Wade 97.81	2
12	(Wales) Gerwyn Price 92.63	6
4	(Scotland) Gary Anderson 94.38	10
2	(Scotland) Peter Wright 98.85	2
10	(Netherlands) Raymond van Barneveld 103.51	10
6	(Austria) Mensur Suljović 101.40	10
3	(England) Rob Cross 99.00	8

Semi-finals (best of 21 legs); 28 January
1	(Netherlands) Michael van Gerwen 101.96	11
4	(Scotland) Gary Anderson 95.44	5
10	(Netherlands) Raymond van Barneveld 94.52	11
6	(Austria) Mensur Suljović 90.41	7

Final (best of 21 legs); 28 January
1	(Netherlands) Michael van Gerwen 105.85	11
10	(Netherlands) Raymond van Barneveld 100.55	9
