= 2020 Masters (darts) =

Eighth staging of the Masters darts tournament of the PDC

2020 Ladbrokes Masters

Tournament information
- Dates: 31 January – 2 February 2020
- Venue: Arena MK
- Location: Milton Keynes, England
- Organisation(s): Professional Darts Corporation (PDC)
- Format: Legs; Final: best of 21 legs
- Prize fund: £200,000
- Winner's share: £60,000
- High checkout: 164 Michael van Gerwen

Champion(s)
- Peter Wright (SCO)

The 2020 PDC Masters (known for sponsorship reasons as the 2020 Ladbrokes Masters) was the eighth staging of the non-ranking Masters darts tournament, held by the Professional Darts Corporation (PDC). It was held from 31 January to 2 February 2020 at Arena MK in Milton Keynes, England.

Michael van Gerwen was the five-time defending champion, after defeating James Wade 11–5 in the 2019 final. However, he was beaten in the Masters for the first time since 2014, losing 10–6 to Jonny Clayton in the first round, and losing his 20-match unbeaten streak at the Marshall Arena.

Peter Wright won the tournament for the first time and extended his unbeaten streak in all competitions to 10 matches. He beat Michael Smith 11–10 in the final, with Smith missing 3 darts to win the title himself.

== Qualifiers ==
The Masters featured the top 16 players in the PDC Order of Merit after the 2020 PDC World Darts Championship. Nathan Aspinall made his debut in the event.

The following 16 players took part in the tournament:

1. (Netherlands) Michael van Gerwen (first round)
2. (Scotland) Peter Wright (winner)
3. (Wales) Gerwyn Price (quarter-finals)
4. (England) Rob Cross (first round)
5. (England) Michael Smith (runner-up)
6. (Scotland) Gary Anderson (semi-finals)
7. (Northern Ireland) Daryl Gurney (first round)
8. (England) Nathan Aspinall (semi-finals)
9. (England) James Wade (first round)
10. (England) Dave Chisnall (quarter-finals)
11. (England) Ian White (first round)
12. (Austria) Mensur Suljović (first round)
13. (England) Adrian Lewis (quarter-finals)
14. (Australia) Simon Whitlock (first round)
15. (England) Joe Cullen (first round)
16. (Wales) Jonny Clayton (quarter-finals)

== Prize money ==
The prize money was £200,000 in total, which was the same as in 2019.

Stage (no. of players)		Prize money (Total: £200,000)
Winner	(1)	£60,000
Runner-up	(1)	£25,000
Semi-finalists	(2)	£17,500
Quarter-finalists	(4)	£10,000
First round losers	(8)	£5,000

== Draw ==
First round (best of 19 legs); 31 January–1 February
1	(Netherlands) Michael van Gerwen 94.24	6
16	(Wales) Jonny Clayton 93.75	10
8	(England) Nathan Aspinall 90.67	10
9	(England) James Wade 87.55	4
4	(England) Rob Cross 83.81	5
13	(England) Adrian Lewis 87.80	10
5	(England) Michael Smith 101.85	10
12	(Austria) Mensur Suljović 97.95	6
2	(Scotland) Peter Wright 103.55	10
15	(England) Joe Cullen 94.60	7
7	(Northern Ireland) Daryl Gurney 93.98	8
10	(England) Dave Chisnall 92.92	10
3	(Wales) Gerwyn Price 98.16	10
14	(Australia) Simon Whitlock 97.57	9
6	(Scotland) Gary Anderson 97.15	10
11	(England) Ian White 88.67	8

Quarter-finals (best of 19 legs); 2 February (afternoon)
16	(Wales) Jonny Clayton 95.53	8
8	(England) Nathan Aspinall 95.00	10
13	(England) Adrian Lewis 92.47	6
5	(England) Michael Smith 88.04	10
2	(Scotland) Peter Wright 97.60	10
10	(England) Dave Chisnall 78.94	0
3	(Wales) Gerwyn Price 99.53	2
6	(Scotland) Gary Anderson 102.39	10

Semi-finals (best of 21 legs); 2 February (evening)
8	(England) Nathan Aspinall 92.40	10
5	(England) Michael Smith 92.48	11
2	(Scotland) Peter Wright 98.86	11
6	(Scotland) Gary Anderson 96.85	7

Final (best of 21 legs); 2 February (evening)
5	(England) Michael Smith 90.28	10
2	(Scotland) Peter Wright 95.01	11
