= 2015 Masters (darts) =

2015 Unibet Masters

Tournament information
- Dates: 31 January–1 February 2015
- Venue: Arena MK
- Location: Milton Keynes, England
- Organisation(s): Professional Darts Corporation (PDC)
- Format: Legs; Final: best of 21 legs
- Prize fund: £200,000
- Winner's share: £60,000
- High checkout: 167 Simon Whitlock

Champion(s)
- Michael van Gerwen (NED)

The 2015 PDC Masters (known for sponsorship reasons as the 2015 Unibet Masters) was the third staging of the non-ranking Masters darts tournament, held by the Professional Darts Corporation (PDC). It was played from 31 January to 1 February 2015 at Arena MK in Milton Keynes, England. This was the first time the tournament was held in the early months of the calendar year, in contrast to the two previous editions which were held in November.

James Wade was the defending champion, having beaten Mervyn King 11–10 in the 2014 tournament's final, but he lost in the quarter-finals to Gary Anderson.

Michael van Gerwen won his first Masters title by defeating Raymond van Barneveld 11–6 in the final, which he won with a tournament record average of 112.49 in the last game.

== Qualifiers ==
The tournament only featured the top 16 players in the PDC Order of Merit. These were:

1. (Netherlands) Michael van Gerwen (winner)
2. (England) Phil Taylor (first round)
3. (Scotland) Gary Anderson (semi-finals)
4. (England) Adrian Lewis (semi-finals)
5. (Scotland) Peter Wright (quarter-finals)
6. (England) James Wade (quarter-finals)
7. (Australia) Simon Whitlock (first round)
8. (Scotland) Robert Thornton (first round)
9. (England) Dave Chisnall (quarter-finals)
10. (Netherlands) Raymond van Barneveld (runner-up)
11. (England) Mervyn King (first round)
12. (Northern Ireland) Brendan Dolan (first round)
13. (England) Ian White (first round)
14. (England) Andy Hamilton (first round)
15. (England) Terry Jenkins (quarter-finals)
16. (England) Wes Newton (first round)

== Prize money ==
The total prize fund was £200,000.

Stage (no. of players)		Prize money (Total: £200,000)
Winner	(1)	£60,000
Runner-up	(1)	£25,000
Semi-finalists	(2)	£17,500
Quarter-finalists	(4)	£10,000
First round losers	(8)	£5,000

== Draw ==
First round (best of 19 legs); 31 January
1	(Netherlands) Michael van Gerwen 93.89	10
16	(England) Wes Newton 91.26	5
8	(Scotland) Robert Thornton 94.43	5
9	(England) Dave Chisnall 106.30	10
5	(Scotland) Peter Wright 94.33	10
12	(Northern Ireland) Brendan Dolan 89.05	1
4	(England) Adrian Lewis 94.42	10
13	(England) Ian White 91.72	4
2	(England) Phil Taylor 93.74	7
15	(England) Terry Jenkins 91.84	10
7	(Australia) Simon Whitlock 89.73	7
10	(Netherlands) Raymond van Barneveld 92.63	10
6	(England) James Wade 96.85	10
11	(England) Mervyn King 80.46	3
3	(Scotland) Gary Anderson 89.75	10
14	(England) Andy Hamilton 83.17	2

Quarter-finals (best of 19 legs); 1 February
1	(Netherlands) Michael van Gerwen 110.28	10
9	(England) Dave Chisnall 108.09	9
5	(Scotland) Peter Wright 93.98	8
4	(England) Adrian Lewis 96.48	10
15	(England) Terry Jenkins 99.61	3
10	(Netherlands) Raymond van Barneveld 102.49	10
6	(England) James Wade 96.83	5
3	(Scotland) Gary Anderson 105.34	10

Semi-finals (best of 21 legs); 1 February
1	(Netherlands) Michael van Gerwen 97.90	11
4	(England) Adrian Lewis 96.11	6
10	(Netherlands) Raymond van Barneveld 95.25	11
3	(Scotland) Gary Anderson 94.67	6

Final (best of 21 legs); 1 February
1	(Netherlands) Michael van Gerwen 112.49	11
10	(Netherlands) Raymond van Barneveld 96.13	6
