= 2014 Masters (darts) =

2014 Unibet Masters

Tournament information
- Dates: 1–2 November 2014
- Venue: Royal Highland Centre
- Location: Edinburgh, Scotland
- Organisation(s): Professional Darts Corporation (PDC)
- Format: Legs; Final: best of 21 legs
- Prize fund: £160,000
- Winner's share: £50,000
- High checkout: 170 Michael van Gerwen

Champion(s)
- James Wade (ENG)

The 2014 PDC Masters (known for sponsorship reasons as the 2014 Unibet Masters) was the second staging of the non-ranking Masters darts tournament, held by the Professional Darts Corporation (PDC). It was held between 1–2 November 2014 at the Royal Highland Centre in Edinburgh, Scotland.

Phil Taylor was the defending champion, having beaten Adrian Lewis 10–1 in the inaugural tournament's final. James Wade beat Taylor 11–9 in the semi-finals. Wade got off to a slow start in the final against Mervyn King, and trailed 0–5, 1–6, 2–9 and 6–10. However, Wade won the last 5 legs to triumph 11–10, and win his first major title since the 2011 UK Open.

The match distance changed this year with the first round and quarter-finals best of 19 legs. The semi-finals and final also increased in distance to best of 21 legs.

== Qualifiers ==
Only the top 16 players on the PDC's Order of Merit on 19 October 2014 qualified for the event. These were:

1. (Netherlands) Michael van Gerwen (semi-finals)
2. (England) Phil Taylor (semi-finals)
3. (England) Adrian Lewis (quarter-finals)
4. (Scotland) Peter Wright (first round)
5. (Australia) Simon Whitlock (first round)
6. (England) James Wade (winner)
7. (Scotland) Gary Anderson (quarter-finals)
8. (England) Dave Chisnall (quarter-finals)
9. (Scotland) Robert Thornton (first round)
10. (England) Andy Hamilton (first round)
11. (Northern Ireland) Brendan Dolan (first round)
12. (England) Mervyn King (runner-up)
13. (England) Justin Pipe (quarter-finals)
14. (Belgium) Kim Huybrechts (first round)
15. (England) Wes Newton (first round)
16. (Netherlands) Raymond van Barneveld (first round)

== Prize money ==
The total prize fund was £160,000.

Stage (no. of players)		Prize money (Total: £160,000)
Winner	(1)	£50,000
Runner-up	(1)	£20,000
Semi-finalists	(2)	£10,000
Quarter-finalists	(4)	£7,500
First round losers	(8)	£5,000

== Draw ==
The draw was made on 20 October 2014.

First round (best of 19 legs); 1 November
1	(Netherlands) Michael van Gerwen 101.44	10
16	(Netherlands) Raymond van Barneveld 100.51	9
8	(England) Dave Chisnall 99.67	10
9	(Scotland) Robert Thornton 94.47	8
5	(Australia) Simon Whitlock 90.98	7
12	(England) Mervyn King 89.06	10
4	(Scotland) Peter Wright 94.72	7
13	(England) Justin Pipe 100.40	10
2	(England) Phil Taylor 110.05	10
15	(England) Wes Newton 91.84	4
7	(Scotland) Gary Anderson 104.49	10
10	(England) Andy Hamilton 94.49	7
6	(England) James Wade 97.22	10
11	(Northern Ireland) Brendan Dolan 94.25	5
3	(England) Adrian Lewis 98.03	10
14	(Belgium) Kim Huybrechts 84.78	4

Quarter-finals (best of 19 legs); 2 November
1	(Netherlands) Michael van Gerwen 99.11	10
8	(England) Dave Chisnall 98.62	7
12	(England) Mervyn King 96.22	10
13	(England) Justin Pipe 93.21	6
2	(England) Phil Taylor 98.55	10
7	(Scotland) Gary Anderson 95.08	6
6	(England) James Wade 104.65	10
3	(England) Adrian Lewis 106.95	6

Semi-finals (best of 21 legs); 2 November
1	(Netherlands) Michael van Gerwen 101.09	9
12	(England) Mervyn King 99.88	11
2	(England) Phil Taylor 104.64	9
6	(England) James Wade 105.56	11

Final (best of 21 legs); 2 November
12	(England) Mervyn King 92.15	10
6	(England) James Wade 91.39	11

== Broadcasting ==
The tournament was available in the following countries on these channels:

Country	Channel
United Kingdom	ITV4
Netherlands	RTL 7
Germany	Sport1/Sport1+
Belgium	Sporting Telenet
Australia	Fox Sports
(Republic of Ireland) Ireland	Setanta Sports
Middle East	OSN
Scandinavia	Viasat
