= 2013 Masters (darts) =

2013 Coral Masters

Tournament information
- Dates: 1–3 November 2013
- Venue: Royal Highland Centre
- Location: Edinburgh, Scotland
- Organisation(s): Professional Darts Corporation (PDC)
- Format: Legs; Final: best of 19 legs
- Prize fund: £160,000
- Winner's share: £50,000
- High checkout: 156 Adrian Lewis

Champion(s)
- Phil Taylor (ENG)

The 2013 PDC Masters (known for sponsorship reasons as the 2013 Coral Masters) was the inaugural staging of the non-ranking darts tournament, The Masters, organised by the Professional Darts Corporation (PDC). It was held from 1 to 3 November 2013 at the Royal Highland Centre in Edinburgh, Scotland.

Phil Taylor won the title by beating Adrian Lewis 10–1 in the final.

== Qualifiers ==
Only the top 16 players on the PDC Order of Merit on 20 October 2013 qualified for the event. These were:

1. (England) Phil Taylor (winner)
2. (Netherlands) Michael van Gerwen (quarter-finals)
3. (England) Adrian Lewis (runner-up)
4. (Australia) Simon Whitlock (quarter-finals)
5. (England) James Wade (semi-finals)
6. (England) Andy Hamilton (first round)
7. (England) Dave Chisnall (first round)
8. (England) Wes Newton (quarter-finals)
9. (England) Justin Pipe (first round)
10. (Netherlands) Raymond van Barneveld (semi-finals)
11. (Scotland) Robert Thornton (quarter-finals)
12. (England) Kevin Painter (first round)
13. (England) Mervyn King (first round)
14. (Belgium) Kim Huybrechts (first round)
15. (Scotland) Peter Wright (first round)
16. (England) Terry Jenkins (first round)

== Prize money ==
The total prize fund was £160,000.

Stage (no. of players)		Prize money (Total: £160,000)
Winner	(1)	£50,000
Runner-up	(1)	£20,000
Semi-finalists	(2)	£10,000
Quarter-finalists	(4)	£7,500
First round losers	(8)	£5,000

== Draw ==
First round (best of 11 legs); 1 November
1	(England) Phil Taylor 97.38	6
16	(England) Terry Jenkins 86.89	3
8	(England) Wes Newton 91.13	6
9	(England) Justin Pipe 88.26	5
5	(England) James Wade 87.87	6
12	(England) Kevin Painter 92.93	5
4	(Australia) Simon Whitlock 96.29	6
13	(England) Mervyn King 93.50	4
2	(Netherlands) Michael van Gerwen 103.47	6
15	(Scotland) Peter Wright 99.92	2
7	(England) Dave Chisnall 94.06	3
10	(Netherlands) Raymond van Barneveld 98.42	6
6	(England) Andy Hamilton 89.24	4
11	(Scotland) Robert Thornton 89.98	6
3	(England) Adrian Lewis 99.72	6
14	(Belgium) Kim Huybrechts 106.43	5

Quarter-finals (best of 15 legs); 2 November
1	(England) Phil Taylor 109.28	8
8	(England) Wes Newton 99.27	2
5	(England) James Wade 97.17	8
4	(Australia) Simon Whitlock 94.13	7
2	(Netherlands) Michael van Gerwen 94.26	6
10	(Netherlands) Raymond van Barneveld 97.08	8
11	(Scotland) Robert Thornton 98.80	2
3	(England) Adrian Lewis 107.93	8

Semi-finals (best of 19 legs); 3 November
1	(England) Phil Taylor 106.35	10
5	(England) James Wade 73.99	1
10	(Netherlands) Raymond van Barneveld 98.83	9
3	(England) Adrian Lewis 99.61	10

Final (best of 19 legs); 3 November
1	(England) Phil Taylor 108.50	10
3	(England) Adrian Lewis 100.03	1

== Statistics ==
Player	Eliminated	Played	Legs Won	Legs Lost	LWAT	100+	140+	180s	High checkout	3-dart average
(England) Phil Taylor	Winner	4	34	7	15	55	37	11	143	105.38
(England) Adrian Lewis	Runner-up	4	25	26	6	61	42	16	156	101.82
(Netherlands) Raymond van Barneveld	Semi-finals	3	23	19	6	46	37	13	143	98.11
(England) James Wade	Semi-finals	3	15	22	4	41	21	5	91	86.34
(Netherlands) Michael van Gerwen	Quarter-finals	2	12	10	5	29	12	5	135	98.87
(Australia) Simon Whitlock	Quarter-finals	2	13	12	4	28	18	8	112	95.21
(England) Wes Newton	Quarter-finals	2	8	13	4	22	17	5	65	95.20
(Scotland) Robert Thornton	Quarter-finals	2	8	12	3	30	10	5	70	94.39
(Belgium) Kim Huybrechts	First round	1	5	6	0	16	9	3	100	106.43
(Scotland) Peter Wright	First round	1	2	6	1	11	6	3	125	99.92
(England) Dave Chisnall	First round	1	3	6	1	12	5	2	84	94.06
(England) Mervyn King	First round	1	4	6	1	12	7	1	121	93.50
(England) Kevin Painter	First round	1	5	6	1	26	6	1	79	92.93
(England) Andy Hamilton	First round	1	4	6	1	7	5	5	61	89.24
(England) Justin Pipe	First round	1	5	6	3	11	11	1	88	88.26
(England) Terry Jenkins	First round	1	3	6	1	16	5	0	120	86.89

Source: Match reports from the draw.

== Broadcasting ==
The tournament was available on ITV4 in the United Kingdom. It was also shown on RTL 7 in the Netherlands, Sport1 in Germany, Fox Sports in Australia and on Sky New Zealand.
