= Royal Highland Centre =

Exhibition venue in Edinburgh, Scotland

- Royal Highland Showground
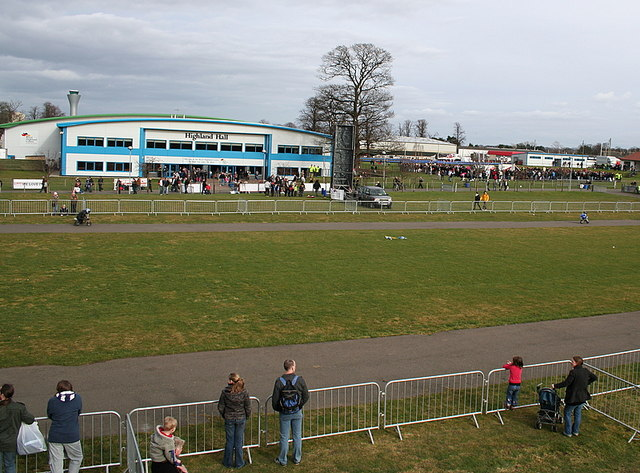
- The Highland Hall in March 2009
- Interactive map of Royal Highland Centre
- Former names: Royal Highland Showground
- Location: Ingliston, Edinburgh, Scotland
- Coordinates: 55°56′27.59″N 3°22′26.44″W
- Owner: Royal Highland and Agricultural Society of Scotland
- Capacity: Concerts: 35,000 (south arena), 27,000 (main ring), 25,000 (west arena), 15,000 (north arena), 9,000 (highland hall), 6,000 (lowland hall)

Construction
- Opened: 1960
- Renovated: 2010s
- Expanded: 1970s and 1980s

Website
- www.royalhighlandcentre.co.uk

The Royal Highland Centre (RHC), also called the Royal Highland Agricultural Exhibition Hall, originally the Royal Highland Showground or the Ingliston Showground, is an exhibition centre and showground located at Ingliston in the western outskirts of Edinburgh, Scotland, adjacent to Edinburgh Airport and the A8. The RHC now welcomes over 1 million visitors annually to a wide range of events. The largest event is the Royal Highland Show, which attracts over 200,000 visitors each year.

== History ==
The Royal Highland and Agricultural Society of Scotland (RHASS) purchased the land in 1958 for £55,000, and after 2 years of infrastructure work including a new roadway and improved electrical supplies, the 300 acres (1.2 km^{2}) site was formally opened in 1960. During the 1970s and 1980s, more facilitates were built, including the Highland Hall and Countryside Area.

In 1986, the boxing events for the 1986 Commonwealth Games were held at the Showground Pavilion (also called the Exhibition Hall) at the time. For the Games, scaffolding seats were brought in to expand the capacity to 7,000.

In 2006, the future of the Royal Highland Centre was threatened by the proposed expansion of Edinburgh Airport under a UK government white paper, which foresees the need for the Royal Highland Centre site to be used for airport use by 2013. By 2008 the plans were killed off, leaving the Royal Highland Centre where it is. This resulted in RHASS deciding to spend £75million upgrade of the site and refurbishment, with work starting just after the 2010 Royal Highland Show.

== Events ==
The Royal Highland Centre has played host to live music over the years including David Bowie, The Jacksons, Genesis, Queen, Teardrop Explodes, Rainbow, Oasis, Big Country, Boston, The Jam, Rush, Electric Light Orchestra, Iron Maiden, Anthrax, Slayer, Megadeth, Billy Idol, The Police, Duran Duran, Spandau Ballet, Barry Manilow, Boyzone, Madness, and Roxette. The Ingliston showground has also played host to a number of concerts including the Edinburgh Rock festival of 1979 featuring Van Morrison, Talking Heads, The Undertones, Squeeze, Steel Pulse and The Chieftains.

In the 1990s, the Royal Highland Centre became the home of rave events organised by North East-based Rezerection. There were monthly events in the Royal Highland Centre and each summer a much larger event called The Event staged at the centre, where 25,000 people danced the night away in numerous tents and arenas. DJs included Bass Generator, Scott Brown, Tom Wilson, Mikey B, Seduction, and DJ Rap.

In 2013 and 2014, it hosted the Professional Darts Corporation's Masters tournament. In 2017, the pop girl-band Little Mix played the first concert in the newly formed outdoor South Arena on the RHC site. As of October 2019, Monopoly Events holds the popular Comic Con Scotland annual event in the Royal Highland Centre with a large audience and many high calibre celebrity guest names attending.

In 2021, the venue was used as a vaccination centre during the COVID-19 pandemic.
