= Winmau =

British darts equipment manufacturer

Winmau Dartboard Company Ltd.
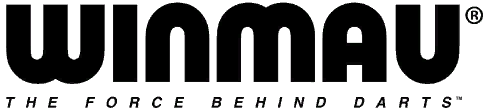
- Formerly: H.A. Kicks
- Industry: Sporting goods
- Founded: 1945; 81 years ago
- Headquarters: Bridgend, Wales, UK
- Key people: Vince Bluck, Directing Manager
- Products: Dartboards and other darts equipment
- Owner: Nodor
- Website: winmau.com

Winmau, pronounced "win more", is a Welsh manufacturer of dartboards, other darts equipment and title sponsor of the oldest darts tournament still running, the Winmau World Masters.

Founded in 1945, Winmau was acquired by rival dartboard manufacturer Nodor in 2002, headed by John Bluck, with both brands remaining in production. The company is based in Bridgend in south Wales although manufacturing of the boards takes place in Kenya.

== History ==
=== Origins ===
The company was founded as H.A. Kicks in 1945 by Harry Kicks using his demob money. The company manufactured elm dartboards that were hand-painted until the early 1950s when graphic transfers began to be used for the numbers and coloured segments. Later they produced paper-coil dartboards which, unlike elm boards, did not require soaking, and this was reflected in the brand name "Keep Dry". Scotts Dartboards of Southend, who specialised in paper-coil boards, bought the Keep Dry brand from Kicks in the late 1950s.

The company name evolved into H.A. Kicks and Sons in the early 1960s as Kicks' sons joined the business. At around the same time, the patent on bristle dartboards, owned by Nodor, expired and Kicks began to make their own bristle boards. A few years after signing a deal with the fledgling British Darts Organisation's (BDO) founder Olly Croft in 1973 which made H.A. Kicks dartboards the official boards of the organisation, Kicks changed the name of the company to Winmau. The new name came from the first three letters of Kicks' wife's first names, Winifred Maud.

=== Financial difficulties ===
Harry Kicks senior died in 1984, leaving his five sons to run the company. In the late 1980s, the popularity of darts as a televised sport began to wane, which had a knock-on effect for Winmau, which began to struggle financially. In 1969, a compulsory purchase order forced Winmau to move to new premises, and the company relocated to Haverhill in Suffolk.

=== Nodor rivalry and takeover ===
Nodor was started in 1919 by chemist Ted Leggatt as a manufacturer of modelling clay. In 1923, Leggatt produced his first dartboard which was made from clay. It did not prove popular, and within a year Nodor was making elm dart boards. By the mid-1930s, however, Nodor had found success with the launch of their patented bristle dartboard.

As soon as Nodor's patent has expired, Winmau began to produce bristle boards, and an intense rivalry between the two companies began. Each company made several bids to acquire the other, before Nodor finally completed a takeover of Winmau in 2002.

Nodor continues to manufacture darts equipment using both brand names. The Winmau brand had until recently maintained its close links with the BDO, both as title sponsor for the Winmau World Masters and the board sponsor of the BDO World Darts Championship.

== PDC partnership ==
On 31 January 2022, it was announced that the Professional Darts Corporation (PDC) would be using Winmau boards for all their tournaments in a five-year deal, beginning with the 2022 Premier League Darts.
