= Arena MK =

Multi-purpose indoor arena in Milton Keynes, England

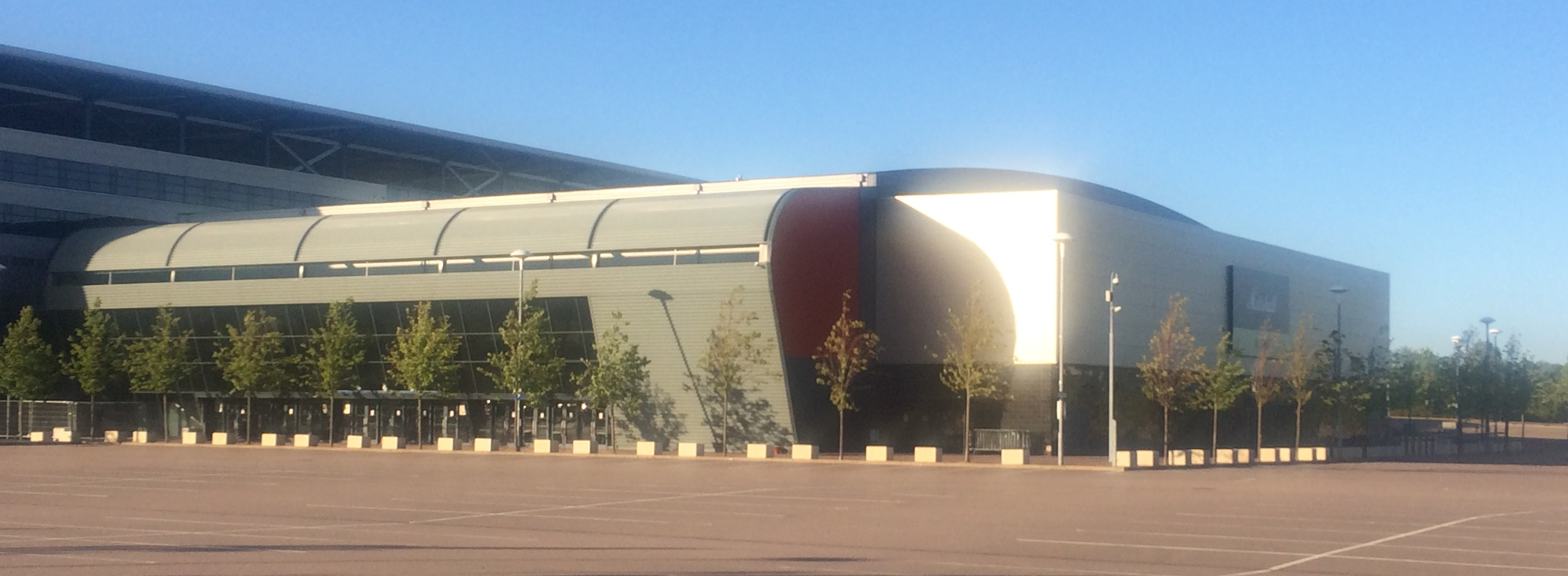
- Interactive map of the arena neighbourhood
- Former names: Marshall Arena (2018–?); Arena MK (2014–2018); Milton Keynes Arena
- Address: Stadium Way West; Milton Keynes; MK1 1ST; England
- Coordinates: 52°00′30″N 00°43′58″W
- Capacity: 5,000

Construction
- Opened: 5 February 2014
- Architect: Populous (then HOK Sport)

Website
- www.stadiummk.com/event-arena-mk

Arena MK (formerly the Marshall Arena) is a multi-purpose indoor arena in Milton Keynes, Buckinghamshire, England, located beside Stadium MK. The 3,420 square metres (36,800 sq ft) multi-use event space is positioned over three floors and anticipates music and sporting events, conferences, exhibitions and parties.

== History ==
The arena was to be the home of the Milton Keynes Lions professional basketball team. However, the retail developments that would have provided enabling funding were deferred due to lack of financing, leaving the Lions without a home. Following the conclusion of the 2011–12 season, the Lions could not secure a venue within Milton Keynes, resulting in a move south to the Copper Box.

It officially opened on 8 February 2014 when it hosted the 2014 English National Badminton Championships.

=== Name ===
In September 2018, Marshall Amplification announced an agreement with Arena MK to use the space for music events, rebranding it the "Marshall Arena". The date when that arrangement ended is not recorded.

== Regular tournaments ==
=== Darts ===
The Arena has hosted the Professional Darts Corporation's Masters tournament since 2015.

=== Snooker ===
Arena MK was chosen as the venue for the 2020 Championship League snooker tournament taking place in June 2020 because of the convenience of its on-site facilities. During the UK's coronavirus lockdown, it was important that the event was able take place behind closed doors with no need for players and officials to leave the venue for the duration of their involvement once they have arrived. For similar reasons, the Arena hosted the first 13 tournaments of the 2020–21 snooker season as well as the qualifiers for the 2021 German Masters.

As a direct result of the venue's ability to keep the snooker tour running during a pandemic, it was selected to be the venue of the 2021 English Open and also became the backup venue for the 2022 European Masters in February. The 2022 British Open would also be held at Arena MK.
