= Leg (darts) =

Single game of darts

A leg is a single game in the sport of darts. Most darts matches are played over a number of legs. Alternatively, a match may be divided into sets, with each set being contested often on a first to 3 legs or first to 5 legs basis.

== Start and finish ==
At the start of each leg, each player or team has a score of 501. A leg is over when either side reaches zero by hitting a double or the bull's eye. If playing several sets, the player throwing first is alternated.
