= Benjamin Drue Reus =

Danish darts player (born 1998)

Benjamin Reus
Personal information
- Full name: Benjamin Drue Reus
- Nickname: "The Flying Star"
- Born: 16 December 1998 (age 27) Odense, Denmark

Sport
- Sport: Darts
- Playing since: 2014
- Darts: 24g Unicorn Signature
- Laterality: Right-handed
- Walk-on music: "I'm an Albatraoz" by AronChupa

Organisation (see split in darts)
- PDC: 2022–present (Tour Card: 2024–2025)

WDF major events – best performances
- World Masters: Last 128: 2022

PDC premier events – best performances
- UK Open: Last 32: 2024

Other tournament wins
- Years
PDC Nordic & Baltic Pro Tour (×2)	2023 (×1); 2026 (×1)
Medal record
Men's Darts
Representing Denmark
WDF Europe Cup Youth
Bronze medal – third place	2016	Men's pairs

Benjamin Drue Reus (born 16 December 1998) is a Danish professional darts player who competes in Professional Darts Corporation (PDC) events. Nicknamed "the Flying Star", Reus won a PDC Tour Card in 2024, holding it until 2026.

== Career ==
Originally from Funen, Reus has played darts since 2014, and played darts at a regional level for Dartklubben Funen in Sønderborg. His status as the Danish number one darts player won him a place in the Nordic Darts Masters in 2022, but he was whitewashed in the first round 6–0 by Dimitri Van den Bergh. He qualified for it again in 2023, but was again whitewashed in the first round 6–0 by Gerwyn Price.

Reus made his World Cup of Darts debut at the 2023 edition, representing Denmark alongside Vladimir Andersen. In a surprise victory over tenth seed Austria, Drue Reus averaged 114.7, one of the highest averages in the tournament's history. In 2024, Reus secured his tour card at Q-School, becoming the second Dane to win one after Andersen in 2022. He signed to Dunvegan Enterprises management agency and with Unicorn Darts later that year.

At the 2024 UK Open, he became the first Danish player to win a match in the competition's history, defeating Bradley Roes 6–4. Wins over Tom Lonsdale, Callan Rydz and José de Sousa took him on a surprise run to the fifth round, where he was defeated by reigning world champion Luke Humphries. This was the first time a Danish player had ever reached the last 32 in a major tournament.

== Personal life ==
Outside of darts, Reus studied at UCL University College in Odense.

== Performance timeline ==
=== WDF ===
Tournament	2022
WDF events
World Masters	2R

=== PDC ===
Tournament	2022	2023	2024	2025
PDC Ranked televised events
UK Open	DNQ		5R	2R
PDC Non-ranked televised events
World Cup	DNQ	2R	RR	RR
World Youth Championship	RR	DNP		

==== Players Championships ====
Season	1	2	3	4	5	6	7	8	9	10	11	12	13	14	15	16	17	18	19	20	21	22	23	24	25	26	27	28	29	30	31	32	33	34
2024	WIG; 2R	WIG; 1R	LEI; DNP		HIL; 1R	HIL; 1R	LEI; 2R	LEI; 1R	HIL; 2R	HIL; 1R	HIL; 1R	HIL; 1R	MIL; 1R	MIL; 1R	MIL; 3R	MIL; 1R	MIL; 1R	MIL; 1R	MIL; 1R	WIG; 1R	WIG; QF	LEI; 1R	LEI; 1R	WIG; 1R	WIG; 3R	WIG; 2R	WIG; 1R	WIG; 3R	LEI; 2R	LEI; 1R				
2025	WIG; DNP		ROS; 1R	ROS; 1R	LEI; 1R	LEI; 1R	HIL; 1R	HIL; 2R	LEI; 1R	LEI; 1R	LEI; 1R	LEI; 1R	ROS; 3R	ROS; 1R	HIL; 1R	HIL; 2R	LEI; 1R	LEI; QF	LEI; 1R	LEI; 1R	LEI; 1R	HIL; 1R	HIL; 2R	MIL; 1R	MIL; 1R	HIL; 1R	HIL; 2R	LEI; 1R	LEI; 1R	LEI; 1R	WIG; 1R	WIG; 1R	WIG; 1R	WIG; 1R

==== World Series of Darts ====
Tournament	2022	2023	2024	2025
Nordic Masters	1R	1R	1R	1R

==== Nordic & Baltic Tour ====
Season	1	2	3	4	5	6	7	8	9	10	11	12
2022	SF	SF	L16	QF	L16	L16	L16	QF	L16	L32		
2023	QF	SF	L64	F	L16	SF	SF	L32	L16	W		
2024	L32	QF	QF	QF	L64	L64	Did not participate					
2025	Did not participate								L32	L64	DNP	
2026	Did not participate								W	SF	L32	SF
