= Madars Razma =

Latvian darts player (born 1988)

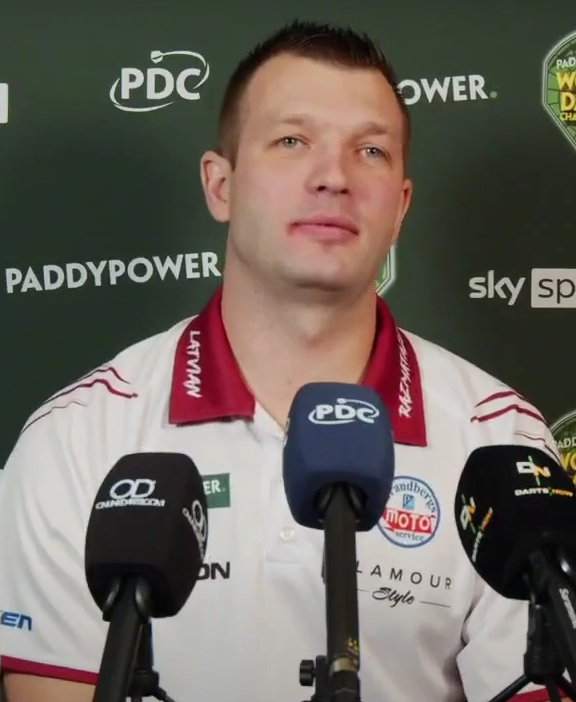
- Razma at the 2025 World Championship

Personal information
- Nickname: "Latvian Razmatazz"
- Born: 26 September 1988 (age 38) Priekule, Latvian SSR (now Latvia)
- Home town: Saldus, Latvia

Sport
- Sport: Darts
- Playing since: 1999
- Darts: 25g Mission
- Laterality: Right-handed
- Walk-on music: "Livin' on a Prayer" by Bon Jovi

Organisation (see split in darts)
- BDO: 2009–2017
- PDC: 2017–present (Tour Card: 2017–present)
- Current world ranking: (PDC) 47 ▼2 (29 October 2026)

WDF major events – best performances
- World Championship: Last 16: 2015, 2016
- World Masters: Last 16: 2015
- World Trophy: Last 32: 2014, 2015, 2016
- Finder Masters: Group Stage: 2014, 2015, 2016

PDC premier events – best performances
- World Championship: Last 32: 2024, 2025, 2026
- World Matchplay: Last 32: 2022
- World Grand Prix: Quarter-final: 2022
- UK Open: Last 32: 2019, 2021, 2025, 2026
- European Championship: Last 32: 2022, 2023
- PC Finals: Last 32: 2018, 2020
- Masters: Last 32: 2026
- World Series Finals: Last 16: 2021

Other tournament wins
- Years
Baltic Cup Open	2014
Finnish Open	2013
Latvia National Championships (×10)	2010, 2012, 2014, 2015, 2016, 2019, 2022, 2023, 2024, 2025
Latvia Open	2016
Lithuania Open	2014
Riga Open	2013
Scottish Classic	2015
Top Of Waregem	2016
PDC Nordic & Baltic Pro Tour (×10)
Scandinavian Darts Corporation	2016
PDCNB (×9)	2018 (×2), 2019 (×4), 2021 (×2), 2022

Madars Razma (born 26 September 1988) is a Latvian professional darts player who competes in Professional Darts Corporation (PDC) events. Nicknamed "Latvian Razmatazz", Razma made his first PDC major quarter-final at the 2022 World Grand Prix and has finished as the runner-up at three PDC ranking events. He is also a ten-time Latvian national champion. He is the first Latvian player to hold a PDC Tour Card and is considered the best darts player from the nation.

== Career ==
Razma originally played handball until the age of 21, before sustaining a series of injuries and turning his full attention to darts. He competed primarily in the Baltic states before he began taking part in British Darts Organisation (BDO) events.

=== BDO ===
In 2013, Razma reached the last 32 of the World Masters, losing 0–3 to Geert De Vos. He qualified for the 2014 BDO World Darts Championship, after finishing top of the Baltic and Scandinavia qualification table. He won the 2013 Riga Open and Finnish Open, reached the semi-finals of the Tallukka Open and Lithuania Open, and quarter-finals of the German Gold Cup and Polish Open, and won the 2013 Antwerp Open pairs along with Ron Meulenkamp. At the 2014 World Championship he beat John Michael to reach the last 32 stage before losing to Geert De Vos. The following year, after a consistent season, Razma upset fifth seed Martin Phillips 3–0 in the first round. He was beaten 3–4 in the second round by Brian Dawson.

At the 2016 BDO World Championship, Razma beat Gary Robson in the first round 3–1, before losing to Jamie Hughes 4–1 in the second round.

=== PDC ===
Razma entered the Professional Darts Corporation's Qualifying School in 2017. A run to the last eight on the second day saw Razma finish twelfth on the Q School Order of Merit, earning the final Tour Card on offer and making him the first Latvian to hold one.

In September 2018, Razma made his first PDC final at Players Championship 19, losing in the final to Max Hopp, 6–3. This helped qualify him for his first televised PDC event, the 2018 Players Championship Finals.

After failing to qualify for the World Championship, he managed to regain his PDC Tour Card at European Q-School in January 2019. A run to the final on the third day saw Razma finish first on the Order of Merit, earning him his card.

In 2022, Razma had a landmark year, making his debut in the World Matchplay, World Grand Prix and European Championship. He made the quarter-finals of the 2022 World Grand Prix, which was his first time reaching the last eight of a major tournament in the PDC. His successful year saw him enter the top 32 of the PDC Order of Merit for the first time.

Razma defeated Prakash Jiwa 3–1 in the first round of the 2023 World Championship, before going out in the second round in a 3–1 loss to Gary Anderson. At the 2023 European Championship, he held a 5–4 lead in his first-round match against Michael van Gerwen but missed two match darts, allowing Van Gerwen to win in a deciding leg. Razma entered the second round of the 2024 World Championship as the 32nd seed. He defeated Mike De Decker 3–1 to progress to a third-round meeting with defending champion Michael Smith, to whom he lost 4–1. Razma defeated reigning champion Dave Chisnall on his way to reaching the semi-finals of the 2024 Baltic Sea Darts Open, where he was beaten 7–4 by eventual tournament winner Rob Cross.

Razma reached the third round of the 2025 World Championship. He won his first-round match 3–1 against Christian Kist despite Kist hitting the perfect 9-dart leg to win the first set . He also lost the first set of his second-round tie against Dirk van Duijvenbode, where he claimed another 3–1 victory. He was eliminated following a 4–1 defeat to Stephen Bunting.

== Playing style ==
Razma is known for his preference for throwing for treble 19 rather than the standard treble 20.

== World Championship results ==
=== BDO ===
- 2014: First round (lost to Geert De Vos 1–3)
- 2015: Second round (lost to Brian Dawson 3–4)
- 2016: Second round (lost to Jamie Hughes 1–4)

=== PDC ===
- 2020: First round (lost to Harry Ward 2–3)
- 2021: Second round (lost to Gary Anderson 1–3)
- 2022: First round (lost to Steve Lennon 1–3)
- 2023: Second round (lost to Gary Anderson 1–3)
- 2024: Third round (lost to Michael Smith 1–4)
- 2025: Third round (lost to Stephen Bunting 1–4)
- 2026: Third round (lost to Gian van Veen 1–4)

== Performance timeline ==
=== BDO ===
Tournament	2013	2014	2015	2016
BDO Ranked televised events
World Championship	DNQ	1R	2R	2R
World Trophy	DNQ	1R	1R	1R
World Masters	L32	L32	L16	L48
Finder Masters	DNQ	RR	RR	RR

=== PDC ===
Tournament	2018	2019	2020	2021	2022	2023	2024	2025	2026
PDC Ranked televised events
World Championship	DNQ		1R	2R	1R	2R	3R	3R	3R
World Masters (Note: A non-ranked event until 2025)	Did not qualify							Prel.	1R
UK Open	DNQ	5R	3R	5R	3R	3R	3R	5R	5R
World Matchplay	DNQ				1R	DNQ			
World Grand Prix	DNQ				QF	DNQ			
European Championship	DNQ				1R	1R	DNQ		
Players Championship Finals	2R	DNQ	2R	1R	1R	DNQ	1R	2R	
PDC Non-ranked televised events
World Cup	DNP		2R	DNP	2R	2R	RR	RR	QF
World Series Finals	DNQ			2R	DNP	DNQ			
Career statistics
Year-end ranking	90	86	53	49	35	33	42	45	

==== European Tour ====
Season	1	2	3	4	5	6	7	8	9	10	11	12	13	14	
2017	Did not qualify											EDT; 1R			
2018	EDO; DNQ	GDG; 1R	GDO; DNQ	ADO; DNQ	EDG; 2R	DDM; DNQ	GDT; DNQ	DDO; 2R	Did not qualify						
2019	EDO; 1R	GDC; 1R	Did not qualify			EDG; 1R	DDM; DNQ	DDO; DNQ	CDO; 1R	Did not qualify					
2020	BDC; DNQ	GDC; DNQ	EDG; 1R	IDO; 2R											
2021	HDT; 1R	GDT; DNQ													
2022	IDO; 2R	GDC; DNQ	GDG; 3R	ADO; 3R	EDO; DNQ	CDO; DNQ	EDG; 2R	DDC; 1R	EDM; SF	HDT; 3R	GDO; DNQ	BDO; 2R	GDT; DNQ		
2023	BSD; DNQ	EDO; DNQ	IDO; 1R	GDG; DNQ	ADO; 1R	DDC; 2R	BDO; DNQ	CDO; 2R	EDG; 3R	EDM; DNQ	GDO; 2R	HDT; 1R	GDC; 1R		
2024	Did not qualify				ADO; 1R	BSD; SF	DDC; 1R	Did not qualify				SDT; 3R	CDO; 1R		
2025	Did not qualify			GDG; 3R	ADO; 1R	EDG; DNQ	DDC; DNQ	EDO; 1R	BSD; DNQ	FDT; DNQ	CDO; 2R	Did not qualify			
2026	Did not qualify				EDG; 1R	ADO; 3R	IDO; 2R	BSD; DNQ	SDO; 2R	EDO; DNQ	HDT; 1R	Did not qualify			DDC

==== Players Championships ====
Season	1	2	3	4	5	6	7	8	9	10	11	12	13	14	15	16	17	18	19	20	21	22	23	24	25	26	27	28	29	30	31	32	33	34
2017	BAR; DNP				MIL; 1R	MIL; 1R	BAR; 1R	BAR; 2R	WIG; 1R	WIG; 1R	MIL; DNP	MIL; DNP	WIG; 2R	WIG; 1R	BAR; 1R	BAR; 1R	BAR; 1R	BAR; 2R	DUB; 1R	DUB; SF	BAR; 3R	BAR; 2R												
2018	BAR; 1R	BAR; 2R	BAR; 1R	BAR; 1R	MIL; 1R	MIL; 3R	BAR; 2R	BAR; 3R	WIG; 2R	WIG; 2R	MIL; 1R	MIL; 1R	WIG; 2R	WIG; 2R	BAR; 1R	BAR; 1R	BAR; 2R	BAR; 2R	DUB; F	DUB; 1R	BAR; 1R	BAR; 3R												
2019	WIG; 1R	WIG; 1R	WIG; 2R	WIG; 1R	BAR; 2R	BAR; 2R	WIG; 2R	WIG; 3R	BAR; 1R	BAR; 2R	BAR; 2R	BAR; 1R	BAR; 2R	BAR; 1R	BAR; 1R	BAR; 2R	WIG; 1R	WIG; 4R	BAR; 1R	BAR; 1R	HIL; 2R	HIL; 2R	BAR; 3R	BAR; 1R	BAR; 1R	BAR; 2R	DUB; 1R	DUB; 3R	BAR; 2R	BAR; 2R				
2020	BAR; 1R	BAR; 1R	WIG; 1R	WIG; 3R	WIG; 1R	WIG; 2R	BAR; 3R	BAR; 2R	MIL; 2R	MIL; 4R	MIL; 1R	MIL; 2R	MIL; 4R	NIE; F	NIE; 3R	NIE; 2R	NIE; 1R	NIE; 3R	COV; 2R	COV; 1R	COV; 4R	COV; 2R	COV; 1R											
2021	BOL; 1R	BOL; 1R	BOL; 3R	BOL; QF	MIL; 2R	MIL; 2R	MIL; 1R	MIL; 1R	NIE; 1R	NIE; 3R	NIE; 3R	NIE; 2R	MIL; 1R	MIL; 1R	MIL; 1R	MIL; 3R	COV; 1R	COV; 1R	COV; 1R	COV; 1R	BAR; DNP	BAR; DNP	BAR; DNP	BAR; 1R	BAR; 3R	BAR; SF	BAR; 3R	BAR; 2R	BAR; 1R	BAR; 2R				
2022	BAR; 2R	BAR; 3R	WIG; 3R	WIG; 2R	BAR; 2R	BAR; 1R	NIE; F	NIE; 1R	BAR; 4R	BAR; 3R	BAR; 2R	BAR; 1R	BAR; 2R	WIG; 1R	WIG; 3R	NIE; 1R	NIE; 1R	BAR; 3R	BAR; 1R	BAR; 2R	BAR; 1R	BAR; 2R	BAR; 1R	BAR; QF	BAR; 1R	BAR; 1R	BAR; 3R	BAR; 2R	BAR; 1R	BAR; 3R				
2023	BAR; 2R	BAR; 3R	BAR; QF	BAR; 2R	BAR; 4R	BAR; 1R	HIL; 1R	HIL; 2R	WIG; 1R	WIG; 1R	LEI; 1R	LEI; 2R	HIL; 2R	HIL; 1R	LEI; 2R	LEI; 1R	HIL; 2R	HIL; 3R	BAR; 1R	BAR; 1R	BAR; 2R	BAR; 1R	BAR; 1R	BAR; 1R	BAR; 1R	BAR; 1R	BAR; 2R	BAR; 1R	BAR; 3R	BAR; 1R				
2024	WIG; 1R	WIG; 2R	LEI; 1R	LEI; 2R	HIL; 1R	HIL; 1R	LEI; 1R	LEI; 3R	HIL; 1R	HIL; 3R	HIL; QF	HIL; SF	MIL; 1R	MIL; 1R	MIL; 2R	MIL; 2R	MIL; 1R	MIL; 2R	MIL; 2R	WIG; 1R	WIG; 3R	MIL; QF	MIL; 4R	WIG; 2R	WIG; 2R	WIG; 1R	WIG; 4R	WIG; 1R	LEI; 1R	LEI; QF				
2025	WIG; 2R	WIG; 1R	ROS; 2R	ROS; 1R	LEI; 1R	LEI; SF	HIL; 1R	HIL; 1R	LEI; 2R	LEI; 2R	LEI; 3R	LEI; 1R	ROS; 3R	ROS; 2R	HIL; 1R	HIL; 3R	LEI; 2R	LEI; 2R	LEI; 1R	LEI; 4R	LEI; 2R	HIL; 2R	HIL; 1R	MIL; 2R	MIL; 3R	HIL; 1R	HIL; 1R	LEI; 3R	LEI; 1R	LEI; 3R	WIG; 2R	WIG; 1R	WIG; 1R	WIG; 4R
2026	HIL; 2R	HIL; 3R	WIG; 2R	WIG; 2R	LEI; 1R	LEI; 1R	LEI; 3R	LEI; 3R	WIG; 3R	WIG; 2R	MIL; 2R	MIL; 2R	HIL; 1R	HIL; 2R	LEI; 2R	LEI; 2R	LEI; 2R	LEI; 1R	MIL; 2R	MIL; 2R	WIG; 2R	WIG; 1R	LEI; 3R	LEI; QF	HIL; 1R	HIL; 1R	LEI; 1R	LEI; 1R	ROS; 1R	ROS; 1R	ROS; 1R	ROS; 1R	LEI; 1R	LEI; 2R

==== World Series ====
Tournament	2021	2022	2023	2024	2025	2026
Nordic Masters	QF	1R	1R	1R	1R	1R

==== Nordic & Baltic Tour ====
Season	1	2	3	4	5	6	7	8	9	10
2016	DNP				W	QF	L32	SF		
2020	QF	L64								
2021	SF	W	SF	QF	W					
2022	L16	W	L16	F	SF	SF	DNP	SF	L16	L32

Performance Table Legend
W	Won the tournament	F	Finalist	SF	Semifinalist	QF	Quarterfinalist	#R; RR; Prel.	Lost in # round Round-robin; Preliminary round	DQ	Disqualified
DNQ	Did not qualify	DNP	Did not participate	WD	Withdrew	NH	Tournament not held	#R; RR; Prel.	Lost in # round Round-robin; Preliminary round	NYF	Not yet founded
