= 2023 World Series of Darts Finals =

2023 Jack's World Series of Darts Finals

Tournament information
- Dates: 15–17 September 2023
- Venue: AFAS Live
- Location: Amsterdam
- Country: Netherlands
- Organisation(s): PDC
- Format: Legs
- Prize fund: £300,000
- Winner's share: £70,000
- Nine-dart finish: Michael van Gerwen
- High checkout: 170 Nathan Aspinall

Champion(s)
- Michael van Gerwen

The 2023 Jack's World Series of Darts Finals was the ninth staging of the World Series of Darts Finals tournament, organised by the Professional Darts Corporation. The tournament took place at the AFAS Live, Amsterdam, Netherlands, from 15 to 17 September 2023. It featured a field of 24 players.

Gerwyn Price was the defending champion, after beating Dirk van Duijvenbode 11–10 in the 2022 final. However, he lost 4–6 to Keegan Brown in the second round.

Michael van Gerwen won his fifth World Series Finals title, defeating Nathan Aspinall 11–4 in the final.

== Prize money ==
The prize money remained the same as the previous year.

| Position (no. of players) | | Prize money (Total: £300,000) |
|---|---|---|
| Winner | (1) | £70,000 |
| Runner-up | (1) | £30,000 |
| Semi-finalists | (2) | £20,000 |
| Quarter-finalists | (4) | £15,000 |
| Last 16 (second round) | (8) | £7,500 |
| Last 24 (first round) | (8) | £5,000 |

== Qualification ==
The top eight players from the six World Series events were seeded for this tournament.

Those events were:

- 2023 Bahrain Darts Masters
- 2023 Nordic Darts Masters
- 2023 US Darts Masters
- 2023 Poland Darts Masters
- 2023 New Zealand Darts Masters
- 2023 New South Wales Darts Masters

Eight additional players were invited by the PDC, with eight players qualifying from a qualifying event for tour card holders on September 6.

Top 8 On World Series Order of Merit
1. Rob Cross (quarter-finals)
2. Gerwyn Price (second round)
3. Michael Smith (second round)
4. Michael van Gerwen (winner)
5. Dimitri Van den Bergh (quarter-finals)
6. Peter Wright (semi-finals)
7. Nathan Aspinall (runner-up)
8. Luke Humphries (semi-finals)

Invited Players
- Damon Heta (first round)
- Danny Noppert (second round)
- Jeff Smith (first round)
- Jonny Clayton (second round)
- Raymond van Barneveld (quarter-finals)
- Simon Whitlock (first round)
- Haupai Puha (second round)
- Krzysztof Ratajski (second round)

Tour Card Holder Qualifiers
- Dirk van Duijvenbode (first round)
- Martin Schindler (first round)
- Ricky Evans (second round)
- Gabriel Clemens (first round)
- Graham Usher (first round)
- Daniel Klose (first round)
- Keegan Brown (quarter-finals)
- William O'Connor (second round)

== Draw ==
The draw was made on 11 September 2023.

First round (best of 11 legs); 15 September
Jonny Clayton 88.85 | 6
Q | Martin Schindler 88.83 | 3
Q | Daniel Klose 87.41 | 3
Krzysztof Ratajski 90.27 | 6
Q | Gabriel Clemens 91.42 | 2
Q | William O'Connor 91.46 | 6
Damon Heta 89.34 | 5
Q | Ricky Evans 90.12 | 6
Q | Keegan Brown 87.84 | 6
Simon Whitlock 83.76 | 1
Q | Dirk van Duijvenbode 103.20 | 4
Danny Noppert 105.57 | 6
Raymond van Barneveld 84.47 | 6
Jeff Smith 78.84 | 2
Q | Graham Usher 85.07 | 3
Haupai Puha 84.46 | 6

Second round (best of 11 legs); 16 September
1 | Rob Cross 92.68 | 6
Jonny Clayton 94.91 | 3
8 | Luke Humphries 106.74 | 6
Krzysztof Ratajski 98.63 | 3
4 | Michael van Gerwen 93.57 | 6
Q | William O'Connor 91.65 | 4
5 | Dimitri Van den Bergh 97.08 | 6
Q | Ricky Evans 79.37 | 1
2 | Gerwyn Price 100.50 | 4
Q | Keegan Brown 92.10 | 6
7 | Nathan Aspinall 95.51 | 6
Danny Noppert 94.68 | 3
3 | Michael Smith 92.36 | 4
Raymond van Barneveld 94.15 | 6
6 | Peter Wright 83.53 | 6
Haupai Puha 86.63 | 4

Quarter-finals (best of 19 legs); 17 September
1 | Rob Cross 93.28 | 2
8 | Luke Humphries 98.00 | 10
4 | Michael van Gerwen 103.91 | 10
5 | Dimitri Van den Bergh 99.52 | 8
Q | Keegan Brown 92.37 | 5
7 | Nathan Aspinall 97.79 | 10
Raymond van Barneveld 95.07 | 6
6 | Peter Wright 93.64 | 10

Semi-finals (best of 21 legs); 17 September
8 | Luke Humphries 96.31 | 10
4 | Michael van Gerwen 100.42 | 11
7 | Nathan Aspinall 90.35 | 11
6 | Peter Wright 90.76 | 9

Final (best of 21 legs); 17 September
4 | Michael van Gerwen 96.16 | 11
7 | Nathan Aspinall 83.57 | 4
