= Marko Kantele =

Finnish darts player

Personal information
- Born: 24 August 1968 (age 58) Mäntyharju, Finland
- Home town: Vääksy, Finland

Sport
- Sport: Darts
- Playing since: 1989
- Darts: 18g Target
- Laterality: Right-handed
- Walk-on music: "The Trooper" by Iron Maiden

Organisation (see split in darts)
- BDO: 1996–2008
- PDC: 2008–

WDF major events – best performances
- World Championship: Last 16: 2005
- World Masters: Last 16: 1997, 2004
- World Trophy: Last 32: 2004, 2005
- Int. Darts League: Last 32: 2005
- Dutch Open: Last 1024: 2025

PDC premier events – best performances
- World Championship: Last 64: 2009, 2018
- UK Open: Last 128: 2019, 2020

Other tournament wins
- Years
Irish Open	2024
SDC Tour
2014, 2015
PDC Nordic & Baltic Pro Tour (×15)
2014 (×1); 2015 (×1); 2017 (×2); 2018 (×2); 2019 (×1); 2021 (×1); 2022 (×1); 2023 (×4); 2024 (×1); 2025 (×1)
Medal record
Men's Darts
Representing Finland
WDF World Cup
Silver medal – second place	2001 Kuala Lumpur	Men's pairs
Silver medal – second place	2001 Kuala Lumpur	Men's team
Silver medal – second place	2001 Kuala Lumpur	Men's overall
Silver medal – second place	2007 Rosmalen	Men's pairs
Bronze medal – third place	1997 Perth	Men's team
WDF Europe Cup
Silver medal – second place	2006 Ennis	Men's pairs
Silver medal – second place	2008 Copenhagen	Men's pairs
Bronze medal – third place	2004 Tampere	Men's singles
Bronze medal – third place	2004 Tampere	Men's team
Bronze medal – third place	2004 Tampere	Men's overall
Bronze medal – third place	2006 Ennis	Men's overall
Bronze medal – third place	2018 Budapest	Men's team

Marko Kantele (born 24 August 1968) is a Finnish darts player who competes in Professional Darts Corporation (PDC) and World Darts Federation (WDF) events.

== Career ==
Kantele made his major debut in the 1997 Winmau World Masters, beating defending champion Colin Monk in the first round but lost in the second round to Mark Day. He returned to the Masters five years later, losing in the second round to Ted Hankey. Kantele made a third appearance at the Masters, beating Bobby George and Remco van Eijden to reach the last 16 where he lost to Martin Atkins. He also played in the 2004 World Darts Trophy, losing in the first round to Robert Wagner.

Kantele qualified for the 2005 BDO World Darts Championship, beating Tony O'Shea in the first round before losing in the second round to Simon Whitlock. He also played in the International Darts League the same year, winning his opening group game against Mario Robbe but lost to Raymond van Barneveld and Atkins, eliminating him from the group stages. He also played in the 2005 World Darts Trophy, but lost in the first round to Vincent van der Voort. Kantele reached the last 32 of the 2006 World Masters and reached the last 32, losing to Darryl Fitton. Kantele reached the quarter-finals of the 2007 WDF World Cup but failed to qualify for the World Championship.

Kantele won the PDC World Finland Qualifying Event, beating Asko Niskala in the final. The win earned him a spot in the 2009 PDC World Darts Championship and made him Finland's first ever representative. He beat Lourence Ilagan 5–2 in legs in the preliminary round, but lost 3–1 in sets to Ronnie Baxter in the first round. Afterwards, Kantele began playing in PDC Europe events competing for the European Order of Merit.

Kantele represented Finland with Petri Korte in the 2012 PDC World Cup of Darts and together they were beaten 4–5 by Croatia in the first round. His best result in the rest of 2012 was in reaching the semi-finals of a Scandinavian tour event in Finland where he lost 1–6 to Ulf Ceder. He finished 11th on the SDC Order of Merit. In January 2013 he entered the PDC's Q School to try and earn a two-year tour card but he finished joint 95th having played all four days with his best result being a last 64 defeat. In September, Kantele lost in the final of the Sawo Open to Veijo Viinikka.

In the second Swedish event on the 2014 Scandinavian Pro Tour, Kantele won the title by defeating Jarkko Komula 6–4. He also reached the final of the Nordic Cup, but lost 4–2 against Daniel Larsson. Kantele played in his first World Cup since 2012 in 2015 and first with Kim Viljanen and they were beaten 5–4 by South Africa in the opening round with Kantele missing one match dart. He won the final event on the 2015 Scandinavian Darts Corporation Pro Tour by edging past Magnus Caris 6–5.

Kantele and Viljanen lost 5–1 in the first round of the 2016 World Cup to Wales. In 2017 Viljanen missed two match darts in the first round as they were knocked out 5–4 by Wales.

By finishing second on the 2019 European Q-School Order of Merit, he earned a PDC Tour Card for 2019–2020.

== World Championship results ==
=== BDO ===
- 2005: Second round (lost to Simon Whitlock 1–3)

=== PDC ===
- 2009: First round (lost to Ronnie Baxter 1–3)
- 2018: First round (lost to John Henderson 0–3)
- 2020: First round (lost to William O'Connor 0–3)
- 2021: First round (lost to John Henderson 2–3)
- 2024: First round (lost to Radek Szagański 2–3)

=== WDF ===
- 2025: First round (lost to Dalibor Šmolík 1–3)

== Performance timeline ==
=== BDO ===
Tournament	1997	2002	2004	2005	2006	2007	2013	2014	2015	2016
BDO Ranked televised events
World Championship	Did not participate			2R	Did not participate					
World Darts Trophy	NH	DNP	1R	1R	DNP		Not held			
World Masters	L16	L32	L16	DNP	L32	L40	L144	L272	L272	L272

=== WDF ===
Tournament	2022	2024	2025
WDF Ranked major/platinum events
World Championship	DNP		1R
World Masters	RR	L128	RR

=== PDC ===
Tournament	2009	2010	2012	2015	2016	2017	2018	2019	2020	2021	2022	2023	2024	2025
PDC Ranked televised events
World Championship	1R	Did not qualify					1R	DNQ	1R	1R	DNQ		1R	DNQ
UK Open	Did not qualify							2R	2R	Did not qualify				
PDC Non-ranked televised events
World Cup	NH	1R	1R	1R	1R	1R	2R	1R	1R	1R	1R	RR	RR	RR
Career statistics
Year-end ranking	90	151	155	-	-	116	112	103	84	-	178	129	154	238

==== European Tour ====
Season	1	2	3	4	5	6	7	8	9	10	11	12	13	14
2014	Did not participate			ADO; 1R	Did not participate									
2017	DNQ		GDO; 1R	DNQ		EDM; 2R	Did not qualify							
2018	EDO; 2R	Did not qualify											EDT; 2R	
2022	IDO; DNP	GDC; 1R	Did not participate/qualify										GDT; 1R	
2023	BSD; DNQ	EDO; 1R	Did not qualify			DDC; 1R	DNQ		EDG; 1R	EDM; 2R	Did not qualify			
2024	Did not qualify							EDO; 1R	GDC; DNQ	FDT; 1R	DNQ		CDO; 1R	
2025	BDO; DNQ	EDT; 1R	Did not qualify											

==== Players Championships ====
Season	1	2	3	4	5	6	7	8	9	10	11	12	13	14	15	16	17	18	19	20	21	22	23	24	25	26	27	28	29	30
2019	WIG; 2R	WIG; 1R	WIG; 1R	WIG; 1R	BAR; 1R	BAR; 1R	WIG; 3R	WIG; 3R	BAR; 1R	BAR; 4R	BAR; 1R	BAR; 1R	BAR; 1R	BAR; 1R	BAR; 2R	BAR; 1R	WIG; 4R	WIG; 1R	BAR; 1R	BAR; 2R	HIL; 1R	HIL; 4R	BAR; 1R	BAR; 1R	BAR; 1R	BAR; 1R	DUB; 1R	DUB; 1R	BAR; 2R	BAR; 1R
2020	BAR; 1R	BAR; 1R	WIG; 2R	WIG; 2R	WIG; 1R	WIG; 2R	BAR; 1R	BAR; 1R	MIL; Did not participate					NIE; 1R	NIE; 1R	NIE; 1R	NIE; 2R	NIE; 1R	COV; 1R	COV; 1R	COV; 1R	COV; 1R	COV; 1R							

==== World Series of Darts ====
Tournament	2021	2022	2023	2024
Nordic Darts Masters	1R	1R	1R	1R

Performance Table Legend
W	Won the tournament	F	Finalist	SF	Semifinalist	QF	Quarterfinalist	#R; RR; L#	Lost in # round Round-robin; Last # stage	DQ	Disqualified
DNQ	Did not qualify	DNP	Did not participate	WD	Withdrew	NH	Tournament not held	#R; RR; L#	Lost in # round Round-robin; Last # stage	NYF	Not yet founded
