= 2026 Nordic Darts Masters =

Darts tournament

2026 Mr Vegas Nordic Darts Masters

Tournament information
- Dates: 5–6 June 2026
- Venue: Forum Copenhagen
- Location: Copenhagen, Denmark
- Organisation(s): Professional Darts Corporation (PDC)
- Format: Legs
- Prize fund: £100,000
- Winner's share: £30,000
- High checkout: 167 Gian van Veen

Champion(s)
- Michael van Gerwen (NED)

The 2026 Nordic Darts Masters (known for sponsorship reasons as the 2026 Mr Vegas Nordic Darts Masters) was a professional darts tournament that took place from 5 to 6 June 2026 at the Forum Copenhagen in Copenhagen, Denmark. It was the sixth staging of the tournament by the Professional Darts Corporation (PDC), and was the third event in the 2026 World Series of Darts. The total prize fund was £100,000, with the winner receiving £30,000.

The tournament featured 16 players, consisting of eight PDC representatives, and eight Nordic and Baltic representatives. Stephen Bunting was the defending champion, having defeated Rob Cross 8–4 in the 2025 final. However, he lost 6–5 to Viktor Tingström in the first round.

Michael van Gerwen won the tournament, his 18th World Series title, by defeating Luke Humphries 8–7 in the final. Tingström and Humphries missed match darts to defeat Van Gerwen in the quarter-finals and final, respectively.

== Overview ==
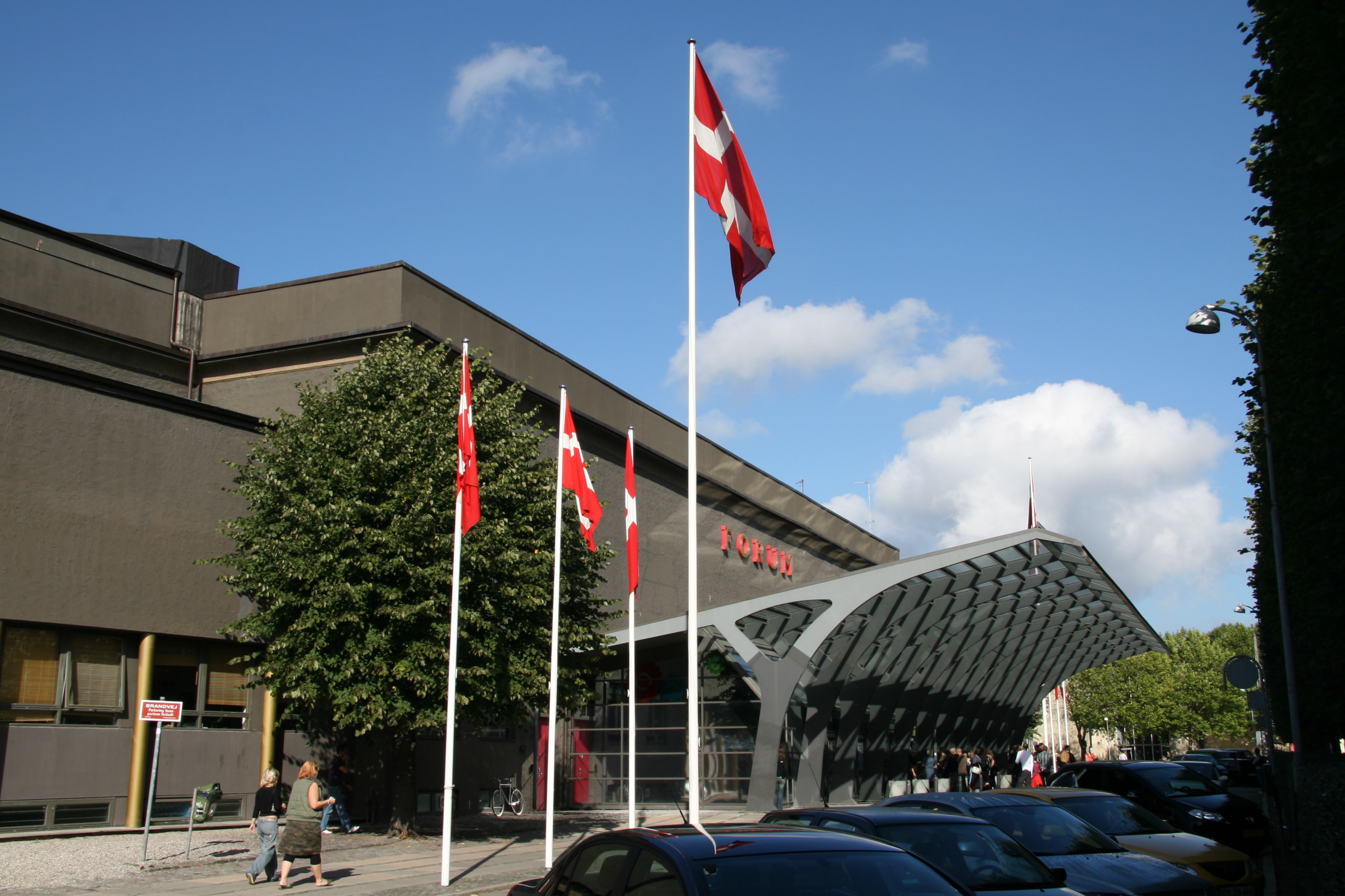
The event was held at the Forum Copenhagen (pictured in 2006) in Copenhagen, Denmark.

=== Format ===
Eight elite PDC representatives were drawn to play eight Nordic and Baltic representatives in the first round on Friday 5 June; the quarter-finals, semi-finals and final took place on Saturday 6 June.

- First round and quarter-finals: Best of eleven legs
- Semi-finals: Best of thirteen legs
- Final: Best of fifteen legs

=== Prize money ===
The total prize fund for the event remained at £100,000. The breakdown of prize money is shown below:

Position (no. of players)		Prize money (Total: £100,000)
Winner	(1)	£30,000
Runner-up	(1)	£16,000
Semi-finalists	(2)	£10,000
Quarter-finalists	(4)	£5,000
First round	(8)	£1,750

=== Broadcasts ===
The tournament was broadcast on ITV4 in the United Kingdom, Viaplay in Scandinavia, the Netherlands and Iceland, and TV3 in the Baltic states. Other broadcasters included DAZN in Germany, Austria and Switzerland; Canal+ in Poland; Fox Sports in Australia; Sky Sport in New Zealand; VTM in Belgium; FanDuel TV in the United States and Brazil; AMC Network in Hungary; Zonasport in Croatia; Arena Sport in Serbia, Bosnia and Herzegovina, Montenegro, North Macedonia and Kosovo; Setanta in Ukraine and the Commonwealth of Independent States; and Nova in the Czech Republic and Slovakia. It was also available for subscribers outside of the United Kingdom, Germany, Austria and Switzerland on the PDC's streaming service, PDCTV.

== Participants ==
The PDC announced the eight PDC representatives on 24 April.

The seedings were based on the 2026 World Series rankings after two events:

1. Michael van Gerwen (NED) (champion)
2. Luke Littler (ENG) (semi-finals)
3. Gian van Veen (NED) (quarter-finals)
4. Gerwyn Price (WAL) (quarter-finals)
5. Luke Humphries (ENG) (runner-up)
6. Stephen Bunting (ENG) (first round)
7. Jonny Clayton (WAL) (semi-finals)
8. James Wade (ENG) (quarter-finals)

The six Nordic and Baltic PDC Tour Card holders were joined by the top two players in the PDC Nordic and Baltic rankings over the previous 12 months at the cut-off point on 26 April.

Qualification	Player
PDC Tour Card holders	Madars Razma (LAT) (first round)
PDC Tour Card holders	Jeffrey de Graaf (SWE) (first round)
PDC Tour Card holders	Cor Dekker (NOR) (first round)
PDC Tour Card holders	Oskar Lukasiak (SWE) (first round)
PDC Tour Card holders	(Sweden) Viktor Tingström (SWE) (quarter-finals)
PDC Tour Card holders	Darius Labanauskas (LIT) (first round)
PDCNB rankings	Andreas Harrysson (SWE) (first round)
PDCNB rankings	Daniel Larsson (SWE) (first round)

== Summary ==
=== First round ===
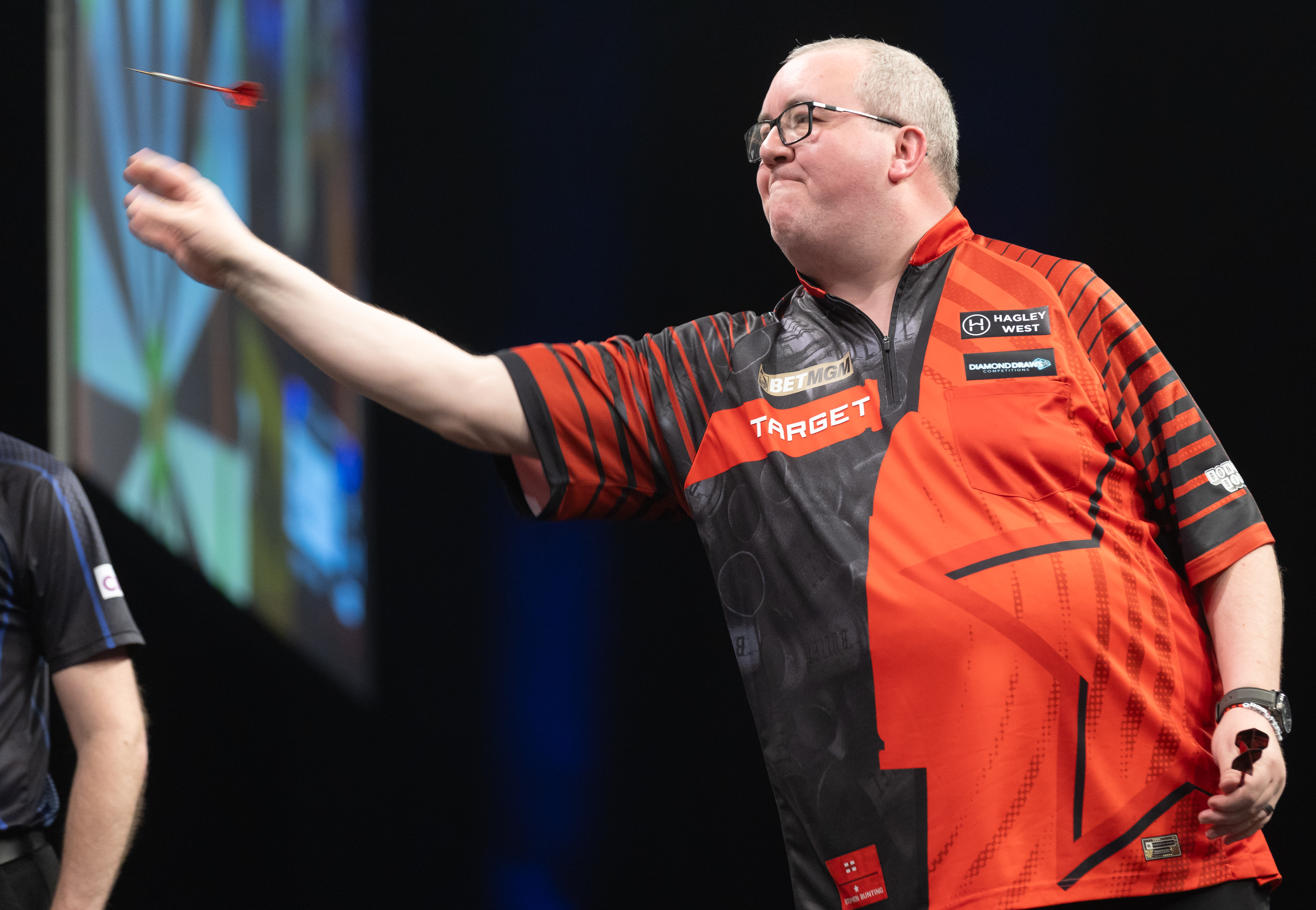
The defending champion Stephen Bunting (pictured in 2026) was eliminated by Sweden's Viktor Tingström in the first round.

The first round was played on 5 June. The defending champion Stephen Bunting was eliminated in his opening match, losing 6–5 to Sweden's Viktor Tingström after missing seven match darts. "I've had some good memories in darts, but I don't think anything can beat this at the moment," said Tingström, who became the third Nordic and Baltic representative to win a match in the event's history. "I just came here trying to enjoy it. I don't put too much pressure on myself. I don't have any pressure on me." Gerwyn Price also survived a match dart as he recorded a three-dart average of 104.03 in his 6–5 win against Darius Labanauskas, a match that featured six ton-plus checkouts. Reigning world champion Luke Littler made his first appearance since winning his second Premier League title and claimed a 6–1 victory over Cor Dekker. Gian van Veen landed a 167 checkout to complete a 6–3 win over Daniel Larsson.

Luke Humphries registered the highest three-dart average of the round, averaging 109.92 on his way to defeating Jeffrey de Graaf 6–3. Speaking after the match, Humphries stated that he had been feeling comfortable in his throw for the last four to five weeks, declaring that he can "play this level a lot more often". Jonny Clayton earned a whitewash win over Sweden's Andreas Harrysson. James Wade defeated Madars Razma 6–1 in his first World Series appearance since 2022, while Michael van Gerwen won 6‍–‍2 against Oskar Lukasiak.

=== Quarter-finals, semi-finals and final ===
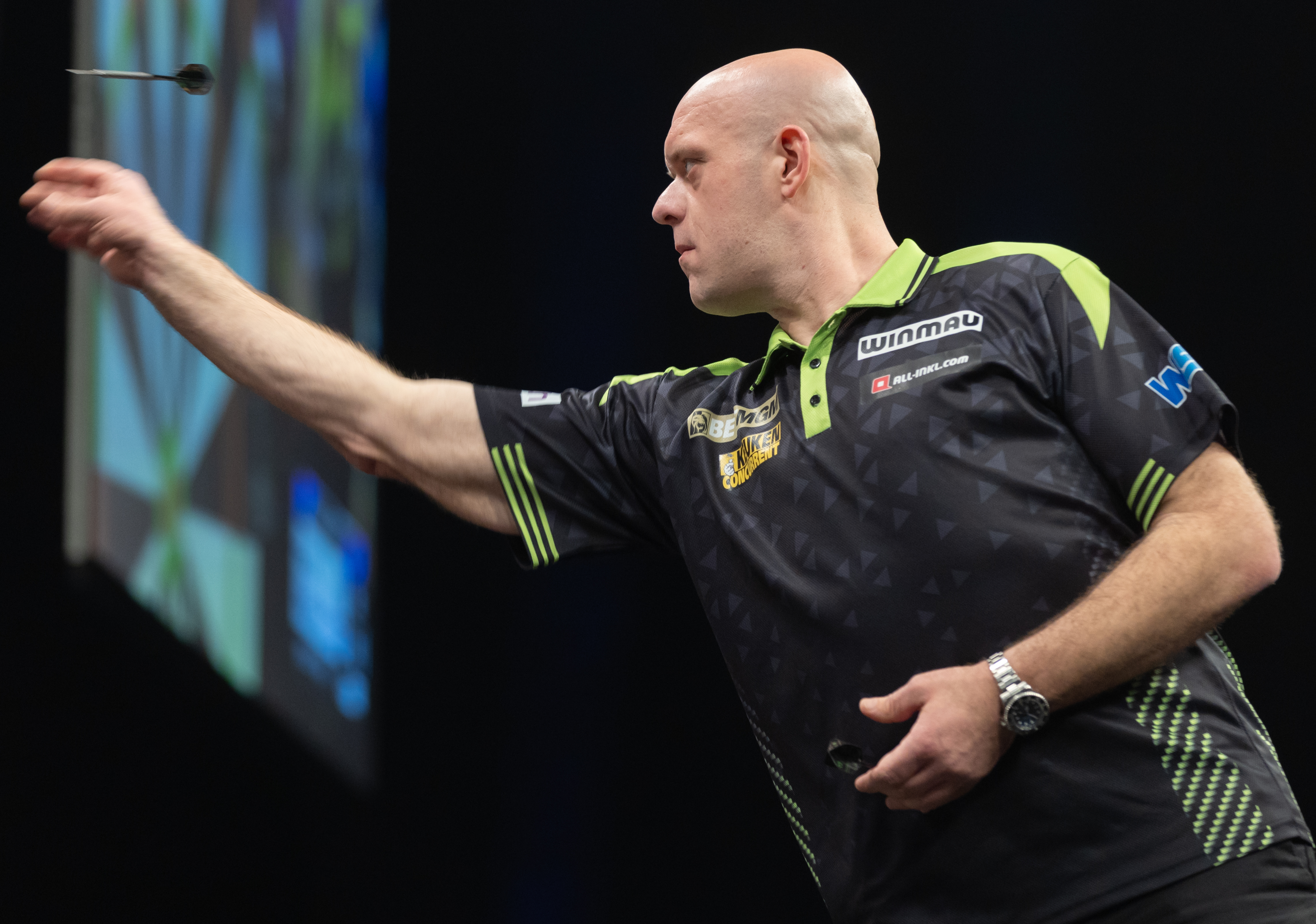
Michael van Gerwen (pictured in 2026) won his second World Series title of 2026 and his 18th overall.

The quarter-finals, semi-finals and final were played on 6 June. Viktor Tingström threatened another upset victory as he established a 5–3 lead over Michael van Gerwen in the first quarter-final. However, the Dutchman survived a match dart from Tingström and won the match in a deciding leg. Jonny Clayton earned a 6–3 win against Welsh compatriot Gerwyn Price, while Luke Littler defeated James Wade 6–1. In the last quarter-final, Luke Humphries and Gian van Veen also went to a deciding leg, where Humphries prevailed 6–5. Van Gerwen averaged 101.55 in a 7–4 victory over Clayton in the first semi-final. In the second semi-final, Littler and Humphries faced off in a rematch of the Premier League final nine days earlier. The pair were level at 4–4 when Humphries found a break of throw with a 132 checkout, hitting two bullseyes and double 16 to take the lead. Humphries ultimately claimed a 7–5 win to set up a final with Van Gerwen, finishing the match with an average of 105.82. Top seed and world number four Van Gerwen was aiming to win his second World Series title of 2026 in his third consecutive final, while world number two Humphries was looking to win his third World Series title overall.

Humphries began the final by taking a 3–1 lead, but Van Gerwen claimed the next four legs to go 5–3 in front. Humphries restored parity, winning successive legs to level at 5–5. The pair traded breaks of throw before taking the match to a last-leg decider, where Humphries missed the bullseye for a 127 checkout to win the title, allowing Van Gerwen to convert a 72 finish on double 20 to triumph 8–7. Van Gerwen recorded a three-dart average of 98.90 and hit 57 per cent of his attempts at double, while Humphries averaged 98.83.

Van Gerwen won his 18th World Series title and his second of 2026, having claimed his first at the Bahrain Darts Masters in January. He also became the first two-time winner of the Nordic Darts Masters. The three-time world champion called the final a "really tough game" and claimed that Humphries let him get away with it when he missed an opportunity to go 4–1 ahead. On winning the title, he said: "It is always nice to have a win behind your name again. That gives confidence and a good feeling because my performances early on in the rounds were not good." Speaking in defeat, Humphries expressed disappointment in the Copenhagen crowd who could be heard booing and whistling throughout the match, stating: "I'm up here to win titles. I just want to give everyone entertainment. You feel disappointed and it's hard work in the end." He later discussed the upcoming World Cup of Darts: "Hopefully in the World Cup I can gain some silverware and win a tournament—it would be nice for me, that's what I need."

== Draw ==
The draw was announced on 1 June. Numbers to the left of players' names show the seedings for the top four in the tournament. The figures to the right of a player's name state their three-dart average in a match. Players in bold denote match winners.

**First round** (best of 11 legs); 5 June
**1**	**Michael van Gerwen 88.76**	**6**
Oskar Lukasiak 79.68	2
Stephen Bunting 87.25	5
**Viktor Tingström 83.47**	**6**
**4**	**Gerwyn Price 104.03**	**6**
Darius Labanauskas 97.49	5
**Jonny Clayton 104.86**	**6**
Andreas Harrysson 82.25	0
**2**	**Luke Littler 93.40**	**6**
Cor Dekker 80.14	1
**James Wade 87.00**	**6**
Madars Razma 83.70	1
**3**	**Gian van Veen 95.83**	**6**
Daniel Larsson 82.60	3
**Luke Humphries 109.92**	**6**
Jeffrey de Graaf 95.84	3

**Quarter-finals** (best of 11 legs); 6 June
**1**	**Michael van Gerwen 86.12**	**6**
Viktor Tingström 84.34	5
4	Gerwyn Price 96.46	3
**Jonny Clayton 91.61**	**6**
**2**	**Luke Littler 99.27**	**6**
James Wade 90.85	1
3	Gian van Veen 96.71	5
**Luke Humphries 96.39**	**6**

**Semi-finals** (best of 13 legs); 6 June
**1**	**Michael van Gerwen 101.55**	**7**
Jonny Clayton 95.73	4
2	Luke Littler 100.85	5
**Luke Humphries 105.42**	**7**

**Final** (best of 15 legs); 6 June
**1**	**Michael van Gerwen 98.90**	**8**
Luke Humphries 98.83	7
