= 2024 Baltic Sea Darts Open =

2024 NEO.bet Baltic Sea Darts Open

Tournament information
- Dates: 10–12 May 2024
- Venue: Wunderino Arena
- Location: Kiel, Germany
- Organisation(s): Professional Darts Corporation (PDC)
- Format: Legs
- Prize fund: £175,000
- Winner's share: £30,000
- Nine-dart finish: Luke Humphries
- High checkout: 170; Ryan Joyce; Mike De Decker; Madars Razma

Champion(s)
- Rob Cross

The 2024 Baltic Sea Darts Open known as the 2024 NEO.bet Baltic Sea Darts Open for sponshorship reasons, was the sixth of thirteen PDC European Tour events on the 2024 PDC Pro Tour. The tournament took place at the Wunderino Arena, Kiel, Germany from 10 to 12 May 2024. It featured a field of 48 players and £175,000 in prize money, with £30,000 going to the winner.

Dave Chisnall was the defending champion after defeating Luke Humphries 8–5 in the 2023 final. Chisnall lost 6–5 to Madars Razma in the second round.

Rob Cross won his second European Tour title, beating Luke Humphries 8–6 in the final.

In the final, Humphries hit his second nine-darter on the European Tour. It came in the eighth leg.

== Prize money ==
The prize fund remained at £175,000, with £30,000 to the winner:

Stage (num. of players)		Prize money
Winner	(1)	£30,000
Runner-up	(1)	£12,000
Semi-finalists	(2)	£8,500
Quarter-finalists	(4)	£6,000
Third round losers	(8)	£4,000
Second round losers	(16)	£2,500*
First round losers	(16)	£1,250*
Total	£175,000	

- Pre-qualified players from the Orders of Merit who lose in their first match of the event shall not be credited with prize money on any Order of Merit. A player who qualifies as a qualifier, but later becomes a seed due to the withdrawal of one or more other players shall be credited with their prize money on all Orders of Merit regardless of how far they progress in the event.

== Qualification and format ==
A massive overhaul in the qualification for the 2024 European Tour events was announced on 7 January.

For the first time, both the PDC Order of Merit and the PDC Pro Tour Order of Merit rankings were used to determine 32 of the 48 entrants for the event.

The top 16 on the PDC Order of Merit qualified, along with the highest 16 ranked players on the PDC ProTour Order of Merit (after the PDC Order of Merit players were removed). From those 32 players, the 16 highest ranked players on the PDC ProTour Order of Merit were seeded for the event.

The seedings were confirmed on 4 April.

The remaining 16 places went to players from four qualifying events – 10 from the Tour Card Holder Qualifier (held on 10 April), four from the Host Nation Qualifier (held on 18 February), one from the Nordic & Baltic Associate Nation Qualifier (held on the 5 April) and one from the East European Associate Member Qualifier (held on the 6 April).

Gerwyn Price and Gary Anderson withdrew and were replaced by Luke Woodhouse and Jermaine Wattimena. Krzysztof Ratajski and Joe Cullen moved up to become the 15th and 16th seeds respectively.

The following players took part in the tournament:

Seeded Players

1. Dave Chisnall (second round)
2. Damon Heta (third round)
3. Luke Humphries (runner-up)
4. Rob Cross (champion)
5. Jonny Clayton (second round)
6. Michael van Gerwen (quarter-finals)
7. Josh Rock (second round)
8. Dirk van Duijvenbode (second round)
9. Ryan Searle (quarter-finals)
10. Danny Noppert (semi-finals)
11. Peter Wright (second round)
12. Ricardo Pietreczko (third round)
13. Stephen Bunting (third round)
14. Ross Smith (third round)
15. Krzysztof Ratajski (second round)
16. Joe Cullen (third round)

Order of Merit Qualifiers
- Nathan Aspinall (first round)
- Dimitri Van den Bergh (first round)
- Chris Dobey (first round)
- Daryl Gurney (third round)
- Andrew Gilding (third round)
- Raymond van Barneveld (second round)
- Gian van Veen (second round)
- Martin Schindler (first round)
- Ryan Joyce (first round)
- José de Sousa (first round)
- James Wade (second round)
- Brendan Dolan (first round)
- Luke Littler (first round)
- Gabriel Clemens (first round)

Tour Card Qualifier
- Matthew Dennant (first round)
- Mike De Decker (quarter-finals)
- Madars Razma (semi-finals)
- Wessel Nijman (second round)
- Ritchie Edhouse (quarter-finals)
- Maik Kuivenhoven (second round)
- Niels Zonneveld (first round)
- Thibault Tricole (first round)
- Andy Baetens (second round)
- Haupai Puha (first round)

Host Nation Qualifier
- Moritz Hilger (second round)
- Franz Rötzsch (third round)
- Kevin Troppmann (first round)
- Christopher Toonders (first round)

Nordic & Baltic Qualifier
- Daniel Larsson (first round)

East European Qualifier
- Sebastian Białecki (second round)

Reserve List
- Luke Woodhouse (second round)
- Jermaine Wattimena (second round)

== Draw ==
First round (best of 11 legs); 10 May
Madars Razma 86.49	6
Chris Dobey 91.04	5
James Wade 99.92	6
Niels Zonneveld 93.54	2
Daryl Gurney 88.30	6
Dimitri Van den Bergh 87.77	3
Brendan Dolan 86.41	1
Alt	Jermaine Wattimena 101.06	6
Maik Kuivenhoven 92.02	6
Christopher Toonders 82.75	0
Andy Baetens 95.33	6
Gabriel Clemens 94.06	5
Ritchie Edhouse 106.46	6
Nathan Aspinall 99.31	2
Moritz Hilger 79.51	6
Matthew Dennant 79.46	2
Kevin Troppmann 94.99	4
Gian van Veen 95.10	6
Martin Schindler 95.09	3
Mike De Decker 96.44	6
Haupai Puha 82.04	4
Franz Rötzsch 85.93	6
Raymond van Barneveld 99.33	6
Daniel Larsson 95.18	1
Sebastian Białecki 88.06	6
José de Sousa 84.92	5
Alt	Luke Woodhouse 97.16	6
Ryan Joyce 96.66	5
Luke Littler 83.98	3
Wessel Nijman 92.44	6
Thibault Tricole 82.92	1
Andrew Gilding 84.24	6

Second round (best of 11 legs); 11 May
1	Dave Chisnall 97.50	5
Madars Razma 96.61	6
16	Joe Cullen 96.83	6
James Wade 91.93	3
8	Dirk van Duijvenbode 92.98	3
Daryl Gurney 91.42	6
9	Ryan Searle 96.92	6
Alt	Jermaine Wattimena 99.19	5
4	Rob Cross 102.59	6
Maik Kuivenhoven 94.45	2
13	Stephen Bunting 94.49	6
Andy Baetens 93.69	3
5	Jonny Clayton 96.36	5
Ritchie Edhouse 93.13	6
12	Ricardo Pietreczko 89.29	6
Moritz Hilger 76.55	0
2	Damon Heta 104.54	6
Gian van Veen 100.01	4
15	Krzysztof Ratajski 92.30	5
Mike De Decker 93.32	6
7	Josh Rock 91.84	3
Franz Rötzsch 91.36	6
10	Danny Noppert 100.34	6
Raymond van Barneveld 100.05	5
3	Luke Humphries 103.65	6
Sebastian Białecki 89.11	1
14	Ross Smith 99.60	6
Alt	Luke Woodhouse 97.62	4
6	Michael van Gerwen 107.78	6
Wessel Nijman 92.83	2
11	Peter Wright 85.50	2
Andrew Gilding 94.37	6

Third round (best of 11 legs); 12 May
Razma 93.32	6
16	Cullen 88.57	5
Gurney 94.10	5
9	Searle 96.88	6
4	Cross 103.21	6
13	Bunting 100.91	5
Edhouse 94.92	6
12	Pietreczko 99.26	3
2	Heta 88.37	2
De Decker 97.70	6
Rötzsch 89.38	2
10	Noppert 96.64	6
3	Humphries 99.83	6
14	R.Smith 99.13	4
6	van Gerwen 89.45	6
Gilding 93.27	5

Quarter-finals (best of 11 legs); 12 May
Razma 95.30	6
9	Searle 88.86	3
4	Cross 97.61	6
Edhouse 90.98	5
De Decker 91.38	4
10	Noppert 96.75	6
3	Humphries 101.34	6
6	van Gerwen 92.30	3

Semi-finals (best of 13 legs); 12 May
Razma 92.45	4
4	Cross 99.00	7
10	Noppert 89.51	4
3	Humphries 92.93	7

Final (best of 15 legs); 12 May
4	Cross 105.56	8
3	Humphries 104.38	6
