= 2023 European Darts Grand Prix =

Darts tournament

2023 Interwetten European Darts Grand Prix

Tournament information
- Dates: 26-28 May 2023
- Venue: Glaspalast
- Location: Sindelfingen, Germany
- Organisation(s): Professional Darts Corporation (PDC)
- Format: Legs
- Prize fund: £175,000
- Winner's share: £30,000
- High checkout: 170 Gian van Veen

Champion(s)
- Rob Cross

The 2023 European Darts Grand Prix (known for sponsorship reasons as the 2023 Interwetten European Darts Grand Prix) was a professional darts tournament that took place at Glaspalast in Sindelfingen, Germany from 26 to 28 May 2023. It was the ninth of thirteen European Tour events on the 2023 PDC Pro Tour. It featured a field of 48 players and £175,000 in prize money, with £30,000 going to the winner.

Luke Humphries was the defending champion, defeating Rob Cross 8–7 in the 2022 final.

In a rematch of the previous year's final, Cross defeated Humphries 8–6, winning his first European Tour title. The result secured Cross' spot on the England team for the 2023 PDC World Cup of Darts, a spot that Humphries himself would have taken should he have won the final.

== Prize money ==
The prize money was increased for the first time in 4 years for all European Tours:

Stage (num. of players)		Prize money
Winner	(1)	£30,000
Runner-up	(1)	£12,000
Semi-finalists	(2)	£8,500
Quarter-finalists	(4)	£6,000
Third round losers	(8)	£4,000
Second round losers	(16)	£2,500*
First round losers	(16)	£1,250
Total	£175,000	

- Seeded players who lost in the second round of the event were not credited with prize money on any Order of Merit. A player who qualified as a qualifier, but later became a seed due to the withdrawal of one or more other players was credited with their prize money on all Orders of Merit regardless of how far they progressed in the event.

== Qualification and format ==
The top 16 entrants from the PDC Pro Tour Order of Merit on 12 April automatically qualified for the event and were seeded in the second round.

The remaining 32 places went to players from six qualifying events – 24 from the Tour Card Holder Qualifier (held on 17 April), two from the Associate Member Qualifier, the two highest ranked Germans automatically qualified, alongside two from the Host Nation Qualifier, one from the Nordic & Baltic Associate Member Qualifier, and one from the East European Associate Member Qualifier.

On 25 May, it was announced that Ryan Joyce and Callan Rydz had withdrawn, so Krzysztof Ratajski and Chris Dobey were called up as Reserve List Qualifiers.

The following players took part in the tournament:

Top 16

1. Luke Humphries (runner-up)
2. Dirk van Duijvenbode (second round)
3. Dave Chisnall (third round)
4. Damon Heta (semi-finals)
5. Gerwyn Price (third round)
6. Rob Cross (champion)
7. Nathan Aspinall (quarter-finals)
8. Danny Noppert (second round)
9. Josh Rock (third round)
10. Ryan Searle (second round)
11. Jonny Clayton (second round)
12. Martin Schindler (quarter-finals)
13. Joe Cullen (third round)
14. Dimitri Van den Bergh (second round)
15. Ross Smith (semi-finals)
16. Andrew Gilding (second round)

Tour Card Qualifier
- Steve Beaton (second round)
- José de Sousa (second round)
- Simon Whitlock (first round)
- Keegan Brown (second round)
- Raymond van Barneveld (third round)
- Gian van Veen (quarter-finals)
- Lee Evans (first round)
- Dylan Slevin (first round)
- Ritchie Edhouse (first round)
- Pascal Rupprecht (second round)
- Graham Hall (first round)
- Graham Usher (first round)
- Adam Smith-Neale (second round)
- Jermaine Wattimena (first round)
- Martijn Kleermaker (second round)
- Josh Payne (second round)
- Ross Montgomery (third round)
- Ricky Evans (second round)
- Daryl Gurney (third round)
- Ian White (first round)
- Madars Razma (third round)
- Alan Soutar (first round)

Associate Member Qualifier
- Marcel Walpen (first round)
- Christian Kist (first round)

Highest Ranking Germans
- Gabriel Clemens (second round)
- Ricardo Pietreczko (first round)

Host Nation Qualifier
- Liam Maendl-Lawrance (first round)
- Nico Kurz (first round)

Nordic & Baltic Qualifier
- Marko Kantele (first round)

East European Qualifier
- Roman Benecký (first round)

Reserve List Qualifiers
- Krzysztof Ratajski (quarter-finals)
- Chris Dobey (second round)

== Draw ==
The draw was confirmed on 11 May.

First round (best of 11 legs); 21 April
Graham Hall 84.70	4
Alt	Chris Dobey 84.29	6
Liam Maendl-Lawrance 93.46	3
Raymond van Barneveld 98.11	6
Gian van Veen 97.24	6
Jermaine Wattimena 101.90	5
Keegan Brown 81.04	6
Marcel Walpen 78.12	3
Roman Benecký 88.80	5
Adam Smith-Neale 87.03	6
Josh Payne 84.62	6
Simon Whitlock 91.85	3
Ian White 87.28	3
Ricky Evans 99.25	6
Gabriel Clemens 84.93	6
Lee Evans 88.67	4
Dylan Slevin 90.18	3
Daryl Gurney 94.82	6
Steve Beaton 92.44	6
Ricardo Pietreczko 93.72	5
José de Sousa 87.07	6
Nico Kurz 83.05	5
Madars Razma 87.69	6
Ritchie Edhouse 91.27	5
Pascal Rupprecht 92.11	6
Christian Kist 86.56	5
Graham Usher 94.50	3
Alt	Krzysztof Ratajski 107.37	6
Martijn Kleermaker 98.54	6
Alan Soutar 83.98	4
Ross Montgomery 91.18	6
Marko Kantele 89.18	4

Second round (best of 11 legs); 22 April
1	Luke Humphries 97.80	6
Alt	Chris Dobey 88.81	5
16	Andrew Gilding 80.57	0
Raymond van Barneveld 94.93	6
8	Danny Noppert 93.13	4
Gian van Veen 98.51	6
9	Josh Rock 90.18	6
Keegan Brown 71.09	0
4	Damon Heta 91.09	6
Adam Smith-Neale 91.86	3
13	Joe Cullen 93.25	6
Josh Payne 92.11	5
5	Gerwyn Price 96.53	6
Ricky Evans 87.86	2
12	Martin Schindler 87.47	6
Gabriel Clemens 88.82	3
2	Dirk van Duijvenbode 90.76	2
Daryl Gurney 88.88	6
15	Ross Smith 100.20	6
Steve Beaton 84.90	0
7	Nathan Aspinall 101.29	6
José de Sousa 95.71	3
10	Ryan Searle 79.69	1
Madars Razma 94.97	6
3	Dave Chisnall 99.10	6
Pascal Rupprecht 86.79	2
14	Dimitri Van den Bergh 103.27	5
Alt	Krzysztof Ratajski 96.96	6
6	Rob Cross 97.35	6
Martijn Kleermaker 84.00	2
11	Jonny Clayton 91.72	4
Ross Montgomery 87.56	6

Third round (best of 11 legs); 23 April
1	Humphries 95.28	6
van Barneveld 92.26	2
van Veen 99.86	6
9	Rock 89.20	3
4	Heta 89.89	6
13	Cullen 89.08	5
5	Price 95.21	5
12	Schindler 93.84	6
Gurney 91.97	4
15	Smith 88.84	6
7	Aspinall 98.98	6
Razma 90.99	4
3	Chisnall 91.26	1
Alt	Ratajski 99.59	6
6	Cross 93.06	6
Montgomery 80.35	3

Quarter-finals (best of 11 legs); 23 April
1	Humphries 109.94	6
van Veen 106.07	4
4	Heta 98.72	6
12	Schindler 103.98	5
15	Smith 99.59	6
7	Aspinall 100.25	5
Alt	Ratajski 90.46	4
6	Cross 90.50	6

Semi-finals (best of 13 legs); 23 April
1	Humphries 98.07	7
4	Heta 94.06	5
15	Smith 93.93	4
6	Cross 101.10	7

Final (best of 15 legs); 23 April
1	Humphries 104.22	6
6	Cross 97.73	8
