= 2025 Nordic Darts Masters =

2025 Mr Vegas Nordic Darts Masters

Tournament information
- Dates: 6–7 June 2025
- Venue: Forum Copenhagen
- Location: Copenhagen
- Country: Denmark
- Organisation(s): PDC
- Format: Legs
- Prize fund: £100,000
- Winner's share: £30,000
- High checkout: 170 Jonny Clayton

Champion(s)
- Stephen Bunting

The 2025 Nordic Darts Masters, known as the 2025 Mr Vegas Nordic Darts Masters for sponsorship reasons, was the fifth staging of the professional darts tournament by the Professional Darts Corporation, and the third entry in the 2025 World Series of Darts. The tournament featured 16 players (eight elite PDC players and eight regional qualifiers) and was held at the Forum Copenhagen in Copenhagen, Denmark on 6–7 June 2025. The total prize fund was £100,000, with the winner receiving £30,000.

Gerwyn Price was the defending champion after defeating Rob Cross 8–5 in the 2024 final. However, he lost 7–4 to Cross in the semi-finals.

Stephen Bunting won the tournament and his second World Series event of 2025 by defeating Cross 8–4 in the final.

== Overview ==
=== Format ===
Eight elite PDC representatives were drawn to play eight Nordic and Baltic representatives in the first round on Friday 6 June; the quarter-finals, semi-finals and final all took place on Saturday 7 June. All matches were in leg play format, with the number of legs required to win increasing as the tournament progressed:

- First round and quarter-finals: Best of eleven legs
- Semi-finals: Best of thirteen legs
- Final: Best of fifteen legs

=== Prize money ===
The winner received £30,000. The total prize fund was £100,000.

Position (no. of players)		Prize money (Total: £100,000)
Winner	(1)	£30,000
Runner-up	(1)	£16,000
Semi-finalists	(2)	£10,000
Quarter-finalists	(4)	£5,000
First round	(8)	£1,750

=== Broadcasts ===
The tournament was broadcast on ITV4 in the United Kingdom. Other broadcasters included DAZN in Germany, Austria and Switzerland; Viaplay in the Netherlands, Iceland, the Baltic states and Scandinavia; TV Nova in the Czech Republic and Slovakia; Fox Sports in Australia; Sky Sport in New Zealand; VTM in Belgium; AMC in Hungary and FanDuel in the United States. It was also available on PDCTV to international subscribers.

== Qualifiers ==
The PDC announced the eight players participating as their elite representatives at the event on 15 April. When the draw was announced, it was revealed that Michael van Gerwen withdrew from the event due to family reasons and was replaced by Chris Dobey.

The seedings were based on the 2025 World Series rankings after two events:

1. Stephen Bunting (champion)
2. Rob Cross (runner-up)
3. Gerwyn Price (semi-finals)
4. Luke Littler (quarter-finals)
5. Luke Humphries (quarter-finals)
6. Nathan Aspinall (semi-finals)
7. Chris Dobey (quarter-finals)
8. Jonny Clayton (quarter-finals)

The six Nordic & Baltic Tour Card holders were joined by the top two ranked players on the PDC Nordic & Baltic Tour Order of Merit at the cut-off point on 11 May.

Qualification	Player
PDC Tour Card Holders	Madars Razma (first round)
PDC Tour Card Holders	Benjamin Drue Reus (first round)
PDC Tour Card Holders	Jeffrey de Graaf (first round)
PDC Tour Card Holders	Cor Dekker (first round)
PDC Tour Card Holders	Oskar Lukasiak (first round)
PDC Tour Card Holders	Viktor Tingström (first round)
Top 2 On PDCNB Order of Merit	Andreas Harrysson (first round)
Top 2 On PDCNB Order of Merit	Darius Labanauskas (first round)

== Summary ==
=== First round ===
All eight elite PDC representatives were victorious in the first round. Luke Humphries – who had just won the 2025 Premier League – and Jonny Clayton were taken to last-leg deciders by Madars Razma and Darius Labanauskas respectively but both won 6–5; Labanauskas missed two match darts in the process. Clayton also produced a 170 checkout. Luke Littler, who was made pre-tournament favourite by tournament sponsor Mr Vegas, overcame a slow start to defeat Viktor Tingström 6–3 and set up a match with Nathan Aspinall in the quarter-finals. Aspinall whitewashed Denmark's Benjamin Reus 6–0, while Gerwyn Price began his title defence with a 6–3 win over Cor Dekker. Chris Dobey, Rob Cross and Stephen Bunting also progressed.

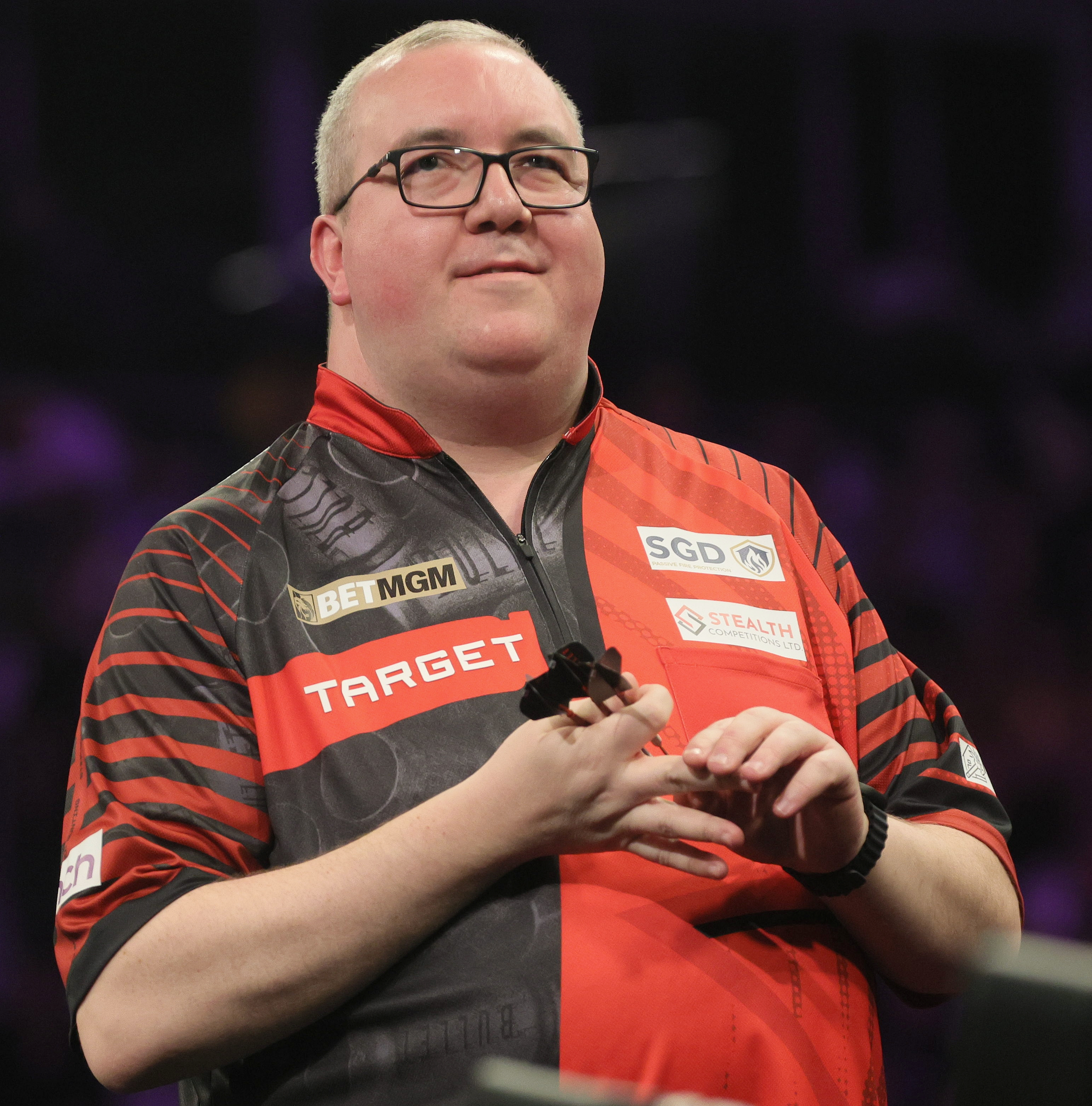
Stephen Bunting won his second World Series of Darts title of 2025.

=== Quarter-finals, semi-finals and final ===
Gerwyn Price produced a three-dart average of 108 – a tournament record – to eliminate Luke Humphries in the quarter-finals. Luke Littler was also beaten at the same stage, losing 6–3 to Nathan Aspinall who registered his second win in 16 matches against Littler. Rob Cross whitewashed Chris Dobey 6–0 and Stephen Bunting beat Jonny Clayton 6–3. In the semi-finals, Stephen Bunting stopped a late surge from Nathan Aspinall to win 7–5 and Rob Cross defeated Gerwyn Price 7–4, setting up a rematch of the previous World Series final at the Dutch Darts Masters that Cross won 8–5.

In the final, Cross led 3–2 before Bunting won five consecutive legs to make the score 7–3 in his favour, including a 104 checkout. Bunting almost won the match with a 170 checkout but missed the bullseye; however, he then checked out 25 to secure the 8–4 victory. This was Bunting's second World Series title of the year after winning the Bahrain Darts Masters in January, while Cross finished as Nordic Masters runner-up for the second year running. Bunting told ITV4 in his post-match interview that he was unsure if he was going to win another title after poor performances in recent months. He added: "But, when you win titles like this against the calibre of players that I'm playing week-in week-out, it means an awful lot."

== Draw ==
The draw was announced on 2 June. Numbers to the left of players' names show the seedings for the top four in the tournament. The figures to the right of a player's name state their three-dart average in a match. Players in bold denote match winners.

**First round** (best of 11 legs); 6 June
**1**	**Stephen Bunting 91.76**	**6**
Oskar Lukasiak 82.10	3
**Jonny Clayton 97.36**	**6**
Darius Labanauskas 87.53	5
**4**	**Luke Littler 90.19**	**6**
Viktor Tingström 80.32	3
**Nathan Aspinall 90.18**	**6**
Benjamin Drue Reus 82.94	0
**2**	**Rob Cross 93.91**	**6**
Andreas Harrysson 88.22	4
**Chris Dobey 90.25**	**6**
Jeffrey de Graaf 82.94	2
**3**	**Gerwyn Price 100.43**	**6**
Cor Dekker 87.70	3
**Luke Humphries 97.50**	**6**
Madars Razma 93.61	5

**Quarter-finals** (best of 11 legs); 7 June
**1**	**Stephen Bunting 97.48**	**6**
Jonny Clayton 91.30	3
4	Luke Littler 100.33	3
**Nathan Aspinall 99.58**	**6**
**2**	**Rob Cross 93.94**	**6**
Chris Dobey 88.33	0
**3**	**Gerwyn Price 108.26**	**6**
Luke Humphries 98.21	3

**Semi-finals** (best of 13 legs); 7 June
**1**	**Stephen Bunting 95.73**	**7**
Nathan Aspinall 91.33	5
**2**	**Rob Cross 99.47**	**7**
3	Gerwyn Price 97.62	4

**Final** (best of 15 legs); 7 June
**1**	**Stephen Bunting 97.49**	**8**
2	Rob Cross 98.04	4
