= 2024 Nordic Darts Masters =

2024 Mr Vegas Nordic Darts Masters

Tournament information
- Dates: 7–8 June 2024
- Venue: Forum Copenhagen
- Location: Copenhagen
- Country: Denmark
- Organisation(s): PDC
- Format: Legs
- Prize fund: £60,000
- Winner's share: £20,000
- High checkout: 170 Rob Cross

Champion(s)
- Gerwyn Price

The 2024 Mr Vegas Nordic Darts Masters was a professional darts tournament that was held at the Forum Copenhagen in Copenhagen, Denmark from 7–8 June 2024. It was the third staging of the event by the Professional Darts Corporation and the fourth event in the 2024 World Series of Darts. The tournament featured 16 players (eight top-ranking players and eight regional qualifiers).

Peter Wright was the defending champion after defeating Gerwyn Price 11–5 in the 2023 final. However, he lost 6–5 in the first round to Johan Engström.

Price won his fourth World Series event after beating Rob Cross 8–5 in the final.

== Prize money ==
The total prize fund was £60,000.

Position (no. of players)		Prize money (Total: £60,000)
Winner	(1)	£20,000
Runner-up	(1)	£10,000
Semi-finalists	(2)	£5,000
Quarter-finalists	(4)	£2,500
First round	(8)	£1,250

== Qualifiers ==
The PDC announced the eight players who would be their elite representatives at the event on 20 March. However, on 6 May, it was announced that 2024 Masters champion Stephen Bunting would replace Michael van Gerwen in the field.

The seedings were based on the 2024 World Series rankings after 3 events:

1. Gerwyn Price (champion)
2. Rob Cross (runner-up)
3. Luke Humphries (semi-finals)
4. Michael Smith (semi-finals)
5. Nathan Aspinall (quarter-finals)
6. Peter Wright (first round)
7. Dimitri Van den Bergh (quarter-finals)
8. Stephen Bunting (quarter-finals)

The three Nordic and Baltic PDC Tour Card holders were joined by five qualifiers from the PDC Nordic & Baltic tour.

Qualification	Player
PDC Tour Card Holders	Madars Razma (first round)
PDC Tour Card Holders	Benjamin Drue Reus (first round)
PDC Tour Card Holders	Jeffrey de Graaf (first round)
PDC Nordic and Baltic Qualiiers	Marko Kantele (first round)
PDC Nordic and Baltic Qualiiers	Johan Engström (quarter-finals)
PDC Nordic and Baltic Qualiiers	Paavo Myller (first round)
PDC Nordic and Baltic Qualiiers	Dennis Nilsson (first round)
PDC Nordic and Baltic Qualiiers	Daniel Larsson (first round)

== Draw ==
The draw was made on 4 June.

First round (best of 11 legs); 7 June
1	Gerwyn Price 102.73	6
Madars Razma 84.95	2
Dimitri Van den Bergh 96.53	6
Dennis Nilsson 90.57	3
4	Michael Smith 102.56	6
Paavo Myller 78.91	1
Nathan Aspinall 91.70	6
Marko Kantele 82.00	2
2	Rob Cross 108.19	6
Jeffrey de Graaf 102.25	4
Stephen Bunting 87.83	6
Daniel Larsson 84.53	5
3	Luke Humphries 100.20	6
Benjamin Drue Reus 91.79	0
Peter Wright 93.02	5
Johan Engström 92.96	6

Quarter-finals (best of 11 legs); 8 June
1	Gerwyn Price 104.97	6
Dimitri Van den Bergh 93.16	1
4	Michael Smith 90.43	6
Nathan Aspinall 99.40	3
2	Rob Cross 102.61	6
Stephen Bunting 100.56	2
3	Luke Humphries 98.16	6
Johan Engström 94.47	1

Semi-finals (best of 13 legs); 8 June
1	Gerwyn Price 86.08	7
4	Michael Smith 91.49	3
2	Rob Cross 100.19	7
3	Luke Humphries 101.04	4

Final (best of 15 legs); 8 June
1	Gerwyn Price 96.47	8
2	Rob Cross 91.68	5
