= 2023 Bahrain Darts Masters =

Tournament information
- Dates: 12–13 January 2023
- Venue: Bahrain International Circuit
- Location: Sakhir, Bahrain
- Organisation(s): Professional Darts Corporation (PDC)
- Format: Legs
- Prize fund: £60,000
- Winner's share: £20,000
- High checkout: 157 Jonny Clayton

Champion(s)
- Michael Smith (ENG)

The 2023 Bahrain Darts Masters was the first staging of the tournament by the Professional Darts Corporation. It was the first event in the 2023 World Series of Darts. The tournament featured 16 players (8 PDC representatives and 8 Asian representatives), and was held at the Bahrain International Circuit in Sakhir, Bahrain on 12–13 January 2023.

Michael Smith won the inaugural staging of the event, and his third World Series title, defeating Gerwyn Price 8–6 in the final.

The event was announced on 26 September 2022, alongside the 2023 Nordic Darts Masters, which are to be held a week later.

== Prize money ==
The total prize fund is expected to be at £60,000.

Position (no. of players)		Prize money (Total: £60,000)
Winner	(1)	£20,000
Runner-up	(1)	£10,000
Semi-finalists	(2)	£5,000
Quarter-finalists	(4)	£2,500
First round	(8)	£1,250

== Qualifiers ==
The PDC announced 7 of their 8 players who are their elite representatives at the event on 13 December 2022, and did not include Michael van Gerwen, who couldn't attend for family reasons. Jonny Clayton was announced as the 8th representative on 4 January 2023.

As this was the first World Series event of the year, the PDC representatives were seeded based on their positions on the PDC Order of Merit following the 2023 PDC World Darts Championship.

1. Michael Smith (champion)
2. Peter Wright (quarter-finals)
3. Gerwyn Price (runner-up)
4. Luke Humphries (quarter-finals)
5. Rob Cross (semi-finals)
6. Jonny Clayton (quarter-finals)
7. Dimitri Van den Bergh (quarter-finals)
8. Raymond van Barneveld (semi-finals)

The Asian representatives consisted of six invited players, alongside 2 Bahrain qualifiers that were decided in a qualifier held on 17–18 December 2022.

Qualification	Player
Asian Invitees	Paul Lim (first round)
Asian Invitees	Toru Suzuki (first round)
Asian Invitees	Man Lok Leung (first round)
Asian Invitees	Yuki Yamada (first round)
Asian Invitees	Nitin Kumar (first round)
Asian Invitees	Alain Abiabi (first round)
Bahrain qualifiers	Bassim Mahmood (first round)
Bahrain qualifiers	Abdulnaser Yusuf (first round)

== Draw ==
The draw was announced on 10 January 2023.

First round (best of 11 legs); 12 January
1	Michael Smith 96.30	6
Abdulnaser Yusuf 63.15	1
Dimitri Van den Bergh 88.38	6
Alain Abiabi 82.62	5
4	Luke Humphries 90.78	6
Man Lok Leung 91.64	3
Raymond van Barneveld 98.16	6
Yuki Yamada 84.64	2
2	Peter Wright 91.34	6
Toru Suzuki 83.98	3
Rob Cross 95.09	6
Nitin Kumar 79.25	2
3	Gerwyn Price 96.63	6
Paul Lim 87.66	2
Jonny Clayton 103.66	6
Bassim Mahmood 78.00	0

Quarter-finals (best of 11 legs); 13 January
1	Michael Smith 84.59	6
Dimitri Van den Bergh 86.80	4
4	Luke Humphries 96.28	5
Raymond van Barneveld 101.10	6
2	Peter Wright 93.88	5
Rob Cross 88.50	6
3	Gerwyn Price 101.23	6
Jonny Clayton 98.12	4

Semi-finals (best of 13 legs); 13 January
1	Michael Smith 98.28	7
Raymond van Barneveld 95.81	5
Rob Cross 96.73	3
3	Gerwyn Price 94.14	7

Final (best of 15 legs); 13 January
1	Michael Smith 96.77	8
3	Gerwyn Price 97.88	6
