= 2023 Nordic Darts Masters =

2023 Viaplay Nordic Darts Masters

Tournament information
- Dates: 20–21 January 2023
- Venue: Forum Copenhagen
- Location: Copenhagen
- Country: Denmark
- Organisation(s): PDC
- Format: Legs
- Prize fund: £60,000
- Winner's share: £20,000
- High checkout: 156 Gerwyn Price

Champion(s)
- Peter Wright

The 2023 Viaplay Nordic Darts Masters was the third staging of the Nordic Darts Masters tournament by the Professional Darts Corporation, and the second entry in the 2023 World Series of Darts. The tournament featured 16 players (eight 'elite' PDC players and eight regional qualifiers) and was held at the Forum Copenhagen in Copenhagen, Denmark on 20–21 January 2023.

Dimitri Van den Bergh was the defending champion, after defeating Gary Anderson 11–5 in the 2022 final. However, he lost to Gerwyn Price in the quarter-finals. Price then lost to Peter Wright in the final, with Wright winning his fourth World Series title, his first since 2019, when he won the German Darts Masters.

== Prize money ==
The total prize fund remained at £60,000.

Position (no. of players)		Prize money (Total: £60,000)
Winner	(1)	£20,000
Runner-up	(1)	£10,000
Semi-finalists	(2)	£5,000
Quarter-finalists	(4)	£2,500
First round	(8)	£1,250

== Qualifiers ==
The PDC announced 7 of their 8 players who would be their elite representatives at the event on 2 January 2023, which included Michael van Gerwen, who missed the 2023 Bahrain Darts Masters for family reasons. Jonny Clayton was announced as the 8th representative on 4 January 2023.

The seedings are based on the 2023 World Series rankings after 1 event.

1. Michael Smith (semi-finals)
2. Gerwyn Price (runner-up)
3. Rob Cross (quarter-finals)
4. Peter Wright (champion)
5. Luke Humphries (quarter-finals)
6. Jonny Clayton (semi-finals)
7. Dimitri Van den Bergh (quarter-finals)
8. Michael van Gerwen (quarter-finals)

The Nordic & Baltic representatives consisted of their three Tour Card holders (Madars Razma, Darius Labanauskas and Vladimir Andersen), recent World Darts Championship qualifier Daniel Larsson, and four invited players from the region.

Qualification	Player
PDCNB Tour card holders	Darius Labanauskas (first round)
PDCNB Tour card holders	Madars Razma (first round)
PDCNB Tour card holders	Vladimir Andersen (first round)
2022 PDCNB Order of Merit Leaders	Dennis Nilsson (first round)
2022 PDCNB Order of Merit Leaders	Benjamin Drue Reus (first round)
2022 PDCNB Order of Merit Leaders	Daniel Larsson (first round)
2022 PDCNB Order of Merit Leaders	Marko Kantele (first round)
2022 PDCNB Order of Merit Leaders	Andreas Harrysson (first round)

== Draw ==
The draw was made on 16 January 2023.

First round (best of 11 legs); 20 January
1	Michael Smith 92.02	6
Darius Labanauskas 82.13	0
Luke Humphries 98.12	6
Marko Kantele 82.60	1
4	Peter Wright 94.20	6
Dennis Nilsson 87.47	5
Michael van Gerwen 91.58	6
Andreas Harrysson 82.49	3
2	Gerwyn Price 98.02	6
Benjamin Drue Reus 82.45	0
Dimitri Van den Bergh 101.95	6
Madars Razma 83.92	2
3	Rob Cross 92.97	6
Vladimir Andersen 79.65	1
Jonny Clayton 84.10	6
Daniel Larsson 80.98	3

Quarter-finals (best of 19 legs); 22 January
1	Michael Smith 95.11	10
Luke Humphries 97.69	7
4	Peter Wright 97.13	10
Michael van Gerwen 98.25	9
2	Gerwyn Price 100.79	10
Dimitri Van den Bergh 101.35	7
3	Rob Cross 96.29	4
Jonny Clayton 94.38	10

Semi-finals (best of 21 legs); 22 January
1	Michael Smith 96.32	8
4	Peter Wright 95.43	11
2	Gerwyn Price 100.95	11
Jonny Clayton 95.95	10

Final (best of 21 legs); 22 January
4	Peter Wright 102.28	11
2	Gerwyn Price 97.39	5
