= 2022 Nordic Darts Masters =

2022 Viaplay Nordic Darts Masters

Tournament information
- Dates: 10–11 June 2022
- Venue: Forum Copenhagen
- Location: Copenhagen
- Country: Denmark
- Organisation(s): PDC
- Format: Legs
- Prize fund: £60,000
- Winner's share: £20,000
- High checkout: 157 Michael van Gerwen

Champion(s)
- Dimitri Van den Bergh

The 2022 Viaplay Nordic Darts Masters was the second staging of the tournament by the Professional Darts Corporation, and the second entry in the 2022 World Series of Darts. The tournament featured 16 players (eight 'elite' PDC players and eight regional qualifiers) and was held at the Forum Copenhagen in Copenhagen, Denmark on 10–11 June 2022.

Michael van Gerwen was the defending champion after defeating Fallon Sherrock 11–7 in the 2021 final, but he lost to James Wade in the quarter-finals.

Dimitri Van den Bergh won his first World Series of Darts title after defeating Gary Anderson 11–5 in the final.

== Prize money ==
The total prize fund remained at £60,000.

Position (no. of players)		Prize money (Total: £60,000)
Winner	(1)	£20,000
Runner-up	(1)	£10,000
Semi-finalists	(2)	£5,000
Quarter-finalists	(4)	£2,500
First round	(8)	£1,250

== Qualifiers ==
The PDC announced the 8 players who would be their representatives at the event on 11 April 2022, including Fallon Sherrock, who was denied her chance to appear on the 2020 World Series of Darts circuit, owing to the COVID-19 pandemic.

The seedings were based on the results from previous World Series event held earlier in the year.

1. Michael Smith (semi-finals)
2. Michael van Gerwen (quarter-finals)
3. Peter Wright (quarter-finals)
4. Gerwyn Price (quarter-finals)
5. James Wade (semi-finals)
6. Gary Anderson (runner-up)
7. Fallon Sherrock (quarter-finals)
8. Dimitri Van den Bergh (champion)

The Nordic qualifiers consisted of their three PDC Tour card holders (Darius Labanauskas, Madars Razma and Vladimir Andersen), plus the two highest ranking players on the PDC European Tour Order of Merit from Denmark, as well as the highest ranked players from Sweden, Finland and Iceland.

Qualification	Player
PDC Tour card holders	Darius Labanauskas (first round)
PDC Tour card holders	Madars Razma (first round)
PDC Tour card holders	Vladimir Andersen (first round)
#1 Ranked Danish Player	Benjamin Drue Reus (first round)
#2 Ranked Danish Player	Brian Løkken (first round)
#1 Ranked Swedish Player	Daniel Larsson (first round)
#1 Ranked Finnish Player	Marko Kantele (first round)
#1 Ranked Icelandic Player	Matthías Örn Friðriksson (first round)

== Draw ==
The draw was made on June 8 by Barry Hearn.

First round (best of 11 legs); 10 June
1	Michael Smith 93.94	6
Vladimir Andersen 79.90	2
Fallon Sherrock 80.13	6
Darius Labanauskas 76.28	1
4	Gerwyn Price 90.78	6
Brian Løkken 72.60	2
Dimitri Van den Bergh 98.02	6
Benjamin Drue Reus 76.00	0
2	Michael van Gerwen 97.06	6
Marko Kantele 74.78	1
James Wade 89.21	6
Madars Razma 90.81	3
3	Peter Wright 103.66	6
Matthías Örn Friðriksson 64.64	0
Gary Anderson 87.83	6
Daniel Larsson 80.88	5

Quarter-finals (best of 19 legs); 11 June
1	Michael Smith 94.75	10
Fallon Sherrock 89.00	6
4	Gerwyn Price 93.63	5
Dimitri Van den Bergh 99.38	10
2	Michael van Gerwen 90.74	4
James Wade 90.14	10
3	Peter Wright 99.99	4
Gary Anderson 103.50	10

Semi-finals (best of 21 legs); 11 June
1	Michael Smith 87.22	4
Dimitri Van den Bergh 97.27	11
James Wade 90.63	7
Gary Anderson 89.31	11

Final (best of 21 legs); 11 June
Dimitri Van den Bergh 98.16	11
Gary Anderson 93.78	5
