= 2023 World Series of Darts =

Darts tournament

The 2023 World Series of Darts was a series of televised darts tournaments organised by the Professional Darts Corporation. Six World Series events and one finals event, which like the previous year took place in Amsterdam, Netherlands, were held.

Two new venues made there debuts with Bahrain International Circuit hosting the Bahrain Masters and the Arena COS Torwar hosting the Poland Masters for the first time.

== Prize money ==
International events
| Stage | Prize money |
|---|---|
| Winner | £20,000 |
| Runner-up | £10,000 |
| Semi-finals | £5,000 |
| Quarter-finals | £2,500 |
| First round | £1,250 |
| Total | £60,000 |

Finals
| Stage | Prize money |
|---|---|
| Winner | £70,000 |
| Runner-up | £30,000 |
| Semi-finals | £20,000 |
| Quarter-finals | £15,000 |
| Second round | £7,500 |
| First round | £5,000 |
| Total | £300,000 |

== World Series events ==
| No. | Date | Event | Venue | Champion | Legs | Runner-up | Ref |
|---|---|---|---|---|---|---|---|
| 1 | 12–13 January | Bahrain Masters | Sakhir, Bahrain International Circuit | Michael Smith | 8–6 | Gerwyn Price | |
| 2 | 20–21 January | Nordic Darts Masters | (Denmark) Copenhagen, Forum Copenhagen | Peter Wright | 11–5 | Gerwyn Price | |
| 3 | 2–3 June | US Masters | (United States) New York City, The Theater | Michael van Gerwen | 8–0 | Jeff Smith | |
| 4 | 7–8 July | Poland Masters | (Poland) Warsaw, Arena COS Torwar | Michael van Gerwen | 8–3 | Dimitri Van den Bergh | |
| 5 | 4–5 August | New Zealand Masters | (New Zealand) Hamilton, Globox Arena | Rob Cross | 8–7 | Nathan Aspinall | |
| 6 | 11–12 August | New South Wales Masters | (Australia) Wollongong, WIN Entertainment Centre | Rob Cross | 8–1 | Damon Heta | |
| 7 | 15–17 September | World Series of Darts Finals | (Netherlands) Amsterdam, AFAS Live | Michael van Gerwen | 11–4 | Nathan Aspinall | |
