= Professional Darts Corporation =

Professional darts organisation

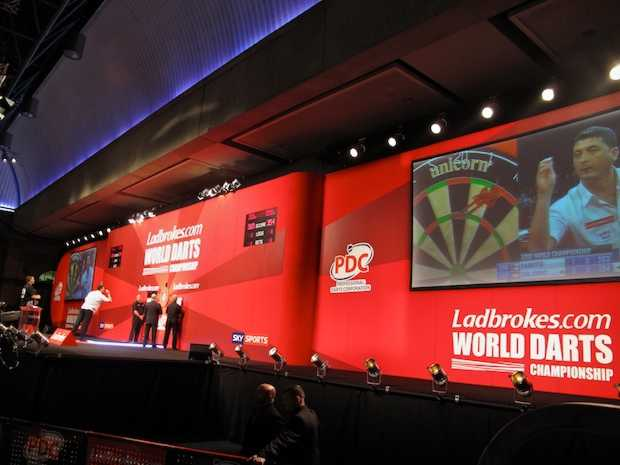
- Photo of the stage at the 2010 PDC World Darts Championship
- Abbreviation: PDC
- Formation: 16 January 1992; 34 years ago
- Type: Professional darts organisation
- Headquarters: Mascalls, Mascalls Lane; Brentwood, Essex; CM14 5LJ; England, United Kingdom
- Members: 221
- Chairman: Eddie Hearn
- Chief Executive: Matthew Porter
- Staff: 30
- Website: www.pdc.tv
- Formerly called: World Darts Council

The Professional Darts Corporation (PDC) is a professional darts organisation in the United Kingdom, established in 1992 when a group of leading players split from the British Darts Organisation (BDO) to form what was initially called the World Darts Council (WDC). Sports promoter Eddie Hearn is the PDC chairman.

The PDC developed and holds several competitions, including the annual PDC World Darts Championship, the World Matchplay, World Grand Prix, UK Open, Premier League, and Grand Slam. It also runs its own world rankings based on players' performances.

== History ==
Darts experienced a boom in the late 1970s and early 1980s. Several major tournaments were televised on the BBC and ITV, which allowed the top players to make a full-time living from the sport and turn professional. However, darts steadily dropped from television schedules and By 1989, the Embassy World Championship was the only major televised darts event in the UK. Some of the players felt that not enough was being done by the governing body, the British Darts Organisation, to encourage new sponsors into the sport and arrange more television coverage. BDO chairman Olly Croft stated "I don't owe any darts players a living." and refused to guarantee more televised tournaments or permit the players to organise their own tournaments.

As a result, 16 professional players, including every previous BDO world champion who was still active in the game, created their own darts organisation, the World Darts Council (WDC), in January 1992. The players were led by sports promoters Tommy Cox and Dick Allix, both of whom used their own money to fund the fledgling organisation.

The badges worn by WDC players at the 1993 World Championship

They wanted to appoint a PR consultant to improve the image of the game. The 1993 Embassy World Championship was the last time there was one unified world championship. The WDC players wore their new insignia on their sleeves during the tournament but were told to remove them by the BDO. The WDC players decided that if they were not going to be recognised by the BDO they would no longer play in the Embassy tournament.

The BDO took the step of banning the rebel players from playing in county darts and even threatened to ban any player who participated in exhibition events with WDC players.

=== Tomlin order ===
The WDC players took the matter to court in a dispute which accrued large and perhaps unaffordable costs during a protracted legal process. The two bodies reached an out-of-court settlement on 30 June 1997 in the form of a Tomlin order.

The BDO recognised the WDC and agreed that all players shall have the freedom of choice as to which open events they wish to play in. The WDC dropped its claim to be a world governing body and renamed itself the Professional Darts Corporation. The PDC accepted and recognized the World Darts Federation (WDF) as the governing body for the sport of darts worldwide, and the BDO the governing body for darts in the UK. The stated purpose of the agreement was to promote the freedom of individual darts players to participate freely in open competition.

Another condition of this Tomlin order is that the top 16 players, and any Home Country players ranked between 17 and 32 in each year's BDO Championship, and the top 16 players in each year's PDC Championship, shall not be permitted to enter the other competition in the immediate following year.

Despite this condition, Raymond van Barneveld switched to the PDC within weeks of reaching the 2006 BDO final, later playing in (and winning) the 2007 PDC World Championship – the Tomlin order should have made him ineligible to play.

There was further controversy following the 2007 BDO World Championship, when Jelle Klaasen announced that he would be switching to the PDC. As a BDO World Champion, he signed a three-year deal in 2006 to return to the Lakeside event. The BDO threatened to take legal action for breach of contract, but with previous damage and costs incurred by other legal cases it has become less likely that any action will be taken in future with regards to player contracts and the Tomlin Order. 2007 semi-finalist Mervyn King also moved to the PDC, seemingly against the contracted condition that semi-finalists and finalists were bound to appear the next year.

In January 2012, the PDC invited the four semi-finalists of the BDO world championships, after obtaining a written agreement to release any player without penalty. Ted Hankey was the first player to move, as well as several players (who were not guaranteed a pro tour card due to not reaching the BDO semi finals) entering the PDC qualifying school, including Dean Winstanley, Tony West, Steve West, and Stuart Kellett.

== Television coverage ==
Following the breakaway group's first televised event in 1992 (the Lada UK Masters on Anglia Television), satellite broadcaster Sky Sports signed a deal to exclusively cover three PDC tournaments each year. To capitalise on its investment, the channel introduced a number of new techniques to make the coverage more interesting for armchair fans.

Unlike the BDO world championship, which was covered via the general entertainment BBC Two channel, Sky's dedicated sports channel allowed the PDC matches to be covered in their entirety. Over ten hours per day of live darts on Sky Sports is not uncommon. The British Darts Organisation's events were more limited to selected matches and highlights, although in later years the BBC increased its interactive TV coverage, allowing viewers to see many more events live.

Sky television is an advertisement and subscription based channel, and generally after each set a commercial break is taken. Planet Funk's 2000 single "Chase the Sun" is played in the auditorium and it has become a cult track amongst darts fans, who tend to dance along to the tune during the breaks.

Currently Sky Sports broadcasts six tournaments live each year in both Ireland and the United Kingdom. PDC events are also televised in Australia, Belgium, Germany, Hungary, India, Japan, the Netherlands, Norway, Singapore, South Africa and the United States (One World Sports).

The PDC signed a three-year deal with ITV in 2007 with the inaugural Grand Slam of Darts from 2007 and the inaugural Players Championship from 2009. The matches are shown live on ITV4 with highlights on ITV1. ITV being an advertisement channel like Sky Sports, commercial breaks are taken after 5 legs; the tournaments that ITV cover do not play in sets. The Fratellis 2006 single "Chelsea Dagger" is played during the breaks on ITV. In 2010, Bravo signed a contract to show the European Championships.

In 2007, Sky Sports decided to extend their coverage of the Premier League Darts to 2010 following the high number of viewers to previous tournaments.

In February 2016, it was announced the BBC would cover the PDC for the first time with a new tournament being formed using the top 8 players on the PDC Order of Merit after the World Matchplay, known as the Champions League of Darts. As a result, the BBC dropped coverage of the BDO World Darts Championship, which they covered from 1978 to 2016 (this was the original World Championship prior to the formation of the PDC). DJ Ötzi's "Hey! Baby" is played during the breaks on the BBC.

=== Cameras ===
Sky Sports introduced more cameras to cover the sport, and many of these innovations have been copied by other broadcasters.

Unique flight cams show the trajectory of the dart through the air in slow motion to sometimes surprising results. A tiny camera has also been inserted into the dartboard itself beside the number 16 – one of the most common doubles – that shows the darts being thrown towards the board. Sky Sports have also used a player cam; a tiny camera was fitted to Dennis Priestley's shirt to capture his view of the action while playing.

Elsewhere, floating video cameras capture the action of the watching crowds. Spectators become far more animated and vocal than their BDO counterparts, often acting similar to a football crowd, while holding up humorous placards – often featuring corny puns – regarding the players, and chanting or singing various songs related to the players or to the event in general. Some supporters even wear face paint or crazy costumes or they dress up as their favourite player via their trademark attire or customary nickname.

The players' wives have also been a focus for the cameras, as they cheered on their husbands. In January 2005, Sky One commissioned a programme entitled Darts Players' Wives, primarily focusing on the wives and their relationships.

In December 2008, Sky started to broadcast darts in High Definition (with the exception of the final Las Vegas Desert Classic in 2009), and in July 2010 (at the World Matchplay), broadcast the Semi Finals and Final in 3D to around 1,000 licensed premises in the UK and Republic of Ireland.

Another frequent cam is a split-screen camera, with the players on the right, and the dartboard on the left. If the first two darts hit the triple 20, the camera will zoom in to the spot before the third dart is thrown.

=== Commentators ===
John Gwynne covered 20 PDC World Championships and 20 PDC World Matchplays, from the inaugural 1994 WDC World Darts Championship until his retirement in 2013. Dave Lanning covered all events up until December 2010, when he retired. Contrary to popular belief, long-time BBC darts commentator Sid Waddell did not switch allegiances to Sky until after the 1994 BDO World Championship. He brought his own unique brand of commentary to the game, and was a cult figure amongst darts fans and sport fans alike. He continued to commentate until his death in 2012.

The current commentators on Sky include John McDonald (commentator), Rod Studd, Stuart Pyke, Dan Dawson, retired player Wayne Mardle and former World Champions John Part and Mark Webster. Jeff Stelling was the original presenter of Sky Sports' darts coverage, before Dave Clark took over in 2002. Clark retired in 2020, since when Emma Paton has been the lead presenter. In addition, the 2005 Premier League was fronted by Gary Newbon.

ITV events were fronted by Matt Smith from 2007 to 2014 but are now hosted by Jacqui Oatley from 2015 who became the first regular female darts host in the UK. Commentary for ITV has been provided by John Rawling, Alan Warriner-Little & Pyke since 2007 with Chris Mason joining the coverage in 2008. Former darts commentators for ITV include Jim Proudfoot, Peter Drury and Steve Beaton. Ned Boulting presents features and interviews and deputises if the presenter is unavailable.

BBC Sport showed the inaugural PDC Champions League of Darts on BBC One and BBC Two, with 16 hours of coverage over two days presented by BBC Final Score presenter Jason Mohammad alongside PDC professionals Mark Webster, Paul Nicholson and Warriner-Little, commentary by long time BBC darts commentator Vassos Alexander and PDC online reporter and commentator Dan Dawson with reports by Caroline Barker.

Bravo employed James Richardson and Dave Gorman to front its coverage until the channel closed in 2011.

== Image ==
The PDC sought to attract a younger audience of all genders for darts and market the game as a night out rather than just as a sporting event. Through the years, it was not uncommon to see politicians, musicians, football players, boxers and other sporting personalities attending their events. The British Darts Organisation have subsequently sought to emulate most of these innovations.

Players enter matches with their own signature theme music whilst flanked by security men and, until 2017, female valets down to the oche. A "big-time" atmosphere was also created by using smoke machines and pyrotechnics during these sometimes elaborate entrances, similar to those used in boxing or wrestling.

At the oche, players only drink iced water during matches. Though this was intended to further the game's image, which had been tarnished by players' reputation for consuming large quantities of alcohol. The water is also needed to prevent dehydration: with the many lights and packed crowds, temperatures have been measured at over 38-degree Celsius (100-degree Fahrenheit) during some games.

Inside the venues, action is relayed via giant video screens for the large crowds. The BDO now also has video screens, while maintaining their traditional "light boards" of lightbulbs, showing where each dart lands for the benefit of the crowd.

=== Nicknames ===
Eric Bristow, the most successful player in the first few years of the World Championship, had his nickname "The Crafty Cockney" emblazoned on the back of his shirt. Very few dart players had their own nicknames until the Professional Darts Corporation circuit made it almost customary for every player to acquire a nickname. This helps to create a new generation of characters with which its audience could identify.

Sky TV commentator Sid Waddell attempted to christen Phil Taylor "The Crafty Potter" – referring to him being both a protégé of Bristow and originating from the Potteries. However, the tag never caught on and it was not until a later tournament that he came out to the tune The Power by Snap! that his nickname was accidentally born.

Jamie Harvey from Scotland became "Bravedart" – a play on words from Mel Gibson's Braveheart film. Sky Sports even filmed vignettes where a kilt wearing Jamie had his face painted blue and ran through woods throwing his darts whilst looking menacing.

As the only player to wear a shirt, tie and waistcoat whilst playing, Rod Harrington's "Prince of Style" tag appeared apt.

Though originally from the BDO circuit, Wayne Mardle is known as "Hawaii Five-O-One" due to his colourful Hawaiian shirts (a play on words on Hawaii Five-O and the starting score in a leg of darts).

Bob Anderson, now living in Clevedon in Somerset, is known as The Limestone Cowboy, after the limestone hills of Wiltshire where Bob used to live, and the fact that he enjoys Country and Western music. This was once taken even further, with Anderson once walking to the stage accompanied by a horse.

== Current tournaments ==
The Professional Darts Corporation has continued to increase its annual UK televised tournaments in recent years: The World Championship, The Premier League, World Cup of Darts, World Grand Prix and World Matchplay are all covered live by Sky Sports. The US Open was shown on Challenge in 2007 and Nuts TV in 2008. Bravo broadcast the European Championships for the first time in 2010, after ITV4 televised the first running in 2008. ITV4 won back the coverage for the European Championship; they also show live coverage of the World Series of Darts, Players Championship, UK Open and the Masters.

== Ranked tournaments ==
=== World Championship ===
The World Championship is a single-elimination seeded tournament beginning in mid December and finishing in early January. It is the biggest of the PDC tournaments and has the largest prize fund of any darts competition. Held at the Circus Tavern, Purfleet between 1994 and 2007, the championship moved to a bigger venue at Alexandra Palace from 2008.

Phil Taylor has dominated this tournament, reaching the final for the first 14 years between 1994 and 2007 and winning fourteen titles, including eight successive titles between 1995 and 2002. The PDC World Champions have also shared eight BDO World Championships between them, with Van Barneveld winning four, Taylor two, and Part and Priestley one each. These are usually added to each player's haul when describing their achievements – hence Taylor is a 16-time champion, van Barneveld 5, Part 3 and Priestley 2.

Previous Winners (1994–2026)

Titles	Name	Years won
14	(England) Phil Taylor	1995; 1996; 1997; 1998; 1999; 2000; 2001; 2002; 2004; 2005; 2006; 2009; 2010; 2013
3	(Netherlands) Michael van Gerwen	2014; 2017; 2019
2	(Canada) John Part	2003; 2008
2	(England) Adrian Lewis	2011; 2012
2	(Scotland) Gary Anderson	2015; 2016
2	(Scotland) Peter Wright	2020; 2022
2	(England) Luke Littler	2025; 2026
1	(England) Dennis Priestley	1994
1	(Netherlands) Raymond van Barneveld	2007
1	(England) Rob Cross	2018
1	(Wales) Gerwyn Price	2021
1	(England) Michael Smith	2023
1	(England) Luke Humphries	2024

=== UK Open ===
Held each year in June at the Reebok Stadium in Bolton (2003–2013), and from 2014 in March at Butlins, Minehead, the UK Open is played over three days with 168 players in a single elimination tournament. After each round a draw is held where there is no protection for seeded players. This has earned it the nickname The FA Cup of darts. Phil Taylor is the most successful player in the tournament's history, with five victories.

Previous Winners (2003–26)

Titles	Name	Years won
5	(England) Phil Taylor	2003; 2005; 2009; 2010; 2013
3	(England) James Wade	2008; 2011; 2021
3	(Netherlands) Michael van Gerwen	2015; 2016; 2020
2	(Netherlands) Raymond van Barneveld	2006; 2007
2	(England) Luke Littler	2025; 2026
1	(Netherlands) Roland Scholten	2004
1	(Scotland) Robert Thornton	2012
1	(England) Adrian Lewis	2014
1	(Scotland) Peter Wright	2017
1	(Scotland) Gary Anderson	2018
1	(England) Nathan Aspinall	2019
1	(Netherlands) Danny Noppert	2022
1	(England) Andrew Gilding	2023
1	(Belgium) Dimitri Van den Bergh	2024

=== World Matchplay ===
Crowds exceeding 2,000 in number assemble at the Winter Gardens in Blackpool, the longest serving venue in the PDC. Matches are contested over legs rather than sets, presenting the prospect of some surprising results and upsets. Phil Taylor has been the dominant player in this event, winning 16 titles and being undefeated in his first 15 finals.

Previous Winners (1994–2026)

Titles	Name	Years won
16	(England) Phil Taylor	1995; 1997; 2000; 2001; 2002; 2003; 2004; 2006; 2008; 2009; 2010; 2011; 2012; 2013; 2014; 2017
3	(Netherlands) Michael van Gerwen	2015; 2016; 2022
2	(England) Rod Harrington	1998; 1999
2	Luke Littler	2025; 2026
1	(United States) Larry Butler	1994
1	(England) Peter Evison	1996
1	(England) Colin Lloyd	2005
1	(England) James Wade	2007
1	(Scotland) Gary Anderson	2018
1	(England) Rob Cross	2019
1	(Belgium) Dimitri Van den Bergh	2020
1	Peter Wright	2021
1	Nathan Aspinall	2023
1	Luke Humphries	2024

=== World Grand Prix ===
The World Grand Prix replaced the World Pairs event in 1998. Its original venue was the Casino Rooms in Rochester, Kent until 1999, with one staging in Rosslare in 2000 before moving in 2001 to its current home at the CityWest Hotel in Dublin, Ireland. However, owing to the COVID-19 pandemic, the tournament has been back in England since 2020.

This tournament has shorter opening rounds and players must commence and finish each leg on a double including the option of the bull, which is a format not used in any other major televised event. Taylor dominated the event from its inception until 2013, with 11 victories.

Previous Winners (1998–2026)

Titles	Name	Years won
11	(England) Phil Taylor	1998; 1999; 2000; 2002; 2003; 2005; 2006; 2008; 2009; 2011; 2013
6	(Netherlands) Michael van Gerwen	2012; 2014; 2016; 2018; 2019; 2022
2	(England) James Wade	2007; 2010
2	(England) Luke Humphries	2023; 2026
1	(England) Alan Warriner-Little	2001
1	(England) Colin Lloyd	2004
1	(Scotland) Robert Thornton	2015
1	(Northern Ireland) Daryl Gurney	2017
1	(Wales) Gerwyn Price	2020
1	(Wales) Jonny Clayton	2021
1	(Belgium) Mike De Decker	2024
1	(England) Luke Littler	2025

=== Grand Slam of Darts ===
Introduced in 2007, the Grand Slam was the first tournament staged in the UK to feature players from the two different organisations, the PDC and BDO. Players who had reached the finals of each organisations major tournaments for the previous two years were invited to compete in the Grand Slam. It is held over 9 days during November and shown live on Sky Sports. The first four tournaments were shown live on ITV4, and the 2007 Grand Slam of Darts was ITV's first networked darts tournament since ending its darts coverage in 1988.

Previous Winners (2007–26)

Titles	Name	Years won
6	(England) Phil Taylor	2007; 2008; 2009; 2011; 2013; 2014
4	(Wales) Gerwyn Price	2018; 2019; 2021; 2026
3	(Netherlands) Michael van Gerwen	2015; 2016; 2017
2	(England) Luke Littler	2024; 2025
1	(England) Scott Waites	2010
1	(Netherlands) Raymond van Barneveld	2012
1	(Portugal) José de Sousa	2020
1	(England) Michael Smith	2022
1	(England) Luke Humphries	2023

=== Players Championship Finals ===
Introduced in 2009, this tournament was open to the top 32 players on the Players Championship Order of Merit until 2015. In 2016 the tournament was expanded to 64 players still using the Players Championship Order of Merit. It is broadcast live on ITV4.

Previous Winners (2009–25)

Titles	Name	Years won
7	(Netherlands) Michael van Gerwen	2013; 2015; 2016; 2017; 2019; 2020; 2022
3	(England) Phil Taylor	2009; 2011; 2012
2	Luke Humphries	2023; 2024
1	(Australia) Paul Nicholson	2010
1	(England) Kevin Painter	2011
1	(Scotland) Gary Anderson	2014
1	(Northern Ireland) Daryl Gurney	2018
1	Peter Wright	2021
1	Luke Littler	2025

=== European Championship ===
The European Championship is a tournament that allows the top players in Europe to compete against the top players in the PDC Order of Merit. In 2016 it changed to the top 32 in the European tour Order of Merit. It started in 2008 and for the first six years had a £200,000 prize fund. It has increased since then. Phil Taylor won the first four editions of the tournament, before Simon Whitlock scooped his first, and so far only, major title in 2012.

Previous Winners (2008–26)

Titles	Name	Years won
4	(England) Phil Taylor	2008; 2009; 2010; 2011
4	(Netherlands) Michael van Gerwen	2014; 2015; 2016; 2017
2	(England) Rob Cross	2019; 2021
2	(Scotland) Peter Wright	2020; 2023
2	(England) Ross Smith	2022; 2026
1	(Australia) Simon Whitlock	2012
1	(England) Adrian Lewis	2013
1	(England) James Wade	2018
1	(England) Ritchie Edhouse	2024
1	(Netherlands) Gian van Veen	2025

=== World Masters ===
Previous Winners (2025-2026)

Titles	Name	Years won
1	(England) Luke Humphries	2025
1	(England) Luke Littler	2026

== Non-ranked tournaments ==
=== Premier League Darts ===
In 2005, Sky Sports launched the Premier League Darts television programme. For five months, ten of the biggest names from the PDC circuit compete in a league table, with matches held across the country at different venues. Phil Taylor topped the table after the weekly rounds for the first eight instances the Premier League has been staged, going on to win the play-offs six times. Taylor's reign ended when Michael van Gerwen joined the league in 2013 and topped the table after the weekly rounds in each of the seven times since, winning five times. Glen Durrant was the third player to top the table, doing so in his debut year in 2020. Jonny Clayton became the fourth in 2022.

Previous Winners (2005–26)

Titles	Name	Years won
7	(Netherlands) Michael van Gerwen	2013; 2016; 2017; 2018; 2019; 2022; 2023
6	(England) Phil Taylor	2005; 2006; 2007; 2008; 2010; 2012
2	(Scotland) Gary Anderson	2011; 2015
2	(England) Luke Littler	2024; 2026
1	(England) James Wade	2009
1	(Netherlands) Raymond van Barneveld	2014
1	(England) Glen Durrant	2020
1	(Wales) Jonny Clayton	2021
1	(England) Luke Humphries	2025

=== World Series of Darts ===
The World Series of Darts is a series of tournaments taking place on various continents. These tournaments are non-ranked. The field of players usually exists out of a number of eight PDC top-players participating on invitation, complemented by another eight national qualifiers. Since 2015, the players earn points over the tour to compete in the World Series of Darts Finals at the end of the year.

Previous Winners (2015–26)

Titles	Name	Years won
6	(Netherlands) Michael van Gerwen	2015; 2016; 2017; 2019; 2023; 2025
2	(Wales) Gerwyn Price	2020; 2022
1	(England) James Wade	2018
1	(Wales) Jonny Clayton	2021
1	(England) Luke Littler	2024
1	(England) Ross Smith	2026

Year	Tour Events	Finals
2013	Dubai; Sydney	—N/a
2014	Dubai; Singapore; Perth; Sydney	—N/a
2015	Dubai; Japan; Perth; Sydney; Auckland	Finals
2016	Dubai; Auckland; Shanghai; Tokyo; Sydney; Perth	Finals
2017	Dubai; Shanghai; US; Auckland; Melbourne; Perth; German	Finals
2018	German; US; Shanghai; Auckland; Melbourne; Brisbane	Finals
2019	US; German; Brisbane; Melbourne; New Zealand	Finals
2020	—N/a	Finals
2021	Nordic	Finals
2022	US; Nordic; Dutch; Queensland; New South Wales; New Zealand	Finals
2023	Bahrain; Nordic; US; Poland; New Zealand; New South Wales	Finals
2024	Bahrain; Dutch; US; Nordic; Poland; Australian; New Zealand	Finals
2025	Bahrain; Dutch; Nordic; US; Poland; Australian; New Zealand	Finals
2026	Bahrain; Saudi Arabia; Nordic; US; Australian; New Zealand	Finals

=== World Cup of Darts ===
One of three new tournaments for 2010, players from 24 countries compete for a prize fund of £150,000. The qualifiers are drawn from the PDC Order of Merit. Sky Sports screen the tournament, which rivals the WDF World Cup. England has won the tournament the most with five titles, with the pairings of Phil Taylor and Adrian Lewis, and Luke Humphries and Michael Smith. The Netherlands have won the title on four occasions, with Raymond van Barneveld being involved in all four Dutch wins. In 2019, Scotland became just the third nation to lift the trophy with a victory over the Republic of Ireland in the final, while Wales became the fourth winning nation in 2020, when they whitewashed England in the final. In 2022, Australia became the fifth and first non-European nation to win the event after beating Wales in the final, and Northern Ireland became the sixth nation to win the cup in 2025, when they too beat Wales in the final in a sudden death deciding leg.

Previous Winners (2010, 2012–2026)

Titles	Team	Players	Years won
6	England	Phil Taylor & Adrian Lewis	2012; 2013; 2015; 2016
6	England	Luke Humphries & Michael Smith	2024
6	England	Luke Littler & Luke Humphries	2026
4	Netherlands	Michael van Gerwen & Raymond van Barneveld	2014; 2017; 2018
4	Netherlands	Raymond van Barneveld & Co Stompé	2010
2	Scotland	Gary Anderson & Peter Wright	2019
2	Scotland	Peter Wright & John Henderson	2021
2	Wales	Gerwyn Price & Jonny Clayton	2020; 2023
1	Australia	Damon Heta & Simon Whitlock	2022
1	Northern Ireland	Josh Rock & Daryl Gurney	2025

=== PDC World Youth Championship ===
The second of the new tournaments for 2010 was open to all darts players, from both the BDO and PDC, aged between 18 and 21. The final was televised live on Sky Sports at Alexandra Palace before the final of the World Championship, in later years before the final of the Premier League. The two finalists will also be invited to become PDC ProTour card holders and would receive sponsorship from Rileys Dartzones, the PDC's staging partners in this event. They will also be invited to compete in the Grand Slam of Darts. In 2015 the age limit was changed to under 23.

Dimitri Van den Bergh became the first player to defend his title by beating Martin Schindler in the final 6–3 though he could not retain it for a third time due to his age.

Previous Winners (2011–25)

Titles	Name	Years won
2	(Belgium) Dimitri Van den Bergh	2017; 2018
2	(Netherlands) Gian van Veen	2024; 2025
1	(England) Arron Monk	2011
1	(England) James Hubbard	2012
1	(England) Michael Smith	2013
1	(England) Keegan Brown	2014
1	(Germany) Max Hopp	2015
1	(Australia) Corey Cadby	2016
1	(England) Luke Humphries	2019
1	(England) Bradley Brooks	2020
1	(England) Ted Evetts	2021
1	(Northern Ireland) Josh Rock	2022
1	(England) Luke Littler	2023

=== Women's World Matchplay ===
As part of their ever increasing support of the women's game, the PDC unveiled the Women's World Matchplay, a tournament for the Top 8 ladies on the PDC Women's Series Order of Merit. The tournament was played on the same day as the final of the main World Matchplay.

Previous Winners (2022–2026)

Titles	Name	Years won
3	Beau Greaves	2023; 2024; 2026
1	Fallon Sherrock	2022
1	Lisa Ashton	2025

== PDC Pro Tour ==
The PDC Pro Tour is a series of non-televised tournaments. The prize fund is £75,000 for most tournaments, which feature up to 32 boards in action simultaneously on the floor of a sports arena, hence their nickname "floor tournament". With shorter matches and the floor set up, a different kind of pressure applies compared to televised events and a different set of results can be produced. For instance, Barrie Bates was the PDC Floor Player of the Year in 2006 with Colin Lloyd and Mick McGowan also nominated – none of whom won a major during the year. The 2020 calendar will feature features 30 Players Championships and 13 European Tour events. The European Tour events are different to the Players Championships and are played on a stage in front of an often sizeable crowd.

== Past tournaments ==
=== Las Vegas Desert Classic (2002–09) ===
The Mandalay Bay Resort and Casino, Las Vegas, Nevada was the setting for the Las Vegas Desert Classic each July from 2002 to 2009. It furthered the PDC's aim to develop a world darts circuit.

Previous Winners (2002–09)

Titles	Name	Years won
5	(England) Phil Taylor	2002; 2004; 2005; 2008; 2009
1	(England) Peter Manley	2003
1	(Canada) John Part	2006
1	(Netherlands) Raymond van Barneveld	2007

=== Las Vegas Women's Desert Classic (2002–05) ===
Previous Winners (2002–05)

Titles	Name	Years won
2	(England) Trina Gulliver	2004 • 2005
1	(England) Deta Hedman	2002
1	(United States) Stacy Bromberg	2003

=== PDC Unicorn Women’s World Championship ===
The PDC Unicorn Women's World Championship was open to all female darts players from both the BDO and PDC. The 32 qualifiers played down to the last 2 in a floor tournament and the final were televised live on Sky Sports before the final of the World Matchplay. The two finalists were also invited to become PDC ProTour card holders for 2011 and 2012 and would receive sponsorship from Rileys Dartzones, the PDC's staging partners in this event. They were also invited to compete in the 2010 Grand Slam of Darts.

The first PDC Women's World Championship, in 2010, was won by Stacy Bromberg who beat Tricia Wright 6–5. The match was played after the semi-finals of the 2010 World Matchplay in Blackpool. It was first to six legs of which Bromberg was 5–3 down before making a comeback to win 6–5.

Previous Winners (2010)

Titles	Name	Years won
1	(United States) Stacy Bromberg	2010

=== World Series of Darts (2006) ===
The predecessor of what would be renamed the US Open in 2007. Phil Taylor won the event.

Previous Winners

Titles	Name	Years won
1	(England) Phil Taylor	2006

=== US Open (2007–08) ===
The US Open was a tournament introduced in 2007 to replace the World Series of Darts. The World Series ran for just one year in 2006. Phil Taylor won the US Open in 2007 and 2008. The tournament was reduced down to Players Championship status for the 2009 and 2010 editions.

Previous Winners

Titles	Name	Years won
2	(England) Phil Taylor	2007; 2008

=== Championship League Darts (2008–13) ===
Started in 2008, the Championship League Darts offered the players outside the top 8 in the PDC Order of Merit to compete for the championship. It was also the first tournament to be broadcast only by the internet.This tournament was discontinued after the 2013 edition.

Previous Winners (2008–13)

Titles	Name	Years won
4	(England) Phil Taylor	2008; 2011; 2012; 2013
1	(England) Colin Osborne	2009
1	(England) James Wade	2010

=== Champions League of Darts (2016–19) ===
A new event staged for the first time at the Motorpoint Arena Cardiff in Cardiff on 24–25 September 2016 featured the top 8 players in the PDC Order of Merit. It was the first ever PDC event to be shown live on the BBC.

Previous Winners (2016–19)

Titles	Name	Years won
1	(England) Phil Taylor	2016
1	(Austria) Mensur Suljović	2017
1	(Scotland) Gary Anderson	2018
1	(Netherlands) Michael van Gerwen	2019

=== The Masters ===
The Masters was a non-ranking darts tournament featuring the Top 24 players in the world, from the PDC Order of Merit. The first event was held between 1–3 November 2013 at the Royal Highland Centre in Edinburgh, Scotland. Since 2015 it has been held at the Marshall Arena, Milton Keynes and been the first tournament after the World Championship. It has now been replaced by the Winmau World Masters, with the last winner being Stephen Bunting

Previous Winners (2013–24)

Titles	Name	Years won
5	(Netherlands) Michael van Gerwen	2015; 2016; 2017; 2018; 2019
1	(England) Phil Taylor	2013
1	(England) James Wade	2014
1	(Scotland) Peter Wright	2020
1	(Wales) Jonny Clayton	2021
1	(England) Joe Cullen	2022
1	(England) Chris Dobey	2023
1	(England) Stephen Bunting	2024

== Other tournaments and contests ==
=== Champion versus Champion ===
There have been two head-to-head matches bringing both respective world champions together in non-affiliated contests.

Billed as the Match of the Century, Phil Taylor beat Raymond van Barneveld 21–10 at Wembley Conference Centre on 7 November 1999, to be unofficially crowned the first ever undisputed World Champion since the 1993 split in darts.

In a further head-to-head on 21 November 2004 at the Circus Tavern, via the first ever darts pay-per-view on Sky Box Office, Phil Taylor again prevailed after his opponent, the 30-stone (420 lbs/191 kg) Andy Fordham, had to retire during the match due to dehydration caused by immense heat, with Taylor leading 5-2 in sets before it was abandoned.

=== Masters of Darts ===
This event was staged twice in 2005 and 2007. In the 2005 Masters of Darts event four top players from both darts circuits together for the first major tournament confrontation since the two organisations separated.

The players were split into two groups, sharing it with only members of their affiliated organisation. Each player then vied against all players from the opposition, with one point awarded for winning a match. Following conclusion of the format, the winner of each respective group played the runner-up at the semi-final stage.

The Professional Darts Corporation pool consisted of Colin Lloyd, Wayne Mardle, Roland Scholten and Phil Taylor; whilst for the British Darts Organisation it was Tony David, Andy Fordham, Co Stompé and Raymond van Barneveld.

In a rematch of their unfinished 2004 head-to-head clash, Phil Taylor beat Andy Fordham convincingly in the final, 7–1, to be crowned the first Master of Darts. While beating Raymond van Barneveld (BDO World Champion at the time) 4–0 and 5–2 along the way, the undefeated Taylor only lost 5 sets during the entire tournament.

This event was broadcast to viewers in The Netherlands via RTL 5. Surprisingly, no British broadcaster had agreed television coverage of this unique event. The tournament was not held in 2006, however it returned in February 2007 as a Netherlands versus England encounter with five players from each country. Originally announced with a mixture of PDC and BDO players, the BDO players had all switched to the PDC by the time the event began.

=== World Darts Trophy ===
This tournament began as a BDO event. The tournament ran from 2002 to 2007. PDC players received invitations to play in the 2006 and 2007 editions of the event.

=== International Darts League ===
This tournament began as a BDO event. The tournament ran from 2003 to 2007. PDC players received invitations to play in the 2006 and 2007 editions of the event.

=== Home Tour ===
In April 2020, the PDC announced that they would be launching a new tournament starting on 17 April 2020, after most sport had been cancelled due to the COVID-19 outbreak. The home tour would see four players in action each night in a league format, before a knockout stage. The unique feature of this tournament is that player would be playing from their own homes for the first time in a darts tournament.

== PDC Hall of Fame ==
In 2005, the PDC introduced a Hall of Fame similar to other sports to recognise individuals with noteworthy contributions to darts.

The first two inductees were Eric Bristow and John Lowe, great rivals throughout the eighties and early nineties – at least one of these two players managed to reach the World Championship Final each year for the first 14 incarnations of the World Professional Darts Championship, from 1978 to 1991, with three being played against each other.

Hall of Fame inductees are now announced at the PDC Awards Dinner – which was held for the first time on 9 January 2007.

As of 2026, there have been 20 inductees.

Name	Year	Role within darts
Eric Bristow	2005	5 time World Darts Champion
John Lowe	2005	3 time World Darts Champion
Freddie Williams	2006	PDC Referee
Phil Jones	2007	PDC Master of Ceremonies
John Raby	2007	Founder of JR Darts
Sid Waddell	2008	PDC Darts and Sky Sports Commentator
Dave Lanning	2008	PDC Darts and Sky Sports Commentator
Dennis Priestley	2009	2 Time World Champion and First PDC World Champion
Dick Allix	2010	Player Manager
Tommy Cox	2010	Player Manager and PDC Tournament Director
Phil Taylor	2011	16 Time World Darts Champion
Bruce Spendley	2013	PDC Referee
John Gwynne	2014	PDC Darts and Sky Sports Commentator
John Part	2017	3 Time World Champion
Dave Clark	2018	PDC Darts and Sky Sports Presenter
Rod Harrington	2019	2 Time World Matchplay Champion
Barry Hearn	2021	PDC Chairman
Russ Bray	2024	PDC Referee
John McDonald	2026	PDC Master of Ceremonies
George Noble	2026	PDC Referee

== Roll of Honour ==
=== Premier Event Title Roll of Honour ===
43 players have won at least one PDC major singles televised event.

Rank	Name	Titles	First	Last
1	(England) Phil Taylor	79	1995 World Championship	2017 World Matchplay
2	(Netherlands) Michael van Gerwen	48	2012 World Grand Prix	2025 World Series of Darts Finals
3	(England) Luke Littler	14	2024 Premier League	2026 World Matchplay
4	(England) James Wade	11	2007 World Matchplay	2021 UK Open
5	(England) Luke Humphries	9	2023 World Grand Prix	2026 World Grand Prix
6	(Scotland) Gary Anderson	8	2011 Premier League	2018 Champions League of Darts
6	(Scotland) Peter Wright	8	2017 UK Open	2023 European Championship
6	(Wales) Gerwyn Price	8	2018 Grand Slam of Darts	2026 Grand Slam of Darts
9	(Netherlands) Raymond van Barneveld	6	2006 UK Open	2014 Premier League
10	(England) Adrian Lewis	4	2011 World Championship	2014 UK Open
10	(England) Rob Cross	4	2018 World Championship	2021 European Championship
10	(Wales) Jonny Clayton	4	2021 Masters	2021 World Series of Darts Finals
13	(Canada) John Part	3	2003 World Championship	2008 World Championship
13	(England) Ross Smith	3	2022 European Championship	2026 European Championship
15	(England) Rod Harrington	2	1998 World Matchplay	1999 World Matchplay
15	(England) Colin Lloyd	2	2004 World Grand Prix	2005 World Matchplay
15	(Scotland) Robert Thornton	2	2012 UK Open	2015 World Grand Prix
15	(Northern Ireland) Daryl Gurney	2	2017 World Grand Prix	2018 Players Championship Finals
15	(England) Nathan Aspinall	2	2019 UK Open	2023 World Matchplay
15	(Belgium) Dimitri Van den Bergh	2	2020 World Matchplay	2024 UK Open
15	(England) Michael Smith	2	2022 Grand Slam of Darts	2023 World Championship
22	(England) Dennis Priestley	1	1994 World Championship	
22	(United States) Larry Butler	1	1994 World Matchplay	
22	(England) Peter Evison	1	1996 World Matchplay	
22	(England) Alan Warriner-Little	1	2001 World Grand Prix	
22	(England) Peter Manley	1	2003 Las Vegas Desert Classic	
22	(Netherlands) Roland Scholten	1	2004 UK Open	
22	(England) Colin Osborne	1	2009 Championship League Darts	
22	(Australia) Paul Nicholson	1	2010 Players Championship Finals	
22	(England) Scott Waites	1	2010 Grand Slam of Darts	
22	(England) Kevin Painter	1	2011 Players Championship Finals	
22	(Australia) Simon Whitlock	1	2012 European Championship	
22	(Austria) Mensur Suljović	1	2017 Champions League of Darts	
22	(England) Glen Durrant	1	2020 Premier League	
22	(Portugal) José de Sousa	1	2020 Grand Slam of Darts	
22	(England) Joe Cullen	1	2022 Masters	
22	(Netherlands) Danny Noppert	1	2022 UK Open	
22	(England) Chris Dobey	1	2023 Masters	
22	(England) Andrew Gilding	1	2023 UK Open	
22	(England) Stephen Bunting	1	2024 Masters	
22	(Belgium) Mike De Decker	1	2024 World Grand Prix	
22	(England) Ritchie Edhouse	1	2024 European Championship	
22	(Netherlands) Gian van Veen	1	2025 European Championship	

Nine of these players have successfully defended a title at least once: Phil Taylor, Michael van Gerwen, Gary Anderson, Adrian Lewis, Rod Harrington, Gerwyn Price, Raymond van Barneveld, Luke Humphries and Luke Littler.

=== World Series Roll of Honour ===
17 players have won World Series of Darts events, excluding the major World Series of Darts Finals.

Rank	Name	Titles	First	Last
1	(Netherlands) Michael van Gerwen	18	2013 Dubai Darts Masters	2026 Nordic Darts Masters
2	(England) Phil Taylor	8	2013 Sydney Darts Masters	2017 Melbourne Darts Masters
3	(Scotland) Gary Anderson	6	2016 Dubai Darts Masters	2018 US Darts Masters
4	(England) Rob Cross	5	2018 Brisbane Darts Masters	2025 Dutch Darts Masters
4	(England) Luke Littler	5	2024 Bahrain Darts Masters	2026 Saudi Arabia Darts Masters
6	(Scotland) Peter Wright	4	2017 German Darts Masters	2023 Nordic Darts Masters
6	(Wales) Gerwyn Price	4	2022 New Zealand Darts Masters	2025 Poland Darts Masters
8	(England) Michael Smith	3	2018 Shanghai Darts Masters	2023 Bahrain Darts Masters
8	(England) Luke Humphries	3	2024 New Zealand Darts Masters	2026 US Darts Masters
10	(Belgium) Dimitri Van den Bergh	2	2022 Nordic Darts Masters	2022 Dutch Darts Masters
10	(Wales) Jonny Clayton	2	2022 New South Wales Darts Masters	2026 New Zealand Darts Masters
10	(England) Stephen Bunting	2	2025 Bahrain Darts Masters	2025 Nordic Darts Masters
13	(England) Adrian Lewis	1	2015 Auckland Darts Masters	
13	(Australia) Kyle Anderson	1	2017 Auckland Darts Masters	
13	(Austria) Mensur Suljović	1	2018 German Darts Masters	
13	(England) Nathan Aspinall	1	2019 US Darts Masters	
13	(Australia) Damon Heta	1	2019 Brisbane Darts Masters	
13	(England) James Wade	1	2026 Australian Darts Masters	

=== European Tour Roll of Honour ===
44 players have won at least one European Tour event.

Rank	Name	Titles	First	Last
1	(Netherlands) Michael van Gerwen	38	2013 European Darts Open	2025 German Darts Grand Prix
2	(Wales) Gerwyn Price	10	2018 International Darts Open	2026 European Darts Grand Prix
3	(Scotland) Peter Wright	9	2014 European Darts Open	2024 German Darts Championship
4	(England) Dave Chisnall	8	2013 German Darts Championship	2024 Flanders Darts Trophy
4	(England) Luke Humphries	8	2022 German Darts Grand Prix	2025 Czech Darts Open
6	(England) Michael Smith	6	2014 European Darts Trophy	2023 German Darts Grand Prix
6	(England) Luke Littler	6	2024 Belgian Darts Open	2026 Czech Darts Open
8	(England) Phil Taylor	4	2012 German Darts Championship	2016 Austrian Darts Open
8	(Wales) Jonny Clayton	4	2018 Austrian Darts Open	2026 Swiss Darts Trophy
8	(England) Nathan Aspinall	4	2025 European Darts Trophy	2026 German Darts Grand Prix
10	(Scotland) Gary Anderson	3	2014 German Darts Championship	2025 European Darts Grand Prix
10	(England) James Wade	3	2014 Gibraltar Darts Trophy	2026 Flanders Darts Trophy
10	(Austria) Mensur Suljović	3	2016 International Darts Open	2019 Austrian Darts Championship
10	(England) Ian White	3	2018 Dutch Darts Championship	2019 Dutch Darts Masters
10	(England) Joe Cullen	3	2019 European Darts Matchplay	2022 Hungarian Darts Trophy
10	(Poland) Krzysztof Ratajski	3	2019 Gibraltar Darts Trophy	2026 European Darts Open
10	(Germany) Martin Schindler	3	2024 International Darts Open	2025 Austrian Darts Open
17	(Belgium) Kim Huybrechts	2	2013 Dutch Darts Masters	2015 European Darts Grand Prix
17	(England) Rob Cross	2	2023 European Darts Grand Prix	2024 Baltic Sea Darts Open
17	(Northern Ireland) Josh Rock	2	2024 Dutch Darts Championship	2026 Austrian Darts Open
17	(England) Stephen Bunting	2	2025 International Darts Open	2025 Swiss Darts Trophy
17	(Netherlands) Wessel Nijman	2	2026 European Darts Trophy	2026 Slovak Darts Open
17	(England) Ross Smith	2	2026 International Darts Open	2026 Hungarian Darts Trophy
24	(England) Justin Pipe	1	2012 Austrian Darts Open	
24	(Netherlands) Raymond van Barneveld	1	2012 European Darts Open	
24	(England) Adrian Lewis	1	2012 German Darts Masters	
24	(Australia) Simon Whitlock	1	2012 Dutch Darts Masters	
24	(Canada) John Part	1	2013 UK Masters	
24	(Wales) Wes Newton	1	2013 European Darts Trophy	
24	(England) Steve Beaton	1	2013 German Darts Masters	
24	(Netherlands) Vincent van der Voort	1	2014 Austrian Darts Open	
24	(England) Mervyn King	1	2014 European Darts Grand Prix	
24	(Scotland) Robert Thornton	1	2015 European Darts Open	
24	(England) Alan Norris	1	2016 German Darts Championship	
24	(Germany) Max Hopp	1	2018 German Darts Open	
24	(Northern Ireland) Daryl Gurney	1	2019 German Darts Championship	
24	(England) Jamie Hughes	1	2019 Czech Darts Open	
24	(South Africa) Devon Petersen	1	2020 German Darts Championship	
24	(Portugal) José de Sousa	1	2020 European Darts Grand Prix	
24	(Australia) Damon Heta	1	2022 Gibraltar Darts Trophy	
24	(Germany) Ricardo Pietreczko	1	2023 German Darts Championship	
24	(Germany) Niko Springer	1	2025 Hungarian Darts Trophy	
24	(England) Luke Woodhouse	1	2026 Baltic Sea Darts Open	
24	(Netherlands) Niels Zonneveld	1	2026 Dutch Darts Championship	

== Records and statistics ==
=== Major events ===
Statistics correct through the end of the 2024 Premier League.

Most PDC Major Titles: 79 – (England) Phil Taylor (1995–2017)

Most PDC Major Titles in a Single Year: 9 - (Netherlands) Michael van Gerwen (2016) (Note: The Masters, UK Open, Premier League Darts, World Matchplay, World Grand Prix, European Championship, The World Series of Darts Finals, Grand Slam of Darts and Players Championship Finals.)

Holding most PDC Major Titles at a time: 10 - (Netherlands) Michael van Gerwen (Held all major titles from 2 January 2017 to 4 March 2017) (Note: The Masters, UK Open, Premier League Darts, World Matchplay, World Grand Prix, European Championship, The World Series of Darts Finals, Grand Slam of Darts, Players Championship Finals and the World Championship.)

Highest Percentage of Major Titles won in a year: 100% - (England) Phil Taylor (1995 (2), 1997 (2), 2000 (3) and 2002 (4))

Most Years with at least 1 Major Title: 22 - (England) Phil Taylor (1995–2014, 2016–2017)

Most Consecutive Years with at least 1 Major Title: 20 - (England) Phil Taylor (1995–2014)

Most Titles at a Single Major: 16 - (England) Phil Taylor (World Matchplay (1995, 1997, 2000–2004, 2006, 2008–2014, 2017))

Most Consecutive Titles at a Single Major: 8 - (England) Phil Taylor (World Championship (1995–2002))

Youngest Winner of a PDC Major Title: 17 years and 123 days - (England) Luke Littler (2024 Premier League)

Oldest Winner of a PDC Major Title: 56 years and 351 days - (England) Phil Taylor (2017 World Matchplay)

Most 9-dart Finishes in PDC Majors: 9 - (England) Phil Taylor (2002–2014)

Most Different Major Winners in a Year: 7 (2022) (Note: Peter Wright (World Championship), Joe Cullen (The Masters), Danny Noppert (UK Open), Michael van Gerwen (Premier League Darts, World Matchplay, World Grand Prix and Players Championship Finals), Ross Smith (European Championship), Gerwyn Price (The World Series of Darts Finals), Michael Smith (Grand Slam of Darts).)

== See also ==
- British Darts Organisation
- World Darts Federation
- List of darts players
- Nine-dart finish
