= List of PDC premier event champions =

List of champions of major individual PDC darts tournaments

The Professional Darts Corporation (PDC) organises a number of prominent televised darts tournaments. Under the PDC's 2026 rules, its premier events include both tournaments that contribute to the PDC Order of Merit and invitation-only competitions such as the Premier League.

This article lists the winners of selected individual PDC premier tournaments since 1994, including discontinued competitions, and summarises their title records. The World Cup of Darts is excluded from the counts because it is a team competition. Likewise, individual ProTour and international World Series of Darts events are not counted; the separate World Series of Darts Finals is included. Results are drawn from historical tournament winners' lists.

== Scope and counting method ==
The following tables count one title for each championship won in the selected events. They cover the eight tournaments classified by the PDC in 2026 as Premier Ranked Events, plus the individual Premier Invitational Events and four discontinued event groupings. These historical statistics are a defined selection of event titles rather than an official PDC ranking calculation, and the ranking status of some tournaments has changed over time. The World Championship, World Matchplay and Premier League are also commonly described as the Triple Crown, although the PDC does not officially designate these events as a separate category.

The Players Championship Finals was held twice in 2011, in February and December. The Masters, renamed the World Masters in 2025, is treated as a continuous tournament; its earlier editions and those of the Grand Slam of Darts remain in the same columns despite changes in ranking status. The 2006 World Series of Darts and the 2007–2008 US Open editions are grouped as successive competitions; the US Open editions from 2009 and 2010 are excluded because they formed part of the ProTour. The separate Masters of Darts competition, held in 2005 and 2007, is not included in these totals.

As of 25 October 2026, following the European Championship, the list covers 244 titles won by 43 players. The 2026 Grand Slam of Darts and 2026 Players Championship Finals had not yet taken place.

== Champions by year ==
Each winner is shown by flag and surname. The number in parentheses links to the specific tournament edition and gives the sequence of the player's titles within this selection, followed by that player's total as of 25 October 2026—for example, (3/14) denotes the third of 14 titles. A bold, linked surname marks the player's first title in the list.

The pale yellow and green backgrounds distinguish the World Championship and World Matchplay, respectively. Other current ranked events are light grey, current invitational events lavender, and discontinued competitions pale peach. A tournament retains the same background colour throughout this list, even if its ranking status later changed. Blank grey cells indicate years outside an event's existence, while exceptional unplayed or future editions are labelled separately.

Table key
World Championship
World Matchplay
Other current ranked premier events
Current invitational premier events
Discontinued premier events
Tournament did not exist or was no longer held (merged blank cells)
Bold linked surname indicates the player's first title in the selected competitions; the smaller linked number gives the title's ordinal position and the player's total titles in the list.

PDC premier individual event champions (1994–2026)
Year	Current ranked premier events								Current invitational premier events		Discontinued events				Year
Year	World Championship	World Matchplay	World Grand Prix	UK Open	Grand Slam of Darts (Note: The Grand Slam of Darts was a non-ranking invitation event from 2007 through 2014, and became a ranking event in 2015.)	European Championship	Players Championship Finals (Note: The Players Championship Finals was held twice in 2011, with separate editions in February and December.)	Masters / World Masters (Note: The Masters began in 2013 as a non-ranking event. In 2025 it was rebranded as the World Masters and became a ranking tournament.)	Premier League	World Series of Darts Finals	Las Vegas Desert Classic	World Series of Darts / US Open (Note: The 2006 World Series of Darts was followed by the US Open in 2007. Only the 2007 and 2008 US Open editions are counted; the 2009 and 2010 editions were ProTour events.)	Championship League Darts	Champions League of Darts	Year
1994	(England) Priestley (1/1)	(United States) Butler (1/1)													1994
1995	(England) Taylor (1/79)	(England) Taylor (2/79)													1995
1996	(England) Taylor (3/79)	(England) Evison (1/1)													1996
1997	(England) Taylor (4/79)	(England) Taylor (5/79)													1997
1998	(England) Taylor (6/79)	(England) Harrington (1/2)	(England) Taylor (7/79)												1998
1999	(England) Taylor (8/79)	(England) Harrington (2/2)	(England) Taylor (9/79)												1999
2000	(England) Taylor (10/79)	(England) Taylor (11/79)	(England) Taylor (12/79)												2000
2001	(England) Taylor (13/79)	(England) Taylor (14/79)	(England) Warriner-Little (1/1)												2001
2002	(England) Taylor (15/79)	(England) Taylor (17/79)	(England) Taylor (18/79)								(England) Taylor (16/79)				2002
2003	(Canada) Part (1/3)	(England) Taylor (20/79)	(England) Taylor (21/79)	(England) Taylor (19/79)							(England) Manley (1/1)				2003
2004	(England) Taylor (22/79)	(England) Taylor (24/79)	(England) Lloyd (1/2)	(Netherlands) Scholten (1/1)							(England) Taylor (23/79)				2004
2005	(England) Taylor (25/79)	(England) Lloyd (2/2)	(England) Taylor (29/79)	(England) Taylor (27/79)					(England) Taylor (26/79)		(England) Taylor (28/79)				2005
2006	(England) Taylor (30/79)	(England) Taylor (33/79)	(England) Taylor (34/79)	(Netherlands) van Barneveld (1/6)					(England) Taylor (32/79)		(Canada) Part (2/3)	(England) Taylor (31/79)			2006
2007	(Netherlands) van Barneveld (2/6)	(England) Wade (1/11)	(England) Wade (2/11)	(Netherlands) van Barneveld (3/6)	(England) Taylor (37/79)				(England) Taylor (36/79)		(Netherlands) van Barneveld (4/6)	(England) Taylor (35/79)			2007
2008	(Canada) Part (3/3)	(England) Taylor (41/79)	(England) Taylor (42/79)	(England) Wade (3/11)	(England) Taylor (45/79)	(England) Taylor (44/79)			(England) Taylor (39/79)		(England) Taylor (40/79)	(England) Taylor (38/79)	(England) Taylor (43/79)		2008
2009	(England) Taylor (46/79)	(England) Taylor (50/79)	(England) Taylor (51/79)	(England) Taylor (48/79)	(England) Taylor (53/79)	(England) Taylor (52/79)	(England) Taylor (47/79)		(England) Wade (4/11)		(England) Taylor (49/79)		(England) Osborne (1/1)		2009
2010	(England) Taylor (54/79)	(England) Taylor (57/79)	(England) Wade (5/11)	(England) Taylor (56/79)	(England) Waites (1/1)	(England) Taylor (58/79)	(Australia) Nicholson (1/1)		(England) Taylor (55/79)				(England) Wade (6/11)		2010
2011	(England) Lewis (1/4)	(England) Taylor (60/79)	(England) Taylor (62/79)	(England) Wade (7/11)	(England) Taylor (64/79)	(England) Taylor (61/79)	(England) Taylor (59/79) (England) Painter (1/1)		(Scotland) Anderson (1/8)				(England) Taylor (63/79)		2011
2012	(England) Lewis (2/4)	(England) Taylor (66/79)	(Netherlands) van Gerwen (1/48)	(Scotland) Thornton (1/2)	(Netherlands) van Barneveld (5/6)	(Australia) Whitlock (1/1)	(England) Taylor (68/79)		(England) Taylor (65/79)				(England) Taylor (67/79)		2012
2013	(England) Taylor (69/79)	(England) Taylor (71/79)	(England) Taylor (72/79)	(England) Taylor (70/79)	(England) Taylor (75/79)	(England) Lewis (3/4)	(Netherlands) van Gerwen (3/48)	(England) Taylor (74/79)	(Netherlands) van Gerwen (2/48)				(England) Taylor (73/79)		2013
2014	(Netherlands) van Gerwen (4/48)	(England) Taylor (76/79)	(Netherlands) van Gerwen (5/48)	(England) Lewis (4/4)	(England) Taylor (77/79)	(Netherlands) van Gerwen (6/48)	(Scotland) Anderson (2/8)	(England) Wade (8/11)	(Netherlands) van Barneveld (6/6)						2014
2015	(Scotland) Anderson (3/8)	(Netherlands) van Gerwen (9/48)	(Scotland) Thornton (2/2)	(Netherlands) van Gerwen (8/48)	(Netherlands) van Gerwen (11/48)	(Netherlands) van Gerwen (10/48)	(Netherlands) van Gerwen (13/48)	(Netherlands) van Gerwen (7/48)	(Scotland) Anderson (4/8)	(Netherlands) van Gerwen (12/48)					2015
2016	(Scotland) Anderson (5/8)	(Netherlands) van Gerwen (17/48)	(Netherlands) van Gerwen (18/48)	(Netherlands) van Gerwen (15/48)	(Netherlands) van Gerwen (21/48)	(Netherlands) van Gerwen (19/48)	(Netherlands) van Gerwen (22/48)	(Netherlands) van Gerwen (14/48)	(Netherlands) van Gerwen (16/48)	(Netherlands) van Gerwen (20/48)				(England) Taylor (78/79)	2016
2017	(Netherlands) van Gerwen (23/48)	(England) Taylor (79/79)	(Northern Ireland) Gurney (1/2)	(Scotland) Wright (1/8)	(Netherlands) van Gerwen (28/48)	(Netherlands) van Gerwen (26/48)	(Netherlands) van Gerwen (29/48)	(Netherlands) van Gerwen (24/48)	(Netherlands) van Gerwen (25/48)	(Netherlands) van Gerwen (27/48)				(Austria) Suljović (1/1)	2017
2018	(England) Cross (1/4)	(Scotland) Anderson (7/8)	(Netherlands) van Gerwen (32/48)	(Scotland) Anderson (6/8)	(Wales) Price (1/7)	(England) Wade (9/11)	(Northern Ireland) Gurney (2/2)	(Netherlands) van Gerwen (30/48)	(Netherlands) van Gerwen (31/48)	(England) Wade (10/11)				(Scotland) Anderson (8/8)	2018
2019	(Netherlands) van Gerwen (33/48)	(England) Cross (2/4)	(Netherlands) van Gerwen (36/48)	(England) Aspinall (1/2)	(Wales) Price (2/7)	(England) Cross (3/4)	(Netherlands) van Gerwen (39/48)	(Netherlands) van Gerwen (34/48)	(Netherlands) van Gerwen (35/48)	(Netherlands) van Gerwen (38/48)				(Netherlands) van Gerwen (37/48)	2019
2020	(Scotland) Wright (2/8)	(Belgium) Van den Bergh (1/2)	(Wales) Price (4/7)	(Netherlands) van Gerwen (40/48)	(Portugal) de Sousa (1/1)	(Scotland) Wright (4/8)	(Netherlands) van Gerwen (41/48)	(Scotland) Wright (3/8)	(England) Durrant (1/1)	(Wales) Price (3/7)					2020
2021	(Wales) Price (5/7)	(Scotland) Wright (5/8)	(Wales) Clayton (3/4)	(England) Wade (11/11)	(Wales) Price (6/7)	(England) Cross (4/4)	(Scotland) Wright (6/8)	(Wales) Clayton (1/4)	(Wales) Clayton (2/4)	(Wales) Clayton (4/4)					2021
2022	(Scotland) Wright (7/8)	(Netherlands) van Gerwen (43/48)	(Netherlands) van Gerwen (44/48)	(Netherlands) Noppert (1/1)	(England) M Smith (1/2)	(England) R Smith (1/3)	(Netherlands) van Gerwen (45/48)	(England) Cullen (1/1)	(Netherlands) van Gerwen (42/48)	(Wales) Price (7/7)					2022
2023	(England) M Smith (2/2)	(England) Aspinall (2/2)	(England) Humphries (1/9)	(England) Gilding (1/1)	(England) Humphries (2/9)	(Scotland) Wright (8/8)	(England) Humphries (3/9)	(England) Dobey (1/1)	(Netherlands) van Gerwen (46/48)	(Netherlands) van Gerwen (47/48)					2023
2024	(England) Humphries (4/9)	(England) Humphries (5/9)	(Belgium) De Decker (1/1)	(Belgium) Van den Bergh (2/2)	(England) Littler (3/14)	(England) Edhouse (1/1)	(England) Humphries (6/9)	(England) Bunting (1/1)	(England) Littler (1/14)	(England) Littler (2/14)					2024
2025	(England) Littler (4/14)	(England) Littler (6/14)	(England) Littler (7/14)	(England) Littler (5/14)	(England) Littler (8/14)	(Netherlands) van Veen (1/1)	(England) Littler (9/14)	(England) Humphries (7/9)	(England) Humphries (8/9)	(Netherlands) van Gerwen (48/48)					2025
2026	(England) Littler (10/14)	(England) Littler (14/14)	(England) Humphries (9/9)	(England) Littler (12/14)	Not yet held	(England) R Smith (3/3)	Not yet held	(England) Littler (11/14)	(England) Littler (13/14)	(England) R Smith (2/3)					2026
Year	World Championship	World Matchplay	World Grand Prix	UK Open	Grand Slam	European Championship	Players Championship Finals	Masters / World Masters	Premier League	World Series Finals	Las Vegas Desert Classic	World Series / US Open	Championship League	Champions League	Year

== Champions list ==
The table lists all players who have won at least one of the selected individual PDC premier events. Each tournament has its own column, with titles calculated from the year-by-year results above. Bold, underlined numbers indicate the most titles won at that event, including ties. The years shown are the first and last winning editions, not the span of a player's professional career. Players with an equal total are listed by the date of their first title, earliest first. Statistics are correct as of 25 October 2026.

Tournament abbreviations
WC	World Championship	MAS	Masters / World Masters
WM	World Matchplay	PL	Premier League
WGP	World Grand Prix	WSF	World Series of Darts Finals
UK	UK Open	LV	Las Vegas Desert Classic
GS	Grand Slam of Darts	WS/US	World Series of Darts / US Open
EC	European Championship	CHL	Championship League Darts
PCF	Players Championship Finals	CLD	Champions League of Darts

Titles	Player	WC	WM	WGP	UK	GS	EC	PCF	MAS	PL	WSF	LV	WS/US	CHL	CLD	Years
79	(England) Phil Taylor	14	16	11	5	6	4	3	1	6		5	3	4	1	1995–2017
48	(Netherlands) Michael van Gerwen	3	3	6	3	3	4	7	5	7	6				1	2012–2025
14	(England) Luke Littler	2	2	1	2	2		1	1	2	1					2024–2026
11	(England) James Wade		1	2	3		1		1	1	1			1		2007–2021
9	(England) Luke Humphries	1	1	2		1		2	1	1						2023–2026
8	(Scotland) Gary Anderson	2	1		1			1		2					1	2011–2018
8	(Scotland) Peter Wright	2	1		1		2	1	1							2017–2023
7	(Wales) Gerwyn Price	1		1		3					2					2018–2022
6	(Netherlands) Raymond van Barneveld	1			2	1				1		1				2006–2014
4	(England) Adrian Lewis	2			1		1									2011–2014
4	(England) Rob Cross	1	1				2									2018–2021
4	(Wales) Jonny Clayton			1					1	1	1					2021
3	(Canada) John Part	2										1				2003–2008
3	(England) Ross Smith						2				1					2022–2026
2	(England) Rod Harrington		2													1998–1999
2	(England) Colin Lloyd		1	1												2004–2005
2	(Scotland) Robert Thornton			1	1											2012–2015
2	(Northern Ireland) Daryl Gurney			1				1								2017–2018
2	(England) Nathan Aspinall		1		1											2019–2023
2	(Belgium) Dimitri Van den Bergh		1		1											2020–2024
2	(England) Michael Smith	1				1										2022–2023
1	(England) Dennis Priestley	1														1994
1	(United States) Larry Butler		1													1994
1	(England) Peter Evison		1													1996
1	(England) Alan Warriner-Little			1												2001
1	(England) Peter Manley											1				2003
1	(Netherlands) Roland Scholten				1											2004
1	(England) Colin Osborne													1		2009
1	(Australia) Paul Nicholson							1								2010
1	(England) Scott Waites					1										2010
1	(England) Kevin Painter							1								2011
1	(Australia) Simon Whitlock						1									2012
1	(Austria) Mensur Suljović														1	2017
1	(England) Glen Durrant									1						2020
1	(Portugal) José de Sousa					1										2020
1	(England) Joe Cullen								1							2022
1	(Netherlands) Danny Noppert				1											2022
1	(England) Chris Dobey								1							2023
1	(England) Andrew Gilding				1											2023
1	(England) Stephen Bunting								1							2024
1	(Belgium) Mike De Decker			1												2024
1	(England) Ritchie Edhouse						1									2024
1	(Netherlands) Gian van Veen						1									2025
Total	43 players	244 titles across 14 included events														1994–2026

== Records and statistics ==
Statistics are correct as of 25 October 2026, following the 2026 European Championship, unless otherwise noted.

The following summary tables are derived from the same 244 completed titles recorded above. They are descriptive statistics for this defined group of individual events, rather than a PDC ranking. Where totals are tied in ranked lists, entries are presented by the earliest relevant title or beginning of the streak. Chronological and tournament-grouped tables retain their own ordering.

=== Most titles at each tournament ===
Records below are for the editions included in this article. A shared record is listed for each tied player; a year range refers to a player's first and last titles at the event.

Tournament	Most titles	Player(s)	Winning years
World Championship	14	(England) Phil Taylor	1995–2013
World Matchplay	16	(England) Phil Taylor	1995–2017
World Grand Prix	11	(England) Phil Taylor	1998–2013
UK Open	5	(England) Phil Taylor	2003–2013
Grand Slam of Darts	6	(England) Phil Taylor	2007–2014
European Championship	4	(England) Phil Taylor	2008–2011
European Championship	4	(Netherlands) Michael van Gerwen	2014–2017
Players Championship Finals	7	(Netherlands) Michael van Gerwen	2013–2022
Masters / World Masters	5	(Netherlands) Michael van Gerwen	2015–2019
Premier League	7	(Netherlands) Michael van Gerwen	2013–2023
World Series of Darts Finals	6	(Netherlands) Michael van Gerwen	2015–2025
Las Vegas Desert Classic	5	(England) Phil Taylor	2002–2009
World Series of Darts / US Open	3	(England) Phil Taylor	2006–2008
Championship League Darts	4	(England) Phil Taylor	2008–2013
Champions League of Darts	1	(England) Phil Taylor	2016
Champions League of Darts	1	(Austria) Mensur Suljović	2017
Champions League of Darts	1	(Scotland) Gary Anderson	2018
Champions League of Darts	1	(Netherlands) Michael van Gerwen	2019

=== Consecutive premier titles across events ===
The table lists runs of at least three consecutive titles across all 14 individual premier event categories included in this article, in the chronological order of tournament finals. Wins at different tournaments can form one run; any title won by another player ends the sequence. The World Cup, individual World Series events and ProTour events are excluded. The first and last titles of each streak are linked to their respective tournament editions; the full sequence is also shown in chronological order. Each abbreviated tournament name links to its corresponding edition. The results include the corrected order of the November 2015 Grand Slam of Darts (15 November) and World Series of Darts Finals (22 November).

This definition differs from some published major-title streak totals. For example, James Wade won the 2008 UK Open in June 2008, interrupting Phil Taylor's run after the Premier League, while Taylor's 2008 Championship League Darts victory in October counts in this article's selection.

Titles in succession	Player	First title	Last title	Winning events (in order)
8	(England) Phil Taylor	LV 2008	PCF 2009	LV 2008 · WM 2008 · WGP 2008 · CHL 2008 · EC 2008 · GS 2008 · WC 2009 · PCF 2009
7	(Netherlands) Michael van Gerwen	WGP 2016	MAS 2017	WGP 2016 · EC 2016 · WSF 2016 · GS 2016 · PCF 2016 · WC 2017 · MAS 2017
7	(England) Luke Littler	GS 2025	WM 2026	GS 2025 · PCF 2025 · WC 2026 · MAS 2026 · UK 2026 · PL 2026 · WM 2026
6	(England) Phil Taylor	WGP 1999	WM 2001	WGP 1999 · WC 2000 · WM 2000 · WGP 2000 · WC 2001 · WM 2001
5	(England) Phil Taylor	WM 2011	GS 2011	WM 2011 · EC 2011 · WGP 2011 · CHL 2011 · GS 2011
5	(England) Phil Taylor	WM 2013	GS 2013	WM 2013 · WGP 2013 · CHL 2013 · MAS 2013 · GS 2013
4	(England) Phil Taylor	WC 2002	WGP 2002	WC 2002 · LV 2002 · WM 2002 · WGP 2002
4	(England) Phil Taylor	WC 2005	LV 2005	WC 2005 · PL 2005 · UK 2005 · LV 2005
4	(England) Phil Taylor	WGP 2005	PL 2006	WGP 2005 · WC 2006 · WS/US 2006 · PL 2006
4	(England) Phil Taylor	UK 2009	WGP 2009	UK 2009 · LV 2009 · WM 2009 · WGP 2009
4	(England) Phil Taylor	PL 2010	EC 2010	PL 2010 · UK 2010 · WM 2010 · EC 2010
4	(Netherlands) Michael van Gerwen	EC 2015	PCF 2015	EC 2015 · GS 2015 · WSF 2015 · PCF 2015
4	(Netherlands) Michael van Gerwen	MAS 2016	WM 2016	MAS 2016 · UK 2016 · PL 2016 · WM 2016
4	(Netherlands) Michael van Gerwen	EC 2017	PCF 2017	EC 2017 · WSF 2017 · GS 2017 · PCF 2017
3	(England) Phil Taylor	WC 1995	WC 1996	WC 1995 · WM 1995 · WC 1996
3	(England) Phil Taylor	WC 1997	WC 1998	WC 1997 · WM 1997 · WC 1998
3	(England) Phil Taylor	WM 2003	WC 2004	WM 2003 · WGP 2003 · WC 2004
3	(England) Phil Taylor	EC 2009	WC 2010	EC 2009 · GS 2009 · WC 2010
3	(England) Luke Humphries	GS 2023	WC 2024	GS 2023 · PCF 2023 · WC 2024

=== Consecutive titles at the same tournament ===
Streaks of three or more consecutive winning editions at one tournament. Consecutive means successive held editions, rather than necessarily successive calendar years. Only completed editions through 25 October 2026 are counted.

Titles in succession	Player	Tournament	From	To
8	(England) Phil Taylor	World Championship	1995	2002
7	(England) Phil Taylor	World Matchplay	2008	2014
5	(England) Phil Taylor	World Matchplay	2000	2004
5	(Netherlands) Michael van Gerwen	Masters / World Masters	2015	2019
4	(England) Phil Taylor	Premier League	2005	2008
4	(England) Phil Taylor	European Championship	2008	2011
4	(Netherlands) Michael van Gerwen	European Championship	2014	2017
4	(Netherlands) Michael van Gerwen	Premier League	2016	2019
3	(England) Phil Taylor	World Grand Prix	1998	2000
3	(England) Phil Taylor	World Championship	2004	2006
3	(England) Phil Taylor	World Series of Darts / US Open	2006	2008
3	(England) Phil Taylor	Grand Slam of Darts	2007	2009
3	(England) Phil Taylor	Championship League Darts	2011	2013
3	(Netherlands) Michael van Gerwen	Grand Slam of Darts	2015	2017
3	(Netherlands) Michael van Gerwen	Players Championship Finals	2015	2017
3	(Netherlands) Michael van Gerwen	World Series of Darts Finals	2015	2017

=== Most premier titles in a year ===
Player–season combinations with at least four wins across the included events. These are based on the year assigned to the tournament edition, not solely on the date of the final.

Titles	Player	Year	Tournaments
9	(Netherlands) Michael van Gerwen	2016	WM, WGP, UK, GS, EC, PCF, MAS, PL, WSF
8	(England) Phil Taylor	2008	WM, WGP, GS, EC, PL, LV, US, CHL
8	(England) Phil Taylor	2009	WC, WM, WGP, UK, GS, EC, PCF, LV
7	(England) Phil Taylor	2013	WC, WM, WGP, UK, GS, MAS, CHL
7	(Netherlands) Michael van Gerwen	2015	WM, UK, GS, EC, PCF, MAS, WSF
7	(Netherlands) Michael van Gerwen	2017	WC, GS, EC, PCF, MAS, PL, WSF
7	(Netherlands) Michael van Gerwen	2019	WC, WGP, PCF, MAS, PL, WSF, CL
6	(England) Phil Taylor	2011	WM, WGP, GS, EC, PCF, CHL
6	(England) Luke Littler	2025	WC, WM, WGP, UK, GS, PCF
5	(England) Phil Taylor	2005	WC, WGP, UK, PL, LV
5	(England) Phil Taylor	2006	WC, WM, WGP, PL, US
5	(England) Phil Taylor	2010	WC, WM, UK, EC, PL
5	(England) Luke Littler	2026	WC, WM, UK, MAS, PL
4	(England) Phil Taylor	2002	WC, WM, WGP, LV
4	(England) Phil Taylor	2012	WM, PCF, PL, CHL
4	(Wales) Jonny Clayton	2021	WGP, MAS, PL, WSF
4	(Netherlands) Michael van Gerwen	2022	WM, WGP, PCF, PL

=== Titles by decade ===
Counts for each decade reflect the tournament editions included in this article. The 1990s begin in 1994, and the 2020s cover completed editions only through 25 October 2026; neither period represents a complete decade.

Decade	Titles awarded	Most successful player(s)	Titles won
1990s	14	(England) Phil Taylor	9
2000s	61	(England) Phil Taylor	44
2010s	101	(Netherlands) Michael van Gerwen	39
2020s	68	(England) Luke Littler	14

=== Titles by country ===
The breakdown uses the national representation shown next to each winner in this list. England, Scotland and Wales are counted separately, as in international darts; this is not a country-of-birth analysis.

Country / representation	Titles	Players with titles
England	145	24
Netherlands	57	5
Scotland	18	3
Wales	11	2
Canada	3	1
Belgium	3	2
Australia	2	2
Northern Ireland	2	1
United States	1	1
Austria	1	1
Portugal	1	1
Total	244	43

=== Most different premier events won ===
The number of distinct tournament columns in which a player has won at least one title. Masters/World Masters is one column, as is the historical World Series of Darts/US Open grouping.

Different events	Player	Total titles
13	(England) Phil Taylor	79
11	(Netherlands) Michael van Gerwen	48
9	(England) Luke Littler	14
8	(England) James Wade	11
7	(England) Luke Humphries	9
6	(Scotland) Gary Anderson	8
6	(Scotland) Peter Wright	8
5	(Netherlands) Raymond van Barneveld	6

=== Titles by tournament ===
The number of titles awarded in the selected competitions, including two Players Championship Finals editions in 2011. The first and last years refer to the editions included in this list, not necessarily the lifetime of a brand or sponsor.

Tournament	First listed year	Last listed year	Titles	Different champions
World Championship	1994	2026	33	13
World Matchplay	1994	2026	33	14
World Grand Prix	1998	2026	29	12
UK Open	2003	2026	24	14
Premier League	2005	2026	22	9
Grand Slam of Darts	2007	2025	19	9
European Championship	2008	2026	19	10
Players Championship Finals	2009	2025	18	9
Masters / World Masters	2013	2026	14	10
World Series of Darts Finals	2015	2026	12	6
Las Vegas Desert Classic	2002	2009	8	4
Championship League Darts	2008	2013	6	3
Champions League of Darts	2016	2019	4	4
World Series of Darts / US Open	2006	2008	3	1

Total selected individual titles	244

== Champions in order of first title ==
The table lists the 43 players who have won at least one of the 14 individual PDC premier event categories covered in this article, ordered by the year of their first title. Each year links to the corresponding tournament edition; a blank cell indicates that the player has not won that event. As of 25 October 2026, the total of 244 titles excludes the team World Cup of Darts, individual World Series of Darts events and ProTour events.

The Masters and World Masters are counted together. The historical 2006 World Series of Darts and the 2007–2008 US Open are grouped in one column. The two editions of the Players Championship Finals in 2011 are identified separately.

Tournament abbreviations
WC	World Championship	MAS	Masters / World Masters
WM	World Matchplay	PL	Premier League
WGP	World Grand Prix	WSF	World Series of Darts Finals
UK	UK Open	LV	Las Vegas Desert Classic
GS	Grand Slam of Darts	WS/US	World Series of Darts (2006) / US Open (2007–2008)
EC	European Championship	CHL	Championship League Darts
PCF	Players Championship Finals	CLD	Champions League of Darts

Chronological list of individual PDC premier event champions (1994–2026)
No.	Champion	First year	First title	Titles	WC	WM	WGP	UK	GS	EC	PCF	MAS	PL	WSF	LV	WS/US	CHL	CLD
1	(England) Dennis Priestley	1994	WC 1994	1	1994													
2	(United States) Larry Butler	1994	WM 1994	1		1994												
3	(England) Phil Taylor	1995	WC 1995	79	1995; 1996; 1997; 1998; 1999; 2000; 2001; 2002; 2004; 2005; 2006; 2009; 2010; 2013	1995; 1997; 2000; 2001; 2002; 2003; 2004; 2006; 2008; 2009; 2010; 2011; 2012; 2013; 2014; 2017	1998; 1999; 2000; 2002; 2003; 2005; 2006; 2008; 2009; 2011; 2013	2003; 2005; 2009; 2010; 2013	2007; 2008; 2009; 2011; 2013; 2014	2008; 2009; 2010; 2011	2009; 2011 (Feb); 2012	2013	2005; 2006; 2007; 2008; 2010; 2012		2002; 2004; 2005; 2008; 2009	2006; 2007; 2008	2008; 2011; 2012; 2013	2016
4	(England) Peter Evison	1996	WM 1996	1		1996												
5	(England) Rod Harrington	1998	WM 1998	2		1998; 1999												
6	(England) Alan Warriner-Little	2001	WGP 2001	1			2001											
7	(Canada) John Part	2003	WC 2003	3	2003; 2008										2006			
8	(England) Peter Manley	2003	LV 2003	1											2003			
9	(Netherlands) Roland Scholten	2004	UK 2004	1				2004										
10	(England) Colin Lloyd	2004	WGP 2004	2		2005	2004											
11	(Netherlands) Raymond van Barneveld	2006	UK 2006	6	2007			2006; 2007	2012				2014		2007			
12	(England) James Wade	2007	WM 2007	11		2007	2007; 2010	2008; 2011; 2021		2018		2014	2009	2018			2010	
13	(England) Colin Osborne	2009	CHL 2009	1													2009	
14	(Australia) Paul Nicholson	2010	PCF 2010	1							2010							
15	(England) Scott Waites	2010	GS 2010	1					2010									
16	(England) Adrian Lewis	2011	WC 2011	4	2011; 2012			2014		2013								
17	(Scotland) Gary Anderson	2011	PL 2011	8	2015; 2016	2018		2018			2014		2011; 2015					2018
18	(England) Kevin Painter	2011	PCF 2011	1							2011 (Dec)							
19	(Scotland) Robert Thornton	2012	UK 2012	2			2015	2012										
20	(Netherlands) Michael van Gerwen	2012	WGP 2012	48	2014; 2017; 2019	2015; 2016; 2022	2012; 2014; 2016; 2018; 2019; 2022	2015; 2016; 2020	2015; 2016; 2017	2014; 2015; 2016; 2017	2013; 2015; 2016; 2017; 2019; 2020; 2022	2015; 2016; 2017; 2018; 2019	2013; 2016; 2017; 2018; 2019; 2022; 2023	2015; 2016; 2017; 2019; 2023; 2025				2019
21	(Australia) Simon Whitlock	2012	EC 2012	1						2012								
22	(Scotland) Peter Wright	2017	UK 2017	8	2020; 2022	2021		2017		2020; 2023	2021	2020						
23	(Northern Ireland) Daryl Gurney	2017	WGP 2017	2			2017				2018							
24	(Austria) Mensur Suljović	2017	CLD 2017	1														2017
25	(England) Rob Cross	2018	WC 2018	4	2018	2019				2019; 2021								
26	(Wales) Gerwyn Price	2018	GS 2018	7	2021		2020		2018; 2019; 2021					2020; 2022				
27	(England) Nathan Aspinall	2019	UK 2019	2		2023		2019										
28	(Belgium) Dimitri Van den Bergh	2020	WM 2020	2		2020		2024										
29	(England) Glen Durrant	2020	PL 2020	1									2020					
30	(Portugal) José de Sousa	2020	GS 2020	1					2020									
31	(Wales) Jonny Clayton	2021	MAS 2021	4			2021					2021	2021	2021				
32	(England) Joe Cullen	2022	MAS 2022	1								2022						
33	(Netherlands) Danny Noppert	2022	UK 2022	1				2022										
34	(England) Ross Smith	2022	EC 2022	3						2022; 2026				2026				
35	(England) Michael Smith	2022	GS 2022	2	2023				2022									
36	(England) Chris Dobey	2023	MAS 2023	1								2023						
37	(England) Andrew Gilding	2023	UK 2023	1				2023										
38	(England) Luke Humphries	2023	WGP 2023	9	2024	2024	2023; 2026		2023		2023; 2024	2025	2025					
39	(England) Stephen Bunting	2024	MAS 2024	1								2024						
40	(England) Luke Littler	2024	PL 2024	14	2025; 2026	2025; 2026	2025	2025; 2026	2024; 2025		2025	2026	2024; 2026	2024				
41	(Belgium) Mike De Decker	2024	WGP 2024	1			2024											
42	(England) Ritchie Edhouse	2024	EC 2024	1						2024								
43	(Netherlands) Gian van Veen	2025	EC 2025	1						2025								
Total				244	33	33	29	24	19	19	18	14	22	12	8	3	6	4

== List of finals ==
As of 25 October 2026, the following table lists the final of each completed edition included in this article, with champions listed as often as they won. Finals are presented in chronological order by the date each final was played, and the Year column retains this order when sorted. Scores are shown from the champion's perspective. (s) denotes sets and (l) denotes legs. The Players Championship Finals was held twice in 2011. The averages are the finalists' three-dart averages in the final, not their overall tournament averages. Empty average cells indicate figures not verified from the available historical records. Historical averages have been checked against compiled finals data and tournament result archives. Some older match reports and statistical databases differ by 0.01 in their reported three-dart averages; where match records are available, the figures here use the archived match statistics.

List of PDC individual premier event finals (1994–2026; 244 finals)
Year	Tournament	Champion	Champion avg.	Score	Runner-up	Runner-up avg.
1994	World Championship	(England) Dennis Priestley	94.38	6–1 (s)	(England) Phil Taylor	85.62
1994	World Matchplay	(United States) Larry Butler	92.70	16–12 (l)	(England) Dennis Priestley	91.59
1995	World Championship	(England) Phil Taylor	94.11	6–2 (s)	(England) Rod Harrington	87.15
1995	World Matchplay	(England) Phil Taylor	90.72	16–11 (l)	(England) Dennis Priestley	87.63
1996	World Championship	(England) Phil Taylor	98.52	6–4 (s)	(England) Dennis Priestley	101.48
1996	World Matchplay	(England) Peter Evison	100.50	16–14 (l)	(England) Dennis Priestley	96.66
1997	World Championship	(England) Phil Taylor	100.92	6–3 (s)	(England) Dennis Priestley	96.78
1997	World Matchplay	(England) Phil Taylor	106.32	16–11 (l)	(England) Alan Warriner-Little	98.43
1998	World Championship	(England) Phil Taylor	103.98	6–0 (s)	(England) Dennis Priestley	90.75
1998	World Matchplay	(England) Rod Harrington	95.04	19–17 (l)	(England) Ronnie Baxter	94.08
1998	World Grand Prix	(England) Phil Taylor	94.61	13–8 (l)	(England) Rod Harrington	86.64
1999	World Championship	(England) Phil Taylor	97.11	6–2 (s)	(England) Peter Manley	93.63
1999	World Matchplay	(England) Rod Harrington	85.94	19–17 (l)	(England) Peter Manley	86.92
1999	World Grand Prix	(England) Phil Taylor	92.59	6–1 (s)	(England) Shayne Burgess	81.26
2000	World Championship	(England) Phil Taylor	94.42	7–3 (s)	(England) Dennis Priestley	91.80
2000	World Matchplay	(England) Phil Taylor	100.32	18–12 (l)	(England) Alan Warriner-Little	97.14
2000	World Grand Prix	(England) Phil Taylor	91.33	6–1 (s)	(England) Shayne Burgess	81.48
2001	World Championship	(England) Phil Taylor	107.46	7–0 (s)	(Canada) John Part	92.58
2001	World Matchplay	(England) Phil Taylor	99.57	18–10 (l)	(Wales) Richie Burnett	90.99
2001	World Grand Prix	(England) Alan Warriner-Little	83.52	8–2 (s)	(Netherlands) Roland Scholten	81.83
2002	World Championship	(England) Phil Taylor	98.47	7–0 (s)	(England) Peter Manley	91.35
2002	Las Vegas Desert Classic	(England) Phil Taylor	103.98	3–0 (s)	(England) Ronnie Baxter	98.46
2002	World Matchplay	(England) Phil Taylor	98.76	18–16 (l)	(Canada) John Part	94.14
2002	World Grand Prix	(England) Phil Taylor	100.17	7–3 (s)	(Canada) John Part	88.63
2003	World Championship	(Canada) John Part	96.87	7–6 (s)	(England) Phil Taylor	99.98
2003	UK Open	(England) Phil Taylor	98.03	18–8 (l)	(England) Shayne Burgess	91.36
2003	Las Vegas Desert Classic	(England) Peter Manley	96.81	16–12 (l)	(Canada) John Part	95.07
2003	World Matchplay	(England) Phil Taylor	97.44	18–12 (l)	(England) Wayne Mardle	94.38
2003	World Grand Prix	(England) Phil Taylor	94.81	7–2 (s)	(Canada) John Part	83.24
2004	World Championship	(England) Phil Taylor	96.03	7–6 (s)	(England) Kevin Painter	90.48
2004	UK Open	(Netherlands) Roland Scholten	89.49	11–6 (l)	(Canada) John Part	85.98
2004	Las Vegas Desert Classic	(England) Phil Taylor	100.80	6–4 (s)	(England) Wayne Mardle	95.22
2004	World Matchplay	(England) Phil Taylor	100.12	18–8 (l)	(England) Mark Dudbridge	89.24
2004	World Grand Prix	(England) Colin Lloyd	85.28	7–3 (s)	(England) Alan Warriner-Little	77.90
2005	World Championship	(England) Phil Taylor	96.14	7–4 (s)	(England) Mark Dudbridge	90.66
2005	Premier League	(England) Phil Taylor	101.01	16–4 (l)	(England) Colin Lloyd	97.20
2005	UK Open	(England) Phil Taylor	96.80	13–7 (l)	(England) Mark Walsh	84.52
2005	Las Vegas Desert Classic	(England) Phil Taylor	101.97	6–1 (s)	(England) Wayne Mardle	94.77
2005	World Matchplay	(England) Colin Lloyd	97.89	18–12 (l)	(Canada) John Part	94.53
2005	World Grand Prix	(England) Phil Taylor	90.74	7–1 (s)	(England) Colin Lloyd	82.05
2006	World Championship	(England) Phil Taylor	106.74	7–0 (s)	(England) Peter Manley	91.72
2006	World Series of Darts	(England) Phil Taylor	102.48	13–5 (l)	(England) Adrian Lewis	93.06
2006	Premier League	(England) Phil Taylor	101.41	16–6 (l)	(Netherlands) Roland Scholten	92.01
2006	UK Open	(Netherlands) Raymond van Barneveld	91.51	13–7 (l)	(Wales) Barrie Bates	82.98
2006	Las Vegas Desert Classic	(Canada) John Part	92.79	6–3 (s)	(Netherlands) Raymond van Barneveld	92.85
2006	World Matchplay	(England) Phil Taylor	100.08	18–11 (l)	(England) James Wade	90.00
2006	World Grand Prix	(England) Phil Taylor	88.24	7–4 (s)	(England) Terry Jenkins	82.51
2007	World Championship	(Netherlands) Raymond van Barneveld	100.93	7–6 (s)	(England) Phil Taylor	100.86
2007	US Open	(England) Phil Taylor	103.11	4–1 (s)	(Netherlands) Raymond van Barneveld	99.06
2007	Premier League	(England) Phil Taylor	99.20	16–6 (l)	(England) Terry Jenkins	90.81
2007	UK Open	(Netherlands) Raymond van Barneveld	94.99	16–8 (l)	(Netherlands) Vincent van der Voort	88.76
2007	Las Vegas Desert Classic	(Netherlands) Raymond van Barneveld	101.55	13–6 (l)	(England) Terry Jenkins	92.37
2007	World Matchplay	(England) James Wade	96.84	18–7 (l)	(England) Terry Jenkins	91.62
2007	World Grand Prix	(England) James Wade	86.03	6–3 (s)	(England) Terry Jenkins	84.58
2007	Grand Slam of Darts	(England) Phil Taylor	101.75	18–11 (l)	(England) Andy Hamilton	100.97
2008	World Championship	(Canada) John Part	92.86	7–2 (s)	(England) Kirk Shepherd	85.10
2008	US Open	(England) Phil Taylor	96.87	3–0 (s)	(England) Colin Lloyd	91.50
2008	Premier League	(England) Phil Taylor	108.36	16–8 (l)	(England) James Wade	100.14
2008	UK Open	(England) James Wade	94.65	11–7 (l)	(United States) Gary Mawson	87.33
2008	Las Vegas Desert Classic	(England) Phil Taylor	105.54	13–7 (l)	(England) James Wade	92.25
2008	World Matchplay	(England) Phil Taylor	109.47	18–9 (l)	(England) James Wade	102.57
2008	World Grand Prix	(England) Phil Taylor	97.81	6–2 (s)	(Netherlands) Raymond van Barneveld	90.42
2008	Championship League Darts	(England) Phil Taylor		7–5 (l)	(England) Mervyn King	
2008	European Championship	(England) Phil Taylor	104.35	11–5 (l)	(England) Adrian Lewis	96.56
2008	Grand Slam of Darts	(England) Phil Taylor	106.25	18–9 (l)	(England) Terry Jenkins	100.92
2009	World Championship	(England) Phil Taylor	110.94	7–1 (s)	(Netherlands) Raymond van Barneveld	101.18
2009	Players Championship Finals	(England) Phil Taylor	99.71	16–9 (l)	(Scotland) Robert Thornton	88.52
2009	Premier League	(England) James Wade	90.38	13–8 (l)	(England) Mervyn King	85.83
2009	UK Open	(England) Phil Taylor	100.81	11–6 (l)	(England) Colin Osborne	93.24
2009	Las Vegas Desert Classic	(England) Phil Taylor	102.21	13–11 (l)	(Netherlands) Raymond van Barneveld	98.52
2009	World Matchplay	(England) Phil Taylor	106.05	18–4 (l)	(England) Terry Jenkins	92.31
2009	World Grand Prix	(England) Phil Taylor	97.07	6–3 (s)	(Netherlands) Raymond van Barneveld	86.62
2009	Championship League Darts	(England) Colin Osborne		6–4 (l)	(England) Phil Taylor	
2009	European Championship	(England) Phil Taylor	109.35	11–3 (l)	(England) Steve Beaton	97.16
2009	Grand Slam of Darts	(England) Phil Taylor	103.94	16–2 (l)	(England) Scott Waites	94.16
2010	World Championship	(England) Phil Taylor	104.38	7–3 (s)	(Australia) Simon Whitlock	100.51
2010	Players Championship Finals	(Australia) Paul Nicholson	92.75	13–11 (l)	(England) Mervyn King	89.74
2010	Premier League	(England) Phil Taylor	111.67	10–8 (l)	(England) James Wade	100.08
2010	UK Open	(England) Phil Taylor	97.71	11–5 (l)	(Scotland) Gary Anderson	92.41
2010	World Matchplay	(England) Phil Taylor	105.15	18–12 (l)	(Netherlands) Raymond van Barneveld	100.11
2010	European Championship	(England) Phil Taylor	105.74	11–1 (l)	(England) Wayne Jones	94.64
2010	World Grand Prix	(England) James Wade	88.92	6–3 (s)	(England) Adrian Lewis	89.33
2010	Championship League Darts	(England) James Wade		6–5 (l)	(England) Phil Taylor	
2010	Grand Slam of Darts	(England) Scott Waites	99.86	16–12 (l)	(England) James Wade	92.79
2011	World Championship	(England) Adrian Lewis	99.40	7–5 (s)	(Scotland) Gary Anderson	99.41
2011 (February)	Players Championship Finals (February)	(England) Phil Taylor	97.01	13–12 (l)	(Scotland) Gary Anderson	96.31
2011	Premier League	(Scotland) Gary Anderson	94.67	10–4 (l)	(England) Adrian Lewis	85.75
2011	UK Open	(England) James Wade	96.25	11–8 (l)	(England) Wes Newton	88.51
2011	World Matchplay	(England) Phil Taylor	103.83	18–8 (l)	(England) James Wade	98.85
2011	European Championship	(England) Phil Taylor	109.29	11–8 (l)	(England) Adrian Lewis	98.72
2011	World Grand Prix	(England) Phil Taylor	90.29	6–3 (s)	(Northern Ireland) Brendan Dolan	84.68
2011	Championship League Darts	(England) Phil Taylor	113.71	6–1 (l)	(Australia) Paul Nicholson	
2011	Grand Slam of Darts	(England) Phil Taylor	109.04	16–4 (l)	(Scotland) Gary Anderson	98.92
2011 (December)	Players Championship Finals (December)	(England) Kevin Painter	96.28	13–9 (l)	(Wales) Mark Webster	93.31
2012	World Championship	(England) Adrian Lewis	93.06	7–3 (s)	(England) Andy Hamilton	90.83
2012	Premier League	(England) Phil Taylor	97.08	10–7 (l)	(Australia) Simon Whitlock	95.32
2012	UK Open	(Scotland) Robert Thornton	95.44	11–5 (l)	(England) Phil Taylor	98.58
2012	World Matchplay	(England) Phil Taylor	98.97	18–15 (l)	(England) James Wade	95.91
2012	European Championship	(Australia) Simon Whitlock	94.91	11–5 (l)	(England) Wes Newton	89.47
2012	World Grand Prix	(Netherlands) Michael van Gerwen	87.53	6–4 (s)	(England) Mervyn King	81.96
2012	Championship League Darts	(England) Phil Taylor	108.20	6–4 (l)	(Australia) Simon Whitlock	98.63
2012	Grand Slam of Darts	(Netherlands) Raymond van Barneveld	95.79	16–14 (l)	(Netherlands) Michael van Gerwen	98.55
2012	Players Championship Finals	(England) Phil Taylor	103.57	13–6 (l)	(Belgium) Kim Huybrechts	91.70
2013	World Championship	(England) Phil Taylor	103.04	7–4 (s)	(Netherlands) Michael van Gerwen	100.66
2013	Premier League	(Netherlands) Michael van Gerwen	103.29	10–8 (l)	(England) Phil Taylor	104.10
2013	UK Open	(England) Phil Taylor	107.04	11–4 (l)	(England) Andy Hamilton	97.95
2013	European Championship	(England) Adrian Lewis	103.34	11–6 (l)	(Australia) Simon Whitlock	99.59
2013	World Matchplay	(England) Phil Taylor	111.23	18–13 (l)	(England) Adrian Lewis	105.92
2013	World Grand Prix	(England) Phil Taylor	97.67	6–0 (s)	(England) Dave Chisnall	81.29
2013	Championship League Darts	(England) Phil Taylor	107.07	6–3 (l)	(Netherlands) Michael van Gerwen	106.23
2013	Masters	(England) Phil Taylor	108.50	10–1 (l)	(England) Adrian Lewis	100.03
2013	Grand Slam of Darts	(England) Phil Taylor	98.14	16–6 (l)	(Scotland) Robert Thornton	97.02
2013	Players Championship Finals	(Netherlands) Michael van Gerwen	102.45	11–7 (l)	(England) Phil Taylor	102.64
2014	World Championship	(Netherlands) Michael van Gerwen	100.10	7–4 (s)	(Scotland) Peter Wright	95.71
2014	UK Open	(England) Adrian Lewis	109.13	11–1 (l)	(England) Terry Jenkins	93.15
2014	Premier League	(Netherlands) Raymond van Barneveld	101.93	10–6 (l)	(Netherlands) Michael van Gerwen	102.98
2014	World Matchplay	(England) Phil Taylor	107.19	18–9 (l)	(Netherlands) Michael van Gerwen	101.49
2014	World Grand Prix	(Netherlands) Michael van Gerwen	90.81	5–3 (s)	(England) James Wade	89.26
2014	European Championship	(Netherlands) Michael van Gerwen	98.16	11–4 (l)	(England) Terry Jenkins	92.90
2014	Masters	(England) James Wade	91.39	11–10 (l)	(England) Mervyn King	92.15
2014	Grand Slam of Darts	(England) Phil Taylor	102.45	16–13 (l)	(England) Dave Chisnall	98.02
2014	Players Championship Finals	(Scotland) Gary Anderson	101.01	11–6 (l)	(England) Adrian Lewis	95.37
2015	World Championship	(Scotland) Gary Anderson	97.68	7–6 (s)	(England) Phil Taylor	100.69
2015	Masters	(Netherlands) Michael van Gerwen	112.49	11–6 (l)	(Netherlands) Raymond van Barneveld	96.13
2015	UK Open	(Netherlands) Michael van Gerwen	98.43	11–5 (l)	(Scotland) Peter Wright	99.33
2015	Premier League	(Scotland) Gary Anderson	104.85	11–7 (l)	(Netherlands) Michael van Gerwen	105.81
2015	World Matchplay	(Netherlands) Michael van Gerwen	99.91	18–12 (l)	(England) James Wade	90.37
2015	World Grand Prix	(Scotland) Robert Thornton	90.79	5–4 (s)	(Netherlands) Michael van Gerwen	96.79
2015	European Championship	(Netherlands) Michael van Gerwen	107.28	11–10 (l)	(Scotland) Gary Anderson	102.42
2015	Grand Slam of Darts	(Netherlands) Michael van Gerwen	100.94	16–13 (l)	(England) Phil Taylor	102.53
2015	World Series of Darts Finals	(Netherlands) Michael van Gerwen	106.60	11–10 (l)	(Scotland) Peter Wright	106.40
2015	Players Championship Finals	(Netherlands) Michael van Gerwen	100.32	11–6 (l)	(England) Adrian Lewis	89.17
2016	World Championship	(Scotland) Gary Anderson	99.26	7–5 (s)	(England) Adrian Lewis	100.23
2016	Masters	(Netherlands) Michael van Gerwen	98.94	11–6 (l)	(England) Dave Chisnall	96.71
2016	UK Open	(Netherlands) Michael van Gerwen	106.68	11–4 (l)	(Scotland) Peter Wright	98.33
2016	Premier League	(Netherlands) Michael van Gerwen	104.68	11–3 (l)	(England) Phil Taylor	98.84
2016	World Matchplay	(Netherlands) Michael van Gerwen	103.93	18–10 (l)	(England) Phil Taylor	101.13
2016	Champions League of Darts	(England) Phil Taylor	98.97	11–5 (l)	(Netherlands) Michael van Gerwen	100.92
2016	World Grand Prix	(Netherlands) Michael van Gerwen	100.29	5–2 (s)	(Scotland) Gary Anderson	92.73
2016	European Championship	(Netherlands) Michael van Gerwen	111.62	11–1 (l)	(Austria) Mensur Suljović	85.91
2016	World Series of Darts Finals	(Netherlands) Michael van Gerwen	101.18	11–9 (l)	(Scotland) Peter Wright	99.63
2016	Grand Slam of Darts	(Netherlands) Michael van Gerwen	98.74	16–8 (l)	(England) James Wade	90.73
2016	Players Championship Finals	(Netherlands) Michael van Gerwen	108.34	11–3 (l)	(England) Dave Chisnall	99.24
2017	World Championship	(Netherlands) Michael van Gerwen	108.06	7–3 (s)	(Scotland) Gary Anderson	104.93
2017	Masters	(Netherlands) Michael van Gerwen	109.42	11–7 (l)	(Scotland) Gary Anderson	103.58
2017	UK Open	(Scotland) Peter Wright	100.44	11–7 (l)	(Wales) Gerwyn Price	97.78
2017	Premier League	(Netherlands) Michael van Gerwen	104.76	11–10 (l)	(Scotland) Peter Wright	101.06
2017	World Matchplay	(England) Phil Taylor	104.24	18–8 (l)	(Scotland) Peter Wright	99.74
2017	Champions League of Darts	(Austria) Mensur Suljović	87.85	11–9 (l)	(Scotland) Gary Anderson	98.03
2017	World Grand Prix	(Northern Ireland) Daryl Gurney	88.50	5–4 (s)	(Australia) Simon Whitlock	83.53
2017	European Championship	(Netherlands) Michael van Gerwen	108.91	11–7 (l)	(England) Rob Cross	102.39
2017	World Series of Darts Finals	(Netherlands) Michael van Gerwen	103.30	11–6 (l)	(Scotland) Gary Anderson	100.68
2017	Grand Slam of Darts	(Netherlands) Michael van Gerwen	102.18	16–12 (l)	(Scotland) Peter Wright	97.71
2017	Players Championship Finals	(Netherlands) Michael van Gerwen	105.50	11–2 (l)	(Wales) Jonny Clayton	94.64
2018	World Championship	(England) Rob Cross	107.67	7–2 (s)	(England) Phil Taylor	102.26
2018	Masters	(Netherlands) Michael van Gerwen	105.85	11–9 (l)	(Netherlands) Raymond van Barneveld	100.55
2018	UK Open	(Scotland) Gary Anderson	95.71	11–7 (l)	(Australia) Corey Cadby	99.78
2018	Premier League	(Netherlands) Michael van Gerwen	112.37	11–4 (l)	(England) Michael Smith	97.01
2018	World Matchplay	(Scotland) Gary Anderson	101.12	21–19 (l)	(Austria) Mensur Suljović	104.43
2018	Champions League of Darts	(Scotland) Gary Anderson	101.47	11–4 (l)	(Scotland) Peter Wright	93.85
2018	World Grand Prix	(Netherlands) Michael van Gerwen	88.85	5–2 (s)	(Scotland) Peter Wright	91.61
2018	European Championship	(England) James Wade	91.44	11–8 (l)	(Australia) Simon Whitlock	88.81
2018	World Series of Darts Finals	(England) James Wade	97.00	11–10 (l)	(England) Michael Smith	99.09
2018	Grand Slam of Darts	(Wales) Gerwyn Price	96.70	16–13 (l)	(Scotland) Gary Anderson	97.25
2018	Players Championship Finals	(Northern Ireland) Daryl Gurney	95.61	11–9 (l)	(Netherlands) Michael van Gerwen	100.20
2019	World Championship	(Netherlands) Michael van Gerwen	102.21	7–3 (s)	(England) Michael Smith	95.29
2019	Masters	(Netherlands) Michael van Gerwen	99.82	11–5 (l)	(England) James Wade	87.44
2019	UK Open	(England) Nathan Aspinall	88.72	11–5 (l)	(England) Rob Cross	84.79
2019	Premier League	(Netherlands) Michael van Gerwen	103.36	11–5 (l)	(England) Rob Cross	100.98
2019	World Matchplay	(England) Rob Cross	95.16	18–13 (l)	(England) Michael Smith	95.91
2019	World Grand Prix	(Netherlands) Michael van Gerwen	94.74	5–2 (s)	(England) Dave Chisnall	93.32
2019	Champions League of Darts	(Netherlands) Michael van Gerwen	100.87	11–10 (l)	(Scotland) Peter Wright	97.42
2019	European Championship	(England) Rob Cross	93.12	11–6 (l)	(Wales) Gerwyn Price	84.51
2019	World Series of Darts Finals	(Netherlands) Michael van Gerwen	96.76	11–2 (l)	(Netherlands) Danny Noppert	89.37
2019	Grand Slam of Darts	(Wales) Gerwyn Price	107.86	16–6 (l)	(Scotland) Peter Wright	96.28
2019	Players Championship Finals	(Netherlands) Michael van Gerwen	97.92	11–9 (l)	(Wales) Gerwyn Price	96.48
2020	World Championship	(Scotland) Peter Wright	102.79	7–3 (s)	(Netherlands) Michael van Gerwen	102.88
2020	Masters	(Scotland) Peter Wright	95.01	11–10 (l)	(England) Michael Smith	89.71
2020	UK Open	(Netherlands) Michael van Gerwen	101.42	11–9 (l)	(Wales) Gerwyn Price	99.16
2020	World Matchplay	(Belgium) Dimitri Van den Bergh	98.31	18–10 (l)	(Scotland) Gary Anderson	92.81
2020	World Series of Darts Finals	(Wales) Gerwyn Price	96.21	11–9 (l)	(England) Rob Cross	94.22
2020	World Grand Prix	(Wales) Gerwyn Price	88.19	5–2 (s)	(Netherlands) Dirk van Duijvenbode	87.07
2020	Premier League	(England) Glen Durrant	91.84	11–8 (l)	(England) Nathan Aspinall	92.15
2020	European Championship	(Scotland) Peter Wright	104.33	11–4 (l)	(England) James Wade	95.28
2020	Grand Slam of Darts	(Portugal) José de Sousa	99.95	16–12 (l)	(England) James Wade	94.26
2020	Players Championship Finals	(Netherlands) Michael van Gerwen	104.98	11–10 (l)	(England) Mervyn King	99.78
2021	World Championship	(Wales) Gerwyn Price	100.08	7–3 (s)	(Scotland) Gary Anderson	94.25
2021	Masters	(Wales) Jonny Clayton	104.10	11–8 (l)	(England) Mervyn King	94.95
2021	UK Open	(England) James Wade	102.52	11–5 (l)	(England) Luke Humphries	97.95
2021	Premier League	(Wales) Jonny Clayton	100.18	11–5 (l)	(Portugal) José de Sousa	100.53
2021	World Matchplay	(Scotland) Peter Wright	105.90	18–9 (l)	(Belgium) Dimitri Van den Bergh	100.88
2021	World Grand Prix	(Wales) Jonny Clayton	94.44	5–1 (s)	(Wales) Gerwyn Price	92.47
2021	European Championship	(England) Rob Cross	92.91	11–8 (l)	(Netherlands) Michael van Gerwen	93.66
2021	World Series of Darts Finals	(Wales) Jonny Clayton	101.63	11–6 (l)	(Belgium) Dimitri Van den Bergh	101.95
2021	Grand Slam of Darts	(Wales) Gerwyn Price	103.90	16–8 (l)	(Scotland) Peter Wright	91.51
2021	Players Championship Finals	(Scotland) Peter Wright	95.49	11–10 (l)	(England) Ryan Searle	92.10
2022	World Championship	(Scotland) Peter Wright	98.34	7–5 (s)	(England) Michael Smith	99.22
2022	Masters	(England) Joe Cullen	96.89	11–9 (l)	(England) Dave Chisnall	90.23
2022	UK Open	(Netherlands) Danny Noppert	84.82	11–10 (l)	(England) Michael Smith	90.33
2022	Premier League	(Netherlands) Michael van Gerwen	99.10	11–10 (l)	(England) Joe Cullen	99.36
2022	World Matchplay	(Netherlands) Michael van Gerwen	101.19	18–14 (l)	(Wales) Gerwyn Price	96.92
2022	World Series of Darts Finals	(Wales) Gerwyn Price	100.14	11–10 (l)	(Netherlands) Dirk van Duijvenbode	97.69
2022	World Grand Prix	(Netherlands) Michael van Gerwen	91.07	5–3 (s)	(England) Nathan Aspinall	91.88
2022	European Championship	(England) Ross Smith	101.32	11–8 (l)	(England) Michael Smith	100.47
2022	Grand Slam of Darts	(England) Michael Smith	96.84	16–5 (l)	(England) Nathan Aspinall	90.94
2022	Players Championship Finals	(Netherlands) Michael van Gerwen	99.92	11–6 (l)	(England) Rob Cross	100.33
2023	World Championship	(England) Michael Smith	100.87	7–4 (s)	(Netherlands) Michael van Gerwen	99.58
2023	Masters	(England) Chris Dobey	94.05	11–7 (l)	(England) Rob Cross	90.20
2023	UK Open	(England) Andrew Gilding	95.46	11–10 (l)	(Netherlands) Michael van Gerwen	96.74
2023	Premier League	(Netherlands) Michael van Gerwen	105.43	11–5 (l)	(Wales) Gerwyn Price	99.50
2023	World Matchplay	(England) Nathan Aspinall	96.21	18–6 (l)	(Wales) Jonny Clayton	93.56
2023	World Series of Darts Finals	(Netherlands) Michael van Gerwen	96.16	11–4 (l)	(England) Nathan Aspinall	83.57
2023	World Grand Prix	(England) Luke Humphries	93.30	5–2 (s)	(Wales) Gerwyn Price	91.00
2023	European Championship	(Scotland) Peter Wright	97.39	11–6 (l)	(England) James Wade	92.09
2023	Grand Slam of Darts	(England) Luke Humphries	104.69	16–8 (l)	(England) Rob Cross	103.61
2023	Players Championship Finals	(England) Luke Humphries	100.75	11–9 (l)	(Netherlands) Michael van Gerwen	103.19
2024	World Championship	(England) Luke Humphries	103.67	7–4 (s)	(England) Luke Littler	101.13
2024	Masters	(England) Stephen Bunting	102.50	11–7 (l)	(Netherlands) Michael van Gerwen	98.27
2024	UK Open	(Belgium) Dimitri Van den Bergh	95.18	11–10 (l)	(England) Luke Humphries	96.07
2024	Premier League	(England) Luke Littler	105.60	11–7 (l)	(England) Luke Humphries	102.47
2024	World Matchplay	(England) Luke Humphries	100.94	18–15 (l)	(Netherlands) Michael van Gerwen	98.74
2024	World Series of Darts Finals	(England) Luke Littler	102.21	11–4 (l)	(England) Michael Smith	92.97
2024	World Grand Prix	(Belgium) Mike De Decker	92.06	6–4 (s)	(England) Luke Humphries	90.56
2024	European Championship	(England) Ritchie Edhouse	90.55	11–3 (l)	(Netherlands) Jermaine Wattimena	84.64
2024	Grand Slam of Darts	(England) Luke Littler	107.08	16–3 (l)	(England) Martin Lukeman	93.42
2024	Players Championship Finals	(England) Luke Humphries	103.69	11–7 (l)	(England) Luke Littler	100.08
2025	World Championship	(England) Luke Littler	102.73	7–3 (s)	(Netherlands) Michael van Gerwen	100.69
2025	World Masters	(England) Luke Humphries	100.42	6–5 (s)	(Wales) Jonny Clayton	98.25
2025	UK Open	(England) Luke Littler	101.51	11–2 (l)	(England) James Wade	88.06
2025	Premier League	(England) Luke Humphries	97.86	11–8 (l)	(England) Luke Littler	100.29
2025	World Matchplay	(England) Luke Littler	107.24	18–13 (l)	(England) James Wade	101.54
2025	World Series of Darts Finals	(Netherlands) Michael van Gerwen	98.37	11–7 (l)	(England) Luke Littler	101.99
2025	World Grand Prix	(England) Luke Littler	92.15	6–1 (s)	(England) Luke Humphries	93.61
2025	European Championship	(Netherlands) Gian van Veen	101.00	11–10 (l)	(England) Luke Humphries	95.24
2025	Grand Slam of Darts	(England) Luke Littler	100.61	16–11 (l)	(England) Luke Humphries	99.56
2025	Players Championship Finals	(England) Luke Littler	103.33	11–8 (l)	(England) Nathan Aspinall	93.64
2026	World Championship	(England) Luke Littler	106.02	7–1 (s)	(Netherlands) Gian van Veen	99.94
2026	World Masters	(England) Luke Littler	104.72	6–5 (s)	(England) Luke Humphries	105.51
2026	UK Open	(England) Luke Littler	99.58	11–7 (l)	(England) James Wade	89.49
2026	Premier League	(England) Luke Littler	111.67	11–10 (l)	(England) Luke Humphries	105.60
2026	World Matchplay	(England) Luke Littler	111.53	18–9 (l)	(Wales) Gerwyn Price	104.97
2026	World Series of Darts Finals	(England) Ross Smith	103.89	11–5 (l)	(Wales) Gerwyn Price	97.28
2026	World Grand Prix	(England) Luke Humphries	93.16	6–4 (s)	(Wales) Gerwyn Price	95.37
2026	European Championship	(England) Ross Smith	92.92	11–8 (l)	(Germany) Martin Schindler	91.49

== See also ==
- Professional Darts Corporation
- PDC Triple Crown
- PDC Order of Merit
- List of darts players
