= 2019 Champions League of Darts =

2019 Cazoo Champions League of Darts

Tournament information
- Dates: 19–20 October 2019
- Venue: Leicester Arena
- Location: Leicester, England
- Organisation(s): Professional Darts Corporation (PDC)
- Format: Legs
- Prize fund: £250,000
- Winner's share: £60,000
- High checkout: 170 Michael Smith

Champion(s)
- Michael van Gerwen (NED)

The 2019 Cazoo Champions League of Darts was the 4th annual staging of the Champions League of Darts, organised by the Professional Darts Corporation. It took place from 19 to 20 October 2019 at the Leicester Arena, Leicester.

The defending champion was Gary Anderson who beat Peter Wright 11–4 in the 2018 final, but he was eliminated in the group stage.

Michael van Gerwen won the Champions League for the first time, beating Peter Wright 11–10 in the final, surviving three match darts at 7–10, and by winning that title, van Gerwen became the only player to win every PDC premier event title at least once.

== Format ==
The eight qualifiers are split into two groups, playing each other once in a best of 19 legs match. The top two of each group then proceed to the semi-finals. Both semi-finals and the final are a best of 21 legs match.

== Prize money ==
Stage (number of players)		Prize money (Total: £235,000)
Winner	(1)	£60,000
Runner-up	(1)	£25,000
Semi-finalists	(2)	£17,500
Third in group stage	(2)	£10,000
Fourth in group stage	(2)	£5,000

== Qualifiers ==
The top 7 players on the PDC Order of Merit following the 2019 World Matchplay qualified. Reigning champion Gary Anderson was given a guaranteed place in the tournament, as he was the defending champion. As Anderson was in the top seven, the eighth ranked player also qualified.

Gerwyn Price made his Champions League debut.

1. (Netherlands) Michael van Gerwen (champion)
2. (England) Rob Cross (group stage)
3. (Northern Ireland) Daryl Gurney (group stage)
4. (England) Michael Smith (semi-finals)
5. (Scotland) Gary Anderson (group stage)
6. (Scotland) Peter Wright (runner-up)
7. (Wales) Gerwyn Price (semi-finals)
8. (England) James Wade (group stage)

== Results ==
=== Group stage ===
All matches first-to-10 (best of 19 legs)

NB: P = Played; W = Won; L = Lost; LF = Legs for; LA = Legs against; +/− = Plus/minus record, in relation to legs; Avg = Three-dart average in group matches; Pts = Group points

=== Group A ===
Pos.	Player	P	W	L	LF	LA	+/–	Avg	Pts
1	(Netherlands) Michael van Gerwen (1)	3	3	0	30	18	+12	101.63	6
2	(England) Michael Smith (4)	3	2	1	26	25	+1	96.77	4
3	(England) James Wade (8)	3	1	2	26	29	–3	95.57	2
4	(Scotland) Gary Anderson (5)	3	0	3	20	30	–10	96.75	0

19 October

103.40 (1) (Netherlands) Michael van Gerwen	10 – 8	(England) James Wade (8) 98.84
100.64 (4) (England) Michael Smith	10 – 7	(Scotland) Gary Anderson (5) 97.76

19 October

100.19 (1) (Netherlands) Michael van Gerwen	10 – 6	(England) Michael Smith (4) 98.24
99.56 (5) (Scotland) Gary Anderson	9 – 10	(England) James Wade (8) 95.14

20 October

101.16 (1) (Netherlands) Michael van Gerwen	10 – 4	(Scotland) Gary Anderson (5) 91.72
92.07 (4) (England) Michael Smith	10 – 8	(England) James Wade (8) 93.03

=== Group B ===
Pos.	Player	P	W	L	LF	LA	+/–	Avg	Pts
1	(Scotland) Peter Wright (6)	3	3	0	30	23	+7	97.04	6
2	(Wales) Gerwyn Price (7)	3	2	1	28	21	+7	100.25	4
3	(Northern Ireland) Daryl Gurney (3)	3	1	2	23	26	–3	92.01	2
4	(England) Rob Cross (2)	3	0	3	19	30	–11	95.68	0

19 October

94.38 (2) (England) Rob Cross	5 – 10	(Wales) Gerwyn Price (7) 99.34
85.80 (3) (Northern Ireland) Daryl Gurney	7 – 10	(Scotland) Peter Wright (6) 89.76

19 October

94.60 (2) (England) Rob Cross	6 – 10	(Northern Ireland) Daryl Gurney (3) 97.60
102.82 (6) (Scotland) Peter Wright	10 – 8	(Wales) Gerwyn Price (7) 100.34

20 October

97.75 (2) (England) Rob Cross	8 – 10	(Scotland) Peter Wright (6) 99.44
93.73 (3) (Northern Ireland) Daryl Gurney	6 – 10	(Wales) Gerwyn Price (7) 101.04

=== Knockout stage ===
Semi-finals (best of 21 legs); 20 October
A1	(Netherlands) Michael van Gerwen (1) 105.54	11
B2	(Wales) Gerwyn Price (7) 102.49	10
B1	(Scotland) Peter Wright (6) 103.52	11
A2	(England) Michael Smith (4) 97.88	5

Final (best of 21 legs); 20 October
A1	(Netherlands) Michael van Gerwen (1) 100.87	11
B1	(Scotland) Peter Wright (6) 97.42	10
