= 2018 Champions League of Darts =

2018 Paddy Power Champions League of Darts

Tournament information
- Dates: 22–23 September 2018
- Venue: Brighton Centre
- Location: Brighton, England
- Organisation(s): Professional Darts Corporation (PDC)
- Format: Legs
- Prize fund: £250,000
- Winner's share: £100,000
- High checkout: 160 Gary Anderson

Champion(s)
- Gary Anderson (SCO)

The 2018 Paddy Power Champions League of Darts was the 3rd annual staging of the tournament, organised by the Professional Darts Corporation. It took place from 22 to 23 September 2018 at the Brighton Centre, Brighton.

The defending champion Mensur Suljović lost 4–11 against Gary Anderson in the semi-final; a rematch of the 2017 final.

Anderson went on to win his first Champions League title by defeating compatriot Peter Wright 11–4 in the final. It was Anderson's 10th major title and 8th in the PDC. It was also Anderson's 3rd major title of the season after winning that year's UK Open and World Matchplay.

A notable moment was the walk-ons before the group match between Simon Whitlock and Peter Wright, where Wright's walk-on music, "Don't Stop the Party" by Pitbull, was played when Whitlock walked onto the stage, instead of his own track, "Down Under" by Men at Work. Whitlock performed Wright's renowned sidestep dance across the stage, causing much laughter on stage and in the crowd. Wright subsequently walked on to his own music, and the Pitbull track was played twice.

== Format ==
The eight qualifiers were split into two groups, playing each other once in a best of 19 legs match. The top two of each group then proceed to the semi-finals. Both semi-finals and the final were a best of 21 legs match.

== Prize money ==
Stage (number of players)		Prize money (Total: £250,000)
Winner	(1)	£100,000
Runner-up	(1)	£50,000
Semi-finalists	(2)	£25,000
Third in group stage	(2)	£15,000
Fourth in group stage	(2)	£10,000

== Qualifiers ==
The top 7 players on the PDC Order of Merit following the 2018 World Matchplay qualified. Reigning champion Mensur Suljović was given a guaranteed place in the tournament, as he is the defending champion. As Suljović was also one of the top 7 players, the eighth ranked player also qualified.

1. (Netherlands) Michael van Gerwen (semi-finals)
2. (Scotland) Peter Wright (runner-up)
3. (England) Rob Cross (group stage)
4. (Scotland) Gary Anderson (winner)
5. (Northern Ireland) Daryl Gurney (group stage)
6. (Austria) Mensur Suljović (semi-finals)
7. (Australia) Simon Whitlock (group stage)
8. (England) Dave Chisnall (group stage)

== Results ==
=== Group stage ===
All matches first-to-10 (best of 19 legs)

NB: P = Played; W = Won; L = Lost; LF = Legs for; LA = Legs against; +/− = Plus/minus record, in relation to legs; Avg = Three-dart average in group matches; Pts = Group points

=== Group A ===
Pos.	Player	P	W	L	LF	LA	+/–	Avg	Pts
1	(Netherlands) Michael van Gerwen (1)	3	2	1	29	19	+10	102.89	4
2	(Scotland) Gary Anderson (4)	3	2	1	28	22	+6	99.64	4
3	(Northern Ireland) Daryl Gurney (5)	3	2	1	27	25	+2	94.33	4
4	(England) Dave Chisnall (8)	3	0	3	12	30	–18	93.53	0

22 September

101.48 (4) Gary Anderson (Scotland)	8 – 10	(5) (Northern Ireland) Daryl Gurney 95.28
111.23 (1) Michael van Gerwen (Netherlands)	10 – 2	(8) (England) Dave Chisnall 94.51

22 September

99.79 (4) Gary Anderson (Scotland)	10 – 3	(8) (England) Dave Chisnall 87.99
100.17 (1) Michael van Gerwen (Netherlands)	10 – 7	(5) (Northern Ireland) Daryl Gurney 91.21

23 September

96.45 (5) Daryl Gurney (Northern Ireland)	10 – 7	(8) (England) Dave Chisnall 97.08
100.05 (1) Michael van Gerwen (Netherlands)	9 – 10	(4) (Scotland) Gary Anderson 97.65

=== Group B ===
Pos.	Player	P	W	L	LF	LA	+/–	Avg	Pts
1	(Austria) Mensur Suljović (6)	3	3	0	30	16	+14	100.61	6
2	(Scotland) Peter Wright (2)	3	2	1	27	20	+7	101.71	4
3	(England) Rob Cross (3)	3	1	2	21	28	−7	92.06	2
4	(Australia) Simon Whitlock (7)	3	0	3	16	30	–14	92.54	0

22 September

91.79 (3) Rob Cross (England)	8 – 10	(6) (Austria) Mensur Suljović 96.46
101.22 (2) Peter Wright (Scotland)	10 – 7	(7) (Australia) Simon Whitlock 96.41

22 September

94.03 (3) Rob Cross (England)	10 – 8	(7) (Australia) Simon Whitlock 89.83
102.13 (2) Peter Wright (Scotland)	7 – 10	(6) (Austria) Mensur Suljović 105.53

23 September

99.81 (6) Mensur Suljović (Austria)	10 – 1	(7) (Australia) Simon Whitlock 91.00
101.77 (2) Peter Wright (Scotland)	10 – 3	(3) (England) Rob Cross 89.70

=== Knockout stage ===
Semi-finals (best of 21 legs); 23 September
A1	(Netherlands) Michael van Gerwen (1) 100.89	9
B2	(Scotland) Peter Wright (2) 101.46	11
B1	(Austria) Mensur Suljović (6) 92.01	4
A2	(Scotland) Gary Anderson (4) 102.26	11

Final (best of 21 legs); 23 September
B2	(Scotland) Peter Wright (2) 93.85	4
A2	(Scotland) Gary Anderson (4) 101.47	11
