= Peter Wright (darts player) =

Scottish darts player (born 1970)

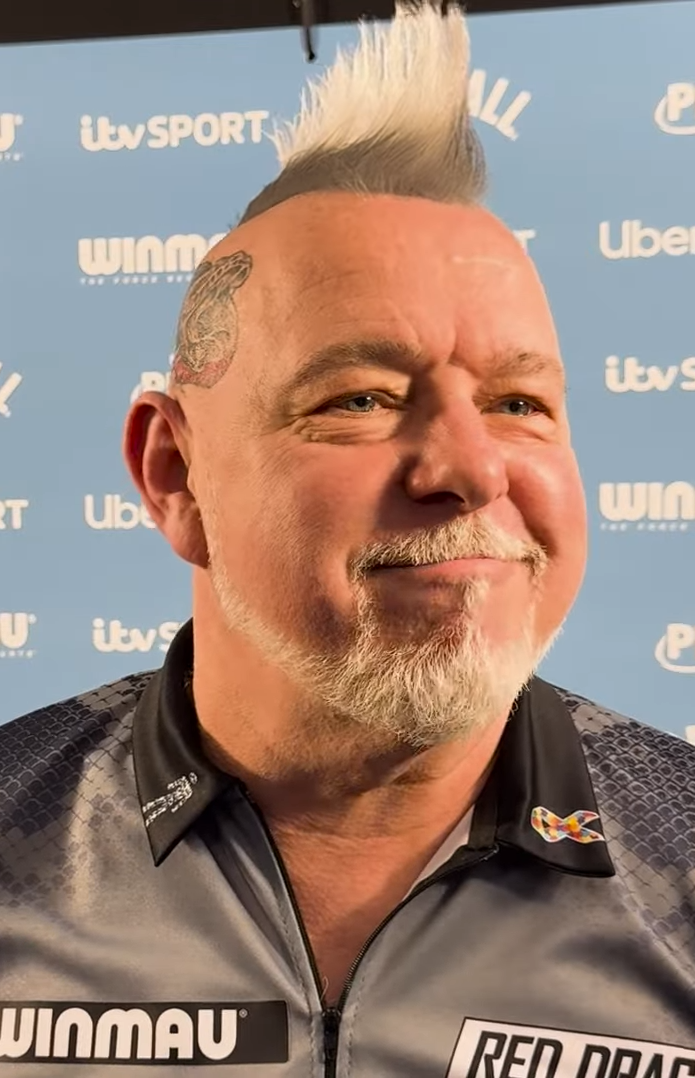
- Wright at the 2025 World Masters

Personal information
- Full name: Peter Stuart Wright
- Nickname: "Snakebite"
- Born: 10 March 1970 (age 56) Livingston, West Lothian, Scotland
- Home town: Mendham, Suffolk, England

Sport
- Sport: Darts
- Darts: 21g Red Dragon Signature
- Laterality: Right-handed
- Walk-on music: "Don't Stop The Party" by Pitbull

Organisation (see split in darts)
- BDO: 1995–2004
- PDC: 2004–present (Tour Card: 2011–present)
- Current world ranking: (PDC) 35 (5 November 2026)

WDF major events – best performances
- World Championship: Last 32: 1995
- World Masters: Last 64: 2001

PDC premier events – best performances
- World Championship: Winner (2): 2020, 2022
- World Matchplay: Winner (1): 2021
- World Grand Prix: Runner-up: 2018
- UK Open: Winner (1): 2017
- Grand Slam: Runner-up: 2017, 2019, 2021
- European Championship: Winner (2): 2020, 2023
- Premier League: Runner-up: 2017
- Desert Classic: Last 32: 2009
- PC Finals: Winner (1): 2021
- Masters: Winner (1): 2020
- Champions League: Runner-up: 2018, 2019
- World Series Finals: Runner-up: 2015, 2016

Other tournament wins
- Years
World Cup of Darts (Team event)	2019, 2021
European Tour Events (×9)
Czech Darts Open	2023
European Darts Grand Prix	2017
European Darts Open	2014, 2017
German Darts Championship	2017, 2024
German Darts Open	2017, 2022
International Darts Open	2017
Players Championships (×22)
2012, 2013, 2014, 2015 (×3), 2016, 2017, 2018 (×2), 2019 (×3), 2020 (×4), 2021 (×4), 2022
UK Open Qualifiers (×3)
2017 (×3)
World Series of Darts (×4)
German Darts Masters	2017, 2019
Melbourne Darts Masters	2018
Nordic Darts Masters	2023

Other achievements
- 2014, 2020 PDPA Player of the Year.; 2022 PDC Player of the Year.

Peter Stuart Wright (born 10 March 1970) is a Scottish professional darts player who competes in Professional Darts Corporation (PDC) events, where he was ranked world number one on two occasions in 2022. Nicknamed "Snakebite", he is a two-time PDC World Champion, having won the 2020 and 2022 World Championships. He also won the 2021 World Matchplay. Widely regarded as one of the greatest players in the history of the sport, Wright has won eight PDC major singles titles, placing him joint-fifth in the all-time list.

When he was 24, Wright qualified for the first round of the 1995 BDO World Championship but then stopped playing darts professionally, working instead as a builder and tyre fitter while competing in local darts leagues. He resumed his professional darts career in his late thirties, playing his first full schedule of PDC events in 2008. He qualified for his first PDC World Championship in 2010, entered the top 16 for the first time in 2013, and reached his first world final in 2014, in which he was runner-up to Michael van Gerwen. He won his first major PDC title at the 2017 UK Open. He has hit one televised nine-dart finish, at the 2020 Premier League Darts. Wright has won a total of 48 PDC titles in his professional career, including nine PDC European Tour titles.

Wright is known for his flamboyant stage persona, involving colourful attire, multicoloured Mohican hairstyles created by his hairdresser wife Joanne, and elaborate designs painted on his head. He is also known for performing a sidestep dance before his matches.

== Early life, BDO, and beginnings of PDC career ==
Wright was born in Livingston, Scotland, to a 16-year-old single mother; he has never met his father, who was in prison at the time of his birth. When he was three years old, his mother moved to London with her son because she feared that her sisters would take him away from her. Wright has lived in England since that time, but chooses to represent Scotland in sports. He first became interested in darts while watching players such as Cliff Lazarenko, Jocky Wilson, and Eric Bristow on television in the early 1980s. He received a set of darts for his 13th birthday, but since his mother could not afford a dartboard, he initially threw them at trees. After some practice, he was able to beat his stepfather and his stepfather's friends. Within a few years, he was regarded as one of the most promising young players in London.

Wright competed at the 1995 BDO World Darts Championship, losing 3–1 in the first round to eventual champion Richie Burnett. He did not pursue a professional career afterward; instead, he worked as a builder and tyre fitter while playing in local darts leagues. He competed in the 2005 UK Open, where he lost 5–4 in the third round to Dave Smith. After he and his wife Joanne watched the inaugural Grand Slam of Darts on TV in 2007, Wright mentioned that he had beaten some of the players who were competing in the event. Joanne then encouraged him to pursue professional success in the sport. He first played a full schedule of Professional Darts Corporation events in 2008, although he had little success, winning just £1,200 in prize money.

== PDC career ==
=== 2009–2010 ===
2009 proved to be a much better year for Wright as he made his PDC televised debut at the 2009 Las Vegas Desert Classic where he was defeated 6–3 by Colin Lloyd in the first round. His good form on the PDC Pro Tour, helped by a semi-final showing in the Las Vegas Players Championship, earned him qualification for the 2009 World Matchplay. Wright played Terry Jenkins in the first round and lost 10–4. Further quarter-final and semi-final runs followed in Players Championship events to qualify for his first PDC World Championship, where he lost 3–1 in sets to Michael van Gerwen in the opening round.

In 2010, Wright also made his debut in the Players Championship Finals and lost in the first round 6–2 against Wes Newton. In April, he reached his first final on the PDC tour at the sixth UK Open Qualifier where he lost 6–2 to Phil Taylor. Wright was knocked out in the third round of the UK Open 9–7 by William O'Connor.

=== 2011 season ===
Wright won a match at the World Championship for the first time in 2011 by beating Co Stompé 3–1 and then saw off Paul Nicholson to face defending champion Phil Taylor in the third round. Wright lost 4–1 and averaged a very respectable 96.56. He enjoyed a good run at the UK Open which was ended in the last 16 by Mark Hylton and played in his second World Matchplay where Simon Whitlock beat him 10–7 in the first round. Wright's first quarter-final appearance in a major event came at the European Championship with victories over John Part and Gary Anderson, before losing again to Whitlock this time 10–6. His form continued by reaching the final of the 18th Players Championship of the year and a 6–2 loss to Anderson. Wright defeated Denis Ovens 6–4 in the opening round of the Players Championship Finals but lost 8–6 to Wes Newton in the subsequent round.

=== 2012 season ===
Wright was unable to repeat his 2011 run in the 2012 edition of the World Championship, as he lost 3–1 to Jelle Klaasen in the first round. Wright missed 11 consecutive darts at doubles in the first two sets of the match. Wright represented Scotland with Gary Anderson in the 2012 PDC World Cup of Darts and together they were beaten by South Africa in the second round, losing in a sudden-death leg. Wright defeated Andy Brown and former world champions John Part and Richie Burnett to reach the last 16 of the UK Open where he played Raymond van Barneveld. Wright led 8–6 and was on a 138 finish on his throw to advance to the quarter-finals and beat the Dutchman for the first time. He hit treble 20 with his first dart and then single 18 to leave 60, meaning single 20 with his last dart would have left double top for the win when he returned to the board. However, Wright hit another treble 20 to bust his score and went on to lose the match 9–8.

Wright won his first PDC ranking title in October 2012, at the 15th Players Championship of the year in Killarney, Ireland, where he beat Robert Thornton 6–1 in the final with a 107 average. After all 33 ProTour events of 2012 had been played, Wright was 17th on the Order of Merit, comfortably inside the top 32 who qualified for the Players Championship Finals. He beat Colin Lloyd and Wayne Jones, before losing to Kim Huybrechts 10–6 in the quarter-finals.

=== 2013 season ===
At the 2013 World Championship Wright saw off Arron Monk 3–0 in the first round to set up a meeting with the second favourite for the tournament, Michael van Gerwen, who Wright described as "not good enough" before the match. Wright won the first two sets, but van Gerwen won 12 of the next 14 legs to triumph 4–2. In the eight UK Open Qualifiers during the early part of 2013, Wright was a losing quarter-finalist twice and a losing semi-finalist three times to be placed fourth on the Order of Merit. It was at the UK Open where Wright reached his first major PDC semi-final. He had impressive victories over Gaz Cousins (9–4), BDO number one Stephen Bunting (9–2), Steve West (9–4) and Adrian Lewis (10–6). He played Phil Taylor in the semis and was beaten 5–10, with Wright stating afterwards that he had played the player instead of the dart board and was tensing up and snatching darts. He set himself a goal of reaching the top 16 in the world rankings by the end of the year. Later in the month, Wright won his second career ranking title at the fifth Players Championship. He averaged an incredible 118.66 in beating Gary Anderson 6–0 in ten minutes in the quarter-finals and then saw off Kevin Painter 6–3 in the semis and Wes Newton 6–1 in the final. He lost 6–4 to Colin Lloyd in the first round of the European Championship and 13–3 to Michael van Gerwen in the second round of the World Matchplay. Wright reached the final of the German Darts Championship, but lost 6–2 to Dave Chisnall. He also lost to Chisnall in the final of the next event, the seventh Players Championship, having beaten van Gerwen 6–2 in the semi-finals. He picked up another appearance in a final at the tenth event but lost 6–3 to Raymond van Barneveld. At the World Grand Prix he lost 2–0 in sets to Wes Newton in the first round, but after the event he moved into the world's top 16 for the first time. This earned him a spot in the first staging of the Masters, a tournament exclusively for the top 16 on the Order of Merit, where he was defeated 6–2 by Van Gerwen in the opening round.

=== 2014 season ===
Wright advanced to the third round of the 2014 World Championship, where he faced Michael Smith who had knocked out Phil Taylor in the previous round. Wright produced his then highest televised averaged of 105.07 but at one point was 3–2 behind, before winning six of the next seven legs to reach the quarter-finals of the event for the first time in his career. He trailed 2–0 early on against Wes Newton but rallied to level with the match eventually going into a deciding set. Wright missed four match darts at two legs to none up but eventually edged the contest with a 121 finish on the bull to face Simon Whitlock in the semi-finals. He outplayed Whitlock from the start and maintained his high level by averaging over 100 for the second time in the event and win 6–2. Wright lost 12 of the first 14 legs in the final against number two seed Michael van Gerwen, before winning two unanswered sets and then missed one dart to trail just 4–3. He went on to be 6–2 behind and again won two sets in a row, but missed two chances to extend the match into a 12th set as he was beaten 7–4. The runner-up's cheque of £100,000 was the highest of his career at that point and he rose to world number seven. He was named the Most Improved Player and PDPA Player of the Year at the PDC's Annual Awards in January.

Wright's exploits earned him a place in the Premier League for the first time and he started the campaign very strongly with victories over the likes of Taylor (7–4), Adrian Lewis (7–1) and Whitlock (7–3) to be top of the table between weeks four and six. Despite three defeats in a row in the middle of the season, Wright was in the play-off places until week 13 and he then battled to a 6–6 draw with Taylor to ensure he would have a chance of progressing in the final round of league matches. However, after other results had not gone his way he was guaranteed to finish fifth in the table before he had played and he ended the season with a 7–5 defeat against Van Gerwen. Wright won his third title carrying ranking points of his career at the ninth Players Championship by beating Justin Pipe 6–2. At the Dubai Duty Free Darts Masters, Wright eliminated Taylor 10–5 and Dave Chisnall 11–8 to reach the final, where Van Gerwen was once again the victor as he defeated Wright 11–7. Wright played in his second World Cup of Darts this year and first with Robert Thornton and they progressed to the quarter-finals where they played Northern Ireland's Brendan Dolan and Mickey Mansell. Wright lost his singles match 4–2 to Dolan, but Thornton saw off Mansell to send the tie into a deciding doubles game which Scotland lost 4–1. At the European Darts Open, Wright averaged 111.29 whilst beating Michael Smith 6–1 in the second round and he went on to reach the final where he won his first European Tour title by defeating Simon Whitlock 6–2. He also advanced to the final of the last Players Championship of the year, but lost 6–5 to Gary Anderson.

=== 2015 season ===
Wright had a largely trouble free passage into the quarter-finals of the 2015 World Championship as he dropped just one set in his opening three games. However, he was second best against Gary Anderson in a 5–1 defeat. A 9–1 victory over Raymond van Barneveld at the UK Open marked Wright's first ever win over the Dutchman with Wright going on to meet Phil Taylor in the quarter-finals. Wright won 10–6 after producing a match defining run to go from 5–4 behind to 9–5 ahead and broke down in tears in the post match interview. He recomposed himself to thrash Stephen Bunting 10–0 with an average of 105.10, over 20 points higher than his opponent's. However, a victory over a fifth world champion in the tournament proved a step too far as he couldn't quite reach the same heights in the final against Michael van Gerwen in an 11–5 defeat. A week later, Wright lost 6–5 to James Wade in the final of the second Players Championship event. On his return to Scotland, Wright recovered from 5–1 down to steal a point against Stephen Bunting in the Premier League, stretching his run to five matches unbeaten. However, four of those games were draws and Wright went into the ninth week of fixtures needing a win over Adrian Lewis to avoid being relegated from the competition, but he was beaten 7–4. Wright threw the first nine-dart finish of his career during his run to the final of the seventh Players Championship and won the title by defeating Wade 6–5 with an average of 110.14. He also won the 12th event by overcoming Jelle Klaasen 6–1 in the final. Wright and Anderson beat the Dutch duo of Van Gerwen and Van Barneveld in a doubles match in the semi-finals of the World Cup to ensure Scotland would reach their first final in the event. They played England's Taylor and Lewis and it went to the final singles game in which the winner of Wright against Lewis would win the title, with Lewis triumphing 4–1. In the inaugural Japan Darts Masters, Wright advanced to the final by edging past Van Gerwen 8–7 with a 141 finish. He was 7–2 down to Taylor, but then produced three ton-plus finishes during a five leg burst to level the match. However, Taylor was first to a double in the deciding leg to inflict Wright's fourth defeat in a televised final.

Wright reset his highest televised average to 108.13 whilst eliminating Kim Huybrechts 10–5 in the opening round of the World Matchplay. A pair of straight forward wins over Andrew Gilding and Gerwyn Price saw him reach the semi-finals of the event for the first time, but he lost 17–12 to Van Gerwen. Terry Jenkins defeated Wright 6–4 in the final of the 15th Players Championship. He led Kim Huybrechts 5–2 in the final of the European Darts Grand Prix, before losing four successive legs to be defeated 6–5, missing one championship dart in the process. Wright won his third Players Championship title of the year by edging Benito van de Pas 6–5 with all 11 legs going with the throw. He lost each of the first five legs to Van Gerwen in the semi-finals of the European Championship, but then pulled it back to 8–7 behind. However, Wright missed two darts at a single number to set up a double to level and went on to lose 11–7. The pair would meet once more in the final of the first World Series of Darts Finals and this time Wright lost the game's opening four legs, before moving 5–4 up. At 10–9 ahead and one leg away from the title, Wright hit a 180 to leave 90 only for Van Gerwen to take out 129 on the bull and, after Wright was unable to checkout 121 in the final leg, Van Gerwen finished 50 to complete an 11 dart leg and deny Wright his first televised title.

=== 2016 season ===
Wright did not drop a set in reaching the third round of the 2016 World Championship and survived one match dart from Dave Chisnall to win 4–3. He missed one dart against Adrian Lewis to reduce his deficit to 4–3 in the quarter-finals and lost 5–2. Wright reached the final of the UK Open for the second year in a row and just like 12 months previously he faced Michael van Gerwen. He stayed with Van Gerwen early on by only trailing 5–3 and missed a dart for a nine-dart finish, but Wright would ultimately lose 11–4. A week later Wright won the first Players Championship of 2016 by recovering from 5–3 down to Lewis to triumph 6–5. At the end of March, Wright reached the final of the German Darts Masters losing 6–4 to Van Gerwen.

Wright missed out on a Premier League finals spot by two points. A subsequent fallout on social media between Wright's wife Jo, Adrian Lewis and members of the management team of Gary Anderson led Wright to withdraw from the Scottish World Cup of Darts team, for whom he had represented in the previous years final, and was replaced by Robert Thornton. Wright returned to PDC major televised action by reaching the quarter-finals of the World Matchplay after impressive 10–5 and 11–6 wins over Joe Cullen and Ian White respectively, before losing narrowly 16–14 to Lewis. He was edged out 6–5 by Van Gerwen in the final of the European Darts Open and the pair met in a European Tour final for the third time this year at the European Darts Grand Prix, with the world number one triumphing once again this time 6–2. Wright lost 2–0 to Brendan Dolan in the first round of the World Grand Prix, but reached the semi-finals of the European Championship and was ousted 11–8 by Mensur Suljović.

From 10–8 up in the semi-finals of the World Series of Darts Finals, Phil Taylor missed a total of seven match darts as Wright sneaked through to his seventh televised final and second in a row in this event 11–10. Once again Van Gerwen waited and Wright rallied from 10–6 to trail 10–9, but then missed five chances to level the game and was beaten 11–9. It was a similar story at the Grand Slam as Wright went 5–0 up on Taylor in the quarter-finals and knocked him out 16–10, missing a dart at double 12 for a nine darter along the way. In the semi-finals he lost to Van Gerwen for the 16th time in a row as the Dutchman averaged 111.17 to Wright's 102.13 in a 16–10 win. However, Wright, who so often changes his darts, stated that he had found a set he would be finally be staying with. Another semi-final exit followed at the Players Championship Finals as Dave Chisnall beat him 11–8.

=== 2017 season: First major title ===
Wright averaged over 100 in each of his three matches at the 2017 World Championship leading up to a quarter-final meeting with James Wade in which he averaged even higher at 104.79. He closed out the match with a 134 finish to win 5–3 and move on to a semi-final against Gary Anderson. Wright battled to 3–3 having trailed 3–1, but lost nine of the final ten legs to be defeated 6–3. His current world ranking of three is the highest he has ever been. Wright won the first UK Open Qualifier of the year by beating Adrian Lewis 6–4 in the final and took the third event with a 6–5 win over Michael Smith in the final. He made it three wins out of six events by defeating James Wade 6–3 in the final of the last qualifier to top the UK Open rankings.

Wright produced the second highest televised three-dart average of all-time of 119.50 in a 7–2 victory over Lewis in the fifth week of the Premier League. At the end of the same week he played in the UK Open, where he was the bookmakers' pre-tournament favourite due to his strong form and the absence of an injured van Gerwen. He defeated James Richardson, Dave Chisnall, and Rob Cross in the first two days of the tournament. From the quarter-final stage he beat Raymond van Barneveld 10–8 (with an average of 110.88) and Daryl Gurney 11–5 to play in the final of the event for the third year in a row. Wright raced into a 7–2 lead over Gerwyn Price and held on to claim his first major title with an 11–6 win. Wright won the German Darts Championship by overcoming Van Gerwen 6–3 in the final. It was his first victory over the world number one in a final after Wright had lost 10 in a row. He also added the German Darts Open to his growing collection of tournament wins after edging out Benito van de Pas 6–5 in the final by taking out a 121 finish with his opponent waiting on seven. He quickly made it a hat-trick of European Tour tournament wins this year when he whitewashed Van Gerwen 6–0 in the final of the European Darts Grand Prix.

Wright came close to topping the Premier League table as he finished a point behind Van Gerwen. Nevertheless, he qualified for the play-offs for the first time and was 4–0 ahead of Taylor in the semi-finals. Wright still had to rely on Taylor missing darts at doubles including one to win the match and edged through 10–9. He also had a fast start in the final to be 7–2 up on Van Gerwen, before being pegged back to 8–8. At 10–9 Wright was one leg away from winning. He left 32 after nine darts, before missing six darts for the title. Wright still had the throw in the next leg, but Van Gerwen had a 12-dart leg to break and win 11–10. Despite this disappointment, two days later Wright won the 11th Players Championship by overcoming Daryl Gurney 6–3. Wright and Gary Anderson suffered a surprise first round 5–2 defeat to Singapore at the World Cup.

Wright reached the finals of the 2017 World Matchplay and the 2017 Grand Slam of Darts losing to Phil Taylor and Michael van Gerwen respectively. He won his first title on the World Series of Darts at the 2017 German Darts Masters, beating Taylor 11–4 in the final.

=== 2018 season ===
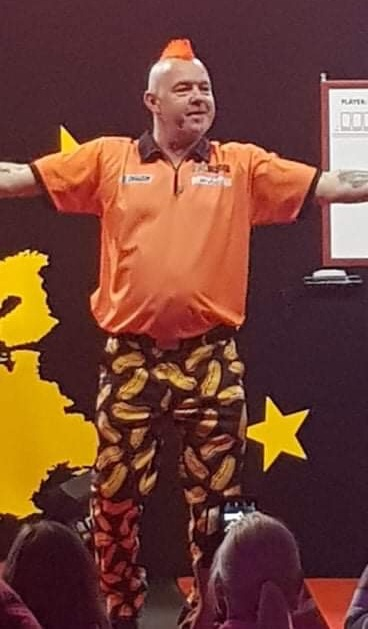
Wright at the 2018 Dutch Darts Championship

Wright had an early exit in the 2018 World Championship, losing to Jamie Lewis in the second round. He only finished 7th in the 2018 Premier League Darts, but turned his season round by reaching the final of the 2018 PDC World Cup of Darts, alongside Gary Anderson, losing to the Netherlands team.

Wright followed his World Cup final appearance with a semi-final place at the 2018 World Matchplay and a win at the 2018 Melbourne Darts Masters. He also reached the finals of the 2018 World Grand Prix and the 2018 Champions League of Darts, losing to Michael van Gerwen and Gary Anderson respectively.

=== 2019 season: World Cup Champion ===
At the 2019 World Championship, Wright again suffered an early exit, losing 3–1 to Spaniard Toni Alcinas in the second round. He finished the 2019 Premier League Darts season in 8th, only beating Raymond van Barneveld and contender Steve Lennon over the season. The Scotland team of Wright and Gary Anderson won the 2019 PDC World Cup of Darts, beating Ireland in the final. Wright subsequently won the 2019 German Darts Masters, beating Gabriel Clemens in the final.

Wright made the final of the 2019 Champions League of Darts, and at one point led the first-of-eleven match against Michael van Gerwen 10–7, but he missed three match darts and allowed Van Gerwen to win 11–10. Wright also made the final of the 2019 Grand Slam of Darts, losing 16–6 to reigning champion Gerwyn Price.

=== 2020 season: World, Masters and European Champion ===
At the 2020 World Championship Wright survived a match dart at bullseye to win a sudden-death leg against Noel Malicdem in the second round, before beating Seigo Asada and Jeffrey de Zwaan to reach the quarter-finals, where he triumphed 5–3 over Luke Humphries to reach the semi-final for the first time since the 2017 tournament. In a bad-tempered affair, Wright defeated Gerwyn Price 6–3 in the semi-final and defeated Michael van Gerwen 7–3 in the final to become the 2020 World Darts Champion at the age of 49. On 2 February Wright beat Michael Smith 11–10 to win his first Masters title. In November, Wright won his 4th major by beating James Wade 11–4 in the final of the European Championship. Wright had a poor showing at the Grand Slam, failing to progress from the group stage after a 2–5 loss to Devon Petersen in his final match, later stating "When I lost to Devon I could have walked away from the sport quite easily." Wright had better luck the following week with a run to the semi-finals of the Players Championship Finals making him just the third player in history (after Michael van Gerwen and Phil Taylor) to exceed £1,000,000 on the PDC Order of Merit.

=== 2021 season: World Matchplay Champion and Players Championship Finals winner ===
Wright kicked off the defence of his world title by beating Steve West in his opening match of the 2021 World Championship, dressed in a Grinch costume. His reign as world champion came to an end in the third round, when he was defeated 4–3 by Gabriel Clemens.

In July, Wright won the World Matchplay title for the first time with a dominance performance whereby he won all five of his matches by a minimum of six legs and averaged over 100 throughout. He defeated Danny Noppert, Joe Cullen, Michael Smith, Michael van Gerwen and finally defending champion Dimitri van den Bergh. He followed this up with a second world cup win for Scotland, this time partnering John Henderson. A dry period including a first round loss to Rob Cross at the Grand Prix ended with a third Grand Slam of Darts final, beating Jose de Sousa, Fallon Sherrock and Michael Smith in the knockout rounds (the latter being a 16–12 win from 8–12 behind) before once again losing to Gerwyn Price. The following week, Wright won his first Players Championship Finals title, following comfortable wins over van Gerwen and Jonny Clayton with a deciding leg victory over Ryan Searle in the final. This completed Wright's set of reaching the final of every active PDC major and was his fifth win in two years.

=== 2022 season: Second World Championship, World Number 1 ===
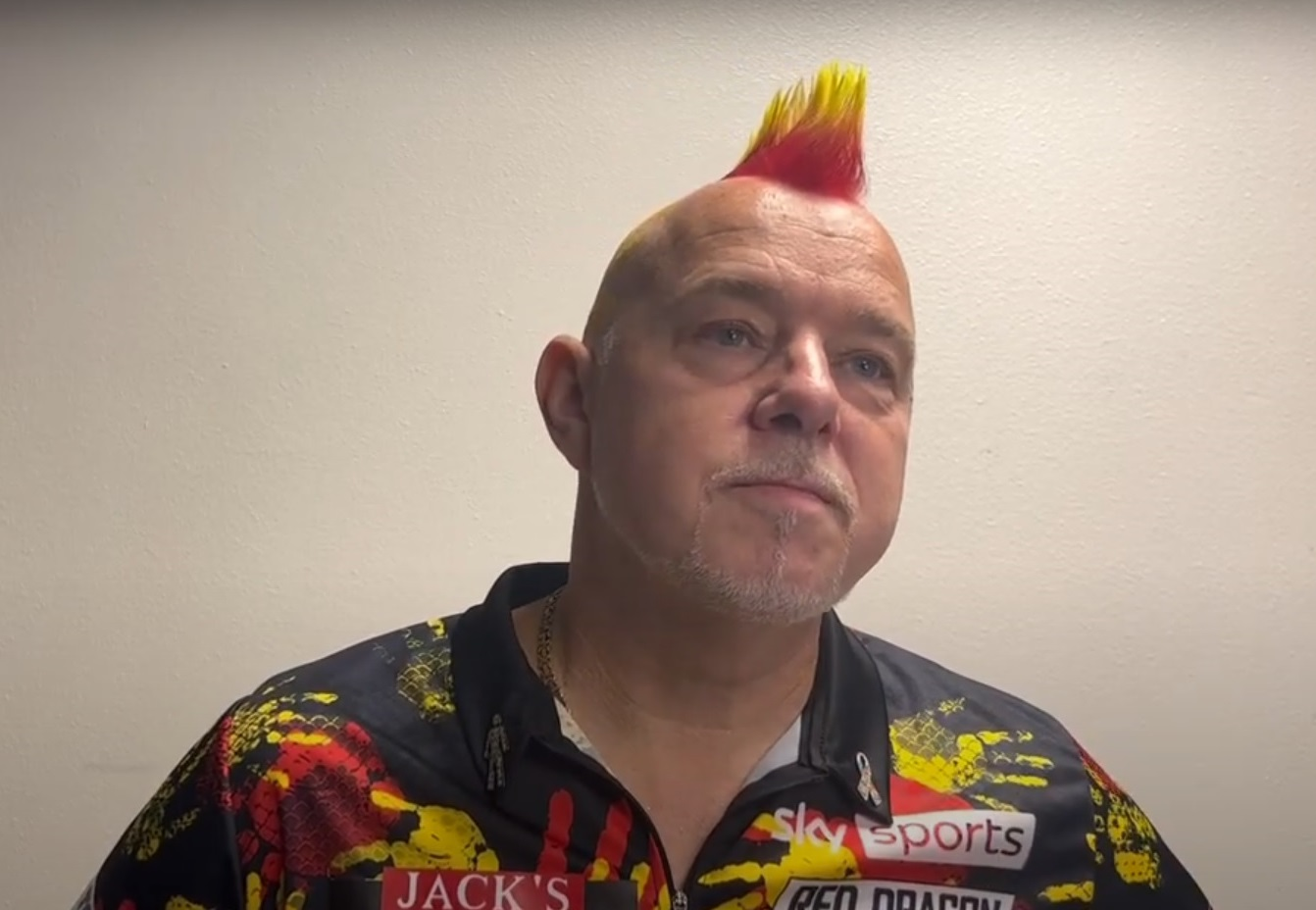
Wright in 2022

Wright started his 2022 World Championship campaign with a convincing 3–0 win against Ryan Meikle, before fighting back from 2–0 down to defeat Damon Heta 4–2 in the third round. He next beat Ryan Searle 4–1, before coming back from 4–3 down to beat Callan Rydz in extra legs to make the semi-final. There he beat Gary Anderson 6–4 to reach the final for the third time in his career. Wright defeated Michael Smith 7–5 in the final to win his second world title.

In the Masters, Wright suffered an early exit, losing 10–8 to Simon Whitlock in the round of 16. In the UK Open, he defeated Joe Cullen 10–6 in the fourth round before beating Simon Whitlock 10–5. However, his tournament came to an end after losing 10–7 to William O'Connor after many missed doubles. On the 7th of March, Wright became the PDC World Number 1 for the first time, becoming the 11th player to do so and the oldest ever first time world number 1 at 51 years old. In the Premier League, Wright finished 5th in the league table, meaning he did not qualify for the play-offs after only winning 1 night in the league stage. In the World Cup of Darts, alongside John Henderson, the pair defeated Hong Kong 5–1 in the opening round, before overcoming Portugal 2–0 in the round of 16, with Wright himself scraping past José de Sousa 4–3 to secure the victory, although Scotland would go on to lose 2–0 to England in the quarter-finals, with Wright himself losing 4–1 to James Wade.

Following the conclusion of the Grand Slam of Darts, Wright withdrew from the Players Championship Finals in order to be with his wife who was receiving treatment after a gallbladder operation.

=== 2023: Second European Championship title ===
At the 2023 World Championship, Wright opened his world title defence with a 3–0 win over Mickey Mansell. His reign ended when he lost 4–1 to Kim Huybrechts in the third round.

Wright won his first title of the year at the Nordic Darts Masters, beating Gerwyn Price in the final 11–5. He won his first ranking title of the year at the Czech Darts Open in May, where he defeated Dave Chisnall 8–6 in the final. In the 2023 Premier League, he failed to win a night over the course of sixteen weeks and finished bottom of the league table. Wright and Gary Anderson, representing Scotland, reached the final of the 2023 World Cup of Darts but lost to the Wales 10–2.

At the 2023 European Championship, Wright reached the final following an 11–8 win over Danny Noppert. He won his second European Championship by beating James Wade 11–6.

=== 2024 ===
At the 2024 World Championship, Wright suffered a shock 3–0 second round loss to Jim Williams. In the 2024 Premier League, Wright only won two matches for the entire season and finished bottom of the league table. He won the German Darts Championship after a surprise 8–5 victory over Luke Littler in the final, in which Wright won six consecutive legs to win the match.

=== 2025 ===
At the 2025 World Championship, Wright reached the quarter-finals. In the lead-up to his fourth-round tie against reigning world champion Luke Humphries, Wright vowed to beat tournament favourites Humphries and Luke Littler, and said he was not ready to listen to calls for him to retire. Wright defeated Humphries 4–1 after winning the last three sets, eliminating the defending champion. In his quarter-final match, he lost to Stephen Bunting 5–2.

For the first time since the 2013 event, Wright was not selected in the 2025 Premier League Darts lineup. He reached the final of Players Championship 11 in April, losing 8–3 to Cameron Menzies. Wright failed to qualify for the Grand Slam of Darts for the first time since 2012 after losing 5–0 to Connor Scutt in the PDC Tour Card holder qualifying event.

=== 2026 ===
At the 2026 World Championship, Wright won his first-round match 3–0 against Noa-Lynn van Leuven. He exited the tournament after losing 3–0 to German qualifier Arno Merk. In February 2026, Wright fell out of the world's top 32 for the first time since 2011.

== Style and stage persona ==
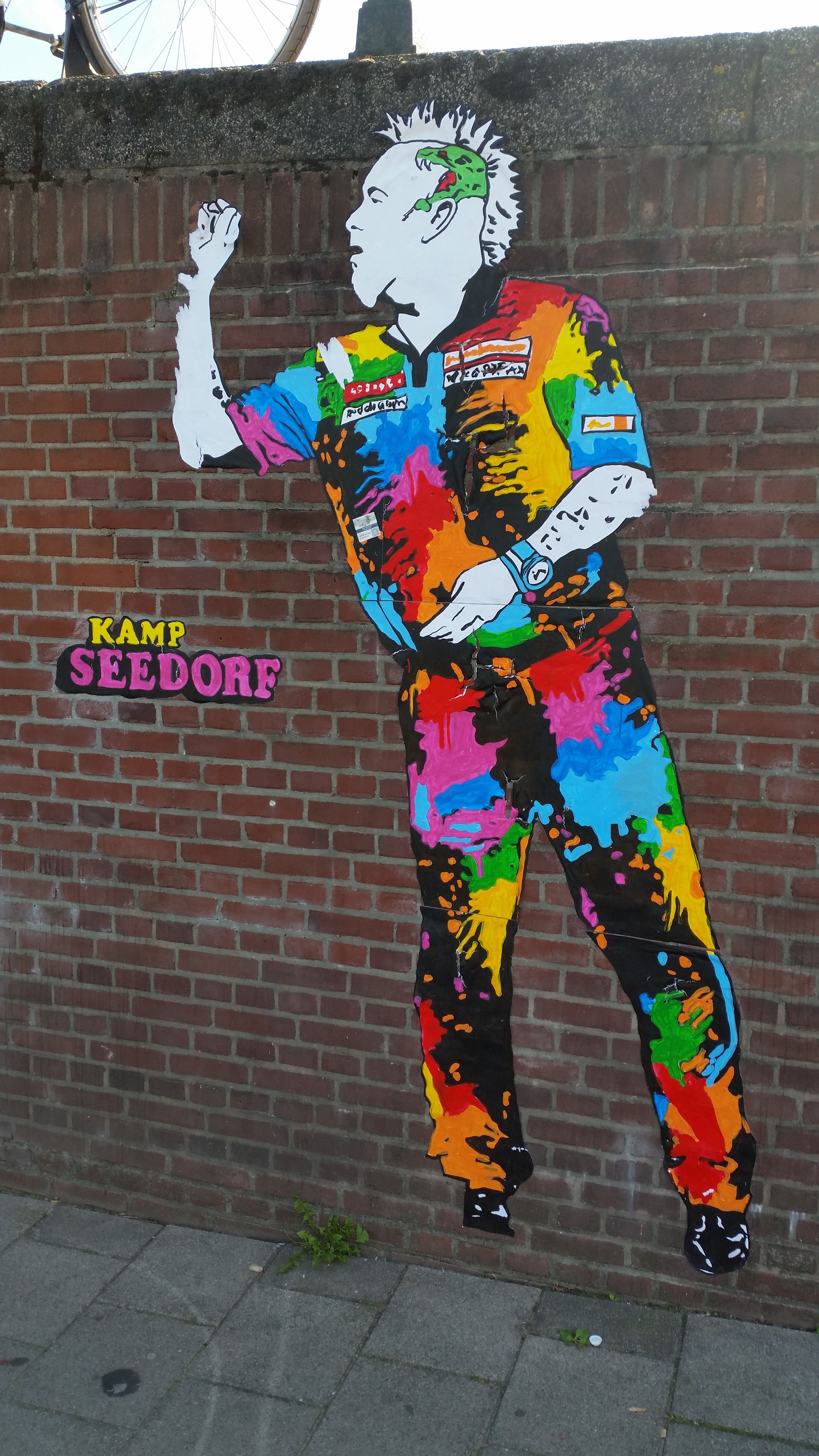
A mural of Wright by Kamp Seedorf, featuring his signature Mohican hairstyle, snake tattoo and colourful shirt

Wright has become known for his colourful Mohican hairstyle and extravagant clothing, which change between every round of his tournaments. His hair takes two hours to complete and is done by his hairdresser wife Joanne and inspired by their daughter. He usually has a snake painted on to the side of his head, which many believed was reference to his favourite drink, the snakebite, which is also his nickname. However, he is actually called Snakebite due to his love of snakes, stating in an interview after his first World Championship win, "I just like snakes. I'm a bit like a snake – I'm a quiet person who likes to be left alone. If you keep poking me, I'll bite you," he said.

Wright equates his look to applying war paint before going into battle, as he is naturally shy away from the oche. In the past, he has used specially designed darts which changed colour depending on the light. Wright is known to regularly try different sets of darts as he tweaks the weight, flights and stems. He did so between every round when he reached the 2014 World Championship final.

Wright performs a sidestep dance across the stage at the beginning of his matches.

== World Championship performances ==
=== BDO World Championship ===
- 1995: First round (lost to Richie Burnett 1–3)

=== PDC World Championship ===
- 2010: First round (lost to Michael van Gerwen 1–3)
- 2011: Third round (lost to Phil Taylor 1–4)
- 2012: First round (lost to Jelle Klaasen 1–3)
- 2013: Second round (lost to Michael van Gerwen 2–4)
- 2014: Runner-up (lost to Michael van Gerwen 4–7)
- 2015: Quarter-finals (lost to Gary Anderson 1–5)
- 2016: Quarter-finals (lost to Adrian Lewis 2–5)
- 2017: Semi-finals (lost to Gary Anderson 3–6)
- 2018: Second round (lost to Jamie Lewis 1–4)
- 2019: Second round (lost to Toni Alcinas 1–3)
- 2020: Winner (beat Michael van Gerwen 7–3)
- 2021: Third round (lost to Gabriel Clemens 3–4)
- 2022: Winner (beat Michael Smith 7–5)
- 2023: Third round (lost to Kim Huybrechts 1–4)
- 2024: Second round (lost to Jim Williams 0–3)
- 2025: Quarter-finals (lost to Stephen Bunting 2–5)
- 2026: Second round (lost to Arno Merk 0–3)

== Career finals ==
=== PDC major finals: 21 (8 titles) ===
Legend
World Championship (2–1)
World Matchplay (1–1)
World Grand Prix (0–1)
Grand Slam (0–3)
Premier League (0–1)
UK Open (1–2)
European Championship (2–0)
Players Championship Finals (1–0)
Masters (1–0)
Champions League (0–2)
World Series of Darts Finals (0–2)

Outcome	No.	Year	Championship	Opponent in the final	Score (Note: (l) = score in legs, (s) = score in sets, (m) = score in matches.)
Runner-up	1.	2014	World Championship	Michael van Gerwen	4–7 (s)
Runner-up	2.	2015	UK Open	Michael van Gerwen	5–11 (l)
Runner-up	3.	2015	World Series of Darts Finals	Michael van Gerwen	10–11 (l)
Runner-up	4.	2016	UK Open (2)	Michael van Gerwen	4–11 (l)
Runner-up	5.	2016	World Series of Darts Finals (2)	Michael van Gerwen	9–11 (l)
Winner	1.	2017	UK Open	Gerwyn Price	11–6 (l)
Runner-up	6.	2017	Premier League	Michael van Gerwen	10–11 (l)
Runner-up	7.	2017	World Matchplay	Phil Taylor	8–18 (l)
Runner-up	8.	2017	Grand Slam	Michael van Gerwen	12–16 (l)
Runner-up	9.	2018	Champions League	Gary Anderson	4–11 (l)
Runner-up	10.	2018	World Grand Prix	Michael van Gerwen	2–5 (s)
Runner-up	11.	2019	Champions League (2)	Michael van Gerwen	10–11 (l)
Runner-up	12.	2019	Grand Slam (2)	Gerwyn Price	6–16 (l)
Winner	2.	2020	World Championship	Michael van Gerwen	7–3 (s)
Winner	3.	2020	Masters	Michael Smith	11–10 (l)
Winner	4.	2020	European Championship	James Wade	11–4 (l)
Winner	5.	2021	World Matchplay	Dimitri Van den Bergh	18–9 (l)
Runner-up	13.	2021	Grand Slam (3)	Gerwyn Price	8–16 (l)
Winner	6.	2021	Players Championship Finals	Ryan Searle	11–10 (l)
Winner	7.	2022	World Championship (2)	Michael Smith	7–5 (s)
Winner	8.	2023	European Championship (2)	James Wade	11–6 (l)

=== PDC world series finals: 7 (4 titles) ===
Legend
World Series of Darts (4–3)

Outcome	No.	Year	Championship	Opponent in the final	Score
Runner-up	1.	2014	Dubai Darts Masters	Michael van Gerwen	7–11 (l)
Runner-up	2.	2015	Japan Darts Masters	Phil Taylor	7–8 (l)
Runner-up	3.	2017	Melbourne Darts Masters	Phil Taylor	8–11 (l)
Winner	1.	2017	German Darts Masters	Phil Taylor	11–4 (l)
Winner	2.	2018	Melbourne Darts Masters	Michael Smith	11–8 (l)
Winner	3.	2019	German Darts Masters (2)	Gabriel Clemens	8–6 (l)
Winner	4.	2023	Nordic Darts Masters	Gerwyn Price	11–5 (l)

=== PDC team finals: 5 (2 titles) ===
Outcome	No.	Year	Championship	Team	Teammate	Opponents in the final	Score
Runner-up	1.	2015	World Cup of Darts	Scotland	Gary Anderson	England – Phil Taylor and Adrian Lewis	2–3 (m)
Runner-up	2.	2018	World Cup of Darts (2)	Scotland	Gary Anderson	Netherlands – Michael van Gerwen and Raymond van Barneveld	1–3 (m)
Winner	1.	2019	World Cup of Darts	Scotland	Gary Anderson	Ireland – Steve Lennon and William O'Connor	3–1 (m)
Winner	2.	2021	World Cup of Darts (2)	Scotland	John Henderson	Austria – Mensur Suljović and Rowby-John Rodriguez	3–1 (m)
Runner-up	3.	2023	World Cup of Darts (3)	Scotland	Gary Anderson	Wales – Gerwyn Price and Jonny Clayton	2–10 (l)

== Performance timeline ==
=== BDO ===
Tournament	1995	2001
BDO Ranked televised events
World Championship	1R	DNQ
World Masters	1R	2R

=== PDC ===
Tournament	2005	2008	2009	2010	2011	2012	2013	2014	2015	2016	2017	2018	2019	2020	2021	2022	2023	2024	2025	2026
PDC Ranked televised events
World Championship	DNQ			1R	3R	1R	2R	F	QF	QF	SF	2R	2R	W	3R	W	3R	2R	QF	2R
World Masters (Note: A non-ranked event until 2025)	Not held						1R	1R	QF	QF	QF	QF	SF	W	SF	2R	SF	QF	2R	Prel.
UK Open	3R	DNQ	3R	3R	5R	5R	SF	4R	F	F	W	3R	4R	6R	4R	6R	6R	6R	4R	5R
World Matchplay	DNQ		1R	DNQ	1R	DNQ	2R	1R	SF	QF	F	SF	QF	2R	W	QF	2R	1R	1R	DNQ
World Grand Prix	DNQ				1R	DNQ	1R	2R	1R	1R	QF	F	2R	1R	1R	SF	QF	1R	1R	DNQ
European Championship	NH	Did not qualify			QF	DNQ	1R	QF	SF	SF	QF	2R	1R	W	1R	QF	W	1R	1R	DNQ
Grand Slam (Note: A non-ranked event until 2015)	NH	Did not qualify					RR	2R	2R	SF	F	2R	F	RR	F	RR	RR	RR	DNQ	
Players Championship Finals	Not held		DNQ	1R	2R	QF	2R	2R	2R	SF	1R	3R	1R	SF	W	WD	DNQ	1R	2R	DNQ
PDC Non-ranked televised events
Premier League	Did not participate							5th	9th	5th	F	7th	8th	SF	7th	5th	8th	8th	DNP	
Champions League	Not held									RR	RR	F	F	Not held						
World Cup	Not held			DNP	NH	2R	DNP	QF	F	DNP	1R	F	W	WD	W	QF	F	SF	2R	DNQ
World Series Finals	Not held								F	F	QF	2R	2R	SF	2R	2R	SF	SF	1R	DNQ
Past major events
Las Vegas Desert Classic	DNQ		1R	Not held																
Championship League	NH	Did not participate				RR	RR	Not held												
Career statistics
Year-end ranking	NR	171	50	33	29	26	7	5	4	3	2	3	7	2	2	2	8	12	31	

==== European Tour ====
Season	1	2	3	4	5	6	7	8	9	10	11	12	13	14	15
2012	ADO; 2R	GDC; 2R	EDO; 1R	GDM; 1R	DDM; 1R										
2013	UKM; 1R	EDT; 3R	EDO; SF	ADO; 2R	GDT; 3R	GDC; F	GDM; 3R	DDM; QF							
2014	GDC; 2R	DDM; 2R	GDM; 2R	ADO; SF	GDT; 2R	EDO; W	EDG; 2R	EDT; QF							
2015	GDC; 3R	GDT; 2R	GDM; SF	DDM; 2R	IDO; 3R	EDO; 2R	EDT; SF	EDM; QF	EDG; F						
2016	DDM; 3R	GDM; F	GDT; QF	EDM; SF	ADO; QF	EDO; F	IDO; 3R	EDT; QF	EDG; F	GDC; 3R					
2017	GDC; W	GDM; QF	GDO; W	EDG; W	GDT; SF	EDM; 3R	ADO; 2R	EDO; W	DDM; SF	GDG; 2R	IDO; W	EDT; 3R			
2018	EDO; F	GDG; F	GDO; 2R	ADO; 2R	EDG; 3R	DDM; QF	GDT; QF	DDO; QF	EDM; WD	GDC; WD	DDC; SF	IDO; 2R	EDT; 2R		
2019	EDO; SF	GDC; QF	GDG; 2R	GDO; 3R	ADO; QF	EDG; F	DDM; QF	DDO; 3R	CDO; 2R	ADC; SF	EDM; 2R	IDO; SF	GDT; QF		
2020	BDC; SF	GDC; 3R	EDG; WD	IDO; WD											
2021	HDT; QF	GDT; 2R													
2022	IDO; F	GDC; QF	GDG; 2R	ADO; 2R	EDO; 2R	CDO; WD	EDG; SF	DDC; 3R	EDM; WD	HDT; 2R	GDO; W	BDO; 2R	GDT; F		
2023	BSD; 3R	EDO; 2R	IDO; QF	GDG; 2R	ADO; 2R	DDC; QF	BDO; 2R	CDO; W	EDG; DNP	EDM; DNP	GDO; 2R	HDT; 3R	GDC; F		
2024	BDO; 3R	GDG; 2R	IDO; 1R	EDG; 1R	ADO; 3R	BSD; 2R	DDC; 2R	EDO; 3R	GDC; W	FDT; QF	HDT; 3R	SDT; 1R	CDO; 2R		
2025	BDO; 2R	EDT; 2R	IDO; QF	GDG; QF	ADO; 3R	EDG; QF	DDC; 2R	EDO; 3R	BSD; WD	FDT; 2R	CDO; 3R	HDT; 2R	SDT; 2R	GDC; QF	
2026	Did not qualify			GDG; 1R	EDG; 1R	ADO; 2R	DNP		Did not qualify						

==== Players Championships ====
Season	1	2	3	4	5	6	7	8	9	10	11	12	13	14	15	16	17	18	19	20	21	22	23	24	25	26	27	28	29	30	31	32	33	34
2012	ALI; 2R	ALI; 4R	REA; 1R	REA; 3R	CRA; 3R	CRA; 4R	BIR; 3R	BIR; 1R	CRA; QF	CRA; 4R	BAR; 2R	BAR; 3R	DUB; 2R	DUB; 2R	KIL; W	KIL; SF	CRA; QF	CRA; 4R	BAR; 3R	BAR; QF														
2013	WIG; 3R	WIG; QF	WIG; 3R	WIG; 1R	CRA; W	CRA; 4R	BAR; F	BAR; 2R	DUB; 3R	DUB; F	KIL; 2R	KIL; QF	WIG; DNP		BAR; SF	BAR; 3R																		
2014	BAR; 4R	BAR; 1R	CRA; 1R	CRA; 4R	WIG; 1R	WIG; 3R	WIG; SF	WIG; 3R	CRA; W	CRA; 1R	COV; 1R	COV; QF	CRA; 3R	CRA; 1R	DUB; 2R	DUB; 2R	CRA; 3R	CRA; QF	COV; 2R	COV; F														
2015	BAR; 4R	BAR; F	BAR; 2R	BAR; SF	BAR; 3R	COV; 1R	COV; W	COV; QF	CRA; 3R	CRA; 1R	BAR; 2R	BAR; W	WIG; 2R	WIG; QF	BAR; F	BAR; 1R	DUB; 3R	DUB; 1R	COV; W	COV; 4R														
2016	BAR; W	BAR; SF	BAR; QF	BAR; 1R	BAR; 4R	BAR; QF	BAR; F	COV; 2R	COV; QF	BAR; DNP		BAR; 3R	BAR; 1R	BAR; 3R	BAR; 3R	BAR; 1R	DUB; 3R	DUB; 3R	BAR; 3R	BAR; QF														
2017	BAR; 4R	BAR; F	BAR; 2R	BAR; 2R	MIL; 4R	MIL; F	BAR; QF	BAR; 1R	WIG; 2R	WIG; F	MIL; W	MIL; QF	WIG; 4R	WIG; 3R	BAR; DNP				DUB; F	DUB; 1R	BAR; QF	BAR; 2R												
2018	BAR; 2R	BAR; 1R	BAR; F	BAR; 1R	MIL; 2R	MIL; 2R	BAR; 4R	BAR; 2R	WIG; 3R	WIG; 2R	MIL; SF	MIL; F	WIG; 1R	WIG; W	BAR; 3R	BAR; 2R	BAR; W	BAR; 1R	DUB; 3R	DUB; 2R	BAR; DNP													
2019	WIG; SF	WIG; 2R	WIG; QF	WIG; 1R	BAR; 2R	BAR; 1R	WIG; 1R	WIG; 2R	BAR; 1R	BAR; 1R	BAR; 4R	BAR; 2R	BAR; QF	BAR; 4R	BAR; 2R	BAR; 3R	WIG; 3R	WIG; 1R	BAR; W	BAR; W	HIL; DNP		BAR; SF	BAR; 4R	BAR; QF	BAR; 1R	DUB; 3R	DUB; 4R	BAR; SF	BAR; W				
2020	BAR; QF	BAR; QF	WIG; SF	WIG; SF	WIG; W	WIG; QF	BAR; 4R	BAR; 4R	MIL; F	MIL; QF	MIL; QF	MIL; 4R	MIL; W	NIE; W	NIE; 4R	NIE; 3R	NIE; 4R	NIE; 2R	COV; QF	COV; 1R	COV; 2R	COV; W	COV; QF											
2021	BOL; 2R	BOL; 1R	BOL; 4R	BOL; 4R	MIL; 4R	MIL; 4R	MIL; 1R	MIL; W	NIE; DNP				MIL; 1R	MIL; 2R	MIL; QF	MIL; W	COV; 1R	COV; 1R	COV; 3R	COV; W	BAR; 2R	BAR; F	BAR; W	BAR; 3R	BAR; 2R	BAR; 4R	BAR; 2R	BAR; 3R	BAR; 1R	BAR; 1R				
2022	BAR; SF	BAR; W	WIG; 2R	WIG; 3R	BAR; 1R	BAR; 1R	NIE; DNP		BAR; 3R	BAR; F	BAR; 3R	BAR; 3R	BAR; 2R	WIG; DNP		NIE; 1R	NIE; QF	BAR; 4R	BAR; 3R	BAR; 2R	BAR; QF	BAR; 1R	BAR; SF	BAR; 1R	BAR; 4R	BAR; 1R	BAR; F	BAR; 1R	BAR; 3R	BAR; 2R				
2023	BAR; 1R	BAR; 3R	Did not participate										HIL; 2R	HIL; 1R	LEI; DNP		HIL; 3R	HIL; 1R	BAR; 3R	BAR; 1R	BAR; SF	BAR; 3R	BAR; DNP		BAR; 1R	BAR; QF	BAR; 2R	BAR; 1R	BAR; 1R	BAR; 1R				
2024	WIG; 1R	WIG; SF	LEI; QF	LEI; SF	HIL; QF	HIL; 1R	LEI; 1R	LEI; 1R	HIL; 1R	HIL; 3R	HIL; 2R	HIL; 4R	MIL; 2R	MIL; 2R	MIL; 1R	MIL; 2R	MIL; 1R	MIL; 2R	MIL; 1R	Did not participate									LEI; 1R	LEI; 2R				
2025	WIG; 1R	WIG; 3R	ROS; 3R	ROS; 2R	LEI; 1R	LEI; 1R	HIL; QF	HIL; 1R	LEI; 1R	LEI; 2R	LEI; F	LEI; 3R	ROS; 1R	ROS; 1R	HIL; 1R	HIL; 2R	LEI; 3R	LEI; 1R	LEI; 3R	Did not participate				MIL; 2R	MIL; 1R	HIL; DNP		LEI; 1R	LEI; 2R	LEI; 1R	WIG; 1R	WIG; 2R	WIG; 4R	WIG; 1R
2026	HIL; 1R	HIL; 1R	WIG; 1R	WIG; 1R	LEI; 2R	LEI; 2R	LEI; QF	LEI; 2R	WIG; 3R	WIG; 2R	MIL; 2R	MIL; 1R	HIL; 1R	HIL; 1R	LEI; 1R	LEI; 1R	LEI; 1R	LEI; 2R	MIL; 2R	MIL; 1R	WIG; 2R	WIG; 1R	LEI; 1R	LEI; 1R	HIL; 1R	HIL; 2R	LEI; 3R	LEI; 1R	ROS; 2R	ROS; 2R	ROS; 1R	ROS; 3R	LEI; 1R	LEI; 1R

Performance Table Legend
W	Won the tournament	F	Finalist	SF	Semifinalist	QF	Quarterfinalist	#R; RR; L#	Lost in # round Round-robin; Last # stage	DQ	Disqualified
DNQ	Did not qualify	DNP	Did not participate	WD	Withdrew	NH	Tournament not held	#R; RR; L#	Lost in # round Round-robin; Last # stage	NYF	Not yet founded

== Nine-dart finishes ==
Peter Wright televised nine-dart finishes
Date	Opponent	Tournament	Method	Prize
29 August 2020	(Northern Ireland) Daryl Gurney	Premier League	3 x T20; 3 x T20; T20, T19, D12	N/A

== High averages ==
Peter Wright televised high averages
Average	Date	Opponent	Tournament	Stage	Score	Ref.
119.50	2 March 2017	Adrian Lewis	2017 Premier League	Week 5	7–2 (W)	
113.02	3 February 2022	Jonny Clayton	2022 Premier League	Week 1 (Final)	6–1 (W)	

== Notes ==
Sporting positions
Preceded by Gerwyn Price	PDC World Number One; 6 March – 24 July 2022	Succeeded by Gerwyn Price
Preceded by Gerwyn Price	PDC World Number One; 9 – 30 October 2022	Succeeded by Gerwyn Price
Awards
Preceded by Gerwyn Price	PDC Player of the Year; 2021	Succeeded by Michael Smith
