= Champions League of Darts =

Tournament information
- Venue: Cardiff International Arena (2016–17); Brighton Centre (2018); Leicester Arena (2019)
- Location: Cardiff (2016–17); Brighton (2018); Leicester (2019)
- Country: United Kingdom
- Established: 2016
- Organisation(s): PDC
- Format: Legs, Group Stage and Knockout
- Prize fund: £250,000 (2019)
- Month(s) Played: September
- Final Year: 2019

Final champion(s)
- (Netherlands) Michael van Gerwen

The Champions League of Darts, also known as the Paddy Power Champions League of Darts for sponsorship purposes, was a non-ranking darts tournament organised by the Professional Darts Corporation held each year in September from 2016 until 2019. Featuring just the top eight players in the PDC, it was played over two days in a group stage, and then knockout format and was the smallest of the PDC's televised premier events.

It was first held in September 2016 at the Cardiff International Arena in Cardiff, the inaugural champion was Phil Taylor. The next two were then won by Mensur Suljović and Gary Anderson, before the final champion was Michael van Gerwen in 2019. Following the cancellation of the 2020 tournament, owing to the COVID-19 pandemic, the tournament was quietly shelved by the PDC.

The tournament was the first PDC event to be broadcast on the BBC.

== History ==
The details of the inaugural tournament were announced by the PDC on 9 February 2016, in conjunction with the announcement of a new broadcasting deal between the PDC and the BBC. With the PDC 2016 calendar having already been announced in August 2015, a Barnsley round of the PDC Player Championship was moved to accommodate it. A second Champions League tournament was duly announced as part of the August 2016 release of the 2017 calendar. A further two editions were held, before the fifth edition, which was due to be held in 2020, was cancelled as a result of the COVID-19 pandemic. The tournament was subsequently shelved by the PDC.

In addition to the prize money allocated to players, the tournament was known for a £100,000 cash prize given to the crowd in the event of a nine-dart finish. This prize was believed to be the biggest crowd prize in world sport.

== Eligibility ==
Only the top eight players on the PDC Order of Merit qualified for the inaugural tournament, signifying the best eight players in the PDC (in 2016 based on the order following the World Matchplay in July). Starting with 2017, the reigning champion was given a guaranteed slot, meaning only the top seven and the champion would qualify if the champion was not in the top eight.

== Format ==
The tournament format is a group stage followed by a knockout stage. The group stage features two groups of four, who meet each other in a round-robin format, i.e. each player playing their group opponents once in a single match. The best two players in each group advance to the semi-finals, the winners meeting in the final. There is no third place play-off. Matches in the group stage are won by the first player to win 10 legs (best of 19), while the knockout stages are first to 11 (best of 21).

== Champions League of Darts finals ==
Year	Champion (average in final)	Score	Runner-up (average in final)	Prize money			Venue
Year	Champion (average in final)	Score	Runner-up (average in final)	Total	Champion	Runner-up	Venue
2016	(England) Phil Taylor (98.97)	11–5	(Netherlands) Michael van Gerwen (100.92)	£250,000	£100,000	£50,000	(Wales) Cardiff International Arena, Cardiff
2017	(Austria) Mensur Suljović (87.85)	11–9	(Scotland) Gary Anderson (98.03)	£250,000	£100,000	£50,000	(Wales) Cardiff International Arena, Cardiff
2018	(Scotland) Gary Anderson (101.47)	11–4	(Scotland) Peter Wright (93.85)	£250,000	£100,000	£50,000	(England) Brighton Centre, Brighton
2019	(Netherlands) Michael van Gerwen (100.87)	11–10	(Scotland) Peter Wright (97.42)	£250,000	£100,000	£50,000	(England) Leicester Arena, Leicester
2020	Cancelled due to COVID-19 pandemic.						

== Records and statistics ==
As of 20 October 2019.

=== Total finalist appearances ===
Rank	Player	Nationality	Won	Runner-up	Finals	Appearances
1	**Gary Anderson**	Scotland	1	1	2	2
1	**Michael van Gerwen**	Netherlands	1	1	2	2
3	Phil Taylor	England	1	0	1	1
3	**Mensur Suljović**	Austria	1	0	1	1
5	**Peter Wright**	Scotland	0	2	2	2

- Active players are shown in **bold**
- Only players who reached the final are included
- In the event of identical records, players are sorted by date first achieved

=== Champions by country ===
Country	Players	Total	First title	Last title
England	1	1	2016	2016
Austria	1	1	2017	2017
Scotland	1	1	2018	2018
Netherlands	1	1	2019	2019

=== High averages ===
Ten highest Champions League of Darts one-match averages
Average	Player	Year (+ Round)	Opponent	Result
111.23	(Netherlands) Michael van Gerwen	2018, Group stage	(England) Dave Chisnall	10–2
108.31	(England) Phil Taylor	2016, Group stage	(Scotland) Robert Thornton	10–2
107.49	(England) Phil Taylor	2016, Group stage	(Netherlands) Michael van Gerwen	10–4
105.67	(Netherlands) Michael van Gerwen	2016, Semi-finals	(Scotland) Gary Anderson	11–5
105.54	(Netherlands) Michael van Gerwen	2019, Semi-finals	(Wales) Gerwyn Price	11–10
105.53	(Austria) Mensur Suljović	2018, Group stage	(Scotland) Peter Wright	10–7
104.13	(Netherlands) Michael van Gerwen	2016, Group stage	(England) Phil Taylor	4–10
103.49	(England) James Wade	2016, Group stage	(England) Adrian Lewis	10–3
103.52	(Scotland) Peter Wright	2019, Semi-finals	(England) Michael Smith	11–5
103.40	(Netherlands) Michael van Gerwen	2019, Group stage	(England) James Wade	10–8

Five highest Champions League of Darts losing averages
Average	Player	Year (+ Round)	Opponent	Result
104.13	(Netherlands) Michael van Gerwen	2016, Group stage	(England) Phil Taylor	4–10
102.89	(Netherlands) Michael van Gerwen	2017, Group stage	(England) Phil Taylor	9–10
102.49	(Wales) Gerwyn Price	2019, Semi-finals	(Netherlands) Michael van Gerwen	10–11
102.13	(Scotland) Peter Wright	2018, Group stage	(Austria) Mensur Suljović	7–10
101.48	(Scotland) Gary Anderson	2018, Group stage	(Northern Ireland) Daryl Gurney	8–10

== Broadcaster ==
The tournament was the first PDC event to be broadcast on the BBC, after they ended their contract to broadcast rights of the BDO World Darts Championship.

== Sponsorship ==
In 2016 and 2017, the title sponsor of the tournament was bookmaker Unibet, who for the 2016 season were the pre-existing sponsors of the PDC's Masters and European Championship, and the new sponsor of the PDC's World Grand Prix. Since 2018 the tournament has been sponsored by bookmaker Paddy Power.
