= 2017 Champions League of Darts =

2017 Unibet Champions League of Darts

Tournament information
- Dates: 16–17 September 2017
- Venue: Motorpoint Arena Cardiff
- Location: Cardiff, Wales
- Organisation(s): Professional Darts Corporation (PDC)
- Format: Legs
- Prize fund: £250,000
- Winner's share: £100,000
- High checkout: 170 Adrian Lewis

Champion(s)
- Mensur Suljović (AUT)

The 2017 Champions League of Darts, also known as the Unibet Champions League of Darts for sponsorship purposes, was the 2nd annual staging of the tournament, organised by the Professional Darts Corporation. It took place from 16 to 17 September 2017 at the Cardiff International Arena, Wales.

Phil Taylor was the defending champion after winning the first edition of the tournament against Michael van Gerwen 11–5, but lost in the semi-finals to Gary Anderson.

Mensur Suljović won his first major title, beating Anderson 11–9 in the final after already defeating him in the group stage.

== Format ==
The eight qualifiers were split in two groups, playing each other one time in a best of 19-legs match. The top two of each group proceeded to the semi-finals. Both semi-finals and the final were a best of 21-legs match.

== Prize money ==
Stage (number of players)		Prize money (Total: £250,000)
Winner	(1)	£100,000
Runner-Up	(1)	£50,000
Semi-finalists	(2)	£25,000
Third in group stage	(2)	£15,000
Fourth in group stage	(2)	£10,000

== Qualifiers ==
The top 7 players on the PDC Order of Merit following the 2017 World Matchplay qualified. Reigning champion Phil Taylor was given a guaranteed place in the tournament, as will each future winner of the tournament. As Taylor was also one of the Top 7 players, the eighth ranked player also qualified.

1. (Netherlands) Michael van Gerwen (group stage)
2. (Scotland) Gary Anderson (runner-up)
3. (Scotland) Peter Wright (group stage)
4. (England) Phil Taylor (semi-finals)
5. (England) Adrian Lewis (group stage)
6. (England) Dave Chisnall (group stage)
7. (Austria) Mensur Suljović (winner)
8. (Netherlands) Raymond van Barneveld (semi-finals)

== Results ==
=== Group stage ===
All matches first-to-10 (best of 19 legs)

NB: P = Played; W = Won; L = Lost; LF = Legs for; LA = Legs against; +/− = Plus/minus record, in relation to legs; Avg – 3-dart average; Pts = Points

==== Group A ====
Pos.	Player	P	W	L	LF	LA	+/–	Avg	Pts
1	(England) Phil Taylor (4)	3	3	0	30	22	+8	98.98	6
2	(Netherlands) Raymond van Barneveld (8)	3	2	1	26	17	+9	94.59	4
3	(Netherlands) Michael van Gerwen (1)	3	1	2	24	24	0	99.53	2
4	(England) Adrian Lewis (5)	3	0	3	13	30	–17	91.00	0

16 September

97.46 (1) Michael van Gerwen (Netherlands)	5 – 10	(8) (Netherlands) Raymond van Barneveld 97.19
101.58 (4) Phil Taylor (England)	10 – 7	(5) (England) Adrian Lewis 96.57

16 September

97.18 (1) Michael van Gerwen (Netherlands)	10 – 4	(5) (England) Adrian Lewis 85.13
92.53 (4) Phil Taylor (England)	10 – 6	(8) (Netherlands) Raymond van Barneveld 92.29

17 September

102.89 (1) Michael van Gerwen (Netherlands)	9 – 10	(4) (England) Phil Taylor 102.09
89.95 (5) Adrian Lewis (England)	2 – 10	(8) (Netherlands) Raymond van Barneveld 94.40

==== Group B ====
Pos.	Player	P	W	L	LF	LA	+/–	Avg	Pts
1	(Austria) Mensur Suljović (7)	3	3	0	30	16	+14	100.24	6
2	(Scotland) Gary Anderson (2)	3	2	1	23	26	–3	99.12	4
3	(Scotland) Peter Wright (3)	3	1	2	27	25	+2	100.05	2
4	(England) Dave Chisnall (6)	3	0	3	17	30	–13	97.15	0

16 September

95.84 (2) Gary Anderson (Scotland)	3 – 10	(7) (Austria) Mensur Suljović 97.73
101.28 (3) Peter Wright (Scotland)	10 – 5	(6) (England) Dave Chisnall 97.08

16 September

101.80 (2) Gary Anderson (Scotland)	10 – 7	(6) (England) Dave Chisnall 95.78
98.93 (3) Peter Wright (Scotland)	8 – 10	(7) (Austria) Mensur Suljović 102.77

17 September

98.97 (2) Gary Anderson (Scotland)	10 – 9	(3) (Scotland) Peter Wright 100.15
98.76 (6) Dave Chisnall (England)	5 – 10	(7) (Austria) Mensur Suljović 99.37

=== Knockout stage ===
Semi-finals (best of 21 legs); 17 September
A1	(England) Phil Taylor (4) 95.04	6
B2	(Scotland) Gary Anderson (2) 96.19	11
B1	(Austria) Mensur Suljović (7) 97.91	11
A2	(Netherlands) Raymond van Barneveld (8) 95.19	9

Final (best of 21 legs); 17 September
B2	(Scotland) Gary Anderson (2) 98.03	9
B1	(Austria) Mensur Suljović (7) 87.85	11
