= 2016 Champions League of Darts =

2016 Unibet Champions League of Darts

Tournament information
- Dates: 24–25 September 2016
- Venue: Cardiff International Arena
- Location: Cardiff, Wales
- Organisation(s): Professional Darts Corporation (PDC)
- Format: Legs
- Prize fund: £250,000
- Winner's share: £100,000
- High checkout: 167 Phil Taylor

Champion(s)
- Phil Taylor (ENG)

The 2016 Champions League of Darts, also known as the Unibet Champions League of Darts for sponsorship purposes, was the inaugural staging of the tournament, organised by the Professional Darts Corporation. It took place from 24–25 September 2016 at the Cardiff International Arena, Wales. Phil Taylor won, defeating Michael van Gerwen 11–5 in the final.

== Format ==
The eight qualifying entrants were first split into two groups of four, playing each other once in best of 19-legged matches. The top two players in each group then proceeded to a knockout stage of two semi-finals and a final, all best of 21 legs.

== Qualifiers ==
Only the top eight players on the PDC Order of Merit on 12 August 2016 qualified for the tournament; they were:

1. (Netherlands) Michael van Gerwen (runner-up)
2. (Scotland) Gary Anderson (semi-finals)
3. (England) Adrian Lewis (group stage)
4. (England) Phil Taylor (winner)
5. (Scotland) Peter Wright (group stage)
6. (England) James Wade (semi-finals)
7. (England) Michael Smith (group stage)
8. (Scotland) Robert Thornton (group stage)

== Prize fund ==
The prize money was distributed as follows:

Stage (number of players)		Prize money (Total: £250,000)
Winner	(1)	£100,000
Runner-up	(1)	£50,000
Semi-finalists	(2)	£25,000
Third in group stage	(2)	£15,000
Fourth in group stage	(2)	£10,000

== Results ==
=== Group stage ===
All matches first-to-10 (best of 19 legs)

NB: P = Played; W = Won; L = Lost; LF = Legs for; LA = Legs against; +/− = Plus/minus record, in relation to legs; Pts = Points;

==== Group A ====
Pos.	Player	P	W	L	LF	LA	+/–	Pts
1	(England) Phil Taylor (4)	3	3	0	30	11	+19	6
2	(Netherlands) Michael van Gerwen (1)	3	2	1	24	20	+4	4
3	(Scotland) Peter Wright (5)	3	1	2	20	26	–6	2
4	(Scotland) Robert Thornton (8)	3	0	3	13	30	–17	0

24 September

102.66 (4) Phil Taylor (England)	10 – 5	(5) (Scotland) Peter Wright 97.70
97.30 (1) Michael van Gerwen (Netherlands)	10 – 5	(8) (Scotland) Robert Thornton 91.10
104.13 (1) Michael van Gerwen (Netherlands)	4 – 10	(4) (England) Phil Taylor 107.49
94.30 (5) Peter Wright (Scotland)	10 – 6	(8) (Scotland) Robert Thornton 90.80

25 September

108.31 (4) Phil Taylor (England)	10 – 2	(8) (Scotland) Robert Thornton 100.62
100.27 (1) Michael van Gerwen (Netherlands)	10 – 5	(5) (Scotland) Peter Wright 94.85

==== Group B ====
Pos.	Player	P	W	L	LF	LA	+/−	Pts
1	(Scotland) Gary Anderson (2)	3	3	0	30	18	+12	6
2	(England) James Wade (6)	3	2	1	28	18	+10	4
3	(England) Adrian Lewis (3)	3	1	2	18	28	–10	2
4	(England) Michael Smith (7)	3	0	3	18	30	–12	0

24 September

96.86 (2) Gary Anderson (Scotland)	10 – 5	(7) (England) Michael Smith 87.65
97.48 (3) Adrian Lewis (England)	3 – 10	(6) (England) James Wade 103.49
95.85 (3) Adrian Lewis (England)	10 – 8	(7) (England) Michael Smith 87.28
94.62 (2) Gary Anderson (Scotland)	10 – 8	(6) (England) James Wade 90.66

25 September

103.03 (6) James Wade (England)	10 – 5	(7) (England) Michael Smith 95.30
91.18 (2) Gary Anderson (Scotland)	10 – 5	(3) (England) Adrian Lewis 92.01

=== Knockout stage ===
25 September - All matches first-to-11 (best of 21 legs)

Semi-finals
A1	(England) Phil Taylor (4) 98.38	11
B2	(England) James Wade (6) 94.66	3
B1	(Scotland) Gary Anderson (2) 96.22	5
A2	(Netherlands) Michael van Gerwen (1) 105.67	11

Final
A1	(England) Phil Taylor (4) 98.97	11
A2	(Netherlands) Michael van Gerwen (1) 100.92	5

== Broadcasting ==
In the United Kingdom, the event was televised by the BBC. The first group games were televised on BBC One; and, from the second group games onwards, BBC Two. Jason Mohammad presented coverage with Paul Nicholson, Mark Webster, and Alan Warriner-Little being the analysts. Vassos Alexander, Dan Dawson, Nicholson, and Warriner-Little were the match commentators.
