= 2025 World Grand Prix (darts) =

Darts tournament

2025 BOYLE Sports World Grand Prix

Tournament information
- Dates: 6–12 October 2025
- Venue: Mattioli Arena
- Location: Leicester, England
- Organisation(s): Professional Darts Corporation (PDC)
- Format: Sets "Double in, double out"
- Prize fund: £600,000
- Winner's share: £120,000
- High checkout: 170; Nathan Aspinall; Luke Littler

Champion(s)
- Luke Littler (ENG)

The 2025 World Grand Prix (known for sponsorship reasons as the 2025 BOYLE Sports World Grand Prix) was a professional darts tournament that was held at the Mattioli Arena in Leicester, England, from 6 to 12 October 2025. It was the 28th staging of the World Grand Prix by the Professional Darts Corporation (PDC). The total prize fund was £600,000, with the winner receiving £120,000.

The tournament, sponsored by BoyleSports and played in the "double in, double out" format, featured 32 players: the top 16 players on the two-year PDC Order of Merit and the top 16 players from the one-year PDC Pro Tour Order of Merit who had not yet qualified. Wessel Nijman and Niko Springer made their debuts at the event, while two-time runner-up Dave Chisnall missed out on qualification for the first time since 2011. Mike De Decker was the defending champion, having defeated Luke Humphries 6–4 in the 2024 final, but he lost 3–0 to Luke Littler in the second round.

Littler won the tournament and the first World Grand Prix title of his career by defeating Humphries 6–1 in the final. Gian van Veen broke the record for the highest three-dart average in World Grand Prix history, averaging 106.47 in defeat as he lost 2–0 to Littler in the first round.

== Overview ==
=== Background ===
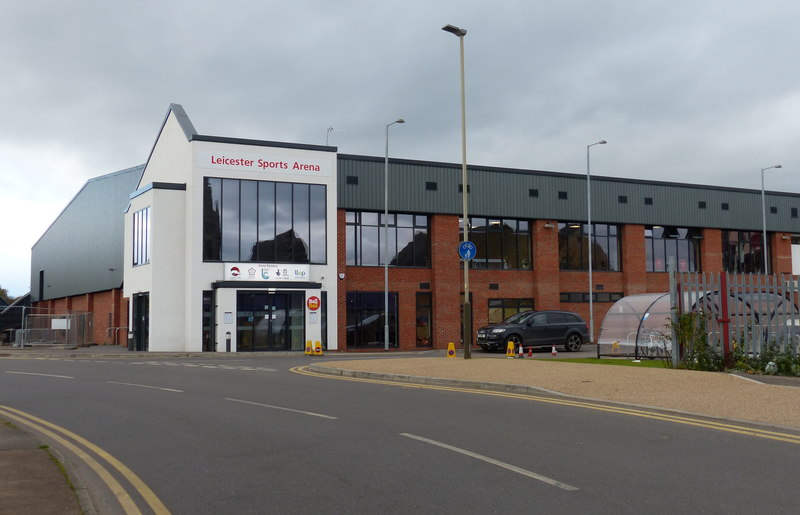
The tournament was held at the Mattioli Arena (pictured in 2017) in Leicester, England.

The 2025 World Grand Prix was the 28th edition of the tournament to be staged by the Professional Darts Corporation (PDC) since the 1998 edition. The tournament is unique as it is the only event in the darts calendar that uses the "double in, double out" format, in which players must start on a double or the bullseye to start scoring and do the same to win a leg. The inaugural edition in 1998 featured matches consisting of sets played to the best of three legs, with Phil Taylor winning the final 13–8 against Rod Harrington. After first serving as host venue for the 2001 event, the Citywest Hotel in Dublin became the regular home of the tournament. In 2020, amidst the COVID-19 pandemic, the World Grand Prix was relocated to England due to the Citywest being used for health services, with the event being held in Leicester since 2021. Brendan Dolan became the first player to hit a double-start nine-dart finish, achieving the feat in his match against James Wade at the 2011 World Grand Prix; Wade and Robert Thornton both hit nine-darters in their match at the 2014 event.

The 2025 edition took place from 6 to 12 October 2025 at the Mattioli Arena in Leicester. Irish gambling company BoyleSports continued its sponsorship of the event, having extended its partnership with the PDC until 2027. Mike De Decker entered the tournament as defending champion after defeating Luke Humphries 6–4 in the 2024 final to win his first PDC major title. De Decker looked to become the third player to retain the World Grand Prix, after Phil Taylor and Michael van Gerwen. Reigning world champion Luke Littler and world number one Humphries were seen as the pre-tournament favourites to win the title.

=== Format ===
The tournament featured 32 players; the top 16 players on the PDC Order of Merit were seeded and were drawn to compete against the 16 qualifiers from the PDC Pro Tour Order of Merit in the first round. All matches were in set play format, with each set being played to the best of five legs (first to three); it is one of three PDC tournaments that uses set play, along with the World Championship and the World Masters. As per the "double in, double out" format, players had to begin a leg by hitting a double or the bullseye and do the same to win a leg. The amount of sets required to win a match increased as the tournament progressed:

Round	Best of (sets)	First to (sets)
First	3	2
Second	5	3
Quarter-finals	5	3
Semi-finals	9	5
Final	11	6

=== Prize money ===
The prize fund remained at £600,000, with £120,000 going to the winner. The prize fund breakdown was:

Position (num. of players)		Prize money (Total: £600,000)
Winner	(1)	£120,000
Runner-up	(1)	£60,000
Semi-finalists	(2)	£40,000
Quarter-finalists	(4)	£25,000
Second round	(8)	£15,000
First round	(16)	£7,500

=== Broadcasts ===
The tournament is broadcast on Sky Sports in the United Kingdom and Ireland. Other broadcasters include DAZN in Germany, Austria and Switzerland; Viaplay in the Netherlands and Scandinavia; Fox Sports in Australia; Sky Sport in New Zealand; VTM in Belgium; Peacock in the United States; FanDuel in the United States, Canada, Puerto Rico, Mexico and Brazil; Nova in Czechia and Slovakia; L'Équipe in France; AMC Sport in Hungary; Zonasport in Croatia and Arena Sport in the Balkans. It was also available on the PDC's streaming service, PDCTV, for international subscribers.

== Qualification ==
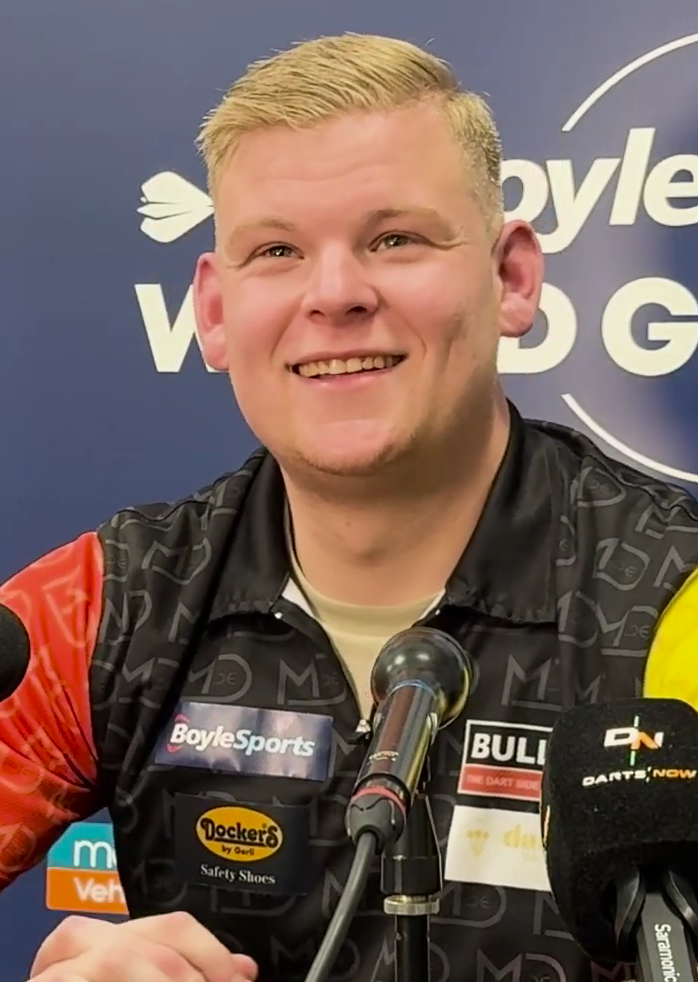
Mike De Decker (pictured in 2024) entered the tournament as defending champion.

The 32 participants comprised two qualification routes. The top 16 players on the two-year PDC Order of Merit at the cut-off point on 29 September were seeded for the tournament. The top 16 players on the one-year PDC Pro Tour Order of Merit, not to have already qualified through the main ranking, were unseeded. The final tournament before the cut-off date for qualification was the 2025 Swiss Darts Trophy.

Two-time runner-up Dave Chisnall failed to qualify for the event for the first time since 2011, having been overtaken by Raymond van Barneveld on the Pro Tour Order of Merit and by Martin Schindler on the PDC Order of Merit during the Swiss Darts Trophy. 2023 world champion Michael Smith, 2024 European champion Ritchie Edhouse, 2011 World Grand Prix runner-up Brendan Dolan and 2024 World Grand Prix semi-finalist Dimitri Van den Bergh also missed out on qualification. Wessel Nijman and Niko Springer made their tournament debuts, with the latter winning his first PDC ranking title at the 2025 Hungarian Darts Trophy to enter the field in his first year as a professional player. 2007 and 2010 champion James Wade qualified for his 21st consecutive World Grand Prix, a tournament record.

The following players qualified for the tournament:

PDC Order of Merit

1. Luke Humphries (ENG) (runner-up)
2. Luke Littler (ENG) (champion)
3. Michael van Gerwen (NED) (first round)
4. Stephen Bunting (ENG) (second round)
5. James Wade (ENG) (first round)
6. Jonny Clayton (WAL) (semi-finals)
7. Gerwyn Price (WAL) (quarter-finals)
8. Chris Dobey (ENG) (first round)
9. Rob Cross (ENG) (second round)
10. Josh Rock (NIR) (second round)
11. Damon Heta (AUS) (first round)
12. Gary Anderson (SCO) (quarter-finals)
13. Danny Noppert (NED) (semi-finals)
14. Ross Smith (ENG) (first round)
15. Peter Wright (SCO) (first round)
16. Martin Schindler (GER) (first round)

Pro Tour Order of Merit

1. Gian van Veen (NED) (first round)
2. Wessel Nijman (NED) (first round)
3. Cameron Menzies (SCO) (quarter-finals)
4. Nathan Aspinall (ENG) (first round)
5. Jermaine Wattimena (NED) (first round)
6. Dirk van Duijvenbode (NED) (quarter-finals)
7. Luke Woodhouse (ENG) (second round)
8. Ryan Searle (ENG) (first round)
9. Mike De Decker (BEL) (second round)
10. Joe Cullen (ENG) (second round)
11. Ryan Joyce (ENG) (first round)
12. Niko Springer (GER) (first round)
13. Daryl Gurney (NIR) (second round)
14. Krzysztof Ratajski (POL) (second round)
15. Raymond van Barneveld (NED) (first round)
16. Andrew Gilding (ENG) (first round)

== Summary ==
=== First round ===
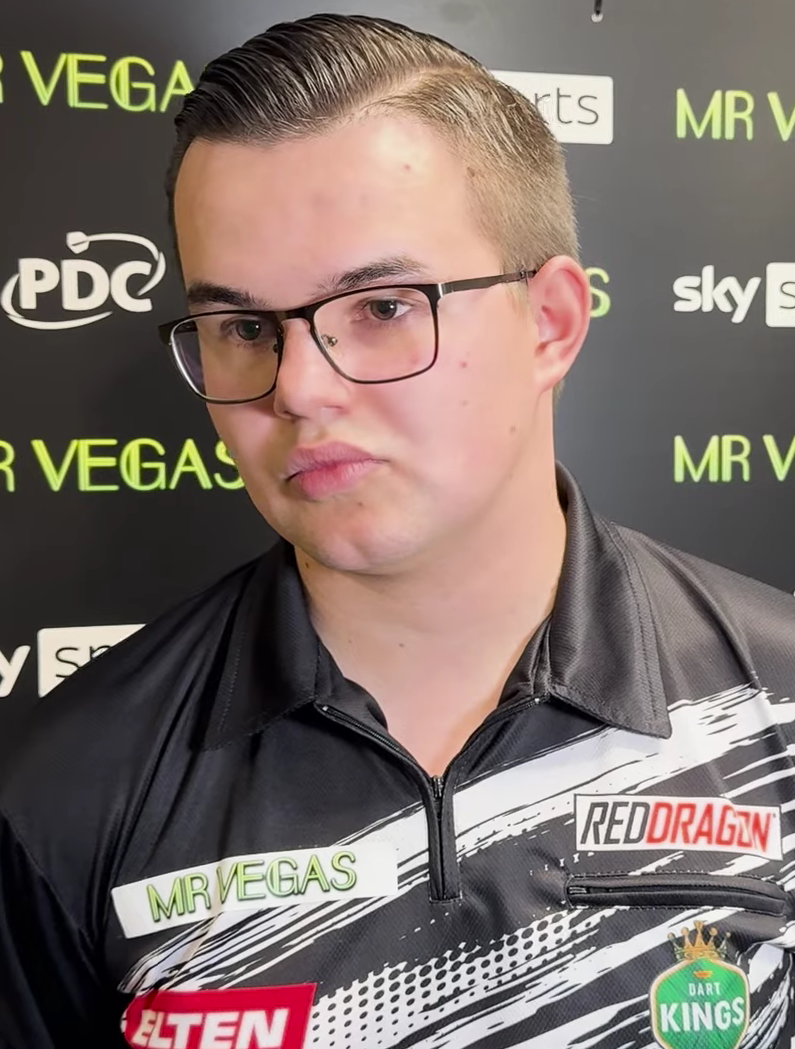
Gian van Veen (pictured in 2024) achieved the highest three-dart average in World Grand Prix history, averaging 106.47 despite losing 2–0 to Luke Littler.

The first round was played on 6 and 7 October. World number one and 2023 World Grand Prix champion Luke Humphries began his campaign with a victory against Nathan Aspinall by 2–0 in sets. Aspinall achieved a 170 checkout in the second leg of the match but went on to lose the first set 3–2. Humphries opened the next set with a 156 finish before claiming the next two legs to win the match. Humphries commented afterwards that his starting doubles helped him, as his scoring was "a bit strange" and his darts "just didn't want to drop in". Krzysztof Ratajski set up a meeting with Humphries in the second round by defeating 16th seed Martin Schindler 2–0, only dropping one leg during the match. Stephen Bunting recorded the highest three-dart average of the opening night—97.02—in his 2–0 win over German debutant Niko Springer. Danny Noppert lost the first four legs of his match against Dutch compatriot Jermaine Wattimena but managed to take a 2–1 victory, surviving a match dart from Wattimena before completing the comeback with a 158 checkout. Debutant Wessel Nijman also missed a match dart to progress to the next round as he lost a deciding leg to Rob Cross. Two-time champion and fifth seed James Wade was eliminated by Joe Cullen in a 2–0 defeat. Cameron Menzies earned his first World Grand Prix win by beating eighth seed Chris Dobey 2–0, while 2016 runner-up Gary Anderson held off a comeback from Raymond van Barneveld as he prevailed in a deciding leg.

Reigning world champion Luke Littler achieved his first win at the World Grand Prix by defeating Gian van Veen, the reigning World Youth Champion, 2–0. Despite only winning two legs, Van Veen broke the record for the highest three-dart average in tournament history by averaging 106.47 in defeat, besting Alan Warriner-Little's 106.45 average at the 2001 event. On the match, Littler said that Van Veen "played his part in a brilliant game" and that getting his first win at the event "feels amazing". World number three and six-time champion Michael van Gerwen exited in the first round for the second year in a row, losing 2–0 to Dirk van Duijvenbode. Defending champion Mike De Decker came back from one set down to beat 15th seed Peter Wright 2–1, while 2017 champion Daryl Gurney defeated 14th seed Ross Smith 2–0. 2020 champion Gerwyn Price was whitewashed in the first set of his match against Ryan Searle but rallied to take a 2–1 win. 2021 champion Jonny Clayton defeated Andrew Gilding 2–0 and Josh Rock beat Ryan Joyce in a deciding leg. Luke Woodhouse missed his first seven darts at starting doubles in the deciding leg of his match against Damon Heta but hit back-to-back maximums before winning the decider with a 90 checkout, extending Heta's streak of losses at the World Grand Prix to five matches.

=== Second round ===
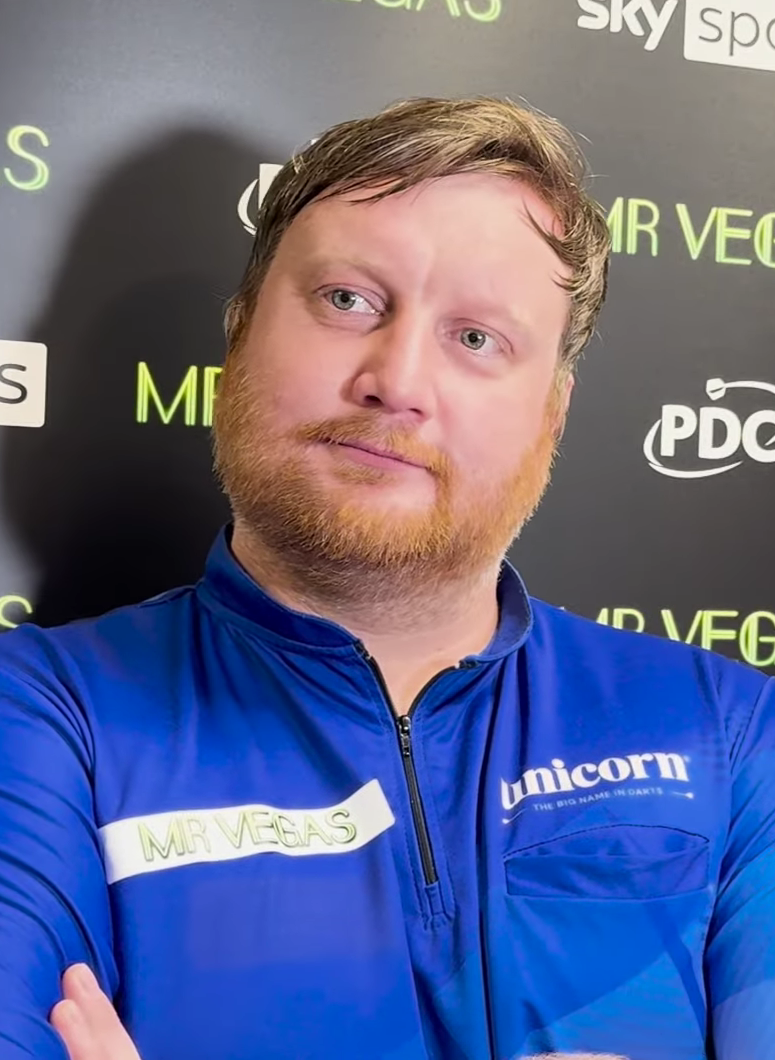
Cameron Menzies (pictured in 2024) defeated ninth seed Rob Cross 3–1 with his ninth match dart.

The second round was played on 8 and 9 October. Luke Humphries advanced to the quarter-finals by defeating Krzysztof Ratajski 3–1. Despite the scoreline, Humphries revealed that he went off stage at the interval unhappy with how he was playing and started throwing slower, which helped him improve. He explained: "On the practice board I am hitting everything and then I am going out there and not so I needed to change something." Cameron Menzies took the first set in his match against ninth seed Rob Cross in a deciding leg and whitewashed Cross in the second. Menzies missed a total of eight match darts before winning the match 3–1 with his ninth. Progressing to his second major quarter-final, having previously reached the last eight of the 2024 Grand Slam of Darts, Menzies lamented that his missed match darts "weren’t really badly thrown. They were all on the wire". Danny Noppert led fourth seed Stephen Bunting 2–1 when they went to a deciding leg in the fourth set, where Noppert converted a 100 checkout to win 3–1; Bunting disclosed on social media that he was suffering from an injured back. Gary Anderson eased his way into the quarter-finals with a 3–0 victory against Joe Cullen, who claimed one leg and ended the match with a three-dart average of 68.05. Anderson believed that Cullen was "miles off" his usual standard.

Luke Littler ended Mike De Decker's reign as World Grand Prix champion as he defeated the defending champion 3–0, winning the match with a 170 checkout. De Decker missed 41 doubles in 11 legs, resulting in Littler calling the match "a bit boring at times" as he "expected something from the reigning champion". Gerwyn Price, who won eight consecutive legs and completed a 10-dart leg, beat Josh Rock 3–0 to set up a quarter-final tie with Littler. Price opted to start on double 13 during the match, explaining that he hit it "all the time" in practice and thought it, or double 6, was easier than going for double 20. Jonny Clayton reached his third World Grand Prix quarter-final by defeating Luke Woodhouse 3–1, while Dirk van Duijvenbode converted a 158 checkout to complete a 3–0 victory against Daryl Gurney, reaching the quarter-finals of the tournament for the first time since he made the final of the 2020 edition.

=== Quarter-finals ===
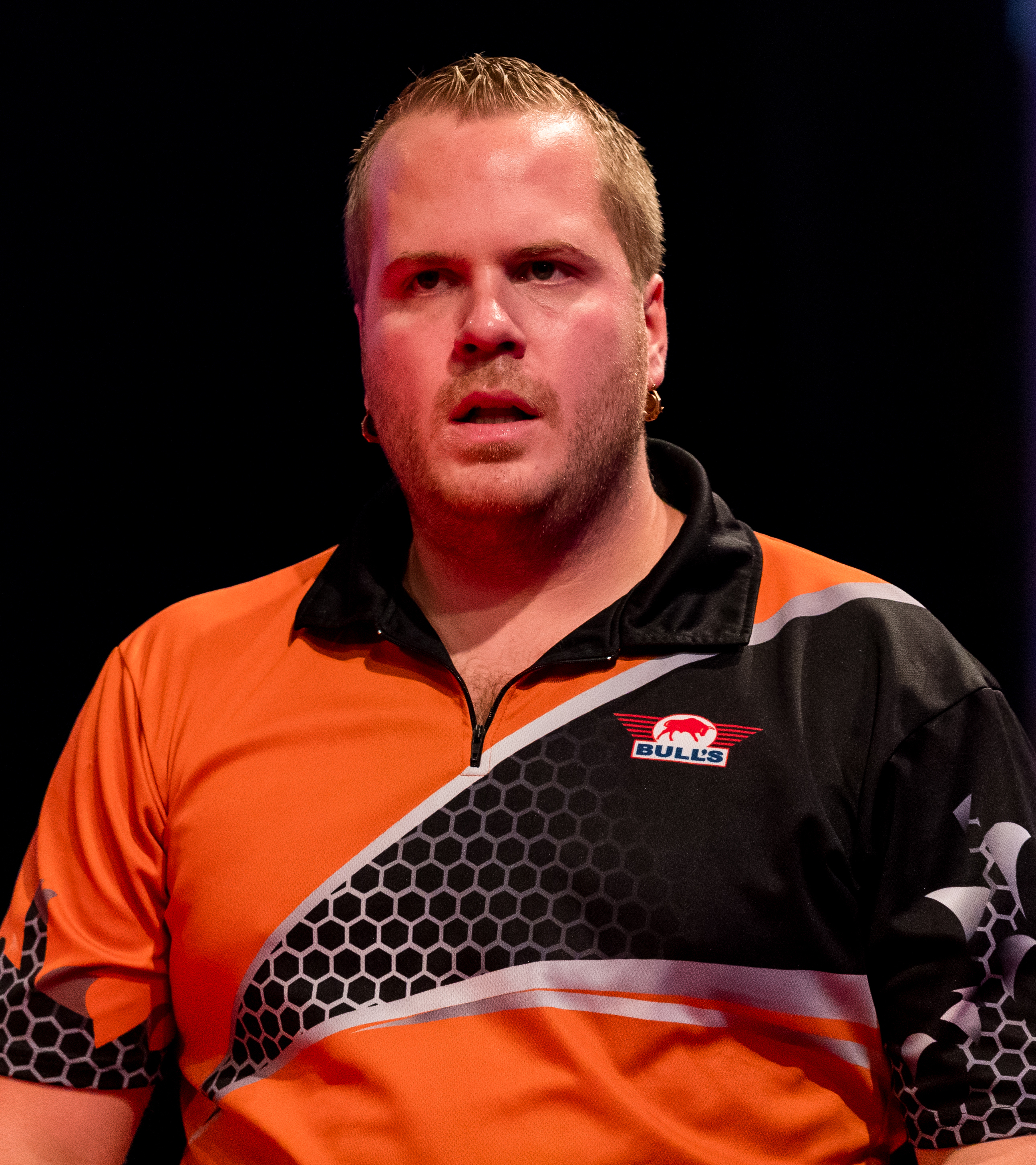
Dirk van Duijvenbode (pictured in 2019) reached the quarter-finals of the event for the first time since reaching the final at the 2020 edition.

The quarter-finals were played on 10 October. Gerwyn Price took a 2–0 lead against Luke Littler to go one set away from eliminating the pre-tournament favourite. At 2–1, Littler landed a 154 checkout with Price on the brink of victory, with Price also missing three match darts to win the match, allowing Littler to level at 2–2 and send the match into a deciding set. Littler won the next two legs, but Price responded with a 15-dart hold of throw followed by a 156 checkout to take the match to a last-leg decider. Both players had trouble on the starting doubles to begin the deciding leg, with neither scoring heavily during their next visits to the board. Price left a two-dart combination to win, but Littler converted a 152 checkout to triumph and complete his comeback. Littler described the contest as "very, very strange", adding: "I just thought 'It’s now or never' after going 2–0 down. I had to switch on." Sky Sports pundit Wayne Mardle echoed Littler's sentiments, saying that the two players were "both so unreliable" and that the match was "so dramatic in a weird way". Price responded to the defeat on Instagram, stating that Littler played "great in patches" while also bringing attention to crowd behaviour: "This is why we need to play majors in neutral venues/countries." Luke Humphries overcame a mid-match resurgence from Cameron Menzies to win 3–1 and progress to a semi-final against Danny Noppert, who defeated Gary Anderson by the same scoreline. Anderson won the first set with a 158 checkout on the bullseye, but Noppert claimed the next three to advance to his second World Grand Prix semi-final. Jonny Clayton lost the opening leg of his match with Dirk van Duijvenbode but won the next nine in a row for a 3–1 victory, progressing to a semi-final tie with Littler.

=== Semi-finals ===
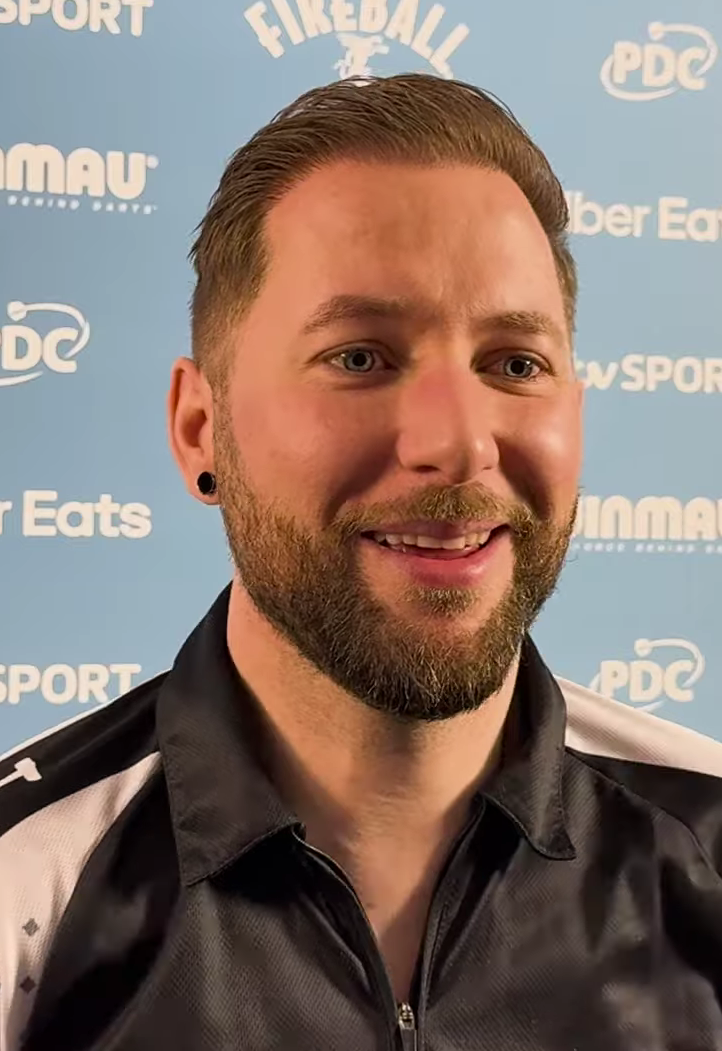
Danny Noppert (pictured) competed in his second World Grand Prix semi-final.

The semi-finals were played on 11 October, with Luke Humphries facing Danny Noppert and Luke Littler facing Jonny Clayton. Humphries appeared in his third consecutive World Grand Prix semi-final, while Noppert and Clayton reached the last four for the first time since the 2021 edition. Littler competed in his first semi-final. Clayton's run meant that he had reached the semi-finals of every televised ranking event up to that point, after also reaching the final four of the World Masters, the UK Open and the World Matchplay. Being interviewed after their quarter-final victories, Littler said, "I shouldn't be here, but I am," in reference to his comeback win against Gerwyn Price, also predicting that his tie against Clayton "should be another good game", while Humphries looked ahead to a clash with Littler in the final: "We [Humphries and Littler] find a way to win and hopefully maybe you'll see us here on Sunday."

Humphries opened his semi-final match with Noppert by taking a 2–0 lead, including checkouts of 155 and 108 in the first set. Noppert maintained a three-dart average over 105 over the course of the first two sets, but a dip in performance during the third set allowed Humphries to extend his advantage to 3–0. Noppert earned his first set in a deciding leg and responded to Humphries going 4–1 ahead by winning the next two, pulling the score back to 4–3 and sparking a potential comeback, having won three of the last four sets. However, Humphries opened the eighth set with a 135 checkout to break throw, followed by a 110 finish to hold, before eventually winning the match 5–3 by pinning double 12. "I knew it was going to be a battle but I'm proud of the resilience I showed tonight," Humphries said after the victory.

Clayton broke Littler's throw to open their semi-final but Littler responded with a 161 checkout to break back, taking the first set with back-to-back 15-dart legs. He extended his lead to 2–0, but checkouts of 154 and 128 helped Clayton halve the deficit to 2–1. The two contested a close fourth set which entered a deciding leg, where Littler took out a 140 checkout on his favoured doubled 10 as Clayton left himself on 32, swinging the momentum in Littler's favour. Littler went on to win all of the remaining six legs, completing a 5–1 victory with a 13-dart break of throw on double 5. Speaking afterwards, Littler emphasised the importance of the 140 checkout in the fourth set in changing the match, remarking that it "felt like a 170 [checkout]" and that it "killed Jonny [Clayton] off a little".

=== Final ===
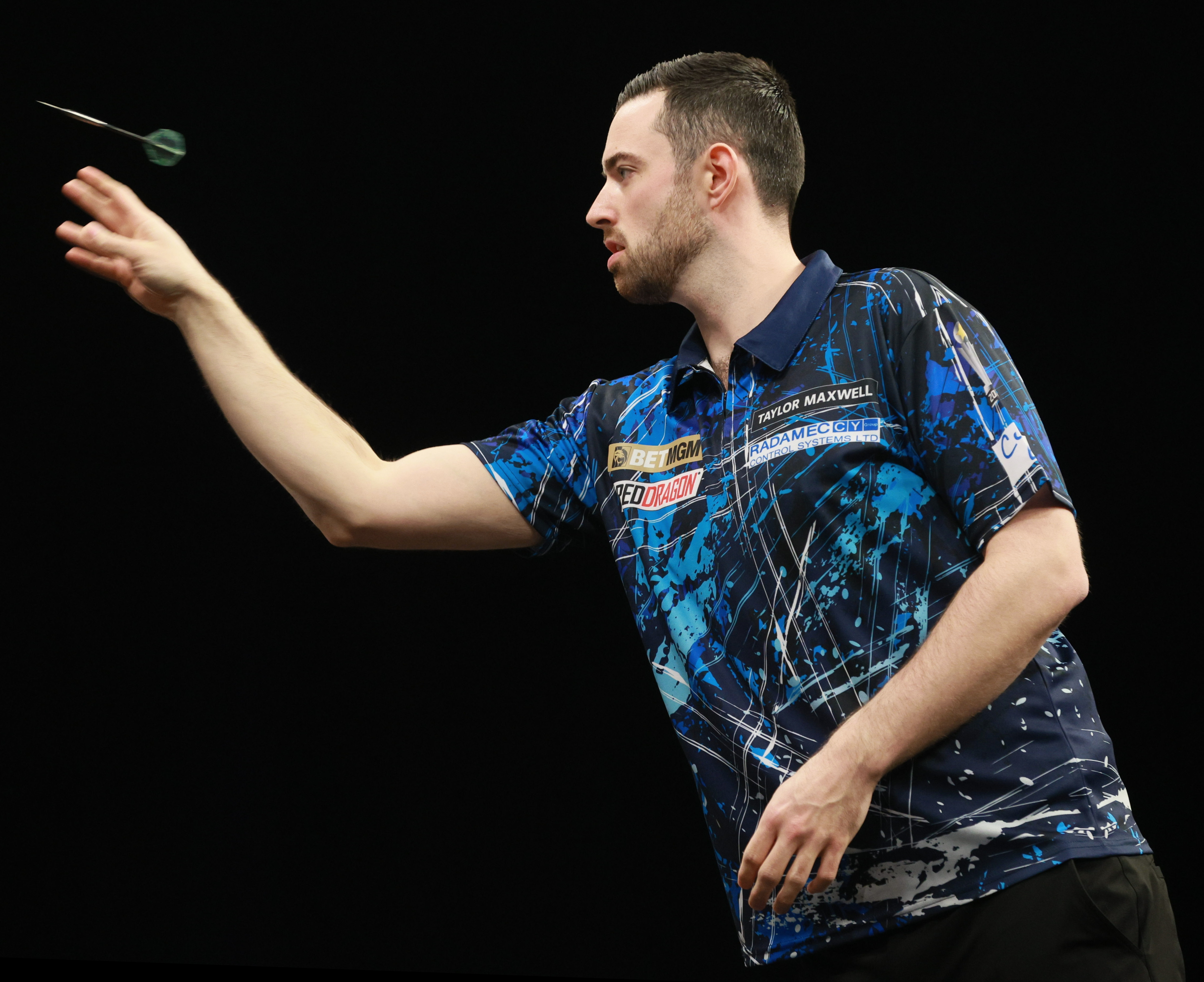
World number one Luke Humphries (pictured) reached his third consecutive World Grand Prix final.

The final between Luke Humphries and Luke Littler, the world numbers one and two, was played on 12 October. Humphries contested his third consecutive World Grand Prix final, after winning the 2023 tournament, his first PDC major title, and losing the 2024 final to Mike De Decker. He became the third player to reach three consecutive finals at the event, joining Phil Taylor and Michael van Gerwen. Littler contested his first World Grand Prix final, having lost to Rob Cross in the first round in his debut the previous year. Littler entered the match having won 14 of the pair's 24 previous meetings. It was the third time in 2025—sixth overall—that the two players had met in a televised final, with Humphries claiming victory in the Premier League final while Littler triumphed at the New Zealand Darts Masters. "I owe him one for the Premier League [final defeat]," said Littler, who also hoped that he could "be on [Humphries's] back for that world number one spot". Humphries insisted that he was "going to make it tough for Luke [Littler]", adding: "I'm experienced enough to know that I can cope under pressure, and hopefully it goes my way."

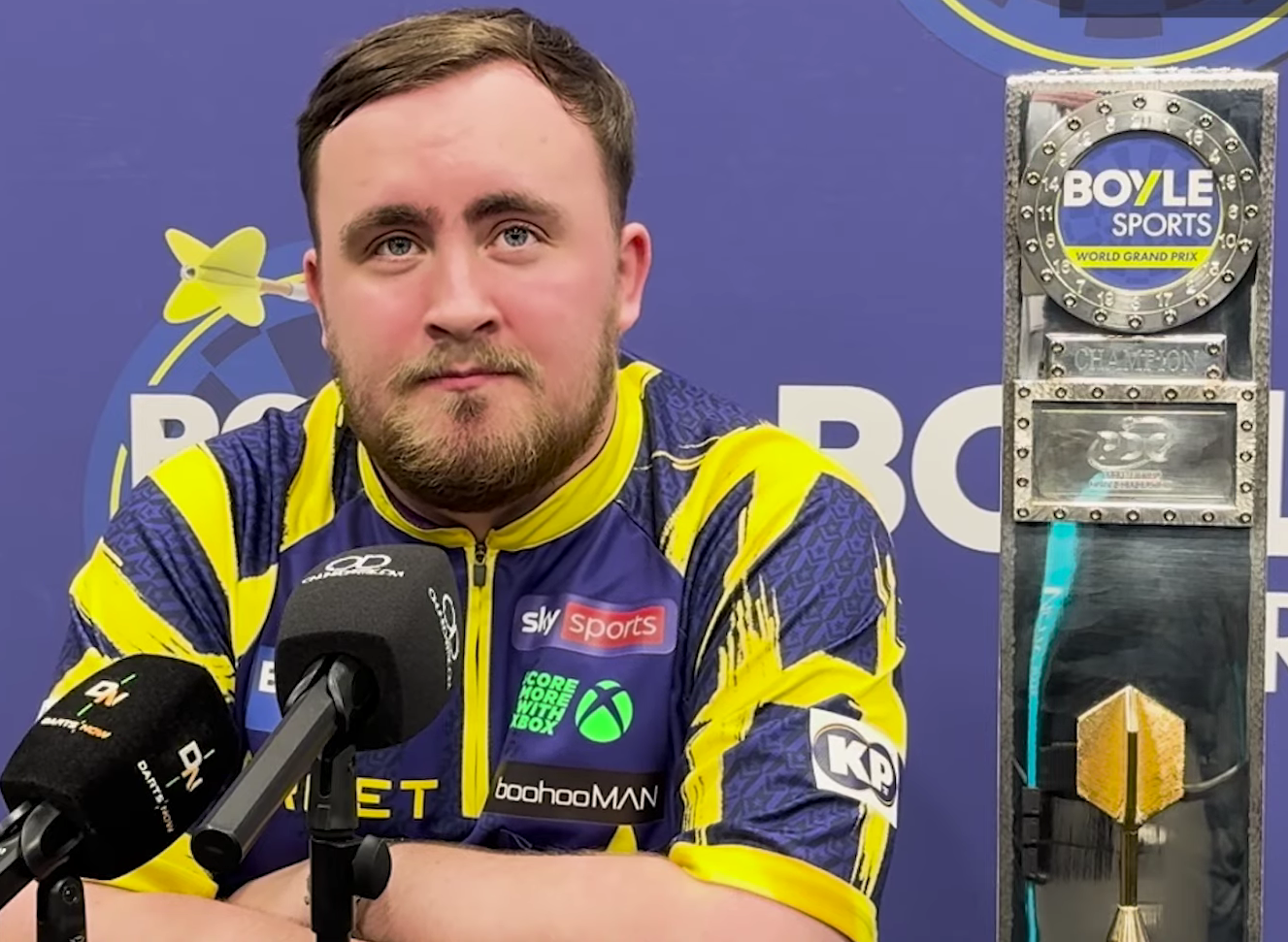
Reigning world champion Luke Littler (pictured with the trophy) won the event for the first time in his second appearance.

Littler opened the final by winning the first leg with a hold of throw, but struggled to double in during the second, beginning his scoring with his 13th dart. The pair exchanged breaks of throw in the third and fourth but Littler took the opening set in a deciding leg. In the second set, Humphries went 2–0 down but found his way back with legs of 13 and 11 darts, only for Littler to score 177 to leave a 64 checkout, which he would take out to establish a two-set lead. Littler began the third set by missing the bullseye for a nine-dart finish that would have seen him become the fourth player to achieve the feat at the event, before winning the set with a 104 checkout. Humphries converted 149 and 110 finishes to come close to claiming the fourth set, but Littler fought back to steal it in a decider; Littler won all of the first four sets in last-leg deciders. Humphries avoided a complete whitewash in sets as he converted a 154 checkout to make it 4–1. However, Littler restored his four-set lead by winning the sixth before securing the title in the seventh, pinning double 20 in another last-leg decider, meaning he won five out of his six sets in deciders. Humphries ended the match with a higher three-dart average and more maximums, averaging 93.61 with ten scores of 180, as opposed to Littler's average of 92.15 with eight 180s.

Littler won the World Grand Prix for the first time, marking his fourth major title won in 2025—after the 2025 World Championship, UK Open and World Matchplay—and his seventh PDC major title overall, while Humphries finished as runner-up for the second straight year. The pair won 15 of the last 21 major titles between them since Humphries won his first at the 2023 World Grand Prix. The victory meant that Littler closed in further on taking Humphries's world number one spot on the PDC Order of Merit, taking him to within £70,000 of becoming the highest-ranked player in the organisation for the first time. Littler, who revealed that he would be taking part in the PDC World Youth Championship the following day, expressed that he was "very happy to tick [the World Grand Prix] off" his list of achievements, leaving only the European Championship, Players Championship Finals and World Masters for him to win to complete the set of major singles titles in the PDC. Commenting on the race for world number one, Littler noted that £70,000 was "not a lot of prize money" to make up and that Humphries will know he would be "behind his back now". "Double 16 was my friend for the last three years and tonight it wasn’t," Humphries stated disappointingly, striving to practice harder to match his opponent's levels in the future.

== Schedule ==
Monday, 6 October

Match #	Round	Player 1	Score	Player 2	Set 1	Set 2	Set 3
01	1	Rob Cross 81.73	2–1	Wessel Nijman 84.60	3–2	2–3	3–2
02	1	Martin Schindler 94.71	0–2	Krzysztof Ratajski 95.94	0–3	1–3	—N/a
03	1	Chris Dobey 74.45	0–2	Cameron Menzies 84.24	0–3	2–3	—N/a
04	1	James Wade 84.62	0–2	Joe Cullen 85.26	0–3	2–3	—N/a
05	1	Danny Noppert 85.94	2–1	Jermaine Wattimena 81.97	0–3	3–1	3–2
06	1	Luke Humphries 87.64	2–0	Nathan Aspinall 80.83	3–2	3–0	—N/a
07	1	Gary Anderson 90.06	2–1	Raymond van Barneveld 86.22	3–1	1–3	3–2
08	1	Stephen Bunting 97.02	2–0	Niko Springer 91.22	3–0	3–2	—N/a

Tuesday, 7 October

Match #	Round	Player 1	Score	Player 2	Set 1	Set 2	Set 3
09	1	Damon Heta 84.98	1–2	Luke Woodhouse 80.98	0–3	3–0	2–3
10	1	Ross Smith 78.36	0–2	Daryl Gurney 84.86	0–3	1–3	—N/a
11	1	Jonny Clayton 88.37	2–0	Andrew Gilding 86.49	3–1	3–2	—N/a
12	1	Gerwyn Price 89.31	2–1	Ryan Searle 88.34	0–3	3–2	3–1
13	1	Luke Littler 105.58	2–0	Gian van Veen 106.47	3–2	3–0	—N/a
14	1	Michael van Gerwen 88.67	0–2	Dirk van Duijvenbode 86.54	0–3	2–3	—N/a
15	1	Peter Wright 80.22	1–2	Mike De Decker 91.41	3–1	1–3	1–3
16	1	Josh Rock 85.21	2–1	Ryan Joyce 84.69	1–3	3–1	3–2

Wednesday, 8 October

Match #	Round	Player 1	Score	Player 2	Set 1	Set 2	Set 3	Set 4	Set 5
17	2	Cameron Menzies 84.45	3–1	Rob Cross 81.27	3–2	3–0	2–3	3–2	—N/a
18	2	Stephen Bunting 85.67	1–3	Danny Noppert 85.55	2–3	2–3	3–0	2–3	—N/a
19	2	Luke Humphries 95.58	3–1	Krzysztof Ratajski 90.21	3–0	3–2	1–3	3–1	—N/a
20	2	Joe Cullen 68.05	0–3	Gary Anderson 87.54	0–3	0–3	1–3	—N/a	

Thursday, 9 October

Match #	Round	Player 1	Score	Player 2	Set 1	Set 2	Set 3	Set 4	Set 5
21	2	Dirk van Duijvenbode 96.40	3–0	Daryl Gurney 82.69	3–0	3–0	3–2	—N/a	
22	2	Jonny Clayton 85.67	3–1	Luke Woodhouse 80.28	3–1	0–3	3–1	3–1	—N/a
23	2	Luke Littler 91.86	3–0	Mike De Decker 74.22	3–1	3–1	3–0	—N/a	
24	2	Gerwyn Price 92.46	3–0	Josh Rock 82.50	3–1	3–0	3–0	—N/a	

Friday, 10 October

Match #	Round	Player 1	Score	Player 2	Set 1	Set 2	Set 3	Set 4	Set 5
25	QF	Danny Noppert 91.91	3–1	Gary Anderson 92.35	2–3	3–1	3–2	3–2	—N/a
26	QF	Dirk van Duijvenbode 84.14	0–3	Jonny Clayton 90.75	1–3	0–3	0–3	—N/a	
27	QF	Luke Littler 84.68	3–2	Gerwyn Price 83.40	1–3	0–3	3–0	3–2	3–2
28	QF	Luke Humphries 91.50	3–1	Cameron Menzies 87.44	3–0	1–3	3–1	3–0	—N/a

Saturday, 11 October

Match #	Round	Player 1	Score	Player 2	Set 1	Set 2	Set 3	Set 4	Set 5	Set 6	Set 7	Set 8	Set 9
29	SF	Luke Humphries 93.65	5–3	Danny Noppert 87.71	3–0	3–2	3–0	2–3	3–2	1–3	1–3	3–1	—N/a
30	SF	Luke Littler 97.26	5–1	Jonny Clayton 91.13	3–1	3–1	1–3	3–2	3–0	3–0	—N/a		

Sunday, 12 October

Match #	Round	Player 1	Score	Player 2	Set 1	Set 2	Set 3	Set 4	Set 5	Set 6	Set 7	Set 8	Set 9	Set 10	Set 11
31	F	Luke Humphries 93.61	1–6	Luke Littler 92.15	2–3	2–3	2–3	2–3	3–1	1–3	2–3	—N/a			

== Draw ==
The draw was confirmed on 29 September. Numbers to the left of a player's name show the seedings for the top 16 in the tournament. The figures to the right of a player's name state their three-dart average in a match. Players in bold denote match winners.

**First round** (best of 3 sets); 6–7 October
**1**	**Luke Humphries 87.64**	**2**
Nathan Aspinall 80.83	0
16	Martin Schindler 94.71	0
**Krzysztof Ratajski 95.94**	**2**
8	Chris Dobey 74.45	0
**Cameron Menzies 84.24**	**2**
**9**	**Rob Cross 81.73**	**2**
Wessel Nijman 84.60	1
**4**	**Stephen Bunting 97.02**	**2**
Niko Springer 91.22	0
**13**	**Danny Noppert 85.94**	**2**
Jermaine Wattimena 81.97	1
5	James Wade 84.62	0
**Joe Cullen 85.26**	**2**
**12**	**Gary Anderson 90.06**	**2**
Raymond van Barneveld 86.22	1
**2**	**Luke Littler 105.58**	**2**
Gian van Veen 106.47	0
15	Peter Wright 80.22	1
**Mike De Decker 91.41**	**2**
**7**	**Gerwyn Price 89.31**	**2**
Ryan Searle 88.34	1
**10**	**Josh Rock 85.21**	**2**
Ryan Joyce 84.69	1
3	Michael van Gerwen 88.67	0
**Dirk van Duijvenbode 86.54**	**2**
14	Ross Smith 78.36	0
**Daryl Gurney 84.86**	**2**
**6**	**Jonny Clayton 88.37**	**2**
Andrew Gilding 86.49	0
11	Damon Heta 84.98	1
**Luke Woodhouse 80.98**	**2**

**Second round** (best of 5 sets); 8–9 October
**1**	**Luke Humphries 95.58**	**3**
Krzysztof Ratajski 90.21	1
**Cameron Menzies 84.45**	**3**
9	Rob Cross 81.27	1
4	Stephen Bunting 85.67	1
**13**	**Danny Noppert 85.55**	**3**
Joe Cullen 68.05	0
**12**	**Gary Anderson 87.54**	**3**
**2**	**Luke Littler 91.86**	**3**
Mike De Decker 74.22	0
**7**	**Gerwyn Price 92.46**	**3**
10	Josh Rock 82.50	0
**Dirk van Duijvenbode 96.40**	**3**
Daryl Gurney 82.69	0
**6**	**Jonny Clayton 85.67**	**3**
Luke Woodhouse 80.28	1

**Quarter-finals** (best of 5 sets); 10 October
**1**	**Luke Humphries 91.50**	**3**
Cameron Menzies 87.44	1
**13**	**Danny Noppert 91.91**	**3**
12	Gary Anderson 92.35	1
**2**	**Luke Littler 84.68**	**3**
7	Gerwyn Price 83.40	2
Dirk van Duijvenbode 84.14	0
**6**	**Jonny Clayton 90.75**	**3**

**Semi-finals** (best of 9 sets); 11 October
**1**	**Luke Humphries 93.65**	**5**
13	Danny Noppert 87.71	3
**2**	**Luke Littler 97.26**	**5**
6	Jonny Clayton 91.13	1

**Final** (best of 11 sets); 12 October
1	Luke Humphries 93.61	1
**2**	**Luke Littler 92.15**	**6**

=== Final ===
Best of 11 sets Referee: Kirk Bevins; Mattioli Arena, Leicester, England, 12 October 2025
Luke Humphries (1)	1–**6**	**Luke Littler** (2)
2–**3**, 2–**3**, 2–**3**, 2–**3**, **3**–1, 1–**3**, 2–**3**
93.61	Three-dart average	92.15
70	100+ scores	67
32	140+ scores	31
10	180 scores	8
154	Highest checkout	116
3	Checkouts 100+	3
14/29 (48.3%)	Checkout percentage	19/40 (47.5%)
33/81 (40.7%)	Double in percentage	33/85 (38.8%)

== Top averages ==
The table lists all players who achieved a three-dart average of at least 100 in a match.

#	Player	Round	Average	Result	Ref
1	Gian van Veen	1	106.47	Lost	
2	Luke Littler	1	105.58	Won	
