= World Grand Prix (darts) =

PDC darts tournament

- Founded: 1998
- First season: 1998
- Organizing body: Professional Darts Corporation (PDC)
- Country: United Kingdom
- Venues: Leicester Arena, Leicester
- Most recent champion: Luke Humphries (2026)
- Tournament format: Sets "double in, double out"

The World Grand Prix (known for sponsorship reasons as the BoyleSports World Grand Prix) is a professional darts tournament that has been held at the Leicester Arena in Leicester, England since 2021. The tournament was traditionally held in Dublin, Ireland every October. It is played in Sets format, and is run by the Professional Darts Corporation (PDC). The tournament is the only one in the PDC which currently uses the "double in, double out" format.

The current champion is Luke Humphries, who defeated Gerwyn Price 6–4 in the 2026 final to win his second World Grand Prix title.

The tournament's original venue was the Casino Rooms in Rochester, Kent in 1998 and 1999, and then for one year only in 2000 at the Crosbie Cedars Hotel in Rosslare, County Wexford. In 2001, the tournament moved further north to the Citywest in Dublin. In 2009, the tournament moved from the Reception Hall at the main Citywest Hotel, to the newly completed bigger venue on site, the Citywest Hotel Convention Centre. In 2012, the tournament moved back to the Reception Hall for that year, before returning to the Convention Centre in 2013. Due to the COVID-19 pandemic, the 2020 tournament was held at the Coventry Arena, Coventry, and since 2021, it has been held at the Leicester Arena. When the World Grand Prix was founded in 1998, it replaced the earlier World Pairs tournament which ran from 1995 to 1997.

The World Grand Prix was sponsored by bookmakers Paddy Power from 2001 to 2003, before Sky Bet took over in 2004. The subsidiary Sky Poker was the tournament's sponsor in 2008. In 2010, online gambling company Bodog became the event's title sponsor, while PartyPoker.com took over as the main sponsor in 2011. In 2016, Unibet took over as sponsor, with BoyleSports sponsoring the event since 2019.

Although he dominated the event with 11 title wins, Phil Taylor was also beaten in the first round five times.

== History ==
=== Tournament format ===
The tournament is unique as it is the only event in the PDC darts calendar that uses the "double in, double out" format, in which players must start on a double or the bullseye to start scoring and do the same to win a leg. The inaugural edition in 1998 featured matches consisting of sets played to the best of three legs, with Phil Taylor winning the final 13–8 against Rod Harrington. The following year this changed to best of five legs per set. Furthermore, a group stage was introduced in 1999, with there only being four seeded players for the event, all of whom reached the semi-finals. In 2000, the tournament reverted to being a straight knock-out and has remained so ever since.

The double-start format also makes landing a perfect nine-dart finish even more difficult, as it limits the number of combinations and guarantees that a player must finish on the bullseye (unless they start with one). There were two famous near misses in the first two years, the first with Phil Taylor in the 1998 final against Rod Harrington, when Taylor was distracted by loud commentary from Sid Waddell just before throwing the eighth dart (which Taylor hit) before he missed the bullseye; and the second in the 1999 semi final, when Harrington missed the bullseye against Taylor.

Brendan Dolan became the first player to hit a double-start nine-dart finish, achieving the feat in his match against James Wade at the 2011 World Grand Prix; Wade and Robert Thornton both hit nine-darters in their match at the 2014 event, the first time this happened in any televised event. On all three occasions, the leg started with a score of 160 (starting on double 20), followed by 180, followed by finishing 161 with treble 20, treble 17, and bullseye.

=== Location ===
After first serving as host venue for the 2001 event, the Citywest Hotel in Dublin became the regular home of the tournament. In 2020, amidst the COVID-19 pandemic, the World Grand Prix was relocated to England due to the Citywest being used for health services, with the event being held in Leicester since 2021.

== World Grand Prix Finals ==
Year	Champion (average in final)	Score	Runner-up (average in final)	Prize money			Sponsor	Venue
Year	Champion (average in final)	Score	Runner-up (average in final)	Total	Champion	Runner-up	Sponsor	Venue
1998	(England) Phil Taylor (94.61)	13–8	(England) Rod Harrington (86.64)	£38,000	£9,000	£5,000	PDC	Casino Rooms, Rochester
1999	(England) Phil Taylor (92.59)	6–1	(England) Shayne Burgess (81.26)	£38,000	£9,000	£5,000	PDC	Casino Rooms, Rochester
2000	(England) Phil Taylor (91.32)	6–1	(England) Shayne Burgess (81.48)	£70,000	£15,000	£7,500	PDC	Crosbie Cedars Hotel, Rosslare
2001	(England) Alan Warriner (83.52)	8–2	(Netherlands) Roland Scholten (81.84)	£78,000	£15,000	£7,500	Paddy Power	Citywest Hotel, Dublin; Reception Hall (2001–2008, 2012); Convention Centre (2009–2011, 2013–2019)
2002	(England) Phil Taylor (100.17)	7–3	(Canada) John Part (88.62)	£70,000	£14,000	£7,000	Paddy Power	Citywest Hotel, Dublin; Reception Hall (2001–2008, 2012); Convention Centre (2009–2011, 2013–2019)
2003	(England) Phil Taylor (94.80)	7–2	(Canada) John Part (83.25)	£76,000	£15,000	£7,500	Paddy Power	Citywest Hotel, Dublin; Reception Hall (2001–2008, 2012); Convention Centre (2009–2011, 2013–2019)
2004	(England) Colin Lloyd (85.29)	7–3	(England) Alan Warriner (77.91)	£100,000	£20,000	£10,000	Sky Bet	Citywest Hotel, Dublin; Reception Hall (2001–2008, 2012); Convention Centre (2009–2011, 2013–2019)
2005	(England) Phil Taylor (90.74)	7–1	(England) Colin Lloyd (82.05)	£100,000	£20,000	£10,000	Sky Bet	Citywest Hotel, Dublin; Reception Hall (2001–2008, 2012); Convention Centre (2009–2011, 2013–2019)
2006	(England) Phil Taylor (88.24)	7–4	(England) Terry Jenkins (82.51)	£130,000	£25,000	£12,500	Sky Bet	Citywest Hotel, Dublin; Reception Hall (2001–2008, 2012); Convention Centre (2009–2011, 2013–2019)
2007	(England) James Wade (86.03)	6–3	(England) Terry Jenkins (84.58)	£200,000	£50,000	£20,000	Sky Bet	Citywest Hotel, Dublin; Reception Hall (2001–2008, 2012); Convention Centre (2009–2011, 2013–2019)
2008	(England) Phil Taylor (97.81)	6–2	(Netherlands) Raymond van Barneveld (90.42)	£250,000	£50,000	£25,000	Sky Poker	Citywest Hotel, Dublin; Reception Hall (2001–2008, 2012); Convention Centre (2009–2011, 2013–2019)
2009	(England) Phil Taylor (97.07)	6–3	(Netherlands) Raymond van Barneveld (86.62)	£350,000	£100,000	£40,000	Sky Bet	Citywest Hotel, Dublin; Reception Hall (2001–2008, 2012); Convention Centre (2009–2011, 2013–2019)
2010	(England) James Wade (88.92)	6–3	(England) Adrian Lewis (89.33)	£350,000	£100,000	£40,000	Bodog	Citywest Hotel, Dublin; Reception Hall (2001–2008, 2012); Convention Centre (2009–2011, 2013–2019)
2011	(England) Phil Taylor (90.29)	6–3	(Northern Ireland) Brendan Dolan (84.68)	£350,000	£100,000	£40,000	PartyPoker.com	Citywest Hotel, Dublin; Reception Hall (2001–2008, 2012); Convention Centre (2009–2011, 2013–2019)
2012	(Netherlands) Michael van Gerwen (87.53)	6–4	(England) Mervyn King (81.96)	£350,000	£100,000	£40,000	PartyPoker.com	Citywest Hotel, Dublin; Reception Hall (2001–2008, 2012); Convention Centre (2009–2011, 2013–2019)
2013	(England) Phil Taylor (97.67)	6–0	(England) Dave Chisnall (81.29)	£350,000	£100,000	£40,000	PartyPoker.com	Citywest Hotel, Dublin; Reception Hall (2001–2008, 2012); Convention Centre (2009–2011, 2013–2019)
2014	(Netherlands) Michael van Gerwen (90.81)	5–3	(England) James Wade (89.26)	£400,000	£100,000	£45,000	PartyPoker.com	Citywest Hotel, Dublin; Reception Hall (2001–2008, 2012); Convention Centre (2009–2011, 2013–2019)
2015	(Scotland) Robert Thornton (90.79)	5–4	(Netherlands) Michael van Gerwen (96.79)	£400,000	£100,000	£45,000	PartyPoker.com	Citywest Hotel, Dublin; Reception Hall (2001–2008, 2012); Convention Centre (2009–2011, 2013–2019)
2016	(Netherlands) Michael van Gerwen (100.29)	5–2	(Scotland) Gary Anderson (92.73)	£400,000	£100,000	£45,000	Unibet	Citywest Hotel, Dublin; Reception Hall (2001–2008, 2012); Convention Centre (2009–2011, 2013–2019)
2017	(Northern Ireland) Daryl Gurney (88.50)	5–4	(Australia) Simon Whitlock (83.53)	£400,000	£100,000	£45,000	Unibet	Citywest Hotel, Dublin; Reception Hall (2001–2008, 2012); Convention Centre (2009–2011, 2013–2019)
2018	(Netherlands) Michael van Gerwen (88.85)	5–2	(Scotland) Peter Wright (91.61)	£400,000	£100,000	£45,000	Unibet	Citywest Hotel, Dublin; Reception Hall (2001–2008, 2012); Convention Centre (2009–2011, 2013–2019)
2019	(Netherlands) Michael van Gerwen (94.74)	5–2	(England) Dave Chisnall (93.32)	£450,000	£110,000	£50,000	BoyleSports	Citywest Hotel, Dublin; Reception Hall (2001–2008, 2012); Convention Centre (2009–2011, 2013–2019)
2020	(Wales) Gerwyn Price (88.19)	5–2	(Netherlands) Dirk van Duijvenbode (87.07)	£450,000	£110,000	£50,000	BoyleSports	Coventry Arena, Coventry
2021	(Wales) Jonny Clayton (94.44)	5–1	(Wales) Gerwyn Price (92.47)	£450,000	£110,000	£50,000	BoyleSports	Leicester Arena, Leicester
2022	(Netherlands) Michael van Gerwen (91.07)	5–3	(England) Nathan Aspinall (91.88)	£600,000	£120,000	£60,000	BoyleSports	Leicester Arena, Leicester
2023	(England) Luke Humphries (93.30)	5–2	(Wales) Gerwyn Price (91.00)	£600,000	£120,000	£60,000	BoyleSports	Leicester Arena, Leicester
2024	(Belgium) Mike De Decker (92.06)	6–4	(England) Luke Humphries (90.56)	£600,000	£120,000	£60,000	BoyleSports	Leicester Arena, Leicester
2025	(England) Luke Littler (92.15)	6–1	(England) Luke Humphries (93.61)	£600,000	£120,000	£60,000	BoyleSports	Leicester Arena, Leicester
2026	(England) Luke Humphries (93.16)	6–4	(Wales) Gerwyn Price (95.37)	£750,000	£150,000	£80,000	BoyleSports	Leicester Arena, Leicester

== Records and statistics ==
As of 4 October 2026

=== Total finalist appearances ===
Rank	Player	Nationality	Won	Runner-up	Finals	Appearances
1	Phil Taylor	England	11	0	11	19
2	**Michael van Gerwen**	Netherlands	6	1	7	16
3	**Luke Humphries**	England	2	2	4	6
4	**James Wade**	England	2	1	3	22
5	**Gerwyn Price**	Wales	1	3	4	12
6	Alan Warriner	England	1	1	2	9
6	Colin Lloyd	England	1	1	2	14
8	Robert Thornton	Scotland	1	0	1	8
8	**Daryl Gurney**	Northern Ireland	1	0	1	12
8	**Jonny Clayton**	Wales	1	0	1	9
8	**Mike De Decker**	Belgium	1	0	1	3
8	**Luke Littler**	England	1	0	1	3
13	Shayne Burgess	England	0	2	2	4
13	John Part	Canada	0	2	2	14
13	Terry Jenkins	England	0	2	2	12
13	**Raymond van Barneveld**	Netherlands	0	2	2	16
13	**Dave Chisnall**	England	0	2	2	15
18	Rod Harrington	England	0	1	1	5
18	Roland Scholten	Netherlands	0	1	1	9
18	Adrian Lewis	England	0	1	1	16
18	**Brendan Dolan**	Northern Ireland	0	1	1	15
18	**Mervyn King**	England	0	1	1	15
18	**Gary Anderson**	Scotland	0	1	1	17
18	**Simon Whitlock**	Australia	0	1	1	11
18	**Peter Wright**	Scotland	0	1	1	14
18	**Dirk van Duijvenbode**	Netherlands	0	1	1	6
18	**Nathan Aspinall**	England	0	1	1	8

- Active players are shown in **bold**
- Only players who reached the final are included
- In the event of identical records, players are sorted by date first achieved

=== Champions by country ===
Country	Players	Total	First title	Last title
England	6	18	1998	2026
Netherlands	1	6	2012	2022
Wales	2	2	2020	2021
Scotland	1	1	2015	2015
Northern Ireland	1	1	2017	2017
Belgium	1	1	2024	2024

=== Nine-dart finishes ===
Three nine-darters have been thrown at the World Grand Prix. The first one was in 2011, the other two happened in the same game in 2014, notable as being the only televised match which has had nine-darters from both players.

Player	Year (+ Round)	Method (double-in double-out)	Opponent	Result
(Northern Ireland) Brendan Dolan	2011, Semi-Final	D20, 2 x T20; 3 x T20; T20, T17, Bull	(England) James Wade	5–2
(England) James Wade	2014, 2nd Round	D20, 2 x T20; 3 x T20; T20, T17, Bull	(Scotland) Robert Thornton	3–2
(Scotland) Robert Thornton	2014, 2nd Round	D20, 2 x T20; 3 x T20; T20, T17, Bull	(England) James Wade	2–3

=== High averages ===
An average over 100 in a match in the World Grand Prix has been achieved 26 times, of which Phil Taylor is responsible for 9.

Ten highest World Grand Prix one-match averages
Average	Player	Year (+ Round)	Opponent	Result
106.47	(Netherlands) Gian van Veen	2025, 1st Round	(England) Luke Littler	0–2
106.45	(England) Alan Warriner	2001, 1st Round	(England) Andy Jenkins	2–0
105.58	(England) Luke Littler	2025, 1st Round	(Netherlands) Gian van Veen	2–0
105.15	(England) Nathan Aspinall	2026, Quarter-Final	(England) Ryan Joyce	3–0
104.86	(Scotland) Gary Anderson	2013, 1st Round	(Netherlands) Jelle Klaasen	2–0
104.47	(Netherlands) Michael van Gerwen	2013, 1st Round	(Canada) John Part	2–0
103.09	(Netherlands) Michael van Gerwen	2016, Quarter-Final	(Australia) Simon Whitlock	3–1
103.02	(England) Phil Taylor	2011, Semi-Final	(Wales) Richie Burnett	5–2
102.85	(England) Dave Chisnall	2020, 1st Round	(England) Glen Durrant	2–0
102.48	(England) Phil Taylor	2010, 1st Round	(Northern Ireland) Brendan Dolan	2–0

Five highest losing averages
Average	Player	Year (+ Round)	Opponent	Result
106.47	(Netherlands) Gian van Veen	2025, 1st Round	(England) Luke Littler	0–2
97.78	(England) Dave Chisnall	2018, Quarter-Final	(Netherlands) Michael van Gerwen	1–3
97.20	(Scotland) Gary Anderson	2015, 2nd Round	(England) Ian White	1–3
97.03	(England) Phil Taylor	2015, 1st Round	(Netherlands) Vincent van der Voort	0–2
96.84	(Netherlands) Michael van Gerwen	2020, Quarter-Final	(Australia) Simon Whitlock	0–3

Different players with a 100+ match average – updated 07/10/25
Player	Total	Highest Av.	Year (+ Round)
(England) Phil Taylor	9	103.02	2011, Semi-Final
(Netherlands) Michael van Gerwen	4	104.47	2013, 1st Round
(England) Dave Chisnall	2	102.85	2020, 1st Round
(Wales) Gerwyn Price	2	101.61	2026, 1st Round
(Australia) Simon Whitlock	2	101.12	2020, 1st Round
(Netherlands) Gian van Veen	1	106.47	2025, 1st Round
(England) Alan Warriner	1	106.45	2001, 1st Round
(England) Luke Littler	1	105.58	2025, 1st Round
(England) Nathan Aspinall	1	105.15	2026, Quarter-Final
(Scotland) Gary Anderson	1	104.86	2013, 1st Round
(England) Ross Smith	1	101.79	2024, 1st Round
(England) Luke Humphries	1	100.30	2024, Semi-Final

Five highest tournament averages (min 3 matches)
Average	Player	Year
99.46	(Netherlands) Michael van Gerwen	2016
99.23	(England) Phil Taylor	2010
98.62	(England) Phil Taylor	2009
98.50	(England) Phil Taylor	2008
98.22	(England) Phil Taylor	2012

== World Team Championship ==
The World Team Championship event which preceded the introduction of this event was held between 1995 and 1997.

Year	Winners	Score	Runners up	Venue
1995	(England) Eric Bristow (England) Dennis Priestley	14–9 (legs)	(England) Keith Deller (Scotland) Jamie Harvey	Butlin's Wonder West World, Ayr
1996	(England) Bob Anderson (England) Phil Taylor	18–15 (legs)	(England) Chris Mason (England) Steve Raw	Willows Variety Centre, Salford
1997	(Netherlands) Raymond van Barneveld (Netherlands) Roland Scholten	18–15 (legs)	(Wales) Richie Burnett (England) Rod Harrington	Butlin's South Coast World, Bognor Regis

== Media coverage ==
The World Grand Prix has been broadcast in the UK by Sky Sports since the first tournament.
