= 2001 World Grand Prix (darts) =

2001 Paddy Power World Grand Prix

Tournament information
- Dates: 24–28 October 2001
- Venue: Citywest Hotel
- Location: Dublin, Ireland
- Organisation(s): Professional Darts Corporation (PDC)
- Format: Sets "double in, double out"
- Prize fund: £78,000
- Winner's share: £15,000
- High checkout: 164 Roland Scholten

Champion(s)
- Alan Warriner (ENG)

The 2001 Paddy Power World Grand Prix was the fourth staging of the World Grand Prix darts tournament, organised by the Professional Darts Corporation. It was held at the Citywest Hotel in Dublin, Ireland, from 24 to 28 October 2001. This was the first World Grand Prix to be held at the Citywest Hotel, while Paddy Power was the tournament's first sponsor.

Phil Taylor, the winner of the three previous stagings of the tournament, lost to Kevin Painter in the first round; this was Painter's sole win against Taylor in 33 professional meetings. The final was contested between Alan Warriner and Roland Scholten, with Warriner winning 8–2. In his first-round win over Andy Jenkins, Warriner averaged 106.45 – a record for a televised match with a double start which stood until it was surpassed by Gian van Veen at the 2025 World Grand Prix.

== Prize money ==
Position (num. of players)		Prize money (Total: £78,000)
Winner	(1)	£15,000
Runner-Up	(1)	£7,500
Semi-finalists	(2)	£4,350
Quarter-finalists	(4)	£3,000
Second round losers	(8)	£1,850
First round losers	(16)	£1,250

== Seeds ==
There were eight seeds for the competition.

1. (England) Peter Manley
2. (England) Alan Warriner
3. (England) Phil Taylor
4. (England) Rod Harrington
5. (Canada) John Part
6. (England) Dennis Priestley
7. (England) Dave Askew
8. (England) Steve Beaton

== Results ==
Players in bold denote match winners.

**First round** (best of 3 sets); 24–25 October
1	(England) Peter Manley 84.70	1
(England) **Martin Adams** 91.24	**2**
(England) **Alex Roy** 81.35	**2**
(United States) Steve Brown 75.80	1
8	(England) **Steve Beaton** 90.06	**2**
(England) Ronnie Baxter 87.25	1
(England) **John Lowe** 81.25	**2**
(England) Cliff Lazarenko 75.88	1
5	(Canada) **John Part** 84.51	**2**
(England) Colin Lloyd 74.58	0
(England) **Denis Ovens** 69.13	**2**
(Scotland) George McLean 56.09	0
4	(England) Rod Harrington 74.06	0
(Netherlands) **Roland Scholten** 83.79	**2**
(England) Kit Young 68.29	0
(England) **Mick Manning** 78.08	**2**
2	(England) **Alan Warriner** 106.45	**2**
(England) Andy Jenkins 82.38	0
(England) **Shayne Burgess** 79.66	**2**
(England) Peter Evison 78.31	1
7	(England) **Dave Askew** 80.83	**2**
(Republic of Ireland) Keith Rooney 76.63	0
(England) **Ian Cullingworth** 75.58	**2**
(England) Chris Bowring 73.51	0
6	(England) Dennis Priestley 87.47	0
(England) **Dennis Smith** 82.79	**2**
(Northern Ireland) Francis McMahon 52.02	0
(England) **Keith Deller** 69.18	**2**
3	(England) Phil Taylor 82.61	1
(England) **Kevin Painter** 87.41	**2**
(England) Doug McCarthy 68.82	0
(Wales) **Richie Burnett** 85.31	**2**

**Second round** (best of 5 sets); 26 October
(England) **Martin Adams** 95.35	**3**
(England) Alex Roy 69.71	0
8	(England) Steve Beaton 85.61	1
(England) **John Lowe** 86.27	**3**
5	(Canada) **John Part** 94.14	**3**
(England) Denis Ovens 90.43	1
(Netherlands) **Roland Scholten** 86.00	**3**
(England) Mick Manning 80.15	0
2	(England) **Alan Warriner** 89.91	**3**
(England) Shayne Burgess 81.13	1
7	(England) **Dave Askew** 87.36	**3**
(England) Ian Cullingworth 77.98	0
(England) **Dennis Smith** 80.65	**3**
(England) Keith Deller 77.26	0
(England) **Kevin Painter** 90.85	**3**
(Wales) Richie Burnett 79.50	0

**Quarter-finals** (best of 11 sets); 27 October
(England) Martin Adams 85.46	5
(England) **John Lowe** 82.82	**6**
5	(Canada) John Part 86.87	3
(Netherlands) **Roland Scholten** 87.65	**6**
2	(England) **Alan Warriner** 78.32	**6**
(England) Dave Askew 70.76	2
(England) **Dennis Smith** 88.22	**6**
(England) Kevin Painter 80.40	1

**Semi-finals** (best of 13 sets); 28 October
(England) John Lowe 80.17	1
(Netherlands) **Roland Scholten** 85.24	**7**
2	(England) **Alan Warriner** 81.50	**7**
(England) Dennis Smith 82.78	5

**Final** (best of 15 sets); 28 October
(Netherlands) Roland Scholten 81.84	2
2	(England) **Alan Warriner** 83.52	**8**
