= 2022 Dutch Darts Masters =

2022 Viaplay Dutch Darts Masters

Tournament information
- Dates: 24–25 June 2022
- Venue: Ziggo Dome
- Location: Amsterdam
- Country: Netherlands
- Organisation(s): PDC
- Format: Legs
- Prize fund: £60,000
- Winner's share: £20,000
- High checkout: 170 Dimitri Van den Bergh

Champion(s)
- Dimitri Van den Bergh

The 2022 Viaplay Dutch Darts Masters was the first staging of the tournament by the Professional Darts Corporation, and the third entry in the 2022 World Series of Darts. The tournament featured 16 players (eight PDC players and eight Dutch qualifiers) and was held at the Ziggo Dome in Amsterdam, Netherlands on 24–25 June 2022.

Dimitri Van den Bergh won his second consecutive World Series title after defeating Dirk van Duijvenbode 8–2 in the final.

== Prize money ==
The total prize fund was £60,000.

Position (no. of players)		Prize money (Total: £60,000)
Winner	(1)	£20,000
Runner-up	(1)	£10,000
Semi-finalists	(2)	£5,000
Quarter-finalists	(4)	£2,500
First round	(8)	£1,250

== Qualifiers ==
On the announcement of the tournament on 11 April, the PDC confirmed the 8 players who would be their 'elite' representatives at the event, including Fallon Sherrock, who was denied her chance to appear on the 2020 World Series of Darts circuit, owing to the COVID-19 pandemic.

The seedings were based on the results from previous World Series events held earlier in the year.

1. Michael Smith (first round)
2. Dimitri Van den Bergh (champion)
3. Michael van Gerwen (first round)
4. James Wade (semi-finals)
5. Peter Wright (first round)
6. Gerwyn Price (first round)
7. Fallon Sherrock (first round)
8. Jonny Clayton (first round)

The Dutch qualifiers consisted of the eight PDC Tour Card holders who were the highest ranked on the PDC Order of Merit on 31 May 2022:

- Danny Noppert (semi-finals)
- Dirk van Duijvenbode (runner-up)
- Vincent van der Voort (quarter-finals)
- Jermaine Wattimena (quarter-finals)
- Martijn Kleermaker (quarter-finals)
- Jeffrey de Zwaan (first round)
- Maik Kuivenhoven (quarter-finals)
- Ron Meulenkamp (first round)

== Draw ==
The draw was made on 23 June by Rod Harrington.

First round (best of 11 legs); 24 June
1	Michael Smith 91.33	4
Martijn Kleermaker 96.46	6
Peter Wright 95.63	3
Dirk van Duijvenbode 95.44	6
4	James Wade 90.14	6
Jeffrey de Zwaan 89.33	2
Fallon Sherrock 73.84	1
Maik Kuivenhoven 86.04	6
2	Dimitri Van den Bergh 94.51	6
Ron Meulenkamp 87.33	2
Jonny Clayton 94.96	5
Jermaine Wattimena 93.51	6
3	Michael van Gerwen 96.78	4
Danny Noppert 97.90	6
Gerwyn Price 91.63	5
Vincent van der Voort 96.07	6

Quarter-finals (best of 11 legs); 25 June
Martijn Kleermaker 93.34	4
Dirk van Duijvenbode 89.31	6
4	James Wade 98.04	6
Maik Kuivenhoven 97.75	4
2	Dimitri Van den Bergh 98.56	6
Jermaine Wattimena 94.79	1
Danny Noppert 94.46	6
Vincent van der Voort 90.44	5

Semi-finals (best of 13 legs); 25 June
Dirk van Duijvenbode 97.75	7
4	James Wade 96.30	6
2	Dimitri Van den Bergh 103.56	7
Danny Noppert 95.28	2

Final (best of 15 legs); 25 June
Dirk van Duijvenbode 94.01	2
2	Dimitri Van den Bergh 104.60	8
