= Dirk van Duijvenbode =

Dutch darts player (born 1992)

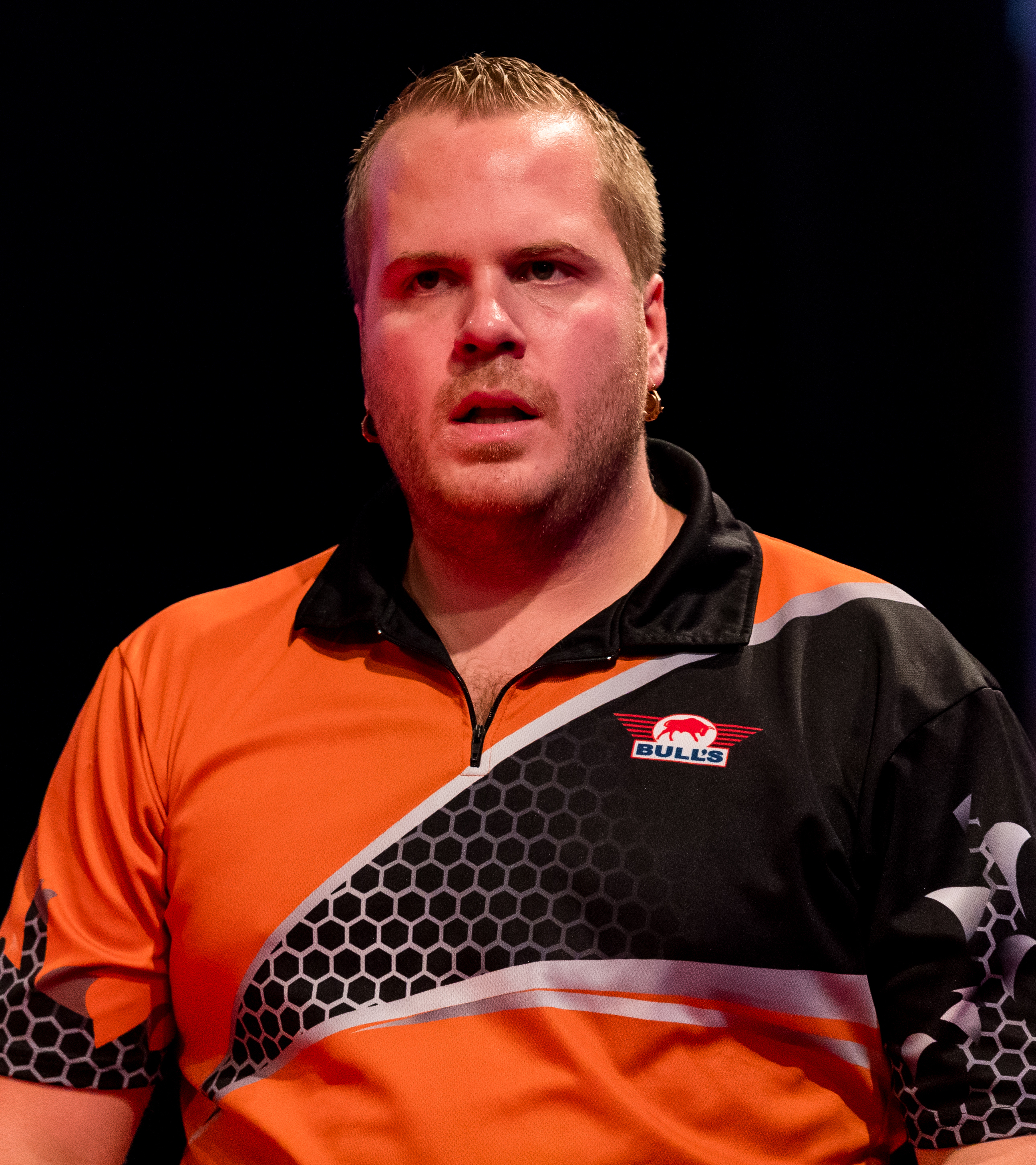
- Van Duijvenbode in 2019

Personal information
- Nicknames: "Aubergenius" "The Titan"
- Born: 30 June 1992 (age 34) Katwijk aan Zee, Netherlands
- Home town: 's-Gravenzande, Netherlands

Sport
- Sport: Darts
- Playing since: 2006
- Darts: 23g Bull's NL Signature
- Laterality: Right-handed
- Walk-on music: "Just Like You" by Radical Redemption

Organisation (see split in darts)
- BDO: 2010–2011
- PDC: 2011–present (Tour Card: 2016–present)
- Current world ranking: (PDC) 21 ▲1 (5 November 2026)

PDC premier events – best performances
- World Championship: Quarter-final: 2021
- World Matchplay: Semi-final: 2026
- World Grand Prix: Runner-up: 2020
- UK Open: Last 16: 2022
- Grand Slam: Last 16: 2022
- European Championship: Semi-final: 2022
- PC Finals: Semi-final: 2024
- Masters: Quarter-final: 2023
- World Series Finals: Runner-up: 2022

Other tournament wins
- Years
Players Championships (x6)
| 2021, 2022 (x2), 2023 (x3) |

Dirk van Duijvenbode (born 30 June 1992) is a Dutch professional darts player who competes in Professional Darts Corporation (PDC) events, where he reached a peak ranking of world number ten in 2023. A PDC Tour Card holder since 2016, Van Duijvenbode has won six PDC ranking titles in Players Championship events. He was the runner-up at the 2020 World Grand Prix and 2022 World Series of Darts Finals, losing to Gerwyn Price in the final on both occasions. He has also finished as runner-up in three events on the PDC European Tour. Nicknamed "the Titan" or the "Aubergenius", he is known for his energetic walk-on, combined with hardstyle music.

== Career ==
=== Early career: 2011–2017 ===
In 2011, van Duijvenbode reached the final of a German PDC Youth Tour event, losing 2–4 against Paul Barham. In 2013, he won through to the final of two Challenge Tour events but was beaten 1–4 by Rowby-John Rodriguez and 3–4 by Jan Dekker.

Van Duijvenbode began playing in main PDC events in 2014 and qualified for the German Darts Championship, where he beat Brian Woods 6–3 before losing 5–6 to Wes Newton, having been 5–3 ahead. He reached the quarter-finals of a PDC event for the first time at the fourth UK Open Qualifier by defeating Robert Thornton 6–4, but then lost by a reverse of this scoreline to Brendan Dolan. At the UK Open itself he beat John Bowles 5–1 and, despite at one time holding a 7–4 lead over Joe Murnan in third round, was then edged out 8–9. Van Duijvenbode progressed to the semi-finals of the World Youth Championship, but lost 2–6 against Keegan Brown. He was defeated 1–5 by Colin Fowler in the final of the penultimate Challenge Tour event of the year.

In 2015, van Duijvenbode hit his first nine-dart finish during the third Development Tour event after he wired double 12 for a perfect leg in his previous match. His first quarter-final of the year on the main tour came at the 12th Players Championship where he lost 2–6 to Michael Smith. Van Duijvenbode made his debut at the European Championship, but was knocked out 2–6 by Justin Pipe in the first round.

Van Duijvenbode made his first appearance in the PDC World Championship in the 2016 event and lost the first set against compatriot Raymond van Barneveld in the first round. The next went to a deciding leg, but when van Duijvenbode was on 180 he hit three treble 20s to bust his score and could not win another leg in a 3–0 loss. At the UK Open he enjoyed wins over Michael McFall, Peter Hudson and Robbie Green to play in the fourth round and was defeated 4–9 by Mark Webster. During the rest of the season, the best van Duijvenbode could do was reach the last 32 of three Players Championship events.

=== 2018–2020 ===
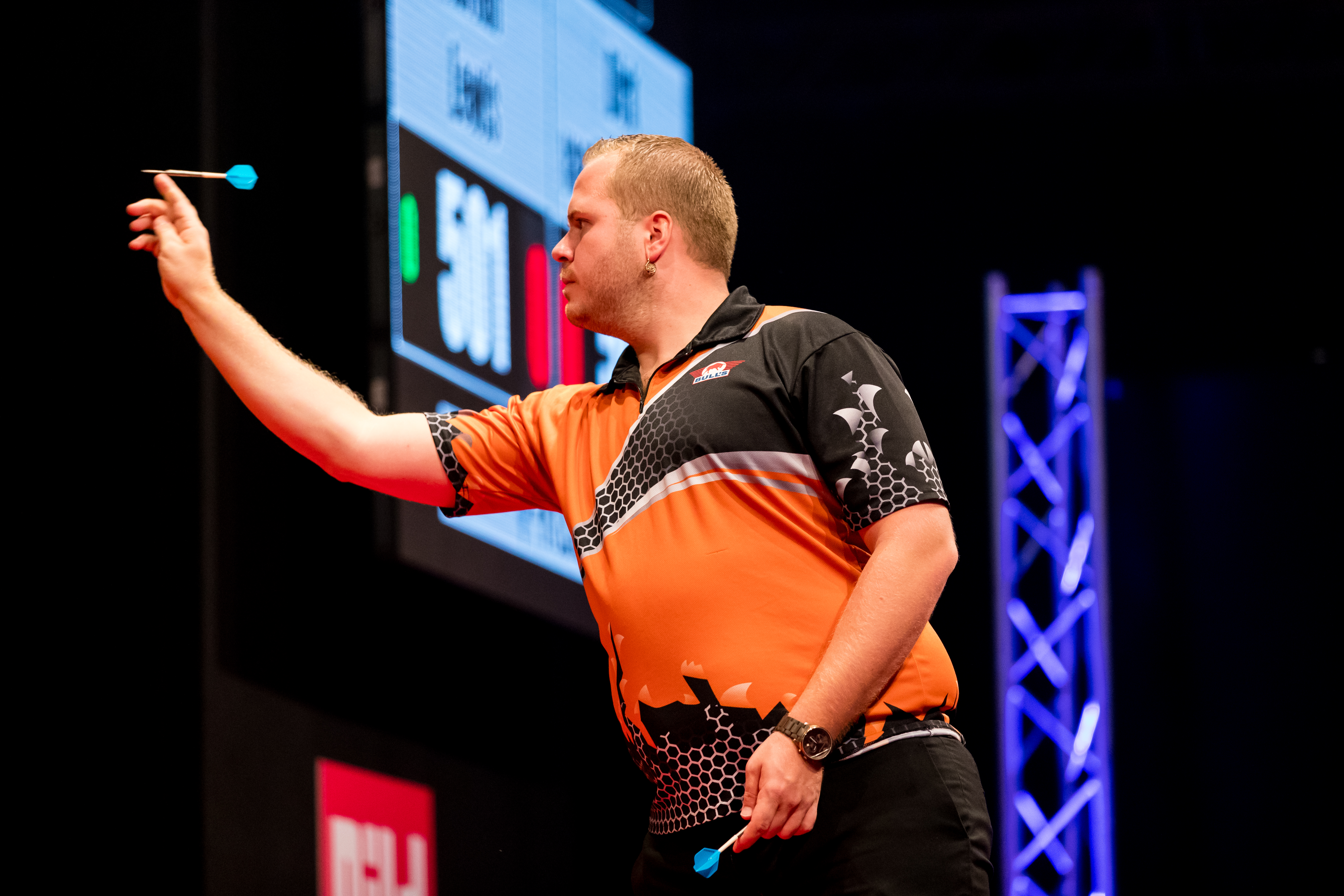
Van Duijenbode at the 2019 European Darts Matchplay

After winning his Tour Card back at the start of 2018 only to lose it after his two-year spell, van Duijvenbode won a Tour Card for the third time at 2020 European Q-School. On 9 February 2020, he made his first ever PDC semi-final, losing to Gerwyn Price 7–4 at Players Championship 2. He also reached the semi-final of the 2020 Belgian Darts Championship. Van Duijvenbode's strong start to the 2020 PDC Pro Tour helped him qualify for the 2020 World Grand Prix, where despite being a debutant and the lowest-ranked qualifier on the Order of Merit, he defeated top 16 players Mensur Suljović, Dimitri Van den Bergh, Gary Anderson & Simon Whitlock to reach his first televised final, where he was defeated by Gerwyn Price. His strong performances on the 2020 PDC Pro Tour were enough to earn him a spot at the World Championship for the first time in 5 years.

=== 2021 ===
At the 2021 World Championship, van Duijvenbode came back from 2 sets behind to beat Bradley Brooks 3–2 in the first round, and then beat the fifth seed Rob Cross in the second. In the third round he whitewashed Adam Hunt 4–0, to set up a tie with Glen Durrant in the last 16. Although he lost the first 2 sets to Durrant, he won the match 4–3 to progress to the quarter-finals, where he was beaten by Gary Anderson 5–1, ending his run. However, this performance was enough to see him reach the world's top 32 for the first time in his career. van Duijvenbode picked up his first PDC ranking title by winning Players Championship 2, beating fellow Dutchman Martijn Kleermaker in the final.

=== 2022 ===
Van Duijvenbode qualified for the 2022 PDC World Darts Championship as the 17th seed, and therefore entered the tournament at the second round stage. He defeated Boris Koltsov in the second round 3–2 in sets. In the third round Dirk played against Ross Smith and came back from 3–0 down to win the match 4–3. He was defeated in the fourth round by Gerwyn Price.

On the 2022 PDC Pro Tour, van Duijvenbode won two Players Championship events. Van Duijvenbode made his second appearance at the World Matchplay and entered the event as the 14th seed based on his then-ranking on the PDC Order of Merit. At the 2022 World Matchplay, he defeated Ryan Searle and world number 3 Michael Smith before losing to his 2022 PDC World Cup teammate Danny Noppert 16–11 in the quarter-final stage. According to the statistical website Darts Orakel, van Duijvenbode usurped José de Sousa as the most prolific 180 hitter on the PDC circuit, averaging one maximum every 0.378 legs of darts in the calendar year up to August 2022.

=== 2023–2024 ===
Van Duijvenbode qualified for the 2023 PDC World Darts Championship as the 14th seed and defeated Karel Sedláček in the second round 3–2 to set up a rematch with Ross Smith, defeating him in the third round of the World Championship 4–3 for the second year running. The match had 31 180s, a record for a best of 7 sets match. Van Duijvenbode lost to Michael van Gerwen 4–1 in the fourth round.

During the 2023 PDC Pro Tour season, Van Duijvenbode reached two PDC European Tour finals. At the 2023 European Darts Open, he survived four match darts in the semi-finals and won the last 5 legs to beat Rob Cross from 6–2 down. At the European Open and the 2023 European Darts Matchplay, he lost both finals 8–7 in deciding legs, to Gerwyn Price and Luke Humphries respectively. Van Duijvenbode won 3 of the first 2023 Players Championship events. As a result of his tournament wins and performances, van Duijvenbode reached a career–high ranking of 2nd on the PDC Pro Tour Order of Merit. After his win at Players Championship 10 Van Duijvenbode closed to within £50,000 of world number ten Dimitri Van den Bergh in the PDC World Rankings and stated that his goal for the year was to reach the top ten.

Van Duijvenbode's form declined following an injury he suffered after falling over during his walk–on before his match against Dylan Slevin at the 2023 Dutch Darts Championship in April. He reached the second round at the 2023 World Matchplay, beating Kim Huybrechts 12–10 in the first round before losing to Luke Humphries 14–12. He reached the top ten in the rankings for the first time and was therefore seeded 10th for the World Grand Prix but he lost in the opening round to Brendan Dolan 2–1 in sets. Van Duijvenbode then suffered exits in his first games at the European Championship, Players Championship Finals, World Championship and the 2024 UK Open. Van Duijvenbode finished third in his group at the 2023 Grand Slam of Darts, losing to Gary Anderson 5–4 in a deciding leg in his opening match followed by a 5–2 win over Steve Lennon and a 5–1 loss to Luke Humphries. He failed to average over 86 in any of his three group matches. As a result of his early exits at tournaments Van Duijvenbode's ranking suffered and he failed to qualify for the 2024 World Matchplay, World Grand Prix and the 2024 Grand Slam of Darts. Van Duijvenbode did reach a quarter-final on the European Tour at the 2024 Flanders Darts Trophy, helping him qualify for the European Championship where he reached the quarter-finals.

At the 2024 PDC Players Championship series Van Duijvenbode reached the final at PC6, losing to Dave Chisnall 8–6 in the final, This qualified Van Duijvenbode for the 2024 Players Championship Finals as the 23rd seed. He defeated 42nd seed Callan Rydz in the first round 6–1. Van Duijvenbode then defeated Florian Hempel, 6–3, and Jermaine Wattimena, 10–5, to reach the quarter-finals. Van Duijvenbode defeated Connor Scutt 10–9 in a deciding leg to reach his first semi-final at the Players Championship Finals.

=== 2025 ===
As the 25th seed, Van Duijvenbode was defeated in his opening match at the 2025 World Championship, losing 3–1 to Madars Razma in the second round. He reached the final of Players Championship 17 in June, where he lost to Chris Dobey in a deciding leg. He was a quarter-finalist at the World Grand Prix, his first time reaching the last eight of the tournament since making the 2020 final. He was eliminated in a 3–0 defeat to Jonny Clayton.

Van Duijvenbode hit a nine-dart finish in the fourth leg of his first-round win over Karel Sedláček at the German Darts Championship. He reached the final of the tournament, where he was beaten 8–6 by Nathan Aspinall. He hit a further three nine-darters in Players Championship events throughout the year.

=== 2026 ===
Following a 3–2 victory over Andy Baetens, 29th seed Van Duijvenbode lost 3–2 to James Hurrell in the second round of the 2026 World Championship. He was a finalist at Players Championship 15, losing 8–5 to Michael van Gerwen. In July, Van Duijvenbode defeated three seeded players—Chris Dobey, Van Gerwen, and Gary Anderson—en route to his first World Matchplay semi-final. He lost 17–5 to eventual champion Luke Littler.

== Personal life ==
Van Duijvenbode has two children. He has been nicknamed "Aubergenius" due to him working on an aubergine farm.

== World Championship results ==
=== PDC ===
- 2016: First round (lost to Raymond van Barneveld 0–3)
- 2021: Quarter-finals (lost to Gary Anderson 1–5)
- 2022: Fourth round (lost to Gerwyn Price 1–4)
- 2023: Fourth round (lost to Michael van Gerwen 1–4)
- 2024: Second round (lost to Boris Krčmar 1–3)
- 2025: Second round (lost to Madars Razma 1–3)
- 2026: Second round (lost to James Hurrell 2–3)

== Career finals ==
=== PDC major finals: 2 ===
Legend
World Grand Prix (0–1)
World Series of Darts Finals (0–1)

| Outcome | No. | Year | Championship | Opponent in the final | Score (Note: (l) = score in legs, (s) = score in sets.) |
|---|---|---|---|---|---|
| Runner-up | 1. | 2020 | World Grand Prix | Gerwyn Price | 2–5 (s) |
| Runner-up | 2. | 2022 | World Series of Darts Finals | Gerwyn Price | 10–11 (l) |

=== PDC world series finals: 1 ===
Legend
World Series of Darts (0–1)

| Outcome | No. | Year | Championship | Opponent in the final | Score |
|---|---|---|---|---|---|
| Runner-up | 1. | 2022 | Dutch Darts Masters | Dimitri Van den Bergh | 2–8 (l) |

== Performance timeline ==
Van Duijvenbode's performance timeline is as follows:

| Tournament | 2011 | 2012 | 2013 | 2014 | 2015 | 2016 | 2017 | 2018 | 2019 | 2020 | 2021 | 2022 | 2023 | 2024 | 2025 | 2026 |
|---|---|---|---|---|---|---|---|---|---|---|---|---|---|---|---|---|
PDC Ranked televised events
| World Championship | Did not qualify | | | | | 1R | Did not qualify | | | | QF | 4R | 4R | 2R | 2R | 2R |
| World Masters (Note: A non-ranked event until 2025) | Did not qualify | | | | | | | | | | | 1R | QF | 2R | Prel. | Prel. |
| UK Open | Did not qualify | | | 3R | 1R | 4R | 4R | 4R | 3R | 5R | 5R | 6R | 5R | 4R | 4R | 4R |
| World Matchplay | Did not qualify | | | | | | | | | | 1R | QF | 2R | DNQ | 2R | SF |
| World Grand Prix | Did not qualify | | | | | | | | | F | 1R | 1R | 1R | DNQ | QF | 1R |
| European Championship | Did not qualify | | | | 1R | Did not qualify | | | | QF | DNQ | SF | 1R | QF | 1R | 1R |
| Grand Slam | Did not qualify | | | | | | | | | RR | DNQ | 2R | RR | DNQ | | |
| Players Championship Finals | Did not qualify | | | | | | | | | QF | 1R | QF | 1R | SF | 1R | |
PDC Non-ranked televised events
| World Cup | Did not participate | | | | | | | | | | QF | SF | 2R | DNQ | | |
| World Series Finals | Not held | | | | Did not qualify | | | | | | 2R | F | 1R | 1R | DNQ | QF |
| World Youth Championship | 2R | 3R | 3R | SF | 1R | 1R | Did not participate | | | | | | | | | |
Career statistics
| Year-end ranking | - | - | - | 86 | 47 | 77 | 72 | 99 | 92 | 43 | 15 | 13 | 13 | 26 | 30 | |

=== PDC European Tour ===
| Season | 1 | 2 | 3 | 4 | 5 | 6 | 7 | 8 | 9 | 10 | 11 | 12 | 13 | 14 | 15 |
|---|---|---|---|---|---|---|---|---|---|---|---|---|---|---|---|
| 2014 | GDC; 2R | DNQ | | ADO; 1R | DNQ | | | EDT; 1R | | | | | | | |
| 2015 | GDC; DNQ | GDT; 1R | DNQ | | | EDO; 2R | EDT; 1R | EDM; 1R | EDG; DNQ | | | | | | |
| 2016 | DDM; 1R | GDM; DNQ | GDT; 1R | Did not qualify | | | | | | | | | | | |
| 2017 | GDC; DNQ | GDM; 1R | GDO; 1R | EDG; 2R | GDT; DNQ | EDM; 2R | ADO; 1R | DNQ | | GDG; 1R | DNQ | | | | |
| 2018 | Did not qualify | | | | | | | | EDM; 1R | DNQ | | IDO; 1R | EDT; DNQ | | |
| 2019 | DNQ | | | | ADO; 1R | Did not qualify | | | | | EDM; 2R | DNQ | | | |
| 2020 | BDC; SF | DNQ | | IDO; WD | | | | | | | | | | | |
| 2021 | HDT; 2R | GDT; 2R | | | | | | | | | | | | | |
| 2022 | IDO; 3R | GDC; 3R | GDG; 3R | ADO; QF | EDO; QF | CDO; 3R | EDG; 2R | DDC; QF | EDM; 2R | HDT; 3R | GDO; 2R | BDO; 3R | GDT; 3R | | |
| 2023 | BSD; QF | EDO; F | IDO; SF | GDG; 3R | ADO; 3R | DDC; 3R | BDO; QF | CDO; 3R | EDG; 2R | EDM; F | GDO; QF | HDT; 2R | GDC; 2R | | |
| 2024 | BDO; 2R | GDG; 2R | IDO; 2R | EDG; 2R | ADO; 2R | BSD; 2R | DDC; 2R | EDO; 3R | GDC; 2R | FDT; QF | HDT; 1R | SDT; 1R | CDO; DNQ | | |
| 2025 | BDO; 3R | EDT; 1R | IDO; 2R | GDG; 2R | ADO; QF | EDG; SF | DDC; 3R | EDO; 1R | BSD; 2R | FDT; 2R | CDO; 2R | HDT; 1R | SDT; 2R | GDC; F | |
| 2026 | PDO; 1R | EDT; QF | BDO; 2R | GDG; 3R | EDG; 1R | ADO; 1R | IDO; 1R | BSD; 2R | SDO; 1R | EDO; QF | HDT; QF | CDO; 1R | FDT; 1R | SDT; QF | DDC; 2R |

==== PDC Players Championships ====
| Season | 1 | 2 | 3 | 4 | 5 | 6 | 7 | 8 | 9 | 10 | 11 | 12 | 13 | 14 | 15 | 16 | 17 | 18 | 19 | 20 | 21 | 22 | 23 | 24 | 25 | 26 | 27 | 28 | 29 | 30 | 31 | 32 | 33 | 34 |
|---|---|---|---|---|---|---|---|---|---|---|---|---|---|---|---|---|---|---|---|---|---|---|---|---|---|---|---|---|---|---|---|---|---|---|
| 2011 (Note: Not a Tour card holder) | Did not participate | | | | | | | | | | | | NUL; 1R | NUL; 1R | Did not participate | | | | NUL; 1R | NUL; 1R | DNP | | | GLA; 2R | GLA; 1R | Did not participate | | | | | | | | |
| 2015 | BAR; 4R | BAR; 1R | BAR; 1R | BAR; 1R | BAR; 1R | COV; 1R | COV; 3R | COV; 4R | CRA; 4R | CRA; 1R | BAR; 2R | BAR; QF | WIG; 2R | WIG; QF | BAR; 1R | BAR; 1R | DUB; 2R | DUB; 2R | COV; 1R | COV; 1R | | | | | | | | | | | | | | |
| 2016 | BAR; 1R | BAR; 3R | BAR; 2R | BAR; 1R | BAR; 1R | BAR; DNP | | COV; 1R | COV; 1R | BAR; 1R | BAR; 2R | BAR; 2R | BAR; 3R | BAR; 2R | BAR; 1R | BAR; 1R | DUB; 3R | DUB; 1R | BAR; 1R | BAR; 2R | | | | | | | | | | | | | | |
| 2017 | BAR; 1R | BAR; 3R | BAR; 2R | BAR; QF | MIL; 2R | MIL; 1R | BAR; 1R | BAR; 1R | WIG; 2R | WIG; 1R | MIL; DNP | | WIG; 1R | WIG; 4R | BAR; 1R | BAR; 1R | BAR; 1R | BAR; 3R | DUB; 1R | DUB; 1R | BAR; 1R | BAR; 2R | | | | | | | | | | | | |
| 2018 | BAR; 1R | BAR; 2R | BAR; 1R | BAR; 1R | MIL; 1R | MIL; 1R | BAR; 1R | BAR; 1R | WIG; 1R | WIG; 1R | MIL; 1R | MIL; 1R | WIG; QF | WIG; 4R | BAR; 1R | BAR; 1R | BAR; 1R | BAR; 2R | DUB; 1R | DUB; 1R | BAR; 1R | BAR; 1R | | | | | | | | | | | | |
| 2019 | WIG; 1R | WIG; 1R | WIG; 1R | WIG; 2R | BAR; 1R | BAR; 3R | WIG; 3R | WIG; 1R | BAR; 1R | BAR; 1R | BAR; 1R | BAR; 3R | BAR; 1R | BAR; 1R | BAR; 2R | BAR; 3R | WIG; 1R | WIG; 1R | BAR; 2R | BAR; 3R | HIL; 2R | HIL; 1R | BAR; 2R | BAR; 2R | BAR; 2R | BAR; 1R | DUB; 2R | DUB; 2R | BAR; 1R | BAR; 3R | | | | |
| 2020 | BAR; 3R | BAR; SF | WIG; 4R | WIG; 1R | WIG; 1R | WIG; 1R | BAR; 1R | BAR; 3R | MIL; 1R | MIL; 3R | MIL; 2R | MIL; 2R | MIL; 4R | NIE; 2R | NIE; 1R | NIE; 3R | NIE; 1R | NIE; 3R | COV; 3R | COV; 4R | COV; 2R | COV; 4R | COV; 4R | | | | | | | | | | | |
| 2021 | BOL; 3R | BOL; 4R | BOL; 3R | BOL; QF | MIL; QF | MIL; QF | MIL; 1R | MIL; 2R | NIE; 1R | NIE; 2R | NIE; W | NIE; F | MIL; QF | MIL; 3R | MIL; 1R | MIL; SF | COV; 3R | COV; 1R | COV; 2R | COV; 1R | BAR; 1R | BAR; 1R | BAR; 1R | BAR; 3R | BAR; SF | BAR; QF | BAR; 4R | BAR; 4R | BAR; 2R | BAR; 4R | | | | |
| 2022 | BAR; 2R | BAR; 1R | WIG; 1R | WIG; 3R | BAR; QF | BAR; 3R | NIE; QF | NIE; 2R | BAR; 1R | BAR; 1R | BAR; 2R | BAR; W | BAR; 2R | WIG; 1R | WIG; QF | NIE; F | NIE; QF | BAR; W | BAR; DNP | | | BAR; 1R | BAR; 4R | BAR; 4R | BAR; 3R | BAR; F | BAR; 4R | BAR; QF | BAR; 1R | BAR; 1R | | | | |
| 2023 | BAR; QF | BAR; 4R | BAR; 1R | BAR; W | BAR; QF | BAR; W | HIL; QF | HIL; 1R | WIG; 4R | WIG; W | LEI; 2R | LEI; 1R | HIL; 2R | HIL; 2R | LEI; 3R | LEI; QF | DNP | | | BAR; 2R | BAR; 4R | BAR; 2R | BAR; 3R | BAR; 4R | Did not participate | | | | | | | | | |
| 2024 | WIG; 1R | WIG; 1R | LEI; 4R | LEI; QF | HIL; 2R | HIL; F | LEI; 2R | LEI; 2R | HIL; 1R | HIL; 1R | HIL; SF | HIL; 1R | MIL; 2R | MIL; 1R | MIL; 1R | MIL; 4R | MIL; 2R | MIL; 1R | MIL; 1R | WIG; 1R | WIG; 3R | MIL; 1R | MIL; 2R | WIG; 3R | WIG; 4R | WIG; 1R | WIG; 1R | WIG; SF | LEI; 4R | LEI; 2R | | | | |
| 2025 | WIG; 3R | WIG; 3R | ROS; 2R | ROS; 1R | LEI; 3R | LEI; 3R | HIL; SF | HIL; 2R | LEI; 4R | LEI; 2R | LEI; 3R | LEI; 3R | ROS; 4R | ROS; QF | HIL; 3R | HIL; QF | LEI; F | LEI; 1R | LEI; 1R | LEI; 3R | LEI; 2R | HIL; DNP | | MIL; QF | MIL; 3R | HIL; 3R | HIL; 1R | LEI; 3R | LEI; 4R | LEI; 2R | WIG; 2R | WIG; 3R | WIG; 1R | WIG; 2R |
| 2026 | HIL; 3R | HIL; 3R | WIG; 3R | WIG; 1R | LEI; 2R | LEI; 3R | LEI; 2R | LEI; 3R | WIG; 1R | WIG; 1R | MIL; 3R | MIL; 1R | HIL; 2R | HIL; 4R | LEI; F | LEI; 3R | LEI; QF | LEI; 1R | MIL; 2R | MIL; 2R | WIG; QF | WIG; 3R | LEI; 1R | LEI; 2R | HIL; 1R | HIL; 1R | LEI; 4R | LEI; 1R | ROS; 2R | ROS; 4R | ROS; SF | ROS; 2R | LEI; QF | LEI; 3R |

==== PDC World Series of Darts ====
| Tournament | 2022 | 2024 | 2025 |
|---|---|---|---|
| Dutch Masters | F | 1R | 1R |

Performance Table Legend
| W | Won the tournament | F | Finalist | SF | Semifinalist | QF | Quarterfinalist | #R; RR; Prel. | Lost in # round Round-robin; Preliminary round | DQ | Disqualified |
| DNQ | Did not qualify | DNP | Did not participate | WD | Withdrew | NH | Tournament not held | #R; RR; Prel. | Lost in # round Round-robin; Preliminary round | NYF | Not yet founded |
