= 2020 World Grand Prix (darts) =

2020 BoyleSports World Grand Prix

Tournament information
- Dates: 6–12 October 2020
- Venue: Coventry Arena
- Location: Coventry, England
- Organisation(s): Professional Darts Corporation (PDC)
- Format: Sets "Double in, Double out"
- Prize fund: £450,000
- Winner's share: £110,000
- High checkout: 164 Gerwyn Price

Champion(s)
- Gerwyn Price (WAL)

The 2020 BoyleSports World Grand Prix was a darts tournament and the 23rd staging of the World Grand Prix. It was held from 6 to 12 October 2020 at the Coventry Arena in Coventry, England, behind closed doors. Due to the COVID-19 pandemic, the tournament was held away from the Citywest Hotel in Dublin for the first time since 2000.

Michael van Gerwen was the defending champion, after defeating Dave Chisnall 5–2 in the 2019 final, to win his second consecutive and fifth overall World Grand Prix title. However, he was eliminated in the quarter-finals, after losing 3–0 to Simon Whitlock of Australia.

Gerwyn Price went on to beat Dirk van Duijvenbode 5–2 in the final to win the tournament for the first time.

This event saw the most seeds knocked out in the first round in the history of the tournament, with 6 of the 8 seeds eliminated, leaving only Van Gerwen and Price to make it into the second round.

By reaching the final, van Duijvenbode became the first person (other than Phil Taylor and Rod Harrington in the inaugural tournament in 1998) to reach the final on his debut in the tournament.

== Prize money ==
The prize fund remained at £450,000, with the winner's earnings being £110,000.

The following is the breakdown of the fund:

Position (num. of players)		Prize money (Total: £450,000)
Winner	(1)	£110,000
Runner-up	(1)	£50,000
Semi-finalists	(2)	£25,000
Quarter-finalists	(4)	£16,000
Second round losers	(8)	£10,000
First round losers	(16)	£6,000

== Qualification ==
The field of 32 players consists of the top 16 on the PDC Order of Merit and the top 16 non-qualified players from the ProTour Order of Merit as of 27 September 2020; the top eight players on the Order of Merit are seeded for the tournament.

Prior to the tournament, Adrian Lewis and Stephen Bunting tested positive for COVID-19 and withdrew. They were replaced by Simon Whitlock and Jeffrey de Zwaan respectively, the next-ranked players on the Orders of Merit that they had qualified from.

The qualified field is as follows:

PDC Order of Merit (1–16) (Top 8 seeded)

1. (Netherlands) Michael van Gerwen (quarter-finals)
2. (Scotland) Peter Wright (first round)
3. (Wales) Gerwyn Price (champion)
4. (England) Michael Smith (first round)
5. (England) Rob Cross (first round)
6. (England) Nathan Aspinall (first round)
7. (Northern Ireland) Daryl Gurney (first round)
8. (England) James Wade (first round)
9. (Scotland) Gary Anderson (quarter-finals)
10. (England) Dave Chisnall (semi-finals)
11. (Belgium) Dimitri Van den Bergh (second round)
12. (England) Ian White (first round)
13. (England) Glen Durrant (first round)
14. (Poland) Krzysztof Ratajski (first round)
15. (Austria) Mensur Suljović (first round)
16. (England) ~~Adrian Lewis (COVID-19)~~
17. (Australia) Simon Whitlock (semi-finals)

Pro Tour

1. (South Africa) Devon Petersen (second round)
2. (Netherlands) Danny Noppert (second round)
3. (Portugal) José de Sousa (first round)
4. (Northern Ireland) Brendan Dolan (first round)
5. (England) Joe Cullen (quarter-finals)
6. (Wales) Jonny Clayton (second round)
7. (England) Ryan Searle (first round)
8. (Netherlands) Jermaine Wattimena (first round)
9. (Germany) Gabriel Clemens (second round)
10. (England) Mervyn King (second round)
11. (England) ~~Stephen Bunting (COVID-19)~~
12. (England) Ryan Joyce (second round)
13. (England) Jamie Hughes (first round)
14. (Netherlands) Dirk van Duijvenbode (runner-up)
15. (England) Chris Dobey (first round)
16. (Belgium) Kim Huybrechts (second round)
17. (Netherlands) Jeffrey de Zwaan (quarter-finals)

== Draw ==
First round (best of 3 sets); 6–7 October
1	(Netherlands) Michael van Gerwen 98.64	2
(Poland) Krzysztof Ratajski 85.08	1
(Portugal) José de Sousa 93.46	0
(South Africa) Devon Petersen 87.83	2
8	(England) James Wade 78.94	0
(England) Mervyn King 86.76	2
Alt	(Australia) Simon Whitlock 101.12	2
(England) Chris Dobey 77.33	0
4	(England) Michael Smith 87.89	0
(Belgium) Dimitri Van den Bergh 96.40	2
(Austria) Mensur Suljović 71.43	1
(Netherlands) Dirk van Duijvenbode 72.98	2
5	(England) Rob Cross 77.46	0
(Scotland) Gary Anderson 89.14	2
(Netherlands) Danny Noppert 89.01	2
(England) Ryan Searle 82.15	1
2	(Scotland) Peter Wright 82.06	0
(England) Ryan Joyce 96.61	2
(England) Dave Chisnall 102.85	2
(England) Glen Durrant 78.26	0
7	(Northern Ireland) Daryl Gurney 82.09	1
(England) Joe Cullen 92.01	2
(Wales) Jonny Clayton 85.16	2
(England) Ian White 88.93	1
3	(Wales) Gerwyn Price 84.02	2
(Netherlands) Jermaine Wattimena 79.10	0
(Northern Ireland) Brendan Dolan 91.32	1
(Belgium) Kim Huybrechts 86.91	2
6	(England) Nathan Aspinall 86.71	0
(Germany) Gabriel Clemens 86.52	2
(England) Jamie Hughes 84.33	1
Alt	(Netherlands) Jeffrey de Zwaan 84.65	2

Second round (best of 5 sets); 8–9 October
1	(Netherlands) Michael van Gerwen 96.28	3
(South Africa) Devon Petersen 91.48	0
(England) Mervyn King 85.27	2
Alt	(Australia) Simon Whitlock 85.24	3
(Belgium) Dimitri Van den Bergh 93.35	1
(Netherlands) Dirk van Duijvenbode 89.82	3
(Scotland) Gary Anderson 92.72	3
(Netherlands) Danny Noppert 82.33	0
(England) Ryan Joyce 88.22	2
(England) Dave Chisnall 91.37	3
(England) Joe Cullen 92.13	3
(Wales) Jonny Clayton 84.32	2
3	(Wales) Gerwyn Price 95.42	3
(Belgium) Kim Huybrechts 85.59	0
(Germany) Gabriel Clemens 78.92	0
Alt	(Netherlands) Jeffrey de Zwaan 92.88	3

Quarter-finals (best of 5 sets); 10 October
1	(Netherlands) Michael van Gerwen 96.84	0
Alt	(Australia) Simon Whitlock 100.29	3
(Netherlands) Dirk van Duijvenbode 94.29	3
(Scotland) Gary Anderson 88.02	1
(England) Dave Chisnall 87.50	3
(England) Joe Cullen 81.65	2
3	(Wales) Gerwyn Price 90.08	3
Alt	(Netherlands) Jeffrey de Zwaan 82.33	1

Semi-finals (best of 7 sets); 11 October
Alt	(Australia) Simon Whitlock 79.48	1
(Netherlands) Dirk van Duijvenbode 88.17	4
(England) Dave Chisnall 94.40	3
3	(Wales) Gerwyn Price 92.38	4

Final (best of 9 sets); 12 October
(Netherlands) Dirk van Duijvenbode 87.07	2
3	(Wales) Gerwyn Price 88.19	5
