= 2021 World Grand Prix (darts) =

2021 BoyleSports World Grand Prix

Tournament information
- Dates: 3–9 October 2021
- Venue: Leicester Arena
- Location: Leicester, England
- Organisation(s): Professional Darts Corporation (PDC)
- Format: Sets "Double in, Double out"
- Prize fund: £450,000
- Winner's share: £110,000
- High checkout: 170; Jonny Clayton (x2); Ryan Searle

Champion(s)
- Jonny Clayton (WAL)

The 2021 BoyleSports World Grand Prix was a darts tournament and the 24th staging of the World Grand Prix. It was held from 3 to 9 October 2021 at the Leicester Arena in Leicester, England. Due to the COVID-19 pandemic, the tournament was held away from the Citywest Hotel in Dublin for the second consecutive year.

Gerwyn Price was the defending champion, after defeating Dirk van Duijvenbode 5–2 in the 2020 final, but lost to Jonny Clayton 5–1 in the first all-Welsh major ranking final in Professional Darts Corporation (PDC) history. It was also Clayton's first PDC ranking major title win, as his previous three wins (the 2020 PDC World Cup of Darts (alongside Price), the 2021 Masters and the 2021 Premier League Darts) were all in non-ranking events.

== Format ==
All matches were played as double in, double out; requiring the players to score 501 points to win a leg, beginning with as well as finishing on either a double or the bullseye. Matches were played to set format, with each set being the best of five legs (first to three).

This is the only "double in" tournament on the PDC circuit, and along with the World Championship the only tournament which uses the set format.

The matches got longer as the tournament progressed:

Round	Best of (sets)	First to (sets)
First	3	2
Second	5	3
Quarter-finals	5	3
Semi-finals	7	4
Final	9	5

== Prize money ==
The prize fund will remain at £450,000, with the winner's earnings being £110,000.

The following is the breakdown of the fund:

Position (num. of players)		Prize money (Total: £450,000)
Winner	(1)	£110,000
Runner-up	(1)	£50,000
Semi-finalists	(2)	£25,000
Quarter-finalists	(4)	£16,000
Second round losers	(8)	£10,000
First round losers	(16)	£6,000

== Qualification ==
The field of 32 players consists of the top 16 on the PDC Order of Merit and the top 16 non-qualified players from the ProTour Order of Merit as of 26 September 2021. Only the top eight players on the Order of Merit are seeded for the tournament.

The following players have qualified for the tournament:

=== PDC Order of Merit ===
1. Gerwyn Price (runner-up)
2. Peter Wright (first round)
3. Michael van Gerwen (first round)
4. James Wade (second round)
5. Dimitri Van den Bergh (first round)
6. Gary Anderson (first round)
7. José de Sousa (second round)
8. Dave Chisnall (quarter-finals)
9. Michael Smith (first round)
10. Nathan Aspinall (first round)
11. Rob Cross (second round)
12. Krzysztof Ratajski (quarter-finals)
13. Joe Cullen (first round)
14. Jonny Clayton (champion)
15. Glen Durrant (first round)
16. Stephen Bunting (semi-finals)

=== PDC ProTour Qualifiers ===
1. Brendan Dolan (first round)
2. Damon Heta (first round)
3. Dirk van Duijvenbode (first round)
4. Luke Humphries (second round)
5. Ryan Searle (quarter-finals)
6. Danny Noppert (semi-finals)
7. Ross Smith (second round)
8. Gabriel Clemens (first round)
9. Mensur Suljović (first round)
10. Vincent van der Voort (second round)
11. Callan Rydz (first round)
12. Martijn Kleermaker (first round)
13. Ian White (quarter-finals)
14. Daryl Gurney (first round)
15. Mervyn King (second round)
16. Darius Labanauskas (second round)

== Schedule ==
Sunday, 3 October

Game #	Round	Player 1	Score	Player 2	Set 1	Set 2	Set 3
01	1	Martijn Kleermaker	0–2	Mervyn King	2–3	1–3	—N/a
02	1	Dirk van Duijvenbode	0–2	Luke Humphries	1–3	2–3	—N/a
03	1	Stephen Bunting	2–0	Daryl Gurney	3–1	3–1	—N/a
04	1	Joe Cullen	0–2	Ross Smith	0–3	1–3	—N/a
05	1	Dave Chisnall	2–1	Mensur Suljović	3–0	2–3	3–1
06	1	James Wade	2–1	Damon Heta	3–2	1–3	3–2
07	1	Gerwyn Price	2–0	Michael Smith	3–1	3–2	—N/a
08	1	Dimitri Van den Bergh	1–2	Ryan Searle	2–3	3–1	2–3

Monday, 4 October

Game #	Round	Player 1	Score	Player 2	Set 1	Set 2	Set 3
09	1	Darius Labanauskas	2–1	Brendan Dolan	3–2	0–3	3–0
10	1	Callan Rydz	0–2	Jonny Clayton	1–3	0–3	—N/a
11	1	Vincent van der Voort	2–0	Gabriel Clemens	3–2	3–2	—N/a
12	1	Nathan Aspinall	1–2	Krzysztof Ratajski	3–2	2–3	1–3
13	1	Gary Anderson	1–2	Ian White	2–3	3–2	2–3
14	1	Peter Wright	0–2	Rob Cross	1–3	2–3	—N/a
15	1	Michael van Gerwen	0–2	Danny Noppert	2–3	2–3	—N/a
16	1	José de Sousa	2–0	Glen Durrant	3–0	3–1	—N/a

Tuesday, 5 October

Game #	Round	Player 1	Score	Player 2	Set 1	Set 2	Set 3	Set 4	Set 5
17	2	Ryan Searle	3–1	Luke Humphries	3–2	3–0	2–3	3–2	—N/a
18	2	James Wade	1–3	Stephen Bunting	0–3	3–2	0–3	1–3	—N/a
19	2	Gerwyn Price	3–1	Mervyn King	1–3	3–1	3–2	3–1	—N/a
20	2	Dave Chisnall	3–2	Ross Smith	0–3	1–3	3–1	3–1	3–1

Wednesday, 6 October

Game #	Round	Player 1	Score	Player 2	Set 1	Set 2	Set 3	Set 4	Set 5
21	2	Ian White	3–2	Darius Labanauskas	0–3	0–3	3–1	3–1	3–2
22	2	Rob Cross	1–3	Krzysztof Ratajski	0–3	3–0	1–3	1–3	—N/a
23	2	Danny Noppert	3–0	Vincent van der Voort	3–2	3–1	3–2	—N/a	
24	2	José de Sousa	1–3	Jonny Clayton	3–2	2–3	0–3	1–3	—N/a

Thursday, 7 October

Game #	Round	Player 1	Score	Player 2	Set 1	Set 2	Set 3	Set 4	Set 5
25	QF	Danny Noppert	3–1	Ian White	3–0	2–3	3–2	3–1	—N/a
26	QF	Krzysztof Ratajski	2–3	Jonny Clayton	1–3	3–2	3–2	0–3	1–3
27	QF	Gerwyn Price	3–0	Dave Chisnall	3–0	3–2	3–1	—N/a	
28	QF	Stephen Bunting	3–1	Ryan Searle	1–3	3–1	3–2	3–2	—N/a

Friday, 8 October

Game #	Round	Player 1	Score	Player 2	Set 1	Set 2	Set 3	Set 4	Set 5	Set 6	Set 7
29	SF	Jonny Clayton	4–1	Danny Noppert	3–1	1–3	3–1	3–2	3–0	—N/a	
30	SF	Gerwyn Price	4–2	Stephen Bunting	1–3	2–3	3–2	3–1	3–2	3–0	—N/a

Saturday, 9 October

Game #	Round	Player 1	Score	Player 2	Set 1	Set 2	Set 3	Set 4	Set 5	Set 6	Set 7	Set 8	Set 9
31	F	Gerwyn Price	1–5	Jonny Clayton	1–3	2–3	2–3	3–2	1–3	1–3	—N/a		

== Draw ==
First round (best of 3 sets); 3–4 October
1	Gerwyn Price 100.82	2
Michael Smith 88.38	0
Martijn Kleermaker 76.45	0
Mervyn King 75.62	2
8	Dave Chisnall 84.37	2
Mensur Suljović 83.76	1
Joe Cullen 73.54	0
Ross Smith 91.45	2
4	James Wade 87.12	2
Damon Heta 89.49	1
Stephen Bunting 99.05	2
Daryl Gurney 77.14	0
5	Dimitri Van den Bergh 94.14	1
Ryan Searle 90.73	2
Dirk van Duijvenbode 80.69	0
Luke Humphries 82.51	2
2	Peter Wright 84.69	0
Rob Cross 85.62	2
Nathan Aspinall 88.72	1
Krzysztof Ratajski 94.26	2
7	José de Sousa 78.07	2
Glen Durrant 58.02	0
Callan Rydz 72.72	0
Jonny Clayton 95.10	2
3	Michael van Gerwen 90.55	0
Danny Noppert 96.72	2
Vincent van der Voort 90.47	2
Gabriel Clemens 84.53	0
6	Gary Anderson 77.73	1
Ian White 78.12	2
Darius Labanauskas 85.85	2
Brendan Dolan 90.03	1

Second round (best of 5 sets); 5–6 October
1	Gerwyn Price 93.19	3
Mervyn King 82.65	1
8	Dave Chisnall 91.79	3
Ross Smith 85.47	2
4	James Wade 85.77	1
Stephen Bunting 86.63	3
Ryan Searle 92.87	3
Luke Humphries 87.55	1
Rob Cross 86.86	1
Krzysztof Ratajski 88.04	3
7	José de Sousa 92.55	1
Jonny Clayton 94.95	3
Danny Noppert 91.24	3
Vincent van der Voort 87.14	0
Ian White 88.29	3
Darius Labanauskas 87.53	2

Quarter-finals (best of 5 sets); 7 October
1	Gerwyn Price 87.58	3
8	Dave Chisnall 87.23	0
Stephen Bunting 87.08	3
Ryan Searle 82.54	1
Krzysztof Ratajski 88.28	2
Jonny Clayton 91.44	3
Danny Noppert 95.57	3
Ian White 91.94	1

Semi-finals (best of 7 sets); 8 October
1	Gerwyn Price 88.99	4
Stephen Bunting 88.18	2
Jonny Clayton 94.82	4
Danny Noppert 89.47	1

Final (best of 9 sets); 9 October
1	Gerwyn Price 92.47	1
Jonny Clayton 94.44	5
