= 2011 World Grand Prix (darts) =

2011 PartyPoker.com World Grand Prix

Tournament information
- Dates: 3–9 October 2011
- Venue: Citywest Hotel
- Location: Dublin, Ireland
- Organisation(s): Professional Darts Corporation (PDC)
- Format: Sets "double in, double out"
- Prize fund: £350,000
- Winner's share: £100,000
- Nine-dart finish: Brendan Dolan
- High checkout: 170; Jamie Caven; Brendan Dolan

Champion(s)
- Phil Taylor (ENG)

The 2011 PartyPoker.com World Grand Prix was the fourteenth staging of the World Grand Prix. It was played from 3 to 9 October 2011 at the Citywest Hotel in Dublin, Ireland.

James Wade was the defending champion, however, he lost in the semi-finals to Brendan Dolan who had the unique achievement of becoming the first player to achieve a televised nine-dart finish during a leg in which the players had to start on a double. However, he lost the final to Phil Taylor, who won the World Grand Prix for the tenth time.

== Prize money ==
The total prize fund was £350,000. This was the same for the third World Grand Prix tournament. The following was the breakdown of the fund:

Position (num. of players)		Prize money (Total: £350,000)
Winner	(1)	£100,000
Runner-Up	(1)	£40,000
Semi-finalists	(2)	£20,000
Quarter-finalists	(4)	£12,500
Second round losers	(8)	£7,000
First round losers	(16)	£4,000
Nine-dart finish	(1)	£5,000

== Qualification ==
The field of 32 players were mostly made up from the top 16 in the PDC Order of Merit on September 19, two weeks after the two Players Championships in Derby. The top 8 from these rankings were also the seeded players. The remaining 16 places went to the top 14 non-qualified players from the Players Championship Order of Merit (which was increased by two,) and then to the top 2 non-qualified residents of the Republic of Ireland and Northern Ireland from the 2011 Players Championship Order of Merit who competed in at least six Players Championship events (reduced by two).

PDC Top 16
1. (England) Phil Taylor (winner)
2. (England) Adrian Lewis (first round)
3. (England) James Wade (semi-finals)
4. (Scotland) Gary Anderson (first round)
5. (Australia) Simon Whitlock (second round)
6. (Netherlands) Raymond van Barneveld (second round)
7. (England) Wes Newton (second round)
8. (Wales) Mark Webster (quarter-finals)
9. (Australia) Paul Nicholson (second round)
10. (England) Terry Jenkins (first round)
11. (England) Andy Hamilton (first round)
12. (England) Mervyn King (first round)
13. (England) Mark Walsh (first round)
14. (England) Colin Lloyd (first round)
15. (England) Wayne Jones (first round)
16. (England) Ronnie Baxter (first round)

PDPA Players Championship qualifiers
1. (Canada) John Part (second round)
2. (Netherlands) Vincent van der Voort (second round)
3. (England) Justin Pipe (first round)
4. (England) Jamie Caven (first round)
5. (England) Andy Smith (quarter-finals)
6. (Scotland) Peter Wright (first round)
7. (England) Dave Chisnall (first round)
8. (England) Kevin Painter (first round)
9. (England) Denis Ovens (second round)
10. (Wales) Richie Burnett (semi-finals)
11. (England) Alan Tabern (second round)
12. (England) Steve Brown (first round)
13. (England) Mark Hylton (quarter-finals)
14. (Scotland) John Henderson (quarter-finals)

Irish qualifiers
1. (Northern Ireland) Brendan Dolan (runner-up)
2. (Republic of Ireland) William O'Connor (first round)

== Draw ==
First round (best of 3 sets); 3–4 October
1	(England) Phil Taylor 102.26	2
(Scotland) Peter Wright 93.05	1
(England) Ronnie Baxter 87.91	0
(Australia) Paul Nicholson 91.72	2
8	(Wales) Mark Webster 90.90	2
(England) Andy Hamilton 79.89	1
(England) Dave Chisnall 88.87	1
(England) Alan Tabern 77.27	2
5	(Australia) Simon Whitlock 84.85	2
(England) Terry Jenkins 85.19	1
(England) Mark Hylton 82.34	2
(England) Mark Walsh 79.03	1
4	(Scotland) Gary Anderson 92.78	1
(Wales) Richie Burnett 84.75	2
(England) Jamie Caven 77.25	0
(England) Denis Ovens 82.42	2
2	(England) Adrian Lewis 86.30	1
(Canada) John Part 81.94	2
(Northern Ireland) Brendan Dolan 90.11	2
(England) Wayne Jones 80.14	0
7	(England) Wes Newton 89.77	2
(England) Colin Lloyd 80.45	1
(England) Justin Pipe 76.34	0
(Scotland) John Henderson 81.44	2
6	(Netherlands) Raymond van Barneveld 87.04	2
(England) Mervyn King 85.59	0
(Republic of Ireland) William O'Connor 86.21	0
(England) Andy Smith 86.21	2
3	(England) James Wade 75.02	2
(England) Steve Brown 76.77	0
(Netherlands) Vincent van der Voort 86.42	2
(England) Kevin Painter 82.82	0

Second round (best of 5 sets); 5–6 October
1	(England) Phil Taylor 92.87	3
(Australia) Paul Nicholson 89.64	0
8	(Wales) Mark Webster 87.50	3
(England) Alan Tabern 76.43	1
5	(Australia) Simon Whitlock 85.71	1
(England) Mark Hylton 85.61	3
(Wales) Richie Burnett 88.38	3
(England) Denis Ovens 81.17	1
(Canada) John Part 84.77	1
(Northern Ireland) Brendan Dolan 87.12	3
7	(England) Wes Newton 80.50	2
(Scotland) John Henderson 77.59	3
6	(Netherlands) Raymond van Barneveld 82.28	1
(England) Andy Smith 84.05	3
3	(England) James Wade 88.62	3
(Netherlands) Vincent van der Voort 89.70	2

Quarter-finals (best of 7 sets); 7 October
1	(England) Phil Taylor 101.08	4
8	(Wales) Mark Webster 88.98	0
(England) Mark Hylton 85.70	1
(Wales) Richie Burnett 85.98	4
(Northern Ireland) Brendan Dolan 90.11	4
(Scotland) John Henderson 83.46	1
(England) Andy Smith 85.78	2
3	(England) James Wade 88.19	4

Semi-finals (best of 9 sets); 8 October
1	(England) Phil Taylor 103.02	5
(Wales) Richie Burnett 88.15	2
(Northern Ireland) Brendan Dolan 87.58	5
3	(England) James Wade 86.73	2

Final (best of 11 sets); 9 October
1	(England) Phil Taylor 90.29	6
(Northern Ireland) Brendan Dolan 84.68	3

== Television coverage and sponsorship ==
The tournament was screened by Sky Sports in high definition.

PartyPoker.com sponsored the event for the first time, taking over from Bodog after just one year.
