= 1998 World Grand Prix (darts) =

Tournament information
- Dates: 14–18 October 1998
- Venue: Casino Rooms
- Location: Rochester, England
- Organisation(s): Professional Darts Corporation (PDC)
- Format: Sets "double in, double out"
- Prize fund: £38,000
- Winner's share: £9,000

Champion(s)
- Phil Taylor (ENG)

The 1998 World Grand Prix was a darts tournament organised by the Professional Darts Corporation (PDC) and held at the Casino Rooms in Rochester, England from 14 to 18 October 1998. It was the first year of the tournament and replaced the World Pairs tournament, which ran from 1995 to 1997.

The tournament was formatted unusually, in that players had to start each leg by hitting a double, in addition to the traditional double to finish. It also featured the "best of three" legs per set format, rather than five, for the first and only time in the tournament's history. The "best of three" format was usually associated with BDO events such as the World Masters.

Phil Taylor took the inaugural title, beating world number one, Rod Harrington in the final.

== Seeds ==
There were four seeds for the event.

1. (England) Rod Harrington
2. (England) Alan Warriner
3. (England) Phil Taylor
4. (England) Peter Manley

== Prize money ==
Position (num. of players)		Prize money (Total: £38,000)
Winner	(1)	£9,000
Runner-Up	(1)	£5,000
Semi-finalists	(2)	£3,000
Quarter-finalists	(4)	£2,000
First round losers	(8)	£1,250

== Results ==
Players in bold denote match winners.

**First round** (best of 21 sets); 14–15 October
1	(England) **Rod Harrington** 83.83	**11**
(England) Mick Manning 74.23	5
(England) **Graeme Stoddart** 83.50	**11**
(Singapore) Paul Lim 79.56	4
4	(England) **Peter Manley** 85.77	**11**
(England) Peter Evison 76.86	5
(England) Keith Deller 76.35	9
(England) **Dennis Priestley** 79.33	**11**
2	(England) Alan Warriner 82.41	7
(England) **Shayne Burgess** 89.76	**11**
(United States) **Gary Mawson** 81.89	**11**
(England) Bob Anderson 84.36	10
3	(England) **Phil Taylor** 97.08	**11**
(United States) Steve Brown 80.12	2
(England) **John Lowe** 83.30	**11**
(Canada) John Part 80.00	5

**Quarter-finals** (best of 21 sets); 16 October
1	(England) **Rod Harrington** 86.46	**11**
(England) Graeme Stoddart 78.29	5
4	(England) **Peter Manley** 85.82	**11**
(England) Dennis Priestley 82.80	8
(England) **Shayne Burgess** 87.89	**11**
(United States) Gary Mawson 81.85	4
3	(England) **Phil Taylor** 92.96	**11**
(England) John Lowe 77.70	4

**Semi-finals** (best of 21 sets); 17 October
1	(England) **Rod Harrington** 87.63	**11**
4	(England) Peter Manley 87.75	8
(England) Shayne Burgess 90.68	2
3	(England) **Phil Taylor** 95.63	**11**

**Final** (best of 25 sets); 18 October
1	(England) Rod Harrington 86.64	8
3	(England) **Phil Taylor** 94.61	**13**
