= 2011 Premier League Darts =

Darts competition

2011 888.com Premier League Darts

Tournament information
- Dates: 10 February–19 May 2011

Champion(s)
- Gary Anderson

The 2011 888.com Premier League Darts was a darts tournament organised by the Professional Darts Corporation; the seventh edition of the tournament.

The tournament began at The O_{2} Arena in London on 10 February and finished at the Wembley Arena on 19 May.

The format was a double round robin tournament with the top four finishers moving on to the play-offs. Each league match was played over 14 legs. If a player won his eighth leg before the 14th leg, no further legs were played after this point. Two points were awarded for a win and one point awarded for a draw.

Gary Anderson won his first major title, defeating world champion Adrian Lewis 10–4 in the final. He is the first player to win the title on his debut appearance (except from the inaugural tournament) and this was the first final to feature neither of the top 2 players from the group stage.

This edition of the Premier League contained the most non-English players ever to compete in the same edition of the tournament at four (Raymond van Barneveld, Gary Anderson, Simon Whitlock and Mark Webster).

Mark Webster recorded the worst ever run of matches from weeks 7–11, winning just 6 legs in 5 matches, in a run that culminated in his failure to win any of his last 10 matches and finish with just 5 points and −49 leg difference, the worst ever record from a Premier League season. This stood until Glen Durrant was eliminated with nine consecutive losses and 0 points in the 2021 edition of the tournament.

== Qualification ==
The PDC's top four players following the Ladbrokes.com World Darts Championship on 4 January qualified by right to compete in Premier League Darts, and were joined by four wild card selections. Two were chosen by the PDC and two wild card qualifiers by broadcasters Sky Sports. The line-up was confirmed on 4 January 2011.

Player	Appearance in Premier League	Consecutive Streak	Previous best performance	Order of Merit Ranking
(England) Phil Taylor	7th	7	Winner (2005, 2006, 2007, 2008, 2010)	1
(England) Adrian Lewis	4th	2	Semi-finals (2008)	2
(England) James Wade	4th	4	Winner (2009)	3
(Scotland) Gary Anderson	1st	1	Debut	4
(Netherlands) Raymond van Barneveld WC	6th	6	Semi-finals (2006, 2007, 2008, 2009)	5
(England) Terry Jenkins WC	5th	5	Runner-up (2007)	6
(Australia) Simon Whitlock WC	2nd	2	Semi-finals (2010)	7
(Wales) Mark Webster WC	1st	1	Debut	13

WC = Wild Card

== Venues ==
Fifteen venues were used for the 2011 Premier League, with the only change being The O_{2} Arena giving London a second venue, replacing Coventry.

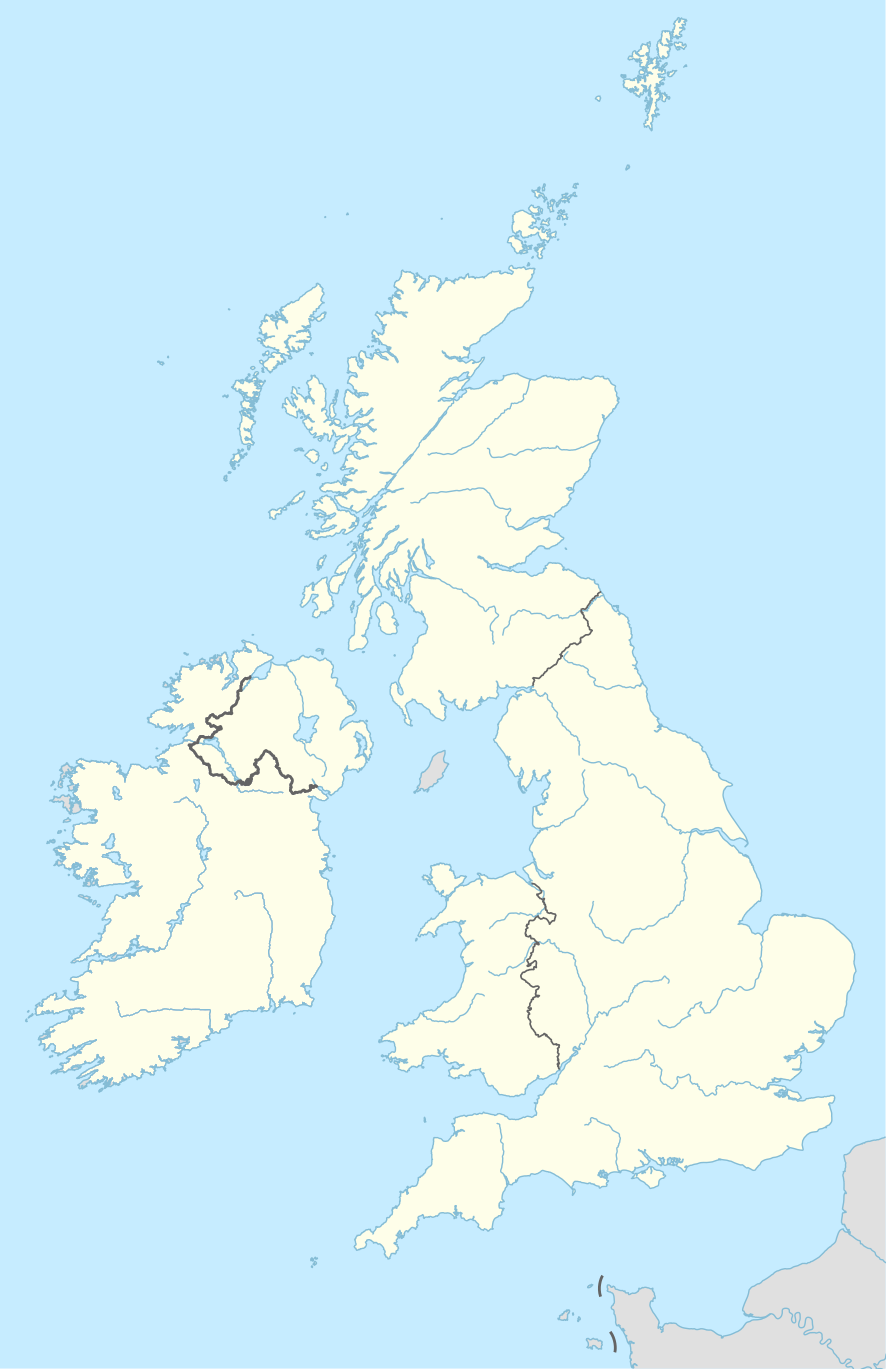
Locations of the 2011 Premier League venues in the United Kingdom.

(England) London	(England) Nottingham	(Northern Ireland) Belfast	(England) Exeter	(England) Manchester
The O_{2} 10 February	Capital FM Arena; 17 February	Odyssey Arena; 24 February	Westpoint Arena; 3 March	MEN Arena; 10 March
(Scotland) Glasgow	(England) Brighton	(Wales) Cardiff	(Scotland) Aberdeen	(England) Sheffield
SECC; 17 March	Brighton Centre; 24 March	Cardiff International Arena; 31 March	AECC; 7 April	Motorpoint Arena; 14 April
(England) Birmingham	(England) Liverpool	(England) Bournemouth	(England) Newcastle upon Tyne	(England) London
National Indoor Arena; 21 April	Echo Arena; 28 April	Bournemouth International Centre; 5 May	Metro Radio Arena; 12 May	Wembley Arena; 19 May

== Prize money ==
The prize fund remained at £410,000 for the 2011 tournament.

Stage	Prize money
Winner	£125,000
Runner-up	£65,000
3rd place	£50,000
4th place	£40,000
5th place	£32,500
6th place	£30,000
7th place	£27,500
8th place	£25,000
High Checkout (per night)	£1,000
Total	£410,000

== Results ==
=== League stage ===
On 4 January 2011, the PDC announced via their official website that Phil Taylor would play against Adrian Lewis on the opening event of the League on 10 February. Lewis subsequently defeated Taylor 8–2 on the opening night. Coincidentally, this turned out to be Taylor's only loss of the league phase, as he went on to win 13 consecutive games. On 12 January the PDC's website released the fixtures.

==== 10 February – Week 1 ====
(England) The O_{2} Arena, London

Player	Legs	Player
Mark Webster (Wales); 100.49	8 – 3	(England) James Wade; 86.79
Gary Anderson (Scotland); 97.02	8 – 5	(Australia) Simon Whitlock; 99.09
Raymond van Barneveld (Netherlands); 89.73	6 – 8	(England) Terry Jenkins; 90.65
Adrian Lewis (England); 100.79	8 – 2	(England) Phil Taylor; 90.54
High Checkout: Gary Anderson 120

==== 17 February – Week 2 ====
(England) Capital FM Arena, Nottingham

Player	Legs	Player
Simon Whitlock (Australia); 91.30	3 – 8	(Netherlands) Raymond van Barneveld; 100.15
James Wade (England); 97.69	8 – 6	(England) Adrian Lewis; 99.09
Phil Taylor (England); 103.87	8 – 5	(Wales) Mark Webster; 97.27
Terry Jenkins (England); 91.41	4 – 8	(Scotland) Gary Anderson; 102.21
High Checkout: Mark Webster 170

==== 24 February – Week 3 ====
(Northern Ireland) Odyssey Arena, Belfast

Player	Legs	Player
Gary Anderson (Scotland); 99.24	8 – 1	(Wales) Mark Webster; 84.81
Simon Whitlock (Australia); 91.71	8 – 5	(England) James Wade; 89.43
Adrian Lewis (England); 96.72	6 – 8	(Netherlands) Raymond van Barneveld; 94.29
Phil Taylor (England); 98.46	8 – 2	(England) Terry Jenkins; 85.61
High Checkout: Adrian Lewis 170

==== 3 March – Week 4 ====
(England) Westpoint Arena, Exeter

Player	Legs	Player
Terry Jenkins (England); 92.39	1 – 8	(Australia) Simon Whitlock; 99.29
Mark Webster (Wales); 110.19	8 – 2	(England) Adrian Lewis; 103.27
Gary Anderson (Scotland); 96.31	8 – 3	(England) James Wade; 90.87
Raymond van Barneveld (Netherlands); 92.32	3 – 8	(England) Phil Taylor; 95.64
High Checkout: Phil Taylor 147

==== 10 March – Week 5 ====
(England) MEN Arena, Manchester

Player	Legs	Player
Terry Jenkins (England); 98.18	8 – 4	(Wales) Mark Webster; 90.91
Phil Taylor (England); 103.95	8 – 6	(Scotland) Gary Anderson; 99.16
James Wade (England); 90.95	2 – 8	(Netherlands) Raymond van Barneveld; 96.49
Simon Whitlock (Australia); 97.16	2 – 8	(England) Adrian Lewis; 101.83
High Checkout: James Wade & Adrian Lewis 136

==== 17 March – Week 6 ====
(Scotland) SECC, Glasgow

Player	Legs	Player
Terry Jenkins (England); 94.16	6 – 8	(England) James Wade; 85.86
Raymond van Barneveld (Netherlands); 100.98	8 – 4	(Wales) Mark Webster; 96.40
Simon Whitlock (Australia); 96.35	5 – 8	(England) Phil Taylor; 103.33
Gary Anderson (Scotland); 87.28	3 – 8	(England) Adrian Lewis; 88.18
High Checkout: Raymond van Barneveld 161

==== 24 March – Week 7 ====
(England) Brighton Centre, Brighton

Player	Legs	Player
Mark Webster (Wales); 87.29	2 – 8	(Australia) Simon Whitlock; 98.44
Adrian Lewis (England); 93.88	7 – 7	(England) Terry Jenkins; 92.69
Raymond van Barneveld (Netherlands); 99.81	8 – 5	(Scotland) Gary Anderson; 92.26
Phil Taylor (England); 105.70	8 – 1	(England) James Wade; 94.00
High Checkout: Simon Whitlock 140

==== 31 March – Week 8 ====
(Wales) Cardiff International Arena, Cardiff

Player	Legs	Player
James Wade (England); 92.09	6 – 8	(Scotland) Gary Anderson; 101.53
Simon Whitlock (Australia); 97.19	8 – 3	(England) Terry Jenkins; 95.08
Phil Taylor (England); 104.52	8 – 3	(Netherlands) Raymond van Barneveld; 96.20
Adrian Lewis (England); 101.30	8 – 1	(Wales) Mark Webster; 87.16
High Checkout: James Wade 141

==== 7 April – Week 9 ====
(Scotland) AECC, Aberdeen

Player	Legs	Player
Gary Anderson (Scotland); 101.25	8 – 3	(England) Terry Jenkins; 86.34
Adrian Lewis (England); 93.11	3 – 8	(England) James Wade; 92.17
Mark Webster (Wales); 92.34	1 – 8	(England) Phil Taylor; 107.07
Raymond van Barneveld (Netherlands); 104.54	5 – 8	(Australia) Simon Whitlock; 107.93
High Checkout: Terry Jenkins 111

==== 14 April – Week 10 ====
(England) Motorpoint Arena, Sheffield

Player	Legs	Player
James Wade (England); 88.49	8 – 5	(Australia) Simon Whitlock; 90.89
Mark Webster (Wales); 83.61	1 – 8	(Scotland) Gary Anderson; 94.42
Terry Jenkins (England); 94.92	2 – 8	(England) Phil Taylor; 106.40
Raymond van Barneveld (Netherlands); 86.04	8 – 3	(England) Adrian Lewis; 84.72
High Checkout: Simon Whitlock 170

==== 21 April – Week 11 ====
(England) National Indoor Arena, Birmingham

Player	Legs	Player
James Wade (England); 106.26	8 – 1	(Wales) Mark Webster; 92.17
Terry Jenkins (England); 99.51	7 – 7	(Netherlands) Raymond van Barneveld; 101.40
Simon Whitlock (Australia); 98.35	6 – 8	(Scotland) Gary Anderson; 103.51
Phil Taylor (England); 107.46	8 – 3	(England) Adrian Lewis; 100.89
High Checkout: James Wade 170

==== 28 April – Week 12 ====
(England) Echo Arena, Liverpool

Player	Legs	Player
Mark Webster (Wales); 84.40	4 – 8	(England) Terry Jenkins; 92.56
Gary Anderson (Scotland); 96.54	3 – 8	(England) Phil Taylor; 101.10
Raymond van Barneveld (Netherlands); 92.63	7 – 7	(England) James Wade; 102.66
Adrian Lewis (England); 95.87	8 – 5	(Australia) Simon Whitlock; 94.95
High Checkout: James Wade 138

==== 5 May – Week 13 ====
(England) Bournemouth International Centre, Bournemouth

Player	Legs	Player
Simon Whitlock (Australia); 94.97	7 – 7	(Wales) Mark Webster; 93.87
Gary Anderson (Scotland); 92.68	4 – 8	(Netherlands) Raymond van Barneveld; 93.49
Terry Jenkins (England); 91.95	3 – 8	(England) Adrian Lewis; 94.59
James Wade (England); 102.84	4 – 8	(England) Phil Taylor; 109.36
High Checkout: Phil Taylor 157

==== 12 May – Week 14 ====
(England) Metro Radio Arena, Newcastle upon Tyne

Player	Legs	Player
James Wade (England); 93.47	8 – 4	(England) Terry Jenkins; 89.16
Mark Webster (Wales); 89.69	4 – 8	(Netherlands) Raymond van Barneveld; 90.10
Adrian Lewis (England); 91.88	7 – 7	(Scotland) Gary Anderson; 99.32
Phil Taylor (England); 101.02	8 – 3	(Australia) Simon Whitlock; 97.88
High Checkout: James Wade 170

=== Play-offs – 19 May ===
(England) Wembley Arena, London

	Score	
Semi-finals (best of 15 legs)
Phil Taylor (England); 99.58	3 – 8	(England) Adrian Lewis; 104.63
Raymond van Barneveld (Netherlands); 96.18	6 – 8	(Scotland) Gary Anderson; 98.49
3rd place play-off (best of 15 legs)
Phil Taylor (England); 91.77	8 – 6	(Netherlands) Raymond van Barneveld; 91.70
Final (best of 19 legs)
Adrian Lewis (England); 85.75	4 – 10	(Scotland) Gary Anderson; 94.67
High Checkout: Raymond van Barneveld 137

== Table and Streaks ==
=== Table ===
Final table statistics:

Pos	Name	Pld	W	D	L	Pts	LF	LA	+/-	LWAT	100+	140+	180s	A	HC
1	(England) Phil Taylor	14	13	0	1	26	106	49	+57	41	207	109	55	102.67	157
2	(Netherlands) Raymond van Barneveld	14	8	2	4	18	95	77	+18	31	243	139	33	93.47	161
3	(Scotland) Gary Anderson W	14	8	1	5	17	92	76	+16	30	197	111	68	97.40	136
4	(England) Adrian Lewis RU	14	6	2	6	14	85	78	+7	28	205	121	40	95.62	170
5	(England) James Wade	14	6	1	7	13	79	88	−9	29	248	98	39	93.47	170
6	(Australia) Simon Whitlock	14	5	1	8	11	81	87	−6	31	180	138	56	96.78	170
7	(England) Terry Jenkins	14	3	2	9	8	66	100	−34	22	230	106	40	92.61	120
8	(Wales) Mark Webster	14	2	1	11	5	51	100	−49	18	188	82	30	91.75	170

Top four qualified for the Play-offs after Week 14.
NB: LWAT = Legs Won Against Throw. Players separated by +/- leg difference if tied.

=== Streaks ===
Player	Week														Play-offs	
Player	1	2	3	4	5	6	7	8	9	10	11	12	13	14	SF	F
(England) Phil Taylor	L	W	W	W	W	W	W	W	W	W	W	W	W	W	L	—N/a
(Netherlands) Raymond van Barneveld	L	W	W	L	W	W	W	L	L	W	D	D	W	W	L	—N/a
(Scotland) Gary Anderson	W	W	W	W	L	L	L	W	W	W	W	L	L	D	W	W
(England) Adrian Lewis	W	L	L	L	W	W	D	W	L	L	L	W	W	D	W	L
(England) James Wade	L	W	L	L	L	W	L	L	W	W	W	D	L	W	—N/a	
(Australia) Simon Whitlock	L	L	W	W	L	L	W	W	W	L	L	L	D	L	—N/a	
(England) Terry Jenkins	W	L	L	L	W	L	D	L	L	L	D	W	L	L	—N/a	
(Wales) Mark Webster	W	L	L	W	L	L	L	L	L	L	L	L	D	L	—N/a	

NB: W = Won D = Drawn L = Lost N/A = Did not play

== Player statistics ==
The following statistics are for the league stage only. Playoffs are not included.

=== Phil Taylor ===
- Longest unbeaten run: 13
- Most consecutive wins: 13
- Most consecutive draws: 0
- Most consecutive losses: 1
- Longest without a win: 1
- Biggest victory: 8–1 (v. James Wade and v. Mark Webster)
- Biggest defeat: 2–8 (v. Adrian Lewis)

=== Raymond van Barneveld ===
- Longest unbeaten run: 5
- Most consecutive wins: 3
- Most consecutive draws: 2
- Most consecutive losses: 2
- Longest without a win: 2
- Biggest victory: 8–2 (v. James Wade)
- Biggest defeat: 3–8 (v. Phil Taylor (twice))

=== Gary Anderson ===
- Longest unbeaten run: 4
- Most consecutive wins: 4
- Most consecutive draws: 1
- Most consecutive losses: 3
- Longest without a win: 3
- Biggest victory: 8–1 (v. Mark Webster (twice))
- Biggest defeat: 3–8 (v. Adrian Lewis and v. Phil Taylor)

=== Adrian Lewis ===
- Longest unbeaten run: 4
- Most consecutive wins: 2
- Most consecutive draws: 1
- Most consecutive losses: 3
- Longest without a win: 3
- Biggest victory: 8–1 (v. Mark Webster)
- Biggest defeat: 2–8 (v. Mark Webster)

=== James Wade ===
- Longest unbeaten run: 4
- Most consecutive wins: 3
- Most consecutive draws: 1
- Most consecutive losses: 3
- Longest without a win: 3
- Biggest victory: 8–1 (v. Mark Webster)
- Biggest defeat: 1–8 (v. Phil Taylor)

=== Simon Whitlock ===
- Longest unbeaten run: 3
- Most consecutive wins: 3
- Most consecutive draws: 1
- Most consecutive losses: 3
- Longest without a win: 5
- Biggest victory: 8–1 (v. Terry Jenkins)
- Biggest defeat: 2–8 (v. Adrian Lewis)

=== Terry Jenkins ===
- Longest unbeaten run: 2
- Most consecutive wins: 1
- Most consecutive draws: 1
- Most consecutive losses: 3
- Longest without a win: 6
- Biggest victory: 8–4 (v. Mark Webster (twice))
- Biggest defeat: 1–8 (v. Simon Whitlock)

=== Mark Webster ===
- Longest unbeaten run: 1
- Most consecutive wins: 1
- Most consecutive draws: 1
- Most consecutive losses: 8
- Longest without a win: 10
- Biggest victory: 8–2 (v. Adrian Lewis)
- Biggest defeat: 1–8 (v. Gary Anderson (twice), v. Adrian Lewis, v. Phil Taylor and v. James Wade)
