= 2010 Premier League Darts =

Darts competition

2010 Whyte & Mackay Premier League Darts

Tournament information
- Dates: 11 February–24 May 2010
- Nine-dart finish: Raymond van Barneveld; Phil Taylor (x2)

Champion(s)
- Phil Taylor

The 2010 Whyte & Mackay Premier League was a darts tournament organised by the Professional Darts Corporation; the sixth such running of the tournament.

The tournament began at The O2 Arena in London on 11 February, and finished at the Wembley Arena on 24 May.

Phil Taylor won in the final 10–8 against defending champion James Wade, where he also became the first player to hit two nine-dart finishes in a single match.

== Qualification ==
The top six players from the PDC Order of Merit following the 2010 PDC World Darts Championship were confirmed on 5 January. Simon Whitlock and Adrian Lewis were named as the two Sky Sports wild card selections; Whitlock being announced on 4 January and Lewis on 13 January.

| Player | Appearance in Premier League | Consecutive Streak | Previous best performance | Order of Merit Ranking |
|---|---|---|---|---|
| (England) Phil Taylor | 6th | 6 | Winner (2005, 2006, 2007, 2008) | 1 |
| (Netherlands) Raymond van Barneveld | 5th | 5 | Semi-Finals (2006, 2007, 2008, 2009) | 2 |
| (England) James Wade | 3rd | 3 | Winner (2009) | 3 |
| (England) Terry Jenkins | 4th | 4 | Runner-up (2007) | 4 |
| (England) Mervyn King | 2nd | 2 | Runner-up (2009) | 5 |
| (England) Ronnie Baxter | 2nd | 1 (Last: 2006) | 5th place (2006) | 6 |
| (Australia) Simon Whitlock WC | 1st | 1 | Debut | 17 |
| (England) Adrian Lewis WC | 3rd | 1 (Last: 2008) | Semi-finals (2008) | 7 |

WC = Wild Card

== Venues ==
Fifteen venues were used for the 2010 Premier League, with the only change from 2009 being Bournemouth replacing Edinburgh after a one-year absence.

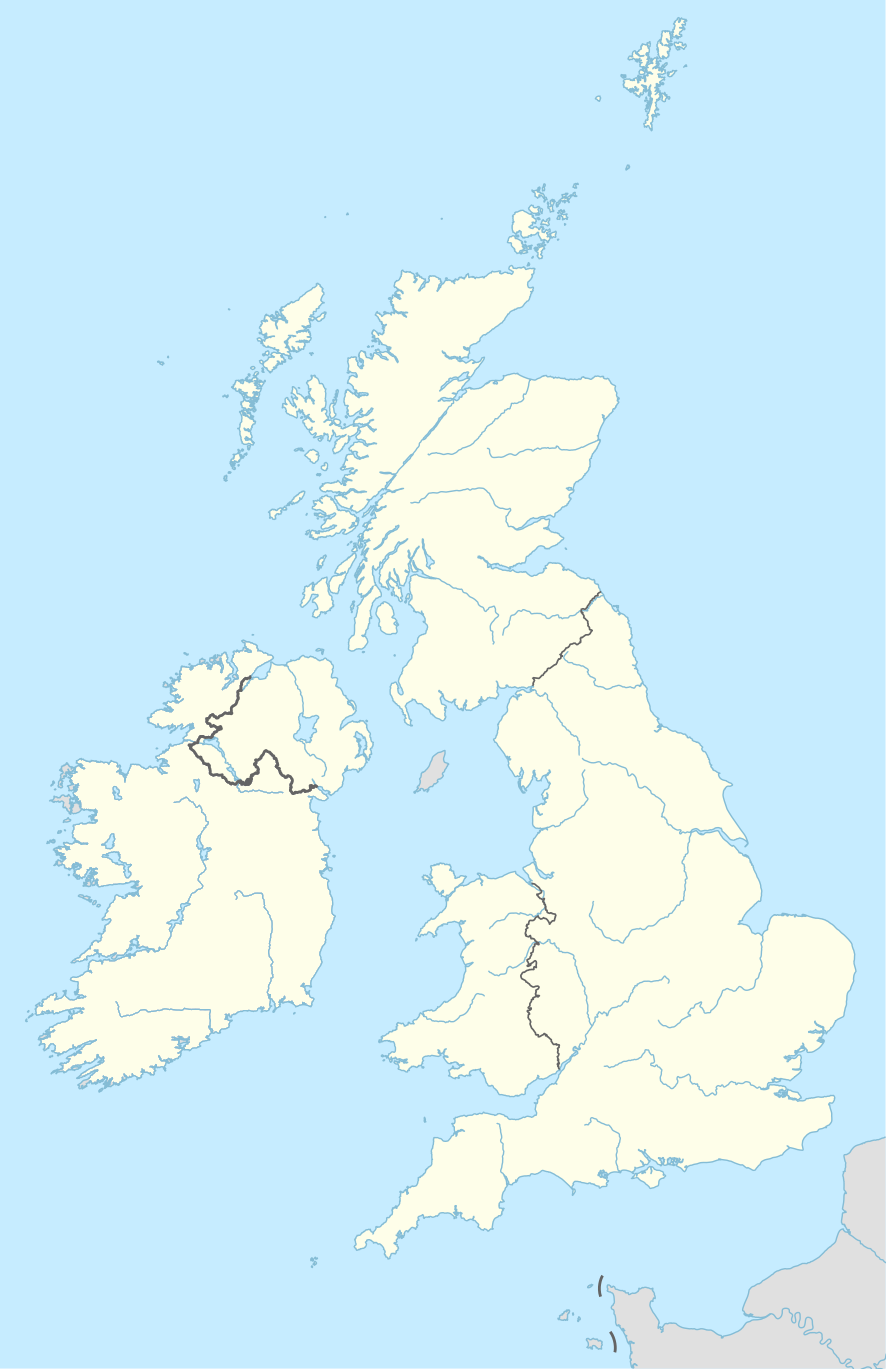
Locations of the 2010 Premier League venues in the United Kingdom.

| (England) London | (England) Bournemouth | (Northern Ireland) Belfast | (England) Exeter | (England) Manchester |
|---|---|---|---|---|
| The O_{2} Arena; 11 February | Bournemouth International Centre; 18 February | Odyssey Arena; 25 February | Westpoint Arena; 4 March | MEN Arena; 11 March |
| (England) Brighton | (England) Birmingham | (Wales) Cardiff | (Scotland) Glasgow | (England) Sheffield |
| Brighton Centre; 18 March | National Indoor Arena; 25 March | Cardiff International Arena; 1 April | SECC; 8 April | Sheffield Arena; 15 April |
| (England) Liverpool | (Scotland) Aberdeen | (England) Newcastle upon Tyne | (England) Nottingham | (England) London |
| Echo Arena; 22 April | AECC; 29 April | Metro Radio Arena; 6 May | Trent FM Arena; 13 May | Wembley Arena; 24 May |

== Prize money ==
The prize money increased again with the total prize fund rising to £410,000, as a third place play-off was introduced, earning the winner of that an extra £10,000 to their £40,000 for reaching the play-offs.

| Stage | Prize money |
|---|---|
| Winner | £125,000 |
| Runner-up | £65,000 |
| 3rd place | £50,000 |
| 4th place | £40,000 |
| 5th place | £32,500 |
| 6th place | £30,000 |
| 7th place | £27,500 |
| 8th place | £25,000 |
| High Checkout (per night) | £1,000 |
| Total | £410,000 |

== Results ==
=== League stage ===
==== 11 February – week 1 ====
(England) The O_{2} Arena, London

| Player | Legs | Player |
|---|---|---|
| Ronnie Baxter (England); 93.80 | 7–7 | (England) Terry Jenkins; 91.31 |
| Mervyn King (England); 101.39 | 8 – 5 | (England) Adrian Lewis; 96.20 |
| Raymond van Barneveld (Netherlands); 92.28 | 8 – 5 | (England) James Wade; 90.44 |
| Simon Whitlock (Australia); 84.20 | 3 – 8 | (England) Phil Taylor; 94.29 |
High Checkout: Mervyn King 124

==== 18 February – week 2 ====
(England) Bournemouth International Centre, Bournemouth

| Player | Legs | Player |
|---|---|---|
| Adrian Lewis (England); 105.14 | 8 – 3 | (Netherlands) Raymond van Barneveld; 99.35 |
| Terry Jenkins (England); 100.26 | 7–7 | (Australia) Simon Whitlock; 96.37 |
| Phil Taylor (England); 99.67 | 8 – 6 | (England) Ronnie Baxter; 96.01 |
| James Wade (England); 89.83 | 4 – 8 | (England) Mervyn King; 91.26 |
High Checkout: Adrian Lewis 121

==== 25 February – week 3 ====
(Northern Ireland) Odyssey Arena, Belfast

| Player | Legs | Player |
|---|---|---|
| Mervyn King (England); 97.89 | 6 – 8 | (England) Ronnie Baxter; 97.11 |
| Adrian Lewis (England); 95.90 | 6 – 8 | (England) Terry Jenkins; 92.11 |
| Simon Whitlock (Australia); 95.56 | 8 – 5 | (Netherlands) Raymond van Barneveld; 92.32 |
| Phil Taylor (England); 104.44 | 8 – 2 | (England) James Wade; 96.96 |
High Checkout: Ronnie Baxter 164

==== 4 March – Week 4 ====
(England) Westpoint Arena, Exeter

| Player | Legs | Player |
|---|---|---|
| James Wade (England); 98.41 | 7–7 | (England) Adrian Lewis; 102.98 |
| Ronnie Baxter (England); 97.51 | 8 – 6 | (Australia) Simon Whitlock; 92.34 |
| Mervyn King (England); 98.74 | 8 – 5 | (England) Terry Jenkins; 94.61 |
| Phil Taylor (England); 97.87 | 8 – 2 | (Netherlands) Raymond van Barneveld; 89.85 |
High Checkout: James Wade 148

==== 11 March – Week 5 ====
(England) MEN Arena, Manchester

| Player | Legs | Player |
|---|---|---|
| James Wade (England); 101.42 | 7–7 | (England) Ronnie Baxter; 103.86 |
| Phil Taylor (England); 100.98 | 7–7 | (England) Mervyn King; 99.45 |
| Terry Jenkins (England); 98.00 | 4 – 8 | (Netherlands) Raymond van Barneveld; 106.92 |
| Adrian Lewis (England); 83.64 | 4 – 8 | (Australia) Simon Whitlock; 82.89 |
High Checkout: Phil Taylor 161

==== 18 March – Week 6 ====
(England) Brighton Centre, Brighton

| Player | Legs | Player |
|---|---|---|
| Phil Taylor (England); 106.79 | 8 – 3 | (England) Terry Jenkins; 98.40 |
| Raymond van Barneveld (Netherlands); 93.87 | 7–7 | (England) Mervyn King; 92.99 |
| Ronnie Baxter (England); 102.52 | 6 – 8 | (England) Adrian Lewis; 101.02 |
| Simon Whitlock (Australia); 91.13 | 4 – 8 | (England) James Wade; 97.73 |
High Checkout: Simon Whitlock 170

==== 25 March – Week 7 ====
(England) National Indoor Arena, Birmingham

| Player | Legs | Player |
|---|---|---|
| Mervyn King (England); 97.70 | 6 – 8 | (Australia) Simon Whitlock; 102.18 |
| James Wade (England); 95.73 | 8 – 5 | (England) Terry Jenkins; 89.47 |
| Raymond van Barneveld (Netherlands); 96.09 | 4 – 8 | (England) Ronnie Baxter; 94.89 |
| Adrian Lewis (England); 97.89 | 4 – 8 | (England) Phil Taylor; 105.25 |
High Checkout: Ronnie Baxter 164

==== 1 April – Week 8 ====
(Wales) Cardiff International Arena, Cardiff

| Player | Legs | Player |
|---|---|---|
| Terry Jenkins (England); 90.24 | 2 – 8 | (England) Mervyn King; 95.08 |
| Simon Whitlock (Australia); 91.43 | 5 – 8 | (England) Ronnie Baxter; 94.10 |
| Adrian Lewis (England); 99.62 | 8 – 5 | (England) James Wade; 95.66 |
| Phil Taylor (England); 97.64 | 8 – 2 | (Netherlands) Raymond van Barneveld; 90.73 |
High Checkout: Ronnie Baxter 124

==== 8 April – Week 9 ====
(Scotland) SECC, Glasgow

| Player | Legs | Player |
|---|---|---|
| Raymond van Barneveld (Netherlands); 94.67 | 6 – 8 | (England) Adrian Lewis; 101.64 |
| Simon Whitlock (Australia); 95.77 | 8 – 3 | (England) Terry Jenkins; 88.80 |
| Ronnie Baxter (England); 87.13 | 4 – 8 | (England) Phil Taylor; 94.14 |
| Mervyn King (England); 94.96 | 4 – 8 | (England) James Wade; 99.64 |
High Checkout: Mervyn King 161

==== 15 April – week 10 ====
(England) Sheffield Arena, Sheffield

| Player | Legs | Player |
|---|---|---|
| Terry Jenkins (England); 93.33 | 8 – 5 | (England) Adrian Lewis; 91.88 |
| Ronnie Baxter (England); 95.36 | 7–7 | (England) Mervyn King; 94.15 |
| James Wade (England); 100.51 | 7–7 | (England) Phil Taylor; 98.92 |
| Raymond van Barneveld (Netherlands); 99.85 | 6 – 8 | (Australia) Simon Whitlock; 99.52 |
High Checkout: Simon Whitlock 154

==== 22 April – week 11 ====
(England) Echo Arena, Liverpool

| Player | Legs | Player |
|---|---|---|
| Terry Jenkins (England); 98.03 | 8 – 4 | (England) Ronnie Baxter; 95.23 |
| James Wade (England); 100.28 | 8 – 3 | (Netherlands) Raymond van Barneveld; 95.96 |
| Adrian Lewis (England); 89.04 | 3 – 8 | (England) Mervyn King; 93.71 |
| Phil Taylor (England); 103.62 | 8 – 5 | (Australia) Simon Whitlock; 102.33 |
High Checkout: Phil Taylor 125

==== 29 April – week 12 ====
(Scotland) AECC, Aberdeen

| Player | Legs | Player |
|---|---|---|
| Ronnie Baxter (England); 87.79 | 7–7 | (England) James Wade; 93.08 |
| Mervyn King (England); 89.98 | 1 – 8 | (England) Phil Taylor; 100.44 |
| Raymond van Barneveld (Netherlands); 98.43 | 8 – 6 | (England) Terry Jenkins; 92.79 |
| Simon Whitlock (Australia); 97.65 | 7–7 | (England) Adrian Lewis; 99.54 |
High Checkout: Terry Jenkins 146

===== Nine-dart finish =====
The Premier League's second nine-dart finish occurred, when Raymond van Barneveld hit one during the second leg of his match against Terry Jenkins, checking out with T20, T19 and D12. Barneveld had also hit the first Premier League nine-dart finish in 2006 against Peter Manley.

==== 6 May – week 13 ====
(England) Metro Radio Arena, Newcastle upon Tyne

| Player | Legs | Player |
|---|---|---|
| Adrian Lewis (England); 86.71 | 7–7 | (England) Ronnie Baxter; 88.84 |
| Mervyn King (England); 81.27 | 5 – 8 | (Netherlands) Raymond van Barneveld; 97.43 |
| James Wade (England); 98.07 | 4 – 8 | (Australia) Simon Whitlock; 97.84 |
| Terry Jenkins (England); 88.91 | 5 – 8 | (England) Phil Taylor; 100.23 |
High Checkout: Mervyn King 130

==== 13 May – week 14 ====
(England) Trent FM Arena, Nottingham

| Player | Legs | Player |
|---|---|---|
| Terry Jenkins (England); 97.78 | 5 – 8 | (England) James Wade; 95.79 |
| Ronnie Baxter (England); 97.97 | 2 – 8 | (Netherlands) Raymond van Barneveld; 95.05 |
| Simon Whitlock (Australia); 104.60 | 8 – 2 | (England) Mervyn King; 90.26 |
| Phil Taylor (England); 98.70 | 8 – 1 | (England) Adrian Lewis; 93.61 |
High Checkout: Simon Whitlock 130

=== Play-offs – 24 May ===
(England) Wembley Arena, London

| | Score | |
|---|---|---|
Semi-finals (best of 15 legs)
| Simon Whitlock (Australia); 92.69 | 6 – 8 | (England) James Wade; 95.48 |
| Phil Taylor (England); 107.98 | 8 – 1 | (England) Mervyn King; 90.20 |
Third place play-off (best of 15 legs)
| Simon Whitlock (Australia); 96.13 | 7 – 8 | (England) Mervyn King; 94.51 |
Final (best of 19 legs)
| James Wade (England); 100.08 | 8 – 10 | (England) Phil Taylor; 111.67 |
High Checkout: Phil Taylor 164 (Semi-Final)

- The play-offs were originally scheduled for 23 May, but due to a power cut in the area surrounding the Wembley Arena, they were postponed until 24 May.

==== Nine-dart finishes ====
The finals night saw the second and third nine-dart finishes of the 2010 Premier League Darts, and the third and fourth in Premier League Darts overall, in the final between Phil Taylor and James Wade.

Trailing 1–0 after losing the throw in the first leg, Taylor responded with a 174 (T20, 2 T19s), 180 (3 T20s), and 147 (T20, T17, D18) to take the second leg against throw. This was Taylor's first nine-dart finish in the Premier League, having only been achieved previously by Raymond van Barneveld. This was also the first nine-dart finish in a televised final.

In the 15th leg he hit the second nine-dart finish of the night with two 180s and checked out on 141 (T20, T19, D12). This was the first time that the same player achieved two nine-dart finishes in one match. After the second nine-darter, Taylor made it 17 consecutive perfect darts, needing only T17 D18 for a third nine-darter and second on the trot, he missed the T17 by an inch, but still went on to win that leg in 10 darts, after then hitting T18, then returning to hit the D8 with his first dart.

== Table and streaks ==
=== Table ===
| Pos | Name | Pld | W | D | L | Pts | LF | LA | +/- | LWAT | 100+ | 140+ | 180s | A | HC |
|---|---|---|---|---|---|---|---|---|---|---|---|---|---|---|---|
| 1 | (England) Phil Taylor W | 14 | 12 | 2 | 0 | 26 | 110 | 52 | +58 | 46 | 192 | 145 | 46 | 100.21 | 164 |
| 2 | (Australia) Simon Whitlock | 14 | 7 | 2 | 5 | 16 | 93 | 84 | +9 | 38 | 202 | 124 | 47 | 95.27 | 170 |
| 3 | (England) James Wade RU | 14 | 5 | 4 | 5 | 14 | 88 | 89 | −1 | 29 | 230 | 123 | 52 | 96.68 | 148 |
| 4 | (England) Mervyn King | 14 | 5 | 3 | 6 | 13 | 85 | 88 | −3 | 34 | 197 | 134 | 44 | 94.20 | 161 |
| 5 | (England) Ronnie Baxter | 14 | 4 | 5 | 5 | 13 | 89 | 96 | −7 | 36 | 249 | 138 | 33 | 95.15 | 164 |
| 6 | (Netherlands) Raymond van Barneveld | 14 | 5 | 1 | 8 | 11 | 78 | 93 | −15 | 30 | 219 | 107 | 44 | 95.91 | 141 |
| 7 | (England) Adrian Lewis | 14 | 4 | 3 | 7 | 11 | 81 | 97 | −16 | 28 | 212 | 127 | 56 | 96.06 | 140 |
| 8 | (England) Terry Jenkins | 14 | 3 | 2 | 9 | 8 | 76 | 101 | −25 | 26 | 255 | 138 | 39 | 93.86 | 146 |

Top four qualified for Play-offs after Week 14.
NB: LWAT = Legs Won Against Throw. Players separated by +/- leg difference if tied.

=== Streaks ===
| Player | Week | | | | | | | | | | | | | | Play-offs | |
| Player | 1 | 2 | 3 | 4 | 5 | 6 | 7 | 8 | 9 | 10 | 11 | 12 | 13 | 14 | SF | F |
|---|---|---|---|---|---|---|---|---|---|---|---|---|---|---|---|---|
| (England) Phil Taylor | W | W | W | W | D | W | W | W | W | D | W | W | W | W | W | W |
| (Australia) Simon Whitlock | L | D | W | L | W | L | W | L | W | W | L | D | W | W | L | |
| (England) James Wade | L | L | L | D | D | W | W | L | W | D | W | D | L | W | W | L |
| (England) Mervyn King | W | W | L | W | D | D | L | W | L | D | W | L | L | L | L | |
| (England) Ronnie Baxter | D | L | W | W | D | L | W | W | L | D | L | D | D | L | | |
| (Netherlands) Raymond van Barneveld | W | L | L | L | W | D | L | L | L | L | L | W | W | W | | |
| (England) Adrian Lewis | L | W | L | D | L | W | L | W | W | L | L | D | D | L | | |
| (England) Terry Jenkins | D | D | W | L | L | L | L | L | L | W | W | L | L | L | | |

NB: W = Won D = Drawn L = Lost

== Player statistics ==
The following statistics are for the league stage only. Playoffs are not included.

=== Phil Taylor ===
- Longest unbeaten run: 14
- Most consecutive wins: 4
- Most consecutive draws: 1
- Most consecutive losses: 0
- Longest without a win: 1
- Biggest victory: 8-1 (v. Adrian Lewis)
- Biggest defeat: Player Undefeated

=== Simon Whitlock ===
- Longest unbeaten run: 3
- Most consecutive wins: 2
- Most consecutive draws: 1
- Most consecutive losses: 1
- Longest without a win: 2
- Biggest victory: 8-2 (v. Mervyn King)
- Biggest defeat: 3-8 (v. Phil Taylor)

=== James Wade ===
- Longest unbeaten run: 4
- Most consecutive wins: 2
- Most consecutive draws: 2
- Most consecutive losses: 3
- Longest without a win: 5
- Biggest victory: 8-3 (v. Raymond van Barneveld)
- Biggest defeat: 2-8 (v. Phil Taylor)

=== Mervyn King ===
- Longest unbeaten run: 3
- Most consecutive wins: 2
- Most consecutive draws: 2
- Most consecutive losses: 3
- Longest without a win: 3
- Biggest victory: 8-2 (v. Terry Jenkins)
- Biggest defeat: 1-8 (v. Phil Taylor)

=== Ronnie Baxter ===
- Longest unbeaten run: 3
- Most consecutive wins: 2
- Most consecutive draws: 2
- Most consecutive losses: 1
- Longest without a win: 6
- Biggest victory: 8-4 (v. Raymond van Barneveld)
- Biggest defeat: 2-8 (v. Raymond van Barneveld)

=== Raymond van Barneveld ===
- Longest unbeaten run: 2
- Most consecutive wins: 2
- Most consecutive draws: 1
- Most consecutive losses: 5
- Longest without a win: 6
- Biggest victory: 8-2 (v. Ronnie Baxter)
- Biggest defeat: 2-8 (v. Phil Taylor (twice))

=== Adrian Lewis ===
- Longest unbeaten run: 2
- Most consecutive wins: 2
- Most consecutive draws: 2
- Most consecutive losses:2
- Longest without a win: 5
- Biggest victory: 8-3 (v. Raymond van Barneveld)
- Biggest defeat: 1-8 (v. Phil Taylor)

=== Terry Jenkins ===
- Longest unbeaten run: 3
- Most consecutive wins: 2
- Most consecutive draws: 2
- Most consecutive losses: 6
- Longest without a win: 6
- Biggest victory: 8-4 (v. Ronnie Baxter)
- Biggest defeat: 2-8 (v. Mervyn King)
