= 2009 World Matchplay =

2009 Stan James World Matchplay

Tournament information
- Dates: 19–26 July 2009
- Venue: Winter Gardens
- Location: Blackpool, England
- Organisation(s): Professional Darts Corporation (PDC)
- Format: Legs; Final – best of 35
- Prize fund: £400,000
- Winner's share: £100,000
- High checkout: 157 Alan Tabern

Champion(s)
- Phil Taylor (ENG)

The 2009 Stan James World Matchplay was the 16th annual staging of the World Matchplay tournament by the Professional Darts Corporation. The tournament took place from 19 to 26 July 2009. As usual it was staged at the Winter Gardens in Blackpool.

World number one Phil Taylor successfully defended his title, beating Terry Jenkins in the final to win his tenth World Matchplay.

== Prize fund ==
The prize fund was increased to £400,000, which was £100,000 more than the last World Matchplay.

Position (no. of players)		Prize money (Total: £400,000)
Winner	(1)	£100,000
Runner-Up	(1)	£50,000
Semi-finalists	(2)	£25,000
Quarter-finalists	(4)	£15,000
Second round	(8)	£7,500
First round	(16)	£5,000
Nine-dart finish	(0)	£10,000

== Qualification ==
The qualification process for the World Matchplay differed this year. The top 16 in the PDC Order of the Merit after the 2009 UK Open qualified automatically as the 16 seeds. The other 16 places would be made up of the 16 highest ranked players (not already in the top 16) from the 2009 Players Championship Order of Merit - decided by the various Player Championship events taking place on the PDC Pro Tour from January 2009 - the cutoff point was the Las Vegas Players Championship just before the 2009 Las Vegas Desert Classic.

Thus, the participants were:

=== PDC Top 16 ===
1. (England) Phil Taylor (winner)
2. (England) James Wade (quarter-finals)
3. (Netherlands) Raymond van Barneveld (quarter-finals)
4. (Canada) John Part (first round)
5. (England) Mervyn King (semi-finals)
6. (England) Terry Jenkins (runner-up)
7. (England) Ronnie Baxter (semi-finals)
8. (England) Adrian Lewis (quarter-finals)
9. (England) Colin Lloyd (second round)
10. (England) Alan Tabern (second round)
11. (England) Dennis Priestley (first round)
12. (England) Colin Osborne (first round)
13. (England) Wayne Mardle (second round)
14. (England) Mark Walsh (second round)
15. (England) Andy Hamilton (first round)
16. (England) Kevin Painter (second round)

=== PDPA Players Championship qualifiers ===
1. (Scotland) Gary Anderson (second round)
2. (Scotland) Robert Thornton (first round)
3. (England) Andy Smith (first round)
4. (England) Wayne Jones (first round)
5. (England) Mark Dudbridge (first round)
6. (Netherlands) Michael van Gerwen (first round)
7. (England) Steve Beaton (second round)
8. (Netherlands) Vincent van der Voort (quarter-finals)
9. (England) Jamie Caven (first round)
10. (England) Denis Ovens (second round)
11. (Netherlands) Jelle Klaasen (first round)
12. (Netherlands) Co Stompé (first round)
13. (England) Tony Eccles (first round)
14. (Scotland) Peter Wright (first round)
15. (England) Andy Jenkins (first round)
16. (England) Wes Newton (first round)

== Draw ==
First round (best of 19 legs); 19–22 July
1	(England) Phil Taylor 97.19	10
(Scotland) Robert Thornton 88.88	4
16	(England) Kevin Painter 101.02	10
(England) Wes Newton 91.92	3
8	(England) Adrian Lewis 93.41	10
(Netherlands) Co Stompé 95.84	7
9	(England) Colin Lloyd 87.56	10
(England) Wayne Jones 90.06	7
5	(England) Mervyn King 91.84	10
(England) Mark Dudbridge 88.28	7
12	(England) Colin Osborne 89.18	7
(England) Steve Beaton 92.86	10
4	(Canada) John Part 86.62	6
(Netherlands) Vincent van der Voort 90.63	10
13	(England) Wayne Mardle 91.26	10
(England) Tony Eccles 86.22	1
2	(England) James Wade 93.32	10
(England) Jamie Caven 86.95	3
15	(England) Andy Hamilton 91.18	6
(Scotland) Gary Anderson 99.74	10
7	(England) Ronnie Baxter 92.30	10
(Netherlands) Jelle Klaasen 92.19	8
10	(England) Alan Tabern 98.95	10
(England) Andy Smith 95.29	5
6	(England) Terry Jenkins 96.93	10
(Scotland) Peter Wright 89.39	4
11	(England) Dennis Priestley 89.06	5
(England) Denis Ovens 90.77	10
3	(Netherlands) Raymond van Barneveld 99.73	10
(Netherlands) Michael van Gerwen 91.26	3
14	(England) Mark Walsh 89.60	10
(England) Andy Jenkins 85.31	5

Second round (best of 25 legs); 22–23 July
1	(England) Phil Taylor 109.47	13
16	(England) Kevin Painter 92.39	3
8	(England) Adrian Lewis 95.39	13
9	(England) Colin Lloyd 84.80	5
5	(England) Mervyn King 96.90	13
(England) Steve Beaton 92.30	8
(Netherlands) Vincent van der Voort 92.34	13
13	(England) Wayne Mardle 83.28	6
2	(England) James Wade 96.29	13
(Scotland) Gary Anderson 96.22	7
7	(England) Ronnie Baxter 90.20	16
10	(England) Alan Tabern 86.41	14
6	(England) Terry Jenkins 92.06	14
(England) Denis Ovens 90.48	12
3	(Netherlands) Raymond van Barneveld 94.81	13
14	(England) Mark Walsh 94.44	11

Quarter-finals (best of 31 legs); 24 July
1	(England) Phil Taylor 109.42	16
8	(England) Adrian Lewis 92.27	3
5	(England) Mervyn King 100.96	16
(Netherlands) Vincent van der Voort 94.75	6
2	(England) James Wade 97.57	10
7	(England) Ronnie Baxter 96.73	16
6	(England) Terry Jenkins 97.57	16
3	(Netherlands) Raymond van Barneveld 99.76	12

Semi-finals (best of 33 legs); 25 July
1	(England) Phil Taylor 106.54	17
5	(England) Mervyn King 95.51	6
7	(England) Ronnie Baxter 94.18	12
6	(England) Terry Jenkins 91.54	17

Final (best of 35 legs); 26 July
1	(England) Phil Taylor 106.05	18
6	(England) Terry Jenkins 92.32	4

== Statistics ==
Player	Eliminated	Played	Legs Won	Legs Lost	LWAT	100+	140+	180s	High Checkout	3-dart Average
(England) Phil Taylor	Winner	5	74	20	34	130	77	44	144	105.73
(England) Terry Jenkins	Final	5	61	58	20	157	80	26	131	94.08
(England) Mervyn King	Semi-finals	4	45	38	16	112	66	18	147	96.30
(England) Ronnie Baxter	Semi-finals	4	54	49	18	142	49	19	132	93.35
(Netherlands) Raymond van Barneveld	Quarter-finals	3	35	30	9	85	43	17	126	98.10
(Netherlands) Vincent van der Voort	Quarter-finals	3	29	28	9	71	42	13	131	92.57
(England) James Wade	Quarter-finals	3	33	26	10	75	47	12	153	95.73
(England) Adrian Lewis	Quarter-finals	3	26	28	13	63	40	13	156	93.69
(England) Wayne Mardle	Second round	2	16	14	6	36	22	4	115	87.27
(Scotland) Gary Anderson	Second round	2	17	19	4	42	28	10	151	97.98
(England) Kevin Painter	Second round	2	13	16	5	32	18	8	130	96.71
(England) Alan Tabern	Second round	2	24	21	8	66	32	7	157	92.68
(England) Steve Beaton	Second round	2	18	20	8	52	23	5	110	92.58
(England) Colin Lloyd	Second round	2	15	20	8	46	17	5	62	86.18
(England) Mark Walsh	Second round	2	21	18	9	49	26	9	121	92.02
(England) Denis Ovens	Second round	2	22	19	12	64	32	5	125	90.63
(England) Andy Hamilton	First round	1	6	10	2	21	7	4	120	91.18
(England) Wayne Jones	First round	1	7	10	4	26	12	4	121	90.06
(England) Jamie Caven	First round	1	3	10	0	13	6	2	120	86.95
(Canada) John Part	First round	1	6	10	2	19	5	4	76	86.62
(Netherlands) Jelle Klaasen	First round	1	8	10	2	24	4	4	71	92.19
(England) Tony Eccles	First round	1	1	10	0	11	10	0	76	86.22
(Netherlands) Co Stompé	First round	1	7	10	2	26	9	4	127	95.84
(Scotland) Peter Wright	First round	1	4	10	1	17	9	2	96	89.39
(England) Colin Osborne	First round	1	7	10	4	18	13	2	116	89.18
(England) Dennis Priestley	First round	1	5	10	3	22	13	2	84	89.06
(Scotland) Robert Thornton	First round	1	4	10	1	17	9	3	56	88.88
(England) Mark Dudbridge	First round	1	7	10	5	17	10	3	109	88.28
(England) Andy Smith	First round	1	5	10	1	19	15	1	112	95.29
(England) Wes Newton	First round	1	3	10	1	16	3	5	96	91.92
(Netherlands) Michael van Gerwen	First round	1	3	10	0	14	6	1	126	91.26
(England) Andy Jenkins	First round	1	5	10	4	15	10	1	96	85.31
