= Terry Jenkins =

English darts player (born 1963)

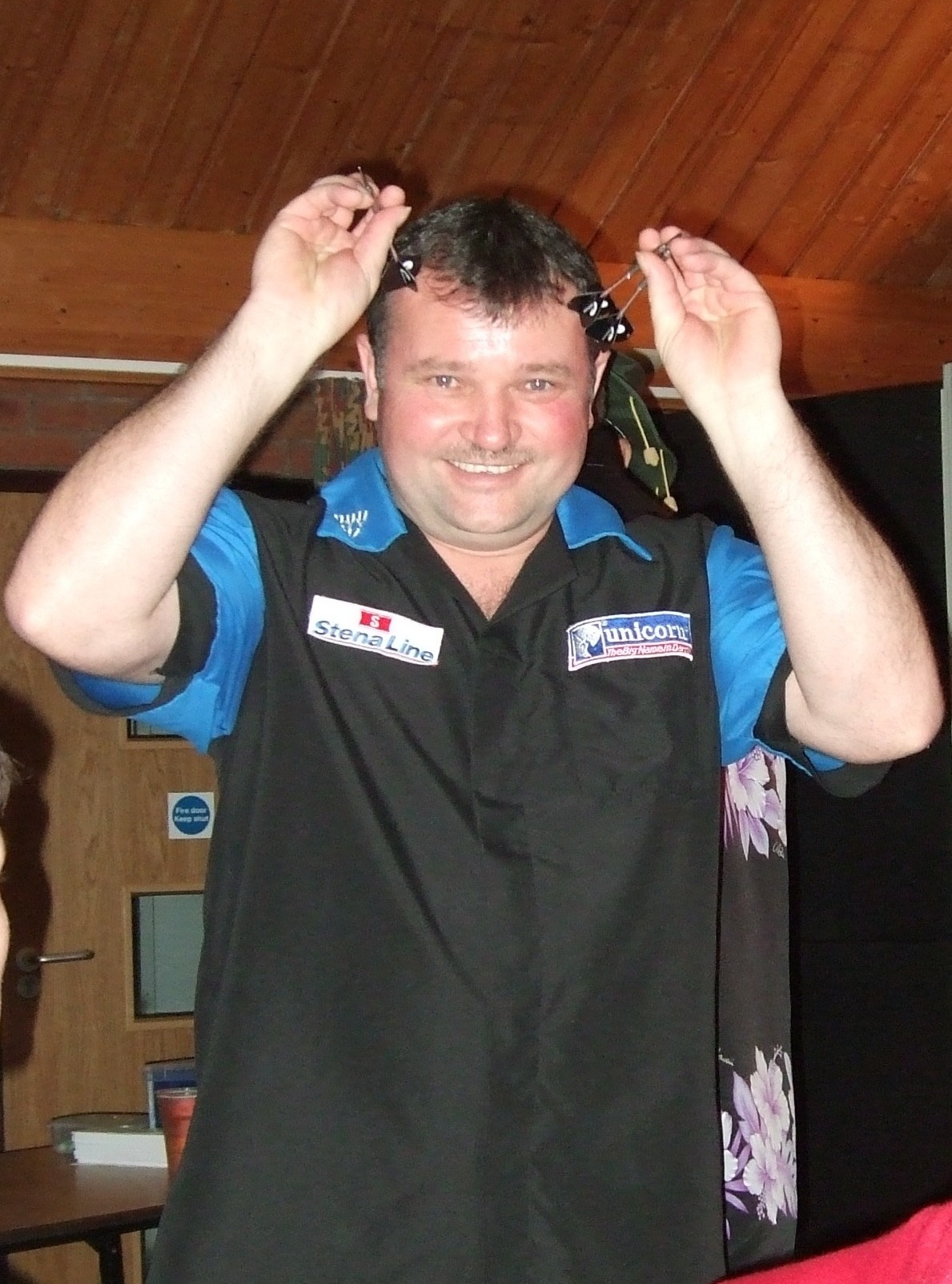
- Jenkins in 2010

Personal information
- Nicknames: "Tucker" "The Bull"
- Born: 26 September 1963 (age 63) Ledbury, England

Sport
- Sport: Darts
- Playing since: 1977
- Darts: 21g Unicorn Signature
- Laterality: Right-handed
- Walk-on music: "Wooly Bully" by Sam the Sham & The Pharaohs preceded opening to "Supermoon" by Garden Centre

Organisation (see split in darts)
- BDO: 1993–2003
- PDC: 2003–2018 (Tour Card: 2011–2018)

WDF major events – best performances
- World Masters: Quarter-final: 2003
- World Trophy: Quarter-final: 2007
- Int. Darts League: Group Stage: 2007

PDC premier events – best performances
- World Championship: Semi-final: 2011
- World Matchplay: Runner-up: 2007, 2009
- World Grand Prix: Runner-up: 2006, 2007
- UK Open: Runner-up: 2014
- Grand Slam: Runner-up: 2008
- European Championship: Runner-up: 2014
- Premier League: Runner-up: 2007
- Desert Classic: Runner-up: 2007
- PC Finals: Quarter-final: 2011, 2014
- Masters: Quarter-final: 2015

WSDT major events – best performances
- World Championship: Semi-final: 2022
- World Matchplay: Quarter-final: 2022
- World Masters: Last 20: 2022

Other tournament wins
- Years
Antwerp Darts Trophy	2007
Antwerp Open	2005, 2006, 2007
Bob Anderson Classic	2004
Bobby Bourn Memorial Trophy	2009
Open Hotel Zwartewater	2005, 2006
Open Oust Nederland	2003
Sunparks Masters	2005
Swindon Open	2006
UK Open Qualifier	2012
ADC Red Dragon National Singles	2022
Players Championships (x6)
2007 (x2), 2008, 2009, 2014, 2015

Terry Jenkins (born 26 September 1963) is an English former professional darts player who competed in the British Darts Organisation (BDO) and the Professional Darts Corporation (PDC). Nicknamed "The Bull", and previously known as "Tucker", he reached a career-high ranking of world number four and appeared in nine major PDC televised finals without winning a title. His best performance at the PDC World Darts Championship was reaching the semi-finals in 2011. After stepping away from the PDC circuit, Jenkins returned to competitive darts on the World Seniors Darts Tour, reaching the semi-finals of the inaugural World Seniors Darts Championship in 2022.

== Darts career ==
=== Early career and breakthrough (1993–2006) ===
Jenkins began his competitive darts career in the British Darts Organisation (BDO), appearing in open tournaments from the early 1990s. He competed at the World Masters on several occasions, reaching the quarter-finals in 2003, where he lost 3–1 to Raymond van Barneveld. Although he never qualified for the BDO World Championship, he established himself as a successful player on the open circuit before switching to the Professional Darts Corporation (PDC) in 2003.

Jenkins began climbing the PDC rankings in 2005 following a series of strong performances in non-televised tournaments, including victories at the Primus Masters and Antwerp Open. He made his PDC World Darts Championship debut that year, reaching the third round before losing 4–2 to Ronnie Baxter.

His first major breakthrough on television came in 2006. After reaching the quarter-finals of the 2006 Las Vegas Desert Classic, Jenkins advanced to his first major PDC final at the World Grand Prix. He lost 7–4 in sets to Phil Taylor, but his performances helped him rise to sixth in the world rankings and qualify for the 2007 Premier League.

=== Major finals and rise to world number four (2007–2009) ===
The 2007 season was one of the most successful of Jenkins' career. He reached the quarter-finals of the 2007 PDC World Darts Championship, losing a deciding-set match to Andy Hamilton. Making his debut in the Premier League, Jenkins defeated reigning world champion Raymond van Barneveld in the semi-finals before losing 16–6 to Taylor in the final.

Jenkins continued his strong form throughout the year. He reached the final of the 2007 Las Vegas Desert Classic, where he lost 13–6 to Van Barneveld, and advanced to the 2007 World Matchplay final after defeating Taylor in the semi-finals. However, he was beaten 18–7 by James Wade in the final. At the World Grand Prix, Jenkins reached his fourth major final of the season, again losing to Wade, this time 6–3 in sets. He also won two Players Championship titles during the year and rose to a career-high world ranking of fourth.

His 2008 season began with a first-round defeat to Kirk Shepherd at the 2008 PDC World Darts Championship. Jenkins had led 2–1 in sets but missed several opportunities to secure victory against the eventual finalist. He subsequently finished seventh in the Premier League and experienced a number of early exits from major tournaments. Nevertheless, he returned to a televised final at the 2008 Grand Slam of Darts, where he was defeated 18–9 by Taylor.

Jenkins won the Bobby Bourn Memorial Players Championship in early 2009 and continued to perform consistently on the professional circuit. His best result of the season came at the 2009 World Matchplay, where he reached the final for the second time in three years. Once again, Taylor proved too strong, winning 18–4. Jenkins also advanced to the semi-finals of the World Grand Prix, losing to Taylor, and the 2009 Grand Slam of Darts, where he was defeated by Scott Waites. He remained among the world's leading players despite having lost all seven of his major PDC finals to that point.

=== World Championship semi-final and continued success (2010–2013) ===
Jenkins reached the third round of the 2010 PDC World Darts Championship, defeating Paul Nicholson and Darin Young before losing 4–2 to Simon Whitlock. His Premier League campaign was disappointing, as he finished bottom of the table. However, he returned to form at the European Championship, reaching the semi-finals before suffering a narrow 11–10 defeat to Taylor. He also advanced to the quarter-finals of the 2010 Grand Slam of Darts.

Jenkins achieved his best result at the PDC World Championship in 2011. He defeated Joe Cullen, Steve Brown and Mark Walsh to reach the quarter-finals, where he overcame Wes Newton while recording a 170 checkout. His run ended in the semi-finals with a 6–2 defeat to Gary Anderson. Following the tournament, Jenkins received a wildcard invitation to the Premier League, although he was unable to qualify for the play-offs.

At the 2012 PDC World Darts Championship, Jenkins again progressed to the quarter-finals after defeating Cullen, Co Stompé and Justin Pipe. Facing defending champion Adrian Lewis, he recovered from a 3–0 deficit in sets to level the match at 3–3, but eventually lost 5–3.

In May 2012, Jenkins won the seventh UK Open Qualifier, defeating Hamilton 6–3 in the final. He subsequently reached the quarter-finals of the 2012 UK Open and the semi-finals of the 2012 World Matchplay. At the latter tournament, he defeated Kim Huybrechts, Van Barneveld and Lewis before losing 17–15 to Wade in a closely contested semi-final.

In 2013, Jenkins reached the third round of the World Championship, where he lost 4–1 to Hamilton despite averaging 100.39. At the 2013 World Matchplay, he narrowly lost 14–12 to Taylor in the second round after recovering from a four-leg deficit to take the lead late in the match.

Later that year, Jenkins won Group Four of the Championship League Darts. Having topped the group standings, he defeated Anderson 6–1 in the semi-finals before beating Michael van Gerwen 6–5 in the final. Van Gerwen recorded a nine-dart finish during the match, but Jenkins won the deciding leg to progress to the Winners Group.

=== Return to major finals (2014–2015) ===
At the 2014 PDC World Darts Championship, held in December 2013, Jenkins achieved his first televised nine-dart finish, against Per Laursen in the deciding set of their first-round match. He also recorded a 170 checkout, but lost 3–2 in sets. Kyle Anderson also achieved a nine-dart finish on the same day, resulting in the two players sharing the tournament's bonus for a perfect leg.

Jenkins enjoyed a resurgence during 2014, reaching two further major televised finals. At the 2014 UK Open, he defeated Wade 9–8 in the fourth round, Brendan Dolan 10–4 in the quarter-finals and world number one Van Gerwen 10–8 in the semi-finals. However, Lewis produced a dominant performance in the final, defeating Jenkins 11–1.

Jenkins won the tenth Players Championship event of 2014, beating Stephen Bunting 6–3 in the final. Later in the season, he advanced to the final of the European Championship, where he lost 11–4 to Van Gerwen. It was his ninth major PDC televised final without a victory. He also reached the quarter-finals of the 2014 Players Championship Finals, defeating Van Gerwen before losing to Newton.

At the 2015 PDC World Darts Championship, Jenkins reached the third round before losing 4–1 to Van Gerwen. He subsequently advanced to the quarter-finals of The Masters after beating Taylor 10–7, but lost 10–3 to Van Barneveld.

In March, Jenkins reached his first PDC European Tour final at the 2015 Gibraltar Darts Trophy. He defeated Anderson, Mervyn King and defending champion Wade on the final day before losing 6–3 to Van Gerwen.

On his 52nd birthday, 26 September 2015, Jenkins won the fifteenth Players Championship event in Barnsley, defeating Peter Wright 6–4 in the final with a three-dart average of 108.02. He also reached the quarter-finals of the inaugural 2015 World Series of Darts Finals, where he lost 10–6 to Lewis.

=== Final PDC seasons and retirement (2016–2018) ===
Jenkins was eliminated in the second round of the 2016 PDC World Darts Championship, losing 4–0 to Mark Webster. He reached the fourth round of the 2016 UK Open and the second round of both the 2016 World Matchplay and World Grand Prix.

His most notable result on the 2016 ProTour came at the twelfth Players Championship event in Barnsley, where he defeated Steve Beaton and James Wilson to reach the final. He narrowly lost 6–5 to Anderson.

Ahead of the 2017 PDC World Darts Championship, Jenkins announced plans to substantially reduce his participation on the PDC circuit. He cited the demands of travelling to tournaments and intended to spend more time on exhibitions and his antiques business.

At the World Championship, Jenkins defeated Josh Payne in the first round before facing Benito van de Pas in the second. He recovered from a 3–1 deficit to level the match at 3–3, but missed a match dart and eventually lost 4–3. This proved to be his final appearance at the PDC World Championship.

Following his decision to reduce his tournament schedule, Jenkins failed to qualify for the 2018 World Championship, ending a run of 13 consecutive appearances from 2005 to 2017. He made his final appearances on the PDC circuit in 2018, effectively bringing his full-time professional career to an end.

=== Senior darts career (2022–2024) ===
After several years away from the professional circuit, Jenkins returned to competitive darts through the World Seniors Darts Tour (WSDT).

At the inaugural 2022 World Seniors Darts Championship, held at the Circus Tavern in Purfleet, Jenkins defeated Roland Scholten 3–0 in the first round and Lisa Ashton 3–1 in the second round. He then overcame John Walton 3–1 to reach the semi-finals, where he lost 4–2 to Martin Adams.

Later that year, Jenkins reached the quarter-finals of the 2022 World Seniors Darts Matchplay. After defeating Baxter 8–5 in the second round, he was eliminated by eventual champion Robert Thornton, losing 8–6. He also recorded a 170 checkout during the tournament.

Jenkins returned to the World Seniors Darts Championship in 2023, entering as the thirteenth seed. He defeated Chris Mason 3–2 in the first round before losing 3–1 to Mark Dudbridge in the second round.

At the 2024 World Seniors Darts Championship, Jenkins was again seeded thirteenth. He faced Paul Hogan in the first round but was defeated 3–1 in sets, despite recording a three-dart average of 81.38.

== World Championship results ==
=== PDC ===
- 2005: Third round (lost to Ronnie Baxter 2–4)
- 2006: Second round (lost to Andy Hamilton 1–4)
- 2007: Quarter-finals (lost to Andy Hamilton 4–5)
- 2008: First round (lost to Kirk Shepherd 2–3)
- 2009: First round (lost to Dennis Smith 1–3)
- 2010: Third round (lost to Simon Whitlock 2–4)
- 2011: Semi-finals (lost to Gary Anderson 2–6)
- 2012: Quarter-finals (lost to Adrian Lewis 3–5)
- 2013: Third round (lost to Andy Hamilton 1–4)
- 2014: First round (lost to Per Laursen 2–3)
- 2015: Third round (lost to Michael van Gerwen 1–4)
- 2016: Second round (lost to Mark Webster 0–4)
- 2017: Second round (lost to Benito van de Pas 3–4)

=== WSDT ===
- 2022: Semi-finals (lost to Martin Adams 2–4)
- 2023: Second round (lost to Mark Dudbridge 1–3)
- 2024: First round (lost to Paul Hogan 1–3)

== Performance timeline ==
=== BDO ===
Tournament	1996	1998	2003	2007
BDO Ranked televised events
World Masters	2R	4R	QF	PDC
World Darts Trophy	DNP			QF
International Darts League	DNP			RR

=== WSDT ===
Tournament	2022	2023	2024
World Seniors Darts Tour
World Seniors Darts Championship	SF	2R	1R
World Seniors Darts Masters	Prel.	DNP	
World Seniors Darts Matchplay	QF	DNP	

=== PDC ===
Tournament	2003	2004	2005	2006	2007	2008	2009	2010	2011		2012	2013	2014	2015	2016	2017	2018
PDC Ranked televised events
PDC World Championship	DNP		3R	2R	QF	1R	1R	3R	SF		QF	3R	1R	3R	2R	2R	DNQ
UK Open	3R	3R	4R	5R	QF	4R	QF	3R	4R		QF	5R	F	3R	4R	2R	1R
World Matchplay	1R	DNQ	2R	1R	F	2R	F	1R	1R		SF	2R	1R	1R	2R	DNQ	
World Grand Prix	DNP		1R	F	F	SF	SF	2R	1R		1R	1R	2R	2R	2R	DNQ	
European Championship	Not held					1R	1R	SF	2R		1R	1R	F	1R	1R	DNQ	
Grand Slam of Darts	Not held				QF	F	SF	QF	QF		RR	DNQ	2R	2R	DNQ		
Players Championship Finals	Not held						1R	2R	QF	1R	1R	2R	QF	1R	3R	DNQ	
PDC Non-ranked televised events
Premier League Darts	Not held		DNP		F	7th	5th	8th	7th		DNP						
Masters	Not held											1R	DNQ	QF	1R	DNQ	
World Series of Darts Finals	Not held													QF	DNQ		
PDC Past major events
Las Vegas Desert Classic	RR	DNQ		QF	F	2R	QF	Not held									
World Series of Darts (2006)	Not held			2R	Not held												
US Open	Not held				3R	2R	Not held										
Championship League Darts	Not held					RR	RR	RR	RR		RR	RR	Not held				
Career statistics
Year-end ranking	NR	NR	15	6	4	5	6	7	10		9	17	16	11	18	34	71

==== PDC European Tour ====
Season	1	2	3	4	5	6	7	8	9	10	11	12	13
2012	ADO; 2R	GDC; 3R	EDO; 1R	GDM; 3R	DDM; 1R								
2013	UKM; 2R	EDT; 2R	EDO; 3R	ADO; 2R	DNP	GDC; 2R	GDM; 2R	DDM; 1R					
2014	GDC; 3R	DDM; 2R	DNP	ADO; 2R	DNQ	DNP	EDG; QF	EDT; 3R					
2015	GDC; 2R	GDT; F	GDM; 3R	DDM; SF	IDO; QF	EDO; 3R	EDT; QF	EDM; 3R	EDG; 2R				
2016	DDM; 3R	GDM; 2R	GDT; 2R	EDM; 3R	ADO; SF	EDO; QF	IDO; 3R	EDG; 2R	GDC; 3R	EDT; 3R			
2017	Did not participate												
2018	DNQ		GDO; 1R	DNQ		DDM; 2R	DNQ			GDC; 3R	DNQ	IDO; 2R	DNQ

==== PDC Players Championships ====
Season	1	2	3	4	5	6	7	8	9	10	11	12	13	14	15	16	17	18	19	20	21	22	23	24	25	26	27	28	29	30	31	32	33	34	35	36	37
2004	DNP	NEW; 2R	DUB; 3R	ROT; 2R	EDI; QF																																
2005	DNP	IOW; 3R	DNP	NEW; 2R	DUB; 3R	IRV; QF	LIS; 3R	LIS; 2R																													
2006	GIB; F	DNP	HAY; 3R	BLA; 1R	NEW; 3R	DUB; 4R	IRV; SF	LIS; SF	LIS; QF																												
2007	GIB; 1R	GIB; QF	BAD; 4R	ANT; W	SCH; SF	HEE; 1R	HAY; W	HAY; 3R	LAS; F	BLA; 1R	ATL; 3R	DNP	CHI; 4R	NEW; 1R	DUB; QF	IRV; 1R	KIR; 4R	DNP	LIS; 3R	LIS; 3R																	
2008	GIB; 4R	GIB; 4R	BRE; 4R	WIG; 4R	BAD; 3R	BAD; 3R	TEL; 1R	ANT; 4R	GLA; 2R	SCH; 3R	BRI; 4R	BRI; 1R	LAS; QF	BLA; 4R	DNP	KIT; 3R	ATL; 3R	VEL; 3R	VEL; F	DNP	CHI; 4R	NEW; 1R	NEW; 1R	DUB; 3R	DUB; 2R	IRV; SF	IRV; 3R	DIN; 3R	KIL; W	LEI; 3R	LEI; 2R						
2009	DON; W	GIB; 4R	GIB; 3R	GLA; 3R	GLA; 3R	IRV; 3R	WIG; 1R	BRE; QF	COV; SF	NUL; SF	NUL; 2R	TAU; 2R	DNP	NEW; 4R	BAR; 3R	BAR; 3R	DIN; 2R	DIN; QF	LAS; 1R	SYD; 2R	LON; QF	ATL; 4R	SAL; 2R	SAL; 4R	DUB; 2R	DUB; 3R	KIL; 2R	NUL; 3R	NUL; 4R	DNP							
2010	GIB; 3R	GIB; QF	SWI; 4R	DER; F	DNP		WIG; 3R	DNP	BAR; 2R	DER; 2R	WIG; 4R	WIG; 2R	DNP		BAR; 2R	BAR; 1R	DNP		LAS; QF	LAS; 2R	LAS; 4R	DNP			CRA; 2R	CRA; 3R	NUL; F	NUL; 4R	DUB; 1R	DUB; 3R	DNP	NAU; 3R	NAU; 1R	BAR; QF	BAR; 2R	DER; 4R	DER; 4R
2011	HAL; 4R	HAL; 4R	DER; 4R	DER; 2R	CRA; 2R	CRA; 3R	WIE; 2R	WIE; 3R	CRA; F	CRA; F	BAR; 4R	BAR; 2R	Did not participate				DER; 3R	DER; 2R	DNP		DUB; 3R	DUB; 3R	DNP	GLA; 3R	GLA; 4R	DNP		CRA; 2R	CRA; 2R	WIG; 1R	WIG; QF						
2012	BEN; 4R	BEN; 3R	REA; QF	REA; 1R	CRA; SF	CRA; QF	BIR; QF	BIR; 2R	CRA; 3R	CRA; QF	BAR; SF	BAR; 4R	DUB; 3R	DUB; 2R	DNP		CRA; QF	CRA; QF	BAR; 1R	BAR; 1R																	
2013	WIG; 2R	WIG; 1R	WIG; 1R	WIG; 3R	CRA; QF	CRA; 4R	BAR; 3R	BAR; 1R	DUB; 4R	DUB; 2R	Did not participate				BAR; 4R	BAR; SF																					
2014	BAR; 2R	BAR; 2R	CRA; QF	CRA; 4R	WIG; 2R	WIG; 4R	WIG; 2R	WIG; F	CRA; 3R	CRA; W	COV; 3R	COV; 3R	CRA; 3R	CRA; 2R	DUB; 2R	DUB; 2R	CRA; 1R	CRA; QF	COV; 4R	COV; 2R																	
2015	BAR; 3R	BAR; 1R	BAR; 4R	BAR; 3R	BAR; 1R	COV; 1R	COV; SF	COV; 1R	CRA; 4R	CRA; 2R	BAR; 4R	BAR; 1R	WIG; 1R	WIG; 1R	BAR; W	BAR; 3R	DUB; 3R	DUB; 1R	COV; 2R	COV; 4R																	
2016	BAR; 4R	BAR; 3R	BAR; 3R	BAR; 3R	BAR; 1R	BAR; 1R	BAR; 4R	COV; 1R	COV; 2R	BAR; 1R	BAR; 1R	BAR; F	BAR; 2R	BAR; 1R	BAR; 1R	BAR; 2R	DUB; 1R	DUB; 1R	BAR; 4R	BAR; 1R																	
2017	Did not participate																				BAR; 3R	BAR; 2R															
2018	BAR; 4R	BAR; 1R	BAR; 1R	BAR; 2R	MIL; 4R	MIL; 1R	BAR; 1R	BAR; 1R	DNP		MIL; 1R	MIL; 1R	WIG; 3R	WIG; 1R	BAR; 2R	BAR; 1R	BAR; 2R	BAR; 1R	DUB; 1R	DUB; 2R	BAR; 4R	BAR; 1R															

Performance Table Legend
W	Won the tournament	F	Finalist	SF	Semifinalist	QF	Quarterfinalist	#R; RR; Prel.	Lost in # round Round-robin; Preliminary round	DQ	Disqualified
DNQ	Did not qualify	DNP	Did not participate	WD	Withdrew	NH	Tournament not held	#R; RR; Prel.	Lost in # round Round-robin; Preliminary round	NYF	Not yet founded

=== PDC major finals: 9 ===
Legend
World Matchplay (0–2)
World Grand Prix (0–2)
Grand Slam (0–1)
Premier League (0–1)
UK Open (0–1)
European Championship (0–1)
Las Vegas Desert Classic (0–1)

Outcome	No.	Year	Championship	Opponent in the final	Score (Note: (l) = score in legs, (s) = score in sets.)
Runner-up	1.	2006	World Grand Prix	Phil Taylor	4–7 (s)
Runner-up	2.	2007	Premier League	Phil Taylor	6–16 (l)
Runner-up	3.	2007	Las Vegas Desert Classic	Raymond van Barneveld	6–13 (l)
Runner-up	4.	2007	World Matchplay	James Wade	7–18 (l)
Runner-up	5.	2007	World Grand Prix (2)	James Wade	3–6 (s)
Runner-up	6.	2008	Grand Slam	Phil Taylor	9–18 (l)
Runner-up	7.	2009	World Matchplay (2)	Phil Taylor	4–18 (l)
Runner-up	8.	2014	UK Open	Adrian Lewis	1–11 (l)
Runner-up	9.	2014	European Championship	Michael van Gerwen	4–11 (l)

=== PDC European tour finals: 1 ===
Legend
Other (0–1)

Outcome	No.	Year	Championship	Opponent in the final	Score
Runner-up	1.	2015	Gibraltar Darts Trophy	Michael van Gerwen	3–6 (l)

== Nine-dart finishes ==
Terry Jenkins' televised nine-dart finishes
Date	Opponent	Tournament	Method	Prize
14 December 2013	(Denmark) Per Laursen	World Championship	3 x T20; 3 x T20; T20, T19, D12	£15,000
