= 2007 World Matchplay =

2007 Stan James World Matchplay

Tournament information
- Dates: 22–28 July 2007
- Venue: Winter Gardens
- Location: Blackpool, England
- Organisation(s): Professional Darts Corporation (PDC)
- Format: Legs
- Prize fund: £200,000
- Winner's share: £50,000
- High checkout: 170 Kevin Painter

Champion(s)
- James Wade (ENG)

The 2007 Stan James World Matchplay was the 14th annual staging of the World Matchplay darts tournament by the Professional Darts Corporation. It was held at its traditional home, the Winter Gardens, Blackpool, between 22 and 28 July 2007. James Wade won his first major title, defeating Terry Jenkins 18–7 in the final.

Defending and eight times champion, Phil Taylor suffered a semi-final defeat to Jenkins, meaning that he had surrendered both the World Championship and World Matchplay titles for the first time since the PDC began in 1994. Raymond van Barneveld, who went into this event having won the first three Sky TV majors of the year (World Championship, UK Open and Las Vegas Desert Classic) saw his hopes of the clean-sweep evaporate with a quarter-final defeat to Adrian Lewis. Barneveld was making his debut in the event having failed to qualify in 2006.

Both Lewis and Jenkins suffered hangovers from their victories over the two favourites as they lost their next matches - with James Wade capitalising. He beat Lewis in the semi-final and Jenkins in the final. Wade became the youngest winner of a PDC televised title at the age of 24 and also rose to number three in the world rankings.

== Prize fund ==
Position (no. of players)		Prize money (Total: £200,000)
Winner	(1)	£50,000
Runner-Up	(1)	£20,000
Semi-finalists	(2)	£10,000
Quarter-finalists	(4)	£7,500
Second round	(8)	£5,000
First round	(16)	£2,500
Nine-dart finish	(0)	£10,000

== Qualification ==
=== PDC Top 16 ===
1. (England) Phil Taylor (semi-finals)
2. (Netherlands) Raymond van Barneveld (quarter-finals)
3. (England) Colin Lloyd (first round)
4. (England) Peter Manley (first round)
5. (England) Terry Jenkins (runner-up)
6. (England) Dennis Priestley (second round)
7. (England) Adrian Lewis (semi-finals)
8. (England) Wayne Mardle (second round)
9. (Netherlands) Roland Scholten (quarter-finals)
10. (England) Andy Hamilton (second round)
11. (England) James Wade (winner)
12. (Canada) John Part (second round)
13. (England) Ronnie Baxter (quarter-finals)
14. (England) Andy Jenkins (second round)
15. (Wales) Barrie Bates (second round)
16. (England) Kevin Painter (second round)

=== PDPA Players Championship qualifiers ===
1. (England) Chris Mason (first round)
2. (England) Mark Dudbridge (first round)
3. (England) Mark Walsh (first round)
4. (England) Colin Osborne (first round)
5. (England) Denis Ovens (first round)
6. (England) Wayne Jones (first round)
7. (England) Alan Tabern (first round)
8. (England) Wes Newton (first round)
9. (England) Andy Smith (first round)
10. (England) Alan Warriner-Little (first round)
11. (Republic of Ireland) Mick McGowan (first round)
12. (England) Mervyn King (quarter-finals)
13. (Netherlands) Michael van Gerwen (second round)
14. (England) Adrian Gray (first round)
15. (England) Steve Beaton (first round)
16. (England) Bob Anderson (first round)

== Draw ==
First round (best of 19 legs); 22–24 July
1	(England) Phil Taylor 97.89	10
(England) Wes Newton 84.07	2
16	(England) Kevin Painter 89.78	12
(England) Adrian Gray 84.79	10
8	(England) Wayne Mardle 89.38	10
(England) Mark Dudbridge 87.09	7
9	(Netherlands) Roland Scholten 90.58	13
(England) Chris Mason 88.63	11
5	(England) Terry Jenkins 95.23	10
(England) Alan Tabern 92.79	5
12	(Canada) John Part 94.62	10
(England) Alan Warriner-Little 85.00	5
4	(England) Peter Manley 79.57	9
(Netherlands) Michael van Gerwen 88.00	11
13	(England) Ronnie Baxter 85.61	10
(England) Bob Anderson 84.78	6
2	(Netherlands) Raymond van Barneveld 95.62	10
(England) Denis Ovens 94.81	7
15	(Wales) Barrie Bates 92.36	10
(England) Andy Smith 85.32	8
7	(England) Adrian Lewis 90.00	10
(England) Steve Beaton 83.24	4
10	(England) Andy Hamilton 79.63	10
(Republic of Ireland) Mick McGowan 73.68	6
6	(England) Dennis Priestley 93.13	10
(England) Colin Osborne 92.31	5
11	(England) James Wade 88.88	10
(England) Wayne Jones 87.40	7
3	(England) Colin Lloyd 89.62	4
(England) Mervyn King 92.08	10
14	(England) Andy Jenkins 88.89	10
(England) Mark Walsh 89.58	6

Second round (best of 25 legs); 24–25 July
1	(England) Phil Taylor 101.15	13
16	(England) Kevin Painter 95.40	6
8	(England) Wayne Mardle 94.40	6
9	(Netherlands) Roland Scholten 93.25	13
5	(England) Terry Jenkins 92.98	13
12	(Canada) John Part 91.83	8
(Netherlands) Michael van Gerwen 87.81	12
13	(England) Ronnie Baxter 87.75	14
2	(Netherlands) Raymond van Barneveld 100.53	13
15	(Wales) Barrie Bates 83.27	5
7	(England) Adrian Lewis 100.45	13
10	(England) Andy Hamilton 93.42	9
6	(England) Dennis Priestley 90.89	14
11	(England) James Wade 86.67	16
(England) Mervyn King 96.85	13
14	(England) Andy Jenkins 91.88	4

Quarter-finals (best of 31 legs); 26 July
1	(England) Phil Taylor 97.06	16
9	(Netherlands) Roland Scholten 85.33	1
5	(England) Terry Jenkins 91.61	16
13	(England) Ronnie Baxter 87.03	13
2	(Netherlands) Raymond van Barneveld 94.25	14
7	(England) Adrian Lewis 96.81	16
11	(England) James Wade 89.53	16
(England) Mervyn King 88.58	11

Semi-finals (best of 33 legs); 27 July
1	(England) Phil Taylor 98.44	11
5	(England) Terry Jenkins 96.33	17
7	(England) Adrian Lewis 101.26	7
11	(England) James Wade 101.90	17

Final (best of 35 legs); 28 July
5	(England) Terry Jenkins 91.62	7
11	(England) James Wade 96.83	18

== Television coverage ==
Sky Sports broadcast the event live in the UK & Ireland for the 14th year running. The final between Wade & Jenkins achieved viewing figures of 183,000 - although that was surpassed by the quarter-finals on Thursday (188,000) and the semi-finals on Friday received the highest viewing figures with 240,000 (the third highest-rated programme on Sky Sports 1 for that week)
