= Premier League Darts =

Darts tournament

- Current season, competition or edition: 2026 Premier League Darts
- Founded: 2005
- First season: 2005
- Organizing body: Professional Darts Corporation (PDC)
- Countries: United Kingdom, Ireland, Netherlands, Germany, Belgium
- Most recent champion: Luke Littler (ENG) (2026)
- Tournament format: Legs

Premier League Darts, known for sponsorship purposes as BetMGM Premier League Darts, is a darts tournament which launched on 20 January 2005 on Sky Sports. Now played weekly from February to May, the event originally started as a fortnightly fixture in small venues around the United Kingdom. The tournament originally featured seven players, gradually expanded to ten by 2013, before reduced again from 2022 to eight players from the Professional Darts Corporation circuit competing in a knockout style format, with nights also hosted in Europe at different venues. The top four players in the PDC Order of Merit are joined by four wildcard selections to make up the eight-person field. Alongside the World Championship and the World Matchplay, it is considered part of the sport's Triple Crown.

While active, Phil Taylor dominated the event, winning six of the thirteen tournaments he appeared in. He went unbeaten throughout the first three seasons before James Wade ended his 44 match run in the first match of the 2008 season. A new champion was to be crowned after Mervyn King defeated him in the 2009 semi-finals, where Wade defeated King 13–8 in the final, to pick up the £125,000 first prize. Taylor defeated Wade the following season to claim his fifth title in the competition in 2010, achieving two nine-dart finishes in the final, the only player to achieve this accomplishment.

Although there have been nine overall winners of the Premier League, the league stage has been dominated by Taylor and Michael van Gerwen, with Taylor topping the table for each of the first eight editions and van Gerwen winning the next seven. In 2020, Glen Durrant became the third player to finish top after all league fixtures had been completed. He went on to win the title, meaning all three players both topped the table and won the play-offs at their first attempt. In 2024, this feat was then repeated by Luke Littler who became the fourth player to both top the table following the completion of the league stage and then win the play-offs on their debut Premier League appearance.

The prize fund has risen from £265,000 in the early years of the tournament, steadily increasing each year for a prize fund of £1,250,000 in 2026. The winner currently receives £350,000.

== Television coverage ==
The matches have been broadcast on Thursday nights on Sky Sports since the tournament inception. Originally the league alternated with Premier League Snooker one week and Premier League Darts the next. From 2006, the snooker moved to late autumn – giving the Premier League darts a straight weekly run in the spring.

American sports channel OLN aired the 2006 Premier League Darts season on a slight delay, in August 2006. In 2018, BBC America started airing Premier League Darts on Thursday nights. In 2020, BBC America started airing Premier League Darts on Sunday mornings.

German sports channel Sport1 broadcasts most matches live on TV and gives coverages of a selection of matches.

The PDC announced in December 2017 that the contract with Sky Television for coverage of the Premier League had been extended to 2025.

== Finals ==
Year	Final					Tournament				
Year	Champion	Score	Runner-up	Best of	Venue	Prize Fund	Sponsors	Players	Venues	League winner
2005	Phil Taylor (101.01)	16–4	Colin Lloyd (97.20)	31 legs	G-Mex, Manchester	£150,000	888.com	7	11	Phil Taylor
2006	Phil Taylor (101.41)	16–6	Roland Scholten (92.01)	31 legs	Plymouth Pavilions, Plymouth	£167,500	Holsten	7	11	Phil Taylor
2007	Phil Taylor (99.20)	16–6	Terry Jenkins (90.81)	31 legs	The Brighton Centre, Brighton	£265,000	Holsten	8	15	Phil Taylor
2008	Phil Taylor (108.36)	16–8	James Wade (100.14)	31 legs	Cardiff International Arena, Cardiff	£340,000	Whyte & Mackay	8	15	Phil Taylor
2009	James Wade (90.38)	13–8	Mervyn King (85.83)	25 legs	Wembley Arena, London	£405,000	Whyte & Mackay	8	15	Phil Taylor
2010	Phil Taylor (111.67)	10–8	James Wade (100.08)	19 legs	Wembley Arena, London	£410,000	Whyte & Mackay	8	15	Phil Taylor
2011	Gary Anderson (94.67)	10–4	Adrian Lewis (85.75)	19 legs	Wembley Arena, London	£410,000	888.com	8	15	Phil Taylor
2012	Phil Taylor (97.08)	10–7	Simon Whitlock (95.32)	19 legs	The O_{2} Arena, London	£450,000	McCoy's	8	15	Phil Taylor
2013	Michael van Gerwen (103.29)	10–8	Phil Taylor (104.10)	19 legs	The O_{2} Arena, London	£520,000	McCoy's	10	15	Michael van Gerwen
2014	Raymond van Barneveld (101.93)	10–6	Michael van Gerwen (102.98)	19 legs	The O_{2} Arena, London	£550,000	Betway	10	16	Michael van Gerwen
2015	Gary Anderson (104.85)	11–7	Michael van Gerwen (105.81)	21 legs	The O_{2} Arena, London	£700,000	Betway	10	16	Michael van Gerwen
2016	Michael van Gerwen (104.68)	11–3	Phil Taylor (98.84)	21 legs	The O_{2} Arena, London	£725,000	Betway	10	16	Michael van Gerwen
2017	Michael van Gerwen (104.76)	11–10	Peter Wright (101.06)	21 legs	The O_{2} Arena, London	£825,000	Betway	10	16	Michael van Gerwen
2018	Michael van Gerwen (112.37)	11–4	Michael Smith (97.01)	21 legs	The O_{2} Arena, London	£825,000	Unibet	10	15 (Note: A scheduled night at Westpoint Exeter was cancelled due to Storm Emma. An extra round was held at Rotterdam Ahoy to compensate.)	Michael van Gerwen
2019	Michael van Gerwen (103.36)	11–5	Rob Cross (100.98)	21 legs	The O_{2} Arena, London	£825,000	Unibet	9 (Note: 9 players played regularly, with 9 others serving as 'contenders' for each of the first 9 nights.)	16	Michael van Gerwen
2020	Glen Durrant (91.84)	11–8	Nathan Aspinall (92.15)	21 legs	Coventry Arena, Coventry (Note: Final planned in the O_{2} Arena in London, but moved to Coventry due to the COVID-19 pandemic.)	£825,000	Unibet	9	8 (Note: Eleven scheduled nights at ten venues were cancelled due to the COVID-19 pandemic. Rounds were held at Arena MK behind closed doors to compensate.)	Glen Durrant
2021	Jonny Clayton (100.18)	11–5	José de Sousa (100.53)	21 legs	Arena MK, Milton Keynes	£855,000	Unibet	10	1 (Note: Sixteen scheduled nights at sixteen venues were cancelled due to the COVID-19 pandemic. Rounds were held at Arena MK behind closed doors to compensate.)	Michael van Gerwen
2022	Michael van Gerwen (99.10)	11–10	Joe Cullen (99.36)	21 legs	Mercedes-Benz Arena, Berlin	£1,000,000	Cazoo	8	17	Jonny Clayton
2023	Michael van Gerwen (105.43)	11–5	Gerwyn Price (99.50)	21 legs	The O_{2} Arena, London	£1,000,000	Cazoo	8	17	Gerwyn Price
2024	Luke Littler (105.60)	11–7	Luke Humphries (102.47)	21 legs	The O_{2} Arena, London	£1,000,000	BetMGM	8	17	Luke Littler
2025	Luke Humphries (97.86)	11–8	Luke Littler (100.29)	21 legs	The O_{2} Arena, London	£1,000,000	BetMGM	8	17	Luke Littler
2026	Luke Littler (111.67)	11–10	Luke Humphries (105.60)	21 legs	The O_{2} Arena, London	£1,250,000	BetMGM	8	17	Luke Littler

== Records and statistics ==
As of 28 May 2026.

=== Total finalist appearances ===
Rank	Player	Won	Runner-up	Finals	Appearances
1	**Michael van Gerwen**	7	2	9	14
2	Phil Taylor	6	2	8	13
3	**Luke Littler**	2	1	3	3
4	**Gary Anderson**	2	0	2	11
5	**Luke Humphries**	1	2	3	3
5	**James Wade**	1	2	3	12
7	**Raymond van Barneveld**	1	0	1	14
7	Glen Durrant	1	0	1	2
7	**Jonny Clayton**	1	0	1	4
10	Colin Lloyd	0	1	1	3
10	Roland Scholten	0	1	1	3
10	Terry Jenkins	0	1	1	5
10	**Mervyn King**	0	1	1	2
10	**Adrian Lewis**	0	1	1	10
10	**Simon Whitlock**	0	1	1	6
10	**Peter Wright**	0	1	1	9
10	**Michael Smith**	0	1	1	5
10	**Rob Cross**	0	1	1	4
10	**Nathan Aspinall**	0	1	1	3
10	**José de Sousa**	0	1	1	1
10	**Joe Cullen**	0	1	1	1
10	**Gerwyn Price**	0	1	1	8

- Active players are shown in **bold**
- Only players who reached the final are included
- In the event of identical records, players are sorted by date first achieved

=== Champions by country ===
Country	Players	Total	First title	Last title
England	5	11	2005	2026
Netherlands	2	8	2013	2023
Scotland	1	2	2011	2015
Wales	1	1	2021	2021

=== Nine-dart finishes ===
Twenty-one nine-dart finishes have been thrown in the Premier League. The first one was in 2006, and the most recent one was in 2026.

Player	Year (+ Week)	Location	Method	Opponent	Result
Raymond van Barneveld	2006, Week 5	Bournemouth	3 x T20; 3 x T20; T20, T19, D12	Peter Manley	8–3
Raymond van Barneveld	2010, Week 12	Aberdeen	3 x T20; 3 x T20; T20, T19, D12	Terry Jenkins	8–6
Phil Taylor	2010, Final	London	T20, 2 x T19; 3 x T20; T20, T17, D18	James Wade	10–8
Phil Taylor	2010, Final	London	3 x T20; 3 x T20; T20, T19, D12	James Wade	10–8
Phil Taylor	2012, Week 2	Aberdeen	3 x T20; T20, 2 x T19; T20, T17, D18	Kevin Painter	8–5
Simon Whitlock	2012, Semi-Final	London	3 x T20; 3 x T20; T20, T15, D18	Andy Hamilton	8–6
Adrian Lewis	2016, Week 11	Belfast	3 x T20; 2 x T20, T19; 2 x T20, D12	James Wade	7–5
Adrian Lewis	2017, Week 11	Liverpool	3 x T20; 3 x T20; T20, T19, D12	Raymond van Barneveld	7–4
Michael Smith	2020, Week 4	Dublin	3 x T20; 3 x T20; T20, T19, D12	Daryl Gurney	7–5
Peter Wright	2020, Night 11	Milton Keynes	3 x T20; 3 x T20; T20, T19, D12	Daryl Gurney	6–8
Jonny Clayton	2021, Night 3	Milton Keynes	3 x T20; 3 x T20; T20, T19, D12	José de Sousa	7–3
José de Sousa	2021, Night 4	Milton Keynes	3 x T20; 3 x T20; T20, T19, D12	Nathan Aspinall	6–6
Gerwyn Price	2022, Night 3	Belfast	2 x T20, T19; 3 x T20; 2 x T20, D12	Michael van Gerwen	6–5
Gerwyn Price	2022, Night 3	Belfast	3 x T20; 3 x T20; T19, T20, D12	James Wade	6–4
Gerwyn Price	2024, Night 10	Manchester	3 x T20; 3 x T20; T19, T20, D12	Michael Smith	6–3
Luke Littler	2024, Final	London	3 x T20, 3 x T20; T20, T19, D12	Luke Humphries	11–7
Luke Humphries	2025, Night 5	Brighton	3 x T20, 3 x T20; T20, T19, D12	Rob Cross	4–6
Rob Cross	2025, Night 5	Brighton	3 x T20; 3 x T20; T19, T16, D18	Nathan Aspinall	5–6
Luke Littler	2025, Night 7	Cardiff	3 x T20, 3 x T20; T20, T17, D15	Michael van Gerwen	6–4
Gerwyn Price	2025, Night 10	Manchester	3 x T20, 3 x T20; T19, T20, D12	Luke Littler	3–6
Gerwyn Price	2025, Night 15	Aberdeen	3 x T20, 3 x T20; T19, T20, D12	Stephen Bunting	4–6
Josh Rock	2026, Night 4	Belfast	3 x T20, 3 x T20; T20, T19, D12	Gian van Veen	2–6

=== Tournament records ===
- Most titles: 7 – Michael van Gerwen
- Most tournament appearances: 14 – Raymond van Barneveld
- Most matches played: 211 – Raymond van Barneveld
- Longest unbeaten run: 44 matches – Phil Taylor (2005–2008)
- Biggest victories (league stage): 11–1 **Phil Taylor** v Wayne Mardle (2005), 11–1 **Phil Taylor** v Peter Manley (2005)
- Biggest victories (playoff stages): 16–4 **Phil Taylor** v Colin Lloyd (2005 final)
- Most 180s by one player in a single match: 12 – **Luke Littler** v Luke Humphries (2026 final)
- Most 100+ averages in a season: 20 – Luke Littler (2026)
- Highest match average: 123.40 – Michael van Gerwen (2016)
- Highest tournament average: 107.49 – Michael van Gerwen (2016)
- Highest group stage overall average: 107.95 – Phil Taylor (2012)
- Lowest group stage overall average: 86.36 – Glen Durrant (2021)
- Highest average in the final: 112.37 – Michael van Gerwen (2018)
- Most points in a single season: 45 - Luke Littler (2025)

==== Whitewashes ====
Year	Player	Legs	Player
2007	Terry Jenkins 87.32	0–8	**Colin Lloyd** 88.43
2008	**Phil Taylor** 96.97	8–0	Wayne Mardle 88.43
2012	**James Wade** 96.97	8–0	Simon Whitlock 80.79
2014	Phil Taylor 99.45	0–7	**Michael van Gerwen** 109.59
2015	James Wade 93.93	0–7	**Michael van Gerwen** 116.90
2016	Robert Thornton 75.68	0–7	**Dave Chisnall** 101.16
2016	Robert Thornton 88.38	0–7	**Phil Taylor** 102.15
2017	Adrian Lewis 94.53	0–7	**Michael van Gerwen** 110.75
2018	Raymond van Barneveld 96.58	0–7	**Michael Smith** 103.15
2019	Daryl Gurney 94.45	0–7	**James Wade** 109.59
2020	Jermaine Wattimena 81.24	0–7	**Gerwyn Price** 102.15
2021	Glen Durrant 84.42	0–7	**Dimitri Van den Bergh** 93.94
2022	**Michael van Gerwen** 99.10	6–0	Peter Wright 87.52
2023	Michael van Gerwen 100.36	0–6	**Chris Dobey** 101.33
2023	**Michael van Gerwen** 100.20	6–0	Nathan Aspinall 97.00
2025	**Luke Littler** 109.98	6–0	Stephen Bunting 102.15
2026	Jonny Clayton 90.04	0–6	**Stephen Bunting** 106.09
2026	Josh Rock 84.21	0–6	**Gerwyn Price** 103.66
2026	**Luke Humphries** 107.36	6–0	Stephen Bunting 92.46
2026	Jonny Clayton 93.07	0–6	**Luke Littler** 100.20

=== High averages ===
Ten highest Premier League one-match averages
Average	Player	Year (+ Round)	Opponent	Result
123.40	Michael van Gerwen	2016, Week 4	Michael Smith	7–1
119.50	Peter Wright	2017, Week 5	Adrian Lewis	7–2
118.43	Luke Humphries	2025, Week 10	Stephen Bunting	6–1
117.95	Michael van Gerwen	2016, Week 10	Robert Thornton	7–5
117.35	Phil Taylor	2012, Week 4	Simon Whitlock	8–4
116.90	Michael van Gerwen	2015, Week 12	James Wade	7–0
116.67	Michael van Gerwen	2016, Week 5	Peter Wright	7–2
116.10	Phil Taylor	2012, Week 13	James Wade	8–1
116.01	Phil Taylor	2009, Week 12	John Part	8–3
115.97	Gerwyn Price	2023, Week 11	Chris Dobey	6–2

Five highest tournament averages
Average	Player	Year
107.48	Michael van Gerwen	2016
106.73	Phil Taylor	2012
105.26	Michael van Gerwen	2015
104.68	Michael van Gerwen	2017
104.11	Michael van Gerwen	2018

== Appearances ==
Since the tournament made its debut in 2005, Phil Taylor made an appearance in every Premier League competition until his retirement following the 2018 PDC World Darts Championship. Raymond van Barneveld competed in every Premier League from 2006 to 2019. From 2005 until the 2010 tournament, the top six players in the PDC Order of Merit after the PDC World Darts Championship automatically qualified, with one wildcard (2005 and 2006) and two wildcards (2007–2010) chosen by either the PDC or Sky Sports. From the 2011 tournament, only the top four in the PDC Order of Merit automatically qualified, with four wildcards (2011 and 2012) chosen by both the PDC and Sky Sports. In 2013, the tournament grew from eight players to ten, with the top four players in the PDC Order of Merit automatically qualifying and six other players chosen as Wildcards on the basis of their performance in the past year or in earlier editions of the Premier League. In 2022, the tournament shrank back down to eight.

In 2024, both Luke Humphries and Luke Littler have made their debuts, with Littler, aged 17 years and 11 days when the 2024 campaign began, the youngest ever competitor in the Premier League. Littler would also become the youngest player to win the Premier League, aged 17 years and 123 days.

=== Premier League players and performance ===
Player	#	05	06	07	08	09	10	11	12	13	14	15	16	17	18	19	20	21	22	23	24	25	26
Phil Taylor	13	W	W	W	W	SF	W	SF	W	RU	SF	5	RU	SF	×								
Colin Lloyd	3	RU	SF	5	×																		
Peter Manley	4	SF	6	6	6	×																	
Roland Scholten	3	SF	RU	8	×																		
Mark Dudbridge	1	5	×																				
John Part	3	6	×		8	6	×																
Wayne Mardle	4	7	7	×	5	WD	×																
Raymond van Barneveld	14	×	SF	SF	SF	SF	6	SF	5	SF	W	SF	7	6	6	9	×						
Ronnie Baxter	2	×	5	×			5	×															
Terry Jenkins	5	×		RU	7	5	8	7	×														
Dennis Priestley	1	×		SF	×	C	×																
Adrian Lewis	10	×		7	SF	C	7	RU	6	8	6	6	SF	8	×								
James Wade	12	×			RU	W	RU	5	SF	SF	×	7	6	7	×	SF	×	6	SF	×			
Mervyn King	2	×				RU	SF	×															
Jelle Klaasen	2	×				7	×							9	×								
Simon Whitlock	6	×					SF	6	RU	6	10	×			8	×							
Gary Anderson	11	×				C	×	W	8	10	SF	W	SF	SF	SF	WD	SF	8	8	×			
Mark Webster	1	×				C	×	8	×														
Andy Hamilton	2	×							SF	7	×												
Kevin Painter	1	×							7	×													
Michael van Gerwen	14	×								W	RU	RU	W	W	W	W	6	SF	W	W	SF	5	6
Robert Thornton	3	×				C	×			5	8	×	8	×									
Wes Newton	2	×								9	9	×											
Peter Wright	11	×									5	9	5	RU	7	8	SF	7	5	8	8	×	
Dave Chisnall	4	×									7	SF	9	5	×								
Stephen Bunting	3	×										8	×				C	×				8	5
Kim Huybrechts	2	×										10	×	10	×								
Michael Smith	7	×											10	×	RU	7	7	×	6	SF	SF	×	
Rob Cross	6	×													SF	RU	9	9	×		6	7	×
Daryl Gurney	3	×													5	SF	8	×					
Mensur Suljović	2	×													9	6	×						
Gerwyn Price	8	×													10	5	5	WD	7	RU	7	SF	SF
Nathan Aspinall	5	×														C	RU	SF	×	5	5	SF	×
Glen Durrant	2	×														C	W	10	×				
Dimitri Van den Bergh	2	×														C	×	5	×	6	×		
Jonny Clayton	4	×															C	W	SF	SF	×		SF
José de Sousa	1	×																RU	×				
Joe Cullen	1	×																	RU	×			
Chris Dobey	2	×														C	C	×		7	×	6	×
Luke Humphries	3	×														C	C	×			RU	W	RU
Luke Littler	3	×																			W	RU	W
Gian van Veen	1	×																					7
Josh Rock	1	×																					8

Table Legend
W	Won in playoffs	RU	Runner-up	SF	Lost in the semi-finals	#	Place in table, not qualified for playoffs		
#	Place in table, relegated	WD	Withdrew before tournament	WD	Withdrew during tournament	C	Challenger	×	Did not play

When Gary Anderson withdrew from the 2019 season just before it began, Chris Dobey, Glen Durrant, Steve Lennon, Luke Humphries, John Henderson, Nathan Aspinall, Max Hopp, Dimitri Van den Bergh and Jeffrey de Zwaan were named as "contenders" to play in Anderson's place each of the first eight weeks. This format was reused for the 2020 season, with nine regular players and nine challengers; Henderson, Fallon Sherrock, Jonny Clayton, William O'Connor, Humphries, Bunting, Dobey, de Zwaan and Jermaine Wattimena were the challengers.
