= Roland Scholten =

Dutch darts player (born 1965)

Personal information
- Nicknames: "The Tripod" "The Flying Dutchman"
- Born: 11 January 1965 (age 61) The Hague, Netherlands

Sport
- Sport: Darts
- Playing since: 1983
- Darts: 21g Datadart Signature
- Laterality: Right-handed
- Walk-on music: "Chelsea Dagger" by The Fratellis

Organisation (see split in darts)
- BDO: 1986–1999
- PDC: 2000–2013

WDF major events – best performances
- World Championship: Semi-final: 1998
- World Masters: Semi-final: 1996
- World Trophy: Last 16: 2007
- Int. Darts League: Semi-final: 2006
- Finder Masters: Last 16 Group: 2002

PDC premier events – best performances
- World Championship: Quarter-final: 2001, 2003
- World Matchplay: Semi-final: 2006
- World Grand Prix: Runner-up: 2001
- UK Open: Winner (1): 2004
- Grand Slam: Last 16: 2007
- European Championship: Last 32: 2008, 2009
- Premier League: Runner-up: 2006
- Championship League: Initial groups, 8th, 2008
- Desert Classic: Semi-final: 2002, 2008
- US Open/WSoD: Quarter-final: 2007

WSDT major events – best performances
- World Championship: Last 24: 2022
- World Masters: Last 20: 2022

Other tournament wins
- Years
British Open	1996
Eastbourne Pro	2003, 2004
Ireland Open Autumn Classic	2001
North Holland Open	1996
Open Holland	2002
PDC Eastbourne Open	2004
PDC World Pairs	1997
PDC World West European Qualifying	2010
Spring Cup	1998
Happy vogelpikkers cup	1994
Sunparks Masters	2003
Swedish Open	1996
Thialf Darts Trophy	2007

Other achievements
- 9-dart finish Golden Harvest North American Cup 2003

Roland Scholten (born 11 January 1965) is a Dutch former professional darts player who played in events of the Professional Darts Corporation (PDC) and British Darts Organisation (BDO). Nicknamed the Tripod and the Flying Dutchman, Scholten turned full-time professional in 2001 having previously worked as a publican.

== BDO career ==
Scholten was runner-up in the 1992 Austrian Open, losing to Rod Harrington. He then won the 1993 WDF World Cup, beating Denmark's Troels Rusel in the final. Scholten made his BDO World Championship debut in 1994 where he beat Sean Palfrey in the first round and became the only seed to progress to the second round where he lost to Ronnie Sharp. He followed up with a quarter final showing in the 1994 Winmau World Masters, beating Stefan Eeckelaert and Derek Hampton before losing to Steve Beaton. He then suffered a first round exit in the 1995 World Championship, losing to Colin Monk and reached the second round of the 1995 World Masters, again beating Palfrey in the first round but lost to fellow Dutchman Raymond van Barneveld.

In the 1996 World Championship, Scholten beat Mark Salmon 3–0 in the first round but lost in the second round to then-defending champion Richie Burnett. Scholten won three Open tournaments in 1996, winning the North Holland Open, the Swedish Open and the prestigious British Open. He then reached the semi-finals on the 1996 World Masters, losing to the eventual winner Monk. Scholten then reached the quarter-finals of the 1997 World Championship, beating former finalist Mike Gregory and Bobby George before losing to Mervyn King. He reached the final of the England Open and the Swedish Open and his British Open defence ended in the quarter-finals. Scholten, with partner van Barneveld won the PDC World Pairs Championship at Bognor Regis in 1997, beating the pairing of Burnett and Harrington in the final.

In the 1998 World Championship, Scholten reached the semi-finals, beating fellow Dutchman Co Stompé, American Roger Carter and then Sean Palfrey once more before losing to Richie Burnett. In the 1999 World Championship, Scholten lost in the quarter-final stage to Ronnie Baxter.

== PDC career ==
Shortly after the 1999 Embassy World Championship, Scholten attempted to leave the BDO and switch to the PDC although did not receive validation from the BDO so had to skip the 2000 World Darts Championship. He reached the final of the 2000 Antwerp Open, losing to Jamie Harvey. He made his PDC major debut in the 2000 World Matchplay, losing in the first round to Rod Harrington. He also played in the 2000 World Grand Prix, also losing in the first round to Richie Burnett.

He made his PDC World Championship debut in 2001, reaching the quarter-finals, progressing with 3–0 wins over Shayne Burgess and Cliff Lazarenko before losing to Harrington 4–2. He then reached the second round of the 2001 World Matchplay and then reached his first major final in the 2001 World Grand Prix, beating Rod Harrington, Mick Manning, John Part and John Lowe before losing to Alan Warriner.

Scholten reached the second round of the 2002 World Championship, losing to Dave Askew. He then won his first PDC event in the 2002 Open Holland and reached the semi-finals of the Las Vegas Desert Classic, losing to Baxter. In the 2002 World Matchplay he lost again in the second round, losing to Colin Lloyd. He then reached the quarter-finals of the World Grand Prix, losing 4–0 to Andy Jenkins. A quarter final place in the 2003 World Championship followed as well as a semi final place in the 2003 UK Open, a quarter final showing in the 2003 Desert Classic and reaching the semi-finals of the World Grand Prix. He also won the 2003 Eastbourne Pro and the Primus Masters but suffered a first round exit in the World Matchplay.

Scholten lost in the third round of the 2004 World Championship, losing his only match to Lionel Sams. After retaining his Eastbourne Open title, Scholten won his first major title the Budweiser UK Open in June. He beat Mark Dudbridge, Henry O'Neill, Denis Ovens, Alan Warriner and Steve Beaton, before beating John Part in the final.

Scholten reached the semi-finals of the 2005 Premier League, and went into the match as a big underdog against Phil Taylor. However, Scholten upset the form book for most of the best-of-25 legs match, as he led 4–1, 5–2, 6–3, 7–4 and 11–7, only for Taylor to produce a remarkable comeback by winning 6 consecutive legs to win the match 13–11.

In the 2006 Premier League, Scholten again reached the semi-finals, and again went into the match as a big underdog, this time against Raymond van Barneveld. Scholten again upset the form book, and this time completed the job, as he defeated van Barneveld 11–3, to advance into the final. However, Scholten was unable to repeat the performance in the final, as Phil Taylor defeated him, 16–6.

Scholten reached the semi-finals of the 2006 World Matchplay, losing in a tie-break to James Wade, having had one dart at double top to win the match.

Scholten, the number 4 seed, defeated Ron Miller and Alex Roy in the 2007 PDC World Darts Championship, but lost in the third round to Colin Osborne 4–2.

Scholten finished in last place in the 2007 Premier League, despite twice taking Phil Taylor to a 7–7 draw. At the 2007 World Matchplay, Scholten and Taylor met in the quarter-finals, with Taylor winning by a crushing 16–1 scoreline.

Scholten suffered with neck and shoulder problems from October 2008 which severely affected his performances. He suffered an early exit in the Championship of Darts and the European Championship, averaging a very poor 51.52 in losing to Mensur Suljović at the 2008 European Championship. He then lost in the first round of the 2009 PDC World Championship, losing to Spain's Carlos Rodriguez which dropped him outside the world's top 16. In 2009, he had his shoulder operated on and took a break from darts. Scholten lost in the first round of the 2010 PDC World Championship 3–2 against Steve Hine.

He worked for a time as an expert for the German TV Station, Sport1, starting with the 2010 World Matchplay.

Scholten beat Jamie Caven 3–1 in the first round of the 2012 World Championship, but was whitewashed in the next round 0–4 by Wayne Jones. His best result in the rest of 2012 came in February at the second UK Open Qualifier where he beat the likes of Ted Hankey and Brendan Dolan to reach the quarter-finals, but he was beaten 1–6 by Dave Chisnall. In the UK Open, he ran 15 times world champion Phil Taylor very close in the last 64, but ultimately lost 7–9. Scholten lost in the quarter-finals of the 2013 World Championship Qualifier to Terry Temple and was ranked world number 47 after the tournament had been completed.

Scholten was beaten 5–4 by Conan Whitehead in the first round of the 2013 UK Open. He had one of his most disappointing years in darts as he played the full PDC schedule but did not advance past the last 32 in any event.

== World Championship results ==
=== BDO ===
- 1994: Second round (lost to Ronnie Sharp 1–3) (sets)
- 1995: First round (lost to Colin Monk 1–3)
- 1996: Second round (lost to Richie Burnett 1–3)
- 1997: Quarter-finals (lost to Mervyn King 2–4)
- 1998: Semi-finals (lost to Richie Burnett 1–5)
- 1999: Quarter-finals (lost to Ronnie Baxter 3–5)

=== PDC ===
- 2001: Quarter-finals (lost to Rod Harrington 2–4)
- 2002: Second round (lost to Dave Askew 3–6)
- 2003: Quarter-finals (lost to Alan Warriner 2–5)
- 2004: Third round (lost to Lionel Sams 2–4)
- 2005: Fourth round (lost to Denis Ovens 2–4)
- 2006: Third round (lost to Adrian Lewis 3–4)
- 2007: Third round (lost to Colin Osborne 2–4)
- 2008: Third round (lost to Wayne Mardle 3–4)
- 2009: First round (lost to Carlos Rodriguez 2–3)
- 2010: First round (lost to Steve Hine 2–3)
- 2011: First round (lost to Ronnie Baxter 0–3)
- 2012: Second round (lost to Wayne Jones 0–4)

=== WSDT ===
- 2022: First round (lost to Terry Jenkins 0–3)
- 2023: First round (lost to Robert Thornton 0–3)

== Career finals ==
=== PDC major finals: 3 (1 title) ===
Legend
World Grand Prix (0–1)
Premier League (0–1)
UK Open (1–0)

Outcome	No.	Year	Championship	Opponent in the final	Score (Note: (l) = score in legs, (s) = score in sets.)
Runner-up	1.	2001	World Grand Prix	Alan Warriner-Little	2–8 (s)
Winner	1.	2004	UK Open	John Part	11–6 (l)
Runner-up	2.	2006	Premier League	Phil Taylor	6–16 (l)

=== WDF major finals: 2 (1 title, 1 runner-up) ===
Legend
World Cup (1–0)
Europe Cup (0–1)

Outcome	No.	Year	Championship	Opponent in the final	Score
Winner	1.	1993	World Cup Singles	(Denmark) Troels Rusel	4–2 (s)
Runner-up	1.	1996	Europe Cup Singles	(England) Martin Adams	3–4 (s)

=== PDC team finals: 1 (1 title) ===
Outcome	No.	Year	Championship	Teammate	Opponents in the final	Score
Winner	1.	1997	World Pairs	Raymond van Barneveld	Richie Burnett; Rod Harrington	18–15 (l)

== Performance timeline ==
BDO

Tournament	1986	1987	1988	1989	1990	1991	1992	1993	1994	1995	1996	1997	1998	1999	2000	2001	2002	2003	2004	2005	2006	2007
BDO World Championship	DNQ								2R	1R	2R	QF	SF	QF	No longer a BDO Member							
Winmau World Masters	1R	DNQ						2R	QF	4R	SF	2R	2R	No longer a BDO Member								
European Masters	Not held									2R	Not held											
Zuiderduin Masters	Not held														DNP		RR	DNP			NH	DNP
World Darts Trophy	Not held																DNP					2R
International Darts League	Not held																	DNP			SF	RR

PDC

Tournament	2000	2001	2002	2003	2004	2005	2006	2007	2008	2009	2010	2011	2012	2013
PDC World Championship	DNQ	QF	2R	QF	3R	4R	3R	3R	3R	1R	1R	1R	2R	DNQ
Premier League Darts	Not held					SF	F	8th	DNP					
UK Open	Not held			SF	W	SF	5R	4R	3R	4R	4R	3R	3R	1R
Las Vegas Desert Classic	Not held		SF	QF	1R	QF	2R	QF	SF	DNQ	Not held			
World Matchplay	1R	2R	2R	1R	2R	2R	SF	QF	1R	DNQ				
World Grand Prix	1R	F	QF	SF	2R	1R	QF	2R	1R	DNQ				
Grand Slam of Darts	Not held							2R	DNQ					
European Championship	Not held								1R	1R	DNQ			
Masters of Darts	Not held					SF	NH	RR	Not held					

Performance Table Legend
W	Won the tournament	F	Finalist	SF	Semifinalist	QF	Quarterfinalist	#R; RR; Prel.	Lost in # round Round-robin; Preliminary round	DQ	Disqualified
DNQ	Did not qualify	DNP	Did not participate	WD	Withdrew	NH	Tournament not held	#R; RR; Prel.	Lost in # round Round-robin; Preliminary round	NYF	Not yet founded

== High averages ==
Roland Scholten televised high averages
Average	Date	Opponent	Tournament	Stage	Score
110.21	18 November 2007	(Netherlands) Michael van Gerwen	2007 Grand Slam of Darts	Group stage	5–1 (l)
