= 2005 World Matchplay =

2005 Stan James World Matchplay

Tournament information
- Dates: 24–30 July 2005
- Venue: Winter Gardens
- Location: Blackpool, England
- Organisation(s): Professional Darts Corporation (PDC)
- Format: Legs
- Prize fund: £120,000
- Winner's share: £25,000
- High checkout: 170 Colin Lloyd

Champion(s)
- Colin Lloyd (ENG)

The 2005 Stan James World Matchplay was the 12th staging of the major darts tournament by the Professional Darts Corporation (PDC). It was held at the Winter Gardens, Blackpool between 24th – 30th July 2005.

Colin Lloyd, the PDC world number one since April 2005, secured his second major televised title adding to his World Grand Prix title from the previous October. He beat John Part in the final, Part had earlier knocked out World Champion Phil Taylor in the quarter-finals which ended Taylor's successful run at Blackpool. Taylor had won the Matchplay title for five successive years. Taylor had also won the first four major titles of 2005 and was just two tournaments short of an incredible Grand Slam of televised PDC titles.

Lloyd had to overcome a tough quarter-final against rising star Adrian Lewis. Lewis, a qualifier and protégé of Phil Taylor, led 13–11 before Lloyd won five successive legs to clinch a place in the semi-final where he also came from behind from 3–7 to beat Ronnie Baxter 17–11.

The final saw Lloyd hit 15 maximum 180s and led all the way through the match although Part did manage to peg him back from 0–3 to 4–5 in the early stages. Lloyd stretched his lead to 12–6 and then took five out of six legs to go with one of victory. Although Part took three legs in a row, he was too far behind to stage a comeback and Lloyd checked out the highest possible finish of 170 to take the title in style.

== Prize money ==
Position (no. of players)		Prize money (Total: £120,000)
Winner	(1)	£25,000
Runner-Up	(1)	£12,500
Semi-finalists	(2)	£7,250
Quarter-finalists	(4)	£5,000
Second round	(8)	£2,500
First round	(16)	£1,750

== Seeds ==
The event featured sixteen seeds.

1. (England) Colin Lloyd
2. (England) Phil Taylor
3. (England) Peter Manley
4. (Netherlands) Roland Scholten
5. (England) Ronnie Baxter
6. (England) Wayne Mardle
7. (Canada) John Part
8. (England) Kevin Painter
9. (England) Denis Ovens
10. (England) Andy Jenkins
11. (England) Mark Dudbridge
12. (England) Alan Warriner
13. (England) Dennis Smith
14. (England) Terry Jenkins
15. (England) Dennis Priestley
16. (England) Mark Walsh

== Draw ==
Players in bold denote match winners.

**First round** (best of 19 legs); 24–26 July
1	(England) **Colin Lloyd** 92.04	**10**
(England) Paul Williams 90.38	7
16	(England) **Mark Walsh** 91.26	**10**
(England) Mick Manning 84.88	4
8	(England) Kevin Painter 80.43	4
(England) **Adrian Lewis** 85.86	**10**
9	(England) **Denis Ovens** 87.18	**10**
(England) Steve Beaton 86.04	6
5	(England) **Ronnie Baxter** 93.18	**10**
(England) Colin Osborne 85.44	5
12	(England) Alan Warriner-Little 84.33	7
(England) **Dave Askew** 86.70	**10**
4	(Netherlands) **Roland Scholten** 92.44	**10**
(England) Matt Clark 95.13	7
13	(England) **Dennis Smith** 83.38	**10**
(England) Ian Whillis 83.53	7
2	(England) **Phil Taylor** 102.09	**10**
(Scotland) Jamie Harvey 87.52	4
15	(England) **Dennis Priestley** 86.46	**10**
(England) Alex Roy 84.13	3
7	(Canada) **John Part** 93.06	**10**
(Wales) Kelvin Painter 82.46	4
10	(England) **Andy Jenkins** 82.48	**10**
(England) Darren Webster 83.01	6
6	(England) **Wayne Mardle** 97.64	**10**
(England) Lionel Sams 78.67	2
11	(England) **Mark Dudbridge** 91.02	**10**
(England) Alan Caves 87.19	7
3	(England) **Peter Manley** 89.63	**10**
(England) Bob Anderson 95.67	8
14	(England) **Terry Jenkins** 84.03	**10**
(England) Keith Deller 84.14	8

**Second round** (best of 25 legs); 26–27 July
1	(England) **Colin Lloyd** 102.57	**13**
16	(England) Mark Walsh 93.48	4
(England) **Adrian Lewis** 95.58	**16**
9	(England) Denis Ovens 91.53	14
5	(England) **Ronnie Baxter** 90.00	**13**
(England) Dave Askew 80.94	6
4	(Netherlands) Roland Scholten 89.52	10
13	(England) **Dennis Smith** 87.90	**13**
2	(England) **Phil Taylor** 98.43	**15**
15	(England) Dennis Priestley 93.69	13
7	(Canada) **John Part** 94.02	**13**
10	(England) Andy Jenkins 91.86	8
6	(England) **Wayne Mardle** 93.99	**13**
11	(England) Mark Dudbridge 88.71	10
3	(England) **Peter Manley** 87.69	**13**
14	(England) Terry Jenkins 86.73	10

**Quarter-finals** (best of 31 legs); 28 July
1	(England) **Colin Lloyd** 95.88	**16**
(England) Adrian Lewis 95.55	13
5	(England) **Ronnie Baxter** 92.52	**16**
13	(England) Dennis Smith 90.96	10
2	(England) Phil Taylor 99.39	11
7	(Canada) **John Part** 97.05	**16**
6	(England) Wayne Mardle 92.70	14
3	(England) **Peter Manley** 89.16	**16**

**Semi-finals** (best of 33 legs); 29 July
1	(England) **Colin Lloyd** 90.78	**17**
5	(England) Ronnie Baxter 92.16	13
7	(Canada) **John Part** 89.22	**18**
3	(England) Peter Manley 89.40	16

**Final** (best of 35 legs); 30 July
1	(England) **Colin Lloyd** 97.89	**18**
7	(Canada) John Part 94.53	12
