= 2006 World Grand Prix (darts) =

2006 Sky Bet World Grand Prix

Tournament information
- Dates: 23–29 October 2006
- Venue: Citywest Hotel
- Location: Dublin, Ireland
- Organisation(s): Professional Darts Corporation (PDC)
- Format: Sets "double in, double out"
- Prize fund: £130,000
- Winner's share: £25,000
- High checkout: 160 Ronnie Baxter

Champion(s)
- Phil Taylor (ENG)

The 2006 Sky Bet World Grand Prix was the ninth staging of the World Grand Prix darts tournament, organised by the Professional Darts Corporation. It was held at the Citywest Hotel, Dublin, Ireland, from 23 to 29 October 2006.

The top 24 players in the PDC World Rankings were joined by four players from a field of 348 at the All Ireland Qualifiers and four players from a field of 127 at the PDPA Qualifiers. Phil Taylor won the event – his seventh Grand Prix title.

== How They Qualified ==
=== Automatic Qualifiers ===
The top 24 players in the PDC rankings secured their place at the 2006 World Grand Prix automatically. Colin Lloyd as world number one at the time of the cut-off date of 11 September took his place as top seed.

=== All Ireland Qualifiers ===
The Fairways Hotel in Dundalk played host to the All-Ireland qualifying event on 17 September. Out of a field of 348 players from Ireland, four qualified to play in the World Grand Prix. The top three ranked players - Jack McKenna, John MaGowan, John Elder, Tom Kirby, James Keogh and Mick McGowan all failed to reach the final stages. Three of the qualifiers will be making their Grand Prix debuts, with only Paul Watton having previously appeared.

Anto McCracken, Dublin
Garrett Gray, Dublin
Geoffrey Matthews, Ballymena
Paul Watton, Coleraine

=== PDPA Qualifiers ===
The Professional Dart Players Association (PDPA) qualifying event was held at the Newport Centre on 22 September. Out of a field of 127 players, four players qualified to complete the line up for the Grand Prix. Raymond van Barneveld, Steve Beaton, Alan Green and Andy Callaby were the successful players.

== Prize fund ==
Following the announcement in October 2006 of the extension of Skybet's sponsorship contract, the prize fund was increased to £130,000.

Position (num. of players)		Prize money (Total: £130,000)
Winner	(1)	£25,000
Runner-Up	(1)	£12,500
Semi-finalists	(2)	£8,250
Quarter-finalists	(4)	£6,000
Second round losers	(8)	£3,000
First round losers	(16)	£1,750

== Seeds ==
The event featured eight seeds.

1. (England) Colin Lloyd
2. (England) Phil Taylor
3. (England) Ronnie Baxter
4. (England) Wayne Mardle
5. (England) Peter Manley
6. (England) Dennis Priestley
7. (Netherlands) Roland Scholten
8. (England) Kevin Painter

== Results ==
Players in bold denote match winners.

**First round** (best of 3 sets); 23–24 October
1	(England) Colin Lloyd 92.89	1
(England) **Bob Anderson** 91.31	**2**
(Republic of Ireland) **Anto McCracken** 62.83	**2**
(England) Mark Walsh 64.65	1
8	(England) Kevin Painter 82.48	0
(England) **Andy Callaby** 79.67	**2**
(England) Andy Jenkins 81.60	1
(England) **Terry Jenkins** 83.91	**2**
5	(England) **Peter Manley** 84.65	**2**
(England) Chris Mason 65.95	0
(England) **Lionel Sams** 84.10	**2**
(Canada) John Part 81.33	1
4	(England) **Wayne Mardle** 91.98	**2**
(England) Denis Ovens 78.14	0
(Republic of Ireland) Garrett Gray 76.45	0
(England) **Andy Smith** 82.63	**2**
2	(England) **Phil Taylor** 82.57	**2**
(England) Wes Newton 86.18	0
(England) Alan Warriner-Little 75.60	1
(Netherlands) **Raymond van Barneveld** 85.88	**2**
7	(Netherlands) **Roland Scholten** 96.48	**2**
(England) Dave Askew 75.81	0
(England) Mark Dudbridge 80.92	0
(England) **Steve Beaton** 88.68	**2**
6	(England) **Dennis Priestley** 93.74	**2**
(Republic of Ireland) Geoffrey Matthews 72.49	0
(England) **Adrian Lewis** 90.56	**2**
(Wales) Barrie Bates 68.89	0
3	(England) **Ronnie Baxter** 84.98	**2**
(England) Alan Green 74.21	0
(Northern Ireland) Paul Watton 80.42	0
(England) **James Wade** 82.44	**2**

**Second round** (best of 5 sets); 25–26 October
(England) **Bob Anderson** 77.84	**3**
(Republic of Ireland) Anto McCracken 59.44	1
(England) Andy Callaby 79.52	2
(England) **Terry Jenkins** 83.81	**3**
5	(England) **Peter Manley** 80.58	**3**
(England) Lionel Sams 73.50	1
4	(England) Wayne Mardle 78.39	0
(England) **Andy Smith** 81.62	**3**
2	(England) **Phil Taylor** 89.82	**3**
(Netherlands) Raymond van Barneveld 94.23	1
7	(Netherlands) **Roland Scholten** 85.14	**3**
(England) Steve Beaton 81.97	1
6	(England) **Dennis Priestley** 92.54	**3**
(England) Adrian Lewis 88.60	2
3	(England) Ronnie Baxter 80.56	0
(England) **James Wade** 85.83	**3**

**Quarter-finals** (best of 7 sets); 27 October
(England) Bob Anderson 77.87	1
(England) **Terry Jenkins** 82.88	**4**
5	(England) **Peter Manley** 85.61	**4**
(England) Andy Smith 84.19	1
2	(England) **Phil Taylor** 88.26	**4**
7	(Netherlands) Roland Scholten 80.74	0
6	(England) **Dennis Priestley** 82.51	**4**
(England) James Wade 80.40	2

**Semi-finals** (best of 11 sets); 28 October
(England) **Terry Jenkins** 77.87	**6**
5	(England) Peter Manley 82.88	4
2	(England) **Phil Taylor** 95.39	**6**
6	(England) Dennis Priestley 87.66	3

**Final** (best of 13 sets); 29 October
(England) Terry Jenkins 82.51	4
2	(England) **Phil Taylor** 88.24	**7**
