= 2007 Premier League Darts =

Darts competition

2007 Holsten Premier League Darts

Tournament information
- Dates: 1 February–28 May 2007

Champion(s)
- Phil Taylor

The 2007 Holsten Premier League was a major darts tournament organised by the Professional Darts Corporation. The prize money for the 2007 event increased by almost £100,000 compared to 2006. The overall fund was £265,000 with the eventual winner taking home £75,000. The inclusion of an eighth player meant that the league expanded from 10 to 14 weeks.

Phil Taylor continued his dominance of this tournament by taking the title for the third year in a row. In fact, he remained unbeaten throughout this year's event – and extended his overall unbeaten run in the Premier League to 44 matches.

== Qualifiers ==
The PDC awarded places in the league to the top six players in their world rankings after the SkyBet World Grand Prix in October 2006.

Terry Jenkins' semi-final victory over Peter Manley in Dublin secured the last automatic place in the Premier League at the expense of Wayne Mardle.

The remaining two places were determined by wildcards. The first was awarded after the SkyBet World Grand Prix – the PDC gave this to Raymond van Barneveld. The second wildcard awarded by host broadcaster Sky Sports to Adrian Lewis.

Top six players in rankings at the end of the World Grand Prix and received automatic qualification were

1 Colin Lloyd 549
2 Phil Taylor 545
3 Dennis Priestley 446
4 Peter Manley 441
5 Roland Scholten 433
6 Terry Jenkins 430
Wildcard Raymond van Barneveld
Wildcard Adrian Lewis

The following top 10 players missed out on automatic qualification.

7 Wayne Mardle 427
8 Ronnie Baxter 424
9 Adrian Lewis 421 (Awarded Wildcard, January 2007)
10 Andy Jenkins 420

== Venues ==
The amount of venues was increased from 11 to 15 for the 2007 tournament, with many of the venues used now more larger arenas which would be mainstays of the Premier League for years to come.

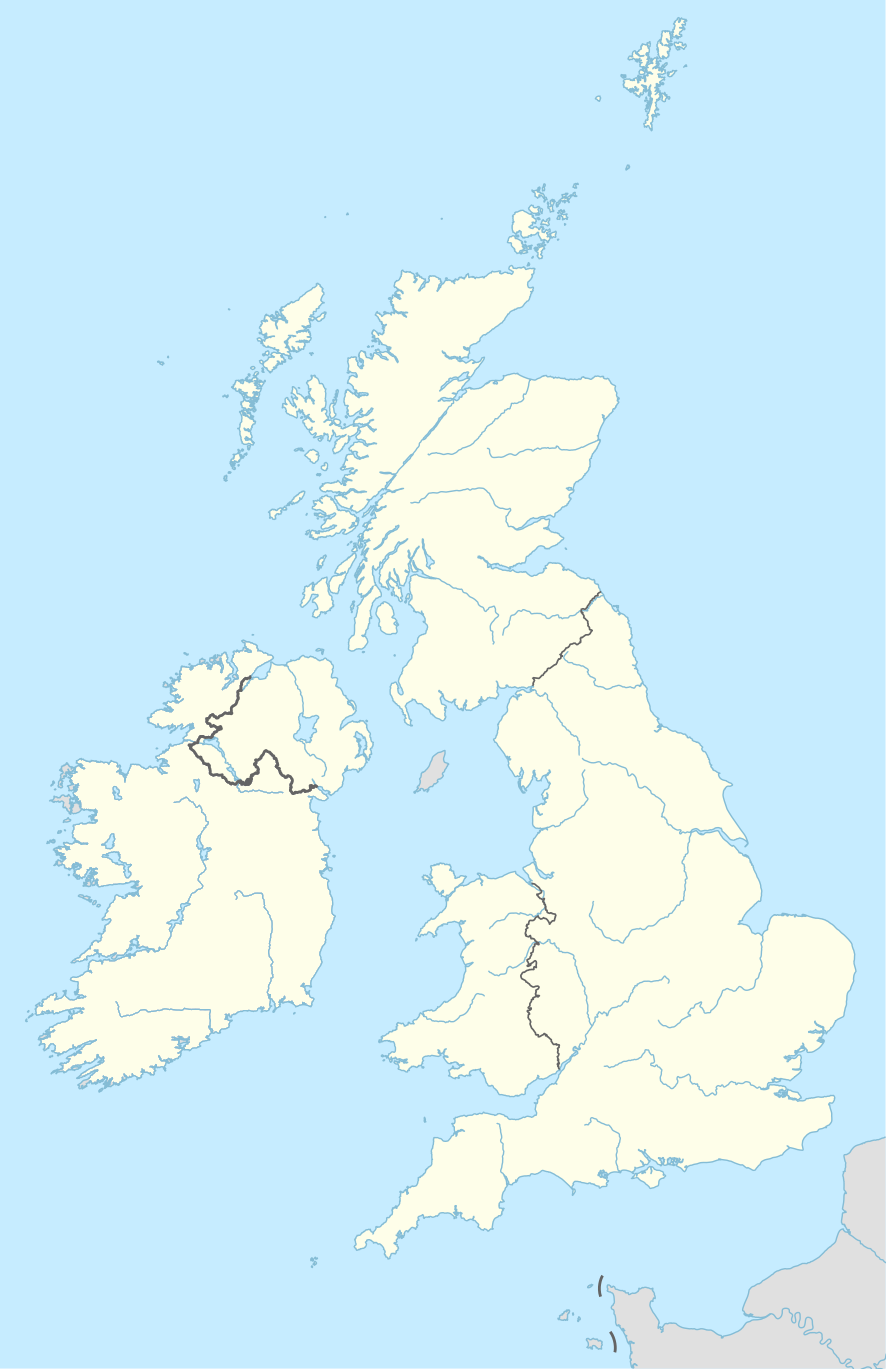
Locations of the 2007 Premier League venues in the United Kingdom.

== Prize money ==
| Stage | Prize money |
|---|---|
| Winner | £75,000 |
| Runner-up | £40,000 |
| Semi-finalists (x2) | £30,000 |
| 5th place | £22,500 |
| 6th place | £20,000 |
| 7th place | £17,500 |
| 8th place | £15,000 |
| High Checkout (per night) | £1,000 |
| Total | £265,000 |

== Results ==
=== League stage ===
==== 1 February – Week 1 ====
(England) Plymouth Pavilions, Plymouth

| Player | Legs | Player |
|---|---|---|
| Raymond van Barneveld (Netherlands); 97.65 | 8 – 5 | (England) Adrian Lewis; 97.02 |
| Dennis Priestley (England); 92.46 | 8 – 5 | (England) Terry Jenkins; 94.67 |
| Peter Manley (England); 84.68 | 8 – 6 | (England) Colin Lloyd; 86.84 |
| Phil Taylor (England); 94.48 | 7 – 7 | (Netherlands) Roland Scholten; 95.51 |
High Checkout: Terry Jenkins 157

==== 8 February – Week 2 ====
(England) Wolverhampton Civic Hall, Wolverhampton

| Player | Legs | Player |
|---|---|---|
| Colin Lloyd (England); 94.55 | 6 – 8 | (Netherlands) Raymond van Barneveld; 95.66 |
| Roland Scholten (Netherlands); 96.43 | 6 – 8 | (England) Terry Jenkins; 94.32 |
| Phil Taylor (England); 96.96 | 7 – 7 | (England) Dennis Priestley; 92.30 |
| Peter Manley (England); 80.73 | 4 – 8 | (England) Adrian Lewis; 88.36 |
High Checkout: Adrian Lewis 164

==== 15 February – Week 3 ====
(England) Nottingham Arena, Nottingham

| Player | Legs | Player |
|---|---|---|
| Terry Jenkins (England); 92.88 | 6 – 8 | (England) Phil Taylor; 92.35 |
| Raymond van Barneveld (Netherlands); 95.15 | 7 – 7 | (England) Peter Manley; 90.44 |
| Adrian Lewis (England); 97.60 | 8 – 5 | (England) Colin Lloyd; 86.84 |
| Dennis Priestley (England); 94.31 | 8 – 3 | (Netherlands) Roland Scholten; 91.04 |
High Checkout: Peter Manley 138

==== 22 February – Week 4 ====
(England) Metro Radio Arena, Newcastle upon Tyne

| Player | Legs | Player |
|---|---|---|
| Colin Lloyd (England); 98.89 | 8 – 5 | (Netherlands) Roland Scholten; 89.84 |
| Adrian Lewis (England); 82.22 | 1 – 8 | (England) Dennis Priestley; 88.28 |
| Peter Manley (England); 85.86 | 2 – 8 | (England) Phil Taylor; 100.67 |
| Terry Jenkins (England); 102.65 | 7 – 7 | (Netherlands) Raymond van Barneveld; 107.38 |
High Checkout: Raymond van Barneveld 170

==== 1 March – Week 5 ====
(England) Hallam FM Arena, Sheffield

| Player | Legs | Player |
|---|---|---|
| Adrian Lewis (England); 94.19 | 6 – 8 | (Netherlands) Roland Scholten; 94.24 |
| Dennis Priestley (England); 91.33 | 8 – 5 | (England) Colin Lloyd; 93.11 |
| Terry Jenkins (England); 93.00 | 8 – 5 | (England) Peter Manley; 88.88 |
| Raymond van Barneveld (Netherlands); 97.82 | 6 – 8 | (England) Phil Taylor; 102.24 |
High Checkout: Adrian Lewis 142

==== 8 March – Week 6 ====
(Scotland) AECC, Aberdeen

| Player | Legs | Player |
|---|---|---|
| Dennis Priestley (England); 97.70 | 6 – 8 | (England) Peter Manley; 92.70 |
| Phil Taylor (England); 105.58 | 8 – 2 | (England) Adrian Lewis; 94.72 |
| Roland Scholten (Netherlands); 94.94 | 1 – 8 | (Netherlands) Raymond van Barneveld; 104.12 |
| Colin Lloyd (England); 101.70 | 6 – 8 | (England) Terry Jenkins; 100.98 |
High Checkout: Terry Jenkins 141

==== 15 March – Week 7 ====
(England) Winter Gardens, Blackpool

| Player | Legs | Player |
|---|---|---|
| Adrian Lewis (England); 87.76 | 1 – 8 | (England) Terry Jenkins; 98.67 |
| Roland Scholten (Netherlands); 97.17 | 8 – 2 | (England) Peter Manley; 88.44 |
| Raymond van Barneveld (Netherlands); 86.28 | 4 – 8 | (England) Dennis Priestley; 81.33 |
| Phil Taylor (England); 101.26 | 8 – 1 | (England) Colin Lloyd; 93.07 |
High Checkout: Phil Taylor 170

==== 22 March – Week 8 ====
(Scotland) SECC, Glasgow

| Player | Legs | Player |
|---|---|---|
| Terry Jenkins (England); 89.28 | 7 – 7 | (England) Dennis Priestley; 92.79 |
| Adrian Lewis (England); 89.24 | 3 – 8 | (Netherlands) Raymond van Barneveld; 98.59 |
| Colin Lloyd (England); 91.72 | 8 – 2 | (England) Peter Manley; 88.06 |
| Roland Scholten (Netherlands); 99.61 | 7 – 7 | (England) Phil Taylor; 99.42 |
High Checkout: Raymond van Barneveld 156

==== 29 March – Week 9 ====
(England) Rivermead Centre, Reading

| Player | Legs | Player |
|---|---|---|
| Raymond van Barneveld (Netherlands); 95.45 | 6 – 8 | (England) Colin Lloyd; 92.73 |
| Terry Jenkins (England); 95.46 | 8 – 6 | (Netherlands) Roland Scholten; 95.97 |
| Dennis Priestley (England); 93.96 | 2 – 8 | (England) Phil Taylor; 102.17 |
| Adrian Lewis (England); 82.87 | 4 – 8 | (England) Peter Manley; 84.41 |
High Checkout: Phil Taylor 121

==== 5 April – Week 10 ====
(England) Bournemouth International Centre, Bournemouth

| Player | Legs | Player |
|---|---|---|
| Peter Manley (England); 86.31 | 7 – 7 | (Netherlands) Raymond van Barneveld; 86.65 |
| Colin Lloyd (England); 93.61 | 5 – 8 | (England) Adrian Lewis; 100.08 |
| Roland Scholten (Netherlands); 95.97 | 7 – 7 | (England) Dennis Priestley; 99.50 |
| Phil Taylor (England); 107.27 | 8 – 1 | (England) Terry Jenkins; 91.44 |
High Checkout: Adrian Lewis 164

==== 12 April – Week 11 ====
(Wales) Cardiff International Arena, Cardiff

| Player | Legs | Player |
|---|---|---|
| Roland Scholten (Netherlands); 99.28 | 4 – 8 | (England) Colin Lloyd; 103.18 |
| Dennis Priestley (England); 95.61 | 6 – 8 | (England) Adrian Lewis; 101.67 |
| Phil Taylor (England); 99.23 | 8 – 1 | (England) Peter Manley; 96.73 |
| Raymond van Barneveld (Netherlands); 92.53 | 8 – 5 | (England) Terry Jenkins; 93.00 |
High Checkout: Roland Scholten 121

==== 19 April – Week 12 ====
(England) King George's Hall, Blackburn

| Player | Legs | Player |
|---|---|---|
| Terry Jenkins (England); 89.96 | 8 – 5 | (England) Adrian Lewis; 92.21 |
| Peter Manley (England); 91.93 | 4 – 8 | (Netherlands) Roland Scholten; 93.68 |
| Dennis Priestley (England); 99.51 | 4 – 8 | (Netherlands) Raymond van Barneveld; 104.32 |
| Colin Lloyd (England); 95.12 | 3 – 8 | (England) Phil Taylor; 104.42 |
High Checkout: Phil Taylor 126

==== 26 April – Week 13 ====
(England) Alexandra Palace, London

| Player | Legs | Player |
|---|---|---|
| Peter Manley (England); 94.09 | 8 – 3 | (England) Dennis Priestley; 84.47 |
| Terry Jenkins (England); 87.32 | 0 – 8 | (England) Colin Lloyd; 96.97 |
| Raymond van Barneveld (Netherlands); 92.49 | 8 – 5 | (Netherlands) Roland Scholten; 91.54 |
| Adrian Lewis (England); 94.23 | 2 – 8 | (England) Phil Taylor; 101.45 |
High Checkout: Roland Scholten 120

==== 3 May – Week 14 ====
(England) National Indoor Arena, Birmingham

| Player | Legs | Player |
|---|---|---|
| Roland Scholten (Netherlands); 94.79 | 4 – 8 | (England) Adrian Lewis; 102.67 |
| Colin Lloyd (England); 89.72 | 8 – 6 | (England) Dennis Priestley; 90.95 |
| Peter Manley (England); 84.42 | 7 – 7 | (England) Terry Jenkins; 88.43 |
| Phil Taylor (England); 104.73 | 8 – 5 | (Netherlands) Raymond van Barneveld; 98.18 |
High Checkout: Peter Manley 120

=== Play-offs – 28 May ===
(England) Brighton Centre, Brighton

| | Score | |
|---|---|---|
Semi-finals (best of 21 legs)
| Phil Taylor (England); 98.79 | 11 – 6 | (England) Dennis Priestley; 89.20 |
| Raymond van Barneveld (Netherlands); 89.75 | 10 – 11 | (England) Terry Jenkins; 85.77 |
Final (best of 31 legs)
| Phil Taylor (England); 99.20 | 16 – 6 | (England) Terry Jenkins; 90.81 |
High Checkout: Terry Jenkins 161

== Table and streaks ==
=== Table ===
| Pos | Name | Pld | W | D | L | Pts | LF | LA | +/- | LWAT | 100+ | 140+ | 180s | A | HC |
|---|---|---|---|---|---|---|---|---|---|---|---|---|---|---|---|
| 1 | (England) Phil Taylor W | 14 | 11 | 3 | 0 | 25 | 109 | 52 | +57 | 43 | 214 | 105 | 39 | 100.87 | 170 |
| 2 | (Netherlands) Raymond van Barneveld | 14 | 7 | 3 | 4 | 17 | 98 | 82 | +16 | 32 | 239 | 108 | 67 | 96.59 | 170 |
| 3 | (England) Terry Jenkins RU | 14 | 6 | 3 | 5 | 15 | 86 | 90 | −4 | 26 | 250 | 132 | 38 | 93.72 | 157 |
| 4 | (England) Dennis Priestley | 14 | 5 | 3 | 6 | 13 | 88 | 87 | +1 | 34 | 231 | 134 | 36 | 92.46 | 140 |
| 5 | (England) Colin Lloyd | 14 | 6 | 0 | 8 | 12 | 85 | 87 | −2 | 33 | 209 | 112 | 41 | 94.15 | 108 |
| 6 | (England) Peter Manley | 14 | 4 | 3 | 7 | 11 | 73 | 96 | −23 | 26 | 229 | 105 | 18 | 88.41 | 138 |
| 7 | (England) Adrian Lewis | 14 | 5 | 0 | 9 | 10 | 69 | 96 | −27 | 24 | 176 | 120 | 50 | 93.20 | 164 |
| 8 | (Netherlands) Roland Scholten | 14 | 3 | 3 | 8 | 9 | 79 | 97 | −18 | 27 | 209 | 152 | 48 | 95.00 | 146 |

NB: LWAT = Legs Won Against Throw. Players separated by +/- leg difference if tied.

=== Streaks ===
| Player | Week | | | | | | | | | | | | | | Play-offs | |
| Player | 1 | 2 | 3 | 4 | 5 | 6 | 7 | 8 | 9 | 10 | 11 | 12 | 13 | 14 | SF | F |
|---|---|---|---|---|---|---|---|---|---|---|---|---|---|---|---|---|
| (England) Phil Taylor | D | D | W | W | W | W | W | D | W | W | W | W | W | W | W | W |
| (Netherlands) Raymond van Barneveld | W | W | D | D | L | W | L | W | L | D | W | W | W | L | L | |
| (England) Terry Jenkins | L | W | L | D | W | W | W | D | W | L | L | W | L | D | W | L |
| (England) Dennis Priestley | W | D | W | W | W | L | W | D | L | D | L | L | L | L | L | |
| (England) Colin Lloyd | L | L | L | W | L | L | L | W | W | L | W | L | W | W | | |
| (England) Peter Manley | W | L | D | L | L | W | L | L | W | D | L | L | W | D | | |
| (England) Adrian Lewis | L | W | W | L | L | L | L | L | L | W | W | L | L | W | | |
| (Netherlands) Roland Scholten | D | L | L | L | W | L | W | D | L | D | L | W | L | L | | |

NB: W = Won D = Drawn L = Lost

== Player statistics ==
The following statistics are for the league stage only. Playoffs are not included.

=== Phil Taylor ===
- Longest unbeaten run: 14
- Most consecutive wins: 6
- Most consecutive draws: 2
- Most consecutive losses: 0
- Longest without a win: 2
- Biggest victory: 8–1 (v. Colin Lloyd, v. Terry Jenkins and v. Peter Manley)
- Biggest defeat: Player Undefeated

=== Raymond van Barneveld ===
- Longest unbeaten run: 4
- Most consecutive wins: 3
- Most consecutive draws: 2
- Most consecutive losses: 1
- Longest without a win: 3
- Biggest victory: 8–1 (v. Roland Scholten)
- Biggest defeat: 4–8 (v. Dennis Priestley)

=== Terry Jenkins ===
- Longest unbeaten run: 6
- Most consecutive wins: 3
- Most consecutive draws: 1
- Most consecutive losses: 2
- Longest without a win: 2
- Biggest victory: 8–1 (v. Adrian Lewis)
- Biggest defeat: 0–8 (v. Colin Lloyd)

=== Dennis Priestley ===
- Longest unbeaten run: 5
- Most consecutive wins: 3
- Most consecutive draws: 1
- Most consecutive losses: 4
- Longest without a win: 7
- Biggest victory: 8–1 (v. Adrian Lewis)
- Biggest defeat: 2–8 (v. Phil Taylor)

=== Colin Lloyd ===
- Longest unbeaten run: 2
- Most consecutive wins: 2
- Most consecutive draws: 0
- Most consecutive losses: 3
- Longest without a win: 3
- Biggest victory: 8–0 (v. Terry Jenkins)
- Biggest defeat: 1–8 (v. Phil Taylor)

=== Peter Manley ===
- Longest unbeaten run: 2
- Most consecutive wins: 1
- Most consecutive draws: 1
- Most consecutive losses: 2
- Longest without a win: 4
- Biggest victory: 8–3 (v. Dennis Priestley)
- Biggest defeat: 1–8 (v. Phil Taylor)

=== Adrian Lewis ===
- Longest unbeaten run: 2
- Most consecutive wins: 2
- Most consecutive draws: 0
- Most consecutive losses: 6
- Longest without a win: 6
- Biggest victory: 8–4 (v. Peter Manley and v. Roland Scholten)
- Biggest defeat: 1–8 (v. Dennis Priestley and v. Terry Jenkins)

=== Roland Scholten ===
- Longest unbeaten run: 2
- Most consecutive wins: 1
- Most consecutive draws: 1
- Most consecutive losses: 3
- Longest without a win: 4
- Biggest victory: 8–2 (v. Peter Manley)
- Biggest defeat: 1–8 (v. Raymond van Barneveld)
