= 2017 PDC Calendar =

Darts season

This is the schedule of Professional Darts Corporation (PDC) events on the 2017 calendar, with player progression documented from the quarterfinals stage where applicable. This list includes European tour events, Players Championships events, World Series of Darts events and PDC majors. This list does not include regional tours or British Darts Organisation (BDO) events.

== January ==
Date	Tournament	Champions	Runners-up	Semifinalists	Quarterfinalists
19-22 January	2017 Qualifying School; Wigan, England	Does not apply.			
27-29 January	2017 The Masters Milton Keynes, England	(Netherlands) Michael van Gerwen	(Scotland) Gary Anderson	(England) Adrian Lewis (England) Phil Taylor	(Austria) Mensur Suljović (Netherlands) Raymond van Barneveld (Scotland) Robert Thornton (Scotland) Peter Wright

== February ==
Date	Tournament	Champions	Runners-up	Semifinalists	Quarterfinalists
2 February	2017 Premier League Day 1 Newcastle, England	Does not apply.			
3 February	UK Open Q1 Wigan, England	(Scotland) Peter Wright	(England) Adrian Lewis	(England) Peter Hudson (England) Ricky Evans	(England) Steve Beaton (Australia) Kyle Anderson (Netherlands) Benito van de Pas (Republic of Ireland) William O'Connor
3 February	2017 DPA World Series Qualifier 1 Sydney, Australia	(Australia) John Weber	(Australia) Lucas Cameron	(Australia) Rhys Mathewson (Australia) Steve Duke	(Australia) Mike Bonser (New Zealand) Cody Harris (Australia) Corey Cadby (Australia) Daniel Sim
4 February	UK Open Q2 Wigan, England	(Australia) Simon Whitlock	(Scotland) Gary Anderson	(England) Dave Chisnall (Netherlands) Jelle Klaasen	(England) Ian White (Northern Ireland) Brendan Dolan (England) Steve Beaton (England) Ryan Palmer
4 February	2017 Australian Tour 1 Sydney, Australia	(New Zealand) Cody Harris	(Australia) Corey Cadby	(Australia) John Weber (Australia) Rhys Mathewson	(Australia) Brian Roach (Australia) Gordon Mathers (Australia) Lucas Cameron (Australia) Jeremy Fagg
5 February	UK Open Q3 Wigan, England	(Scotland) Peter Wright	(England) Michael Smith	(England) Mick Todd (England) Ian White	(Netherlands) Michael van Gerwen (Spain) Cristo Reyes (England) Alan Norris (England) Mervyn King
5 February	2017 Australian Tour 2 Sydney, Australia	(Australia) Corey Cadby	(Australia) John Weber	(New Zealand) Cody Harris (Australia) Tic Bridge	(Australia) Gordon Mathers (Australia) Kevin Luland (Australia) Bill Aitken (Australia) Steve Duke
9 February	2017 Premier League Day 2 Nottingham, England	Does not apply.			
10 February	UK Open Q4 Wigan, England	(Netherlands) Michael van Gerwen	(Scotland) Gary Anderson	(England) Kevin Painter (England) Ryan Searle	(Scotland) Peter Wright (England) Chris Dobey (England) Michael Smith (England) Dave Chisnall
11 February	UK Open Q5 Wigan, England	(Australia) Simon Whitlock	(Belgium) Ronny Huybrechts	(England) Rob Cross (England) Michael Smith	(England) Mervyn King (England) Darren Webster (Netherlands) Jelle Klaasen (Wales) Gerwyn Price
12 February	UK Open Q6 Wigan, England	(Scotland) Peter Wright	(England) James Wade	(England) Adrian Lewis (England) Alan Norris	(England) Steve Beaton (Belgium) Kim Huybrechts (Northern Ireland) Brendan Dolan (Australia) Kyle Anderson
16 February	2017 Premier League Day 3 Leeds, England	Does not apply.			
17 February	2017 European Tour 1 - Nordic & Baltic Qualifier; Copenhagen, Denmark	Does not apply.			
17 February	2017 European Tour 2 - Nordic & Baltic Qualifier; Copenhagen, Denmark	Does not apply.			
17 February	2017 DPA World Series Qualifier 2 Melbourne, Australia	(Australia) Justin Thompson	(Australia) Corey Cadby	(Australia) John Weber (Australia) Tic Bridge	(Australia) Rhys Mathewson (Australia) Jeff Hutcheon (Australia) Harley Kemp (Australia) Steve Duke Jnr.
18 February	2017 Development Tour 1 Wigan, England	(England) Luke Humphries	(Canada) Dawson Murschell	(England) Adam Hunt (Belgium) Kenny Neyens	(Belgium) Dimitri Van den Bergh (France) Charlie Beaumont (Austria) Rowby-John Rodriguez (Germany) Martin Schindler
18 February	2017 Development Tour 2 Wigan, England	(Belgium) Dimitri Van den Bergh	(Belgium) Kenny Neyens	(England) Adam Hunt (Germany) Martin Schindler	(Republic of Ireland) Steve Lennon (England) Sam Head (England) Ryan Meikle (England) Rhys Hayden
18 February	2017 Nordic & Baltic Tour 1 Copenhagen, Denmark	(Finland) Kim Viljanen	(Sweden) Magnus Caris	(Sweden) Dennis Nilsson (Sweden) Daniel Larsson	(Denmark) Alex Brian Jensen (Finland) Marko Kantele (Sweden) Göran Erikson (Latvia) Madars Razma
18 February	2017 European Tour 3 - Nordic & Baltic Qualifier; Copenhagen, Denmark	Does not apply.			
18 February	2017 Australian Tour 3 Melbourne, Australia	(Australia) Lucas Cameron	(Australia) Corey Cadby	(Australia) Tony Birtwistle (Australia) Gordon Mathers	(Australia) Rhys Mathewson (Australia) Robbie King (Australia) Scott Kennedy (Australia) Matthew Leahy
19 February	2017 Development Tour 3 Wigan, England	(England) Ryan Meikle	(England) Harry Ward	(Austria) Rowby-John Rodriguez (England) Adam Hunt	(Germany) Nico Blum (England) Sam Hewson (England) Andrew Davidson (England) Callum Loose
19 February	2017 Development Tour 4 Wigan, England	(England) Luke Humphries	(Belgium) Kenny Neyens	(England) Ronnie Roberts (England) Ted Evetts	(England) Stephen Rosney (Netherlands) Jimmy Hendriks (England) Scott Dale (Republic of Ireland) Dean Finn
19 February	2017 Nordic & Baltic Tour 2 Copenhagen, Denmark	(Finland) Kim Viljanen	(Finland) Marko Kantele	(Sweden) Oskar Lukasiak (Sweden) Daniel Larsson	(Denmark) Per Knutson (Norway) Cor Dekker (Denmark) Brian Christensen (Denmark) Alex Brian Jensen
19 February	2017 Australian Tour 4 Melbourne, Australia	(Australia) Rhys Mathewson	(Australia) Lucas Cameron	(Australia) Justin Thompson (Australia) Tic Bridge	(Australia) Gordon Mathers (Australia) Ash Britt (Australia) Steve Duke (Australia) Aaron Petty
23 February	2017 Premier League Day 4 Brighton, England	Does not apply.			
25 February	2017 Players Championship 1 Barnsley, England	(England) Alan Norris	(England) Peter Jacques	(Australia) Simon Whitlock (England) James Wade	(Australia) Kyle Anderson (England) Michael Smith (England) Steve West (Spain) Cristo Reyes
25 February	2017 European Tour 1 - East European Qualifier; Budapest, Hungary	Does not apply.			
25 February	2017 European Tour 2 - East European Qualifier; Budapest, Hungary	Does not apply.			
25 February	2017 EADC Tour 1 Moscow, Russia	(Russia) Boris Koltsov	(Russia) Evgenii Izotov	(Russia) Maxim Belov (Russia) Dmitry Shepkin	(Russia) Maxim Aldoshin (Russia) Aleksander Shevel (Russia) Igor Dzasokhov (Russia) Vladimir Akshulakov
26 February	2017 Players Championship 2 Barnsley, England	(Scotland) Gary Anderson	(Scotland) Peter Wright	(Netherlands) Jelle Klaasen (Northern Ireland) Daryl Gurney	(England) Michael Smith (England) James Wade (Netherlands) Raymond van Barneveld (Wales) Robert Owen
26 February	2017 European Tour 3 - East European Qualifier; Budapest, Hungary	Does not apply.			
26 February	2017 EADC Tour 2 Moscow, Russia	(Russia) Aleksandr Oreshkin	(Russia) Boris Koltsov	(Russia) Maxim Aldoshin (Russia) Igor Dzasokhov	(Russia) Aleksander Shevel (Russia) Oleg Titkov (Russia) Aleksander Mikhailov (Russia) Roman Obukhov

== March ==
Date	Tournament	Champions	Runners-up	Semifinalists	Quarterfinalists
2 March	2017 Premier League Day 5 Exeter, England	Does not apply.			
3-5 March	2017 UK Open Minehead, England	(Scotland) Peter Wright	(Wales) Gerwyn Price	(Northern Ireland) Daryl Gurney (England) Alan Norris	(Netherlands) Raymond van Barneveld (England) Ian White (Australia) Simon Whitlock (Belgium) Kim Huybrechts
9 March	2017 Premier League Day 6 Glasgow, Scotland	Does not apply.			
10 March	2017 European Tour 1 - UK Qualifier; Barnsley, England	Does not apply.			
10 March	2017 DPA World Series Qualifier 3 NDDA, Australia	(Australia) Corey Cadby	(Australia) Rhys Mathewson	(Australia) Lucas Cameron (Australia) Ray O'Donnell	(Australia) Justin Thompson (Australia) Matt Leahy (Australia) Jed Netherott (Australia) Michael Conlan
11 March	2017 Players Championship 3 Barnsley, England	(England) Rob Cross	(England) Mervyn King	(Wales) Gerwyn Price (England) Steve West	(Netherlands) Raymond van Barneveld (England) Ritchie Edhouse (Northern Ireland) Daryl Gurney (England) Michael Smith
11 March	2017 Australian Tour 5 NDDA, Australia	(Australia) Justin Thompson	(Australia) John Weber	(Australia) Peter Machin (Australia) Chris Vasey	(Australia) Ray O'Donnell (Australia) Lucas Cameron (Australia) Rhys Mathewson (Australia) Dylan Mitchell
12 March	2017 Players Championship 4 Barnsley, England	(Australia) Simon Whitlock	(England) Darren Johnson	(Belgium) Kim Huybrechts (Netherlands) Michael van Gerwen	(Scotland) Gary Anderson (Netherlands) Benito van de Pas (Netherlands) Dirk van Duijvenbode (England) Ian White
12 March	2017 Australian Tour 6 NDDA, Australia	(Australia) Rhys Mathewson	(Australia) Corey Cadby	(Australia) Ray O'Donnell (Australia) Peter Machin	(Australia) Aaron Morrison (Australia) Zaine Skelton (Australia) Lucas Cameron (Australia) Gary Kennedy
16 March	2017 Premier League Day 7 Rotterdam, Netherlands	Does not apply.			
17 March	2017 European Tour 4 - Nordic & Baltic Qualifier; Gothenburg, Sweden	Does not apply.			
17 March	2017 European Tour 5 - Nordic & Baltic Qualifier; Gothenburg, Sweden	Does not apply.			
18 March	2017 Development Tour 5 Barnsley, England	(Belgium) Kenny Neyens	(England) Adam Hunt	(England) Luke Humphries (Spain) Jaime Cortes	(England) Joe Davis (England) Adam Smith-Neale (Belgium) Mike De Decker (England) Jarred Cole
18 March	2017 Development Tour 6 Barnsley, England	(Belgium) Dimitri Van den Bergh	(England) Adam Hunt	(England) Greg Ritchie (Belgium) Mike De Decker	(England) Josh Payne (Belgium) Brian Raman (England) Jake Jones (England) Rob Hewson
18 March	2017 Nordic & Baltic Tour 3 Gothenburg, Sweden	(Finland) Kim Viljanen	(Sweden) Daniel Larsson	(Sweden) Magnus Caris (Finland) Marko Kantele	(Sweden) Ricky Nauman (Denmark) Alex Brian Jensen (Sweden) Dennis Nilsson (Sweden) Göran Eriksson
18 March	2017 European Tour 6 - Nordic & Baltic Qualifier; Gothenburg, Sweden	Does not apply.			
19 March	2017 Development Tour 7 Barnsley, England	(England) Adam Hunt	(England) Stephen Rosney	(Belgium) Dimitri Van den Bergh (Republic of Ireland) Steve Lennon	(England) John Brown (England) Andy Alker (Austria) Rowby-John Rodriguez (Belgium) Kenny Neyens
19 March	2017 Development Tour 8 Barnsley, England	(Republic of Ireland) Steve Lennon	(England) Ted Evetts	(England) Joe Davis (England) Luke Humphries	(England) Ryan Meikle (England) Ryan Hoggarth (England) John Brown (Spain) Jaime Cortes
19 March	2017 Nordic & Baltic Tour 4 Gothenburg, Sweden	(Finland) Kim Viljanen	(Sweden) Ricky Nauman	(Sweden) Magnus Caris (Denmark) Steen Lysen	(Denmark) Per Knutsson (Sweden) Daniel Larsson (Sweden) Dennis Nilsson (Finland) Marko Kantele
23 March	2017 Premier League Day 8 Manchester, England	Does not apply.			
23 March	2017 European Tour 1 - West/South European Qualifier; Hildesheim, Germany	Does not apply.			
23 March	2017 European Tour 1 - Home Nation Qualifier; Hildesheim, Germany	Does not apply.			
23 March	2017 European Tour 2 - West/South European Qualifier; Hildesheim, Germany	Does not apply.			
24-26 March	2017 European Tour 1 Hildesheim, Germany	(Scotland) Peter Wright	(Netherlands) Michael van Gerwen	(Wales) Gerwyn Price (Netherlands) Jelle Klaasen	(Belgium) Kim Huybrechts (England) Ian White (Austria) Mensur Suljović (Netherlands) Benito van de Pas
24 March	2017 DPA World Series Qualifier 4 Warilla Bowls, Australia	(New Zealand) Cody Harris	(Australia) Lucas Cameron	(Australia) Tic Bridge (Australia) Justin Thompson	(Australia) Dean McGladdery (Australia) Corey Cadby (Australia) Jerry Weyman (Australia) Kevin Luland
25 March	2017 Challenge Tour 1 Milton Keynes, England	(England) Aaron Dyer	(England) Mark Frost	(England) Jason Lovett (England) Alan Tabern	(Wales) Barrie Bates (Scotland) Jim Walker (England) Kurt Parry (England) Martin Lukeman
25 March	2017 Challenge Tour 2 Milton Keynes, England	(England) Paul Milford	(England) Martin Lukeman	(England) Alan Tabern (England) Mike Norton	(Gibraltar) Pete Dyos (Scotland) Ryan Murray (England) Sam Head (England) Jason Wilson
25 March	2017 Australian Tour 7 Warilla Bowls, Australia	(New Zealand) Cody Harris	(Australia) Rhys Mathewson	(Australia) Lucas Cameron (Australia) Gordon Mathers	(Australia) Robbie King (Australia) Dave Marland (Australia) Kalani Hillman (Australia) Corey Cadby
25 March	2017 EADC Tour 3 Moscow, Russia	(Russia) Aleksander Shevel	(Russia) Maxim Belov	(Russia) Evgenii Izotov	(Russia) Boris Koltsov (Russia) Igor Dzasokhov (Russia) Maxim Aldoshin (Russia) Dmitry Zhavoronkov (Russia) Aleksandr Oreshkin
26 March	2017 Challenge Tour 3 Milton Keynes, England	(England) Lee Evans	(England) Kevin Dowling	(England) Mark Frost (England) Ian Lever	(England) Joey Palfreyman (England) Peter Jacques (England) Kevin McDine (England) Mark Devon
26 March	2017 Challenge Tour 4 Milton Keynes, England	(England) Aaron Dyer	(England) Mark Wilson	(England) Dan Read (England) Peter Hudson	(England) Craig Gilchrist (England) Stuart Dutton (Netherlands) Mareno Michels (England) Scott Dale
26 March	2017 Australian Tour 8 Warilla Bowls, Australia	(Australia) Corey Cadby	(Australia) Gordon Mathers	(New Zealand) Cody Harris (Australia) Rhys Mathewson	(Australia) Kalani Hillman (Australia) Craig Prizeman (Australia) Mike Bonser (Australia) Robbie King
26 March	2017 EADC Tour 4 Moscow, Russia	(Russia) Roman Obukhov	(Russia) Aleksandr Oreshkin	(Russia) Aleksei Kadochnikov (Belarus) Andrey Pontus	(Russia) Evgenii Izotov (Ukraine) Grigory Kirilenko (Russia) Boris Koltsov (Russia) Maxim Aldoshin
30 March	2017 Premier League Day 9 Cardiff, Wales	Does not apply.			
31 March	2017 European Tour 2 - UK Qualifier; Cardiff, Wales	Does not apply.			

== April ==
Date	Tournament	Champions	Runners-up	Semifinalists	Quarterfinalists
1 April	2017 Players Championship 5 Milton Keynes, England	(England) Adrian Lewis	(England) Dave Chisnall	(Netherlands) Michael van Gerwen (England) Alan Norris	(England) Ian White (England) Richard North (England) Steve Beaton (Wales) Mark Webster
2 April	2017 Players Championship 6 Milton Keynes, England	(Netherlands) Michael van Gerwen	(Scotland) Peter Wright	(England) Mervyn King (Austria) Mensur Suljović	(Belgium) Kim Huybrechts (Netherlands) Raymond van Barneveld (England) Richard North (Australia) Simon Whitlock
6 April	2017 Premier League Day 10; Dublin, Ireland	Does not apply.			
7 April	2017 European Tour 3 - UK Qualifier; Barnsley, England	Does not apply.			
7 April	2017 DPA World Series Qualifier 5 Osborne Park Bowling Club, Australia	(New Zealand) Koha Kokiri	(Australia) Clinton Bridge	(Australia) Corey Cadby (Australia) Barry Gardner	(Australia) Beau Anderson (Australia) Damon Heta (Australia) Dan Kelly (Australia) Aaron Petty
8 April	2017 Players Championship 7 Barnsley, England	(Northern Ireland) Daryl Gurney	(Belgium) Kim Huybrechts	(Netherlands) Jermaine Wattimena (Wales) Gerwyn Price	(Scotland) Peter Wright (Netherlands) Benito van de Pas (Austria) Mensur Suljović (Republic of Ireland) Steve Lennon
8 April	2017 Australian Tour 9 Osborne Park Bowling Club, Australia	(Australia) Gordon Mathers	(Australia) Corey Cadby	(New Zealand) Koha Kokiri (Australia) Justin Thompson	(Australia) Tic Bridge (Australia) Damon Heta (Australia) Rhys Mathewson (Australia) Aaron Petty
9 April	2017 Players Championship 8 Barnsley, England	(England) Joe Cullen	(Northern Ireland) Daryl Gurney	(England) Mervyn King (England) James Wade	(England) Robbie Green (England) Stuart Kellett (Wales) Gerwyn Price (England) James Richardson
9 April	2017 Australian Tour 10 Osborne Park Bowling Club, Australia	(Australia) Gordon Mathers	(New Zealand) Koha Kokiri	(Australia) Damon Heta (Australia) Justin Thompson	(Australia) Clinton Bridge (Australia) Corey Cadby (Australia) Kalani Hillman (Australia) Rhys Mathewson
13 April	2017 Premier League Day 11; Liverpool, England	Does not apply.			
14 April	2017 European Tour 2 - Home Nation Qualifier; Jena, Germany	Does not apply.			
15-17 April	2017 European Tour 2 Jena, Germany	(Netherlands) Michael van Gerwen	(Netherlands) Jelle Klaasen	(England) James Wade (Australia) Simon Whitlock	(Australia) Kyle Anderson (Netherlands) Raymond van Barneveld (England) Michael Smith (Scotland) Peter Wright
15 April	2017 Challenge Tour 5 Barnsley, England	(England) Ryan Harrington	(England) Mark Frost	(England) Allan Edwards (England) Kevin McDine	(England) Eddie Dootson (England) Paul Harvey (England) Aaron Dyer (England) Wayne Jones
15 April	2017 Challenge Tour 6 Barnsley, England	(England) Wayne Jones	(England) Jason Wilson	(England) Charlie Jackson (England) Lee Evans	(England) Ryan Harrington (England) Peter Jacques (England) Stuart Kellett (England) David Evans
16 April	2017 Challenge Tour 7 Barnsley, England	(England) Mark Dudbridge	(England) Alan Tabern	(England) Jason Lovett (England) Kevin Dowling	(England) Tim Hope (England) Gary Butcher (England) Brett Claydon (England) Matt Padgett
16 April	2017 Challenge Tour 8 Barnsley, England	(England) Wayne Jones	(England) Jay Foreman	(England) Jason Lovett (England) Luke Humphries	(England) Paul Milford (Austria) Rusty-Jake Rodriguez (England) Curtis Hammond (England) Lee Evans
20 April	2017 Premier League Day 12; Belfast, Northern Ireland	Does not apply.			
20 April	2017 European Tour 3 - West/South European Qualifier; Saarbrücken, Germany	Does not apply.			
20 April	2017 European Tour 3 - Home Nation Qualifier; Saarbrücken, Germany	Does not apply.			
21-23 April	2017 European Tour 3 Saarbrücken, Germany	(Scotland) Peter Wright	(Netherlands) Benito van de Pas	(England) Ian White (Netherlands) Jelle Klaasen	(Netherlands) Michael van Gerwen (England) Rob Cross (Wales) Gerwyn Price (Austria) Mensur Suljović
27 April	2017 Premier League Day 13; Birmingham, England	Does not apply.			
28 April	2017 European Tour 4 - UK Qualifier; Wigan, England	Does not apply.			
28 April	2017 European Tour 5 - UK Qualifier; Wigan, England	Does not apply.			
28 April	2017 DPA World Series Qualifier 6 Hobart, Australia	(New Zealand) Cody Harris	(Australia) Dave Marland	(Australia) Bill Aitken (Australia) Clinton Bridge	(Australia) Michael Pearce (Australia) Lucas Cameron (Australia) Robbie King (Australia) Steve Fitzpatrick
29 April	2017 Players Championship 9 Wigan, England	(Netherlands) Michael van Gerwen	(Scotland) Robert Thornton	(Netherlands) Jan Dekker (England) Robbie Green	(England) Adrian Lewis (England) Dave Chisnall (Belgium) Mike De Decker (Wales) Jonathan Worsley
29 April	2017 Australian Tour 11 Hobart, Australia	(New Zealand) Cody Harris	(Australia) Gordon Mathers	(Australia) John Bunyard (Australia) Lucas Cameron	(Australia) Robbie King (Australia) Dwayne Seabourne (Australia) Clinton Bridge (Australia) Jamie Hales
29 April	2017 European Tour 4 - East European Qualifier; Modlniczka, Poland	Does not apply.			
29 April	2017 European Tour 5 - East European Qualifier; Modlniczka, Poland	Does not apply.			
29 April	2017 EADC Tour 5 Moscow, Russia	(Russia) Evgenii Izotov	(Russia) Aleksandr Oreshkin	(Russia) Boris Koltsov (Russia) Vadim Burykin	(Russia) Igor Dzasokhov (Russia) Maxim Aldoshin (Russia) Evgenie Ivanov (Russia) Roman Obukhov
30 April	2017 Players Championship 10 Wigan, England	(Scotland) Gary Anderson	(Scotland) Peter Wright	(England) Steve West (England) Michael Smith	(Wales) Jonny Clayton (England) Alan Norris (England) Ryan Searle (England) Ian White
30 April	2017 Australian Tour 12 Hobart, Australia	(Australia) Justin Thompson	(Australia) Rhys Mathewson	(Australia) Michael Pearce (New Zealand) Cody Harris	(Australia) Ash Britt (Australia) Steve Fitzpatrick (Australia) Gordon Mathers (Australia) Bill Aitken
30 April	2017 European Tour 6 - East European Qualifier; Modlniczka, Poland	Does not apply.			
30 April	2017 EADC Tour 6 Moscow, Russia	(Russia) Boris Koltsov	(Russia) Aleksandr Oreshkin	(Russia) Alexsander Shevel (Russia) Igor Dzasokhov	(Russia) Vadim Burykin (Russia) Evgenie Ivanov (Russia) Evgenii Izatov (Russia) Maxim Belov

== May ==
Date	Tournament	Champions	Runners-up	Semifinalists	Quarterfinalists
4 May	2017 Premier League Day 14; Sheffield, England	Does not apply.			
4 May	2017 European Tour 4 - West/South European Qualifier; Sindelfingen, Germany	Does not apply.			
4 May	2017 European Tour 4 - Home Nation Qualifier; Sindelfingen, Germany	Does not apply.			
4 May	2017 European Tour 5 - West/South European Qualifier; Sindelfingen, Germany	Does not apply.			
5-7 May	2017 European Tour 4 Sindelfingen, Germany	(Scotland) Peter Wright	(Netherlands) Michael van Gerwen	(England) Dave Chisnall (Netherlands) Jelle Klaasen	(Netherlands) Benito van de Pas (England) Rob Cross (Netherlands) Jan Dekker (England) Joe Cullen
11 May	2017 Premier League Day 15; Aberdeen, Scotland	Does not apply.			
11 May	2017 European Tour 5 - Home Nation Qualifier; Gibraltar	Does not apply.			
12-14 May	2017 European Tour 5 Gibraltar	(England) Michael Smith	(Austria) Mensur Suljović	(Scotland) Peter Wright (Northern Ireland) Daryl Gurney	(England) Darren Johnson (England) Rob Cross (Sweden) Magnus Caris (England) James Wilson
12 May	2017 DPA World Series Qualifier 7 Mermaid Waters Hotel, Australia	(Australia) Corey Cadby	(Australia) Rhys Mathewson	(Australia) Justin Thompson (Australia) Steve McArthur	(Australia) Pat Orreal (Australia) Steve Duke (Australia) Andrew Eagers (Australia) Jeremy Fagg
13 May	2017 Challenge Tour 9 Milton Keynes, England	(England) Nathan Aspinall	(Poland) Radoslaw Szaganski	(England) Kevin Dowling (England) Mark Dudbridge	(Wales) Justin Smith (England) Dan Read (England) Wayne Jones (England) Robert Rickwood
13 May	2017 Challenge Tour 10 Milton Keynes, England	(England) Robert Rickwood	(England) Jason Wilson	(England) Alex Roy (England) Dan Read	(England) Peter Hudson (Wales) Craig Gilchrist (England) Jack Todd (England) Nigel Birch
13 May	2017 Australian Tour 13 Mermaid Waters Hotel, Australia	(Australia) Clinton Bridge	(Australia) Gordon Mathers	(Australia) Justin Thompson (Australia) Steve Duke	(Australia) Glenn Jones (Australia) Robbie King (New Zealand) John Griffiths (Australia) Lucas Cameron
14 May	2017 Challenge Tour 11 Milton Keynes, England	(England) Peter Jacques	(England) Wayne Jones	(England) James Hubbard (England) Ian Jones	(Wales) Martin Thomas (England) Peter Mitchell (England) Paul Harvey (England) Nigel Heydon
14 May	2017 Challenge Tour 12 Milton Keynes, England	(England) Luke Humphries	(England) Andy Smith	(England) Joshua Richardson (England) Nick Fullwell	(England) Brett Claydon (England) Aaron Dyer (South Africa) Warrick Scheffer (England) Peter Jacques
14 May	2017 Australian Tour 14 Mermaid Waters Hotel, Australia	(Australia) Gordon Mathers	(Australia) Corey Cadby	(Australia) Steve Duke (Australia) Rhys Mathewson	(Australia) Arthur Jones (Australia) Michael Cassar (Australia) John Griffiths (Australia) Clinton Bridge
18 May	2017 Premier League play-offs London, England	(Netherlands) Michael van Gerwen	(Scotland) Peter Wright	(Scotland) Gary Anderson (England) Phil Taylor	Does not apply.
19 May	2017 European Tour 6 - UK Qualifier; Milton Keynes, England	Does not apply.			
19 May	2017 European Tour 7 - UK Qualifier; Milton Keynes, England	Does not apply.			
19 May	2017 European Tour 7 - Nordic & Baltic Qualifier; Oslo, Norway	Does not apply.			
19 May	2017 European Tour 8 - Nordic & Baltic Qualifier; Oslo, Norway	Does not apply.			
20 May	2017 Nordic & Baltic Tour 5 Oslo, Norway	(Sweden) Dennis Nilsson	(Denmark) Per Laursen	(Denmark) Alex Brian Jensen (Finland) Kim Viljanen	(Finland) Marko Kantele (Norway) Cor Dekker (Denmark) Niels Heinsø (Finland) Heikki Hyvönen
20 May	2017 European Tour 9 - Nordic & Baltic Qualifier; Oslo, Norway	Does not apply.			
20 May	2017 Players Championship 11 Milton Keynes, England	(Scotland) Peter Wright	(Northern Ireland) Daryl Gurney	(England) Rob Cross (England) Andy Boulton	(Netherlands) Jeffrey de Graaf (Wales) Jonny Clayton (Austria) Mensur Suljović (Australia) Simon Whitlock
21 May	2017 Nordic & Baltic Tour 6 Oslo, Norway	(Finland) Marko Kantele	(Denmark) Per Laursen	(Finland) Kim Viljanen (Denmark) Alex Brian Jensen	(Sweden) Magnus Caris (Sweden) Daniel Larsson (Finland) Ulf Ceder (Sweden) Dennis Nilsson
21 May	2017 Players Championship 12 Milton Keynes, England	(England) Rob Cross	(England) Ian White	(England) James Wilson (Belgium) Kim Huybrechts	(Scotland) Peter Wright (Wales) Jonny Clayton (England) Darren Webster (Australia) Simon Whitlock
24-25 May	2017 Dubai Duty Free Darts Masters Dubai, UAE	(Scotland) Gary Anderson	(Netherlands) Michael van Gerwen	(Wales) Gerwyn Price (Scotland) Peter Wright	(Netherlands) Raymond van Barneveld (England) James Wade (England) Phil Taylor (England) Dave Chisnall
27 May	2017 Development Tour 9 Hildesheim, Germany	(England) Luke Humphries	(Belgium) Dimitri Van den Bergh	(Belgium) Mike De Decker (Netherlands) Justin van Tergouw	(England) Dan Read (Netherlands) Sven Groen (England) Josh Payne (Netherlands) Berry van Peer
27 May	2017 Development Tour 10 Hildesheim, Germany	(Netherlands) Mike van Duivenbode	(England) Adam Hunt	(Belgium) Kenny Neyens (Netherlands) Justin van Tergouw	(England) Callum Goffin (Canada) Dawson Murschell (England) Josh Payne (England) Reece Colley
28 May	2017 Development Tour 11 Hildesheim, Germany	(Netherlands) Jeffrey de Zwaan	(England) Adam Smith-Neale	(England) Bradley Kirk (Canada) Dawson Murschell	(Netherlands) Mike Zuydwijk (England) Callum Loose (Netherlands) Berry van Peer (Netherlands) Justin van Tergouw
28 May	2017 Development Tour 12 Hildesheim, Germany	(Austria) Rusty-Jake Rodriguez	(England) Harry Ward	(Netherlands) Mike van Duivenbode (England) Ted Evetts	(Belgium) Kenny Neyens (England) Adam Smith-Neale (England) Sam Hewson (England) Thomas Lovely
31 May	2017 European Tour 6 - West/South European Qualifier; Frankfurt, Germany	Does not apply.			
31 May	2017 European Tour 7 - West/South European Qualifier; Frankfurt, Germany	Does not apply.			

== June ==
Date	Tournament	Champions	Runners-up	Semifinalists	Quarterfinalists
1-4 June	2017 PDC World Cup of Darts Frankfurt, Germany	(Netherlands) van Gerwen/van Barneveld	(Wales) Price/Webster	(Belgium) K. Huybrechts/R. Huybrechts (England) Lewis/Chisnall	(Singapore) P. Lim/H. Lim (Russia) Oreshkin/Koltsov (Austria) Suljović/Rodriguez (Germany) Hopp/Schindler
8 June	2017 European Tour 6 - Home Nation Qualifier; Hamburg, Germany	Does not apply.			
9-11 June	2017 European Tour 6 Hamburg, Germany	(Netherlands) Michael van Gerwen	(Austria) Mensur Suljović	(England) Michael Smith (Spain) Cristo Reyes	(England) Peter Hudson (England) Joe Cullen (England) Dave Chisnall (England) Stephen Bunting
10 June	2017 Challenge Tour 13 Milton Keynes, England	(South Africa) Warrick Scheffer	(England) Mark Dudbridge	(England) Harry Ward (England) Andy Smith	(England) Barry Lynn (England) Kevin Dowling (Scotland) Evander Stevenson (England) Callum Loose
10 June	2017 Challenge Tour 14 Milton Keynes, England	(England) Kevin McDine	(England) Luke Humphries	(England) Scott Dale (England) Paul Milford	(Brazil) Diogo Portela (England) Alex Roy (England) James Hubbard (England) Mark Foreman
11 June	2017 Challenge Tour 15 Milton Keynes, England	(England) Mark Dudbridge	(England) Kevin Edwards	(England) Luke Humphries (Poland) Radoslaw Szaganski	(England) Michael Barnard (England) Mark Frost (England) Alan Tabern (England) Lisa Ashton
11 June	2017 Challenge Tour 16 Milton Keynes, England	(England) Matthew Edgar	(Wales) Barrie Bates	(England) Joe Davis (England) Alex Roy	(Wales) Kurt Parry (Wales) Wayne Thomas (England) Steve Brown (England) Josh McCarthy
16 June	2017 European Tour 8 - UK Qualifier; Wigan, England	Does not apply.			
16 June	2017 DPA World Series Qualifier 8 Osborne Park Bowling Club, Australia	(Australia) David Platt	(Australia) Corey Cadby	(Australia) Rhys Mathewson (Australia) Robbie King	(Australia) Tim Pusey (New Zealand) Koha Kokiri (Australia) Laurence Ryder (Australia) Daniel Waterhouse
17 June	2017 Players Championship 13 Wigan, England	(England) Steve Beaton	(Scotland) Gary Anderson	(England) Rob Cross (Northern Ireland) Daryl Gurney	(Scotland) Robert Thornton (England) Kirk Shepherd (Austria) Mensur Suljović (Belgium) Kim Huybrechts
17 June	2017 Australian Tour 15 Osborne Park Bowling Club, Australia	(Australia) Corey Cadby	(Australia) Barry Gardner	(Australia) David Platt (Australia) Alan Aird	(Australia) Rhys Mathewson (Australia) Adam Rowe (New Zealand) Koha Kokiri (Australia) Robbie King
18 June	2017 Players Championship 14 Wigan, England	(Scotland) Gary Anderson	(England) Ian White	(Scotland) Robert Thornton (England) Rob Cross	(Netherlands) Vincent van der Voort (Netherlands) Jeffrey de Zwaan (Northern Ireland) Daryl Gurney (England) Richard North
18 June	2017 Australian Tour 16 Osborne Park Bowling Club, Australia	(New Zealand) Koha Kokiri	(Australia) Rhys Mathewson	(Australia) Laurence Ryder (Australia) Brad Austen	(Australia) Tic Bridge (Australia) Kim Lewis (Australia) Robbie King (Australia) Barry Gardner
22 June	2017 European Tour 7 - Home Nation Qualifier; Vienna, Austria	Does not apply.			
22 June	2017 European Tour 7 - East European Qualifier; Schwechat, Austria	Does not apply.			
22 June	2017 European Tour 8 - East European Qualifier; Schwechat, Austria	Does not apply.			
23-25 June	2017 European Tour 7 Vienna, Austria	(Netherlands) Michael van Gerwen	(England) Michael Smith	(Spain) Cristo Reyes (England) Joe Cullen	(Germany) Martin Schindler (Northern Ireland) Daryl Gurney (Finland) Kim Viljanen (England) Mervyn King
29 June	2017 European Tour 8 - West/South European Qualifier; Leverkusen, Germany	Does not apply.			
29 June	2017 European Tour 8 - Home Nation Qualifier; Leverkusen, Germany	Does not apply.			
30 June-2 July	2017 European Tour 8 Leverkusen, Germany	(Scotland) Peter Wright	(England) Mervyn King	(England) Michael Smith (Austria) Mensur Suljović	(England) Rob Cross (Wales) Gerwyn Price (England) Dave Chisnall (Scotland) John Henderson

== July ==
Date	Tournament	Champions	Runners-up	Semifinalists	Quarterfinalists
7-8 July	2017 Shanghai Darts Masters Shanghai, China	(Netherlands) Michael van Gerwen	(England) Dave Chisnall	(England) James Wade (Netherlands) Raymond van Barneveld	(England) Phil Taylor (Wales) Gerwyn Price (Scotland) Peter Wright (Scotland) Gary Anderson
7 July	2017 European Tour 9 - UK Qualifier; Barnsley, England	Does not apply.			
8 July	2017 Players Championship 15 Barnsley, England	(England) Darren Webster	(Northern Ireland) Daryl Gurney	(Australia) Kyle Anderson (England) Justin Pipe	(England) Alan Norris (Wales) Jonny Clayton (Scotland) John Henderson (Belgium) Dimitri Van den Bergh
9 July	2017 Players Championship 16 Barnsley, England	(England) Joe Cullen	(Austria) Zoran Lerchbacher	(Northern Ireland) Daryl Gurney (England) Steve Beaton	(England) Ian White (Northern Ireland) Brendan Dolan (England) Nathan Aspinall (England) Keegan Brown
14-15 July	2017 US Darts Masters Las Vegas, USA	(Netherlands) Michael van Gerwen	(Northern Ireland) Daryl Gurney	(Wales) Gerwyn Price (Scotland) Gary Anderson	(Canada) Dawson Murschell (Canada) Dave Richardson (Netherlands) Raymond van Barneveld (Scotland) Peter Wright
22-30 July	2017 World Matchplay Blackpool, England	(England) Phil Taylor	(Scotland) Peter Wright	(England) Adrian Lewis (Northern Ireland) Daryl Gurney	(Netherlands) Michael van Gerwen (England) Alan Norris (Austria) Mensur Suljović (England) Darren Webster

== August ==
Date	Tournament	Champions	Runners-up	Semifinalists	Quarterfinalists
4 August	2017 European Tour 10 - UK Qualifier; Barnsley, England	Does not apply.			
4 August	2017 European Tour 11 - UK Qualifier; Barnsley, England	Does not apply.			
5 August	2017 Players Championship 17 Barnsley, England	(Australia) Kyle Anderson	(England) Kevin Painter	(Netherlands) Jermaine Wattimena (England) Michael Smith	(England) Justin Pipe (Wales) Gerwyn Price (Netherlands) Yordi Meeuwisse (England) Stephen Bunting
6 August	2017 Players Championship 18 Barnsley, England	(England) Dave Chisnall	(England) Richard North	(England) Stephen Bunting (England) Ryan Searle	(England) Joe Cullen (England) Alan Norris (Northern Ireland) Brendan Dolan (Republic of Ireland) William O'Connor
11-13 August	2017 Auckland Darts Masters Auckland, New Zealand	(Australia) Kyle Anderson	(Australia) Corey Cadby	(England) Phil Taylor (England) James Wade	(Australia) Simon Whitlock (England) Michael Smith (Netherlands) Raymond van Barneveld (Northern Ireland) Daryl Gurney
11 August	2017 European Tour 10 - Nordic & Baltic Qualifier; Helsinki, Finland	Does not apply.			
11 August	2017 European Tour 11 - Nordic & Baltic Qualifier; Helsinki, Finland	Does not apply.			
12 August	2017 Nordic & Baltic Tour 7 Helsinki, Finland	(Finland) Kim Viljanen	(Sweden) Magnus Caris	(Finland) Marko Kantele (Finland) Ulf Ceder	(Sweden) Dennis Nilsson (Sweden) Daniel Larsson (Finland) Petri Rasmus (Finland) Teemu Kaltii
12 August	2017 European Tour 12 - Nordic & Baltic Qualifier; Helsinki, Finland	Does not apply.			
13 August	2017 Nordic & Baltic Tour 8 Helsinki, Finland	(Finland) Marko Kantele	(Norway) Cor Dekker	(Sweden) Magnus Caris (Sweden) Dennis Nilsson	(Finland) Kim Viljanen (Latvia) Madars Razma (Finland) Ulf Ceder (Sweden) Daniel Larsson
18-20 August	2017 Melbourne Darts Masters Melbourne, Australia	(England) Phil Taylor	(Scotland) Peter Wright	(Australia) Simon Whitlock (Northern Ireland) Daryl Gurney	(Australia) Corey Cadby (England) Michael Smith (England) James Wade (Scotland) Gary Anderson
25-27 August	2017 Perth Darts Masters Perth, Australia	(Scotland) Gary Anderson	(Netherlands) Raymond van Barneveld	(England) James Wade (Northern Ireland) Daryl Gurney	(Australia) Simon Whitlock (England) Michael Smith (England) Phil Taylor (Scotland) Peter Wright
25 August	2017 European Tour 9 - East European Qualifier; Budapest, Hungary	Does not apply.			
26 August	2017 European Tour 10 - East European Qualifier; Budapest, Hungary	Does not apply.			
26 August	2017 European Tour 11 - East European Qualifier; Budapest, Hungary	Does not apply.			
27 August	2017 European Tour 12 - East European Qualifier; Budapest, Hungary	Does not apply.			
31 August	2017 European Tour 9 - West/South European Qualifier; Maastricht, Netherlands	Does not apply.			
31 August	2017 European Tour 9 - Home Nation Qualifier; Maastricht, Netherlands	Does not apply.			
31 August	2017 European Tour 10 - West/South European Qualifier; Maastricht, Netherlands	Does not apply.			

== September ==
Date	Tournament	Champions	Runners-up	Semifinalists	Quarterfinalists
1-3 September	2017 European Tour 9 Maastricht, Netherlands	(Netherlands) Michael van Gerwen	(England) Steve Beaton	(England) Michael Smith (Scotland) Peter Wright	(Northern Ireland) Daryl Gurney (Wales) Robert Owen (Poland) Krzysztof Ratajski (Scotland) John Henderson
7 September	2017 European Tour 10 - Home Nation Qualifier; Mannheim, Germany	Does not apply.			
8-10 September	2017 European Tour 10 Mannheim, Germany	(Netherlands) Michael van Gerwen	(England) Rob Cross	(Netherlands) Benito van de Pas (Australia) Simon Whitlock	(England) Ian White (Netherlands) Vincent van der Voort (England) Michael Smith (Netherlands) Jelle Klaasen
9 September	2017 Challenge Tour 17 Wigan, England	(England) Peter Jacques	(England) Wayne Jones	(England) Adam Smith-Neale (England) Adam Huckvale	(Austria) Rusty-Jake Rodriguez (Netherlands) Arjan Konterman (England) Paul Phillips (England) Ian Withers
9 September	2017 Challenge Tour 18 Wigan, England	(England) Nick Fullwell	(England) Kevin Edwards	(England) Jay Foreman (England) Wayne Jones	(Republic of Ireland) Francis Carragher (England) Matthew Edgar (England) Mark Dudbridge (England) Lee Evans
10 September	2017 Challenge Tour 19 Wigan, England	(England) Wayne Jones	(England) Stuart Kellett	(England) Peter Hudson (Scotland) Gary Stone	(England) Paul Phillips (England) Martin Lukeman (England) Sam Head (Wales) Craig Gilchrist
10 September	2017 Challenge Tour 20 Wigan, England	(England) Alan Tabern	(England) Adam Smith-Neale	(Brazil) Diogo Portela (England) Luke Humphries	(England) Barry Lynn (England) Kevin Edwards (England) Martin Lukeman (South Africa) Warrick Scheffer
16-17 September	2017 Champions League of Darts Cardiff, Wales	(Austria) Mensur Suljović	(Scotland) Gary Anderson	(England) Phil Taylor (Netherlands) Raymond van Barneveld	(Netherlands) Michael van Gerwen (England) Adrian Lewis (Scotland) Peter Wright (England) Dave Chisnall
16 September	2017 Development Tour 13 Barnsley, England	(Belgium) Dimitri Van den Bergh	(Wales) Rhys Griffin	(England) Harry Ward (England) Adam Hunt	(England) Lee Budgen (England) Luke Humphries (England) Jarred Cole (England) Justin Smith
16 September	2017 Development Tour 14 Barnsley, England	(Netherlands) Mike van Duivenbode	(Belgium) Dimitri Van den Bergh	(Germany) Christian Bunse (Austria) Rowby-John Rodriguez	(England) Adam Hunt (Netherlands) Berry van Peer (Netherlands) Sven Groen (Netherlands) Justin van Tergouw
17 September	2017 Development Tour 15 Barnsley, England	(Germany) Martin Schindler	(Netherlands) Justin van Tergouw	(England) Harry Ward (Germany) Nico Ziemann	(England) Luke Humphries (England) Ronnie Roberts (Canada) Dawson Murschell (Republic of Ireland) Steve Lennon
17 September	2017 Development Tour 16 Barnsley, England	(England) Luke Humphries	(England) Ryan Meikle	(Belgium) Dimitri Van den Bergh (Republic of Ireland) Steve Lennon	(England) Adam Hunt (England) Dan Read (Austria) Rusty-Jake Rodriguez (England) Harry Ward
21 September	2017 European Tour 11 - West/South European Qualifier; Riesa, Germany	Does not apply.			
21 September	2017 European Tour 11 - Home Nation Qualifier; Riesa, Germany	Does not apply.			
21 September	2017 European Tour 12 - West/South European Qualifier; Riesa, Germany	Does not apply.			
22-24 September	2017 European Tour 11 Riesa, Germany	(Scotland) Peter Wright	(Belgium) Kim Huybrechts	(Netherlands) Ron Meulenkamp (England) Joe Cullen	(Netherlands) Jelle Klaasen (Sweden) Dennis Nilsson (Wales) Gerwyn Price (Australia) Simon Whitlock
28 September	2017 European Tour 12 - UK Qualifier; Dublin, Ireland	Does not apply.			
29 September	2017 Players Championship 19 Dublin, Ireland	(England) Rob Cross	(Scotland) Peter Wright	(Spain) Antonio Alcinas (Austria) Mensur Suljović	(England) Andrew Gilding (Republic of Ireland) Steve Lennon (Netherlands) Vincent van der Voort (Netherlands) Jimmy Hendriks
30 September	2017 Players Championship 20 Dublin, Ireland	(Austria) Mensur Suljović	(England) Stephen Bunting	(Latvia) Madars Razma (England) James Wilson	(Wales) Gerwyn Price (Netherlands) Vincent van der Voort (Netherlands) Michael van Gerwen (Scotland) John Henderson

== October ==
Date	Tournament	Champions	Runners-up	Semifinalists	Quarterfinalists
1-7 October	2017 World Grand Prix Dublin, Ireland	(Northern Ireland) Daryl Gurney	(Australia) Simon Whitlock	(Scotland) John Henderson (Austria) Mensur Suljović	(Netherlands) Raymond van Barneveld (Scotland) Robert Thornton (Netherlands) Benito van de Pas (Scotland) Peter Wright
9 October	2017 World Series Finals Qualifier; Barnsley, England	Does not apply.			
10 October	2017 Players Championship 21 Barnsley, England	(England) Rob Cross	(England) Adrian Lewis	(Republic of Ireland) William O'Connor (Netherlands) Jermaine Wattimena	(Scotland) Peter Wright (England) Keegan Brown (England) Michael Smith (Wales) Gerwyn Price
11 October	2017 Players Championship 22 Barnsley, England	(Wales) Jonny Clayton	(England) James Wilson	(England) Jamie Caven (Netherlands) Jeffrey de Zwaan	(Netherlands) Ron Meulenkamp (Scotland) John Henderson (England) Richard North (Spain) Antonio Alcinas
12 October	2017 European Tour 12 - Home Nation Qualifier; Göttingen, Germany	Does not apply.			
13-15 October	2017 European Tour 12 Göttingen, Germany	(Netherlands) Michael van Gerwen	(England) Rob Cross	(Australia) Simon Whitlock (Belgium) Kim Huybrechts	(England) Joe Cullen (England) Andy Boulton (England) Dave Chisnall (England) Michael Smith
20-21 October	2017 German Darts Masters Düsseldorf, Germany	(Scotland) Peter Wright	(England) Phil Taylor	(Netherlands) Raymond van Barneveld (England) James Wade	(Scotland) Gary Anderson (Austria) Mensur Suljović (Netherlands) Michael van Gerwen (Northern Ireland) Daryl Gurney
26-29 October	2017 European Championship Hasselt, Belgium	(Netherlands) Michael van Gerwen	(England) Rob Cross	(Australia) Kyle Anderson (Northern Ireland) Daryl Gurney	(Australia) Simon Whitlock (Austria) Mensur Suljović (Scotland) Peter Wright (England) Michael Smith

== November ==
Date	Tournament	Champions	Runners-up	Semifinalists	Quarterfinalists
3-5 November	2017 World Series of Darts Finals Glasgow, Scotland	(Netherlands) Michael van Gerwen	(Scotland) Gary Anderson	(England) James Wade (Northern Ireland) Daryl Gurney	(Wales) Gerwyn Price (Belgium) Dimitri Van den Bergh (England) Rob Cross (Scotland) Peter Wright
4 November	2017 Development Tour 17 Wigan, England	(Belgium) Mike De Decker	(Wales) Kurt Parry	(England) Adam Hunt (Netherlands) Justin van Tergouw	(Republic of Ireland) Steve Lennon (England) Rhys Hayden (Wales) Rhys Griffin (Netherlands) Geert Nentjes
4 November	2017 Development Tour 18 Wigan, England	(England) Ted Evetts	(Austria) Rowby-John Rodriguez	(Wales) Kurt Parry (England) Reece Colley	(Belgium) Mike De Decker (England) Josh Payne (England) Harry Ward (England) Rhys Hayden
4 November	2017 Nordic & Baltic Tour 9 Riga, Latvia	(Finland) Kim Viljanen	(Finland) Marko Kantele	(Lithuania) Darius Labanauskas (Finland) Ulf Ceder	(Latvia) Madars Razma (Sweden) Magnus Caris (Denmark) Henrik Primdal (Sweden) Dennis Nilsson
5 November	2017 Development Tour 19 Wigan, England	(Austria) Rowby-John Rodriguez	(England) Luke Humphries	(Canada) Dawson Murschell (England) Scott Dale	(Germany) Martin Schindler (Austria) Rusty-Jake Rodriguez (Belgium) Brian Raman (Republic of Ireland) Steve Lennon
5 November	2017 Development Tour 20 Wigan, England	(England) Luke Humphries	(England) Jake Jones	(Belgium) Mike De Decker (England) Ted Evetts	(Netherlands) Kevin de Vries (Netherlands) Mike van Duivenbode (England) Adam Hunt (Netherlands) Wessel Nijman
5 November	2017 Nordic & Baltic Tour 10 Riga, Latvia	(Finland) Kim Viljanen	(Finland) Ulf Ceder	(Sweden) Magnus Caris (Latvia) Madars Razma	(Finland) Marko Kantele (Lithuania) Darius Labanauskas (Norway) Cor Dekker (Sweden) Dennis Nilsson
6 November	2017 Grand Slam of Darts - PDC Qualifier; Wigan, England	Does not apply.			
11-19 November	2017 Grand Slam of Darts Wolverhampton, England	(Netherlands) Michael van Gerwen	(Scotland) Peter Wright	(England) Phil Taylor (Scotland) Gary Anderson	(England) Rob Cross (Northern Ireland) Daryl Gurney (England) Glen Durrant (Austria) Mensur Suljović
24-26 November	2017 Players Championship Finals Minehead, England	(Netherlands) Michael van Gerwen	(Wales) Jonny Clayton	(England) Rob Cross (England) Justin Pipe	(England) James Wade (England) Steve Beaton (Northern Ireland) Daryl Gurney (Netherlands) Jan Dekker
6 and 26 November	2017 World Youth Championship Minehead, England	(Belgium) Dimitri Van den Bergh	(England) Josh Payne	(Australia) Corey Cadby (England) Luke Humphries	(Netherlands) Jeffrey de Zwaan (Belgium) Kenny Neyens (Germany) Martin Schindler (England) Ted Evetts
27 November	2018 World Championship - PDPA Qualifier; Milton Keynes, England	Does not apply.			

== December ==
Date	Tournament	Champions	Runners-up	Semifinalists	Quarterfinalists
14 December–1 January	2018 World Championship London, England	(England) Rob Cross	(England) Phil Taylor	(Netherlands) Michael van Gerwen (Wales) Jamie Lewis	(Netherlands) Raymond van Barneveld (Belgium) Dimitri Van den Bergh (England) Darren Webster (Scotland) Gary Anderson

== See also ==
- List of players with a 2017 PDC Tour Card
- 2017 PDC Pro Tour
