= Exeter Arena =

Sports venue in Exeter, England

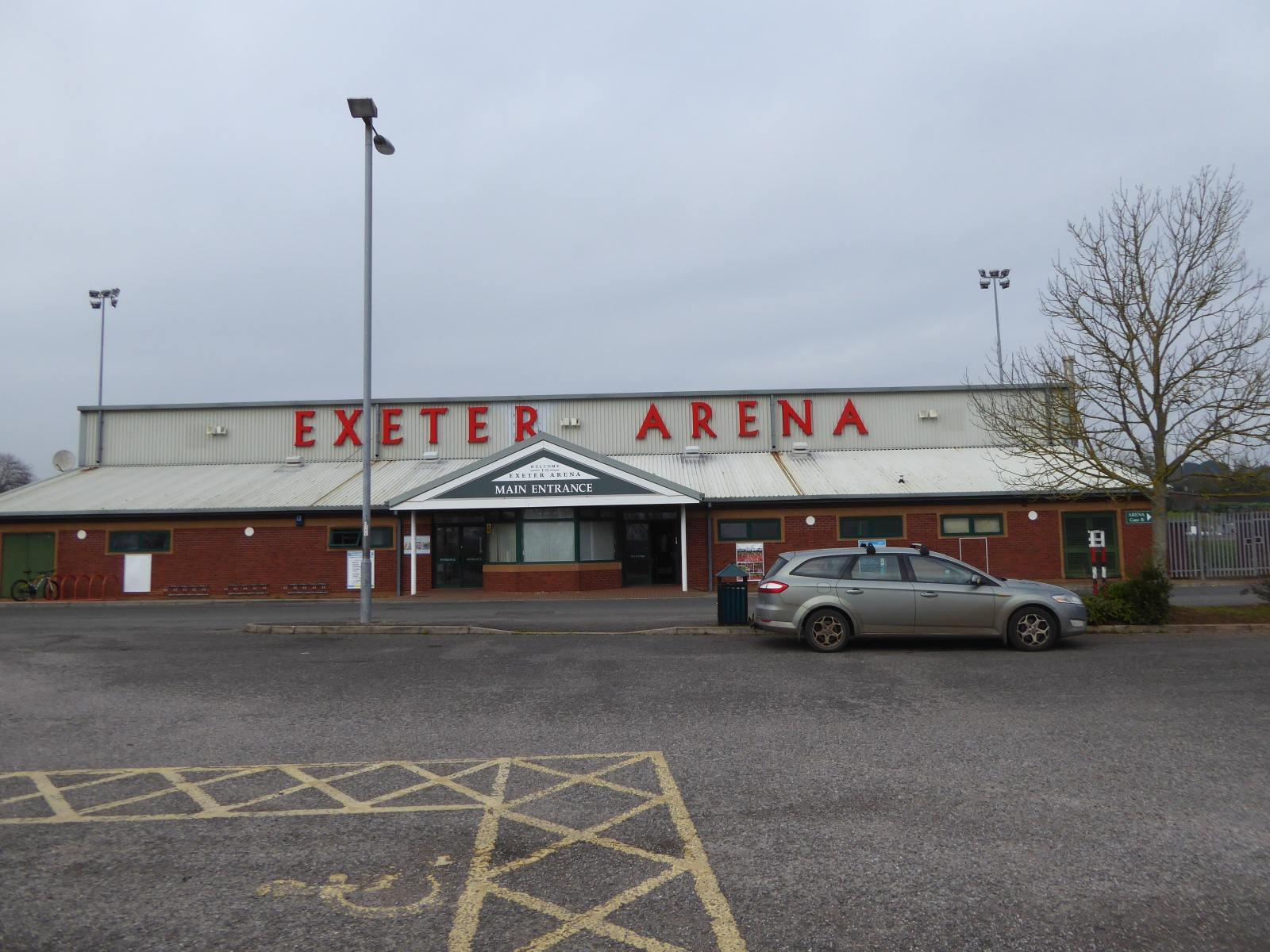
- Entrance to Exeter Arena
- Interactive map of Exeter Arena
- Former names: Exhibition Fields
- Address: Exeter; United Kingdom
- Coordinates: 50.7368°N 3.4912°W
- Owner: Exeter City Council
- Operator: Exeter Leisure

Website
- www.exeterleisure.com/centres/exeter-arena/

Exeter Arena, formerly known as the Exhibition Fields, is an outdoor sports complex at Whipton Barton in Exeter, Devon.

== History ==
=== Early agricultural exhibitions ===
The land was part of the Whipton Barton farm estate, which was itself a tenant farm of the Poltimore Estate, seat of the Bampfylde family, with the Rewe (spelt Rew in some reports) family being tenants of Whipton Barton for over 300 years.

Rewe used the 'exhibition fields' in 1850, as the location for the Royal Show of the Royal Agricultural Society of England, where it was described as having "a deep, red loamy surface soil, with gravelly base".

Following a change of tenancy, in the early 1900s, the fields to the North of the Barton continued to be used for agricultural shows (possibly the same fields used for the RASE show in the 1850s).

In 1909, the 21 acre plot was sold by auction to a local surveyor, Mr JA Lucas, for £6,000.

Shortly after this sale in 1909, the Bath and West Show was held on the site.

In 1911, the Daily Mail Circuit of Britain air race had a leg held on Whipton Barton land, using the 'exhibition fields', where competitors came in to land during the 4th Stage from Bristol to Brighton, with special trains bringing spectators from Exeter to Whipton Bridge Halt railway station as early as 2.30 in the morning.

=== Sale to Exeter City Council ===
Shortly after World War 2, the Alford sold the exhibition fields to Exeter City Council, becoming Whipton playing fields.

The peripatetic Bath and West Show returned to exhibition fields in 1954, and the following year in 1955, the land became the permanent home to the previously peripatetic Devon county show.

=== Redevelopment as Exeter Arena ===
In 1989, after more than 30 years, the county show moved to its new permanent home at Westpoint Arena at Clyst St Mary.

The council then redeveloped the exhibition fields as Exeter Arena.

== Facilities ==
The arena has a track and field arena, with a 400m eight lane running track, as well as field event areas marked out.

The Rugby Union club Exeter Saracens RFC also have their clubhouse and playing fields at Exhibition Fields.
