= Devon County Show =

Agricultural festival in Devon, England

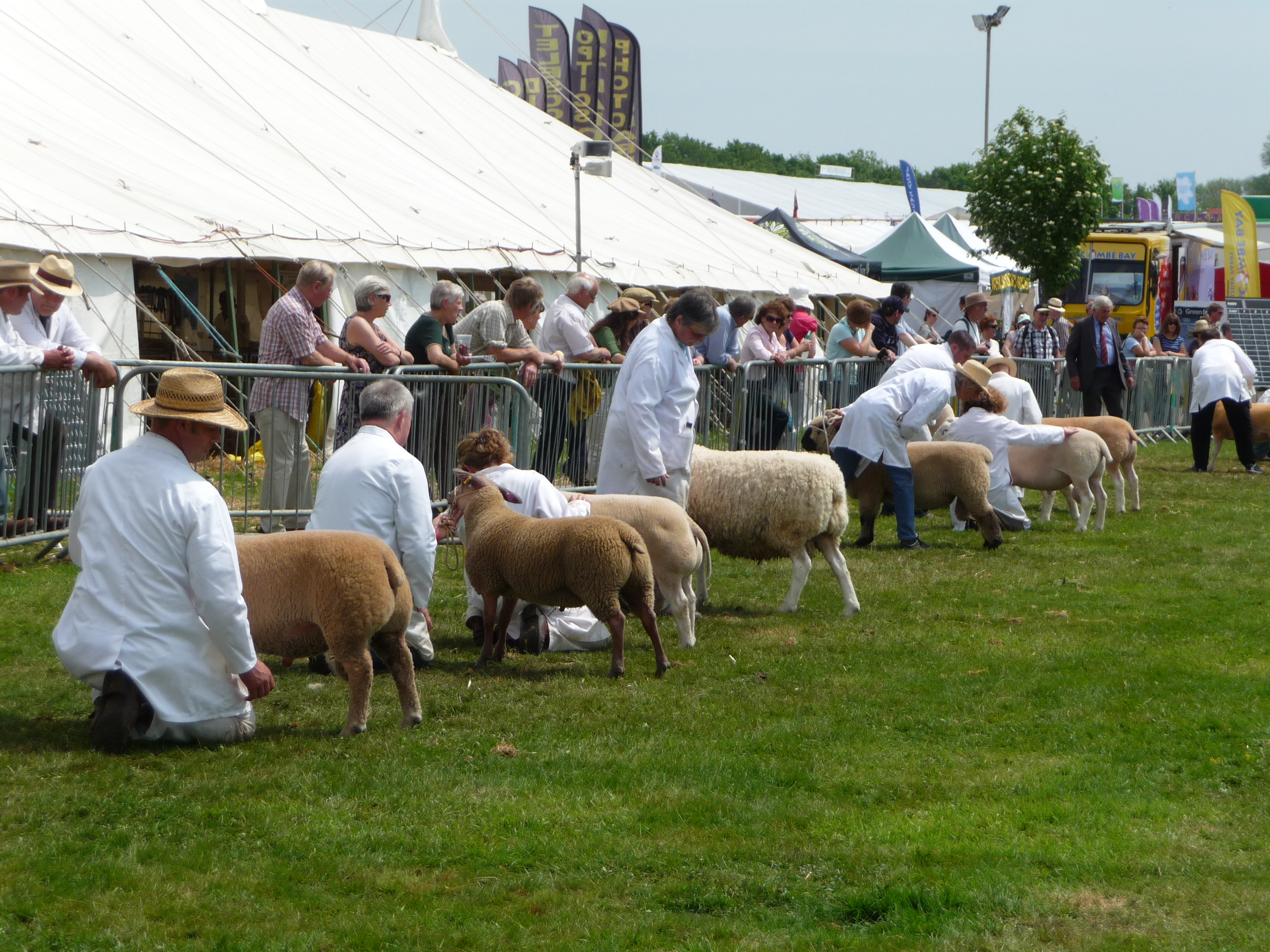
- Sheep judging at the 2010 show
- Status: Active
- Genre: Agricultural show
- Frequency: Annually, 3rd week of May
- Venue: Westpoint Arena
- Locations: Clyst St Mary, near Exeter
- Country: UK
- Inaugurated: May 1872
- Organiser: Devon County Agricultural Association
- Member: Association of Show and Agricultural Organisations
- Website: devoncountyshow.co.uk

The Devon County Show is an agricultural show held annually from Thursday to Saturday in the third week of May at the Westpoint Arena and Showground in Clyst St Mary near Exeter. It is one of a number of county shows in the United Kingdom. The show is a celebration of rural life in Devon, and features country and livestock competitions, a grand parade, equine events, local food and local drink, traditional entertainment and rural crafts.

== History ==
The show goes back to 1872, when the Devon County Agricultural Association was formed to undertake promotion of the Devon County Show. It has been held annually ever since, except for breaks during the two World Wars from 1940 to 1946 and 1915 to 1919, eleven occasions between 1890 and 1958, when it was held in conjunction with Bath and West Show or the Royal Show when these were held in Devon, and 2020.

The show was first held at Victoria Park, Mount Radford and then at various sites around the county until 1956, when it moved to its first permanent site on the Exhibition Fields at Whipton Barton, Exeter (now Exeter Arena).

The show moved to its present site at the Westpoint Arena in 1990.

== The show ==
The Devon County Show comes from a time when agriculture was the most important part of the local economy. It attracts livestock exhibitors from across the country as well as features competitions for young farmers, traditional rural skills, show jumping, horticulture, dairy products, honey, poultry and crafts. There are numerous trade stands, demonstrations, displays in the ring and a funfair. In 2016, some 90,000 visitors attended the show during the three days it lasted.

Students from Bicton College, a specialist agricultural college at Budleigh Salterton, act as stewards, help set up the showground and keep the livestock areas in order. In 2016 they also demonstrated equine skills, gave chainsaw demonstrations, exhibited animals, rebuilt tractors, participated in a cycling challenge and exhibited their art and craft portfolios.
