= Whipton Barton =

Coordinates: 50.7318°N 3.4911°W

Whipton Barton was an estate farm to the East of Exeter. The 'Barton' suffix is the traditional Devon wording for the manor house, and indicates a demesne in the feudal system.

Whilst the house and farm no longer exist, they have given their name to an area of Exeter.

== History ==
=== Estate farm ===
Whipton Barton was for hundreds of years, a tenant farm of the Poltimore Estate, seat of the Bampfylde family, with the Rewe (spelt Rew in some reports) family being tenants for over 300 years.

In 1850, the Whipton Barton farm was the location for the Royal Show of the Royal Agricultural Society of England, where it was described as having "a deep, red loamy surface soil, with gravelly base".

In 1859, land from Whipton Barton was set aside for the building of a chapel of rest to serve the local area.

During the coming of age ceremony in 1880 for his son, the then Lord Poltimore talked of the generations of the Rewe family who had been tenants of Whipton Barton, and expressed his wish that there would always be a Rewe at Whipton Barton, and a Bampfylde at Poltimore.

In the event, despite the long connection with the estate, the Rewes faced a declining business, and auctioned their livestock, equipment, and house furnishings in a series of auctions, winding the Barton down during 1886. The farm was clearly a mixed farm, with auction lots including corn, sheep, cows, and horses.

The end of the Rewes' association with the farm also meant that farm laborers were evicted from their tied housing, causing one of them to hang himself in 1901, in his bed at the cottage.

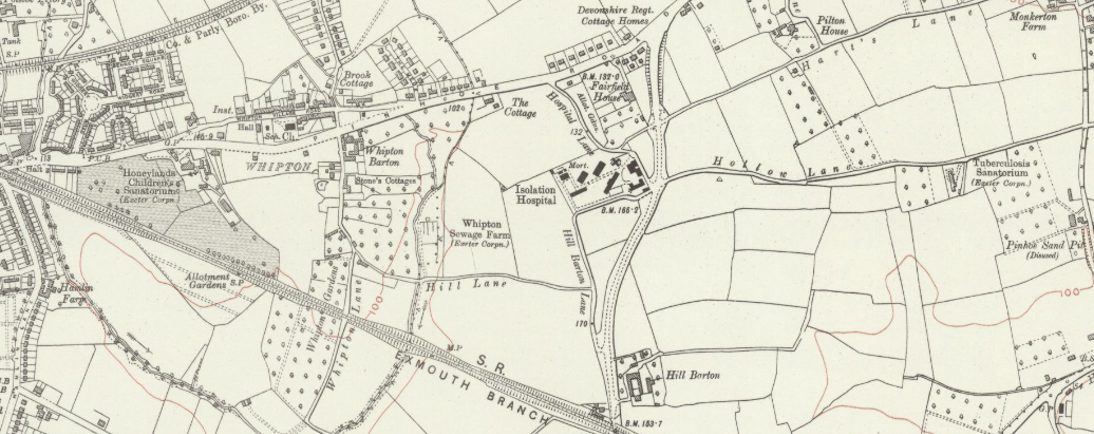
1932 Ordnance Survey map showing Whipton Barton centre left, on the junction of the Pinhoe Road and Whipton Lane (now Hill Lane)

When the Rewes finally vacated in 1901, the farm was bought by Albert George Alford, and the family continued to operate the farm until his death in 1942.

=== Exhibition fields ===
Alford allowed fields to the North of the Barton to be used for agricultural shows (possibly the same fields used for the RASE show in the 1850s). One such show was the Bath and West Show, which used the exhibition fields in 1909.

In 1911, the Daily Mail Circuit of Britain air race had a leg held on Whipton Barton land, using the 'exhibition fields', where competitors came in to land during the 4th Stage from Bristol to Brighton, with special trains bringing spectators from Exeter to Whipton Bridge Halt railway station as early as 2.30 in the morning.

Shortly after World War 2, the Alford sold the exhibition fields to Exeter City Council, becoming Whipton playing fields.

The peripetetic Bath and West Show returned to exhibition fields in 1954, and the following year in 1955, the land became the permanent home to the previously peripatetic Devon county show.

In 1989, after more than 30 years, the county show moved to its new permanent home at Westpoint Arena at Clyst St Mary.

The council then redeveloped the exhibition fields as Exeter Arena.

=== Later uses ===
The actual manor house was demolished in 1963 and in its place a sheltered accommodation building "Whipton Barton House" was constructed, which was in turn demolished in 2020, and as of 2022 is due to be rebuilt as "The Gardens", which will be passivhaus affordable homes.

In 1956, a new school was built on some of the estate land, just West of the actual manor house, and it is named Whipton Barton School.

In 1967, Rennes House, a residential tower block, was built on the former site of the estate.
