= Bishop's Clyst =

Coordinates: 50.714°N 3.444°W

Bishop's Clyst was an ancient manor in Devon, England. The name is also used for the grouped parish council which covers the two civil parishes of Clyst St Mary and Sowton.

== History ==
Bishop's Clist or Clists-Bishops was a manor in the parish of Faringdon held by the de Sachville family and later mortgaged by them to Walter Branscombe (d.1280), Bishop of Exeter. It was later granted by Bishop John Vesey (d.1554) to John Russell, 1st Earl of Bedford.

The manor contained Bishop's Court, the medieval palace of the bishops of Exeter.

Bishop's Clyst Parish Council was formed in 1976 as a grouped parish council to serve the two civil parishes of Clyst St Mary and Sowton. These are two separate settlements Sowton being a mile or so north of Clyst St Mary. The parish council has an office at Clyst St Mary Village Hall and meets both there and at Sowton Village Hall.
