= Rennes House =

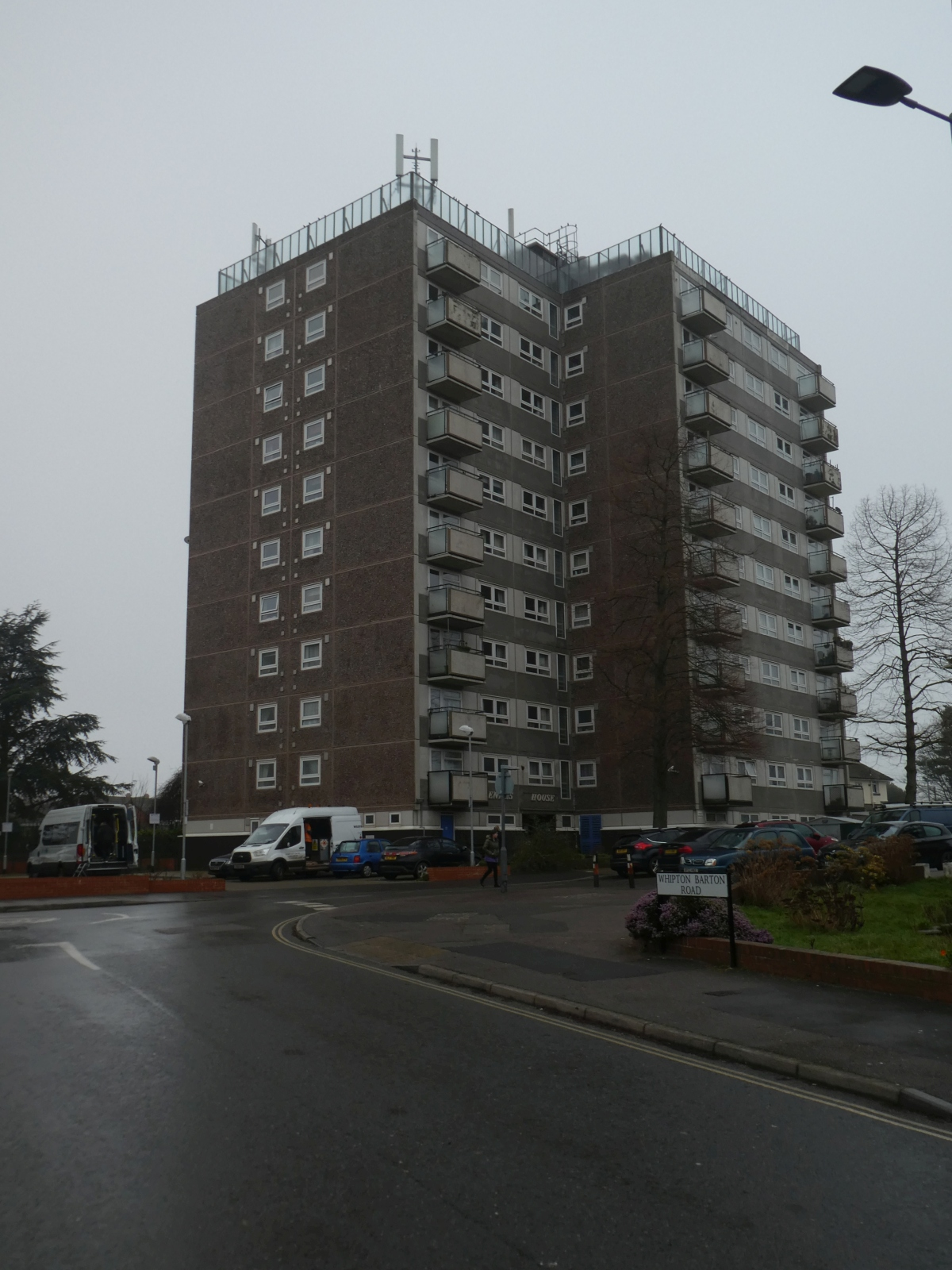
- Rennes House in 2020

General information
- Status: Being demolished
- Type: Tower block
- Architectural style: Brutalism
- Location: Whipton, Exeter
- Coordinates: 50°43′51.049″N 3°29′28.316″W
- Named for: Rennes
- Construction started: 1966
- Completed: 1968
- Demolished: 7 September 2026 – present
- Owner: Exeter City Council

Height
- Architectural: 106.63ft

Technical details
- Structural system: Large-panel-system
- Floor count: 11

Design and construction
- Architect: Fitzroy Robinson & Partners
- Main contractor: Sleeman

Other information
- Public transit: Rennes House

Rennes House is a defunct tower block in Whipton, a small area of Exeter, England. It is one of the tallest buildings in Exeter. Work to demolish it began in September 2026.

== Name ==
The block is named after Rennes, a city in France, which Exeter is twinned with.

== History ==
=== Construction ===
The block, then known as Whipton Barton Farm phase 2, began construction in 1966, being designed by Fitzroy Robinson & Partners, which is elsewhere acclaimed for similarly designed buildings such as 102 Petty France. It was built by the borough council that preceded Exeter City Council, Exeter Borough Council, and Sleemans. It was constructed using a large-panel-system (LPS) method from France, where panels were cast on the construction site.

The building was to be built to a height of 11 stories, much shorter than many other LPS buildings across the country, which often exceeded 20.

Its construction faced many issues, including that its foundations began to crack at heights greater than that of a conventional low-rise apartment block. Other issues faced include that “The builders imported the crane from France but British builders were still using imperial so the crane didn’t fit the rails and it had to be re drilled”.

Despite contemporary opinions, a 1968 report close to its completion by the Exeter City Architect said that “the final appearance of the building is most pleasing and in my opinion a step forward from the usual general characteristics of tall housing units.”

=== In use ===
However, a few months after the aforementioned report, the similar London block Ronan Point suffered a partial collapse due to a gas explosion, which led to a loss in interest in such residential blocks, which also effected Exeter.

Within a year, residents moved into the block, which was built as housing for older people.

The Mayor of Rennes visited during “Rennes Week in Exeter 1969”, albeit the actual time of “Rennes Week” is unknown.

In the 1980s, the window frames of the building were replaced.

In 1992, the heating was upgraded to storage heaters and the asbestos tiling was removed. The issues with water penetration — a known issue in LPS buildings — were not fixed.

In 2016, the council carried out a study for the feasibility of refurbishing the building, with proposals that included adding external wall insulation, refurbishing the lifts, remodelling the entrance and ground floor and removing the remaining asbestos. The council did decide to go ahead with refurbishments with a deadline of 2019, however these did not occur.

=== Closure ===
In 2017, Grenfell Tower, which was similarly built to Rennes House, suffered a devastating fire, killing over 70. The Government required all local authorities take risk-assessments for all their large-panel-system tower blocks. Exeter City Council carried one out on Rennes House, its only applicable building, but found that no repairs were required and that the tower was safe.

An options paper commissioned in 2022 by the council which found that the costs of the planned refurbishment were increasing and that “management of high-rise blocks is becoming increasing complex”. The rest of the estate had been previously demolished in the decade, to be replaced by new buildings. With the additional fear of a situation similar to Ronan Point or Grenfell Tower and pressure from the fire service to refurbish or vacate it, the council decided to demolish it and provide new housing for its tenants, evicting the last tenants between July and November 2024. The council had begun stripping it out in December that year.

It was initially due to be demolished in Spring 2025, however that deadline was missed. Demolition works began on 7 September 2026 in order to prepare the Whipton Gardens estate for two new low-rise council apartment blocks, estimated to take roughly 32 weeks to complete, at a cost of over £1 million.
