= 2017 Premier League Darts =

Darts competition

2017 Betway Premier League Darts

Tournament information
- Dates: 2 February–18 May 2017
- Nine-dart finish: Adrian Lewis

Champion(s)
- Michael van Gerwen (NED)

The 2017 Betway Premier League Darts was a darts tournament organised by the Professional Darts Corporation – the thirteenth edition of the tournament. The event began on Thursday 2 February at the Newcastle Arena in Newcastle upon Tyne and ended with the Play-offs at The O2 Arena in London on Thursday 18 May. This was the fourth year that the tournament was sponsored by Betway.

Michael van Gerwen, the 2016 champion, retained his title by winning the last-leg decider against Peter Wright in the final, after Wright missed six darts to win 11–9. Kim Huybrechts became the first player in Premier League Darts history to fail to win a match in the tournament.

== Format ==
The tournament format is identical to that since 2013. During the first nine weeks (Phase 1) each player plays the other nine players once. The bottom two players are then eliminated from the competition. In the next six weeks (phase 2) each player plays the other seven players once. Phase 2 consists of four weeks where five matches are played followed by two weeks where four matches are played. At the end of phase 2 the top four players contest the two semi-finals and the final in the play-off week.

== Venues ==
In the only change from 2016, Brighton returned to the calendar, replacing Bournemouth.

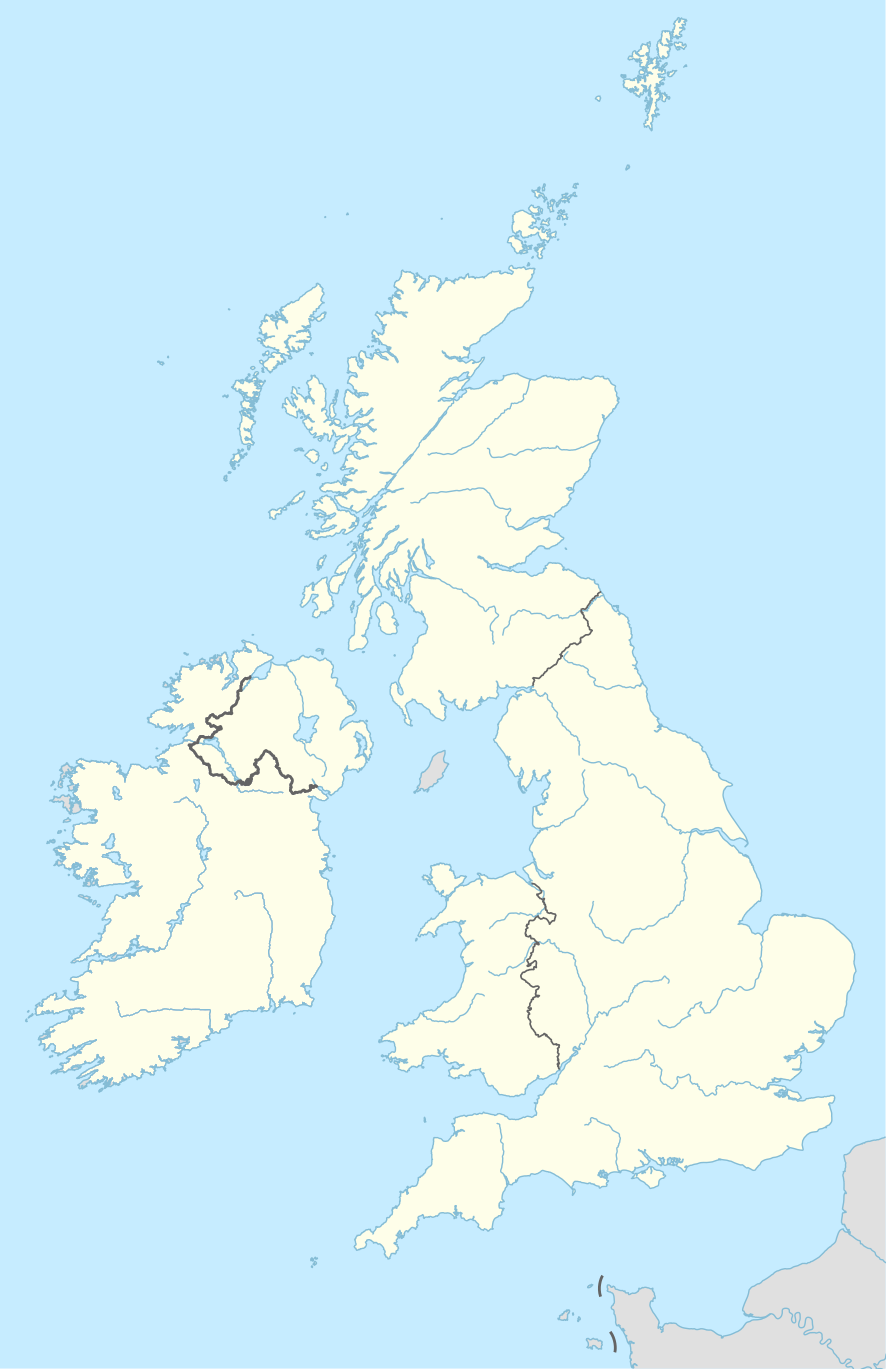
Locations of the 2017 Premier League venues in the British Isles
Locations of the 2017 Premier League venues in the Netherlands

(England) Newcastle	(England) Nottingham	(England) Leeds	(England) Brighton
Newcastle Arena; Thursday 2 February	Nottingham Arena; Thursday 9 February	Leeds Arena; Thursday 16 February	Brighton Centre; Thursday 23 February
(England) Exeter	(Scotland) Glasgow	(Netherlands) Rotterdam	(England) Manchester
Westpoint Exeter; Thursday 2 March	The SSE Hydro; Thursday 9 March	Rotterdam Ahoy; Thursday 16 March	Manchester Arena; Thursday 23 March
(Wales) Cardiff	(Republic of Ireland) Dublin	(England) Liverpool	(Northern Ireland) Belfast
Cardiff International Arena; Thursday 30 March	3Arena; Thursday 6 April	Liverpool Arena; Thursday 13 April	SSE Arena Belfast; Thursday 20 April
(England) Birmingham	(England) Sheffield	(Scotland) Aberdeen	(England) London
Arena Birmingham; Thursday 27 April	Sheffield Arena; Thursday 4 May	AECC; Thursday 11 May	The O_{2} Thursday 18 May

== Players ==
The players in this year's tournament were announced following the 2017 PDC World Darts Championship final on 2 January 2017, with the top four of the PDC Order of Merit joined by six Wildcards – two chosen by Sky Sports and four by the PDC.

Previous PDC wildcards Robert Thornton and Michael Smith were dropped in favour of Jelle Klaasen and Kim Huybrechts. The 2017 edition marks the first time in which the six-time champion Phil Taylor appears as a wildcard entry, having finished outside the Order of Merit places. It is also the first Premier League without a player making his debut in the competition.

Player	Appearance in Premier League	Consecutive Streak	Order of Merit Rank	Previous best performance	Qualification
(Netherlands) Michael van Gerwen	5th	5	1	Winner (2013, 2016)	PDC Order of Merit
(Scotland) Gary Anderson	7th	7	2	Winner (2011, 2015)	PDC Order of Merit
(Scotland) Peter Wright	4th	4	3	5th (2014, 2016)	PDC Order of Merit
(England) Adrian Lewis	10th	8	4	Runner-up (2011)	PDC Order of Merit
(England) James Wade	9th	3	5	Winner (2009)	PDC Wildcard
(England) Phil Taylor	13th	13	6	Winner (2005–2008, 2010, 2012)	Sky Sports Wildcard
(England) Dave Chisnall	4th	4	7	Semi-finals (2015)	PDC Wildcard
(Netherlands) Jelle Klaasen	2nd	1	9	7th (2009)	PDC Wildcard
(Netherlands) Raymond van Barneveld	12th	12	10	Winner (2014)	Sky Sports Wildcard
(Belgium) Kim Huybrechts	2nd	1	13	10th (2015)	PDC Wildcard

== Prize money ==
The prize-money was increased to £825,000 from £725,000 in 2016.

Stage	Prize money
Winner	£250,000
Runner-up	£120,000
Semi-finalists	£80,000
5th place	£65,000
6th place	£55,000
7th place	£50,000
8th place	£45,000
9th place	£30,000
10th place	£25,000
League Winner Bonus	£25,000
Total	£825,000

== League stage ==
=== 2 February – Week 1 (Phase 1) ===
(England) Newcastle Arena, Newcastle

	Score	
Kim Huybrechts (Belgium); 100.62	5–7	(England) James Wade; 96.07
Raymond van Barneveld (Netherlands); 99.33	7–5	(England) Adrian Lewis; 98.96
Phil Taylor (England); 96.23	7–3	(England) Dave Chisnall; 96.84
Gary Anderson (Scotland); 103.19	6–6	(Netherlands) Michael van Gerwen; 107.94
Peter Wright (Scotland); 93.93	7–4	(Netherlands) Jelle Klaasen; 95.94
Night's Total Average: 98.90
Highest Checkout: (England) Dave Chisnall 160
Most 180s: (England) Dave Chisnall 5
Night's 180s: 29

=== 9 February – Week 2 (Phase 1) ===
(England) Nottingham Arena, Nottingham

	Score	
Adrian Lewis (England); 94.40	7–2	(England) Dave Chisnall; 90.48
James Wade (England); 98.88	6–6	(England) Phil Taylor; 92.07
Jelle Klaasen (Netherlands); 97.41	3–7	(Scotland) Gary Anderson; 100.04
Peter Wright (Scotland); 89.83	3–7	(Netherlands) Michael van Gerwen; 105.21
Kim Huybrechts (Belgium); 96.99	6–6	(Netherlands) Raymond van Barneveld; 93.91
Night's Total Average: 95.92
Highest Checkout: (Netherlands) Michael van Gerwen 170
Most 180s: (Netherlands) Raymond van Barneveld 7
Night's 180s: 29

=== 16 February – Week 3 (Phase 1) ===
(England) Leeds Arena, Leeds

	Score	
Gary Anderson (Scotland); 106.59	5–7	(Scotland) Peter Wright; 109.48
Adrian Lewis (England); 88.01	4–7	(England) James Wade; 98.21
Phil Taylor (England); 96.39	7–4	(Netherlands) Raymond van Barneveld; 97.32
Michael van Gerwen (Netherlands); 102.78	7–4	(Netherlands) Jelle Klaasen; 96.24
Dave Chisnall (England); 101.20	7–4	(Belgium) Kim Huybrechts; 105.06
Night's Total Average: 99.13
Highest Checkout: (England) Dave Chisnall 141
Most 180s: (Scotland) Gary Anderson 6
Night's 180s: 32

=== 23 February – Week 4 (Phase 1) ===
(England) Brighton Centre, Brighton

	Score	
Dave Chisnall (England); 93.28	3–7	(Netherlands) Jelle Klaasen; 98.90
Michael van Gerwen (Netherlands); 104.67	6–6	(England) Adrian Lewis; 101.20
Gary Anderson (Scotland); 96.80	6–6	(England) James Wade; 89.61
Phil Taylor (England); 96.44	6–6	(Belgium) Kim Huybrechts; 94.56
Raymond van Barneveld (Netherlands); 103.40	6–6	(Scotland) Peter Wright; 95.87
Night's Total Average: 97.47
Highest Checkout: (England) Adrian Lewis 170
Most 180s: (Netherlands) Jelle Klaasen, (Netherlands) Raymond van Barneveld & (Netherlands) Michael van Gerwen 4
Night's 180s: 24

=== 2 March – Week 5 (Phase 1) ===
(England) Westpoint Exeter, Exeter

	Score	
Dave Chisnall (England); 101.13	7–2	(Netherlands) Raymond van Barneveld; 96.83
Jelle Klaasen (Netherlands); 87.57	6–6	(Belgium) Kim Huybrechts; 93.96
Gary Anderson (Scotland); 105.31	6–6	(England) Phil Taylor; 103.98
Adrian Lewis (England); 109.15	2–7	(Scotland) Peter Wright; 119.50
James Wade (England); 89.35	5–7	(England) Dave Chisnall*; 92.58
Night's Total Average: 99.94
Highest Checkout: (Scotland) Peter Wright 125
Most 180s: (England) Dave Chisnall 10
Night's 180s: 39

*Michael van Gerwen was originally scheduled to play against James Wade, but withdrew due to a back injury, Dave Chisnall played twice in Round 5. Van Gerwen played Wade on 23 March (Round 8), giving Chisnall the night off.

=== 9 March – Week 6 (Phase 1) ===
(Scotland) The SSE Hydro, Glasgow

	Score	
Adrian Lewis (England); 98.71	7–4	(England) Phil Taylor; 96.82
James Wade (England); 94.52	5–7	(Scotland) Peter Wright; 95.42
Kim Huybrechts (Belgium); 101.72	5–7	(Netherlands) Michael van Gerwen; 106.30
Jelle Klaasen (Netherlands); 95.42	5–7	(Netherlands) Raymond van Barneveld; 96.46
Dave Chisnall (England); 92.67	3–7	(Scotland) Gary Anderson; 101.71
Night's Average: 97.98
Highest Checkout: (Netherlands) Raymond van Barneveld 154
Most 180s: (England) Adrian Lewis 7
Night's 180s: 37

=== 16 March – Week 7 (Phase 1) ===
(Netherlands) Ahoy, Rotterdam

	Score	
James Wade (England); 94.32	7–3	(Netherlands) Jelle Klaasen; 86.21
Peter Wright (Scotland); 93.79	7–4	(England) Dave Chisnall; 90.52
Raymond van Barneveld (Netherlands); 103.71	7–2	(Scotland) Gary Anderson; 102.69
Kim Huybrechts (Belgium); 90.17	3–7	(England) Adrian Lewis; 96.18
Phil Taylor (England); 93.87	4–7	(Netherlands) Michael van Gerwen; 100.50
Night's Average: 95.20
Highest Checkout: (Netherlands) Raymond van Barneveld 156
Most 180s: (England) Adrian Lewis & (Netherlands) Raymond van Barneveld 5
Night's 180s: 21

=== 23 March – Week 8 (Phase 1) ===
(England) Manchester Arena, Manchester

	Score	
Michael van Gerwen (Netherlands); 104.20	7–4	(England) James Wade; 100.84
Kim Huybrechts (Belgium); 91.55	2–7	(Scotland) Gary Anderson; 101.86
Peter Wright (Scotland); 102.45	5–7	(England) Phil Taylor; 98.75
Jelle Klaasen (Netherlands); 81.25	5–7	(England) Adrian Lewis; 84.39
Raymond van Barneveld (Netherlands); 101.20	7–5	(Netherlands) Michael van Gerwen; 101.93
Night's Average: 96.84
Highest Checkout: (Scotland) Peter Wright 156
Most 180s: (Netherlands) Michael van Gerwen 9
Night's 180s: 33

=== 30 March – Week 9 (Phase 1) – Judgement Night ===
(Wales) Cardiff International Arena, Cardiff

	Score	
Peter Wright (Scotland); N/A	7–0	(Belgium) ~~Kim Huybrechts~~*; N/A
Phil Taylor (England); 97.50	7–5	(Netherlands) Jelle Klaasen; 91.78
Gary Anderson (Scotland); 107.13	7–3	(England) Adrian Lewis; 96.67
Raymond van Barneveld (Netherlands); 95.38	7–2	(England) James Wade; 84.97
Michael van Gerwen (Netherlands); 104.25	7–1	(England) Dave Chisnall; 100.79
Night's Average: 97.31
Highest Checkout: (Scotland) Gary Anderson 170
Most 180s: (Scotland) Gary Anderson & (England) Dave Chisnall 5
Night's 180s: 20

*Kim Huybrechts was unable to travel to Cardiff due to family reasons. Because he was already eliminated in week 8, Peter Wright was awarded the win by default and the game was not rescheduled, giving Wright the night off.

=== 6 April – Week 10 (Phase 2) ===
(Republic of Ireland) 3Arena, Dublin

	Score	
James Wade (England); 110.82	5–7	(Netherlands) Michael van Gerwen; 113.62
Raymond van Barneveld (Netherlands); 100.51	3–7	(England) Phil Taylor; 105.87
Dave Chisnall (England); 106.40	6–6	(Scotland) Peter Wright; 101.82
Adrian Lewis (England); 99.76	7–3	(Scotland) Gary Anderson; 95.20
James Wade (England); 93.58	2–7	(Netherlands) Raymond van Barneveld; 100.07
Night's Average: 102.77
Highest Checkout: (England) Dave Chisnall 145
Most 180s: (Netherlands) Raymond van Barneveld 9
Night's 180s: 41

=== 13 April – Week 11 (Phase 2) ===
(England) Liverpool Arena, Liverpool

	Score	
Gary Anderson (Scotland); 101.46	6–6	(England) Dave Chisnall; 98.98
Michael van Gerwen (Netherlands); 103.48	6–6	(Scotland) Peter Wright; 99.79
Adrian Lewis (England); 111.52	7–4	(Netherlands) Raymond van Barneveld; 99.29
Phil Taylor (England); 98.96	5–7	(England) James Wade; 93.88
Peter Wright (Scotland); 103.85	2–7	(Scotland) Gary Anderson; 113.44
Night's Average: 102.47
Highest Checkout: (England) Adrian Lewis 141
Most 180s: (Scotland) Gary Anderson & (England) Dave Chisnall 8
Night's 180s: 39
Nine-dart finish: (England) Adrian Lewis

=== 20 April – Week 12 (Phase 2) ===
(Northern Ireland) SSE Arena, Belfast

	Score	
Dave Chisnall (England); 103.97	7–3	(England) Adrian Lewis; 95.56
Phil Taylor (England); 104.38	7–4	(Scotland) Gary Anderson; 102.60
Peter Wright (Scotland); 92.53	7–3	(England) James Wade; 92.24
Michael van Gerwen (Netherlands); 103.09	7–2	(Netherlands) Raymond van Barneveld; 93.55
Dave Chisnall (England); 104.72	7–2	(England) Phil Taylor; 94.91
Night's Average: 98.76
Highest Checkout: (Netherlands) Raymond van Barneveld 140
Most 180s: (England) Dave Chisnall 6
Night's 180s: 23

=== 27 April – Week 13 (Phase 2) ===
(England) Arena Birmingham, Birmingham

	Score	
James Wade (England); 93.74	7–4	(England) Adrian Lewis; 96.68
Dave Chisnall (England); 99.04	6–6	(Netherlands) Michael van Gerwen; 101.95
Phil Taylor (England); 95.69	3–7	(Scotland) Peter Wright; 94.32
Gary Anderson (Scotland); 105.47	7–4	(Netherlands) Raymond van Barneveld; 101.98
Adrian Lewis (England); 94.53	0–7	(Netherlands) Michael van Gerwen; 110.75
Night's Average: 99.42
Highest Checkout: (Scotland) Gary Anderson 161
Most 180s: (Netherlands) Michael van Gerwen 8
Night's 180s: 19

=== 4 May – Week 14 (Phase 2) ===
(England) Sheffield Arena, Sheffield

	Score	
Peter Wright (Scotland); 100.53	7–2	(England) Adrian Lewis; 92.80
Raymond van Barneveld (Netherlands); 100.65	5–7	(England) Dave Chisnall; 109.36
James Wade (England); 87.35	3–7	(Scotland) Gary Anderson; 94.32
Michael van Gerwen (Netherlands); 102.99	3–7	(England) Phil Taylor; 100.41
Night's Average: 98.55
Highest Checkout: (England) Dave Chisnall 142
Most 180s: (Scotland) Gary Anderson & (England) Dave Chisnall 4
Night's 180s: 23

=== 11 May – Week 15 (Phase 2) ===
(Scotland) AECC, Aberdeen

	Score	
Dave Chisnall (England); 98.68	6–6	(England) James Wade; 96.29
Phil Taylor (England); 99.09	7–5	(England) Adrian Lewis; 97.50
Peter Wright (Scotland); 97.27	7–1	(Netherlands) Raymond van Barneveld; 94.74
Michael van Gerwen (Netherlands); 103.56	7–4	(Scotland) Gary Anderson; 100.46
Night's Total Average: 98.45
Highest Checkout: (Scotland) Gary Anderson 145
Most 180s: (England) Dave Chisnall 7
Night's 180s: 27

== Play-offs – 18 May ==
(England) The O2 Arena, London

	Score	
Semi-finals (best of 19 legs)
Michael van Gerwen (Netherlands); 102.22	10–7	(Scotland) Gary Anderson; 102.68
Peter Wright (Scotland); 100.04	10–9	(England) Phil Taylor; 97.62
Final (best of 21 legs)
Michael van Gerwen (Netherlands); 104.76	11–10	(Scotland) Peter Wright; 101.06
Night's Total Average: 101.4
Highest Checkout: (Scotland) Gary Anderson 160
Most 180s: (Netherlands) Michael van Gerwen 13
Night's 180s: 35

== Table and streaks ==
=== Table ===
After the first nine weeks (phase 1), the bottom two in the table are eliminated. In the next six weeks (phase 2) the eight remaining players each play a further seven matches. The top four players then compete in the playoffs.

Two points are awarded for a win and one point for a draw. When players are tied on points, leg difference is used first as a tie-breaker, after that legs won against throw and then tournament average.

#	Name	Pld	W	D	L	Pts	LF	LA	+/-	LWAT	100+	140+	180s	A	HC	C%
1	(Netherlands) Michael van Gerwen W	16	10	4	2	24	102	70	+32	34	174	154	54	104.92	170	40.54%
2	(Scotland) Peter Wright RU	16	10	3	3	23	98	68	+30	30	203	144	46	98.86	156	38.89%
3	(England) Phil Taylor	16	8	3	5	19	92	85	+7	32	206	133	37	98.15	142	40.17%
4	(Scotland) Gary Anderson	16	7	4	5	18	91	79	+12	35	192	127	53	102.16	170	39.91%
5	(England) Dave Chisnall	16	6	4	6	16	82	87	−5	25	166	107	65	99.76	160	39.47%
6	(Netherlands) Raymond van Barneveld	16	6	2	8	14	79	89	−10	26	186	131	58	98.69	156	37.09%
7	(England) James Wade	16	5	3	8	13	82	95	−13	23	278	133	28	95.29	121	37.36%
8	(England) Adrian Lewis	16	6	1	9	13	76	90	−14	25	197	122	46	96.84	170	36.89%
9	(Netherlands) Jelle Klaasen	9	1	1	7	3	42	58	−16	15	120	51	19	92.30	152	34.71%
10	(Belgium) Kim Huybrechts	9	0	3	6	3	37	60	−23	11	93	70	24	95.58	140	34.58%

Last updated: 12 May 2017
Source: Match reports from the results section.

Top four qualified for the Play-offs after Week 15.
NB: LWAT = Legs won against throw. A = Average C% = Checkout percentage HC = High checkout. C = Champion

RU = Runner-up

=== Streaks ===
Player	Phase 1, Weeks 1 to 9											Phase 2, Weeks 10 to 15										Play-offs	
Player	1	2	3	4	5		6	7	8		9	10		11		12		13		14	15	SF	F
(Netherlands) Michael van Gerwen	D	W	W	D	DNP		W	W	W	L	W	W		D		W		D	W	L	W	W	W
(Scotland) Peter Wright	W	L	W	D	W		W	W	L		W†	D		D	L	W		W		W	W	W	L
(England) Phil Taylor	W	D	W	D	D		L	L	W		W	W		L		W	L	L		W	W	L	—N/a
(Scotland) Gary Anderson	D	W	L	D	D		W	L	W		W	L		D	W	L		W		W	L	L	—N/a
(England) Dave Chisnall	L	L	W	L	W	W	L	L	DNP		L	D		D		W	W	D		W	D	Eliminated	
(Netherlands) Raymond van Barneveld	W	D	L	D	L		W	W	W		W	L	W	L		L		L		L	L	Eliminated	
(England) James Wade	W	D	W	D	L		L	W	L		L	L	L	W		L		W		L	D	Eliminated	
(England) Adrian Lewis	L	W	L	D	L		W	W	W		L	W		W		L		L	L	L	L	Eliminated	
(Netherlands) Jelle Klaasen	L	L	L	W	D		L	L	L		L	Eliminated											
(Belgium) Kim Huybrechts	L	D	L	D	D		L	L	L		L†	Eliminated											

Legend:	W	Win	D	Draw	L	Loss	DNP	Did not play	†	Awarded by forfeit	—N/a	Eliminated

=== Positions by Week ===
Player	Phase 1, Weeks 1 to 9									Phase 2, Weeks 10 to 15					
Player	1	2	3	4	5	6	7	8	9	10	11	12	13	14	15
(Netherlands) Michael van Gerwen	5	2	1	1	3	2	2	1	1	1	1	1	1	1	1
(Scotland) Peter Wright	2	7	4	4	2	1	1	2	2	2	2	2	2	2	2
(England) Phil Taylor	1	1	2	2	1	4	7	6	5	4	5	3	4	4	3
(Scotland) Gary Anderson	6	3	5	5	6	3	6	4	4	5	3	4	3	3	4
(England) Dave Chisnall	10	10	8	10	5	7	8	8	8	8	8	7	7	5	5
(Netherlands) Raymond van Barneveld	3	4	6	6	7	6	4	3	3	3	4	5	5	6	6
(England) James Wade	4	5	3	3	4	5	3	7	7	7	7	8	8	8	7
(England) Adrian Lewis	7	6	7	7	8	8	5	5	6	6	6	6	6	7	8
(Netherlands) Jelle Klaasen	9	9	10	9	10	10	10	9	9	Eliminated					
(Belgium) Kim Huybrechts	8	8	9	8	9	9	9	10	10	Eliminated					
