= List of players with a 2017 PDC Tour Card =

To compete in the Professional Darts Corporation pro tour tournaments one needs a Tour card.

In total 128 players are granted Tour Cards, which enables them to participate in all Players Championships, UK Open Qualifiers and European Tour events.

A tour card is valid for 2 years. The top 64 in the PDC Order of Merit and some secondary tour winners and those who won card at Q-School in 2016 still had a valid card for 2017. 28 remaining places were played out at the 2017 Qualifying-School. All players who won a card there had their Order of Merit ranking reset to zero.

== Players ==
No.	Country	Player	Prize money	Qualified through
1	Netherlands	Michael van Gerwen	£1,642,000	Top 64 of Order of Merit
2	Scotland	Gary Anderson	£740,500	Top 64 of Order of Merit
3	Scotland	Peter Wright	£512,250	Top 64 of Order of Merit
4	England	Adrian Lewis	£426,500	Top 64 of Order of Merit
5	England	James Wade	£392,750	Top 64 of Order of Merit
6	England	Phil Taylor	£360,750	Top 64 of Order of Merit
7	England	Dave Chisnall	£354,500	Top 64 of Order of Merit
8	Austria	Mensur Suljović	£324,250	Top 64 of Order of Merit
9	Netherlands	Jelle Klaasen	£309,500	Top 64 of Order of Merit
10	Netherlands	Raymond van Barneveld	£299,500	Top 64 of Order of Merit
11	England	Michael Smith	£290,250	Top 64 of Order of Merit
12	Scotland	Robert Thornton	£283,750	Top 64 of Order of Merit
13	Belgium	Kim Huybrechts	£271,000	Top 64 of Order of Merit
14	England	Ian White	£267,000	Top 64 of Order of Merit
15	Netherlands	Benito van de Pas	£251,500	Top 64 of Order of Merit
16	Australia	Simon Whitlock	£208,750	Top 64 of Order of Merit
17	England	Terry Jenkins	£197,500	Top 64 of Order of Merit
18	England	Alan Norris	£190,750	Top 64 of Order of Merit
19	England	Stephen Bunting	£185,250	Top 64 of Order of Merit
20	Wales	Gerwyn Price	£182,000	Top 64 of Order of Merit
21	Northern Ireland	Daryl Gurney	£179,750	Top 64 of Order of Merit
22	England	Mervyn King	£171,750	Top 64 of Order of Merit
23	Wales	Mark Webster	£162,500	Top 64 of Order of Merit
24	Northern Ireland	Brendan Dolan	£156,750	Top 64 of Order of Merit
25	Netherlands	Vincent van der Voort	£153,750	Top 64 of Order of Merit
26	England	Justin Pipe	£143,000	Top 64 of Order of Merit
27	England	Steve Beaton	£141,250	Top 64 of Order of Merit
28	England	Joe Cullen	£132,000	Top 64 of Order of Merit
29	England	Jamie Caven	£120,000	Top 64 of Order of Merit
30	Australia	Kyle Anderson	£118,750	Top 64 of Order of Merit
31	Wales	Jamie Lewis	£113,250	Top 64 of Order of Merit
32	England	Darren Webster	£107,250	Top 64 of Order of Merit
33	England	Andrew Gilding	£107,250	Top 64 of Order of Merit
34	Scotland	John Henderson	£104,750	Top 64 of Order of Merit
35	Spain	Cristo Reyes	£100,750	Top 64 of Order of Merit
36	England	James Wilson	£96,250	Top 64 of Order of Merit
37	England	Joe Murnan	£88,750	Top 64 of Order of Merit
38	Germany	Max Hopp	£84,500	Top 64 of Order of Merit
39	Netherlands	Christian Kist	£81,500	Top 64 of Order of Merit
40	England	Robbie Green	£81,000	Top 64 of Order of Merit
41	Austria	Rowby-John Rodriguez	£77,500	Top 64 of Order of Merit
42	England	Chris Dobey	£76,000	Top 64 of Order of Merit
43	England	Steve West	£75,750	Top 64 of Order of Merit
44	England	Keegan Brown	£70,250	Top 64 of Order of Merit
45	England	Kevin Painter	£68,250	Top 64 of Order of Merit
46	England	Josh Payne	£67,750	Top 64 of Order of Merit
47	Belgium	Ronny Huybrechts	£67,250	Top 64 of Order of Merit
48	England	Ricky Evans	£65,000	Top 64 of Order of Merit
49	Netherlands	Jermaine Wattimena	£64,500	Top 64 of Order of Merit
50	South Africa	Devon Petersen	£63,500	Top 64 of Order of Merit
51	Belgium	Dimitri Van den Bergh	£60,750	Top 64 of Order of Merit
52	Wales	Jonny Clayton	£54,250	Top 64 of Order of Merit
53	England	Andy Hamilton	£53,500	Top 64 of Order of Merit
54	England	David Pallett	£46,500	Top 64 of Order of Merit
55	Netherlands	Jan Dekker	£41,500	Top 64 of Order of Merit
56	Netherlands	Dirk van Duijvenbode	£41,500	Top 64 of Order of Merit
57	Netherlands	Jeffrey de Zwaan	£39,000	Top 64 of Order of Merit
58	England	Andy Boulton	£39,000	Top 64 of Order of Merit
59	England	Wes Newton	£37,750	Top 64 of Order of Merit
60	Netherlands	Jeffrey de Graaf	£34,750	Top 64 of Order of Merit
61	Ireland	Mick McGowan	£32,500	Top 64 of Order of Merit
62	England	Andy Jenkins	£32,500	Top 64 of Order of Merit
63	Netherlands	Ron Meulenkamp	£31,750	Top 64 of Order of Merit
64	Ireland	William O'Connor	£30,250	Top 64 of Order of Merit
65	England	James Richardson	£25,500	2016 Q-School
66	England	Simon Stevenson	£21,000	2016 Q-School
67	Netherlands	Berry van Peer	£17,750	2015 Development Tour
68	Netherlands	Vincent Kamphuis	£16,500	2016 Q-School
69	England	Mark Walsh	£16,500	2016 Q-School
70	Greece	John Michael	£15,250	2016 Q-School
71	Finland	Kim Viljanen	£12,000	2016 Scandinavian Tour
72	Netherlands	Yordi Meeuwisse	£11,500	2016 Q-School
73	England	John Bowles	£11,000	2016 Q-School
74	England	Tony Newell	£10,750	2016 Q-School
75	England	Matt Clark	£10,750	2016 Q-School
76	Belgium	Mike De Decker	£10,750	2015 Development Tour
77	England	Ted Evetts	£9,750	2016 Q-School
78	England	Ryan Meikle	£9,000	2016 Q-School
79	England	Richie Corner	£8,750	2015 Challenge Tour
80	Scotland	Mark Barilli	£8,000	2016 Q-School
81	Wales	Jonathan Worsley	£6,750	2016 Q-School
82	England	Dennis Smith	£6,500	2016 Q-School
83	England	Shaun Griffiths	£5,750	2015 Challenge Tour
84	Wales	Robert Owen	£5,750	2016 Q-School
85	England	Ross Smith	£5,500	2016 Q-School
86	England	Darron Brown	£5,500	2016 Q-School
87	England	Matthew Dennant	£5,000	2016 Q-School
88	England	Ricky Williams	£4,250	2016 Q-School
89	England	Ryan Palmer	£3,500	2016 Q-School
90	England	Brian Woods	£3,250	2016 Q-School
91	Netherlands	Dick van Dijk	£2,750	2016 Q-School
92	England	Harry Robinson	£2,000	2016 Q-School
93	England	Terry Temple	£1,750	2016 Q-School
94	Northern Ireland	Ray Campbell	£1,750	2016 Q-School
95	England	Andy Parsons	£1,750	2016 Q-School
96	England	Simon Preston	£1,500	2016 Q-School
97	England	Rob Cross	£0	2016 Challenge Tour
98	England	Ryan Searle	£0	2016 Challenge Tour
99	England	Ross Twell	£0	2016 Development Tour
100	England	Aden Kirk	£0	2016 Development Tour
101	India	Prakash Jiwa	£0	2017 Q-School
102	England	Lee Bryant	£0	2017 Q-School
103	England	Stephen Burton	£0	2017 Q-School
104	Scotland	Jim Brown	£0	2017 Q-School
105	England	Richard North	£0	2017 Q-School
106	England	Ritchie Edhouse	£0	2017 Q-School
107	Hong Kong	Royden Lam	£0	2017 Q-School
108	Austria	Maik Langendorf	£0	2017 Q-School
109	England	Scott Taylor	£0	2017 Q-School
110	Wales	Richie Burnett	£0	2017 Q-School
111	Canada	John Part	£0	2017 Q-School
112	Ireland	Steve Lennon	£0	2017 Q-School
113	Germany	Martin Schindler	£0	2017 Q-School
114	England	Kirk Shepherd	£0	2017 Q-School
115	Spain	Antonio Alcinas	£0	2017 Q-School
116	Australia	Paul Nicholson	£0	2017 Q-School
117	Scotland	Jamie Bain	£0	2017 Q-School
118	Netherlands	Jimmy Hendriks	£0	2017 Q-School
119	England	Ronnie Baxter	£0	2017 Q-School
120	England	Steve Hine	£0	2017 Q-School
121	Netherlands	Sven Groen	£0	2017 Q-School
122	England	Paul Rowley	£0	2017 Q-School
123	England	Scott Darbyshire	£0	2017 Q-School
124	Northern Ireland	Mickey Mansell	£0	2017 Q-School
125	England	Chris Quantock	£0	2017 Q-School
126	Canada	John Norman Jnr	£0	2017 Q-School
127	England	Darren Johnson	£0	2017 Q-School
128	Latvia	Madars Razma	£0	2017 Q-School

== See also ==
- List of darts players
- List of darts players who have switched organisation
