= Royal Show =

Annual agricultural show in England (1839–2009)

Logo of the last Royal Show in 2009

The Royal Show, also known as the Royal Agricultural Show, was an annual agricultural show held by the Royal Agricultural Society of England every year from 1839 to 2009. The event encompassed all aspects of farming, food and rural life – from the best of British livestock to the latest business and technological innovations in the farming industry. Over 1,000 stands, world-class livestock and equine classes attracted visitors from over 100 countries.

The Royal Show gave the name Park Royal to the part of west London which once hosted the show. The Royal Agricultural Society of England had planned to make the site a permanent home for the Royal Show. It was not a success and the society sold the land in 1907.

== History ==
=== On the road from 1839 to 1902 ===
Between 1839 and 1902 the Royal Show was held at various locations across the country:

Year	Town/City	Venue	Rf.
1839	Oxford		
1840	Cambridge		
1841	Liverpool	Falkner's Fields	
1842	Bristol		
1843	Derby		
1844	Southampton		
1845	Shrewsbury		
1846	Newcastle		
1847	Northampton		
1848	York		
1849	Norwich		
1850	Exeter	Exhibition Fields, Whipton Barton	
1851	Windsor		
1852	Lewes		
1853	Gloucester		
1854	Lincoln		
1855	Carlisle		
1856	Chelmsford		
1857	Salisbury		
1858	Chester		
1859	Warwick	Warwick Racecourse	
1860	Canterbury		
1861	Leeds		
1862	London	Battersea	
1863	Worcester		
1864	Newcastle		
1865	Plymouth		
1866	Cancelled due to an outbreak of Rinderpest		
1867	Bury St Edmunds		
1868	Leicester		
1869	Manchester		
1870	Oxford		
1870	Glasgow		
1871	Cardiff		
1871	Wolverhampton	Wolverhampton Race Course	
1872	Cardiff		
1873	Hull		
1874	Bedford		
1875	Taunton		
1876	Birmingham	Aston Park	
1877	Liverpool	Newsham Park	
1878	Bristol		
1879	London	Queen's Park	
1880	Carlisle		
1881	Derby		
1882	Reading	Palmer Park	
1883	York		
1884	Shrewsbury		
1885	Preston		
1886	Norwich		
1887	Newcastle		
1888	Nottingham	Wollaton Park	
1889	Windsor	Great Park	
1890	Plymouth		
1891	Doncaster		
1892	Warwick	Castle Park	
1893	Chester		
1894	Cambridge		
1895	Darlington		
1896	Leicester		
1897	Manchester		
1898	Birmingham	Four Oaks Park, Sutton Coldfield	
1899	Maidstone		
1900	York		
1901	Cardiff	Sophia Gardens	
1902	Carlisle		

=== Park Royal from 1903 to 1905 ===
Following the 1879 event at Queen's Park, which incurred a large financial loss due to bad weather, the Royal Agricultural Society made the decision to look for a permanent showground, in order to reduce costs and make additional income from letting the site for other events. Eventually a 102 acres (41 ha) site was leased near Twyford Abbey in West London, and given the name Park Royal by the society, a name it continues to bear. The first show was held on the site in 1903.

The attendances at the 1903 show were disappointing, and even worse at the shows in the two following years. By then it was decided that the idea of a permanent show had been a mistake, and that the travelling show should resume. The show grounds were sold for industrial use in 1907.

=== Back on the road from 1906 to 1962 ===
Year	Town/City	Venue	Rf.
1906	Derby	Osmaston Park	
1907	Lincoln	West Common	
1908	Newcastle		
1909	Gloucester		
1910	Liverpool	Wavertree Playground	
1911	Norwich	Crown Point	
1912	Doncaster		
1913	Bristol		
1914	Shrewsbury		
1915	Nottingham	Wollaton Park	
1916	Manchester		
1917	No show		
1918	No show		
1919	Cardiff	Sophia Gardens	
1920	Darlington		
1921	Derby	Osmaston Park	
1922	Cambridge	Trumpington	
1923	Newcastle		
1924	Leicester		
1925	Chester		
1926	Reading	Caversham Park (later Henley Road Cemetery)	
1927	Newport	Tredegar Park	
1928	Nottingham	Wollaton Park	
1931	Warwick	Castle Park	
1934	Ipswich	Chantry Park	
1936	Bristol	Ashton Court	
1937	Wolverhampton	Wrottesley Park	
1938	Cardiff		
1939	Windsor		
1947	Lincoln	West Common	
1948	York	York Racecourse	
1949	Shrewsbury		
1950	Oxford		
1951	Cambridge	Trumpington	
1952	Newton Abbot		
1953	Blackpool		
1954	Windsor		
1955	Nottingham	Wollaton Park	
1956	Newcastle	Town Moor	
1957	Norwich	Royal Norfolk Showground, Costessey	
1958	Bristol		
1959	Oxford		
1960	Cambridge	Trumpington	
1961	Cambridge	Trumpington	
1962	Newcastle	Town Moor	

=== Stoneleigh Park from 1963 to 2006 ===
From 1963, the Royal Show was held in Stoneleigh Park (previously known as the National Agricultural Centre or NAC) near Stoneleigh in Warwickshire, England. The first show at Stoneleigh lasted four days and attracted 111,916 visitors.

=== The 2007 show ===
More than 140,000 visitors were expected to attend the 2007 show; however, bad weather forced the show to close early for the first time in its history. Torrential rains left the showground saturated and police and show organisers took the decision to close the show a day ahead of schedule "to ensure the safety and welfare of the public, traders and exhibitors".

Two of the showground's car parks were closed on Monday evening after drivers had to be towed free. A further 30 acres (12 ha) of barley and hay fields were mown to provide additional parking on the Tuesday.

The decision was described as "heartbreaking" by the Royal Agricultural Society of England. John Moverley, RASE Chief Executive, said the financial implications of the wet weather and closing the show early were being assessed. "We haven’t got exact figures, but it looks as though we are down by about 10% for the first two days on last year," he said.

=== The end ===
The Royal Show was again run at Stoneleigh in 2008. However, on 3 April 2009, organisers said the 2009 show would be the last.

The Agricultural Buildings Show has taken over in part from the Royal Show at Stoneleigh Park.

== See also ==
- Royal Welsh Show largest agricultural show in Europe
- Agricultural show
- Royal Windsor Horse Show
