= Modlniczka =

- Village
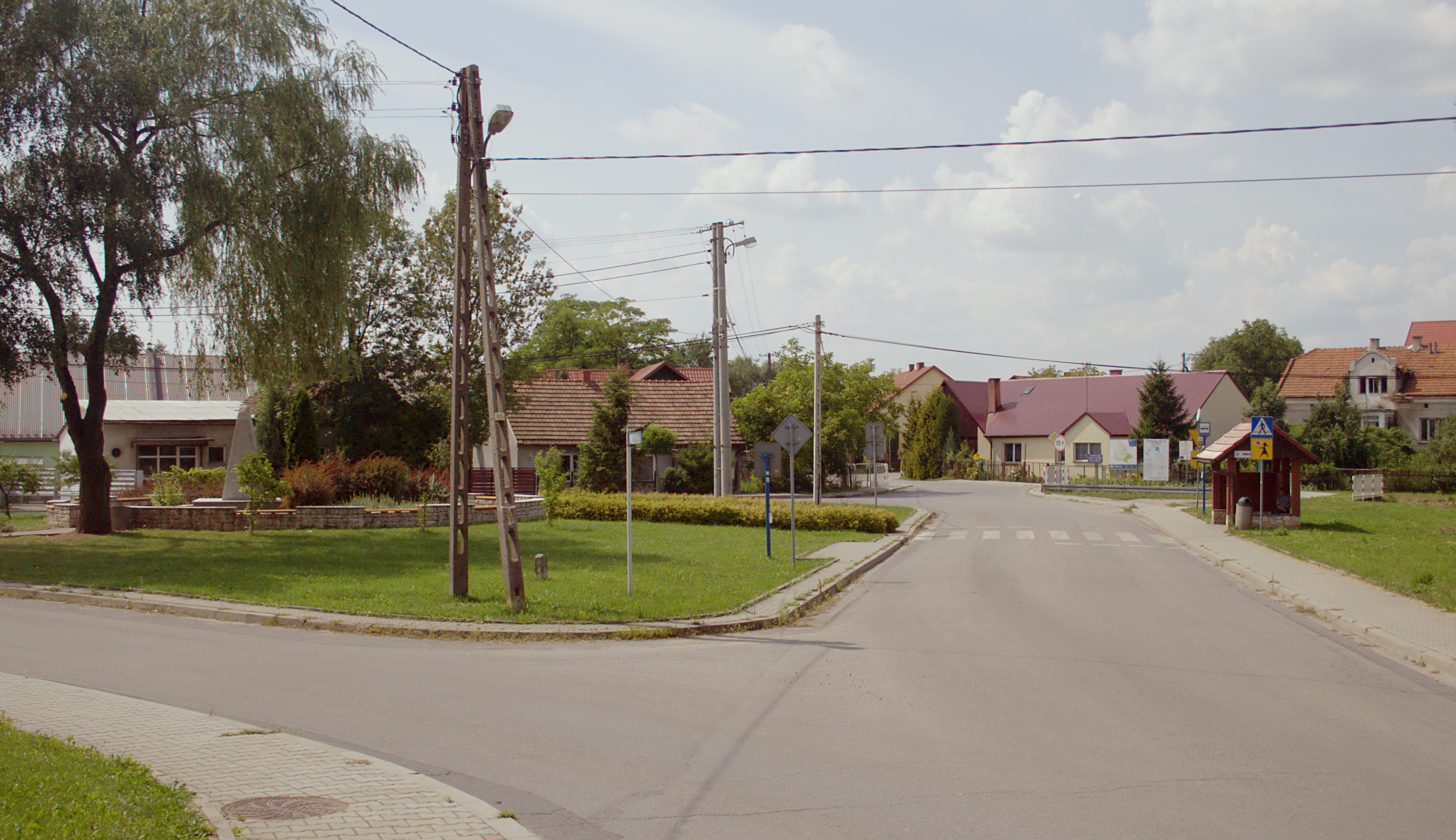

- Location within Poland
- Coordinates: 50°7′N 19°51′E
- Country: Poland
- Voivodeship: Lesser Poland
- County: Kraków
- Gmina: Wielka Wieś
- Population: 810

Modlniczka [mɔdlˈnit͡ʂka] is a village in the administrative district of Gmina Wielka Wieś, within Kraków County, Lesser Poland Voivodeship, in southern Poland.
