= Sowton =

Village and civil parish in Devon, England

Coordinates: 50°43′27″N 3°27′03″W

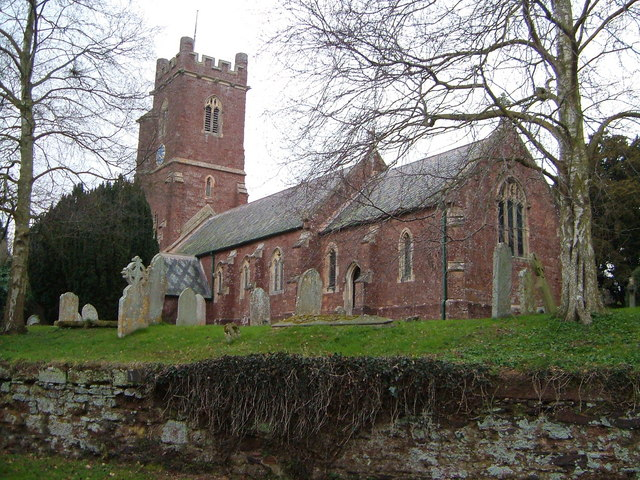
Sowton church

Sowton is a village and civil parish east of Exeter in East Devon, England. It has a population of 639.

Its parish council merged with that of nearby Clyst St Mary in 1976 to form Bishop's Clyst.

St Michael's church was rebuilt in 1844–45, by John Hayward and paid for by John Garratt. He retained the original perpendicular northern arcade. It is a rare example of an early Victorian Tractarian village church. It is a grade I listed building.

Sowton has an old village centre but serves as a major Exeter suburb, with a large industrial estate, park and ride site and modern housing developments.

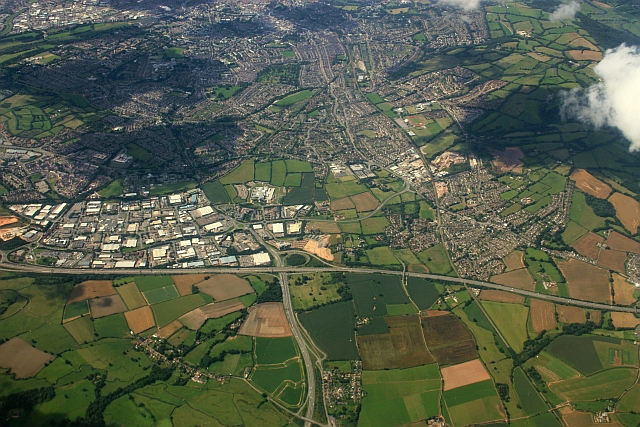
M5 junction 29, Sowton industrial estate is to the left of the picture.

Sowton is also the name of an industrial estate at grid reference SX964920. The area is located next to the M5 motorway between junctions 29 and 30, the opposite side from the village and is served by Digby & Sowton railway station.

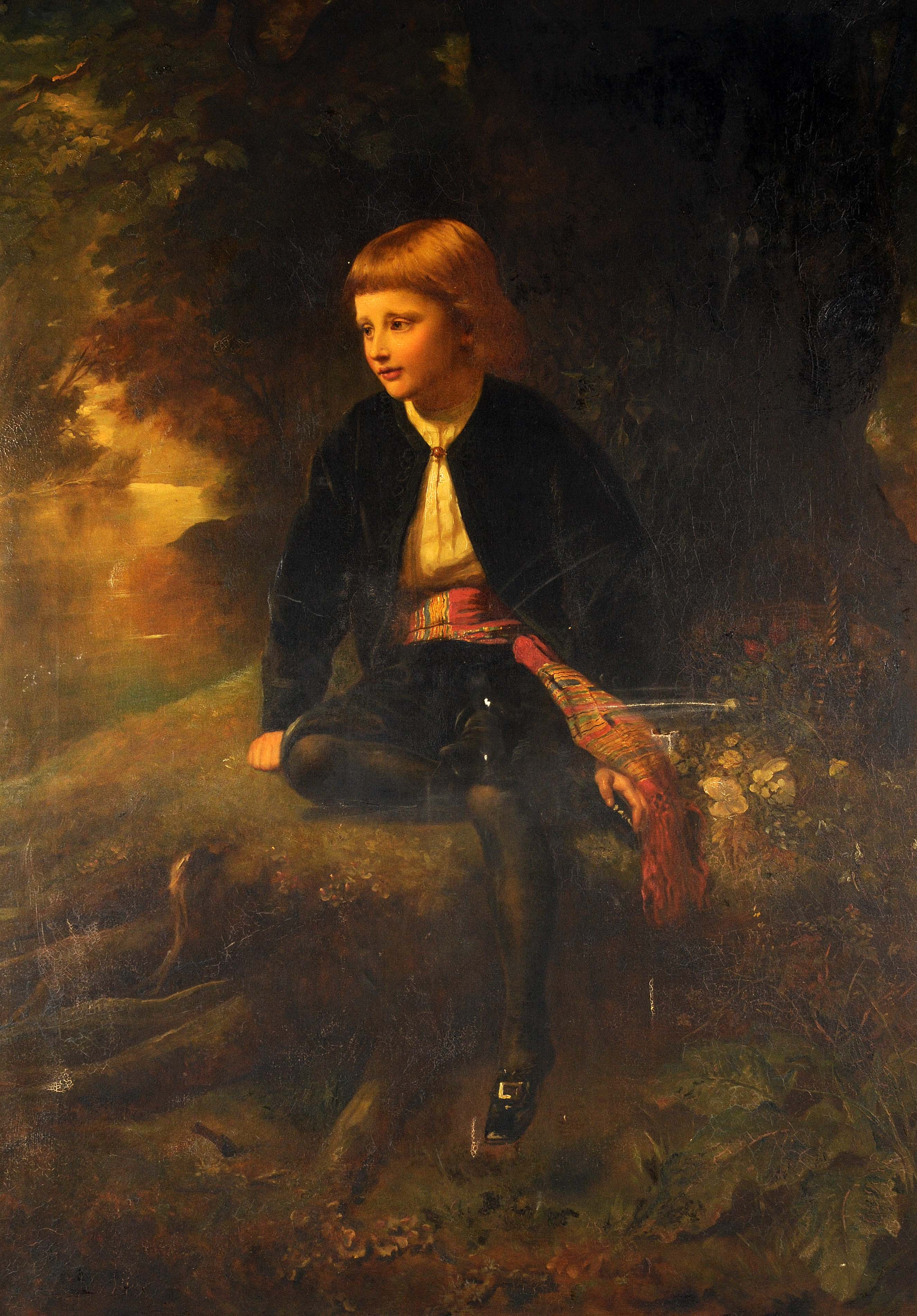
Lawrence Challoner Garratt (1868–1946), OBE, JP, of Bishops Court, dated 1874.

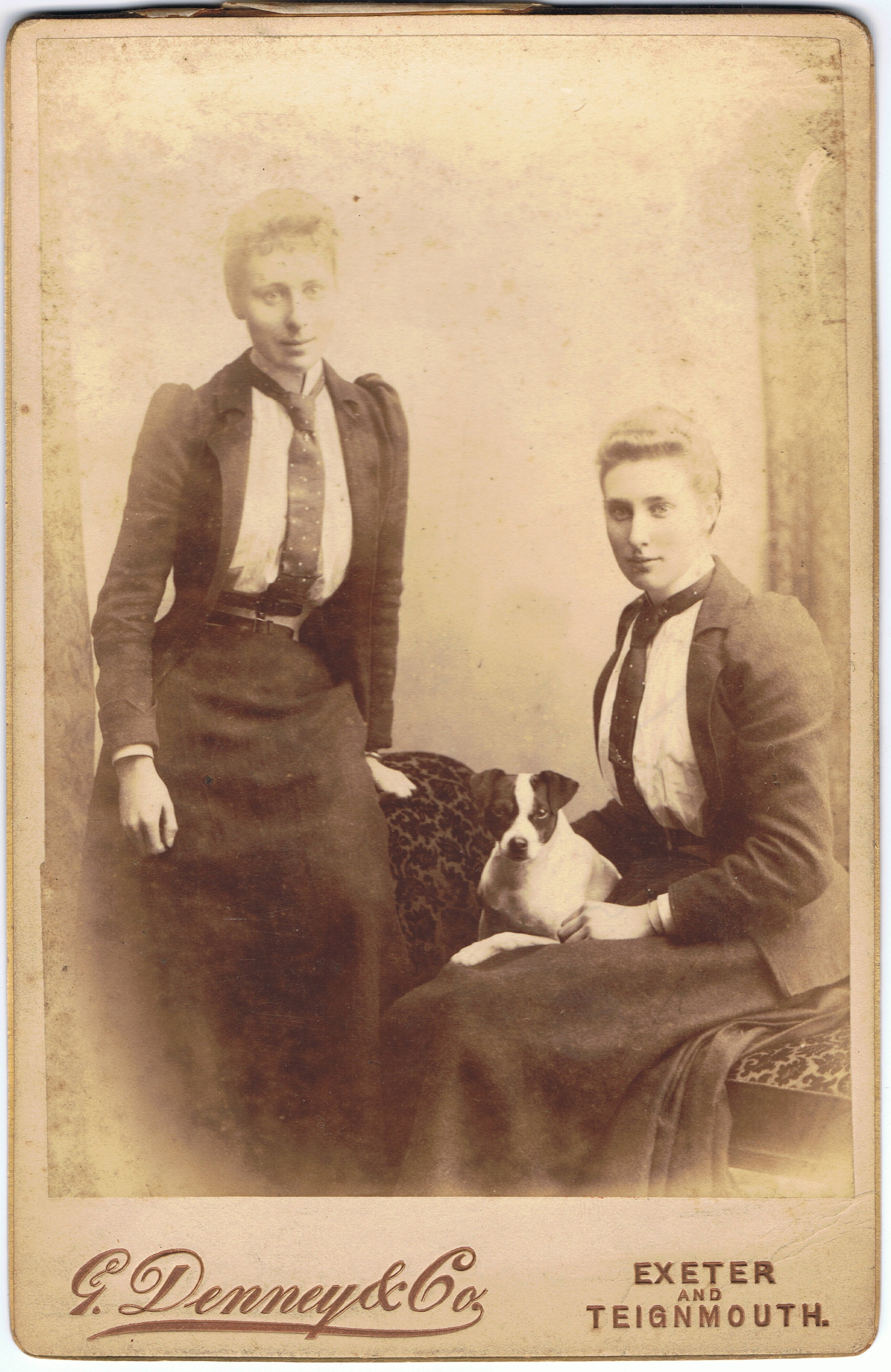
Sisters Kathleen and Sybil Garratt, of Bishops Court.

Most of the industrial estate is covered with large retailers, warehousing and distributing, as well as a small number of manufacturers. There is also a Park and Ride location for bus services to Exeter city centre.

The parish contains Bishop's Court, the medieval palace of the bishops of Exeter.
