= Royal Bath and West Show =

Agricultural show in England

Coordinates: 51°09′25″N 2°31′35″W

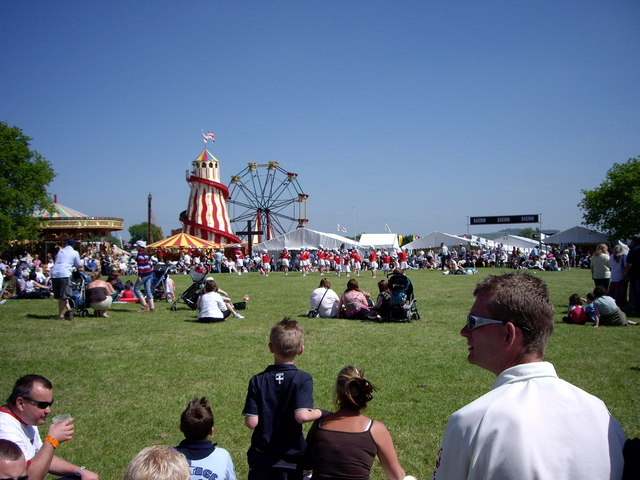
2006 Royal Bath and West Show

The Royal Bath and West is an agricultural show for the West of England. Held every year at its permanent show ground near Shepton Mallet, Somerset, it is one of a number of County shows in the United Kingdom and is a four-day show. In 2009 and 2010 it attracted over 155,000 people.

== Background ==
The Royal Bath and West Show is organised and run by the Royal Bath and West of England Society. It was founded in 1777 in Bath by a group of philanthropists led by Edmund Rack, and is now a registered charity organisation (1039397). The Society was formed with the aims of encouraging agriculture, arts, manufacture and commerce.

== The show ==
The annual show was initiated at Taunton in 1852 and was originally peripatetic. It was held on Durdham Down in Bristol in 1886 and again in 1921. Latterly it was held in Bath in 1912 and 1927. Exeter's Whipton Barton Exhibition Fields hosted the show in 1909 and 1954.

The Royal Bath & West Show aims to celebrate all aspects of farming and rural life, from the best of British livestock to the latest technological innovations in the farming industry. The show offers shopping, food halls, floral marquee, rural crafts, country pursuits, dog show, equestrian competitions and arena displays. The show also attracts over 1,000 trade stands.

It is set in a 240 acres (97 ha) permanent showground, with a 3 acres (1.2 ha) show ring with a 1,200-seater grandstand and complete with its own steam model railway, a canoeing lake and a professional 4x4 off-road track.

== Royal visitors ==
Every year a member of the Royal Family visits the show. In 2008, Princess Anne visited the show, and in 2009 the Prince of Wales and the Duchess of Cornwall both attended; the Prince of Wales had last visited the show in 1991. In 2010, the Countess of Wessex become the new Vice Patron of the Royal Bath and West Society. The Queen Mother and Queen Elizabeth II have also visited the show in past years.

== 21st century ==
=== 2009 show ===
The 2009 Royal Bath & West Show was held from Wednesday 27 May to Saturday 30 May. Mortimer's Farm won Supreme Champion Beef Animal with their Charolais bull 'Mortimer's Eurovision'. The Imagineering Fair won the gold medal for the best feature in Show with its display of aircraft and vehicles celebrating the 100 Years of Naval Aviation. The Smelliest Cheese competition was won by Charles Martell, the maker of the Stinking Bishop cheese. The Champion Cheese in the Dairy Produce section, which was a block of Davidstow Cheddar made by Dairy Crest, was brought by R H Longman for £1000.

The Cannon Ball Man, the Band of the Brigade of Gurkhas and the French ornithologist Christian Moullec with his geese, were all features of the show.

=== 2010 show ===
The 2010 Royal Bath and West show took place from 2 to 5 June. Over 155,000 visitors attended, highlights included the Red Devils Parachute Display team and skilled displays from the Avon & Somerset Mounted and Dog Handling Sections. Over 2,400 Pigs, Sheep, Goats and Cattle and 2,000 horses were in competition. For the first time ever a Ladies Day took place on Friday 4 June.
