= Bishop's Court, Devon =

Building in Devon, England

Bishop's Court
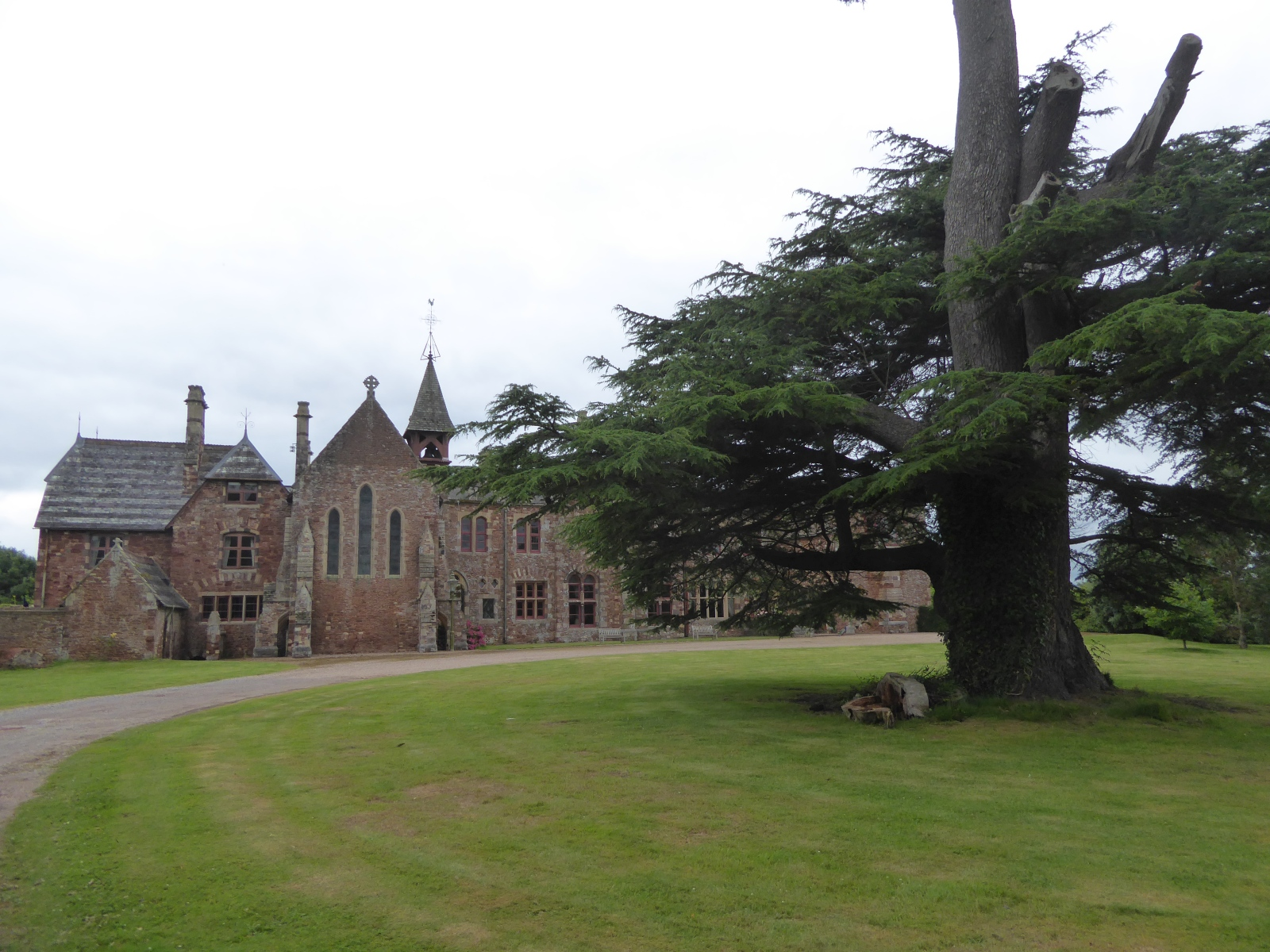
- The east front of Bishop's Court

General information
- Type: Country house, Bishop's palace
- Architectural style: Gothic
- Location: Bishop's Court Lane, Sowton, Devon, England
- Coordinates: 50°43′04″N 3°26′42″W
- Completed: 13th century

Technical details
- Material: Heavitree stone

Bishop's Court is a large 21,000 sq ft (2,000 m^{2}) English country house and former Bishop's palace in Sowton, Devon, near Exeter. It was built in the 13th century and is Grade I listed. It was a palace of the medieval bishops of Exeter from the 13th century to the 16th century.

== Architecture ==
The building is described by Pevsner as 'intensely Gothic' in style and is largely built of Heavitree stone.

The house unwent rebuilding works in 1803, having been purchased by Admiral Lord Graves. It then underwent further remodelling in 1860–4 by William White for the Garratt family, having come into the ownership of John Garratt, former Lord Mayor of London.

The chapel contains a triptych by Nathaniel Westlake.

The former stables were built in the early 16th century, also of Heavitree stone, and are Grade I listed.

The former tithe barn is thought to have been built in the early 14th century and is also Grade I listed.

== History ==
Bishop's Court was acquired by the bishops of Exeter in 1265 and used by them until 1546.

In 1549, Bishop John Vesey was induced to grant the Manor of Bishop's Clyst, along with the palace, to John Russell, 1st Earl of Bedford.

Sir Thomas Fairfax used Bishop's Court as a garrison during the blockade of Exeter in 1645.

In the early 1830s, the estate was purchased from the family of Baron Graves by John Garratt, a wealthy London tea merchant who had served as Lord Mayor of London in 1824–1825. The Garratt family owned Bishop's Court for over a century, commissioning architect William White in 1860–1864 to extensively remodel the house in the High Victorian Gothic style and funding the rebuilding of the nearby parish church of St Michael in Sowton. The family sold the estate in the mid-1950s, leaving a collection of ancestral portraits and furnishings at the house on loan until the early 21st century."Gothic house legal case". The Daily Telegraph. 4 April 2012.

By the 1950s, Bishop's Court was being used as a company headquarters.

== See also ==
- Bishop's Palace, Exeter
