= Westpoint Exeter =

Multi-purpose indoor arena and showground at Clyst St Mary near Exeter, England

- Westpoint, Westpoint Centre
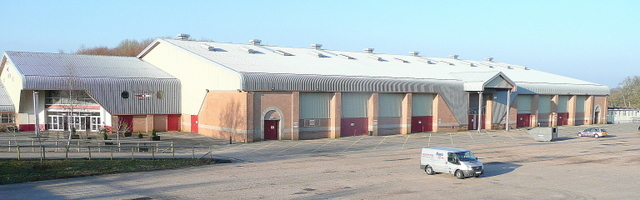
- The main arena in March 2010
- Interactive map of Westpoint Exeter
- Former names: Westpoint Arena
- Location: Clyst St Mary, near Exeter, England
- Coordinates: 50.713135°N 3.440506°W
- Owner: Westpoint Centre (Devon) Ltd
- Capacity: 7,500 (concerts)

Construction
- Opened: May 1990
- Cost: £3 million
- Architect: Devon County Agricultural Association

Website
- westpointexeter.co.uk

Westpoint Exeter (formerly Westpoint Arena) is a multi-purpose indoor arena and showground, at Clyst St Mary, near Exeter, England. The capacity of the venue is 7,500 people. It hosts local concerts, fairs and exhibitions. Westpoint is the largest exhibition and entertainment venue in the South West and is located near to Exeter Airport.

== Construction ==
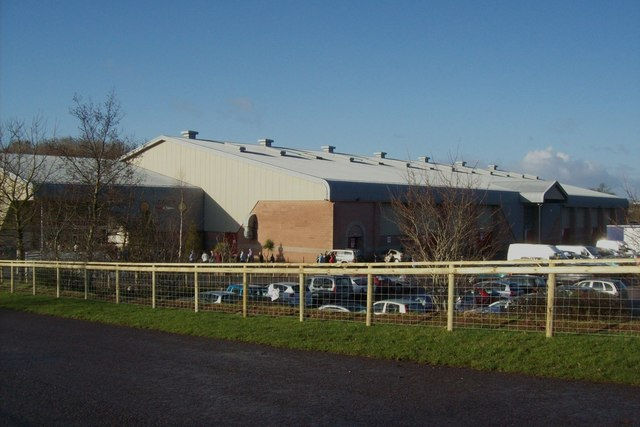
Westpoint Arena in January 2009

Westpoint's arena and showground was built on the former Ivington Farm to host the annual Devon County Show each May. The farm was purchased by the Devon County Agricultural Association, with work on the site estimated to have cost a further sum in excess of £3 million. 50,000 square feet of unobstructed floor space, and a building capable of seating 6,000 people opened in 1990. The 4,590 sq metre column-free main arena doubles as an exhibition area and, for the County Show, a cattle shed. Large car parks can accommodate well over 12,000 cars at any one time.

The Association and its subsidiary company Westpoint Centre (Devon) Ltd rent the facilities out to event organisers during the remainder of the year.

== History ==
It has been the venue for the Devon County Show since 1990. From 2009 until 2025, Westpoint had played host to a week of the Premier League Darts.

The arena has hosted concert performances by acclaimed artists including Bryan Adams, David Bowie, Elton John, Lewis Capaldi, Manic Street Preachers, Meat Loaf, Morrissey, Muse, Oasis, Robbie Williams, Stereophonics and The 1975 as well as car shows such as the BHP Fuel Fest. The venue has also regularly hosted shows such as Disney on Ice and Holiday on Ice.

The creation of a Nightingale Hospital at Westpoint Exeter during the UK COVID-19 Coronavirus crisis was announced in April 2020, but the location was changed later the same month to a former Homebase store in Sowton on the outskirts of Exeter.

== See also ==
- Devon County Show
