= Clyst St Mary =

Village in Devon, England

Coordinates: 50.709274°N 3.455029°W

- Location within Devon
- Population: 1,193 (2021)
- OS grid reference: SX97369097
- District: East Devon
- Shire county: Devon
- Region: South West
- Country: England
- Sovereign state: United Kingdom
- Post town: EXETER
- Postcode district: EX5
- Dialling code: 01392
- Police: Devon and Cornwall
- Fire: Devon and Somerset
- Ambulance: South Western
- UK Parliament: Exmouth and Exeter East

Clyst St Mary is a small village and civil parish 3 miles (4.8 km) east of Exeter on the main roads to Exmouth and Sidmouth in East Devon. The name comes from the Celtic word clyst meaning 'clear stream'. The village is a major part of the electoral ward of Clyst Valley. At the 2011 Census this ward population was 2,326. At the 2021 census, its population increased to 2,400, which was 3.2% more than that recorded at the 2011 census.

== Description ==
Clyst St Mary contains Westpoint Arena and Showground, the Crealy Adventure Park, the Cat and Fiddle Training Ground for Exeter City F.C. and has a small industrial estate, Langdon's Business Park and a major office development.

The population has risen steadily, it was 97 in 1801, 157 in 1901 and 642 in 2004. This figure for the parish excludes all residents living on the north side of the main village street, who are counted within the parish of Sowton, a hamlet 1 mile to the north. Both parishes are now administered collectively as Bishop's Clyst, named after the Bishop's Court, former palace of the Bishop of Exeter, situated between them.

The village of Clyst St Mary itself has three main areas:

- the old village, site of the school, village hall, shop/post office and pubs;
- the Winslade Park estate - in the grounds of the old manor house, across the A3052, home to the majority of the population and the old church
- the Cat and Fiddle mobile home park, 1 mile (1.6 km) east of the old village.

Additionally the parish includes various outlying farms and hamlets.

Historically, the village was recorded in the Domesday Book as 'Bishop's Cliste' and is best known for its late 12th-century bridge across the River Clyst, long the main route between Exeter and London. Rebuilt in 1310, it is the oldest bridge in Devon and for over seven hundred years constituted part of the main road connection between Exeter and London.

== Battle of Clyst St Mary ==
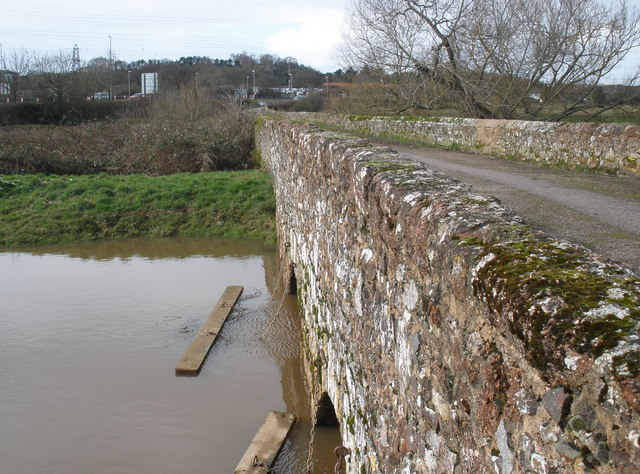
The medieval bridge over the River Clyst at Clyst St. Mary

Clyst St Mary was the site of one of the decisive battles in the 1549 Prayer Book Rebellion, when West Country resistance to the Protestant Reformation was quashed. After the Battle of Woodbury Common on 4 August 1549, the rebels under the control of Humphrey Arundell had re-grouped with the main contingent of 6,000 at Clyst St Mary, but on 5 August were attacked by a central force led by Sir William Francis, under the control of John Russell, 1st Earl of Bedford. After a ferocious battle Russell's troops gained the advantage leaving a thousand Cornish and Devonians dead and many more taken prisoner, 900 of whom were massacred later that day at Clyst Heath. The village was burned and many of the combatants and villagers drowned in the river.

== Education ==
Clyst St Mary has its own primary school, Clyst St Mary Primary School, established in the 1830s. The school catchment area now includes the hamlets of Sowton and Farringdon as well as some neighbouring villages and many of the families of Exeter City F.C. players, who train nearby.

Older children from Clyst St Mary attend senior school at either Exmouth Community College or Clyst Vale Community College in Broadclyst. Many undertake A-level's at either Exeter College or Clyst Vale.

== Business, commerce and employment prospects ==
Langdon's Business Park is the only industrialised area within Clyst St. Mary.

There is also a large office complex in Winslade Park, the site of the original manor house and, subsequently, a boarding school. The complex was initially developed by the London & Manchester group, later this site was taken over by the Friends Provident group. Apart from the refurbishment of the old school (Winslade House) in the 1980s there was a development of newer buildings on the adjacent land of Grindle House. These buildings house the Devon region DEFRA offices (in Clyst House). Winslade Park is the name for the grounds containing Winslade House, Clyst House and the other facilities here. Much of the original estate was redeveloped in the 1960s as the Winslade Park Estate.

== Twin towns ==
Clyst St Mary is twinned with:

- Merville-Franceville-Plage, France
