= Dave Chisnall =

English darts player (born 1980)

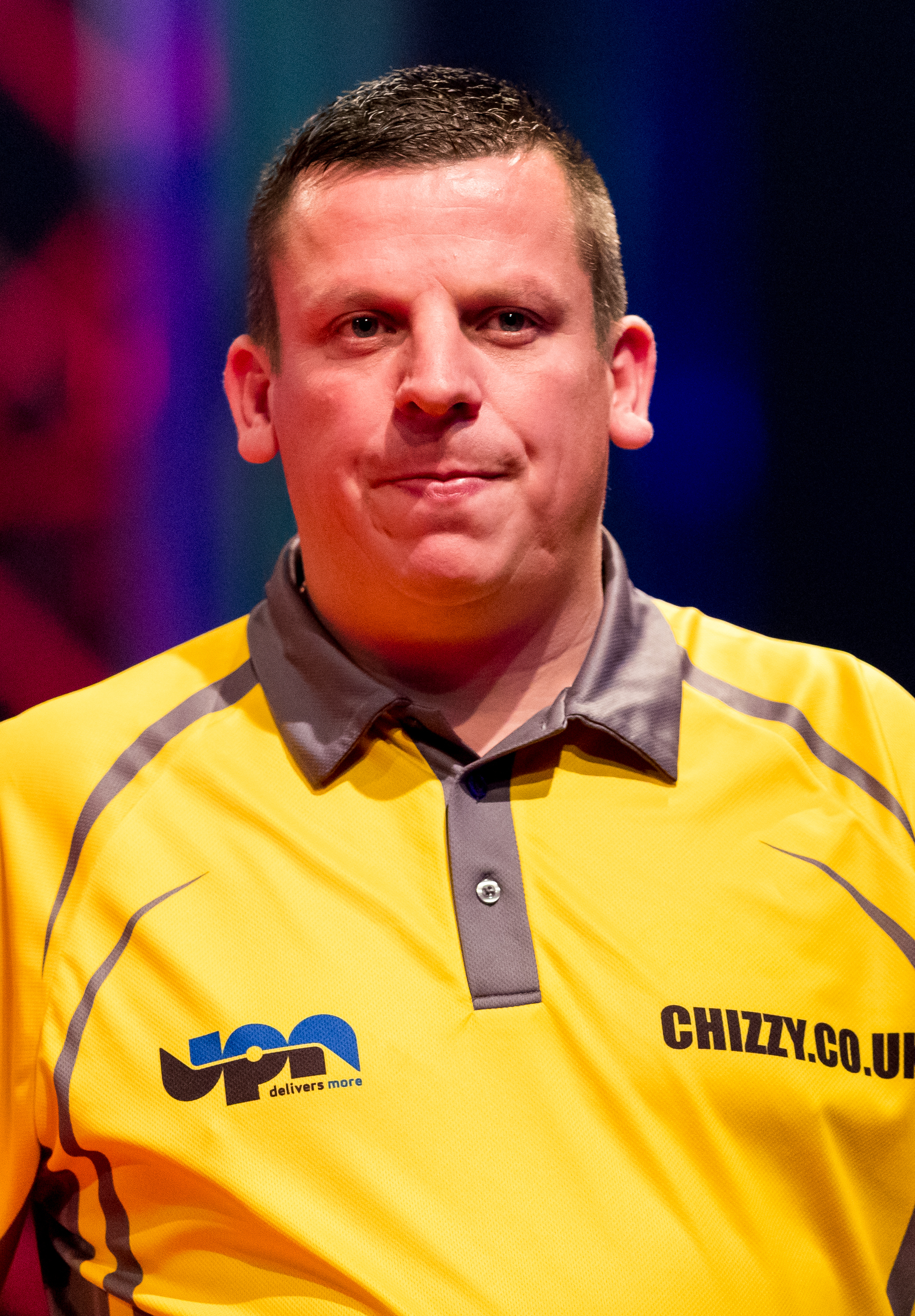
- Chisnall in 2019

Personal information
- Full name: David Chisnall
- Nickname: "Chizzy"
- Born: 12 September 1980 (age 46) St Helens, Merseyside, England
- Home town: Morecambe, Lancashire, England

Sport
- Sport: Darts
- Playing since: 1997
- Darts: 23g Harrows Signature
- Laterality: Right-handed
- Walk-on music: "Dizzy" by Vic Reeves and The Wonder Stuff "Johnny Däpp" by Dominik de Leon and Matthias Distel (European Tour events)

Organisation (see split in darts)
- BDO: 2007–2011
- PDC: 2011–present (Tour Card: 2011–present)
- Current world ranking: (PDC) 31 ▼2 (5 November 2026)

WDF major events – best performances
- World Championship: Runner-up: 2010
- World Masters: Last 40: 2010

PDC premier events – best performances
- World Championship: Semi-final: 2021
- World Matchplay: Quarter-final: 2013, 2014, 2015, 2016, 2018
- World Grand Prix: Runner-up: 2013, 2019
- UK Open: Semi-final: 2012
- Grand Slam: Runner-up: 2014
- European Championship: Quarter-final: 2014, 2015, 2019, 2022
- Premier League: Semi-final: 2015
- PC Finals: Runner-up: 2016
- Masters: Runner-up: 2016, 2022
- Champions League: Group Stage: 2017, 2018
- World Series Finals: Semi-final: 2016, 2019

Other tournament wins
- Years
PDC Pro Tour (×26)
European Tour (×8): 2013 German Darts Championship; 2019 Danish Darts Open; 2022 Belgian Darts Open; 2023 Baltic Sea Darts Open; 2023 Dutch Darts Championship; 2023 Hungarian Darts Trophy; 2024 European Darts Open; 2024 Flanders Darts Trophy
Players Championships (×18): 2011 (×1); 2012 (x5); 2013 (×2); 2015 (×1); 2016 (×1); 2017 (×1); 2019 (×2); 2022 (×1); 2023 (×2); 2024 (×2)

Other achievements
- 2012 Best PDC Newcomer; 2013, 2023, 2024 PDC Pro Tour Player of the Year

David Chisnall (born 12 September 1980) is an English professional darts player who competes in Professional Darts Corporation (PDC) events, where he reached a peak ranking of world number five in 2017 and 2024. Nicknamed "Chizzy", he began his career in the British Darts Organisation (BDO) and was the runner-up in the 2010 BDO World Championship. He switched to the PDC a year later where he has since won 26 PDC Pro Tour titles, reached six PDC major finals and represented England at the PDC World Cup on three occasions, making the semi-finals twice.

Chisnall is a two-time runner-up at both the PDC Masters and the World Grand Prix, with his best performance at the PDC World Championship being reaching the semi-finals at the 2021 edition.

== Career ==
=== Early career ===
Chisnall was brought up in St Helens and played for a local football team until he was 17 when he broke his foot. He switched to darts and first played in a friend's bedroom, throwing 180 on his first ever visit to the board.

His debut in BDO events came at the 2004 Welsh Open, losing in the last 32 to Alan Tabern. In 2007 he won the BDO Gold Cup, beating Scotland captain Mike Veitch in the semi-finals, and Welshman Matthew Quinlan in the final. Chisnall then fell two games short of qualifying for the 2008 BDO World Championship, losing to Robert Thornton. A few days later Chisnall was again beaten by Thornton in the Winmau World Masters.

In 2008, Chisnall won the Isle of Man Open, beating Ted Hankey in the quarter-finals and Gary Robson in the semis before defeating Robert Hughes in the final. After his match against Hankey, the 2000 BDO World Champion advised Chisnall to turn professional. He later went on to win the England National Championship.

Chisnall won one of five qualification spots for the 2009 BDO World Championship, beating Stewart Rattray to qualify. The next day he took part in the 2008 World Masters but lost in the first round to fellow Lakeside qualifier Daryl Gurney. In the World Championship, Chisnall gave Martin Adams a tough match, losing 3–5 in the deciding set to the number 3 seed.

=== BDO Breakthrough ===
In September 2009, Chisnall won back-to-back titles claiming the Welsh Masters with a 5–1 victory over Tony O'Shea, and the British Open, knocking out BDO World Champion Ted Hankey in the earlier rounds before beating Martin Atkins 2–0 in the final. These successes helped him finish top of the BDO International Grand Prix Series.

He competed in the qualifying rounds for the 2010 BDO World Championship but was beaten by Stuart Kellett. He did, however, qualify through the BDO Invitational Rankings (ironically, Kellett himself failed to qualify).

He produced an outstanding run to reach the final of the 2010 World Championship beating number four seed Darryl Fitton in the opening round and Tony West in the second round. Having been 4–1 down to defending champion and number five seed Ted Hankey, Chisnall produced a comeback to reach the semi-finals 5–4. After losing the first two sets in the semi-final against top seed Tony O'Shea, he came back again to win 6–3 and reached his first World Championship final, where he was defeated 7–5 by number three seed, and Masters champion, Martin Adams.

Chisnall qualified for the 2010 Grand Slam of Darts as a result of his World Championship final, winning his first match against Simon Whitlock before subsequent defeats by Robert Thornton and Colin Osborne saw him exit the tournament. In the 2011 BDO World Darts Championship he lost 4–1 in sets in the second round to Gary Robson.

=== PDC career ===
Chisnall entered the Professional Darts Corporation Q School in January 2011. He won a PDC tour card on the first day by defeating Terry Temple 6–2 in his final match. He played in his first PDC event in Halle, Germany and hit a nine-dart finish but went on to lose to Vincent van der Voort 6–5 in the last 64. In the Derby Pro Tour events he reached the quarter-finals on both days of the weekend but was defeated by Jamie Caven 6–3 and Wes Newton 6–4 respectively. A month later at the second UK Open Qualifier of the year Chisnall reached his first PDC final where he was edged out 6–5 by Michael Smith in the final, but the result did ensure him spot at the UK Open. He hit his second nine-darter of the season in the seventh UK open qualifier. In the Eddie Cox memorial Players Championship in Barnsley he reached the semi-finals after defeating Dennis Ovens, Mark Walsh and John Part before a subsequent defeat by Paul Nicholson 6–5 after missing five darts for the match. The following day in the Bobby Bourn Memorial Players Championship he got to the final before being beaten by Andy Smith by 6 legs to 2. Despite the loss he had done enough to qualify for the World Matchplay in his debut season on the tour.

At the UK Open he entered the competition in the third round and defeated Richard North 9–2 and Ronnie Baxter 9–7 whilst hitting a 102 average. He went on to defeat John Bowles in the fifth round 9–4, before losing to eventual runner-up Wes Newton 10–8 in the quarter-finals. Chisnall lost in the first round of the 2011 World Matchplay 10–3 against Mark Walsh, but still broke into the top 50 in the order of merit for the first time. He defeated Jelle Klaasen in the first round of the European Championship, but then lost 10–5 against Adrian Lewis in a match where both players averaged over 100. In September, Chisnall reached the final of the fourth Dutch Players Championship of the year and lost 6–4 to Richie Burnett. Chisnall was defeated 2–1 in the first round of the 2011 Grand Prix by Alan Tabern after missing 13 darts at doubles to win the match, a television record which stood until 2013.

He won his first PDC title at a Players Championship event in Crawley by defeating Justin Pipe 6–4 in the final. He then reached the quarter-finals of the Players Championship Finals after avenging his loss to Alan Tabern at the World Grand Prix, beating Co Stompé before losing 9–8 to Mark Webster in a tight game.

=== 2012 ===
Chisnall defeated Mark Dudbridge 3–0 to make the perfect start to his first PDC World Championship at the 2012 edition. He played 15-time World Champion Phil Taylor in the second round and produced a stunning performance to win 4–1 and set up a last 16 meeting with Andy Hamilton. The only other players to have beaten Taylor in the PDC World Championship outside of the final, Wayne Mardle and Mark Webster, both went on to lose their following matches, and Chisnall joined this club as he was whitewashed 4–0 by Hamilton. His exploits in 2011 and in the World Championship saw him named PDC Best Newcomer at the annual awards ceremony on 3 January.

Chisnall began the year with an exceptional start on the tour reaching the final of the second UK Open qualifier, where he lost 6–1 to Michael van Gerwen, who hit a nine-dart finish during the match. He then reached the final of the fourth Players Championship after whitewashing Andy Hamilton in the quarter-finals and defeating Steve Beaton in the semi to face Phil Taylor in a repeat of their World Championship clash. He defeated Taylor 6–5 to maintain his 100% record against him and claimed his second professional PDC title. He won the next Players Championship too, defeating the likes of Raymond van Barneveld and Terry Jenkins, before sealing the title with a 6–2 win over Ian White. The very next day, Chisnall won the third title of his season at the sixth Players Championship event with a 6–4 success over Justin Pipe in the final. During the European Tour Event 1 in Austria, Chisnall scored eight maximums, and four 140s to hit a 113.09 average in a 6–3 win over Kevin Painter, before losing to James Wade in the semi-finals.

Chisnall enjoyed comfortable wins over Mark Layton, Dennis Smith, Simon Whitlock and Raymond van Barneveld to reach his first PDC major event semi-final at the UK Open. He faced Robert Thornton, but with the scores level at 2–2 early on Chisnall lost seven of the next eight legs and would bow out of the event with a 10–4 defeat. In the second European Tour event of the season Chisnall reached the final having earlier posted a 108.35 average in his second round match against Michael Rosenauer. He also beat Terry Jenkins, Mervyn King and Whitlock to play Taylor in the final. There Chisnall suffered his first defeat by Taylor, losing 6–2. The performance saw him break into the top 16 on the PDC Order of Merit for the first time, meaning he gained automatic qualification into the World Matchplay. Chisnall then won his fourth Players Championship of the year in Crawley with a 6–4 victory over Ronnie Baxter. He lost his second successive European Tour final at Event 3 in Düsseldorf following a 6–4 defeat by van Barneveld. His average of 82.16 in the final was the lowest of his tournament by over 10 points. Chisnall then suffered a 10–7 first round defeat by Baxter in the first round of the World Matchplay, and lost 3–1 in sets in the second round of the World Grand Prix to Mervyn King. Chisnall qualified from Group 6 of the Championship League and finished fourth in the Winners Group to reach the play-offs on leg difference over Justin Pipe and Baxter who, like Chisnall, had won three of their seven league games. In the semi-finals he faced Taylor and was whitewashed 6–0 with his opponent averaging 112.73. But he then beat Taylor 6–3 in the final of the 19th Players Championship, with Chisnall this time scoring the higher average of 111.80 to Taylor's 105.57. He also beat the in-form Michael van Gerwen in the semi-finals, with the title securing his place atop the ProTour Order of Merit and therefore he was the number one seed for the Players Championship Finals, where he was surprisingly whitewashed 6–0 by Wayne Jones in the first round. Chisnall was later named the Best PDC Pro Tour Player for his five tournament victories in 2012.

=== 2013 ===
Chisnall lost in the last 16 of the World Championship for the second successive year in 2013. He came from a set down three times against Simon Whitlock to force a deciding set which he led 3–2, before Whitlock took out a crucial 152 finish and then won two successive legs to knock Chisnall out. He reached the final of the first UK Open Qualifier of the year, but lost 6–2 to Michael van Gerwen. At the UK Open itself he lost 9–2 to James Wade in the fourth round, and at the European Championship he was whitewashed 6–0 by Jamie Caven in the first round who averaged 106. At the World Matchplay he saw off Paul Nicholson 10–8 and gained revenge over Caven by defeating him 13–10 to reach the quarter-finals of the event for the first time. He played Michael van Gerwen and had chances to move 7–3 ahead but missed and even though he took out a finish of 144 and had an 11 dart leg he was beaten 16–11. In September, Chisnall won his first title since November last year at the German Darts Championship. He required deciding legs to advance through each of his first four matches, before beating Steve Beaton 6–4 in the semi-finals with an average of 106.30 and Peter Wright 6–2 in the final. He called the title the highlight of his career to date and moved up to a career high seventh on the Order of Merit. Chisnall faced Wright in a final for the second consecutive tournament at the seventh Players Championship of the season in Barnsley and won again, this time by a 6–5 scoreline.

At the World Grand Prix Chisnall reached his first PDC major final in the event where every leg must be started and finished by hitting a double. He beat Ian White 2–1 and Wayne Jones 3–1 in the first two rounds. In the quarter-finals Chisnall produced the match of his career to date against Michael van Gerwen. He led the Dutchman 2–0 and missed a dart to win 3–1 as the match was levelled at 2–2. However, Chisnall kept his composure to win the deciding set with a match total of ten 180s to Van Gerwen's two. Chisnall played the slow-paced Justin Pipe in the semi-finals and struggled for rhythm early on as he trailed 2–1. From there he only conceded two more legs as he won 5–2 and faced ten-time winner of the event Taylor in the final. Chisnall had a disaster as he lost each of the five opening sets without winning a leg. He finally won his first leg of the match at the start of the sixth set when Taylor could not hit an opening double. The usually prolific 180 hitter Chisnall scored his first two legs later but it was not enough as Taylor won the match 6–0. Afterwards Chisnall called it the best and worst night of his career. His run did earn him a spot in the Grand Slam of Darts, but he lost all three of his games against Michael Smith, Ted Hankey and Scott Waites to finish bottom of Group H. Later in the month, Chisnall won his third title of the year at the 15th Players Championship by beating Robert Thornton 6–3.

=== 2014 ===
Chisnall fought back from 2–0 down in the first round of the 2014 World Championship against John Henderson to level at 2–2. However, he missed a total of four darts to win the match during the deciding set to suffer a shock defeat. Despite his early exit, Chisnall played in his first Premier League this year as he was awarded a PDC wildcard for the event. He won his opening night's match 7–5 against Robert Thornton, but only won a total of two more after this and finished the season with five successive losses to be placed seventh in the table. At the World Matchplay Chisnall defeated Dean Winstanley 10–4 and Andy Hamilton 13–10 to set up a quarter-final clash with Michael van Gerwen which he led 3–0, however he lost 16–12 in a tight game. At the Singapore Darts Masters, Chisnall beat Phil Taylor 10–6, before losing 11–6 to Simon Whitlock in the semi-finals. Chisnall was knocked out in the quarter-finals of successive major events the European Championship and the Masters by Van Gerwen.

At the Grand Slam, Chisnall topped his group to earn a place in the knockout stages where he beat former roommate Robbie Green 10–3 and youngster Keegan Brown 16–14 having been 8–2 and 12–6 behind to set up a semi-final clash with Kim Huybrechts. In a match which Chisnall led 4–1 and trailed 14–12, he won four of the last five legs to play in his second major PDC final. He faced the same opponent as the first in Phil Taylor and got off to a bad start as he lost each of the opening five legs. Chisnall fought back to level at 10–10, but Taylor pulled away again to lead 15–10 and went on to win 16–13. Chisnall played in the final of the 19th Players Championship a week later and lost 6–2 against Ian White.

=== 2015 ===
Chisnall was beaten by a lower ranked player at the World Championship for the second year in a row as world number 50 Benito van de Pas eliminated him 4–2 in round two, with Chisnall missing one dart to level at 3–3. At the UK Open he fell 7–0 behind Stephen Bunting in the fourth round, before pulling the gap back to 8–6. Chisnall missed one dart to further reduce the deficit in the next leg and would lose 9–6.

In successive Premier League weeks, Chisnall averaged 107.01 in beating Kim Huybrechts 7–4 and then set his highest televised average of 110.78 during a 7–2 win over Gary Anderson. He then went on to smash his own personal record by defeating James Wade 7–1 with an average of 114.17 in week 10. Chisnall went into the final round of fixtures needing a win over Michael van Gerwen to top the table, but drew 6–6. He had a 7–4 advantage over Gary Anderson in the semi-finals, but the match went into a deciding leg in which Chisnall missed three match darts to be beaten 10–9. Chisnall lost in the final of the 10th Players Championship 6–4 to Joe Murnan. He won his first title in 18 months in the next event by beating Ian White 6–1. Chisnall was knocked out in the quarter-finals of the World Matchplay for the third year in a row, this time 16–8 to Taylor. He reached the final of the European Darts Matchplay, but lost 6–4 to Van Gerwen. Chisnall forced a deciding leg against White from 5–1 down in the final of the 17th Players Championship but lost it to be edged out 6–5. Wins over Mensur Suljović and Stephen Bunting saw Chisnall reach the quarter-finals of the European Championship for the second year in a row, but he was beaten 10–4 by Van Gerwen. He hit his first televised nine-dart finish during a group stage match 5–2 victory over Peter Wright at the Grand Slam. Chisnall went on to be eliminated in the second round of the event 10–7 by Michael Smith. His fifth major quarter-final of the year followed at the Players Championship Finals with Van Gerwen again beating him, this time 10–7 despite Chisnall averaging 105.51.

=== 2016 ===
Chisnall's third round 2016 World Championship game with Peter Wright went to a deciding set. Chisnall missed one match dart, but then took out a 130 checkout to save the game after Wright had missed a match dart of his own. However, Wright broke once more and, after Chisnall missed double top to complete a 125 finish, he won the match 4–3. The defeat meant that Chisnall is yet to reach a quarter-final in a PDC World Championship. Chisnall recovered from an 8–0 deficit in the first round of the Masters to beat Robert Thornton 10–9 and then came past Kim Huybrechts 10–5 and James Wade 11–6 to reach the final. However, he would lose his third PDC major final 11–6 to Michael van Gerwen. He lost 9–7 to Gary Anderson in the third round of the UK Open after being 7–5 up. After whitewashing Thornton 7–0 on the opening night of the Premier League, Chisnall could not pick another win from his next eight matches to finish 9th in the table and be relegated from the competition.

Chisnall was beaten in the final of back-to-back European Tour events, 6–2 by Van Gerwen at the Gibraltar Darts Trophy and 6–5 by James Wade at the European Matchplay (missed one match dart after coming back from 4–1 down). His first title of the year came at the 10th Players Championship courtesy of defeating Steve Beaton 6–2. Chisnall was eliminated in the quarter-finals of the World Matchplay for the fourth year in a row this time 16–9 to Van Gerwen and the world number one was also the victor when they met in the final of the Perth Darts Masters, overcoming Chisnall 11–4. Another meeting with Van Gerwen came in the semi-finals of the World Grand Prix and, with Chisnall 2–1 up in sets, the fourth set went to a deciding leg in which Van Gerwen threw a double start 10-darter and went on to win 4–2. He lost in the final of the last Players Championship 6–1 to Benito van de Pas. After not getting out of his group at the Grand Slam, Chisnall won through to the final of the Players Championship Finals, surviving three match darts from Jelle Klaasen along the way. It was his fourth defeat in a major final as Michael van Gerwen triumphed 11–3.

=== 2017 ===
Jelle Klaasen was 3–1 down to Chisnall in the third round of the 2017 World Championship, before winning the next set and the first two legs of the sixth. Chisnall then took three legs in a row to win 4–2 and reach the quarter-finals of a PDC World Championship for the first time, where he faced reigning two-time champion Gary Anderson. Chisnall took the first two legs of the seventh set with the match at 3–3, but missed four darts to win it and Anderson would go on to triumph 5–3. Chisnall threw 21 180s, the joint highest ever in a PDC match and 33 were hit in total, one short of the record. Chisnall lost 6–3 in the final of the fifth Players Championship to Adrian Lewis. Chisnall made his first appearance at the 2017 World Cup as he was the second highest English player on the Order of Merit behind Lewis. They made it through to the semi-finals, but were unable to win either of their singles matches against the Dutch team of Michael van Gerwen and Raymond van Barneveld.

=== 2019 ===
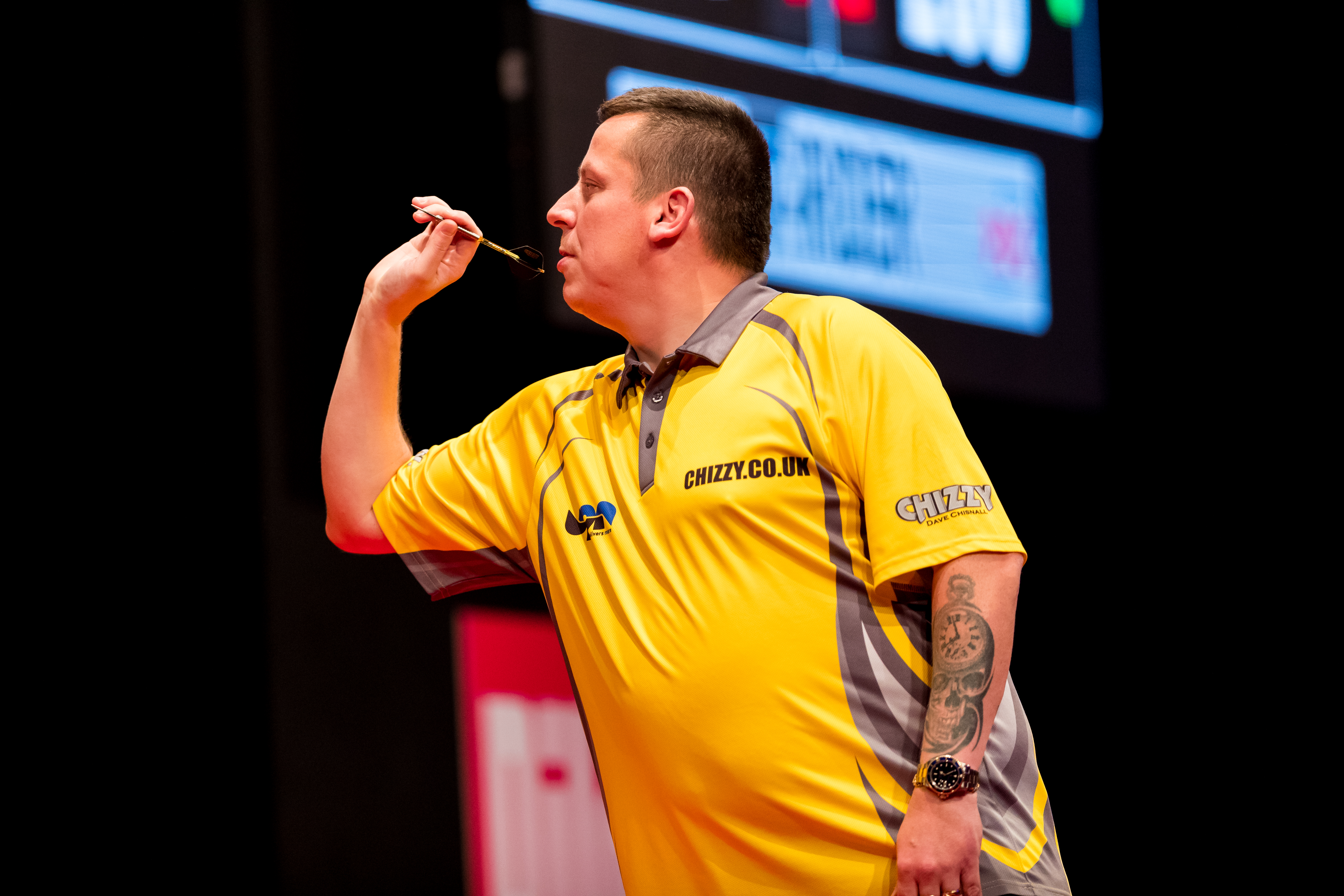
Chisnall at the 2019 European Darts Matchplay

In the World Championship, Chisnall whitewashed Kim Huybrechts and Jamie Lewis 4–0 to reach the quarter-finals, where he was defeated 2–5 by Gary Anderson. In the 2019 World Grand Prix, Chisnall defeated Gerwyn Price 2–1, whitewashed Stephen Bunting 3–0, beat Nathan Aspinall 3–1, and won 4–1 against Glen Durrant to reach the final, but was defeated in the final 5–2 by Michael van Gerwen.

=== 2021 ===
Chisnall reached the semi-finals of the 2021 World Championship, his first semi-final appearance at the WDC. He was again defeated by Gary Anderson though, this time 3–6.

=== 2022 ===
In 2022, Chisnall reached the final of the Masters. He was defeated in the final by Joe Cullen 9–11.

On the European Tour Chisnall won the 2022 Belgian Darts Open (ET12). He beat Nathan Aspinall 6–4 in the third round and José de Sousa 6–2 at the quarter-final stage before defeating Danny Noppert 7–4 hitting a nine-dart finish en route. Chisnall won the final 8–6 against Andrew Gilding.

=== 2023 ===
In the second round of the World Championship, Chisnall came from a set behind to defeat Andrew Gilding 3–1. He was then defeated in the third round by Stephen Bunting 2–4.

Chisnall won three titles on the European Tour. He won the Baltic Sea Darts Open, Dutch Darts Championship, and the Hungarian Darts Trophy. He was also the runner up at the Czech Darts Open, losing 8–6 to Peter Wright in the final.

=== 2024 ===
In the World Championship, Chisnall made it to the quarter-finals, losing 5–1 in sets to eventual winner Luke Humphries.

At the 2024 UK Open, Chisnall reached the sixth round, where he was drawn to play World Championship runner-up Luke Littler. Littler won the match 10–5. At the World Matchplay, Chisnall suffered his worst defeat at the event by losing 10–2 to Krzysztof Ratajski in the first round, with the match ending in time for the crowd in attendance to watch the UEFA Euro 2024 final.

On the 2024 PDC Pro Tour, Chisnall won Players Championship 6, defeating Dirk van Duijvenbode 8–6 in the final. He also won Players Championship 23 after beating Chris Dobey 8–4 in the final. He won two titles on the European Tour at the European Darts Open and the Flanders Darts Trophy, becoming the fourth player to claim eight European Tour titles in total. In October, Chisnall reached a joint-career high of fifth in the PDC World Rankings.

=== 2025–present ===
At the 2025 World Championship, Chisnall was beaten in his opening match by Ricky Evans after losing a sudden death leg. He reached his only Pro Tour final of the year at Players Championship 15, where he lost 8–4 to Krzysztof Ratajski. Following a run of nine consecutive defeats on the 2-25 European Tour, Chisnall failed to qualify for the 2025 World Grand Prix, his first time missing the event since 2011.

At the 2026 World Championship, Chisnall won 3–0 in his opening match against Fallon Sherrock. In the second round, he recovered from 2–0 down to take Ricardo Pietreczko to a deciding set, but missed a match dart before losing 3–2.

== Personal life ==
He met his wife Michaela, who also plays darts, at the St. Anne's Open in 2008. They married on Saturday 14 January 2017 in Morecambe. In September 2011, she gave birth to their first daughter; in October 2021, they welcomed their son. Chisnall is originally from St Helens but now lives in Morecambe. Chisnall is a supporter of Liverpool Football Club.

== Career finals ==
=== BDO major finals: 1 ===
Outcome	No.	Year	Championship	Opponent in the final	Score
Runner-up	1.	2010	World Championship	(England) Martin Adams	5–7 (s)

=== PDC major finals: 6 ===
Legend
World Grand Prix (0–2)
Grand Slam (0–1)
Masters (0–2)
Players Championship Finals (0–1)

Outcome	No.	Year	Championship	Opponent in the final	Score (Note: (l) = score in legs, (s) = score in sets.)
Runner-up	1.	2013	World Grand Prix	Phil Taylor	0–6 (s)
Runner-up	2.	2014	Grand Slam	Phil Taylor	13–16 (l)
Runner-up	3.	2016	Masters	Michael van Gerwen	6–11 (l)
Runner-up	4.	2016	Players Championship Finals	Michael van Gerwen	3–11 (l)
Runner-up	5.	2019	World Grand Prix (2)	Michael van Gerwen	2–5 (s)
Runner-up	6.	2022	Masters (2)	Joe Cullen	9–11 (l)

=== PDC World Series finals: 2 ===
Outcome	No.	Year	Championship	Opponent in the final	Score
Runner-up	1.	2016	Perth Darts Masters	Michael van Gerwen	4–11 (l)
Runner-up	2.	2017	Shanghai Darts Masters	Michael van Gerwen	0–8 (l)

== World Championship performances ==
=== BDO World Championship ===
- 2009: First round (lost to Martin Adams 2–3)
- 2010: Runner up (lost to Martin Adams 5–7)
- 2011: Second round (lost to Gary Robson 1–4)

=== PDC World Championship ===
- 2012: Third round (lost to Andy Hamilton 0–4)
- 2013: Third round (lost to Simon Whitlock 3–4)
- 2014: First round (lost to John Henderson 2–3)
- 2015: Second round (lost to Benito van de Pas 2–4)
- 2016: Third round (lost to Peter Wright 3–4)
- 2017: Quarter-finals (lost to Gary Anderson 3–5)
- 2018: First round (lost to Vincent van der Voort 0–3)
- 2019: Quarter-finals (lost to Gary Anderson 2–5)
- 2020: Third round (lost to Jeffrey de Zwaan 3–4)
- 2021: Semi-finals (lost to Gary Anderson 3–6)
- 2022: Third round (withdrew – COVID-19)
- 2023: Third round (lost to Stephen Bunting 2–4)
- 2024: Quarter-finals (lost to Luke Humphries 1–5)
- 2025: Second round (lost to Ricky Evans 2–3)
- 2026: Second round (lost to Ricardo Pietreczko 2–3)

== Performance timeline ==
=== BDO ===
Tournament	2007	2008	2009	2010	2011
BDO Ranked televised events
World Championship	DNP		1R	F	2R
World Masters	3R	1R	DNP	4R	PDC

=== PDC ===
Tournament	2010	2011	2012	2013	2014	2015	2016	2017	2018	2019	2020	2021	2022	2023	2024	2025	2026
PDC Ranked televised events
World Championship	DNP		3R	3R	1R	2R	3R	QF	1R	QF	3R	SF	3R	3R	QF	2R	2R
World Masters (Note: A non-ranked event until 2025)	BDO	Not held		1R	QF	QF	F	1R	1R	SF	QF	QF	F	2R	QF	1R	1R
UK Open	BDO	QF	SF	4R	4R	4R	3R	4R	3R	6R	4R	QF	5R	4R	6R	5R	5R
World Matchplay	BDO	1R	1R	QF	QF	QF	QF	2R	QF	1R	1R	2R	2R	1R	1R	1R	1R
World Grand Prix	BDO	1R	2R	F	1R	2R	SF	2R	QF	F	SF	QF	1R	1R	2R	DNQ	1R
European Championship	BDO	2R	2R	1R	QF	QF	1R	2R	2R	QF	1R	DNQ	QF	1R	1R	1R	1R
Grand Slam (Note: A non-ranked event until 2015)	RR	RR	DNQ	RR	F	2R	RR	2R	DNQ	QF	2R	DNQ	RR	RR	RR	DNQ	
Players Championship Finals	BDO	QF	1R	1R	1R	QF	F	2R	2R	2R	1R	1R	2R	3R	2R	1R	
PDC Non-ranked televised events
Premier League	BDO	Did not participate			7th	SF	9th	5th	Did not participate								
World Cup	BDO	NH	Did not participate					SF	QF	DNP		SF	DNP				
World Series Finals	Not held					2R	SF	DNQ	QF	SF	1R	1R	2R	DNQ	1R	2R	DNQ
PDC Past major events
Champions League	BDO	Not held					DNQ	RR	RR	DNQ	Not held						
Championship League	BDO	DNQ	SF	RR	Not held												
Career statistics
Season-end ranking	-	32	7	8	9	10	7	8	12	10	6	13	18	10	6	22	

==== European Tour ====
Season	1	2	3	4	5	6	7	8	9	10	11	12	13	14	15
2012	ADO; SF	GDC; F	EDO; F	GDM; 1R	DDM; 1R										
2013	UKM; 3R	EDT; 1R	EDO; 2R	ADO; 3R	GDT; SF	GDC; W	GDM; 3R	DDM; 2R							
2014	GDC; 2R	DDM; QF	GDM; 3R	ADO; 2R	GDT; 3R	EDO; QF	EDG; QF	EDT; 2R							
2015	Did not qualify			DDM; 3R	IDO; QF	EDO; 2R	EDT; QF	EDM; F	EDG; 2R						
2016	DDM; QF	GDM; 3R	GDT; F	EDM; F	ADO; 3R	EDO; 2R	IDO; 3R	EDT; 3R	EDG; WD	GDC; SF					
2017	GDC; 3R	GDM; DNP	GDO; 3R	EDG; SF	GDT; 3R	EDM; QF	ADO; DNP	EDO; QF	DDM; DNP	GDG; 2R	IDO; 3R	EDT; QF			
2018	EDO; 3R	GDG; 2R	GDO; 3R	ADO; WD	EDG; QF	DDM; 2R	GDT; 2R	DDO; DNP	EDM; DNP	GDC; QF	DDC; 3R	IDO; 2R	EDT; QF		
2019	EDO; 3R	GDC; 2R	GDG; 3R	GDO; SF	ADO; 2R	EDG; WD	DDM; QF	DDO; W	CDO; DNP	ADC; 3R	EDM; SF	IDO; WD	GDT; F		
2020	BDC; DNP	GDC; QF	EDG; 2R	IDO; 3R											
2022	IDO; DNQ	GDC; 3R	GDG; 2R	ADO; DNQ	EDO; 3R	CDO; 3R	EDG; DNQ	DDC; 3R	EDM; DNP	HDT; SF	GDO; 3R	BDO; W	GDT; 2R		
2023	BSD; W	EDO; 3R	IDO; 3R	GDG; 3R	ADO; 2R	DDC; W	BDO; 3R	CDO; F	EDG; 3R	EDM; 2R	GDO; 3R	HDT; W	GDC; 2R		
2024	BDO; 2R	GDG; 3R	IDO; 2R	EDG; 3R	ADO; 3R	BSD; 2R	DDC; 3R	EDO; W	GDC; SF	FDT; W	HDT; 3R	SDT; 2R	CDO; 2R		
2025	BDO; QF	EDT; 3R	IDO; 3R	GDG; 3R	ADO; 3R	EDG; 2R	DDC; 2R	EDO; 2R	BSD; 2R	FDT; 2R	CDO; 2R	HDT; 2R	SDT; 2R	GDC; QF	
2026	PDO; 1R	EDT; 2R	BDO; 2R	GDG; 2R	EDG; 2R	ADO; 1R	IDO; 2R	BSD; QF	SDO; 2R	EDO; DNQ	HDT; QF	DNQ		SDT; 2R	DDC; 2R

==== Players Championships ====
Season	1	2	3	4	5	6	7	8	9	10	11	12	13	14	15	16	17	18	19	20	21	22	23	24	25	26	27	28	29	30	31	32	33	34
2011	HAL; 2R	HAL; 2R	DER; QF	DER; QF	CRA; 2R	CRA; 2R	VIE; 3R	VIE; 2R	CRA; 2R	CRA; 2R	BAR; SF	BAR; F	NUL; 3R	NUL; 1R	ONT; DNP		DER; 1R	DER; 3R	NUL; QF	NUL; F	DUB; 2R	DUB; 2R	KIL; DNP	GLA; 4R	GLA; 2R	ALI; SF	ALI; 1R	CRA; 1R	CRA; W	WIG; QF	WIG; QF			
2012	ALI; 1R	ALI; QF	REA; QF	REA; W	CRA; W	CRA; W	BIR; 2R	BIR; 4R	CRA; W	CRA; 2R	BAR; 3R	BAR; 3R	DUB; 3R	DUB; SF	KIL; 3R	KIL; 2R	CRA; 4R	CRA; SF	BAR; W	BAR; 4R														
2013	WIG; QF	WIG; QF	WIG; 2R	WIG; 3R	CRA; QF	CRA; 3R	BAR; W	BAR; 2R	DUB; QF	DUB; 2R	KIL; SF	Did not participate			BAR; W	BAR; 2R																		
2014	BAR; 1R	BAR; 1R	CRA; 3R	CRA; QF	WIG; 1R	WIG; 3R	WIG; 2R	WIG; 1R	CRA; 2R	CRA; 3R	COV; 4R	COV; QF	CRA; 1R	CRA; QF	DUB; QF	DUB; 1R	CRA; 3R	CRA; 3R	COV; F	COV; 2R														
2015	BAR; SF	BAR; 1R	BAR; SF	BAR; 4R	BAR; 3R	COV; 4R	COV; 1R	COV; QF	CRA; 4R	CRA; F	BAR; W	BAR; 3R	WIG; 3R	WIG; 3R	BAR; SF	BAR; 4R	DUB; F	DUB; 2R	COV; 3R	COV; SF														
2016	BAR; 1R	BAR; 3R	BAR; 2R	BAR; QF	BAR; SF	BAR; 3R	BAR; SF	COV; SF	COV; QF	BAR; W	BAR; DNP			BAR; 2R	BAR; 4R	BAR; 2R	DUB; 4R	DUB; 1R	BAR; 3R	BAR; F														
2017	BAR; 4R	BAR; 1R	BAR; 4R	BAR; 1R	MIL; F	MIL; 1R	BAR; 2R	BAR; 4R	WIG; QF	WIG; 3R	MIL; 4R	MIL; 3R	WIG; 4R	WIG; 2R	BAR; DNP		BAR; 3R	BAR; W	DUB; 1R	DUB; 3R	BAR; 2R	BAR; 2R												
2018	BAR; QF	BAR; 1R	BAR; 3R	BAR; SF	MIL; 3R	MIL; F	BAR; SF	BAR; 2R	WIG; 3R	WIG; 3R	MIL; 4R	MIL; 2R	WIG; 1R	WIG; QF	BAR; 2R	BAR; QF	BAR; 4R	BAR; 1R	DUB; 2R	DUB; 3R	BAR; 2R	BAR; 2R												
2019	WIG; 2R	WIG; W	WIG; 2R	WIG; 3R	BAR; SF	BAR; 2R	WIG; W	WIG; 1R	BAR; 4R	BAR; 3R	BAR; 2R	BAR; 2R	BAR; 1R	BAR; 4R	BAR; 2R	BAR; 4R	WIG; 3R	WIG; 3R	BAR; 3R	BAR; 3R	HIL; 4R	HIL; 4R	BAR; 1R	BAR; F	BAR; 3R	BAR; 1R	DUB; 1R	DUB; 1R	BAR; QF	BAR; 2R				
2020	BAR; 1R	BAR; 3R	WIG; 2R	WIG; 1R	WIG; 2R	WIG; 1R	BAR; 4R	BAR; QF	MIL; QF	MIL; F	MIL; 2R	MIL; 2R	MIL; 1R	NIE; 3R	NIE; 2R	NIE; 4R	NIE; 2R	NIE; 3R	COV; 1R	COV; 1R	COV; 1R	COV; 2R	COV; 4R											
2021	BOL; 2R	BOL; 3R	BOL; 2R	BOL; 3R	MIL; 4R	MIL; 3R	MIL; 1R	MIL; 1R	NIE; 2R	NIE; 3R	NIE; 1R	NIE; 2R	MIL; 3R	MIL; 3R	MIL; 3R	MIL; 3R	COV; 3R	COV; 2R	COV; 2R	COV; 4R	BAR; 3R	BAR; 2R	BAR; 4R	BAR; SF	BAR; 4R	BAR; 4R	BAR; 1R	BAR; SF	BAR; 3R	BAR; 2R				
2022	BAR; 4R	BAR; 1R	WIG; 3R	WIG; QF	BAR; 1R	BAR; 1R	NIE; 2R	NIE; 2R	BAR; SF	BAR; 3R	BAR; SF	BAR; 3R	BAR; 1R	WIG; SF	WIG; 2R	NIE; 4R	NIE; 1R	BAR; QF	BAR; 4R	BAR; 4R	BAR; SF	BAR; 4R	BAR; 2R	BAR; 4R	BAR; W	BAR; 1R	BAR; 2R	BAR; 1R	BAR; SF	BAR; SF				
2023	BAR; QF	BAR; 1R	BAR; 2R	BAR; SF	BAR; 1R	BAR; QF	HIL; QF	HIL; 4R	WIG; 4R	WIG; 1R	LEI; 4R	LEI; QF	HIL; 3R	HIL; 1R	LEI; F	LEI; 2R	HIL; 2R	HIL; 1R	BAR; F	BAR; 1R	BAR; 1R	BAR; DNP	BAR; W	BAR; 1R	BAR; 2R	BAR; 1R	BAR; 1R	BAR; 1R	BAR; F	BAR; W				
2024	WIG; 1R	WIG; 1R	LEI; 1R	LEI; 4R	HIL; 2R	HIL; W	LEI; 2R	LEI; 1R	HIL; 4R	HIL; 4R	HIL; 1R	HIL; 1R	MIL; 1R	MIL; 4R	MIL; 3R	MIL; 3R	MIL; 4R	MIL; 4R	MIL; 3R	WIG; SF	WIG; F	MIL; 1R	MIL; W	WIG; 1R	WIG; QF	WIG; QF	WIG; 1R	WIG; 4R	LEI; 1R	LEI; 1R				
2025	WIG; 1R	WIG; QF	ROS; 2R	ROS; 3R	LEI; 2R	LEI; 1R	HIL; 1R	HIL; 2R	LEI; 4R	LEI; 1R	LEI; 2R	LEI; 1R	ROS; 3R	ROS; 3R	HIL; F	HIL; 3R	LEI; 1R	LEI; SF	LEI; 1R	LEI; 3R	LEI; 4R	HIL; 2R	HIL; 1R	MIL; 3R	MIL; 3R	HIL; 4R	HIL; 2R	LEI; 1R	LEI; 1R	LEI; 1R	WIG; 1R	WIG; 3R	WIG; 1R	WIG; 3R
2026	HIL; 3R	HIL; QF	WIG; 1R	WIG; 4R	LEI; QF	LEI; 1R	LEI; 2R	LEI; QF	WIG; 1R	WIG; 1R	MIL; 2R	MIL; 1R	HIL; 4R	HIL; 1R	LEI; 4R	LEI; 1R	LEI; 1R	LEI; 1R	MIL; 2R	MIL; QF	WIG; 2R	WIG; 3R	LEI; SF	LEI; 2R	HIL; 3R	HIL; 1R	LEI; 2R	LEI; 1R	ROS; 4R	ROS; 2R	ROS; 2R	ROS; 2R	LEI; 1R	LEI; 1R

Performance Table Legend
W	Won the tournament	F	Finalist	SF	Semifinalist	QF	Quarterfinalist	#R; RR; Prel.	Lost in # round Round-robin; Preliminary round	DQ	Disqualified
DNQ	Did not qualify	DNP	Did not participate	WD	Withdrew	NH	Tournament not held	#R; RR; Prel.	Lost in # round Round-robin; Preliminary round	NYF	Not yet founded

== Nine-dart finishes ==
Dave Chisnall televised nine-dart finishes
Date	Opponent	Tournament	Method	Prize
8 November 2015	(Scotland) Peter Wright	Grand Slam of Darts	3 x T20; 3 x T20; T20, T19, D12	£30,000
