= 2008 in darts =

This is a list of some of the major events and competitions in the sport of darts in 2008.

== News ==
=== January ===
- 1 – John Part wins his third world title beating 21-year-old qualifier Kirk Shepherd 7–2 in the final of the 2008 PDC World Championship.
- 5 – The 2008 BDO World Darts Championship gets underway at the Lakeside Country Club.
- 9 – James Wade is the second winner of the PDC Player of the Year Award. He also took the PDPA Player of the Year award. Sid Waddell and Dave Lanning are inducted into the PDC Hall of Fame. Other awards: Best Newcomer Mervyn King. Fans' Player of the Year Phil Taylor. Best Floor Player Raymond van Barneveld. Young Player of the Year Kirk Shepherd.
- 10 – The PDC announce the introduction of a new European Open to be held in October and a Players Championship Finals to start in January 2009.
- 13 – Mark Webster wins the 2008 Lakeside World Championship beating Simon Whitlock in the final to become the 20th name on the trophy in its history.
- 13 – Colin Osborne wins the PDC's first Pro Tour event of 2008, the North-East Regional Final of the UK Open beating Dennis Ovens 8–6 in the final.
- 14 – Wayne Mardle is announced as the eighth and final name in the 2008 Premier League line-up. He received a wildcard from broadcasters Sky Sports.
- 19 – John Part adds the first of the weekend's Players Championship titles to his World title beating Chris Mason in the Gibraltar final.
- 20 – James Wade wins his first ever Players Championship title, his fourth Pro Tour event in all. He won the second Stan James Players Championship of the weekend in Gibraltar by beating Denis Ovens in the final.
- 31 – The 2008 Premier League gets underway and Phil Taylor tastes defeat for the first time in the history of the competition. James Wade ended Taylor's three-year unbeaten run in the competition with an 8–6 win in Glasgow.

=== February ===
- 10 – Colin Lloyd takes his first PDC Pro Tour title since November 2006 by claiming the UK Open South-West Regional Final in Taunton. He beat Andy Hamilton in the final.
- 10 – Scotland's Winmau World Master Robert Thornton added the Dutch Open (WDF) title to his collection beating Dutchman Alain van Bouwel 3–0 in the Men's Final. Reigning Women's World Champion Anastasia Dobromyslova added more silverware to her collection when she won the Women's title beating Netherlands Carla Molema by 5 legs to 2.
- 17 – Yorkshire's Garry Thompson became the 14th different winner in the 14-year history of the Scottish Open. He beat Winmau World Master Robert Thornton and England captain Martin Adams on his way the final where he beat Shaun Greatbatch by 5 legs to 1. Anastasia Dobromyslova added the Scottish Open Singles title when she defeated Francis Hoenselaar by 4 legs to 2 in the women's final.
- 19 – Anastasia Dobromyslova becomes world number 1 in the WDF rankings overtaking Karin Krappen. Trina Gulliver remains third.
- 21 – A court case in the Netherlands ends with the judge unable to find enough evidence regarding an existing contract between the PDC and the organisers of the two Dutch tournaments, the International Darts League and World Darts Trophy. Without PDC players and a television agreement, the IDL is postponed indefinitely and the WDT's future remains doubtful.
- 24 – Wales win the WDF Nations Cup at the Rhydycar Leisure Centre in Merthyr Tydfil. The five man team of Robert Hughes, Gareth Holt, Wayne Warren, Martin Phillips and Mark Webster beat England 13–8 in the final.

=== March ===
- 1 – Phil Taylor picks up the Southern Players Championship title at the Brentwood Centre in Essex. He beat Chris Mason, Wayne Mardle, Adrian Lewis and James Wade to take his first PDC Pro Tour title of the year. Despite his "lack of form", it was his fifth title in his last six tournaments – with only the World Championship missing from the collection.
- 1 – Steve West wins the Finnish Open with a 5–4 final victory over Robert Wagner. Sari Nikula beat Tarja Salminen in an all-Finland final for the women's title.
- 2 – Colin Lloyd takes his second PDC Pro Tour title of the year by beating Phil Taylor in the Southern Regional Final of the UK Open in Brentwood, Essex. Four Dutch players reach the last eight of the event.
- 15 – St Helens player Alan Tabern won the North West Players Championship in Wigan beating Chris Mason in the final.
- 16 – Phil Taylor wins the North West Regional Final of the UK Open in Wigan in a deciding leg shootout against Adrian Lewis.
- 22 – The PDC Pro Tour moves to Germany for the weekend where Phil Taylor claims another Players Championship title. He beats rival Raymond van Barneveld in the final. Colin Lloyd takes the PDC tour's rollover prize of £12,400 for hitting a nine dart finish against Colin Monk.
- 23 – Phil Taylor completes a perfect weekend in Germany by winning a third successive Pro Tour title. He hit a nine dart finish in the last 16 against Ronnie Baxter and beats Wayne Jones in the final. Dave Askew also hit a nine-darter in his third round defeat to James Wade.
- 25 – Bob Anderson is confirmed as the eighth and final player in the Legends Tour due to start in May.
- 27 – Adrian Lewis misses his Premier League match against Phil Taylor in Birmingham due to illness. Terry Jenkins is asked to play twice in the night, with Lewis's match rescheduled the following week.
- 29 – Phil Taylor's successful month continues in Telford with his fourth successive Pro Tour Title – the Midland Players Championship defeating Colin Lloyd in the final.
- 30 – Phil Taylor wins his fifth successive title, all in the month of March winning the Midland Regional Final of the UK Open – the last of the eight regionals. He beat Raymond van Barneveld in the semi-final and Brendan Dolan in the Telford final.

=== April ===
- 2 – The dates are set in December for the 2008 Winmau World Masters, this year avoiding a clash with the Grand Slam of Darts.
- 5 – The British Darts Organisation announce a new BDO Grand Prix series of five events to be televised by Setanta Sports from May to September, the Welsh Open, International Open, Gold Cup, British Classic and British Open.
- 11 – The PDC announce that the qualification criteria for the 2008 Grand Slam will include the Winmau World Masters event from 2006 allowing Michael van Gerwen a place in the event.
- 12 – Phil Taylor wins a sixth successive PDC Pro Tour title by winning the Antwerp Darts Trophy. It takes his unbeaten run in floor events to 42 matches.
- 12 – Ross Montgomery wins the England Open, his first WDF ranked title, beating Gary Anderson in the final. Trina Gulliver claimed the women's title.
- 14 – Nuts TV are confirmed as the UK broadcaster for the US Open in May. Challenge broadcast the inaugural 2007 event.
- 19 – Mervyn King wins his first PDC Pro Tour title at the Scottish Players Championship in Glasgow. He ends Phil Taylor's winning streak at 44 matches in floor events and later beat Mark Dudbridge in the final. Colin Osborne achieved a nine dart finish in his first round match against Lionel Sams.
- 26 – Raymond van Barneveld wins his first PDC Pro Tour title of 2008 beating Colin Osborne in the Open Holland Masters.
- 28 – The International Darts League and World Darts Trophy are effectively killed off by the failure of an appeal by their organisers over PDC players participation agreements.

=== May ===
- 1 – The Premier League group stages end with Adrian Lewis taking the final semi-final place by holding Wayne Mardle to a draw. He joins the top 3 players in the world Phil Taylor, James Wade and Raymond van Barneveld who had already qualified.
- 11 – Anastasia Dobromyslova, the women's world champion, is amongst the Holsten Pils pub qualifiers for the PDC 2008 UK Open. Fellow BDO players, Robert Thornton and Scott Waites also qualify.
- 12 – Barry Hearn confirms that Alexandra Palace will be the venue for the PDC World Darts Championship until 2012 after signing a four-year contract with the venue.
- 18 – Phil Taylor retains his US Open title beating Colin Lloyd in the final. Lloyd's run to final guarantees him a place in the Grand Slam of Darts for the next two years.
- 18 – The Welsh Open, Setanta Sports first televised darts event from the new BDO Grand Prix, is won by Gary Anderson who beats the previous year's winner Mark Webster in the final.
- 21 – Robert Thornton joins the PDC. Thornton becomes the first high-profile switch of 2008 and following Michael van Gerwen in 2007, it's the second consecutive year that the incumbent Winmau World Masters champion has left the BDO before defending the title. Thornton was also the BDO's number one ranked player at the time of the switch.
- 24 – Dutchman Willy van der Wiel wins the Norway Open beating Scotland's Paul Hanvidge in the final. Carina Ekberg beat Scotland's Louise Hepburn in the Women's final.
- 26 – Phil Taylor wins the Premier League for the fourth successive year. He beat Adrian Lewis 11–1 in the semi-final with a 112.68 average then James Wade 16–8 with a 108.36 average. Wade had earlier defeated world number one, Raymond van Barneveld in the other semi-final.
- 30 – The BetFred League of Legends kicks off at the Circus Tavern in Purfleet. Opening night wins for Keith Deller, Dave Whitcombe and Eric Bristow, who beat Bobby George in a repeat of the 1980 World final.

=== June ===
- 5 – Women's' World Champion Anastasia Dobromyslova loses narrowly in the deciding leg of her first round match at the UK Open to World Masters Champion Robert Thornton.
- 7 – Phil Taylor hits his fourth UK Open nine dart finish in Bolton during a 9–1 win over Jamie Harvey.
- 7 – The Swiss Open title is taken by Dutchman Joey ten Berge who beat England's Dave Prins 3–2 in the final. The women's event is won by Carla Molema who beat Irina Armstrong in the Women's Final by 2 sets to 1.
- 8 – James Wade adds his third PDC major title by winning the UK Open in Bolton. He beat Gary Mawson in the final. Raymond van Barneveld beat Phil Taylor in the quarter-finals for the third successive year. The Dutchman then lost to Mawson in the semi.
- 11 – Co Stompé becomes the latest BDO player to switch to the PDC.
- 14 – Phil Taylor claims his eighth PDC Pro Tour title at the Players Championship in Bristol beating Alan Tabern in the final.
- 14 – It is confirmed that Shaun Greatbatch is diagnosed with cancer and is in hospital undergoing tests. No further details were confirmed.
- 15 – Dennis Priestley wins his first Pro Tour title since February 2007 at the second Players Championship in Bristol. He beat Kevin Painter 3–2 in the final.
- 15 – Davy Richardson won the Setanta Sports televised BDO British International defeating Scotland's Ross Montgomery by 4 sets to 1. Francis Hoenselaar took the women's title 3–2 over Patsy Fletcher.
- 20 – Week two of the BetFred League of Legends in Blackburn saw Dave Whitcombe make it two wins from two with a 7 legs to 4 victory over Bobby George who has now lost both his matches. Cliff Lazarenko got his first win of the league, beating Eric Bristow 7–3. Following his draw with Bob Anderson, Peter Evison earned his first league win with a 7–5 win over Keith Deller. On the final match of the evening, Anderson brushed aside John Lowe 7–2. Lowe has also lost both his matches.
- 23 – John Raby passes away after a long battle against motor neurone disease and cancer. His promotions company, JR Darts helped with organisation of tournaments in the PDC from its infancy. Barry Hearn said without Raby, "we might not have had a PDC." He had been inducted into the PDC Hall of Fame in 2007.
- 27 – The League of Legends entertain the Hilton Hotel in Birmingham for week 3 of competition. Dave Whitcombe continued his winning ways, claiming a third straight win with 7–3 win over Eric Bristow. Bobby George won his first game of the league, beating Peter Evison 7–3. There were also wins for Bob Anderson and Keith Deller who respectively beat Cliff Lazarenko and John Lowe, who is the only one of the eight still without a win having lost his first three games.
- 29 – Phil Taylor wins his ninth PDC Pro Tour title of the year by winning the Players Championship in Las Vegas beating Ronnie Baxter in the final. Raymond van Barneveld suffered a shock first round exit to Germany's Michael Rosenauer, who went on the reach the semi-finals along with Mark Walsh. Mark Frost reached the quarter-finals and in doing so he secures his place in the World Matchplay.

=== July ===
- 4 – Raymond van Barneveld's defence of the Las Vegas Desert Classic ends as Alan Tabern defeats him 8–4 in the last 16.
- 6 – Phil Taylor wins the Las Vegas Desert Classic for the first time since 2005 beating James Wade 13–7 in the final.
- 9 – Andy Fordham is given medical advice that he requires a liver transplant having been diagnosed with cirrhosis.
- 12 – Scott Waites takes the BDO Gold Cup title with a 4–2 sets win over Gary Anderson at the Lakeside Country Club.
- 19 – Phil Taylor wins the Bobby Bourn Memorial Trophy for the sixth successive year in Blackpool. He beat Ronnie Baxter in the final of the Players Championship event which is a warm-up for the World Matchplay.
- 26 – Phil Taylor regains the World Matchplay title in Blackpool – his ninth title overall.

=== August ===
- 10 – Robert Thornton clinches his first PDC Pro Tour title in Shoalhaven, Australia
- 17 – Dennis Priestley claims his second PDC Pro Tour title of 2008 with a Players Championship victory over Lionel Sams in Kitchener, Canada
- 24 – Alan Tabern wins his second PDC Pro Tour title of the year at the Peachtree Open in Atlanta, Georgia.
- 30 – Phil Taylor extends his winning run to 31 matches by taking the first of the weekend's Players Championships in the Netherlands. He beats James Wade in the final.
- 31 – Phil Taylor completes the weekend title double in the Netherlands beating Terry Jenkins in the final. It is his sixth tournament win in a row and extends his winning run to 38 matches. His record in knockout matches in 2008 stands at 128 wins, 5 defeats with 17 titles in 18 finals.
- 31 – Mark Webster wins the WDF Europe Cup with 4–0 win over Northern Ireland's Daryl Gurney while the England pairing of Martin Adams and John Walton won the Pairs. They defeated Marko Kantele and Jarkko Komula 4–2. The men's team title went to Denmark for the first time.
- 31 – Krysztof Ratajski of Poland created a sensation by the Denmark Open Singles. He defeated Dutchman Fabian Roosenbrand in the final. The Women's title went to Julie Gore (Wales) who defeated Russia's Irina Armstrong 4–1.

=== September ===
- 4 – Norman Wright, husband of Cumbria Secretary and BDO stalwart Alma Wright dies.
- 6 – In a staggering upset Felix McBrearty, ranked 352 in the PDC, wins the PDC Pro Tour Players Championship at the Ireland Open Classic. He beat Kevin McDine, Colin Osborne, Michael van Gerwen, Andy Hamilton, Colin Lloyd and Chris Mason to clinch the title.
- 14 – Colin Lloyd claims his third PDC Pro Tour title of 2008 by winning the Windy City Open in Chicago. He beat Wayne Mardle in the final.
- 15 – Ellie Hindle, who worked closely with the BDO for many years at Pontin's, Brean Sands dies from cancer.
- 20 – In an all Scottish final, John Henderson beats Gary Anderson 4–2 in the final of the British Open in Bridlington. Despite the defeat Anderson won the inaugural BDO British Grand Prix and £12,000 top prize. Ross Montgomery was second and Davy Richardson third. In the Women's singles, Trina Gulliver beat Francis Hoenselaar 3–1 in the women's final.
- 27 – Mareno Michels (Netherlands) won the men's singles at the French Open beating Robert Hughest (Wales) 5–4 i the final. Irina Armstrong (Russia) won the Women's Singles defeating Karin Krappen of the Netherlands 4–0 in the final. Daniel van Mourik (Netherlands) won the Youth Singles.
- 29 – Shaun Greatbatch confirms his withdrawal from the World Masters and Zuiderduin Masters due to entering hospital at the beginning of November for continued treatment, but he remains optimistic about his chances of taking part at the Lakeside in January.

=== October ===
- 12 – Phil Taylor regains the World Grand Prix title in Dublin, beating Raymond van Barneveld in the final.
- 12 – Tony O'Shea and Anastasia Dobromyslova took the titles at the Welsh Masters. Bernie Smith (NZ) and Corrine Hammond (Aus) won the Singles titles in the 2008 New Zealand Masters.
- 12 – Gene Raymond, a former Surrey and England player dies. Raymond moved to Spain in later years.
- 17 – Lisa Ashton will replace Anastasia Dobromyslova at the Zuiderduin Masters. Anastasia is still plagued with visa problems and will not be permitted to play in the event by the Dutch authorities.
- 17 – Wes Newton secures a place in the Grand Slam of Darts winning the wildcard qualifier. Colin McGarry, Alan Tabern and Jamie Caven take second, third and fourth.
- 18 – Alex Roy wins the Scottish Players Championship
- 19 – James Wade win the second of the weekend's Players Championships
- 25 – Colin Osborne wins the Kirchheim Players Championship.
- 26 – Russell Stewart wins the Oceanic Masters.

=== November ===
- 1 – Michael van Gerwen wins the Gleneagle Irish Masters
- 2 – Phil Taylor wins the inaugural European Championship beating Adrian Lewis 11–5 in the final in Frankfurt, Germany.
- 2 – Terry Jenkins wins the John McEvoy Gold Darts Classic Pro Tour event in Killarney beating namesake Andy Jenkins in the final.
- 8 – Mervyn King wins the first of the weekend's Players Championships in Holland.
- 9 – James Wade wins the second Player's Championship in Holland
- 14 – The Pro-Celebrity curtain raiser to the Grand Slam of Darts is won by former Olympic javelin star Steve Backley who partnered James Wade to the title at the Wolverhampton Civic.
- 16 – Stephen Bunting wins the Northern Ireland Open beating Darryl Fitton in the final. Francis Hoenselaar beat Trina Gulliver to take the women's title.
- 23 – Scott Waites beat Scott Mitchell to win the Swedish Open. Carina Ekberg beat Kristin Bomander in an all-Swedish affair in the women's final
- 23 – Phil Taylor retains his Grand Slam Of Darts title.

=== December ===
- 1 – Tom Kirby passes away of pancreatic cancer aged 61.
- 17 – PDC Official Eddie Cox, brother of Tournament Director Tommy Cox, died suddenly – aged 51.
- 18 – A new TV deal is announced confirming that the PDC World Darts Championship will remain on Sky Television until 2013 which will be the 20th PDC World Championship.

== PDC ==
=== Ladbrokes World Darts Championship ===
	Score	
Quarter finals
John Part (Canada)	5–4	(England) James Wade
Kevin Painter (England)	5–2	(England) Adrian Lewis
Kirk Shepherd (England)	5–4	(England) Peter Manley
Wayne Mardle (England)	5–4	(England) Phil Taylor
Semi finals
John Part (Canada)	6–2	(England) Kevin Painter
Kirk Shepherd (England)	6–4	(England) Wayne Mardle
Final
John Part (Canada)	7–2	(England) Kirk Shepherd

=== PartyPoker.net US Open ===
Matches played in sets with three legs per set

	Score	
Quarter finals
Colin Lloyd (England)	3–0	(England) Ronnie Baxter
David Fatum (Canada)	3–1	(England) Chris Mason
Phil Taylor (England)	3–1	(United States) Ray Carver
Dennis Priestley (England)	3–0	(England) Mark Dudbridge
Semi finals
Colin Lloyd (England)	3–2	(Canada) David Fatum
Phil Taylor (England)	3–0	(England) Dennis Priestley
Final
Phil Taylor (England)	3–0	(England) Colin Lloyd

=== Premier League ===
	Score	
Semi finals
Phil Taylor 112.68 (England)	11–1	(England) Adrian Lewis 97.33
James Wade 89.62 (England)	11–8	(Netherlands) Raymond van Barneveld 90.65
Final
Phil Taylor (England) 108.36	16–8	(England) James Wade 100.14

=== Blue Square UK Open ===
	Score	
Quarter finals
Vincent van der Voort (Netherlands)	10–5	(England) Chris Thompson
Gary Mawson (United States)	10–6	(England) Wayne Jones
Raymond van Barneveld (Netherlands)	10–9	(England) Phil Taylor
James Wade (England)	10–6	(England) Alan Tabern
Semi finals
James Wade (England)	10–4	(Netherlands) Vincent van der Voort
Gary Mawson (United States)	10–8	(Netherlands) Raymond van Barneveld
Final
James Wade (England)	11–7	(United States) Gary Mawson

=== Las Vegas Desert Classic ===
	Score	
Quarter finals
Roland Scholten (Netherlands)	11–2	(England) Mervyn King
Phil Taylor (England)	11–4	(England) Adrian Gray
James Wade (England)	11–7	(England) Andy Hamilton
Peter Manley (England)	11–8	(England) Alan Tabern
Semi finals
Phil Taylor (England)	11–2	(Netherlands) Roland Scholten
James Wade (England)	11–8	(England) Peter Manley
Final
Phil Taylor (England)	13–7	(England) James Wade

=== World Matchplay ===
	Score	
Quarter finals
Dennis Priestley (England)	16–14	(England) Alan Tabern
James Wade (England)	16–12	(England) Matt Clark
Wayne Mardle (England)	18–16	(Netherlands) Raymond van Barneveld
Phil Taylor (England)	16–6	(England) Kevin McDine
Semi finals
James Wade (England)	17–5	(England) Wayne Mardle
Phil Taylor (England)	17–8	(England) Dennis Priestley
Final
Phil Taylor (England)	18–9	(England) James Wade

=== World Grand Prix ===
	Score	
Quarter finals
Phil Taylor (England)	4–1	(England) Andy Hamilton
John Part (Canada)	2–4	(England) Terry Jenkins
Raymond van Barneveld (Netherlands)	4–1	(England) Colin Lloyd
Mervyn King (England)	4–2	(England) Dennis Priestley
Semi finals
Phil Taylor (England)	5–0	(England) Terry Jenkins
Raymond van Barneveld (Netherlands)	5–0	(England) Mervyn King
Final
Phil Taylor (England)	6–2	(Netherlands) Raymond van Barneveld

=== European Championship ===
	Score	
Quarter finals
Phil Taylor (England)	9–5	(England) Mark Walsh
Ronnie Baxter (England)	5–9	(Scotland) Robert Thornton
Raymond van Barneveld (Netherlands)	2–9	(England) Adrian Lewis
Alan Tabern (England)	4–9	(England) Peter Manley
Semi finals
Phil Taylor (England)	11–7	(Scotland) Robert Thornton
Adrian Lewis (England)	11–7	(England) Peter Manley
Final
Phil Taylor (England)	11–5	(England) Adrian Lewis

=== PDC Pro Tour events ===
==== Players Championships ====
(All matches – Best of 5 sets, Best of 3 legs per set)

- Gibraltar, January 19: John Part 3-1 Chris Mason
- Gibraltar, January 20: James Wade 3–1 Denis Ovens
- South, March 1: Phil Taylor 3–0 James Wade
- North-West, March 15: Alan Tabern 3–0 Chris Mason
- Germany, March 22: Phil Taylor 3–1 Raymond van Barneveld
- Germany, March 23: Phil Taylor 3–1 Wayne Jones
- Midlands, March 29: Phil Taylor 3–0 Colin Lloyd
- Antwerp Darts Trophy, April 12: Phil Taylor 3–0 Andy Smith
- Scotland, April 19: Mervyn King 3–0 Mark Dudbridge
- Open Holland Masters, April 26: Raymond van Barneveld 3–0 Colin Osborne
- Thialf Darts Trophy, Heerenveen, June 1: cancelled
- Bristol, June 14: Phil Taylor 3–0 Alan Tabern
- Bristol, June 15: Dennis Priestley 3–2 Kevin Painter
- Las Vegas, June 29: Phil Taylor 3–1 Ronnie Baxter
- Bobby Bourn Memorial Trophy, Blackpool, July 19: Phil Taylor 3–0 Ronnie Baxter
- Australia Open, Shoalhaven, August 10: Robert Thornton 3–1 Paul Nicholson
- Kitchener Open, Canada, August 17: Dennis Priestley 3–1 Lionel Sams
- Peachtree Open, Atlanta, August 24: Alan Tabern 3–1 Andy Hamilton
- Veldhoven, Netherlands, August 30: Phil Taylor 3–1 James Wade
- Veldhoven, Netherlands, August 31: Phil Taylor 3–0 Terry Jenkins
- Ireland Open Classic, September 7: Felix McBrearty 3–1 Chris Mason
- Windy City Open, September 14: Colin Lloyd 3–2 Wayne Mardle
- Newport, Wales, September 20: Ronnie Baxter 3–0 Jamie Caven
- Newport, Wales, September 21: Alan Tabern 3–2 Colin Osborne
- Dublin, October 4: Phil Taylor 3–2 James Wade
- Dublin, October 5: Dennis Priestley 3–1 Raymond van Barneveld
- Scotland, October 18: Alex Roy 3–2 Denis Ovens
- Scotland, October 19: James Wade 3–1 Mark Walsh
- Dinslaken, Germany, October 25: Colin Osborne 3–2 Carlos Rodriguez
- Killarney Pro Tour, November 2: Terry Jenkins 3–0 Andy Jenkins
- Holland, November 8: Mervyn King 3–2 Raymond van Barneveld
- Holland, November 9: James Wade 3–2 Mark Walsh

==== UK Open Regional Finals ====
All finals best of 15 legs

- January 13 (North East): Colin Osborne 8–6 Denis Ovens
- February 10 (South-West): Colin Lloyd 8–6 Andy Hamilton
- March 2 (South): Colin Lloyd 8–6 Phil Taylor
- March 16 (North-West): Phil Taylor 8–7 Adrian Lewis
- March 30 (Midlands): Phil Taylor 8–0 Brendan Dolan

== BDO ==
=== Lakeside World Darts Championship ===
	Score	
Quarter finals
Mark Webster (Wales)	5–1	(England) Darryl Fitton
Martin Adams (England)	5–4	(Scotland) Robert Thornton
Brian Woods (England)	5–3	(England) Scott Waites
Simon Whitlock (Australia)	5–0	(England) Ted Hankey
Semi finals
Mark Webster (Wales)	6–4	(England) Martin Adams
Simon Whitlock (Australia)	6–3	(England) Brian Woods
Final
Mark Webster (Wales)	7–5	(Australia) Simon Whitlock

=== Winmau World Masters ===
	Score	
Quarter finals
Robert Wagner (Norway)	3–0	(Netherlands) Joey ten Berge
Scott Waites (England)	3–1	(England) Steve West
Tony O'Shea (England)	3–1	(Scotland) Ross Montgomery
Martin Adams (England)	3–0	(England) Steve Farmer
Semi finals
Scott Waites (England)	6–4	(Norway) Robert Wagner
Martin Adams (England)	6–2	(England) Tony O'Shea
Final
Martin Adams (England)	7–6	(England) Scott Waites

=== WDF Category 1 Events ===
WDF ranking points awarded: Winner 150, Runner-up 100, Semi-Finalists 80, Quarter-Finalists 48, 9th to 16th place 24, 17th to 32nd place 12.

- Dutch Open at NH Hotel/Congress centre, Veldhoven, February 7–10

Quarter-finals (Losers €500, Best of 9 legs) Robert Thornton (84.99) 4–1 Joey Ten Berge (88.14), Robert Wagner (100.20) 4–0 Patrick Bulen (78.63), Alain Van Bouwel (79.53) 4–1 Edwin Max (74.82), Willem Kralt (71.19) 4–3 Phill Nixon (75.84)
Semi-finals (Losers €1,250, Best of 5 sets, 5 legs per set) Robert Thornton (102.51) 2–0 Robert Wagner (97.59), Alain Van Bouwel (80.79) 2–0 Willem Kralt (76.80).
Final (Winner €4,500 Runner-up €2,250, Best of 7 sets, 5 legs per set) Robert Thornton (92.52) 3–0 Alain Van Bouwel (84.24)

- Scottish Open at Normandy Cosmopolitan Hotel, Renfrew, February 16–17

Quarter-finals (Losers £100, Best of 5 legs) Garry Thompson 3–1 Robert Thornton, Martin Adams 3–1 Willy Van De Wiel, Shaun Greatbatch 3–2 Daryl Gurney, Scott Waites 3–2 Steve O Donnell.
Semi-finals (Losers £300, Best of 7 legs) Garry Thompson 4–2 Martin Adams, Shaun Greatbatch 4–3 Scott Waites.
Final (Winner £2,000 Runner-up £800) Garry Thompson 5–1 Shaun Greatbatch

- German Open in Bochum, April 20

Quarter-finals (Losers €240) Mike Veitch 2–1 Mark Salmon, Gary Anderson 2–0 Robert Wagner, Robert Thornton 2–1 Brian Derbyshire, Mark Webster 2–1 Scott Waites.
Semi-finals (Losers €480) Gary Anderson 2–0 Mike Veitch, Robert Thornton 2–0 Mark Webster
Final (Winner €2,400 Runner-up €1,200) Gary Anderson 3–0 Robert Thornton

- Welsh Open at Pontins in Prestatyn, May 18. Matches played in sets, five legs per set.

Quarter-finals (Losers £150) Alan Norris 2–1 Ian Jones, Gary Anderson 2–1 Robert Thornton, Robert Hughes 2–0 Alan Walker, Mark Webster 2–0 Tony Clark.
Semi-finals (Losers £500) Gary Anderson 3–1 Alan Norris, Mark Webster 3–2 Robert Hughes
Final (Winner £2,000 Runner-up £1,000) Gary Anderson 4–0 Mark Webster

=== WDF Category 2 Events ===
- German Gold Cup, 27 January (Winner €840, Runner-up €420) Steve West (England) 3–2 (Germany) Andree Welge
- Las Vegas Open, 27 January (Winner $800, Runner-up $400) Darin Young (United States) beat (United States) Jerry Hilbourn
- Dortmund Open, 17 February (Winner €1,000, Runner-up €450) Ronny Huybrechts (Belgium) 3–1 (Netherlands) Jerry Hendricks
- Isle of Man Open, 9 March (Winner £5,000, Runner-up £1,000) Dave Chisnall (England) 3–1 (Wales) Robert Hughes
- England Open, 12 April (Winner £2,000, Runner-up £1,000) Ross Montgomery (Scotland) 3–2 (Scotland) Gary Anderson
- BDO International Open, 15 June (Winner £2,000, Runner-up £600) Davy Richardson (England) 4–1 (Scotland) Ross Montgomery
- Canadian Open, 15 June (Winner CAN$1,000, Runner-up CAN$500) Jerry Hull (Canada) beat (Canada) Danny MacInnis
- Australian Grand Masters, 6 July (Winner A$2,900, Runner-up A$1,400) Tony David (Australia) 5–3 Rob Modra (Australia)
- Pacific Masters, 26 July (Winner A$1,100, Runner-up A$600) Simon Whitlock (Australia) 6–2 (Australia) Anthony Fleet
- New Zealand Open, 6 August (Winner NZ$1,500, Runner-up NZ$700) Derrick Samson 5–2 Wayne Carey
- Belgian Open, 10 August (Winner €2,000, Runner-up €1,000) Scott Waites (England) 4–2 (Belgium) Johnny Petermans
- Malaysian Open, (Winner RM2,000, Runner-up RM1,000) 24 August Tengku Hadzali Shah (Malaysia) beat Lourence Ilagan (Philippines)
- WDF Europe Cup, 27–30 August, Mark Webster (Wales) 4–0 (Northern Ireland) Daryl Gurney
- British Open, 20 September, (Winner £3,000 Runner-up £1,000) John Henderson (Scotland) 4–2 (Scotland) Gary Anderson
- Northern Ireland Open, 9 November, (Winner £1,600 Runner-up £750) Stephen Bunting (England) 2–0 (England) Darryl Fitton

=== BDO International Grand Prix ===
New event consisting of five events televised by Setanta Sports in the United Kingdom. Tournament winners receive 15 Grand Prix points, runners-up 9, semi-finalists 6 and quarter-finalists 3.

- 18 May Welsh Open – winner Gary Anderson
- 15 June BDO International Open – winner Davy Richardson
- 12 July BDO Gold Cup – winner Scott Waites
- 26 July BDO British Classic – winner Ross Montgomery
- 21 September British Open – winner John Henderson

At the conclusion of the BDO International Grand Prix Series, the accumulated points won by players in each of the five tournaments from the highest to eighth position earned the following prizes:

1. (Scotland) Gary Anderson 42 points: £12000
2. (Scotland) Ross Montgomery 24 points: £6000
3. (England) Davy Richardson 18 points: £4000
4. (England) Scott Waites 15 points: £2750
4. (Scotland) John Henderson 15 points: £2750
6. (England) Gary Robson 12 points: £2000
7. (Wales) Mark Webster £1500

8th place (£1,000) was shared between the following players:

(England) Chris Jones
(England) Stuart Bousfield
(Netherlands) Mareno Michels
(Netherlands) Edwin Max
(England) Robbie Green
(Scotland) Mark Barilli
(Sweden) Alan Norris
(Wales) Robert Hughes

== Darts calendar ==
Date	Organisation	UK Broadcaster	Event	Winner/Notes
December 17, 2007 to January 1	PDC	Sky	Ladbrokes.com World Championship, Alexandra Palace, London	(Canada) John Part
January 5 to January 13	BDO	BBC	Lakeside World Championship, Lakeside Country Club, Frimley Green	(Wales) Mark Webster
January 31	PDC	Sky	Premier League opening week	concludes May 26 – see below
May 16 to May 18	PDC	Nuts TV	US Open, Connecticut	(England) Phil Taylor
May 16 to May 18	BDO / WDF	Setanta	Welsh Open, Prestatyn	(Scotland) Gary Anderson
May 26	PDC	Sky	Premier League Final, Cardiff International Arena	(England) Phil Taylor
May 30	unaffiliated	Setanta	BetFred League of Legends opening week	concludes August 22 – see below
June 5 to June 8	PDC	Sky	UK Open, Reebok Stadium, Bolton	(England) James Wade
June 15	BDO	Setanta	BDO International Open	(England) Davy Richardson
June 30 to July 6	PDC	Sky	Las Vegas Desert Classic, Mandalay Bay Hotel, Las Vegas	(England) Phil Taylor
July 12	BDO	Setanta	BDO Gold Cup, Lakeside Country Club, Frimley Green	(England) Scott Waites
July 20 to July 26	PDC	Sky	World Matchplay, Winter Gardens, Blackpool	(England) Phil Taylor
July 26	BDO	Setanta	BDO British Classic, Kettering	(Scotland) Ross Montgomery
August 22	unaffiliated	Setanta	BetFred League of Legends finals, Circus Tavern, Purfleet	(England) Bob Anderson
September 19 to September 21	BDO	Setanta	BDO British Open, Bridlington	(Scotland) John Henderson
October 6 to October 12	PDC	Sky	World Grand Prix, Dublin	(England) Phil Taylor
November 15 to November 23	BDO / PDC	ITV4	Grand Slam of Darts, Wolverhampton Civic	(England) Phil Taylor
December 4	BDO	none	2009 BDO World Championship qualifiers, Bridlington	
December 5 to December 7	BDO	BBC	Winmau World Masters, Bridlington	(England) Martin Adams

- The International Darts League (May 3–11) & World Darts Trophy (Sep 6–13) were both originally scheduled but both subsequently cancelled.
