= 2009 in darts =

This article documents all the events in the sport of darts over the course of 2009.

== News ==
=== January ===
- 2 – Raymond van Barneveld wins £20,000 for hitting the first PDC World Championship nine-darter, during his quarter-final against Jelle Klaasen.
- 3 – The 2009 BDO World Darts Championship gets underway at the Lakeside Country Club.
- 4 – Phil Taylor wins his fourteenth world title and twelfth in the PDC, after a 7–1 win over Raymond van Barneveld in the 2009 PDC World Championship final at London's Alexandra Palace. Taylor's average of 110.94 is a world record for a championship final.
- 9 – Francis Hoenselaar finally wins the Women's World Championship beating Trina Gulliver 2–1 in the final at the Lakeside. Also, Jelle Klaasen and Wayne Mardle are announced as the two wildcard selections for the Premier League Darts competition, that gets under way on February 5 in Liverpool.
- 10 – Terry Jenkins becomes the first player other than Phil Taylor to win the Bobby Bourn Memorial Players Championship, as the 2009 Pro Tour got underway at The Dome Leisure Centre in Doncaster. Jenkins beat Mark Dudbridge 6–3 in the final, as the Players Championship format reverts to the best of eleven legs.
- 11 – Ted Hankey wins the 2009 BDO World Championship final, winning an epic 7–6 encounter against Tony O'Shea. In the PDC, Colin Lloyd wins the first of the UK Open regional finals, beating Colin Osborne 6–1 in the final in Doncaster.
- 17 – Phil Taylor wins his second tournament of the month by capturing the Eddie Cox Memorial Players Championship in Gibraltar. He picked up the £6,000 first prize by coming from 2–1 down, winning the last five legs consecutively to beat Alan Tabern 6–2. Mark Walsh also picked up a £1,600 prize for a nine-darter against Jamie Caven, in a match he won 6–5.
- 18 – Phil Taylor completes the Gibraltar double, by beating Mark Dudbridge 6–1 in the final of the Stan James.com Players Championship. In the BDO, Richard Marcotte wins the category B Quebec Open beating Martin Tremblay to pick up the $2400 first prize.
- 24 – Garrett Gray of the Republic of Ireland wins the Gwynedd Open, defeating Derek Williams 5–3 in legs in the final. Also on the day, Jenni Tulley and Craig Baxter win the Scottish Mixed Pairs Championship in Bannockburn, beating Paul Hanvidge and Louise Hepburn 3–0 in the final.
- 25 – In the BDO, Kevin Münch wins the men's German Gold Cup defeating Jan Dekker 3 sets to 1 in the final. In the women's event, Irina Armstrong beats Karin Krappen 2–1 to retain the title. Elsewhere, Wes Newton claims the men's Las Vegas Open title defeating Brian Blake 4 legs to 0 in the final and in the women's event, Canada's Robin Curry wins 4–3 against American Cali West.
- 30 – The all-new Players Championship Finals tournament gets underway at the former home of the PDC World Darts Championship – the Circus Tavern in Purfleet, Essex.
- 31 – Scott Mitchell wins the Eastbourne Classic, beating Steve Douglas 3–0 in legs, in the final. In the women's event, Trina Gulliver beat Rhonda West 3–0 in legs.

=== February ===
- 1 – Phil Taylor wins his third consecutive tournament, with a 16–9 victory over first-time finalist Robert Thornton in the final of the Players Championship Finals. Taylor picked up £50,000 for victory.
- 5 – Mark Webster moves across from the BDO to the PDC, with his debut coming at the Players Championship double-header in Gladbeck at the end of February. Meanwhile, the fifth season of Premier League Darts gets underway at the Liverpool Echo Arena. The tournament will visit fourteen different venues over the course of the next fourteen weeks, before the final in late May at Wembley Arena. On the night, there were two draws (James Wade v John Part and Jelle Klaasen v Terry Jenkins) and wins for Phil Taylor and Mervyn King over Raymond van Barneveld (8–4) and Wayne Mardle (8–1) respectively.
- 8 – Darryl Fitton wins the Dutch Open, in Veldhoven beating Willy van de Wiel by 3–2 in sets. In the women's event, Trina Gulliver wins 5–3 in legs over Wales' Julie Gore. Meanwhile, in the pairs events, Holland's Gino Vos and Rico Dera beat Brian Woods and Robbie Green 2–1 in sets to win the men's and in the women's, Gulliver teamed up with her good friend Francis Hoenselaar to win 5–1 in legs over Gore and Welsh teammate Jan Robbins.
- 12 – Week two of the Premier League rolls into the Royal Highland Showground in Ingliston, Edinburgh. Just like week one, there were two draws (John Part v Raymond van Barneveld and Terry Jenkins v Wayne Mardle) and convincing wins for Phil Taylor, who won 8–2 against Jelle Klaasen and Mervyn King, who won 8–1 against James Wade. In other news, the number one ranked player in the World Darts Federation and two-time semi-finalist at the Grand Slam of Darts, Gary Anderson moves across from the BDO to the PDC, with his debut coming at the Players Championship and UK Open Scottish Regional events in Irvine in early March.
- 14 – Gino Vos wins the WDF-ranked Dortmund Open, beating Ronny Huybrechts three sets to one in the final. In the women's event, Michelle Sossong wins her first tournament, beating Carla Molema by two sets to nil.
- 16 – Roland Scholten has surgery on his injured shoulder which has seen his form dip and his ranking tumble outside the top 16.
- 19 – Mervyn King continued his impressive start to his maiden Premier League Darts campaign, with an 8–2 win over John Part as the Premier League circus moved to Coventry's Ricoh Arena for week three. He has now won his first three matches dropping just four legs in the process. In the other matches, Phil Taylor's 100% start was ended when he drew 7–7 with Terry Jenkins – having been as far back as 6–4. James Wade averaged nearly 108 in beating Raymond van Barneveld 8–4 in the second match on – a repeat of their semi-final meeting at the 2009 PDC World Darts Championship and Wayne Mardle won a hard-fought match with Jelle Klaasen 8–6, with Hawaii 5–0–1 picking up top checkout prize for the second week running.
- 21 – 2002 BDO World Champion Tony David was rushed to hospital for an emergency liver transplant. The operation was successful although he remains in an intensive care unit.
- 22 – Tony O'Shea wins the Scottish Open in Renfrew with a hard-fought 5–4 win over Martin Atkins. In the women's competition, Tricia Wright saw off Karen Lawman 4–0 in the final. The competition also ran pairs events, with Martin Phillips and Tony Martin, and Francis Hoenselaar and Irina Armstrong picking up the respective pairs trophies.
- 26 – James Wade inflicted the first defeat of the 2009 season on Phil Taylor with a fantastic 8–4 win over the fourteen-time world champion during week four's action at Belfast's Odyssey Arena in the Premier League. Wade's victory was made even sweeter by his 138 finish – the Deller checkout – to win the match. In the other matches, Mervyn King continued his 100% start with an 8–4 win over Jelle Klaasen, John Part thrashed Wayne Mardle 8–1 and Raymond van Barneveld won his first match of the tournament, seeing off Terry Jenkins 8–6 with an average of 106.51.
- 28 – Phil Taylor wins his third Players Championship event in succession, winning the German Darts Classic in Gladbeck. In the final, he saw off Adrian Lewis by 6 legs to nil. Over his seven matches on Saturday, just six legs were dropped by The Power, on his way to picking up the £6,000 first prize. In other matches, Mark Webster made his PDC debut but found life tough going, losing his very first match to Ronnie Baxter 6–1. Meanwhile, Stephen Bunting and Francis Lawson win the men's and women's Tyne and Wear Open. Bunting beat Glen Durrant to pick up the £1,100 first prize, while Lawson surprised Anastasia Dobromyslova to pick up the £200 first prize. In the youth competition, Leon Bailey saw off Lee Rump to claim victory.

=== March ===
- 1 – In a busy weekend of darts, it was four in a row for Phil Taylor as he sealed the Gladbeck Players Championship double. In a rematch of the previous day's final, Taylor beat Adrian Lewis by six legs to one, to pick up yet another £6,000 first prize. Elsewhere, the English team of Martin Atkins, Scott Waites, John Walton, Tony O'Shea and Martin Adams won the Nations Cup with a 13–8 victory over the Dutch side of Daniel Brouwer, Rick Hofstra, Kevin Vennik, Willy van de Wiel and Joey ten Berge. Waites' performance stood out as he won 5 of the English side's 13 legs. Meanwhile, Robert Wagner took advantage of the Nations Cup ruling out many top players, to win the Finnish Open beating Oskar Lukasiak 5–4 in a closely contested final. In the women's event, Tricia Wright won again, beating Kirsi Viinikainen 4–2 in the final. Wayne Brown also won the Essex Open, beating Jason Evans 4–1 in the final.
- 5 – Week five of the Premier League saw the competition move to the Metro Radio Arena in Newcastle for the highly anticipated clash between Mervyn King and Phil Taylor. A 7–7 draw was the result, however there was some needle between the two players. During the seventh leg, Taylor after removing the darts from a 60 score, dropped one of them at the side of the oche. As Taylor retrieved it, King threw his first dart over Taylor, thus being deemed unsporting by the 14-time world champion. In slightly less bad-tempered matches, James Wade moved up to second in the table after an 8–6 win over Jelle Klaasen, who still languishes at the bottom of the table; Wayne Mardle and Raymond van Barneveld shared a 7–7 draw and John Part occupies the final play-off spot, after an 8–5 win over the winless Terry Jenkins.
- 7 – Robert Thornton wins his first major PDC title by clinching the Scottish Players Championship in Irvine, North Ayrshire. In a repeat of the quarter-final of the Players Championship Finals, the man from Stevenston saw off Dennis Priestley in a deciding leg. Also in the tournament, making his debut was Gary Anderson. Under his new sobriquet of The Flying Scotsman, Anderson made the fourth round before falling to Thornton 6–3. In other darts-related news, Tony David was released from his hospital after his liver transplant on February 21. He is said to be feeling "great but tired".
- 8 – Robert Thornton became only the third player – after Phil Taylor and Adrian Lewis – to win both events of a PDC Pro Tour weekend after conquering Dennis Priestley again during the final of the UK Open Scottish Regional. With his win, Thornton has now won over £84,000 in less than a year's competition on the PDC circuit, and is within range of the world's top sixteen. In only his fourth tournament since defecting from the BDO, Mark Webster made his first Pro Tour semi-final, having survived a scare during his third round match. In a battle of the 2008 BDO World Darts Championship champions, Anastasia Dobromyslova wasted eight match darts at 5–4, before Webster came back and won 6–5. Webby would eventually fall to Thornton 6–3. Meanwhile, in a category four World Darts Federation event, Troy Hanlon won the Halifax Open in Canada. Hanlon beat Seymour Dixon in the final. In the women's event, Cindy Pardy beat Tammy Perry to pick up the trophy.
- 12 – Week six of the Premier League saw the tournament move to the Manchester Evening News Arena, and Mervyn King was defeated for the first time. Raymond van Barneveld put King to the sword, and defeated him by eight legs to three. In other matches, Jelle Klaasen earned only his second point after a 7–7 draw with John Part, and James Wade and Phil Taylor both recorded wins to hold onto second and third places in the table. Wade saw off Terry Jenkins 8–5, while Taylor beat Wayne Mardle 8–4.
- 14 – Dennis Priestley continues his current run of form by winning the North-West Players Championship at the Robin Park Tennis Centre in Wigan. He defeated Colin Lloyd 6–1 in the final to pick up the £6,000 prize. The star of the day's play however, was Louis Blundell, who surprised everyone by reaching the semi-finals to pick up £1,500. On the way, he beat former UK Open runner-up Gary Mawson, Peter Wright, Steve Maish and Mark Walsh before an incredible 6–0 whitewash of world number two James Wade. The Shevington native's luck was out though, as he would fall to Lloyd in a final leg decider.
- 15 – Fresh from his whitewash humbling by Louis Blundell the previous day, James Wade won his first tournament of 2009 after clinching the UK Open North-West Regional. Wade beat Kevin McDine 6–3 in the final, but again a lesser-known name made a mark. Durham's Paul Knighton reached his first PDC Pro Tour quarter-final beating Raymond van Barneveld 6–1 and Barrie Bates 6–3 along the way. He fell to McDine in another final-leg decider but earned £800 which pushed him up the PDC Order of Merit. In the BDO, Darryl Fitton won the prestigious Isle of Man Open, beating Ted Hankey to pick up the £5,000 first prize. In the women's event, Julie Gore saw off Lisa Ashton to win the tournament.
- 19 – Week seven saw the halfway stage being reached of the Premier League campaign when it took place at The Brighton Centre. Mervyn King suffered a second consecutive defeat, this time to Terry Jenkins 8–5 which saw him being dethroned as Premier League leader. Succeeding to the throne as table-topper was James Wade. Wade's fifth consecutive victory – 8–3 over Wayne Mardle – sees Wade top the table on eleven points. Phil Taylor moved up into second place after a similar win over John Part. Part fell out of the top four as Raymond van Barneveld won the all-Dutch clash with Jelle Klaasen, again by eight legs to three. In other news, Simon Whitlock became the third big name from the British Darts Organisation to move across to the Professional Darts Corporation. It marks a return to the PDC circuit for Whitlock as he competed in PDC events in 2003, reaching the second round of the 2003 PDC World Darts Championship before losing to Richie Burnett.
- 20 – Martin Goodin won the Torremolinos Open by beating Tim Jones 3–0 in the final. Jones was playing in his first tournament final, just two months after winning the John Smith's People's Darts Championship at the Lakeside. Namesake Linda Jones won the women's event, beating Carole Frison of France 3–0.
- 21 – Phil Taylor wins yet another Players Championship event, with a win in the Brentwood Players Championship. He defeated Ronnie Baxter in the final by six legs to two. Brad Wethington beat Lito Moises in the final to win the Virginia Beach Darts Classic, while Robin Curry beat Paula Murphy to win the women's event. In Gibraltar, John Ferrell beat Paul Harvey to win the Gibraltar Open. In the women's event, Carole Frison made her second final in two days, as she won the title, beating Paula Jacklin in the final.
- 22 – Yet another PDC Pro Tour weekend double for Phil Taylor as he wins the UK Open South-East Regional. He defeated Terry Jenkins in the final by six legs to four. The tournament also saw a return to form for Michael van Gerwen, who reached the semi-final before losing to Taylor.
- 26 – Week eight of the Premier League at the National Indoor Arena in Birmingham ended with a third different table-topper in three weeks. Phil Taylor returned to the top after an 8–2 win over Raymond van Barneveld. James Wade dropped to second behind The Power after he could only draw 7–7 with John Part, who moved back into the playoff spots due to van Barneveld's misfortune. In the other two matches, Mervyn King defeated Wayne Mardle – and his new throwing action – 8–2 and Jelle Klaasen earned his first win after edging out Terry Jenkins 8–6.
- 28 – Mark Walsh stuns Phil Taylor in the final of the Midlands Players Championship to win only his third PDC Pro Tour title. Walshie led both 2–0 and 5–2 before going on to win 6–4 in Coventry. Amazingly, that was only Taylor's second defeat of 2009, having only lost to James Wade on February 26, at night four of the Premier League in Belfast. Mervyn King also recorded his first competition nine-darter during his match with Stuart Bousfield, to which he received £4,000 after the bonus had rolled over for ten Pro Tour events. In other events, Jyhan Artut won the first day of the German Darts Corporation event in Niedernhausen. Artut beat Andree Welge 6–2 in the final. Meanwhile, Down Under, Brian Roach wins the first day of the Gaels Club Open in Penrith, New South Wales and took home the $800 first prize. He won a deciding leg against Barry Jouannet, after Jouannet took the game from 5–2 to the deciding leg.
- 29 – Phil Taylor bounced back from his shock defeat to Mark Walsh the day before by winning yet another UK Open Regional title, by winning the West Midlands qualifier in Coventry. In the final, he beat Wolverhampton's Wayne Jones 6–5, after Jones had missed darts to win his first PDC Pro Tour title. For the second consecutive day, a nine-darter was recorded. This time it was Raymond van Barneveld, who achieved this during his match against Kirk Shepherd. Meanwhile, on day two in Niedernhausen, Jyhan Artut completed the weekend double by beating Tomas Seyler 6–4 in the final. In Penrith, Barry Jouannet went one better than his result the previous day, by winning day two of the Gaels Club Open. He beat Jerry Weyman 7–4 in the final to win $800.

=== April ===
- 2 – Week nine of the Premier League sees the players go back across the border for the second of three nights to be held in Scotland, this time at Glasgow's Scottish Exhibition and Conference Centre. In front of a partisan crowd, Raymond van Barneveld returned to the top four after a crushing 8–1 win over John Part. In match two, Terry Jenkins beat Wayne Mardle 8–2. Match three saw Phil Taylor just edge past Jelle Klaasen 8–6, although Taylor was booed constantly throughout the match, and after the match, the Englishman said that he had been hit by an apple. Mervyn King, fresh from his nine-darter last weekend, won the final match 8–3 against James Wade.
- 4 – Phil Taylor wins yet another Players Championship, by winning the first of the weekend's events in Nuland. In the final, he beat Scotland's Gary Anderson – who was appearing in his first final since coming across to the PDC – by six legs to five. Anderson is known to be a formidable player when playing in the Netherlands, having won both the International Darts League and the World Darts Trophy. The players' averages were incredible, for an eleven-leg match. Anderson averaged 108.24, whereas Taylor recorded 116.04, in order to win the £6,000 first prize.
- 5 – An eleventh tournament win of 2009 for Phil Taylor as he beat Gary Anderson once again, 6–2 in the final of the second Players Championship in Nuland. There was a fourth nine-darter of the year, with Vincent van der Voort recording his first in open play against Mario Masurka. The English team won the BDO British Internationals championship, after an 8–4 win over Wales. In the women's event, Wales clinched their first title in a dozen years, winning 4–2 against England.
- 7 – After coming down with a virus, Wayne Mardle pulled out of week ten of the Premier League due to be played on April 9, in Exeter. John Part will play two matches, with Mardle due to make his games up on April 16 in Nottingham.
- 9 – John Part was the undoubted hero of week ten of the Premier League in Exeter, as he won one and drew the other of his two matches, to move into fourth place in the standings. In match one, he defeated Mervyn King 8–6, before drawing with Jelle Klaasen in the final match. In the other matches, Phil Taylor and Terry Jenkins drew 7–7 and James Wade beat Raymond van Barneveld 8–5.
- 11 – Michael van Gerwen won his first major UK tournament, by winning the South-West Players Championship in Taunton. The teenager beat his Dutch compatriot Vincent van der Voort 6–3 in the final, to pick up the winner's cheque. With the win, van Gerwen moved up to 30th in the PDC Order of Merit.
- 12 – Phil Taylor claimed yet another UK Open Regional title, by demolishing Andy Hamilton 6–0 in the final of the South-West Regional in Taunton. Over the six legs, Taylor's match average exceeded 120, finishing at 120.24, using just 75 darts. Elsewhere, Eser Tekin won the Turkish Masters, beating Emre Toros to pick up the €100 first prize. In the women's event, Neslihan Algul beat Mine Aloglu; and in Greece, John Michael and Evi Nakka won their respective Greek Open titles.
- 15 – Wayne Mardle is rushed into hospital, after contracting mumps. This ruled him out of the Week 11 matchups of the Premier League, in Nottingham. This left him with five matches to catch up over the last three weeks. This meant that Mervyn King and James Wade would play twice during week eleven, in a hastily rearranged fixture list.
- 16 – In the revised schedule of week eleven of the Premier League, James Wade was the only winner on the night; an 8–1 thrashing of Terry Jenkins. The other three matches (Jelle Klaasen v Mervyn King, King v Raymond van Barneveld and Phil Taylor v Wade) all ended up in 7–7 draws. This took Wade to the top of the standings with 17 points from 12 games, ahead of Taylor, who has 16 from 11 and King, who has 15 from 12.
- 18 – James Wade, fresh from returning to the top of the Premier League standings, won only his second title of 2009, by picking up the Players Championship event in Derby. He defeated Colin Lloyd 6–4 in the final, to pick up yet another £6,000 as he looks to keep within £300,000 of Phil Taylor in the PDC Order of Merit. Gary Anderson achieved his first nine-darter in the PDC, during his match with Darren Latham. He would latterly fall to his former BDO companion Mark Webster, but Anderson has now broken into the top 80 in the PDC, in just seven weeks. John Henderson won the German Open, after beating Stephen Bunting 3–2, while Trina Gulliver held off the in-form Tricia Wright 2–1, to win the women's event. The youth events were won by Zoe Jones and Tim van de Hoek, with the pairs events won by Ron Meulenkamp/Robert Wagner (men's) and Gulliver/Francis Hoenselaar (women's).
- 19 – Mark Walsh produced a sensational comeback to win the penultimate regional qualifier for the UK Open, by winning the East Midlands Regional in Derby. After being 4–0 down to Dutchman Raymond van Barneveld, Walshie reeled off 5 consecutive legs, before taking a deciding leg. It was his second tournament win of 2009. Ken Dobson caused a major surprise by reaching the semi-finals, before falling to Walsh 6–2. Elsewhere, Darin Young won the WDF-sanctioned Charlotte Open, beating Canada's Shawn Brenneman in the final. In another USA v Canada final, Paula Murphy beat Robin Curry to win the women's event.
- 20 – Wayne Mardle was given the all-clear to rejoin the Premier League circuit, for Thursday night's fixtures in Aberdeen. The PDC also revealed the fixtures for the last three weeks, after Mardle's illness had led to the original fixtures being scrapped.
- 22 – The Professional Darts Corporation released a statement confirming that Wayne Mardle had been removed from the 2009 Premier League, after he was re-admitted to hospital, with mumps. In order for four matches to be played at each remaining night, challenge matches were arranged, featuring Robert Thornton, Adrian Lewis, Dennis Priestley, Mark Webster and Gary Anderson. Also, the qualification places of James Wade and Phil Taylor to the play-offs were confirmed, as they could not be caught.
- 23 – Week twelve of the Premier League in Aberdeen began with one of the challenge matches arranged the day before. James Wade took on Robert Thornton in a race-to-7 match. Wade averaged in excess of 105 to beat the Scot 7–2. Regular Premier League matches completed the night, with Terry Jenkins and Mervyn King drawing 7–7, Raymond van Barneveld beating Jelle Klaasen 8–5, and Phil Taylor thrashed John Part 8–3. Taylor averaged 116.01 during the match, breaking his own record of 114.53, for the highest three-dart average recorded on television. King and van Barneveld confirmed their places in the play-offs, with Wade and Taylor confirmed to finish in the top two.
- 25 – Sixteen players qualified for the UK Open thanks to their performances during the Holsten Pub Qualifiers in Batley and Aylesbury. From the Batley event, Darren Weaver, Graham Usher, Chris Hornby, Stuart Monaghan, David Smurthwaite, Gary Stephens, Glen Durrant and Alan Davie all qualified, and from the Aylesbury event, Peter Green, Stuart Pickles, Coen Wiekamp, Adrian Genery, Steve Penney, Phil Currie, Steve Dolan and John McGuirk qualified. Elsewhere, John Henderson continued his good run, as he won the Scottish Singles Championship, beating Brian Woods 3–2 in the final. In the women's event, teenager Lorraine Hyde saw off Linda Marshall 3–1. Also, the pairs events were held towards the Open Holland, with Carla Molema winning the women's pairs and mixed pairs, with partners Irina Armstrong and Pedro Heijnen. Molema and Armstrong beat Melissa Landkroon and Melanie Os 4–0, while Molema and Heijnen beat Karin Krappen and Daniel Brouwer 5–0. The men's pairs were won by Hans Zeelenberg and Niels-Jan Stuiver, beating Alan Norris and Stephan Gerritsen 5–2.
- 26 – The sixteen remaining UK Open spots were snapped up during the Holsten Pub Qualifiers in Salford and Birmingham. Salford saw Kevin Beare, Duane Garfield, Matthew Campbell, Andy Boulton, Harry Robinson, Ken Mather, Les Fitton and Derek Williams all qualified, and in Birmingham, Andy Roberts, Mark Layton, Paul Cook, Paul Rowley, Mark Cox, Johnny Haines, Mike Langley and Andy Pearce all qualified. Meanwhile, the International Open Holland continued with the singles events. Mareno Michels saw off Scotland's Mark Barilli 3–2 to win the men's event. Karin Krappen avenged her mixed pairs defeat by beating Carla Molema 2–1 in the final of the women's event. The youth events were won by Jeffrey Sparidaans and Mercedes Pieters.
- 30 – The penultimate week of the Premier League saw play move to Sheffield, where two challenge matches and two league matches. In the challenge matches, Raymond van Barneveld saw off Adrian Lewis 7–5, and Phil Taylor saw off Dennis Priestley 7–4. Priestley also provided some humour to the crowd by donning a hula shirt, something made famous by Wayne Mardle whom Priestley had replaced due to his ill health. In the league, Terry Jenkins made sure that he didn't finish bottom after an 8–3 win over John Part, while James Wade completed his matches with an 8–4 win over Jelle Klaasen.

=== May ===
- 2 – Simon Whitlock returned in style to the DPA circuit, by winning the Saturday Goulburn Workers Club Open, in New South Wales. He saw off Steve MacArthur 7–5 in the final, having been 4–0 up at one stage.
- 3 – Another $1,000 went the way of Simon Whitlock as he completed the Australian Grand Prix double, by winning the Sunday Goulburn Workers Club Open. This time, he saw off Russell Stewart 7–2 in the final. Despite only competing in this weekend, Whitlock is up to fourth in the DPA Order of Merit, $800 behind leader Paul Nicholson.
- 7 – The regular season of the 2009 Premier League ended as the final week took place in Cardiff, and just like the previous week, was made up of two challenge matches and two league matches. In a battle of former BDO world champions, Jelle Klaasen saw off Mark Webster 7–3, while John Part was humbled 7–4 by Gary Anderson; the Scot averaged 107.40 during the match. In the league matches, Raymond van Barneveld clinched third after a 7–7 draw with Terry Jenkins, who finished fifth, and Phil Taylor sealed the number one spot after an 8–2 win over Mervyn King. The semi-finals at Wembley Arena on May 25, will see Taylor and King face each other once again, while van Barneveld will do battle with James Wade.
- 9 – The PDC Pro Tour returned after a three-week break with the Welsh Players Championship in Newport. After his superb win over John Part the previous Thursday, Gary Anderson clinched his first tournament win after beating Mervyn King 6–2 in the final. Anderson moved into the world's top sixty after the win, while King moved into the world's top five.
- 10 – In a weekend of firsts, Jamie Caven won his first Pro Tour title, by winning the UK Open Welsh Regional in Newport. He edged out Alan Tabern in a final leg decider to pick up the £6,000 first prize. What makes Caven's success even more special is the fact that he is blind in one eye. The Welsh Regional was the final qualifying event for the UK Open and will see 130 players take part at the tournament. Elsewhere, Simon Whitlock's great run continued, as he won his third successive tournament on the DPA circuit. Whitlock saw off Phil Hazell 7–5 in the final of the Clubs NZ Viva Las Vegas event, despite trailing 4–1. Both players receive airfare and accommodation for the PartyPoker.net Las Vegas Desert Classic in July.
- 25 – James Wade won the 2009 Premier League Darts after an amazing night unfolded at Wembley Arena. Mervyn King knocked out four-time defending champion Phil Taylor 10–6 in the first semi-final. In the second semi, Wade put paid to the chances of Raymond van Barneveld 10–8. In the final, Wade raced into a 7–0 lead over King, but eventually won 13–8.
- 31 – Scott Burnett won the North American Darts Championship in Boxborough, Massachusetts after a 6–3 win over Darin Young. With the win, Burnett earned a place at the 2009 Las Vegas Desert Classic at the start of July.

=== June ===
- 7 – Phil Taylor won the 2009 UK Open after a hard-fought 11–6 win over Colin Osborne in the final. Osborne's final performance also earns him a place at the 2009 Grand Slam of Darts.
- 13 – Mark Walsh claimed his third tournament of the year with a 6–4 win over Jamie Caven in the Barnsley Players Championship. Caven's £3,000 earned also helps towards earning a place at the 2009 World Matchplay.
- 14 – A week after reaching the UK Open final, Colin Osborne wrapped up his first tournament title of 2009 with a 6–2 win over Gary Anderson in Barnsley. Anderson's runner-up earnings pushed him towards the edge of the top 50 in the PDC Order of Merit. Colin Monk earned £2,000 for a nine dart finish in a 6–1 win over Ray Farrell.
- 20 – "Pieman" Andy Smith claimed his first tournament win since October 2007 after winning the German Darts Trophy in Dinslaken. Smith edged out Colin Lloyd in a deciding leg to win the £6,000 first prize. Along the way, Smith also hit a nine dart finish during a 6–5 victory over Mark Walsh. Joe Cullen made his first semi-final since turning professional, losing 6–3 to Smith in the semi-finals.
- 21 – Mark Walsh picked up his fourth title of 2009 with a win in Dinslaken over Andy Hamilton 6–5. Walsh, the highest ranked player on the Players Championship Order of Merit in the tournament also knocked out Ronnie Baxter, Gary Anderson and Steve Beaton en route to the final. Meanwhile, on the DPA circuit, Simon Whitlock continued his good form by winning the Mittagong RSL Club Open in Mittagong, New South Wales. He beat Kevin Luland 8–2 in the final to claim his eighth title of the year.
- 28 – The first six of twelve remaining places in the 2009 Las Vegas Desert Classic were sealed in the first of two qualifying tournaments at the Mandalay Bay Resort in Las Vegas, Nevada. Sealing places in the tournament were Dutch trio Jelle Klaasen, Co Stompé and Vincent van der Voort, Australian Simon Whitlock and English pair Jamie Caven and Peter Wright.
- 29 – The final six places for the 2009 Las Vegas Desert Classic were taken during the second qualifying event at the Mandalay Bay Resort in Las Vegas, Nevada. Former champion Peter Manley, who has dropped out of the world's top 16 due to poor form, Colin Monk, Wes Newton, Louis Blundell, Phillip Hazel and Gary Anderson all qualified for the £200,000 event.
- 30 – Ronnie Baxter handed Phil Taylor only his second Players Championship loss of the season, with a stunning 6–2 win over the world number one in the Las Vegas Players Championship at the Mandalay Bay Resort. Baxter's win also takes him within a few pounds of the top six qualification places for the 2010 Premier League. Wes Newton and Larry Butler both hit nine dart finishes against Colin Osborne and Jan van der Rassel respectively, sharing an £800 bonus prize. Their nine-darters didn't help them progress in the tournaments, as they lost against their respective opponents 6–3 and 6–2.

=== July ===
- 5 – Phil Taylor picked up yet another Las Vegas Desert Classic win, with a 13–11 victory over Raymond van Barneveld. Taylor had breezed into the final with an easy 11–1 win over John Part in the semi-finals, whereas van Barneveld had a tougher match, defeating James Wade 11–6.

== PDC ==
=== Ladbrokes.com World Darts Championship ===
| | Score | |
|---|---|---|
Quarter-Finals (best of 9 sets, 5 legs)
| Phil Taylor (England) | 5–0 | (Netherlands) Co Stompé |
| Mervyn King (England) | 5–2 | (Wales) Barrie Bates |
| Raymond van Barneveld (Netherlands) | 5–1 | (Netherlands) Jelle Klaasen |
| Paul Nicholson (Australia) | 3–5 | (England) James Wade |
Semi-Finals (best of 11 sets, 5 legs)
| Phil Taylor (England) | 6–2 | (England) Mervyn King |
| Raymond van Barneveld (Netherlands) | 6–4 | (England) James Wade |
Final (best of 13 sets, 5 legs)
| Phil Taylor (England) | 7–1 | (Netherlands) Raymond van Barneveld |

=== Premier League ===
| | Score | |
|---|---|---|
Semi finals
| Phil Taylor 95.78 (England) | 6–10 | (England) Mervyn King 89.86 |
| James Wade 97.93 (England) | 10–8 | (Netherlands) Raymond van Barneveld 95.26 |
Final
| Mervyn King (England) 85.83 | 8–13 | (England) James Wade 90.38 |

=== Coral.co.uk Players Championship ===
| | Score | |
|---|---|---|
Quarter-Finals (best of 17 legs)
| Phil Taylor (England) | 9–0 | (England) Colin Lloyd |
| Ronnie Baxter (England) | 9–5 | (England) Mervyn King |
| James Wade (England) | 9–8 | (Netherlands) Raymond van Barneveld |
| Dennis Priestley (England) | 5–9 | (Scotland) Robert Thornton |
Semi-Finals (best of 25 legs)
| Phil Taylor (England) | 13–2 | (England) Ronnie Baxter |
| James Wade (England) | 10–13 | (Scotland) Robert Thornton |
Final (best of 31 legs)
| Phil Taylor (England) | 16–9 | (Scotland) Robert Thornton |

=== Blue Square UK Open ===
| | Score | |
|---|---|---|
Quarter-Finals (best of 19 legs)
| Colin Osborne (England) | 10–3 | (England) Jamie Caven |
| Kevin Painter (England) | 10–8 | (England) Alan Tabern |
| Ronnie Baxter (England) | 10–7 | (England) Terry Jenkins |
| Mark Lawrence (England) | 0–10 | (England) Phil Taylor |
Semi-Finals (best of 19 legs)
| Colin Osborne (England) | 10–7 | (England) Kevin Painter |
| Ronnie Baxter (England) | 6–10 | (England) Phil Taylor |
Final (best of 21 legs)
| Colin Osborne (England) | 6–11 | (England) Phil Taylor |

=== PartyPoker.net Las Vegas Desert Classic ===
| | Score | |
|---|---|---|
Quarter-Finals (best of 19 legs)
| Phil Taylor (England) | 10–6 | (Scotland) Gary Anderson |
| John Part (Canada) | 10–8 | (England) Terry Jenkins |
| James Wade (England) | 10–6 | (England) Adrian Lewis |
| Raymond van Barneveld (Netherlands) | 10–1 | (England) Mervyn King |
Semi-Finals (best of 21 legs)
| Phil Taylor (England) | 11–1 | (Canada) John Part |
| James Wade (England) | 6–11 | (Netherlands) Raymond van Barneveld |
Final (best of 25 legs)
| Phil Taylor (England) | 13–11 | (Netherlands) Raymond van Barneveld |

=== Stan James World Matchplay ===
| | Score | |
|---|---|---|
Quarter-Finals (best of 31 legs)
| Phil Taylor (England) | 16–3 | (England) Adrian Lewis |
| Mervyn King (England) | 16–6 | (Netherlands) Vincent van der Voort |
| James Wade (England) | 10–16 | (England) Ronnie Baxter |
| Terry Jenkins (England) | 16–12 | (Netherlands) Raymond van Barneveld |
Semi-Finals (best of 33 legs)
| Phil Taylor (England) | 17–6 | (England) Mervyn King |
| Ronnie Baxter (England) | 12–17 | (England) Terry Jenkins |
Final (best of 35 legs)
| Phil Taylor (England) | 18–4 | (England) Terry Jenkins |

=== Skybet World Grand Prix ===
| | Score | |
|---|---|---|
Quarter-Finals (best of 7 sets, 5 legs)
| Phil Taylor (England) | 4–0 | (England) Adrian Lewis |
| Terry Jenkins (England) | 4–0 | (England) Andy Smith |
| Kevin Painter (England) | 1–4 | (England) Andy Hamilton |
| Jacko Barry (Republic of Ireland) | 0–4 | (Netherlands) Raymond van Barneveld |
Semi-Finals (best of 9 sets, 5 legs)
| Phil Taylor (England) | 5–2 | (England) Terry Jenkins |
| Andy Hamilton (England) | 2–5 | (Netherlands) Raymond van Barneveld |
Final (best of 11 sets, 5 legs)
| Phil Taylor (England) | 6–3 | (Netherlands) Raymond van Barneveld |

=== European Championship ===
| | Score | |
|---|---|---|
Quarter-Finals (best of 19 legs)
| Phil Taylor (England) | 10–3 | (Scotland) Gary Anderson |
| Jelle Klaasen (Netherlands) | 10–5 | (England) Colin Lloyd |
| Mark Walsh (England) | 6–10 | (England) Steve Beaton |
| Mervyn King (England) | 6–10 | (England) James Wade |
Semi-Finals (best of 21 legs)
| Phil Taylor (England) | 11–3 | (Netherlands) Jelle Klaasen |
| Steve Beaton (England) | 11–10 | (England) James Wade |
Final (best of 21 legs)
| Phil Taylor (England) | 11–3 | (England) Steve Beaton |

=== PDC Pro Tour ===
(All matches — best of 11 legs)

==== Players Championships ====
- Bobby Bourn Memorial Trophy, January 10: Terry Jenkins 6–3 Mark Dudbridge
- Gibraltar, January 17: Phil Taylor 6–2 Alan Tabern
- Gibraltar, January 18: Phil Taylor 6–1 Mark Dudbridge
- Germany, February 28: Phil Taylor 6–0 Adrian Lewis
- Germany, March 1: Phil Taylor 6–1 Adrian Lewis
- Scotland, March 7: Robert Thornton 6–5 Dennis Priestley
- North-West, March 14: Dennis Priestley 6–1 Colin Lloyd
- South, March 21: Phil Taylor 6–2 Ronnie Baxter
- Midlands, March 28: Mark Walsh 6–4 Phil Taylor
- Nuland, April 4: Phil Taylor 6–5 Gary Anderson
- Nuland, April 5: Phil Taylor 6–2 Gary Anderson
- South-West, April 11: Michael van Gerwen 6–3 Vincent van der Voort
- East-Midlands, April 18: James Wade 6–4 Colin Lloyd
- Wales, May 9: Gary Anderson 6–2 Mervyn King
- Barnsley, June 13: Mark Walsh 6–4 Jamie Caven
- Barnsley, June 14: Colin Osborne 6–2 Gary Anderson
- Dinslaken, June 20: Andy Smith 6–5 Colin Lloyd
- Dinslaken, June 21: Mark Walsh 6–5 Andy Hamilton
- Las Vegas, June 30: Ronnie Baxter 6–2 Phil Taylor
- Australia, August 8: Paul Nicholson 6–1 Robert Thornton
- Canada, August 16: Dennis Priestley 6–4 Wes Newton
- Austria, September 5: Adrian Lewis 6–4 Carlos Rodriguez
- Austria, September 6: Jamie Caven 6–2 Steve Beaton
- Ireland, October 3: Adrian Lewis 6–4 Andy Hamilton
- Ireland, October 4: Phil Taylor 6–1 Wes Newton
- Killarney Pro Tour, October 18: Phil Taylor 6–0 Paul Nicholson
- Nuland, October 24: Steve Beaton 6–1 Wes Newton
- Nuland, October 25: James Wade 6–2 Brendan Dolan
- Scotland, November 7: Wes Newton 6–5 Steve Beaton
- Scotland, November 8: Colin Osborne 6–4 Michael van Gerwen

==== UK Open Regional Finals ====
- January 11 (North East): Colin Lloyd 6–1 Colin Osborne
- March 8 (Scotland): Robert Thornton 6–2 Dennis Priestley
- March 15 (North West): James Wade 6–3 Kevin McDine
- March 22 (South): Phil Taylor 6–4 Terry Jenkins
- March 29 (Midlands): Phil Taylor 6–5 Wayne Jones
- April 12 (South-West): Phil Taylor 6–0 Andy Hamilton
- April 19 (East-Midlands): Mark Walsh 6–5 Raymond van Barneveld
- May 10 (Wales): Jamie Caven 6–5 Alan Tabern

== BDO/WDF ==
=== Lakeside World Darts Championship ===
| | Score | |
|---|---|---|
Quarter-Finals (best of 9 sets, 5 legs)
| Gary Anderson (Scotland) | 3–5 | (England) Tony O'Shea |
| Darryl Fitton (England) | 5–4 | (England) Scott Waites |
| John Walton (England) | 1–5 | (England) Ted Hankey |
| Gary Robson (England) | 4–5 | (England) Martin Adams |
Semi-Finals (best of 11 sets, 5 legs)
| Tony O'Shea (England) | 6–4 | (England) Darryl Fitton |
| Ted Hankey (England) | 6–4 | (England) Martin Adams |
Final (best of 13 sets, 5 legs)
| Tony O'Shea (England) | 6–7 | (England) Ted Hankey |

=== Winmau World Masters ===
| | Score | |
|---|---|---|
Quarter-Finals (best of 5 sets, 3 legs)
| Tony O'Shea (England) | 3–0 | (Netherlands) Joey ten Berge |
| Martin Adams (England) | 3–1 | (Netherlands) Gino Vos |
| Lourence Ilagan (Philippines) | 3–2 | (England) Steve West |
| Robbie Green (England) | 3–0 | (Republic of Ireland) Connie Finnan |
Semi-Finals (best of 11 sets, 3 legs)
| Tony O'Shea (England) | 2–6 | (England) Martin Adams |
| Lourence Ilagan (Philippines) | 3–6 | (England) Robbie Green |
Final (best of 13 sets, 3 legs)
| Martin Adams (England) | 7–6 | (England) Robbie Green |

=== WDF World Cup ===
| | Score | |
|---|---|---|
Quarter-Finals (best of 9 legs)
| Connie Finnan (Republic of Ireland) | 5–3 | (Australia) Anthony Fleet |
| David Smith-Hayes (Wales) | 2–5 | (Netherlands) Joey ten Berge |
| Eser Tekin (Turkey) | 4–5 | (England) Scott Waites |
| Martin McCloskey (Republic of Ireland) | 1–5 | (England) Tony O'Shea |
Semi-Finals (best of 11 legs)
| Connie Finnan (Republic of Ireland) | 4–6 | (Netherlands) Joey ten Berge |
| Scott Waites (England) | 3–6 | (England) Tony O'Shea |
Final (best of 13 legs)
| Joey ten Berge (Netherlands) | 3–7 | (England) Tony O'Shea |

=== Zuiderduin Masters ===
| | Score | |
|---|---|---|
Quarter-Finals (best of 5 sets, 5 legs)
| Martin Atkins (England) | 1–3 | (England) Alan Norris |
| Ross Montgomery (Scotland) | 1–3 | (England) Darryl Fitton |
| Martin Adams (England) | 3–1 | (England) Steve West |
| Gary Robson (England) | 3–2 | (England) Scott Waites |
Semi-Finals (best of 5 sets, 5 legs)
| Alan Norris (England) | 0–3 | (England) Darryl Fitton |
| Martin Adams (England) | 3–1 | (England) Gary Robson |
Final (best of 7 sets, 5 legs)
| Darryl Fitton (England) | 4–2 | (England) Martin Adams |

=== WDF Category 1 Events ===
- Dutch Open at NH Hotel/Congress centre, Veldhoven, February 8

Quarter-Finals (Losers €500, Best of 7 legs) Tony O'Shea 4–1 John Walton, Darryl Fitton 4–3 Magnus Caris, Brian Woods 4–3 Paul Hogan, Willy van de Wiel 4–2 Dennis te Kloese
Semi-Finals (Losers €1,250, Best of 3 sets, 5 legs per set) Darryl Fitton 2–1 Tony O'Shea, Willy van de Wiel 2–0 Brian Woods
Final (Winner €4,500 Runner-up €2,250, Best of 5 sets, 5 legs per set) Darryl Fitton 3–2 Willy van de Wiel

- Scottish Open at Normandy Cosmopolitan Hotel, Renfrew, February 22

Quarter-Finals (Losers £100, Best of 5 legs) Tony O'Shea 3–2 Ian White, Martin Phillips 3–1 Garrett Gray, Martin Atkins 3–1 Martin Adams, Andy Roberts 3–1 Alan Norris
Semi-Finals (Losers £300, Best of 7 legs) Tony O'Shea 4–2 Martin Phillips, Martin Atkins 4–2 Andy Roberts
Final (Winner £2,000 Runner-up £800, Best of 9 legs) Tony O Shea 5–4 Martin Atkins

- German Open in Bochum, April 18. Matches played in sets, three legs per set.

Quarter-Finals (Losers €240) John Henderson 2–0 Martin Adams, Robbie Green 2–0 Garry Thompson, Robert Wagner 2–1 Steve West, Stephen Bunting 2–0 Ian White
Semi-Finals (Losers €480) John Henderson 2–1 Robbie Green, Stephen Bunting 2–0 Robert Wagner
Final (Winner €2,400 Runner-up €1,200) John Henderson 3–2 Stephen Bunting

- Welsh Open at Pontins in Prestatyn, May 17. Matches played in sets, five legs per set.

Quarter-Finals (Losers £250) Ross Montgomery 3–1 Martin Atkins, Dougie Smith 3–0 Wayne Brown, Stuart Kellet 3–1 Brian Derbyshire, Mark Barilli 3–0 Steve West
Semi-Finals (Losers £600) Ross Montgomery 2–1 Dougie Smith, Mark Barilli 2–1 Stuart Kellet
Final (Winner £2,500 Runner-up £1,200) Ross Montgomery 3–0 Mark Barilli

British Open at The Spa in Bridlington, September 19.

Quarter-Finals (Losers £150, Best of 5 legs) Colin Fowler 3–2 Martin Adams, Dave Chisnall 3–1 Alan Norris, Paul Hanvidge 3–2 Daryl Gurney, Martin Atkins 3–1 John Henderson
Semi-Finals (Losers £400, Best of 3 sets, 5 legs per set) Dave Chisnall 2–1 Colin Fowler, Martin Atkins 2–1 Paul Hanvidge
Final (Winner ££3,000 Runner-up £1,000, Best of 3 sets, 5 legs per set) Dave Chisnall 2–0 Martin Atkins

=== WDF Category 2 Events ===
- German Gold Cup, January 25 (Winner €840, Runner-up €420) Kevin Munch (Germany) 3–1 (Netherlands) Jan Dekker
- England Classic, February 1 Scott Mitchell 3–0 Steve Douglas
- Dortmund Open, February 15 Gino Vos (Netherlands) 3–1 (Belgium) Ronny Huybrechts
- Isle of Man Open, March 15 (Winner £5,000) Darryl Fitton (England) beat (England) Ted Hankey
- Virginia Beach Dart Classic, March 21 (Winner $1,200, Runner-up $600) Brad Wethington (United States) beat (Philippines) Lito Moises
- Open Holland, April 26 (Winner €2,500, Runner-up €1,000) Mareno Michels (Netherlands) 3–2 (Scotland) Mark Barilli
- Antwerp Open, May 24 (Winner €2,500, Runner-up €1,000) Ian White (England) 3–0 (England) Ted Hankey
- BDO International Open, June 14 (Winner £2,000, Runner-up £600) Tony O'Shea (England) 4–0 (England) Ted Hankey
- Canadian Open, June 26 (Winner C$1000, Runner-up C$500) Jerry Hull (Canada) beat (Canada) Rodney Spencer
- England Open, June 28 (Winner £2,000 Runner-up £1,000) Ted Hankey 5–0 Tony O'Shea
- Malaysian Open, July 4 (Winner RM2,000 Runner-up RM1,000) Clarines Joseph (Malaysia) beat (Malaysia) Mohd Latif Sapup
- Australian Grand Masters, July 5 (Winner A$2,900 Runner-up $1,400) Anthony Fleet (Australia) 5–3 (Australia) Shane Tichowitsch
- England Masters, July 19 (Winner £1,200 Runner-up £600) Brian Woods 5–0 Dave Chisnall
- British Classic, July 25 (Winner £2,000 Runner-up £500) Stephen Bunting (England) 2–1 (England) Scott Waites
- Pacific Masters, July 25 (Winner A$1,100 Runner-up A$600) Anthony Fleet (Australia) 6–2 (Australia) Neil Hembrow
- New Zealand Open, August 5 Koha Kokiri 5–0 Eddie Toms
- Belgium Open, August 9 (Winner €2,500 Runner-up €1,200) John Henderson (Scotland) 2–0 (England) John Walton
- Didam Open, August 23 (Winner €2,500 Runner-up €1,000) John Henderson (Scotland) 3–0 (England) Tony West
- Tops of Holland, October 25 (Winner €2,500 Runner-up €1,000) Brian Woods (England) 3–2 (England) Steve West
- Northern Ireland Open, November 8 (Winner £1,600 Runner-up £750) Martin Atkins (England) 2–0 (Netherlands) Willy van de Wiel
- Flanders Open, November 15 (Winner €2,500 Runner-up €1,000) John Walton (England) 3–1 (England) Steve West
- Center Parcs Masters, November 29 (Winner €2,500 Runner-up €1,000) Martin Adams (England) 3–1 (Netherlands) Frans Harmsen

== See also ==
- 2009 in sports
- 2008 in darts
- 2010 in darts
