= BDO International Grand Prix Series =

Tournament information
- Established: 2008
- Organisation(s): British Darts Organisation (BDO)
- Prize fund: £32,000 (2008) £28,000 (2009)
- Final Year: 2009

Final champion(s)
- (England) Dave Chisnall

The BDO International Grand Prix Series was a series of tournaments in the sport of darts. Organised by the British Darts Organisation (BDO), the series was made up of five already established 'stand-alone' darts tournaments that were played under a generic ‘umbrella’ format. The five darts tournaments were; the BDO British Classic, the BDO British Open, the BDO Gold Cup, the BDO International Open and the BDO Welsh Open. The BDO awarded points in the men's singles at each event from the quarter-final to final stages. After all five tournaments were completed, the person who accumulated the most points over the five tournaments would be declared the overall winner and winner of the BDO International Grand Prix Series.

== History ==
The BDO International Grand Prix Series was established in 2008. The five darts tournaments that made up the Series were; the BDO British Open, the BDO British Classic, the BDO Gold Cup, the BDO International Open and the BDO Welsh Open. Each tournament was a ‘stand-alone’ event, but was played under a generic ‘umbrella’ International Grand Prix title. The BDO awarded points at the each event in the men's singles events from the quarter-final to final stages. After the five tournaments were completed, the person who accumulated the most points over the five tournaments would be declared the overall winner and the winner of BDO International Grand Prix Series winner. The five tournaments were broadcast live on Setanta Sports, which marked a debut for the sport of darts on the channel. In each tournament, the final stages of the men’s singles from the quarter-finals to the final stages were broadcast live on Setanta Sports. For sponsorship purposes, it was known as the BDO Fire Kills International Grand Prix Series.

== Event information ==
=== Tournament dates ===
Tournaments dates in 2008 and 2009 and were played in the following order;

Tournaments	2008	2009
BDO Welsh Open	18 / 05	17 / 05
BDO International Open	15 / 06	14 / 06
BDO Gold Cup	12 / 07	11 / 07
BDO British Classic	26 / 07	25 / 07
BDO British Open	20 / 09	19 / 09

=== Points scoring ===
The points scoring system was the same in 2008 and 2009.

Round	Pos	Points
Final	1st (Winner)	15
Final	2nd (Runner-up)	9
Semi-final	Joint-3rd x 4 players	6
Quarter-final	Joint 5th x 4 players	3

=== Prize money ===
The prize money was £32,000 in 2008, but dropped to £28,000 in 2009.

Pos	2008	2009
1	£12,000	
2	£6,000	
3	£4,000	
4	£3,000	
5	£2,500	£2,000
6	£2,000	£1,000
7	£1,500	None; Awarded
8	£1,000	None; Awarded
Total	£32,000	£28,000

== Results ==
=== 2008 ===
Tournament	Winner	Runner-up	Semi finalists	Quarter finalists	Ref
BDO Welsh Open	(Scotland) Gary Anderson	(Wales) Mark Webster	(Sweden) Alan Norris (Wales) Robert Hughes	(England) Ian Jones (Scotland) Robert Thornton (Wales) Alan Walker (Wales) Tony Clark	
BDO International Open	(England) Davy Richardson	(Scotland) Ross Montgomery	(England) Robbie Green (Scotland) Mark Barilli	(England) Ted Hankey (England) Joe Murnan (England) Mick Cookman (England) Gary Robson	
BDO Gold Cup	(England) Scott Waites	(Scotland) Gary Anderson	(England) Chris Jones (England) Stuart Bousfield	(England) Mick Reed (England) Paul Cook (England) Gavin Forsythe (England) Kevin Edwards	
BDO British Classic	(Scotland) Ross Montgomery	(Scotland) Gary Anderson	(England) Gary Robson (Netherlands) Edwin Max	(England) Tony O'Shea (England) Stephen Bunting (England) Davy Richardson (England) Stuart Kellett	
BDO British Open	(Scotland) John Henderson	(Scotland) Gary Anderson	(Netherlands) Mareno Michels (England) Martin Atkins	(England) Gary Robson (England) Martin Adams (England) John Walton (England) Phil Nixon	

2008 BDO International Grand Prix Series Final Standings

Pos	Player	Points	Money
1	(Scotland) Gary Anderson (c)	42	£12,000
2	(Scotland) Ross Montgomery	24	£6,000
3	(England) Davy Richardson	18	£4,000
4	(Scotland) John Henderson	15	£2,750
4	(England) Scott Waites	15	£2,750
6	(England) Gary Robson	12	£2,000
7	(Wales) Mark Webster	9	£1,500
8	(England) Chris Jones	6	£1,000
8	(England) Stuart Bousfield	6	£1,000
8	(Netherlands) Mareno Michels	6	£1,000
8	(Netherlands) Edwin Max	6	£1,000
8	(England) Robbie Green	6	£1,000
8	(Scotland) Mark Barilli	6	£1,000
8	(England) Alan Norris	6	£1,000
8	(Wales) Robert Hughes	6	£1,000

=== 2009 ===
Tournament	Winner	Runner-up	Semi finalists	Quarter finalists	Ref
BDO Welsh Open	(Scotland) Ross Montgomery	(Scotland) Mark Barilli	(England) Dougie Smith (England) Stuart Kellett	(England) Martin Atkins (Australia) Wayne Brown (England) Brian Derbyshire (England) Steve West	
BDO International Open	(England) Tony O'Shea	(England) Ted Hankey	(England) Steve Johnson (England) Joe Murnan	(England) Steve West (England) Scott Mitchell (England) Arthur Dobey (England) Steve O'Donnell	
BDO Gold Cup	(England) Paul Brooks	(England) Brian Woods	(England) Scott Mitchell (England) Dave Weston	(Scotland) Ewan Hyslop (England) Joe Murnan (Wales) David Smith-Hayes (England) Glenn Moody	
BDO British Classic	(England) Stephen Bunting	(England) Scott Waites	(England) Tony West (England) Dave Chisnall	(England) Darryl Fitton (Scotland) Mark Barilli (Republic of Ireland) Garrett Gray (England) Dave Weston	
BDO British Open	(England) Dave Chisnall	(England) Martin Atkins	(Scotland) Paul Hanvidge (England) Colin Fowler	(England) Martin Adams (England) Alan Norris (Northern Ireland) Daryl Gurney (Scotland) John Henderson	

2009 BDO International Grand Prix Series Final Standings

Pos	Player	Points	Money
1	(England) Dave Chisnall (c)	21	£12,000
2	(England) Paul Brooks	15	£3,750
2	(Scotland) Ross Montgomery	15	£3,750
2	(England) Stephen Bunting	15	£3,750
2	(England) Tony O'Shea	15	£3,750
6	(Scotland) Mark Barilli	12	£500
6	(England) Martin Atkins	12	£500
