= European Open (darts) =

PDC darts tournament

- Founded: 2027
- First season: 2027
- Organizing body: Professional Darts Corporation (PDC)
- Country: Austria

The European Open is a planned professional darts tournament that will be first held in Salzburg in Austria from 18-20 June of 2027, it was announced on 25 September 2026, alongside the release of the new calendar for 2027. The tournament will feature all PDC tour card holders.

It will be the second open tournament in professional darts, after the UK Open.

== History ==
In July 2026, it was announced by Professional Darts Corporation president Matt Porter that a new PDC major would come in 2027, as well as a new European Tour location. This would be the newest PDC major even since the foundation of the Players Championship Finals in 2009.

In September 2026, the new PDC calendar was announced for the 2027 year, which also announced the new European Open, the same tournament Porter had talked about almost 2 months earlier, it was decided to be held in Salzburg in Austria and will be first held on the 18 June until the 20 June in 2027.

== List of finals ==
Year	Champion	Score	Runner up
2027			

== Prize money evolution ==
Year	Prize money	Champion	Runner up
2027	750,000	TBD	TBD
