= Bobby Bourn Memorial Players Championship =

Tournament information
- Venue: Barnsley Metrodome
- Location: Barnsley
- Country: England
- Established: 2003
- Organisation(s): PDC
- Format: PDC Pro Tour Legs
- Prize fund: £34,600 (2011)
- Month(s) Played: June
- Final Year: 2011

Final champion(s)
- (England) Andy Smith

The Bobby Bourn Memorial Players Championship was a darts tournament staged by the Professional Darts Corporation (PDC). It originally took place as a warm up to the Stan James World Matchplay in Blackpool every July. However, in 2009, the tournament moved to a new date in January and a new venue at the Doncaster Dome. In 2010, the tournament was moved to spring and held at the Barnsley Metrodome.

The tournament is named after Bobby Bourn, who had an extensive involvement in the Whitley Bay darts league for over 30 years until his death in 2002. Bourn also performed the role of "player marshal" at PDC televised events, providing assistance to the professional players when they competed and ensuring they were in the right place at the right time before going out for matches.

Phil Taylor won the tournament in its first six years, however he missed the next three events, which were won by Terry Jenkins, Simon Whitlock, and Andy Smith.

== Previous finals ==
Year	Winner	Score	Runner-up	Prize fund
2011	(England) Andy Smith	6–2 (l)	(England) Dave Chisnall	(Prize fund £34,600)
2010	(Australia) Simon Whitlock	6–4 (l)	(Scotland) Gary Anderson	(Prize fund £31,200)
2009	(England) Terry Jenkins	6–3 (l)	(England) Mark Dudbridge	(Prize fund £29,600)
2008	(England) Phil Taylor	3–0 (s)	(England) Ronnie Baxter	(Prize fund £19,600)
2007	(England) Phil Taylor	3–1 (s)	(England) Adrian Lewis	(Prize fund £19,600)
2006	(England) Phil Taylor	3–1 (s)	(Netherlands) Roland Scholten	(Prize fund £19,600)
2005	(England) Phil Taylor	3–0 (s)	(England) Wayne Mardle	(Prize fund £19,600)
2004	(England) Phil Taylor	beat	(England) Andy Jenkins	
2003	(England) Phil Taylor	7–2 (l)	(Canada) John Part	
