= 2009 Grand Slam of Darts =

2009 PartyPoker.com Grand Slam of Darts

Tournament information
- Dates: 14–22 November 2009
- Venue: Wolverhampton Civic Hall
- Location: Wolverhampton
- Country: England
- Organisation(s): PDC
- Format: Legs
- Prize fund: £400,000
- Winner's share: £100,000
- High checkout: 170 (England) Phil Taylor (England) Kevin McDine

Champion(s)
- (England) Phil Taylor

The 2009 PartyPoker.com Grand Slam of Darts was the third staging of the darts tournament, the Grand Slam of Darts organised by the Professional Darts Corporation. The event took place from 14 to 22 November 2009 at the Wolverhampton Civic Hall, Wolverhampton, England. Television coverage of the tournament was covered by ITV Sport, with live coverage on ITV4 and highlights on ITV1.

Despite being beaten by Vincent van der Voort in the group stages, Phil Taylor won a third consecutive Grand Slam with a 16–2 victory over Scott Waites, who became the first BDO player to reach the final of this tournament.

== Prize money ==
The prize fund increased to £400,000 for the 2009 edition of the tournament, an increase of £44,000 from the 2008 edition, £10,000 more for the runner up, £5,000 more for the semi-finalists and £2,500 more for the quarter-finalists. Players who failed to make it past the group stage in the last tournament got £4,000. However, players who finished 3rd would earn £1,000 more but players who finished bottom of a group would get £1,500 less. Also the player with the highest checkout would not be rewarded. Instead, the group winners would earn £2,500.

Position (num. of players)		Prize money (Total: £400,000)
Winner	(1)	£100,000
Runner-up	(1)	£50,000
Semi-finalists	(2)	£25,000
Quarter-finalists	(4)	£15,000
Last 16 (second round)	(8)	£7,500
Third in group	(8)	£5,000
Fourth in group	(8)	£2,500
Group winner bonus	(8)	£2,500

== Qualifying ==
There were numerous tournaments that provided qualifying opportunities to players. Most tournaments offered a qualifying position for the winner and runner-up of the tournament, however the World Championships and the Grand Slams offers a place in the tournament to all semi-finalists. There are also various other ways of qualifying for overseas players, including those from Australia and the United States, as well as a wildcard qualifying event open to any darts player. Some minor changes were made to the qualifying criteria from 2008. The winner and the runner-up of the 2009 Championship League Darts would be invited, whilst it was announced that only the winner of the 2008 World Masters would be invited (though runner-up Scott Waites was invited anyway due to the withdrawal of Martin Adams). It was also announced that the winner of the 2009 US Open would be invited, though this was later withdrawn from the qualification criteria.

=== Qualifying tournaments ===
==== PDC ====
Tournament	Year	Position	Player	Qualifiers
Grand Slam of Darts	2007	Winner	(England) Phil Taylor	(England) Phil Taylor (England) Andy Hamilton (England) Kevin McDine (Scotland) Gary Anderson (England) Terry Jenkins (England) Mervyn King (Canada) John Part (England) Kirk Shepherd (England) Kevin Painter (England) Wayne Mardle (Netherlands) Raymond van Barneveld (England) James Wade (United States) Gary Mawson (England) Colin Osborne (England) Colin Lloyd (England) Denis Ovens (Netherlands) Co Stompé (England) Adrian Lewis (England) Steve Beaton (Scotland) Robert Thornton
Grand Slam of Darts	2007	Runner-Up	(England) Andy Hamilton	(England) Phil Taylor (England) Andy Hamilton (England) Kevin McDine (Scotland) Gary Anderson (England) Terry Jenkins (England) Mervyn King (Canada) John Part (England) Kirk Shepherd (England) Kevin Painter (England) Wayne Mardle (Netherlands) Raymond van Barneveld (England) James Wade (United States) Gary Mawson (England) Colin Osborne (England) Colin Lloyd (England) Denis Ovens (Netherlands) Co Stompé (England) Adrian Lewis (England) Steve Beaton (Scotland) Robert Thornton
Grand Slam of Darts	2007	Semi-finalists	(England) Kevin McDine (Scotland) Gary Anderson	(England) Phil Taylor (England) Andy Hamilton (England) Kevin McDine (Scotland) Gary Anderson (England) Terry Jenkins (England) Mervyn King (Canada) John Part (England) Kirk Shepherd (England) Kevin Painter (England) Wayne Mardle (Netherlands) Raymond van Barneveld (England) James Wade (United States) Gary Mawson (England) Colin Osborne (England) Colin Lloyd (England) Denis Ovens (Netherlands) Co Stompé (England) Adrian Lewis (England) Steve Beaton (Scotland) Robert Thornton
Grand Slam of Darts	2008	Winner	(England) Phil Taylor	(England) Phil Taylor (England) Andy Hamilton (England) Kevin McDine (Scotland) Gary Anderson (England) Terry Jenkins (England) Mervyn King (Canada) John Part (England) Kirk Shepherd (England) Kevin Painter (England) Wayne Mardle (Netherlands) Raymond van Barneveld (England) James Wade (United States) Gary Mawson (England) Colin Osborne (England) Colin Lloyd (England) Denis Ovens (Netherlands) Co Stompé (England) Adrian Lewis (England) Steve Beaton (Scotland) Robert Thornton
Grand Slam of Darts	2008	Runner-Up	(England) Terry Jenkins	(England) Phil Taylor (England) Andy Hamilton (England) Kevin McDine (Scotland) Gary Anderson (England) Terry Jenkins (England) Mervyn King (Canada) John Part (England) Kirk Shepherd (England) Kevin Painter (England) Wayne Mardle (Netherlands) Raymond van Barneveld (England) James Wade (United States) Gary Mawson (England) Colin Osborne (England) Colin Lloyd (England) Denis Ovens (Netherlands) Co Stompé (England) Adrian Lewis (England) Steve Beaton (Scotland) Robert Thornton
Grand Slam of Darts	2008	Semi-finalists	(England) Mervyn King (Scotland) Gary Anderson	(England) Phil Taylor (England) Andy Hamilton (England) Kevin McDine (Scotland) Gary Anderson (England) Terry Jenkins (England) Mervyn King (Canada) John Part (England) Kirk Shepherd (England) Kevin Painter (England) Wayne Mardle (Netherlands) Raymond van Barneveld (England) James Wade (United States) Gary Mawson (England) Colin Osborne (England) Colin Lloyd (England) Denis Ovens (Netherlands) Co Stompé (England) Adrian Lewis (England) Steve Beaton (Scotland) Robert Thornton
PDC World Darts Championship	2008	Winner	(Canada) John Part	(England) Phil Taylor (England) Andy Hamilton (England) Kevin McDine (Scotland) Gary Anderson (England) Terry Jenkins (England) Mervyn King (Canada) John Part (England) Kirk Shepherd (England) Kevin Painter (England) Wayne Mardle (Netherlands) Raymond van Barneveld (England) James Wade (United States) Gary Mawson (England) Colin Osborne (England) Colin Lloyd (England) Denis Ovens (Netherlands) Co Stompé (England) Adrian Lewis (England) Steve Beaton (Scotland) Robert Thornton
PDC World Darts Championship	2008	Runner-Up	(England) Kirk Shepherd	(England) Phil Taylor (England) Andy Hamilton (England) Kevin McDine (Scotland) Gary Anderson (England) Terry Jenkins (England) Mervyn King (Canada) John Part (England) Kirk Shepherd (England) Kevin Painter (England) Wayne Mardle (Netherlands) Raymond van Barneveld (England) James Wade (United States) Gary Mawson (England) Colin Osborne (England) Colin Lloyd (England) Denis Ovens (Netherlands) Co Stompé (England) Adrian Lewis (England) Steve Beaton (Scotland) Robert Thornton
PDC World Darts Championship	2008	Semi-finalists	(England) Kevin Painter (England) Wayne Mardle	(England) Phil Taylor (England) Andy Hamilton (England) Kevin McDine (Scotland) Gary Anderson (England) Terry Jenkins (England) Mervyn King (Canada) John Part (England) Kirk Shepherd (England) Kevin Painter (England) Wayne Mardle (Netherlands) Raymond van Barneveld (England) James Wade (United States) Gary Mawson (England) Colin Osborne (England) Colin Lloyd (England) Denis Ovens (Netherlands) Co Stompé (England) Adrian Lewis (England) Steve Beaton (Scotland) Robert Thornton
PDC World Darts Championship	2009	Winner	(England) Phil Taylor	(England) Phil Taylor (England) Andy Hamilton (England) Kevin McDine (Scotland) Gary Anderson (England) Terry Jenkins (England) Mervyn King (Canada) John Part (England) Kirk Shepherd (England) Kevin Painter (England) Wayne Mardle (Netherlands) Raymond van Barneveld (England) James Wade (United States) Gary Mawson (England) Colin Osborne (England) Colin Lloyd (England) Denis Ovens (Netherlands) Co Stompé (England) Adrian Lewis (England) Steve Beaton (Scotland) Robert Thornton
PDC World Darts Championship	2009	Runner-Up	(Netherlands) Raymond van Barneveld	(England) Phil Taylor (England) Andy Hamilton (England) Kevin McDine (Scotland) Gary Anderson (England) Terry Jenkins (England) Mervyn King (Canada) John Part (England) Kirk Shepherd (England) Kevin Painter (England) Wayne Mardle (Netherlands) Raymond van Barneveld (England) James Wade (United States) Gary Mawson (England) Colin Osborne (England) Colin Lloyd (England) Denis Ovens (Netherlands) Co Stompé (England) Adrian Lewis (England) Steve Beaton (Scotland) Robert Thornton
PDC World Darts Championship	2009	Semi-finalists	(England) Mervyn King (England) James Wade	(England) Phil Taylor (England) Andy Hamilton (England) Kevin McDine (Scotland) Gary Anderson (England) Terry Jenkins (England) Mervyn King (Canada) John Part (England) Kirk Shepherd (England) Kevin Painter (England) Wayne Mardle (Netherlands) Raymond van Barneveld (England) James Wade (United States) Gary Mawson (England) Colin Osborne (England) Colin Lloyd (England) Denis Ovens (Netherlands) Co Stompé (England) Adrian Lewis (England) Steve Beaton (Scotland) Robert Thornton
World Matchplay	2008	Winner	(England) Phil Taylor	(England) Phil Taylor (England) Andy Hamilton (England) Kevin McDine (Scotland) Gary Anderson (England) Terry Jenkins (England) Mervyn King (Canada) John Part (England) Kirk Shepherd (England) Kevin Painter (England) Wayne Mardle (Netherlands) Raymond van Barneveld (England) James Wade (United States) Gary Mawson (England) Colin Osborne (England) Colin Lloyd (England) Denis Ovens (Netherlands) Co Stompé (England) Adrian Lewis (England) Steve Beaton (Scotland) Robert Thornton
World Matchplay	2008	Runner-Up	(England) James Wade	(England) Phil Taylor (England) Andy Hamilton (England) Kevin McDine (Scotland) Gary Anderson (England) Terry Jenkins (England) Mervyn King (Canada) John Part (England) Kirk Shepherd (England) Kevin Painter (England) Wayne Mardle (Netherlands) Raymond van Barneveld (England) James Wade (United States) Gary Mawson (England) Colin Osborne (England) Colin Lloyd (England) Denis Ovens (Netherlands) Co Stompé (England) Adrian Lewis (England) Steve Beaton (Scotland) Robert Thornton
World Matchplay	2009	Winner	(England) Phil Taylor	(England) Phil Taylor (England) Andy Hamilton (England) Kevin McDine (Scotland) Gary Anderson (England) Terry Jenkins (England) Mervyn King (Canada) John Part (England) Kirk Shepherd (England) Kevin Painter (England) Wayne Mardle (Netherlands) Raymond van Barneveld (England) James Wade (United States) Gary Mawson (England) Colin Osborne (England) Colin Lloyd (England) Denis Ovens (Netherlands) Co Stompé (England) Adrian Lewis (England) Steve Beaton (Scotland) Robert Thornton
World Matchplay	2009	Runner-Up	(England) Terry Jenkins	(England) Phil Taylor (England) Andy Hamilton (England) Kevin McDine (Scotland) Gary Anderson (England) Terry Jenkins (England) Mervyn King (Canada) John Part (England) Kirk Shepherd (England) Kevin Painter (England) Wayne Mardle (Netherlands) Raymond van Barneveld (England) James Wade (United States) Gary Mawson (England) Colin Osborne (England) Colin Lloyd (England) Denis Ovens (Netherlands) Co Stompé (England) Adrian Lewis (England) Steve Beaton (Scotland) Robert Thornton
World Grand Prix	2008	Winner	(England) Phil Taylor	(England) Phil Taylor (England) Andy Hamilton (England) Kevin McDine (Scotland) Gary Anderson (England) Terry Jenkins (England) Mervyn King (Canada) John Part (England) Kirk Shepherd (England) Kevin Painter (England) Wayne Mardle (Netherlands) Raymond van Barneveld (England) James Wade (United States) Gary Mawson (England) Colin Osborne (England) Colin Lloyd (England) Denis Ovens (Netherlands) Co Stompé (England) Adrian Lewis (England) Steve Beaton (Scotland) Robert Thornton
World Grand Prix	2008	Runner-Up	(Netherlands) Raymond van Barneveld	(England) Phil Taylor (England) Andy Hamilton (England) Kevin McDine (Scotland) Gary Anderson (England) Terry Jenkins (England) Mervyn King (Canada) John Part (England) Kirk Shepherd (England) Kevin Painter (England) Wayne Mardle (Netherlands) Raymond van Barneveld (England) James Wade (United States) Gary Mawson (England) Colin Osborne (England) Colin Lloyd (England) Denis Ovens (Netherlands) Co Stompé (England) Adrian Lewis (England) Steve Beaton (Scotland) Robert Thornton
World Grand Prix	2009	Winner	(England) Phil Taylor	(England) Phil Taylor (England) Andy Hamilton (England) Kevin McDine (Scotland) Gary Anderson (England) Terry Jenkins (England) Mervyn King (Canada) John Part (England) Kirk Shepherd (England) Kevin Painter (England) Wayne Mardle (Netherlands) Raymond van Barneveld (England) James Wade (United States) Gary Mawson (England) Colin Osborne (England) Colin Lloyd (England) Denis Ovens (Netherlands) Co Stompé (England) Adrian Lewis (England) Steve Beaton (Scotland) Robert Thornton
World Grand Prix	2009	Runner-Up	(Netherlands) Raymond van Barneveld	(England) Phil Taylor (England) Andy Hamilton (England) Kevin McDine (Scotland) Gary Anderson (England) Terry Jenkins (England) Mervyn King (Canada) John Part (England) Kirk Shepherd (England) Kevin Painter (England) Wayne Mardle (Netherlands) Raymond van Barneveld (England) James Wade (United States) Gary Mawson (England) Colin Osborne (England) Colin Lloyd (England) Denis Ovens (Netherlands) Co Stompé (England) Adrian Lewis (England) Steve Beaton (Scotland) Robert Thornton
Las Vegas Desert Classic	2008	Winner	(England) Phil Taylor	(England) Phil Taylor (England) Andy Hamilton (England) Kevin McDine (Scotland) Gary Anderson (England) Terry Jenkins (England) Mervyn King (Canada) John Part (England) Kirk Shepherd (England) Kevin Painter (England) Wayne Mardle (Netherlands) Raymond van Barneveld (England) James Wade (United States) Gary Mawson (England) Colin Osborne (England) Colin Lloyd (England) Denis Ovens (Netherlands) Co Stompé (England) Adrian Lewis (England) Steve Beaton (Scotland) Robert Thornton
Las Vegas Desert Classic	2008	Runner-Up	(England) James Wade	(England) Phil Taylor (England) Andy Hamilton (England) Kevin McDine (Scotland) Gary Anderson (England) Terry Jenkins (England) Mervyn King (Canada) John Part (England) Kirk Shepherd (England) Kevin Painter (England) Wayne Mardle (Netherlands) Raymond van Barneveld (England) James Wade (United States) Gary Mawson (England) Colin Osborne (England) Colin Lloyd (England) Denis Ovens (Netherlands) Co Stompé (England) Adrian Lewis (England) Steve Beaton (Scotland) Robert Thornton
Las Vegas Desert Classic	2009	Winner	(England) Phil Taylor	(England) Phil Taylor (England) Andy Hamilton (England) Kevin McDine (Scotland) Gary Anderson (England) Terry Jenkins (England) Mervyn King (Canada) John Part (England) Kirk Shepherd (England) Kevin Painter (England) Wayne Mardle (Netherlands) Raymond van Barneveld (England) James Wade (United States) Gary Mawson (England) Colin Osborne (England) Colin Lloyd (England) Denis Ovens (Netherlands) Co Stompé (England) Adrian Lewis (England) Steve Beaton (Scotland) Robert Thornton
Las Vegas Desert Classic	2009	Runner-Up	(Netherlands) Raymond van Barneveld	(England) Phil Taylor (England) Andy Hamilton (England) Kevin McDine (Scotland) Gary Anderson (England) Terry Jenkins (England) Mervyn King (Canada) John Part (England) Kirk Shepherd (England) Kevin Painter (England) Wayne Mardle (Netherlands) Raymond van Barneveld (England) James Wade (United States) Gary Mawson (England) Colin Osborne (England) Colin Lloyd (England) Denis Ovens (Netherlands) Co Stompé (England) Adrian Lewis (England) Steve Beaton (Scotland) Robert Thornton
UK Open	2008	Winner	(England) James Wade	(England) Phil Taylor (England) Andy Hamilton (England) Kevin McDine (Scotland) Gary Anderson (England) Terry Jenkins (England) Mervyn King (Canada) John Part (England) Kirk Shepherd (England) Kevin Painter (England) Wayne Mardle (Netherlands) Raymond van Barneveld (England) James Wade (United States) Gary Mawson (England) Colin Osborne (England) Colin Lloyd (England) Denis Ovens (Netherlands) Co Stompé (England) Adrian Lewis (England) Steve Beaton (Scotland) Robert Thornton
UK Open	2008	Runner-Up	(United States) Gary Mawson	(England) Phil Taylor (England) Andy Hamilton (England) Kevin McDine (Scotland) Gary Anderson (England) Terry Jenkins (England) Mervyn King (Canada) John Part (England) Kirk Shepherd (England) Kevin Painter (England) Wayne Mardle (Netherlands) Raymond van Barneveld (England) James Wade (United States) Gary Mawson (England) Colin Osborne (England) Colin Lloyd (England) Denis Ovens (Netherlands) Co Stompé (England) Adrian Lewis (England) Steve Beaton (Scotland) Robert Thornton
UK Open	2009	Winner	(England) Phil Taylor	(England) Phil Taylor (England) Andy Hamilton (England) Kevin McDine (Scotland) Gary Anderson (England) Terry Jenkins (England) Mervyn King (Canada) John Part (England) Kirk Shepherd (England) Kevin Painter (England) Wayne Mardle (Netherlands) Raymond van Barneveld (England) James Wade (United States) Gary Mawson (England) Colin Osborne (England) Colin Lloyd (England) Denis Ovens (Netherlands) Co Stompé (England) Adrian Lewis (England) Steve Beaton (Scotland) Robert Thornton
UK Open	2009	Runner-Up	(England) Colin Osborne	(England) Phil Taylor (England) Andy Hamilton (England) Kevin McDine (Scotland) Gary Anderson (England) Terry Jenkins (England) Mervyn King (Canada) John Part (England) Kirk Shepherd (England) Kevin Painter (England) Wayne Mardle (Netherlands) Raymond van Barneveld (England) James Wade (United States) Gary Mawson (England) Colin Osborne (England) Colin Lloyd (England) Denis Ovens (Netherlands) Co Stompé (England) Adrian Lewis (England) Steve Beaton (Scotland) Robert Thornton
US Open	2008	Winner	(England) Phil Taylor	(England) Phil Taylor (England) Andy Hamilton (England) Kevin McDine (Scotland) Gary Anderson (England) Terry Jenkins (England) Mervyn King (Canada) John Part (England) Kirk Shepherd (England) Kevin Painter (England) Wayne Mardle (Netherlands) Raymond van Barneveld (England) James Wade (United States) Gary Mawson (England) Colin Osborne (England) Colin Lloyd (England) Denis Ovens (Netherlands) Co Stompé (England) Adrian Lewis (England) Steve Beaton (Scotland) Robert Thornton
US Open	2008	Runner-Up	(England) Colin Lloyd	(England) Phil Taylor (England) Andy Hamilton (England) Kevin McDine (Scotland) Gary Anderson (England) Terry Jenkins (England) Mervyn King (Canada) John Part (England) Kirk Shepherd (England) Kevin Painter (England) Wayne Mardle (Netherlands) Raymond van Barneveld (England) James Wade (United States) Gary Mawson (England) Colin Osborne (England) Colin Lloyd (England) Denis Ovens (Netherlands) Co Stompé (England) Adrian Lewis (England) Steve Beaton (Scotland) Robert Thornton
Premier League Darts	2008	Winner	(England) Phil Taylor	(England) Phil Taylor (England) Andy Hamilton (England) Kevin McDine (Scotland) Gary Anderson (England) Terry Jenkins (England) Mervyn King (Canada) John Part (England) Kirk Shepherd (England) Kevin Painter (England) Wayne Mardle (Netherlands) Raymond van Barneveld (England) James Wade (United States) Gary Mawson (England) Colin Osborne (England) Colin Lloyd (England) Denis Ovens (Netherlands) Co Stompé (England) Adrian Lewis (England) Steve Beaton (Scotland) Robert Thornton
Premier League Darts	2008	Runner-Up	(England) James Wade	(England) Phil Taylor (England) Andy Hamilton (England) Kevin McDine (Scotland) Gary Anderson (England) Terry Jenkins (England) Mervyn King (Canada) John Part (England) Kirk Shepherd (England) Kevin Painter (England) Wayne Mardle (Netherlands) Raymond van Barneveld (England) James Wade (United States) Gary Mawson (England) Colin Osborne (England) Colin Lloyd (England) Denis Ovens (Netherlands) Co Stompé (England) Adrian Lewis (England) Steve Beaton (Scotland) Robert Thornton
Premier League Darts	2009	Winner	(England) James Wade	(England) Phil Taylor (England) Andy Hamilton (England) Kevin McDine (Scotland) Gary Anderson (England) Terry Jenkins (England) Mervyn King (Canada) John Part (England) Kirk Shepherd (England) Kevin Painter (England) Wayne Mardle (Netherlands) Raymond van Barneveld (England) James Wade (United States) Gary Mawson (England) Colin Osborne (England) Colin Lloyd (England) Denis Ovens (Netherlands) Co Stompé (England) Adrian Lewis (England) Steve Beaton (Scotland) Robert Thornton
Premier League Darts	2009	Runner-Up	(England) Mervyn King	(England) Phil Taylor (England) Andy Hamilton (England) Kevin McDine (Scotland) Gary Anderson (England) Terry Jenkins (England) Mervyn King (Canada) John Part (England) Kirk Shepherd (England) Kevin Painter (England) Wayne Mardle (Netherlands) Raymond van Barneveld (England) James Wade (United States) Gary Mawson (England) Colin Osborne (England) Colin Lloyd (England) Denis Ovens (Netherlands) Co Stompé (England) Adrian Lewis (England) Steve Beaton (Scotland) Robert Thornton
German Darts Championship	2007	Winner	(England) Phil Taylor	(England) Phil Taylor (England) Andy Hamilton (England) Kevin McDine (Scotland) Gary Anderson (England) Terry Jenkins (England) Mervyn King (Canada) John Part (England) Kirk Shepherd (England) Kevin Painter (England) Wayne Mardle (Netherlands) Raymond van Barneveld (England) James Wade (United States) Gary Mawson (England) Colin Osborne (England) Colin Lloyd (England) Denis Ovens (Netherlands) Co Stompé (England) Adrian Lewis (England) Steve Beaton (Scotland) Robert Thornton
German Darts Championship	2007	Runner-Up	(England) Denis Ovens	(England) Phil Taylor (England) Andy Hamilton (England) Kevin McDine (Scotland) Gary Anderson (England) Terry Jenkins (England) Mervyn King (Canada) John Part (England) Kirk Shepherd (England) Kevin Painter (England) Wayne Mardle (Netherlands) Raymond van Barneveld (England) James Wade (United States) Gary Mawson (England) Colin Osborne (England) Colin Lloyd (England) Denis Ovens (Netherlands) Co Stompé (England) Adrian Lewis (England) Steve Beaton (Scotland) Robert Thornton
German Darts Championship	2008	Winner	(Netherlands) Co Stompé	(England) Phil Taylor (England) Andy Hamilton (England) Kevin McDine (Scotland) Gary Anderson (England) Terry Jenkins (England) Mervyn King (Canada) John Part (England) Kirk Shepherd (England) Kevin Painter (England) Wayne Mardle (Netherlands) Raymond van Barneveld (England) James Wade (United States) Gary Mawson (England) Colin Osborne (England) Colin Lloyd (England) Denis Ovens (Netherlands) Co Stompé (England) Adrian Lewis (England) Steve Beaton (Scotland) Robert Thornton
German Darts Championship	2008	Runner-Up	(England) Phil Taylor	(England) Phil Taylor (England) Andy Hamilton (England) Kevin McDine (Scotland) Gary Anderson (England) Terry Jenkins (England) Mervyn King (Canada) John Part (England) Kirk Shepherd (England) Kevin Painter (England) Wayne Mardle (Netherlands) Raymond van Barneveld (England) James Wade (United States) Gary Mawson (England) Colin Osborne (England) Colin Lloyd (England) Denis Ovens (Netherlands) Co Stompé (England) Adrian Lewis (England) Steve Beaton (Scotland) Robert Thornton
European Championship	2008	Winner	(England) Phil Taylor	(England) Phil Taylor (England) Andy Hamilton (England) Kevin McDine (Scotland) Gary Anderson (England) Terry Jenkins (England) Mervyn King (Canada) John Part (England) Kirk Shepherd (England) Kevin Painter (England) Wayne Mardle (Netherlands) Raymond van Barneveld (England) James Wade (United States) Gary Mawson (England) Colin Osborne (England) Colin Lloyd (England) Denis Ovens (Netherlands) Co Stompé (England) Adrian Lewis (England) Steve Beaton (Scotland) Robert Thornton
European Championship	2008	Runner-Up	(England) Adrian Lewis	(England) Phil Taylor (England) Andy Hamilton (England) Kevin McDine (Scotland) Gary Anderson (England) Terry Jenkins (England) Mervyn King (Canada) John Part (England) Kirk Shepherd (England) Kevin Painter (England) Wayne Mardle (Netherlands) Raymond van Barneveld (England) James Wade (United States) Gary Mawson (England) Colin Osborne (England) Colin Lloyd (England) Denis Ovens (Netherlands) Co Stompé (England) Adrian Lewis (England) Steve Beaton (Scotland) Robert Thornton
European Championship	2009	Winner	(England) Phil Taylor	(England) Phil Taylor (England) Andy Hamilton (England) Kevin McDine (Scotland) Gary Anderson (England) Terry Jenkins (England) Mervyn King (Canada) John Part (England) Kirk Shepherd (England) Kevin Painter (England) Wayne Mardle (Netherlands) Raymond van Barneveld (England) James Wade (United States) Gary Mawson (England) Colin Osborne (England) Colin Lloyd (England) Denis Ovens (Netherlands) Co Stompé (England) Adrian Lewis (England) Steve Beaton (Scotland) Robert Thornton
European Championship	2009	Runner-Up	(England) Steve Beaton	(England) Phil Taylor (England) Andy Hamilton (England) Kevin McDine (Scotland) Gary Anderson (England) Terry Jenkins (England) Mervyn King (Canada) John Part (England) Kirk Shepherd (England) Kevin Painter (England) Wayne Mardle (Netherlands) Raymond van Barneveld (England) James Wade (United States) Gary Mawson (England) Colin Osborne (England) Colin Lloyd (England) Denis Ovens (Netherlands) Co Stompé (England) Adrian Lewis (England) Steve Beaton (Scotland) Robert Thornton
Championship League Darts	2008	Winner	(England) Phil Taylor	(England) Phil Taylor (England) Andy Hamilton (England) Kevin McDine (Scotland) Gary Anderson (England) Terry Jenkins (England) Mervyn King (Canada) John Part (England) Kirk Shepherd (England) Kevin Painter (England) Wayne Mardle (Netherlands) Raymond van Barneveld (England) James Wade (United States) Gary Mawson (England) Colin Osborne (England) Colin Lloyd (England) Denis Ovens (Netherlands) Co Stompé (England) Adrian Lewis (England) Steve Beaton (Scotland) Robert Thornton
Championship League Darts	2009	Winner	(England) Colin Osborne	(England) Phil Taylor (England) Andy Hamilton (England) Kevin McDine (Scotland) Gary Anderson (England) Terry Jenkins (England) Mervyn King (Canada) John Part (England) Kirk Shepherd (England) Kevin Painter (England) Wayne Mardle (Netherlands) Raymond van Barneveld (England) James Wade (United States) Gary Mawson (England) Colin Osborne (England) Colin Lloyd (England) Denis Ovens (Netherlands) Co Stompé (England) Adrian Lewis (England) Steve Beaton (Scotland) Robert Thornton
Championship League Darts	2009	Runner-Up	(England) Phil Taylor	(England) Phil Taylor (England) Andy Hamilton (England) Kevin McDine (Scotland) Gary Anderson (England) Terry Jenkins (England) Mervyn King (Canada) John Part (England) Kirk Shepherd (England) Kevin Painter (England) Wayne Mardle (Netherlands) Raymond van Barneveld (England) James Wade (United States) Gary Mawson (England) Colin Osborne (England) Colin Lloyd (England) Denis Ovens (Netherlands) Co Stompé (England) Adrian Lewis (England) Steve Beaton (Scotland) Robert Thornton
Players Championship Finals	2009	Winner	(England) Phil Taylor	(England) Phil Taylor (England) Andy Hamilton (England) Kevin McDine (Scotland) Gary Anderson (England) Terry Jenkins (England) Mervyn King (Canada) John Part (England) Kirk Shepherd (England) Kevin Painter (England) Wayne Mardle (Netherlands) Raymond van Barneveld (England) James Wade (United States) Gary Mawson (England) Colin Osborne (England) Colin Lloyd (England) Denis Ovens (Netherlands) Co Stompé (England) Adrian Lewis (England) Steve Beaton (Scotland) Robert Thornton
Players Championship Finals	2009	Runner-Up	(Scotland) Robert Thornton	(England) Phil Taylor (England) Andy Hamilton (England) Kevin McDine (Scotland) Gary Anderson (England) Terry Jenkins (England) Mervyn King (Canada) John Part (England) Kirk Shepherd (England) Kevin Painter (England) Wayne Mardle (Netherlands) Raymond van Barneveld (England) James Wade (United States) Gary Mawson (England) Colin Osborne (England) Colin Lloyd (England) Denis Ovens (Netherlands) Co Stompé (England) Adrian Lewis (England) Steve Beaton (Scotland) Robert Thornton
Note: Players in italics had already qualified for the tournament.				(England) Phil Taylor (England) Andy Hamilton (England) Kevin McDine (Scotland) Gary Anderson (England) Terry Jenkins (England) Mervyn King (Canada) John Part (England) Kirk Shepherd (England) Kevin Painter (England) Wayne Mardle (Netherlands) Raymond van Barneveld (England) James Wade (United States) Gary Mawson (England) Colin Osborne (England) Colin Lloyd (England) Denis Ovens (Netherlands) Co Stompé (England) Adrian Lewis (England) Steve Beaton (Scotland) Robert Thornton

==== BDO ====
Tournament	Year	Position	Player	Qualifiers
BDO World Darts Championship	2008	Winner	(Wales) Mark Webster	(Wales) Mark Webster (Australia) Simon Whitlock (England) Brian Woods (England) Ted Hankey (England) Tony O'Shea (England) Darryl Fitton (Russia) Anastasia Dobromyslova (Netherlands) Francis Hoenselaar (England) Scott Waites
BDO World Darts Championship	2008	Runner-Up	(Australia) Simon Whitlock	(Wales) Mark Webster (Australia) Simon Whitlock (England) Brian Woods (England) Ted Hankey (England) Tony O'Shea (England) Darryl Fitton (Russia) Anastasia Dobromyslova (Netherlands) Francis Hoenselaar (England) Scott Waites
BDO World Darts Championship	2008	Semi-finalists	~~(England) Martin Adams~~ (England) Brian Woods	(Wales) Mark Webster (Australia) Simon Whitlock (England) Brian Woods (England) Ted Hankey (England) Tony O'Shea (England) Darryl Fitton (Russia) Anastasia Dobromyslova (Netherlands) Francis Hoenselaar (England) Scott Waites
BDO World Darts Championship	2009	Winner	(England) Ted Hankey	(Wales) Mark Webster (Australia) Simon Whitlock (England) Brian Woods (England) Ted Hankey (England) Tony O'Shea (England) Darryl Fitton (Russia) Anastasia Dobromyslova (Netherlands) Francis Hoenselaar (England) Scott Waites
BDO World Darts Championship	2009	Runner-Up	(England) Tony O'Shea	(Wales) Mark Webster (Australia) Simon Whitlock (England) Brian Woods (England) Ted Hankey (England) Tony O'Shea (England) Darryl Fitton (Russia) Anastasia Dobromyslova (Netherlands) Francis Hoenselaar (England) Scott Waites
BDO World Darts Championship	2009	Semi-finalists	(England) Darryl Fitton; ~~(England) Martin Adams~~	(Wales) Mark Webster (Australia) Simon Whitlock (England) Brian Woods (England) Ted Hankey (England) Tony O'Shea (England) Darryl Fitton (Russia) Anastasia Dobromyslova (Netherlands) Francis Hoenselaar (England) Scott Waites
Women's World Championship	2008	Winner	(Russia) Anastasia Dobromyslova	(Wales) Mark Webster (Australia) Simon Whitlock (England) Brian Woods (England) Ted Hankey (England) Tony O'Shea (England) Darryl Fitton (Russia) Anastasia Dobromyslova (Netherlands) Francis Hoenselaar (England) Scott Waites
Women's World Championship	2009	Winner	(Netherlands) Francis Hoenselaar	(Wales) Mark Webster (Australia) Simon Whitlock (England) Brian Woods (England) Ted Hankey (England) Tony O'Shea (England) Darryl Fitton (Russia) Anastasia Dobromyslova (Netherlands) Francis Hoenselaar (England) Scott Waites
World Masters	2007	Winner	(Scotland) Robert Thornton	(Wales) Mark Webster (Australia) Simon Whitlock (England) Brian Woods (England) Ted Hankey (England) Tony O'Shea (England) Darryl Fitton (Russia) Anastasia Dobromyslova (Netherlands) Francis Hoenselaar (England) Scott Waites
World Masters	2008	~~Winner~~	~~(England) Martin Adams~~	(Wales) Mark Webster (Australia) Simon Whitlock (England) Brian Woods (England) Ted Hankey (England) Tony O'Shea (England) Darryl Fitton (Russia) Anastasia Dobromyslova (Netherlands) Francis Hoenselaar (England) Scott Waites
World Masters	2008	Runner-Up	(England) Scott Waites*	(Wales) Mark Webster (Australia) Simon Whitlock (England) Brian Woods (England) Ted Hankey (England) Tony O'Shea (England) Darryl Fitton (Russia) Anastasia Dobromyslova (Netherlands) Francis Hoenselaar (England) Scott Waites
Note: Players in italics had already qualified for the tournament.				(Wales) Mark Webster (Australia) Simon Whitlock (England) Brian Woods (England) Ted Hankey (England) Tony O'Shea (England) Darryl Fitton (Russia) Anastasia Dobromyslova (Netherlands) Francis Hoenselaar (England) Scott Waites

==== Other Qualifiers ====
Criteria	Player
DPA Order of Merit Leader	(Australia) Simon Whitlock
PDC North America Order of Merit Leader	(United States) Darin Young
European Order of Merit Leader	(Netherlands) Vincent van der Voort
ITV Wildcard Qualifier	(England) Steve Maish
Note: Players in italics had already qualified for the tournament.

== Pools ==
Pool A	Pool B	Pool C	Pool D
(Seeded Players)	(qualifiers)		
(England) Phil Taylor (1) (England) Ted Hankey (2) (England) James Wade (3) (Netherlands) Raymond van Barneveld (4) (England) Mervyn King (5) (England) Terry Jenkins (6) (Scotland) Gary Anderson (7) (England) Tony O'Shea (8)	(England) Steve Beaton (England) Darryl Fitton (England) Adrian Lewis (England) Colin Osborne (Canada) John Part (Scotland) Robert Thornton (Wales) Mark Webster (Australia) Simon Whitlock	(England) Andy Hamilton (England) Colin Lloyd (England) Wayne Mardle (England) Kevin Painter (Netherlands) Co Stompé (Netherlands) Vincent van der Voort (United States) Darin Young (England) Steve Maish	(Russia) Anastasia Dobromyslova (Netherlands) Francis Hoenselaar (England) Kevin McDine (United States) Gary Mawson (England) Denis Ovens (England) Kirk Shepherd (England) Scott Waites (England) Brian Woods

== Draw ==
=== Group stages ===
all matches first-to-5/best of 9.
NB in Brackets: Number = Seeds; BDO = BDO Darts player; Q = Qualifier
NB: P = Played; W = Won; L = Lost; LF = Legs for; LA = Legs against; +/- = Plus/minus record, in relation to legs; Average = 3-dart average; Pts = Points

==== Group A ====
POS	Player	P	W	L	LF	LA	+/-	Pts	Status
1	(England) Phil Taylor (1)	3	2	1	11	5	+6	4	Advance to the last 16
2	(Wales) Mark Webster	3	2	1	10	10	0	4	Advance to the last 16
3	(Netherlands) Vincent van der Voort (Q)	3	1	2	12	11	+1	2	Eliminated
4	(Russia) Anastasia Dobromyslova	3	1	2	7	14	−7	2	Eliminated

14 November

105.85 Phil Taylor (England)	5 – 0	(Russia) Anastasia Dobromyslova 81.30
99.93 Mark Webster (Wales)	5 – 3	(Netherlands) Vincent van der Voort 91.42

15 November

87.20 Anastasia Dobromyslova (Russia)	5 – 4	(Netherlands) Vincent van der Voort 81.35
105.85 Phil Taylor (England)	5 – 0	(Wales) Mark Webster 83.00

17 November

82.93 Anastasia Dobromyslova (Russia)	2 – 5	(Wales) Mark Webster 90.65
93.61 Vincent van der Voort (Netherlands)	5 – 1	(England) Phil Taylor 90.20

==== Group B ====
POS	Player	P	W	L	LF	LA	+/-	Pts	Status
1	(England) Tony O'Shea (BDO, 8)	3	3	0	15	7	+8	6	Advance to the last 16
2	(England) Colin Lloyd	3	1	2	10	10	0	2	Advance to the last 16
3	(England) Colin Osborne	3	1	2	11	13	−2	2	Eliminated
4	(England) Brian Woods (BDO)	3	1	2	8	14	−6	2	Eliminated

14 November

91.11 Tony O'Shea (England)	5 – 3	(England) Brian Woods 87.29
82.07 Colin Osborne (England)	5 – 3	(England) Colin Lloyd 85.69

15 November

96.30 Brian Woods (England)	0 – 5	(England) Colin Lloyd 101.55
98.91 Tony O'Shea (England)	5 – 2	(England) Colin Osborne 89.50

17 November

84.86 Colin Lloyd (England)	2 – 5	(England) Tony O'Shea 90.55
85.03 Brian Woods (England)	5 – 4	(England) Colin Osborne 87.00

==== Group C ====
POS	Player	P	W	L	LF	LA	+/-	Pts	Status
1	(England) Mervyn King (5)	3	2	1	14	9	+5	4	Advance to the last 16
2	(England) Kirk Shepherd	3	2	1	10	11	−1	4	Advance to the last 16
3	(England) Steve Maish (Q)	3	1	2	12	11	+1	2	Eliminated
4	(England) Darryl Fitton (BDO)	3	1	2	9	14	−5	2	Eliminated

14 November

98.88 Mervyn King (England)	5 – 0	(England) Kirk Shepherd 87.38
87.99 Darryl Fitton (England)	1 – 5	(England) Steve Maish 89.70

15 November

94.13 Kirk Shepherd (England)	5 – 3	(England) Darryl Fitton 93.51
86.12 Mervyn King (England)	5 – 4	(England) Steve Maish 86.35

17 November

85.36 Steve Maish (England)	3 – 5	(England) Kirk Shepherd 92.06
96.98 Darryl Fitton (England)	5 – 4	(England) Mervyn King 96.14

==== Group D ====
POS	Player	P	W	L	LF	LA	+/-	Pts	Status
1	(England) Kevin Painter	3	2	1	14	8	+6	4	Advance to the last 16
2	(Netherlands) Raymond van Barneveld (4)	3	2	1	14	10	+4	4	Advance to the last 16
3	(Canada) John Part	3	2	1	13	12	+1	4	Eliminated
4	(Netherlands) Francis Hoenselaar (BDO)	3	0	3	4	15	−11	0	Eliminated

14 November

91.14 Raymond van Barneveld (Netherlands)	5 – 1	(Netherlands) Francis Hoenselaar 77.02
93.29 John Part (Canada)	3 – 5	(England) Kevin Painter 100.74

15 November

78.13 Francis Hoenselaar (Netherlands)	3 – 5	(Canada) John Part 87.07
91.01 Raymond van Barneveld (Netherlands)	5 – 4	(England) Kevin Painter 90.26

17 November

79.95 Kevin Painter (England)	5 – 0	(Netherlands) Francis Hoenselaar 74.13
100.38 John Part (Canada)	5 – 4	(Netherlands) Raymond van Barneveld 99.33

==== Group E ====
POS	Player	P	W	L	LF	LA	+/-	Pts	Status
1	(Australia) Simon Whitlock	3	3	0	15	9	+6	6	Advance to the last 16
2	(England) Scott Waites (BDO)	3	2	1	14	8	+6	4	Advance to the last 16
3	(England) Ted Hankey (BDO, 2)	3	1	2	12	14	−2	2	Eliminated
4	(England) Wayne Mardle	3	0	3	5	15	−10	0	Eliminated

15 November

97.76 Simon Whitlock (Australia)	5 – 1	(England) Wayne Mardle 90.64
74.89 Ted Hankey (England)	3 – 5	(England) Scott Waites 79.49

16 November

79.12 Wayne Mardle (England)	4 – 5	(England) Ted Hankey 81.40
96.53 Simon Whitlock (Australia)	5 – 4	(England) Scott Waites 95.69

18 November

100.20 Scott Waites (England)	5 – 0	(England) Wayne Mardle 90.64
94.14 Ted Hankey (England)	4 – 5	(Australia) Simon Whitlock 102.94

==== Group F ====
POS	Player	P	W	L	LF	LA	+/-	Pts	Status
1	(Scotland) Gary Anderson (7)	3	3	0	15	6	+9	6	Advance to the last 16
2	(England) Steve Beaton	3	2	1	12	11	+1	4	Advance to the last 16
3	(England) Kevin McDine	3	1	2	11	14	−3	2	Eliminated
4	(Netherlands) Co Stompé	3	0	3	8	15	−7	0	Eliminated

15 November

97.80 Steve Beaton (England)	5 – 2	(Netherlands) Co Stompé 97.06
100.05 Gary Anderson (Scotland)	5 – 2	(England) Kevin McDine 88.99

16 November

103.44 Co Stompé (Netherlands)	4 – 5	(England) Kevin McDine 92.68
82.25 Steve Beaton (England)	2 – 5	(Scotland) Gary Anderson 96.42

18 November

89.73 Co Stompé (Netherlands)	2 – 5	(Scotland) Gary Anderson 99.06
84.02 Kevin McDine (England)	4 – 5	(England) Steve Beaton 84.57

==== Group G ====
POS	Player	P	W	L	LF	LA	+/-	Pts	Status
1	(England) Terry Jenkins (6)	3	2	1	14	9	+5	4	Advance to the last 16
2	(United States) Darin Young (Q)	3	2	1	13	10	+3	4	Advance to the last 16
3	(England) Denis Ovens	3	1	2	9	13	−4	2	Eliminated
4	(England) Adrian Lewis	3	1	2	10	14	−4	2	Eliminated

15 November

91.21 Adrian Lewis (England)	2 – 5	(United States) Darin Young 92.71
103.09 Terry Jenkins (England)	5 – 1	(England) Denis Ovens 91.00

16 November

80.91 Adrian Lewis (England)	3 – 5	(England) Denis Ovens 91.80
84.43 Darin Young (United States)	3 – 5	(England) Terry Jenkins 88.27

18 November

90.58 Terry Jenkins (England)	4 – 5	(England) Adrian Lewis 94.48
90.67 Denis Ovens (England)	3 – 5	(United States) Darin Young 88.34

==== Group H ====
POS	Player	P	W	L	LF	LA	+/-	Pts	Status
1	(Scotland) Robert Thornton	3	2	1	13	9	+4	4	Advance to the last 16
2	(England) Andy Hamilton	3	2	1	12	10	+2	4	Nine-dart shootout
2	(England) James Wade (3)	3	2	1	13	11	+2	4	Nine-dart shootout
4	(United States) Gary Mawson	3	0	3	7	15	−8	0	Eliminated

15 November

79.57 James Wade (England)	5 – 3	(United States) Gary Mawson 82.15
94.88 Robert Thornton (Scotland)	5 – 2	(England) Andy Hamilton 91.63

16 November

87.41 Andy Hamilton (England)	5 – 2	(United States) Gary Mawson 83.92
100.95 Robert Thornton (Scotland)	3 – 5	(England) James Wade 108.90

18 November

103.25 Andy Hamilton (England)	5 – 3	(England) James Wade 102.62
81.95 Gary Mawson (United States)	2 – 5	(Scotland) Robert Thornton 90.13

===== Nine-dart shootout =====
With Andy Hamilton and James Wade finishing level on points and leg difference, a nine-dart shootout between the two took place, to see who would play Terry Jenkins in the second round. The match took place after the conclusion of the group stages. The shootout occurred exactly one year to the day after a similar situation at the 2008 Grand Slam of Darts where Hamilton beat Alan Tabern.

POS	Player	1	2	3	4	5	6	7	8	9	Pts	Status
2	(England) James Wade	20	57	19	5	60	20	60	60	60	361	Advance to the last 16
3	(England) Andy Hamilton	20	20	60	1	57	19	20	60	20	277	Eliminated

=== Knockout stages ===
Second round (best of 19 legs); 19–20 November
A1	(England) Phil Taylor (1) 107.53	10
B2	(England) Colin Lloyd 97.18	4
B1	(England) Tony O'Shea (BDO, 8) 89.68	10
A2	(Wales) Mark Webster 87.08	9
C1	(England) Mervyn King (5) 97.20	6
D2	(Netherlands) Raymond van Barneveld (4) 95.56	10
D1	(England) Kevin Painter 90.44	10
C2	(England) Kirk Shepherd 86.33	5
E1	(Australia) Simon Whitlock 94.98	10
F2	(England) Steve Beaton 84.63	1
F1	(Scotland) Gary Anderson (7) 100.70	9
E2	(England) Scott Waites (BDO) 97.67	10
G1	(England) Terry Jenkins (6) 94.08	10
H2	(England) James Wade (3) 99.53	9
H1	(Scotland) Robert Thornton 88.40	10
G2	(United States) Darin Young (Q) 87.38	9

Quarter-finals (best of 31 legs); 21 November
A1	(England) Phil Taylor (1) 104.34	16
B1	(England) Tony O'Shea (BDO, 8) 95.75	7
D2	(Netherlands) Raymond van Barneveld (4) 98.84	16
D1	(England) Kevin Painter 91.03	6
E1	(Australia) Simon Whitlock 95.75	13
E2	(England) Scott Waites (BDO) 96.72	16
G1	(England) Terry Jenkins (6) 93.66	16
H1	(Scotland) Robert Thornton 93.46	9

Semi-finals (best of 31 legs); 22 November
A1	(England) Phil Taylor (1) 106.11	16
D2	(Netherlands) Raymond van Barneveld (4) 95.21	6
E2	(England) Scott Waites (BDO) 91.87	16
G1	(England) Terry Jenkins (6) 92.02	11

Final (best of 31 legs); 22 November
A1	(England) Phil Taylor (1) 103.94	16
E2	(England) Scott Waites (BDO) 94.16	2

== Statistics ==
Player	Played	Legs Won	Legs Lost	100+	140+	180s	High Checkout	3-dart Average
(England) Phil Taylor	7	69	24	111	87	28	170	104.33
(Scotland) Gary Anderson	4	24	16	47	32	20	140	99.48
(Netherlands) Co Stompé	3	8	15	32	11	4	96	97.12
(England) James Wade	4	22	21	51	30	16	102	97.07
(Australia) Simon Whitlock	5	38	26	81	57	15	146	96.87
(Netherlands) Raymond van Barneveld	6	46	38	95	63	23	161	95.85
(England) Mervyn King	4	20	19	43	40	9	121	94.42
(England) Andy Hamilton	3	12	10	29	11	8	132	93.99
(England) Scott Waites	7	58	57	143	98	24	144	93.92
(Canada) John Part	3	13	12	34	9	5	102	93.40
(England) Darryl Fitton	3	9	14	31	17	7	55	93.32
(England) Terry Jenkins	6	51	43	142	61	22	160	93.05
(England) Tony O'Shea	5	32	32	67	59	21	106	92.97
(Scotland) Robert Thornton	5	32	34	87	51	12	116	92.51
(England) Colin Lloyd	4	14	20	43	26	9	130	92.09
(England) Denis Ovens	3	9	13	27	19	1	120	91.19
(England) Kevin Painter	5	30	29	59	31	20	148	90.83
(Wales) Mark Webster	4	19	20	55	22	6	117	89.79
(England) Kirk Shepherd	4	15	21	46	17	5	145	89.46
(England) Adrian Lewis	3	10	14	17	14	10	91	88.73
(England) Brian Woods	3	8	14	36	13	2	111	88.16
(England) Kevin McDine	3	11	14	32	10	2	170	88.11
(United States) Darin Young	4	22	20	54	24	8	147	87.87
(Netherlands) Vincent van der Voort	3	12	11	27	14	5	74	87.83
(England) Steve Maish	3	12	11	38	16	2	161	86.91
(England) Steve Beaton	4	13	21	44	17	4	121	86.71
(England) Colin Osborne	3	11	13	17	12	7	84	85.90
(Russia) Anastasia Dobromyslova	3	7	14	33	10	3	121	84.54
(England) Wayne Mardle	3	5	15	22	9	3	55	83.80
(England) Ted Hankey	3	12	14	41	15	3	141	83.03
(United States) Gary Mawson	3	7	15	30	13	0	40	82.65
(Netherlands) Francis Hoenselaar	3	4	15	18	11	2	113	76.68
