= 2009 Championship League Darts =

Championship League Darts

Tournament information
- Dates: September 15 – October 22
- Venue: Crondon Park Golf Club
- Location: Stock, Essex
- Country: England
- Organisation(s): PDC
- Format: Legs
- Prize fund: £189,000
- Winner's share: £10,000
- Nine-dart finish: (Netherlands) Jelle Klaasen

Champion(s)
- (England) Colin Osborne

The 2009 Championship League Darts is the second edition of a darts competition—the Championship League Darts. The competition is organized and held by the Professional Darts Corporation and has a maximum prize fund of £189,000.

The format of the tournament is similar to the Premier League Darts tournament, also organized by the PDC, except it is contested by a larger pool of players who are split up into a number of groups.

Every match was watched on one of the ten bookmaker websites who broadcast the competition. The tournament was also available globally through the internet, except in the United States of America where it wasn't shown for legal reasons.

== Format ==
The first group consisted of the top eight players from the PDC Order of Merit who were available for the competition. These eight players played each other over the course of a day and receive points for their performance. A win earned a player two points, unlike 2008 there was no draws. All matches were contested over 11 legs with a player winning the match when the reach 6 legs. When all players have played each other, the four players with the most points progressed to the semi-finals with the winners of those matches progressing into the final.

The winner of the final progressed to the winners group which took place at the end of the competition. The runner-up, losing semi-finalists and the players finishing fifth and sixth moved into group two, where they were joined by the next three players in the Order of Merit. The format of the second group was the same as the first group with players moving into the third group. In total there was 8 groups before the final group took place.

This format ensured that all players who do not win the group or finish in the last two positions had another chance to qualify for the winners group.

== Qualification ==
Players must have been in top 29 places in PDC Order of Merit following 2009 World Matchplay Darts in order to qualify. Thirty places used because of Raymond Van Barneveld withdrawing.

PDC Order of Merit following 2008 World Matchplay Darts.

1. Phil Taylor | 2. James Wade | 3. ~~Raymond van Barneveld~~ | 4. John Part | 5. Terry Jenkins | 6. Mervyn King | 7. Ronnie Baxter | 8. Adrian Lewis | 9. Colin Lloyd | 10. Alan Tabern | 11. Dennis Priestley | 12. Colin Osborne | 13. Wayne Mardle | 14. Mark Walsh | 15. Kevin Painter | 16. Andy Hamilton | 17. Robert Thornton | 18. Vincent van der Voort | 19. Denis Ovens | 20. Peter Manley | 21. Mark Dudbridge | 22. Jelle Klaasen | 23. Wayne Jones | 24. Andy Smith | 25. Roland Scholton | 26. Kirk Shepherd | 27. Co Stompé | 28. Tony Eccles | 29. Michael van Gerwen | 30. Barrie Bates

== Prize money ==
The prize money remained the same as last years tournament.

=== Groups 1–8 ===
In groups 1–8 the prize money were as follows:

Group Matches – £50 per leg won Play-off Matches – £100 per leg won

=== Winners group ===
In the winners group the prize money was as follows:

Group Matches – £100 per leg won Play-off Matches – £200 per leg won In addition the winners group had separate prizes for the winner, runner-up and losing semi-finalists. These prizes broke down as follows:

Winner – £10,000 and a place in the 2009 Grand Slam of Darts Runner-Up – £5,000 and a place in the 2009 Grand Slam of Darts Losing Semi-finalists – £2,500 each

=== Prize money won ===
The following table shows the amount of prize money that has been won by each player.

| Player | Group Legs won | Play-Off Legs won | Winners Group Legs won | Winners Play-Off Legs won | Final position money won* | Total money won |
|---|---|---|---|---|---|---|
| (England) Mervyn King | 100 | 20 | 23 | 1 | £2,500 | £11,900 |
| (England) Phil Taylor | 71 | 22 | 42 | 10 | £5,000 | £17,550 |
| (England) Adrian Lewis | 160 | 6 | 28 | 0 | 0 | £11,400 |
| (England) Alan Tabern | 87 | 4 | 0 | 0 | 0 | £4,750 |
| (England) Colin Lloyd | 114 | 0 | 0 | 0 | 0 | £6,200 |
| (England) Mark Walsh | 108 | 21 | 28 | 0 | 0 | £10,300 |
| (England) James Wade | 41 | 12 | 24 | 2 | £2,500 | £8,550 |
| (Netherlands) Vincent van der Voort | 54 | 8 | 0 | 0 | 0 | £3,500 |
| (England) Colin Osborne | 95 | 10 | 37 | 12 | £10,000 | £21,850 |
| (Scotland) Robert Thornton | 30 | 0 | 0 | 0 | 0 | £1,500 |
| (England) Andy Hamilton | 26 | 0 | 0 | 0 | 0 | £1,300 |
| (England) Dennis Priestley | 24 | 0 | 0 | 0 | 0 | £1,200 |
| (Canada) John Part | 22 | 0 | 0 | 0 | 0 | £1,100 |
| (England) Ronnie Baxter | 21 | 0 | 0 | 0 | 0 | £1,050 |
| (England) Mark Dudbridge | 41 | 3 | 0 | 0 | 0 | £2,350 |
| (England) Wayne Mardle | 36 | 12 | 20 | 0 | 0 | £5,000 |
| (England) Denis Ovens | 64 | 0 | 0 | 0 | 0 | £3,200 |
| (England) Peter Manley | 27 | 0 | 0 | 0 | 0 | £1,350 |
| (England) Kevin Painter | 61 | 10 | 0 | 0 | 0 | £4,050 |
| (England) Terry Jenkins | 79 | 8 | 0 | 0 | 0 | £4,750 |

== Tournament dates ==
The tournament took place over 9 days throughout September and October 2008. One group were played on each day. The dates were as follows:

- Group 1 – Tuesday 15 September 2009
- Group 2 – Wednesday 16 September 2009
- Group 3 – Thursday 17 September 2009
- Group 4 – Tuesday 22 September 2009
- Group 5 – Wednesday 23 September 2009
- Group 6 – Thursday 24 September 2009
- Group 7 – Tuesday 20 October 2009
- Group 8 – Wednesday 21 October 2009
- Winners Group – Thursday 22 October 2009

The tournament took place at the Crondon Park Golf Club in Essex.

== Groups ==
The groups were as follows:

Note: Bold indicates group winner, italics indicate the eliminated players. In groups 1–7, players were eliminated for finishing in the bottom two of the league and in group 8, the players are eliminated for finishing in the bottom four and losing in the semi-finals and the final of the Group 8 playoff. Although in the Winners Group players are out of contention for the title for failing to win outright.

**Group 1**
- (England) Phil Taylor
- **(England) James Wade**
- (Canada) John Part
- (England) Mervyn King
- (England) Ronnie Baxter
- (England) Adrian Lewis
- (England) Colin Lloyd
- (England) Alan Tabern

**Group 2**
- **(England) Phil Taylor**
- (England) Mervyn King
- (England) Adrian Lewis
- (England) Colin Lloyd
- (England) Alan Tabern
- (England) Dennis Priestley
- (England) Mark Walsh
- (England) Andy Hamilton

**Group 3**
- (England) **Mervyn King**
- (England) Adrian Lewis
- (England) Colin Lloyd
- (England) Alan Tabern
- (England) Mark Walsh
- (England) Colin Osborne
- (Scotland) Robert Thornton
- (Netherlands) Vincent van der Voort

**Group 4**
- (England) Adrian Lewis
- (England) Colin Lloyd
- **(England) Mark Walsh**
- (England) Colin Osborne
- (Netherlands) Vincent van der Voort
- (England) Terry Jenkins
- (England) Kevin Painter
- (England) Denis Ovens

**Group 5**
- (England) Adrian Lewis
- (England) Colin Osborne
- (England) Terry Jenkins
- (England) Kevin Painter
- (England) Denis Ovens
- (England) **Wayne Mardle**
- (England) Peter Manley
- (England) Mark Dudbridge

**Group 6**
- (England) Adrian Lewis
- **(England) Colin Osborne**
- (England) Terry Jenkins
- (England) Denis Ovens
- (England) Mark Dudbridge
- (Netherlands) Jelle Klaasen
- (England) Wayne Jones
- (England) Andy Smith

**Group 7**
- (England) Adrian Lewis
- (England) Terry Jenkins
- **(Netherlands) Jelle Klaasen**
- (England) Wayne Jones
- (England) Andy Smith
- (England) Kirk Shepherd
- (Netherlands) Co Stompé
- (England) Tony Eccles

**Group 8**
- **(England) Adrian Lewis**
- (England) Terry Jenkins
- (England) Wayne Jones
- (England) Kirk Shepherd
- (England) Tony Eccles
- (Netherlands) Roland Scholten
- (Netherlands) Michael van Gerwen
- (Wales) Barrie Bates

**Winners Group**
- (England) James Wade
- (England) Phil Taylor
- (England) Mervyn King
- (England) Mark Walsh
- (England) Wayne Mardle
- **(England) Colin Osborne**
- (Netherlands) Jelle Klaasen
- (England) Adrian Lewis

== Results ==
=== Group One ===
Tuesday September 15

| Pos | Name | P | W | L | +/- | Pts |
|---|---|---|---|---|---|---|
| 1 | (England) James Wade | 7 | 6 | 1 | +14 | 12 |
| 2 | (England) Phil Taylor | 7 | 5 | 2 | +14 | 10 |
| 3 | (England) Adrian Lewis | 7 | 5 | 2 | +8 | 10 |
| 4 | (England) Mervyn King | 7 | 5 | 2 | +8 | 10 |
| 5 | (England) Colin Lloyd | 7 | 3 | 4 | +1 | 6 |
| 6 | (England) Alan Tabern | 7 | 2 | 5 | −11 | 4 |
| 7 | (England) Ronnie Baxter | 7 | 1 | 6 | −16 | 2 |
| 8 | (Canada) John Part | 7 | 1 | 6 | −18 | 2 |

==== Group Results ====
| | Score | |
|---|---|---|
| James Wade (England) | 6 – 5 | (England) Phil Taylor |
| Colin Lloyd (England) | 6 – 2 | (England) Alan Tabern |
| Adrian Lewis (England) | 6 – 3 | (England) Ronnie Baxter |
| Mervyn King (England) | 6 – 5 | (Canada) John Part |
| Phil Taylor (England) | 6 – 5 | (England) Alan Tabern |
| John Part (Canada) | 6 – 4 | (England) Adrian Lewis |
| Mervyn King (England) | 6 – 1 | (England) Ronnie Baxter |
| James Wade (England) | 6 – 4 | (England) Colin Lloyd |
| Alan Tabern (England) | 6 – 4 | (Canada) John Part |
| Phil Taylor (England) | 6 – 3 | (England) Adrian Lewis |
| Mervyn King (England) | 6 – 2 | (England) Colin Lloyd |
| James Wade (England) | 6 – 4 | (England) Ronnie Baxter |
| Phil Taylor (England) | 6 – 1 | (Canada) John Part |
| Adrian Lewis (England) | 6 – 2 | (England) Alan Tabern |
| James Wade (England) | 6 – 2 | (England) Mervyn King |
| Colin Lloyd (England) | 6 – 1 | (England) Ronnie Baxter |
| Colin Lloyd (England) | 6 – 4 | (Canada) John Part |
| Phil Taylor (England) | 6 – 1 | (England) Ronnie Baxter |
| Adrian Lewis (England) | 6 – 5 | (England) James Wade |
| Mervyn King (England) | 6 – 2 | (England) Alan Tabern |
| Alan Tabern (England) | 6 – 5 | (England) Ronnie Baxter |
| James Wade (England) | 6 – 1 | (Canada) John Part |
| Adrian Lewis (England) | 6 – 5 | (England) Colin Lloyd |
| Mervyn King (England) | 6 – 4 | (England) Phil Taylor |
| Phil Taylor (England) | 6 – 3 | (England) Colin Lloyd |
| Ronnie Baxter (England) | 6 – 1 | (Canada) John Part |
| Adrian Lewis (England) | 6 – 2 | (England) Mervyn King |
| James Wade (England) | 6 – 5 | (England) Alan Tabern |

==== Play-Offs ====
| | Score | |
|---|---|---|
Semi-finals
| (1) James Wade (England) | 6 – 5 | (England) Mervyn King (4) |
| (2) Phil Taylor (England) | 6 – 3 | (England) Adrian Lewis (3) |
Final
| (1) James Wade (England) | 6 – 4 | (England) Phil Taylor (2) |

=== Group Two ===
Wednesday September 16

| Pos | Name | P | W | L | +/- | Pts |
|---|---|---|---|---|---|---|
| 1 | (England) Phil Taylor | 7 | 7 | 0 | +29 | 14 |
| 2 | (England) Mark Walsh | 7 | 4 | 3 | +4 | 8 |
| 3 | (England) Alan Tabern | 7 | 4 | 3 | +1 | 8 |
| 4 | (England) Mervyn King | 7 | 4 | 3 | +1 | 8 |
| 5 | (England) Adrian Lewis | 7 | 3 | 4 | −7 | 6 |
| 6 | (England) Colin Lloyd | 7 | 2 | 5 | −8 | 4 |
| 7 | (England) Andy Hamilton | 7 | 2 | 5 | −9 | 4 |
| 8 | (England) Dennis Priestley | 7 | 2 | 5 | −11 | 2 |

==== Group Results ====
| | Score | |
|---|---|---|
| Phil Taylor (England) | 6 – 2 | (England) Mervyn King |
| Mark Walsh (England) | 6 – 1 | (England) Andy Hamilton |
| Alan Tabern (England) | 6 – 3 | (England) Dennis Priestley |
| Adrian Lewis (England) | 6 – 5 | (England) Colin Lloyd |
| Phil Taylor (England) | 6 – 5 | (England) Andy Hamilton |
| Dennis Priestley (England) | 6 – 2 | (England) Adrian Lewis |
| Alan Tabern (England) | 6 – 4 | (England) Colin Lloyd |
| Mervyn King (England) | 6 – 5 | (England) Mark Walsh |
| Adrian Lewis (England) | 6 – 5 | (England) Andy Hamilton |
| Phil Taylor (England) | 6 – 2 | (England) Dennis Priestley |
| Mark Walsh (England) | 6 – 5 | (England) Colin Lloyd |
| Alan Tabern (England) | 6 – 1 | (England) Mervyn King |
| Phil Taylor (England) | 6 – 0 | (England) Adrian Lewis |
| Dennis Priestley (England) | 6 – 3 | (England) Andy Hamilton |
| Colin Lloyd (England) | 6 – 5 | (England) Mervyn King |
| Mark Walsh (England) | 6 – 2 | (England) Alan Tabern |
| Adrian Lewis (England) | 6 – 3 | (England) Mark Walsh |
| Phil Taylor (England) | 6 – 3 | (England) Alan Tabern |
| Mervyn King (England) | 6 – 3 | (England) Dennis Priestley |
| Andy Hamilton (England) | 6 – 2 | (England) Colin Lloyd |
| Andy Hamilton (England) | 6 – 3 | (England) Alan Tabern |
| Mervyn King (England) | 6 – 5 | (England) Adrian Lewis |
| Mark Walsh (England) | 6 – 3 | (England) Dennis Priestley |
| Phil Taylor (England) | 6 – 0 | (England) Colin Lloyd |
| Phil Taylor (England) | 6 – 1 | (England) Mark Walsh |
| Alan Tabern (England) | 6 – 5 | (England) Adrian Lewis |
| Colin Lloyd (England) | 6 – 1 | (England) Dennis Priestley |
| Mervyn King (England) | 6 – 0 | (England) Andy Hamilton |

==== Play-Offs ====
| | Score | |
|---|---|---|
Semi-finals
| (1) Phil Taylor (England) | 6 – 3 | (England) Mervyn King (4) |
| (2) Mark Walsh (England) | 6 – 4 | (England) Alan Tabern (3) |
Final
| (1) Phil Taylor (England) | 6 – 0 | (England) Mark Walsh (2) |

=== Group Three ===
Thursday September 17

| Pos | Name | P | W | L | +/- | Pts |
|---|---|---|---|---|---|---|
| 1 | (England) Mark Walsh | 7 | 6 | 1 | +11 | 12 |
| 2 | (England) Mervyn King | 7 | 4 | 3 | +9 | 8 |
| 3 | (England) Colin Osborne | 7 | 4 | 3 | +1 | 8 |
| 4 | (Netherlands) Vincent van der Voort | 7 | 4 | 3 | −2 | 8 |
| 5 | (England) Colin Lloyd | 7 | 3 | 4 | +3 | 6 |
| 6 | (England) Adrian Lewis | 7 | 3 | 4 | −2 | 6 |
| 7 | (Scotland) Robert Thornton | 7 | 3 | 4 | −6 | 6 |
| 8 | (England) Alan Tabern | 7 | 1 | 6 | −14 | 2 |

==== Group Results ====
| | Score | |
|---|---|---|
| Adrian Lewis (England) | 6 – 3 | (England) Mervyn King |
| Vincent van der Voort (Netherlands) | 6 – 4 | (Scotland) Robert Thornton |
| Mark Walsh (England) | 6 – 3 | (England) Colin Osborne |
| Colin Lloyd (England) | 6 – 3 | (England) Alan Tabern |
| Mervyn King (England) | 6 – 1 | (Netherlands) Vincent van der Voort |
| Mark Walsh (England) | 6 – 3 | (England) Colin Lloyd |
| Colin Osborne (England) | 6 – 2 | (Scotland) Robert Thornton |
| Robert Thornton (Scotland) | 6 – 4 | (England) Adrian Lewis |
| Vincent van der Voort (Netherlands) | 6 – 4 | (England) Colin Lloyd |
| Mark Walsh (England) | 6 – 4 | (England) Colin Lloyd |
| Robert Thornton (Scotland) | 6 – 5 | (England) Alan Tabern |
| Colin Osborne (England) | 6 – 4 | (England) Adrian Lewis |
| Mervyn King (England) | 6 – 4 | (England) Colin Lloyd |
| Mark Walsh (England) | 6 – 4 | (Netherlands) Vincent van der Voort |
| Alan Tabern (England) | 6 – 5 | (England) Adrian Lewis |
| Colin Osborne (England) | 6 – 3 | (Scotland) Robert Thornton |
| Robert Thornton (Scotland) | 6 – 3 | (England) Colin Lloyd |
| Colin Osborne (England) | 6 – 5 | (England) Mervyn King |
| Adrian Lewis (England) | 6 – 2 | (England) Mark Walsh |
| Vincent van der Voort (Netherlands) | 6 – 5 | (England) Alan Tabern |
| Vincent van der Voort (Netherlands) | 6 – 5 | (England) Colin Osborne |
| Colin Lloyd (England) | 6 – 1 | (England) Adrian Lewis |
| Mark Walsh (England) | 6 – 5 | (Scotland) Robert Thornton |
| Mervyn King (England) | 6 – 2 | (England) Alan Tabern |
| Mervyn King (England) | 6 – 0 | (Scotland) Robert Thornton |
| Colin Lloyd (England) | 6 – 1 | (England) Colin Osborne |
| Mark Walsh (England) | 6 – 4 | (England) Alan Tabern |
| Adrian Lewis (England) | 6 – 5 | (Netherlands) Vincent van der Voort |

==== Play-Offs ====
| | Score | |
|---|---|---|
Semi-finals
| (1) Mark Walsh (England) | 3 – 6 | (Netherlands) Vincent van der Voort (4) |
| (2) Mervyn King (England) | 6 – 1 | (England) Colin Osborne (3) |
Final
| (4) Vincent van der Voort (Netherlands) | 2 – 6 | (England) Mervyn King (2) |

=== Group Four ===
Tuesday September 22

| Pos | Name | P | W | L | +/- | Pts |
|---|---|---|---|---|---|---|
| 1 | (England) Terry Jenkins | 7 | 7 | 0 | +24 | 14 |
| 2 | (England) Kevin Painter | 7 | 5 | 2 | +12 | 10 |
| 3 | (England) Adrian Lewis | 7 | 4 | 3 | +7 | 8 |
| 4 | (England) Mark Walsh | 7 | 4 | 3 | +4 | 8 |
| 5 | (England) Colin Osborne | 7 | 3 | 4 | −1 | 6 |
| 6 | (England) Denis Ovens | 7 | 3 | 4 | −3 | 6 |
| 7 | (England) Colin Lloyd | 7 | 1 | 6 | −16 | 2 |
| 8 | (Netherlands) Vincent van der Voort | 7 | 1 | 6 | −21 | 2 |

==== Group Results ====
| | Score | |
|---|---|---|
| Terry Jenkins (England) | 6 – 4 | (England) Adrian Lewis |
| Denis Ovens (England) | 6 – 2 | (Netherlands) Vincent van der Voort |
| Mark Walsh (England) | 6 – 4 | (England) Kevin Painter |
| Colin Osborne (England) | 6 – 2 | (England) Colin Lloyd |
| Terry Jenkins (England) | 6 – 3 | (England) Denis Ovens |
| Kevin Painter (England) | 6 – 1 | (England) Colin Lloyd |
| Mark Walsh (England) | 6 – 4 | (England) Colin Osborne |
| Adrian Lewis (England) | 6 – 0 | (Netherlands) Vincent van der Voort |
| Denis Ovens (England) | 6 – 3 | (England) Colin Lloyd |
| Terry Jenkins (England) | 6 – 5 | (England) Kevin Painter |
| Colin Osborne (England) | 6 – 3 | (Netherlands) Vincent van der Voort |
| Adrian Lewis (England) | 6 – 3 | (England) Mark Walsh |
| Terry Jenkins (England) | 6 – 2 | (England) Colin Lloyd |
| Kevin Painter (England) | 6 – 4 | (England) Denis Ovens |
| Adrian Lewis (England) | 6 – 5 | (England) Colin Osborne |
| Mark Walsh (England) | 6 – 4 | (Netherlands) Vincent van der Voort |
| Vincent van der Voort (Netherlands) | 6 – 5 | (England) Colin Lloyd |
| Terry Jenkins (England) | 6 – 5 | (England) Mark Walsh |
| Kevin Painter (England) | 6 – 5 | (England) Adrian Lewis |
| Colin Osborne (England) | 6 – 4 | (England) Denis Ovens |
| Denis Ovens (England) | 6 – 5 | (England) Mark Walsh |
| Colin Lloyd (England) | 6 – 2 | (England) Adrian Lewis |
| Kevin Painter (England) | 6 – 1 | (Netherlands) Vincent van der Voort |
| Terry Jenkins (England) | 6 – 4 | (England) Colin Osborne |
| Terry Jenkins (England) | 6 – 4 | (Netherlands) Vincent van der Voort |
| Mark Walsh (England) | 6 – 3 | (England) Colin Lloyd |
| Kevin Painter (England) | 6 – 4 | (England) Colin Osborne |
| Adrian Lewis (England) | 6 – 2 | (England) Denis Ovens |

==== Play-Offs ====
| | Score | |
|---|---|---|
Semi-finals
| (1) Terry Jenkins (England) | 3 – 6 | (England) Mark Walsh (4) |
| (2) Kevin Painter (England) | 6 – 3 | (England) Adrian Lewis (3) |
Final
| (4) Mark Walsh (England) | 6 – 4 | (England) Kevin Painter (2) |

=== Group Five ===
Wednesday September 23

| Pos | Name | P | W | L | +/- | Pts |
|---|---|---|---|---|---|---|
| 1 | (England) Mark Dudbridge | 7 | 6 | 1 | +18 | 12 |
| 2 | (England) Wayne Mardle | 7 | 5 | 2 | +4 | 10 |
| 3 | (England) Terry Jenkins | 7 | 4 | 3 | +5 | 8 |
| 4 | (England) Colin Osborne | 7 | 4 | 3 | +4 | 8 |
| 5 | (England) Denis Ovens | 7 | 4 | 3 | −1 | 8 |
| 6 | (England) Adrian Lewis | 7 | 3 | 4 | +1 | 6 |
| 7 | (England) Peter Manley | 7 | 2 | 5 | −11 | 4 |
| 8 | (England) Kevin Painter | 7 | 0 | 7 | −20 | 0 |

==== Group Results ====
| | Score | |
|---|---|---|
| Adrian Lewis (England) | 6 – 4 | (England) Terry Jenkins |
| Mark Dudbridge (England) | 6 – 2 | (England) Peter Manley |
| Denis Ovens (England) | 6 – 5 | (England) Kevin Painter |
| Colin Osborne (England) | 6 – 2 | (England) Wayne Mardle |
| Mark Dudbridge (England) | 6 – 5 | (England) Terry Jenkins |
| Colin Osborne (England) | 6 – 1 | (England) Denis Ovens |
| Wayne Mardle (England) | 6 – 1 | (England) Kevin Painter |
| Peter Manley (England) | 6 – 4 | (England) Adrian Lewis |
| Mark Dudbridge (England) | 6 – 2 | (England) Colin Osborne |
| Terry Jenkins (England) | 6 – 5 | (England) Denis Ovens |
| Wayne Mardle (England) | 6 – 5 | (England) Peter Manley |
| Adrian Lewis (England) | 6 – 4 | (England) Kevin Painter |
| Terry Jenkins (England) | 6 – 1 | (England) Colin Osborne |
| Mark Dudbridge (England) | 6 – 3 | (England) Denis Ovens |
| Wayne Mardle (England) | 6 – 5 | (England) Adrian Lewis |
| Peter Manley (England) | 6 – 4 | (England) Kevin Painter |
| Colin Osborne (England) | 6 – 2 | (England) Peter Manley |
| Terry Jenkins (England) | 6 – 5 | (England) Kevin Painter |
| Denis Ovens (England) | 6 – 4 | (England) Adrian Lewis |
| Wayne Mardle (England) | 6 – 5 | (England) Mark Dudbridge |
| Mark Dudbridge (England) | 6 – 0 | (England) Kevin Painter |
| Adrian Lewis (England) | 6 – 3 | (England) Colin Osborne |
| Denis Ovens (England) | 6 – 3 | (England) Peter Manley |
| Wayne Mardle (England) | 6 – 4 | (England) Terry Jenkins |
| Terry Jenkins (England) | 6 – 3 | (England) Peter Manley |
| Colin Osborne (England) | 6 – 3 | (England) Kevin Painter |
| Denis Ovens (England) | 6 – 4 | (England) Wayne Mardle |
| Mark Dudbridge (England) | 6 – 5 | (England) Adrian Lewis |

==== Play-Offs ====
| | Score | |
|---|---|---|
Semi-finals
| (1) Mark Dudbridge (England) | 3 – 6 | (England) Colin Osborne (4) |
| (2) Wayne Mardle (England) | 6 – 5 | (England) Terry Jenkins (3) |
Final
| (4) Colin Osborne (England) | 3 – 6 | (England) Wayne Mardle (2) |

=== Group Six ===
Thursday September 24

| Pos | Name | P | W | L | +/- | Pts |
|---|---|---|---|---|---|---|
| 1 | (Netherlands) Jelle Klaasen | 7 | 5 | 2 | +13 | 10 |
| 2 | (England) Colin Osborne | 7 | 5 | 2 | +9 | 10 |
| 3 | (England) Wayne Jones | 7 | 5 | 2 | +6 | 10 |
| 4 | (England) Adrian Lewis | 7 | 4 | 3 | +8 | 8 |
| 5 | (England) Terry Jenkins | 7 | 4 | 3 | +6 | 8 |
| 6 | (England) Andy Smith | 7 | 3 | 4 | −11 | 6 |
| 7 | (England) Denis Ovens | 7 | 1 | 6 | −13 | 2 |
| 8 | (England) Mark Dudbridge | 7 | 1 | 6 | −18 | 2 |

==== Group Results ====
| | Score | |
|---|---|---|
| Terry Jenkins (England) | 5 – 6 | (England) Adrian Lewis |
| Wayne Jones (England) | 5 – 6 | (England) Andy Smith |
| Mark Dudbridge (England) | 2 – 6 | (Netherlands) Jelle Klaasen |
| Colin Osborne (England) | 6 – 3 | (England) Denis Ovens |
| Andy Smith (England) | 5 – 6 | (England) Terry Jenkins |
| Jelle Klaasen (Netherlands) | 3 – 6 | (England) Colin Osborne |
| Denis Ovens (England) | 6 – 5 | (England) Mark Dudbridge |
| Adrian Lewis (England) | 3 – 6 | (England) Wayne Jones |
| Andy Smith (England) | 2 – 6 | (England) Colin Osborne |
| Terry Jenkins (England) | 6 – 4 | (Netherlands) Jelle Klaasen |
| Denis Ovens (England) | 5 – 6 | (England) Wayne Jones |
| Adrian Lewis (England) | 5 – 6 | (England) Mark Dudbridge |
| Colin Osborne (England) | 6 – 5 | (England) Terry Jenkins |
| Andy Smith (England) | 1 – 6 | (Netherlands) Jelle Klaasen |
| Adrian Lewis (England) | 6 – 3 | (England) Denis Ovens |
| Wayne Jones (England) | 6 – 5 | (England) Mark Dudbridge |
| Wayne Jones (England) | 6 – 4 | (England) Colin Osborne |
| Mark Dudbridge (England) | 1 – 6 | (England) Terry Jenkins |
| Jelle Klaasen (Netherlands) | 6 – 3 | (England) Adrian Lewis |
| Denis Ovens (England) | 5 – 6 | (England) Andy Smith |
| Mark Dudbridge (England) | 3 – 6 | (England) Andy Smith |
| Adrian Lewis (England) | 6 – 1 | (England) Colin Osborne |
| Jelle Klaasen (Netherlands) | 6 – 5 | (England) Wayne Jones |
| Terry Jenkins (England) | 6 – 5 | (England) Denis Ovens |
| Wayne Jones (England) | 6 – 5 | (England) Terry Jenkins |
| Colin Osborne (England) | 6 – 1 | (England) Mark Dudbridge |
| Denis Ovens (England) | 1 – 6 | (Netherlands) Jelle Klaasen |
| Andy Smith (England) | 0 – 6 | (England) Adrian Lewis |

==== Play-Offs ====
| | Score | |
|---|---|---|
Semi-finals
| (1) Jelle Klaasen (Netherlands) | 6 – 5 | (England) Adrian Lewis (4) |
| (2) Colin Osborne (England) | 6 – 4 | (England) Wayne Jones (3) |
Final
| (1) Jelle Klaasen (Netherlands) | 3 – 6 | (England) Colin Osborne (2) |

=== Group Seven ===
Tuesday October 20

| Pos | Name | P | W | L | +/- | Pts |
|---|---|---|---|---|---|---|
| 1 | (England) Adrian Lewis | 7 | 4 | 3 | +8 | 8 |
| 2 | (England) Kirk Shepherd | 7 | 4 | 3 | +4 | 8 |
| 3 | (England) Wayne Jones | 7 | 4 | 3 | −1 | 8 |
| 4 | (Netherlands) Jelle Klaasen | 7 | 4 | 3 | −2 | 8 |
| 5 | (England) Tony Eccles | 7 | 4 | 3 | −2 | 8 |
| 6 | (England) Terry Jenkins | 7 | 3 | 4 | 0 | 6 |
| 7 | (England) Andy Smith | 7 | 3 | 4 | −1 | 6 |
| 8 | (Netherlands) Co Stompé | 7 | 2 | 5 | −6 | 4 |

==== Group Results ====
| | Score | |
|---|---|---|
| Terry Jenkins (England) | 1 – 6 | (England) Adrian Lewis |
| Co Stompé (Netherlands) | 4 – 6 | (England) Tony Eccles |
| Andy Smith (England) | 3 – 6 | (England) Kirk Shepherd |
| Jelle Klaasen (Netherlands) | 6 – 4 | (England) Wayne Jones |
| Tony Eccles (England) | 2 – 6 | (England) Terry Jenkins |
| Kirk Shepherd (England) | 6 – 3 | (Netherlands) Jelle Klaasen |
| Wayne Jones (England) | 6 – 4 | (England) Andy Smith |
| Adrian Lewis (England) | 6 – 4 | (Netherlands) Co Stompé |
| Tony Eccles (England) | 3 – 6 | (Netherlands) Jelle Klaasen |
| Terry Jenkins (England) | 5 – 6 | (England) Kirk Shepherd |
| Wayne Jones (England) | 6 – 4 | (Netherlands) Co Stompé |
| Adrian Lewis (England) | 6 – 3 | (England) Andy Smith |
| Jelle Klaasen (Netherlands) | 2 – 6 | (England) Terry Jenkins |
| Tony Eccles (England) | 6 – 3 | (England) Kirk Shepherd |
| Adrian Lewis (England) | 6 – 4 | (England) Wayne Jones |
| Co Stompé (Netherlands) | 1 – 6 | (England) Andy Smith |
| Co Stompé (Netherlands) | 5 – 6 | (Netherlands) Jelle Klaasen |
| Anndy Smith (England) | 6 – 5 | (England) Terry Jenkins |
| Kirk Shepherd (England) | 6 – 4 | (England) Adrian Lewis |
| Wayne Jones (England) | 6 – 4 | (England) Tony Eccles |
| Andy Smith (England) | 5 – 6 | (England) Tony Eccles |
| Adrian Lewis (England) | 5 – 6 | (Netherlands) Jelle Klaasen |
| Kirk Shepherd (England) | 5 – 6 | (Netherlands) Co Stompé |
| Terry Jenkins (England) | 6 – 2 | (England) Wayne Jones |
| Co Stompé (Netherlands) | 6 – 1 | (England) Terry Jenkins |
| Jelle Klaasen (Netherlands) | 4 – 6 | (England) Andy Smith |
| Wayne Jones (England) | 6 – 5 | (England) Kirk Shepherd |
| Tony Eccles (England) | 6 – 5 | (England) Adrian Lewis |

==== Play-Offs ====
| | Score | |
|---|---|---|
Semi-finals
| (1) Adrian Lewis (England) | 5 – 6 | (Netherlands) Jelle Klaasen (4) |
| (2) Kirk Shepherd (England) | 6 – 5 | (England) Wayne Jones (3) |
Final
| (4) Jelle Klaasen (Netherlands) | 6 – 1 | (England) Kirk Shepherd (2) |

=== Group Eight ===
Wednesday October 21

| Pos | Name | P | W | L | +/- | Pts |
|---|---|---|---|---|---|---|
| 1 | (England) Adrian Lewis | 7 | 5 | 2 | +9 | 10 |
| 2 | (Netherlands) Michael van Gerwen | 7 | 4 | 3 | +8 | 8 |
| 3 | (Wales) Barrie Bates | 7 | 4 | 3 | +4 | 8 |
| 4 | (England) Kirk Shepherd | 7 | 4 | 3 | +4 | 8 |
| 5 | (England) Tony Eccles | 7 | 4 | 3 | +3 | 8 |
| 6 | (England) Wayne Jones | 7 | 4 | 3 | +1 | 8 |
| 7 | (England) Terry Jenkins | 7 | 2 | 5 | −12 | 4 |
| 8 | (Netherlands) Roland Scholten | 7 | 1 | 6 | −17 | 2 |

==== Group Results ====
| | Score | |
|---|---|---|
| Terry Jenkins (England) | 6 – 5 | (England) Adrian Lewis |
| Michael van Gerwen (Netherlands) | 6 – 4 | (Wales) Barrie Bates |
| Tony Eccles (England) | 6 – 4 | (Netherlands) Roland Scholten |
| Wayne Jones (England) | 6 – 3 | (England) Kirk Shepherd |
| Barrie Bates (Wales) | 6 – 5 | (England) Terry Jenkins |
| Roland Scholten (Netherlands) | 1 – 6 | (England) Wayne Jones |
| Tony Eccles (England) | 6 – 3 | (England) Kirk Shepherd |
| Adrian Lewis (England) | 6 – 4 | (Netherlands) Michael van Gerwen |
| Barrie Bates (Wales) | 6 – 2 | (England) Wayne Jones |
| Terry Jenkins (England) | 6 – 1 | (Netherlands) Roland Scholten |
| Kirk Shepherd (England) | 3 – 6 | (Netherlands) Michael van Gerwen |
| Adrian Lewis (England) | 6 – 5 | (England) Tony Eccles |
| Wayne Jones (England) | 6 – 2 | (England) Terry Jenkins |
| Barrie Bates (Wales) | 6 – 3 | (Netherlands) Roland Scholten |
| Adrian Lewis (England) | 4 – 6 | (England) Kirk Shepherd |
| Michael van Gerwen (Netherlands) | 6 – 5 | (England) Tony Eccles |
| Michael van Gerwen (Netherlands) | 5 – 6 | (England) Wayne Jones |
| Tony Eccles (England) | 6 – 5 | (England) Terry Jenkins |
| Roland Scholten (Netherlands) | 5 – 6 | (England) Adrian Lewis |
| Kirk Shepherd (England) | 6 – 3 | (Wales) Barrie Bates |
| Tony Eccles (England) | 1 – 6 | (Wales) Barrie Bates |
| Adrian Lewis (England) | 6 – 2 | (England) Wayne Jones |
| Roland Scholten (Netherlands) | 6 – 5 | (Netherlands) Michael van Gerwen |
| Terry Jenkins (England) | 0 – 6 | (England) Kirk Shepherd |
| Michael van Gerwen (Netherlands) | 6 – 0 | (England) Terry Jenkins |
| Wayne Jones (England) | 2 – 6 | (England) Tony Eccles |
| Kirk Shepherd (England) | 6 – 4 | (Netherlands) Roland Scholten |
| Barrie Bates (Wales) | 2 – 6 | (England) Adrian Lewis |

==== Play-Offs ====
| | Score | |
|---|---|---|
Semi-finals
| (1) Adrian Lewis (England) | 6 – 1 | (England) Kirk Shepherd (4) |
| (2) Michael van Gerwen (Netherlands) | 6 – 4 | (Wales) Barrie Bates (3) |
Final
| (1) Adrian Lewis (England) | 6 – 4 | (Netherlands) Michael van Gerwen (2) |

=== Winners Group ===
Thursday October 22

| Pos | Name | P | W | L | +/- | Pts |
|---|---|---|---|---|---|---|
| 1 | (England) Phil Taylor | 7 | 7 | 0 | +31 | 14 |
| 2 | (England) Colin Osborne | 7 | 5 | 2 | +13 | 10 |
| 3 | (England) Mervyn King | 7 | 4 | 3 | +1 | 8 |
| 4 | (England) James Wade | 7 | 4 | 3 | −1 | 8 |
| 5 | (England) Adrian Lewis | 7 | 4 | 3 | −5 | 8 |
| 6 | (England) Mark Walsh | 7 | 2 | 5 | −6 | 4 |
| 7 | (Netherlands) Jelle Klaasen | 7 | 1 | 6 | −13 | 2 |
| 8 | (England) Wayne Mardle | 7 | 1 | 6 | −20 | 2 |

==== Group Results ====
| | Score | |
|---|---|---|
| James Wade (England) | 1 – 6 | (England) Phil Taylor |
| Jelle Klaasen (Netherlands) | 5 – 6 | (England) Adrian Lewis |
| Wayne Mardle (England) | 1 – 6 | (England) Colin Osborne |
| Mervynn King (England) | 6 – 4 | (England) Mark Walsh |
| Adrian Lewis (England) | 6 – 4 | (England) James Wade |
| Colin Osborne (England) | 5 – 6 | (England) Mervyn King |
| Mark Walsh (England) | 6 – 0 | (England) Wayne Mardle |
| Phil Taylor (England) | 6 – 4 | (Netherlands) Jelle Klaasen |
| Adrian Lewis (England) | 1 – 6 | (England) Mervyn King |
| James Wade (England) | 5 – 6 | (England) Colin Osborne |
| Mark Walsh (England) | 6 – 4 | (Netherlands) Jelle Klaasen |
| Phil Taylor (England) | 6 – 2 | (England) Wayne Mardle |
| Mervyn King (England) | 5 – 6 | (England) James Wade |
| Adrian Lewis (England) | 2 – 6 | (England) Colin Osborne |
| Phil Taylor (England) | 6 – 1 | (England) Mark Walsh |
| Jelle Klaasen (Netherlands) | 6 – 5 | (England) Wayne Mardle |
| Jelle Klaasen (Netherlands) | 4 – 6 | (England) Mervyn King |
| Wayne Mardle (England) | 4 – 6 | (England) James Wade |
| Colin Osborne (England) | 2 – 6 | (England) Phil Taylor |
| Mark Walsh (England) | 4 – 6 | (England) Adrian Lewis |
| Wayne Mardle (England) | 2 – 6 | (England) Adrian Lewis |
| Phil Taylor (England) | 6 – 0 | (England) Mervyn King |
| Colin Osborne (England) | 6 – 2 | (Netherlands) Jelle Klaasen |
| James Wade (England) | 6 – 5 | (England) Mark Walsh |
| Jelle Klaasen (Netherlands) | 3 – 6 | (England) James Wade |
| Mervyn King (England) | 4 – 6 | (England) Wayne Mardle |
| Mark Walsh (England) | 2 – 6 | (England) Colin Osborne |
| Adrian Lewis (England) | 1 – 6 | (England) Phil Taylor |

==== Play-Offs ====
| | Score | |
|---|---|---|
Semi-finals
| (1) Phil Taylor (England) | 6 – 2 | (England) James Wade (4) |
| (2) Colin Osborne (England) | 6 – 1 | (England) Mervyn King (3) |
Final
| (2) Colin Osborne (England) | 6 – 4 | (England) Phil Taylor (1) |
