= 2009 Grand Slam of Darts ITV Wildcard Qualifier =

Darts tournament

Tournament information
- Dates: 6 November 2009
- Venue: Magnum Centre
- Location: Irvine
- Country: Scotland
- Organisation(s): PDC
- Format: Legs

Champion(s)
- (England) Steve Maish

The 2009 Grand Slam of Darts ITV Wildcard Qualifier was the qualifying event for the 2009 Grand Slam of Darts which was held at the Magnum Centre in Irvine on 6 November 2009. 21st seed Steve Maish won the event after beating unseeded Arron Monk 5-3 in the final.

== Seeds ==
1. (England) Ronnie Baxter
2. (England) Dennis Priestley
3. (England) Mark Walsh
4. (England) Alan Tabern
5. (England) Peter Manley
6. (England) Mark Dudbridge
7. (England) Wayne Jones
8. (Netherlands) Jelle Klaasen
9. (England) Jamie Caven
10. (England) Andy Smith
11. (England) Wes Newton
12. (England) Tony Eccles
13. (Netherlands) Michael van Gerwen
14. (Netherlands) Roland Scholten
15. (Wales) Barrie Bates
16. (England) Andy Jenkins
17. (England) Alex Roy
18. (Australia) Paul Nicholson
19. (England) Matt Clark
20. (England) Adrian Gray
21. (England) Steve Maish
22. (Republic of Ireland) Jacko Barry
23. (Netherlands) Jan van der Rassel
24. (Northern Ireland) Brendan Dolan
25. (Republic of Ireland) Mick McGowan
26. (England) Dennis Smith
27. (Northern Ireland) John Magowan
28. (England) Colin Monk
29. (England) Steve Hine
30. (England) Peter Wright
31. (England) Steve Brown
32. (England) Mark Frost

== Draw ==
Round 2
1	(England) Ronnie Baxter	4
(England) Jamie Atkins	3
32	(England) Mark Frost	3
(England) Anthony Urmston-Toft	4
16	(England) Andy Jenkins	4
(Republic of Ireland) Billy Meakins	1
17	(England) Alex Roy	1
(England) Tony Martin	4
8	(Netherlands) Jelle Klaasen	3
(England) Sean White	4
25	(Republic of Ireland) Mick McGowan	1
(England) Danny Pinhorne	4
9	(England) Jamie Caven	4
(England) Justin Pipe	3
(Scotland) Ian Gunion Jnr	0
(England) Matt Draper	4
5	(England) Peter Manley	4
(England) Michael Barnard	2
28	(England) Colin Monk	4
(England) Martyn Turner	1
12	(England) Tony Eccles	4
(England) Darren Johnson	0
21	(England) Steve Maish	4
(Northern Ireland) Geoff Wylie	1
4	(England) Alan Tabern	4
(Northern Ireland) Ray Farrell	0
29	(England) Steve Hines	3
(England) Simon Burt	4
(England) John Quantock	2
(England) Steve Grubb	4
(England) Louis Blundell	3
(Netherlands) Bryan de Hoog	4
2	(England) Dennis Priestley	4
(England) Steve Musson	2
31	(England) Steve Brown	3
(Scotland) Don Haughton	4
15	(Wales) Barrie Bates	3
(England) Mark Jodrill	4
(England) Sam Allen	4
(England) Alex Tinsley	2
7	(England) Wayne Jones	4
(England) Rick Lowther	3
26	(England) Dennis Smith	4
(Wales) Steve Evans	2
10	(England) Andy Smith	4
(England) James Barton	3
23	(Netherlands) Jan van der Rassel	4
(England) Mark Carter	2
(England) Andy Boulton	4
(England) Lionel Sams	2
27	(Northern Ireland) John Magowan	4
(England) Dave Ahmet	0
(England) Arron Monk	4
(England) Paul Williams	1
(England) Michael Smith	1
(Wales) Wayne Atwood	4
3	(England) Mark Walsh	4
(Scotland) Drew Callary	2
30	(England) Peter Wright	3
(Scotland) Mike Veitch	4
(Scotland) David Brown	4
(Scotland) John Murdoch	2
19	(England) Matt Clark	4
(England) Ian Jones	2

Round 3
1	(England) Ronnie Baxter	4
(England) Anthony Urmston-Toft	2
16	(England) Andy Jenkins	4
(England) Tony Martin	1
(England) Sean White	2
(England) Danny Pinhorne	4
9	(England) Jamie Caven	4
(England) Matt Draper	0
5	(England) Peter Manley	4
28	(England) Colin Monk	0
12	(England) Tony Eccles	2
21	(England) Steve Maish	4
4	(England) Alan Tabern	4
(England) Simon Burt	0
(England) Steve Grubb	4
(Netherlands) Bryan de Hoog	2
2	(England) Dennis Priestley	4
(Scotland) Don Haughton	3
(England) Mark Jodrill	4
(England) Sam Allen	1
7	(England) Wayne Jones	4
26	(England) Dennis Smith	3
10	(England) Andy Smith	2
23	(Netherlands) Jan van der Rassel	4
(England) Andy Boulton	4
27	(Northern Ireland) John Magowan	1
(England) Arron Monk	4
(Wales) Wayne Atwood	3
3	(England) Mark Walsh	2
(Scotland) Mike Veitch	4
(Scotland) David Brown	1
19	(England) Matt Clark	4

Round 4
1	(England) Ronnie Baxter	4
16	(England) Andy Jenkins	3
(England) Danny Pinhorne	0
9	(England) Jamie Caven	4
5	(England) Peter Manley	2
21	(England) Steve Maish	4
4	(England) Alan Tabern	4
(England) Steve Grubb	2
2	(England) Dennis Priestley	2
(England) Mark Jordill	4
7	(England) Wayne Jones	4
23	(Netherlands) Jan van der Rassel	0
(England) Andy Boulton	2
(England) Arron Monk	4
(Scotland) Mike Veitch	1
19	(England) Matt Clark	4

Quarter-finals
1	(England) Ronnie Baxter	4
9	(England) Jamie Caven	3
21	(England) Steve Maish	4
4	(England) Alan Tabern	2
(England) Mark Jordill	0
7	(England) Wayne Jones	4
(England) Arron Monk	4
19	(England) Matt Clark	2

Semi-finals
1	(England) Ronnie Baxter	2
21	(England) Steve Maish	4
7	(England) Wayne Jones	3
(England) Arron Monk	4

Final
21	(England) Steve Maish	5
(England) Arron Monk	3

== 2009 Grand Slam of Darts ==
Steve Maish was placed in Pool Three and draw in Group C along with 2009 Premier League runner up Mervyn King, 2009 BDO World Championship semi finalist Darryl Fitton and 2008 PDC World Championship runner up Kirk Shepherd. In his first Group C match, he was up against Darryl Fitton and comfortably won 5-1. In his next Group C match, he was up against Mervyn King and despite being the better player in terms of three dart average narrowly lost 5-4. In his last Group C match, he was up against Kirk Shepherd and lost 5-3 and was eliminated from the 2009 Grand Slam of Darts.
